= 1987 in race walking =

This page lists the World Best Year Performance in the year 1987 in both the men's and the women's race walking distances: 10 km, 20 km and 50 km (outdoor). One of the main events during this season were the 1987 World Athletics Championships in Rome, Italy.

== Abbreviations ==
- All times shown are in hours:minutes:seconds

WR	world record
AR	area record
CR	event record
NR	national record
PB	personal best

== Men's 20 km ==
=== Records ===
Standing records prior to the 1987 season in track and field
World Record	Jozef Pribilinec (TCH)	1:19:30	September 24, 1983	Bergen, Norway
Broken records during the 1987 season in track and field
World Record	Carlos Mercenario (MEX)	1:19:24	May 3, 1987	New York City, United States
World Record	Axel Noack (GDR)	1:19:12	June 21, 1987	Karl-Marx-Stadt, East Germany

=== 1987 World Year Ranking ===
Rank	Time	Athlete	Venue	Date	Note
1	1:19:12	Axel Noack (GDR)	Karl-Marx-Stadt, East Germany	21/06/1987	WR
2	1:19:22	Dave Smith (AUS)	Hobart, Australia		AR
3	1:19:24	Carlos Mercenario (MEX)	New York, United States	03/05/1987	AR
4	1:19:32	Viktor Mostovik (URS)	New York, United States	03/05/1987	NR
5	1:19:37	Ernesto Canto (MEX)			
6	1:20:04	Anatoliy Gorshkov (URS)	New York, United States	03/05/1987	
7	1:20:19	Querubín Moreno (COL)	New York, United States	03/05/1987	AR
8	1:20:40	Ronald Weigel (GDR)			
9	1:20:45	Maurizio Damilano (ITA)	Rome, Italy	30/08/1987	
10	1:20:45	Reima Salonen (FIN)			
11	1:20:51	Hartwig Gauder (GDR)			
12	1:21:00	Valdas Kazlauskas (URS)			
13	1:21:04	Frants Kostyukevich (URS)			
14	1:21:07	Jozef Pribilinec (TCH)	Rome, Italy	30/08/1987	
15	1:21:10	Pyotr Kachnovich (URS)			
16	1:21:24	Michail Potashov (URS)			
17	1:21:24	José Marín (ESP)	Rome, Italy	30/08/1987	
18	1:21:27	Roman Mrázek (TCH)			
19	1:21:28	Vyacheslav Ivanenko (URS)			
20	1:21:35	Pyotr Pochenchuk (URS)			

== Men's 50 km ==
=== Records ===
Standing records prior to the 1987 season in track and field
World Record	Ronald Weigel (GDR)	3:38:17	May 25, 1986	Potsdam, East Germany

=== 1987 World Year Ranking ===
Rank	Time	Athlete	Venue	Date	Note
1	3:40:07	Andrey Perlov (URS)			
2	3:40:53	Hartwig Gauder (GDR)	Rome, Italy	05/09/1987	
3	3:41:30	Ronald Weigel (GDR)	Rome, Italy	05/09/1987	
4	3:42:20	Pavol Szikora (TCH)			NR
5	3:43:14	Dietmar Meisch (GDR)	New York, United States	02/05/1987	
6	3:44:02	Vyacheslav Ivanenko (URS)	New York, United States	02/05/1987	
7	3:45:09	Valeriy Suntsov (URS)	New York, United States	02/05/1987	
8	3:46:28	Aleksandr Potashov (URS)	New York, United States	02/05/1987	
9	3:47:49	Raffaello Ducceschi (ITA)	Rome, Italy	05/09/1987	NR
10	3:48:27	Martín Bermúdez (MEX)	Rome, Italy	05/09/1987	
11	3:48:52	Sandro Bellucci (ITA)	Rome, Italy	05/09/1987	
12	3:50:19	Venyamin Nikolayev (URS)			
13	3:50:48	Manuel Alcalde (ESP)			
14	3:52:08	Arturo Bravo (MEX)	Rome, Italy	05/09/1987	
15	3:52:16	Andrés Marín (ESP)	Rome, Italy	05/09/1987	
16	3:52:21	Godfried De Jonckheere (BEL)	Rome, Italy	05/09/1987	NR
17	3:52:33	Giacomo Poggi (ITA)	New York, United States	02/05/1987	
18	3:52:38	François Lapointe (CAN)	New York, United States	02/05/1987	
19	3:52:51	Li Baojin (CHN)			AR
20	3:53:30	Raúl González (MEX)	Rome, Italy	05/09/1987	

== Women's 5 km ==
=== Records ===
Broken records during the 1987 season in track and field
World Record	Kerry Saxby (AUS)	20:34	September 24, 1987	Hildesheim, West Germany

=== 1987 World Year Ranking ===
Rank	Time	Athlete	Venue	Date	Note
1	20:34	Kerry Saxby (AUS)	Hildesheim, West Germany	24/09/1987	WR
2	21:25	Maria Reyes Sobrino (ESP)	La Coruña, Spain	16/05/1987	AR
3	21:36	Xu Yongjiu (CHN)			
3	21:36	Ann Jansson (SWE)			NR
5	21:37	Olga Krishtop (URS)			
5	21:37	Yan Hong (CHN)			
7	21:41	Yelena Nikolayeva (URS)			
8	21:43	Nina Stachrova (URS)			
9	21:46	Guan Ping (CHN)			
9	21:46	Olga Kardopolzeva (URS)			
11	21:51	Natalya Yermolenko (URS)			
12	21:53	Jin Bingjie (CHN)			
13	21:57	Susan Cook (AUS)			
14	22:01	Natalya Serbinenko (URS)			
15	22:02	Irina Tolstik (URS)			
16	22:06	Rimma Makarova (URS)			
17	22:12	Lidiya Levandovskaya (URS)			
17	22:12	Graciella Mendoza (ESP)			
19	22:14	Ann Peel (CAN)			
20	22:16	Dana Vavracová (TCH)			

== Women's 10 km ==
=== Records ===
Standing records prior to the 1987 season in track and field
World Record	Yan Hong (CHN)	44:14	March 16, 1985	Jian, PR China
Broken records during the 1987 season in track and field
World Record	Olga Krishtop (URS)	43:22	May 3, 1987	New York City, United States
World Record	Kerry Saxby (AUS)	42:52	May 4, 1987	Melbourne, Australia

=== 1987 World Year Ranking ===
Rank	Time	Athlete	Venue	Date	Note
1	42:52	Kerry Saxby (AUS)	Melbourne, Australia	04/05/1987	WR
2	43:22	Olga Krishtop (URS)	New York, United States	03/05/1987	AR
3	43:35	Irina Strakhova (URS)	New York, United States	03/05/1987	
4	43:45	Jin Bingjie (CHN)	New York, United States	03/05/1987	AR
5	43:57	Yelena Nikolayeva (URS)	New York, United States	03/05/1987	
6	44:33	Yelena Rodionova (URS)			
7	44:42	Yan Hong (CHN)	Rome, Italy	01/09/1987	
8	44:45	Lidiya Levandovskaya (URS)			
9	44:48	Mari Cruz Díaz (ESP)	Rome, Italy	01/09/1987	NR
10	44:51	Yelena Veremeychuk (URS)			
11	44:55	Natalya Spiridonova (URS)			
12	45:02	Graciela Mendoza (MEX)	New York, United States	03/05/1987	AR
13	45:04	Natalya Serbinenko (URS)	New York, United States	03/05/1987	
14	45:06	Ann Peel (CAN)	New York, United States	03/05/1987	AR
15	45:06	Tamara Kovalenko (URS)			
16	45:07	Vera Ossipova (URS)			
17	45:07	Natalya Yermolenko (URS)			
18	45:09	Dana Vavracová (TCH)			NR
19	45:09	Monica Gunnarsson (SWE)	Rome, Italy	01/09/1987	NR
20	45:15	Olimpiada Ivanova (URS)			

== See also ==
- 1987 IAAF World Race Walking Cup
