= 1987 IAAF World Race Walking Cup =

- Organisers: IAAF
- Edition: 13th
- Date: May 3
- Host city: New York City, New York, United States
- Events: 3
- Participation: 326 athletes from 36 nations

The 1987 IAAF World Race Walking Cup was held on 2 and 3 May 1987 in the streets of New York City, USA. The event was also known as IAAF Race Walking World Cup.

Complete results were published.

== Medallists ==
Event	Gold		Silver		Bronze	
Men
Men's 20 km walk	Carlos Mercenario; Mexico	1:19:24	Viktor Mostovik; Soviet Union	1:19:32	Anatoliy Gorshkov; Soviet Union	1:20:04
Men's 50 km walk	Ronald Weigel; East Germany	3:42:26	Hartwig Gauder; East Germany	3:42:52	Dietmar Meisch; East Germany	3:43:14
Lugano Cup (Men)
Team (Men)	Soviet Union	607 pts	Italy	569 pts	East Germany	518 pts
Women
Women's 10 km walk	Olga Krishtop; Soviet Union	43:22	Irina Strakhova; Soviet Union	43:35	Jin Bingjie; China	43:45
Eschborn Cup (Women)
Team (Women)	Soviet Union	203 pts	Spain	174 pts	Australia	167 pts

== Results ==
=== Men's 20 km ===
Place	Athlete	Nation	Time
1st place, gold medalist(s)	Carlos Mercenario	Mexico (MEX)	1:19:24
2nd place, silver medalist(s)	Viktor Mostóvik	Soviet Union (URS)	1:19:32
3rd place, bronze medalist(s)	Anatoliy Gorshkov	Soviet Union (URS)	1:20:04
4	Querubín Moreno	Colombia (COL)	1:20:19
5	Ernesto Canto	Mexico (MEX)	1:20:35
6	Axel Noack	East Germany (GDR)	1:21:53
7	Maurizio Damilano	Italy (ITA)	1:20:59
8	Viliulfo Andablo	Mexico (MEX)	1:21:44
9	Valdas Kazlauskas	Soviet Union (URS)	1:21:49
10	Héctor Moreno	Colombia (COL)	1:21:50
11	Simon Baker	Australia (AUS)	1:21:57
12	Erling Andersen	Norway (NOR)	1:22:15
13	Tim Lewis	United States (USA)	1:22:27
14	Roman Mrázek	Czechoslovakia (TCH)	1:22:34
15	Walter Arena	Italy (ITA)	1:22:49
16	Liu Jianli	China (CHN)	1:22:52
17	Francisco Vargas	Colombia (COL)	1:23:10
18	Carlo Mattioli	Italy (ITA)	1:23:26
19	Martial Fesselier	France (FRA)	1:23:46
20	Jiao Shaohong	China (CHN)	1:23:53
21	Pavol Blažek	Czechoslovakia (TCH)	1:23:58
22	Daniel Plaza	Spain (ESP)	1:24:01
23	Ian McCombie	Great Britain (GBR)	1:24:13
24	Giorgio Damilano	Italy (ITA)	1:24:17
25	Zdzisław Szlapkin	Poland (POL)	1:24:23
26	Stefan Johansson	Sweden (SWE)	1:24:48
27	Chris Maddocks	Great Britain (GBR)	1:24:53
28	Joel Sánchez	Mexico (MEX)	1:24:57
29	Jan Kłos	Poland (POL)	1:25:02
30	José Pinto	Portugal (POR)	1:25:05
31	Ricardo Pueyo	Spain (ESP)	1:25:27
32	Jan Staaf	Sweden (SWE)	1:25:30
33	Igor Kollár	Czechoslovakia (TCH)	1:25:33
34	Alessandro Pezzatini	Italy (ITA)	1:25:47
35	Miguel Angel Prieto	Spain (ESP)	1:25:52
36	Carlos Ramones	Venezuela (VEN)	1:25:55
37	Andrew Jachno	Australia (AUS)	1:25:58
38	José Urbano	Portugal (POR)	1:26:05
39	Zhou Zhaowen	China (CHN)	1:26:07
40	Abdel Wahab Ferguène	Algeria (ALG)	1:26:17
41	Jacek Bednarek	Poland (POL)	1:26:20
42	Wang Lizheng	China (CHN)	1:26:26
43	Carlos Montes	Spain (ESP)	1:26:27
44	Wolfgang Wiedemann	West Germany (FRG)	1:26:36
45	Ray Sharp	United States (USA)	1:27:01
46	Zbigniew Sadlej	Poland (POL)	1:27:04
47	John Patin	France (FRA)	1:27:23
48	Helder Oliveira	Portugal (POR)	1:27:25
49	Vesa Puukari	Finland (FIN)	1:27:28
50	Franz Kostyukevich	Soviet Union (URS)	1:27:33
51	Jacques Lemontagner	France (FRA)	1:27:51
52	János Szálas	Hungary (HUN)	1:27:53
53	Mike Stauch	United States (USA)	1:27:54
54	Mohamed Bouhalla	Algeria (ALG)	1:28:01
55	Endre Andrasfai	Hungary (HUN)	1:28:18
56	Paul Turpin	Canada (CAN)	1:28:19
57	Sándor Kanya	Hungary (HUN)	1:28:42
58	Roland Wieser	East Germany (GDR)	1:28:46
59	Paul Schwartzberg	United States (USA)	1:28:48
60	Ján Záhončík	Czechoslovakia (TCH)	1:28:56
61	Philip Vesty	Great Britain (GBR)	1:29:04
62	Philippe Lafleur	France (FRA)	1:29:34
63	Pauli Pirjetä	Finland (FIN)	1:29:38
64	Kari Ahonen	Finland (FIN)	1:29:41
65	Andi Drake	Great Britain (GBR)	1:29:45
66	Dirk Van De Bosch	Belgium (BEL)	1:29:49
67	Francisco Reis	Portugal (POR)	1:30:03
68	René Piller	France (FRA)	1:30:09
69	Torsten Hafemeister	East Germany (GDR)	1:30:11
70	Gilbert DʼAoust	Canada (CAN)	1:30:28
71	Franz-Josef Weber	West Germany (FRG)	1:30:44
72	Thomas Pomozi	Sweden (SWE)	1:31:01
73	Elier Garcés	Cuba (CUB)	1:31:20
74	Paul Copeland	Australia (AUS)	1:31:50
75	Michel Lafortune	Canada (CAN)	1:31:57
76	Edel Oliva	Cuba (CUB)	1:32:26
77	Markus Gerds	West Germany (FRG)	1:32:34
78	Jorge Velázquez	Cuba (CUB)	1:32:40
79	Yazid Lamali	Algeria (ALG)	1:33:11
80	Philippe Burton	Belgium (BEL)	1:33:13
81	Ulf-Peter Sjöholm	Sweden (SWE)	1:33:22
82	Siegmar Neuner	West Germany (FRG)	1:33:25
83	Rene Haarpainter	Switzerland (SUI)	1:33:41
84	Steve Pecinovsky	United States (USA)	1:33:45
85	Jimmy McDonald	Ireland (IRL)	1:33:46
86	Nelson Funes	Guatemala (GUA)	1:33:47
87	Marko Kivimäki	Finland (FIN)	1:34:08
88	Pascal Charrière	Switzerland (SUI)	1:34:10
89	Aldo Bertoldi	Switzerland (SUI)	1:34:44
90	Tor-Ivar Guttulsrød	Norway (NOR)	1:34:48
91	Benoît Gauthier	Canada (CAN)	1:35:04
92	Abderrahmane Djébbar	Algeria (ALG)	1:35:42
93	Javier Coto	Puerto Rico (PUR)	1:36:42
94	Daniel Levesque	Canada (CAN)	1:36:48
95	Jorge Torrealba	Venezuela (VEN)	1:36:55
96	Enrique Peña	Colombia (COL)	1:37:14
97	Michael Lane	Ireland (IRL)	1:37:14
98	José Ceballos	Venezuela (VEN)	1:37:42
99	Nicolás Soto	Puerto Rico (PUR)	1:38:11
100	Marc Musiaux	Belgium (BEL)	1:38:40
101	Sylvestre Marclay	Switzerland (SUI)	1:38:54
102	Lino Paez	Venezuela (VEN)	1:40:01
103	Vicente Bergesse	Argentina (ARG)	1:40:19
104	Paul Flynn	Ireland (IRL)	1:40:34
105	Jesús Flores	Cuba (CUB)	1:40:49
106	Philip Kipkemboi	Kenya (KEN)	1:41:04
107	Boniface Mutie	Kenya (KEN)	1:41:17
108	José Miranda	Puerto Rico (PUR)	1:41:22
109	Jorge Yannone	Argentina (ARG)	1:41:33
110	Pat Murphy	Ireland (IRL)	1:42:17
111	César Martínez	Venezuela (VEN)	1:42:30
112	Tony Morales	Dominican Republic (DOM)	1:44:06
113	Benjamín Loréfice	Argentina (ARG)	1:44:43
114	Jorge Loréfice	Argentina (ARG)	1:44:43
115	Megahed El-Sayed	Egypt (EGY)	1:46:17
116	Jagjit Singh	Malaysia (MAS)	1:50:46
117	Cherif Mohamed	Egypt (EGY)	1:52:14
118	Humberto Matheu	Ecuador (ECU)	1:56:23
119	Joaquin McDougall	Dominican Republic (DOM)	2:08:51
120	Antonio Oliva	Dominican Republic (DOM)	2:18:06
—	Dave Smith	Australia (AUS)	DQ
—	Andrej Rubarth	East Germany (GDR)	DQ
—	Sándor Urbanik	Hungary (HUN)	DQ
—	Héctor González	Dominican Republic (DOM)	DNF
—	Oscar Celleri	Ecuador (ECU)	DNF
—	Manuel Sánchez	Ecuador (ECU)	DNF
—	Medhat Hassan El-Zini	Egypt (EGY)	DNF
—	Miguel Carvajal	Spain (ESP)	DNF
—	Tomaz Alvaraz	Guatemala (GUA)	DNF
—	Carlos Díaz	Guatemala (GUA)	DNF
—	Patrick Mokomba	Kenya (KEN)	DNF
—	Maseran Nyad	Malaysia (MAS)	DNF
—	Dag Gaassand	Norway (NOR)	DNF
—	Iván Hernández	Puerto Rico (PUR)	DNF
—	Henry Mercado	Puerto Rico (PUR)	DNF
—	Magnus Morenius	Sweden (SWE)	DNF

=== Men's 50 km ===
Place	Athlete	Nation	Time
1st place, gold medalist(s)	Ronald Weigel	East Germany (GDR)	3:42:26
2nd place, silver medalist(s)	Hartwig Gauder	East Germany (GDR)	3:42:52
3rd place, bronze medalist(s)	Dietmar Meisch	East Germany (GDR)	3:43:14
4	Vyacheslav Ivanenko	Soviet Union (URS)	3:44:02
5	Valeriy Suntsov	Soviet Union (URS)	3:45:09
6	Andrey Perlov	Soviet Union (URS)	3:45:09
7	Aleksandr Potashov	Soviet Union (URS)	3:46:28
8	Martín Bermúdez	Mexico (MEX)	3:51:49
9	Alessandro Bellucci	Italy (ITA)	3:52:29
10	Raffaello Ducceschi	Italy (ITA)	3:52:29
11	Giacomo Poggi	Italy (ITA)	3:52:33
12	François Lapointe	Canada (CAN)	3:52:38
13	Gregorz Ledzion	Poland (POL)	3:54:28
14	Jorge Llopart	Spain (ESP)	3:55:35
15	Thierry Toutain	France (FRA)	3:55:58
16	Felix Goméz	Mexico (MEX)	3:56:31
17	Alain Lemercier	France (FRA)	3:56:54
18	Antonio González	Spain (ESP)	3:57:36
19	Andrés Marin	Spain (ESP)	3:58:06
20	Jean-Claude Corre	France (FRA)	3:58:26
21	Bernd Gummelt	East Germany (GDR)	3:59:04
22	Li Baoyin	China (CHN)	3:59:05
23	Manuel Alcalde	Spain (ESP)	3:59:50
24	Carl Schueler	United States (USA)	4:03:02
25	Pavel Szikora	Czechoslovakia (TCH)	4:03:30
26	Pierluigi Fiorella	Italy (ITA)	4:04:51
27	Paul Blagg	Great Britain (GBR)	4:06:22
28	Veijo Savikko	Finland (FIN)	4:06:30
29	Jim Heiring	United States (USA)	4:08:15
30	László Sátor	Hungary (HUN)	4:08:51
31	Martin Archambault	Canada (CAN)	4:08:56
32	Godfried De Jonckheere	Belgium (BEL)	4:09:14
33	Dan OʼConnor	United States (USA)	4:10:29
34	Éric Neisse	France (FRA)	4:10:37
35	Dennis Jackson	Great Britain (GBR)	4:11:05
36	Antero Lindman	Finland (FIN)	4:12:11
37	Mauricio Cortés	Colombia (COL)	4:12:54
38	Alfons Schwarz	West Germany (FRG)	4:13:02
39	Luboš Mackanic	Czechoslovakia (TCH)	4:13:17
40	Edel Oliva	Cuba (CUB)	4:14:19
41	Zhang Fuxin	China (CHN)	4:14:32
42	Les Morton	Great Britain (GBR)	4:14:48
43	Zoltán Czukor	Hungary (HUN)	4:15:17
44	Matti Katila	Finland (FIN)	4:15:42
45	Fritz Helms	West Germany (FRG)	4:16:07
46	Clodomiro Moreno	Colombia (COL)	4:17:02
47	Matti Heikkilä	Finland (FIN)	4:17:04
48	Josef Hudak	Czechoslovakia (TCH)	4:17:28
49	Rudolf Veréb	Hungary (HUN)	4:18:44
50	Detlef Heitmann	West Germany (FRG)	4:18:46
51	Roland Nilsson	Sweden (SWE)	4:19:12
52	Craig Brill	Australia (AUS)	4:19:46
53	Steve Hausfield	Australia (AUS)	4:22:27
54	Pavol Jati	Czechoslovakia (TCH)	4:23:28
55	Eric Ledune	Belgium (BEL)	4:25:01
56	Jesús Flores	Cuba (CUB)	4:25:01
57	Christer Forsström	Sweden (SWE)	4:25:31
58	Barry Graham	Great Britain (GBR)	4:25:37
59	Samuel Ginés	Spain (ESP)	4:26:07
60	Miklós Domján	Hungary (HUN)	4:26:23
61	Jorge Velázquez	Cuba (CUB)	4:26:47
62	Robert Mildenberger	West Germany (FRG)	4:27:17
63	Michael Harvey	Australia (AUS)	4:28:00
64	Mark Donahoo	Australia (AUS)	4:29:49
65	Hammimed Rahouli	Algeria (ALG)	4:30:14
66	Wolfgang Varrin	Switzerland (SUI)	4:30:19
67	Carlos Albano	Portugal (POR)	4:30:35
68	Glen Sweazey	Canada (CAN)	4:31:02
69	Zhao Jianping	China (CHN)	4:32:23
70	Nelson Funes	Guatemala (GUA)	4:34:03
71	José Gonçalves	Portugal (POR)	4:35:50
72	Elier Garcés	Cuba (CUB)	4:36:15
73	Niclas Nordenström	Sweden (SWE)	4:37:13
74	Ernesto Alfaro	Colombia (COL)	4:37:28
75	Christian Halloy	Belgium (BEL)	4:37:51
76	Nourreddine Haddadou	Algeria (ALG)	4:38:20
77	Juan Yañez	Venezuela (VEN)	4:39:25
78	Daniel Brot	Switzerland (SUI)	4:41:31
79	Arezki Boumar	Algeria (ALG)	4:44:32
80	Luis Iriza	Venezuela (VEN)	4:45:15
81	Renzo Toscanelli	Switzerland (SUI)	4:46:03
82	Bernard Binggeli	Switzerland (SUI)	4:46:46
83	Omar Castillo	Venezuela (VEN)	4:52:08
84	Tomaz Alvaraz	Guatemala (GUA)	4:59:53
85	Juan Limpio	Venezuela (VEN)	5:04:45
86	Luis Alem	Argentina (ARG)	5:32:05
—	Sun Xiaoguang	China (CHN)	DQ
—	Enrique Peña	Colombia (COL)	DQ
—	Zbigniew Wiśniowski	Poland (POL)	DQ
—	José Pinto	Portugal (POR)	DQ
—	Vicente Bergesse	Argentina (ARG)	DNF
—	Alberto Hidalgo	Argentina (ARG)	DNF
—	Jorge Yannone	Argentina (ARG)	DNF
—	Donald Debel	Belgium (BEL)	DNF
—	Héctor González	Dominican Republic (DOM)	DNF
—	Joaquin McDougall	Dominican Republic (DOM)	DNF
—	Tony Morales	Dominican Republic (DOM)	DNF
—	Oscar Celleri	Ecuador (ECU)	DNF
—	Humberto Matheu	Ecuador (ECU)	DNF
—	Manuel Sánchez	Ecuador (ECU)	DNF
—	Megahed El-Sayed	Egypt (EGY)	DNF
—	Medhat Hassan El-Zini	Egypt (EGY)	DNF
—	Cherif Mohamed	Egypt (EGY)	DNF
—	Dominique Guebey	France (FRA)	DNF
—	Carlos Díaz	Guatemala (GUA)	DNF
—	Paul Flynn	Ireland (IRL)	DNF
—	Michael Lane	Ireland (IRL)	DNF
—	Jimmy McDonald	Ireland (IRL)	DNF
—	Pat Murphy	Ireland (IRL)	DNF
—	Philip Kipkemboi	Kenya (KEN)	DNF
—	Patrick Mokomba	Kenya (KEN)	DNF
—	Boniface Mutie	Kenya (KEN)	DNF
—	Maseran Nyad	Malaysia (MAS)	DNF
—	Jagjit Singh	Malaysia (MAS)	DNF
—	Hernán Andrade	Mexico (MEX)	DNF
—	Arturo Bravo	Mexico (MEX)	DNF
—	Erling Andersen	Norway (NOR)	DNF
—	Jan-Erik Andreassen	Norway (NOR)	DNF
—	Dag Gaassand	Norway (NOR)	DNF
—	Bohdan Bułakowski	Poland (POL)	DNF
—	Jerzy Wróblewicz	Poland (POL)	DNF
—	Jorge Esteves	Portugal (POR)	DNF
—	Javier Coto	Puerto Rico (PUR)	DNF
—	Ivan Hernández	Puerto Rico (PUR)	DNF
—	Henry Mercado	Puerto Rico (PUR)	DNF
—	José Miranda	Puerto Rico (PUR)	DNF
—	Nicolás Soto	Puerto Rico (PUR)	DNF
—	Bo Gustafsson	Sweden (SWE)	DNF
—	Lennart Mether	Sweden (SWE)	DNF
—	Marco Evoniuk	United States (USA)	DNF
—	Randy Mimm	United States (USA)	DNF
—	Rafael Marin	Venezuela (VEN)	DNF
—	Jamal Ali Al-Hakim	North Yemen (YAR)	DNF
—	Faisal Al-Kasimi	North Yemen (YAR)	DNF
—	Mohamed Al-Saidi	North Yemen (YAR)	DNF

=== Team (men) ===
The team rankings, named Lugano Trophy, combined the 20 km and 50 km events team results.

Place	Country	Points
1st place, gold medalist(s)	Soviet Union	607 pts
2nd place, silver medalist(s)	Italy	569 pts
3rd place, bronze medalist(s)	East Germany	518 pts
4	Spain	505 pts
5	Mexico	495 pts
6	France	483 pts
7	Czechoslovakia	472 pts
8	Colombia	472 pts
9	United States	462 pts
10	China	451 pts
11	United Kingdom	445 pts
12	Finland	392 pts
13	Hungary	386 pts
14	Australia	385 pts
15	Canada	374 pts
16	Sweden	367 pts
17	West Germany	358 pts
18	Poland	323 pts
19	Cuba	313 pts
20	Portugal	311 pts
21	Algeria	304 pts
22	Belgium	297 pts
23	Venezuela	251 pts
24	Switzerland	238 pts
25	Norway	127 pts
26	Guatemala	120 pts
27	Argentina	101 pts
28	Ireland	92 pts
29	Puerto Rico	82 pts
30	Kenya	47 pts
31	Dominican Republic	47 pts
32	Egypt	34 pts
33	Malaysia	17 pts
34	Ecuador	15 pts
35	North Yemen	DNF

=== Women's 10 km ===
Place	Athlete	Nation	Time
1st place, gold medalist(s)	Olga Krishtop	Soviet Union (URS)	43:22
2nd place, silver medalist(s)	Irina Strakhova	Soviet Union (URS)	43:35
3rd place, bronze medalist(s)	Jin Bingjie	China (CHN)	43:45
4	Kerry Saxby-Junna	Australia (AUS)	43:45
5	Yelena Nikolayeva	Soviet Union (URS)	43:57
6	Graciela Mendoza	Mexico (MEX)	45:02
7	Ann Peel	Canada (CAN)	45:06
8	Natalya Serbiyenko	Soviet Union (URS)	45:05
9	Ann Jansson	Sweden (SWE)	45:24
10	Mari Cruz Díaz	Spain (ESP)	45:39
11	Lisa Langford	Great Britain (GBR)	45:42
12	Li Sujie	China (CHN)	45:51
13	Sue Orr	Australia (AUS)	46:03
14	Teresa Palacio	Spain (ESP)	46:13
15	María Reyes Sobrino	Spain (ESP)	46:22
16	Maryanne Torellas	United States (USA)	46:28
17	Kjersti Plätzer	Norway (NOR)	46:28
18	Monica Gunnarsson	Sweden (SWE)	46:38
19	Emilia Cano	Spain (ESP)	46:50
20	Teresa Vaill	United States (USA)	46:50
21	Maria Colin	Mexico (MEX)	47:03
22	Janice McCaffrey	Canada (CAN)	47:11
23	Maricela Chávez	Mexico (MEX)	47:15
24	Sirkka Oikarinen	Finland (FIN)	47:20
25	Deborah Powell	Canada (CAN)	47:36
26	Maria Hidalgo	Mexico (MEX)	47:30
27	Lisa Vaill	United States (USA)	47:32
28	Lora Rigutto	Canada (CAN)	48:01
29	Mária Urbanik	Hungary (HUN)	48:05
30	Suzanne Griesbach	France (FRA)	48:11
31	Debbi Lawrence	United States (USA)	48:16
32	Lorraine Young-Jachno	Australia (AUS)	48:21
33	Alison Baker	Canada (CAN)	48:31
34	Lynn Weik	United States (USA)	48:37
35	Barbara Kollorz	West Germany (FRG)	48:37
36	Mirva Hämäläinen	Finland (FIN)	48:38
37	Beverley Allen	Great Britain (GBR)	48:45
38	Ildikó Ilyés	Hungary (HUN)	48:51
39	Rudolfne Hudi	Hungary (HUN)	48:52
40	Helena Åström	Finland (FIN)	48:55
41	Solvi Furnes	Norway (NOR)	49:05
42	Helen Elleker	Great Britain (GBR)	49:11
43	Nina Arnesen	Norway (NOR)	49:14
44	Antonella Marangoni	Italy (ITA)	49:32
45	Ileana Salvador	Italy (ITA)	49:35
46	Margareta Olsson	Sweden (SWE)	49:44
47	Anikó Szebenszky	Hungary (HUN)	49:45
48	Sabine Desmet	Belgium (BEL)	49:55
49	Rosa Sierra	Spain (ESP)	49:44
50	Jeanine Gosselin	France (FRA)	50:18
51	Gunhild Kristiansen	Denmark (DEN)	50:20
52	Renate Warz	West Germany (FRG)	50:20
53	Anita Blomberg	Norway (NOR)	50:40
54	Elsa Abril	Colombia (COL)	50:40
55	Cathrin Rudolph	West Germany (FRG)	50:58
56	Brigitte Buck	West Germany (FRG)	50:59
57	Jeanine Vignat	France (FRA)	51:11
58	Emma Uhlin	Sweden (SWE)	51:14
59	Mylène Dumesnil	France (FRA)	51:34
60	Karin Jensen	Denmark (DEN)	51:59
61	Anne-Catherine Berthonnaud	France (FRA)	52:05
62	Margot Vetterli	Switzerland (SUI)	52:10
63	Rosanna Feroldi	Italy (ITA)	52:14
64	Kristin Andreassen	Norway (NOR)	52:22
65	Christel Schenk	Belgium (BEL)	52:25
66	Heidi Rebellato	Switzerland (SUI)	52:27
67	Nadia Forestan	Italy (ITA)	52:44
68	Magdalena Pettersson	Sweden (SWE)	52:46
69	Carla Peuntes	Colombia (COL)	52:59
70	Morelba Useche	Venezuela (VEN)	53:00
71	Edith Sappl	Switzerland (SUI)	53:11
72	Sabine Deblanck	Belgium (BEL)	53:30
73	Christa Ceulemans	Belgium (BEL)	54:19
75	Josephine Quinlan	Ireland (IRL)	55:41
76	Marie Walsh	Ireland (IRL)	56:29
77	Ofelia Puyol	Argentina (ARG)	57:14
78	Francis Botello	Venezuela (VEN)	57:21
79	Maritza Aragon	Venezuela (VEN)	59:56
80	Susana Córdoba	Argentina (ARG)	60:25
81	Amani Mohamed	Egypt (EGY)	61:09
82	Monica Costa	Argentina (ARG)	61:14
83	Zeinab Idriss	Egypt (EGY)	64:09
84	Karima Farag Said	Egypt (EGY)	65:31
85	Amparo Zanorano	Colombia (COL)	1:13:16
—	Guan Ping	China (CHN)	DQ
—	Xu Yongjiu	China (CHN)	DQ
—	Yan Hong	China (CHN)	DQ
—	Nicky Jackson	Great Britain (GBR)	DQ
—	Giuliana Salce	Italy (ITA)	DNF

=== Team (women) ===
Place	Country	Points
1st place, gold medalist(s)	Soviet Union	203 pts
2nd place, silver medalist(s)	Spain	174 pts
3rd place, bronze medalist(s)	Australia	167 pts
4	Mexico	164 pts
5	Canada	160 pts
6	United States	153 pts
7	Sweden	146 pts
8	United Kingdom	135 pts
9	China	126 pts
10	Finland	126 pts
11	Norway	124 pts
12	Hungary	122 pts
13	France	97 pts
14	West Germany	94 pts
15	Italy	86 pts
16	Belgium	65 pts
17	Switzerland	57 pts
18	Denmark	51 pts
19	Colombia	47 pts
20	Ireland	39 pts
21	Venezuela	36 pts
22	Argentina	25 pts
23	Egypt	16 pts

== Participation ==
The participation of 326 athletes (236 men/90 women) from 36 countries is reported.

- Algeria (7/-)
- Argentina (6/3)
- Australia (8/3)
- Belgium (7/4)
- Canada (8/5)
- China (8/5)
- Colombia (7/3)
- Cuba (4/-)
- Czechoslovakia (8/-)
- Denmark (-/2)
- Dominican Republic (4/-)
- East Germany (8/-)
- Ecuador (3/-)
- Egypt (3/3)
- Finland (8/3)
- France (10/5)
- Guatemala (3/-)
- Hungary (8/4)
- Ireland (4/2)
- Italy (9/5)
- Kenya (3/-)
- Malaysia (2/-)
- Mexico (8/4)
- North Yemen (3/-)
- Norway (4/5)
- Poland (8/-)
- Portugal (7/-)
- Puerto Rico (5/-)
- Soviet Union (8/4)
- Spain (10/5)
- Sweden (10/5)
- Switzerland (8/3)
- United Kingdom (8/4)
- United States (10/5)
- Venezuela (10/3)
- West Germany (8/4)

== See also ==
- 1987 Race Walking Year Ranking
