= 1983 IAAF World Race Walking Cup =

- Organisers: IAAF
- Edition: 11th
- Date: September 24–25
- Host city: Bergen, Vestlandet, Norway
- Events: 3
- Participation: 169 athletes from 18 nations

The 1983 IAAF World Race Walking Cup was held on 24 and 25 September 1983 in the streets of Bergen, Norway. The event was also known as IAAF Race Walking World Cup.

Complete results were published.

== Medallists ==
Event	Gold		Silver		Bronze	
Men
Men's 20 km walk	Jozef Pribilinec; Czechoslovakia	1:19:30	Ernesto Canto; Mexico	1:19:41	Anatoliy Solomin; Soviet Union	1:19:43
Men's 50 km walk	Raúl González; Mexico	3:45:37	Sergey Yung; Soviet Union	3:48:46	Viktor Dorovskikh; Soviet Union	3:49:47
Lugano Cup (Men)
Team (Men)	Soviet Union	231 pts	Italy	189 pts	Mexico	146 pts
Women
Women's 10 km walk	Xu Yongjiu; China	45:14	Natalya Sharipova; Soviet Union	45:26	Susan Cook; Australia	45:27
Eschborn Cup (Women)
Team (Women)	China	132 pts	Soviet Union	130 pts	Australia	124 pts

== Results ==
=== Men's 20 km ===
Place	Athlete	Nation	Time
1st place, gold medalist(s)	Jozef Pribilinec	Czechoslovakia (TCH)	1:19:30
2nd place, silver medalist(s)	Ernesto Canto	Mexico (MEX)	1:19:41
3rd place, bronze medalist(s)	Anatoliy Solomin	Soviet Union (URS)	1:19:43
4	Maurizio Damilano	Italy (ITA)	1:20:10
5	Yevgeniy Yevsyukov	Soviet Union (URS)	1:20:30
6	Marcelino Colín	Mexico (MEX)	1:20:40
7	Carlo Mattioli	Italy (ITA)	1:21:11
8	Anatoliy Gorshkov	Soviet Union (URS)	1:21:26
9	Pavol Blažek	Czechoslovakia (TCH)	1:21:37
10	Sergey Protschin	Soviet Union (URS)	1:22:03
11	Guillaume LeBlanc	Canada (CAN)	1:24:17
12	Giorgio Damilano	Italy (ITA)	1:24:27
13	Stanisław Rola	Poland (POL)	1:24:39
14	Simon Baker	Australia (AUS)	1:24:43
15	Erling Andersen	Norway (NOR)	1:24:50
16	Jim Heiring	United States (USA)	1:24:51
17	Zhang Fuxin	China (CHN)	1:25:23
18	Andrew Jachno	Australia (AUS)	1:25:51
19	Martial Fesselier	France (FRA)	1:26:01
20	Roman Mrázek	Czechoslovakia (TCH)	1:26:16
21	Philip Vesty	Great Britain (GBR)	1:26:20
22	Alessandro Pezzatini	Italy (ITA)	1:26:22
23	Jiang Shaohong	China (CHN)	1:27:22
24	Todd Scully	United States (USA)	1:27:29
25	Zhang Yanlong	China (CHN)	1:27:35
26	Francisco Botonero	Spain (ESP)	1:27:48
27	Robert Mildenberger	West Germany (FRG)	1:27:50
28	Guang Xinli	China (CHN)	1:28:09
29	Ivo Pták	Czechoslovakia (TCH)	1:28:12
30	Michael Woods	Australia (AUS)	1:28:18
31	José Marín	Spain (ESP)	1:28:24
32	Ian McCombie	Great Britain (GBR)	1:28:28
33	Roger Mills	Great Britain (GBR)	1:28:33
34	Tim Lewis	United States (USA)	1:28:57
35	Wolfgang Wiedemann	West Germany (FRG)	1:29:23
36	Jaroslaw Kazmierski	Poland (POL)	1:29:33
37	Zdzisław Szlapkin	Poland (POL)	1:29:56
38	Félix Gómez	Mexico (MEX)	1:30:11
39	Sam Schick	United States (USA)	1:30:26
40	Allan King	Great Britain (GBR)	1:30:30
41	Andrés Marin	Spain (ESP)	1:30:45
42	Helmut Boeck	Canada (CAN)	1:31:45
43	Jean-Marie Neff	France (FRA)	1:31:48
44	Zbigniew Wiśniowski	Poland (POL)	1:32:00
45	Dominique Guebey	France (FRA)	1:33:05
46	Alfons Schwarz	West Germany (FRG)	1:33:19
47	Jan Rolstad	Norway (NOR)	1:35:25
48	Tor-Ivar Guttulsrød	Norway (NOR)	1:35:32
49	Daniel Levesque	Canada (CAN)	1:36:17
50	Luis Maroto	Spain (ESP)	1:38:59
—	Dave Smith	Australia (AUS)	DQ
—	Franz-Josef Weber	West Germany (FRG)	DQ
—	Enrique Vera	Mexico (MEX)	DQ
—	Lars Ove Moen	Norway (NOR)	DQ

=== Men's 50 km ===
Place	Athlete	Nation	Time
1st place, gold medalist(s)	Raúl González	Mexico (MEX)	3:45:37
2nd place, silver medalist(s)	Sergey Yung	Soviet Union (URS)	3:48:46
3rd place, bronze medalist(s)	Viktor Dorovskikh	Soviet Union (URS)	3:49:47
4	Jorge Llopart	Spain (ESP)	3:52:57
5	Gérard Lelièvre	France (FRA)	3:54:55
6	Sergey Zimbaljuk	Soviet Union (URS)	3:56:56
7	Paolo Grecucci	Italy (ITA)	3:57:14
8	Ivan Tichonov	Soviet Union (URS)	3:58:14
9	Chris Maddocks	Great Britain (GBR)	4:02:28
10	Manuel Alcalde	Spain (ESP)	4:04:50
11	Jan Klos	Poland (POL)	4:05:25
12	Jean-Claude Corré	France (FRA)	4:05:32
13	Lars Ove Moen	Norway (NOR)	4:06:02
14	Karl Degener	West Germany (FRG)	4:06:46
15	Paolo Ghedina	Italy (ITA)	4:07:14
16	Dennis Jackson	Great Britain (GBR)	4:07:58
17	Jürgen Meyer	West Germany (FRG)	4:09:12
18	Daniel O'Connor	United States (USA)	4:09:50
19	Denis Terraz	France (FRA)	4:09:57
20	Heinrich Schubert	West Germany (FRG)	4:11:20
21	Adam Urbanowski	Poland (POL)	4:11:37
22	Barry Graham	Great Britain (GBR)	4:12:18
23	Tom Edwards	United States (USA)	4:13:30
24	Samuel Ginés	Spain (ESP)	4:14:59
25	Tim Erickson	Australia (AUS)	4:15:13
26	Grzegorz Ledzion	Poland (POL)	4:16:37
27	Giacomo Poggi	Italy (ITA)	4:16:46
28	Arturo Bravo	Mexico (MEX)	4:18:03
29	Dai Mingxi	China (CHN)	4:18:17
30	Paul Blagg	Great Britain (GBR)	4:19:17
31	Štefan Rebo	Czechoslovakia (TCH)	4:23:27
32	Luboš Mackanic	Czechoslovakia (TCH)	4:25:53
33	Qian Ku	China (CHN)	4:26:05
34	Jean-Pierre Saint-Martin	France (FRA)	4:26:20
35	Stanisław Korneluk	Poland (POL)	4:29:55
36	Wayne Glusker	United States (USA)	4:31:41
37	Miroslav Svoboda	Czechoslovakia (TCH)	4:32:37
38	Ragner Hofnes	Norway (NOR)	4:33:40
39	Duncan Knox	Australia (AUS)	4:35:13
—	Bill Dyer	Australia (AUS)	DQ
—	Martin Archambault	Canada (CAN)	DQ
—	Qiu Shiyong	China (CHN)	DQ
—	Wang Chuntang	China (CHN)	DQ
—	Walter Schwoche	West Germany (FRG)	DQ
—	Sandro Bellucci	Italy (ITA)	DQ
—	Pedro Aroche	Mexico (MEX)	DQ
—	Martín Bermúdez	Mexico (MEX)	DQ
—	Marco Evoniuk	United States (USA)	DQ
—	Michael Harvey	Australia (AUS)	DNF
—	François Lapointe	Canada (CAN)	DNF
—	Erling Andersen	Norway (NOR)	DNF
—	Kåre Sandvik	Norway (NOR)	DNF
—	Pavel Szikora	Czechoslovakia (TCH)	DNF

=== Team (men) ===
The team rankings, named Lugano Trophy, combined the 20 km and 50 km events team results.

Place	Country	Points
1st place, gold medalist(s)	Soviet Union	231 pts
2nd place, silver medalist(s)	Italy	189 pts
3rd place, bronze medalist(s)	Mexico	146 pts
4	Czechoslovakia	138 pts
5	United Kingdom	137 pts
6	Spain	135 pts
7	France	131 pts
8	Poland	126 pts
9	United States	120 pts
10	West Germany	116 pts
11	Australia	100 pts
12	China	96 pts
13	Norway	74 pts
14	Canada	41 pts
—	East Germany	DNS

=== Women's 10 km ===
Place	Athlete	Nation	Time
1st place, gold medalist(s)	Xu Yongjiu	China (CHN)	45:14
2nd place, silver medalist(s)	Natalya Sharipova	Soviet Union (URS)	45:26
3rd place, bronze medalist(s)	Susan Cook	Australia (AUS)	45:27
4	Sally Pierson	Australia (AUS)	45:40
5	Siv Gustavsson	Sweden (SWE)	46:21
6	Guan Ping	China (CHN)	46:29
7	Lyudmila Khrustyeva	Soviet Union (URS)	46:39
8	Vera Osipova	Soviet Union (URS)	46:49
9	Yu Heping	China (CHN)	46:59
10	Ann Peel	Canada (CAN)	47:02
11	Eva Karlsson	Sweden (SWE)	47:10
12	Rosa Underova	Soviet Union (URS)	47:16
13	Frøydis Hilsen	Norway (NOR)	47:37
14	Ann Jansson	Sweden (SWE)	47:42
15	Rachel Thompson	Australia (AUS)	47:51
16	Maryanne Torellas	United States (USA)	47:53
17	Suzanne Griesbach	France (FRA)	47:57
18	Giuliana Salce	Italy (ITA)	48:58
19	Irene Bateman	Great Britain (GBR)	49:00
20	Ann Ryan	Australia (AUS)	49:05
21	Sam Miller	United States (USA)	49:20
22	Maria Grazia Cogoli	Italy (ITA)	49:25
23	Mia Kjølberg	Norway (NOR)	49:32
24	Antonella Marangoni	Italy (ITA)	49:43
25	Jill Barrett	Great Britain (GBR)	49:47
26	Ginney Lovell-Birch	Great Britain (GBR)	49:52
27	Teresa Palacios	Spain (ESP)	50:02
28	Gunhild Kristiansen	Denmark (DEN)	50:18
29	Mari Cruz Díaz	Spain (ESP)	50:19
30	Line Viken	Norway (NOR)	50:24
31	Jeanine Gosselin	France (FRA)	50:24
32	Monica Gunnarsson	Sweden (SWE)	50:32
33	Torunn Syvertsen	Norway (NOR)	50:42
34	Monique Boueroux	France (FRA)	51:09
35	Kazimiera Mróz-Mosio	Poland (POL)	51:10
36	Vivianne Humbert	France (FRA)	51:15
37	Ingrid Adam	West Germany (FRG)	51:45
38	Margot Vetterli	Switzerland (SUI)	51:47
39	Micheline Daneau	Canada (CAN)	51:52
40	Beata Bączyk	Poland (POL)	51:52
41	Susan Liers-Westerfield	United States (USA)	51:54
42	Brenda Lupton	Great Britain (GBR)	51:54
43	Kataryzna Figurowska	Poland (POL)	52:05
44	Yolanda Fernández	Spain (ESP)	52:06
45	Karin Jensen	Denmark (DEN)	52:18
46	Pier Carola Pagani	Italy (ITA)	52:20
47	Lucyna Rokitowska	Poland (POL)	52:36
48	Helena Åström	Finland (FIN)	52:41
49	Brigitte Buck	West Germany (FRG)	52:48
50	Renate Bauch	West Germany (FRG)	53:25
51	Debbi Lawrence	United States (USA)	53:49
52	Sari Essayah	Finland (FIN)	53:54
53	Nancy Sweazey	Canada (CAN)	53:56
54	Edith Sappl	Switzerland (SUI)	54:27
55	Lene Cassidy	Denmark (DEN)	54:32
56	Ulla Kristiansen	Denmark (DEN)	54:40
57	Begoña Miranda	Spain (ESP)	54:56
58	Monica Robertson	Finland (FIN)	55:44
59	Sirpa Kniivilä	Finland (FIN)	56:09
60	Corinne Aviolat	Switzerland (SUI)	58:04
61	Jutta Schwoche	West Germany (FRG)	58:32
62	Suzi Darballey	Switzerland (SUI)	61:51
—	Joni Bender	Canada (CAN)	DQ
—	Yan Hong	China (CHN)	DQ

=== Team (women) ===
Place	Country	Points
1st place, gold medalist(s)	China	132 pts
2nd place, silver medalist(s)	Soviet Union	130 pts
3rd place, bronze medalist(s)	Australia	126 pts
4	Sweden	118 pts
5	Italy	88 pts
6	Norway	86 pts
7	United Kingdom	82 pts
8	United States	77 pts
9	France	72 pts
10	Canada	59 pts
11	Spain	57 pts
12	Poland	44 pts
13	Denmark	36 pts
14	West Germany	32 pts
15	Switzerland	21 pts
16	Finland	17 pts

== Participation ==
The participation of 169 athletes (105 men/64 women) from 18 countries is reported.

- Australia (8/4)
- Canada (5/4)
- China (8/4)
- Czechoslovakia (8/-)
- Denmark (-/4)
- Finland (-/4)
- France (7/4)
- Italy (8/4)
- Mexico (8/-)
- Norway (6/4)
- Poland (8/4)
- Soviet Union (8/4)
- Spain (7/4)
- Sweden (-/4)
- Switzerland (-/4)
- United Kingdom (8/4)
- United States (8/4)
- West Germany (8/4)

== Qualifying rounds ==
From 1961 to 1985 there were qualifying rounds for the men's competition with the first two winners proceeding to the final. This year, the German Democratic Republic, Italy, the Soviet Union, México, Norway, the United States, Australia, China, and Canada proceeded directly to the final.

Countries qualifying for the final are highlighted in green

=== Zone 1 ===
London, United Kingdom, June 11

Rank	Nation	Points
1	United Kingdom	41 pts
2	Spain	39 pts
3	Finland	38 pts
4	Sweden	37 pts

=== Zone 2 ===
Bar-le-Duc, France, June 18/19

Rank	Nation	Points
1	France	78 pts
2	West Germany	69 pts
3	Belgium	27 pts
4	Switzerland	15 pts
5	Luxembourg	8 pts

=== Zone 3 ===
Trnava, Czechoslovakia, June 18

Rank	Nation	Points
1	Czechoslovakia	55 pts
2	Poland	48 pts
3	Hungary	43 pts
4	Austria	6 pts
