= 1982 European Athletics Championships – Men's 50 kilometres walk =

Men's 50 kilometres walk at the European Athletics Championships

These are the official results of the Men's 50 km walk event at the 1982 European Championships in Athens, Greece, held on 10 September 1982.

== Medalists ==
Gold	Reima Salonen; Finland
Silver	José Marín; Spain
Bronze	Bo Gustafsson; Sweden

== Abbreviations ==
- All times shown are in hours:minutes:seconds

DNS	did not start
NM	no mark
WR	world record
WL	world leading
AR	area record
NR	national record
PB	personal best
SB	season best

== Results ==
=== Final ===
10 September

Rank	Name	Nationality	Time	Notes
1st place, gold medalist(s)	Reima Salonen	Finland	3:55:29	
2nd place, silver medalist(s)	José Marín	Spain	3:59:18	
3rd place, bronze medalist(s)	Bo Gustafsson	Sweden	4:01:21	
4	Hartwig Gauder	East Germany	4:04:51	
5	Bogusław Duda	Poland	4:07:20	
6	Jorge Llopart	Spain	4:08:28	
7	Valeriy Suntsov	Soviet Union	4:12:51	
8	Stig-Olaf Elofsson	Sweden	4:22:44	
9	Christos Karagiorgos	Greece	4:33:31	
10	Sergey Yung	Soviet Union	4:35:02	
11	Karl Degener	West Germany	4:35:54	
	Pavol Blažek	Czechoslovakia	DNF	
	Paolo Grecucci	Italy	DNF	
	Erling Andersen	Norway	DNF	
	Bohdan Bułakowski	Poland	DNF	
	Dietmar Meisch	East Germany	DNF	
	Aristidis Karagiorgos	Greece	DNF	
	Lars Ove Moen	Norway	DNF	
	Maurizio Damilano	Italy	DNF	
	Leif Christensen	Denmark	DNF	
	Viktor Dorovskikh	Soviet Union	DNF	
	Manuel Alcalde	Spain	DNF	
	Sandro Bellucci	Italy	DQ	
	Bengt Simonsen	Sweden	DQ	

== Participation ==
According to an unofficial count, 24 athletes from 12 countries participated in the event.

- Czechoslovakia (1)
- Denmark (1)
- East Germany (2)
- Finland (1)
- Greece (2)
- Italy (3)
- Norway (2)
- Poland (2)
- Soviet Union (3)
- Spain (3)
- Sweden (3)
- West Germany (1)

== See also ==
- 1978 Men's European Championships 50km Walk (Prague)
- 1980 Men's Olympic 50km Walk (Moscow)
- 1983 Men's World Championships 50km Walk (Helsinki)
- 1984 Men's Olympic 50km Walk (Los Angeles)
- 1986 Men's European Championships 50km Walk (Stuttgart)
- 1987 Men's World Championships 50km Walk (Rome)
- 1988 Men's Olympic 50km Walk (Seoul)
