= 1985 IAAF World Race Walking Cup =

- Organisers: IAAF
- Edition: 12th
- Date: September 28–29
- Host city: St. John's, Isle of Man
- Events: 3
- Participation: 158 athletes from 18 nations

The 1985 IAAF World Race Walking Cup was held on 28 and 29 September 1985 in the streets of St John's, Isle of Man. The event was also known as IAAF Race Walking World Cup.

Complete results were published.

== Medallists ==
Event	Gold		Silver		Bronze	
Men
Men's 20 km walk	José Marín; Spain	1:21:42	Maurizio Damilano; Italy	1:21:43	Viktor Mostovik; Soviet Union	1:22:01
Men's 50 km walk	Hartwig Gauder; East Germany	3:47:31	Andrey Perlov; Soviet Union	3:49:23	Axel Noack; East Germany	3:56:53
Lugano Cup (Men)
Team (Men)	East Germany	234 pts	Soviet Union	234 pts	Italy	233 pts
Women
Women's 10 km walk	Yan Hong; China	46:22	Guan Ping; China	46:23	Olga Krishtop; Soviet Union; Aleksandra Grigoryeva; Soviet Union	46:24
Eschborn Cup (Women)
Team (Women)	China	104 pts	Soviet Union	98 pts	Canada	74 pts

== Results ==
=== Men's 20 km ===
Place	Athlete	Nation	Time
1st place, gold medalist(s)	José Marín	Spain (ESP)	1:21:42
2nd place, silver medalist(s)	Maurizio Damilano	Italy (ITA)	1:21:43
3rd place, bronze medalist(s)	Viktor Mostovik	Soviet Union (URS)	1:22:01
4	Roland Wieser	East Germany (GDR)	1:23:39
5	Guillaume LeBlanc	Canada (CAN)	1:23:51
6	Sergey Protishin	Soviet Union (URS)	1:23:54
7	Miguel Ángel Prieto	Spain (ESP)	1:24:04
8	Carlo Mattioli	Italy (ITA)	1:24:14
9	Nikolay Polozov	Soviet Union (URS)	1:24:37
10	Pavol Blažek	Czechoslovakia (TCH)	1:24:51
11	Anatoliy Gorshkov	Soviet Union (URS)	1:25:00
12	Simon Baker	Australia (AUS)	1:25:32
13	Roman Mrázek	Czechoslovakia (TCH)	1:25:42
14	Werner Heyer	East Germany (GDR)	1:25:58
15	Alessandro Pezzatini	Italy (ITA)	1:26:17
16	Jacek Herok	Poland (POL)	1:26:41
17	Ralf Kowalsky	East Germany (GDR)	1:26:51
18	Héctor Moreno	Colombia (COL)	1:26:54
19	Jan Kłos	Poland (POL)	1:27:10
20	Ian McCombie	Great Britain (GBR)	1:27:15
21	Antonio González	Spain (ESP)	1:27:26
22	Jacek Bednarek	Poland (POL)	1:28:10
23	Martin Rush	Great Britain (GBR)	1:28:12
24	Zdzisław Szlapkin	Poland (POL)	1:28:45
25	Andrej Rubarth	East Germany (GDR)	1:28:51
26	Paul Wick	United States (USA)	1:28:54
27	Andrew Jachno	Australia (AUS)	1:29:00
28	Tim Lewis	United States (USA)	1:30:02
30	Stefan Johansson	Sweden (SWE)	1:30:23
31	Todd Scully	United States (USA)	1:30:31
32	Jaroslav Makovec	Czechoslovakia (TCH)	1:31:05
33	Ricardo Lamprena	Colombia (COL)	1:31:14
34	Walter Arena	Italy (ITA)	1:31:24
35	Ulf-Peter Sjöholm	Sweden (SWE)	1:31:27
36	Philip Vesty	Great Britain (GBR)	1:31:38
37	Abdel Wahab Ferguène	Algeria (ALG)	1:32:51
38	Querubín Moreno	Colombia (COL)	1:32:59
39	Daniel Levesque	Canada (CAN)	1:33:15
40	Andrés Marín	Spain (ESP)	1:33:20
41	Mark Easton	Great Britain (GBR)	1:33:24
44	Michel Lafortune	Canada (CAN)	1:34:57
45	Andy Kaestner	United States (USA)	1:35:11
46	Clodomiro Moreno	Colombia (COL)	1:35:35
47	Paul Turpin	Canada (CAN)	1:36:10
49	Thomas Pomozi	Sweden (SWE)	1:37:39
50	Benamar Kechkouche	Algeria (ALG)	1:37:57
51	Michael Harvey	Australia (AUS)	1:39:03
52	Abderrahmane Djébbar	Algeria (ALG)	1:40:52
53	Pius Munyasia	Kenya (KEN)	1:42:29
54	mqrta Bouhalla	Algeria (ALG)	1:43:14
55	John Mutinda	Kenya (KEN)	1:54:32
—	Dave Smith	Australia (AUS)	DQ
—	Sándor Kanya	Hungary (HUN)	DQ
—	Imre Stankovics	Hungary (HUN)	DQ
—	János Szálas	Hungary (HUN)	DQ
—	John Maundu	Kenya (KEN)	DQ
—	Jan Staaf	Sweden (SWE)	DQ
—	Igor Kollár	Czechoslovakia (TCH)	DQ
—	Jozef Pribilinec	Czechoslovakia (TCH)	DQ
—	Li Baoyin	China (CHN)	DNF
—	Qian Ku	China (CHN)	DNF
—	Sun Xiaoguang	China (CHN)	DNF
—	Zhang Fuxin	China (CHN)	DNF

=== Men's 50 km ===
Place	Athlete	Nation	Time
1st place, gold medalist(s)	Hartwig Gauder	East Germany (GDR)	3:47:31
2nd place, silver medalist(s)	Andrey Perlov	Soviet Union (URS)	3:49:23
3rd place, bronze medalist(s)	Axel Noack	East Germany (GDR)	3:56:53
4	Alessandro Bellucci	Italy (ITA)	3:58:22
5	Raffaello Ducceschi	Italy (ITA)	3:59:55
6	Dietmar Meisch	East Germany (GDR)	4:00:03
7	Valeriy Suntsov	Soviet Union (URS)	4:01:31
8	Jorge Llopart	Spain (ESP)	4:02:55
9	Manuel Alcalde	Spain (ESP)	4:04:52
10	Massimo Quiriconi	Italy (ITA)	4:05:35
11	Willi Sawall	Australia (AUS)	4:06:38
12	Gregorz Ledzion	Poland (POL)	4:08:07
13	Qian Ku	China (CHN)	4:08:23
14	Pavol Jati	Czechoslovakia (TCH)	4:09:16
15	Venyamin Nikolayev	Soviet Union (URS)	4:09:37
16	Marco Evoniuk	United States (USA)	4:11:03
17	Les Morton	Great Britain (GBR)	4:11:32
18	Dennis Jackson	Great Britain (GBR)	4:12:11
19	Carl Schueler	United States (USA)	4:13:14
20	Giorgio Damilano	Italy (ITA)	4:14:56
21	Ivo Pták	Czechoslovakia (TCH)	4:14:43
22	Zhang Fuxin	China (CHN)	4:16:23
23	Pavel Szikora	Czechoslovakia (TCH)	4:16:55
24	Zbigniew Wiśniowski	Poland (POL)	4:17:43
25	Li Baoyin	China (CHN)	4:19:46
26	Martin Archambault	Canada (CAN)	4:21:46
27	Rafael Espejo	Spain (ESP)	4:23:56
28	Pierre Ekvall	Sweden (SWE)	4:25:09
29	Paul Blagg	Great Britain (GBR)	4:26:21
30	Christer Forsström	Sweden (SWE)	4:26:21
31	Mauricio Cortés	Colombia (COL)	4:28:19
32	Dan OʼConnor	United States (USA)	4:28:34
33	Ian Fay	Australia (AUS)	4:29:16
34	Randy Mimm	United States (USA)	4:31:14
35	Zbigniew Sadlej	Poland (POL)	4:34:52
36	Josef Hudak	Czechoslovakia (TCH)	4:35:19
37	Sun Xiaoguang	China (CHN)	4:38:13
38	Samuel Ginés	Spain (ESP)	4:39:46
39	Barry Graham	Great Britain (GBR)	4:48:27
40	Enrique Peña	Colombia (COL)	4:51:44
41	Ernesto Alfaro	Colombia (COL)	4:55:27
42	Harry Summers	Australia (AUS)	4:56:58
43	Rashid Chege	Kenya (KEN)	5:00:51
44	Mark Henderson	Canada (CAN)	5:02:31
—	Bill Dyer	Australia (AUS)	DQ
—	François Lapointe	Canada (CAN)	DQ
—	William Sawe	Kenya (KEN)	DQ
—	Bo Gustafsson	Sweden (SWE)	DQ
—	Abdel Wahab Ferguène	Algeria (ALG)	DNF
—	Benamar Kechkouche	Algeria (ALG)	DNF
—	Ronald Weigel	East Germany (GDR)	DNF
—	Bohdan Bułakowski	Poland (POL)	DNF
—	Roland Nilsson	Sweden (SWE)	DNF

=== Team (men) ===
The team rankings, named Lugano Trophy, combined the 20 km and 50 km events team results.

Place	Country	Points
1st place, gold medalist(s)	East Germany	234 pts
2nd place, silver medalist(s)	Soviet Union	234 pts
3rd place, bronze medalist(s)	Italy	233 pts
4	Spain	206 pts
5	Czechoslovakia	170 pts
6	Poland	154 pts
7	United Kingdom	141 pts
8	United States	135 pts
9	Australia	124 pts
10	Colombia	101 pts
11	Canada	93 pts
12	Sweden	82 pts
13	China	80 pts
14	Algeria	30 pts
15	Kenya	20 pts
—	Hungary	DQ
—	Mexico	DNS

=== Women's 10 km ===
Place	Athlete	Nation	Time
1st place, gold medalist(s)	Yan Hong	China (CHN)	46:22
2nd place, silver medalist(s)	Guan Ping	China (CHN)	46:23
3rd place, bronze medalist(s)	Olga Krishtop	Soviet Union (URS)	46:24
3rd place, bronze medalist(s)	Aleksandra Grigoryeva	Soviet Union (URS)	46:24
5	Xu Yongjiu	China (CHN)	46:32
6	Vera Osipova	Soviet Union (URS)	46:41
7	Ann Peel	Canada (CAN)	46:31
8	Li Sujie	China (CHN)	46:51
9	Natalya Serbiyenko	Soviet Union (URS)	46:55
10	Kerry Saxby-Junna	Australia (AUS)	47:11
11	Ann Jansson	Sweden (SWE)	47:16
12	Dana Vavřačová	Czechoslovakia (TCH)	47:41
13	Janice McCaffrey	Canada (CAN)	48:10
14	Susan Orr-Cook	Australia (AUS)	48:17
15	Monica Gunnarsson	Sweden (SWE)	48:20
16	Maria Grazia Cogoli	Italy (ITA)	48:38
17	Antonella Marangoni	Italy (ITA)	48:42
18	Sirkka Oikarinen	Finland (FIN)	48:50
19	Gunhild Kristiansen	Denmark (DEN)	49:06
20	Maryanne Torellas	United States (USA)	49:08
21	Alison Baker	Canada (CAN)	49:12
22	Mari Cruz Díaz	Spain (ESP)	49:19
23	María Reyes Sobrino	Spain (ESP)	49:31
24	Teresa Vaill	United States (USA)	49:37
25	Lisa Langford	Great Britain (GBR)	49:45
26	Lorraine Young-Jachno	Australia (AUS)	50:06
27	Helena Åström	Finland (FIN)	50:26
28	Helen Elleker	Great Britain (GBR)	50:28
29	Debbi Lawrence	United States (USA)	50:29
30	Emilia Cano	Spain (ESP)	50:54
31	Sue Narbey	Australia (AUS)	51:03
32	Jana Zárubová	Czechoslovakia (TCH)	51:16
33	Karin Jensen	Denmark (DEN)	51:30
34	Micheline Daneau	Canada (CAN)	51:45
35	Esther Lopez	United States (USA)	51:55
36	Maria Sehlin	Sweden (SWE)	51:56
37	Margareta Olsson	Sweden (SWE)	52:06
38	Mirva Hämäläinen	Finland (FIN)	52:14
39	Beverley Allen	Great Britain (GBR)	52:16
40	Rosanna Feroldi	Italy (ITA)	52:38
41	Pier Carola Pagani	Italy (ITA)	53:05
42	Lene Cassidy	Denmark (DEN)	53:36
43	Karen Nipper	Great Britain (GBR)	53:53
44	Marta Hrubanová	Czechoslovakia (TCH)	54:58
45	Dana Semelová	Czechoslovakia (TCH)	55:05
—	Rosa Sierra	Spain (ESP)	DQ
—	Ulla Kristiansen	Denmark (DEN)	DNF
—	Sari Essayah	Finland (FIN)	DNF

=== Team (women) ===
Place	Country	Points
1st place, gold medalist(s)	China	104 pts
2nd place, silver medalist(s)	Soviet Union	98 pts
3rd place, bronze medalist(s)	Canada	74 pts
4	Australia	67 pts
5	Sweden	58 pts
6	Italy	48 pts
7	United States	44 pts
8	Spain	42 pts
9	Finland	38 pts
10	Czechoslovakia	36 pts
11	Denmark	29 pts
12	United Kingdom	29 pts

== Participation ==
The participation of 158 athletes (110 men/48 women) from countries is reported.

- Algeria (4/-)
- Australia (8/4)
- Canada (7/4)
- China (4/4)
- Colombia (7/-)
- Denmark (-/4)
- East Germany (8/-)
- Finland (-/4)
- Hungary (3/-)
- Italy (8/4)
- Kenya (5/-)
- Poland (8/-)
- Soviet Union (7/4)
- Spain (8/4)
- Sweden (8/4)
- Czechoslovakia (9/4)
- United Kingdom (8/4)
- United States (8/4)

== Qualifying rounds ==
In 1985, there were qualifying rounds for both men's and women's competition with the first two winners proceeding to the final.

=== Men ===
This year, the Soviet Union, Italy, México, the United Kingdom, the United States, Algeria, Australia, China, Canada, Colombia, and Kenya proceeded directly to the final. México withdrew due to the Mexico City earthquake.

The countries qualifying for the final are highlighted in green

==== Zone 1 ====
Saint-Aubin-lès-Elbeuf, France, June 22/23

Rank	Nation	Points
1	Spain	85 pts
2	Poland	85 pts
3	France	82 pts
4	Netherlands	37 pts
5	Belgium	37 pts
6	Luxembourg	15 pts

==== Zone 2 ====
Borås, Sweden, June 15

Rank	Nation	Points
1	East Germany	62 pts
2	Sweden	40 pts
3	Finland	29 pts
3	Norway	27 pts

==== Zone 3 ====
Russe, Bulgaria, June 22/23

Rank	Nation	Points
1	Czechoslovakia	99 pts
2	Hungary	74 pts
3	Bulgaria	45 pts
4	West Germany	44 pts
5	Greece	44 pts
6	Switzerland	28 pts

=== Women ===
This year, China, the Soviet Union, Australia, the United Kingdom, the United States, and Canada proceeded directly to the final.

The countries qualifying for the final are highlighted in green

==== Zone 1 ====
Borås, Sweden, June 15

Rank	Nation	Points
1	Sweden	20 pts
2	Finland	18 pts
3	Norway	8 pts
—	United Kingdom	^{*}

^{*}: competed as non-scorers

==== Zone 2 ====
Russe, Bulgaria, June 22

Rank	Nation	Points
1	Denmark	48 pts
2	Czechoslovakia	42 pts
3	West Germany	35 pts
4	Hungary	24 pts
5	Bulgaria	14 pts
6	Switzerland	9 pts

==== Zone 3 ====
Saint-Aubin-lès-Elbeuf, France, June 2

Rank	Nation	Points
1	Spain	39 pts
2	Italy	34 pts
3	Poland	23 pts
4	France	19 pts
5	Belgium	6 pts
