= 1983 World Championships in Athletics – Men's 50 kilometres walk =

These are the official results of the men's 50 kilometres walk event at the 1983 World Championships held on 12 August 1983 in Helsinki, Finland.

== Medalists ==
Gold	Ronald Weigel; East Germany (GDR)
Silver	Josep Marín; Spain (ESP)
Bronze	Sergey Yung; Soviet Union (URS)

== Abbreviations ==
- All times shown are in hours:minutes:seconds

DNS	did not start
NM	no mark
WR	world record
WL	world leading
AR	area record
NR	national record
PB	personal best
SB	season best

== Records ==
Standing records prior to the 1983 World Athletics Championships
World Record	Josep Marín (ESP)	3:40:46	March 13, 1983	Valencia, Spain
Event Record	New event			

== Final ranking ==
Rank	Athlete	Time	Note
1st place, gold medalist(s)	Ronald Weigel (GDR)	3:43:08	
2nd place, silver medalist(s)	Josep Marín (ESP)	3:46:32	(Note: Erroneously given by several sources as 3:43:42.)
3rd place, bronze medalist(s)	Sergey Yung (URS)	3:49:03	
4	Reima Salonen (FIN)	3:52:53	
5	Raúl González (MEX)	3:53:51	
6	François Lapointe (CAN)	3:53:57	
7	Sandro Bellucci (ITA)	3:55:38	
8	Viktor Dorovskikh (URS)	3:56:02	
9	Marco Evoniuk (USA)	3:56:57	
10	Bengt Simonsen (SWE)	3:57:25	
11	Pavol Szikora (TCH)	3:59:03	
12	László Sator (HUN)	3:59:27	
13	Lars Ove Moen (NOR)	4:00:50	
14	Seppo Immonen (FIN)	4:02:00	
15	Manuel Alcalde (ESP)	4:03:10	
16	José Pinto (POR)	4:03:47	
17	Pavol Blažek (TCH)	4:06:49	
18	Karl Degener (FRG)	4:06:51	
19	Lennart Mether (SWE)	4:07:46	
20	Miklós Domján (HUN)	4:08:11	
21	Felix Goméz (MEX)	4:09:22	
22	Dominique Guebey (FRA)	4:09:40	
23	Dan O'Connor (USA)	4:18:41	
24	Dai Mingxi (CHN)	4:30:28	
25	Zhang Fuxin (CHN)	4:35:46	
26	Osvaldo Morejón (BOL)	4:35:58	
DID NOT FINISH (DNF)
—	Bohdan Bułakowski (POL)	DNF	
—	Bo Gustafsson (SWE)	DNF	
—	Jim Heiring (USA)	DNF	
—	Gérard Lelièvre (FRA)	DNF	
—	Jordi Llopart (ESP)	DNF	
DISQUALIFIED (DSQ)
—	Nikolay Udovenko (URS)	DSQ	
—	Bogusław Duda (POL)	DSQ	
—	Dietmar Meisch (GDR)	DSQ	
—	Erling Andersen (NOR)	DSQ	
—	Martín Bermúdez (MEX)	DSQ	

== See also ==
- 1978 Men's European Championships 50km Walk (Prague)
- 1980 Men's Olympic 50km Walk (Moscow)
- 1982 Men's European Championships 50km Walk (Athens)
- 1984 Men's Olympic 50km Walk (Los Angeles)
- 1986 Men's European Championships 50km Walk (Stuttgart)
- 1988 Men's Olympic 50km Walk (Seoul)
