= 1978 European Athletics Championships – Men's 50 kilometres walk =

Men's 50 kilometres walk at the European Athletics Championships

The men's 50 kilometres race walk at the 1978 European Athletics Championships was held in Prague, then Czechoslovakia, on 2 September 1978.

== Medalists ==
Gold	Jorge Llopart; Spain
Silver	Venyamin Soldatenko; Soviet Union
Bronze	Jan Ornoch; Poland

== Results ==
=== Final ===
2 September

Rank	Name	Nationality	Time	Notes
1st place, gold medalist(s)	Jorge Llopart	Spain	3:53:29.9	CR
2nd place, silver medalist(s)	Venyamin Soldatenko	Soviet Union	3:55:12.1	
3rd place, bronze medalist(s)	Jan Ornoch	Poland	3:55:15.9	
4	Otto Barch	Soviet Union	3:57:23.7	
5	Viktor Dorovskiy	Soviet Union	3:57:26.7	
6	Vittorio Visini	Italy	3:57:42.8	
7	Sandro Bellucci	Italy	3:58:25.9	
8	Olaf Pilarski	East Germany	4:00:03.8	
9	Mathias Kroel	East Germany	4:00:11.9	
10	Mario Kreber	East Germany	4:01:03.7	
11	Bengt Simonsen	Sweden	4:03:34.6	
12	Gerhard Weidner	West Germany	4:04:01.9	
13	Hans Binder	West Germany	4:04:12.4	
14	Ján Dzurňák	Czechoslovakia	4:04:40.0	
15	Paolo Grecucci	Italy	4:05:46.8	
16	Ladislav Vitéz	Czechoslovakia	4:07:55.8	
17	Lennart Lundgren	Sweden	4:09:54.7	
18	Dominique Guebey	France	4:09:57.0	
19	László Sátor	Hungary	4:10:22.4	
20	Stig-Olaf Elofsson	Sweden	4:12:39.1	
21	Seppo Immonen	Finland	4:16:52.5	
22	Cornel Patusinschi	Romania	4:23:26.9	
23	Ian Richards	Great Britain	4:27:09.3	
	David Cotton	Great Britain	DNF	
	Lars Ove Moen	Norway	DNF	
	Gérard Lelièvre	France	DNF	
	Lucien Faber	Luxembourg	DNF	
	José Marín	Spain	DNF	
	Agustín Jorba	Spain	DNF	
	Reima Salonen	Finland	DNF	
	Bogusław Kmiecik	Poland	DNF	
	Erling Andersen	Norway	DNF	
	Jaromír Vaňous	Czechoslovakia	DNF	
	Bohdan Bułakowski	Poland	DNF	
	Heinrich Schubert	West Germany	DQ	
	Yancho Kamenov	Bulgaria	DQ	

== Participation ==
According to an unofficial count, 36 athletes from 16 countries participated in the event.

- Bulgaria (1)
- Czechoslovakia (3)
- East Germany (3)
- Finland (2)
- France (2)
- Hungary (1)
- Italy (3)
- Luxembourg (1)
- Norway (2)
- Poland (3)
- Romania (1)
- Soviet Union (3)
- Spain (3)
- Sweden (3)
- Great Britain (2)
- West Germany (3)
