= Athletics at the 1985 Summer Universiade – Women's 5000 metres walk =

The women's 5000 metres walk event at the 1985 Summer Universiade was held at the Kobe Universiade Memorial Stadium in Kobe on 30 August. It was the first time that any racewalking event was contested by women at the Universiade.

== Results ==
Rank	Athlete	Nationality	Time	Notes
1st place, gold medalist(s)	Aleksandra Grigoryeva	Soviet Union	22:21.10	
2nd place, silver medalist(s)	Yan Hong	China	22:25.77	
3rd place, bronze medalist(s)	Natalya Serbinenko	Soviet Union	22:27.21	
4	Ann Peel	Canada	22:44.51	
5	Xu Yongjiu	China	23:32.50	
6	Lorraine Jachno	Australia	23:35.90	
7	Sally Pierson	Australia	24:07.90	
8	Asami Suzuki	Japan	25:39.62	
9	Carol Brown	United States	26:07.87	
	Julie Wunrow	United States	DQ	
