= Athletics at the 1984 Summer Olympics – Men's 50 kilometres walk =

Men's 50 kilometres walk at the Games of the XXIII Olympiad
- Venue: Los Angeles Memorial Coliseum
- Date: August 11
- Competitors: 31 from 15 nations
- Winning time: 3:47:26 OR

Medalists
1st place, gold medalist(s)		Raúl González; Mexico
2nd place, silver medalist(s)		Bo Gustafsson; Sweden
3rd place, bronze medalist(s)		Sandro Bellucci; Italy

The Men's 50 km Race Walk at the 1984 Summer Olympics in Los Angeles, California had an entry list of 31 competitors. Five athletes were disqualified, while nine walkers did not finish the race, held on August 11, 1984.

== Medalists ==
Gold	Raúl González; Mexico
Silver	Bo Gustafsson; Sweden
Bronze	Sandro Bellucci; Italy

== Abbreviations ==
DNS	did not start
NM	no mark
OR	olympic record
WR	world record
AR	area record
NR	national record
PB	personal best
SB	season best

== Final ranking ==
Rank	Athlete	Time	Note
1st place, gold medalist(s)	Raúl González (MEX)	3:47:26	
2nd place, silver medalist(s)	Bo Gustafsson (SWE)	3:53:19	
3rd place, bronze medalist(s)	Sandro Bellucci (ITA)	3:53:45	
4	Reima Salonen (FIN)	3:58:30	
5	Raffaello Ducceschi (ITA)	3:59:26	
6	Carl Schueler (USA)	3:59:46	
7	Jordi Llopart (ESP)	4:03:09	
8	José Pinto (POR)	4:04:42	
9	Manuel Alcalde (ESP)	4:05:47	
10	Ernesto Canto (MEX)	4:07:59	
11	Michael Harvey (AUS)	4:09:18	
12	Dominique Guebey (FRA)	4:13:34	
13	Lars Ove Moen (NOR)	4:15:12	
14	Vince O'Sullivan (USA)	4:22:51	
15	Zhang Fuxin (CHN)	4:23:39	
16	Chris Maddocks (GBR)	4:26:33	
17	José Víctor Alonzo (GUA)	4:36:35	
DID NOT FINISH (DNF)
—	Andrew Jachno (AUS)	DNF	
—	Gérard Lelièvre (FRA)	DNF	
—	Guillaume LeBlanc (CAN)	DNF	
—	Querubín Moreno (COL)	DNF	
—	Marcel Jobin (CAN)	DNF	
—	Marco Evoniuk (USA)	DNF	
—	Maurizio Damilano (ITA)	DNF	
—	Osvaldo Morejón (BOL)	DNF	
—	Willi Sawall (AUS)	DNF	
DISQUALIFIED (DSQ)
—	Bengt Simonsen (SWE)	DSQ	
—	Erling Andersen (NOR)	DSQ	
—	François Lapointe (CAN)	DSQ	
—	Martín Bermúdez (MEX)	DSQ	
—	Roland Nilsson (SWE)	DSQ	

== See also ==
- 1982 Men's European Championships 50 km Walk (Athens)
- 1983 Men's World Championships 50 km Walk (Helsinki)
- 1984 Men's Friendship Games 50 km Walk (Moscow)
- 1986 Men's European Championships 50 km Walk (Stuttgart)
- 1987 Men's World Championships 50 km Walk (Rome)
