= Athletics at the Friendship Games – Men's 50 kilometres walk =

The men's 50 kilometres walk event at the Friendship Games was held on 18 August 1984 in Moscow, Soviet Union.

== Results ==
Rank	Name	Nationality	Time	Notes
1st place, gold medalist(s)	Andrey Perlov	Soviet Union	3:43:06	
2nd place, silver medalist(s)	Pavol Szikora	Czechoslovakia	3:45:53	
–	Oleg Andreyev	Soviet Union	3:52:59	
–	Venyamin Nikolayev	Soviet Union	3:54:10	
3rd place, bronze medalist(s)	Viktor Dorovskikh	Soviet Union	3:58:47	
–	Vladimir Dushko	Soviet Union	3:59:08	
4	Jozef Hudák	Czechoslovakia	3:59:16	
5	László Sator	Hungary	4:07:28	
6	Ivo Pitak	Czechoslovakia	4:12:29	
	Valeriy Suntsov	Soviet Union	DQ	
	Matti Katila	Finland	DQ	

== See also ==
- Athletics at the 1984 Summer Olympics – Men's 50 kilometres walk
