= Natalya Serbinenko =

Ukrainian racewalker

Personal information
- Born: 27 January 1959 (age 67)

Sport
- Sport: Race walking
Medal record
Representing Soviet Union
Summer Universiade
Bronze medal – third place	1985 Kobe	10 km walk
IAAF World Race Walking Cup
Silver medal – second place	1983 Bergen	10 km walk

Natalya Serbinenko (née Sharipova; born 27 January 1959) is a Ukrainian former racewalker. She competed six times at the IAAF World Race Walking Cup, with her best result coming in 1983, where she was silver medallist behind Xu Yongjiu of China. With four consecutive appearances from 1981 to 1989, she was the most capped athlete for the Soviet Union ever at that competition. She represented Ukraine in her last appearance at the tournament in 1993.

At the first ever women's race walk at the Summer Universiade in 1985 she took a bronze medal, sharing the podium with fellow Soviet Aleksandra Grigoryeva and Yan Hong of China. At national level she won once at the Soviet Athletics Championships (1983) and once at the Ukrainian Athletics Championships (1993).

Serbinenko was highly ranked during the early years of international women's walking, placing in the top three globally in both the 5000 m and 10,000 m walks in 1982 and ranking second in the world in 1983.

== International competitions ==
Year	Competition	Venue	Position	Event	Notes
1981	IAAF World Race Walking Cup	Valencia, Spain	10th	5 km walk	24:20.7
1983	IAAF World Race Walking Cup	Bergen, Norway	2nd	10 km walk	45:26
1985	Universiade	Kobe, Japan	3rd	5000 m walk	22:27.21
1985	IAAF World Race Walking Cup	St John's, Isle of Man	9th	10 km walk	46:55
1987	IAAF World Race Walking Cup	New York City, United States	8th	10 km walk	45:05
1989	IAAF World Race Walking Cup	Barcelona, Spain	4th	10 km walk	43:46
1993	IAAF World Race Walking Cup	Monterrey, Mexico	32nd	10 km walk	49:25

== National titles ==
- Soviet Athletics Championships
  - 10 km road walk: 1983
- Ukrainian Athletics Championships
  - 10,000 m track walk: 1993
