= Athletics at the 1981 Summer Universiade – Men's 20 kilometres walk =

The men's 20 kilometres walk at the 1981 Summer Universiade was held in Bucharest on 23 July 1981. It was the first time that racewalking was contested at the Universiade.

== Results ==
Rank	Athlete	Nationality	Time	Notes
1st place, gold medalist(s)	Maurizio Damilano	Italy	1:26:47	UR
2nd place, silver medalist(s)	Carlo Mattioli	Italy	1:28:10	
3rd place, bronze medalist(s)	Liodor Pescaru	Romania	1:28:56	
4	Ștefan Ioniță	Romania	1:30:49	
5	Valeriy Suntsov	Soviet Union	1:32:24	
6	Gennadiy Terekhov	Soviet Union	1:40:09	
7	Raymond Sharp	United States	1:43:41	
8	Peter Timmons	United States	1:53:00	
