= Sergey Yung =

Russian former race walker (born 1955)

Medal record

Men's athletics

Representing the Soviet Union

World Championships
| Bronze medal – third place | 1983 Helsinki | 50 km walk |

IAAF World Race Walking Cup
| Silver medal – second place | 1983 Bergen | 50 km walk |

Sergey Aleksandrovich Yung (Russian: Серге́й Александрович Юнг; born 10 August 1955) is a Russian former race walker who competed for the Soviet Union. He specialised in the 50 kilometres race walk.

Yung set his personal best of 3:47:16 hours for the event in Moscow in 1982. He competed at the 1982 European Athletics Championships and placed tenth overall.

The 1983 season saw his greatest successes. He began with the silver medal at the 1983 IAAF World Race Walking Cup, finishing behind Mexico's Raúl González. He followed this with a win at the Spartakiad, becoming the Soviet champion. The first World Championships in Athletics was held in Helsinki later that year and Yung was the bronze medallist there, beaten only by Ronald Weigel and José Marín.
