= Vincent O'Sullivan =

Vincent O'Sullivan may refer to:

- Vincent O'Sullivan (American writer) (1868–1940), American-born short story writer, poet and critic
- Vincent O'Sullivan (New Zealand writer) (1937–2024), New Zealand poet, short story writer, novelist, playwright, critic and editor
- Vince O'Sullivan (born 1957), racewalker

== See also ==
- Vin Sullivan (1911–1999), American comic book editor, artist and publisher
- Vinny Sullivan (born 1981), Irish footballer
