= Jacek Bednarek =

Polish racewalker and businessman

Personal information
- Full name: Jacek Bednarek
- Citizenship: Polish (Polish-German ethnicity)
- Born: 27 January 1964 (age 62) Rybnik
- Height: 174 cm (5 ft 9 in)

Sport
- Country: Poland
- Sport: Athletics, Racewalking
- Club: ROW Rybnik
Medal record
Polish Athletics Championships
Gold medal – first place	Warsaw 1989	50 kilometres race walk
Bronze medal – third place	Lublin 1984	20 kilometres race walk

Jacek Bednarek (born 27 January 1964 in Rybnik, Śląskie) is a male former racewalker from Poland, who represented his native country at the 1988 Summer Olympics. He set his personal best (3:51.34) in the men's 50 km walk event in 1988. He set a Polish national record in the 50 km walk.

He took part in the 1988 Olympics in Seoul where he was 24th in a 50-kilometer race walk. He was a World Race Walking Cup participant on five occasions.

Bednarek was the 1989 Polish champion in the 50 km walk and a bronze medalist in 1984 in the 20 km walk. For most of his career, he was a ROW Rybnik member.

== International competitions ==
Year	Competition	Venue	Position	Event	Notes
1985	World Race Walking Cup	St John's, Isle of Man, United Kingdom	22nd	20 kilometre race walk	1:28:10
1987	World Race Walking Cup	New York City, United States	31st	20 kilometre race walk	1:26:20
1989	World Race Walking Cup	L'Hospitalet de Llobregat, Spain	21st	50 kilometres race walk	4:00:43
1991	World Race Walking Cup	San Jose, California, United States	22nd	50 kilometres race walk	4:03:31
1993	World Race Walking Cup	Monterrey, Mexico	DNF	50 kilometres race walk	—

== Personal bests ==
- 5 kilometres race walk (indoor) – 19:20,66 (February 21, 1987, Liévin) – 8th result in the history of Polish athletics
- 20 kilometres race walk – 1:24:19 (September 13, 1986, Warsaw)
- 50 kilometres race walk – 3:51:34 (July 31, 1988, Södertälje) – 13th result in the history of Polish athletics
- 50 kilometres race walk – 3:52:53,0 (May 15, 1992, Bergen (Fana)) – Polish record
