= Guan Ping (race walker) =

Chinese racewalker (born 1966)

Medal record

Women's athletics

Representing China

Asian Games
Gold medal – first place	1986 Seoul	10 km walk

IAAF World Race Walking Cup
Silver medal – second place	1985 St John's	10 km walk

Guan Ping (born 1 February 1966) is a female Chinese former racewalking athlete who competed in the 10 kilometres race walk. She was the gold medallist at the 1986 Asian Games, becoming the first female racewalk champion at that competition and starting China's unbeaten dominance of the Asian Games women's racewalk which extends to today.

Guan competed at the 1987 World Championships in Athletics, but failed to finish the distance after being disqualified. She represented China three times at the IAAF World Race Walking Cup, with her best result being a silver medal in 1985, which helped China to the team title alongside the winner Yan Hong. She was also a silver medallist at the 1986 Goodwill Games, finishing after Australia's Kerry Saxby.

Her personal best of 42:50.0 minutes for the 10,000 m track walk was set in 1992. Her highest global ranking was second in 1985, courtesy of her World Race Walking Cup performance. She was also third on the seasonal rankings in 1986, only behind Soviets Yelena Kuznetsova and Irina Strakhova.

== International competitions ==
Year	Competition	Venue	Position	Event	Notes
1983	IAAF World Race Walking Cup	Bergen, Norway	6th	10 km walk	46:29
1985	IAAF World Race Walking Cup	St John's, United Kingdom	2nd	10 km walk	46:23
1986	Goodwill Games	Moscow, Soviet Union	2nd	10,000 m walk	45:56.50
1986	Asian Games	Seoul, South Korea	1st	10 km walk	48:40 GR
1987	IAAF World Race Walking Cup	New York City, United States	—	10 km walk	DQ
1987	World Championships	Rome, Italy	—	10 km walk	DQ
