= Anatoliy Gorshkov =

Ukrainian racewalker

Medal record

Men's athletics

Representing the Soviet Union

IAAF World Race Walking Cup
Bronze medal – third place	1987 New York	20 km walk

Anatoliy Gorshkov (Ukrainian: Анатолій Горшков; born 4 August 1958) is a Ukrainian former racewalking athlete who competed mainly in the 20 kilometres race walk event. His best result was a bronze medal at the 1987 IAAF World Race Walking Cup, where he achieved his lifetime best of 1:20:04 hours for the 20 km walk.

He twice represented the Soviet Union at the World Championships in Athletics, competing in 1983 and 1987. He competed five times at the IAAF World Race Walking Cup, including twice for Ukraine in 1995 and 1997. In the latter year, he took part in the 50 kilometres race walk and achieved a best of 4:01:01 hours.

His highest seasonal European ranking was third in 1987, behind fellow Soviet Viktor Mostovik and East Germany's Axel Noack.

== International competitions ==
Year	Competition	Venue	Position	Event	Notes
1983	IAAF World Race Walking Cup	Bergen, Norway	8th	20 km walk	1:21:26
1983	World Championships	Helsinki, Finland	11th	20 km walk	1:22:34
1985	IAAF World Race Walking Cup	St John's, United Kingdom	11th	20 km walk	1:25:00
1987	IAAF World Race Walking Cup	New York City, United States	3rd	20 km walk	1:20:04
1987	World Championships	Rome, Italy	26th	20 km walk	1:27.34
1995	IAAF World Race Walking Cup	Beijing, China	49th	20 km walk	1:27:33
1997	IAAF World Race Walking Cup	Poděbrady, Czech Republic	38th	50 km walk	4:01:01
