= Yevgeniy Ivchenko =

Soviet racewalker

Personal information
- Born: 26 June 1938 Sumy Oblast
- Died: 2 June 1999 (aged 60)
Medal record
Men's Athletics
Representing the Soviet Union
Olympic Games
Bronze medal – third place	1980 Moscow	50 km walk

Yevgeniy Ivchenko (Russian: Евгений Ивченко, Belarusian: Яўген Іўчанка; 26 June 1938 in Sumy Oblast, Ukrainian SSR – 2 June 1999) was a Soviet and Belarusian athlete from Ukraine who competed mainly in the 50 km walk. He trained at Trudovye Rezervy in Minsk.

Technically, Ivchenko was born in Kharkiv Oblast before establishment of Sumy Oblast (1939). He competed for the USSR in the 1980 Summer Olympics held in Moscow, Soviet Union in the 50 kilometre walk where he won the bronze medal. He also competed in the 20 kilometre walk in the 1972 Munich Olympics.
