= Athletics at the 1980 Summer Olympics – Men's 50 kilometres walk =

Men's 50 kilometres walk at the Games of the XXII Olympiad
- Venue: Central Lenin Stadium
- Date: 30 July
- Competitors: 29 from 14 nations
- Winning time: 3:49:24

Medalists
| 1st place, gold medalist(s) | | Hartwig Gauder; East Germany |
| 2nd place, silver medalist(s) | | Jordi Llopart; Spain |
| 3rd place, bronze medalist(s) | | Yevgeniy Ivchenko; Soviet Union |

The Men's 50 km Race Walk at the 1980 Summer Olympics in Moscow, USSR had an entry list of 27 competitors. Three athletes were disqualified and nine of them did not finish in the final, held on 30 July 1980. This event was not held during 1976 Summer Olympics, returning to Olympic program after last returning to the program after a hiatus edition, because it was held in 1972.

This event netted Spain its first-ever medal in athletics, with Jordi Llopart taking silver.

== Medalists ==
| Gold | Hartwig Gauder; East Germany |
| Silver | Jordi Llopart; Spain |
| Bronze | Yevgeniy Ivchenko; Soviet Union |

== Final ranking ==
| Rank | Athlete | Time | Note |
|---|---|---|---|
| 1st place, gold medalist(s) | Hartwig Gauder (GDR) | 3:49:24 | |
| 2nd place, silver medalist(s) | Jordi Llopart (ESP) | 3:51:25 | |
| 3rd place, bronze medalist(s) | Yevgeniy Ivchenko (URS) | 3:56:32 | |
| 4 | Bengt Simonsen (SWE) | 3:57:08 | |
| 5 | Vyacheslav Fursov (URS) | 3:58:32 | |
| 6 | Josep Marín (ESP) | 4:03:08 | |
| 7 | Stanisław Rola (POL) | 4:07:07 | |
| 8 | Willi Sawall (AUS) | 4:08:25 | |
| 9 | László Sátor (HUN) | 4:10:53 | |
| 10 | Pavol Blažek (TCH) | 4:16:26 | |
| 11 | Ian Richards (GBR) | 4:22:57 | |
| 12 | Christos Karageorgos (GRE) | 4:24:36 | |
| 13 | Juraj Benčík (TCH) | 4:27:39 | |
| 14 | Enrique Peña (COL) | 4:29:27 | |
| 15 | Ernesto Alfaro (COL) | 4:46:28 | |
DID NOT FINISH (DNF)
| — | Bo Gustafsson (SWE) | DNF | |
| — | Bohdan Bułakowski (POL) | DNF | |
| — | Daniel Bautista (MEX) | DNF | |
| — | David Smith (AUS) | DNF | |
| — | Gérard Lelièvre (FRA) | DNF | |
| — | Martín Bermúdez (MEX) | DNF | |
| — | Raúl González (MEX) | DNF | |
| — | Reima Salonen (FIN) | DNF | |
| — | Borys Yakovlev (URS) | DNF | |
DISQUALIFIED (DSQ)
| — | Dietmar Meisch (GDR) | DSQ | |
| — | Jaromír Vaňous (TCH) | DSQ | |
| — | Uwe Dünkel (GDR) | DSQ | |

== See also ==
- 1982 Men's European Championships 50 km Walk (Athens)
- 1983 Men's World Championships 50 km Walk (Helsinki)
- 1986 Men's European Championships 50 km Walk (Stuttgart)
