= Osvaldo Morejón =

Bolivian racewalker (born 1959)

Personal information
- Nationality: Bolivian
- Born: 11 December 1959 (age 66)
- Height: 1.68 m (5 ft 6 in)
- Weight: 58 kg (128 lb)

Sport
- Sport: Athletics
- Event: Racewalking

Osvaldo Morejón (born 11 December 1959) is a Bolivian racewalker. He competed in the men's 20 kilometres walk at the 1984 Summer Olympics.

== Personal bests ==
- 20 kilometres walk – 1:32:30 (1983)
- 50 kilometres walk – 4:35:58 (1983)

== International competitions ==
Year	Competition	Venue	Position	Event	Notes
Representing Bolivia
1977	South American Championships	Montevideo, Uruguay	2nd	20 km walk	1:39:23
1978	Southern Cross Games	La Paz, Bolivia	1st	20 km walk	1:56:13
1981	South American Championships	La Paz, Bolivia	1st	20 km walk	1:51:22
1981	Bolivarian Games	Barquisimeto, Venezuela	6th	20 km walk	1:50:52
1982	Southern Cross Games	Santa Fe, Argentina	1st	20 km walk	1:37:06
1983	World Championships	Helsinki, Finland	26th	50 km walk	4:35:58
1983	South American Championships	Santa Fe, Argentina	3rd	20 km walk	1:32:20
1984	Olympic Games	Los Angeles, United States	36th	20 km walk	1:44:42
1984	Olympic Games	Los Angeles, United States	–	50 km walk	DNF
1989	Bolivarian Games	Maracaibo, Venezuela	6th	20 km walk	1:33:05
