= 1982 European Athletics Championships – Men's 20 kilometres walk =

Men's 20 kilometres walk at the European Athletics Championships

These are the official results of the Men's 20 km walk event at the 1982 European Championships in Athens, Greece, held on 7 September 1982.

== Medalists ==
Gold	José Marín; Spain (ESP)
Silver	Jozef Pribilinec; Czechoslovakia (TCH)
Bronze	Pavol Blažek; Czechoslovakia (TCH)

== Results ==
=== Final ===
7 September

Rank	Name	Nationality	Time	Notes
1st place, gold medalist(s)	José Marín	Spain	1:23:43	
2nd place, silver medalist(s)	Jozef Pribilinec	Czechoslovakia	1:25:55	
3rd place, bronze medalist(s)	Pavol Blažek	Czechoslovakia	1:26:13	
4	Gérard Lelièvre	France	1:26:30	
5	Alessandro Pezzatini	Italy	1:26:39	
6	Carlo Mattioli	Italy	1:26:56	
7	Nikolay Matveyev	Soviet Union	1:27:57	
8	Reima Salonen	Finland	1:28:04	
9	Roland Wieser	East Germany	1:29:11	
10	Pyotr Pochenchuk	Soviet Union	1:30:13	
11	Steve Barry	United Kingdom	1:31:00	
12	Martial Fesselier	France	1:32:23	
13	Ian McCombie	United Kingdom	1:32:36	
14	José Pinto	Portugal	1:34:19	
15	Lennart Mether	Sweden	1:35:09	
16	Jan Staaf	Sweden	1:37:37	
17	Franz-Josef Weber	West Germany	1:39:38	
18	Leif Christensen	Denmark	1:45:45	
	Bo Gustafsson	Sweden	DQ	
	Maurizio Damilano	Italy	DQ	
	Aristidis Karagiorgos	Greece	DQ	

== Participation ==
According to an unofficial count, 21 athletes from 13 countries participated in the event.

- Czechoslovakia (2)
- Denmark (1)
- East Germany (1)
- Finland (1)
- France (2)
- Greece (1)
- Italy (3)
- Portugal (1)
- Soviet Union (2)
- Spain (1)
- Sweden (3)
- United Kingdom (2)
- West Germany (1)

== See also ==
- 1980 Men's Olympic 20km Walk (Moscow)
- 1983 Men's World Championships 20km Walk (Helsinki)
- 1984 Men's Olympic 20km Walk (Los Angeles)
- 1987 Men's World Championships 20km Walk (Rome)
- 1988 Men's Olympic 20km Walk (Seoul)
