= Michael Harvey (race walker) =

Australian racewalker

Personal information
- Born: 5 December 1962 (age 63) Waverley, Victoria, Australia

Sport
- Sport: Race walking
- Club: Waverley Malvern

Michael Harvey (born 5 December 1962) is a retired male race walker from Australia.

He set his personal best (3:57.20) in the men's 50 km in 1993. His best international result was an eleventh in the 1984 Summer Olympics. Harvey is a five-time national champion in the men's 50 km event.

== Achievements ==
Year	Competition	Venue	Position	Event	Notes
Representing Australia
1981	World Race Walking Cup	Valencia, Spain	49th	20 km	
1983	World Race Walking Cup	Bergen, Norway	—	50 km	DNF
1984	Olympic Games	Los Angeles, United States	11th	50 km	4:09:18
1985	World Race Walking Cup	St John's, Isle of Man	51st	20 km	
1987	World Race Walking Cup	New York City, United States	63rd	50 km	
1987	World Championships	Rome, Italy	25th	50 km	4:11:04
1989	World Race Walking Cup	L'Hospitalet, Spain	67th	50 km	
1991	World Race Walking Cup	San Jose, United States	63rd	20 km	
1993	World Race Walking Cup	Monterrey, Mexico	27th	50 km	
1993	World Championships	Stuttgart, Germany	33rd	50 km	
1995	World Race Walking Cup	Beijing, PR China	41st	50 km	
1995	World Championships	Gothenburg, Sweden	26th	50 km	
1997	World Race Walking Cup	Poděbrady, Czech Republic	64th	50 km	
1999	World Race Walking Cup	Mézidon-Canon, France	61st	50 km	
