= Valeriy Suntsov =

Russian former racewalking athlete (born 1955)

Personal information
- Born: 10 July 1955 (age 70) Udmurtia, Soviet Union

Sport
- Sport: Racewalking
Medal record
Representing Soviet Union
European Championships
Bronze medal – third place	1986 Stuttgart	50 km walk

Valeriy Suntsov (Russian: Валерий Сунцов; born 10 July 1955) is a Russian former racewalking athlete who competed in the 50 kilometres race walk for the Soviet Union. He set his lifetime best of 3:42:37 hours for the event in 1985 in Saint Petersburg (then Leningrad).

He represented his country at the European Athletics Championships on two occasions, winning a bronze medal at the 1986 edition. He competed at the 1987 World Championships in Athletics but was disqualified for lifting. He was a key member of the Soviet team at the IAAF World Race Walking Cup, sharing in the team silver medals in 1981 and 1985 before taking gold at the 1987 IAAF World Race Walking Cup with a team including Vyacheslav Ivanenko, Andrey Perlov and Aleksandr Potashov.

Suntsov was ranked third among Europeans in the 1982 season, behind East German Ronald Weigel and fellow Soviet Viktor Dorovskikh. He was a one-time national champion taking the 50 km walk at the 1986 Soviet Athletics Championships.

== International competitions ==
Year	Competition	Venue	Position	Event	Notes
1981	World Race Walking Cup	Valencia, Spain	7th	50 km walk	4:01:30
1981	World Race Walking Cup	Valencia, Spain	2nd	Team	227 pts
1982	European Championships	Athens, Greece	7th	50 km walk	4:12.51
1984	Friendship Games	Moscow, Soviet Union	—	50 km walk	DSQ
1985	World Race Walking Cup	St John's, Isle of Man	7th	50 km walk	4:01:31
1985	World Race Walking Cup	St John's, Isle of Man	2nd	Team	234 pts
1986	European Championships	Stuttgart, Germany	3rd	50 km walk	3:42.38
1987	World Race Walking Cup	New York City, New York	5th	50 km walk	3:45:09
1987	World Race Walking Cup	New York City, New York	1st	Team	607 pts
1987	World Championships	Rome, Italy	—	50 km walk	DQ

== National titles ==
- Soviet Athletics Championships
  - 50 km walk: 1986

== See also ==
- List of European Athletics Championships medalists (men)
