= Willi Sawall =

Australian race walker

Willi Alfred Sawall (born 7 November 1941) is a retired male race walker from Australia. He set his personal best (3:46.34) in the men's 50 km in 1980. Sawall is a seven-time national champion in race walking.

== Achievements ==
Year	Competition	Venue	Position	Event	Notes
Representing Australia
1978	Commonwealth Games	Edmonton, Canada	2nd	30 km	
1979	World Race Walking Cup	Eschborn, West Germany	10th	50 km	
1980	Olympic Games	Moscow, Soviet Union	8th	50 km	
1981	World Race Walking Cup	Valencia, Spain	—	50 km	DNF
1983	World Championships	Helsinki, Finland	30th	20 km	
1984	Olympic Games	Los Angeles, California, United States	16th	20 km	
1985	World Race Walking Cup	St John's, Isle of Man	11th	50 km	
1987	World Championships	Rome, Italy	26th	50 km	
