= Monica Gunnarsson =

Swedish racewalker

Monica Gunnarsson (born 22 April 1965) is a Swedish female former racewalking athlete. She was a seven-time participant at the IAAF World Race Walking Cup, racing at every edition from 1983 to 1995. Her best finish at the competition was 14th, achieved in 1991. She also represented her country at the 1987 World Championships in Athletics, where she was sixth overall, and was eighth at the European Athletics Championships in 1986 and 1990. She was a bronze medallist at the 1987 European Athletics Indoor Championships.

Gunnarsson won four times in the Swedish 10 km race walk championships and three time at the Swedish Athletics Championships over 5000 metres race walk. She won four national titles in the 3000 metres race walk at the Swedish Indoor Championships. At regional level at the Nordic Race Walking Championships, she was the junior 5 km champion in 1983 and went on to win minor medals as a senior in 1985 and 1987.

== International competitions ==
| Year | Competition | Venue | Position | Event | Notes |
|---|---|---|---|---|---|
| 1983 | World Race Walking Cup | Bergen, Norway | 32nd | 10 km walk | 50:32 |
| 1983 | Nordic Race Walking Championships | Copenhagen, Denmark | 1st | Junior 5 km | 24:14 |
| 1985 | World Race Walking Cup | St. John's, Isle of Man | 15th | 10 km walk | 48:20 |
| 1985 | Nordic Race Walking Championships | Pori, Finland | 2nd | 5000 m walk | 22:57.5 |
| 1986 | European Championships | Stuttgart, West Germany | 8th | 10 km walk | 47.24 |
| 1987 | European Indoor Championships | Liévin, France | 3rd | 3000 m walk | 13:06.46 |
| 1987 | Nordic Race Walking Championships | Gimo, Sweden | 3rd | 5 km walk | 22:44 |
| 1987 | World Race Walking Cup | New York City, United States | 18th | 10 km walk | 46:38 |
| 1987 | World Championships | Rome, Italy | 6th | 10 km walk | 45:09 |
| 1989 | European Indoor Championships | The Hague, Netherlands | 8th | 3000 m walk | 12:54.52 |
| 1989 | World Race Walking Cup | Barcelona, Spain | 13th | 10 km walk | 45:59 |
| 1990 | European Championships | Split, Yugoslavia | 8th | 10 km walk | 45.48 |
| 1991 | World Race Walking Cup | San Jose, United States | 14th | 10 km walk | 46:08 |
| 1993 | World Race Walking Cup | Monterrey, Mexico | — | 10 km walk | DNF |
| 1995 | World Race Walking Cup | Beijing, China | 73rd | 10 km walk | 49:38 |

== National titles ==
- Swedish Athletics Championships
  - 5000 m walk: 1988, 1989, 1990
  - 10 km walk: 1988, 1989, 1990, 1993
- Swedish Indoor Championships
  - 3000 m walk: 1987, 1988, 1989, 1994

== See also ==
- List of European Athletics Indoor Championships medalists (women)
