= Giacomo Poggi =

Italian male retired racewalker (born 1960)

Personal information
- Nationality: Italian
- Born: 30 July 1960 (age 65)

Sport
- Country: Italy
- Sport: Athletics
- Event: Racewalking
- Club: ASSI Giglio Rosso

Achievements and titles
- Personal best: 50 km: 3:52:33 (1987)
Medal record
Universiade
Silver medal – second place	1987 Zagreb	20 km walk
World Race Walking Cup
Gold medal – first place	1981 Valencia	Combined Team
Silver medal – second place	1983 Bergen	Combined Team
Silver medal – second place	1987 New York City	Combined Team

Giacomo Poggi (born 30 July 1960) is an Italian male retired racewalker, who participated at the 1987 World Championships in Athletics.

== Achievements ==
Year	Competition	Venue	Position	Event	Performance	Notes
1987	World Championships	(Italy) Rome	DQ	50 km walk	3:03.91	

== See also ==
- Italian team at the running events
- Italy at the IAAF World Race Walking Cup
