= Jorge Llopart =

Spanish racewalker (1952–2020)

Jordi Llopart Ribas
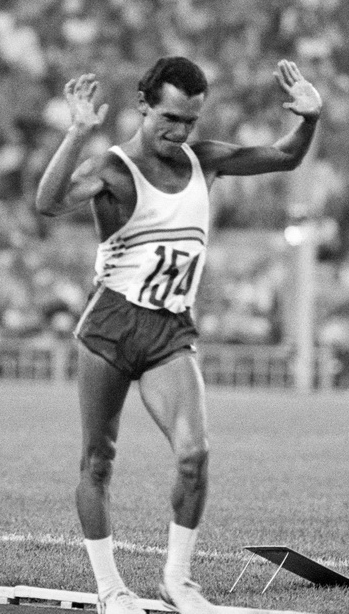
- Llopart at the 1980 Olympics

Personal information
- Born: 5 May 1952 El Prat de Llobregat, Spain
- Died: 11 November 2020 (aged 68) Badalona, Spain
- Height: 167 cm (5 ft 6 in)
- Weight: 63 kg (139 lb)

Sport
- Country: Spain
- Sport: Athletics
- Event: Race walking
- Club: GCR La Seda

Achievements and titles
- Personal best: 50 kmW – 3:44:33 (1989)
Medal record
Men's athletics
Representing Spain
Olympic Games
| Silver medal – second place | 1980 Moscow | 50 km walk |
European Championships
| Gold medal – first place | 1978 Prague | 50 km walk |

Jorge "Jordi" Llopart Ribas (5 May 1952 – 11 November 2020) was a Spanish race walker.

He competed in the 50 km event at the 1980, 1984, and 1988 Olympics and won a silver medal in 1980. The silver medal was Spain's first ever medal in athletics. Llopart was a European champion in this event in 1978.

== Achievements ==
| Year | Competition | Venue | Position | Event | Notes |
Representing Spain
| 1978 | European Championships | Prague, Czechoslovakia | 1st | 50 km | 3:53:29.9 |
| 1980 | Olympic Games | Moscow, Soviet Union | 2nd | 50 km | 3:51:25 |
| 1982 | European Championships | Athens, Greece | 6th | 50 km | 4:08:28 |
| 1983 | World Race Walking Cup | Bergen, Norway | 4th | 50 km | 3:52:57 |
| 1983 | World Championships | Helsinki, Finland | 28th | 20 km | 1:27:49 |
| 1983 | World Championships | Helsinki, Finland | — | 50 km | DNF |
| 1984 | Olympic Games | Los Angeles, United States | 7th | 50 km | 4:03:09 |
| 1985 | World Race Walking Cup | St John's, Isle of Man | 8th | 50 km | 4:02:55 |
| 1986 | European Championships | Stuttgart, West Germany | 9th | 50 km | 3:52:12 |
| 1987 | World Race Walking Cup | New York City, United States | 14th | 50 km | 3:55:35 |
| 1987 | World Championships | Rome, Italy | — | 50 km | DQ |
| 1988 | Olympic Games | Seoul, South Korea | 13th | 50 km | 3:48:09 |
| 1990 | European Championships | Split, Yugoslavia | — | 50 km | DNF |
| 1991 | World Championships | Tokyo, Japan | 17th | 50 km | 4:16:36 |
