= Aleksandra Grigoryeva =

Soviet racewalker

Personal information
- Born: 19 March 1960 (age 66)

Sport
- Country: Soviet Union
Medal record
Universiade
Gold medal – first place	1985 Kobe	5000 m walk
IAAF World Race Walking Cup
Silver medal – second place	1981 Valencia	5 km walk
Bronze medal – third place	1985 St John's	10 km walk

Aleksandra Grigoryeva (née Deverinskaya; Russian: Александра Деверинская-Григорьева; born 19 March 1960) is a Russian former racewalking athlete. She was the gold medallist at the 1985 Summer Universiade, becoming the inaugural women's walk champion at the event. She represented the Soviet Union at the 1986 European Athletics Championships.

She was twice a medallist at the IAAF World Race Walking Cup, taking silver in 1981 and sharing the bronze with teammate Olga Krishtop in 1985. She was also a bronze medallist at the 1986 Goodwill Games. She won at the Soviet Athletics Championships in 1981, taking the 5000 m walk title.

She is a former world record holder for the 5000 metres race walk, having set a time of 22:30.0 minutes in Moscow on 2 May 1982.

== International competitions ==
Year	Competition	Venue	Position	Event	Notes
1981	IAAF World Race Walking Cup	Valencia, Spain	2nd	5 km walk	23:17.2
1985	IAAF World Race Walking Cup	St John's, Isle of Man	3rd	10 km walk	46:24
1985	Universiade	Kobe, Japan	1st	5000 m walk	22:21.10
1986	European Championships	Stuttgart, West Germany	7th	10 km walk	47:16
1986	Goodwill Games	Moscow, Soviet Union	3rd	10,000 m walk	46:00.27

== National titles ==
- Soviet Athletics Championships
  - 5000 m walk: 1981
