= Arturo Bravo =

Mexican race walker (born 1958)

Personal information
- Full name: Arturo Bravo Sobrino
- Born: 19 May 1958 (age 68)
- Height: 1.74 m (5 ft 9 in)
- Weight: 64 kg (141 lb)

Sport
- Country: Mexico
- Sport: Athletics
- Event: Race walking
- Updated on 30 July 2013

Arturo Bravo Sobrino (born 19 May 1958) is a Mexican retired race walker. He represented his native country at the 1988 Summer Olympics in Seoul, South Korea. He set his personal best (3:52:08) in the men's 50 km walk event in 1987.

His international career stretched through the 1980s, beginning with a fifth-place finish in the 50 km walk at the 1981 IAAF World Race Walking Cup. He won the gold medal in the event at the 1983 CAC Championships. He made his major appearances at the 1987 World Championships in Athletics (finishing eighth) and at the Seoul Olympics (ranking 33rd overall).

== Personal bests ==
- 50 km: 3:52:08 hrs – Rome, Italy, 5 September 1987

== Achievements ==
Year	Competition	Venue	Position	Event	Notes
Representing Mexico
1981	World Race Walking Cup	Valencia, Spain	5th	50 km	3:58:04
1983	World Race Walking Cup	Bergen, Norway	28th	50 km	4:18:03
1983	Central American and Caribbean Championships	Havana, Cuba	1st	50 km	4:21:01
1987	World Race Walking Cup	New York City, United States	—	50 km	DSQ
1987	World Championships	Rome, Italy	8th	50 km	3:52:08
1988	Olympic Games	Seoul, South Korea	33rd	50 km	4:08:08
1988	Pan American Race Walking Cup	Mar del Plata, Argentina	2nd	50 km	4:06:55
1990	Pan American Race Walking Cup	Xalapa, Mexico	—	50 km	DQ
