= Stanisław Rola =

Polish racewalker

Stanisław Rola (born 28 January 1957) is a retired male race walker from Poland, who represented his native country at the 1980 Summer Olympics in Moscow. There he ended up in seventh place in the men's 50 km race, clocking 4:07.07. He was born in Warsaw.
