= Jim Heiring =

American racewalker

James Anthony Heiring (born November 4, 1955) is a retired male race walker from the United States, who competed in two consecutive Summer Olympics during his career, starting in 1984.

== Achievements ==
Year	Competition	Venue	Position	Event	Notes
Representing the United States
1983	World Race Walking Cup	Bergen, Norway	16th	20 km	
1983	Pan American Games	Caracas, Venezuela	6th	20 km	
1983	World Championships	Helsinki, Finland	19th	20 km	
1983	World Championships	Helsinki, Finland	DNF	50 km	
1984	Olympic Games	Los Angeles, California, United States	23rd	20 km	
1985	World Indoor Games	Paris, France	6th	5000 m	
1988	Olympic Games	Seoul, South Korea	38th	20 km	
