= Jin Bingjie =

Chinese racewalker (born 1971)

Jin Bingjie (金 冰洁 - Jīn Bīngjié; born 1 April 1971 in Liaoning) is a retired Chinese race walker.

She won the bronze medal in the 5000 m walk at the 1986 World Junior Championships in Athletics then took third a year later in the 10 km race at the 1987 IAAF World Race Walking Cup. She came seventh in the latter event at the 1987 World Championships in Athletics and was the silver medallist in at the 1990 Asian Games.

In 1990 she set an Asian record and world junior record of 20:37.7 minutes for the 5000 km track walk. This stood as the best Asian mark over twenty years, finally being beaten by Liu Hong.

== Achievements ==
Year	Competition	Venue	Position	Event	Notes
Representing China
1986	World Junior Championships	Athens, Greece	3rd	5000 m	22:17.83
1987	World Race Walking Cup	New York City, United States	3rd	10 km	43:45
1987	World Championships	Rome, Italy	7th	10 km	45:24
1990	Asian Games	Beijing, China	2nd	10 km	46:57
1990	World Junior Championships	Plovdiv, Bulgaria	—	5000m	DQ
