= Vince O'Sullivan =

American racewalker (born 1957)

Vincent John O'Sullivan (born February 23, 1957, in London, Greater London) is a retired male racewalker from the United States, who competed at the 1984 Summer Olympics for Team USA. He was fifth at the 1979 Pan American Games and also took part in the IAAF World Race Walking Cup.

== Achievements ==
Year	Competition	Venue	Position	Event	Notes
Representing the United States
1979	Pan American Games	San Juan, Puerto Rico	5th	50 km	4:44:20
1984	Olympic Games	Los Angeles, United States	14th	50 km	4:22:51
