= Andrés Marín =

Spanish tenor

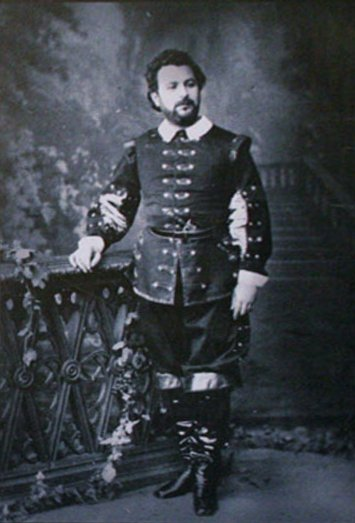
Andrés Marín

Andrés Marín (February 4, 1843 - July 27, 1896) was a Spanish tenor. He belonged to the choir of the Teatro Real, which debuted in 1866.
