= Xu Yongjiu =

Chinese racewalker (born 1964)

Personal information
- Born: 29 October 1964 (age 61) Liaoning, China

Sport
- Sport: Race walking
Medal record
Representing China
IAAF World Race Walking Cup
Gold medal – first place	1983 Bergen	10 km walk
Asian Games
Silver medal – second place	1986 Seoul	10 km walk

Xu Yongjiu (Chinese: 徐永久; born 29 October 1964) is a Chinese former racewalking athlete. She was Asia's first world champion in the sport.

From the Chinese province of Liaoning, Xu trained at the Hebei Xinglong National Athletic Training Base.

She had the greatest season of her career in 1983. On her international debut at the 1983 IAAF World Race Walking Cup she came away with the gold medal, also leading China's women to a team victory. This made her Asia's first ever world champion in racewalking. Her winning time of 45:14 minutes was the fastest for the 10 kilometres race walk that year. She claimed the first ever women's walk title at the National Games of China later that year, beating all national opposition in 49:04 minutes.

Xu attempted a title defence at the 1985 IAAF World Race Walking Cup, but lost out in a close affair in fifth place, ten seconds behind the winner. She was again part of the gold medal-winning team as the Chinese women were led by the top two finishers Yan Hong and Guan Ping. In terms of time she ranked third globally that year, with 44:45 minutes, behind only her countrywomen Yan and Guan. A women's walking event was added for the first time to the continental programme at the 1986 Asian Games and the Chinese women were dominant, with Guan winning the race and Xu in second place ten seconds in arrears.

Her final appearance at global level came at the 1987 IAAF World Race Walking Cup, but this was among the worst results for her country at the competition, as the trio of Xu, Yan and Guan were all disqualified for foot lifting, leaving the national team down in an historic low of ninth place.

After her retirement she remarked upon the extreme pressures she had gone through to reach the heights of the sport: "Several times I fainted on the training grounds. I will never forget that moment so painful that one can no longer feel pain." Academic Susan Brownell placed Xu's suffering within a wider context of the theme of self-sacrifice in Chinese women's sports.

== International competitions ==
Year	Competition	Venue	Position	Event	Notes
1983	World Race Walking Cup	Bergen, Norway	1st	10 km walk	45:14
1983	World Race Walking Cup	Bergen, Norway	1st	Team	132 pts
1985	World Race Walking Cup	St. John's, Isle of Man	5th	10 km walk	46:32
1985	World Race Walking Cup	St. John's, Isle of Man	1st	Team	104 pts
1986	Asian Games	Seoul, South Korea	2nd	10 km walk	49:50
1987	World Race Walking Cup	New York City, United States	—	10 km walk	DQ
