= Viktor Mostovik =

Moldovan racewalker

Personal information
- Born: 7 January 1963
- Died: 12 December 2010 (aged 47)

Sport
- Sport: Race walking
Medal record
Representing Soviet Union
Summer Universiade
Gold medal – first place	1985 Kobe	20km walk

Viktor Mostovik (7 January 1963 – 12 December 2010) is a retired Moldovan race walker. He won his first medal, a bronze, at the 1981 European Athletics Junior Championships.

== Career ==
He finished fourth at the 1986 European Championships and the 1987 World Championships, representing the Soviet Union, and twelfth at the 1993 World Championships. He also finished third at the 1985 World Race Walking Cup and second at the 1987 World Race Walking Cup.

== International competitions ==
Year	Competition	Venue	Position	Notes
Representing Soviet Union
1981	European Junior Championships	Utrecht, Netherlands	3rd	10,000 m walk
1985	World Race Walking Cup	St John's, United Kingdom	3rd	20 km
1985	Universiade	Kobe, Japan	1st	20 km walk
1987	World Race Walking Cup	New York City, United States	2nd	20 km
1989	World Race Walking Cup	L'Hospitalet, Spain	5th	20 km
