= Zhang Fuxin =

Chinese racewalker

Zhang Fuxin (Chinese: 張阜新; born September 1, 1961) is a retired male racewalker from PR China, who competed at the 1984 Summer Olympics for his native country.

== Achievements ==
| Year | Competition | Venue | Position | Event | Notes |
Representing China
| 1982 | Asian Games | New Delhi, India | 3rd | 20 km | 1:33:34 |
| 1983 | World Race Walking Cup | Bergen, Norway | 17th | 20 km | 1:25:23 |
| 1983 | World Championships | Helsinki, Finland | 25th | 50 km | 4:35:46 |
| 1984 | Olympic Games | Los Angeles, United States | 27th | 20 km | 1:32:10 |
| 1984 | Olympic Games | Los Angeles, United States | 15th | 50 km | 4:23:39 |
