= Irina Strakhova =

Irina Borisovna Strakhova (Russian: Ирина Борисовна Страхова); born 4 March 1959 in Novosibirsk) is a race walker who represented the Soviet Union.

== Education ==
In 1981 she graduated from the Novosibirsk State University with a degree in Economic Cybernetics.

== Achievements ==
Year	Competition	Venue	Position	Notes
Representing Soviet Union
1987	World Championships	Rome, Italy	1st	10 km
1987	World Race Walking Cup	New York City, United States	2nd	10 km
1991	World Championships	Tokyo, Japan	4th	10 km
1991	World Race Walking Cup	San Jose, United States	1st	10 km
