= Bengt Simonsen (race walker) =

Swedish racewalker

Bengt Roland Simonsen (born 23 March 1958 in Gothenburg, Västra Götaland) is a retired male racewalker from Sweden, who competed in three consecutive Summer Olympics for his native country, starting in 1976.

== International competitions ==
Representing Sweden
Year	Competition	Venue	Position	Event	Result	Notes
1976	Olympic Games	Montreal, Canada	26th	20 km	1:35:31.8	
1980	Olympic Games	Moscow, Soviet Union	4th	50 km	3:57:08	
1983	World Championships	Helsinki, Finland	10th	50 km	3:57:25	
1984	Olympic Games	Los Angeles, United States	—	50 km	—	DQ
