= Roland Nilsson (race walker) =

Swedish racewalker (born 1948)

Personal information
- Nationality: Swedish
- Born: 13 September 1948 (age 77)

Sport
- Sport: Athletics
- Event: Racewalking

Roland Nilsson (born 13 September 1948) is a Swedish racewalker. He competed in the men's 50 kilometres walk at the 1984 Summer Olympics.
