= Olga Krishtop =

Olga Krishtop (Russian: Ольга Криштоп; born 8 October 1957) is a race walker who represented the Soviet Union and later Russia.

== Achievements ==
Year	Competition	Venue	Position	Notes
Representing Soviet Union
1985	World Race Walking Cup	St John's, Isle of Man	3rd	10 km
1987	World Indoor Championships	Indianapolis, United States	1st	3000 m
1987	World Race Walking Cup	New York City, United States	1st	10 km
1987	World Championships	Rome, Italy	DSQ	10 km

Records
Preceded by Young Juxu; Yan Hong	Women's 10 km Walk World Record Holder; August 5, 1984 – March 16, 1985; May 3, 1987 – May 4, 1987	Succeeded by Yan Hong; Kerry Saxby
