= Gérard Lelièvre =

French racewalker

Medal record

Men's athletics

Representing France

European Indoor Championships
| Bronze medal – third place | 1981 Grenoble | 5000 m walk |

Gérard Lelièvre (born 13 November 1949 in Laval, Mayenne) is a retired male race walker from France, who competed in three consecutive Summer Olympics during his career, starting in 1976.

== International competitions ==
Representing France
| Year | Competition | Venue | Position | Event | Notes |
|---|---|---|---|---|---|
| 1976 | Olympic Games | Montreal, Canada | 9th | 20 km | |
| 1980 | Olympic Games | Moscow, Soviet Union | — | 50 km | DNF |
| 1982 | European Championships | Athens, Greece | 4th | 20 km | |
| 1983 | World Race Walking Cup | Bergen, Norway | 5th | 50 km | |
| 1983 | World Championships | Helsinki, Finland | 5th | 20 km | |
| 1984 | Olympic Games | Los Angeles, United States | 15th | 20 km | |
| 1984 | Olympic Games | Los Angeles, United States | — | 50 km | DNF |
| 1985 | World Indoor Games | Paris, France | 1st | 5 km | |
