= Alessandro Pezzatini =

Italian racewalker

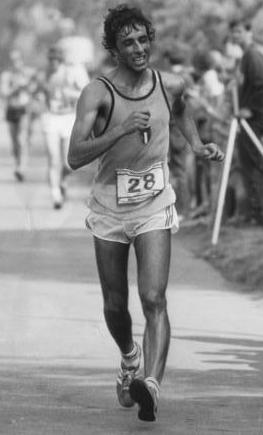

Personal information
- Nationality: Italian
- Born: 25 August 1957 (age 68) Fiesole, Italy
- Height: 1.79 m (5 ft 10 1/2 in)
- Weight: 65 kg (143 lb)

Sport
- Country: Italy
- Sport: Athletics
- Event: Racewalking
- Club: ASSI Giglio Rosso; G.S. Fiamme Gialle

Achievements and titles
- Personal best: 20 km walk: 1:20.18 (1984)
Medal record
World Race Walking Cup
Bronze medal – third place	1981 Valencia	20 km walk

Alessandro Pezzatini (born 25 August 1957 in Fiesole, Province of Florence) is a retired male race walker from Italy.

== Biography ==
He set his personal best on the 20 km walk in 1984 with a time of 1:20.18 (the time is still the best performance Italian 7th all-time), obtaining the qualification for the Olympic Games in Los Angeles where, however, he could not repeat that time and was ranked 28th with a time of 12.1 minutes over that.

== Achievements ==
Year	Competition	Venue	Position	Event	Time	Notes
1981	World Race Walking Cup	(Spain) Valencia	3rd	20 km		
1982	European Championships	(Greece) Athens	5th	20 km		
1983	World Championships	(Finland) Helsinki	24th	20 km		
1984	Olympic Games	(United States) Los Angeles	28th	20 km		
1985	World Race Walking Cup	(Isle of Man) St John's	15th	20 km		

== See also ==
- Italian all-time lists - 20 km walk
