= Dominique Guebey =

French racewalker

Dominique Guebey (born 23 May 1952 in Lyon, Rhône) is a French racewalker who competed at the 1984 Summer Olympics. He was also a two-time 50 km French champion (1978 and 1984). Between 1973 and 1987 Guebey earned 25 medals at the French championships (5 km indoor, 20 km, 50 km). He retired from international competition in 1989.

== Achievements ==
Year	Competition	Venue	Position	Event	Notes
Representing France
1978	European Championships	Prague, Czechoslovakia	18th	50 km	4:09:57
1983	World Championships	Helsinki, Finland	22nd	50 km	4:09:40
1984	Olympic Games	Los Angeles, United States	12th	50 km	4:13:34
1987	World Championships	Rome, Italy	14th	20 km	1:25:01
