= Philip Vesty =

British racewalker (born 1963)

Personal information
- Nationality: British
- Born: 5 January 1963 (age 63) Oadby, Great Britain

Sport
- Sport: Athletics
- Event: Racewalking

Philip John Vesty (born 5 January 1963) is a British racewalker. He competed in the men's 20 kilometres walk at the 1984 Summer Olympics.
