= Paul Blagg =

English racewalker (born 1960)

Personal information
- Nationality: British (English)
- Born: 23 January 1960 (age 66) Guildford, England
- Height: 181 cm (5 ft 11 in)
- Weight: 72 kg (159 lb)

Sport
- Sport: Athletics
- Event: Race walk
- Club: Cambridge Harriers, Bexleyheath

Paul Blagg (born 23 January 1960) is a retired male race walker from England who competed at the 1988 Summer Olympics and 1992 Summer Olympics.*

== Biography ==
Blagg represented England in the 30 kilometres walk event, at the 1982 Commonwealth Games in Brisbane, Australia.

Blagg finished third behind Ian McCombie in the 10,000 metres walk event at the 1986 AAA Championships and would reach the podium of the AAASs on three more occasions in 1988, 1989 and 1991.

He set his personal best (3:59.55) in the 50 km race in 1987 and at the 1988 Olympic Games in Seoul, he represented Great Britain in the 50km walk. A second appearance for Great Britain at the 1992 Olympic Games in Barcelona ensued.

Blagg is now a successful trainer and rider in point to point horse races.

== International competitions ==
Year	Competition	Venue	Position	Event	Notes
Representing the United Kingdom and England
1987	World Championships	Rome, Italy	19th	50 km	3:59:55
1988	Olympic Games	Seoul, South Korea	28th	50 km	4:00:07
1990	European Championships	Split, Yugoslavia	—	50 km	DNF
1991	World Championships	Tokyo, Japan	22nd	50 km	4:35:22
1992	Olympic Games	Barcelona, Spain	30th	50 km	4:23:10
