= Manuel Alcalde =

Spanish racewalker

Manuel Alcalde Fornieles (December 31, 1956 – April 23, 2004) was a male race walker from Spain. He represented his native country twice at the Olympic Games: 1984 and 1988. He was born and died in Guadix, Granada.

== Achievements ==
Year	Competition	Venue	Position	Event	Notes
Representing Spain
1983	World Race Walking Cup	Bergen, Norway	10th	50 km	
1983	World Championships	Helsinki, Finland	15th	50 km	
1984	Olympic Games	Los Angeles, United States	9th	50 km	
1985	World Race Walking Cup	St John's, Isle of Man	9th	50 km	
1986	European Championships	Stuttgart, West Germany	—	50 km	DNF
1987	World Championships	Rome, Italy	—	50 km	DNF
1988	Olympic Games	Seoul, South Korea	25th	50 km	
1989	World Race Walking Cup	L'Hospitalet, Spain	20th	50 km	
