= Bo Gustafsson =

Swedish racewalker (born 1954)

Personal information
- Full name: Bo Henning Gustafsson
- Nationality: Swedish
- Born: 29 September 1954 (age 71) Strömstad, Västra Götaland County, Sweden

Sport
- Sport: Athletics
- Event: Racewalking
Medal record
Men's athletics
Representing Sweden
European Championships
Bronze medal – third place	1982 Athens	50 km walk

Bo Henning Gustafsson (born 29 September 1954) is a former Swedish athlete who mainly competed in the men's 50 kilometre walk during his career.

== Biography ==
He competed for Sweden at the 1984 Summer Olympics held in Los Angeles, California, where he won the silver medal in the men's 50 kilometre walk event. Gustafsson was a Latter-day Saint. He was a convert to the Church of Jesus Christ of Latter-day Saints who had joined before he competed in the Olympics.

== Personal life ==
Gustafsson was born in Strömstad, Sweden to Henning and Klara Gustafsson. He was married to Lis Herrey and they had four sons and one daughter together. Son Andreas Gustafsson, who Bo coaches, is also a Swedish Olympic racewalker, later changing allegiance to USA.

From 1996 he is the companion of the Italian racewalker, several times medal at World Athletics Championships and European Athletics Championships, Ileana Salvador. The couple has two daughters, Nicole (born 1995) and Noelle (born 1998) who is a model and in 2019 she participated in the selections for the Miss Italia contest.

== Business career ==
Bo Gustafsson is currently the owner of Restaurang Storseglet based in Gothenburg, Sweden. He previously founded several companies and has been the manager of many artists, including the Herreys.

== Achievements ==
Year	Competition	Venue	Position	Event	Notes
Representing Sweden
1978	European Championships	Prague, Czechoslovakia	10th	20 km	1:26:13.5
1980	Olympic Games	Moscow, Soviet Union	—	20 km	DSQ
1980	Olympic Games	Moscow, Soviet Union	—	50 km	DNF
1982	European Championships	Athens, Greece	—	20 km	DQ
1982	European Championships	Athens, Greece	3rd	50 km	4:01:21
1984	Olympic Games	Los Angeles, United States	2nd	50 km	3:53:19
1986	European Championships	Stuttgart, West Germany	7th	50 km	3:50:13
1987	World Championships	Rome, Italy	—	50 km	DSQ
1988	Olympic Games	Seoul, South Korea	7th	50 km	3:44:49
1990	European Championships	Split, Yugoslavia	—	50 km	DQ
