= Zdzisław Szlapkin =

Polish racewalker

Zdzisław Szlapkin (born 18 January 1961 in Chodzież, Wielkopolskie) is a male former racewalker from Poland, who represented his native country at the 1988 Summer Olympics in Seoul, South Korea. He set his personal best (1:20.52) in the men's 20 km walk event in 1988.

== Achievements ==
Year	Competition	Venue	Position	Event	Notes
Representing Poland
1988	Olympic Games	Seoul, South Korea	36th	20 km	1:27:23
