= Raúl González (race walker) =

Mexican race walker

Personal information
- Full name: Raúl González Rodríguez
- Born: February 29, 1952 (age 74) China, Nuevo León, Mexico
- Height: 1.75 m (5 ft 9 in)
- Weight: 64 kg (141 lb)

Sport
- Sport: Athletics
- Event: Race walking
Medal record
Men's athletics
Representing Mexico
Olympic Games
Gold medal – first place	1984 Los Angeles	50 km walk
Silver medal – second place	1984 Los Angeles	20 km walk
World Race Walking Cup
Gold medal – first place	1977 Milton Keynes	50 km walk
Gold medal – first place	1981 Valencia	50 km walk
Gold medal – first place	1983 Bergen	50 km walk
Pan American Games
Gold medal – first place	1979 San Juan	50 km walk
Gold medal – first place	1983 Caracas	50 km walk
Silver medal – second place	1983 Caracas	20 km walk
Silver medal – second place	1987 Indianapolis	50 km walk

Raúl González Rodríguez (born February 29, 1952) is a Mexican former race walker.

== Career ==
González won the gold medal in 50 km walk at the 1984 Olympics in Los Angeles. He also won a silver medal in 20 km walk. He set an Olympic record winning the 50 km event in a time of 3:47:26.

González won the 50 km race walk at the IAAF World Race Walking Cup in 1977, 1981 and 1983.

He set the world record in the 50 km race walk twice in 1978 with times of 3:45:52 and 3:41:20. As of October 2011, it still was the North American record.

== Post-career ==
González was a member of the national race walk team that received Mexico's National Sports Prize in 1977; he received the prize individually in 1978. From 1988 to 1994 he was Director of National Sports Commission of Mexico, and from 2002 to 2004 executive president of the Mexican Professional Baseball League.

== Achievements ==
Year	Competition	Venue	Position	Notes
Representing Mexico
1971	Central American and Caribbean Championships in Athletics	Kingston, Jamaica	3rd	10 km
1974	Central American and Caribbean Games	Santo Domingo, Dominican Republic	1st	20 km
1977	World Race Walking Cup	Milton Keynes, United Kingdom	1st	50 km
1978	Central American and Caribbean Games	Medellín, Colombia	2nd	20 km
1978		Mexico City, Mexico	World record	50 km
1978		Poděbrady, Czechoslovakia	World record	50 km
1979	Pan American Games	San Juan, Puerto Rico	1st	50 km
1980	Olympic Games	Moscow, Soviet Union	6th	20 km
1980	Olympic Games	Moscow, Soviet Union	DNF	50 km
1981	World Race Walking Cup	Valencia, Spain	1st	50 km
1981	Central American and Caribbean Championships in Athletics	Santo Domingo, Dominican Republic	2nd	20 km
1982	Central American and Caribbean Games	Havana, Cuba	2nd	20 km
1982	Central American and Caribbean Games	Havana, Cuba	1st	50 km
1983	World Race Walking Cup	Bergen, Norway	1st	50 km
1983	Pan American Games	Caracas, Venezuela	2nd	20 km
1983	Pan American Games	Caracas, Venezuela	1st	50 km
1983	World Championships in Athletics	Helsinki, Finland	9th	20 km
1983	World Championships in Athletics	Helsinki, Finland	5th	50 km
1984	Olympic Games	Los Angeles, United States	2nd	20 km
1984	Olympic Games	Los Angeles, United States	1st	50 km
1987	Pan American Games	Indianapolis, United States	2nd	50 km
1987	World Championships in Athletics	Rome, Italy	11th	50 km

Records
Preceded by (East Germany) Bernd Kannenberg	Men's 50 km Walk World Record Holder; April 23, 1978 – March 13, 1983	Succeeded by (Spain) Josep Marín
