= Sandro Bellucci =

Italian race walker

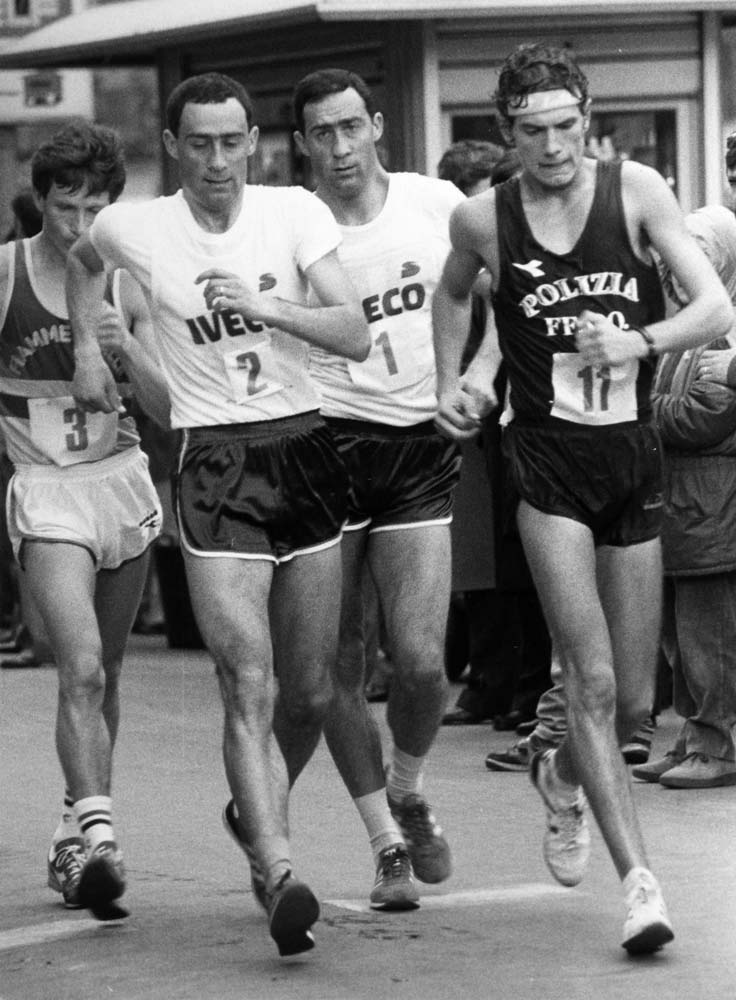
- Bellucci (#3), first from left

Personal information
- Full name: Alessandro Bellucci
- Born: 21 February 1955 (age 71) Lanuvio, Italy
- Height: 1.70 m (5 ft 7 in)
- Weight: 56 kg (123 lb)

Sport
- Country: Italy
- Sport: Athletics
- Event: Racewalking
- Club: G.S. Fiamme Gialle

Achievements and titles
- Personal best: 50 km walk: 3:48.52 (1987)
Medal record
Summer Olympics
Bronze medal – third place	1984 Los Angeles	50 km walk
World Race Walking Cup
Bronze medal – third place	1981 Valencia	50 km walk

Sandro Bellucci (born 21 February 1955) is an Italian former race walker.

== Biography ==
He won two medals, at senior level, at the International athletics competitions. He participated in two editions of the Summer Olympics (1984 and 1988), and he has 31 caps in the national team from 1974 to 1991.

== Achievements ==
Year	Competition	Venue	Position	Event	Notes
Representing Italy
1978	European Championships	Prague, Czechoslovakia	7th	50 km	3:58:25.9
1981	World Race Walking Cup	Valencia, Spain	3rd	50 km	3:54:57
1982	European Championships	Athens, Greece	—	50 km	DQ
1983	World Championships	Helsinki, Finland	7th	50 km	3:55:38
1984	Olympic Games	Los Angeles, United States	3rd	50 km	3:53:45
1986	European Championships	Stuttgart, West Germany	11th	50 km	3:54:10
1987	World Championships	Rome, Italy	6th	50 km	3:48:52
1988	Olympic Games	Seoul, South Korea	32nd	50 km	4:04:56
1990	European Championships	Split, Yugoslavia	8th	50 km	4:03:46
1991	World Championships	Tokyo, Japan	—	50 km	DNF

== See also ==
- Italian all-time lists - 50 km walk
