= Dietmar Meisch =

East German race walker

Dietmar Meisch (born 10 February 1959 in Weida, Bezirk Gera) is a retired East German race walker.

He won the bronze medal at the 1987 IAAF World Race Walking Cup, finished twentieth at the 1980 Olympic Games and ninth at the 1988 Olympic Games. Meisch represented the sports club TSC Berlin and became East German champion over 50 km in 1987.

== Achievements ==
Year	Competition	Venue	Position	Event	Notes
Representing East Germany
1979	World Race Walking Cup	Eschborn, West Germany	8th	50 km	
1981	World Race Walking Cup	Valencia, Spain	4th	50 km	
1985	World Race Walking Cup	St John's, Isle of Man	6th	50 km	
1987	World Race Walking Cup	New York City, United States	3rd	50 km	
1988	Olympic Games	Seoul, South Korea	9th	50 km	3:46:31
