= José Marín (race walker) =

Spanish racewalker

José Marín Sospedra
Personal information
- Native name: Josep Marín i Sospedra
- Nationality: Spanish
- Born: 21 January 1950 (age 76) El Prat de Llobregat, Spain
- Years active: 1978–1993
- Height: 164 cm (5 ft 5 in)
- Weight: 60 kg (132 lb; 9 st 6 lb)

Sport
- Sport: Racewalking
- Club: CN Barcelona

Achievements and titles
- Highest world ranking: 1st (1982)
Medal record
Men's athletics
Representing Spain
World Championships
Silver medal – second place	1983 Helsinki	50 km walk
Bronze medal – third place	1987 Rome	20 km walk
European Championships
Gold medal – first place	1982 Athens	20 km walk
Silver medal – second place	1982 Athens	50 km walk

José Marín Sospedra (Catalan: Josep Marín i Sospedra; born 21 January 1950) is a retired Spanish racewalker.

== Achievements ==
Year	Competition	Venue	Position	Event	Notes
Representing Spain
1975	Mediterranean Games	Algiers, Algeria	3rd	20 km	1:35:45.7
1978	European Championships	Prague, Czechoslovakia	5th	20 km	1:24:38.1
1978	European Championships	Prague, Czechoslovakia	—	50 km	DNF
1980	Olympic Games	Moscow, Soviet Union	5th	20 km	1:26:45.6
1980	Olympic Games	Moscow, Soviet Union	6th	50 km	4:03:08
1981	World Race Walking Cup	Valencia, Spain	5th	20 km	1:25:00
1982	European Championships	Athens, Greece	1st	20 km	1:23:43
1982	European Championships	Athens, Greece	2nd	50 km	3:59:18
1983	World Championships	Helsinki, Finland	2nd	50 km	3:46:32
1983	World Championships	Helsinki, Finland	4th	20 km	1:21:21
1984	Olympic Games	Los Angeles, United States	6th	20 km	1:25:32
1985	World Race Walking Cup	St John's, Isle of Man	1st	20 km	1:21:42
1986	European Championships	Stuttgart, West Germany	—	20 km	DQ
1987	World Championships	Rome, Italy	3rd	20 km	1:21:24
1988	Olympic Games	Seoul, South Korea	4th	20 km	1:20:34
1988	Olympic Games	Seoul, South Korea	5th	50 km	3:43:03
1989	World Race Walking Cup	L'Hospitalet, Spain	17th	20 km	1:22:52
1990	European Championships	Split, Yugoslavia	5th	50 km	4:02:53
1991	World Race Walking Cup	San Jose, United States	17th	50 km	4:01:02
1991	World Championships	Tokyo, Japan	12th	50 km	4:13:19
1992	Olympic Games	Barcelona, Spain	9th	50 km	3:58:41
1993	World Race Walking Cup	Monterrey, Mexico	16th	50 km	4:04:37

Records
Preceded by (Mexico) Raúl González	Men's 50 km Walk World Record Holder; 13 March 1983 – 20 July 1984	Succeeded by (East Germany) Ronald Weigel
