= Enrique Peña (athlete) =

Colombian racewalker

Personal information
- Nationality: Colombian
- Born: 21 April 1942 (age 84)
- Height: 1.75 m (5 ft 9 in)
- Weight: 72 kg (159 lb)

Sport
- Sport: Athletics
- Event: Racewalking

Enrique Peña (born 21 April 1942) is a Colombian racewalker. He competed in the men's 20 kilometres walk and 50 kilometres walk at the 1980 Summer Olympics.

== Personal bests ==
- 20 kilometres walk – 1:30:03 (1988)
- 50 kilometres walk – 4:29:27 (1980)
