= Erling Andersen (athlete) =

Norwegian racewalker

Personal information
- Born: 22 September 1960 (age 65) Bergen, Norway

Sport
- Sport: Race walking
Medal record
Representing Norway
European Indoor Championships
Bronze medal – third place	1983 Budapest	5000m walk

Erling Andersen (born 22 September 1960) is a retired male race walker from Norway.

== Achievements ==
Year	Competition	Venue	Position	Event	Notes
Representing Norway
1979	European Junior Championships	Bydgoszcz, Poland	2nd	10 km	
1981	World Race Walking Cup	Valencia, Spain	18th	20 km	
1983	European Indoor Championships	Budapest, Hungary	3rd	5000 m	
1983	World Race Walking Cup	Bergen, Norway	15th	20 km	
1983	World Championships	Helsinki, Finland	21st	20 km	
1983	World Championships	Helsinki, Finland	—	50 km	DSQ
1984	Olympic Games	Los Angeles, United States	8th	20 km	
1986	European Championships	Stuttgart, West Germany	10th	50 km	
1987	World Indoor Championships	Indianapolis, United States	9th	5000 m	
1987	European Indoor Championships	Liévin, France	10th	5000 m	
1987	World Race Walking Cup	New York City, United States	12th	20 km	
1987	World Championships	Rome, Italy	15th	20 km	
1987	World Championships	Rome, Italy	12th	50 km	
1988	European Indoor Championships	Budapest, Hungary	4th	5000 m	
1988	Olympic Games	Seoul, South Korea	22nd	20 km	1:23:30
1988	Olympic Games	Seoul, South Korea	—	50 km	DNF
