= Viktor Dorovskikh =

Russian racewalker

Viktor Dorovskikh (Russian: Виктор Доровских; born 19 October 1950) is a race walker who represented the Soviet Union.

== International competitions ==
Year	Competition	Venue	Position	Notes
Representing Soviet Union
1979	World Race Walking Cup	Eschborn, West Germany	3rd	50 km
1983	World Race Walking Cup	Bergen, Norway	3rd	50 km
1983	World Championships	Helsinki, Finland	8th	50 km
1984	Friendship Games	Moscow, Soviet Union	3rd	50 km
