= László Sátor =

Hungarian racewalker

Personal information
- Nationality: Hungarian
- Born: 9 May 1953 (age 73)

Sport
- Sport: Athletics
- Event: Racewalking

László Sátor (born 9 May 1953) is a Hungarian racewalker. He competed in the men's 50 kilometres walk at the 1980 Summer Olympics.
