= Lars Ove Moen =

Norwegian racewalker

Lars Ove Moen (born 15 November 1959) is a retired Norwegian race walker.

He represented Norway during the 1984 Summer Olympics, where we finished at 13th place.

== Achievements ==
Year	Competition	Venue	Position	Event	Notes
Representing Norway
1983	World Championships	Helsinki, Finland	33rd	20 km	
1983	World Championships	Helsinki, Finland	13th	50 km	
1984	Olympic Games	Los Angeles, United States	13th	50 km	
1986	European Championships	Stuttgart, West Germany	16th	50 km	
