= Bohdan Bułakowski =

Polish racewalker (born 1950)

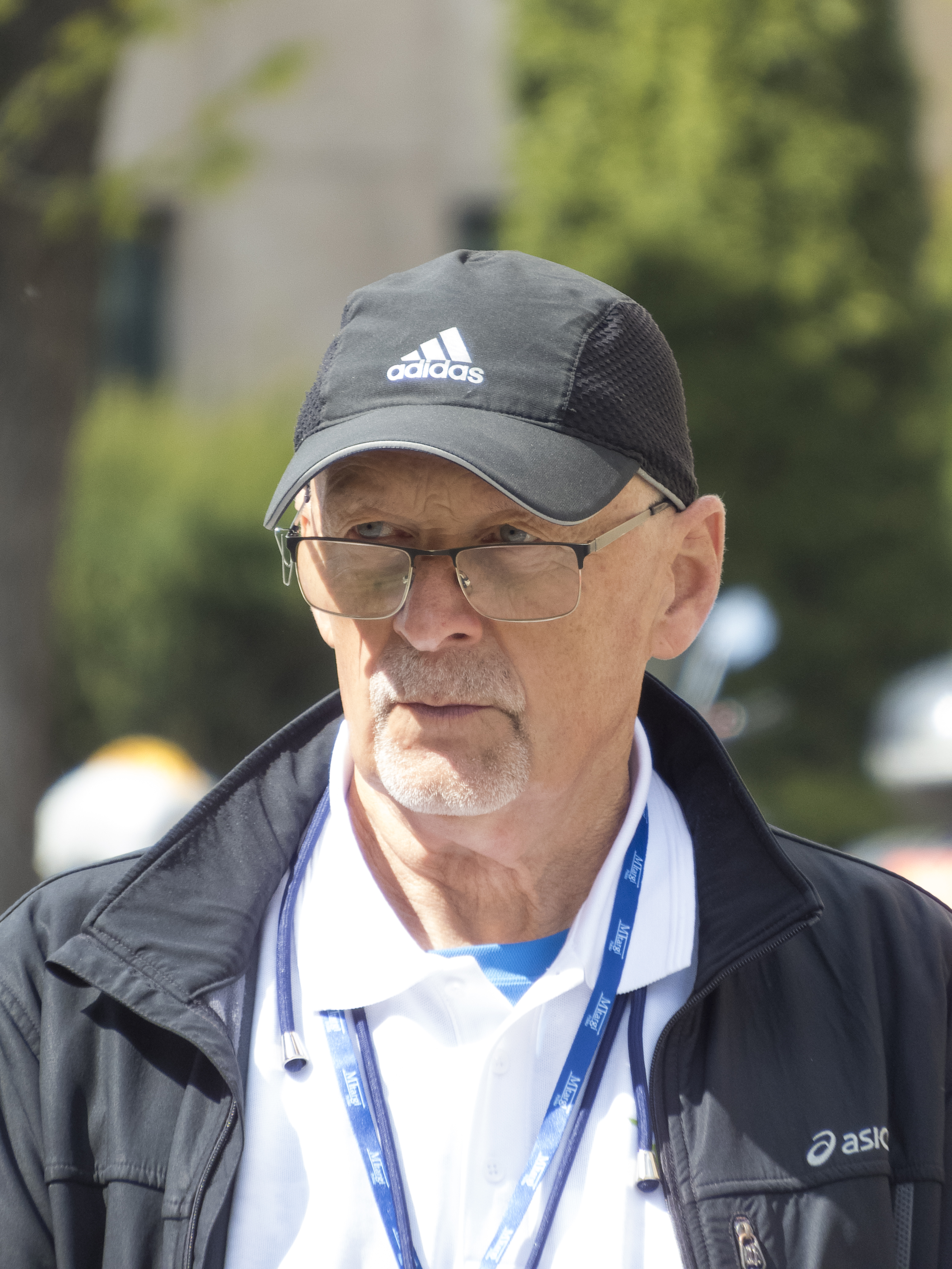
- Bohdan Bułakowski (2026)

Personal information
- Full name: Bohdan Adam Bułakowski
- Born: 11 January 1950 (age 76) Warsaw, Poland
- Height: 181 cm (5 ft 11 in)
- Weight: 67 kg (148 lb)

Bohdan Adam Bułakowski (born 11 January 1950 in Warsaw) is a retired race walker from Poland, who represented his native country at the 1980 Summer Olympics in Moscow. There he ended up in seventh place in the men's 20 km race, clocking 1:28.36.
