= Yan Hong (race walker) =

Chinese race walker (born 1966)

Personal information
- Born: 23 October 1966 (age 59)

Sport
- Sport: Race walking
Medal record
Representing China
World Championships
Bronze medal – third place	1987 Rome	10 km walk
World Indoor Championships
Silver medal – second place	1985 Paris	3000 m
Summer Universiade
Silver medal – second place	1985 Kobe	5 km walk

Yan Hong (阎红, born 23 October 1966) is a Chinese retired race walker.

== International competitions ==
Representing China
Year	Competition	Venue	Position	Notes
1985	World Indoor Championships	Paris, France	2nd	3000 m
1985	World Race Walking Cup	St John's, Isle of Man	1st	10 km
1987	World Championships	Rome, Italy	3rd	10 km
1989	World Race Walking Cup	L'Hospitalet de Llobregat, Spain	20th	10 km

== See also ==
- China at the World Championships in Athletics

Records
Preceded by Olga Krishtop	Women's 10 km Walk World Record Holder; March 16, 1985 – May 3, 1987	Succeeded by Olga Krishtop
