= 1995 IAAF World Race Walking Cup =

- Organisers: IAAF
- Edition: 17th
- Date: April 29–30
- Host city: Beijing, China
- Events: 3
- Participation: 330 athletes from 36 nations

The 1995 IAAF World Race Walking Cup was held on 29 and 30 April 1995 in the streets of Beijing, China. The event was also known as IAAF/Reebok World Race Walking Cup.

Complete results were published.

== Medallists ==
Event	Gold		Silver		Bronze	
Men
Men's 20 km walk	Li Zewen; China	1:19:44	Mikhail Shchennikov; Russia	1:19:58	Bernardo Segura; Mexico	1:20:32
Men's 50 km walk	Zhao Yongsheng; China	3:41:20	Jesús Ángel García; Spain	3:41:54	Valentin Kononen; Finland	3:42:50
Team (Men)
Lugano Cup (Team Men Overall)	Mexico	846 pts	Italy	815 pts	China	805 pts
Team (Men 20 km)	China	436 pts	Italy	422 pts	Mexico	420 pts
Team (Men 50 km)	Mexico	426 pts	Russia	419 pts	Spain	413 pts
Women
Women's 10 km walk	Gao Hongmiao; China	42:19	Yelena Nikolayeva; Russia	42:32	Liu Hongyu; China	42:49
Team (Women)
Eschborn Cup (Women 10 km)	China	443 pts	Italy	429 pts	Russia	424 pts

== Results ==
=== Men's 20 km ===
Place	Athlete	Nation	Time	Notes
1st place, gold medalist(s)	Li Zewen	China (CHN)	1:19:44	
2nd place, silver medalist(s)	Mikhail Shchennikov	Russia (RUS)	1:19:58	
3rd place, bronze medalist(s)	Bernardo Segura	Mexico (MEX)	1:20:32	
4	Yevgeniy Misyulya	Belarus (BLR)	1:20:39	
5	Michele Didoni	Italy (ITA)	1:20:50	
6	Chen Shaoguo	China (CHN)	1:20:57	
7	Thierry Toutain	France (FRA)	1:21:06	
8	Bo Lingtang	China (CHN)	1:21:11	
9	Robert Korzeniowski	Poland (POL)	1:21:28	
10	Li Mingcai	China (CHN)	1:21:41	
11	Daniel García	Mexico (MEX)	1:22:34	
12	Walter Arena	Italy (ITA)	1:22:37	
13	Enrico Lang	Italy (ITA)	1:22:51	
14	Jacek Müller	Poland (POL)	1:23:00	
15	Nicholas A'Hern	Australia (AUS)	1:23:05	
16	Denis Langlois	France (FRA)	1:23:13	
17	Daisuke Ikeshima	Japan (JPN)	1:23:19	
18	Alejandro López	Mexico (MEX)	1:23:32	
19	Igor Kollár	Slovakia (SVK)	1:23:37	
20	Jean-Olivier Brosseau	France (FRA)	1:23:38	
21	Gyula Dudás	Hungary (HUN)	1:23:47	
22	Tsutomu Takushima	Japan (JPN)	1:23:49	
23	Giovanni Perricelli	Italy (ITA)	1:23:54	
24	Cláudio Bertolino	Brazil (BRA)	1:24:14	
25	Mikhail Khmelnitsky	Belarus (BLR)	1:24:15	
26	Yang Jun	China (CHN)	1:24:18	
27	Miguel Solís	Mexico (MEX)	1:24:25	
28	Sergio Galdino	Brazil (BRA)	1:24:41	
29	Darrell Stone	Great Britain (GBR)	1:24:49	
30	Ilya Markov	Russia (RUS)	1:24:52	
31	Martial Fesselier	France (FRA)	1:25:09	
32	Hubert Sonnek	Czech Republic (CZE)	1:25:15	
33	Aleksandar Raković	Yugoslavia (YUG)	1:25:17	
34	Tomáš Kratochvíl	Czech Republic (CZE)	1:25:18	
35	Santiago Pérez	Spain (ESP)	1:25:19	
36	Aigars Fadejevs	Latvia (LAT)	1:25:21	
37	Chris Britz	South Africa (RSA)	1:25:24	
38	Viktoras Meškauskas	Lithuania (LTU)	1:25:46	
39	Pavol Blažek	Slovakia (SVK)	1:25:51	
40	Allen James	United States (USA)	1:25:54	
41	Mariusz Ornoch	Poland (POL)	1:26:10	
42	Stefan Johansson	Sweden (SWE)	1:26:14	
43	Mike Trautmann	Germany (GER)	1:26:43	
44	Artur Meleshkevich	Belarus (BLR)	1:26:53	
45	Stanley Valentine	South Africa (RSA)	1:27:14	
46	Nichan Tsamonikian	Germany (GER)	1:27:14	
47	José Urbano	Portugal (POR)	1:27:21	
48	Shadat Mendoza	Mexico (MEX)	1:27:31	
49	Anatoliy Gorshkov	Ukraine (UKR)	1:27:33	
50	Risto Nurmi	Finland (FIN)	1:27:48	
51	Vladimir Druchik	Ukraine (UKR)	1:28:01	
52	Franz Kostyukevich	Belarus (BLR)	1:28:15	
53	Dion Russell	Australia (AUS)	1:28:25	
54	Magnus Morenius	Sweden (SWE)	1:28:50	
55	Christophe Cousin	France (FRA)	1:29:07	
56	Valdas Kazlauskas	Lithuania (LTU)	1:29:27	
57	Nikolay Kalitka	Ukraine (UKR)	1:29:48	
58	Steve Partington	Great Britain (GBR)	1:30:02	
59	Andreas Erm	Germany (GER)	1:30:22	
60	Valeriy Borisov	Kazakhstan (KAZ)	1:30:49	
61	Rob Cole	United States (USA)	1:30:53	
62	Andrew Hermann	United States (USA)	1:31:00	
63	Jiří Malysa	Czech Republic (CZE)	1:31:08	
64	Pavel Andriyenko	Ukraine (UKR)	1:31:09	
65	Toshihito Fujinohara	Japan (JPN)	1:31:14	
66	João Vieira	Portugal (POR)	1:31:27	
67	Róbert Valíček	Slovakia (SVK)	1:31:30	
68	Saravanin Govindasamy	Malaysia (MAS)	1:31:34	
69	Aigars Saleniks	Latvia (LAT)	1:31:37	
70	Andrew Penn	Great Britain (GBR)	1:31:46	
71	Craig Barrett	New Zealand (NZL)	1:31:52	
72	Sérgio Vieira	Portugal (POR)	1:31:55	
73	Gintaras Andriuškevičius	Lithuania (LTU)	1:32:21	
74	Rasmus Friis	Denmark (DEN)	1:33:19	
75	Torben Bogø Kristiansen	Denmark (DEN)	1:33:25	
76	Modris Liepiņš	Latvia (LAT)	1:33:39	
77	Tobias Persson	Sweden (SWE)	1:33:41	
78	Ján Záhončík	Slovakia (SVK)	1:33:58	
79	Béla Breznai	Hungary (HUN)	1:34:18	
80	Chris Cheeseman	Great Britain (GBR)	1:34:23	
81	Brent Vallance	Australia (AUS)	1:34:44	
82	Aldo Bertoldi	Switzerland (SUI)	1:34:46	
83	Claudio Apostoli	Switzerland (SUI)	1:34:54	
84	Károly Faragó	Hungary (HUN)	1:35:16	
85	Subramaniam Karunanithi	Malaysia (MAS)	1:35:26	
86	Philip Dunn	United States (USA)	1:35:40	
87	Virgilho Soares	Portugal (POR)	1:35:49	
88	Jani Lehtinen	Finland (FIN)	1:36:23	
89	Bernard Binggeli	Switzerland (SUI)	1:37:09	
90	Sabir Sharuyayev	Kazakhstan (KAZ)	1:37:15	
91	Rudolf Cogan	Czech Republic (CZE)	1:37:27	
92	Claus Jørgensen	Denmark (DEN)	1:37:32	
93	Nehad Essayed Abdelhamid	Egypt (EGY)	1:37:38	
94	Eryan Myrzabekov	Kazakhstan (KAZ)	1:37:48	
95	Graeme Jones	New Zealand (NZL)	1:39:08	
96	Harmana Ram	India (IND)	1:40:03	
97	Dave McGovern	United States (USA)	1:40:06	
98	Satoshi Yanagisawa	Japan (JPN)	1:40:12	
99	Tony Sargisson	New Zealand (NZL)	1:40:26	
100	Walid Abdel Fattahaly	Egypt (EGY)	1:43:00	
101	Rajoo Mogan	Malaysia (MAS)	1:45:05	
102	Hamed Farag	Egypt (EGY)	1:47:23	
103	Charan Singh Rathi	India (IND)	1:48:56	
104	Ellangovan Thirumai	Malaysia (MAS)	1:49:46	
105	Rishat Shafikov	Russia (RUS)	1:52:13	
106	Pradeep Chand	Fiji (FIJ)	1:52:30	
107	Jagdav Singh Tikka	India (IND)	1:53:25	
108	Pramesh Prasad	Fiji (FIJ)	1:54:59	
109	Dip Chand	Fiji (FIJ)	1:56:16	
110	Zoran Ivanković	Yugoslavia (YUG)	1:58:52	
111	Zivadin Milenković	Yugoslavia (YUG)	2:03:32	
—	Daniel Plaza	Spain (ESP)	DQ	
—	Fernando Vázquez	Spain (ESP)	DQ	
—	Narinder Harbans Singh	Malaysia (MAS)	DQ	
—	Riecus Blignaut	South Africa (RSA)	DQ	
—	Ruslan Shafikov	Russia (RUS)	DQ	
—	Ademar Kammler	Brazil (BRA)	DNF	
—	Klaus Jensen	Denmark (DEN)	DNF	
—	Valentí Massana	Spain (ESP)	DNF	
—	Kim Lappalainen	Finland (FIN)	DNF	
—	Robert Ihly	Germany (GER)	DNF	
—	Arturo Di Mezza	Italy (ITA)	DNF	
—	Scott Nelson	New Zealand (NZL)	DNF	
—	Vladimir Andreyev	Russia (RUS)	DNF	

==== Team (20 km Men) ====
Place	Country	Points
1st place, gold medalist(s)	China	436 pts
2nd place, silver medalist(s)	Italy	422 pts
3rd place, bronze medalist(s)	Mexico	420 pts
4	France	409 pts
5	Poland	392 pts
6	Belarus	384 pts
7	Japan	357 pts
8	Slovakia	340 pts
9	Czech Republic	339 pts
10	Russia	334 pts
11	Australia	320 pts
12	Germany	320 pts
13	United Kingdom	314 pts
14	Ukraine	313 pts
15	United States	308 pts
16	Lithuania	305 pts
17	Sweden	298 pts
18	Latvia	292 pts
19	Hungary	288 pts
20	Portugal	288 pts
21	Brazil	254 pts
22	Kazakhstan	241 pts
23	Denmark	241 pts
24	FR Yugoslavia	235 pts
25	Malaysia	232 pts
26	Switzerland	231 pts
27	South Africa	228 pts
28	New Zealand	224 pts
29	Egypt	201 pts
30	India	191 pts
31	Finland	181 pts
32	Fiji	178 pts
33	Spain	120 pts

=== Men's 50 km ===
Place	Athlete	Nation	Time	Notes
1st place, gold medalist(s)	Zhao Yongsheng	China (CHN)	3:41:20	
2nd place, silver medalist(s)	Jesús Ángel García	Spain (ESP)	3:41:54	
3rd place, bronze medalist(s)	Valentin Kononen	Finland (FIN)	3:42:50	
4	Valeriy Spitsyn	Russia (RUS)	3:43:36	
5	Miguel Rodríguez	Mexico (MEX)	3:44:07	
6	Viktor Ginko	Belarus (BLR)	3:45:48	
7	René Piller	France (FRA)	3:45:56	
8	Carlos Mercenario	Mexico (MEX)	3:56:41	
9	Sergey Korepanov	Kazakhstan (KAZ)	3:48:06	
10	Aleksey Voyevodin	Russia (RUS)	3:48:55	
11	Germán Sánchez	Mexico (MEX)	3:49:29	
12	Giovanni De Benedictis	Italy (ITA)	3:49:30	
13	Štefan Malík	Slovakia (SVK)	3:49:47	
14	Vitaliy Popovich	Ukraine (UKR)	3:51:53	
15	Sándor Urbanik	Hungary (HUN)	3:52:07	
16	Jaime Barroso	Spain (ESP)	3:53:37	
17	Nikolay Matyukhin	Russia (RUS)	3:53:40	
18	German Skurygin	Russia (RUS)	3:54:48	
19	Peter Tichý	Slovakia (SVK)	3:55:29	
20	Andrés Marin	Spain (ESP)	3:55:58	
21	Jean-Claude Corre	France (FRA)	3:56:57	
22	Wei Han	China (CHN)	3:57:03	
23	Filberto Pantoja	Mexico (MEX)	3:57:25	
24	Paolo Bianchi	Italy (ITA)	3:59:53	
25	Giuseppe De Gaetano	Italy (ITA)	4:00:37	
26	Roman Mrázek	Slovakia (SVK)	4:00:47	
27	Henrik Kjellgren	Sweden (SWE)	4:01:03	
28	Antero Lindman	Finland (FIN)	4:01:16	
29	Andrey Plotnikov	Russia (RUS)	4:02:09	
30	Fumio Imamura	Japan (JPN)	4:02:11	
31	Aleksandr Potashov	Belarus (BLR)	4:02:20	
32	Sylvain Caudron	France (FRA)	4:02:44	
33	Patrizio Parchesepe	Italy (ITA)	4:02:45	
34	Artur Shumak	Belarus (BLR)	4:02:46	
35	José Magalhães	Portugal (POR)	4:02:57	
36	Miloš Holuša	Czech Republic (CZE)	4:03:24	
37	Thomas Wallstab	Germany (GER)	4:03:30	
38	Tadahiro Kosaka	Japan (JPN)	4:04:42	
39	Basilio Labrador	Spain (ESP)	4:05:36	
40	Ervin Leczky	Hungary (HUN)	4:05:38	
41	Michael Harvey	Australia (AUS)	4:05:58	
42	Mark Easton	Great Britain (GBR)	4:06:01	
43	Carl Schueler	United States (USA)	4:06:45	
44	Les Morton	Great Britain (GBR)	4:08:52	
45	Zoltán Czukor	Hungary (HUN)	4:10:18	
46	Alain Lemercier	France (FRA)	4:10:36	
47	Harold van Beek	Netherlands (NED)	4:10:52	
48	Marco Evoniuk	United States (USA)	4:11:31	
49	Ulf-Peter Sjöholm	Sweden (SWE)	4:12:34	
50	Yuriy Gordeyev	Kazakhstan (KAZ)	4:12:49	
51	Veijo Savikko	Finland (FIN)	4:13:21	
52	Bo Gustafsson	Sweden (SWE)	4:14:08	
53	Andrzej Chylinski	United States (USA)	4:14:14	
54	Arto Hokkanen	Finland (FIN)	4:14:22	
55	Peter Zanner	Germany (GER)	4:14:45	
56	Pascal Kieffer	France (FRA)	4:14:51	
57	Johan Moerdyk	South Africa (RSA)	4:16:25	
58	Ronald Weigel	Germany (GER)	4:16:44	
59	Pyotr Palagitski	Ukraine (UKR)	4:16:48	
60	Vladimir Soyka	Ukraine (UKR)	4:18:38	
61	Augusto Cardoso	Portugal (POR)	4:19:43	
62	Jaroslav Makovec	Czech Republic (CZE)	4:19:44	
63	Alessandro Mistretta	Italy (ITA)	4:19:53	
64	Henk Plasman	Netherlands (NED)	4:20:51	
65	Roman Bílek	Czech Republic (CZE)	4:21:36	
66	Daugvinas Zujus	Lithuania (LTU)	4:22:20	
67	Pedro Huntjens	Netherlands (NED)	4:22:27	
68	Mark Thomas	Australia (AUS)	4:22:28	
69	Jiao Baozhong	China (CHN)	4:25:38	
70	Vasiliy Malykh	Kazakhstan (KAZ)	4:28:15	
71	Luís Ribeiro	Portugal (POR)	4:28:53	
72	Graham White	Great Britain (GBR)	4:29:41	
73	Duane Cousins	Australia (AUS)	4:31:29	
74	Jeff Cassin	Canada (CAN)	4:34:33	
75	Oliver Mundell	South Africa (RSA)	4:34:35	
76	Kazimir Verkin	Slovakia (SVK)	4:35:38	
77	Dominic McGrath	Australia (AUS)	4:36:29	
78	José Pinto	Portugal (POR)	4:37:52	
79	Josef Smola	Czech Republic (CZE)	4:42:17	
80	Fredrik Svensson	Sweden (SWE)	4:42:46	
81	Eugene Kitts	United States (USA)	4:45:04	
82	Zbignevas Stankevičius	Lithuania (LTU)	4:46:38	
83	Rewat Singh	India (IND)	5:04:33	
84	Gurudarsan Singh	India (IND)	5:04:33	
85	Rampal Singh	India (IND)	5:21:17	
—	Tim Berrett	Canada (CAN)	DQ	
—	Jin Guohong	China (CHN)	DQ	
—	Koji Hoga	Japan (JPN)	DQ	
—	Martín Bermúdez	Mexico (MEX)	DQ	
—	Marcel van Gemert	Netherlands (NED)	DQ	
—	Mark Donahoo	Australia (AUS)	DNF	
—	Dmitriy Savaytan	Belarus (BLR)	DNF	
—	Martin St. Pierre	Canada (CAN)	DNF	
—	Zhou Yongsheng	China (CHN)	DNF	
—	Faustino Ruíz	Spain (ESP)	DNF	
—	Steffen Borsch	Germany (GER)	DNF	
—	Axel Noack	Germany (GER)	DNF	
—	Arvydas Vainauskas	Lithuania (LTU)	DNF	
—	Sigitas Vainauskas	Lithuania (LTU)	DNF	
—	Andre Enslin	South Africa (RSA)	DNF	
—	Niclas Nordenström	Sweden (SWE)	DNF	
—	Jonathan Matthews	United States (USA)	DNF	

==== Team (50 km Men) ====
Place	Country	Points
1st place, gold medalist(s)	Mexico	426 pts
2nd place, silver medalist(s)	Russia	419 pts
3rd place, bronze medalist(s)	Spain	413 pts
4	Slovakia	395 pts
5	France	394 pts
6	Italy	393 pts
7	Belarus	386 pts
8	Finland	376 pts
9	China	369 pts
10	Hungary	360 pts
11	Kazakhstan	336 pts
12	Sweden	336 pts
13	Ukraine	333 pts
14	United States	323 pts
15	Germany	319 pts
16	United Kingdom	311 pts
17	Czech Republic	308 pts
18	Portugal	304 pts
19	Netherlands	296 pts
20	Australia	291 pts
21	India	243 pts
22	Japan	239 pts
23	South Africa	185 pts
24	Lithuania	176 pts
25	Canada	85 pts

=== Lugano Trophy (Team overall Men) ===
The Lugano Trophy, combined the 20 km and 50 km events team results.

Place	Country	Points
1st place, gold medalist(s)	Mexico	846 pts
2nd place, silver medalist(s)	Italy	815 pts
3rd place, bronze medalist(s)	China	805 pts
4	France	803 pts
5	Belarus	770 pts
6	Russia	753 pts
7	Slovakia	735 pts
8	Hungary	648 pts
9	Czech Republic	647 pts
10	Ukraine	646 pts
11	Germany	639 pts
12	Sweden	634 pts
13	United States	631 pts
14	United Kingdom	625 pts
15	Australia	611 pts
16	Japan	596 pts
17	Portugal	592 pts
18	Kazakhstan	577 pts
19	Finland	557 pts
20	Spain	533 pts
21	Lithuania	481 pts
22	India	434 pts
23	South Africa	413 pts
24	Poland	392 pts
25	Netherlands	296 pts
26	Latvia	292 pts
27	Brazil	254 pts
28	Denmark	241 pts
29	FR Yugoslavia	235 pts
30	Malaysia	232 pts
31	Switzerland	231 pts
32	New Zealand	224 pts
33	Egypt	201 pts
34	Fiji	178 pts
35	Canada	85 pts

=== Women's 10 km ===
Place	Athlete	Nation	Time	Notes
1st place, gold medalist(s)	Gao Hongmiao	China (CHN)	42:19	
2nd place, silver medalist(s)	Yelena Nikolayeva	Russia (RUS)	42:32	
3rd place, bronze medalist(s)	Liu Hongyu	China (CHN)	42:49	
4	Gu Yan	China (CHN)	42:55	
5	Kerry Saxby-Junna	Australia (AUS)	42:58	
6	Elisabetta Perrone	Italy (ITA)	43:13	
7	Rossella Giordano	Italy (ITA)	43:44	
8	Annarita Sidoti	Italy (ITA)	43:55	
9	Tamara Kovalenko	Russia (RUS)	43:56	
10	Katarzyna Radtke	Poland (POL)	44:07	
11	Fan Xiaoling	China (CHN)	44:10	
12	Sari Essayah	Finland (FIN)	44:21	
13	Valentina Tsybulskaya	Belarus (BLR)	44:23	
14	Wang Yan	China (CHN)	44:25	
15	Susana Feitor	Portugal (POR)	44:25	
16	Encarna Granados	Spain (ESP)	44:28	
17	Yelena Gruzinova	Russia (RUS)	44:31	
18	Tatyana Ragozina	Ukraine (UKR)	44:35	
19	Cristiana Pellino	Italy (ITA)	44:38	
20	Olga Kardopoltseva	Belarus (BLR)	45:09	
21	Natalya Misyulya	Belarus (BLR)	45:11	
22	Kathrin Born-Boyde	Germany (GER)	45:23	
23	Graciela Mendoza	Mexico (MEX)	45:24	
24	Anne Manning	Australia (AUS)	45:26	
25	Maria del Rosario Sánchez	Mexico (MEX)	45:29	
26	María Vasco	Spain (ESP)	45:40	
27	Sonata Milušauskaitė	Lithuania (LTU)	45:41	
28	Anikó Szebenszky	Hungary (HUN)	45:46	
29	Mária Rosza-Urbanik	Hungary (HUN)	45:48	
30	Francisca Martínez	Mexico (MEX)	45:51	
31	Ileana Salvador	Italy (ITA)	45:55	
32	Valérie Lévèque-Nadaud	France (FRA)	45:56	
33	Michelle Rohl	United States (USA)	45:57	
34	Yuka Mitsumori	Japan (JPN)	45:57	
35	Lisa Langford-Kehler	Great Britain (GBR)	46:00	
36	Ildikó Ilyés	Hungary (HUN)	46:00	
37	Nathalie Marchand-Fortain	France (FRA)	46:09	
38	Emilia Cano	Spain (ESP)	46:14	
39	Yuka Kamioka	Japan (JPN)	46:16	
40	Teresa Letherby	Australia (AUS)	46:23	
41	Victoria Herazo	United States (USA)	46:25	
42	Marta Żukowska	Poland (POL)	46:38	
43	Janice McCaffrey	Canada (CAN)	46:43	
44	Tina Poitras	Canada (CAN)	46:44	
45	Simone Thust	Germany (GER)	46:45	
46	Anne-Catherine Berthonnaud	France (FRA)	46:49	
47	Emi Hayashi	Japan (JPN)	46:55	
48	Teresa Palacios	Spain (ESP)	46:57	
49	Jana Weidemann	Germany (GER)	47:02	
50	Vicky Lupton	Great Britain (GBR)	47:04	
51	Debbie van Orden	United States (USA)	47:08	
52	Lynda Brubaker	United States (USA)	47:55	
53	Wendy Muldoon	Australia (AUS)	47:56	
54	Jane Barbour	Australia (AUS)	47:58	
55	María Colín	Mexico (MEX)	48:01	
56	Pascale Grand	Canada (CAN)	48:15	
57	Yuko Sato	Japan (JPN)	48:15	
58	Maribel Rebollo	Mexico (MEX)	48:16	
59	Cal Partington	Great Britain (GBR)	48:17	
60	Holly Gerke	Canada (CAN)	48:20	
61	Andrea Alföldi	Hungary (HUN)	48:20	
62	Veronica Öqvist	Sweden (SWE)	48:21	
63	Isilda Gonçalves	Portugal (POR)	48:23	
64	Nora Leksir	France (FRA)	48:24	
65	Yelena Veremeychuk	Ukraine (UKR)	48:28	
66	Leonarda Yukhevich	Belarus (BLR)	48:35	
67	Kristina Saltanovič	Lithuania (LTU)	48:37	
68	Verity Larby-Snook	Great Britain (GBR)	48:42	
69	Svetlana Tolstaya	Kazakhstan (KAZ)	48:47	
70	Sandy Leddin	Germany (GER)	49:11	
71	Anne Perttola	Finland (FIN)	49:20	
72	Miki Itakura	Japan (JPN)	49:29	
73	Monica Gunnarsson	Sweden (SWE)	49:38	
74	Sofia Avoila	Portugal (POR)	49:43	
75	Cheng Tong Lean	Malaysia (MAS)	49:44	
76	Annastasia Raj	Malaysia (MAS)	50:27	
77	Maya Sazonova	Kazakhstan (KAZ)	50:31	
78	Alison Baker	Canada (CAN)	50:43	
79	Beata Kaczmarska	Poland (POL)	50:45	
80	Nadine Mazuir-Vavre	France (FRA)	50:49	
81	Melanie Wright	Great Britain (GBR)	50:50	
82	Yakobe Amsale	Ethiopia (ETH)	50:50	
83	Gete Koma	Ethiopia (ETH)	50:51	
84	Rachel Gibbon	New Zealand (NZL)	51:02	
85	Galina Arutinova	Kazakhstan (KAZ)	51:11	
86	Ligia Gonçalves	Portugal (POR)	51:23	
87	Aberash Adera	Ethiopia (ETH)	51:49	
88	Debbie Beckley	South Africa (RSA)	51:50	
89	Sada Bukšnienė	Lithuania (LTU)	52:15	
90	Kaisa Suhonen	Finland (FIN)	52:25	
91	Valentina Savchuk	Ukraine (UKR)	52:35	
92	Mónika Pesti	Hungary (HUN)	53:11	
93	Felicita Falconer	South Africa (RSA)	53:31	
94	Barbara Nell	South Africa (RSA)	53:35	
95	Teoh Tay Wah	Malaysia (MAS)	55:27	
96	Lynley Mathieson	New Zealand (NZL)	57:13	
—	Christine Tuka	New Zealand (NZL)	DQ	
—	Yelena Arshintseva	Russia (RUS)	DQ	
—	Irina Stankina	Russia (RUS)	DQ	
—	Olga Leonenko	Ukraine (UKR)	DQ	Doping^{†}
—	Jenny Jones-Billington	New Zealand (NZL)	DNF	
—	Sue Bingham	South Africa (RSA)	DNF	
—	Jessica Franzén	Sweden (SWE)	DNF	
—	Teresa Vaill	United States (USA)	DNF	

^{†}: Olga Leonenko from Ukraine was initially 7th (43:34), but disqualified because of doping violations.

=== Eschborn Cup (Team Women 10 km) ===
Place	Country	Points
1st place, gold medalist(s)	China	443 pts
2nd place, silver medalist(s)	Italy	429 pts
3rd place, bronze medalist(s)	Russia	424 pts
4	Belarus	403 pts
5	Australia	388 pts
6	Mexico	381 pts
7	Spain	379 pts
8	Hungary	367 pts
9	France	347 pts
10	Germany	346 pts
11	Poland	342 pts
12	Japan	342 pts
13	United States	338 pts
14	Portugal	331 pts
15	United Kingdom	326 pts
16	Canada	324 pts
17	Finland	317 pts
18	Ukraine	314 pts
19	Lithuania	307 pts
20	Kazakhstan	274 pts
21	Malaysia	263 pts
22	Ethiopia	262 pts
23	South Africa	243 pts
24	Sweden	196 pts
25	New Zealand	164 pts

== Participation ==
The participation of 330 athletes (226 men/104 women) from 36 countries is reported.

- Australia (8/5)
- Belarus (8/4)
- Brazil (3/-)
- Canada (3/5)
- China (10/5)
- Czech Republic (8/-)
- Denmark (4/-)
- Egypt (3/-)
- Ethiopia (-/3)
- Fiji (3/-)
- Finland (7/3)
- France (10/5)
- Germany (9/4)
- Hungary (6/5)
- India (6/-)
- Italy (10/5)
- Japan (7/5)
- Kazakhstan (6/3)
- Latvia (3/-)
- Lithuania (7/3)
- Malaysia (5/3)
- Mexico (10/5)
- Netherlands (4/-)
- New Zealand (4/4)
- Poland (3/3)
- Portugal (8/4)
- Russia (10/5)
- Slovakia (8/-)
- South Africa (6/4)
- Spain (9/4)
- Sweden (8/3)
- Switzerland (3/-)
- Ukraine (7/4)
- United Kingdom (7/5)
- United States (10/5)
- (Federal Republic of Yugoslavia) Yugoslavia (3)

== See also ==
- 1995 Race Walking Year Ranking
