= 1999 World Championships in Athletics – Men's 50 kilometres walk =

The Men's 50 km Walk at the 1999 World Championships in Sevilla, Spain was held on Wednesday August 25, 1999, with the start at 07:45h local time

The first person to cross the finish line was Russian German Skurygin. Unlike the other DQ's listed for form violations (loss of contact or bent knee), his was announced two years later. He was disqualified for a doping violation, one of the first for a string of doping violations by athletes in the charge of his coach Viktor Chegin. Skurygin was removed from the results all athletes behind him advancing one place. Skurygin died of a heart attack 9 years later at age 45.

== Medalists ==
Gold	Ivano Brugnetti; Italy (ITA)
Silver	Nikolay Matyukhin; Russia (RUS)
Bronze	Curt Clausen; United States (USA)

== Abbreviations ==
- All times shown are in hours:minutes:seconds

DNS	did not start
NM	no mark
WR	world record
WL	world leading
AR	area record
NR	national record
PB	personal best
SB	season best

== Intermediates ==
Rank	Number	Athlete	Time
5 KILOMETRES
1	371	Jesús Ángel García (ESP)	23:43
2	1002	Miguel Rodríguez (MEX)	23:43
3	1245	Nikolay Matyukhin (RUS)	23:43
4	1146	Robert Korzeniowski (POL)	23:43
5	378	Valentí Massana (ESP)	23:43
10 KILOMETRES
1	922	Aigars Fadejevs (LAT)	46:20
2	1261	Yevgeniy Shmalyuk (RUS)	46:24
3	1263	German Skurygin (RUS)	46:24
4	1245	Nikolay Matyukhin (RUS)	46:30
5	371	Jesús Ángel García (ESP)	46:30
15 KILOMETRES
1	922	Aigars Fadejevs (LAT)	1:07:59
2	1263	German Skurygin (RUS)	1:08:42
3	371	Jesús Ángel García (ESP)	1:08:42
4	1261	Yevgeniy Shmalyuk (RUS)	1:08:42
5	1245	Nikolay Matyukhin (RUS)	1:09:06
20 KILOMETRES
1	922	Aigars Fadejevs (LAT)	1:29:39
2	1263	German Skurygin (RUS)	1:30:54
3	1261	Yevgeniy Shmalyuk (RUS)	1:30:56
4	371	Jesús Ángel García (ESP)	1:30:57
5	1450	Curt Clausen (USA)	1:31:38
25 KILOMETRES
1	922	Aigars Fadejevs (LAT)	1:52:01
2	1263	German Skurygin (RUS)	1:52:50
3	1261	Yevgeniy Shmalyuk (RUS)	1:53:48
4	371	Jesús Ángel García (ESP)	1:53:48
5	1146	Robert Korzeniowski (POL)	1:54:14
30 KILOMETRES
1	1263	German Skurygin (RUS)	2:14:33
2	769	Ivano Brugnetti (ITA)	2:16:46
3	1146	Robert Korzeniowski (POL)	2:16:46
4	1450	Curt Clausen (USA)	2:16:46
5	1245	Nikolay Matyukhin (RUS)	2:16:46
35 KILOMETRES
1	1263	German Skurygin (RUS)	2:36:14
2	1146	Robert Korzeniowski (POL)	2:39:07
3	1450	Curt Clausen (USA)	2:39:08
4	769	Ivano Brugnetti (ITA)	2:39:08
5	912	Sergey Korepanov (KAZ)	2:39:20
40 KILOMETRES
1	1263	German Skurygin (RUS)	2:58:15
2	769	Ivano Brugnetti (ITA)	3:01:47
3	1245	Nikolay Matyukhin (RUS)	3:02:02
4	1450	Curt Clausen (USA)	3:02:18
5	912	Sergey Korepanov (KAZ)	3:03:49
45 KILOMETRES
1	1263	German Skurygin (RUS)	3:20:42
2	769	Ivano Brugnetti (ITA)	3:24:41
3	1245	Nikolay Matyukhin (RUS)	3:25:05
4	1450	Curt Clausen (USA)	3:26:35
5	378	Valentí Massana (ESP)	3:28:04

== Final ranking ==
Rank	Athlete	Time	Note
1st place, gold medalist(s)	Ivano Brugnetti (ITA)	3:47:54	PB
2nd place, silver medalist(s)	Nikolay Matyukhin (RUS)	3:48:18	
3rd place, bronze medalist(s)	Curt Clausen (USA)	3:50:55	
4	Valentí Massana (ESP)	3:51:55	
5	Robert Ihly (GER)	3:53:47	
6	Arturo Di Mezza (ITA)	3:53:50	
7	Craig Barrett (NZL)	3:54:38	
8	Yang Yongjian (CHN)	3:55:23	PB
9	René Piller (FRA)	3:56:39	
10	Modris Liepins (LAT)	3:57:11	
11	Theodoros Stamatopoulos (GRE)	3:58:37	PB
12	Dion Russell (AUS)	3:59:23	
13	Aleksandar Raković (YUG)	3:59:56	
14	Ma Hongye (CHN)	4:01:28	
15	Fumio Imamura (JPN)	4:01:47	
16	Milos Holusa (CZE)	4:03:20	
17	Spiridon Kastanis (GRE)	4:03:59	
18	Wang Yinhang (CHN)	4:04:57	
19	Roman Magdziarczyk (POL)	4:05:10	
20	Gyula Dudás (HUN)	4:05:58	
21	Pedro Martins (POR)	4:06:31	
22	Bengt Bengtsson (SWE)	4:09:34	
23	Carlos Mercenario (MEX)	4:09:40	
24	Denis Franke (GER)	4:10:16	
25	Pascal Servanty (FRA)	4:11:02	
26	Santiago Pérez (ESP)	4:11:30	
27	Akihiko Koike (JPN)	4:18:43	
28	Jeff Cassin (IRL)	4:20:43	
29	Klaus David Jensen (DEN)	4:32:06	
DID NOT FINISH (DNF)
	Joel Sánchez (MEX)	DNF	
	Trond Nymark (NOR)	DNF	
	Valentin Kononen (FIN)	DNF	
	Jesús Ángel García (ESP)	DNF	
	Viktor Ginko (BLR)	DNF	
	Giovanni Perricelli (ITA)	DNF	
	Yevgeniy Shmalyuk (RUS)	DNF	
	Sergey Korepanov (KAZ)	DNF	
	Sylvain Caudron (FRA)	DNF	
	Miguel Rodríguez (MEX)	DNF	
DISQUALIFIED (DSQ)
	Peter Tichy (SVK)	DSQ	
	Denis Trautmann (GER)	DSQ	
	Daugvinas Zujus (LTU)	DSQ	
	Jacob Sørensen (DEN)	DSQ	
	Tomasz Lipiec (POL)	DSQ	
	Zoltán Czukor (HUN)	DSQ	
	Aigars Fadejevs (LAT)	DSQ	
	German Skurygin (RUS)	DSQ	
	Andrew Hermann (USA)	DSQ	
	Tim Berrett (CAN)	DSQ	
	Robert Korzeniowski (POL)	DSQ	
	Allen Heppner (USA)	DSQ	
	Igor Kollár (SVK)	DSQ	

== See also ==
- 1999 Race Walking Year Ranking
