= 1997 World Championships in Athletics – Men's 50 kilometres walk =

These are the official results of the Men's 50 km Walk event at the 1997 World Championships held on Thursday 7 August 1997 in Athens, Greece. There were a total number of 42 participating athletes.

== Medalists ==
Gold	Robert Korzeniowski; Poland (POL)
Silver	Jesús Ángel García; Spain (ESP)
Bronze	Miguel Rodríguez; Mexico (MEX)

== Abbreviations ==
- All times shown are in hours:minutes:seconds

DNS	did not start
NM	no mark
WR	world record
WL	world leading
AR	area record
NR	national record
PB	personal best
SB	season best

== Final ranking ==
Rank	Athlete	Time	Note
1st place, gold medalist(s)	Robert Korzeniowski (POL)	3:44:46	
2nd place, silver medalist(s)	Jesús Ángel García (ESP)	3:44:59	
3rd place, bronze medalist(s)	Miguel Rodríguez (MEX)	3:48:30	
4	Oleg Ishutkin (RUS)	3:50:04	
5	Tomasz Lipiec (POL)	3:50:14	
6	Fumio Imamura (JPN)	3:50:27	
7	Sylvain Caudron (FRA)	3:51:17	
8	Arturo Di Mezza (ITA)	3:51:33	
9	Valentin Kononen (FIN)	3:53:40	
10	Aleksey Voyevodin (RUS)	3:54:28	
11	René Piller (FRA)	3:55:06	
12	Sergey Korepanov (KAZ)	3:56:19	
13	Craig Barrett (NZL)	3:56:30	
14	Giovanni Perricelli (ITA)	3:57:38	
15	Nikolay Matyukhin (RUS)	3:58:18	
16	Axel Noack (GER)	3:59:29	
17	Héctor Moreno (COL)	3:59:33	
18	Štefan Malík (SVK)	3:59:52	
19	Ruben Arikado (MEX)	4:04:17	
20	Zoltán Czukor (HUN)	4:05:09	
21	Santiago Perez (ESP)	4:05:25	
22	Dmitriy Savaytan (BLR)	4:05:35	
23	Julio César Urías (GUA)	4:07:18	
24	Peter Zanner (GER)	4:07:38	
25	Christophe Cousin (FRA)	4:08:26	
26	Milos Holusa (CZE)	4:09:08	
27	José Magalhaes (POR)	4:10:03	
28	Orazio Romanzi (ITA)	4:11:00	
29	Christos Karagiorgos (GRE)	4:30:05	
DID NOT FINISH (DNF)
—	Zhao Yongsheng (CHN)	DNF	
—	Jaime Barroso (ESP)	DNF	
—	Tim Berrett (CAN)	DNF	
—	Bo Gustafsson (SWE)	DNF	
—	Viktor Ginko (BLR)	DNF	
DISQUALIFIED (DSQ)
—	Peter Tichý (SVK)	DSQ	
—	Roman Mrázek (SVK)	DSQ	
—	Dirk Nicque (BEL)	DSQ	
—	Jacek Muller (POL)	DSQ	
—	Germán Sánchez (MEX)	DSQ	
—	Thomas Wallstab (GER)	DSQ	
—	Andrew Hermann (USA)	DSQ	
—	Aleksandar Raković (YUG)	DSQ	

== See also ==
- 1994 Men's European Championships 50km Walk (Helsinki)
- 1996 Men's Olympic 50km Walk (Atlanta)
- 1998 Men's European Championships 50km Walk (Budapest)
