= 1994 European Athletics Championships – Men's 50 kilometres walk =

Men's 50 kilometres walk at the European Athletics Championships

The Men's 50 km walk event at the 1994 European Championships was held on 13 August 1994 in Helsinki, Finland. There were a total number of 34 participating athletes.

== Medalists ==
| Gold | Valeriy Spitsyn; Russia (RUS) |
| Silver | Thierry Toutain; France (FRA) |
| Bronze | Giovanni Perricelli; Italy (ITA) |

== Abbreviations ==
- All times shown are in hours:minutes:seconds

| DNS | did not start |
| NM | no mark |
| WR | world record |
| WL | world leading |
| AR | area record |
| NR | national record |
| PB | personal best |
| SB | season best |

== Final ranking ==
| Rank | Athlete | Time | Note |
|---|---|---|---|
| 1st place, gold medalist(s) | Valeriy Spitsyn (RUS) | 3:41:07 | |
| 2nd place, silver medalist(s) | Thierry Toutain (FRA) | 3:43:52 | |
| 3rd place, bronze medalist(s) | Giovanni Perricelli (ITA) | 3:43:55 | |
| 4 | Jesús Ángel García (ESP) | 3:45:25 | |
| 5 | Robert Korzeniowski (POL) | 3:45:57 | |
| 6 | German Skurygin (RUS) | 3:46:30 | |
| 7 | Valentin Kononen (FIN) | 3:47:14 | |
| 8 | Andrey Plotnikov (RUS) | 3:47:43 | |
| 9 | Pavol Blažek (SVK) | 3:49:44 | |
| 10 | Axel Noack (GER) | 3:50:32 | |
| 11 | Zoltán Czukor (HUN) | 3:51:25 | |
| 12 | Andrés Marín (ESP) | 3:52:14 | |
| 13 | Alain Lemercier (FRA) | 3:54:44 | |
| 14 | Arturo Di Mezza (ITA) | 3:56:00 | |
| 15 | Peter Tichý (SVK) | 3:56:55 | |
| 16 | Miloš Holuša (CZE) | 3:57:24 | |
| 17 | Basilio Labrador (ESP) | 3:58:58 | |
| 18 | Stefan Johansson (SWE) | 4:00:18 | |
| 19 | Aleksandar Raković (Independent European Participants) | 4:01:17 | |
| 20 | Pascal Charrière (SUI) | 4:02:25 | |
| 21 | Roman Bílek (CZE) | 4:04:58 | |
| 22 | Štefan Malík (SVK) | 4:07:45 | |
| 23 | Aldo Bertoldi (SUI) | 4:07:48 | |
| 24 | Gyula Dudás (HUN) | 4:15:14 | |
| 25 | Juha Kinnunen (FIN) | 4:18:42 | |
DISQUALIFIED (DSQ)
| — | Aleksandr Potashov (BLR) | DSQ | |
| — | Artur Shumak (BLR) | DSQ | |
| — | Viktor Ginko (BLR) | DSQ | |
| — | René Piller (FRA) | DSQ | |
| — | Giuseppe De Gaetano (ITA) | DSQ | |
DID NOT FINISH (DNF)
| — | Modris Liepiņš (LAT) | DNF | |
| — | Risto Nurmi (FIN) | DNF | |
| — | Thomas Wallstab (GER) | DNF | |
| — | Robert Ihly (GER) | DNF | |

== Participation ==
According to an unofficial count, 34 athletes from 15 countries participated in the event.

- Belarus (3)
- Czech Republic (2)
- Finland (3)
- France (3)
- Germany (3)
- Hungary (2)
- Independent European Participants (1)
- Italy (3)
- Latvia (1)
- Poland (1)
- Russia (3)
- Slovakia (3)
- Spain (3)
- Sweden (1)
- Switzerland (2)

== See also ==
- 1991 Men's World Championships 50km Walk (Tokyo)
- 1992 Men's Olympic 50km Walk (Barcelona)
- 1993 Men's World Championships 50km Walk (Stuttgart)
- 1995 Men's World Championships 50km Walk (Gothenburg)
- 1996 Men's Olympic 50km Walk (Atlanta)
- 1997 Men's World Championships 50km Walk (Athens)
