= 1995 World Championships in Athletics – Men's 50 kilometres walk =

These are the official results of the Men's 50 km Walk event at the 1995 World Championships held on Thursday 10 August 1995 in Gothenburg, Sweden. There were a total number of 41 participating athletes.

== Medalists ==
Gold	Valentin Kononen; Finland (FIN)
Silver	Giovanni Perricelli; Italy (ITA)
Bronze	Robert Korzeniowski; Poland (POL)

== Abbreviations ==
- All times shown are in hours:minutes:seconds

DNS	did not start
NM	no mark
WR	world record
WL	world leading
AR	area record
NR	national record
PB	personal best
SB	season best

== Final ==
RANK	FINAL RANKING	TIME
	Valentin Kononen (FIN)	3:43.42
	Giovanni Perricelli (ITA)	3:45.11
	Robert Korzeniowski (POL)	3:45.57
4.	Miguel Angel Rodríguez (MEX)	3:46.34
5.	Jesús Ángel García (ESP)	3:48.05
6.	Aleksandar Raković (YUG)	3:49.35
7.	Arturo Di Mezza (ITA)	3:49.46
8.	René Piller (FRA)	3:49.47
9.	Sergey Korepanov (KAZ)	3:51.55
10.	Nikolay Matyukhin (RUS)	3:53.25
11.	Štefan Malík (SVK)	3:54.23
12.	Carlos Mercenario (MEX)	3:55.24
13.	Axel Noack (GER)	3:55.51
14.	Tim Berrett (CAN)	3:57.13
15.	Aleksey Voyevodin (RUS)	3:59.23
16.	Jaime Barroso (ESP)	4:01.23
17.	Pavol Blažek (SVK)	4:03.45
18.	Henrik Kjellgren (SWE)	4:04.38
19.	Miloš Holuša (CZE)	4:04.59
20.	Fumio Imamura (JPN)	4:06.08
21.	José Magalhaes (POR)	4:09.38
22.	Craig Barrett (NZL)	4:10.26
23.	Andres Marín (ESP)	4:12.01
24.	Jean-Claude Corre (FRA)	4:12.38
25.	Eloy Quispe (BOL)	4:16.21
26.	Michael Harvey (AUS)	4:16.41
—	Sándor Urbanik (HUN)	DNF
—	Allen James (USA)	DNF
—	Germán Sánchez (MEX)	DNF
—	Valeriy Spitsyn (RUS)	DNF
—	Thierry Toutain (FRA)	DNF
—	Costică Bălan (ROM)	DNF
—	Hubert Sonnek (CZE)	DNF
—	Zhao Yongsheng (CHN)	DNF
—	Giovanni De Benedictis (ITA)	DSQ
—	Ronald Weigel (GER)	DSQ
—	Peter Malik (SVK)	DSQ
—	Viktor Ginko (BLR)	DSQ
—	Vitaliy Popovich (UKR)	DSQ
—	Les Morton (GBR)	DSQ
—	Zoltán Czukor (HUN)	DSQ

== See also ==
- 1992 Men's Olympic 50km Walk (Barcelona)
- 1993 Men's World Championships 50km Walk (Stuttgart)
- 1994 Men's European Championships 50km Walk (Helsinki)
- 1996 Men's Olympic 50km Walk (Atlanta)
- 1997 Men's World Championships 50km Walk (Athens)
