= Dudinská Päťdesiatka =

Race walking competition in Slovakia

- Date: late March
- Location: Dudince, Slovakia
- Event type: Race walking
- Distance: 50km, 20km, 35km
- Established: 1982
- Course records: Men's: 3:34:38 (2015) (Slovakia) Matej Tóth; Women's: 1:26:46 (2015) (Italy) Eleonora Giorgi
- Website: Slovak Athletic Association

The Dudinská Päťdesiatka or Dudinská 50 (Fifty kilometres of Dudince) is an annual race walking competition held in March on the streets of Dudince, Slovakia. The primary focus of the competition is a men's 50 kilometres race walk, from which the event takes its name. There are also two 20 kilometres race walks, one for men and one for women, as well as a variety of shorter races for younger athletes.

== History ==
It holds permit meeting status from the European Athletic Association and is part of the annual IAAF World Race Walking Challenge circuit. The races attract high level international competition, including from China. The race has played host to the European Race Walking Cup on three occasions (1998, 2001 and 2013) – more than any other city. On top of these international events, the Dudince 50 km race has hosted the Slovak national championships on numerous occasions and was also the venue for the Hungarian and Ukrainian national championships in 2000. The competition enjoys strong support from the city and the president of the organising committee is the Mayor of Dudince, PaedDr. Dušan Strieborný.

The race has been the site of several records, including a French record of 3:38:45 hours by Yohann Diniz in 2009, a Slovak record of 3:34:38 hours by Matej Tóth in 2015, and an Irish record of 3:51:32 hours in 2008 by Colin Griffin.

== Past winners ==
Key: Course record Women's 10 km walk

=== Men's 50km and women's 20km walk ===
Edition	Year	Men's winner	Time (h:m:s)	Women's winner	Time (h:m:s)
1st	1982	Pavol Szikora (TCH)	4:02:42	Not held	
2nd	1983	Jozef Hudák (TCH)	4:13:36	Not held	
3rd	1984	Pavol Jati (TCH)	4:09:11	Not held	
4th	1985	Pavol Jati (TCH)	3:57:38	Not held	
5th	1986	Ivo Piták (TCH)	3:51:43	Mária Rósza (HUN)	50:40:9
6th	1987	Pavol Szikora (TCH)	3:42:20	Zuzana Holveková (TCH)	50:29:0
7th	1988	Ján Záhončík (TCH)	3:58:20	Viera Toporeková (TCH)	50:53:5
8th	1989	Hubert Sonnek (TCH)	3:55:16	Jana Zárubová (TCH)	48:28:0
9th	1990	Zoltán Czukor (HUN)	3:55:16	Jana Bičianová (TCH)	49:40:0
10th	1991	Valentin Kononen (FIN)	3:48:54	Tatyana Ragozina (UKR)	45:18:0
11th	1992	Robert Korzeniowski (POL)	3:46:42	Madelein Svensson (SWE)	43:27:0
12th	1993	Sergey Korepanov (KAZ)	4:05:20	Maya Sazonova (KAZ)	46:10:0
13th	1994	Pavol Blažek (SVK)	3:52:45	Mária Rósza (HUN)	44:29:0
14th	1995	Štefan Malík (SVK)	3:48:53	Anna Brnová (SVK)	48:29:0
15th	1996	Vitaliy Popovich (UKR)	3:48:20	Marta Zukowska (POL)	45:11:0
16th	1997	Štefan Malík (SVK)	3:50:20	Valentina Tsybulskaya (BLR)	45:08:0
17th	1998	Tomasz Lipiec (POL)	3:42:57	Nadezhda Ryashkina (RUS)	43:06:0
18th	1999	Aleksandar Raković (YUG)	3:55:24	Lyudmila Yegorova (UKR)	1:41:22
19th	2000	Valentin Kononen (FIN)	3:39:34	Vira Zozulya (UKR)	1:33:45
20th	2001	Sándor Urbanik (HUN)	3:48:41	Usezola Gruber (HUN)	1:48:32
21st	2002	Peter Korčok (SVK)	3:52:49	Vira Zozulya (UKR)	1:39:41
22nd	2003	Luis Fernando García (GUA)	3:57:50	Zuzana Malíková (SVK)	1:38:06
23rd	2004	Peter Korčok (SVK)	3:51:09	Zuzana Malíková (SVK)	1:33:02
24th	2005	Han Yucheng (CHN)	3:40:30	Song Hongjuan (CHN)	1:28:37
25th	2006	Grzegorz Sudoł (POL)	3:50:24	Zuzana Malíková (SVK)	1:33:48
26th	2007	Colin Griffin (IRL)	3:51:32	Zuzana Malíková (SVK)	1:32:19
27th	2008	Grzegorz Sudoł (POL)	3:45:47	Zuzana Malíková (SVK)	1:35:29
28th	2009	Yohann Diniz (FRA)	3:38:45	Lyudmila Shelest (UKR)	1:34:17
29th	2010	Rafał Augustyn (POL)	3:49:54	Zuzana Schindlerová (CZE)	1:34:20
30th	2011	Matej Tóth (SVK)	3:39:46	Olive Loughnane (IRL)	1:32:40
31st	2012	Alex Schwazer (ITA)	3:40:58	Paulina Buziak (POL)	1:33:00
32nd	2013	Erick Barrondo (GUA)	3:41:09	Agnieszka Szwarnóg (POL)	1:31:33
33rd	2014	Rafał Augustyn (POL)	3:45:32	Ainhoa Pinedo (ESP)	1:34:56
34th	2015	Matej Tóth (SVK)	3:34:38	Eleonora Giorgi (ITA)	1:26:46
35th	2016	Rafał Augustyn (POL)	3:43:22	Eleonora Giorgi (ITA)	1:28:05
36th	2017	Håvard Haukenes (NOR)	3:43:40	Živilė Vaiciukevičiūtė (LIT)	1:33:23
37th	2018	Matej Tóth (SVK)	3:42:46	Sandra Arenas (COL)	1:28:48
38th	2019	Håvard Haukenes (NOR)	3:42:50	Sandra Galvis (COL)	1:30:33
39th	2021	Bernardo Barrondo (GUA)	3:47:01	Valeria Ortuño (MEX)	1:29:11
Race distance changed to 35km both for men and women
40th	2022	Massimo Stano (ITA)	2:29:09	Qieyang Shijie (CHN)	2:43:06
42nd	2023	Jose Luis Doctor (MEX)	2:26:37	Kimberly García (PER)	2:37:44 AR
43rd	2024	Teodorico Caporaso (ITA)	2:34:44	Not held	
44th	2025	Evan Dunfee (CAN)	2:21:40	Paula Milena Torres (ECU)	2:44:26
Race distance changed to 42,195km (Marathon) both for men and women
45th	2026	Bence Venyercsan (HUN)	3:03:45	Sofía Ramos Rodríguez (MEX)	3:35:37

=== Men's & women's 20km walk ===
Year	Men's winner	Time (h:m:s)	Women's winner	Time (h:m:s)
2004	Matej Tóth (SVK)	1:23:18		
2005	Zhu Hongjun (CHN)	1:18:37		
2006	Kim Hyun-sub (KOR)	1:22:06		
2007	Rafał Augustyn (POL)	1:23:07		
2008	Matej Tóth (SVK)	1:22:14		
2009	Jakub Jelonek (POL)	1:22:58		
2010	Matej Tóth (SVK)	1:22:25		
2011	Andriy Kovenko (UKR)	1:21:44		
2012	Matej Tóth (SVK)	1:20:42		
2013	Matej Tóth (SVK)	1:22:17		
2014	Matej Tóth (SVK)	1:19:48		
2015	Lebogang Shange (RSA)	1:22:44		
2016	Tom Bosworth (GBR)	1:20:41		
2017	Genadij Kozlovskij (LIT)	1:24:48		
2018	Éider Arévalo (COL)	1:22:13		
2019	Arturas Mastianica (LIT)	1:26:07		
2021	Andrés Olivas (MEX)	1:19:54		
2022	José Alejandro Barrondo (GUA)	1:20:56	Sofía Ramos (MEX)	1:34:04
2023	Éider Arévalo (COL)	1:19:23	Alegna González (MEX)	1:28:09
2024	César Rodríguez (PER)	1:19:41	Evelyn Inga (PER)	1:27:42
2025	Mateo Romero (COL)	1:20:17	Lyudmila Olyanovska (UKR)	1:28:28
Race distance changed to 21,097 km (Half Marathon) both for men and women
2026	Perseus Karlström (SWE)	1:24:58	Evelyn Inga (PER)	1:33:49 AR
