= 1998 European Athletics Championships – Men's 50 kilometres walk =

Men's 50 kilometres walk at the European Athletics Championships

The Men's 50 km walk event at the 1998 European Championships in Budapest, Hungary was held on Friday August 21, 1998.

== Medalists ==
| Gold | Robert Korzeniowski; Poland (POL) |
| Silver | Valentin Kononen; Finland (FIN) |
| Bronze | Andrey Plotnikov; Russia (RUS) |

== Abbreviations ==
- All times shown are in hours:minutes:seconds

| DNS | did not start |
| NM | no mark |
| WR | world record |
| AR | area record |
| NR | national record |
| PB | personal best |
| SB | season best |

== Records ==
Standing records prior to the 1998 European Athletics Championships
| World Record | Andrey Perlov (URS) | 3:37:41 | August 5, 1989 | Leningrad, Soviet Union |
| Event Record | Hartwig Gauder (GDR) | 3:40:55 | August 31, 1986 | Stuttgart, West Germany |

== Final ranking ==
| Rank | Athlete | Time | Note |
|---|---|---|---|
| 1st place, gold medalist(s) | Robert Korzeniowski (POL) | 3:43:51 | SB |
| 2nd place, silver medalist(s) | Valentin Kononen (FIN) | 3:44:29 | SB |
| 3rd place, bronze medalist(s) | Andrey Plotnikov (RUS) | 3:45:53 | |
| 4 | Mikel Odriozola (ESP) | 3:47:24 | PB |
| 5 | Tomasz Lipiec (POL) | 3:48:05 | |
| 6 | Santiago Pérez (ESP) | 3:48:17 | |
| 7 | Arturo Di Mezza (ITA) | 3:48:49 | SB |
| 8 | Denis Trautmann (GER) | 3:49:46 | PB |
| 9 | René Piller (FRA) | 3:51:03 | |
| 10 | Sylvain Caudron (FRA) | 3:54:43 | |
| 11 | Robert Ihly (GER) | 3:55:31 | |
| 12 | Peter Tichy (SVK) | 3:55:37 | SB |
| 13 | Štefan Malík (SVK) | 3:57:35 | |
| 14 | Spiridon Kastanis (GRE) | 3:58:28 | SB |
| 15 | Antero Lindman (FIN) | 3:58:45 | |
| 16 | Nikolay Matyukhin (RUS) | 3:59:23 | |
| 17 | José Magalhaes (POR) | 3:59:46 | |
| 18 | Miloš Holuša (CZE) | 4:01:38 | |
| 19 | Trond Nymark (NOR) | 4:02:33 | |
| 20 | Bengt Bengtsson (SWE) | 4:02:43 | |
| 21 | Peter Korčok (SVK) | 4:04:17 | |
| 22 | Ervin Leczky (HUN) | 4:04:54 | SB |
| 23 | Jacob Sørensen (DEN) | 4:05:25 | |
| 24 | Zoltán Czukor (HUN) | 4:09:02 | |
| 25 | Klaus Jensen (DEN) | 4:15:49 | PB |
DISQUALIFIED (DSQ)
| — | Oleg Ishutkin (RUS) | DSQ | |
| — | Oleg Ginko (BLR) | DSQ | |
| — | Axel Noack (GER) | DSQ | |
| — | Jesús Ángel García (ESP) | DSQ | |
| — | Peter Ferrari (SWE) | DSQ | |
| — | Vitaliy Gordey (BLR) | DSQ | |
| — | Gabor Lengyel (HUN) | DSQ | |
DID NOT FINISH (DNF)
| — | Yevgeniy Misyulya (BLR) | DNF | |
| — | Modris Liepiņš (LAT) | DNF | |
| — | Jan Staaf (SWE) | DNF | |
| — | Pascal Charriere (SUI) | DNF | |
| — | Giovanni Perricelli (ITA) | DNF | |
| — | Aleksandar Raković (SCG) | DNF | |
| — | Stanisław Stosik (POL) | DNF | |
| — | Daugvinas Zujus (LTU) | DNF | |
| — | Alessandro Mistretta (ITA) | DNF | |
| — | Thierry Toutain (FRA) | DNF | |

== See also ==
- 1998 Race Walking Year Ranking
