= 2001 World Championships in Athletics – Men's 50 kilometres walk =

The Men's 50 km Walk event at the 2001 World Championships was held on Saturday August 11, 2001 in Edmonton, Alberta, Canada.

== Medalists ==
Gold	Robert Korzeniowski; Poland (POL)
Silver	Jesús Ángel García; Spain (ESP)
Bronze	Edgar Hernández; Mexico (MEX)

== Abbreviations ==
- All times shown are in hours:minutes:seconds

DNS	did not start
NM	no mark
WR	world record
WL	world leading
AR	area record
NR	national record
PB	personal best
SB	season best

== Records ==
Standing records prior to the 2001 World Athletics Championships
World Record	Valeriy Spitsyn (RUS)	3:37:26	May 21, 2000	Moscow, Russia
Event Record	Hartwig Gauder (GDR)	3:40:53	September 5, 1987	Rome, Italy
Season Best	Nathan Deakes (AUS)	3:43:43	April 8, 2001	Naumburg, Germany

== Intermediates ==
Rank	Number	Athlete	Time
5 KILOMETRES
1	799	Omar Zepeda (MEX)	23:00
2	392	Denis Langlois (FRA)	23:00
3	891	Robert Korzeniowski (POL)	23:00
4	719	Aigars Fadejevs (LAT)	23:01
5	983	Vladimir Potemin (RUS)	23:01
10 KILOMETRES
1	301	Jesús Ángel García (ESP)	45:58
2	865	Craig Barrett (NZL)	45:58
3	891	Robert Korzeniowski (POL)	45:58
4	719	Aigars Fadejevs (LAT)	45:59
5	981	Nikolay Matyukhin (RUS)	45:59
15 KILOMETRES
1	893	Tomasz Lipiec (POL)	1:08:18
2	799	Omar Zepeda (MEX)	1:08:24
3	891	Robert Korzeniowski (POL)	1:08:24
4	719	Aigars Fadejevs (LAT)	1:08:24
5	301	Jesús Ángel García (ESP)	1:08:24
20 KILOMETRES
1	893	Tomasz Lipiec (POL)	1:30:24
2	891	Robert Korzeniowski (POL)	1:30:39
3	721	Modris Liepiņš (LAT)	1:30:39
4	719	Aigars Fadejevs (LAT)	1:30:39
5	796	Miguel Rodríguez (MEX)	1:30:39
25 KILOMETRES
1	893	Tomasz Lipiec (POL)	1:52:28
2	1150	Curt Clausen (USA)	1:52:52
3	719	Aigars Fadejevs (LAT)	1:52:52
4	891	Robert Korzeniowski (POL)	1:52:52
5	983	Vladimir Potemin (RUS)	1:52:52
30 KILOMETRES
1	719	Aigars Fadejevs (LAT)	2:14:26
2	891	Robert Korzeniowski (POL)	2:14:27
3	983	Vladimir Potemin (RUS)	2:14:27
4	981	Nikolay Matyukhin (RUS)	2:14:38
5	301	Jesús Ángel García (ESP)	2:14:38
35 KILOMETRES
1	891	Robert Korzeniowski (POL)	2:36:05
2	719	Aigars Fadejevs (LAT)	2:36:14
3	301	Jesús Ángel García (ESP)	2:36:23
4	983	Vladimir Potemin (RUS)	2:36:33
5	981	Nikolay Matyukhin (RUS)	2:36:52
40 KILOMETRES
1	891	Robert Korzeniowski (POL)	2:57:47
2	301	Jesús Ángel García (ESP)	2:58:34
3	719	Aigars Fadejevs (LAT)	2:58:35
4	983	Vladimir Potemin (RUS)	2:59:08
5	981	Nikolay Matyukhin (RUS)	2:59:49
45 KILOMETRES
1	891	Robert Korzeniowski (POL)	3:19:48
2	301	Jesús Ángel García (ESP)	3:20:56
3	719	Aigars Fadejevs (LAT)	3:21:37
4	983	Vladimir Potemin (RUS)	3:22:29
5	786	Edgar Hernández (MEX)	3:24:03

== Final ranking ==
Rank	Athlete	Time	Note
1st place, gold medalist(s)	Robert Korzeniowski (POL)	3:42.08	WL
2nd place, silver medalist(s)	Jesús Ángel García (ESP)	3:43.07	SB
3rd place, bronze medalist(s)	Edgar Hernández (MEX)	3:46.12	PB
4	Aigars Fadejevs (LAT)	3:46.20	
5	Vladimir Potemin (RUS)	3:46.53	
6	Valentí Massana (ESP)	3:48.28	
7	Curt Clausen (USA)	3:50.46	SB
8	Marco Giungi (ITA)	3:51.09	SB
9	Tomasz Lipiec (POL)	3:53.06	
10	Mike Trautmann (GER)	3:53.25	
11	Denis Langlois (FRA)	3:53.42	
12	David Boulanger (FRA)	3:53.52	
13	Francesco Galdenzi (ITA)	3:54.42	
14	Philip Dunn (USA)	3:56.33	PB
15	Mikel Odriozola (ESP)	3:57.17	
16	Spiridon Kastanis (GRE)	3:57.35	SB
17	Yoshimi Hara (JPN)	3:58.47	
18	Miloš Holuša (CZE)	3:58.54	
19	Tim Berrett (CAN)	3:59.34	
20	Sergey Korepanov (KAZ)	3:59.57	SB
21	Aleksandar Raković (YUG)	4:01.50	
22	Jacob Sørensen (DEN)	4:03.21	
23	Stefan Malik (SVK)	4:04.50	
24	Miguel Rodríguez (MEX)	4:06.45	
25	Jorge Costa (POR)	4:07.48	
26	Fredrik Svensson (SWE)	4:08.35	
27	René Piller (FRA)	4:10.54	
28	Jamie Costin (IRL)	4:11.58	
29	Fumio Imamura (JPN)	4:12.28	
30	Uģis Brūvelis (LAT)	4:22.02	
31	Arturo Huerta (CAN)	4:25.07	
DISQUALIFIED (DSQ)
—	Liam Murphy (AUS)	DSQ	
—	Roman Magdziarczyk (POL)	DSQ	
—	Pedro Martins (POR)	DSQ	
—	Darren Bown (AUS)	DSQ	
—	Modris Liepiņš (LAT)	DSQ	
—	Nikolay Matyukhin (RUS)	DSQ	
—	Nathan Deakes (AUS)	DSQ	
—	Bengt Bengtsson (SWE)	DSQ	
—	Daugvinas Zujus (LTU)	DSQ	
—	Denis Trautmann (GER)	DSQ	
DID NOT FINISH (DNF)
—	Aleksey Voyevodin (RUS)	DNF	
—	Giovanni De Benedictis (ITA)	DNF	
—	Trond Nymark (NOR)	DNF	
—	Craig Barrett (NZL)	DNF	
—	Omar Zepeda (MEX)	DNF	
—	Sándor Urbanik (HUN)	DNF	
—	Matej Spisiak (SVK)	DNF	
