= Kmenta =

Kmenta is a surname. Notable people with the surname include:

- František Kmenta (born 1958), Czech race walker
- Jan Kmenta (1926–2016), Czech-American economist
