= 1991 World Championships in Athletics – Men's 50 kilometres walk =

These are the official results of the Men's 50 km Walk event at the 1991 World Championships held on Saturday August 31, 1991, in Tokyo, Japan, with the start at 07:00h local time. There were a total number of 38 participating athletes.

Although just one gold medal was awarded, the silver medallist was given the same time as the gold medallist. As of 2024, this is the only time the men's 50 km walk was won by less than ten seconds at these championships. In 2022, the event was replaced with the 35 km walk.

== Medalists ==
Gold	Aleksandr Potashov; Soviet Union (URS)
Silver	Andrey Perlov; Soviet Union (URS)
Bronze	Hartwig Gauder; Germany (GER)

== Abbreviations ==
- All times shown are in hours:minutes:seconds

DNS	did not start
NM	no mark
WR	world record
WL	world leading
AR	area record
NR	national record
PB	personal best
SB	season best

== Final ==
RANK	FINAL	TIME
	Aleksandr Potashov (URS)	3:53:09
	Andrey Perlov (URS)	3:53:09
	Hartwig Gauder (GER)	3:55:14
4.	Vitaliy Popovich (URS)	4:00:10
5.	Valentin Kononen (FIN)	4:02:34
6.	Giuseppe De Gaetano (ITA)	4:03:43
7.	Fumio Imamura (JPN)	4:06:07
8.	René Piller (FRA)	4:06:30
9.	Godfried Dejonckheere (BEL)	4:07:44
10.	Les Morton (GBR)	4:09:18
11.	Martín Bermudez (MEX)	4:11:56
12.	Josep Marín (ESP)	4:13:19
13.	Tadahiro Kosaka (JPN)	4:13:32
14.	Gyula Dudás (HUN)	4:14:23
15.	Tim Berrett (CAN)	4:14:35
16.	Pavol Szikora (TCH)	4:14:59
17.	Jordi Llopart (ESP)	4:16:36
18.	Hubert Sonnek (TCH)	4:26:24
19.	Torsten Trampeli (GER)	4:27:23
20.	Jaroslav Makovec (TCH)	4:29:45
21.	Germán Sánchez (MEX)	4:34:41
22.	Paul Blagg (GBR)	4:35:22
23.	Takehiro Sonohara (JPN)	4:38:09
24.	Chris Maddocks (GBR)	4:39:15
—	Simon Baker (AUS)	DNF
—	Sandro Bellucci (ITA)	DNF
—	Martial Fesselier (FRA)	DNF
—	Robert Korzeniowski (POL)	DNF
—	Basilio Labrador (ESP)	DNF
—	Veijo Savikko (FIN)	DNF
—	Ronald Weigel (GER)	DNF
—	Bo Gustafsson (SWE)	DNF
—	Giovanni Perricelli (ITA)	DNF
—	Héctor Moreno (COL)	DNF
—	Carl Schueler (USA)	DNF
—	Antonio Kohler (BRA)	DNF
—	Enrique Vera (SWE)	DSQ
—	Rodrigo Serrano (MEX)	DSQ

== See also ==
- 1990 Men's European Championships 50km Walk (Split)
- 1992 Men's Olympic 50km Walk (Barcelona)
- 1993 Men's World Championships 50km Walk (Stuttgart)
