= Holuša =

Holuša (feminine: Holušová) is a Czech surname. Notable people with the surname include:

- Jakub Holuša (born 1988), Czech middle-distance runner
- Miloš Holuša (born 1965), Czech race walker
