= Athletics at the 1996 Summer Olympics – Men's 50 kilometres walk =

Men's 50 kilometres walk at the Games of the XXVI Olympiad
- Venue: Centennial Olympic Stadium
- Date: August 2
- Competitors: 52 from 27 nations
- Winning time: 3:43:30

Medalists
1st place, gold medalist(s)		Robert Korzeniowski; Poland
2nd place, silver medalist(s)		Mikhail Shchennikov; Russia
3rd place, bronze medalist(s)		Valentí Massana; Spain

These are the official results of the men's 50 km walk at the 1996 Summer Olympics in Atlanta, Georgia.

== Medalists ==
Gold	Robert Korzeniowski; Poland
Silver	Mikhail Shchennikov; Russia
Bronze	Valentí Massana; Spain

== Abbreviations ==
- All times shown are in hours:minutes:seconds

DNS	did not start
NM	no mark
OR	olympic record
WR	world record
AR	area record
NR	national record
PB	personal best
SB	season best

== Records ==
Standing records prior to the 1996 Summer Olympics
World Record	Andrey Perlov (URS)	3:37.41	August 5, 1989	Leningrad, Soviet Union
Olympic Record	Vyacheslav Ivanenko (URS)	3:38.29	September 30, 1988	Seoul, South Korea

== Results ==
RANK	FINAL	TIME
	Robert Korzeniowski (POL)	3'43:30
	Mikhail Shchennikov (RUS)	3'43:46
	Valentí Massana (ESP)	3'44:19
4.	Arturo Di Mezza (ITA)	3'44:52
5.	Viktor Ginko (BLR)	3'45:27
6.	Ignacio Zamudio (MEX)	3'46:07
7.	Valentin Kononen (FIN)	3'47:40
8.	Sergey Korepanov (KAZ)	3'48:42
9.	Daniel García (MEX)	3'50:05
10.	Tim Berrett (CAN)	3'51:28
11.	Aleksandar Raković (YUG)	3'51:31
12.	Axel Noack (GER)	3'51:55
13.	Giovanni Perricelli (ITA)	3'52:31
14.	Zhang Huiqiang (CHN)	3'53:10
15.	Thomas Wallstab (GER)	3'54:48
16.	Héctor Moreno (COL)	3'54:57
17.	Julio César Urías (GUA)	3'56:27
18.	Germán Sánchez (MEX)	3'57:47
19.	René Piller (FRA)	3'58:00
20.	Roman Mrazek (SVK)	3'58:20
21.	Štefan Malík (SVK)	3'58:40
22.	Jaime Barroso (ESP)	4'01:09
23.	Modris Liepiņš (LAT)	4'01:12
24.	Allen James (USA)	4'01:18
25.	Nikolay Matyukhin (RUS)	4'01:49
26.	Andrzej Chylinski (USA)	4'03:13
27.	Miloš Holuša (CZE)	4'03:16
28.	Martial Fesselier (FRA)	4'04:42
29.	Tadahiro Kosaka (JPN)	4'05:57
30.	Antero Lindman (FIN)	4'07:58
31.	Pascal Charrière (SUI)	4'10:20
32.	Peter Tichý (SVK)	4'10:55
33.	Craig Barrett (NZL)	4'15:15
34.	Chris Maddocks (GBR)	4'18:41
35.	Daugvinas Zujus (LTU)	4'23:35
36.	José Magalhaes (POR)	4'27:37
—	Jesús Ángel García (ESP)	DNF
—	Duane Cousins (AUS)	DNF
—	Giovanni De Benedictis (ITA)	DNF
—	Yevgeniy Misyulya (BLR)	DNF
—	Jani Lehtinen (FIN)	DNF
—	Vitaliy Popovych (UKR)	DNF
—	Andrey Plotnikov (RUS)	DNF
—	Ronald Weigel (GER)	DNF
—	Hubert Sonnek (CZE)	DNF
—	Thierry Toutain (FRA)	DSQ
—	Simon Baker (AUS)	DSQ
—	Hugo López (GUA)	DSQ
—	Mao Xinyuan (CHN)	DSQ
—	Zhao Yongsheng (CHN)	DSQ
—	Herman Nelson (USA)	DSQ
—	Fedosei Ciumacenco (MDA)	DNS

== See also ==
- 1996 Race Walking Year Ranking
