= Athletics at the 2000 Summer Olympics – Men's 50 kilometres walk =

Men's 50 kilometres walk at the Games of the XXVII Olympiad
- Venue: Stadium Australia
- Date: 29 September
- Competitors: 56 from 28 nations
- Winning time: 3:42:22

Medalists
1st place, gold medalist(s)		Robert Korzeniowski; Poland
2nd place, silver medalist(s)		Aigars Fadejevs; Latvia
3rd place, bronze medalist(s)		Joel Sánchez; Mexico

The Men's 50 km race walk event at the 2000 Summer Olympics took place on Friday 29 September 2000 in Sydney, Australia, starting at 08:00h

== Medalists ==
Gold	Robert Korzeniowski; Poland
Silver	Aigars Fadejevs; Latvia
Bronze	Joel Sánchez; Mexico

== Abbreviations ==
- All times shown are in hours:minutes:seconds

DNS	did not start
NM	no mark
OR	olympic record
WR	world record
AR	area record
NR	national record
PB	personal best
SB	season best

== Records ==
Standing records prior to the 2000 Summer Olympics
World Record	Valeriy Spitsyn (RUS)	3:37.26	21 May 2000	Moscow, Russia
Olympic Record	Vyacheslav Ivanenko (URS)	3:38.29	30 September 1988	Seoul, South Korea

== Results ==
Place	Athlete	Nation	Time	Record
1st place, gold medalist(s)	Robert Korzeniowski	Poland	3:42:22	
2nd place, silver medalist(s)	Aigars Fadejevs	Latvia	3:43:40	
3rd place, bronze medalist(s)	Joel Sanchez	Mexico	3:44:36	PB
4	Valentí Massana	Spain	3:46:01	
5	Nikolay Matyukhin	Russia	3:46:37	
6	Nathan Deakes	Australia	3:47:29	PB
7	Miguel Angel Rodriguez	Mexico	3:48:12	
8	Roman Magdziarczyk	Poland	3:48:17	PB
9	Modris Liepins	Latvia	3:48:36	
10	Yang Yongjian	China	3:48:42	PB
11	Aleksandar Raković	FR Yugoslavia	3:49:16	SB
12	Jesus Angel Garcia	Spain	3:49:31	
13	Wang Yinhang	China	3:50:19	PB
14	Denis Langlois	France	3:52:56	
15	Sergey Korepanov	Kazakhstan	3:53:30	
16	Milos Holusa	Czech Republic	3:53:48	SB
17	Peter Tichy	Slovakia	3:54:47	
18	Craig Barrett	New Zealand	3:55:53	
19	Mike Trautmann	Germany	3:56:19	
20	Stefan Malik	Slovakia	3:56:44	SB
21	Denis Trautmann	Germany	3:58:18	
22	Curt Clausen	United States	3:58:39	
23	Peter Korcok	Slovakia	3:58:46	
24	Mikel Odriozola	Spain	3:59:50	
25	Valeriy Borisov	Kazakhstan	4:01:11	
26	Vladimir Potemin	Russia	4:02:38	
27	Dion Russell	Australia	4:02:50	
28	Philip Dunn	United States	4:03:05	SB
29	Sylvain Caudron	France	4:03:22	
30	Daugvinas Zujus	Lithuania	4:06:04	
31	Andrew Hermann	United States	4:07:18	
32	Oleksiy Shelest	Ukraine	4:07:39	
33	Pedro Martins	Portugal	4:08:13	
34	Duane Cousins	Australia	4:10:43	
35	Ugis Bruvelis	Latvia	4:11:41	
36	Fumio Imamura	Japan	4:13:28	
37	Gyula Dudás	Hungary	4:17:55	
38	Jamie Costin	Ireland	4:24:22	
39	Chris Maddocks	Great Britain	4:52:12	
	Ivano Brugnetti	Italy	DNF	
	Robert Ihly	Germany	DNF	
	Spyridon Kastanis	Greece	DNF	
	Tomasz Lipiec	Poland	DNF	
	Giovanni Perricelli	Italy	DNF	
	René Piller	France	DNF	
	Valeriy Spitsyn	Russia	DNF	
	Theodoros Stamatopoulos	Greece	DNF	
	Arturo Di Mezza	Italy	DNF	
	Tim Berrett	Canada	DQ	
	Fedosei Ciumacenco	Moldova	DQ	
	Zoltán Czukor	Hungary	DQ	
	Viktor Ginko	Belarus	DQ	
	Arturo Huerta	Canada	DQ	
	Akihiko Koike	Japan	DQ	
	Valentin Kononen	Finland	DQ	
	Germán Sánchez	Mexico	DQ	

== See also ==
- 2000 Race Walking Year Ranking
