= 2003 World Championships in Athletics – Men's 50 kilometres walk =

Video on YouTube Official video

The Men's 50 km Walk event at the 2003 World Championships in Paris, France was held on Wednesday August 27, 2003, with the start at 07:50h local time.

== Medalists ==
| Gold | Robert Korzeniowski; Poland (POL) |
| Silver | German Skurygin; Russia (RUS) |
| Bronze | Andreas Erm; Germany (GER) |

== Abbreviations ==
- All times shown are in hours:minutes:seconds

| DNS | did not start |
| DSQ | disqualified |
| NM | no mark |
| WR | world record |
| WL | world leading |
| AR | area record |
| NR | national record |
| PB | personal best |
| SB | season best |

== Final ranking ==
| Rank | Athlete | Time | Note |
|---|---|---|---|
| 1st place, gold medalist(s) | Robert Korzeniowski (POL) | 3:36:03 | WL |
| 2nd place, silver medalist(s) | German Skurygin (RUS) | 3:36:42 | NR |
| 3rd place, bronze medalist(s) | Andreas Erm (GER) | 3:37:46 | NR |
| 4 | Aleksey Voyevodin (RUS) | 3:38:01 | PB |
| 5 | Denis Nizhegorodov (RUS) | 3:38:23 | PB |
| 6 | Jesús Ángel García (ESP) | 3:43:56 | SB |
| 7 | Roman Magdziarczyk (POL) | 3:44:53 | PB |
| 8 | Trond Nymark (NOR) | 3:46:14 | PB |
| 9 | Sergey Korepanov (KAZ) | 3:47:42 | SB |
| 10 | Denis Langlois (FRA) | 3:49:05 | SB |
| 11 | Eddy Riva (FRA) | 3:53:18 | PB |
| 12 | Germán Sánchez (MEX) | 3:53:24 | SB |
| 13 | Peter Korčok (SVK) | 3:54:12 | SB |
| 14 | Mikel Odriozola (ESP) | 3:56:27 | |
| 15 | Fredrik Svensson (SWE) | 3:56:31 | PB |
| 16 | Spiridon Kastanis (GRE) | 3:56:41 | SB |
| 17 | Pedro Martins (POR) | 3:58:10 | |
| 18 | Bengt Bengtsson (SWE) | 3:58:36 | |
| 19 | Tim Berrett (CAN) | 4:02:03 | SB |
DISQUALIFIED (DSQ)
| — | Fumio Imamura (JPN) | DSQ | |
| — | Milos Holusa (CZE) | DSQ | |
| — | Modris Liepins (LAT) | DSQ | |
| — | Craig Barrett (NZL) | DSQ | |
| — | Tomasz Lipiec (POL) | DSQ | |
| — | Peter Tichy (SVK) | DSQ | |
| — | Curt Clausen (USA) | DSQ | |
| — | Yu Chaohong (CHN) | DSQ | |
| — | Aigars Fadejevs (LAT) | DSQ | |
| — | Jacob Sørensen (DEN) | DSQ | |
| — | Marco Giungi (ITA) | DSQ | |
| — | Grzegorz Sudoł (POL) | DSQ | |
| — | Janos Tóth (HUN) | DSQ | |
| — | Bian Aiguo (CHN) | DSQ | |
| — | Wang Yinhang (CHN) | DSQ | |
DID NOT FINISH (DNF)
| — | Francisco Pinardo (ESP) | DNF | |
| — | Jamie Costin (IRL) | DNF | |
| — | Luis Fernando García (GUA) | DNF | |
| — | Aleksandar Raković (SCG) | DNF | |
| — | Miguel Ángel Rodríguez (MEX) | DNF | |

== See also ==
- Athletics at the 2003 Pan American Games - Men's 50 kilometres walk
