= Oleg Ishutkin =

Russian racewalker

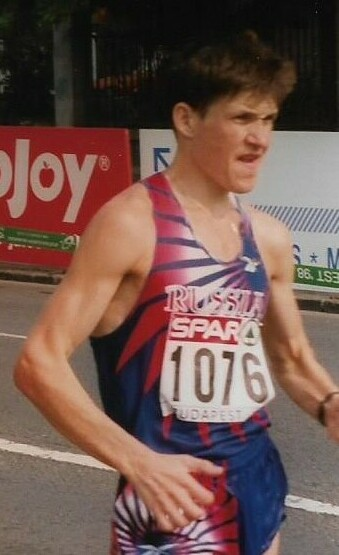
Ishutkin competing in the 1998 European Championships in Budapest

Oleg Ishutkin (born 22 July 1975) is a retired Russian race walker. He represented his native country at the 1997 World Championships in Athletics and just missed out on a medal, finishing fourth in the men's 50 km race. Among his other achievements was a silver medal from the 50 km walk at the 1997 IAAF World Race Walking Cup.

== International competitions ==
Representing Russia
Year	Competition	Venue	Position	Event	Notes
1994	World Junior Championships	Lisbon, Portugal	7th	10,000m	41:46.30
1997	World Race Walking Cup	Poděbrady, Czech Republic	2nd	50 km	3:40:12
1997	World Championships	Athens, Greece	4th	50 km	3:50:04
1998	European Championships	Budapest, Hungary	—	50 km	DQ
2000	European Race Walking Cup	Eisenhüttenstadt, Germany	39th	50 km	4:17:43
