= Aleksey Voyevodin =

Russian race walker

Medal record
Men's athletics
Representing Russia
Olympic Games
| Bronze medal – third place | 2004 Athens | 50 km walk |
World Championships
| Silver medal – second place | 2005 Helsinki | 50 km walk |
European Championships
| Silver medal – second place | 2002 Munich | 50 km walk |
World Race Walking Cup
| Gold medal – first place | 2002 Turin | 50 km walk |
| Gold medal – first place | 2004 Naumburg | 50 km walk |

Aleksey Nikolayevich Voyevodin (Russian: Алексей Николаевич Воеводин) (born 9 August 1970 near Penza) is a Russian race walker mainly competing over the 50 km distance. He has one World Championships silver medal, and won a bronze medal at the 2004 Summer Olympics.

On 5 August 2008, Voyevodin and training partners Sergey Morozov, Viktor Burayev, and Vladimir Kanaykin, all coached by Viktor Chegin, were banned from competition, following a positive EPO test. The positive tests were conducted in April 2008 and evidenced systematic doping.

Since 1992, Voyevodin is studying at the Penza State University's Faculty of Institute of Physical Education

== International competitions ==
Representing Russia
| Year | Competition | Venue | Position | Event | Notes |
|---|---|---|---|---|---|
| 1995 | World Race Walking Cup | Beijing, China | 10th | 50 km | |
| 1995 | World Championships | Gothenburg, Sweden | 15th | 50 km | |
| 1997 | World Championships | Athens, Greece | 10th | 50 km | |
| 2000 | European Race Walking Cup | Eisenhüttenstadt, Germany | 31st | 50 km | 4:10:40 |
| 2001 | European Race Walking Cup | Dudince, Slovakia | 6th | 50 km | 3:48:51 |
| 2001 | World Championships | Edmonton, Canada | — | 50 km | DNF |
| 2002 | European Championships | Munich, Germany | 2nd | 50 km | |
| 2002 | World Race Walking Cup | Turin, Italy | 1st | 50 km | |
| 2003 | European Race Walking Cup | Cheboksary, Russia | 2nd | 50 km | |
| 2003 | World Championships | Paris, France | 4th | 50 km | |
| 2004 | World Race Walking Cup | Naumburg, Germany | 1st | 50 km | |
| 2004 | Olympic Games | Athens, Greece | 3rd | 50 km | |
| 2005 | European Race Walking Cup | Miskolc, Hungary | 1st | 50 km | |
| 2005 | World Championships | Helsinki, Finland | 2nd | 50 km | |
| 2007 | World Championships | Osaka, Japan | — | 50 km | DNF |

== See also ==
- List of doping cases in athletics
