= Vitaliy Popovich =

Ukrainian racewalker

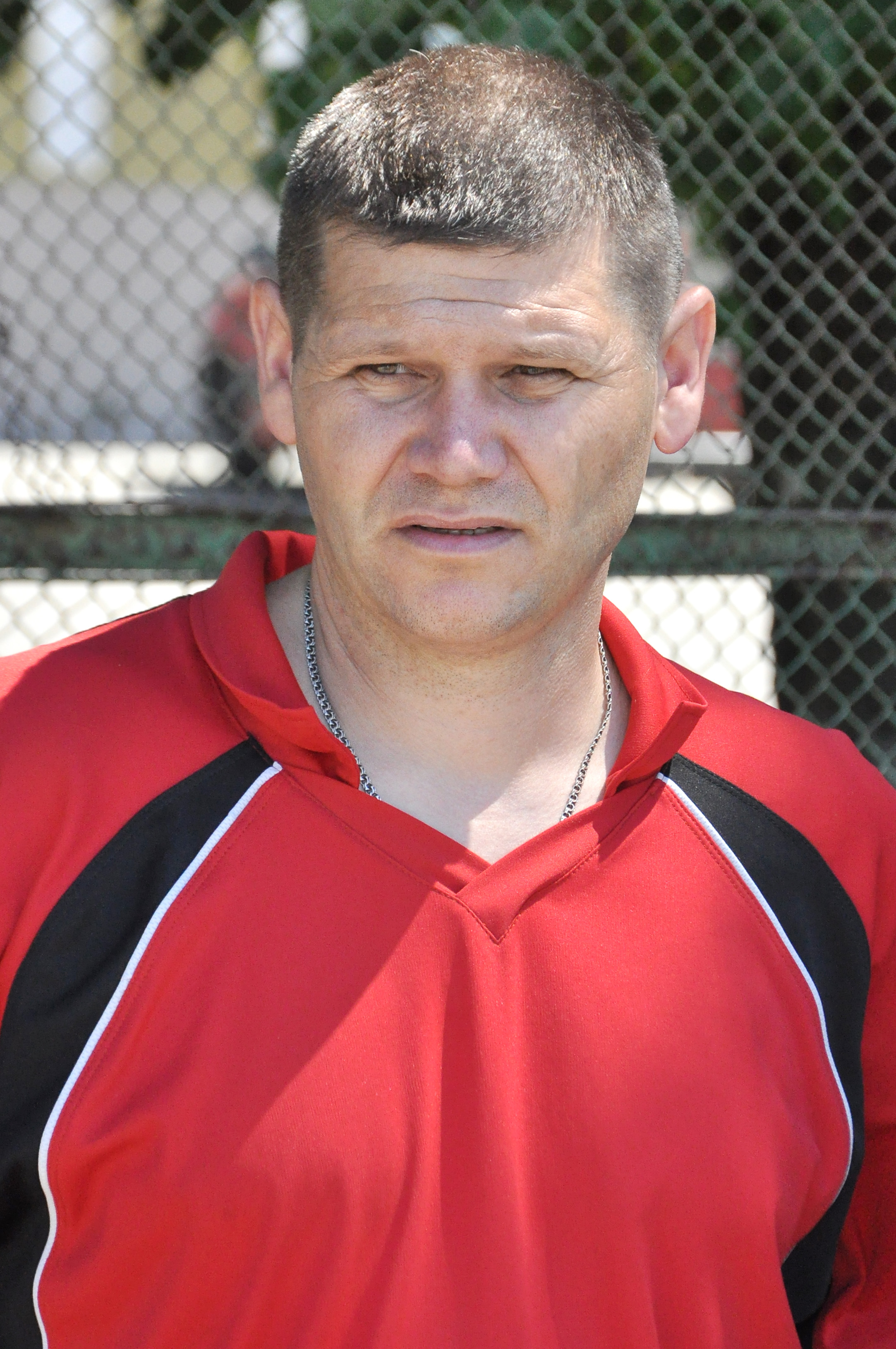
Vitaliy Popovich

Vitaliy Popovich (Ukrainian: Віталій Попович; 22 October 1962 – 7 September 2000) was a Ukrainian male former racewalking athlete who competed in the 50 kilometres race walk. He competed in the men's 50 kilometres walk at the 1988 Summer Olympics, representing the Soviet Union, and in the same event at the 1996 Summer Olympics, representing Ukraine. He was a three-time participant at the World Championships in Athletics, with a best of fourth at the 1991 event. He also competed at five straight editions of the IAAF World Race Walking Cup from 1989 to 1997. He set a personal best of 3:43:57 hours for the distance in 1989.

At national level, he won one Soviet title in 1991 and, after the dissolution of the Soviet Union, took four 50 km walk titles at the Ukrainian Athletics Championships. On the professional circuit, he was the 1996 winner at the Dudinská Päťdesiatka.

Popovich committed suicide on 7 September 2000.

== International competitions ==
Year	Competition	Venue	Position	Event	Notes
1986	Goodwill Games	Moscow, Soviet Union	—	20 km walk	DNF
1988	Olympic Games	Seoul, South Korea	26th	50 km walk	3:59:23
1989	World Race Walking Cup	Barcelona, Spain	6th	50 km walk	3:49:48
1989	World Race Walking Cup	Barcelona, Spain	1st	Team	585 pts
1991	World Race Walking Cup	San Jose, United States	—	50 km walk	DQ
1991	World Championships	Tokyo, Japan	4th	50 km walk	4:00:10
1993	World Race Walking Cup	Monterrey, Mexico	—	50 km walk	DNF
1993	World Championships	Stuttgart, Germany	—	50 km walk	DQ
1995	World Race Walking Cup	Beijing, China	14th	50 km walk	3:51:53
1995	World Race Walking Cup	Beijing, China	13th	Team	333 pts
1995	World Championships	Gothenburg, Sweden	—	50 km walk	DQ
1996	Olympic Games	Atlanta, United States	—	50 km walk	DNF
1997	World Race Walking Cup	Poděbrady, Czech Republic	—	50 km walk	DNF
1998	European Race Walking Cup	Dudince, Slovakia	—	50 km walk	DQ
2000	European Race Walking Cup	Eisenhüttenstadt, Germany	32nd	50 km walk	4:10:40

== National titles ==
- Soviet Athletics Championships
  - 50 km walk: 1991
- Ukrainian Athletics Championships
  - 50 km walk: 1993, 1994, 1995, 1997
