= Giuseppe De Gaetano =

Italian race walker (born 1966)

Personal information
- Nationality: Italian
- Born: 4 October 1966 (age 59) Padua

Sport
- Country: Italy
- Sport: Athletics
- Event: Race walk
Medal record
World Race Walking Cup
Gold medal – first place	1991 San Josè	Combined Team
Silver medal – second place	1993 Monterrey	20 km Team
Silver medal – second place	1995 Beijing	Combined Team
Bronze medal – third place	1993 Monterrey	Combined Team

Giuseppe De Gaetano (born 4 October 1966) is a retired male race walker from Italy.

== Biography ==
He competed for his native country at the 1992 Summer Olympics, finishing in 12th place in the men's 50 km walk event. De Gaetano set his personal best (3:51.54) in the men's 50 km walk event in 1993. He was the son of the Italian Olympic racewalker (Rome 1960) Antonio De Gaetano.

== Achievements ==
Year	Competition	Venue	Position	Event	Notes
1989	World Race Walking Cup	L'Hospitalet, Spain	16th	50 km	3:58:22
1991	World Race Walking Cup	San Jose, United States	9th	50 km	3:55:45
1991	World Championships	Tokyo, Japan	6th	50 km	4:03:43
1992	Olympic Games	Barcelona, Spain	12th	50 km	3:59:13
1993	World Race Walking Cup	Monterrey, Mexico	9th	50 km	4:00:19
1994	European Championships	Helsinki, Finland	—	50 km	DQ

== See also ==
- Italy at the IAAF World Race Walking Cup
