= Basilio Labrador =

Spanish racewalker

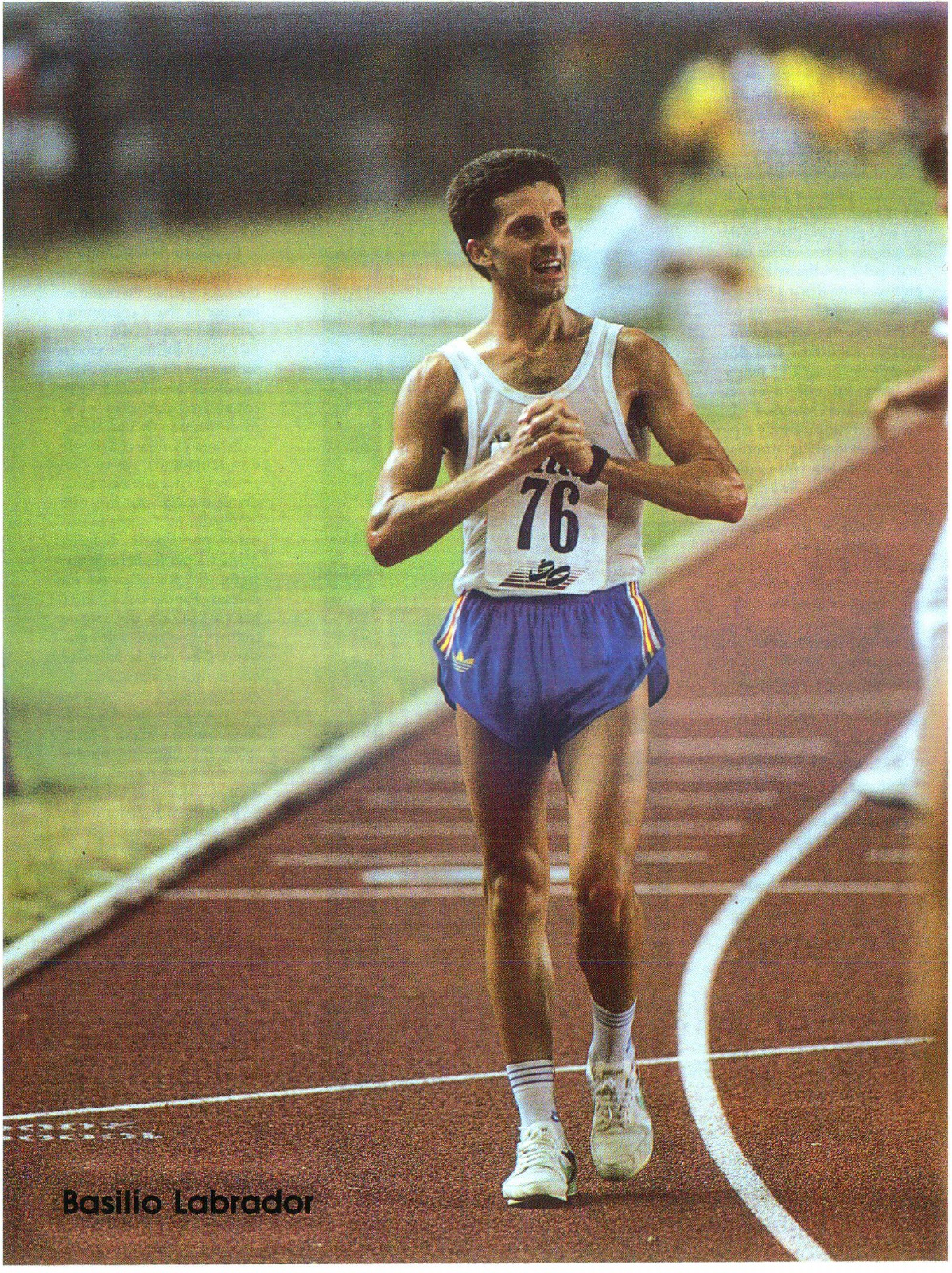
Basilio Labrador compitiendo

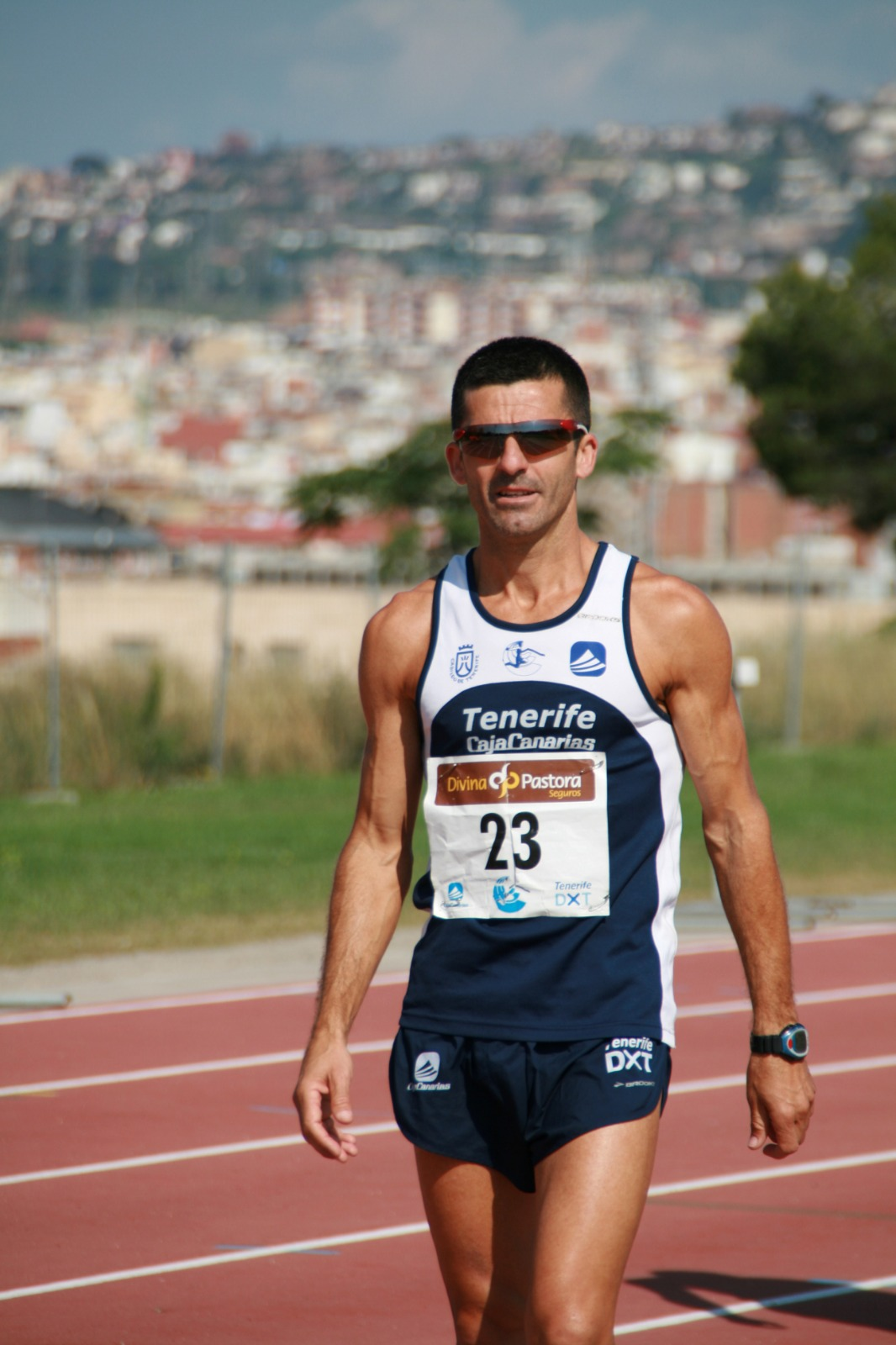
Basilio Labrador

Basilio Labrador (born 29 March 1967) is a Spanish male former racewalking athlete. He competed mainly in the 50 kilometres race walk but later in his career moved towards 20 kilometres race walk. He set his personal best over 50 km at the 1993 World Championships in Athletics, where he placed fifth with 3:46:46 hours. His 20 km best of 1:32:31 hours was achieved in Jerez de la Frontera in 2003.

He was a five-time participant for Spain at the IAAF World Race Walking Cup, and twice competed at the European Athletics Championships, managing fourth at the 1990 event. Born in Los Realejos, he took up walking at the age of fifteen. He later studied physical education at the Universidad de La Laguna and earned a masters in sports governance.

== International competitions ==
Year	Competition	Venue	Position	Event	Notes
1989	World Race Walking Cup	Barcelona, Spain	19th	50 km walk	3:59:51
1990	European Championships	Split, Yugoslavia	4th	50 km walk	4:02:05
1991	World Race Walking Cup	San Jose, United States	23rd	50 km walk	4:03:42
1991	World Championships	Tokyo, Japan	—	50 km walk	DNF
1992	Ibero-American Championships	Seville, Spain	7th	20 km walk	1:28:26.7
1993	World Race Walking Cup	Monterrey, Mexico	15th	50 km walk	4:04:35
1993	World Championships	Stuttgart, Germany	5th	50 km walk	3:46:46
1994	European Championships	Helsinki, Finland	17th	50 km walk	3:58:58
1995	World Race Walking Cup	Beijing, China	39th	50 km walk	4:05:36
1996	European Race Walking Cup	A Coruña, Spain	4th	50 km walk	3:56:32
1998	European Race Walking Cup	Dudince, Slovakia	5th	50 km walk	3:47:28
1999	World Race Walking Cup	Mézidon-Canon, France	16th	50 km walk	3:48:55
