= Zhang Huiqiang =

Chinese racewalker

Personal information
- Nationality: Chinese
- Born: 14 October 1976 (age 49)

Sport
- Sport: Athletics
- Event: Racewalking

Zhang Huiqiang (simplified Chinese: 张会强; traditional Chinese: 張會強; pinyin: Zhāng Huìqiáng; born 14 October 1976) is a Chinese racewalker. He competed in the men's 50 kilometres walk at the 1996 Summer Olympics.
