= René Piller =

French racewalker

René Piller (born 23 April 1965 in Héricourt, Haute-Saône) is a retired male race walker from France, who competed in three Summer Olympics during his career.

== Achievements ==
Year	Competition	Venue	Position	Event	Notes
Representing France
1989	World Race Walking Cup	L'Hospitalet, Spain	12th	50 km	3:56:06
1989	Jeux de la Francophonie	Casablanca, Morocco	4th	20 km	1:35:27
1990	European Championships	Split, Yugoslavia	12th	50 km	4:05:39
1991	World Race Walking Cup	San Jose, United States	10th	50 km	3:55:48
1991	World Championships	Tokyo, Japan	8th	50 km	4:06:30
1992	Olympic Games	Barcelona, Spain	15th	50 km	4:02:40
1993	World Race Walking Cup	Monterrey, Mexico	12th	50 km	4:02:33
1993	World Championships	Stuttgart, Germany	6th	50 km	3:48:57
1994	European Championships	Helsinki, Finland	—	50 km	DQ
1995	World Race Walking Cup	Beijing, PR China	7th	50 km	3:45:56
1995	World Championships	Gothenburg, Sweden	8th	50 km	3:49:47
1996	Olympic Games	Atlanta, U.S.	19th	50 km	3:58:00
1997	World Championships	Athens, Greece	11th	50 km	3:55:06
1998	European Championships	Budapest, Hungary	9th	50 km	3:51:03
1999	World Championships	Seville, Spain	9th	50 km	3:56:39
2000	European Race Walking Cup	Eisenhüttenstadt, Germany	4th	50 km	3:47:49
2000	Olympic Games	Sydney, Australia	—	50 km	DNF
2001	European Race Walking Cup	Dudince, Slovakia	11th	50 km	3:52:18
2001	World Championships	Edmonton, Canada	27th	50 km	4:10:54
2002	European Championships	Munich, Germany	18th	50 km	4:07:20
