= Trond Nymark =

Norwegian race walker (born 1976)

Personal information
- Born: 28 December 1976 (age 49) Bergen, Norway

Sport
- Country: Norway
- Sport: Athletics
- Event: 50km Race Walk
Medal record
World Championships
Gold medal – first place	2009 Berlin	50 km walk

Trond Nymark (born 28 December 1976) is a Norwegian race walker. He was born in Bergen and represents TIF Viking.

== Achievements ==
Year	Competition	Venue	Position	Event	Notes
Representing Norway
1997	World Race Walking Cup	Poděbrady, Czech Republic	88th	20 km	1:28:15
1997	European U23 Championships	Turku, Finland	14th	20 km	1:29:44
1998	European Championships	Budapest, Hungary	19th	50 km	4:02:33
1999	World Race Walking Cup	Mézidon-Canon, France	39th	50 km	3:55:31
1999	World Championships	Seville, Spain	—	50 km	DNF
2000	European Race Walking Cup	Eisenhüttenstadt, Germany	10th	50 km	3:53:24
2001	World Championships	Edmonton, Canada	—	50 km	DNF
2002	European Championships	Munich, Germany	5th	50 km	3:50:16
2002	World Race Walking Cup	Turin, Italy	36th	20 km	1:29:16
2003	World Championships	Paris, France	8th	50 km	3:46:14
2004	Olympic Games	Athens, Greece	13th	50 km	3:53:20
2004	World Race Walking Cup	Naumburg, Germany	16th	50 km	3:57:11
2005	World Championships	Helsinki, Finland	4th	50 km	3:44:04
2006	World Race Walking Cup	A Coruña, Spain	2nd	50 km	3:41:30
2006	European Championships	Gothenburg, Sweden	4th	50 km	3:44:17
2007	European Race Walking Cup	Leamington Spa, United Kingdom	2nd	50 km	3:41:31
2007	World Championships	Osaka, Japan	8th	50 km	3:57:22
2008	World Race Walking Cup	Cheboksary, Russia	3rd	50 km	3:44:59
2008	Olympic Games	Beijing, China	—	50 km	DNF
2009	European Race Walking Cup	Metz, France	—	20 km	DNF
2009	World Championships	Berlin, Germany	1st	50 km	3:41:16 =PB/NR
2010	European Championships	Barcelona, Spain	—	50 km	DNF
2011	European Race Walking Cup	Olhão, Portugal	—	50 km	DNF
2011	World Championships	Daegu, South Korea	17th	50 km	3:54:26
2012	Olympic Games	London, United Kingdom	20th	50 km	3:48:37

== General references ==
- Trond Nymark at World Athletics
- Trond Nymark at Olympedia
- Trond Nymark at Olympics at Sports-Reference.com (archived)
