= Zhao Yongsheng =

Chinese race walker

Zhao Yongsheng (simplified Chinese: 赵永胜; traditional Chinese: 趙永勝; pinyin: Zhào Yǒngshèng; born April 16, 1970, in Jinzhou, Liaoning) is a retired male race walker from PR China. He competed for his native country at the 1996 Summer Olympics.

== Achievements ==
Year	Competition	Venue	Position	Notes
Representing China
1995	World Race Walking Cup	Beijing, PR China	1st	50 km
1995	World Championships	Gothenburg, Sweden	DNF	50 km
1996	Olympic Games	Atlanta, Georgia, United States	DSQ	50 km
1997	World Championships	Athens, Greece	DNF	50 km
