= František Kmenta =

Czech racewalker (born 1958)

František Kmenta (born 5 October 1958) is a retired Czech race walker.

He competed at the IAAF World Race Walking Cup in 1997 and 1999, but finished lowly. He became Czech champion in 2001 (50 km).
