= Giovanni Perricelli =

Italian race walker (born 1967)

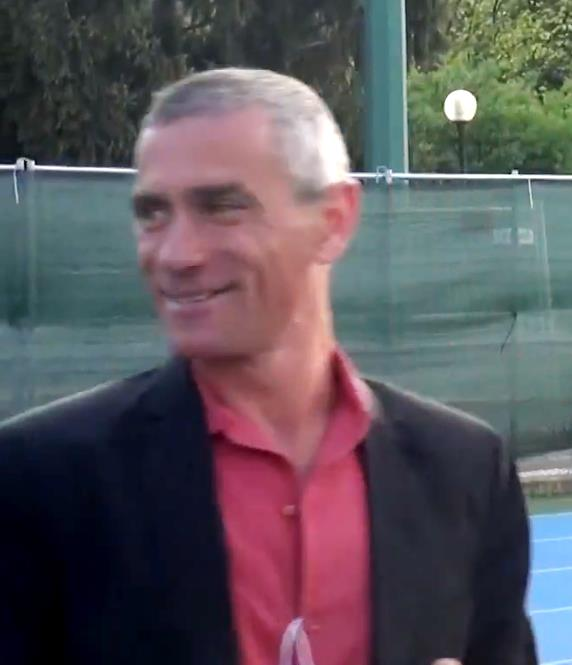
- Perricelli in 2015 at 48.

Personal information
- Nationality: Italian
- Born: 25 August 1967 (age 59) Milan, Italy
- Height: 1.75 m (5 ft 9 in)
- Weight: 70 kg (154 lb)

Sport
- Country: Italy
- Sport: Athletics
- Event: Racewalking
- Club: G.S. Fiamme Azzurre

Achievements and titles
- Personal bests: 20 km: 1:21.37 (1991); 50 km: 3:43.95 (1994)
Medal record
Men's athletics
Representing Italy
European Championships
Bronze medal – third place	1994 Helsinki	50 km walk
World Race Walking Cup
Gold medal – first place	1991 San Josè	Combined Team
Silver medal – second place	1993 Monterrey	20 km Team
Silver medal – second place	1995 Beijing	20 km Team
Silver medal – second place	1995 Beijing	Combined Team
Bronze medal – third place	1993 Monterrey	Combined Team
Summer Universiade
Silver medal – second place	1995 Fukuoka	10 km walk

Giovanni "Gianni" Perricelli (born 25 August 1967 in Milan) is an Italian race walker who competed at four editions of Olympic Games: 1988 Summer Olympics, 1992 Summer Olympics, 1996 Summer Olympics, 2000 Summer Olympics,

== Achievements ==
Year	Competition	Venue	Position	Event	Notes
1988	Olympic Games	Seoul, South Korea	11th	50 km	3:47:14
1990	European Championships	Split, Yugoslavia	7th	50 km	4:03:36
1991	World Race Walking Cup	San Jose, United States	5th	50 km	3:52:51
1991	World Championships	Tokyo, Japan	—	50 km	DNF
1992	Olympic Games	Barcelona, Spain	—	50 km	DNF
1993	World Race Walking Cup	Monterrey, Mexico	10th	20 km	1:26:17
1993	World Championships	Stuttgart, Germany	13th	50 km	3:54:30
1994	European Championships	Helsinki, Finland	6th	20 km	1:21:51
1994	European Championships	Helsinki, Finland	3rd	50 km	3:43:55
1995	World Championships	Gothenburg, Sweden	2nd	50 km	3:45:11
1996	Olympic Games	Atlanta, United States	16th	20 km	1:23:41
1996	Olympic Games	Atlanta, United States	13th	50 km	3:52:31
1997	World Championships	Athens, Greece	14th	50 km	3:57:38
1998	European Race Walking Cup	Dudince, Slovakia	3rd	50 km	3:44:17
1998	European Championships	Budapest, Hungary	—	50 km	DNF
1999	World Championships	Seville, Spain	—	50 km	DNF
2000	Olympic Games	Sydney, Australia	—	50 km	DNF

== See also ==
- Italian all-time lists - 50 km walk
