= Andrzej Chylinski =

American racewalker

Personal information
- Born: December 5, 1960 (age 65) New York City, United States
- Height: 1.88 m (6 ft 2 in)
- Weight: 75 kg (165 lb)

Sport
- Sport: Athletics
- Event: Racewalking

Andrzej Chylinski (born December 5, 1960) is an American racewalker. He competed in the men's 50 kilometres walk at the 1996 Summer Olympics.

== Personal bests ==
- 50 kilometres walk – 3:58:39 (1995)
