= Andrey Plotnikov =

Russian race walker

Medal record

Men's athletics

Representing Russia

European Championships
Bronze medal – third place	1998 Budapest	50 km walk

Andrey Plotnikov (Russian: Андрей Плотников, born 12 August 1967) is a Russian race walker, who won the bronze medal in the 50 km race at the 1998 European Championships. He represented his native country at the 1996 Summer Olympics in Atlanta, Georgia.

== International competitions ==
Year	Competition	Venue	Position	Event	Notes
Representing the Soviet Union
1990	European Championships	Split, Yugoslavia	—	50 km	DQ
1991	World Race Walking Cup	San Jose, United States	16th	20 km	1:22:29
Representing Russia
1993	World Race Walking Cup	Monterrey, Mexico	35th	50 km	4:14:45
1994	European Championships	Helsinki, Finland	8th	50 km	3:47:43
1995	World Race Walking Cup	Beijing, China	29th	50 km	4:02:09
1997	World Race Walking Cup	Poděbrady, Czech Republic	10th	50 km	3:48:35
1998	European Championships	Budapest, Hungary	3rd	50 km	3:45:53
1999	World Race Walking Cup	Mézidon-Canon, France	—	50 km	DNF
2000	European Race Walking Cup	Eisenhüttenstadt, Germany	—	50 km	DNF
