= German Skurygin =

Russian racewalker

German Anatolyevich Skurygin (Russian: Герман Анатольевич Скурыгин; September 15, 1963 – November 28, 2008) was a Russian race walker. He was born in Vutno.

He originally won a gold medal at the 1999 World Championships, but later lost it due to doping. He was suspended from 1999 to 2001. Like dozens of other elite Russian race walkers suspended for doping, he was coached by Viktor Chegin. He died of a heart attack at 45.

== International competitions ==
Year	Competition	Venue	Position	Event	Notes
Representing Russia
1993	World Championships	Stuttgart, Germany	22nd	50 km	4:04:27
1994	European Championships	Helsinki, Finland	6th	50 km	3:46:30
1995	World Race Walking Cup	Beijing, China	18th	50 km	3:54:48
1999	World Race Walking Cup	Mézidon-Canon, France	5th	50 km	3:40:54
1999	World Championships	Seville, Spain	—	50 km	DSQ
2002	European Championships	Munich, Germany	4th	50 km	3:48:58
2002	World Race Walking Cup	Turin, Italy	2nd	50 km	3:42:08
2003	European Race Walking Cup	Cheboksary, Russia	1st	50 km	3:47:50
2003	World Championships	Paris, France	2nd	50 km	3:36:42
2004	World Race Walking Cup	Naumburg, Germany	4th	50 km	3:49:28

== See also ==
- List of doping cases in athletics
