= Valentin Kononen =

Finnish race walker (born 1969)

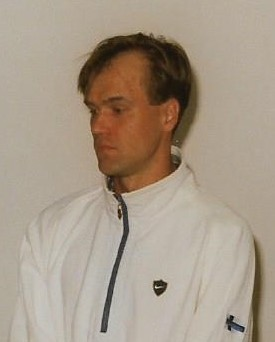

Personal information
- Born: 7 March 1969 (age 57) Helsinki, Finland
Medal record
Men's athletics
Representing Finland
World Championships
Gold medal – first place	1995 Gothenburg	50 km walk
Silver medal – second place	1993 Stuttgart	50 km walk
European Championships
Silver medal – second place	1998 Budapest	50 km walk

Valentin Kononen (born 7 March 1969) is a Finnish former race walker. His competitive accomplishments include winning several medals in major competitions, which ranks him as one of the top Finnish performer in his sport.

Kononen's most notable achievement was winning a gold medal in the 1995 World Championships in Athletics in Gothenburg. He also won silver medals in the 1993 World Championships in Stuttgart and the 1998 European Championships in Budapest.

== Fastest 50km race results ==
- 3.39.34 (1) Dudince 26 March 2000
- 3.41.09 (3) Poděbrady 20 April 1997 (World Race Walking Cup)
- 3.42.02 (2) Stuttgart 21 August 1993 (World Championships)
- 3.42.50 (3) Beijing 30 April 1995
- 3.43.42 (1) Gothenburg 11 August 1995
- 3.44.28 (2) Budapest 21 August 1998 (European Championships)
- 3.45.19 (2) Naumburg 28 April 1996
- 3.47.14 (7) Helsinki 13 August 1994 (European Championships)
- 3.47.40 (7) Atlanta 2 August 1996 (Olympic Games)
- 3.48.50 (9) Dudince 25 April 1998

== Achievements ==
Year	Competition	Venue	Position	Event	Notes
Representing Finland
1990	European Championships	Split, Yugoslavia	6th	50 km	4:03:07
1991	World Championships	Tokyo, Japan	5th	50 km	4:02:34
1992	Olympic Games	Barcelona, Spain	7th	50 km	3:57:21
1993	World Race Walking Cup	Monterrey, Mexico	6th	50 km	3:57:28
1993	World Championships	Stuttgart, Germany		50 km	3:42:02
1994	European Championships	Helsinki, Finland	7th	50 km	3:47:14
1995	World Race Walking Cup	Beijing, PR China	3rd	50 km	3:42:50
1995	World Championships	Gothenburg, Sweden		50 km	3:43:42
1996	Olympic Games	Atlanta, United States	7th	50 km	3:47:40
1997	World Championships	Athens, Greece	9th	50 km	3:53:40
1998	European Championships	Budapest, Hungary		50 km	3:44:28
1999	World Championships	Seville, Spain	—	50 km	DNF
2000	Olympic Games	Sydney, Australia	—	50 km	DSQ
