= 1993 World Championships in Athletics – Men's 50 kilometres walk =

These are the official results of the Men's 50 km Walk event at the 1993 World Championships held on Saturday August 21, 1993, in Stuttgart, Germany. There were a total number of 46 participating athletes.

== Medalists ==
Gold	Jesús Ángel García; Spain (ESP)
Silver	Valentin Kononen; Finland (FIN)
Bronze	Valeriy Spitsyn; Russia (RUS)

== Abbreviations ==
- All times shown are in hours:minutes:seconds

DNS	did not start
NM	no mark
WR	world record
WL	world leading
AR	area record
NR	national record
PB	personal best
SB	season best

== Final ==
RANK	FINAL RANKING	TIME
	Jesús Ángel García (ESP)	3:41:41
	Valentin Kononen (FIN)	3:42:02
	Valeriy Spitsyn (RUS)	3:42:50
4.	Axel Noack (GER)	3:43:50
5.	Basilio Labrador (ESP)	3:46:46
6.	René Piller (FRA)	3:46:57
7.	Tim Berrett (CAN)	3:50:23
8.	Carlos Mercenario (MEX)	3:50:53
9.	Jean-Claude Corre (FRA)	3:51:51
10.	Sergey Korepanov (KAZ)	3:52:50
11.	Viktor Ginko (BLR)	3:53:41
12.	Germán Sánchez (MEX)	3:54:07
13.	Giovanni Perricelli (ITA)	3:54:30
14.	Simon Baker (AUS)	3:57:11
15.	Massimo Quiriconi (ITA)	3:57:33
16.	Vyacheslav Smirnov (RUS)	3:58:20
17.	Andres Marén (ESP)	3:58:45
18.	Štefan Malík (SVK)	4:01:28
19.	Jonathan Matthews (USA)	4:02:52
20.	Fumio Imamura (JPN)	4:03:22
21.	Pascal Charriere (SUI)	4:04:19
22.	German Skurygin (RUS)	4:04:27
23.	Les Morton (GBR)	4:06:56
24.	Milos Holusa (CZE)	4:06:56
25.	Modris Liepins (LAT)	4:10:35
26.	Aldo Bertoldi (SUI)	4:12:09
27.	Sergey Shildkret (AZE)	4:14:10
28.	José Urbano (POR)	4:17:34
29.	Adhemir Domingues (BRA)	4:19:08
30.	Trond Moretro (NOR)	4:19:14
31.	Herman Nelson (USA)	4:21:08
32.	Hirofumi Sakai (JPN)	4:21:33
33.	Michael Harvey (AUS)	4:23:40
34.	Eloy Quispe (BOL)	4:26:20
35.	Aleksandr Stiglenko (KGZ)	4:31:51
—	Hartwig Gauder (GER)	DNF
—	Zoltán Czukor (HUN)	DNF
—	Ronald Weigel (GER)	DNF
—	Stefan Johansson (SWE)	DNF
—	Julio César Urías (GUA)	DNF
—	Miguel Angel Rodríguez (MEX)	DSQ
—	Robert Korzeniowski (POL)	DSQ
—	Godfried Dejonckheere (BEL)	DSQ
—	Vitaliy Popovich (UKR)	DSQ
—	Aleksandr Potashov (BLR)	DSQ
—	Tomasz Lipiec (POL)	DNS

== See also ==
- 1992 Men's Olympic 50km Walk (Barcelona)
- 1996 Men's Olympic 50km Walk (Atlanta)
