= Štefan Malík =

Slovak racewalker

Personal information
- Born: 11 February 1966 (age 60) Šurany, Czechoslovakia

Sport
- Sport: Race walking

Štefan Malík (born 11 February 1966) is a Slovak retired race walker. He competed in two consecutive Summer Olympics for his native country.

== Achievements ==
| Year | Competition | Venue | Position | Event | Notes |
Representing Czechoslovakia
| 1987 | Universiade | Zagreb, Yugoslavia | 12th | 20 km | 1:34:24 |
| 1991 | Universiade | Sheffield, United Kingdom | 4th | 20 km | 1:25:37 |
Representing Slovakia
| 1993 | World Championships | Stuttgart, Germany | 18th | 50 km | 4:01:28 |
| 1994 | European Championships | Helsinki, Finland | 22nd | 50 km | 4:07:45 |
| 1995 | World Race Walking Cup | Beijing, China | 13th | 50 km | 3:49:47 |
| 1995 | World Championships | Gothenburg, Sweden | 11th | 50 km | 3:54:23 |
| 1996 | Olympic Games | Atlanta, United States | 21st | 50 km | 3:58:40 |
| 1997 | World Championships | Athens, Greece | 18th | 50 km | 3:59:52 |
| 1998 | European Championships | Budapest, Hungary | 13th | 50 km | 3:57:35 |
| 2000 | European Race Walking Cup | Eisenhüttenstadt, Germany | 15th | 50 km | 3:57:25 |
| 2000 | Olympic Games | Sydney, Australia | 20th | 50 km | 3:56:44 |
| 2001 | European Race Walking Cup | Dudince, Slovakia | 9th | 50 km | 3:51:58 |
| 2001 | World Championships | Edmonton, Canada | 23rd | 50 km | 4:04:50 |
