= Jesús Ángel García =

Spanish race walker (born 1969)

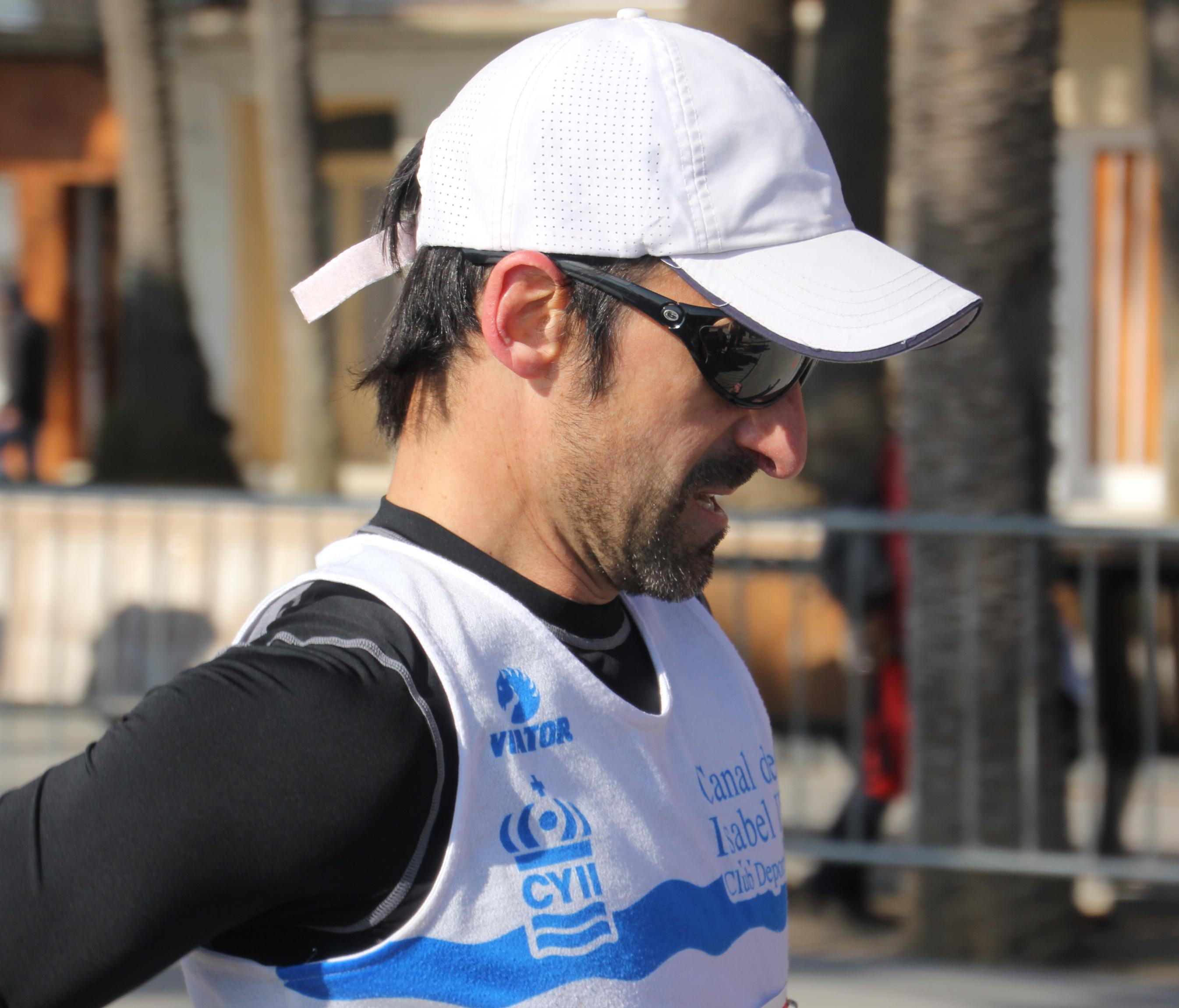
- García in 2012

Personal information
- Full name: Jesús Ángel García Bragado
- Nationality: Spanish
- Born: 17 October 1969 (age 56) Madrid, Spain
- Height: 1.72 m (5 ft 8 in)
- Weight: 64 kg (141 lb)

Sport
- Country: Spain
- Sport: Athletics
- Event: 50km Race Walk
Medal record
Men's athletics
Representing Spain
World Championships
Gold medal – first place	1993 Stuttgart	50 km walk
Silver medal – second place	1997 Athens	50 km walk
Silver medal – second place	2001 Edmonton	50 km walk
Silver medal – second place	2009 Berlin	50 km walk
European Championships
Silver medal – second place	2006 Gothenburg	50 km walk
Bronze medal – third place	2002 Munich	50 km walk

Jesús Ángel García Bragado (born 17 October 1969) is a Spanish race walker. He has competed at eight Olympic Games, the most Olympic appearances ever in athletics. He was married to gymnast Carmen Acedo. He retired in 2021 after the Tokyo Olympics.

== Personal bests ==
Event	Result	Venue	Date
20 km	1:23:00 hrs	(Spain) A Coruña	20 June 2009
50 km	3:39:54 hrs	(Czech Republic) Poděbrady	20 April 1997

== Olympic results ==
Olympic Games	Discipline	Place
(Spain) 1992 Barcelona	50 km Walk	10
(United States) 1996 Atlanta	50 km Walk	DNF
(Australia) 2000 Sydney	50 km Walk	12
(Greece) 2004 Athens	50 km Walk	5
(China) 2008 Beijing	50 km Walk	4
(United Kingdom) 2012 London	50 km Walk	19
(Brazil) 2016 Rio de Janeiro	50 km Walk	20
(Japan) 2020 Tokyo	50 km Walk	35

== Achievements ==
Year	Competition	Venue	Position	Event	Notes
Representing Spain
1991	Universiade	Sheffield, United Kingdom	5th	20 km	1:26:17
1992	Olympic Games	Barcelona, Spain	10th	50 km	3:58:43
1993	World Race Walking Cup	Monterrey, Mexico	2nd	50 km	3:52:44
1993	World Championships	Stuttgart, Germany	1st	50 km	3:41:41
1994	European Championships	Helsinki, Finland	4th	50 km	3:45:25
1995	World Race Walking Cup	Beijing, China	2nd	50 km	3:41:54
1995	World Championships	Gothenburg, Sweden	5th	50 km	3:48:05
1996	European Race Walking Cup	A Coruña, Spain	1st	50 km	3:51:01
1996	European Race Walking Cup	A Coruña, Spain	1st	Team - 50 km	437 pts
1996	Olympic Games	Atlanta, United States	—	50 km	DNF
1997	World Race Walking Cup	Poděbrady, Czech Republic	1st	50 km	3:39:54
1997	World Championships	Athens, Greece	2nd	50 km	3:44:59
1998	European Race Walking Cup	Dudince, Slovakia	2nd	50 km	3:43:17
1998	European Race Walking Cup	Dudince, Slovakia	1st	Team - 50 km	21 pts
1998	European Championships	Budapest, Hungary	—	50 km	DQ
1999	World Race Walking Cup	Mézidon-Canon, France	4th	50 km	3:40:40
1999	World Championships	Seville, Spain	—	50 km	DNF
2000	European Race Walking Cup	Eisenhüttenstadt, Germany	1st	50 km	3:42:51
2000	European Race Walking Cup	Eisenhüttenstadt, Germany	2nd	Team - 50 km	15 pts
2000	Olympic Games	Sydney, Australia	12th	50 km	3:49:31
2001	European Race Walking Cup	Dudince, Slovakia	1st	50 km	3:44:26
2001	European Race Walking Cup	Dudince, Slovakia	2nd	Team - 50 km	21 pts
2001	World Championships	Edmonton, Canada	2nd	50 km	3:43:07
2002	European Championships	Munich, Germany	3rd	50 km	3:44:33
2002	World Race Walking Cup	Turin, Italy	—	50 km	DQ
2003	World Championships	Paris, France	6th	50 km	3:43:56
2004	Olympic Games	Athens, Greece	5th	50 km	3:44:42
2004	World Race Walking Cup	Naumburg, Germany	6th	50 km	3:50:33
2005	European Race Walking Cup	Miskolc, Hungary	14th	20 km	1:24:05
2005	European Race Walking Cup	Miskolc, Hungary	2nd	Team - 20 km	33 pts
2005	World Championships	Helsinki, Finland	—	50 km	DSQ
2006	European Championships	Gothenburg, Sweden	2nd	50 km	3:42:48
2006	World Race Walking Cup	A Coruña, Spain	6th	50 km	3:46:11
2007	European Race Walking Cup	Royal Leamington Spa, United Kingdom	6th	50 km	3:46:08
2007	European Race Walking Cup	Royal Leamington Spa, United Kingdom	2nd	Team - 50 km	23 pts
2007	World Championships	Osaka, Japan	—	50 km	DQ
2008	World Race Walking Cup	Cheboksary, Russia	14th	50 km	3:52:31
2008	Olympic Games	Beijing, China	4th	50 km	3:44:08
2009	European Race Walking Cup	Metz, France	2nd	50 km	3:46:27
2009	European Race Walking Cup	Metz, France	2nd	Team - 50 km	13 pts
2009	World Championships	Berlin, Germany	2nd	50 km	3:41:37
2010	World Race Walking Cup	Chihuahua, Mexico	5th	50 km	3:55:41
2010	European Championships	Barcelona, Spain	5th	50 km	3:47:56
2011	World Championships	Daegu, South Korea	—	50 km	DQ
2012	World Race Walking Cup	Saransk, Russia	6th	50 km	3:48:15
2012	Olympic Games	London, United Kingdom	19th	50 km	3:48:32
2013	European Race Walking Cup	Dudince, Slovakia	11th	50 km	3:52:37
2013	World Championships	Moscow, Russia	12th	50 km	3:46:44
2014	World Race Walking Cup	Taicang, China	20th	50 km	3:55:38
2014	European Championships	Zurich, Switzerland	8th	50 km	3:45:41
2015	European Race Walking Cup	Murcia, Spain	—	50 km	DQ
2015	World Championships	Beijing, China	9th	50 km	3:46:43
2016	World Race Walking Team Champ.	Rome, Italy	—	50 km	DNF
2016	Olympic Games	Rio de Janeiro, Brazil	20th	50 km	3:54:29
2018	World Race Walking Team Champ.	Taicang, China	18th	50 km	3:53:48
2019	World Championships	Doha, Qatar	8th	50 km	4:11:28
2021	Olympic Games	Sapporo, Japan	35th	50 km	4:10:03
