= Roman Bílek =

Czech racewalker

Roman Bílek (born 29 September 1967) is a retired Czech race walker.

He was born in Ostrava and represented the club AK Kroměříž. He finished 21st at the 1994 European Championships and 45th at the 2008 Olympic Games, both in the 50 kilometres race. He also competed at the IAAF World Race Walking Cup in 1997 and 2008 in the 20 kilometres race. He became Czech champion in 1994.
