= Les Morton =

British athletics

Personal information
- Nationality: British (English)
- Born: 1 July 1958 (age 68) Sheffield, West Riding of Yorkshire
- Height: 170 cm (5 ft 7 in)
- Weight: 64 kg (141 lb)

Sport
- Sport: Athletics
- Event: race walker
- Club: Sheffield Walking Club

Leslie Morton (born 1 July 1958) is a retired male race walker from England who competed at the 1988 Summer Olympics and the 1992 Summer Olympics.

== Biography ==
Morton finished third behind New Zealander Murray Day in the 3km walk event at the 1986 AAA Championships.

At the 1988 Olympic Games in Seoul, he represented Great Britain and made a second Olympic appearance for Great Britain at the 1992 Olympic Games in Barcelona.

He set his personal best (3:57.48) in the 50 km race in 1989.

== International competitions ==
Year	Competition	Venue	Position	Event	Notes
Representing the United Kingdom and England
1985	World Race Walking Cup	St John's, Isle of Man	17th	50 km	4:11:32
1986	European Championships	Stuttgart, West Germany	—	50 km	DQ
1988	Olympic Games	Seoul, South Korea	27th	50 km	3:59:30
1990	European Championships	Split, Yugoslavia	11th	50 km	4:05:28
1991	World Race Walking Cup	San Jose, United States	20th	50 km	4:02:11
1991	World Championships	Tokyo, Japan	10th	50 km	4:09:18
1992	Olympic Games	Barcelona, Spain	21st	50 km	4:09:34
1993	World Championships	Stuttgart, Germany	23rd	50 km	4:06:56
1995	World Championships	Gothenburg, Sweden	—	50 km	DQ
