= Arturo Di Mezza =

Italian racewalker

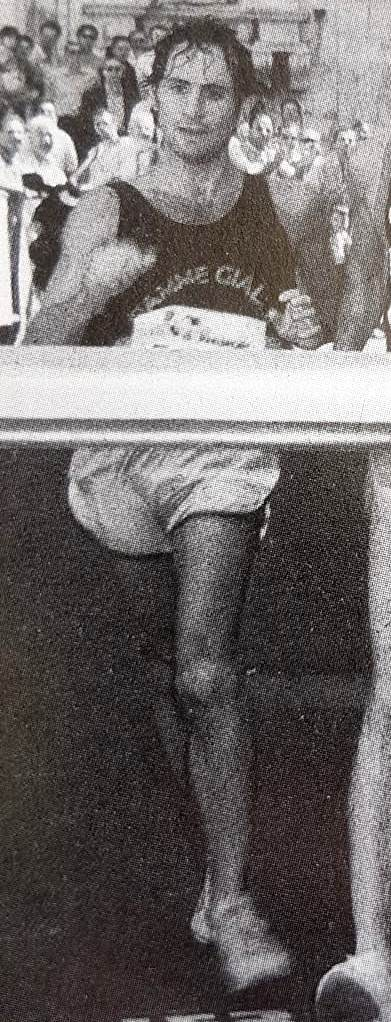
- Di Mezza while arrived second in the photo finish at the 1996 Italian championships.

Personal information
- National team: Italy: 25 caps (1991-2000)
- Born: 16 July 1969 (age 56) Naples, Italy
- Height: 1.72 m (5 ft 8 in)
- Weight: 63 kg (139 lb)

Sport
- Sport: Athletics
- Event: Racewalking
- Club: G.S. Fiamme Gialle

Achievements and titles
- Personal bests: 20 km walk: 1:21:36 (1998); 50 km walk: 3:44:52 (1996)
Medal record
Individual
Event	1st	2nd	3rd
European Race Walking Cup	0	1	0
Summer Universiade	0	0	3
Total	0	1	3
Team
Event	1st	2nd	3rd
World Race Walking Cup	0	1	1
European Race Walking Cup	0	2	0
Total	0	3	1

Arturo Di Mezza (born 16 July 1969) is a former Italian race walker who was 4th in the 50 km walk at the 1996 Summer Olympics.

== Career ==
In his career he has participated in four editions of the world championships, two Olympics and as many European championships. In these 8 occasions he has reached the top eight 5 times.

Since 1984 to 1993 was trained by Vincenzo Rossi in Naples and since 1993 to 2000 was trained in Saluzzo by Sandro Damilano, brother of Maurizio and Giorgio Damilano.

== Achievements ==
Year	Competition	Venue	Position	Event	Notes
Representing Italy
1988	World Junior Championships	Sudbury, Canada	9th	10,000 m	43:31.59
1991	Universiade	Sheffield, England	3rd	20 km	1:25:09
1993	World Championships	Stuttgart, Germany	13th	20 km	1:24:59
1994	European Championships	Helsinki, Finland	14th	50 km	3:56:00
1995	World Championships	Gothenburg, Sweden	7th	50 km	3:49:46
1995	Universiade	Fukuoka, Japan	3rd	20 km	1:24:33
1996	European Race Walking Cup	A Coruña, Spain	2nd	50 km	3:52:36
1996	Olympic Games	Atlanta, United States	4th	50 km	3:44:52 PB
1997	World Championships	Athens, Greece	8th	50 km	3:51:33
1997	Universiade	Catania, Italy	3rd	20 km	1:26:12
1998	European Championships	Budapest, Hungary	7th	50 km	3:48:49
1999	World Championships	Seville, Spain	6th	50 km	3:53:50
2000	European Race Walking Cup	Eisenhüttenstadt, Germany	19th	20 km	1:22:46
2000	Olympic Games	Sydney, Australia	—	50 km	DNF

== See also ==
- Italian all-time lists - 50 km walk
- Italian team at the running events
- Italy at the IAAF World Race Walking Cup
- Italy at the European Race Walking Cup
