= Modris Liepiņš =

Latvian race walker

Modris Liepiņš (born 3 August 1966 in Tukums) is a Latvian race walker.

== Achievements ==
| Year | Competition | Venue | Position | Event | Notes |
Representing Latvia
| 1993 | World Championships | Stuttgart, Germany | 25th | 50 km | 4:10:35 |
| 1994 | European Championships | Helsinki, Finland | 20th | 20 km | 1:27:14 |
| 1994 | European Championships | Helsinki, Finland | — | 50 km | DNF |
| 1996 | Olympic Games | Atlanta, United States | 23rd | 50 km | 4:01:12 |
| 1997 | World Championships | Athens, Greece | 24th | 20 km | 1:26:24 |
| 1998 | European Championships | Budapest, Hungary | — | 50 km | DNF |
| 1999 | World Championships | Seville, Spain | 10th | 50 km | 3:57:11 |
| 1999 | World Race Walking Cup | Mézidon-Canon, France | 15th | 50 km | 3:48:30 |
| 2000 | Olympic Games | Sydney, Australia | 9th | 50 km | 3:48:36 |
| 2001 | European Race Walking Cup | Dudince, Slovakia | 16th | 20 km | 1:23:45 |
| 2001 | World Championships | Edmonton, Canada | — | 50 km | DSQ |
| 2002 | European Championships | Munich, Germany | 9th | 50 km | 3:52:36 |
| 2002 | World Race Walking Cup | Turin, Italy | 10th | 50 km | 3:53:49 |
| 2003 | World Championships | Paris, France | — | 50 km | DSQ |
| 2004 | Olympic Games | Athens, Greece | 25th | 50 km | 4:04:26 |
| 2004 | World Race Walking Cup | Naumburg, Germany | 10th | 50 km | 3:54:52 |
| 2005 | World Championships | Helsinki, Finland | 17th | 50 km | 4:01:54 |
| 2007 | Valmiera Marathon | Valmiera, Latvia | 1st | Marathon | 2:46:21 |
