= Viktor Ginko =

Belarusian racewalker

Viktor (or Viktar) Ginko (Belarusian: Віктар Гінко; born 7 December 1965 in Sharkovshchina, Vitebsk) is a male race walker from Belarus.

== Achievements ==
Year	Competition	Venue	Position	Event	Notes
Representing Belarus
1993	World Championships	Stuttgart, Germany	11th	50 km	3:53:41
1994	European Championships	Helsinki, Finland	—	50 km	DSQ
1995	World Race Walking Cup	Beijing, China	6th	50 km	3:45:48
1995	World Championships	Gothenburg, Sweden	—	50 km	DSQ
1996	Olympic Games	Atlanta, United States	5th	50 km	3:45:27
1997	World Race Walking Cup	Poděbrady, Czech Republic	12th	50 km	3:49:23
1997	World Championships	Athens, Greece	—	50 km	DNF
1999	World Race Walking Cup	Mézidon-Canon, France	7th	50 km	3:43:15
1999	World Championships	Seville, Spain	—	50 km	DNF
2000	Olympic Games	Sydney, Australia	—	50 km	DSQ
2001	European Race Walking Cup	Dudince, Slovakia	7th	50 km	3:50:59
2005	World Championships	Helsinki, Finland	—	50 km	DSQ
