= Sergey Korepanov (race walker) =

Kazakhstani race walker

Medal record

Men's athletics

Representing Kazakhstan

Asian Championships
Bronze medal – third place	1993 Manila	20 km walk

Sergey Arsentyevich Korepanov (Russian: Серге́й Арсентьевич Корепанов; born 9 May 1964 in Izhevsk) is a Kazakhstani race walker. He competed at the men's 50 kilometres race walk events at the 1996, 2000, and 2004 Summer Olympics.

== Achievements ==
Year	Competition	Venue	Position	Notes
Representing Kazakhstan
1993	World Championships	Stuttgart, Germany	10th	50 km
1993	Asian Championships	Manila, Philippines	3rd	20 km
1994	Asian Games	Hiroshima, Japan	1st	50 km
1995	World Race Walking Cup	Beijing, China	9th	50 km
1995	World Championships	Gothenburg, Sweden	9th	50 km
1996	Olympic Games	Atlanta, United States	8th	50 km
1997	World Championships	Athens, Greece	12th	50 km
1998	Asian Games	Bangkok, Thailand	2nd	50 km
1999	World Race Walking Cup	Mézidon-Canon, France	1st	50 km, 3:39:22 AR
1999	World Championships	Seville, Spain	DNF	50 km
2000	Olympic Games	Sydney, Australia	15th	50 km
2001	World Championships	Edmonton, Canada	20th	50 km
2001	East Asian Games	Osaka, Japan	3rd	20 km
2002	World Race Walking Cup	Turin, Italy	7th	50 km
2003	World Championships	Paris, France	9th	50 km
2004	Olympic Games	Athens, Greece	15th	50 km
2005	World Championships	Helsinki, Finland	19th	50 km
