= Valeriy Spitsyn =

Russian racewalker

Medal record

Men's athletics

Representing Russia

European Championships
Gold medal – first place	1994 Helsinki	50 km walk

Valeriy Anatolyevich Spitsyn (Russian: Вале́рий Анато́льевич Спи́цын; born 5 December 1965 in Magnitogorsk, Chelyabinsk Oblast) is a retired male race walker from Russia.

== International competitions ==
Year	Competition	Venue	Position	Event	Notes
Representing Unified Team
1992	Olympic Games	Barcelona, Spain	4th	50 km	3:54:39
Representing Russia
1993	World Championships	Stuttgart, Germany	3rd	50 km	3:42:50
1994	European Championships	Helsinki, Finland	1st	50 km	3:41:07
1995	World Championships	Gothenburg, Sweden	—	50 km	DNF
2000	Olympic Games	Sydney, Australia	—	50 km	DNF

Records
Preceded by Andrey Perlov	Men's 50km Walk World Record Holder; 21 May 2000 – 8 August 2002	Succeeded by Robert Korzeniowski
