= Aleksandar Raković =

Serbian racewalker

Personal information
- Born: 13 April 1968 (age 58) Niš, Nišava, Yugoslavia

Sport
- Sport: Race walking

Aleksandar Raković (born 13 April 1968) is a retired male race walker from Serbia. He competed in three consecutive Summer Olympics for Serbia and Montenegro, starting in 1996.

== Achievements ==
Year	Competition	Venue	Position	Event	Notes
Representing FR Yugoslavia
1993	Universiade	Buffalo, United States	11th	20 km	1:34:51
1994	European Championships	Helsinki, Finland	19th	50 km	4:01:17
1995	World Championships	Gothenburg, Sweden	6th	50 km	3:49:35
1996	Olympic Games	Atlanta, Georgia, United States	11th	50 km	3:51:31
1998	European Championships	Budapest, Hungary	—	50 km	DNF
1999	World Championships	Seville, Spain	13th	50 km	3:59:56
2000	European Race Walking Cup	Eisenhüttenstadt, Germany	43rd	20 km	1:27:42
2000	Olympic Games	Sydney, Australia	11th	50 km	3:49:16
2001	European Race Walking Cup	Dudince, Slovakia	18th	50 km	3:56:56
2001	World Championships	Edmonton, Canada	21st	50 km	4:01:50
2002	European Championships	Munich, Germany	7th	50 km	3:51:47
Representing Serbia and Montenegro
2003	World Championships	Paris, France	—	50 km	DNF
2004	Olympic Games	Athens, Greece	23rd	50 km	4:02:06
2005	World Championships	Helsinki, Finland	—	50 km	DSQ
Representing Serbia
2006	European Championships	Gothenburg, Sweden	—	50 km	DNF

== See also ==
- Serbian records in athletics
