= Thomas Wallstab =

German racewalker

Personal information
- Nationality: German
- Born: 29 January 1968 (age 58)

Sport
- Sport: Athletics
- Event: Racewalking

Thomas Wallstab (born 29 January 1968) is a German racewalker. He competed in the men's 50 kilometres walk at the 1996 Summer Olympics.
