= Aldo Bertoldi =

Swiss racewalker

Personal information
- Nationality: Swiss
- Born: 5 January 1961 (age 65)

Sport
- Sport: Athletics
- Event: Racewalking

Aldo Bertoldi (born 5 January 1961) is a Swiss racewalker. He competed in the men's 50 kilometres walk at the 1992 Summer Olympics.
