= Zoltán Czukor =

Hungarian racewalker (born 1962)

Zoltán Czukor (born 18 December 1962 in Komló, Baranya) is a male race walker from Hungary, who competed in three consecutive Summer Olympics for his native country. He still competes in long-distance walking races including 24Hr, Antibes 6 days, and the famous Paris-Colmar where he did not finish the 2011 edition.

== Achievements ==
Year	Competition	Venue	Position	Event	Notes
Representing Hungary
1990	European Championships	Split, Yugoslavia	14th	50 km	4:16.40
1993	World Championships	Stuttgart, Germany	—	50 km	DNF
1994	European Championships	Helsinki, Finland	11th	50 km	3:51:25
1995	World Championships	Gothenburg, Sweden	—	50 km	DSQ
1997	World Championships	Athens, Greece	20th	50 km	4:05:09
1998	European Championships	Budapest, Hungary	24th	50 km	4:09:02
1999	World Championships	Seville, Spain	—	50 km	DSQ
2000	Olympic Games	Sydney, Australia	—	50 km	DSQ
2001	European Race Walking Cup	Dudince, Slovakia	14th	50 km	3:53:18
2004	Olympic Games	Athens, Greece	24th	50 km	4:03:51
2007	World Championships	Osaka, Japan	—	50 km	DSQ
2008	Olympic Games	Beijing, PR China	46th	50 km	4:20:07
2009	European Race Walking Cup	Metz, France	—	50 km	DSQ
