= Miloš Holuša =

Czech race walker

Miloš Holuša (born 2 May 1965) is a Czech race walker who specialized in the 50 kilometres walk. He competed in every World Championship between 1993 and 2005, and also three Olympic Games.

He was born in Vítkov. At the World Championships he finished 24th in 1993, 19th in 1995, 26th in 1997 (and 29th in the 20 kilometres event), 16th in 1999 and 18th in 2001 (17th in the 20 kilometres event). He was disqualified in 2003 and 2005. At the Olympic Games he finished 27th in 1996, 16th in 2000 and 38th in 2004.

He finished 16th in the 50 km at the 1994 European Championships, 18th in the 50 km at the 1998 European Championships, 20th in the 20 km at the 2002 European Championships and 21st in the 50 km at the 2006 European Championships. His highest placement at the World Race Walking Cup was 14th in 2002. He also became Czech champion several times.

His personal best time in the 50 kilometres event was 3:49:08 hours, achieved in April 1996 in Fribourg. This is the current Czech record.
