= Sylvain Caudron =

French racewalker

Personal information
- Nationality: French
- Born: 10 September 1969 (age 56)

Sport
- Sport: Athletics
- Event: Racewalking

Sylvain Caudron (born 10 September 1969) is a French racewalker. He competed in the men's 50 kilometres walk at the 2000 Summer Olympics.
