= Tim Berrett =

English race walker (born 1965)

Personal information
- Nationality: British/Canadian
- Born: January 23, 1965 (age 61) Royal Tunbridge Wells, Kent, England
- Height: 1.80 m (5 ft 11 in)
- Weight: 67 kg (148 lb)
- Spouse: Tara Croxford

Sport
- Sport: Athletics
- Event: Race walking
- Club: Tonbridge AC; Leduc Track Club
Medal record
Representing Canada
Commonwealth Games
Silver medal – second place	1994 Victoria	30km walk
Bronze medal – third place	2002 Manchester	30km walk

Timothy Berrett (born January 23, 1965) is an English born former race walker who emigrated to Canada in 1987. He is married to Tara Croxford.

A resident of Edmonton, he represented Canada in five consecutive Summer Olympics starting in 1992 (Barcelona, Spain). He competed in the 2008 Beijing Olympics at the 50 km walk event, finishing in 38th place with a time of 4:08:08.

== Biography ==
He was born in Tunbridge Wells, Kent, England and completed his Ph.D. degree at the University of Alberta, having completed master's degrees in economics and public administration at Queen's University and his undergraduate studies at the Brasenose College, Oxford.

Berrett was a member of Tonbridge AC and finished second behind Phil Vesty in the 3,000 metres walk event at the British 1984 AAA Championships.

In 2007 at Osaka, he competed in his ninth IAAF Athletics World Championships, a world record for a male track and field athlete, equaled by Spanish race walker Jesús Ángel García and Jamaican hurdler Danny McFarlane in the 2009 World Championships in Athletics (Berlin).

Berrett is married to former field hockey international Tara Croxford, who also competed at the Barcelona Games for her native country.

== Personal bests ==
- 20 km: 1:21:46 hrs – Victoria, Canada, 13 August 2000
- 50 km: 3:50:21 hrs – Tijuana, Mexico, 21 March 2004

== Achievements ==
Year	Competition	Venue	Position	Event	Notes
Representing Canada
1990	Pan American Race Walking Cup	Xalapa, Mexico	14th	20 km	1:33:19
1991	World Race Walking Cup	San Jose, United States	22nd	20 km	
1991	World Race Walking Cup	San Jose, United States	—	50 km	DNF
1992	Olympic Games	Barcelona, Spain	14th	20 km	1:28:25
1992	Olympic Games	Barcelona, Spain	—	50 km	DSQ
1993	World Indoor Championships	Toronto, Canada	4th	5,000 m	
1993	World Race Walking Cup	Monterrey, Mexico	5th	50 km	3:55:12
1994	Commonwealth Games	Victoria, Canada	2nd	30 km	2:08:22
1995	World Race Walking Cup	Beijing, China	—	50 km	DSQ
1997	World Race Walking Cup	Poděbrady, Czech Republic	—	20 km	DSQ
1999	World Race Walking Cup	Mézidon-Canon, France	47th	20 km	
2000	Olympic Games	Sydney, Australia	26th	20 km	
2000	Olympic Games	Sydney, Australia	—	50 km	DSQ
2002	Commonwealth Games	Manchester, United Kingdom	3rd	50 km	4:04:25
2003	World Championships	Paris, France	19th	50 km	
2004	World Race Walking Cup	Naumburg, Germany	64th	20 km	
2004	Olympic Games	Athens, Greece	31st	50 km	
2006	World Race Walking Cup	A Coruña, Spain	39th	50 km	
2007	World Championships	Osaka, Japan	19th	50 km	4:06:47

== See also ==
- Canadian records in track and field
