= Peter Tichý =

Slovak racewalker

Personal information
- Nationality: Slovak
- Born: 12 March 1969 (age 56)

Sport
- Sport: Athletics
- Event: Racewalking

Peter Tichý (born 12 March 1969) is a Slovak racewalker. He competed in the men's 50 kilometres walk at the 1996 Summer Olympics and the 2000 Summer Olympics.
