= 1979 IAAF World Race Walking Cup =

- Organisers: IAAF
- Edition: 9th
- Date: September 29–30
- Host city: Eschborn, Hessen, Federal Republic of Germany
- Events: 3
- Participation: 147 athletes from 18 nations

The 1979 IAAF World Race Walking Cup was held in Eschborn, Federal Republic of Germany, on September 29–30, 1979. The event was also known as IAAF Race Walking World Cup. The women's 5 km race was now officially introduced into the competition with the women's teams competing for the Eschborn Cup.

Complete results were published.

== Medallists ==
Event	Gold		Silver		Bronze	
Men
20 km walk	Daniel Bautista (MEX)	1:18:49	Boris Yakovlev (URS)	1:19:46	Mykola Vinnichenko (URS)	1:20:05
50 km walk	Martín Bermúdez (MEX)	3:43:36	Enrique Vera Ibanez (MEX)	3:43:59	Viktor Dorovskikh (URS)	3:45:51
Lugano Cup (Men)
Team (Men)	Mexico	240 pts	Soviet Union	235 pts	East Germany	201 pts
Women
5 km walk	Marion Fawkes (GBR)	22:51	Carol Tyson (GBR)	22:59	Thorill Gylder (NOR)	23:08
Eschborn Cup (Women)
Team (Women)	United Kingdom	85 pts	Sweden	74 pts	Norway	69 pts

== Results ==
=== Men's 20 km ===
Place	Athlete	Nation	Time
1st place, gold medalist(s)	Daniel Bautista	Mexico (MEX)	1:18:49
2nd place, silver medalist(s)	Boris Yakovlev	Soviet Union (URS)	1:19:46
3rd place, bronze medalist(s)	Nikolay Vinnichenko	Soviet Union (URS)	1:20:05
4	Anatoliy Solomin	Soviet Union (URS)	1:20:13
5	Pyotr Pochinchuk	Soviet Union (URS)	1:20:28
6	Ernesto Canto	Mexico (MEX)	1:21:12
7	Hartwig Gauder	East Germany (GDR)	1:21:50
8	Félix Gómez	Mexico (MEX)	1:22:09
9	Roland Wieser	East Germany (GDR)	1:22:32
10	Jozef Pribilinec	Czechoslovakia (TCH)	1:22:44
11	Ronald Weigel	East Germany (GDR)	1:22:50
12	Fred Sparmann	East Germany (GDR)	1:22:52
13	Bohdan Bułakowski	Poland (POL)	1:23:01
14	Alessandro Pezzatini	Italy (ITA)	1:23:42
15	Juraj Bencík	Czechoslovakia (TCH)	1:24:34
16	János Szálas	Hungary (HUN)	1:24:42
17	Antonio Carrera	Mexico (MEX)	1:25:09
18	Pavol Blaûek	Czechoslovakia (TCH)	1:25:14
19	Jan Ornoch	Poland (POL)	1:25:17
20	Giancarlo Gandossi	Italy (ITA)	1:25:25
21	Dave Smith	Australia (AUS)	1:25:36
22	Štefan Petrík	Czechoslovakia (TCH)	1:26:02
23	Imre Stankovics	Hungary (HUN)	1:26:25
24	Jaroslaw Kazmierski	Poland (POL)	1:26:46
25	Jorge Llopart	Spain (ESP)	1:26:55
26	Roger Mills	Great Britain (GBR)	1:27:25
27	Olly Flynn	Great Britain (GBR)	1:27:49
28	Bo Gustafsson	Sweden (SWE)	1:27:59
29	Chris Harvey	Great Britain (GBR)	1:28:26
30	Alf Brandt	Sweden (SWE)	1:28:47
31	Jim Heiring	United States (USA)	1:28:51
32	Amos Seddon	Great Britain (GBR)	1:28:56
33	Zbigniew Gosławski	Poland (POL)	1:29:24
34	Per Möller	Sweden (SWE)	1:29:47
35	Chris Hansen	United States (USA)	1:29:56
36	Miklós Domján	Hungary (HUN)	1:29:57
37	Owe Hemmingsson	Sweden (SWE)	1:30:02
38	Alfons Schwarz	West Germany (FRG)	1:30:24
39	Karl Degener	West Germany (FRG)	1:31:02
40	Wolfgang Wiedemann	West Germany (FRG)	1:32:23
41	Graham Seatter	New Zealand (NZL)	1:33:03
42	Rod Huxley	Australia (AUS)	1:33:45
43	Peter Fullager	Australia (AUS)	1:34:13
44	John Smith	Australia (AUS)	1:36:15
45	Steve Pecinovsky	United States (USA)	1:37:22
46	Andrés Marin	Spain (ESP)	1:39:26
47	Luis Bueno	Spain (ESP)	1:39:39
48	Gumersindo Carné	Spain (ESP)	1:50:46
—	Hans Michalski	West Germany (FRG)	DQ
—	Maurizio Damilano	Italy (ITA)	DQ
—	Neal Pike	United States (USA)	DQ
—	Roberto Buccione	Italy (ITA)	DNF
—	Neil Blaney	New Zealand (NZL)	DNF
—	Allan Callow	New Zealand (NZL)	DNF

=== Men's 50 km ===
Place	Athlete	Nation	Time
1st place, gold medalist(s)	Martín Bermúdez	Mexico (MEX)	3:43:36
2nd place, silver medalist(s)	Enrique Vera	Mexico (MEX)	3:43:59
3rd place, bronze medalist(s)	Viktor Dorovskikh	Soviet Union (URS)	3:45:51
4	Raúl González	Mexico (MEX)	3:46:36
5	Vyacheslav Fursov	Soviet Union (URS)	3:46:55
6	Pyotr Melnik	Soviet Union (URS)	3:49:31
7	José Marín	Spain (ESP)	3:49:46
8	Dietmar Meisch	East Germany (GDR)	3:50:02
9	Paolo Grecucci	Italy (ITA)	3:50:51
10	Willi Sawall	Australia (AUS)	3:51:08
11	Sandro Bellucci	Italy (ITA)	3:51:08
12	Matthias Kroel	East Germany (GDR)	3:52:10
13	Horst Matern	East Germany (GDR)	3:52:10
14	Domenico Carpentieri	Italy (ITA)	3:52:44
15	Otto Barch	Soviet Union (URS)	3:53:32
16	Hans Binder	West Germany (FRG)	3:57:31
17	Jaromír Vanous	Czechoslovakia (TCH)	3:58:01
18	Feliks Sliwinski	Poland (POL)	3:59:19
19	László Sátor	Hungary (HUN)	3:59:37
20	Heinrich Schubert	West Germany (FRG)	3:59:58
21	Gerhard Weidner	West Germany (FRG)	4:01:01
22	Bengt Simonsen	Sweden (SWE)	4:01:43
23	Vittorio Visini	Italy (ITA)	4:02:28
24	Agustin Jorbo	Spain (ESP)	4:02:52
25	Tim Erickson	Australia (AUS)	4:03:17
26	Stanisław Rola	Poland (POL)	4:03:29
27	Jan Dzurnák	Czechoslovakia (TCH)	4:04:03
28	János Dalmati	Hungary (HUN)	4:08:52
29	Michael Parker	New Zealand (NZL)	4:08:56
30	Stig-Olof Elovsson	Sweden (SWE)	4:09:44
31	Adrian James	Great Britain (GBR)	4:09:52
32	Max Sjöholm	Sweden (SWE)	4:10:52
33	Per Rasmussen	Sweden (SWE)	4:11:56
34	Vince OʼSullivan	United States (USA)	4:12:15
35	Marco Evoniuk	United States (USA)	4:12:37
36	John Sheard	Australia (AUS)	4:13:55
37	Ian Richards	Great Britain (GBR)	4:14:47
38	Dan OʼConnor	United States (USA)	4:17:34
39	George Nibre	Great Britain (GBR)	4:18:19
40	Rafael Espejo	Spain (ESP)	4:24:02
41	Vladislav Dostál	Czechoslovakia (TCH)	4:24:56
42	Zoltán Rutkai	Hungary (HUN)	4:25:56
43	Chris Maddocks	Great Britain (GBR)	4:27:03
44	Carl Schueler	United States (USA)	4:27:24
45	Attila Márton	Hungary (HUN)	4:28:52
—	Greg Sockhill	Australia (AUS)	DQ
—	Jürgen Meyer	West Germany (FRG)	DQ
—	Steffen Müller	East Germany (GDR)	DQ
—	Pedro Aroche	Mexico (MEX)	DQ
—	Manuel Alcalde	Spain (ESP)	DNF
—	Allan Callow	New Zealand (NZL)	DNF
—	Ross Pilkington	New Zealand (NZL)	DNF
—	Graham Seatter	New Zealand (NZL)	DNF
—	Bogusław Duda	Poland (POL)	DNF
—	Stanisław Korneluk	Poland (POL)	DNF

=== Team (men) ===
The team rankings, named Lugano Trophy, combined the 20km and 50km events team results.

Place	Country	Points
1st place, gold medalist(s)	Mexico	240 pts
2nd place, silver medalist(s)	Soviet Union	235 pts
3rd place, bronze medalist(s)	East Germany	201 pts
4	Italy	152 pts
5	Czechoslovakia	142 pts
6	Poland	127 pts
7	Hungary	112 pts
8	West Germany	108 pts
9	Australia	103 pts
10	Sweden	101 pts
11	Spain	94 pts
12	United Kingdom	89 pts
13	United States	67 pts
14	New Zealand	25 pts

=== Women's 5 km ===
Place	Athlete	Nation	Time
1st place, gold medalist(s)	Marion Fawkes	Great Britain (GBR)	22:51
2nd place, silver medalist(s)	Carol Tyson	Great Britain (GBR)	22:59
3rd place, bronze medalist(s)	Thorill Gylder	Norway (NOR)	23:08
4	Elisabet Olsson	Sweden (SWE)	23:10
5	Susan Orr-Cook	Australia (AUS)	23:25
6	Irene Bateman	Great Britain (GBR)	23:25
7	Britt-Marie Carlsson	Sweden (SWE)	23:30
8	Margareta Simu	Sweden (SWE)	23:48
9	Mia Kjølberg	Norway (NOR)	23:50
10	Susan Liers-Westerfield	United States (USA)	24:02
11	Sally Pierson	Australia (AUS)	24:08
12	Fröydis Hilsen	Norway (NOR)	24:14
13	Elaine Cox	Great Britain (GBR)	24:18
14	Gerd Gylder	Norway (NOR)	24:22
15	Lorraine Young-Jachno	Australia (AUS)	24:35
16	Jeanine Piroux/Vignat	France (FRA)	24:36
17	Ann Jansson	Sweden (SWE)	24:45
18	Giuliana Salce	Italy (ITA)	24:46
19	Chris Sakelarios	United States (USA)	24:50
20	Ingrid Adam	West Germany (FRG)	24:56
21	Regine Broders	West Germany (FRG)	24:57
22	Sue Brodock	United States (USA)	25:00
23	Paula Kash	United States (USA)	25:08
24	Karen Iselin	Australia (AUS)	25:21
25	Monika Glöckler	West Germany (FRG)	25:24
26	Kristina Schenk	West Germany (FRG)	25:42
27	Viviane Guilmain	France (FRA)	25:49
28	Suzanne Griesbach	France (FRA)	25:57
29	Margot Vetterli	Switzerland (SUI)	26:09
30	Sonia Ripanti	Italy (ITA)	26:27
31	Claudine Gerald/Richard	France (FRA)	26:31
32	Charlotte Hansen	Denmark (DEN)	26:32
33	Edith Sappl	Switzerland (SUI)	26:50
34	Tina Thomsen	Denmark (DEN)	26:52
35	Valeria Carpanese	Italy (ITA)	27:17
36	Jeanette Hansen	Denmark (DEN)	27:25
37	Paula Gobbi	Italy (ITA)	27:47
38	Ulla Kristiansen	Denmark (DEN)	28:07
39	Christiane Udriot	Switzerland (SUI)	28:58
40	Nicol Caloz	Switzerland (SUI)	30:37

=== Team (women) ===
Place	Country	Points
1st place, gold medalist(s)	United Kingdom	85 pts
2nd place, silver medalist(s)	Sweden	74 pts
3rd place, bronze medalist(s)	Norway	69 pts
4	Australia	64 pts
5	United States	48 pts
6	West Germany	38 pts
7	France	36 pts
8	Italy	26 pts
9	Switzerland	14 pts
10	Denmark	12 pts

== Participation ==
The participation of 147 athletes (107 men/40 women) from countries is reported.

- Australia (8/4)
- Czechoslovakia (7/-)
- Denmark (-/4)
- East Germany (8/-)
- France (-/4)
- Hungary (7/-)
- Italy (8/4)
- Mexico (8/-)
- New Zealand (5/-)
- Norway (-/4)
- Poland (8/-)
- Soviet Union (8/-)
- Spain (8/-)
- Sweden (8/4)
- Switzerland (-/4)
- United Kingdom (8/4)
- United States (8/4)
- West Germany (8/4)

== Qualifying rounds ==
From 1961 to 1985 there were qualifying rounds for the men's competition with the first two winners proceeding to the final. This year, México, the German Democratic Republic, Italy, the Soviet Union, the United States, Australia, and New Zealand proceeded directly to the final.

Countries qualifying for the final are highlighted in green

=== Zone 1 ===
Reus, Spain, August 25/26

Rank	Nation	Points
1	Spain	61 pts
2	Hungary	60 pts
3	France	54 pts
4	Norway	36 pts
5	Switzerland	28 pts

=== Zone 2 ===
Władysławowo, Poland, August 25/26

Rank	Nation	Points
1	Poland	60 pts
2	Czechoslovakia	44 pts
3	Romania	30 pts
4	Finland	22 pts
—	Bulgaria	DNS
—	Denmark	DNS

=== Zone 3 ===
Hove, Belgium, September 3

Rank	Nation	Points
1	West Germany	68 pts
2	Sweden	66 pts
3	United Kingdom	65 pts
4	Belgium	29 pts
5	Netherlands	14 pts
