= 1977 IAAF World Race Walking Cup =

- Organisers: IAAF
- Edition: 8th
- Date: 24–25 September
- Host city: Milton Keynes, Buckinghamshire, United Kingdom
- Events: 2 + 1 invitation
- Participation: 96 + 23 guest athletes from 12 + 3 guest nations

The 1977 IAAF World Race Walking Cup was held in Milton Keynes, United Kingdom, on 24–25 September 1977. For the first time, a new competition name IAAF Race Walking World Cup was introduced replacing the former Lugano Trophy. As in 1975, there was a women's 5 km race held as invitation event. Mexico was dominant in the men's events, taking the team title and the top two spots in the 20 km and 50 km events through Daniel Bautista, Domingo Colín, Raúl González and Pedro Aroche. Sweden's Siv Gustavsson won the invitational women's event.

Complete results were published.

== Medallists ==
Event	Gold		Silver		Bronze	
Men
20 km walk	Daniel Bautista (MEX)	1:24:02	Domingo Colín (MEX)	1:24:31	Karl-Heinz Stadtmüller (GDR)	1:24:51
50 km walk	Raúl González (MEX)	4:04:16	Pedro Aroche (MEX)	4:04:55	Paolo Grecucci (ITA)	4:06:27
Lugano Cup (Men)
Team (Men)	Mexico	185 pts	East Germany	180 pts	Italy	160 pts
Women^{†}
5 km walk^{†}	Siv Gustavsson (SWE)	23:19	Carol Tyson (GBR)	23:46	Margareta Simu (SWE)	24:12

^{†}: Invitation event.

== Results ==
=== Men's 20 km ===
Place	Athlete	Nation	Time
1st place, gold medalist(s)	Daniel Bautista	Mexico (MEX)	1:24:02
2nd place, silver medalist(s)	Domingo Colín	Mexico (MEX)	1:24:31
3rd place, bronze medalist(s)	Karl-Heinz Stadtmüller	East Germany (GDR)	1:24:51
4	Maurizio Damilano	Italy (ITA)	1:25:33
5	Gérard Lelièvre	France (FRA)	1:26:48
6	Yevgeniy Yevsyukov	Soviet Union (URS)	1:27:03
7	Roland Wieser	East Germany (GDR)	1:27:09
8	Anatoliy Solomin	Soviet Union (URS)	1:27:41
9	Armando Zambaldo	Italy (ITA)	1:27:53
10	Roberto Buccione	Italy (ITA)	1:28:28
11	Sandro Bellucci	Italy (ITA)	1:28:36
12	Nikolay Polozov	Soviet Union (URS)	1:28:58
13	Hartwig Gauder	East Germany (GDR)	1:29:51
14	Vladimir Golubnichiy	Soviet Union (URS)	1:30:33
15	Juraj Bencík	Czechoslovakia (TCH)	1:30:38
16	Jaroslaw Kazmierski	Poland (POL)	1:30:39
17	Bo Gustafsson	Sweden (SWE)	1:30:43
18	Jan Dzurnák	Czechoslovakia (TCH)	1:31:05
19	Jan Ornoch	Poland (POL)	1:31:09
20	Jean-Claude Decosse	France (FRA)	1:31:25
21	Zbigniew Gosławski	Poland (POL)	1:31:30
22	Dominique Guebey	France (FRA)	1:31:31
23	Mieczysław Górski	Poland (POL)	1:31:33
24	Werner Heyer	East Germany (GDR)	1:32:02
25	Marcos Castro	Mexico (MEX)	1:32:09
26	János Szálas	Hungary (HUN)	1:32:18
27	Alfons Schwarz	West Germany (FRG)	1:32:28
28	Štefan Petrík	Czechoslovakia (TCH)	1:32:49
29	Lennart Lundgren	Sweden (SWE)	1:32:58
30	Mike Holmes	Great Britain (GBR)	1:33:06
31	Bengt Simonsen	Sweden (SWE)	1:33:09
32	Mick Greasley	Great Britain (GBR)	1:33:13
33	Roger Mills	Great Britain (GBR)	1:33:22
34	Jürgen Meyer	West Germany (FRG)	1:33:26
35	Göran Aneheim	Sweden (SWE)	1:33:38
36	Jim Heiring	United States (USA)	1:33:40
37	Imre Stankovics	Hungary (HUN)	1:33:46
38	Hans Michalski	West Germany (FRG)	1:34:11
39	Amos Seddon	Great Britain (GBR)	1:34:31
40	Szaba Grandpierre	Hungary (HUN)	1:35:04
41	Neal Pike	United States (USA)	1:35:20
42	Jean-Pierre Garnung	France (FRA)	1:35:52
43	Wolfgang Werner	West Germany (FRG)	1:36:11
44	Tivadar Szilagyi	Hungary (HUN)	1:36:38
45	Sam Dibernando	United States (USA)	1:39:48
—	Ángel Flores	Mexico (MEX)	DQ
—	Todd Scully	United States (USA)	DQ
—	Evûen Zedník	Czechoslovakia (TCH)	DNF

=== Men's 50 km ===
Place	Athlete	Nation	Time
1st place, gold medalist(s)	Raúl González	Mexico (MEX)	4:04:16
2nd place, silver medalist(s)	Pedro Aroche	Mexico (MEX)	4:04:55
3rd place, bronze medalist(s)	Paolo Grecucci	Italy (ITA)	4:06:27
4	Veniamin Soldatenko	Soviet Union (URS)	4:08:20
5	Ralf Knütter	East Germany (GDR)	4:10:13
6	Steffen Müller	East Germany (GDR)	4:14:34
7	László Sátor	Hungary (HUN)	4:14:50
8	Heinrich Schubert	West Germany (FRG)	4:15:15
9	Horst Matern	East Germany (GDR)	4:15:50
10	Hans Binder	West Germany (FRG)	4:17:23
11	Bohdan Bułakowski	Poland (POL)	4:18:05
12	Martín Bermúdez	Mexico (MEX)	4:19:07
13	Larry Young	United States (USA)	4:19:56
14	August Hirt	United States (USA)	4:20:06
15	Franco Vecchio	Italy (ITA)	4:21:16
16	Leif Karlsson	Sweden (SWE)	4:21:55
17	Brian Adams	Great Britain (GBR)	4:23:54
18	Feliks Sliwinski	Poland (POL)	4:24:05
19	Karl Degener	West Germany (FRG)	4:24:11
20	Alain Moulinet	France (FRA)	4:24:34
21	Rosario Valore	Italy (ITA)	4:24:45
22	Owe Hemmingsson	Sweden (SWE)	4:25:07
23	Mario Kerber	East Germany (GDR)	4:25:27
24	Stig-Olof Elovsson	Sweden (SWE)	4:25:38
25	Ladíslav Vitez	Czechoslovakia (TCH)	4:25:45
26	Ferenc Danovsky	Hungary (HUN)	4:26:06
27	Bob Dobson	Great Britain (GBR)	4:26:09
28	John Warhurst	Great Britain (GBR)	4:26:47
29	Luc Gauthier	France (FRA)	4:27:03
30	František Biro	Czechoslovakia (TCH)	4:27:48
31	Yuriy Andryushchenko	Soviet Union (URS)	4:28:37
32	Bogusław Kmiecik	Poland (POL)	4:29:15
33	Peter Hodkinson	Great Britain (GBR)	4:29:27
34	Jean-Pierre Garcia	France (FRA)	4:30:03
35	Franciszek Ustarbowski	Poland (POL)	4:36:39
36	Karoly Orban	Hungary (HUN)	4:37:47
37	Jean-Louis Hauth	France (FRA)	4:38:00
38	Jaroslav Pták	Czechoslovakia (TCH)	4:42:16
39	Vytautas Papas	Soviet Union (URS)	4:46:46
—	Enrique Vera Ibanez	Mexico (MEX)	DQ
—	Algis Sakalis	Soviet Union (URS)	DQ
—	Gerhard Weidner	West Germany (FRG)	DNF
—	Zoltán Rutkai	Hungary (HUN)	DNF
—	Giancarlo Lisi	Italy (ITA)	DNF
—	Stefan Sjunnesson	Sweden (SWE)	DNF
—	Josef Macek	Czechoslovakia (TCH)	DNF
—	Tom Dooley	United States (USA)	DNF
—	Dan OʼConnor	United States (USA)	DNF

=== Team (men) ===
The team rankings, named Lugano Trophy, combined the 20km and 50km events team results.

Place	Country	Points
1st place, gold medalist(s)	Mexico	185 pts
2nd place, silver medalist(s)	East Germany	180 pts
3rd place, bronze medalist(s)	Italy	160 pts
4	Soviet Union	128 pts
5	Poland	112 pts
6	West Germany	99 pts
7	France	99 pts
8	Sweden	94 pts
9	Czechoslovakia	82 pts
10	Hungary	69 pts
11	United Kingdom	69 pts
12	United States	56 pts

=== Women's 5 km^{†} ===
Place	Athlete	Nation	Time
1st place, gold medalist(s)	Siv Gustavsson	Sweden (SWE)	23:19
2nd place, silver medalist(s)	Carol Tyson	Great Britain (GBR)	23:46
3rd place, bronze medalist(s)	Margareta Simu	Sweden (SWE)	24:12
4	Judy Farr	Great Britain (GBR)	24:23
5	Britt Holmquist	Sweden (SWE)	24:27
6	Elisabet Olsson	Sweden (SWE)	24:51
7	Beverley Francis	Great Britain (GBR)	25:41
8	Ginney Lovell	Great Britain (GBR)	25:58
9	Christine Coleman	Great Britain (GBR)	26:01
10	Elaine Cox	Great Britain (GBR)	26:14
11	Irene Bateman	Great Britain (GBR)	26:24
12	Siobhan MacAuley	Great Britain (GBR)	27:39
13	Sheila Miller	Australia (AUS)	27:51
14	Pamela Reynolds	Ireland (IRL)	27:58
15	Susan Till	Great Britain (GBR)	28:09
16	Carolyn Gee	Great Britain (GBR)	28:51
17	Shirley Rook	Great Britain (GBR)	29:03
18	Mary Brown	Great Britain (GBR)	29:27
19	Karen Bingham	Great Britain (GBR)	29:39
20	Julie Robery	Great Britain (GBR)	30:29
21	Linda Nicholls	Great Britain (GBR)	31:49
22	M. Servais	Belgium (BEL)	35:52
—	Marion Fawkes	Great Britain (GBR)	DNF

^{†}: Invitation event.

== Participation ==
The participation of 119 athletes (96 men/23 women) from countries is reported.

- Australia (-/1)
- Belgium (-/1)
- East Germany (8/-)
- France (8/-)
- Hungary (8/-)
- Ireland (-/1)
- Italy (8/-)
- Mexico (8/-)
- Poland (8/-)
- Soviet Union (8/)
- Sweden (8/4)
- Czechoslovakia (8/-)
- United Kingdom (8/16)
- United States (8/-)
- West Germany (8/-)

== Qualifying rounds ==
From 1961 to 1985 there were qualifying rounds for the men's competition with the first two winners proceeding to the final. This year, the Soviet Union, the German Democratic Republic, the Federal Republic of Germany, the United Kingdom, the United States, and México proceeded directly to the final.

Countries qualifying for the final are highlighted in green

=== Zone 1 ===
San Remo, Italy, 27/28 August

Rank	Nation	Points
1	Italy	58 pts
2	Hungary	50 pts
3	Spain	32 pts
4	Switzerland	18 pts
—	Bulgaria	DNS
—	Romania	DNS

=== Zone 2 ===
Vänersborg, Sweden, 27 August

Rank	Nation	Points
1	Poland	53 pts
2	Sweden	51 pts
3	Finland	23 pts
4	Norway	21 pts

=== Zone 3 ===
Lessines, Belgium, 27/28 August

Rank	Nation	Points
1	Czechoslovakia	84 pts
2	France	64 pts
3	Belgium	49 pts
4	Netherlands	32 pts
5	Ireland	7 pts
