= 1981 IAAF World Race Walking Cup =

- Organisers: IAAF
- Edition: 10th
- Date: October 3–4
- Host city: Valencia, Valencia, Spain
- Events: 3
- Participation: 160 athletes from 18 nations

The 1981 IAAF World Race Walking Cup was held on 3 and 4 October 1981 in the streets of Valencia, Spain. The event was also known as IAAF Race Walking World Cup.

Complete results were published.

== Medallists ==
Event	Gold		Silver		Bronze	
Men
Men's 20 km walk	Ernesto Canto; Mexico	1:23:52	Roland Wieser; East Germany	1:24:12	Alessandro Pezzatini; Italy	1:24:24
Men's 50 km walk	Raúl González; Mexico	3:48:30	Hartwig Gauder; East Germany	3:52:18	Sandro Bellucci; Italy	3:54:57
Lugano Cup (Men)
Team (Men)	Italy	227 pts	Soviet Union	227 pts	Mexico	221 pts
Women
Women's 5 km walk	Siv Gustavsson; Sweden	22:56.9	Aleksandra Deveranskaya; Soviet Union	23:17.2	Lyudmila Khrushchova; Soviet Union	23:25.4
Eschborn Cup (Women)
Team (Women)	Soviet Union	105 pts	Sweden	104 pts	Australia	90 pts

== Results ==
=== Men's 20 km ===
Place	Athlete	Nation	Time
1st place, gold medalist(s)	Ernesto Canto	Mexico (MEX)	1:23:52
2nd place, silver medalist(s)	Roland Wieser	East Germany (GDR)	1:24:12
3rd place, bronze medalist(s)	Alessandro Pezzatini	Italy (ITA)	1:24:24
4	Yevgeniy Yevsyukov	Soviet Union (URS)	1:24:51
5	José Marín	Spain (ESP)	1:25:00
6	Maurizio Damilano	Italy (ITA)	1:25:08
7	Anatoliy Solomin	Soviet Union (URS)	1:26:39
8	Pyotr Pochenchuk	Soviet Union (URS)	1:27:03
9	Bo Gustafsson	Sweden (SWE)	1:27:28
10	Guillaume LeBlanc	Canada (CAN)	1:28:02
11	Pavol Blažek	Czechoslovakia (TCH)	1:28:12
12	Stefan Petrik	Czechoslovakia (TCH)	1:28:20
13	Carlo Mattioli	Italy (ITA)	1:28:52
14	Ralf Meisel	East Germany (GDR)	1:29:24
15	Stanisław Rola	Poland (POL)	1:29:37
16	Wang Chuntang	China (CHN)	1:29:45
17	Steve Barry	Great Britain (GBR)	1:29:56
18	Erling Andersen	Norway (NOR)	1:30:03
19	Ian McCombie	Great Britain (GBR)	1:30:03
20	Eduardo Linares	Mexico (MEX)	1:30:05
21	Todd Scully	United States (USA)	1:30:22
22	Jim Heiring	United States (USA)	1:30:39
23	Mykola Vynnychenko	Soviet Union (URS)	1:31:11
24	Jozef Zimka	Czechoslovakia (TCH)	1:31:13
25	Marcelino Colín	Mexico (MEX)	1:31:23
26	Zdzisław Szlapkin	Poland (POL)	1:31:29
27	Bogusław Duda	Poland (POL)	1:31:35
28	Ray Sharp	United States (USA)	1:32:30
29	Bill Dyer	Australia (AUS)	1:32:52
30	Roger Mills	Great Britain (GBR)	1:33:30
31	Andrés Marin	Spain (ESP)	1:33:46
32	François Lapointe	Canada (CAN)	1:33:49
33	Amos Seddon	Great Britain (GBR)	1:33:52
34	Philippe Lafleur	France (FRA)	1:34:08
35	Per Rasmussen	Sweden (SWE)	1:34:18
36	Jaroslaw Kazmierski	Poland (POL)	1:34:18
37	Roland Nilsson	Sweden (SWE)	1:34:47
38	Martial Fesselier	France (FRA)	1:35:05
39	Pascal Lenglart	France (FRA)	1:35:59
40	Jozef Pribilinec	Czechoslovakia (TCH)	1:36:25
41	Duncan Knox	Australia (AUS)	1:37:41
42	Denis Terraz	France (FRA)	1:38:40
43	Horst Matern	East Germany (GDR)	1:39:21
44	Francisco Botonero	Spain (ESP)	1:39:55
45	Tore Strømøy	Norway (NOR)	1:40:07
46	Michael Stones	Canada (CAN)	1:41:56
47	Gu Fangyuan	China (CHN)	1:44:47
48	Anders Hjelle	Norway (NOR)	1:46:05
49	Michael Harvey	Australia (AUS)	1:46:17
—	Zhang Fuxin	China (CHN)	DQ
—	Luis Bueno	Spain (ESP)	DQ
—	Ralf Kowalsky	East Germany (GDR)	DQ
—	Giorgio Damilano	Italy (ITA)	DQ
—	Félix Gómez	Mexico (MEX)	DQ
—	Owe Hemmingsson	Sweden (SWE)	DQ
—	Steve Pecinovsky	United States (USA)	DQ
—	Dave Smith	Australia (AUS)	DNF
—	Tor-Ivar Guttulsrød	Norway (NOR)	DNF

=== Men's 50 km ===
Place	Athlete	Nation	Time
1st place, gold medalist(s)	Raúl González	Mexico (MEX)	3:48:30
2nd place, silver medalist(s)	Hartwig Gauder	East Germany (GDR)	3:52:18
3rd place, bronze medalist(s)	Sandro Bellucci	Italy (ITA)	3:54:57
4	Dietmar Meisch	East Germany (GDR)	3:56:27
5	Arturo Bravo	Mexico (MEX)	3:58:04
6	Martín Bermúdez	Mexico (MEX)	3:58:16
7	Valeriy Suntsov	Soviet Union (URS)	4:01:30
8	Uwe Dünkel	East Germany (GDR)	4:02:04
9	Gérard Lelièvre	France (FRA)	4:03:06
10	Giacomo Poggi	Italy (ITA)	4:03:15
11	Viktor Dorovskikh	Soviet Union (URS)	4:03:51
12	Viktor Grodenchuk	Soviet Union (URS)	4:07:16
13	Marco Evoniuk	United States (USA)	4:07:44
14	Domenico Carpentieri	Italy (ITA)	4:13:19
15	Bohdan Bułakowski	Poland (POL)	4:15:34
16	Pavol Jati	Czechoslovakia (TCH)	4:17:06
17	Lubos Mackanic	Czechoslovakia (TCH)	4:17:11
18	Bengt Simonsen	Sweden (SWE)	4:17:57
19	Paolo Grecucci	Italy (ITA)	4:18:56
20	Ian Richards	Great Britain (GBR)	4:21:04
21	Dan OʼConnor	United States (USA)	4:22:24
22	Vladimír Podroužek	Czechoslovakia (TCH)	4:23:31
23	Krzysztof Drajski	Poland (POL)	4:25:10
24	Jan Pilczuk	Poland (POL)	4:26:28
25	Stig-Olof Elovsson	Sweden (SWE)	4:28:08
26	Vince OʼSullivan	United States (USA)	4:29:49
27	Wayne Glusker	United States (USA)	4:33:01
28	Barry Graham	Great Britain (GBR)	4:34:34
29	Max Sjöholm	Sweden (SWE)	4:34:58
30	François Lapointe	Canada (CAN)	4:35:51
31	Bob Dobson	Great Britain (GBR)	4:36:13
32	Pavel Szikora	Czechoslovakia (TCH)	4:37:31
33	John Sheard	Australia (AUS)	4:38:48
34	Dennis Jackson	Great Britain (GBR)	4:39:37
35	Cato Viken	Norway (NOR)	4:41:04
36	Alain Moulinet	France (FRA)	4:42:58
37	Agustin Jorbo	Spain (ESP)	4:43:03
38	Harry Summers	Australia (AUS)	4:43:43
39	Stanisław Korneluk	Poland (POL)	4:47:27
40	Jean-Pierre Saint-Martin	France (FRA)	4:52:04
41	Maurice Dumont	France (FRA)	5:03:32
—	Rafael Espejo	Spain (ESP)	DQ
—	Jorge Llopart	Spain (ESP)	DQ
—	Enrique Vera	Mexico (MEX)	DQ
—	Ragner Hofnes	Norway (NOR)	DQ
—	Peter Fullager	Australia (AUS)	DNF
—	Willi Sawall	Australia (AUS)	DNF
—	Marcel Jobin	Canada (CAN)	DNF
—	Guillaume LeBlanc	Canada (CAN)	DNF
—	Michael Stones	Canada (CAN)	DNF
—	Gu Fangyuan	China (CHN)	DNF
—	Wang Chuntang	China (CHN)	DNF
—	Zhang Fuxin	China (CHN)	DNF
—	Manuel Alcalde	Spain (ESP)	DNF
—	Ronald Weigel	East Germany (GDR)	DNF
—	Harald Krokli	Norway (NOR)	DNF
—	Lars Ove Moen	Norway (NOR)	DNF
—	Torbjørn Janse	Sweden (SWE)	DNF
—	Vyacheslav Fursov	Soviet Union (URS)	DNF

=== Team (men) ===
The team rankings, named Lugano Trophy, combined the 20km and 50km events team results.

Place	Country	Points
1st place, gold medalist(s)	Italy	227 pts
2nd place, silver medalist(s)	Soviet Union	227 pts
3rd place, bronze medalist(s)	Mexico	221 pts
4	East Germany	208 pts
5	Czechoslovakia	176 pts
6	Poland	150 pts
7	United States	148 pts
8	United Kingdom	137 pts
9	Sweden	131 pts
10	France	97 pts
11	Spain	77 pts
12	Canada	74 pts
13	Australia	57 pts
14	Norway	52 pts
15	China	34 pts

=== Women's 5 km ===
Place	Athlete	Nation	Time
1st place, gold medalist(s)	Siv Gustavsson	Sweden (SWE)	22:56.9
2nd place, silver medalist(s)	Aleksandra Derevinskaya	Soviet Union (URS)	23:17.2
3rd place, bronze medalist(s)	Lyudmila Khrushchova	Soviet Union (URS)	23:25.4
4	Fröydis Hilsen	Norway (NOR)	23:34.4
5	Ann Jansson	Sweden (SWE)	23:42.2
6	Sally Pierson	Australia (AUS)	23:51.3
7	Sue Cook	Australia (AUS)	24:04.9
8	Ann Peel	Canada (CAN)	24:05.9
9	Susan Liers-Westerfield	United States (USA)	24:15.8
10	Natalya Sharipova	Soviet Union (URS)	24:20.7
11	Ann-Marie Larsson	Sweden (SWE)	24:31.0
12	Suzanne Griesbach	France (FRA)	24:35.6
13	Irene Bateman	Great Britain (GBR)	24:40.0
14	Margot Vetterli	Switzerland (SUI)	24:43.9
15	Lillian Millen	Great Britain (GBR)	24:47.4
16	Olga Tshgunova	Soviet Union (URS)	24:53.2
17	Britt Holmqvist	Sweden (SWE)	25:03.5
18	Jill Barrett	Great Britain (GBR)	25:05.1
19	Carol Tyson	Great Britain (GBR)	25:10.9
20	Ann Ryan	Australia (AUS)	25:14.2
21	Gillian Grant	Canada (CAN)	25:26
22	Teresa Palacios	Spain (ESP)	25:31
23	Ingrid Adam	West Germany (FRG)	25:34
24	Line Viken	Norway (NOR)	25:34
25	Bonnie Dillon	United States (USA)	25:39
26	Vicki Jones	United States (USA)	25:51
27	Mia Kjølberg	Norway (NOR)	26:08
28	Paula Kash	United States (USA)	26:21
29	Claudine Gerald/Richard	France (FRA)	26:35
30	Mandy Holland	Canada (CAN)	26:44
31	Regine Broders	West Germany (FRG)	26:53
32	Isabelle Dumont	France (FRA)	26:56
33	Jeanine Gosselin	France (FRA)	27:02
34	Joni Bender	Canada (CAN)	27:04
35	Valeria Carpanese	Italy (ITA)	27:07
36	Lene Cassidy	Denmark (DEN)	27:16
37	Karin Jensen	Denmark (DEN)	27:17
38	Helga Henrich	West Germany (FRG)	27:23
39	Belén Asensio	Spain (ESP)	27:27
40	Gunhild Kristiansen	Denmark (DEN)	28:00
41	Begoña Miranda	Spain (ESP)	28:04
42	Paola Pastorini	Italy (ITA)	28:12
43	Nuria Lloret	Spain (ESP)	28:20
44	Renate Bauch	West Germany (FRG)	28:30
45	Laurence Perrin	Switzerland (SUI)	29:32
46	Helle Bütow Jørgensen	Denmark (DEN)	30:30
47	Astrid Mignot	Switzerland (SUI)	32:02
—	Lorraine Young-Jachno	Australia (AUS)	DNF
—	Thorill Gylder	Norway (NOR)	DNF

=== Team (women) ===
Place	Country	Points
1st place, gold medalist(s)	Soviet Union	105 pts
2nd place, silver medalist(s)	Sweden	104 pts
3rd place, bronze medalist(s)	Australia	90 pts
4	United Kingdom	76 pts
5	Norway	71 pts
6	Canada	68 pts
7	United States	66 pts
8	France	55 pts
9	West Germany	41 pts
10	Spain	33 pts
11	Switzerland	31 pts
12	Denmark	25 pts
13	Italy	15 pts

== Participation ==
The participation of 160 athletes (111 men/49 women) from 18 countries is reported.

- Australia (8/4)
- Canada (4/4)
- China (3/-)
- Czechoslovakia (8/-)
- Denmark (-/4)
- East Germany (8/-)
- France (8/4)
- Italy (8/2)
- Mexico (8/-)
- Norway (8/4)
- Poland (8/-)
- Soviet Union (8/4)
- Spain (8/4)
- Sweden (8/4)
- Switzerland (-/3)
- United Kingdom (8/4)
- United States (8/4)
- West Germany (-/4)

== Qualifying rounds ==
From 1961 to 1985 there were qualifying rounds for the men's competition with the first two winners proceeding to the final. This year, México, the Soviet Union, the German Democratic Republic, Italy, Spain, the United States, Australia, Canada, and China proceeded directly to the final.

Countries qualifying for the final are highlighted in green

=== Zone 1 ===
Saint-Aubin-lès-Elbeuf, France, September 5/6

Rank	Nation	Points
1	France	77 pts
2	Sweden	75 pts
3	Switzerland	39 pts
4	Netherlands	27 pts
5	Belgium	24 pts

=== Zone 2 ===
Helsinki, Finland, August 29/30

Rank	Nation	Points
1	United Kingdom	49 pts
2	Norway	44 pts
3	West Germany	37 pts
4	Finland	28 pts

=== Zone 3 ===
Szolnok, Hungary, August 29

Rank	Nation	Points
1	Czechoslovakia	73 pts
2	Poland	64 pts
3	Hungary	58 pts
4	Greece	23 pts
5	Austria	14 pts
