= 1978 European Athletics Championships – Men's 20 kilometres walk =

Men's 20 kilometres walk at the European Athletics Championships

The men's 20 kilometres race walk at the 1978 European Athletics Championships was held in Prague, then Czechoslovakia, on 30 August 1978.

== Medalists ==
Gold	Roland Wieser; East Germany
Silver	Pyotr Pochenchuk; Soviet Union
Bronze	Anatoliy Solomin; Soviet Union

== Results ==
=== Final ===
30 August

Rank	Name	Nationality	Time	Notes
1st place, gold medalist(s)	Roland Wieser	East Germany	1:23:11.5	CR
2nd place, silver medalist(s)	Pyotr Pochenchuk	Soviet Union	1:23:43.0	
3rd place, bronze medalist(s)	Anatoliy Solomin	Soviet Union	1:24:11.5	
4	Boris Yakovlev	Soviet Union	1:24:27.9	
5	José Marín	Spain	1:24:38.1	
6	Maurizio Damilano	Italy	1:24:57.5	
7	Hartwig Gauder	East Germany	1:25:15.7	
8	Roberto Buccione	Italy	1:25:40.9	
9	Bohdan Bułakowski	Poland	1:25:56.8	
10	Bo Gustafsson	Sweden	1:26:13.5	
11	Gérard Lelièvre	France	1:26:42.3	
12	Alessandro Pezzatini	Italy	1:26:44.2	
13	Juraj Benčík	Czechoslovakia	1:27:47.4	
14	Svetozár Blažek	Czechoslovakia	1:27:49.3	
15	Lucien Faber	Luxembourg	1:29:19.7	
16	Stanisław Rola	Poland	1:29:22.0	
17	Imre Stankovics	Hungary	1:29:33.3	
18	Štefan Petrík	Czechoslovakia	1:30:08.4	
19	Owe Hemmingsson	Sweden	1:30:44.2	
20	Alfons Schwarz	West Germany	1:31:17.6	
21	Roger-George Mills	Great Britain	1:31:52.5	
22	Yancho Kamenov	Bulgaria	1:32:08.9	
23	Erling Andersen	Norway	1:32:13.0	
24	Alf Brandt	Sweden	1:32:41.7	
25	Brian Adams	Great Britain	1:33:08.2	
26	Amos Seddom	Great Britain	1:34:17.8	
27	Knut Arne Strømøy	Norway	1:36:01.9	
	Dominique Guebey	France	DNF	
	Karl-Heinz Stadtmüller	East Germany	DQ	

== Participation ==
According to an unofficial count, 29 athletes from 14 countries participated in the event.

- Bulgaria (1)
- Czechoslovakia (3)
- East Germany (3)
- France (2)
- Hungary (1)
- Italy (3)
- Luxembourg (1)
- Norway (2)
- Poland (2)
- Soviet Union (3)
- Spain (1)
- Sweden (3)
- Great Britain (3)
- West Germany (1)
