= Index of sport of athletics record progressions =

Athletics records progressions outline the lineage and improvement of the best ratified marks in a particular athletics event.

== World records ==
=== Track events ===
- 50 metres (men) (women)
- 60 metres (men) (women)
- 100 metres (men) (women)
- 200 metres (men) (women)
- 400 metres (men) (women)
- 600 yards (men) —
- 800 metres (men) (women)
- 1000 metres (men) (women)
- 1500 metres (men) (women)
- One mile (men) (women)
- 2000 metres (men) (women)
- 3000 metres (men) (women)
- Two miles (men) (women)
- 5000 metres (men) (women)
- 10,000 metres (men) (women)
- 20,000 metres (men) (women)
- One hour (men) (women)
- 50 metres hurdles (men) (women)
- 60 metres hurdles (men) (women)
- 80 metres hurdles — (women)
- 100 metres hurdles — (women)
- 110 metres hurdles (men) —
- 400 metres hurdles (men) (women)
- 3000 metres steeplechase (men) (women)
- 4×100 metres (men) (women)
- 4×200 metres (men) (women)
- 4×400 metres (men) (women) (mixed)

=== Field events ===
- High jump (men) (men indoor) (women)
- Long jump (men) (women)
- Triple jump (men) (women)
- Pole vault (men) (men indoor) (women) (women indoor)
- Discus (men) (women)
- Hammer (men) (women)
- Javelin (men) (women)
- Shot put (men) (women)
- Pentathlon — (women)
- Heptathlon (men) (women)
- Decathlon (men) (women)

=== Road events ===
- Half marathon (men) (women)
- Marathon (men) (women)
- 100 kilometres (men) (women)
- 10 km walk (men) (women)
- 20 km walk (men) (women)
- 35 km walk (men) (women)
- 50 km walk (men) (women)

== European records ==
- Men's 100 metres European record progression
- Men's 200 metres European record progression
- Men's 400 metres European record progression
- Men's 800 metres European record progression
- Men's 1500 metres European record progression
- Men's 5000 metres European record progression

== National records ==
- Men's marathon Italian record progression
- Men's high jump Italian record progression
- Men's long jump Italian record progression
- Men's javelin throw Italian record progression
- Women's 100 metres Italian record progression
- Women's high jump Italian record progression
- Women's long jump Italian record progression
