= Athletics at the 1976 Summer Olympics – Men's 20 kilometres walk =

Men's 20 kilometres walk at the Games of the XXI Olympiad
- Venue: Olympic Stadium
- Date: July 23, 1976
- Competitors: 36 from 21 nations
- Winning time: 1:24:40.6

Medalists
1st place, gold medalist(s)		Daniel Bautista; Mexico
2nd place, silver medalist(s)		Hans-Georg Reimann; East Germany
3rd place, bronze medalist(s)		Peter Frenkel; East Germany

The official results of the Men's 20 kilometres walk at the 1976 Summer Olympics in Montreal, Quebec, Canada, held on Friday July 23, 1976. A total number of thirty-six athletes completed the race, while two of them did not finish.

== Results ==
Rank	Athlete	Nation	Time	Time behind	Notes
1st place, gold medalist(s)	Daniel Bautista	Mexico	1:24:40.6		
2nd place, silver medalist(s)	Hans-Georg Reimann	East Germany	1:25:13.8		
3rd place, bronze medalist(s)	Peter Frenkel	East Germany	1:25:29.4		
4	Karl-Heinz Stadtmüller	East Germany	1:26:50.6		
5	Raúl González	Mexico	1:28:18.2		
6	Armando Zambaldo	Italy	1:28:25.2		
7	Volodymyr Holubnychy	Soviet Union	1:29:24.6		
8	Vittorio Visini	Italy	1:29:31.6		
9	Gérard Lelièvre	France	1:29:53.6		
10	Roberto Buccione	Italy	1:30:40.0		
11	Brian Adams	Great Britain	1:30:46.2		
12	Ross Haywood	Australia	1:30:59.2		
13	Otto Barch	Soviet Union	1:31:12.4		
14	Olly Flynn	Great Britain	1:31:42.4		
15	Viktor Semyonov	Soviet Union	1:31:59.0		
16	Imre Stankovics	Hungary	1:32:06.6		
17	Jan Ornoch	Poland	1:32:19.2		
18	Gerhard Weidner	West Germany	1:32:56.8		
19	Ernesto Alfaro	Colombia	1:33:13.8		
20	Ron Laird	United States	1:33:27.6		
21	Bogusław Duda	Poland	1:33:53.4		
22	Larry Walker	United States	1:34:19.4		
23	Marcel Jobin	Canada	1:34:33.4		
24	Vinko Galušić	Yugoslavia	1:34:46.8		
25	Godfried De Jonckheere	Belgium	1:35:03.8		
26	Bengt Simonsen	Sweden	1:35:31.8		
27	Santiago Fonseca	Honduras	1:36:07.0		
28	Lucien Faber	Luxembourg	1:36:21.2		
29	Todd Scully	United States	1:36:37.4		
30	Paul Nihill	Great Britain	1:36:40.4		
31	Rafael Vega	Colombia	1:37:27.4		
32	Khoo Chong Beng	Malaysia	1:40:16.8		
33	Pat Farrelly	Canada	1:41:36.2		
34	Yoshio Morikawa	Japan	1:42:20.6		
35	Alex Oakley	Canada	1:44:08.8		
36	Henry Klein	Virgin Islands	1:50:50.4		
—	Bernd Kannenberg	West Germany	DNF		
—	Domingo Colín	Mexico	DSQ		
