= Siv Gustavsson =

Swedish racewalker (born 1957)

Medal record

Women's athletics

Representing Sweden

European Championships
Bronze medal – third place	1986 Stuttgart	10 km walk

World Race Walking Cup
Gold medal – first place	1981 Valencia	5 km walk

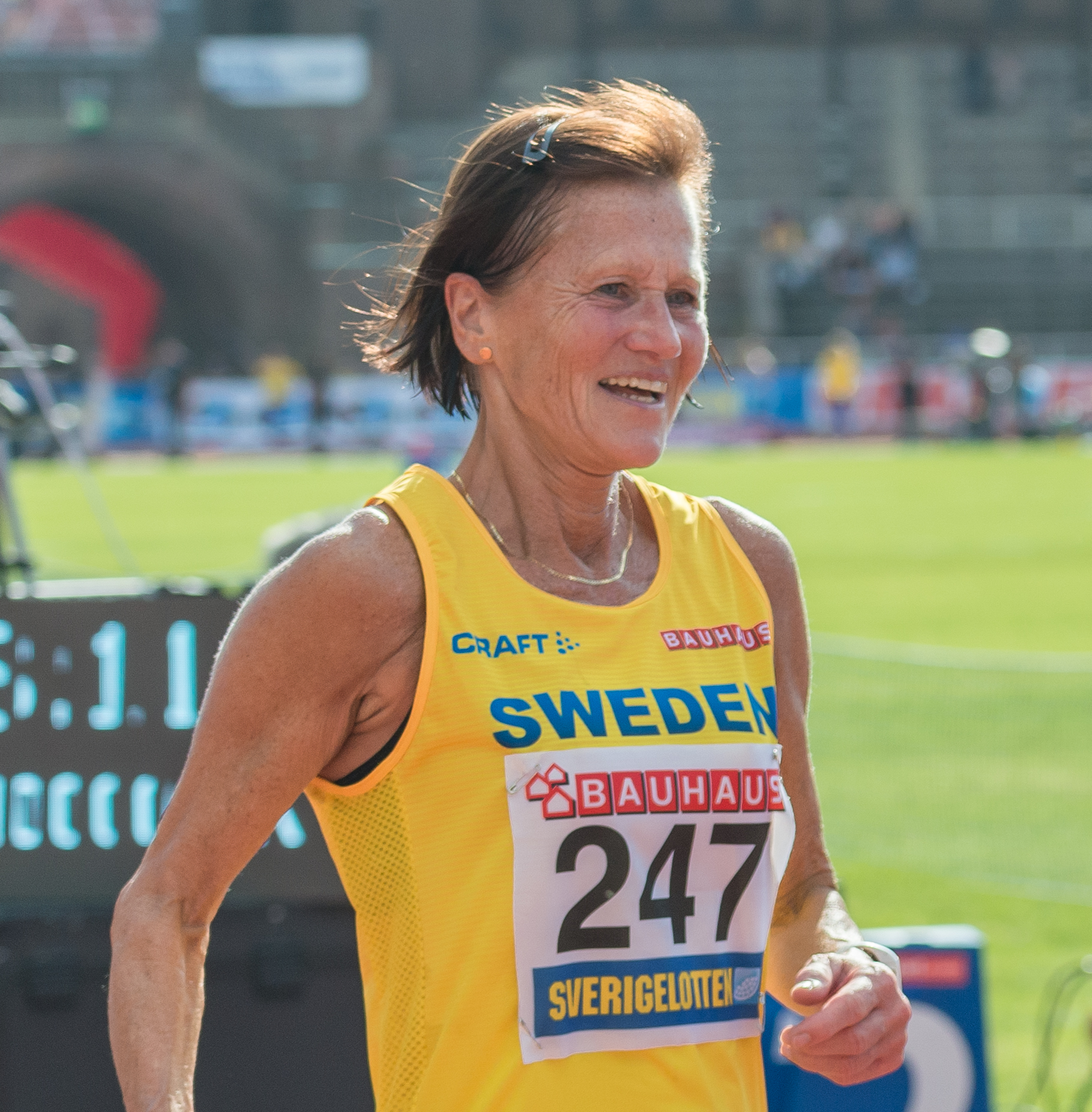
Siv Gustavsson (Karlström) during the Finland-Sweden Athletics International in Stockholms 2019.

Siv Gustavsson^{[nb]} (born 9 July 1957) is a Swedish former racewalking athlete. She was the gold medallist at the 1981 IAAF World Race Walking Cup, making her the second ever female world champion in the sport.

Gustavsson also won a bronze at the 1986 European Athletics Championships – the first year women's walks were held at that event. She won fifteen Swedish national titles from 1976 to 2004 over distance from 3000 m to 20 km.

== Career ==
She began to emerge as a walker internationally in the early 1970s, starting with a third place at the Nordic Race Walking Championships junior race in 1971, then two consecutive wins in the category in 1973 and 1975. Her first senior title at the event came over 5 km in 1977, when she beat Britt Holmquist and Norway's Thorill Gylder.

The 1975 IAAF World Race Walking Cup and 1977 IAAF World Race Walking Cup both featured invitational, non-official women's races and she showed herself to be among the world's best with a runner-up finish to fellow Swede Margareta Simu at the first race, then beating both Simu and Carol Tyson to win the 1977 race.

She missed the first official women's championship in racewalking held in 1979. She competed at the WAAA Championships in Britain in 1980 and was runner-up to Irene Bateman over 5000 m. Her career peaked at the 1981 IAAF World Race Walking Cup, where she became the second ever women's world champion in racewalking, defeating the whole field by nearly twenty seconds. The Swedish team (including Ann Jansson, Ann-Marie Larsson and Britt Holmqvist) was narrowly beaten by one point to the women's team title.

She attempted to defend her title at the 1983 IAAF World Race Walking Cup, but ending the competition in fifth place. Wit Gustavsson being their top performer, Sweden's women also fell down the team rankings into fourth place. She appeared at the 1986 European Athletics Championships and in the 10 km walk—the first ever to be held for women at the European Championships—she ranked third for a bronze medal behind Spanish athlete Mari Cruz Díaz and Ann Jansson.

She married fellow race walker Enrique Vera Ibáñez, who migrated from his native Mexico to settle with her in Sweden. Her husband gained Swedish citizenship and later represented his adoptive country at the 1991 World Championships in Athletics. The couple had a child in 1985, Ato Ibáñez, who himself has since gone on to represent Sweden in race walking. The couple were later divorced. She had a second child in 1990, Perseus Karlström, who also became a professional racewalker.

Gustavsson continued on as a walker and was the over-45 European Indoor champion in 2005 and broke the over-50s world record in the indoor 3000 m in 2012.

== National titles ==
- Swedish Athletics Championships
  - 3000 m walk: 1977, 1978
  - 5000 m walk: 1977, 1981, 1983, 2000, 2004
  - 10 km walk: 1976, 1977, 1978, 1984, 1995, 1999
  - 20 km walk: 1995, 2002

== International competitions ==
Year	Competition	Venue	Position	Event	Notes
1975	IAAF World Race Walking Cup (unofficial)	Le Grand-Quevilly, France	2nd	5 km walk	24:33
1975	IAAF World Race Walking Cup (unofficial)	Le Grand-Quevilly, France	2nd	Team	70 pts
1977	IAAF World Race Walking Cup (unofficial)	Milton Keynes, United Kingdom	1st	5 km walk	23:19
1981	IAAF World Race Walking Cup	Valencia, Spain	1st	5 km walk	22:56.9
1981	IAAF World Race Walking Cup	Valencia, Spain	2nd	Team	104 pts
1983	IAAF World Race Walking Cup	Bergen, Norway	5th	10 km walk	46:21
1983	IAAF World Race Walking Cup	Bergen, Norway	4th	Team	118 pts
1986	European Championships	Stuttgart, West Germany	3rd	10 km walk	46:19

== Notes ==
- ^{nb} Variations on her name include Siv Gustafsson, Siw Ibáñez, Siv Vera-Ibanez, Siw Ybañez and Siw Karlström.
