= Britt Holmquist =

Swedish racewalker

Medal record

Women's athletics

Representing Sweden

IAAF World Race Walking Cup
Bronze medal – third place	1975 Grand-Quevilly	5 km walk

Britt Holmquist is a Swedish former racewalking athlete. She was twice a competitor at the IAAF World Race Walking Cup and was the bronze medallist in the first ever women's race in 1975. She was part of a Swedish medal sweep alongside Margareta Simu and Siv Gustavsson. While both Simu and Gustavsson returned to the podium at the 1977 edition, Holmquist fell back to fifth behind British opposition.

Nationally, she won twice at the Swedish Athletics Championships, taking the 3000 metres race walk titles in 1974 and 1980. She also competed at the AAA Championships in 1980, taking third place in the 5000 m walk behind Britain's Irene Bateman and Swedish compatriot Gustavsson. Holmquist's highest global seasonal ranking was third, which she achieved in the 10,000 m walk in 1980. She was twice a regional medallist, taking third at the Nordic Indoor Race Walking Championships in 1974 and being runner-up to Gustavsson at the 1977 Nordic Race Walking Championships.

== International competitions ==
Year	Competition	Venue	Position	Event	Notes
1975	IAAF World Race Walking Cup	Grand-Quevilly, France	3rd	5 km walk	24:45
1977	IAAF World Race Walking Cup	Milton Keynes, United Kingdom	5th	5 km walk	24:27

== National titles ==
- Swedish Athletics Championships
  - 3000 m walk: 1974, 1980
