= Marion Fawkes =

British racewalker (born 1948)

Personal information
- Nationality: British (English)
- Born: 3 December 1948 (age 77) Cumberland, England

Sport
- Sport: Athletics
- Event: racewalking
- Club: North Shields
Medal record
Representing Great Britain
Women's Athletics
IAAF World Race Walking Cup
| Gold medal – first place | 1979 | 5 km walk |

Marion Fawkes (born 3 December 1948) is a British former racewalker. She was the first official female world champion in racewalking, through her victory at the 1979 IAAF World Race Walking Cup. She broke four world records in her career.

== Biography ==
Fawkes, from North Shields, was unusual for a racewalker in that she stood at 4 foot 11 inches (1.50 m). She joined her local athletics club in 1966 and soon began taking part in regional competitions. Women's walking was still at a very early stage of development and there were no officially sanctioned major championships for female athletes. She was an amateur athlete and maintained a full-time job in the British civil service to support her sporting career.

The Women's Amateur Athletic Association (WAAA) held walks from 1960 onwards, and it was at these events that Fawkes established herself. After a runner-up finish to Betty Jenkins in the 3000 m walk at the 1973 WAAA Championships, she topped the podium in the 6.5 km (4-mile) event at the WAAA Senior Road Walking Championships.

The following year she beat Jenkins on the track by over half a minute to become British 3000 metres walk champion and retained her road walk title. She dropped back down the order in 1975, being runner-up to Ginney Lovell in the 5000 m walk and losing to Judy Farr at the road event. In 1976, she was reduced to third behind Farr and Carol Tyson. She began to perform better on the track, including three WAAA wins over 5000 m between 1976 and 1979, as well as a win over 10,000 m in 1979. At 48:37.6 minutes, the latter performance remained a championship record for a decade. She took on and beat Norway's champion walker, Thorill Gylder, at the Nordic Race Walking Championships that same year.

The peak of Fawkes' competitive career came at the 1979 IAAF World Race Walking Cup. It was the first time that a women's race was officially sanctioned at the competition, and Fawkes defeated her compatriot, Carol Tyson, to become the first ever global champion in women's racewalking. Her winning time of 22:51 minutes for the five-kilometre road walk was a new world record. Fawkes had competed at the 1975 IAAF World Race Walking Cup (sixth) and 1977 IAAF World Race Walking Cup (failed to finish), but these were invitational events and not part of the official programme.

Fawkes also won the women's European Economic Community walking championship in 1979. Her walking career wound down after that point as she chose to start a family, although she had managed to set 23 British records, seven European records and four world records in the preceding four years. She continued to compete in the sport at a lower level and set a masters athletics world record over 10,000 m in 1989. She took a greater focus on coaching young walkers and officiated in her later years.
