= 1975 IAAF World Race Walking Cup =

- Organisers: IAAF
- Edition: 7th
- Date: October 11–12
- Host city: Le Grand-Quevilly, Haute-Normandie, France
- Events: 2 + 1 invited
- Participation: 71 + 38 guest athletes from 9 + 5 guest nations

The 1975 IAAF World Race Walking Cup was held in Le Grand-Quevilly, France, on October 11–12, 1975. The event was also known as Lugano Trophy. For the first time, there was a women's 5 km race held as invitation event.

Complete results were published.

== Medallists ==
Event	Gold		Silver		Bronze	
Men
20 km walk	Karl-Heinz Stadtmüller (GDR)	1:26:12	Bernd Kannenberg (FRG)	1:26:20	Peter Frenkel (GDR)	1:26:54
50 km walk	Yevgeniy Lyungin (URS)	4:03:42	Gerhard Weidner (FRG)	4:09:58	Vladimir Svechnikov (URS)	4:11:31
Lugano Cup (Men)
Team (Men)	Soviet Union	117 pts	East Germany	105 pts	West Germany	102 pts
Women^{†}
5 km walk^{†}	Margareta Simu (SWE)	23:40	Siv Gustavsson (SWE)	24:33	Britt Holmquist (SWE)	24:45
Team (Women)^{†}
Team (Women)^{†}	Sweden	70 pts	United Kingdom	46 pts	France	42 pts

^{†}: Invitation event.

== Results ==
=== Men's 20 km ===
Place	Athlete	Nation	Time
1st place, gold medalist(s)	Karl-Heinz Stadtmüller	East Germany (GDR)	1:26:12
2nd place, silver medalist(s)	Bernd Kannenberg	West Germany (FRG)	1:26:20
3rd place, bronze medalist(s)	Peter Frenkel	East Germany (GDR)	1:26:54
4	Otto Barch	Soviet Union (URS)	1:27:35
5	Vittorio Visini	Italy (ITA)	1:27:38
6	Brian Adams	Great Britain (GBR)	1:27:46
7	Aleksey Troitskiy	Soviet Union (URS)	1:27:59
8	Olly Flynn	Great Britain (GBR)	1:28:08
9	Yevgeniy Ivchenko	Soviet Union (URS)	1:28:39
10	Mikhail Alekseyev	Soviet Union (URS)	1:28:58
11	Hans-Georg Reimann	East Germany (GDR)	1:29:03
12	Armando Zambaldo	Italy (ITA)	1:29:29
13	Imre Stankovics	Hungary (HUN)	1:29:55
14	Gérard Lelièvre	France (FRA)	1:30:18
15	Domenico Carpentieri	Italy (ITA)	1:30:25
16	Hartwig Gauder	East Germany (GDR)	1:30:37
17	Amos Seddon	Great Britain (GBR)	1:30:42
18	János Tábori	Hungary (HUN)	1:30:53
19	Bengt Simonsen	Sweden (SWE)	1:31:13
20	Göran Aneheim	Sweden (SWE)	1:31:57
21	Sandro Bellucci	Italy (ITA)	1:33:03
22	Alain Moulinet	France (FRA)	1:33:17
23	Daniel Björkgren	Sweden (SWE)	1:33:27
24	Heinz Mayr	West Germany (FRG)	1:33:40
25	Owe Hemmingsson	Sweden (SWE)	1:33:49
26	Bob Kitchen	United States (USA)	1:34:15
27	László Sátor	Hungary (HUN)	1:34:48
28	Roger Mills	Great Britain (GBR)	1:35:23
29	Dominique Guebey	France (FRA)	1:35:42
30	Bernhard Schmidt	West Germany (FRG)	1:37:26
31	Wayne Glusker	United States (USA)	1:38:07
32	Helmut Stolte	West Germany (FRG)	1:39:15
33	Michel Leveque	France (FRA)	1:42:41
—	Sándor Forian	Hungary (HUN)	DQ
—	Jerry Brown	United States (USA)	DQ
—	John Knifton	United States (USA)	DQ

=== Men's 50 km ===
Place	Athlete	Nation	Time
1st place, gold medalist(s)	Yevgeniy Lyungin	Soviet Union (URS)	4:03:42
2nd place, silver medalist(s)	Gerhard Weidner	West Germany (FRG)	4:09:58
3rd place, bronze medalist(s)	Vladimir Svechnikov	Soviet Union (URS)	4:11:31
4	John Warhurst	Great Britain (GBR)	4:14:35
5	Franco Vecchio	Italy (ITA)	4:15:33
6	Ferenc Danovsky	Hungary (HUN)	4:15:59
7	Heinrich Schubert	West Germany (FRG)	4:16:11
8	Werner Galina	East Germany (GDR)	4:16:30
9	Hans Binder	West Germany (FRG)	4:18:08
10	Jean-Pierre Garcia	France (FRA)	4:19:35
11	Max Sjöholm	Sweden (SWE)	4:21:10
12	János Dalmati	Hungary (HUN)	4:21:48
13	Paolo Grecucci	Italy (ITA)	4:23:55
14	Olaf Pilarski	East Germany (GDR)	4:24:59
15	Roy Thorpe	Great Britain (GBR)	4:26:48
16	Hans Michalski	West Germany (FRG)	4:27:31
17	Stig-Olof Elovsson	Sweden (SWE)	4:29:03
18	Lennart Lundgren	Sweden (SWE)	4:30:05
19	Alec Banyard	Great Britain (GBR)	4:30:25
20	Charley Fogg	Great Britain (GBR)	4:31:15
21	August Hirt	United States (USA)	4:31:19
22	Mirko Scussel	Italy (ITA)	4:36:11
23	Luc Gauthier	France (FRA)	4:39:48
24	Claude Sauriat	France (FRA)	4:47:05
25	Karoly Orban	Hungary (HUN)	4:55:37
26	Tom Knatt	United States (USA)	5:01:10
27	Paul Eddig	United States (USA)	5:15:08
—	Didier David	France (FRA)	DQ
—	Ralf Knütter	East Germany (GDR)	DQ
—	Matthias Kroel	East Germany (GDR)	DQ
—	Kåre Moen	Sweden (SWE)	DQ
—	Veniamin Soldatenko	Soviet Union (URS)	DQ
—	Lajos Lanyl	Hungary (HUN)	DNF
—	Rosario Valore	Italy (ITA)	DNF
—	Ray Somers	United States (USA)	DNF

=== Team (men) ===
The team rankings, named Lugano Trophy, combined the 20km and 50km events team results.

Place	Country	Points
1st place, gold medalist(s)	Soviet Union	117 pts
2nd place, silver medalist(s)	East Germany	105 pts
3rd place, bronze medalist(s)	West Germany	102 pts
4	United Kingdom	102 pts
5	Italy	100 pts
6	Hungary	76 pts
7	Sweden	69 pts
8	France	59 pts
9	United States	24 pts

=== Women's 5 km^{†} ===
Place	Athlete	Nation	Time
1st place, gold medalist(s)	Margareta Simu	Sweden (SWE)	23:40
2nd place, silver medalist(s)	Siv Gustavsson	Sweden (SWE)	24:33
3rd place, bronze medalist(s)	Britt Holmquist	Sweden (SWE)	24:45
4	Thorill Gylder	Norway (NOR)	25:05
5	Sue Brodock	United States (USA)	25:07
6	Marion Fawkes	Great Britain (GBR)	25:12
7	Elisabet Olsson	Sweden (SWE)	28:14
8	Monika Karlsson	Sweden (SWE)	28:14
9	Karin Møller	Denmark (DEN)	26:00
10	Ginney Lovell	Great Britain (GBR)	26:05
11	Monika Glöckler	West Germany (FRG)	26:16
12	Nadine Mogis	France (FRA)	26:17
13	Jeanine Piroux	France (FRA)	26:22
14	Dominique Terraz	France (FRA)	26:22
15	Mia Kjølberg	Norway (NOR)	26:34
16	Margot Vetterli	Switzerland (SUI)	26:45
17	Marica Zethof	Netherlands (NED)	26:53
18	Sylvia Saunders/Black	Great Britain (GBR)	27:05
19	Heike Penner	West Germany (FRG)	27:12
20	Laila Nielsen	Denmark (DEN)	27:22
21	Gerd Gylder	Norway (NOR)	27:32
22	Becky Villalvaso	United States (USA)	27:35
23	Tina Thomsen	Denmark (DEN)	27:38
24	Regine Broders	West Germany (FRG)	27:44
25	Eileen Smith	United States (USA)	27:50
26	Ulla Kristiansen	Denmark (DEN)	27:59
27	Sandy Briscoe	United States (USA)	28:14
28	Fröydis Hilsen	Norway (NOR)	28:17
29	Edith Häppt	Switzerland (SUI)	28:35
30	Anne Fröberg	Finland (FIN)	29:12
31	Olivia Lorenz	West Germany (FRG)	29:18
32	Chantal Vallée	France (FRA)	30:09
33	Adri van Dirven	Netherlands (NED)	32:50
—	Jacqueline Delassaux	France (FRA)	DQ
—	Judy Farr	Great Britain (GBR)	DQ
—	Cynthia Johnson	United States (USA)	DQ
—	Lisa Metheny	United States (USA)	DQ
—	Jacoba Kemna	Netherlands (NED)	DNF

^{†}: Invitation event.

=== Team (women)^{†} ===
Place	Country	Points
1st place, gold medalist(s)	Sweden	70 pts
2nd place, silver medalist(s)	United Kingdom	46 pts
3rd place, bronze medalist(s)	France	42 pts
4	Norway	40 pts
5	Denmark	31 pts
6	West Germany	29 pts
7	United States	26 pts
8	Netherlands	14 pts

^{†}: Invitation event.

== Participation ==
The participation of 109 athletes (71 men/38 women) from 14 countries is reported.

- Denmark (-/4)
- East Germany (8/-)
- Finland (-/1)
- France (8/5)
- Hungary (8/-)
- Italy (8/-)
- Netherlands (-/3)
- Norway (-/4)
- Soviet Union (7/-)
- Sweden (8/5)
- Switzerland (-/2)
- United Kingdom (8/4)
- United States (8/6)
- West Germany (8/4)

== Qualifying rounds ==
From 1961 to 1985 there were qualifying rounds for the men's competition with the first two winners proceeding to the final. This year, the German Democratic Republic, the Soviet Union, Italy, the United States, and France proceeded directly to the final.

Countries qualifying for the final are highlighted in green

=== Zone 1 ===
Odense, Denmark, September 20/21

Rank	Nation	Points
1	United Kingdom	90 pts
2	Sweden	80 pts
3	Poland	74 pts
4	Belgium	53 pts
5	Norway	23 pts
6	Denmark	18 pts

=== Zone 2 ===
Štětí, Czechoslovakia, September 20

Rank	Nation	Points
1	Hungary	65 pts
2	West Germany	53 pts
3	Czechoslovakia	49 pts
4	Romania	43 pts
5	Spain	32 pts

== See also ==
- 1975 Race Walking Year Ranking
