= Vladimir Svechnikov =

Soviet racewalker

Medal record

Men's athletics

Representing the Soviet Union

IAAF World Race Walking Cup
Bronze medal – third place	1975 Le Grand-Quevilly	50 km walk

Vladimir Svechnikov (born 11 June 1945) is a former Soviet racewalking athlete who specialised in the 50 kilometres race walk. He competed at two editions of the IAAF World Race Walking Cup. At the 1973 IAAF World Race Walking Cup he placed tenth and on his return two years later at the 1975 race he took the bronze medal behind fellow Soviet Yevgeniy Lyungin and West Germany's Gerhard Weidner. At national level, he was overshadowed during his career by walkers such as Veniamin Soldatenko and Otto Barch.

== International competitions ==
Year	Competition	Venue	Position	Event	Notes
1973	IAAF World Race Walking Cup	Lugano, Switzerland	10th	50 km walk	4:11:22
1975	IAAF World Race Walking Cup	Le Grand-Quevilly, France	3rd	50 km walk	4:11:31
