= World Athletics Race Walking Team Championships =

Racewalking event

- Status: active
- Genre: Racewalking competitions
- Date: various
- Frequency: biannual
- Location: various
- Inaugurated: 1961
- Organiser: World Athletics

The World Athletics Race Walking Team Championships is a racewalking event organised by World Athletics. It has been held since 1961, and generally on a biennial basis. The first women's edition of the event happened in 1979. It was formerly known as the Lugano Cup after the city that hosted the first event, then became the IAAF World Race Walking Cup until 2016 and then IAAF World Race Walking Team Championships until 2018. In 2004, a junior division was added for athletes between 16 and 20. Since 2008 it has been a constituent meeting of the World Athletics Challenge – Race Walking.

From 1975 to 1997 was awarded Lugano Trophy for combined team (20K + 50K). Since 1993 the medals have been awarded for the single events of the 20K and 50K teams, therefore in the 1993, 1995 and 1997 editions three team medals were assigned, from 1999 the combined was abolished and the team medals remained two until the present day.

== Host cities ==
Year	City	Country
1961	Lugano	Switzerland
1963	Varese	Italy
1965	Pescara	Italy
1967	Bad Saarow	East Germany
1970	Eschborn	West Germany
1973	Lugano	Switzerland
1975	Grand-Quevilly	France
1977	Milton Keynes	United Kingdom
1979	Eschborn	West Germany
1981	Valencia	Spain
1983	Bergen	Norway
1985	St John's, Isle of Man	Isle of Man
1987	New York City	United States
1989	L'Hospitalet	Spain
1991	San Jose	United States
1993	Monterrey	Mexico
1995	Beijing	China
1997	Poděbrady	Czech Republic
1999	Mézidon-Canon	France
2002	Turin	Italy
2004	Naumburg	Germany
2006	La Coruña	Spain
2008	Cheboksary	Russia
2010	Chihuahua	Mexico
2012	Saransk	Russia
2014	Taicang	China
2016	Rome	Italy
2018	Taicang	China
~~2020~~	Cancelled due to the COVID-19 pandemic	
2022	Muscat	Oman
2024	Antalya	Turkey
2026	Brasília	Brazil

The 2016 Cup was due to be held in Cheboksary, Russia. However the IAAF's suspension of the All-Russia Athletic Federation prohibits Russia from hosting international competitions. This event was relocated.

The 2020 Championships, planned in Minsk, Belarus, was postponed due to the COVID-19 pandemic. World Athletics announce Oman to host 2022 Race during 2020 Summer Olympics.

== Events ==
Event	Individual	Team	First	Last
Men's 20 km individual	28		1961	2018
Men's 20 km team		14	1993	2022
Men's 35 km	1	1	2022	2022
Men's 10 km (junior)	9	9	2004	2022
Women's 20 km individual	11		1999	2022
Women's 20 km team		21	1979	2022
Women's 35 km	1	1	2022	2022
Women's 10 km (junior)	9	9	2004	2022
Defunct events
Men's 50 km individual	28		1961	2018
Men's 50 km team		13	1993	2018
Women's 5 km individual	4		1975	1981
Women's 10 km individual	8		1983	1997
Women's 50 km	1	1	2018	2018
	95			

== Championships records ==
Key: Defunct event

=== Men ===
Event	Record	Athlete	Nationality	Date	Meet	Place	Ref.
20 km	1:18:15	Paquillo Fernández	Spain	10 May 2008	2008	Cheboksary, Russia	
35 km	2:36:14	Perseus Karlstrom	Sweden	5 March 2022	2022	Muscat, Oman	
50 km	3:34:14	Denis Nizhegorodov	Russia	11 May 2008	2008	Cheboksary, Russia	
10 km (Junior event)	39:40	Gao Wenkui	China	3 May 2014	2014	Taicang, China	

=== Women ===
Event	Record	Athlete	Nationality	Date	Meet	Place	Ref.
5 km	22:51	Marion Fawkes	Great Britain	29/30 September 1979	1979	Eschborn, West Germany	
10 km	41:52	Irina Stankina	Russia	19 April 1997	1997	Poděbrady, Czech Republic	
20 km	1:25:42	Olga Kaniskina	Russia	11 May 2008	2008	Cheboksary, Russia	
35 km	2:48:33	Glenda Morejón	Ecuador	5 March 2022	2022	Muscat, Oman	
50 km	4:04:36	Liang Rui	China	5 May 2018	2018	Taicang, China	
10 km (Junior event)	42:44	Tatyana Kalmykova	Russia	10 May 2008	2008	Cheboksary, Russia	

== Medal summary ==
Legend: Where there is the symbol

, the original top three result has been adjusted due to doping disqualifications.

=== Men ===
==== 20 km ====
Year	Gold		Silver		Bronze	
Year	Athlete	Country	Athlete	Country	Athlete	Country
1961	Ken Matthews	United Kingdom	Lennart Back	Sweden	George Williams	United Kingdom
1963	Ken Matthews	United Kingdom	Paul Nihill	United Kingdom	Antal Kiss	Hungary
1965	Dieter Lindner	East Germany	Antal Kiss	Hungary	Gerhard Sperling	East Germany
1967	Nikolay Smaga	USSR	Vladimir Golubnichiy	USSR	Ron Laird	United States
1970	Hans-Georg Reimann	East Germany	Vladimir Golubnichiy	USSR	Peter Frenkel	East Germany
1973	Hans-Georg Reimann	East Germany	Karl-Heinz Stadtmüller	East Germany	Ron Laird	United States
1975	Karl-Heinz Stadtmüller	East Germany	Bernd Kannenberg	West Germany	Peter Frenkel	East Germany
1977	Daniel Bautista	Mexico	Domingo Colín	Mexico	Karl-Heinz Stadtmüller	East Germany
1979	Daniel Bautista	Mexico	Boris Yakovlev	USSR	Nikolay Vinnichenko	USSR
1981	Ernesto Canto	Mexico	Roland Wieser	East Germany	Alessandro Pezzatini	Italy
1983	Jozef Pribilinec	Czechoslovakia	Ernesto Canto	Mexico	Anatoliy Solomin	USSR
1985	José Marín	Spain	Maurizio Damilano	Italy	Victor Mostovic	USSR
1987	Carlos Mercenario	Mexico	Viktor Mostovik	USSR	Anatoliy Gorshkov	USSR
1989	Frants Kostyukevich	USSR	Mikhail Shchennikov	USSR	Yevgeniy Misyulya	USSR
1991	Mikhail Shchennikov	USSR	Ernesto Canto	Mexico	Thierry Toutain	France
1993	Daniel García	Mexico	Valentí Massana	Spain	Alberto Cruz	Mexico
1995	Li Zewen	China	Mikhail Shchennikov	Russia	Bernardo Segura	Mexico
1997	Jefferson Pérez	Ecuador	Daniel García	Mexico	Ilya Markov	Russia
1999	Bernardo Segura	Mexico	Yu Guohui	China	Vladimir Andreyev	Russia
2002	Jefferson Pérez	Ecuador	Vladimir Andreyev	Russia	Alejandro López	Mexico
2004	Jefferson Pérez	Ecuador	Robert Korzeniowski	Poland	Nathan Deakes	Australia
2006	Paquillo Fernández	Spain	Jefferson Pérez	Ecuador	Han Yucheng	China
2008	Paquillo Fernández	Spain	Valeriy Borchin	Russia	Eder Sánchez	Mexico
2010	Wang Hao	China	Zhu Yafei	China	Andrey Krivov	Russia
2012	Wang Zhen	China	Andrey Krivov	Russia	Vladimir Kanaykin	Russia
2014	Ruslan Dmytrenko	Ukraine	Cai Zelin	China	Andrey Ruzavin	Russia
2016	Wang Zhen	China	Cai Zelin	China	Álvaro Martín	Spain
2018	Kōki Ikeda	Japan	Wang Kaihua	China	Massimo Stano	Italy
2022	Toshikazu Yamanishi	Japan	Koki Ikeda	Japan	Samuel Gathimba	Kenya
2024	Perseus Karlström	Sweden	Paul McGrath	Spain	Diego García	Spain

==== 35 km ====
Year	Gold		Silver		Bronze	
Year	Athlete	Country	Athlete	Country	Athlete	Country
2022	Perseus Karlström	Sweden	Alvaro Martin	Spain	Miguel Angel Lopez	Spain

==== 50 km ====
Year	Gold		Silver		Bronze	
Year	Athlete	Country	Athlete	Country	Athlete	Country
1961	Abdon Pamich	Italy	Don Thompson	United Kingdom	Åke Söderlund	Sweden
1963	István Havasi	Hungary	Ray Middleton	United Kingdom	Ingvar Pettersson	Sweden
1965	Christoph Höhne	East Germany	Burkhard Leuschke	East Germany	Abdon Pamich	Italy
1967	Christoph Höhne	East Germany	Peter Selzer	East Germany	Aleksandr Shcherbina	USSR
1970	Christoph Höhne	East Germany	Veniamin Soldatenko	USSR	Burkhard Leuschke	East Germany
1973	Bernd Kannenberg	West Germany	Otto Barch	USSR	Christoph Höhne	East Germany
1975	Yevgeniy Lyungin	USSR	Gerhard Weidner	West Germany	Vladimir Svechnikov	USSR
1977	Raúl González	Mexico	Pedro Aroche	Mexico	Paolo Grecucci	Italy
1979	Martín Bermúdez	Mexico	Enrique Vera	Mexico	Viktor Dorovskikh	USSR
1981	Raúl González	Mexico	Hartwig Gauder	East Germany	Sandro Bellucci	Italy
1983	Raúl González	Mexico	Sergey Yung	USSR	Viktor Dorovskikh	USSR
1985	Hartwig Gauder	East Germany	Andrey Perlov	USSR	Axel Noack	East Germany
1987	Ronald Weigel	East Germany	Hartwig Gauder	East Germany	Dietmar Meisch	East Germany
1989	Simon Baker	Australia	Andrey Perlov	USSR	Stanislav Vezhel	USSR
1991	Carlos Mercenario	Mexico	Simon Baker	Australia	Ronald Weigel	Germany
1993	Carlos Mercenario	Mexico	Jesús Ángel García	Spain	Germán Sánchez	Mexico
1995	Zhao Yongsheng	China	Jesús Ángel García	Spain	Valentin Kononen	Finland
1997	Jesús Ángel García	Spain	Oleg Ishutkin	Russia	Valentin Kononen	Finland
1999	Sergey Korepanov	Kazakhstan	Tomasz Lipiec	Poland	Nikolay Matyukhin	Russia
2002	Aleksey Voyevodin	Russia	German Skurygin	Russia	Tomasz Lipiec	Poland
2004	Aleksey Voyevodin	Russia	Yu Chaohong	China	Yuriy Andronov	Russia
2006	Denis Nizhegorodov	Russia	Trond Nymark	Norway	Yuriy Andronov	Russia
2008	Denis Nizhegorodov	Russia	Alex Schwazer	Italy	Trond Nymark	Norway
2010	Matej Tóth	Slovakia	Horacio Nava	Mexico	Jared Tallent	Australia
2012	Jared Tallent	Australia	Si Tianfeng	China	Christopher Linke	Germany
2014	Mikhail Ryzhov	Russia	Ivan Noskov	Russia	Jared Tallent	Australia
2016	Jared Tallent	Australia	Ihor Hlavan	Ukraine	Marco De Luca	Italy
2018	Hirooki Arai	Japan	Hayato Katsuki	Japan	Satoshi Maruo	Japan

In 2008, Vladimir Kanaykin from Russia was initially 2nd and silver medallist in 3:36:55, but disqualified because of doping violations.
In 2012, original gold medallist Sergey Kirdyapkin, Igor Erokhin original silver medallist and fourth-placer Sergey Bakulin all from Russia, had their times and placings annulled due to doping violations. In 2016, Alex Schwazer from Italy was initially 1st and gold medallist, but disqualified because of doping violations.

==== Lugano Trophy ====
Team ranking that combining results of 20 km and 50 km.

Year	Gold	Silver	Bronze
1961	United Kingdom 53	Sweden 53	Italy 28
1963	United Kingdom 93	Hungary 64	Sweden 63
1965	East Germany 117	United Kingdom 87	Hungary 64
1967	East Germany 128	Soviet Union 107	United Kingdom 104
1970	East Germany 134	Soviet Union 125	West Germany 88
1973	East Germany 139	Soviet Union 134	Italy 104
1975	Soviet Union 117	East Germany 105	West Germany 102
1977	Mexico 185	East Germany 180	Italy 160
1979	Mexico 240	Soviet Union 235	East Germany 201
1981	Italy 227	Soviet Union 227	Mexico 221
1983	Soviet Union 231	Italy 189	Mexico 146
1985	East Germany 234	Soviet Union 234	Italy 233
1987	Soviet Union 607	Italy 569	East Germany 518
1989	Soviet Union 585	Italy 534	France 516
1991	Italy 517	Germany 491	Mexico 487
1993	Mexico 540	Spain 491	Italy 487
1995	Mexico 846	Italy 815	China 805
1997	Russia 865	Mexico 802	Belarus 801

==== Teams 20 km ====
Year	Gold	Silver	Bronze
1993	Mexico 265	Italy 244	Spain 240
1995	China 436	Italy 422	Mexico 420
1997	Russia 431	Belarus 413	Mexico 403
1999	Russia 19	Mexico 28	China 29
2002	Russia 24	Belarus 28	Italy 34
2004	China 18	Ecuador 35	Italy 35
2006	Spain 33	Australia 37	Russia 37
2008	Russia 11	Spain 22	Australia 47
2010	China 9	Russia 25	Mexico 41
2012	China 14	Ukraine 15	Australia 56
2014	Ukraine 18	China 23	Japan 35
2016	China 16	Canada 27	Ecuador 41
2018	Japan 12	Italy 29	China 42
2022	Ecuador 25	Japan 26	China 45
2024	Spain 13	Japan 26	Italy 33

==== Teams 35 km ====
Year	Gold	Silver	Bronze
2022	Spain 16	China 29	Germany 48

==== Teams 50 km ====
Year	Gold	Silver	Bronze
1993	Mexico 275	Spain 251	France 245
1995	Mexico 426	Russia 419	Spain 413
1997	Russia 434	Slovakia 415	Spain 407
1999	Russia 14	Spain 26	Germany 55
2002	Russia 7	France 59	China 78
2004	Russia 8	China 14	Spain 23
2006	Spain 20	Poland 38	China 39
2008	Italy 28	Mexico 29	Spain 30
2010	China 21	Mexico 22	Russia 38
2012	China 28	Ukraine 31	Mexico 43
2014	Ukraine 19	China 34	Spain 70
2016	Italy 14	Ukraine 25	Spain 30
2018	Japan 10	Ukraine 29	Poland 37

=== Women ===
==== 5 km ====
Year	Gold		Silver		Bronze	
Year	Athlete	Country	Athlete	Country	Athlete	Country
1975^{†}	Margareta Simu	Sweden	Siv Gustavsson	Sweden	Britt Holmquist	Sweden
1977^{†}	Siv Gustavsson	Sweden	Carol Tyson	United Kingdom	Margareta Simu	Sweden
1979	Marion Fawkes	United Kingdom	Carol Tyson	United Kingdom	Thorill Gylder	Norway
1981	Siv Gustavsson	Sweden	Aleksandra Derevinskaya	USSR	Lyudmila Khrushcheva	USSR

^{†} Invitational, non-cup event.

==== 10 km ====
Year	Gold		Silver		Bronze	
Year	Athlete	Country	Athlete	Country	Athlete	Country
1983	Xu Yongjiu	China	Natalya Sharipova	USSR	Sue Cook	Australia
1985	Yan Hong	China	Guan Ping	China	Olga Krishtop; Aleksandra Grigoryeva	USSR; USSR
1987	Olga Krishtop	USSR	Irina Strakhova	USSR	Jin Bingjie	China
1989	Beate Anders	East Germany	Kerry Saxby	Australia	Ileana Salvador	Italy
1991	Irina Strakhova	USSR	Graciela Mendoza	Mexico	Yelena Sayko	USSR
1993	Wang Yan	China	Sari Essayah	Finland	Yelena Nikolayeva	Russia
1995	Gao Hongmiao	China	Yelena Nikolayeva	Russia	Liu Hongyu	China
1997	Irina Stankina	Russia	Olimpiada Ivanova	Russia	Gu Yan	China

==== 20 km ====
Year	Gold		Silver		Bronze	
Year	Athlete	Country	Athlete	Country	Athlete	Country
1999	Liu Hongyu	China	Natalya Fedoskina	Russia	Norica Cîmpean	Romania
2002	Erica Alfridi	Italy	Olimpiada Ivanova	Russia	Natalya Fedoskina	Russia
2004	Yelena Nikolayeva	Russia	Jiang Jing	China	María Vasco	Spain
2006	Ryta Turava	Belarus	Olimpiada Ivanova	Russia	Irina Petrova	Russia
2008	Olga Kaniskina	Russia	Tatyana Sibileva	Russia	Vera Santos	Portugal
2010	María Vasco	Spain	Vera Santos	Portugal	Ines Henriques	Portugal
2012	Elena Lashmanova	Russia	María José Poves	Spain	Xiuzhi Lu	China
2014	Anisya Kirdyapkina	Russia	Liu Hong	China	Elmira Alembekova	Russia
2016	Maria Guadalupe González	Mexico	Qieyang Shenjie	China	Érica de Sena	Brazil
2018	Maria Guadalupe González	Mexico	Qieyang Shenjie	China	Yang Jiayu	China
2022	Ma Zhenxia	China	Yang Jiayu	China	Kimberly García	Peru
2024	Kimberly García	Peru	Ma Zhenxia	China	Érica de Sena	Brazil

==== 35 km ====
Year	Gold		Silver		Bronze	
Year	Athlete	Country	Athlete	Country	Athlete	Country
2022	Glenda Morejón	Ecuador	Li Maocuo	China	Katarzyna Zdziebło	Poland

==== 50 km ====
Year	Gold		Silver		Bronze	
Year	Athlete	Country	Athlete	Country	Athlete	Country
2018	Liang Rui	China	Yin Hang	China	Claire Tallent	Australia

==== Teams 20 km ====
* Invitation event

Year	Gold	Silver	Bronze
1975*	Sweden 70	Great Britain & NI 46	France 42
1977	No team contest		
1979	Great Britain & NI 85	Sweden 74	Norway 69
1981	USSR 105	Sweden 104	Australia 90
1983	PR of China 132	USSR 130	Australia 126
1985	PR of China 104	USSR 98	Canada 74
1987	USSR 203	Spain 174	Australia 167
1989	USSR 218	PR of China 212	Italy 203
1991	USSR 203	Italy 180	Mexico 162
1993	Italy 196	PR of China 193	Russia 193
1995	PR of China 443	Italy 427	Russia 424
1997	Russia 440	Italy 435	PR of China 425
1999	PR of China 13	Russia 16	Mexico 54
2002	Russia 9	Italy 26	Romania 42
2004	PR of China 18	Russia 28	Romania 41
2006	Russia 10	PR of China 19	Belarus 25
2008	Russia 7	Portugal 24	Spain 38
2010	Portugal 13	Spain 22	PR of China 32
2012	Spain 16	Russia 27	PR of China 32
2014	Russia 8 PR of	China 22	Portugal 36
2016	PR of China 14	Australia 40	Colombia 58
2018	PR of China 17	Italy 38	Spain 40
2022	PR of China 10	Greece 30	India 61
2024	China 15	Peru 15	Spain 31

==== Teams 35 km ====
Year	Gold	Silver	Bronze
2022	Ecuador 12	Spain 28	China 29

==== Teams 50 km ====
Year	Gold	Silver	Bronze
2018	China 8	Ecuador 21	Ukraine 40

== Mixed ==
=== Mixed relay ===
Year	Gold	Silver	Bronze
2024	Italy 2:56:45	Japan 2:57:04	Spain 2:57:47

== Medal table ==
=== Individual overall ===
Men and women senior and junior only individual events update to 2024 edition.

Rank	Nation	Gold	Silver	Bronze	Total
1	China	26	26	12	64
2	Russia	15	16	19	50
3	Mexico	15	11	8	34
4	Germany	11	8	10	29
5	Spain	7	11	10	28
6	Soviet Union	6	13	13	32
7	Italy	6	8	10	24
8	Japan	6	6	4	16
9	Ecuador	6	3	1	10
10	Sweden	5	2	4	11
11	Australia	4	3	8	15
12	Great Britain	3	5	1	9
13	Colombia	3	0	0	3
14	Ukraine	2	2	0	4
15	Peru	2	1	1	4
16	Hungary	1	1	1	3
17	Belarus	1	0	0	1
17	Czechoslovakia	1	0	0	1
17	Kazakhstan	1	0	0	1
17	Slovakia	1	0	0	1
21	Poland	0	2	2	4
22	Finland	0	1	3	4
23	Norway	0	1	2	3
23	Portugal	0	1	2	3
25	Ethiopia	0	1	0	1
26	Brazil	0	0	4	4
27	United States	0	0	2	2
28	Czech Republic	0	0	1	1
28	France	0	0	1	1
28	Guatemala	0	0	1	1
28	India	0	0	1	1
28	Kenya	0	0	1	1
28	Romania	0	0	1	1
Totals (33 entries)		122	122	123	367

=== Individual senior ===
Rank	Nation	Gold	Silver	Bronze	Total
1	Mexico	14	8	5	27
2	China	13	16	6	35
3	Germany	11	8	10	29
4	Russia	10	12	12	34
5	Soviet Union	6	13	13	32
6	Spain	6	6	6	18
7	Sweden	5	2	4	11
8	Ecuador	4	1	0	5
9	Great Britain	3	5	1	9
10	Japan	3	4	1	8
11	Italy	3	2	8	13
12	Australia	3	2	5	10
13	Ukraine	1	2	0	3
14	Hungary	1	1	1	3
14	Peru	1	1	1	3
16	Belarus	1	0	0	1
16	Czechoslovakia	1	0	0	1
16	Kazakhstan	1	0	0	1
16	Slovakia	1	0	0	1
20	Poland	0	2	2	4
21	Finland	0	1	2	3
21	Norway	0	1	2	3
21	Portugal	0	1	2	3
24	Brazil	0	0	2	2
24	United States	0	0	2	2
26	France	0	0	1	1
26	Kenya	0	0	1	1
26	Romania	0	0	1	1
Totals (28 entries)		88	88	88	264

=== Individual junior ===
Rank	Nation	Gold	Silver	Bronze	Total
1	China	10	9	4	23
2	Russia	5	4	7	16
3	Colombia	3	0	0	3
4	Spain	1	3	2	6
5	Mexico	1	2	3	6
6	Italy	1	1	1	3
7	Australia	1	0	1	2
8	Japan	0	2	1	3
9	Ecuador	0	1	0	1
10	Czech Republic	0	0	1	1
10	Finland	0	0	1	1
10	Guatemala	0	0	1	1
Totals (12 entries)		22	22	22	66

== Doping ==
The competition conducts doping tests on participating athletes and several have been disqualified from the races as a result. Ukraine's Olga Leonenko became the first doping disqualification, having originally finished seventh in 1995. Daniel Plaza became the first man in 1997 and was again disqualified in 1999. Nine years passed without incident then in 2008 two Russians were excluded Viktor Burayev and Vladimir Kanaykin – the latter was the first athlete to be stripped of a medal at the cup.

In 2010 fourth place Erik Tysse was removed. Four athletes were disqualified for doping at the 2012 edition: silver medallist Igor Yerokhin was the most prominent, followed by fifth place Sergey Morozov, then Turkish walkers Recep Çelik and Handan Koçyiğit Cavdar. Yuriy Andronov became the fifth Russian to be caught doping at the event in 2014.

Outside of the event, several medallists have been later disqualified for doping, including women's winners Olga Kaniskina and Elena Lashmanova, and men's runners-up Valeriy Borchin and Alex Schwazer.

== See also ==
- European Race Walking Cup
- Pan American Race Walking Cup
- South American Race Walking Championships
- Asian Race Walking Championships
- Oceania Race Walking Championships
- Central American Race Walking Championships
