= Sue Cook (race walker) =

Australian former racewalking athlete

Sue Cook née Orr
Personal information
- Nationality: Australian
- Born: 23 April 1958 (age 68)

Sport
- Sport: Athletics
- Event: Race Walking
Medal record
Representing Australia
Women's Athletics
IAAF World Race Walking Cup
Bronze medal – third place	1983 Bergen	10 km walk

Sue Cook, née Orr (born 23 April 1958) is an Australian former racewalking athlete. She is a former world record holder in the 10 kilometres race walk and the 20 kilometres race walk. She competed six times at the IAAF World Race Walking Cup, taking bronze in 1983, and was selected for Australia for the 1987 World Championships in Athletics.

== Biography ==
Cook grew up in a sporting family – her father was a veteran-category runner while her older sister Jenny represented Australia at the 1972 Summer Olympics and set a long-standing national record in the 1500 metres. Her nephew, Daniel McConnell, was later an Olympic cyclist.

A key figure in the early years of international women's walking, Cook wong the British WAAA Championships title at the 1982 WAAA Championships and took two titles at the IWF World Championships and was a six-time participant at the IAAF World Race Walking Cup. Her best finish at the latter event was a bronze medal at the first holding of the 10 kilometres race walk, finishing behind Xu Yongjiu and Natalya Sharipova. She also represented Australia at the 1987 World Championships in Athletics and 1987 IAAF World Indoor Championships.

Cook broke a series of world records which were later recognised by the International Association of Athletics Federations. She completed the 20 kilometres race walk in 1:41:42 hours in 1980 to knock over a minute and a half off the previous mark set by Thorill Gylder. Cook greatly advanced the sport by breaking the 20 km walk world record three further times, taking it down to 1:39:31 hours, 1:36:36 hours, and finally 1:36:23 hours in 1984. Her last record stood for only ten days at which point her national rival Sally Pierson bettered the time. Cook and Pierson also exchanged the 10 km walk world record, with Cook setting 46:28 minutes in 1980, Pierson going to 45:38 minutes in 1982, then Cook claiming it back with 45:32 minutes the following month.

She won thirteen national titles at the Australian Athletics Championships, taking wins from 3000 m up to the 20 km walk. She was also the 1982 winner of the 5000 metres walk at the AAA Championships and the 1983 winner of the 10 km walk at the Canadian Track and Field Championships.

== International competitions ==
Year	Competition	Venue	Position	Event	Notes
1979	IAAF World Race Walking Cup	Eschborn, West Germany	6th	5 km walk	23:10.11
1980	IWF World Championships	New York City, United States	1st	5 km walk	23:39
1981	IAAF World Race Walking Cup	Valencia, Spain	7th	5 km walk	24:04
1982	IWF World Championships	Bergen, Norway	1st	5 km walk	23:03
1983	IAAF World Race Walking Cup	Bergen, Norway	3rd	10 km walk	45:26
1984	IWF World Championships	Lomello, Italy	—	5 km walk	DNF
1985	IAAF World Race Walking Cup	St John's, Isle of Man	14th	10 km walk	48:17
1987	World Indoor Championships	Indianapolis, United States	15th	3000 m walk	13:45
1987	IAAF World Race Walking Cup	New York City, United States	13th	10 km walk	46:03
1987	World Championships	Rome, Italy	12th	10 km walk	46:20
1991	IAAF World Race Walking Cup	San Jose, United States	59th	10 km walk	51:29

== National titles ==
- Australian Athletics Championships
  - 3000 m walk: 1977
  - 5000 m walk: 1978, 1980, 1981, 1984, 1985
  - 10 km walk: 1977, 1979, 1980, 1981, 1982, 1983
  - 20 km walk: 1990
- AAA Championships
  - 5000 m walk: 1982
- Canadian Track and Field Championships
  - 10 km walk: 1983

== See also ==
- List of Australian athletics champions (women)

Records
Preceded by Thorill Gylder	Women's 20 km walk world record holder 3 February 1980 – 17 July 1984	Succeeded by Sally Pierson
Preceded by Thorill Gylder; Sally Pierson	Women's 10 km walk world record holder 11 May 1980 – 8 May 1982; 10 June 1982 – 24 September 1983	Succeeded by Sally Pierson; Young Juxu
