= Thorill Gylder =

Norwegian racewalker (born 1958)

Medal record

Women's athletics

Representing Norway

IAAF World Race Walking Cup
Bronze medal – third place	1979 Eschborn	5 km walk

Thorill Gylder (born 5 May 1958) is a Norwegian female former racewalking athlete and speaker. A member of Vansjø/Svinndal IL sports club, she competed from the mid-1970s to the early 1980s. She competed three times at the IAAF World Race Walking Cup and after a fourth-place finish in 1975 she took the 5 km walk bronze medal in 1979.

She broke several world records in walking during her career. She took the 20 kilometres walk world record with a time of 1:43:20 hours in 1978. This stood for nearly two years until it was beaten by Sue Cook. She twice broke the 10 km walk world record, setting a time of 48:40 minutes in 1978 before knocking over a minute off that with 47:24 minutes in 1979. Sue Cook was again the athlete to better Gylder's record, doing so in 1980. She also broke the 5000 metres race walk world record at Bislett Stadium in 1978.

Gylder gained her first international experiences at regional level. She was a minor medallist at junior level at the Nordic Race Walking Championships in 1973 and 1975, behind Sweden's Siv Gustavsson and Monica Karlsson. She took her first senior medal at the competition (a bronze) in 1975 behind Swedes Margareta Simu and Elisabeth Olsson –this made her only the second Norwegian to medal after 1971 winner Thorhild Sarpebakken. She also took a silver medal indoors in the 3000 m walk at the 1978 Nordic Indoor Race Walking Championships, with Simu again topping the podium.

Gylder was the dominant female walker nationally during her career, taking six consecutive 5000 metres race walk titles from 1975 to 1980 and seven straight titles in the 10 kilometres race walk discipline. Her victories followed on from those of her sister, Gerd Gylder, who was also an international walker for Norway.

== International competitions ==
Year	Competition	Venue	Position	Event	Notes
1975	IAAF World Race Walking Cup	Le Grand-Quevilly, France	4th	5 km walk	25:05
1975	Nordic Race Walking Championships	Odense, Denmark	3rd	5 km walk	25:34
1976	Nordic Indoor Race Walking Championships	Östersund, Sweden	3rd	3000 m junior walk	15:21
1977	Nordic Race Walking Championships	Helsinki, Finland	3rd	5 km walk	24:09
1978	Nordic Indoor Race Walking Championships	Turku, Finland	2nd	3000 m walk	13:58.3
1979	IAAF World Race Walking Cup	Eschborn, West Germany	3rd	5 km walk	23:08
1979	Nordic Race Walking Championships	Härnösand, Sweden	2nd	10,000 m walk	49:55
1981	IAAF World Race Walking Cup	Valencia, Spain	—	5 km walk	DNF

== National titles ==
- Norwegian Athletics Championships
  - 5000 m walk: 1975, 1976, 1977, 1978, 1979, 1980
  - 10 km walk: 1975, 1976, 1977, 1978, 1979, 1980, 1981

Records
Preceded by Lilian Harpur	Women's 20 km walk world record holder 23 April 1978 – 3 February 1980	Succeeded by Sue Cook
Preceded by Margareta Simu	Women's 10 km walk world record holder 16 September 1978 – 11 May 1980	Succeeded by Sue Cook
