= Judy Farr =

Judy Farr may refer to:

- Judy Farr (set decorator), British set decorator
- Judi Farr (1938–2023), Australian actress
- Judy Farr (racewalker) in 1975 IAAF World Race Walking Cup
- Judy Farr (figure skater) in New Zealand Figure Skating Championships
- Judith Farr, writer, winner of Rose Mary Crawshay Prize
