= Women's 10 kilometres walk world record progression =

The following table shows the world record progression in the women's 10 kilometres walk, as recognised by the IAAF.

== World record progression ==
Time	Athlete	Date	Place
58:14	Albertine Regel (FRA)	1926-11-11	Paris, France
56:26	Margit Lindström (SWE)	1934-10-07	Stockholm, Sweden
53:17	Sandrah Holm (SWE)	1935-05-19	Uppsala, Sweden
52:56	Birgit Frisk (SWE)	1942-06-21	Almunge, Sweden
51:14	May Holmén (SWE)	1942-08-09	Mariestad, Sweden
51:11	Stina Lindberg (SWE)	1942-08-23	Gävle, Sweden
51:01	Margareta Simu (SWE)	1972-06-24	Äppelbo, Sweden
49:04	Margareta Simu (SWE)	1976-06-22	Äppelbo, Sweden
48:53	Margareta Simu (SWE)	1978-06-25	Äppelbo, Sweden
48:40	Thorill Gylder (NOR)	1978-09-16	Søfteland, Norway
47:24	Thorill Gylder (NOR)	1979-09-15	Valer, Norway
46:28	Sue Orr (AUS)	1980-05-11	Moss, Norway
45:38	Sally Pierson (AUS)	1982-05-08	Melbourne, Australia
45:32	Susan Cook (AUS)	1982-06-10	Canberra, Australia
45:14	Young Juxu (CHN)	1983-09-24	Bergen, Norway
44:52	Olga Krishtop (URS)	1984-08-05	Penza, Soviet Union
44:14	Yan Hong (CHN)	1985-03-16	Jian, PR China
43:22	Olga Krishtop (URS)	1987-05-03	New York City, United States
42:52	Kerry Saxby (AUS)	1987-05-04	Melbourne, Australia
41:30	Kerry Saxby (AUS)	1988-08-27	Canberra, Australia
41:29	Larisa Ramazanova (RUS)	1995-06-04	Izhevsk, Russia
41:04	Yelena Nikolayeva (RUS)	1996-04-20	Sochi, Russia

== See also ==
- Men's 10 kilometres walk world record progression
