= Lyudmila Khrushcheva =

Russian racewalker (born 1955)

Personal information
- Born: 30 December 1955 (age 70)

Sport
- Sport: Racewalking
Medal record
Representing the Soviet Union
World Cup
Gold medal – first place	1981 Valencia	Team
Bronze medal – third place	1981 Valencia	5 km

Lyudmila Vladimirovna Khrushcheva (Russian: Людмила Владимировна Хрущева; born 30 December 1955) is a Russian racewalker. As a senior, she won two medals at the 1981 World Cup and held world records in the 5 km and 10 km events. She later won five world titles in the masters category.
