= Paolo Grecucci =

Italian former racewalking athlete (born 1952)

Personal information
- Nationality: Italian
- Born: February 2, 1952 (age 74)

Sport
- Country: Italy
- Sport: Athletics
- Event: Race walk
Medal record
IAAF World Race Walking Cup
Gold medal – first place	1981 Valencia	Combined Team
Silver medal – second place	1983 Bergen	Combined Team
Bronze medal – third place	1977 Milton Keynes	50 km walk
Bronze medal – third place	1977 Milton Keynes	Combined Team

Paolo Grecucci (born 2 February 1952) is an Italian former racewalking athlete. He was a five-time participant at the IAAF World Race Walking Cup and was a bronze medallist in the 50 kilometres race walk at the event in 1977.

== Biography ==
Grecucci twice competed for Italy at the European Athletics Championships (1978 and 1982) with his best placing being 15th. Following the event being dropped form the Olympic programme the 1976 World Championships in Athletics was held for 50 km walk and Grecucci was Italy's best performer in seventh place.

At national level, he was twice the 50 km walk winner at the Italian Athletics Championships.

== International competitions ==
Representing Italy
Year	Competition	Venue	Position	Event	Notes
1975	World Race Walking Cup	Le Grand-Quevilly, France	13th	50 km walk	4:23:55
1976	World Championships	Malmö, Sweden	7th	50 km walk	4:04:59
1977	World Race Walking Cup	Milton Keynes, United Kingdom	3rd	50 km walk	4:06:27
1978	European Championships	Prague, Czechoslovakia	15th	50 km walk	4:05:46.8
1979	World Race Walking Cup	Eschborn, West Germany	9th	50 km walk	3:50:51
1981	World Race Walking Cup	Valencia, Spain	19th	50 km walk	4:18:56
1982	European Championships	Athens, Greece	—	50 km walk	DNF
1983	World Race Walking Cup	Bergen, Norway	7th	50 km walk	3:57:14

== National titles ==
- Italian Athletics Championships
  - 50 km walk: 1976, 1978
