= Margareta Simu =

Swedish racewalker (born 1953)

Medal record

Women's athletics

Representing Sweden

IAAF World Race Walking Cup
Gold medal – first place	1975 Grand-Quevilly	5 km walk
Bronze medal – third place	1977 Milton Keynes	5 km walk

Margareta Simu (born 2 May 1953 in Västerås) is a Swedish former racewalking athlete. She competed three times at the IAAF World Race Walking Cup and was the winner in 1975 and bronze medallist in 1977. On her last appearance in 1979 she placed eighth.

Simu broke world racewalking records several times. She set a 10 km walk world record of 51:01 minutes in 1972, finally improving on Stina Lindberg's near-30-year-old time. She bettered this to 49:04 minutes in 1976 and again to 48:53 minutes in 1978. Norwegian Thorill Gylder took that honour away from her in 1978 with a new best of 48:40 minutes. Simu's time of 1:47:10 hours, set in 1973, was a 20 km walk world record for nearly four years. She also broke the world indoor record for the 3000 m on four occasions (between 1974 and 1978).

Simu was a three-time medallist at the Nordic Race Walking Championships, wither her best result being a gold medal in 1975. She was twice champion at the short-lived Nordic Indoor Race Walking Championships, topping the podium in the 3000 m walk in 1974 and 1978, as well as taking bronze behind Siv Gustafsson and Elisabeth Olsson in 1976. She was a seven-time Swedish national champion in racewalking, at distances from 3000 m to 10 km.

== International competitions ==
Year	Competition	Venue	Position	Event	Notes
1971	Nordic Race Walking Championships	Gothenburg, Sweden	2nd	5000 m walk	26:15
1973	Nordic Race Walking Championships	Fredrikstad, Norway	3rd	5000 m walk	25:52
1974	Nordic Indoor Race Walking Championships	Turku, Finland	1st	3000 m walk	14:51.7
1975	Nordic Race Walking Championships	Odense, Denmark	1st	5 km walk	23:43
1975	IAAF World Race Walking Cup	Grand-Quevilly, France	1st	5 km walk	23:40
1976	Nordic Indoor Race Walking Championships	Östersund, Sweden	3rd	3000 m walk	14:48
1977	IAAF World Race Walking Cup	Milton Keynes, United Kingdom	3rd	5 km walk	24:12
1978	Nordic Indoor Race Walking Championships	Turku, Finland	1st	3000 m walk	13:46.1
1979	IAAF World Race Walking Cup	Eschborn, West Germany	8th	5 km walk	23:48

== National titles ==
- Swedish Athletics Championships
  - 3000 m walk: 1971, 1975
  - 5000 m walk: 1974, 1975, 1976
  - 10 km walk: 1974, 1975

Records
Preceded by Stina Lindberg	Women's 10 km walk world record holder 24 June 1972 – 16 September 1978	Succeeded by Thorill Gylder
Preceded by Irma Hansson	Women's 20 km walk world record holder 22 September 1973 – 16 July 19776	Succeeded by Lilian Harpur
