= Lugano Trophy (World Race Walking Cup) =

Lugano Trophy, set up in 1961 at the occasion of the first edition of the IAAF World Race Walking Cup, so in the Lugano 1961 edition, represented the team rankings that combined the 20 km race walk and 50 km race walk events. It was held until 1997 and since 1993 two different team rankings were drawn for 20 km and for 50 km, so for three editions (1993, 1995 and 1997), three titles were assigned for team race.

== Podium ==
Until 1985, the first 4 classifieds of each nation were ranked for team ranking since 1987. In any case, the medals were awarded to the participants, although they did not finish the race.

Year	Gold	Silver	Bronze
1961	United Kingdom 53	Sweden 53	Italy 28
1963	United Kingdom 93	Hungary 64	Sweden 63
1965	East Germany 117	United Kingdom 87	Hungary 64
1967	East Germany 128	Soviet Union 107	United Kingdom 104
1970	East Germany 134	Soviet Union 125	West Germany 88
1973	East Germany 139	Soviet Union 134	Italy 104
1975	Soviet Union 117	East Germany 105	West Germany 102
1977	Mexico 185	East Germany 180	Italy 160
1979	Mexico 240	Soviet Union 235	East Germany 201
1981	Italy 227	Soviet Union 227	Mexico 221
1983	Soviet Union 231	Italy 189	Mexico 146
1985	East Germany 234	Soviet Union 234	Italy 233
1987	Soviet Union 607	Italy 569	East Germany 518
1989	Soviet Union 585	Italy 534	France 516
1991	Italy 517	Germany 491	Mexico 487
1993	Mexico 540	Spain 491	Italy 487
1995	Mexico 846	Italy 815	China 805
1997	Russia 865	Mexico 802	Belarus 801

== See also ==
- IAAF World Race Walking Cup
- Memorial Mario Albisetti
