= Yoshio Morikawa =

Japanese racewalker

Personal information
- Nationality: Japanese
- Born: 23 December 1945 (age 80)

Sport
- Sport: Athletics
- Event: Racewalking
Medal record
Men's athletics
Representing Japan
Asian Championships
Gold medal – first place	1973 Marikina	20 km walk

Yoshio Morikawa (森川 嘉男, Morikawa Yoshio; born 23 December 1945) is a Japanese racewalker. He competed in the men's 20 kilometres walk at the 1976 Summer Olympics.
