= Carol Tyson =

British racewalker (1957–2005)

Personal information
- Nationality: British (English)
- Born: 15 December 1957 Cumberland, England
- Died: 12 June 2005 (aged 47)

Sport
- Sport: Athletics
- Event: racewalking
Medal record
Representing Great Britain
Women's Athletics
IAAF World Race Walking Cup
| Silver medal – second place | 1977 Milton Keynes | 5 km walk |
| Silver medal – second place | 1979 Eschborn | 5 km walk |

Carol Tyson (15 December 1957 – 12 June 2005) was a British racewalking athlete. She was a three-time competitor at the IAAF World Race Walking Cup and was twice a silver medallist.

== Biography ==
Born to Jack and Peggy Tyson, both medical doctors, she attended Keswick School as a boarder and took up racewalking while there. Women's walking was in its early stages of development and, with Marion Fawkes, Tyson was a leading athlete for Great Britain.

Tyson claimed national titles at the 5 km and 5000 m distances in her early twenties, including two titles at the UK Athletics Championships. She was also twice British 5000 metres walk champion, winning at the 1978 WAAA Championships and 1981 WAAA Championships and twice British 10,000 metres walk champion, winning at the 1978 WAAA Championships and 1980 WAAA Championships.

She began to study medicine at King's College London but continued to compete in the sport. She entered an invitational 5 km women's race at the 1977 IAAF World Race Walking Cup. Contested mainly between British and Swedish athletes, Tyson placed second behind Siv Gustavsson. The event was upgraded to an official one for the 1979 IAAF World Race Walking Cup and Tyson formed a British 1–2 with Marion Fawkes, helping the British women to the Eschborn Cup team title. Her third and final outing at the 1981 IAAF World Race Walking Cup brought more modest results, with Tyson in 19th place. She also won the top level Coppa Città di Sesto San Giovanni race in 1981.

After retiring from racewalking due to an Achilles tendon injury, she worked as a paediatrician in New Zealand, London, Great Yarmouth and finally at Perth Royal Infirmary. She died suddenly at the age of 47 after having breathing difficulties. She left a daughter.

== International competitions ==
| Year | Competition | Venue | Position | Event | Notes |
|---|---|---|---|---|---|
| 1977 | IAAF World Race Walking Cup | Milton Keynes, United Kingdom | 2nd | 5 km walk | 23:46 |
| 1979 | IAAF World Race Walking Cup | Eschborn, West Germany | 2nd | 5 km walk | 22:59 |
| 1981 | IAAF World Race Walking Cup | Valencia, Spain | 19th | 5 km walk | 25:10.9 |

== National titles ==
- UK Athletics Championships
  - 5000 m walk: 1980, 1981
- WAAA Women's Road Walk Championships
  - 5 km walk: 1977, 1978, 1980
- Women's AAA Championships
  - 5000 m walk: 1978, 1981
  - 10,000 m walk: 1978, 1980
