= Äppelbo =

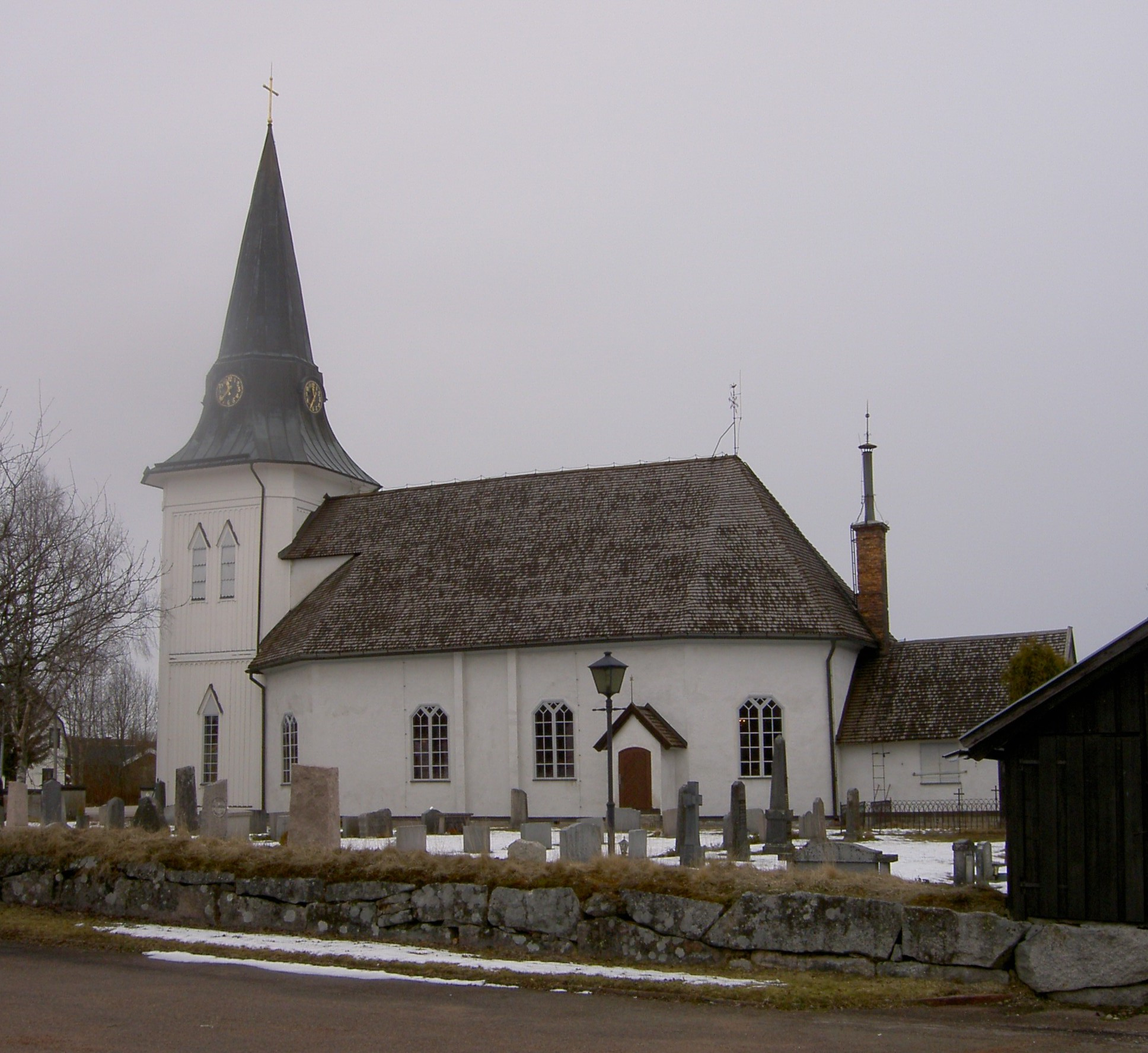
- Äppelbo Church

- Location within Dalarna Location within Sweden
- Coordinates: 60°29′N 14°01′E
- Country: Sweden
- Province: Dalarna
- County: Dalarna County
- Municipality: Vansbro Municipality

Area
  - Total: 1.03 km^{2} (0.40 sq mi)

Population (31 December 2010)
  - Total: 258
  - Density: 250/km^{2} (650/sq mi)
- Time zone: UTC+1 (CET)
  - Summer (DST): UTC+2 (CEST)
- Climate: Dfc

Äppelbo is a locality situated in Vansbro Municipality, Dalarna County, Sweden with 258 inhabitants in 2010.
