= Pyotr Pochynchuk =

Medal record

Men's athletics

Representing Soviet Union

European Championships
| Silver medal – second place | 1978 Prague | 20 km walk |

Pyotr Ivanovich Pochynchuk (Belarusian: Пётр Іванавіч Пачынчук; Russian: Пётр Иванович Починчук) (July 26, 1954 – December 1, 1991) was a Soviet athlete who mainly competed in the men's 20 kilometer walk during his career. Born in Lyakhovichi, Brest Oblast, he trained at the Armed Forces sports society in Grodno.

He competed for the USSR at the 1980 Summer Olympics held in Moscow, Soviet Union where he won the silver medal in the men's 20 kilometer walk competition.

== International competitions ==
| Year | Competition | Venue | Position | Event | Notes |
Representing Soviet Union
| 1978 | European Championships | Prague, Czechoslovakia | 2nd | 20 km | 1:23:43.0 |
| 1980 | Olympic Games | Moscow, Soviet Union | 2nd | 20 km | 1:24:45.4 |
| 1981 | World Race Walking Cup | Valencia, Spain | 8th | 20 km | 1:27:03 |
| 1982 | European Championships | Athens, Greece | 10th | 20 km | 1:30:13 |
| 1983 | World Championships | Helsinki, Finland | 13th | 20 km | 1:24:55 |
