= Michael Stones =

British gerontologist, psychologist, athlete

Michael John Stones
- Born: April 26, 1947; England
- Died: April 22, 2022 (Age 74)
- Occupations: Gerontologist, athlete and researcher
- Awards: Bayer Research Award, International Psychogeriatrics Association

Academic background
- Education: B.Tech., Psychology; Ph.D., Medicine
- Alma mater: Brunel University; University of Sheffield
- Thesis: The effects of sleep on human performance, learning and memory (1974)

Academic work
- Institutions: Memorial University of Newfoundland; Lakehead University

Michael John Stones (born April 26, 1947) was a British born geropsychologist, athlete and researcher. He is an Emeritus Professor at Lakehead University. Stones is best known in academia for his contributions to gerontology and has published several books, book chapters and over 140 scientific papers. He has primarily conducted research on psychological well-being, healthy aging, physical performance, elder abuse, sexuality, and the use of health informatics to promote quality of care in later life. His contributions to the arts include short stories and poems in literary journals.

== Early life and education ==
Stones completed his B.Tech. degree in Psychology from Brunel University in 1970 and earned his Ph.D. from the Faculty of Medicine in the University of Sheffield in 1974. He then moved to Canada the same year.

== Career ==
Before his emigration to Canada in 1974, Stones worked in clinical psychology departments at Fulbourn Hospital in Cambridge, St James's University Hospital in Leeds and at the Open University. In Canada, he went through the ranks of Assistant, Associate and Full Professor of Psychology at Memorial University of Newfoundland from 1974 till 1994. He was also Co-Director of the Gerontology Center at that University from 1984-1994. He then left Memorial University and was appointed by University of Waterloo as a Professor in the Faculty of Applied Health Sciences. During this period, he also served as Scientific Director of the University Institute of Social Gerontology of Quebec. In 1998, Stones joined Lakehead University as a Professor of Psychology. From 1998-2003, he was also Director of the Northern Educational Center for Aging and Health and Coordinator of the Gerontology Program. He was appointed Emeritus Professor after retirement in 2018.

Stones' article on "The Other Migrant Mother" was recognized by Don Nardo in his book Migrant Mother: How a Photograph Defined the Great Depression for contributing to the context and interpretation of Dorothea Lange's photograph.

== Research ==
Stones’ research falls within three main categories: subjective well-being and quality of life, health and safety in later life, and age trends in elite performances in Masters Athletics.

=== Subjective well-being, happiness and quality of life ===
Stones is best known for his research with colleague Albert Kozma. In 2003, the North American Happiness Show respectively ranked these authors 3rd and 4th in a listing of the world’s Top Happiness Researchers. Their research included the development and psychometric evaluation of a series of measures relevant to happiness and wellbeing. The most widely used measure is the Memorial University of Newfoundland Scale of Happiness (MUNSH), published in 1980. Translations of the MUNSH are used in many countries outside of North America and Europe (e.g., Bangladesh, Brazil, China, Chile, South Africa, South Korea), with subsequent studies attesting to its satisfactory psychometrics throughout the adult age range.

Chinese researchers report that although there are many good measures of subjective wellbeing, "only the MUNSH is particularly suitable for the elderly people."" The MUNSH also shows moderately high stability of happiness levels over prolonged periods of time, which is consistent with evidence for the influence of disposition on subjective well-being that render the latter "genetically indistinguishable from personality traits."

In addition to research on quality of life, Stones' engagement in community service activities include the creation and early administration of Seniors Resource Centres in the Canadian province of Newfoundland in 1990.

=== Elder abuse, caregiving and health informatics ===
During the 1990s, Stones began research on elder abuse, caregiving and health informatics. The main thrust of his elder abuse research is the study of differences between populations in beliefs and attitudes about abuse and neglect. Findings by Stones and Bedard (2002) are considered notable for two reasons: one of only two large-scale investigations of attitudinal differences between seniors and professionals; the inaugural comparison of attitudinal differences between seniors living in rural with urban locations. His research on caregiving mainly examines people with dementia. One study was recipient of a 1997 Bayer/International Psychogeriatrics Association (IPA) Research Award. Research on health informatics includes use of the home care, long-term care, palliative care and in-patient psychiatry versions of Resident Assessment Instruments (RAI). The RAI family of instruments is used world-wide for purposes of research, clinical caregiving and fiscal management.

=== Age trends among Master Athletes ===
Research on age trends among Master Athletes has significance for an understanding of human later life potential. Ray Fair notes that finding by Stones and Kozma on cross-sectional age trend in running performance are the first to report exponential age declines that are greater in longer runs than in the sprints. Bradley Young and Janet Starkes report that early studies by Stones and Kozma provide what became classical data analytic procedures for age trends in sport performance and describe the first comparisons of cross-sectional and longitudinal age trend - with lower decrement in longitudinal age trend. A later publication by Stones provides comprehensive discussion of research on age trends in sport during the preceding quarter-century and advocates the adoption of more advanced statistical modeling to differentiate between cross-sectional and longitudinal trend.

== Awards and honors ==
- 1979 - Gold medal in the USA national 1-hour race walk championship
- 1979 - First-place finish in the annual USA-Canada Racewalks
- 1981 - Finishing position in the International Amateur Athletic Federation (IAAF) World Race Walking Cup
- 1981 - Winner of the Poetry Section, Newfoundland Arts and Letters Competition
- 1984 - President’s Award for Outstanding Research, Memorial University of Newfoundland
- 1997 - Bayer Research Award, International Psychogeriatrics Association for "Associations Between Dysfunctional Behaviors, Gender, and Burden in Spousal Caregivers of Cognitively Impaired Older Adults"
- 2001- Senate Committee on Teaching and Learning Award at Lakehead University

== Publications ==
- Psychological Well-Being in Later Life (1991) ISBN 0-409-88911-3
- Sex May Be Wasted on the Young (1996) ISBN 978-1-895712-96-4
- Alzheimer Disease and Aggression: A Guide for Caregivers (1997) ISBN 978-1-896691-35-0
- Aging in Contemporary Canada (2003) ISBN 978-0-13-093752-0
- Stones, Michael J.; Baker, Joe (Feb 2020). "Modeling Human Potential Across the Lifespan". Frontiers in Psychology. 11: 106. doi:10.3389/fpsyg.2020.00106. ISSN 1664-8714. PMC 7010917. PMID 32116917.
