= Hans Tenggren =

Swedish racewalker

Personal information
- Nationality: Swedish
- Born: 26 September 1949 (age 76)

Sport
- Sport: Athletics
- Event: Racewalking

Hans Tenggren (born 26 September 1949) is a Swedish racewalker. He competed in the men's 50 kilometres walk at the 1972 Summer Olympics.
