= Domenico Carpentieri =

Italian racewalker

Personal information
- Nationality: Italian
- Born: 23 February 1946 (age 80) Bellegra, Italy

Sport
- Country: Italy
- Sport: Athletics
- Event: Race walk
- Club: Fiamme Gialle
Medal record
World Race Walking Cup
Gold medal – first place	1981 Valencia	Combined Team
Bronze medal – third place	1973 Lugano	Combined Team

Domenico Carpentieri (born 23 February 1946) was an Italian male racewalker who competed at the 1972 Summer Olympics.

== See also ==
- Italian team at the running events
- Italy at the IAAF World Race Walking Cup
