= Uwe Dünkel =

German racewalker (born 1960)

Uwe Dünkel (born 3 November 1960 in Gera, East Germany) is a German former racewalker who competed in the 1980 Summer Olympics.
