= Men's 10 kilometres walk world record progression =

The following table shows the world record progression in the men's 10 kilometres walk, as recognised by the IAAF.

== World record progression ==
Time	Athlete	Date	Place
39:36	José Marin (ESP)	6 May 1984	Bergen, Norway
39:07.38	Axel Noack (GDR)	10 July 1988	Neubrandenburg, East Germany (former GDR)
38:26.4	Daniel García (MEX)	17 May 1997	Sønder Omme, Danmark
37:50	Andreas Erm (GER)	27 May 2000	Berlin, Germany
37:11	Roman Rasskazov (RUS)	28 May 2000	Saransk, Russia

== See also ==
- Women's 10 kilometres walk world record progression
