= Yevgeniy Yevsyukov =

Yevgeniy Afanasyevich Yevsyukov (Russian: Евгений Афанасьевич Евсюков; born January 2, 1950, in Krasnoyarsk) is a retired race walker from Russia, who represented the Soviet Union at the 1980 Summer Olympics in Moscow, USSR. There he ended up in fourth place in the men's 20 km race, clocking 1:26.28,3.

== International competitions ==
Representing the Soviet Union
Year	Competition	Venue	Position	Event	Notes
1980	Olympic Games	Moscow, Soviet Union	4th	20 km	
1981	World Race Walking Cup	Valencia, Spain	4th	20 km	
1983	World Race Walking Cup	Bergen, Norway	5th	20 km	
1983	World Championships	Helsinki, Finland	3rd	20 km	
