= Allan Callow =

Australian rules footballer (1929–2023)

Personal information
- Full name: Allan Callow
- Born: 21 September 1929
- Died: 23 October 2023 (aged 94)
- Original team: Camden
- Height: 173 cm (5 ft 8 in)
- Weight: 71 kg (157 lb)

Playing career^{1}
Years	Club	Games (Goals)
1953–1956	St Kilda	32 (13)
- ^{1} Playing statistics correct to the end of 1956.

Allan Callow (21 September 1929 – 23 October 2023) was an Australian rules footballer who played for the St Kilda Football Club in the Victorian Football League (VFL). Callow died on 23 October 2023, at the age of 94.
