= Erik Söderlund =

Swedish racewalker

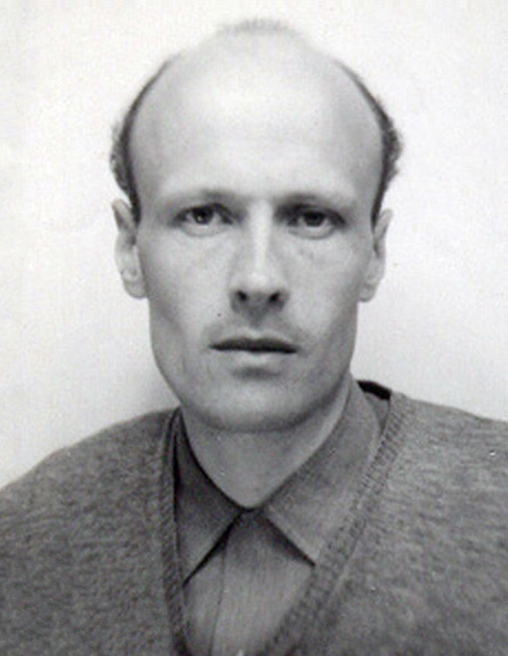

Personal information
- Born: 11 April 1925 Stockholm, Sweden
- Died: 27 July 2009 (aged 84) Västervik, Sweden
- Height: 182 cm (6 ft 0 in)
- Weight: 67 kg (148 lb)

Sport
- Sport: Athletics
- Event: Race walking
- Club: Stockholms GK

Achievements and titles
- Personal best: 50 kmW – 4:18:52 (1956)

Erik Napoleon Söderlund (11 April 1925 – 27 July 2009) was a Swedish race walker. He participated in the 50 km event at the 1960 Summer Olympics, but did not finish. He placed fifth over 20 km at the 1961 IAAF World Race Walking Cup, where his twin brother Åke secured a bronze medal in the 50 km walk.
