= Yevgeniy Lyungin =

Soviet racewalker

Medal record

Men's athletics

Representing the Soviet Union

IAAF World Race Walking Cup
Gold medal – first place	1975 Le Grand-Quevilly	50 km walk

Yevgeniy Lyungin (Russian: Евгений Люнгин; born 8 August 1938) is a former Soviet racewalker who competed in the 50 kilometres race walk distance. He became his country's first winner of the event at the IAAF World Race Walking Cup in 1975.

Born in Ligovo in Saint Petersburg, Lyungin first rose to prominence at national level with two national title wins, first over 50 km at the Soviet Athletics Championships in 1964, then over the much shorter 5000 m discipline in 1965 at the Soviet Indoor Athletics Championships. The former title win brought him selection for the 1964 Summer Olympics, where he finished in eighteenth place.

His major international debut came at the 1970 IAAF World Race Walking Cup held in Eschborn, West Germany. There he placed sixth in a time of 4:14:50 hours. He was mostly behind East German opposition but he and silver medallist Veniamin Soldatenko helped the Soviet Union to comfortably take the team silver medals.

On his return to the competition at the 1975 IAAF World Race Walking Cup he defeated all opponents by a margin of over six minutes, in a new best of 4:03:42 hours. Team mate (and one of the favourites) Soldatenko was disqualified for lifting. This performance made Lyungin the only Soviet man ever to win that title at the IAAF World Race Walking Cup. It was nearly a quarter of a century before a man from a former Soviet country topped the 50 km walk podium (Kazakhstan's Sergey Korepanov doing so in 1999). Lyungin was also the protagonist in the Soviet Union's first men's team title at the competition. At 37 years old, he remains the oldest person to have won the 50 km cup title.

Lyungin's third and final major international race was at the 1976 World Championships in Athletics – a one-off event following the dropping of the 50 km distance as an Olympic event. He ended the competition in sixth place and was the second highest ranked Soviet in the race, after the winner Soldatenko.

== National titles ==
- Soviet Athletics Championships
  - 50 km walk: 1964
- Soviet Indoor Athletics Championships
  - 5000 m walk: 1965

== International competitions ==
Representing the Soviet Union
Year	Competition	Venue	Position	Event	Notes
1964	Olympic Games	Tokyo, Japan	18th	50 km walk	4:32:01.6
1970	World Race Walking Cup	Eschborn, West Germany	6th	50 km walk	4:14:50
1970	World Race Walking Cup	Eschborn, West Germany	2nd	Team	125 pts
1975	World Race Walking Cup	Le Grand-Quevilly, France	1st	50 km walk	4:03:42
1975	World Race Walking Cup	Le Grand-Quevilly, France	1st	Team	117 pts
1976	World Championships	Malmö, Sweden	6th	50 km walk	4:04:36
