= Nordic Indoor Race Walking Championships =

- Sport: Racewalking
- Founded: 1974
- Ceased: 1978
- Country: Finland, Sweden, Norway, Denmark and Iceland

The Nordic Indoor Race Walking Championships (Norwegian: Nordisk mesterskap i kappgang innendørs) was a biennial one-day competition in indoor racewalking between athletes from the Nordic countries organised by Nordic Athletics. Established in 1974, it lasted for three editions before holding the last competition in 1978. The competition was held in February in even-numbered years, alternating with the Nordic Race Walking Championships held outdoors in odd-numbered years. Turku in Finland hosted the first and final editions, while Östersund in Sweden served as host for the second edition.

== Editions ==
Edition	Year	City	Country	Date	No. of athletes	No. of nations
1st	1974	Turku	Finland	23 February		
2nd	1976	Östersund	Sweden	15 February		
3rd	1978	Turku	Finland	4 February		
