= Vyacheslav Fursov =

Soviet racewalker

Personal information
- Nationality: Soviet
- Born: 19 July 1954 (age 71)

Sport
- Sport: Athletics
- Event: Racewalking

Vyacheslav Fursov (born 19 July 1954) is a Soviet racewalker. He competed in the men's 50 kilometres walk at the 1980 Summer Olympics.
