= Women's 20 kilometres walk world record progression =

The following table shows the world record progression in the women's 20 kilometres race walk, as recognised by the IAAF.

== World record progression ==
Time	Athlete	Date	Place	Ref.
2:24:00	Antonie Briksová (TCH)	1931-09-06	Prague, Czechoslovakia	
2:14:07	Antonie Odvárková (TCH)	1931-09-14	Prague, Czechoslovakia	
1:59:02	Lina Aebersold (SUI)	1934-06-09	Zürich, Switzerland	
1:57:35	Marie van Tonder (RSA)	1962-07-28	Cape Town, South Africa	
1:57:26	Irma Hansson (SWE)	1963-10-27	Copenhagen, Denmark	
1:54:30	Irma Hansson (SWE)	1967-10-22	Copenhagen, Denmark	
1:53:46	Karin Møller (DEN)	1968-10-27	Copenhagen, Denmark	
1:51:05	Irma Hansson (SWE)	1969-10-12	Copenhagen, Denmark	
1:47:10	Margareta Simu (SWE)	1973-09-22	Copenhagen, Denmark	
1:43:38	Lilian Harpur (AUS)	1977-07-16	Adelaide, Australia	
1:43:20	Thorill Gylder (NOR)	1978-04-23	Mixhuca, Mexico	
1:41:42	Susan Cook (AUS)	1980-02-03	Melbourne, Australia	
1:39:31	Susan Cook (AUS)	1981-12-20	Melbourne, Australia	
1:36:36	Susan Cook (AUS)	1982-12-19	Melbourne, Australia	
1:36:23	Susan Cook (AUS)	1984-07-07	Canberra, Australia	
1:36:19	Sally Pierson (AUS)	1984-07-17	Melbourne, Australia	
1:29:40	Kerry Saxby-Junna (AUS)	1988-05-13	Värnamo, Sweden	
1:27:30	Liu Hongyu (CHN)	1995-05-01	Beijing, China	
1:27:30	Nadezhda Ryashkina (RUS)	1999-02-07	Adler, Russia	
1:26:22	Wang Yan (CHN)	2001-11-19	Guangzhou, China	
1:25:41	Olimpiada Ivanova (RUS)	2005-08-07	Helsinki, Finland	
1:25:08	Vera Sokolova (RUS)	2011-02-26	Sochi, Russia	
1:25:02	Elena Lashmanova (RUS)	2012-08-11	London, England	
1:24:47	Elmira Alembekova (RUS)	2015-02-27	Sochi, Russia	
1:24:38	Liu Hong (CHN)	2015-06-06	A Coruña, Spain	
1:23:49	Yang Jiayu (CHN)	2021-03-20	Huangshan	

== See also ==
- Men's 20 kilometres walk world record progression
