= Bogusław Duda =

Polish racewalker

Personal information
- Full name: Bogusław Marek Duda
- Born: 18 July 1953 (age 72) Rzeszów, Poland
- Height: 178 cm (5 ft 10 in)
- Weight: 73 kg (161 lb)

Sport
- Country: Poland
- Sport: Athletics
- Event: Racewalking
- Club: WKS Flota Gdynia

Bogusław Marek Duda (born 18 July 1953) is a Polish racewalker. He competed in the men's 20 kilometres walk at the 1976 Summer Olympics.
