= Alf Brandt =

Swedish racewalker

Personal information
- Nationality: Swedish
- Born: 25 July 1958 (age 67)

Sport
- Sport: Athletics
- Event: Racewalking

Alf Brandt (born 25 July 1958) is a Swedish racewalker. He competed in the men's 20 kilometres walk at the 1980 Summer Olympics.
