= Roland Wieser =

Medal record

Men's athletics

Representing East Germany

European Championships
Gold medal – first place	1978 Prague	20 km walk

Roland Wieser (born 6 May 1956, in Zschopau) is an East German racewalker who won the bronze medal in the 20 kilometer walk during the 1980 Summer Olympics with a time of 1:25:59 hours. During his active career he measured 1.86 meters in height and 68 kg in weight.

Wieser's first success came at an early age, when he became the East German 10 kilometer walk Youth Champion in 1971. In 1975 he became the European Junior Champion in the same event. In 1978, Weiser competed in the East German National Championship and won the 50 kilometer walk; in the same year he achieved his first major success when he became the European Champion in the 20 kilometer walk at the elite level with a time of 1:23:11.5 hours. He followed this two years later with his Olympic bronze medal he had wona.

After his Olympic triumph Wieser did not win any additional medals in international competition. In 1982 he finished ninth in the European Championships, in 1983 he managed tenth in the World Championships, and in 1987 he retired from competitive walking.

After his retirement Wieser studied to become an auto mechanic, and later became a sports instructor at the Volkspolizei-Präsidium in Berlin. During these years he ran at the club level for SC Dynamo Berlin and trained under Max Weber.

== Achievements ==
Year	Competition	Venue	Position	Notes
Representing East Germany
1978	European Championships	Prague, Czechoslovakia	1st	20 km
1980	Olympic Games	Moscow, Soviet Union	3rd	20 km
1981	World Race Walking Cup	Valencia, Spain	2nd	20 km
1982	European Championships	Athens, Greece	9th	20 km
1983	World Championships	Helsinki, Finland	10th	20 km
1985	World Race Walking Cup	St John's, Isle of Man	4th	20 km

Records
Preceded by (Soviet Union) Anatoliy Solomin	Men's 20km Walk World Record Holder; August 30, 1978 – May 13, 1979	Succeeded by (Soviet Union) Vadim Tsvetkov
