= Nordic Race Walking Championships =

International race walking competition

- Sport: Racewalking
- Founded: 1957
- Country: Finland, Sweden, Norway, Denmark and Iceland

The Nordic Race Walking Championships (Norwegian: Nordisk mesterskap i kappgang) is an annual racewalking competition between athletes from the Nordic countries organised by Nordic Athletics. Established in 1957, it was a biennial competition until 2004. The events vary between road competitions and track competitions each edition. The 1975 and 1979 editions were open to non-Nordic athletes.

The championships features two senior races: a men's 20 kilometres race walk and a women's 10 kilometres race walk. There are also six further age category competitions: 20 km walk for under-23 men, 10 km walk for under-23 women and under-20 men, and 5 kilometres race walk for under-20 women and both sexes under-18. A men's 50 kilometres race walk event was held at the championships until 2010. The age category events were held as the Nordic Junior Race Walking Match from 1966 to 2003, before being folded into the main championships.

== Editions ==
- The 1959 course was short.

Year	Dates	Place	Country	Edition
1957	25 August	Gothenburg	Sweden	1
1959	29–30 August	Pori	Finland	2
1961	26–27 August	Copenhagen	Denmark	3
1963	24–25 August	Fredrikstad	Norway	4
1965	21–22 August	Örebro	Sweden	5
1967	9–10 September	Copenhagen	Denmark	6
1969	2–3 August	Taivassalo	Finland	7
1971	24–25 July	Gothenburg	Sweden	8
1973	10–11 August	Fredrikstad	Norway	9
1975	19–20 July	Odense	Denmark	10
1977	6–7 August	Helsinki	Finland	11
1979	8 July	Härnösand	Sweden	12
1981	25–26 July	Sistranda	Norway	13
1983	16 July	Copenhagen	Denmark	14
1985	7–8 September	Pori	Finland	15
1987	11–12 July	Gimo	Sweden	16
1989	28–29 April	Bergen	Norway	17
1992	26–27 September	Copenhagen	Denmark	18
1994	9–10 September	Stockholm	Sweden	19
1996	14–15 September	Espoo	Finland	20
1998	9 May	Bergen	Norway	21
2000	21–22 October	Vallensbæk	Denmark	22
2004	11 September	Stockholm	Sweden	23
2005	24 September	Odense	Denmark	24
2006	16 September	Turku	Finland	25
2007	8 June	Strandebarm	Norway	26
2008	13 September	Eskilstuna	Sweden	27
2009	5 September	Ballerup	Denmark	28
2010	4 September	Tuusula	Finland	29
2011	17 September	Halden	Norway	30
2012	15 September	Eskilstuna	Sweden	31
2013	Cancelled			
2014	13 September	Glostrup	Denmark	32
2015	29 August	Espoo	Finland	33
2016	17 September		Norway	34
2017	17 September	Stockholm	Sweden	35

== Medalists ==
=== Men's 20 km walk ===
Year	Gold		Silver		Bronze	
1957	Åke Söderlund (SWE)	1:36:09	Folke Zackrisson (SWE)	1:36:10	Erik Söderlund (SWE)	1:36:25
1959	Pentti Kallionpää (FIN)	1:32:42	Åke Söderlund (SWE)	1:32:46	Jan Nilsson (SWE)	1:33:39
1961	Lennart Back (SWE)	1:32:33	John Ljunggren (SWE)	1:34:07	Erik Söderlund (SWE)	1:34:44
1963	John Ljunggren (SWE)	1:34:20	Erik Söderlund (SWE)	1:35:33	Tommy Kristensen-Bjørnø (DEN)	1:36:46
1965	Göte Nygren (SWE)	1:39:11	Ole David Jensen (DEN)	1:39:59	Roine Karlsson (SWE)	1:40:38
1967	Åke Söderlund (SWE)	1:37:38	Göte Nygren (SWE)	1:39:44	Kjell Gunnarsson (SWE)	1:40:23
1969	Stefan Ingvarsson (SWE)	1:41:44	Daniel Björkgren (SWE)	1:47:12	Georg Davidsson (SWE)	1:47:30
1971	Hans Tenggren (SWE)	1:32:24t	Kåre Moen (SWE)	1:34:51t	Jan Rolstad (NOR)	1:37:24t
1973	Hans Tenggren (SWE)	1:33:06t	Ove Hemmingsson (SWE)	1:35:07t	Kjell Lund (NOR)	1:36:04t
1975	Gérard Lelièvre (FRA)	1:30:14	Jan Ornoch (POL)	1:31:17	Godfried Dejonckheere (BEL)	1:31:40
1977	Reima Salonen (FIN)	1:32:04	Bo Gustafsson (SWE)	1:32:22	Ove Hemmingsson (SWE)	1:33:55
1979	Matti Katila (FIN)	1:29:51	Leif Karlsson (SWE)	1:30:41	Alf Brandt (SWE)	1:32:40
1981	Erling Andersen (NOR)	1:29:00	Roland Nilsson (SWE)	1:29:50	Per Rasmussen (SWE)	1:31:50
1983	Bo Gustafsson (SWE)	1:21:38	Jan Staaf (SWE)	1:28:13	Per Rasmussen (SWE)	1:28:32
1985	Reima Salonen (FIN)	1:28:43	Bo Gustafsson (SWE)	1:28:48	Roland Nilsson (SWE)	1:32:24
1987	Jan Staaf (SWE)	1:28:22	Roland Nilsson (SWE)	1:28:52	Veijo Savikko (FIN)	1:29:17
1989	Erling Andersen (NOR)	1:29:25.6t	Jan Olsson (SWE)	1:29:33.3t	Pauli Pirjetä (FIN)	1:30:14.0t
1992	Valentin Kononen (FIN)	1:24:40.6t	Kari Ahonen (FIN)	1:25:42.4t	Magnus Morenius (SWE)	1:26:12.8t
1994	Valentin Kononen (FIN)	1:23:56.4t	Jani Lehtinen (FIN)	1:27:50.6t	Veijo Savikko (FIN)	1:33:39.4t
1996	Trond Nymark (NOR)	1:31:49.38t	Jacob Sørensen (DEN)	1:33:35.28t	Esa Kinnunen (FIN)	1:44:57.53t
1998	Birger Fält (SWE)	1:24:48.2t	Claus Jørgensen (DEN)	1:27:09.4t	Klaus David Jensen (DEN)	1:29:25.6t
2000	Bengt Bengtsson (SWE)	1:31:18	Erik Tysse (NOR)	1:32:17	Birger Fält (SWE)	1:33:33
2004	Bengt Bengtsson (SWE)	1:34:40.2t	Christer Svensson (SWE)	1:37:04.7t	Erling Andersen (NOR)	1:38:33.0t
2005	Trond Nymark (NOR)	1:27:59.7t	Bengt Bengtsson (SWE)	1:29:50.1t	Fredrik Svensson (SWE)	1:32:54.1t
2006	Erik Tysse (NOR)	1:20:56.5	Trond Nymark (NOR)	1:27:30.9	Antti Kempas (FIN)	1:28:48.9
2007	Erik Tysse (NOR)	1:22:03	Trond Nymark (NOR)	1:27:50	Jani Lehtinen (FIN)	1:37:46
2008	Fredrik Svensson (SWE)	1:29:55	Christer Svensson (SWE)	1:35:17	Timo Viljanen (FIN)	1:36:28
2009	Ato Ibáñez (SWE)	1:29:26.25	Fredrik Svensson (SWE)	1:35:48.74	Arne-Johan Martinsen (NOR)	1:36:10.21
2010	Antti Kempas (FIN)	1:29:34.03	Timo Viljanen (FIN)	1:34:27.53	Christer Svensson (SWE)	1:35:39.99
2011	Heikki Kukkonen (FIN)	1:24:07.52	Andreas Nielsen (DEN)	1:32:39.23	Timo Viljanen (FIN)	1:33:28.74
2012	Erik Tysse (NOR)	1:20:39	Ato Ibáñez (SWE)	1:22:36	Andreas Gustafsson (SWE)	1:23:20
2013	Cancelled					
2014	Ato Ibáñez (SWE)	1:24:53.20	Perseus Karlström (SWE)	1:29:39.52	Matias Korpela (FIN)	1:32:54.86
2015	Timo Viljanen (FIN)	1:38:39.3	Andreas Nielsen (DEN)	1:41:54.7	Christer Svensson (SWE)	1:43:05.0
2016	Anders Hansson (SWE)	1:25:52	Remo Kalström (SWE)	1:34:25	Timo Viljanen (FIN)	1:38:56
2017	Ato Ibáñez (SWE)	1:28:42.77	Anders Hansson (SWE)	1:29:01.68	Elmo Koivunen (FIN)	1:34:07.86
