= Domingo Colín =

Mexican racewalker

Domingo Colín (born 4 August 1952) is a Mexican former racewalker who competed in the 1976 Summer Olympics and in the 1980 Summer Olympics.
