= Karl-Heinz Stadtmüller =

East German race walker

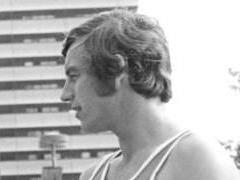
Stadtmüller, Montreal, 1976

Karl-Heinz Stadtmüller (20 January 1953 – 13 September 2018) was an East German race walker. He was born in Berlin.

== Achievements ==
Year	Competition	Venue	Position	Event	Notes
Representing East Germany
1972	Olympic Games	Munich, West Germany	11th	50 km	
1973	World Race Walking Cup	Lugano, Switzerland	2nd	20 km	
1974	European Championships	Rome, Italy	4th	20 km	
1975	World Race Walking Cup	Grand-Quevilly, France	1st	20 km	
1976	Olympic Games	Montreal, Canada	4th	20 km	
1977	World Race Walking Cup	Milton Keynes, England	3rd	20 km	
1980	Olympic Games	Moscow, Soviet Union	8th	20 km	
