= Imre Stankovics =

Hungarian racewalker

Personal information
- Nationality: Hungarian
- Born: 27 February 1950 (age 76)

Sport
- Sport: Athletics
- Event: Racewalking

Imre Stankovics (born 27 February 1950) is a Hungarian racewalker. He competed in the men's 20 kilometres walk at the 1976 Summer Olympics.
