= Roberto Buccione =

Italian racewalker

Personal information
- Nationality: Italian
- Born: 8 August 1951 (age 74) Rome, Italy
- Height: 1.78 m (5 ft 10 in)
- Weight: 70 kg (154 lb)

Sport
- Country: Italy
- Sport: Athletics
- Event: Race walk

Roberto Buccione (born 8 August 1951) is a former Italian racewalker who competed at the 1976 Summer Olympics.
