= Gerhard Weidner =

West German race walker (1933–2021)

Personal information
- Nationality: German
- Born: 15 March 1933 Magdeburg, Sachsen-Anhalt, Germany
- Died: 25 September 2021 (aged 88) Salzgitter, Niedersachsen, Germany
- Height: 170 cm (5 ft 7 in)
- Weight: 70 kg (154 lb)

Sport
- Sport: Athletics
- Event: Racewalker
- Club: TSV Salzgitter

Gerhard Weidner (15 March 1933 – 25 September 2021) was a West German race walker who represented his country three times at the Summer Olympics.

== Biography ==
Weidner was born in Magdeburg. He competed in the 50 kilometres walk in 1968 and 1972, then the 20 kilometres walk at the 1976 Summer Olympics. His best finish on the international stage was a silver medal at the 1975 IAAF World Race Walking Cup.

On 25 May 1974, he became the oldest person in the sport of athletics (post IAAF jurisdiction) to break a world record, aged 41 years, 70 days.

== International competitions ==
Representing West Germany
Year	Competition	Venue	Position	Event	Notes
1968	Olympic Games	Mexico City, Mexico	14th	50 km	
1972	Olympic Games	Munich, West Germany	6th	50 km	
1974	European Championships	Rome, Italy	7th	50 km	
1975	World Race Walking Cup	Le Grand-Quevilly, France	2nd	50 km	
1976	Olympic Games	Montreal, Canada	18th	20 km	
1976	World Championships	Malmö, Sweden	9th	50 km	
