= 1989 IAAF World Race Walking Cup =

- Organisers: IAAF
- Edition: 14th
- Date: May 27
- Host city: L'Hospitalet, Catalunya, Spain
- Events: 3
- Participation: 341 athletes from 33 nations

The 1989 IAAF World Race Walking Cup was held on 27 and 28 May 1989 in the streets of L'Hospitalet de Llobregat, suburb of Barcelona, Catalunya, Spain.

Complete results were published.

== Medallists ==
Event	Gold		Silver		Bronze	
Men
Men's 20 km walk	Frants Kostyukevich; Soviet Union	1:20:21	Mikhail Shchennikov; Soviet Union	1:20:34	Yevgeniy Misyulya; Soviet Union	1:20:47
Men's 50 km walk	Simon Baker; Australia	3:43:13	Andrey Perlov; Soviet Union	3:44:12	Stanislav Vezhel; Soviet Union	3:44:50
Lugano Cup (Men)
Team (Men)	Soviet Union	585 pts	Italy	534 pts	France	516 pts
Women
Women's 10 km walk	Beate Anders; East Germany	43:08	Kerry Saxby-Junna; Australia	43:12	Ileana Salvador; Italy	43:24
Eschborn Cup (Women)
Team (Women)	Soviet Union	218 pts	China	212 pts	Italy	203 pts

== Results ==
=== Men's 20 km ===
Place	Athlete	Nation	Time
1st place, gold medalist(s)	Frants Kostyukevich	Soviet Union (URS)	1:20:21
2nd place, silver medalist(s)	Mikhail Shchennikov	Soviet Union (URS)	1:20:34
3rd place, bronze medalist(s)	Yevgeniy Misyulya	Soviet Union (URS)	1:20:47
4	Roman Mrázek	Czechoslovakia (TCH)	1:20:56
5	Viktor Mostóvik	Soviet Union (URS)	1:21:02
6	Maurizio Damilano	Italy (ITA)	1:21:20
7	Walter Arena	Italy (ITA)	1:21:45
8	Pavol Blažek	Czechoslovakia (TCH)	1:21:53
9	Jean-Claude Corre	France (FRA)	1:22:02
10	Thierry Toutain	France (FRA)	1:22:06
11	Daniel Plaza	Spain (ESP)	1:22:09
12	José Urbano	Portugal (POR)	1:22:19
13	Ernesto Canto	Mexico (MEX)	1:22:24
14	Giovanni De Benedictis	Italy (ITA)	1:22:25
15	Chris Maddocks	Great Britain (GBR)	1:22:35
16	Sérgio Galdino	Brazil (BRA)	1:22:47
17	José Marín	Spain (ESP)	1:22:52
18	Ian McCombie	Great Britain (GBR)	1:22:58
19	Volkmar Scholz	West Germany (FRG)	1:23:15
20	Joel Sánchez	Mexico (MEX)	1:23:31
21	Jaime Barroso	Spain (ESP)	1:23:37
22	Igor Kollár	Czechoslovakia (TCH)	1:23:43
23	Miguel Angel Prieto	Spain (ESP)	1:23:50
24	Valdas Kazlauskas	Soviet Union (URS)	1:23:59
25	Guillaume LeBlanc	Canada (CAN)	1:24:19
26	Carlos Mercenario	Mexico (MEX)	1:24:30
27	Ronald Weigel	East Germany (GDR)	1:24:32
28	Chen Helin	China (CHN)	1:24:48
29	Jimmy McDonald	Ireland (IRL)	1:24:50
30	Zbigniew Sadlej	Poland (POL)	1:25:21
31	Mao Xinyuan	China (CHN)	1:25:24
32	Ján Záhončík	Czechoslovakia (TCH)	1:25:34
33	Marcelo Palma	Brazil (BRA)	1:25:39
34	Abdel Wahab Ferguène	Algeria (ALG)	1:26:04
35	Carlo Mattioli	Italy (ITA)	1:26:08
36	Zdzisław Szlapkin	Poland (POL)	1:26:13
37	Kari Ahonen	Finland (FIN)	1:26:19
38	Ignacio Zamudio	Mexico (MEX)	1:26:34
39	Sergio Spagnulo	Italy (ITA)	1:26:43
40	Robert Korzeniowski	Poland (POL)	1:26:53
41	Ricardo Pueyo	Spain (ESP)	1:26:54
42	Darrell Stone	Great Britain (GBR)	1:26:55
43	Edel Oliva	Cuba (CUB)	1:27:05
44	Andreas Hühmer	West Germany (FRG)	1:27:14
45	Tim Lewis	United States (USA)	1:27:39
46	Mark Easton	Great Britain (GBR)	1:27:50
47	Olaf Möldner	East Germany (GDR)	1:28:01
48	Mohamed Bouhalla	Algeria (ALG)	1:28:12
49	Karoly Kirszt	Hungary (HUN)	1:28:20
50	Janusz Goławski	Poland (POL)	1:28:22
51	Fabrice Delaforge	France (FRA)	1:28:34
52	Steve Partington	Great Britain (GBR)	1:28:54
53	Erling Andersen	Norway (NOR)	1:28:55
54	Torsten Hafemeister	East Germany (GDR)	1:28:59
55	Gary Morgan	United States (USA)	1:29:13
56	Carlos Ramones	Venezuela (VEN)	1:29:22
57	Pauli Pirjetä	Finland (FIN)	1:29:29
58	Daniel Vargas	Cuba (CUB)	1:29:33
59	Robert OʼLeary	Ireland (IRL)	1:29:39
60	Stefan Krausch	West Germany (FRG)	1:29:45
61	Nelson Rocha	Brazil (BRA)	1:29:48
62	Fumio Imamura	Japan (JPN)	1:29:48
63	Christophe Cousin	France (FRA)	1:29:52
64	Aldo Bertoldi	Switzerland (SUI)	1:29:59
65	Andrew Jachno	Australia (AUS)	1:30:01
66	Jan Staaf	Sweden (SWE)	1:30:19
67	Helder Oliveira	Portugal (POR)	1:30:26
68	Lennart Mether	Sweden (SWE)	1:30:39
69	Elier Garcés	Cuba (CUB)	1:30:46
70	Mark Manning	United States (USA)	1:30:46
71	Magnus Morenius	Sweden (SWE)	1:30:52
72	Sándor Kanya	Hungary (HUN)	1:31:11
73	Mohamed Hocine	Algeria (ALG)	1:31:36
74	Patrick Mokomba	Kenya (KEN)	1:31:37
75	Paulo Revez	Portugal (POR)	1:31:41
76	Michael Lane	Ireland (IRL)	1:31:50
77	Endre Andrasfai	Hungary (HUN)	1:31:51
78	Mutisya Kilonzo	Kenya (KEN)	1:31:54
79	Pat Murphy	Ireland (IRL)	1:32:02
80	Rene Haarpainter	Switzerland (SUI)	1:32:33
81	Ralf Weise	East Germany (GDR)	1:32:36
83	Benoît Gauthier	Canada (CAN)	1:33:32
84	Jean-Olivier Brosseau	France (FRA)	1:33:42
85	Paul Copeland	Australia (AUS)	1:33:43
86	Abderrahmane Djébbar	Algeria (ALG)	1:33:48
87	Pavel Szikora	Czechoslovakia (TCH)	1:33:54
88	Hans van den Knaap	Netherlands (NED)	1:33:58
89	Miklós Domján	Hungary (HUN)	1:34:17
90	Matti Heikkilä	Finland (FIN)	1:34:19
91	Augusto Cardoso	Portugal (POR)	1:34:21
92	Pascal Charrière	Switzerland (SUI)	1:34:55
93	Baldev Singh	India (IND)	1:35:39
94	Andreas Paspaliaris	Greece (GRE)	1:35:39
95	Gilbert DʼAoust	Canada (CAN)	1:35:40
96	William Sawe	Kenya (KEN)	1:36:29
97	Harold van Beek	Netherlands (NED)	1:36:45
98	Isaac Kiplimo	Kenya (KEN)	1:37:02
99	Kjell Tysse	Norway (NOR)	1:37:16
100	Kåre Sandvik	Norway (NOR)	1:37:20
101	Jos Schippers	Netherlands (NED)	1:37:27
102	Sucha Singh	India (IND)	1:37:41
103	Jan Olsson	Sweden (SWE)	1:37:56
104	Ruben López	Venezuela (VEN)	1:37:59
105	Bernard Binggeli	Switzerland (SUI)	1:38:14
106	Hirofumi Sakai	Japan (JPN)	1:38:19
107	Jorge Torrealba	Venezuela (VEN)	1:38:25
108	Marc Musiaux	Belgium (BEL)	1:38:40
109	Rob McFadden	Australia (AUS)	1:39:00
110	Philippe Burton	Belgium (BEL)	1:39:33
111	Charan Singh Rathi	India (IND)	1:40:15
112	Fabian Hume	Belgium (BEL)	1:40:19
113	Douglas Fournier	United States (USA)	1:41:09
114	César Martínez	Venezuela (VEN)	1:42:00
115	Uffe Mathiesen	Denmark (DEN)	1:42:50
116	Paul Flynn	Ireland (IRL)	1:43:23
117	Aksel Bendtsen	Denmark (DEN)	1:46:21
118	Luc Nicque	Belgium (BEL)	1:47:17
119	Mogens Corfitz	Denmark (DEN)	1:47:48
—	Torsten Zervas	West Germany (FRG)	DQ
—	Steve Pecinovsky	United States (USA)	DQ
—	Li Baoyin	China (CHN)	DNF
—	Marko Kivimäki	Finland (FIN)	DNF
—	Dimítrios Delinikópoulos	Greece (GRE)	DNF
—	Dimítrios Orfanopoulos	Greece (GRE)	DNF
—	Tomás Álvarez	Guatemala (GUA)	DNF
—	Walter Estrada	Guatemala (GUA)	DNF
—	Nelson Funes	Guatemala (GUA)	DNF
—	Takehiro Sonohara	Japan (JPN)	DNF
—	Erling Waldal	Norway (NOR)	DNF

=== Men's 50 km ===
Place	Athlete	Nation	Time
1st place, gold medalist(s)	Simon Baker	Australia (AUS)	3:43:13
2nd place, silver medalist(s)	Andrey Perlov	Soviet Union (URS)	3:44:12
3rd place, bronze medalist(s)	Stanislav Vezhel	Soviet Union (URS)	3:44:50
4	Martín Bermúdez	Mexico (MEX)	3:47:15
5	Aleksandr Potashov	Soviet Union (URS)	3:48:02
6	Vitaliy Popovich	Soviet Union (URS)	3:49:48
7	Vitaliy Matsko	Soviet Union (URS)	3:50:55
8	Alessandro Bellucci	Italy (ITA)	3:53:43
9	Martial Fesselier	France (FRA)	3:54:29
10	Godfried De Jonckheere	Belgium (BEL)	3:55:23
11	Denis Terraz	France (FRA)	3:56:06
12	René Piller	France (FRA)	3:56:06
13	Stefan Johansson	Sweden (SWE)	3:56:47
14	László Sátor	Hungary (HUN)	3:57:53
15	Li Baoyin	China (CHN)	3:58:01
16	Giuseppe de Gaetano	Italy (ITA)	3:58:22
17	Miguel Ángel Rodríguez	Mexico (MEX)	3:58:41
18	Andrés Marin	Spain (ESP)	3:59:34
19	Basilio Labrador	Spain (ESP)	3:59:51
20	Manuel Alcalde	Spain (ESP)	4:00:01
21	Jacek Bednarek	Poland (POL)	4:00:43
22	Grzegorz Ledzion	Poland (POL)	4:02:11
23	Valentin Kononen	Finland (FIN)	4:02:34
24	Massimo Quiriconi	Italy (ITA)	4:03:25
25	Les Morton	Great Britain (GBR)	4:03:30
26	Bernd Gummelt	East Germany (GDR)	4:04:03
27	Josef Hudak	Czechoslovakia (TCH)	4:04:34
28	Thierry Nuttin	France (FRA)	4:04:58
29	Jacek Herok	Poland (POL)	4:05:18
30	David Castro	Cuba (CUB)	4:06:16
31	Robert Mildenberger	West Germany (FRG)	4:06:28
32	Jaroslav Makovec	Czechoslovakia (TCH)	4:07:27
33	Adam Urbanowski	Poland (POL)	4:07:28
34	Ulf-Peter Sjöholm	Sweden (SWE)	4:08:40
35	Raffaello Ducceschi	Italy (ITA)	4:09:06
36	Peter Scholle	East Germany (GDR)	4:09:52
37	Axel Noack	East Germany (GDR)	4:10:51
38	Mike Smith	Great Britain (GBR)	4:11:04
39	Nikólaos Rasidakis	Greece (GRE)	4:11:52
40	Karl Degener	West Germany (FRG)	4:12:19
41	Herman Nelson	United States (USA)	4:12:24
42	Francisco Reyes	Mexico (MEX)	4:13:27
43	Detlef Heitmann	West Germany (FRG)	4:14:11
44	Veijo Savikko	Finland (FIN)	4:16:45
45	Hubert Sonnek	Czechoslovakia (TCH)	4:16:57
46	Zoltán Czukor	Hungary (HUN)	4:17:37
47	Paulo Vivaldes	Mexico (MEX)	4:17:56
48	Jan Cortenbach	Netherlands (NED)	4:18:57
49	Takehiro Sonohara	Japan (JPN)	4:18:59
50	Renzo Toscanelli	Switzerland (SUI)	4:19:17
51	Paul Wick	United States (USA)	4:19:42
52	Dan OʼConnor	United States (USA)	4:20:53
53	Ton van Andel	Netherlands (NED)	4:21:59
54	Mike Dewitt	United States (USA)	4:22:23
55	Hammimed Rahouli	Algeria (ALG)	4:23:46
56	Gyula Dudás	Hungary (HUN)	4:24:59
57	Andrés Arencibia	Cuba (CUB)	4:25:13
58	Antero Lindman	Finland (FIN)	4:26:41
59	Erling Andersen	Norway (NOR)	4:27:07
60	Jorge Esteves	Portugal (POR)	4:28:11
61	Darren Thorn	Great Britain (GBR)	4:28:45
62	Wolfgang Varrin	Switzerland (SUI)	4:28:56
63	Lino Paez	Venezuela (VEN)	4:29:51
64	Nelson Funes	Guatemala (GUA)	4:31:50
65	Hans van den Knaap	Netherlands (NED)	4:31:55
66	Theo Koenis	Netherlands (NED)	4:32:28
67	Michael Harvey	Australia (AUS)	4:33:07
68	Marco Antonio Rodríguez	Canada (CAN)	4:33:47
69	José Magalhães	Portugal (POR)	4:34:55
70	Chris Berwick	Great Britain (GBR)	4:35:23
71	Arezki Boumar	Algeria (ALG)	4:36:38
72	Gerard Goujon	Belgium (BEL)	4:36:59
73	Mark Donahoo	Australia (AUS)	4:37:19
74	Daniele Carrobio	Switzerland (SUI)	4:37:29
75	Mark Dossetor	Australia (AUS)	4:37:55
76	Juan Yañez	Venezuela (VEN)	4:38:30
77	Dirceu Cassimiro	Brazil (BRA)	4:39:15
78	Martin Archambault	Canada (CAN)	4:39:36
79	Tomás Álvarez	Guatemala (GUA)	4:40:41
80	Thierry Giroud	Switzerland (SUI)	4:43:28
81	Cicero de Moura	Brazil (BRA)	4:45:57
82	Kai Thomsen	Denmark (DEN)	4:46:46
83	Ricardo Risquet	Cuba (CUB)	4:47:13
84	Nourreddine Haddadou	Algeria (ALG)	4:47:13
85	Antônio Nogueira	Brazil (BRA)	4:50:00
86	Marc Dhooms	Belgium (BEL)	4:51:38
87	Juan Carlos Ribera	Venezuela (VEN)	4:53:44
88	Roger Gjelsvik	Norway (NOR)	4:54:28
89	Peer Jensen	Denmark (DEN)	4:57:24
90	Boualen Boussaid	Algeria (ALG)	4:58:24
91	Trond Møretrø	Norway (NOR)	5:03:17
92	Slobodan Radovic	Denmark (DEN)	5:04:14
93	Walter Estrada	Guatemala (GUA)	5:16:37
—	Christian Halloy	Belgium (BEL)	DQ
—	José Pinto	Portugal (POR)	DQ
—	Paulo Pires	Portugal (POR)	DQ
—	Bo Gustafsson	Sweden (SWE)	DQ
—	Craig Brill	Australia (AUS)	DNF
—	François Lapointe	Canada (CAN)	DNF
—	Daniel Levesque	Canada (CAN)	DNF
—	Chen Helin	China (CHN)	DNF
—	Mao Xinyuan	China (CHN)	DNF
—	Daniel Vargas	Cuba (CUB)	DNF
—	Mogens Corfitz	Denmark (DEN)	DNF
—	Antonio González	Spain (ESP)	DNF
—	Jorge Llopart	Spain (ESP)	DNF
—	Matti Katila	Finland (FIN)	DNF
—	Alain Lemercier	France (FRA)	DNF
—	Alfons Schwarz	West Germany (FRG)	DNF
—	Franz-Josef Weber	West Germany (FRG)	DNF
—	Hrístos Karayeóryios	Greece (GRE)	DNF
—	Spyridon Kastánis	Greece (GRE)	DNF
—	Miklós Domján	Hungary (HUN)	DNF
—	Charan Singh Rathi	India (IND)	DNF
—	Baldev Singh	India (IND)	DNF
—	Sucha Singh	IND	DNF
—	Paul Flynn	Ireland (IRL)	DNF
—	Michael Lane	Ireland (IRL)	DNF
—	Jimmy McDonald	Ireland (IRL)	DNF
—	Pat Murphy	Ireland (IRL)	DNF
—	Giovanni Perricelli	Italy (ITA)	DNF
—	Fumio Imamura	Japan (JPN)	DNF
—	Hirofumi Sakai	Japan (JPN)	DNF
—	Mutisya Kilonzo	Kenya (KEN)	DNF
—	Isaac Kiplimo	Kenya (KEN)	DNF
—	Kåre Sandvik	Norway (NOR)	DNF
—	Kjell Tysse	Norway (NOR)	DNF
—	Janusz Goławski	Poland (POL)	DNF
—	Axel Thiele	Sweden (SWE)	DNF
—	Roman Parolek	Czechoslovakia (TCH)	DNF
—	Eugene Kitts	United States (USA)	DNF
—	Henry Goitia	Venezuela (VEN)	DNF

=== Team (men) ===
The team rankings, named Lugano Trophy, combined the 20 km and 50 km events team results.

Place	Country	Points
1st place, gold medalist(s)	Soviet Union	585 pts
2nd place, silver medalist(s)	Italy	534 pts
3rd place, bronze medalist(s)	France	516 pts
4	Spain	503 pts
5	Mexico	490 pts
6	Czechoslovakia	474 pts
7	Poland	444 pts
8	United Kingdom	425 pts
9	East Germany	408 pts
10	West Germany	396 pts
11	Finland	340 pts
12	United States	334 pts
13	Hungary	333 pts
14	Cuba	312 pts
15	Brazil	295 pts
16	Sweden	290 pts
17	Algeria	287 pts
18	Australia	269 pts
19	Portugal	257 pts
20	Switzerland	245 pts
21	China	234 pts
22	Netherlands	226 pts
23	Canada	207 pts
24	Denmark	198 pts
25	Belgium	193 pts
26	Norway	193 pts
27	Venezuela	191 pts
28	Ireland	162 pts
29	Japan	123 pts
30	Kenya	96 pts
31	Guatemala	93 pts
32	Greece	92 pts
33	India	58 pts

=== Women's 10 km ===
Place	Athlete	Nation	Time
1st place, gold medalist(s)	Beate Anders	East Germany (GDR)	43:08
2nd place, silver medalist(s)	Kerry Saxby-Junna	Australia (AUS)	43:12
3rd place, bronze medalist(s)	Ileana Salvador	Italy (ITA)	43:24
4	Natalya Serbiyenko	Soviet Union (URS)	43:46
5	Chen Yueling	China (CHN)	44:24
6	Tamara Kovalenko	Soviet Union (URS)	44:28
7	Xiong Yan	China (CHN)	44:29
8	Annarita Sidoti	Italy (ITA)	44:59
9	Tamara Torshina	Soviet Union (URS)	45:00
10	Mária Urbanik	Hungary (HUN)	45:20
11	Janice McCaffrey	Canada (CAN)	45:37
12	Valentina Shmer	Soviet Union (URS)	45:59
13	Monica Gunnarsson	Sweden (SWE)	45:59
14	Li Chunxiu	China (CHN)	46:00
15	Lisa Langford	Great Britain (GBR)	46:02
16	Mari Cruz Díaz	Spain (ESP)	46:12
17	Ann Peel	Canada (CAN)	46:24
18	Olga Sánchez	Spain (ESP)	46:27
19	Maria Colin	Mexico (MEX)	46:32
20	Yan Hong	China (CHN)	46:33
21	Lynn Weik	United States (USA)	46:38
22	Andrea Alföldi	Hungary (HUN)	46:43
23	Teresa Vaill	United States (USA)	46:45
24	Ildikó Ilyés	Hungary (HUN)	46:46
25	Maria Grazia Orsani	Italy (ITA)	46:59
26	Kathrin Born	East Germany (GDR)	47:00
27	Pascale Grand	Canada (CAN)	47:02
28	Yu Heping	China (CHN)	47:04
29	Fusako Masuda	Japan (JPN)	47:12
30	Anikó Szebenszky	Hungary (HUN)	47:14
31	Lorraine Young-Jachno	Australia (AUS)	47:18
32	Simone Thust	East Germany (GDR)	47:22
33	Antonella Marangoni	Italy (ITA)	47:23
34	Andrea Brückmann	West Germany (FRG)	47:30
35	Hideko Hirayama	Japan (JPN)	47:33
36	Eva Cruz	Spain (ESP)	47:41
37	Sari Essayah	Finland (FIN)	47:54
38	Nathalie Marchand-Fortain	France (FRA)	47:58
39	Anita Blomberg	Norway (NOR)	47:59
40	María Reyes Sobrino	Spain (ESP)	48:07
41	Debbi Lawrence	United States (USA)	48:10
42	Kalliopi Gavalaki	Greece (GRE)	48:15
43	Ann Jansson	Sweden (SWE)	48:15
44	Wendy Sharp	United States (USA)	48:18
45	Kazimiera Mróz-Mosio	Poland (POL)	48:19
46	Ines Estedt	East Germany (GDR)	48:31
47	Jolanta Frysztak	Poland (POL)	48:32
48	Yuko Sato	Japan (JPN)	48:43
49	Betty Sworowski	Great Britain (GBR)	48:50
50	Alison Baker	Canada (CAN)	48:53
51	Helen Elleker	Great Britain (GBR)	48:56
52	Kristin Andreassen	Norway (NOR)	48:57
53	Barbara Kollorz	West Germany (FRG)	49:11
54	Teresa Palacios	Spain (ESP)	49:15
55	Beverley Hayman	Australia (AUS)	49:31
56	Suzanne Griesbach	France (FRA)	49:40
57	Holly Gerke	Canada (CAN)	49:49
58	Brigitte Buck	West Germany (FRG)	49:57
59	Ewa Musur	Poland (POL)	50:06
60	Anne-Catherine Berthonnaud	France (FRA)	50:15
61	Renate Warz	West Germany (FRG)	50:17
62	Gunhild Kristiansen	Denmark (DEN)	50:45
63	Julie Drake	Great Britain (GBR)	50:57
64	Laurence Vion	France (FRA)	51:05
65	Madelein Svensson	Sweden (SWE)	51:06
66	Nicky Jackson	Great Britain (GBR)	51:07
67	Heli Nevanpää	Finland (FIN)	51:10
68	Karin Jensen	Denmark (DEN)	51:13
69	Nina Johannessen	Norway (NOR)	51:19
70	Nadine Mazuir-Vavre	France (FRA)	51:36
71	Ivana Henn	Brazil (BRA)	51:51
72	Heidi Rebellato	Switzerland (SUI)	51:59
73	Wibecke Rathe-Larsen	Norway (NOR)	52:02
74	Muriel Eberhard	West Germany (FRG)	52:05
75	Marie Walsh	Ireland (IRL)	52:13
76	Angelikí Sórra	Greece (GRE)	52:27
77	Veronica Öqvist	Sweden (SWE)	52:27
79	Maryanne Torrellas	United States (USA)	53:07
80	Mirva Hämäläinen	Finland (FIN)	53:27
81	Anja Kondrup	Denmark (DEN)	53:32
82	Anneli Kuukkanen	Finland (FIN)	53:59
83	Frieda Dewolf	Belgium (BEL)	54:00
84	Rosemar Piazza	Brazil (BRA)	54:16
85	Christa Ceulemans	Belgium (BEL)	54:45
86	Denise Volker	Brazil (BRA)	54:52
87	Josephine Quinlan	Ireland (IRL)	55:06
88	Ragni Jensen	Norway (NOR)	55:14
89	Véronique Gérard	Belgium (BEL)	55:35
90	Maritza Aragon	Venezuela (VEN)	55:45
91	Edith Sappl	Switzerland (SUI)	56:07
92	Trudy Freany	Ireland (IRL)	56:27
93	Karen Klarskov	Denmark (DEN)	57:02
94	Francis Botello	Venezuela (VEN)	57:02
95	Sabine Deblanck	Belgium (BEL)	57:45
96	Sylvie Zaugg	Switzerland (SUI)	58:47
97	Carolina Rosales	Venezuela (VEN)	61:21
98	Everline Chepngetich	Kenya (KEN)	63:46
99	Jane Tangus	Kenya (KEN)	64:06
—	Erica Alfridi	Italy (ITA)	DQ
—	Valeria Ndaliro	Kenya (KEN)	DQ
—	Maricela Chávez	Mexico (MEX)	DQ
—	Graciela Mendoza	Mexico (MEX)	DQ
—	Dímitra Panoutsopoúlou	Greece (GRE)	DNF
—	Laurence Perrin	Switzerland (SUI)	DNF
—	Nadezhda Ryashkina	Soviet Union (URS)	DNF

=== Team (women) ===
Place	Country	Points
1st place, gold medalist(s)	Soviet Union	218 pts
2nd place, silver medalist(s)	China	212 pts
3rd place, bronze medalist(s)	Italy	203 pts
4	East Germany	185 pts
5	Hungary	185 pts
6	Canada	185 pts
7	Spain	174 pts
8	Australia	163 pts
9	United States	162 pts
10	Japan	141 pts
11	United Kingdom	140 pts
12	Sweden	137 pts
13	West Germany	117 pts
14	Poland	112 pts
15	France	109 pts
16	Norway	106 pts
17	Finland	93 pts
18	Denmark	73 pts
19	Greece	64 pts
20	Mexico	61 pts
21	Ireland	55 pts
22	Brazil	54 pts
23	Belgium	44 pts
24	Switzerland	41 pts
25	Venezuela	27 pts
26	Kenya	11 pts

== Participation ==
The participation of 341 athletes (235 men/106 women) from 33 countries is reported.

- Algeria (8/-)
- Australia (8/3)
- Belgium (8/4)
- Brazil (6/3)
- Canada (7/5)
- China (3/5)
- Cuba (6/-)
- Czechoslovakia (9/-)
- Denmark (6/4)
- East Germany (7/4)
- Finland (8/4)
- France (10/5)
- Greece (6/3)
- Guatemala (3/-)
- Hungary (7/4)
- India (3/-)
- Ireland (5/4)
- Italy (10/5)
- Japan (3/3)
- Kenya (4/3)
- Mexico (8/3)
- Netherlands (6/-)
- Norway (6/5)
- Poland (8/3)
- Portugal (8/-)
- Soviet Union (10/5)
- Spain (10/5)
- Sweden (8/4)
- Switzerland (8/4)
- United Kingdom (9/5)
- United States (10/5)
- Venezuela (8/3)
- West Germany (8/5)

== See also ==
- 1989 Race Walking Year Ranking
