= 1988 in race walking =

This page lists the World Best Year Performance in the year 1988 in both the men's and the women's race walking distances: 10 km, 20 km and 50 km (outdoor). The main event during this season were the Olympic Games in Seoul, South Korea.

== Abbreviations ==
- All times shown are in hours:minutes:seconds

WR	world record
AR	area record
CR	event record
NR	national record
PB	personal best

== Men's 20 km ==
=== Records ===
Standing records prior to the 1988 season in track and field
World Record	Axel Noack (GDR)	1:19:12	June 21, 1987	Karl-Marx-Stadt, East Germany
Broken records during the 1988 season in track and field
World Record	Mikhail Shchennikov (URS)	1:19:08	July 30, 1988	Kiev, Soviet Union

=== 1988 World Year Ranking ===
Rank	Time	Athlete	Venue	Date	Note
1	1:19:08	Mikhail Shchennikov (URS)	Kiev, Soviet Union	30 July 1988	WR
2	1:19:16	Yevgeniy Misyulya (URS)			
3	1:19:39	Frants Kostyukevich (URS)			
4	1:19:47	Viktor Mostovik (URS)			
5	1:19:57	Jozef Pribilinec (TCH)	Seoul, South Korea	23 September 1988	
6	1:20:00	Ronald Weigel (GDR)	Seoul, South Korea	23 September 1988	
7	1:20:06	Sergey Protsyshin (URS)			
8	1:20:08	Valdas Kazlauskas (URS)			
9	1:20:10	Igor Lyubomirov (URS)			
10	1:20:14	Grigoriy Kornev (URS)			
10	1:20:14	Maurizio Damilano (ITA)	Seoul, South Korea	23 September 1988	
12	1:20:17	Pavol Blažek (TCH)			
13	1:20:19	Vyacheslav Smirnov (URS)			
14	1:20:34	José Marín (ESP)	Seoul, South Korea	23 September 1988	
15	1:20:39	Axel Noack (GDR)			
16	1:20:40	Aleksandr Pershin (URS)			
16	1:20:40	Ralf Kowalsky (GDR)			
18	1:20:43	Anatoliy Solomin (URS)			
18	1:20:43	Lyubomir Ivanov (BUL)	Sofia, Bulgaria	26 June 1988	NR
18	1:20:43	Roman Mrázek (TCH)	Seoul, South Korea	23 September 1988	

== Men's 50 km ==
=== Records ===
Standing records prior to the 1988 season in track and field
World Record	Ronald Weigel (GDR)	3:38:17	May 25, 1986	Potsdam, East Germany

=== 1988 World Year Ranking ===
Rank	Time	Athlete	Venue	Date	Note
1	3:38:29	Vyacheslav Ivanenko (URS)	Seoul, South Korea	30 September 1988	
2	3:38:56	Ronald Weigel (GDR)	Seoul, South Korea	30 September 1988	
3	3:39:45	Hartwig Gauder (GDR)	Seoul, South Korea	30 September 1988	
4	3:41:00	Aleksandr Potashov (URS)	Seoul, South Korea	30 September 1988	
5	3:43:03	José Marín (ESP)	Seoul, South Korea	30 September 1988	
6	3:44:07	Simon Baker (AUS)	Seoul, South Korea	30 September 1988	AR
7	3:44:27	Raffaello Ducceschi (ITA)			NR
8	3:44:49	Bo Gustafsson (SWE)	Seoul, South Korea	30 September 1988	NR
9	3:44:57	Reima Salonen (FIN)			
10	3:46:30	Vitaliy Popovich (URS)			
11	3:46:31	Dietmar Meisch (GDR)	Seoul, South Korea	30 September 1988	
12	3:46:52	Pavol Szikora (TCH)			
13	3:47:14	Giovanni Perricelli (ITA)	Seoul, South Korea	30 September 1988	
14	3:47:30	Bernd Gummelt (GDR)			
15	3:47:31	Pavol Blažek (TCH)	Seoul, South Korea	30 September 1988	
16	3:48:08	Sandro Bellucci (ITA)			
17	3:48:09	Jorge Llopart (ESP)	Seoul, South Korea	30 September 1988	
18	3:48:15	François Lapointe (CAN)	Seoul, South Korea	30 September 1988	
19	3:48:39	Nikolay Frolov (URS)			
20	3:48:53	Valeriy Suntsov (URS)			

== Women's 5 km ==
=== Records ===
Standing records prior to the 1988 season in track and field
World Record	Kerry Saxby (AUS)	20:34	September 24, 1987	Hildesheim, West Germany

=== 1988 World Year Ranking ===
Rank	Time	Athlete	Venue	Date	Note
1	20:52	Kerry Saxby-Junna (AUS)	Adelaide, Australia	16 October 1988	
2	21:10	Vera Ossipova (URS)			AR
3	21:21	Natalya Spiridonova (URS)			
4	21:53	Sada Eidikyte (URS)			
5	21:54	Svetlana Kaburkina (URS)			
6	21:56	Alina Ivanova (URS)			
7	22:02	Sari Essayah (FIN)			
8	22:03	Mirva Hämäläinen (FIN)			
9	22:05	Tatyana Titova (URS)			
9	22:05	Yevgeniya Micheyeva (URS)			
11	22:11	Mari Cruz Díaz (ESP)			
12	22:13	Olga Kardopolzeva (URS)			
13	22:14	Yelena Rodionova (URS)			
14	22:15	Maria Reyes Sobrino (ESP)			
15	22:18	Valentina Zybulskaya (URS)			
16	22:20	Maria Popkova (URS)			
17	22:21	Leonarda Yuchnevich (URS)			
18	22:24	Raissa Sinyavina (URS)			
19	22:30	Regina Loseva (URS)			
20	22:32	Teresa Vaill (USA)			
20	22:32	Sarah Standley (USA)			

== Women's 10 km ==
=== Records ===
Standing records prior to the 1988 season in track and field
World Record	Kerry Saxby (AUS)	42:52	May 4, 1987	Melbourne, Australia
Broken records during the 1988 season in track and field
World Record	Kerry Saxby-Junna (AUS)	41:30	August 27, 1988	Canberra, Australia

=== 1988 World Year Ranking ===
Rank	Time	Athlete	Venue	Date	Note
1	41:30	Kerry Saxby-Junna (AUS)	Canberra, Australia	27 August 1988	WR
2	43:26	Svetlana Kaburkina (URS)			
3	43:29	Vera Makolova (URS)			
4	43:37	Yelena Nikolayeva (URS)			
5	43:43	Tamara Kovalenko (URS)			
6	43:53	Natalya Spiridonova (URS)			
7	44:13	Nadeshda Ryashkina (URS)			
8	44:16	Natalya Serbinenko (URS)			
9	44:20	Sada Eidikyte (URS)			
10	44:21	Olga Veremenchuk (URS)			
11	44:26	Sari Essayah (FIN)			NR
12	44:33	Beate Anders (GDR)			NR
13	44:54	Mirva Hämäläinen (FIN)			
14	44:57	Ludmila Lyubomirova (URS)			
15	44:58	Svetlana Polovinko (URS)			
16	44:59	Victoria Oprea (ROM)			NR
17	45:00	Yelena Rodionova (URS)			
18	45:01	Valentina Shmer (URS)			
19	45:12	Vera Ossipova (URS)			
20	45:17	Natalya Storochenko (URS)			
