= Athletics at the 1985 Summer Universiade – Men's 20 kilometres walk =

The men's 20 kilometres walk event at the 1985 Summer Universiade was held at the Kobe Universiade Memorial Stadium in Kobe on 1 September.

== Results ==
Rank	Athlete	Nationality	Time	Notes
1st place, gold medalist(s)	Viktor Mostovik	Soviet Union	1:25:52	
2nd place, silver medalist(s)	Andrey Perlov	Soviet Union	1:25:52	
3rd place, bronze medalist(s)	Guillaume LeBlanc	Canada	1:26:22	
4	Maurizio Damilano	Italy	1:27:36	
5	Venyamin Nikolayev	Soviet Union	1:29:04	
6	Sergey Protishin	Soviet Union	1:29:04	
7	Tim Lewis	United States	1:29:21	
8	Alessandro Pezzatini	Italy	1:30:10	
9	Simon Baker	Australia	1:30:50	
10	Biliulfo Andablo	Mexico	1:31:17	
11	Sebastiano Premio	Mexico	1:31:23	
12	Giorgio Damilano	Italy	1:31:50	
13	Philip Vesty	Great Britain	1:33:07	
14	François Lapointe	Canada	1:34:59	
15	Andrew Jachno	Australia	1:36:21	
16	Marco Evoniuk	United States	1:36:10	
17	Yushihiro Oie	Japan	1:37:43	
18	Osvaldo Morejon	Bolivia	1:39:33	
19	Luis Maroto	Spain	1:39:43	
20	Takehiro Sonohara	Japan	1:41:31	
21	Abdelwahab Ferguène	Algeria	1:41:44	
22	Nelson Funes	Guatemala	1:44:50	
	Ranjit Singh	India	DQ	
	Zhang Yanlong	China	DNF	
	Wolfgang Wiedemann	West Germany	DNF	
	L. Kibisu	Kenya	DNF	
