= Athletics at the 1992 Summer Olympics – Men's 50 kilometres walk =

Men's 50 kilometres walk at the Games of the XXV Olympiad
- Venue: Olympic Stadium
- Dates: August 7
- Competitors: 45 from 21 nations
- Winning time: 3:50:13

Medalists
1st place, gold medalist(s)		Andrey Perlov; Unified Team
2nd place, silver medalist(s)		Carlos Mercenario; Mexico
3rd place, bronze medalist(s)		Ronald Weigel; Germany

These are the official results of the Men's 50 km Walk at the 1992 Summer Olympics in Barcelona, Spain. There were a total number of 45 competitors, with seven athletes who were disqualified.

== Medalists ==
Gold	Andrey Perlov; Unified Team
Silver	Carlos Mercenario; Mexico
Bronze	Ronald Weigel; Germany

== Abbreviations ==
- All times shown are in hours:minutes:seconds

DNS	did not start
NM	no mark
OR	olympic record
WR	world record
AR	area record
NR	national record
PB	personal best
SB	season best

== Records ==
Standing records prior to the 1992 Summer Olympics
World Record	Andrey Perlov (URS)	3:37.41	August 5, 1989	Leningrad, Soviet Union
Olympic Record	Vyacheslav Ivanenko (URS)	3:38.29	September 30, 1988	Seoul, South Korea

== Final classification ==
- Held on August 7, 1992

RANK	FINAL	TIME
	Andrey Perlov (EUN)	3:50:13
	Carlos Mercenario (MEX)	3:52:09
	Ronald Weigel (GER)	3:53:45
4.	Valeriy Spitsyn (EUN)	3:54:39
5.	Roman Mrázek (TCH)	3:55:21
6.	Hartwig Gauder (GER)	3:56:47
7.	Valentin Kononen (FIN)	3:57:21
8.	Miguel Rodríguez (MEX)	3:58:26
9.	Josep Marín (ESP)	3:58:41
10.	Jesús Ángel García (ESP)	3:58:43
11.	Stefan Johansson (SWE)	3:58:56
12.	Giuseppe De Gaetano (ITA)	3:59:13
13.	Massimo Quiriconi (ITA)	4:00:28
14.	Jaime Barroso (ESP)	4:02:08
15.	René Piller (FRA)	4:02:40
16.	Alain Lemercier (FRA)	4:06:31
17.	Martial Fesselier (FRA)	4:07:30
18.	Fumio Imamura (JPN)	4:07:45
19.	Simon Baker (AUS)	4:08:11
20.	Pascal Charrière (SUI)	4:08:32
21.	Les Morton (GBR)	4:09:34
22.	Takehiro Sonohara (JPN)	4:13:22
23.	Carl Schueler (USA)	4:13:38
24.	Tadahiro Kosaka (JPN)	4:14:24
25.	José Urbano (POR)	4:16:31
26.	Stefan Wögerbauer (AUT)	4:17:25
27.	Pavol Szikora (TCH)	4:17:49
28.	José Magalhães (POR)	4:20:12
29.	Pavol Blažek (TCH)	4:22:33
30.	Paul Blagg (GBR)	4:23:10
31.	Harold van Beek (NED)	4:24:18
32.	Herm Nelson (USA)	4:25:49
—	Giovanni Perricelli (ITA)	DNF
—	Aldo Bertoldi (SUI)	DNF
—	Marco Evoniuk (USA)	DNF
—	Robert Korzeniowski (POL)	DSQ
—	Guillaume LeBlanc (CAN)	DSQ
—	Germán Sánchez (MEX)	DSQ
—	Aleksandr Potashov (EUN)	DSQ
—	Tim Berrett (CAN)	DSQ
—	Godfried De Jonckheere (BEL)	DSQ
—	José Pinto (POR)	DSQ
—	Li Mingcai (CHN)	DNS

== See also ==
- 1990 Men's European Championships 50 km Walk (Split)
- 1991 Men's World Championship 50 km Walk (Tokyo)
- 1992 Race Walking Year Ranking
- 1993 Men's World Championships 50 km Walk (Stuttgart)
