= 1989 in race walking =

This page lists the World Best Year Performance in the year 1989 in both the men's and the women's race walking distances: 10 km, 20 km and 50 km (outdoor).

== Abbreviations ==
- All times shown are in hours:minutes:seconds

WR	world record
AR	area record
CR	event record
NR	national record
PB	personal best

== Men's 20 km ==
=== Records ===
Standing records prior to the 1989 season in track and field
World Record	Mikhail Shchennikov (URS)	1:19:08	July 30, 1988	Kiev, Soviet Union
Broken records during the 1989 season in track and field
World Record	Yevgeniy Misyulya (URS)	1:18:54	February 19, 1989	Sochi, Soviet Union

=== 1989 World Year Ranking ===
Rank	Time	Athlete	Venue	Date	Note
1	1:18:54	Yevgeniy Misyulya (URS)	Sochi, Soviet Union	19/02/1989	WR
2	1:19:29	Valdas Kazlauskas (URS)			
3	1:20:08	Vladimir Andreyev (URS)			
4	1:20:11	Grigoriy Kornev (URS)			
5	1:20:16	Ernesto Canto (MEX)			
6	1:20:21	Frants Kostyukevich (URS)			
7	1:20:22	Yevgeniy Zaykin (URS)			
8	1:20:28	Vyacheslav Cherepanov (URS)			
9	1:20:34	Mikhail Shchennikov (URS)			
10	1:20:56	Roman Mrázek (TCH)			
11	1:21:02	Viktor Mostovik (URS)			
12	1:21:20	Maurizio Damilano (ITA)			
13	1:21:27	Vladimir Druchik (URS)			
14	1:21:29	Andrey Perlov (URS)			
15	1:21:34	Oleg Troshin (URS)			
16	1:21:36	Ronald Weigel (GDR)			
17	1:21:37	Igor Plotnikov (URS)			
18	1:21:42	Oleg Plastun (URS)			
19	1:21:45	Walter Arena (ITA)			
20	1:21:49	Sergey Prochishin (URS)			

== Men's 50 km ==
=== Records ===
Standing records prior to the 1989 season in track and field
World Record	Ronald Weigel (GDR)	3:38:17	May 25, 1986	Potsdam, East Germany
Broken records during the 1989 season in track and field
World Record	Andrey Perlov (URS)	3:37:41	August 5, 1989	Leningrad, Soviet Union

=== 1989 World Year Ranking ===
Rank	Time	Athlete	Venue	Date	Note
1	3:37:41	Andrey Perlov (URS)	Leningrad, Soviet Union	05/08/1989	WR
2	3:43:13	Simon Baker (AUS)	L'Hospitalet de Llobregat, Spain	28/05/1989	AR
3	3:43:57	Vitaliy Matsko (URS)			
4	3:43:57	Vitaliy Popovich (URS)			NR
5	3:44:12	Anatoliy Grigoryev (URS)			
6	3:44:50	Stanislav Vechel (URS)			
7	3:46:08	Vyacheslav Smirnov (URS)			
8	3:46:14	Andrey Plotnikov (URS)			
9	3:46:37	Martín Bermúdez (MEX)			
10	3:47:34	Godfried De Jonckheere (BEL)	Arras, France	10/09/1989	NR
11	3:48:02	Aleksandr Potashov (URS)			
12	3:48:38	Valeriy Spitsyn (URS)			
13	3:49:33	Valeriy Suntsov (URS)			
14	3:50:25	German Skurygin (URS)			
15	3:50:28	René Piller (FRA)			
16	3:50:30	Sergey Titov (URS)			
17	3:51:17	Bo Gustafsson (SWE)			
18	3:51:46	Artur Shumak (URS)			
19	3:52:06	Alain Lemercier (FRA)			
20	3:52:14	Aleksey Volgin (URS)			

== Women's 10 km ==
=== Records ===
Standing records prior to the 1989 season in track and field
World Record	Kerry Saxby-Junna (AUS)	41:30	August 27, 1988	Canberra, Australia

=== 1989 World Year Ranking ===
Rank	Time	Athlete	Venue	Date	Note
1	42:16	Alina Ivanova (URS)			AR
2	42:47	Kerry Saxby-Junna (AUS)			
3	43:04	Vera Makolova (URS)			
4	43:08	Beate Anders (GDR)			NR
5	43:14	Tamara Kovalenko (URS)			
6	43:24	Ileana Salvador (ITA)			NR
7	43:27	Graciela Mendoza (MEX)			AR
8	43:38	Nadashda Ryashkina (URS)			
9	43:43	Irina Strachova (URS)			
10	43:45	Olga Kardopoltseva (URS)			
11	43:46	Natalya Serbinenko (URS)			
12	44:06	Olga Krishtop (URS)			
13	44:12	Natalya Spiridonova (URS)			
14	44:23	Valentina Shmer (URS)			
15	44:24	Chen Yueling (CHN)			
16	44:26	Tamara Torshina (URS)			
17	44:29	Yan Xiong (CHN)			
18	44:34	Erica Alfridi (ITA)			
19	44:36	Leonarda Yuchnevich (URS)			
19	44:39	Tamara Sirovzeva (URS)			
21	44:39	Yelena Panfilova (URS)			

== See also ==
- 1989 IAAF World Race Walking Cup
