= Athletics at the 1983 Summer Universiade – Men's 20 kilometres walk =

The men's 20 kilometres walk event at the 1983 Summer Universiade was held in Edmonton, Canada on 8 July 1983.

== Results ==
| Rank | Athlete | Nationality | Time | Notes |
|---|---|---|---|---|
| 1st place, gold medalist(s) | Guillaume LeBlanc | Canada | 1:24:03 | |
| 2nd place, silver medalist(s) | Maurizio Damilano | Italy | 1:24:21 | |
| 3rd place, bronze medalist(s) | Nikolay Matveyev | Soviet Union | 1:25:07 | |
| 4 | Vyacheslav Smirnov | Soviet Union | 1:25:40 | |
| 5 | Alessandro Pezzatini | Italy | 1:26:15 | |
| 6 | Sandro Bellucci | Italy | 1:26:36 | |
| 7 | François Lapointe | Canada | 1:26:44 | |
| 8 | Qiu Shiyong | China | 1:27:02 | |
| 9 | Marco Evoniuk | United States | 1:27:22 | |
| 10 | Giorgio Damilano | Italy | 1:27:48 | |
| 11 | Philip Vesty | Great Britain | 1:29:08 | |
| 12 | Pierluigi Fiorella | Italy | 1:30:22 | |
| 13 | Fritz Helms | West Germany | 1:33:45 | |
| 14 | Zang Yanlong | China | 1:34:18 | |
| 15 | Rafael Maroto | Spain | 1:34:57 | |
| 16 | Tim Lewis | United States | 1:35:36 | |
| 17 | Takehiro Sonohara | Japan | 1:35:49 | |
| 18 | Murray Day | New Zealand | 1:35:52 | |
| 19 | Tadahiro Kosaka | Japan | 1:38:06 | |
| | Sebastián Premio | Mexico | DQ | |
| | Aloizas Bludzus | Soviet Union | DQ | |
