= Stanislav Vezhel =

Belarusian former racewalker (born 1958)

Medal record

Men's athletics

Representing the Soviet Union

IAAF World Race Walking Cup
Bronze medal – third place	1989 Barcelona	50 km walk

Stanislav Vezhel (Russian: Вежель Станислав Станиславович; born 11 October 1958 in village Lunna, Grodno region) is a Belarusian former racewalker who competed in the 50 kilometres race walk for the Soviet Union.

His greatest achievement was a bronze medal in the 50 km walk at the 1989 IAAF World Race Walking Cup, where he finished behind Australia's Simon Baker and Soviet compatriot Andrey Perlov. He made one further high profile international appearance, competing for Belarus at the 1993 IAAF World Race Walking Cup, though he was disqualified for lifting.

He ranked second among Soviet athletes in 1989 (behind then world record holder Perlov) and was down to fourth in the national rankings the following year with the rise of Andrey Plotnikov and Aleksandr Potashov. Among international standard races that year, he was third in the world with what would turn out to be his lifetime best of 3:42:00 hours for the distance. This mark was achieved in Moscow on 27 May 1990 and placed him as the tenth best walker ever at that point in time.

== International competitions ==
Year	Competition	Venue	Position	Event	Notes
1989	IAAF World Race Walking Cup	Barcelona, Spain	3rd	50 km walk	3:44:50
1993	IAAF World Race Walking Cup	Monterrey, Mexico	—	50 km walk	DQ
