= 1988 USA Outdoor Track and Field Championships =

- Dates: June 16–19
- Host city: Tampa, Florida, United States
- Venue: Pepin-Rood Stadium

The 1988 USA Outdoor Track and Field Championships took place between June 16–19 at Pepin-Rood Stadium on the campus of University of Tampa in Tampa, Florida. The meet was organized by The Athletics Congress. This was the last time the National Championships were held separately from the Olympic Trials in the same year. With the Trials held four weeks later, many athletes made decisions to forgo the National Championships in order to be ready for the trials. Starting in 1992, the two meets were combined.

== Results ==
=== Men track events ===
Event	Gold		Silver		Bronze	
100 meters (+0.5 m/s)	Emmit King	10.04	Brian Cooper	10.07	Lee McNeill	10.09
200 meters (-1.2 m/s)	Larry Myricks	20.50	Eugene McNeill	20.66	Daron Council	20.67
400 meters	Tim Simon	44.92	Clarence Daniel	45.20	Walter McCoy	45.33
800 meters	Mark Everett	1:45.1	Ocky Clark	1:45.6	Charlton Hamer	1:45.8
1500 meters	Mark Deady	3:39.4	Maurice Smith	3:39.5	Richie Martinez	3:39.8
5000 meters	Doug Padilla	13:42.7	Keith Brantly	13:45.2	John Gregorek	13:45.8
10,000 meters	Steve Taylor	30:08.6	Gerard Donakowski	30:10.4	John Erickson	30:29.9
110 meters hurdles (+1.3 m/s)	Roger Kingdom	13.22	Tonie Campbell	13.38	Arthur Blake	13.41
400 meters hurdles	Kevin Henderson	48.68	Theron Brown	49.32	George Porter	49.49
3000 meters steeplechase	Brian Diemer	8:25.7	Ivan Huff	8:27.6	Jim Cooper	8:28.6
20 kilometres race walk	Tim Lewis	1:29:34	Ray Sharp	1:32:14	Andy Kaestner	1:32:40

=== Men field events ===
Event	Gold		Silver		Bronze	
High jump	Doug Nordquist	2.34 m (7 ft 8 in) MR	Jim Howard	2.30 m (7 ft 6 1/2 in)	Hollis Conway	2.30 m (7 ft 6 1/2 in)
Pole vault	Kory Tarpenning	5.65 m (18 ft 6 1/4 in)	Todd Cooper	5.50 m (18 ft 1/2 in)	Pat Manson	5.50 m (18 ft 1/2 in)
Long jump	Eric Metcalf	8.44 m (27 ft 8 1/4 in)	Mike Conley	8.17 m (26 ft 9 1/2 in)	Tyrus Jefferson	8.15 m (26 ft 8 3/4 in)w
Triple jump	Mike Conley	17.35 m (56 ft 11 in)	Willie Banks	17.16 m (56 ft 3 1/2 in)	John Tillman	16.92 m (55 ft 6 in)
Shot put	Ed Wade	19.41 m (63 ft 8 in)	Brian Oldfield	19.15 m (62 ft 9 3/4 in)	Marty Kobza	19.12 m (62 ft 8 3/4 in)
Discus throw	Mac Wilkins	65.28 m (214 ft 2 in)	John Powell	64.00 m (209 ft 11 in)	Mike Buncic	63.24 m (207 ft 5 in)
Hammer throw	Ken Flax	78.10 m (256 ft 2 in)	Jud Logan	77.16 m (253 ft 1 in)	Lance Deal	72.70 m (238 ft 6 in)
Javelin throw	Dave Stephens	79.70 m (261 ft 5 in)	Mike Barnett	78.94 m (258 ft 11 in)	Brian Crouser	78.82 m (258 ft 7 in)
Decathlon	Gary Kinder	8293	Tim Bright	8287	Dave Johnson	8245

=== Women track events ===
Event	Gold		Silver		Bronze	
100 meters (+0.6 m/s)	Sheila Echols	11.24	Esther Jones	11.32	Michelle Finn	11.34
200 meters (-0.1 m/s)	Gwen Torrence	22.71	Diane Dixon	22.84	Rochelle Stevens	23.13
400 meters	Lillie Leatherwood	51.01	Maicel Malone	51.35	Jearl Miles	51.45
800 meters	Joetta Clark	1:59.8	Julie Jenkins	2:00.7	Debbie Grant	2:00.8
1500 meters	Vicki Huber	4:07.4	Sabrina Dornhoefer	4:09.1	Alisa Harvey	4:10.5
3000 meters	Lynn Jennings	8:55.4	Joan Nesbit	9:05.7	Trina Painter	9:09.0
5000 meters	Brenda Webb	15:18.7	Betty Jo Geiger	15:46.5	Annie Schweitzer	15:57.9
10,000 meters	Carol McLatchie	34:25.3	Judy Bogenschutz	34:44.4	Wiley Fulham	35:40.8
100 meters hurdles (+0.5 m/s)	Kim McKenzie	12.84	Benita Fitzgerald-Brown	12.85	Linda Tolbert	13.12
400 meters hurdles	Schowonda Williams	55.24	Leslie Maxie	55.33	Victoria Fulcher	55.88
10 kilometres race walk	Maryanne Torrellas	48:25.3	Teresa Vaill	48:32.5	Wendy Sharp	50:50.3

=== Women field events ===
Event	Gold		Silver		Bronze	
High jump	Jan Wohlschlag	1.97 m (6 ft 5 1/2 in)	Coleen Sommer	1.92 m (6 ft 3 1/2 in)	Amber Welty	1.89 m (6 ft 2 1/4 in)
Long jump	Sheila Echols	6.44 m (21 ft 1 1/2 in)	Claire Connor	6.41 m (21 ft 1/4 in)	Wendy Brown	6.40 m (20 ft 11 3/4 in)
Triple jump	Wendy Brown	13.82 m (45 ft 4 in)	Nena Gage	12.98 m (42 ft 7 in)	Angela Goodman	12.94 m (42 ft 5 1/4 in)
Shot put	Connie Price-Smith	19.15 m (62 ft 9 3/4 in)	Pam Dukes	17.70 m (58 ft 3/4 in)	Peggy Pollock	17.31 m (56 ft 9 1/4 in)
Discus throw	Lacy Barnes-Mileham	62.10 m (203 ft 8 in)	Carol Cady	61.98 m (203 ft 4 in)	Penny Neer	60.70 m (199 ft 1 in)
Javelin throw	Donna Mayhew	59.38 m (194 ft 9 in)	Lynda Sutfin	55.30 m (181 ft 5 in)	Marilyn Senz	54.91 m (180 ft 1 in)
Heptathlon	Sheila Tarr	5881w	Cathey Tyree	5861w	Teri LeBlanc	5518w

== See also ==
- United States Olympic Trials (track and field)
