= 1988 Pan American Race Walking Cup =

- Organisers: Pan American Race Walking Committee
- Edition: 3rd
- Date: 12–13 November
- Host city: Mar del Plata, Buenos Aires, Argentina
- Venue: Boulevard Marítimo Félix U. Camet
- Events: 3
- Participation: 74 athletes from 9 nations

The 1988 Pan American Race Walking Cup was held in Mar del Plata, Buenos Aires, Argentina, on 12–13 November. The track of the Cup runs in the Boulevard Marítimo Félix U. Camet.

Complete results, medal winners until 2011, and the results for the Mexican athletes were published.

== Medallists ==
Event	Gold		Silver		Bronze	
Men
20 km walk	Carlos Mercenario (MEX)	1:24:00	Ernesto Canto (MEX)	1:25:15	Guillaume LeBlanc (CAN)	1:27:08
50 km walk	Martín Bermúdez (MEX)	4:03:20	Arturo Bravo (MEX)	4:06:55	Víctor Sánchez (MEX)	4:10:26
Men (Team)
Team 20 km walk	United States	34 pts	(Mexico) México	30 pts	Argentina	22 pts
Team 50 km walk	(Mexico) México	43 pts	United States	32 pts	Venezuela	22 pts
Women
10 km walk	Ann Peel (CAN)	46:23	María de la Luz Colín (MEX)	46:33	Debbi Lawrence (USA)	46:44
Women (Team)
Team 10 km walk	Canada	48 pts	United States	39 pts	(Mexico) México	39 pts

== Results ==
=== Men's 20 km ===
Place	Athlete	Time
1st place, gold medalist(s)	Carlos Mercenario MEX	1:24:00
2nd place, silver medalist(s)	Ernesto Canto MEX	1:25:15
3rd place, bronze medalist(s)	Guillaume LeBlanc CAN	1:27:08
4	Tim Lewis USA	1:28:14
5	Cláudio Bertolino BRA	1:31:00
6	Carl Schueler USA	1:31:39
7	Michael Stauch USA	1:32:30
8	Jorge Yannone ARG	1:33:09
9	Mario Rodríguez PAN	1:34:15
10	César Martínez VEN	1:34:39
11	Fernando Laterza ARG	1:35:03
12	Luis Parada CHI	1:35:37
13	Gary Morgan USA	1:35:52
14	Benjamín Loréfice ARG	1:36:35
15	Cicero Sabino de Moura BRA	1:38:56
16	Eliu Barrera CHI	1:40:09
17	Pedro Araújo BRA	1:40:16
18	Ramón Guerrero VEN	1:40:39
19	Josimar de Carvalho BRA	1:46:45
—	Joel Sánchez MEX	DQ
—	Omar Castillo VEN	DQ
—	Jorge Loréfice ARG	DQ
—	David Mendoza VEN	DQ
—	Alberto Cruz MEX	DQ

==== Team ====
Place	Country	Points
1st place, gold medalist(s)	United States	34 pts
2nd place, silver medalist(s)	(Mexico) México	30 pts
3rd place, bronze medalist(s)	Argentina	22 pts
4	Brazil	21 pts
5	Venezuela	11 pts

=== Men's 50 km ===
Place	Athlete	Time
1st place, gold medalist(s)	Martín Bermúdez MEX	4:03:20
2nd place, silver medalist(s)	Arturo Bravo MEX	4:06:55
3rd place, bronze medalist(s)	Víctor Sánchez MEX	4:10:26
4	Martin Archambault CAN	4:12:09
5	Herman Nelson USA	4:15:01
6	Paul Wick USA	4:21:36
7	Lino Páez VEN	4:26:42
8	Eugene Kitts USA	4:36:18
9	Juan Yáñez VEN	4:36:44
10	Ademir Domingues BRA	4:46:52
11	Antônio Kohler BRA	4:47:30
12	Roberto Villalorenzo ARG	4:47:53
13	Argenis Guevara VEN	4:52:17
14	Nelson Ferreira Rocha BRA	4:54:08
15	Jorge Osvaldo Linari ARG	5:01:22
16	Antonio Deierolamo ARG	5:24:03
—	Juan Limpio VEN	DQ
—	Hernán Andrade MEX	DQ
—	Alberto Hidalgo ARG	DNF
—	Eliu Barrera CHI	DNF
—	Marco Evoniuk USA	DNF
—	Claudio Fernandes BRA	DNF
—	Luis Parada CHI	DNF

==== Team ====
Place	Country	Points
1st place, gold medalist(s)	(Mexico) México	43 pts
2nd place, silver medalist(s)	United States	32 pts
3rd place, bronze medalist(s)	Venezuela	22 pts
4	Brazil	16 pts
5	Argentina	8 pts

=== Women's 10 km ===
Place	Athlete	Time
1st place, gold medalist(s)	Ann Peel CAN	46:23
2nd place, silver medalist(s)	María de la Luz Colín MEX	46:33
3rd place, bronze medalist(s)	Debbi Lawrence USA	46:44
4	Janice McCaffrey CAN	46:45
5	Alison Baker CAN	47:17
6	Graciela Mendoza MEX	48:32
7	Pascale Grand CAN	48:35
8	Maryanne Torrellas USA	49:02
9	Deborah Powell CAN	49:07
10	Wendy Sharp USA	49:09
11	Sara Standley USA	50:51
12	Rosemar Piazza BRA	54:02
13	Carla Castro MEX	54:03
14	Ivana Rubia Henn BRA	54:34
15	Maritza Aragón VEN	54:42
16	Ofelia Puyol ARG	54:50
17	Marcela León ARG	54:58
18	Claudia Córdoba ARG	56:12
19	Mirta Casal ARG	56:19
20	Denise Volker BRA	58:38
21	Ivonne da Silva BRA	59:46
22	Janette Bougeart VEN	1:00:37
—	Francisca Martínez MEX	DQ
—	Teresa Vaill USA	DQ
—	Allison Castillo DOM	DQ
—	Lourdes Lora DOM	DQ
—	Carmen Arvelo VEN	DQ

==== Team ====
Place	Country	Points
1st place, gold medalist(s)	Canada	48 pts
2nd place, silver medalist(s)	United States	39 pts
3rd place, bronze medalist(s)	(Mexico) México	39 pts
4	Brazil	21 pts
5	Argentina	15 pts
6	Venezuela	9 pts

== Participation ==
The participation of 74 athletes from 9 countries is reported.

- Argentina (12)
- Brazil (12)
- Canada (7)
- Chile (2)
- Dominican Republic (2)
- (Mexico) México (12)
- (Panama) Panamá (1)
- United States (13)
- Venezuela (11)

== See also ==
- 1988 Race Walking Year Ranking
