= 1986 European Athletics Championships – Men's 50 kilometres walk =

Men's 50 kilometres walk at the European Athletics Championships

These are the official results of the Men's 50 km walk event at the 1986 European Championships in Stuttgart, West Germany, held on 31 August 1986.

== Medalists ==
Gold	Hartwig Gauder; East Germany
Silver	Vyacheslav Ivanenko; Soviet Union
Bronze	Valeriy Suntsov; Soviet Union

== Abbreviations ==
- All times shown are in hours:minutes:seconds

DNS	did not start
NM	no mark
WR	world record
WL	world leading
AR	area record
NR	national record
PB	personal best
SB	season best

== Final ==
Rank	Final	Time
	Hartwig Gauder (GDR)	3:40.55
	Vyacheslav Ivanenko (URS)	3:41.54
	Valeriy Suntsov (URS)	3:42.38
4.	Sergey Protsyshin (URS)	3:45.51
5.	Reima Salonen (FIN)	3:46.14
6.	Dietmar Meisch (GDR)	3:48.01
7.	Bo Gustafsson (SWE)	3:50.13
8.	Pavol Szikora (TCH)	3:51.35
9.	Jordi Llopart (ESP)	3:52.12
10.	Erling Andersen (NOR)	3:53.42
11.	Sandro Bellucci (ITA)	3:54.10
12.	Grzegorz Ledzion (POL)	3:54.16
13.	Raffaello Ducceschi (ITA)	3:56.42
14.	Alain Lemercier (FRA)	3:59.11
15.	Martial Fesselier (FRA)	3:59.44
16.	Lars Ove Moen (NOR)	4:05.01
17.	Ivo Piták (TCH)	4:14.32
18.	Dennis Jackson (GBR)	4:16.42
19.	Roland Nilsson (SWE)	4:24.02
20.	Roman Mrázek (TCH)	4:27.28
21.	Martin Toporek (AUT)	4:33.38
22.	Thomas Pomozi (SWE)	4:43.11
—	Ronald Weigel (GDR)	DSQ
—	Les Morton (GBR)	DSQ
—	Alfons Schwarz (FRG)	DNF
—	Maurizio Damilano (ITA)	DNF
—	Manuel Alcalde (ESP)	DNF
—	José Pinto (POR)	DNF

== Participation ==
According to an unofficial count, 28 athletes from 14 countries participated in the event.

- Austria (1)
- Czechoslovakia (3)
- East Germany (3)
- Finland (1)
- France (2)
- Italy (3)
- Norway (2)
- Poland (1)
- Portugal (1)
- Soviet Union (3)
- Spain (2)
- Sweden (3)
- United Kingdom (2)
- West Germany (1)

== See also ==
- 1980 Men's Olympic 50km Walk (Moscow)
- 1982 Men's European Championships 50km Walk (Athens)
- 1983 Men's World Championships 50km Walk (Helsinki)
- 1984 Men's Olympic 50km Walk (Los Angeles)
- 1987 Men's World Championships 50km Walk (Rome)
- 1988 Men's Olympic 50km Walk (Seoul)
- 1990 Men's European Championships 50km Walk (Split)
