= 1987 USA Indoor Track and Field Championships =

National athletics championship event

- Dates: February 27
- Host city: New York City, New York, United States
- Venue: Madison Square Garden
- Level: Senior
- Type: Indoor
- Events: 25 (14 men's + 11 women's)

The 1987 USA Indoor Track and Field Championships were held at Madison Square Garden in New York City, New York. Organized by The Athletics Congress (TAC), the competition took place on February 27 and served as the national championships in indoor track and field for the United States.

The competition acted as a qualifier for the U.S. team at the 1987 World Indoor Championships in Athletics. At the meeting, East Germany's Heike Drechsler set a world indoor record in the long jump despite being restricted by a "short pit".

== Medal summary ==
=== Men ===
Event	Gold		Silver		Bronze	
55 m	Lee McRae	6.14				
400 m	Antonio McKay	47.00				
500 m	Ian Morris (TRI)	1:01.55	Elvis Forde (BAR)	1:01.58	Chip Jenkins	1:01.89
800 m	Stanley Redwine	1:48.13				
Mile run	Eamonn Coghlan (IRL)	3:59.25	Ray Flynn (IRL)	4:00.18	Jim Spivey	4:00.58
3000 m	Doug Padilla	7:51.03				
55 m hurdles	Greg Foster	6.99				
High jump	Igor Paklin (URS)	2.33 m	Jimmy Howard	7 ft 6 in (2.28 m)		
Pole vault	Earl Bell	5.72 m				
Long jump	Brian Cooper	8.22 m				
Triple jump	Mike Conley	17.76 m				
Shot put	Ulf Timmermann (GDR)	21.63 m	Sergey Smirnov (URS)	67 ft 11 3/4 in (20.72 m)	Ron Backes	67 ft 11 in (20.7 m)
Weight throw	Lance Deal	22.68 m				
5000 m walk	Tim Lewis	19:30.70				

=== Women ===
Event	Gold		Silver		Bronze	
55 m	Anelia Nuneva (BUL)	6.64	Jeanette Bolden	6.79		
200 m	Grace Jackson (JAM)	23.51	Valerie Brisco	23.58		
400 m	Diane Dixon	52.20				
800 m	Christine Wachtel (GDR)	2:03.51	Svetlana Kitova (URS)	2:03.97	Joetta Clark	2:04.05
Mile run	Doina Melinte (ROM)	4:30.29	Darlene Beckford	4:33.53		
3000 m	Maricica Puica (ROM)	8:43.49	Lesley Welch	8:44.68		
55 m hurdles	Cornelia Oschkenat (GDR)	7.37	Yordanka Donkova (BUL)	7.49	Jackie Joyner-Kersee	7.64
High jump (Note: The top American and U.S. champion was Rita Graves in 4th place, who jumped 6 ft 1 1/2 in (1.86 m) and lost to Debbie Brill on countback.)	Tamara Bykova (URS)	1.92 m	Susanne Beyer-Helm (GDR)	1.92 m	Debbie Brill (CAN)	6 ft 1 1/2 in (1.86 m)
Long jump	Heike Drechsler (GDR)	7.32 m	Galina Chistyakova (URS)	6.80 m	Carol Lewis	6.69 m
Shot put	Ilona Briesenick (GDR)	20.23 m	Ramona Pagel	64 ft 0 1/2 in (19.51 m)		
3000 m walk	Maryanne Torrellas	13:05.41				
