= Athletics at the 1987 Summer Universiade – Men's 20 kilometres walk =

The men's 20 kilometres walk event at the 1987 Summer Universiade was held in Zagreb on 13 July 1987.

== Results ==
Rank	Athlete	Nationality	Time	Notes
1st place, gold medalist(s)	Raffaello Ducceschi	Italy	1:25:02	
2nd place, silver medalist(s)	Giacomo Poggi	Italy	1:25:17	
3rd place, bronze medalist(s)	Pierluigi Fiorella	Italy	1:26:58	
4	Andrew Jachno	Australia	1:27:39	
5	Pyotr Kakhnovich	Soviet Union	1:30:42	
6	Luis Maroto	Spain	1:30:51	
7	Eric Neisse	France	1:31:00	
8	Paul Wick	United States	1:31:18	
9	Martin Rush	Great Britain	1:32:34	
10	Carlos Montes	Spain	1:32:59	
11	Eric Ledune	Belgium	1:33:26	
12	Štefan Malík	Czechoslovakia	1:34:24	
13	Erling Andersen	Norway	1:35:11	
14	Jerzy Wróblewicz	Poland	1:35:23	
18	Paul Turpin	Canada	1:43:58	
19	Paulo Vidales	Mexico	1:50:41	
	François Lapointe	Canada	DNF	
	Lyubomir Ivanov	Bulgaria	DNF	
	Philippe Burton	Belgium	DNF	
	Hakan Çalışkan	Canada	DQ	
