= 1981 European Athletics Indoor Championships – Men's 5000 metres walk =

The men's 5000 metres walk event at the 1981 European Athletics Indoor Championships was held on 22 February. It was the first time that race walking was contested at the championships.

== Results ==
Rank	Name	Nationality	Time	Notes
1st place, gold medalist(s)	Hartwig Gauder	East Germany	19:08.59	CR
2nd place, silver medalist(s)	Maurizio Damilano	Italy	19:13.90	
3rd place, bronze medalist(s)	Gérard Lelièvre	France	19:55.02	
4	Giorgio Damilano	Italy	20:31.97	
5	Dominique Guebey	France	20:41.25	
6	Pascal Lenglart	France	21:41.37	
7	Roger Mills	Great Britain	22:08.87	
