= Raffaello Ducceschi =

Italian race walker

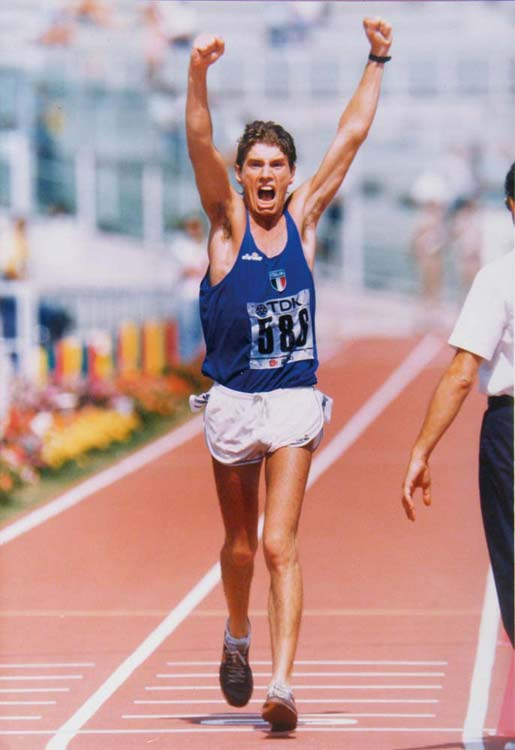
- Ducceschi in 1987

Personal information
- Full name: Raffaello Fabio Ducceschi
- National team: Italy: 11 caps (1983-1989)
- Born: 25 February 1962 (age 64) Sesto San Giovanni, Italy
- Height: 1.83 m (6 ft 0 in)
- Weight: 63 kg (139 lb)

Sport
- Sport: Athletics
- Event: Race walk
- Club: G.S. Fiamme Oro
- Retired: 1992

Achievements and titles
- Personal bests: 20 km walk: 1:24:55 (1984); 50 km walk: 3:44.27 (1988)
Medal record
Universiade
Gold medal – first place	1987 Zagreb	20 km walk
World Race Walking Cup
Silver medal – second place	1987 New York City	Team
Silver medal – second place	1989 L'Hospitalet	Team
Bronze medal – third place	1985 St. John's	Team

Raffaello Ducceschi (born 25 February 1962) is an Italian former race walker who took fifth and eighth place in two Olympic Games.

== Biography ==
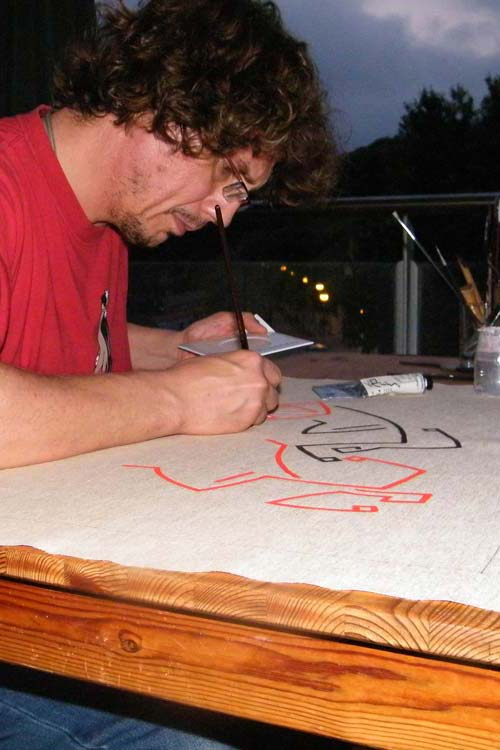
Ducceschi at work in Barcelona

Ducceschi won one medal, at individual level, at the International athletics competitions. He participated at two Summer Olympic Games (1984 and 1988), he has 11 caps in national team from 1983 to 1989.

Twice a finalist in the 50 kilometres race walk at the Olympic Games (in Los Angeles 1984 and Seoul 1988), his best result was the 1987 World Championships in Athletics, when though struck with dysentery during the race and being forced to stop along the roadside several times, he was able to reach the finish line, taking fourth place.

He was trained from 1980 to 1984 by Roberto Vanzillotta, 1985–1986 by Antonio La Torre, the first half of 1987 by Peter Pastorini, and from May 1987 to all of 1988 by Sandro Damilano in Saluzzo with Maurizio and Giorgio Damilano.

Having carried out a career as an athlete, Duccechi moved to Barcelona, Spain, where he is a professional graphic designer and teaches at the university. Since 2001 he has been practicing and teaching Fitwalking.

== Statistics ==
=== National records ===
- 50 km walk: 3:44:27 ( (Italy) Molfetta, 17 April 1988) until 13 August 1994

=== Personal bests ===
- 10 km walk (track): 40:56 ( (Italy) Cittadella, 10 May 1987)
- 20 km walk: 1:24:55 ( (Italy) Piacenza, 13 May 1984)
- 20 km walk (track) 1:27:28 ( (Italy) Mestre, 14 April 1984)
- 50 km walk: 3:44:27 ( (Italy) Molfetta, 17 April 1988)

=== Progression ===
Personal Best

50 km walk

Year	Time	Venue	Date
1988	3:44:27	(Italy) Molfetta	17 April
1987	3:47:49	(Italy) Rome	5 September
1986	3:56:42	(West Germany) Stuttgart	31 August
1984	3:59:26	(United States) Los Angeles	11 August

=== Achievements ===
Year	Competition	Venue	Position	Event	Time	Notes
1984	Olympic Games	(United States) Los Angeles	5th	50 km	3:59:26	
1985	World Race Walking Cup	(United Kingdom) St John's	5th	50 km	3:59:55	
1985	World Race Walking Cup	(United Kingdom) St John's	3rd	Team	233 pts	
1986	European Championships	(West Germany) Stuttgart	13th	50 km	3:56.42	
1987	World Student Games	(Socialist Federal Republic of Yugoslavia) Zagreb	1st	20 km	1.25:02	
1987	World Race Walking Cup	(United States) New York City	10th	50 km	3:52:29	
1987	World Race Walking Cup	(United States) New York City	2nd	Team	569 pts	
1987	World Championships	(Italy) Rome	4th	50 km	3:47.49	
1988	Olympic Games	(South Korea) Seoul	8th	50 km	3:45:43	
1989	World Race Walking Cup	(Spain) L'Hospitalet	35th	50 km	4:09:06	
1989	World Race Walking Cup	(Spain) L'Hospitalet	2nd	Team	534 pts	

=== National titles ===
Ducceschi won three national championships at individual senior level.

- Italian Athletics Championships
  - 50 km walk: 1983, 1984, 1988 (3)

== Honours ==

CONI: Golden Collar of Sports Merit: Collare d'Oro al Merito Sportivo

== See also ==
- Italian all-time lists - 50 km walk
- Italian team at the running events
- Italy at the IAAF World Race Walking Cup
- Italy at the European Race Walking Cup
