= 1987 World Championships in Athletics – Men's 50 kilometres walk =

These are the official results of the Men's 50 km Walk event at the 1987 World Championships in Rome, Italy. The race was held on Saturday September 5, 1987.

== Medalists ==
Gold	Hartwig Gauder; East Germany (GDR)
Silver	Ronald Weigel; East Germany (GDR)
Bronze	Vyacheslav Ivanenko; Soviet Union (URS)

== Abbreviations ==
- All times shown are in hours:minutes:seconds

DNS	did not start
NM	no mark
WR	world record
WL	world leading
AR	area record
NR	national record
PB	personal best
SB	season best

== Records ==
Existing records at the start of the event.

World Record	Ronald Weigel (GDR)	3:38:17	Potsdam, East Germany	May 25, 1986
Championship Record	Ronald Weigel (GDR)	3:43.08	Helsinki, Finland	August 12, 1983

== Final ==
RANK	FINAL	TIME
	Hartwig Gauder (GDR)	3:40.53 CR
	Ronald Weigel (GDR)	3:41.30
	Vyacheslav Ivanenko (URS)	3:44.02
4.	Raffaello Ducceschi (ITA)	3:47.49
5.	Martín Bermúdez (MEX)	3:48.27
6.	Sandro Bellucci (ITA)	3:48.52
7.	Pavol Szikora (TCH)	3:49.44
8.	Arturo Bravo (MEX)	3:52.08
9.	Andres Marín (ESP)	3:52.16
10.	Godfried Dejonckheere (BEL)	3:52.21
11.	Raúl González (MEX)	3:53.30
12.	Erling Andersen (NOR)	3:55.52
13.	François Lapointe (CAN)	3:56.11
14.	Thierry Toutain (FRA)	3:56.34
15.	José Pinto (POR)	3:56.40
16.	Carl Schueler (USA)	3:57.09
17.	Marco Evoniuk (USA)	3:57.43
18.	Pavol Blažek (TCH)	3:58.43
19.	Paul Blagg (GBR)	3:59.55
20.	Jan Cortenbach (NED)	4:00.10
21.	Takehiro Sonohara (JPN)	4:00.11
22.	Jim Heiring (USA)	4:03.34
23.	Alain Lemercier (FRA)	4:09.53
24.	Denis Terraz (FRA)	4:10.55
25.	Michael Harvey (AUS)	4:11.04
26.	Willi Sawall (AUS)	4:14.25
27.	Martin Archambault (CAN)	4:26.03
—	Reima Salonen (FIN)	DNF
—	Manuel Alcalde (ESP)	DNF
—	Jordi Llopart (ESP)	DSQ
—	Bo Gustafsson (SWE)	DSQ
—	Vesa Puukari (FIN)	DSQ
—	Grzegorz Ledzion (POL)	DSQ
—	Giacomo Poggi (ITA)	DSQ
—	Dietmar Meisch (GDR)	DSQ
—	Valeriy Suntsov (URS)	DSQ
—	Venyamin Nikolayev (URS)	DSQ

== See also ==
- 1978 Men's European Championships 50km Walk (Prague)
- 1980 Men's Olympic 50km Walk (Moscow)
- 1982 Men's European Championships 50km Walk (Athens)
- 1984 Men's Olympic 50km Walk (Los Angeles)
- 1986 Men's European Championships 50km Walk (Stuttgart)
- 1987 Race Walking Year Ranking
- 1988 Men's Olympic 50km Walk (Seoul)
- 1990 Men's European Championships 50km Walk (Split)
