= 1986 Pan American Race Walking Cup =

- Organisers: Pan American Race Walking Committee
- Edition: 2nd
- Date: 3–4 October
- Host city: Saint Léonard, Québec, Canada
- Venue: Boulevard Lacordaire
- Events: 3
- Participation: 67 athletes from 9 nations

The 1986 Pan American Race Walking Cup was held in Saint Léonard, Québec, Canada, on 3–4 October. The track of the Cup runs in the Boulevard Lacordaire.

Complete results, medal winners until 2011, and the results for the Mexican athletes were published.

== Medallists ==
Event	Gold		Silver		Bronze	
Men
20 km walk	Guillaume LeBlanc (CAN)	1:21:13	Carlos Mercenario (MEX)	1:21:33	Tim Lewis (USA)	1:21:48
50 km walk	Martín Bermúdez (MEX)	3:56:21	Marco Evoniuk (USA)	4:05:56	Hugo López (MEX)	4:07:53
Men (Team)
Team 20 km walk	(Mexico) México	53 pts	Colombia	51 pts	United States	49 pts
Team 50 km walk	(Mexico) México	31 pts	United States	24 pts	Canada	14 pts
Women
10 km walk	Graciela Mendoza (MEX)	45:23	Ann Peel (CAN)	45:26	María de la Luz Colín (MEX)	45:33
Women (Team)
Team 10 km walk	(Mexico) México	31 pts	Canada	24 pts	United States	18 pts

== Results ==
=== Men's 20 km ===
Place	Athlete	Time
1st place, gold medalist(s)	Guillaume LeBlanc CAN	1:21:13
2nd place, silver medalist(s)	Carlos Mercenario MEX	1:21:33
3rd place, bronze medalist(s)	Tim Lewis USA	1:21:48
4	Viliulfo Andablo MEX	1:22:39
5	Héctor Moreno COL	1:24:02
6	Querubín Moreno COL	1:24:16
7	Francisco Vargas COL	1:24:24
8	Ray Sharp USA	1:24:58
9	Carl Schueler USA	1:25:04
10	Joel Sánchez MEX	1:25:50
11	Michel Lafortune CAN	1:28:19
12	Paul Turpin CAN	1:28:19
13	Enrique Peña COL	1:30:28
14	José Víctor Alonzo GUA	1:30:46
15	Daniel Lévesque CAN	1:31:06
16	Omar Guerrero VEN	1:36:02
17	Nelson Funes GUA	1:38:57
18	José Rene Miranda PUR	1:41:46
19	Jorge Osvaldo Linari ARG	1:42:01
20	Raphael Marín VEN	1:44:16
21	Javier Cotto PUR	1:44:40
22	David Mendoza VEN	1:48:27
23	Henry Mercado PUR	1:51:27
24	Jorge Casco HON	2:10:01
—	Michael Stauch USA	DQ
—	Alberto Miranda PUR	DNF
—	Ernesto Canto MEX	DNF

==== Team ====
Place	Country	Points
1st place, gold medalist(s)	(Mexico) México	53 pts
2nd place, silver medalist(s)	Colombia	51 pts
3rd place, bronze medalist(s)	United States	49 pts
4	Canada	45 pts
5	Guatemala	18 pts
6	Venezuela	17 pts
7	Puerto Rico	13 pts

=== Men's 50 km ===
Place	Athlete	Time
1st place, gold medalist(s)	Martín Bermúdez MEX	3:56:21
2nd place, silver medalist(s)	Marco Evoniuk USA	4:05:56
3rd place, bronze medalist(s)	Hugo López MEX	4:07:53
4	Marcelino Colín MEX	4:11:17
5	Dan O'Connor USA	4:18:46
6	François Lapointe CAN	4:20:35
7	Carlos Ramones VEN	4:26:31
8	Javier Rodríguez MEX	4:27:12
9	Eugene Kitts USA	4:29:08
10	Mark Henderson CAN	4:36:07
11	Iván Hernández PUR	4:37:18
12	Glenn Sweazey CAN	4:37:28
13	Santiago Fonseca HON	4:38:32
14	Juan Yáñez VEN	4:39:56
15	Omar Castillo VEN	4:45:45
16	Jaan Roos CAN	4:48:47
17	Juan Limpio VEN	4:56:47
—	Luis Montes PUR	DNF
—	Randolph Mimm USA	DNF

==== Team ====
Place	Country	Points
1st place, gold medalist(s)	(Mexico) México	31 pts
2nd place, silver medalist(s)	United States	24 pts
3rd place, bronze medalist(s)	Canada	14 pts
4	Venezuela	9 pts

=== Women's 20 km ===
Place	Athlete	Time
1st place, gold medalist(s)	Graciela Mendoza MEX	45:23
2nd place, silver medalist(s)	Ann Peel CAN	45:26
3rd place, bronze medalist(s)	María de la Luz Colín MEX	45:33
4	Teresa Vaill USA	46:47
5	María del Carmen Hidalgo MEX	48:19
6	Deborah Powell CAN	48:23
7	Lora Rigutto CAN	48:46
8	Alison Baker CAN	49:04
9	Deborah Lawrence USA	49:05
10	Louise Aubin CAN	49:49
11	Mary Howell USA	49:59
12	Lisa Vaill USA	50:00
13	Micheline Daneau CAN	50.01
14	Meg Mangan USA	50:46
15	Pascale Grand CAN	50:49
16	Susan Liers USA	51:16
17	Gwen Robertson USA	51.29
18	Carol Brown USA	52:44
19	Christine Ostiguy CAN	54:15
20	Liliana Bermeo COL	57:40
—	Marisela Chávez MEX	DQ

==== Team ====
Place	Country	Points
1st place, gold medalist(s)	(Mexico) México	31 pts
2nd place, silver medalist(s)	Canada	24 pts
3rd place, bronze medalist(s)	United States	18 pts
4	Colombia	3 pts

== Participation ==
The participation of 67 athletes from 9 countries is reported.

- Argentina (1)
- Canada (16)
- Colombia (5)
- Guatemala (2)
- Honduras (2)
- (Mexico) México (12)
- Puerto Rico (6)
- United States (17)
- Venezuela (7)

== See also ==
- 1986 Race Walking Year Ranking
