= Brian Cooper (sprinter) =

American sprinter

Personal information
- Nationality: American
- Born: August 21, 1965 (age 60) Portsmouth, Virginia
- Height: 5 ft 11 in (1.80 m)
- Weight: 175 lb (79 kg)

Sport
- Country: United States
- Sport: Running
- Event: Sprints
- College team: McNeese State Cowboys
- Club: Santa Monica Track Club

Achievements and titles
- Personal best: 100 m: 10.07 s (Tampa 1988)
Medal record
Representing United States
Summer Universiade
Gold medal – first place	1987 Zagreb	100m
Silver medal – second place	1987 Zagreb	4x100m relay

Brian Cooper (born August 21, 1965) is a former American sprinter and long jumper. He finished second in the 100 metres at the 1988 USA Outdoor Track and Field Championships, behind Emmit King, with his personal best of 10.01 seconds. In 1990, he won the 55 metres at the USA Indoor Track and Field Championships.

Born in Portsmouth, Virginia, Cooper attended McNeese State University before dropping out in 1988 to train with Carl Lewis and other sprinters in Houston.

Cooper was also an accomplished long jumper, having won the 1987 USA Indoor Track and Field Championships in that event.
