= Athletics at the 1990 Commonwealth Games – Men's 30 kilometres walk =

Men's 30 kilometres walk at the Commonwealth Games

The men's 30 kilometres walk event at the 1990 Commonwealth Games was held on 2 February in Auckland.

== Results ==
Rank	Name	Nationality	Time	Notes
1st place, gold medalist(s)	Guillaume LeBlanc	Canada	2:08:28	
2nd place, silver medalist(s)	Andrew Jachno	Australia	2:09:09	
3rd place, bronze medalist(s)	Ian McCombie	England	2:09:20	
4	François Lapointe	Canada	2:12:41	
5	Mark Easton	England	2:14:52	
6	Chris Maddocks	England	2:15:07	
7	Simon Baker	Australia	2:19:55	
7	Paul Copeland	Australia	2:19:55	
9	Steve Partington	Isle of Man	2:20:11	
10	Shane Donnelly	New Zealand	2:24:01	
11	Martin Archambault	Canada	2:29:22	
12	Sean Sullivan	New Zealand	2:35:40	
	Moetu Tangitamaiti	Cook Islands	DNF	
