= Gummelt =

Gummelt is a surname. Notable people with the surname include:

- Bernd Gummelt (born 1963), German race walker
- Beate Gummelt (born 1968), German race walker
