= Stefan Wögerbauer =

Austrian racewalker

Stephan Wögerbauer
Personal information
- Nationality: Austrian
- Born: 3 November 1959 (age 66) Linz

Sport
- Sport: Athletics
- Event: Racewalking

Stephan Wögerbauer (born 3 November 1959) is an Austrian racewalker. He competed in the men's 50 kilometres walk at the 1992 Summer Olympics.
