= Athletics at the 1982 Commonwealth Games – Men's 30 kilometres walk =

Men's 30 kilometres walk at the Commonwealth Games

The men's 30 kilometres walk event at the 1982 Commonwealth Games was held on 7 October at the QE II Stadium in Brisbane, Australia.

== Results ==
Rank	Name	Nationality	Time	Notes
1st place, gold medalist(s)	Steve Barry	Wales	2:10:16	
2nd place, silver medalist(s)	Marcel Jobin	Canada	2:12:24	
3rd place, bronze medalist(s)	Guillaume LeBlanc	Canada	2:14:56	
4	Willi Sawall	Australia	2:15:23	
5	François Lapointe	Canada	2:17:02	
6	Timothy Erickson	Australia	2:19:45	
7	Roger Mills	England	2:21:54	
8	Murray Lambden	Isle of Man	2:22:18	
9	Andrew Jackno	Australia	2:24:15	
10	Robert Elliott	Guernsey	2:24:28	
11	Mike Parker	New Zealand	2:26:07	
12	Graham Young	Isle of Man	2:27:04	
13	Paul Blagg	England	2:30:42	
14	Mutai Kiplangat	Kenya	2:34:51	
15	Kevin Taylor	New Zealand	2:37:37	
16	Elisha Kasuku	Kenya	2:39:32	
17	John Mutinda	Kenya	2:50:54	
	Chand Ram	India	DNF	
	Robert Lambie	Isle of Man	DQ	
