= Jean-Marie Neff =

French racewalker (born 1961)

Jean-Marie Neff (born 29 September 1961 in Sainte-Marie-aux-Mines) is a retired male race walker from France, who competed for his native country at the 1988 Summer Olympics.

== Achievements ==
Year	Competition	Venue	Position	Notes
Representing France
1988	Olympic Games	Seoul, South Korea	DSQ	50 km
