= Sandro Damilano =

Italian athletics coach

Personal information
- Born: 24 February 1950 (age 75) Scarnafigi, Italy

Sport
- Country: Italy
- Sport: Athletics
- Event: Race walking

Sandro Damilano (born 24 February 1950) is an Italian athletics coach.

He is the brother of the Italian twin race walker Maurizio and Giorgio, which began to coached in the mid-1970s.

== Biography ==
He was the coach of the Italy national athletics team until 2011, he coached Italian champion Elisabetta Perrone, Erica Alfridi and after also Alex Schwazer. In 2012 he is the coach of the Chinese national of race walking.

He is one of the coaches of the Saluzzo Race Walking School, created by the town of Saluzzo in 2002, the school is also the center for the diffusion of fitwalking and training center of international race walking.

== See also ==
- Maurizio Damilano
- Giorgio Damilano
- Power walking
- Saluzzo Race Walking School
