= Athletics at the 1988 Summer Olympics – Men's 50 kilometres walk =

Men's 50 kilometres walk at the Games of the XXIV Olympiad
- Venue: Seoul Olympic Stadium
- Date: September 30
- Competitors: 42 from 22 nations
- Winning time: 3:38:29 OR

Medalists
1st place, gold medalist(s)		Vyacheslav Ivanenko; Soviet Union
2nd place, silver medalist(s)		Ronald Weigel; East Germany
3rd place, bronze medalist(s)		Hartwig Gauder; East Germany

The Men's 50 km Race Walk event at the 1988 Summer Olympics in Seoul, South Korea had an entry list of 42 competitors. Three athletes were disqualified, while four walkers did not finish the race, held on Friday September 30, 1988.

== Medalists ==
Gold	Vyacheslav Ivanenko; Soviet Union
Silver	Ronald Weigel; East Germany
Bronze	Hartwig Gauder; East Germany

== Abbreviations ==
- All times shown are in hours:minutes:seconds

DNS	did not start
NM	no mark
OR	olympic record
WR	world record
AR	area record
NR	national record
PB	personal best
SB	season best

== Records ==
Standing records prior to the 1988 Summer Olympics
World Record	Ronald Weigel (GDR)	3:38.17	May 25, 1986	Potsdam, East Germany
Olympic Record	Raúl González (MEX)	3:47.26	August 11, 1984	Los Angeles, United States
Broken records during the 1988 Summer Olympics
Olympic Record	Vyacheslav Ivanenko (URS)	3:38.29	September 30, 1988	Seoul, South Korea

== Final ranking ==
Rank	Athlete	Time	Note
1st place, gold medalist(s)	Vyacheslav Ivanenko (URS)	3:38:29	OR
2nd place, silver medalist(s)	Ronald Weigel (GDR)	3:38:56	
3rd place, bronze medalist(s)	Hartwig Gauder (GDR)	3:39:45	
4	Aleksandr Potashov (URS)	3:41:00	
5	José Marín (ESP)	3:43:03	
6	Simon Baker (AUS)	3:44:07	
7	Bo Gustafsson (SWE)	3:44:49	
8	Raffaello Ducceschi (ITA)	3:45:43	
9	Dietmar Meisch (GDR)	3:46:31	
10	Pavol Szikora (TCH)	3:47:04	
11	Giovanni Perricelli (ITA)	3:47:14	
12	Pavol Blažek (TCH)	3:47:31	
13	Jorge Llopart (ESP)	3:48:09	
14	François Lapointe (CAN)	3:48:15	
15	Martín Bermúdez (MEX)	3:49:22	
16	Alain Lemercier (FRA)	3:50:28	
17	Roman Mrázek (TCH)	3:50:46	
18	Reima Salonen (FIN)	3:51:36	
19	Andrew Jachno (AUS)	3:53:23	
20	Stefan Johansson (SWE)	3:53:34	
21	José Pinto (POR)	3:55:57	
22	Marco Evoniuk (USA)	3:56:55	
23	Carl Schueler (USA)	3:57:44	
24	Jacek Bednarek (POL)	3:58:31	
25	Manuel Alcalde (ESP)	3:59:13	
26	Vitaliy Popovych (URS)	3:59:23	
27	Les Morton (GBR)	3:59:30	
28	Paul Blagg (GBR)	4:00:07	
29	Li Baojin (CHN)	4:00:07	
30	Héctor Moreno (COL)	4:01:31	
31	Tadahiro Kosaka (JPN)	4:03:12	
32	Sandro Bellucci (ITA)	4:04:56	
33	Arturo Bravo (MEX)	4:08:08	
34	Andrew Kaestner (USA)	4:12:49	
35	William Sawe (KEN)	4:25:24	
DID NOT FINISH (DNF)
—	Erling Andersen (NOR)	DNF	
—	Godfried Dejonckheere (BEL)	DNF	
—	Sándor Urbanik (HUN)	DNF	
—	Jan Staaf (SWE)	DNF	
DISQUALIFIED (DSQ)
—	Jean-Marie Neff (FRA)	DSQ	
—	Eric Neisse (FRA)	DSQ	
—	Hernán Andrade (MEX)	DSQ	

== See also ==
- 1987 Men's World Championships 50km Walk (Rome)
- 1988 Race Walking Year Ranking
- 1990 Men's European Championships 50km Walk (Split)
- 1991 Men's World Championships 50km Walk (Tokyo)
