= 55 metres =

Non-Olympic discipline in athletics

55 metres is a sprint event in track and field. It is a relatively uncommon non-championship event for indoor track and field. The history of the event lies in the 60-yard dash, which is about 5 inches shorter than 55 metres. Since the 1960s almost all countries have used metric measurements for track and field, hence the standard sprint distances for indoor competition have been 50 metres and 60 metres.

The single exception to this was the United States, which continued to use imperial measurements. In the 1980s efforts were made to switch track and field in the United States to use metric measurements and the 55 metres was adopted as a close equivalent to 60 yards. The NCAA Indoor Championships featured the event from 1984 to 1998 and the USA Track & Field Indoor Championships featured the event from 1987 to 1990. Subsequently the 55 metres were dropped from American championships in favour of the international standard of 60 metres. Since the late 1990s there have been very few significant open competitions over 55 metres and the event remains something of a historic anomaly. The distance is still frequently run in junior (below college) meets.

== All-time top 25 ==
Indoor results only. Hand-timed results are excluded

The websites of World Athletics and tilastopaja.net are often used to generate lists of top performers. However, the data in these sites is not complete before about 1998 and, as noted above, much of the championship activity in this event (and hence best performances) were before this time. Hence a better source of data is the Track and Field News website.

- A = affected by altitude

=== Men ===
- Updated February 2023

Rank	Time	Athlete	Nationality	Date	Place	Ref.
1	5.99 A	Obadele Thompson	Barbados	22 February 1997	Colorado Springs	
2	6.00	Lee McRae	United States	14 March 1986	Oklahoma City	
3	6.02 A	Leo Myles-Mills	Ghana	22 February 1997	Colorado Springs	
4	6.03	Sam Graddy	United States	14 March 1986	Oklahoma City	
4	6.03 (Note: Converted from a time for the slightly shorter 60 yards by adding 0.01)	Carl Lewis	United States	5 February 1983	Dallas	
4	6.03+	Christian Coleman	United States	11 February 2023	New York City	
7	6.04	André Cason	United States	9 March 1990	Indianapolis	
7	6.04 A	Ato Boldon	Trinidad and Tobago	1 February 1997	Flagstaff	
9	6.05	Brian Cooper	United States	13 February 1988	East Rutherford	
9	6.05	Stanley Floyd	United States	31 January 1981	Dallas	
11	6.06	Tim Harden	United States	9 March 1996	Indianapolis	
11	6.06	Emmit King	United States	26 February 1988	New York City	
11	6.06	Fred Johnson	United States	16 March 1985	Fargo	
11	6.06	Houston McTear	United States	24 February 1978	New York City	
11	6.06 A	Marcus Brunson	United States	20 February 1999	Reno	
11	6.06 A	Felix Andam	Ghana	28 February 1998	Colorado Springs	
11	6.06 A	Syan Williams	Jamaica	14 February 1998	Colorado Springs	
11	6.06 A	Keith Williams	United States	15 February 1997	Colorado Springs	
19	6.07	Leonard Scott	United States	20 February 1999	Gainesville	
19	6.07	Ousmane Diarra	Mali	10 February 1996	Ames	
19	6.07	Raghib Ismail	United States	8 February 1991	West Lafayette	
19	6.07	Ray Stewart	Jamaica	11 March 1989	Indianapolis	
19	6.07	Ron Brown	United States	4 February 1984	Dallas	
19	6.07 A	Obadiah Cooper	United States	21 February 1998	Flagstaff	
25	6.08	Marvin Bracy	United States	29 January 2012	Gainesville	
25	6.08	Michael Green	Jamaica	14 March 1992	Indianapolis	
25	6.08	Phil Epps	United States	5 March 1983	Dallas	
25	6.08	Rod Richardson	United States	13 March 1982	Pontiac	
25	6.08	James Sanford	United States	20 February 1981	San Diego	
25	6.08 A	Bernard Williams	United States	21 February 1998	Colorado Springs	

=== Women ===
- Updated March 2025

Rank	Time	Athlete	Nationality	Date	Place	Ref.
1	6.53+	Jacious Sears	United States	8 February 2025	New York City	
2	6.55	Evelyn Ashford	United States	26 February 1982	New York City	
2	6.55	Jeanette Bolden	United States	21 February 1986	Los Angeles	
4	6.56	Gwen Torrence	United States	14 March 1987	Oklahoma City	
5	6.57	Alice Brown	United States	22 February 1985	New York City	
5	6.57+	Aleia Hobbs	United States	11 February 2023	New York City	
7	6.58	Dawn Sowell	United States	26 February 1989	Baton Rouge	
7	6.58	Beatrice Utondu-Okoye	Nigeria	11 February 1990	Monroe, North Carolina	
7	6.58+	Tamari Davis	United States	11 February 2023	New York City	
10	6.60	Chandra Cheeseborough	United States	5 February 1983	Dallas	
11	6.61	Michelle Finn	United States	23 February 1990	New York City	
12	6.62	Merlene Ottey	Jamaica	13 March 1982	Cedar Falls, Iowa	
12	6.62	Marlies Göhr	East Germany	28 February 1986	New York City	
12	6.62+	Marybeth Sant-Price	United States	11 February 2023	New York City	
15	6.63+	Mikiah Brisco	United States	11 February 2023	New York City	
15	6.63+	Lisa Raye	Trinidad and Tobago	8 February 2025	New York City	
17	6.64	Lyudmila Storozhkova	USSR	3 March 1979	New York City	
17	6.64	Anelia Nuneva	Bulgaria	27 February 1987	New York City	
19	6.65	Florence Griffith	United States	8 February 1985	Inglewood	
19	6.65	Nelli Cooman	Netherlands	30 January 1987	New York City	
19	6.65	Savatheda Fynes	Bahamas	8 March 1997	Indianapolis	
19	6.65+	Celera Barnes	United States	8 February 2025	New York City	
23	6.66	Carlette Guidry	United States	10 March 1990	Indianapolis	
23	6.66	Michelle Freeman	Jamaica	30 January 1993	Johnson City	
25	6.67	Angela Bailey	Canada	28 February 1986	New York City	
25	6.67+	Shawnti Jackson	United States	29 January 2022	New York City	
25	6.67+	Shawnti Jackson	United States	11 February 2023	New York City	
25	6.67+	Melanie Doggett	United States	8 February 2025	New York City	
25	6.67+	Destiny Smith-Barnett	Liberia	8 February 2025	New York City	

==== Notes ====
Below is a list of other times equal or superior to 6.67:

- Aleia Hobbs also ran 6.66+ (2025).

== World leading times ==
=== Men ===
Year	Mark	Athlete	Place
1978	6.06	Houston McTear (USA)	New York City
1979	6.10 A	Jerome Deal (USA)	Albuquerque
1980	6.10	Herkie Walls (USA)	Fort Worth
1980	6.10	Curtis Dickey (USA)	New York City
1981	6.05	Stanley Floyd (USA)	Dallas
1982	6.08	Rod Richardson (USA)	Pontiac
1983	6.03	Carl Lewis (USA)	Dallas
1984	6.07	Emmit King (USA)	Johnson City
1984	6.07	Ron Brown (USA)	Dallas
1985	6.06	Fred Johnson (USA)	Fargo
1986	6.00	Lee McRae (USA)	Oklahoma City
1987	6.04	Lee McRae (USA)	East Rutherford
1988	6.05	Brian Cooper (USA)	East Rutherford
1989	6.07	Ray Stewart (JAM)	Indianapolis
1990	6.04	Andre Cason (USA)	Indianapolis
1991	6.07	Raghib Ismail (USA)	West Lafayette
1992	6.08	Michael Green (JAM)	Indianapolis
1993	6.10	Michael Green (JAM)	Johnson City
1994	6.09	Mark Witherspoon (USA)	Cedar Falls
1995	6.13	Phil Riley (USA)	Gainesville
1996	6.06	Tim Harden (USA)	Indianapolis
1997	5.99 A	Obadele Thompson (BAR)	Colorado Springs
1998	6.06 A	Felix Andam (GHA)	Colorado Springs
1998	6.06 A	Syan Williams (JAM)	Colorado Springs
1999	6.06 A	Marcus Brunson (USA)	Reno
2000	6.11	Ricardo Shaw (USA)	Gainesville
2001	6.10	Leonard Scott (USA)	Knoxville
2002	6.14 A	Ephion Jackson (USA)	Reno
2003	6.10	Mickey Grimes (USA)	Los Angeles
2004	6.20	Chris Johnson (USA)	Jonesboro
2004	6.20	Ricardo Shaw (USA)	Gainesville
2005	6.19	Tyree Gailes (USA)	Lubbock
2006	6.12	Joshua Norman (USA)	Fresno
2007	6.14	Greg Bolden (USA)	Gainesville
2008	6.10	Dallas Robinson (USA)	Maysville
2009	6.17	Josh Norman (USA)	Fresno
2010	6.20	Delannie Spriggs (USA)	Greencastle
2010	6.20	Keyth Talley (USA)	Murfreesboro
2011	6.09	Lorenzo Pooler (USA)	Southern Pines
2012	6.08	Marvin Bracy (USA)	Gainesville
2013	6.16	John Landy (USA)	Brea
2014	6.11	Odean Skeen (JAM)	Lubbock
2015	6.09	Marvin Bracy (USA)	Gainesville
2016	6.17	Blake Smith (USA)	Cape Girardeau
2017	6.16	Jatavious Harris (USA)	Chicago
2018	6.17	Royal Burris (USA)	Charlotte
2019	6.26	William Henderson (USA)	State College
2020	6.22	Michael Gupton (USA)	Winston-Salem
2021	6.25	Udodi Onwuzurike (NGR)	Virginia Beach
2023	6.03+	Christian Coleman (USA)	New York City

=== Women ===
Year	Mark	Athlete	Place
1978	6.73	DeAndra Carney (USA)	Inglewood
1979	6.64	Lyudmila Storozhkova (USSR)	New York City
1980	6.77	Evelyn Ashford (USA)	New York City
1980	6.77	Brenda Morehead (USA)	New York City
1981	6.63	Alice Brown (USA)	Dallas
1982	6.55	Evelyn Ashford (USA)	New York City
1983	6.56	Evelyn Ashford (USA)	Los Angeles
1984	6.63	Alice Brown (USA)	New York City
1985	6.57	Alice Brown (USA)	New York City
1986	6.55	Jeanette Bolden (USA)	Los Angeles
1987	6.56	Gwen Torrence (USA)	Oklahoma City
1988	6.60	Gwen Torrence (USA)	East Rutherford
1989	6.58	Dawn Sowell (USA)	Baton Rouge
1990	6.58	Beatrice Utondu (Nigeria)	Monroe, North Carolina
1991	6.70	Carlette Guidry (USA)	Johnson City
1992	6.66	Gwen Torrence (USA)	Johnson City
1993	6.66	Michelle Freeman (Jamaica)	Johnson City
1994	6.70	Holli Hyche (USA)	Indianapolis
1995	6.60	Gwen Torrence (USA)	Johnson City
1996	6.68 A	Aleisha Latimer (USA)	Boulder, Colorado
1997	6.65	Savatheda Fynes (BAH)	Indianapolis
1998	6.68 A	Peta-Gaye Dowdie (JAM)	Colorado Springs
1999	6.71	Debbie Ferguson McKenzie (BAH)	Gainesville
2000	6.69	Julia O'Neal (USA)	Knoxville
2001	6.78	Monique Tubbs (USA)	Gainesville
2002	6.79	Tayna Lawrence (JAM)	Gainesville
2003	6.73	Elva Goulbourne (JAM)	Gainesville
2003	6.73	Angela Williams (USA)	Los Angeles
2003	6.73	Muna Lee (USA)	Gainesville
2004	6.70	Lauryn Williams (USA)	Gainesville
2005	6.74	Fana Ashby (TTO)	Gainesville
2005	6.74	Toyin Olupona (CAN)	Knoxville
2006	6.71	Kerron Stewart (JAM)	Gainesville
2007	6.71	Nolle Graham (JAM)	Gainesville
2008	6.80	Angela Williams (USA)	Gainesville
2008	6.80	Lakecia Ealey (USA)	Gainesville
2009	6.69	Tianna Bartoletta (USA)	Gainesville
2010	6.74	Sheri-Ann Brooks (JAM)	Gainesville
2011	6.81	Jura Levy (JAM)	Lubbock
2012	6.73	Shayla Mahan (USA)	Columbia
2013	6.73	Sheri-Ann Brooks (JAM)	Gainesville
2014	6.75	Staphanie Kalu (NGR)	Lubbock
2015	6.75	Tahesia Harrigan-Scott (IVB)	Gainesville
2016	6.84 A	Jerayah Davis (USA)	Laramie
2017	6.73 A	Jerayah Davis (USA)	Laramie
2018	6.73+	Tamari Davis (USA)	New York City
2019	6.75 A	Jerayah Davis (USA)	Laramie
2023	6.57+	Aleia Hobbs (USA)	New York City
2025	6.53+	Jacious Sears (USA)	New York City
