= Saluzzo Race Walking School =

International race-walking school in Saluzzo, Piedmont, Italy

- Athletic director: Maurizio Damilano
- Location: Saluzzo
- Colors: Royal blue and White
- Website: www.scuolacamminosaluzzo.it

The Saluzzo Race Walking School (Scuola del Cammino di Saluzzo) is an international race walking school in Saluzzo, Piedmont, Italy.

== History ==
The school was established in 2002 by the brothers Giorgio, Maurizio and Sandro Damilano. Former champion race walkers Maurizio and Giorgio trained for Olympic Games and other championships on the roads around Saluzzo. Sandro Damilano is an athletics coach and Director of the school.

It is an international training center for race walking, with accommodation for up to 12 people. It is also a centre for the diffusion of fitwalking.

== See also ==
- Power walking
- Fitwalking
