= Athletics at the 1995 Pan American Games – Women's 10,000 metres walk =

Women's 10 kilometres walk at the Pan American Games

The women's 10,000 metres walk event at the 1995 Pan American Games was held in Mar del Plata on 21 March. This was the last time that this distance was held at the Pan American Games; being later replaced by 20 kilometres.

In hot conditions, the Americans and Mexicans separated from the rest of the field. Martínez was the first to fall off the back. With 800 metres to go, Vaill was disqualified, 200 meters later, Rohl received her second card and she slowed, effectively handing the victory to Mendoza.

== Results ==
| Rank | Name | Nationality | Time | Notes |
|---|---|---|---|---|
| 1st place, gold medalist(s) | Graciela Mendoza | Mexico | 46:31.93 | |
| 2nd place, silver medalist(s) | Michelle Rohl | United States | 46:36.52 | |
| 3rd place, bronze medalist(s) | Francisca Martínez | Mexico | 47:44.78 | |
| 4 | Liliana Bermeo | Colombia | 48:29.02 | |
| 5 | Holly Gerke | Canada | 48:46.69 | |
| 6 | Miriam Ramón | Ecuador | 50:13.15 | |
| 7 | Giovanna Morejón | Bolivia | 51:04.38 | |
| 8 | Janice McCaffrey | Canada | 53:26.97 | |
| 9 | Lidia Cariego | Argentina | 55:32.56 | |
| | Teresa Vaill | United States | DQ | |
| | María Ambrosio | Guatemala | DQ | |
