= 1990 European Athletics Championships – Men's 50 kilometres walk =

Men's 50 kilometres walk at the European Athletics Championships

These are the official results of the Men's 50 km walk event at the 1990 European Championships in Split, Yugoslavia, held on 31 August 1990. There were a total number of fifteen athletes, who finished the race.

== Medalists ==
Gold	Andrey Perlov; Soviet Union
Silver	Bernd Gummelt; East Germany
Bronze	Hartwig Gauder; East Germany

== Abbreviations ==
- All times shown are in hours:minutes:seconds

DNS	did not start
NM	no mark
WR	world record
WL	world leading
AR	area record
NR	national record
PB	personal best
SB	season best

== Results ==
=== Final ===
31 August

Rank	Name	Nationality	Time	Notes
1st place, gold medalist(s)	Andrey Perlov	Soviet Union	3:54:36	
2nd place, silver medalist(s)	Bernd Gummelt	East Germany	3:56:33	
3rd place, bronze medalist(s)	Hartwig Gauder	East Germany	4:00:48	
4	Basilio Labrador	Spain	4:02:05	
5	José Marín	Spain	4:02:53	
6	Valentin Kononen	Finland	4:03:07	
7	Gianni Perricelli	Italy	4:03:36	
8	Sandro Bellucci	Italy	4:03:46	
9	Ronald Weigel	East Germany	4:04:36	
10	Martial Fesselier	France	4:05:18	
11	Les Morton	United Kingdom	4:05:28	
12	René Piller	France	4:05:39	
13	László Sátor	Hungary	4:09:46	
14	Zoltán Czukor	Hungary	4:16:40	
15	Volkmar Scholz	West Germany	4:18:52	
	Godfried De Jonckheere	Belgium	DNF	
	Sándor Urbanik	Hungary	DNF	
	Maurizio Damilano	Italy	DNF	
	Paul Blagg	United Kingdom	DNF	
	Jorge Llopart	Spain	DNF	
	Kari Ahonen	Finland	DNF	
	Jaroslav Makovec	Czechoslovakia	DNF	
	Alain Lemercier	France	DNF	
	Hubert Sonnek	Czechoslovakia	DNF	
	José Pinto	Portugal	DNF	
	Darrell Stone	United Kingdom	DNF	
	Stefan Johansson	Sweden	DNF	
	Bo Gustafsson	Sweden	DQ	
	Pavol Szikora	Czechoslovakia	DQ	
	Andrey Plotnikov	Soviet Union	DQ	
	Aleksandr Potashov	Soviet Union	DQ	

== Participation ==
According to an unofficial count, 31 athletes from 13 countries participated in the event.

- Belgium (1)
- Czechoslovakia (3)
- East Germany (3)
- Finland (2)
- France (3)
- Hungary (3)
- Italy (3)
- Portugal (1)
- Soviet Union (3)
- Spain (3)
- Sweden (2)
- United Kingdom (3)
- West Germany (1)

== See also ==
- 1988 Men's Olympic 50km Walk (Seoul)
- 1991 Men's World Championships 50km Walk (Tokyo)
- 1992 Men's Olympic 50km Walk (Barcelona)
- 1994 Men's European Championships 50km Walk (Helsinki)
