= Natalya Spiridonova (athlete, born 1963) =

Russian race walker

Personal information
- Nationality: Russian
- Born: 6 April 1963 (age 63)

Sport
- Country: Soviet Union
- Sport: Athletics
- Event: Racewalking

Achievements and titles
- Personal bests: Outdoor: 5 Kilometres Race Walk; 21:21 (1988); 10 Kilometres Race Walk; 43:13 (1990); 20 Kilometres Race Walk; 1:34:40 (1987)

Natalya Spiridonova (born 6 April 1963) is a Russian former athlete who specialized in racewalking. She competed in the 5000 metres race walk, 10 kilometres race walk and 20 kilometres race walk for the Soviet Union. She competed at the European Athletics Indoor Championships in 1988 European Athletics Indoor Championships, where she placed sixth in the women's 3000 metres walk event. She also took part in the 1986 Goodwill Games where she competed in the 10 kilometers walk event. She had her best ranking in the 5 km race walk in the 1988 World Year Ranking, where she was ranked third. In 1983, Natalya won gold at the 1983 Soviet Athletics Championships in the 10 Kilometres race walk.
