= Fusako Masuda =

Japanese racewalker

Fusako Masuda (Japanese: 増田 房子; born January 18, 1968) is a retired female race walker from Japan.

== Achievements ==
Year	Competition	Venue	Position	Notes
Representing Japan
1990	Asian Games	Beijing, China	3rd	10 km
1991	World Championships	Tokyo, Japan	37th	10 km
