= Andy Kaestner =

American racewalker

Personal information
- Full name: Andrew John Kaestner
- Nationality: American
- Born: August 25, 1964 (age 61)

Sport
- Sport: Athletics
- Event: Racewalking

Andrew John Kaestner (born August 25, 1964) is an American racewalker. He competed in the men's 50 kilometres walk at the 1988 Summer Olympics.
