= Ján Záhončík =

Slovak racewalker

Personal information
- Nationality: Slovak
- Born: 23 April 1965 (age 61) Skalica, Czechoslovakia

Sport
- Sport: Athletics
- Event: Racewalking

Ján Záhončík (born 23 April 1965) is a Slovak racewalker. He competed in the men's 20 kilometres walk at the 1992 Summer Olympics.
