= William Sawe =

Kenyan racewalker

Personal information
- Nationality: Kenyan
- Born: 5 September 1955 (age 70)

Sport
- Sport: Athletics
- Event: Racewalking

William Sawe (born 5 September 1955) is a Kenyan racewalker. He competed in the men's 50 kilometres walk at the 1988 Summer Olympics.
