= Guillaume LeBlanc =

Canadian race walker (born 1962)

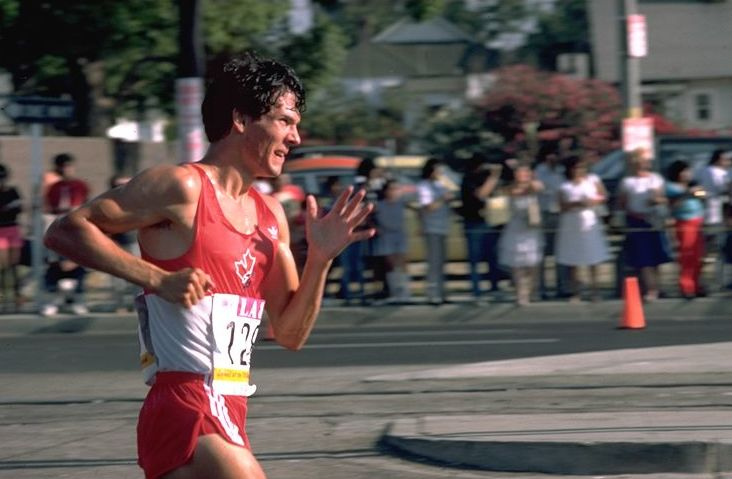
- LeBlanc in 1984

Personal information
- Born: 14 April 1962 (age 64) Sept-Îles, Quebec, Canada
- Height: 1.83 m (6 ft 0 in)
- Weight: 74 kg (163 lb)

Sport
- Country: Canada
- Sport: Athletics
- Event: Race walking
Medal record
Men's athletics
Representing Canada
Olympic Games
Silver medal – second place	1992 Barcelona	20 km Walk
Commonwealth Games
Gold medal – first place	1990 Auckland	30 km Walk
Bronze medal – third place	1982 Brisbane	30 km Walk
Universiade
Gold medal – first place	1983 Edmonton	20 km Walk
Bronze medal – third place	1985 Kobe	20 km Walk
- Updated on 11 January 2024

Guillaume LeBlanc (born 14 April 1962) is a Canadian retired race walker. He specialised in the 20 km event.

== Career ==
LeBlanc won the 20 km event at the 1989 Jeux de la Francophonie.

He competed for Canada at the 1992 Summer Olympics held in Barcelona, Spain, where he won the silver medal in the 20 kilometre walk event.

== Personal bests ==
- 20 km: 1:21:13 hrs – Saint-Leonard, Canada, 5 October 1986
- 50 km: 3:56:46 hrs – Mexico City, Mexico, 5 April 1992

== Achievements ==
Year	Competition	Venue	Position	Event	Notes
Representing Canada
1984	Olympic Games	Los Angeles, United States	4th	20 km	1:24:29
1984	Olympic Games	Los Angeles, United States	—	50 km	DNF
1984	Pan American Race Walking Cup	Bucaramanga, Colombia	2nd	20 km	1:27:06
1986	Pan American Race Walking Cup	Saint-Leonard, Canada	1st	20 km	1:21:13
1988	Olympic Games	Seoul, South Korea	10th	20 km	1:21:29
1988	Pan American Race Walking Cup	Mar del Plata, Argentina	3rd	20 km	1:27:08
1990	Pan American Race Walking Cup	Xalapa, Mexico	5th	20 km	1:23:26
1992	Olympic Games	Barcelona, Spain	2nd	20 km	1:22:25
1992	Olympic Games	Barcelona, Spain	—	50 km	DQ

== See also ==
- Canadian records in track and field
