= Eric Neisse =

French racewalker

Personal information
- Born: 27 November 1964 (age 61) Sorengo, Switzerland

Sport
- Sport: Track and field

Eric Neisse (born 27 November 1964) is a retired male race walker from France. He competed at the 1988 Summer Olympics.

== Achievements ==
Year	Competition	Venue	Position	Notes
Representing France
1988	Olympic Games	Seoul, South Korea	DSQ	50 km
