= Jaime Barroso (race walker) =

Spanish racewalker (born 1968)

Personal information
- Nationality: Spanish
- Born: 15 May 1968 (age 58) Barcelona, Spain

Sport
- Sport: Athletics
- Event: Racewalking
Medal record
Representing Spain
Summer Universiade
Silver medal – second place	1991 Sheffield	20 km walk

Jaime Jesús Barroso Ramírez (born 15 May 1968) is a Spanish racewalker. He competed in the men's 50 kilometres walk at the 1992 Summer Olympics and the 1996 Summer Olympics.
