= José Magalhães =

Portuguese racewalker

Personal information
- Nationality: Portuguese
- Born: 30 October 1954 (age 70)

Sport
- Sport: Athletics
- Event: Racewalking

José Magalhães (born 30 October 1954) is a Portuguese racewalker. He competed in the men's 50 kilometres walk at the 1992 Summer Olympics and the 1996 Summer Olympics.
