= Pascal Charrière =

Swiss racewalker

Personal information
- Nationality: Swiss
- Born: 14 November 1964 (age 60)

Sport
- Sport: Athletics
- Event: Racewalking

Pascal Charrière (born 14 November 1964) is a Swiss racewalker. He competed in the men's 50 kilometres walk at the 1992 Summer Olympics and the 1996 Summer Olympics.
