= Alain Lemercier =

French racewalker

Personal information
- Nationality: French
- Born: 1 November 1957 Flers, Orne

Sport
- Sport: race walking

Alain Lemercier (born 11 January 1957) is a retired male race walker from Flers, Orne, France, who competed in two consecutive Summer Olympics (1988 and 1992) during his career.

== Achievements ==
Year	Competition	Venue	Position	Event	Notes
Representing France
1986	European Championships	Stuttgart, West Germany	14th	50 km	3:59:11
1987	World Race Walking Cup	New York City, United States	17th	50 km	3:56:54
1987	World Championships	Rome, Italy|	23rd	50 km	4:09:53
1988	Olympic Games	Seoul, South Korea	16th	50 km	3:50:28
1990	European Championships	Split, Yugoslavia	—	50 km	DNF
1992	Olympic Games	Barcelona, Spain	16th	50 km	4:06:31
1994	European Championships	Helsinki, Finland	13th	50 km	3:54:44
