= Emmit King =

American sprinter (1959–2021)

Personal information
- Born: March 24, 1959 Bessemer, Alabama, U.S.
- Died: November 28, 2021 (aged 62) Bessemer, Alabama, U.S.

Sport
- Sport: Running
- Event: Sprints
- College team: Alabama Crimson Tide

Achievements and titles
- Personal best: 100 m: 10.04 s (Tampa 1988)
Medal record
Men's Athletics
Representing the United States
World Championships
Gold medal – first place	1983 Helsinki	4 × 100 m Relay
Bronze medal – third place	1983 Helsinki	100 metres
Pan American Games
Bronze medal – third place	1979 San Juan	100 metres

Emmit King (March 24, 1959 – November 28, 2021) was an American track and field sprinter, who twice was a member of the American Relay Team for the Summer Olympics (1984 and 1988) but he did not compete. He is best known for winning the bronze medal at the inaugural 1983 World Championships in the men's 100 metres. At the same championships, he was part of the team that won gold in the 4 × 100 m relay for the United States, and in doing so set a new world record of 37.86 s. He set his personal best (10.04) in the 100 metres on June 17, 1988, at the 1988 USA Outdoor Track and Field Championships in Tampa, Florida.

While at the University of Alabama, King became the 1983 NCAA 100 meters National Champion (10.15 seconds).

King was also twice national champion at the short sprint indoors: in 1984 at 60 yards and in 1988 at 55 metres.

In 1986, he became a member of Phi Beta Sigma fraternity through the Theta Delta chapter at the university. King was also a graduate of Hueytown High School in Alabama. In 1986 he married fellow Olympian Lillie Leatherwood.

King was killed in a shooting after a dispute on November 28, 2021, in Bessemer, Alabama. He was 62.

== Rankings ==
King was ranked among the best in the US and the world in the 100 m sprint event in the period 1979 to 1988, according to the votes of the experts of Track and Field News.

100 meters
Year	World rank	US rank
1979	9th	5th
1980	–	-
1981	–	-
1982	8th	7th
1983	4th	4th
1984	–	7th
1985	–	–
1986	–	–
1987	-	-
1988	–	8th
