= Vyacheslav Ivanenko =

Soviet race walker

Medal record

Men's athletics

Representing the Soviet Union

Olympic Games
Gold medal – first place	1988 Seoul	50 km walk

World Championships
Bronze medal – third place	1987 Rome	50 km walk

European Championships
Silver medal – second place	1986 Stuttgart	50 km walk

Vyacheslav Ivanovich Ivanenko (Russian: Вячеслав Иванович Иваненко; born 3 March 1961) is a retired race walker who represented the USSR.

== Biography ==
He won the gold medal over 50 kilometers at the 1988 Summer Olympics in Seoul with a personal best time of 3:38:29. He also won a silver at the 1986 European Championships and a bronze at the 1987 World Championships.

Born in Kemerovo, Ivanenko was awarded the title Honoured Master of Sports of the USSR in 1988 and the Order of Friendship of Peoples.

Ivanenko works in the Kemerovo department of the State Inspection For Traffic Security (GIBDD).

Since 2008, every autumn in Kemerovo on the Vyacheslav's initiative and the support of local authorities Ivanenko Race Walking Cup is taking place.

== International competitions ==
Year	Competition	Venue	Position	Notes
Representing Soviet Union
1987	World Race Walking Cup	New York City, United States	4th	50 km
