= François Lapointe (race walker) =

Canadian racewalker (born 1961)

Personal information
- Born: August 23, 1961 (age 65) Montreal, Quebec, Canada
- Height: 1.82 m (6 ft 0 in)
- Weight: 73 kg (161 lb)

Sport
- Country: Canada
- Sport: Athletics
- Event: Racewalking
- Updated on 25 July 2013

François Lapointe (born August 23, 1961) is a Canadian retired racewalker. He set his personal best in the men's 20 km race walk event (1:23:50) in 1987.

== Personal bests ==
- 20 km: 1:23:50 hrs – 1987
- 50 km: 3:48:15 hrs – (South Korea) Seoul, 30 September 1988

== Achievements ==
Year	Competition	Venue	Position	Event	Notes
Representing Canada
1982	Commonwealth Games	Brisbane, Australia	5th	30 km	2:17:02
1983	Universiade	Edmonton, Canada	7th	20 km	1:26:43
1983	World Championships	Helsinki, Finland	—	20 km	DNF
1983	World Championships	Helsinki, Finland	6th	50 km	3:53:57
1983	Pan American Games	Edmonton, Canada	–	50 km	DNF
1984	Olympic Games	Los Angeles, United States	11th	20 km	1:27:06
1984	Olympic Games	Los Angeles, United States	—	50 km	DSQ
1984	Pan American Race Walking Cup	Bucaramanga, Colombia	—	20 km	DSQ
1985	Universiade	Kobe, Japan	14th	20 km	1:34:59
1986	Goodwill Games	Moscow, Soviet Union	20th	20 km	1:29:11
1986	Commonwealth Games	Edinburgh, United Kingdom	—	30 km	DSQ
1986	Pan American Race Walking Cup	Saint Léonard, Canada	6th	50 km	4:20:35
1987	World Race Walking Cup	New York City, United States	12th	50 km	3:52:38
1987	Universiade	Zagreb, Yugoslavia	–	20 km	DNF
1987	World Championships	Rome, Italy	33rd	20 km	1:29.22
1987	World Championships	Rome, Italy	13th	50 km	3:56:11
1988	Olympic Games	Seoul, South Korea	14th	50 km	3:48:15
1990	Commonwealth Games	Auckland, New Zealand	4th	30 km	2:12:41
