= Giorgio Damilano =

Italian race walker

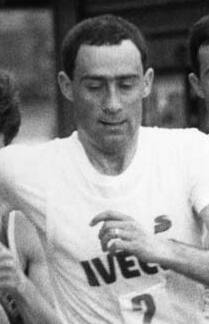
- Damilano in the 1970s

Personal information
- Born: 6 April 1957 (age 69) Scarnafigi, Italy
- Height: 1.82 m (5 ft 11 1/2 in)
- Weight: 70 kg (154 lb)

Sport
- Country: Italy
- Sport: Athletics
- Event: Race walking
- Club: Iveco Torino

Achievements and titles
- Personal best: 20 km race walk: 1:23:43 (1985)

Giorgio Damilano (born in Scarnafigi, 6 April 1957) is an Italian former race walker.

He is the twin brother of Italian race walker legend Maurizio Damilano and brother of the coach Sandro Damilano.

== Biography ==
He was 11th at the 1980 Summer Olympics held in Moscow. He also won a National championships in 20 km walk (1979).

In 1999, Maurizio Damilano and Giorgio Damilano founded Fit Walking.

Giorgio Damilano is one of the coaches of the Saluzzo Race Walking School, created by the town of Saluzzo in 2002, the school is also the center for the diffusion of Fit Walking and training center of international race walking.

== Achievements ==
Year	Competition	Venue	Position	Event	Performance	Notes
1980	Olympic Games	(Soviet Union) Moscow	11th	20 km walk	1:33:26	

== National titles ==
- 1 win in 20 km walk at the Italian Athletics Championships (1979)

== See also ==
- Saluzzo Race Walking School
- Fit Walking
