= Hartwig Gauder =

German athlete (1954–2020)

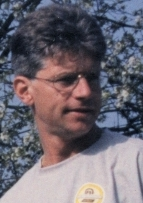
- Gauder in 1994

Personal information
- Born: 10 November 1954 Vaihingen an der Enz, West Germany
- Died: 22 April 2020 (aged 65)
Medal record
Men's athletics
Representing East Germany
Olympic Games
Gold medal – first place	1980 Moscow	50 km walk
Bronze medal – third place	1988 Seoul	50 km walk
World Championships
Gold medal – first place	1987 Rome	50 km walk
European Championships
Gold medal – first place	1986 Stuttgart	50 km walk
Bronze medal – third place	1990 Split	50 km walk
European Indoor Championships
Gold medal – first place	1981 Grenoble	5 km walk
World Race Walking Cup
Gold medal – first place	1985 St. John's	50 km walk
Silver medal – second place	1981 Valencia	50 km walk
Silver medal – second place	1987 New York	50 km walk
Representing Germany
World Championships
Bronze medal – third place	1991 Tokyo	50 km walk

Hartwig Gauder (10 November 1954 – 22 April 2020) was a German race walker who won a gold medal in the 50 kilometres walk at the 1980 Summer Olympics in Moscow.

Born in West Germany, his family moved to East Germany in 1960 when they inherited property at Ilmenau. Gauder thus competed for East Germany.

In 1996 Gauder started suffering from a virus infection of his heart. After living with an artificial heart for several months, he received a heart transplant. He subsequently took part in the New York Marathon several times. Being classified as a disabled participant due to his transplant, he was once disqualified for being too fast as there was a minimum time, which he underran.

His recovery from almost dying to returning into a normal life was covered in a documentary shown on German documentary channel Phoenix.

Gauder died while undergoing dialysis on 22 April 2020, aged 65. The cause of death was a heart attack complicated by kidney failure.

== International competitions ==
- Olympic Games
  - 1980 Moscow – gold
  - 1988 Seoul – bronze
- World Championships
  - 1987 Rome – gold
  - 1991 Tokyo – bronze
- European Championships
  - 1986 Stuttgart – gold
  - 1990 Split – bronze
