= Marco Evoniuk =

American racewalker

Personal information
- Full name: Marco Ray Evoniuk
- Born: September 30, 1957 (age 68) San Francisco, California
- Height: 1.78 m (5 ft 10 in)
- Weight: 65 kg (143 lb)

Sport
- Sport: Athletics
- Event: Racewalking
Medal record
Representing United States
Pan American Games
Bronze medal – third place	1979 San Juan	50km
- Updated on 25 July 2013

Marco Ray Evoniuk (born September 30, 1957, in San Francisco, California) is a retired male race walker from the United States, who represented his native country at three consecutive Olympic Games, starting in 1984. Evoniuk had qualified for the 1980 U.S. Olympic team but was unable to compete due to the 1980 Summer Olympics boycott. He did however receive one of 461 Congressional Gold Medals created especially for the spurned athletes.

== Personal bests ==
- 20 km: 1:25:23 hrs – (Denmark) Copenhagen, 12 May 1984
- 50 km: 3:56:55 hrs – (South Korea) Seoul, 30 September 1988

== Achievements ==
Year	Competition	Venue	Position	Event	Notes
Representing the United States
1979	World Race Walking Cup	Eschborn, West Germany	35th	50 km	4:12:37
1979	Pan American Games	San Juan, Puerto Rico	3rd	50 km	4:24:20
1981	World Race Walking Cup	Valencia, Spain	13th	50 km	4:07:44
1983	World Race Walking Cup	Bergen, Norway	—	50 km	DSQ
1983	World Championships	Helsinki, Finland	—	20 km	DNF
1983	World Championships	Helsinki, Finland	9th	50 km	3:56.57
1984	Olympic Games	Los Angeles, United States	7th	20 km	1:25:42
1984	Olympic Games	Los Angeles, United States	—	50 km	DNF
1985	World Race Walking Cup	St John's, Isle of Man	16th	50 km	4:11:03
1986	Pan American Race Walking Cup	Saint Léonard, Canada	2nd	50 km	4:05:56
1987	World Race Walking Cup	New York City, United States	—	20 km	DNF
1987	World Championships	Rome, Italy	17th	50 km	3:57.43
1988	Olympic Games	Seoul, South Korea	22nd	50 km	3:56:55
1988	Pan American Race Walking Cup	Mar del Plata, Argentina	—	50 km	DNF
1991	World Race Walking Cup	San Jose, United States	—	20 km	DNF
1992	Olympic Games	Barcelona, Spain	—	50 km	DNF
1995	World Race Walking Cup	Beijing, PR China	48th	50 km	4:11:31
1997	World Race Walking Cup	Poděbrady, Czech Republic	68th	50 km	4:17:24
