= Bernd Gummelt =

German racewalker

Medal record

Men's athletics

Representing East Germany

European Championships
Silver medal – second place	1990 Split	50 km walk

Bernd Gummelt (born 21 December 1963) is a German former racewalker. He represented the sports club ASK Vorwärts Potsdam.

Gummelt was born in Neuruppin. He is married to Beate Gummelt (née Anders).

== Achievements ==
Year	Competition	Venue	Position	Event	Notes
Representing East Germany
1990	Goodwill Games	Seattle, United States	3rd	20,000 m	1:23:29.61
1990	European Championships	Split, Yugoslavia	7th	20 km	1:24:33
1990	European Championships	Split, Yugoslavia	2nd	50 km	3:56:33
Representing Germany
1991	World Race Walking Cup	San Jose, United States	4th	50 km	3:51:12
