= Teresa Vaill =

American racewalker

Personal information
- Born: November 20, 1962 (age 63) Torrington, Connecticut
- Height: 1.62 m (5 ft 4 in)
- Weight: 48 kg (106 lb)

Sport
- Country: United States
- Sport: Athletics
- Event: Racewalking
- Updated on 27 July 2013

Teresa Vaill (born November 20, 1962) is a female racewalker from the United States. She was born in Torrington, Connecticut.

Vaill grew up on a dairy farm in Pine Plains, New York.

Vaill set her personal best in the women's 20 km race walk event (1:33:23) on April 1, 2001, at a meet in Manassas, Virginia. She remains an active competitor, winning numerous masters championships and placing in the USA National Championships (Open Division) as recently as 2018.

Her twin sister Lisa Vaill was also an international racewalker, and marathon runner.

== Personal bests ==
- 10 km: 45:02 min – Gothenburg, 7 August 1995
- 20 km: 1:33:23 hrs – Manassas, Virginia, 1 April 2001 – NR

== International competitions ==
Year	Competition	Venue	Position	Event	Notes
Representing the United States
1984	Pan American Race Walking Cup	Bucaramanga, Colombia	6th	10 km	51:29 min
1986	Pan American Race Walking Cup	Saint Leonard, Canada	4th	10 km	46:47 min
1987	World Race Walking Cup	New York City, United States	20th	10 km	46:50 min
1988	Pan American Race Walking Cup	Mar del Plata, Argentina	—	10 km	DSQ
1990	Pan American Race Walking Cup	Xalapa, Mexico	4th	10 km	47:18 min
1993	World Championships	Stuttgart, Germany	22nd	10 km	46:58 min
1995	Pan American Games	Mar del Plata, Argentina	–	10,000 m	DQ
1995	World Championships	Gothenburg, Sweden	22nd	10 km	45:02 min
2004	Olympic Games	Athens, Greece	43rd	20 km	1:38:47 hrs
2005	World Championships	Helsinki, Finland	—	20 km	DNF
2007	World Championships	Osaka, Japan	—	20 km	DQ
2009	World Championships	Berlin, Germany	—	20 km	DNF
