= Andrey Perlov =

Personal information
- Full name: Andrey Borisovich Perlov
- Born: 12 December 1961 (age 64) Novosibirsk, Soviet Union
- Height: 178 cm (5 ft 10 in)
- Weight: 65 kg (143 lb)
Medal record
Men's athletics
Representing the Unified Team
Olympic Games
Gold medal – first place	1992 Barcelona	50 km walk
Representing Soviet Union
World Championships
Silver medal – second place	1991 Tokyo	50 km walk
European Championships
Gold medal – first place	1990 Split	50 km walk
World Race Walking Cup
Silver medal – second place	1985 St John's	50 km walk
Silver medal – second place	1989 L'Hospitalet	50 km walk
Summer Universiade
Silver medal – second place	1985 Kobe	20 km walk

Andrey Borisovich Perlov (Russian: Андрей Борисович Перлов, born 12 December 1961 in Novosibirsk, Soviet Union) is a retired race walker who represented the USSR and later Russia.

== Education ==
In 1986, he graduated as a hydraulic engineer from the Novosibirsk Institute of Water Transport Engineers. Perlov started racewalking under coach V. I. Shvetsov in 1975. Since 1987, he was trained by V. B. Dorovskikh from Leningrad.

== Career ==
Perlov won the gold medal over 50 kilometres at the 1992 Summer Olympics in Barcelona. He also won the 1990 European Championships as well as silver medals at the 1991 World Championships and the IAAF World Race Walking Cup in 1985 and 1989.

At the 1991 World Championships, Perlov and his teammate Aleksandr Potashov attempted to cross the goal line simultaneously, resulting in a shared gold medal, but the officials declared Potashov the winner by 0.01 second.

Perlov's personal best time is 3:37:41 in the 50 kilometres, which places him 16th in the all-time performers list.

== Personal life ==
In March 2024, Perlov became a subject of an investigation into the embezzlement of funds from a football club which he managed as a director and was subsequently taken into custody. While in detention, Perlov was repeatedly offered to sign a contract to serve military duty in Ukraine, however, he rejected this offer, believing that the case itself was initiated illegally, and using such a method to avoid prosecution would have served as an admission of guilt for a crime he did not commit.

As the BBC notes, "Perlov has been detained for over six months, and his family says he is being pressured to fight in Ukraine, with the promise that the embezzlement charges would be frozen and possibly dropped after the war. Under the latest laws, prosecution and defense lawyers are now required to inform those charged with most crimes that they have the option to go to war instead of facing court".

== International competitions ==
Year	Competition	Venue	Position	Event	Notes
Representing the Soviet Union
1984	Friendship Games	Moscow, Soviet Union	1st	50 km	3:43:06
1985	World Race Walking Cup	St John's, Isle of Man	2nd	50 km	3:49:23
1987	World Race Walking Cup	New York City, United States	6th	50 km	3:45:09
1989	World Race Walking Cup	L'Hospitalet, Spain	2nd	50 km	3:44:12
1990	European Championships	Split, Yugoslavia	1st	50 km	3:54:36
1991	World Championships	Tokyo, Japan	2nd	50 km	3:53:09
Representing Unified Team
1992	Olympic Games	Barcelona, Spain	1st	50 km	3:50:13

Records
Preceded by Mikhail Shchennikov	Men's 20km Walk World Record Holder; 26 May 1990 – 16 September 1990	Succeeded by Pavol Blažek
Preceded by Ronald Weigel	Men's 50km Walk World Record Holder; 5 August 1989 – 21 May 2000	Succeeded by Valeriy Spitsyn
