= Herm Nelson =

American racewalker

Personal information
- Full name: Herman Gordon Nelson
- Nationality: American
- Born: September 20, 1961 (age 64)

Sport
- Sport: Athletics
- Event: Racewalking

Herman Gordon Nelson (born September 20, 1961) is an American racewalker. He competed in the men's 50 kilometres walk at the 1992 Summer Olympics and the 1996 Summer Olympics.
