= Aleksandr Potashov =

Retired race walker who represented USSR and Belarus

Aleksandr Potashov (Belarusian: Аляксандар Паташоў, Russian: Александр Поташёв; born 12 March 1962) is a retired race walker who represented the USSR and later Belarus. He won the gold medal over 50 kilometres at the 1991 World Championships. Potashov and his teammate Andrey Perlov attempted to cross the goal line simultaneously, resulting in a shared gold medal, but the officials declared Potashov the winner by 0.01 second.

Potashov finished fourth at the 1988 Summer Olympics in Seoul and was disqualified at the 1992 Olympics. His personal best time is 3:40:02, achieved in May 1990.

== International competitions ==
Year	Competition	Venue	Position	Event	Notes
Representing the Soviet Union
1987	World Race Walking Cup	New York City, United States	7th	50 km	3:46:28
1988	Olympic Games	Seoul, South Korea	4th	50 km	3:41:00
1989	World Race Walking Cup	L'Hospitalet, Spain	5th	50 km	3:48:02
1990	European Championships	Split, Yugoslavia	—	50 km	DSQ
1991	World Championships	Tokyo, Japan	1st	50 km	3:53:09
Representing Unified Team
1992	Olympic Games	Barcelona, Spain	—	50 km	DSQ
Representing Belarus
1994	European Championships	Helsinki, Finland	—	50 km	DSQ
