= Takehiro Sonohara =

Japanese racewalker

Personal information
- Born: November 9, 1962 (age 63) Nagano Prefecture, Japan

Sport
- Sport: Race walking

Takehiro Sonohara (Japanese: 園原 健弘; born November 9, 1962, in Nagano Prefecture) is a retired male race walker from Japan. He competed for his native country at the 1992 Summer Olympics.

== International competitions ==
Representing Japan
Year	Competition	Venue	Position	Event	Notes
1983	World Championships	Helsinki, Finland	46th	20 km	
1987	World Championships	Rome, Italy	21st	50 km	
1991	World Championships	Tokyo, Japan	23rd	50 km	
1992	Olympic Games	Barcelona, Spain	22nd	50 km	
