= Power walking =

Type of physical exercise

Power walking or speed walking is the act of walking with a speed at the upper end of the natural range for the walking gait, typically 7 to 9 km/h (4.3 to 5.5 mph). To qualify as power walking as opposed to jogging or running, at least one foot must be in contact with the ground at all times (see walking for a formal definition).

== History and technique ==
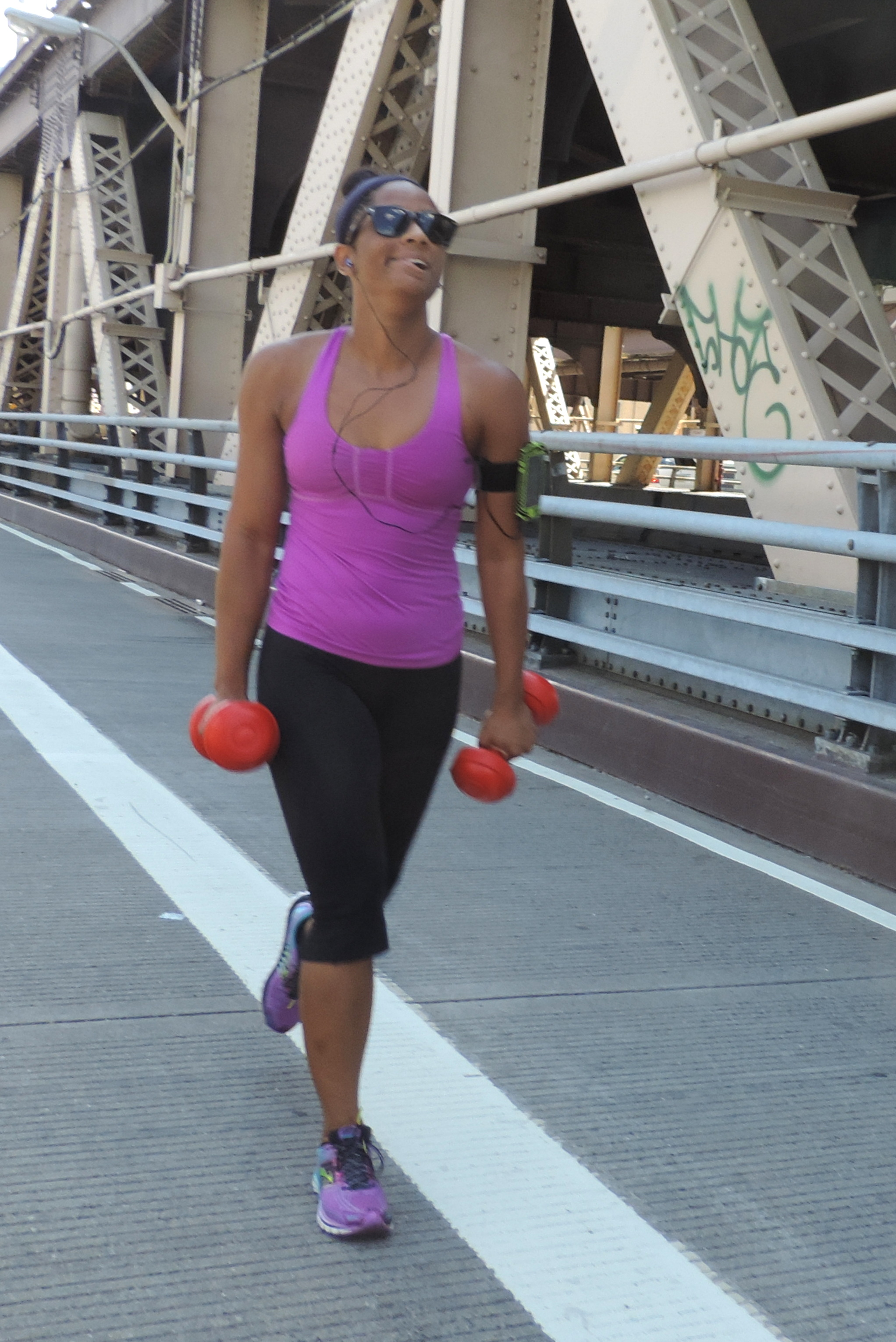
Some power walkers walk with weights, performing a farmers carry

In 1999, the Berlin Marathon included a Power Walking division.

Power walking is often confused with race walking.

Power walking techniques involve the following:

- The walker must walk straight
- The walker must walk doing an alternating movement of feet and arms
- The walker must walk with one foot in permanent contact with the ground
- The leading leg must be bent
- Each advancing foot strike must be heel to toe at all times
- The walker must walk not doing an exaggerated swivel to the hip
- The arms spread completely from the elbows and these move back

== Competitions and world records ==
Competitions are held for power walking competitions, with world records held in categories including 5 km, 10 km, half marathon, 30 km, marathon, and multiday distances.

== Health and fitness ==
A 2021 study, where post coronary angioplasty patients were introduced power walking based on their ejection fraction, VO_{2} max calculation, heart rate monitoring and pedometer counts. Those participants in power walking groups benefited significantly on quality of life and various physiological parameters. A Vanderbilt University Medical Center study published in the American Journal of Preventive Medicine in 2025 reported that 15 minutes of fast walking each day contributed to a range of health benefits.

== Sources ==
- Reeves, Steve. (1982) Power Walking, Bobbs-Merrill.
