= Simon Baker (race walker) =

Australian race walker (born 1958)

Personal information
- Born: 6 February 1958 (age 68) Melbourne, Victoria, Australia

Sport
- Sport: Race walking
Medal record
Representing Australia
Commonwealth Games
Gold medal – first place	1986 Edinburgh	30km

Simon Francis Baker (born 6 February 1958) is a retired male race walker from Australia, who represented his native country in four consecutive Olympic Games: 1984, 1988, 1992 and 1996.

== Achievements ==
Year	Competition	Venue	Position	Notes
Representing Australia
1983	World Race Walking Cup	Bergen, Norway	14th	20 km
1983	World Championships	Helsinki, Finland	29th	20 km
1984	Olympic Games	Los Angeles, United States	14th	20 km
1985	World Race Walking Cup	St John's, Isle of Man	12th	20 km
1986	Commonwealth Games	Edinburgh, Scotland	1st	30 km
1987	World Race Walking Cup	New York City, United States	11th	20 km
1987	World Championships	Rome, Italy	24th	20 km
1988	Olympic Games	Seoul, South Korea	11th	20 km
1988	Olympic Games	Seoul, South Korea	6th	50 km
1989	World Race Walking Cup	L'Hospitalet, Spain	1st	50 km
1990	Commonwealth Games	Auckland, New Zealand	7th	30 km
1991	World Race Walking Cup	San Jose, United States	2nd	50 km
1992	Olympic Games	Barcelona, Spain	19th	50 km
1993	World Race Walking Cup	Monterrey, Mexico	7th	50 km
1994	Commonwealth Games	Victoria, British Columbia, Canada	6th	30 km
1996	Olympic Games	Atlanta, United States	DNF	50 km
