= Tim Lewis (race walker) =

American racewalker (born 1962)

Personal information
- Full name: Timothy Charles Lewis
- Nationality: American
- Born: November 10, 1962 (age 63)

Sport
- Sport: Athletics
- Event: Racewalking
Medal record
Representing United States
Pan American Games
Silver medal – second place	1987 Indianapolis	20km walk

Timothy Charles Lewis (born November 10, 1962) is an American racewalker. He competed in the men's 20 kilometres walk at the 1988 Summer Olympics.
