= 2003 European Race Walking Cup =

- Organisers: EAA
- Edition: 5th
- Date: May 17–18
- Host city: Cheboksary, Chuvashia, Russia
- Events: 5
- Participation: 244 athletes from 27 nations

The 2003 European Race Walking Cup was held in Cheboksary, Russia, on May 17–18, 2003.

Complete results were published. Medal winners were published on the Athletics Weekly website,

== Medallists ==
Event	Gold		Silver		Bronze	
Men
20 km	Paquillo Fernández (ESP)	1:19:48	Alessandro Gandellini (ITA)	1:20:52	Vladimir Andreyev (RUS)	1:20:56
50 km	German Skurygin (RUS)	3:47:50	Aleksey Voyevodin (RUS)	3:48:43	Semen Lovkin (RUS)	3:51:36
10 km (Junior)	Andriy Yurin (UKR)	41:32	Aleksandr Prokhorov (RUS)	41:36	Mikalai Seradovich (BLR)	41:40
Team (Men)
20 km	Spain	13 pts	Russia	18 pts	Italy	26 pts
50 km	Russia	6 pts	Spain	16 pts	Portugal	54 pts
10 km Junior	Russia	11 pts	Spain	11 pts	Belarus	14 pts
Women
20 km	Yelena Nikolayeva (RUS)	1:26:22	Elisabetta Perrone (ITA)	1:27:58	María Vasco (ESP)	1:28:10
10 km Junior	Irina Petrova (RUS)	46:54	Vera Sokolova (RUS)	47:02	Sniazhana Yurchanka (BLR)	47:03
Team (Women)
20 km	Italy	27 pts	Spain	40 pts	Russia	44 pts
10 km Junior	Russia	3 pts	Belarus	7 pts	Germany	14 pts

== Results ==
=== Men's 20 km ===
Place	Athlete	Nation	Time
1st place, gold medalist(s)	Paquillo Fernández	Spain (ESP)	1:19:48
2nd place, silver medalist(s)	Alessandro Gandellini	Italy (ITA)	1:20:52
3rd place, bronze medalist(s)	Vladimir Andreyev	Russia (RUS)	1:20:56
4	João Vieira	Portugal (POR)	1:21:01
5	Ilya Markov	Russia (RUS)	1:21:29
6	David Márquez	Spain (ESP)	1:21:41
7	José David Domínguez	Spain (ESP)	1:21:53
8	Lorenzo Civallero	Italy (ITA)	1:22:01
9	Predrag Filipović	FR Yugoslavia (FR Yugoslavia)	1:22:25
10	Andrey Stadnichuk	Russia (RUS)	1:22:56
11	Alejandro Cambil	Spain (ESP)	1:23:04
12	Denis Langlois	France (FRA)	1:23:28
13	Benjamin Kuciński	Poland (POL)	1:23:44
14	Jiří Malysa	Czech Republic (CZE)	1:23:46
15	Sergei Charnov	Belarus (BLR)	1:23:53
16	Enrico Lang	Italy (ITA)	1:24:09
17	Nenad Filipović	FR Yugoslavia (FR Yugoslavia)	1:24:26
18	Trond Nymark	Norway (NOR)	1:24:37
19	Viktor Ginko	Belarus (BLR)	1:24:43
20	Konstantin Golubtsov	Russia (RUS)	1:24:46
21	Augusto Cardoso	Portugal (POR)	1:24:51
22	Costică Bălan	Romania (ROU)	1:24:56
23	Colin Griffin	Ireland (IRL)	1:25:20
24	Matej Tóth	Slovakia (SVK)	1:25:28
25	André Höhne	Germany (GER)	1:26:31
26	Andrei Talashka	Belarus (BLR)	1:27:24
27	Bengt Bengtsson	Sweden (SWE)	1:27:29
28	Martin Pupiš	Slovakia (SVK)	1:27:51
29	Peter Korčok	Slovakia (SVK)	1:28:16
30	Daniel Andrei	Romania (ROU)	1:28:31
31	Modris Liepiņš	Latvia (LAT)	1:28:39
32	Andrey Stepanchuk	Belarus (BLR)	1:28:47
33	Jani Lehtinen	Finland (FIN)	1:28:54
34	Fedosei Ciumacenco	Moldova (MDA)	1:29:14
35	Aivars Kadaks	Latvia (LAT)	1:30:21
36	Yuriys Konishevs	Latvia (LAT)	1:30:35
37	Grzegorz Sudoł	Poland (POL)	1:30:46
38	Linas Bubnelis	Lithuania (LTU)	1:31:03
39	Ivan Lutsyk	Ukraine (UKR)	1:31:08
40	Yohan Diniz	France (FRA)	1:31:45
41	Rafał Dys	Poland (POL)	1:32:29
42	Jan Albrecht	Germany (GER)	1:32:43
43	Daniel King	Great Britain (GBR)	1:33:08
44	Denis Franke	Germany (GER)	1:33:29
45	David King	Ireland (IRL)	1:33:57
46	Andriy Chelyubeyev	Ukraine (UKR)	1:34:44
47	John Baumert	France (FRA)	1:35:03
48	Dominic King	Great Britain (GBR)	1:35:16
49	Sergei Lazar	Ukraine (UKR)	1:37:06
50	Nicolas Perrier	Switzerland (SUI)	1:38:20
51	Bruno Grandjean	Switzerland (SUI)	1:38:38
52	Margus Luik	Estonia (EST)	1:38:51
53	Yann Banderet	Switzerland (SUI)	1:39:06
54	Pavel Iovskiy	Moldova (MDA)	1:41:33
55	Arturs Onuzans	Latvia (LAT)	1:42:02
56	Iuri Tatarciuc	Moldova (MDA)	1:43:33
57	Olivier Bianchi	Switzerland (SUI)	1:43:42
—	Marco Giungi	Italy (ITA)	DQ
—	Sigbjørn Sandberg	Norway (NOR)	DQ
—	Andy Drake	Great Britain (GBR)	DQ
—	Gintaras Andriuškevičius	Lithuania (LTU)	DNF
—	Anatolijus Launikonis	Lithuania (LTU)	DNF
—	Robert Korzeniowski	Poland (POL)	DNF
—	Robert Heffernan	Ireland (IRL)	DNF
—	Elefthérios Thanópoulos	Greece (GRE)	DNF
—	Franck Delree	France (FRA)	DNF
—	Erik Tysse	Norway (NOR)	DNF

==== Team (20 km Men) ====
Place	Country	Points
1st place, gold medalist(s)	Spain	13 pts
2nd place, silver medalist(s)	Russia	18 pts
3rd place, bronze medalist(s)	Italy	26 pts
4	Belarus	60 pts
5	Slovakia	81 pts
6	Poland	91 pts
7	France	99 pts
8	Latvia	102 pts
9	Germany	111 pts
10	Ukraine	134 pts
11	Moldova	144 pts
12	Switzerland	154 pts

=== Men's 50 km ===
Place	Athlete	Nation	Time
1st place, gold medalist(s)	German Skurygin	Russia (RUS)	3:47:50
2nd place, silver medalist(s)	Aleksey Voyevodin	Russia (RUS)	3:48:43
3rd place, bronze medalist(s)	Semen Lovkin	Russia (RUS)	3:51:36
4	Santiago Pérez	Spain (ESP)	3:52:57
5	Francisco Pinardo	Spain (ESP)	3:54:01
6	Stepan Yudin	Russia (RUS)	3:55:26
7	Mario Avellaneda	Spain (ESP)	3:56:21
8	Fredrik Svensson	Sweden (SWE)	3:56:53
9	Miloš Holuša	Czech Republic (CZE)	3:58:05
10	Pedro Martins	Portugal (POR)	3:58:07
11	János Tóth	Hungary (HUN)	3:59:24
12	Yuriy Burban	Ukraine (UKR)	4:00:51
13	Jeff Cassin	Ireland (IRL)	4:01:01
14	Marek Janek	Slovakia (SVK)	4:01:15
15	Diego Cafagna	Italy (ITA)	4:02:25
16	Spirídon Kastánis	Greece (GRE)	4:03:23
17	Birger Fält	Sweden (SWE)	4:04:07
18	Alessandro Mistretta	Italy (ITA)	4:04:18
19	Denis Trautmann	Germany (GER)	4:05:20
20	Jorge Costa	Portugal (POR)	4:05:51
21	Oleksiy Shelest	Ukraine (UKR)	4:08:02
22	Yeóryios Aryirópoulos	Greece (GRE)	4:08:08
23	Uģis Brūvelis	Latvia (LAT)	4:10:50
24	Luis Gil	Portugal (POR)	4:11:18
25	Zoltán Czukor	Hungary (HUN)	4:12:04
26	Daugvinas Zujus	Lithuania (LTU)	4:13:46
27	Rafał Fedaczyński	Poland (POL)	4:19:25
28	Oleksandr Romanenko	Ukraine (UKR)	4:20:00
29	Yeóryios Hristoúlis	Greece (GRE)	4:29:31
30	Gyula Dudás	Hungary (HUN)	4:33:38
—	Sandis Bisenieks	Latvia (LAT)	DQ
—	Jurijs Gjacs	Latvia (LAT)	DQ
—	David Boulanger	France (FRA)	DNF
—	Ivano Brugnetti	Italy (ITA)	DNF
—	Oleksiy Kazanin	Ukraine (UKR)	DNF
—	Mike Trautmann	Germany (GER)	DNF
—	Maik Berger	Germany (GER)	DNF
—	Mário Contreiras	Portugal (POR)	DNF
—	Sergeys Lapsa	Latvia (LAT)	DNF
—	Pascal Servanty	France (FRA)	DNF
—	José Antonio González	Spain (ESP)	DNF
—	Aleksandar Raković	FR Yugoslavia (FR Yugoslavia)	DNF
—	Alfio Corsaro	Italy (ITA)	DNF
—	Aleksandras Danulevičius	Lithuania (LTU)	DNF
—	Audrius Tamulevičius	Lithuania (LTU)	DNF
—	Aleksandr Andrushevskiy	Belarus (BLR)	DNS

==== Team (50 km Men) ====
Place	Country	Points
1st place, gold medalist(s)	Russia	6 pts
2nd place, silver medalist(s)	Spain	16 pts
3rd place, bronze medalist(s)	Portugal	54 pts
4	Ukraine	61 pts
5	Hungary	66 pts
6	Greece	67 pts

=== Men's 10 km (Junior) ===
Place	Athlete	Nation	Time
1st place, gold medalist(s)	Andriy Yurin	Ukraine (UKR)	41:32
2nd place, silver medalist(s)	Aleksandr Prokhorov	Russia (RUS)	41:36
3rd place, bronze medalist(s)	Mikalai Seradovich	Belarus (BLR)	41:40
4	Vladimir Parvatkin	Russia (RUS)	41:47
5	Francisco Arcilla	Spain (ESP)	41:50
6	Luis Corchete	Spain (ESP)	42:19
7	Daniele Paris	Italy (ITA)	42:33
8	Jiří Chaloupka	Czech Republic (CZE)	42:53
9	Rafał Augustyn	Poland (POL)	42:56
10	Benjamín Sánchez	Spain (ESP)	43:35
11	Aliaksei Babich	Belarus (BLR)	43:43
12	Michal Blažek	Slovakia (SVK)	43:47
13	Giorgio Rubimo	Italy (ITA)	43:58
14	Serhiy Budza	Ukraine (UKR)	44:04
15	Luke Finch	Great Britain (GBR)	44:05
16	Levente Kapéri	Hungary (HUN)	44:28
17	Aliaksandr Kazakou	Belarus (BLR)	44:33
18	Christoph Brauer	Germany (GER)	44:36
19	Ondrej Kocúr	Slovakia (SVK)	44:47
20	Carsten Schmidt	Germany (GER)	44:51
21	Michael Krause	Germany (GER)	44:52
22	Jean Michel Prevel	France (FRA)	44:55
23	Tadas Šuškevičius	Lithuania (LTU)	44:56
24	Jakub Jelonek	Poland (POL)	45:06
25	Oleksandr Lukyanchuk	Ukraine (UKR)	45:24
26	Ingus Yanevics	Latvia (LAT)	45:29
27	Vladimir Savanović	FR Yugoslavia (FR Yugoslavia)	45:34
28	Anatole Ibanez	Sweden (SWE)	45:36
29	Konstadínos Stefanópoulos	Greece (GRE)	45:46
30	Alessio Marnoni	Italy (ITA)	46:15
31	Martin Škarba	Slovakia (SVK)	46:42
32	Artis Ūdris	Latvia (LAT)	46:59
33	Patrik Hlavsa	Czech Republic (CZE)	47:00
34	Valeriys Rimss	Latvia (LAT)	47:04
35	Veysi Aslan	Turkey (TUR)	47:40
36	Bertrand Thierry	France (FRA)	47:54
37	Benoît Berchebru	France (FRA)	48:18
38	Vilius Mikelionis	Lithuania (LTU)	48:45
39	Haralambos Koutroulis	Greece (GRE)	49:28
40	Stanislav Herman	Czech Republic (CZE)	50:33
41	Szabolcs Glázer	Hungary (HUN)	51:26
42	Vladimir Chukavin	Moldova (MDA)	51:44
—	Sercan Saci	Turkey (TUR)	DQ
—	Neil Bates	Great Britain (GBR)	DQ
—	Vladimir Kanaykin	Russia (RUS)	DNF

==== Team (10 km Junior Men) ====
Place	Country	Points
1st place, gold medalist(s)	Russia	11 pts
2nd place, silver medalist(s)	Spain	11 pts
3rd place, bronze medalist(s)	Belarus	14 pts
4	Ukraine	15 pts
5	Italy	20 pts
6	Slovakia	31 pts
7	Poland	33 pts
8	Germany	38 pts
9	Czech Republic	41 pts
10	Hungary	57 pts
11	France	58 pts
12	Latvia	58 pts
13	Lithuania	61 pts
14	Greece	68 pts

=== Women's 20 km ===
Place	Athlete	Nation	Time
1st place, gold medalist(s)	Yelena Nikolayeva	Russia (RUS)	1:26:22
2nd place, silver medalist(s)	Elisabetta Perrone	Italy (ITA)	1:27:58
3rd place, bronze medalist(s)	María Vasco	Spain (ESP)	1:28:10
4	Natalya Fedoskina	Russia (RUS)	1:28:17
5	Susana Feitor	Portugal (POR)	1:29:08
6	Kjersti Tysse Plätzer	Norway (NOR)	1:29:36
7	Norica Cimpean	Romania (ROU)	1:30:27
8	Olive Loughnane	Ireland (IRL)	1:30:29
9	Melanie Seeger	Germany (GER)	1:30:41
10	Vira Zozulya	Ukraine (UKR)	1:30:54
11	Olga Kardapoltseva	Belarus (BLR)	1:31:05
12	Rossella Giordano	Italy (ITA)	1:31:10
13	Elisa Rigaudo	Italy (ITA)	1:31:18
14	Sabine Zimmer	Germany (GER)	1:31:32
15	Mari Cruz Díaz	Spain (ESP)	1:32:10
16	Valentyna Savchuk	Ukraine (UKR)	1:32:11
17	Athiná Papayiánni	Greece (GRE)	1:32:17
18	Sonata Milušauskaitė	Lithuania (LTU)	1:32:41
19	Vera Santos	Portugal (POR)	1:33:00
20	Kristina Saltanovič	Lithuania (LTU)	1:33:12
21	Fatiha Ouali	France (FRA)	1:33:25
22	Eva Pérez	Spain (ESP)	1:33:31
23	Barbora Dibelková	Czech Republic (CZE)	1:33:33
24	Hristína Kokótou	Greece (GRE)	1:33:38
25	Andrea Meloni	Germany (GER)	1:33:52
26	Beatriz Pascual	Spain (ESP)	1:34:11
27	Gisella Orsini	Italy (ITA)	1:34:27
28	Sylwia Korzniowska	Poland (POL)	1:34:43
29	Katsiaryna Labashova	Belarus (BLR)	1:35:53
30	Lyudmila Dolgopolova	Belarus (BLR)	1:35:57
31	Aggelikí Makrí	Greece (GRE)	1:35:59
32	Inês Henriques	Portugal (POR)	1:36:03
33	Monica Svensson	Sweden (SWE)	1:36:24
34	Christine Guinaudeau	France (FRA)	1:37:53
35	Daniela Cirlan	Romania (ROU)	1:38:06
36	Olena Miroshnychenko	Ukraine (UKR)	1:38:25
37	Maribel Gonçalves	Portugal (POR)	1:39:01
38	Tatyana Zuyeva	Belarus (BLR)	1:39:30
39	Antonina Petrova	Russia (RUS)	1:40:19
40	Veronica Budileanu	Romania (ROU)	1:40:51
41	Tatiana Denize-Boulanger	France (FRA)	1:41:00
42	Patricia Garnier	France (FRA)	1:41:06
43	Outi Sillanpää	Finland (FIN)	1:43:49
44	Marie Polli	Switzerland (SUI)	1:44:18
45	Laura Sukockytė	Lithuania (LTU)	1:44:38
46	Johanna Ellefsen Rostad	Norway (NOR)	1:44:41
47	Marja Penttinen	Finland (FIN)	1:49:07
48	Laura Polli	Switzerland (SUI)	1:49:34
—	Olga Lukyanchuk	Ukraine (UKR)	DQ
—	Kathrin Boyde	Germany (GER)	DQ
—	Gillian O'Sullivan	Ireland (IRL)	DQ
—	Ana Maria Groza	Romania (ROU)	DNF
—	Larisa Yemelyanova	Russia (RUS)	DNF
—	Kerly Lillemets	Estonia (EST)	DNF

==== Team (20 km Women) ====
Place	Country	Points
1st place, gold medalist(s)	Italy	27 pts
2nd place, silver medalist(s)	Spain	40 pts
3rd place, bronze medalist(s)	Russia	44 pts
4	Germany	48 pts
5	Portugal	56 pts
6	Ukraine	62 pts
7	Belarus	70 pts
8	Greece	72 pts
9	Romania	82 pts
10	Lithuania	83 pts
11	France	96 pts

=== Women's 10 km Junior ===
Place	Athlete	Nation	Time
1st place, gold medalist(s)	Irina Petrova	Russia (RUS)	46:54
2nd place, silver medalist(s)	Vera Sokolova	Russia (RUS)	47:02
3rd place, bronze medalist(s)	Sniazhana Yurchanka	Belarus (BLR)	47:03
4	Tatsiana Metleuskaya	Belarus (BLR)	48:11
5	Brigita Virbalytė	Lithuania (LTU)	48:30
6	Maja Landmann	Germany (GER)	48:51
7	Esther Serra	Spain (ESP)	49:14
8	Ulrike Sischka	Germany (GER)	49:26
9	Alla Bozhka	Belarus (BLR)	49:31
10	Anastasiya Kuznyetsova	Ukraine (UKR)	49:35
11	Lorena Luaces	Spain (ESP)	49:38
12	Ann Loughnane	Ireland (IRL)	49:44
13	Agnese Ragonesi	Italy (ITA)	49:50
14	Ana Cabecinha	Portugal (POR)	49:51
15	Katriona McMahow	Ireland (IRL)	50:53
16	Antigoni Drisbioti	Greece (GRE)	51:18
17	Nina Kovalchuk	Ukraine (UKR)	51:25
18	Martina Bertoglio	Italy (ITA)	52:01
19	Mandy Loriou	France (FRA)	52:09
20	Sophie Hales	Great Britain (GBR)	52:20
21	Katherine Stones	Great Britain (GBR)	52:44
22	Handan Çavdar	Turkey (TUR)	53:02
23	Fatma Ormeci	Turkey (TUR)	53:17
24	Lina Sidiskyte	Lithuania (LTU)	53:19
25	Irina Burlachenko	Moldova (MDA)	53:56
26	Tatevik Petrosyan	Armenia (ARM)	54:20
27	Cecilia Niveau	France (FRA)	54:33
28	Ksenia Ishcheykina	Russia (RUS)	54:38
29	Anaid Avagyan	Armenia (ARM)	55:02
30	Amélie Lheritier	France (FRA)	55:34
31	Dóra Nemere	Hungary (HUN)	56:19
32	Georgina Delgado	Spain (ESP)	56:34

==== Team (10 km Junior Women) ====
Place	Country	Points
1st place, gold medalist(s)	Russia	3 pts
2nd place, silver medalist(s)	Belarus	7 pts
3rd place, bronze medalist(s)	Germany	14 pts
4	Spain	18 pts
5	Ukraine	27 pts
6	Ireland	27 pts
7	Lithuania	29 pts
8	Italy	31 pts
9	United Kingdom	41 pts
10	Turkey	45 pts
11	France	46 pts
12	Armenia	56 pts

== Participation ==
The participation of 244 athletes (158 men/86 women) from 27 countries is reported.

- Armenia (2)
- Belarus (15)
- Czech Republic (6)
- Estonia (2)
- Finland (3)
- France (16)
- Germany (15)
- Greece (10)
- Hungary (6)
- Ireland (8)
- Italy (17)
- Latvia (11)
- Lithuania (13)
- Moldova (5)
- Norway (5)
- Poland (8)
- Portugal (11)
- Romania (6)
- Russia (18)
- Slovakia (7)
- Spain (18)
- Sweden (5)
- Switzerland (6)
- Turkey (4)
- Ukraine (16)
- United Kingdom (7)
- FR Yugoslavia (FR Yugoslavia) (4)
