= 2001 European Race Walking Cup =

- Organisers: EAA
- Edition: 4th
- Date: May 19
- Host city: Dudince, Banská Bystrica Region, Slovakia
- Events: 5
- Participation: 273 + 8 guests athletes from 30 nations

The fourth edition of the European Race Walking Cup took place in the Slovak city of Dudince on Saturday May 19, 2001.

Complete results were published. The junior events are documented on the World Junior Athletics History webpages. Medal winners were published on the Athletics Weekly website,

== Medallists ==
Event	Gold		Silver		Bronze	
Men
20 km	Viktor Burayev (RUS)	1:19:30	Yevgeniy Misyulya (BLR)	1:19:45	Andreas Erm (GER)	1:19:51
50 km	Jesús Angel García (ESP)	3:44:26	Nikolay Matyukhin (RUS)	3:45:48	Vladimir Potemin (RUS)	3:46:12
10 km (Junior)	Yevgeniy Demkov (RUS)	41:16	Sergey Lystsov (RUS)	41:18	Mikalai Seradovich (BLR)	41:30
Team (Men)
20 km	Russia	13 pts	Spain	34 pts	Italy	55 pts
50 km	Russia	11 pts	Spain	21 pts	France	24 pts
10 km Junior	Russia	3 pts	Belarus	8 pts	Poland	21 pts
Women
20 km	Olimpiada Ivanova (RUS)	1:26:48	Natalya Fedoskina (RUS)	1:26:50	Elisabetta Perrone (ITA)	1:27:09
10 km Junior	Tatyana Kozlova (RUS)	46:08	Marina Tikhonova (BLR)	46:31	Yekaterina Izmailova (RUS)	46:42
Team (Women)
20 km	Russia	8 pts	Italy	18 pts	Belarus	35 pts
10 km Junior	Russia	4 pts	Belarus	9 pts	Greece	12 pts

== Abbreviations ==
- All times shown are in hours:minutes:seconds

DNS	did not start
NM	no mark
WR	world record
WL	world leading
AR	area record
NR	national record
PB	personal best
SB	season best

== Men's results ==
=== 20 km walk ===
Rank	Athlete	Time	Note
1st place, gold medalist(s)	Viktor Burayev (RUS)	01:19:30	
2nd place, silver medalist(s)	Yevgeniy Misyulya (BLR)	01:19:45	
3rd place, bronze medalist(s)	Andreas Erm (GER)	01:19:51	
4	Paquillo Fernández (ESP)	01:20:02	
5	Vladimir Andreyev (RUS)	01:20:14	
6	Jiří Malysa (CZE)	01:20:21	
7	Denis Nizhegorodov (RUS)	01:20:42	
8	Aigars Fadejevs (LAT)	01:20:51	
9	Ivan Trotski (BLR)	01:21:43	
10	Juan Manuel Molina (ESP)	01:21:51	
11	Dmitriy Yesipchuk (RUS)	01:22:05	
12	Lorenzo Civallero (ITA)	01:22:10	
13	Silviu Casandra (ROM)	01:22:34	
14	Anthony Gillet (FRA)	01:22:44	
15	João Vieira (POR)	01:22:52	
16	Modris Liepins (LAT)	01:23:45	
17	Robert Heffernan (IRL)	01:23:57	
18	Daugvinas Zujus (LTU)	01:24:15	
19	Augusto Cardoso (POR)	01:24:22	
20	David Márquez (ESP)	01:24:43	
21	Vittorino Mucci (ITA)	01:24:50	
22	Alfio Corsaro (ITA)	01:24:58	
23	Roman Magdziarczyk (POL)	01:25:08	
24	Robert Valíček (SVK)	01:25:40	
25	Miloš Holuša (CZE)	01:25:50	
26	Bengt Bengtsson (SWE)	01:25:51	
27	Mikel Odriozola (ESP)	01:26:12	
28	Matej Spišiak (SVK)	01:26:15	
29	Eddy Riva (FRA)	01:26:20	
30	Spiridon Kastanis (GRE)	01:26:20	
31	Daniel Andrei (ROM)	01:26:28	
32	Aivars Kadakis (LAT)	01:27:13	
33	Jacob Sørensen (DEN)	01:27:17	
34	Sándor Urbanik (HUN)	01:27:21	
35	Stanisław Stosik (POL)	01:27:23	
36	Jani Lehtinen (FIN)	01:27:40	
37	Frank Delree (FRA)	01:28:05	
38	Milos Bátovský (SVK)	01:28:22	
39	Jan Albrecht (GER)	01:28:41	
40	Bogdan Mazilu (ROM)	01:28:46	
41	Erik Tysse (NOR)	01:28:55	
42	Kamil Kalka (POL)	01:29:04	
43	Fedosei Ciumacenco (MDA)	01:29:09	
44	Jamie Costin (IRL)	01:29:14	
45	Matt Hall (GBR)	01:30:08	
46	Leonid Mizernyuk (UKR)	01:30:15	
47	Antti Kempas (FIN)	01:30:40	
48	Pascal Servanty (FRA)	01:31:15	
49	Frank Werner (GER)	01:31:51	
50	Birger Fält (SWE)	01:32:05	
51	Themis Panayiotopolos (GRE)	01:32:08	
52	Peter Barto (SVK)	01:32:23	
53	Gábor Lengyel (HUN)	01:32:34	
54	David Snajdr (CZE)	01:33:51	
55	Vitaliy Stetsyshyn (UKR)	01:34:26	
56	Péter Domján (HUN)	01:34:47	
57	Anatolijus Launikonis (LTU)	01:35:08	
58	Eero Torpeinen (FIN)	01:36:23	
59	Abdulkadir Öz (TUR)	01:36:40	
60	Ivan Lutsyk (UKR)	01:36:52	
61	Nicolas Perrier (SUI)	01:37:50	
63	Sandris Bisenjeks (LAT)	01:40:58	
63	Margus Luik (EST)	01:44:28	
64	Ádám Farkas (HUN)	01:44:50	
65	Oleksandr Gal (UKR)	01:50:01	
—	Grzegorz Sudoł (POL)	DSQ	
—	Artur Meleshkevich (BLR)	DSQ	
—	Yeóryios Aryirópoulos (GRE)	DNF	
—	Claus Jørgensen (DEN)	DNF	
—	Gintaras Andriuškevičius (LTU)	DNF	
—	André Höhne (GER)	DNF	
—	Andrey Makarov (BLR)	DNF	
—	Alessandro Gandellini (ITA)	DNF	
—	Jesper Thomsen (DEN)	DNF	
—	Elefthérios Thanópoulos (GRE)	DNF	

==== Team (20 km Men) ====
Place	Country	Points
1st place, gold medalist(s)	Russia	13 pts
2nd place, silver medalist(s)	Spain	34 pts
3rd place, bronze medalist(s)	Italy	55 pts
4	Latvia	56 pts
5	France	80 pts
6	Romania	84 pts
7	Czech Republic	85 pts
8	Slovakia	90 pts
9	Germany	91 pts
10	Poland	100 pts
11	Finland	141 pts
12	Hungary	143 pts
13	Ukraine	161 pts

=== 50 km walk ===
Rank	Athlete	Time	Note
1st place, gold medalist(s)	Jesús Ángel García (ESP)	03:44:26	
2nd place, silver medalist(s)	Nikolay Matyukhin (RUS)	03:45:48	
3rd place, bronze medalist(s)	Vladimir Potemin (RUS)	03:46:12	
4	Santiago Pérez (ESP)	03:46:52	
5	Denis Langlois (FRA)	03:48:06	
6	Aleksey Voyevodin (RUS)	03:48:51	
7	Viktor Ginko (BLR)	03:50:59	
8	David Boulanger (FRA)	03:51:36	
9	Štefan Malík (SVK)	03:51:58	
10	Denis Trautmann (GER)	03:52:16	
11	René Piller (FRA)	03:52:18	
12	Yuriy Andronov (RUS)	03:52:57	
13	Francesco Galdenzi (ITA)	03:53:01	
14	Zoltán Czukor (HUN)	03:53:18	
15	Giovanni De Benedictis (ITA)	03:54:12	
16	Mario Avellaneda (ESP)	03:56:03	
17	Pedro Martins (POR)	03:56:25	
18	(Serbia and Montenegro) Aleksandar Raković (YUG)	03:56:56	
19	Fredrik Svensson (SWE)	03:57:31	
20	Alessandro Mistretta (ITA)	03:58:24	
21	Juan Porras (ESP)	04:03:38	
22	Mike Trautmann (GER)	04:04:06	
23	Jorge Costa (POR)	04:04:54	
24	František Kmenta (CZE)	04:06:56	
25	Michael Lohse (GER)	04:07:15	
26	Oleksiy Shelest (UKR)	04:08:36	
27	Ugis Bruvelis (LAT)	04:09:58	
28	Aleksey Novikov (BLR)	04:11:48	
29	Denis Franke (GER)	04:13:25	
30	Luis Gil (POR)	04:15:55	
31	Attila Fülöp (HUN)	04:17:51	
32	Martin Pupiš (SVK)	04:19:53	
33	Steven Hollier (GBR)	04:20:50	
34	Virgilio Soares (POR)	04:22:08	
35	Sergiy Lazar (UKR)	04:23:36	
36	Jiří Sorm (CZE)	04:24:46	
37	Christian Cheeseman (GBR)	04:24:48	
38	Róbert Tupak (HUN)	04:25:30	
39	Juris Jacs (LAT)	04:29:09	
40	Peter Seben (SVK)	04:33:51	
DISQUALIFIED (DSQ)
—	Marcel van Gemert (NED)	DSQ	

==== Team (50 km Men) ====
Place	Country	Points
1st place, gold medalist(s)	Russia	11 pts
2nd place, silver medalist(s)	Spain	21 pts
3rd place, bronze medalist(s)	France	24 pts
4	Italy	48 pts
5	Germany	57 pts
6	Portugal	70 pts
7	Slovakia	81 pts
8	Hungary	83 pts

=== Men's 10 km (Junior) ===
Place	Athlete	Time	Note
1st place, gold medalist(s)	Yevgeniy Demkov (RUS)	41:16	
2nd place, silver medalist(s)	Sergey Lystsov (RUS)	41:18	
3rd place, bronze medalist(s)	Mikalai Seradovich (BLR)	41:30	
4	Aleksandr Strokov (RUS)	41:53	
5	Andrei Talashka (BLR)	42:12	
6	Dmitriy Malinovskiy (BLR)	42:23	
7	Benjamin Kuciński (POL)	42:41	
8	Paul Gassebner (ITA)	42:47	
9	Radek Pařízek (CZE)	43:10	
—^{†}	Oleksey Medentsov (UKR)	43:10	
10	Theodoros Koupidis (GRE)	43:15	
11	Sergiy Ivakhin (UKR)	43:25	
12	Jesús Tomero (ESP)	43:25	
13	Alexandros Spiliopoulos (GRE)	43:26	
14	Rafał Dyś (POL)	43:33	
15	(Serbia and Montenegro) Marko Lepojević (YUG)	43:51	
16	Colin Griffin (IRL)	43:52	
17	Michal Blažek (SVK)	43:53	
18	Daniele Paris (ITA)	44:00	
19	Oleksiy Kazanin (UKR)	44:06	
20	David Sisa (HUN)	44:13	
21	Norbert Polonkai (HUN)	44:16	
22	Codrut Filea (ROU)	44:18	
23	Alexandre Jacques (ESP)	44:26	
24	Benoît Beclin (FRA)	44:34	
25	Andreas Franke (GER)	44:40	
26	Slawomir Majchrzycki (POL)	45:03	
27	Francisco Arcilla (ESP)	45:06	
28	Levente Kapéri (HUN)	45:27	
29	Lloyd Finch (GBR)	45:35	
30	Jiří Chaloupka (CZE)	45:36	
31	Loïc Garcia (FRA)	45:39	
—^{†}	Anatoliy Shaidyankov (BLR)	45:44	
32	Iustin Tatarau (ROU)	45:53	
33	Recep Çelik (TUR)	46:03	
34	Saulius Taraškevičius (LTU)	46:10	
35	Armandas Brazaitis (LTU)	46:13	
36	Andrew Parker (GBR)	46:17	
37	Vilius Mikelionis (LTU)	46:23	
—^{†}	Ignas Brasevičius (LTU)	46:23	
38	Christoph Brauer (GER)	46:30	
39	Matej Tóth (SVK)	47:18	
40	Bruno Grandjean (SUI)	47:31	
—^{†}	Julien Ferlisi (FRA)	47:42	
41	Ondrej Kocúr (SVK)	48:08	
42	Pierre Raye (FRA)	48:24	
43	Cameron Smith (GBR)	50:33	
—	Migurel Craciun (ROU)	DSQ	
—	Andriy Yurin (UKR)	DSQ	
—	André Katzinski (GER)	DSQ	
—	Paraskevai Vandoros (GRE)	DSQ	

^{†}: Extra athlete (illegible for Team and individual results)

==== Team (10 km Junior Men) ====
Place	Country	Points
1st place, gold medalist(s)	Russia	3 pts
2nd place, silver medalist(s)	Belarus	8 pts
3rd place, bronze medalist(s)	Poland	21 pts
4	Greece	23 pts
5	Italy	26 pts
6	Ukraine	30 pts
7	Spain	35 pts
8	Czech Republic	39 pts
9	Hungary	41 pts
10	Romania	54 pts
11	France	55 pts
12	Slovakia	56 pts
13	Germany	63 pts
14	United Kingdom	65 pts
15	Lithuania	69 pts

== Women's results ==
=== 20 km walk ===
Rank	Athlete	Time	Note
1st place, gold medalist(s)	Olimpiada Ivanova (RUS)	01:26:48	
2nd place, silver medalist(s)	Natalya Fedoskina (RUS)	01:26:50	
3rd place, bronze medalist(s)	Elisabetta Perrone (ITA)	01:27:09	
4	Erica Alfridi (ITA)	01:27:29	
5	Yelena Nikolayeva (RUS)	01:28:20	
6	Norica Cimpean (ROM)	01:29:25	
7	María Vasco (ESP)	01:30:11	
8	Valentina Tsybulskaya (BLR)	01:30:37	
9	Gillian O'Sullivan (IRL)	01:31:13	
10	Natalya Misyulya (BLR)	01:31:21	
11	Annarita Sidoti (ITA)	01:31:43	
12	Valentyna Savchuk (UKR)	01:31:48	
13	Jolanta Dukure (LAT)	01:32:11	
14	Elena Isar (ROM)	01:32:36	
15	Melanie Seeger (GER)	01:32:57	
16	Fatiha Ouali (FRA)	01:33:04	
17	Elena Ginko (BLR)	01:33:21	
18	Teresa Linares (ESP)	01:33:27	
19	Olga Lukyanchuk (UKR)	01:33:57	
20	Vira Zozulya (UKR)	01:34:24	
21	Tatyana Sibileva (RUS)	01:34:38	
22	Nevena Mineva (BUL)	01:35:30	
23	Rocío Florido (ESP)	01:35:31	
24	Gisella Orsini (ITA)	01:35:46	
25	Ines Henriques (POR)	01:36:08	
26	Olive Loughnane (IRL)	01:36:50	
27	Isilda Gonçalves (POR)	01:36:54	
28	Tatiana Boulanger (FRA)	01:36:59	
29	Sonata Milušauskaitė (LTU)	01:37:31	
30	Eva Pérez (ESP)	01:37:47	
31	Mária Urbanik (HUN)	01:37:48	
32	Sofia Avoila (POR)	01:37:58	
33	Agnieszka Olesz (POL)	01:37:58	
34	Andrea Meloni (GER)	01:38:03	
35	Tuna Muinonen (FIN)	01:38:32	
36	Sylwia Korzeniowska (POL)	01:39:02	
37	Veronica Budilleanu (ROM)	01:39:45	
38	Heidi Lindewall (FIN)	01:39:54	
39	Anne Haaland (NOR)	01:40:16	
40	Marie Polli (SUI)	01:40:23	
41	Outi Sillänpää (FIN)	01:40:24	
42	Mária Gáliková (SVK)	01:40:26	
43	Monica Svensson (SWE)	01:41:00	
44	Ildikó Ilyés (HUN)	01:41:10	
45	Roseline Chapillon (FRA)	01:42:19	
46	Yeliz Ay (TUR)	01:42:49	
47	Zuzana Blazeková (SVK)	01:43:01	
48	Jelena Launikonyte (LTU)	01:47:06	
49	Anita Benkö (HUN)	01:47:42	
50	Orsolya Gruber (HUN)	01:49:43	
51	Elin Loftesnes (NOR)	01:55:04	
52	Viera Toporek (AUT)	01:55:36	
53	Maria Lutmaa (EST)	02:01:41	
54	Mária Vargaestoková (SVK)	02:04:21	
55	Kerly Lillemets (EST)	02:04:43	
DISQUALIFIED (DSQ)
—	Susana Feitor (POR)	DSQ	
—	Daniela Cirlan (ROM)	DSQ	
—	Lyudmyla Yegorova (UKR)	DSQ	
DID NOT FINISH (DNF)
—	Kristina Saltanovič (LTU)	DNF	
—	Henrieta Rusnáková (SVK)	DNF	
—	Joanna Baj (POL)	DNF	
—	Kjersti Plätzer (NOR)	DNF	
—	Hristína Kokótou (GRE)	DNF	
—	Ryta Turava (BLR)	DNF	
—	Stephanie Panzig (GER)	DNF	
—	Hanne Liland (NOR)	DNF	
—	Kathrin Born-Boyde (GER)	DNF	
—	Nora Leksir (FRA)	DNF	

==== Team (20 km Women) ====
Place	Country	Points
1st place, gold medalist(s)	Russia	8 pts
2nd place, silver medalist(s)	Italy	18 pts
3rd place, bronze medalist(s)	Belarus	35 pts
4	Spain	48 pts
5	Ukraine	51 pts
6	Romania	57 pts
7	Portugal	84 pts
8	France	89 pts
9	Finland	114 pts
10	Hungary	124 pts
11	Slovakia	143 pts

=== Women's 10 km Junior ===
Place	Athlete	Time	Note
1st place, gold medalist(s)	Tatyana Kozlova (RUS)	46:08	
2nd place, silver medalist(s)	Marina Tikhonova (BLR)	46:31	
3rd place, bronze medalist(s)	Yekaterina Izmailova (RUS)	46:42	
4	Athanassia Tzoumeleka (GRE)	46:43	
5	Beatriz Pascual (ESP)	47:23	
6	Edina Füsti (HUN)	47:30	
7	Katsiaryna Labashova (BLR)	47:38	
8	María Hatzipanayiotídou (GRE)	47:40	
9	Zuzana Maliková (SVK)	47:45	
10	Sniazhana Yurchanka (BLR)	47:58	
11	(Serbia and Montenegro) Ankica Barzut (YUG)	48:07	
12	Irina Korotkova (RUS)	48:22	
13	Ulrike Sischka (GER)	48:42	
14	Mélissa Rodriguez (FRA)	48:43	
15	Anna Szumny (POL)	48:57	
16	Lorena Luaces (ESP)	49:20	
17	Carla Monteiro (POR)	49:22	
18	Alina Olaru (ROU)	49:38	
19	Barbora Dibelková (CZE)	49:57	
20	Raquel Carvalho (POR)	50:12	
21	Alice Robin (FRA)	50:31	
—^{†}	Julie Goubault (FRA)	50:54	
22	Iraxte Pérez (ESP)	51:00	
23	Erini Karagianni (GRE)	51:03	
24	Laura Polli (SUI)	51:16	
—^{†}	Tatyana Zuyeva (BLR)	51:20	
25	Johanna Ellefsen Rostad (NOR)	51:25	
26	Dorothée Brun (FRA)	51:26	
27	Maria Baj (POL)	51:38	
28	Teodora Pusta (ROU)	51:49	
29	Gabriella Papp (HUN)	51:50	
30	Zinaida Onoprienko (UKR)	51:52	
—^{†}	Anastasiya Kuznyetsova (UKR)	52:08	
31	Oana Maxim (ROU)	52:09	
32	Violetta Spychalska (POL)	52:52	
33	Virág Erdös (HUN)	53:01	
34	Kristina Judkina (UKR)	53:02	
35	Mária Novotná (SVK)	53:18	
36	Alice Klabuhn (GER)	53:39	
—^{†}	Dóra Nemere (HUN)	53:42	
37	Veronika Daňová (SVK)	53:45	
38	Dovilė Juozaitytė (LTU)	57:24	
39	Katy-Marin Tiitmaa (EST)	59:11	
40	Annika Sillat (EST)	1:01:41	
—	Corinna Hensel (GER)	DNF	
—	Olena Syrovatko (UKR)	DNF	

^{†}: Extra athlete (illegible for Team and individual results)

==== Team (10 km Junior Women) ====
Place	Country	Points
1st place, gold medalist(s)	Russia	4 pts
2nd place, silver medalist(s)	Belarus	9 pts
3rd place, bronze medalist(s)	Greece	12 pts
4	Spain	21 pts
5	Hungary	35 pts
6	France	35 pts
7	Portugal	37 pts
8	Poland	42 pts
9	Slovakia	44 pts
10	Romania	46 pts
11	Germany	49 pts
12	Ukraine	64 pts
13	Estonia	79 pts

== Participation ==
The participation of 273 athletes ( men/ women) + 8 guests (4 men/4 women) in the Junior events from 30 countries is reported.

- Austria (1)
- Belarus (16+2)
- Bulgaria (1)
- Czech Republic (8)
- Denmark (3)
- Estonia (5)
- Finland (6)
- France (18+2)
- Germany (18)
- Greece (11)
- Hungary (17+1)
- Ireland (5)
- Italy (13)
- Latvia (7)
- Lithuania (10+1)
- Moldova (1)
- Netherlands (1)
- Norway (6)
- Poland (13)
- Portugal (12)
- Romania (12)
- Russia (18)
- Slovakia (17)
- Spain (18)
- Sweden (4)
- Switzerland (4)
- Turkey (3)
- Ukraine (16+2)
- United Kingdom (6)
- (Serbia and Montenegro) Yugoslavia (3)

== See also ==
- 2001 Race Walking Year Ranking
