= 1997 World Championships in Athletics – Men's 20 kilometres walk =

These are the official results of the Men's 20 km Walk event at the 1997 World Championships held on Saturday 2 August 1997 in Athens, Greece. There were a total number of 49 participating athletes.

== Medalists ==
Gold	Daniel García; Mexico (MEX)
Silver	Mikhail Shchennikov; Russia (RUS)
Bronze	Mikhail Khmelnitskiy; Belarus (BLR)

== Abbreviations ==
- All times shown are in hours:minutes:seconds

DNS	did not start
NM	no mark
WR	world record
AR	area record
NR	national record
PB	personal best
SB	season best

== Records ==
Standing records prior to the 1997 World Athletics Championships
Event Record	Narinder Singh	1:24:50	19 April 1997	Kuala Lumpur, Malaysia
World Record	Bu Lingtang (CHN)	1:18.04	April 7, 1994	Beijing, PR China
Event Record	Maurizio Damilano (ITA)	1:19.37	August 24, 1991	Tokyo, Japan

== Final ranking ==
Rank	Athlete	Time	Note
1st place, gold medalist(s)	Daniel García (MEX)	1:21:43	
2nd place, silver medalist(s)	Mikhail Shchennikov (RUS)	1:21:53	
3rd place, bronze medalist(s)	Mikhail Khmelnitskiy (BLR)	1:22:01	
4	Yu Guohui (CHN)	1:22:57	
5	Li Zewen (CHN)	1:23:03	
6	Yevgeniy Misyulya (BLR)	1:23:10	
7	Michele Didoni (ITA)	1:23:14	
8	Giovanni De Benedictis (ITA)	1:23:33	
9	Hatem Ghoula (TUN)	1:23:49	
10	Daniel Plaza (ESP)	1:23:53	
11	Robert Ihly (GER)	1:24:12	
12	Alessandro Gandellini (ITA)	1:24:24	
13	Igor Kollár (SVK)	1:24:37	
14	Jefferson Pérez (ECU)	1:24:46	
15	Jacek Muller (POL)	1:24:47	
16	Joel Sánchez (MEX)	1:24:48	
17	Denis Langlois (FRA)	1:25:27	
18	Omar Zepeda (MEX)	1:25:38	
19	Nicholas A'Hern (AUS)	1:25:46	
20	Artur Meliashkevich (BLR)	1:25:47	
21	Sérgio Galdino (BRA)	1:25:50	
22	Roberto Oscal (GUA)	1:26:20	
23	Marco Giungi (ITA)	1:26:23	
24	Modris Liepins (LAT)	1:26:24	
25	Jean-Olivier Brosseau (FRA)	1:26:39	
26	Sándor Urbanik (HUN)	1:26:50	
27	Gyula Dudás (HUN)	1:27:17	
28	José Urbano (POR)	1:27:25	
29	Milos Holusa (CZE)	1:27:27	
30	Fedosei Ciumacenco (MDA)	1:28:51	
31	Luis Fernando García (GUA)	1:28:51	
32	Dion Russell (AUS)	1:30:49	
33	Róbert Valíček (SVK)	1:31:28	
34	Curt Clausen (USA)	1:32:05	
35	Valeriy Borisov (KAZ)	1:32:32	
36	Dimitrios Orfanopoulos (GRE)	1:32:37	
37	Fernando Vázquez (ESP)	1:32:44	
38	Chris Britz (RSA)	1:34:02	
DID NOT FINISH (DNF)
—	Aigars Fadejevs (LAT)	DNF	
—	Scott Nelson (NZL)	DNF	
—	Claus Jørgensen (DEN)	DNF	
—	Thierry Toutain (FRA)	DNF	
—	Vladimir Andreyev (RUS)	DNF	
DISQUALIFIED (DSQ)
—	Jan Staaf (SWE)	DSQ	
—	Andreas Erm (GER)	DSQ	
—	Julio René Martínez (GUA)	DSQ	
—	Ilya Markov (RUS)	DSQ	
—	Rami Ali Deeb (PLE)	DSQ	
—	Narinder Singh Al Harbans Singh (MAS)	DSQ	

== See also ==
- 1994 Men's European Championships 20km Walk (Helsinki)
- 1996 Men's Olympic 20km Walk (Atlanta)
- 1997 Race Walking Year Ranking
- 1998 Men's European Championships 20km Walk (Budapest)
