= 1998 European Athletics Championships – Men's 20 kilometres walk =

33 athletes participated

Men's 20 kilometres walk at the European Athletics Championships

These are the official results of the Men's 20 km walk event at the 1998 European Championships in Budapest, Hungary. There were a total number of 33 participating athletes, with the race held on 18 August 1998.

== Medalists ==
Gold	Ilya Markov; Russia (RUS)
Silver	Aigars Fadejevs; Latvia (LAT)
Bronze	Paquillo Fernández; Spain (ESP)

== Abbreviations ==
- All times shown are in hours:minutes:seconds

DNS	did not start
NM	no mark
WR	world record
AR	area record
NR	national record
PB	personal best
SB	season best

== Records ==
Standing records prior to the 1998 European Athletics Championships
World Record	Bu Lingtang (CHN)	1:18:04	April 7, 1994	Beijing, PR China
Event Record	Mikhail Shchennikov (RUS)	1:18:45	August 8, 1994	Helsinki, Finland

== Final ranking ==
Rank	Athlete	Time	Note
1st place, gold medalist(s)	Ilya Markov (RUS)	1:21:10	
2nd place, silver medalist(s)	Aigars Fadejevs (LAT)	1:21:25	
3rd place, bronze medalist(s)	Paquillo Fernández (ESP)	1:21:39	
4	Andreas Erm (GER)	1:21.53	
5	Sándor Urbanik (HUN)	1:22.12	
6	Ivan Trotski (BLR)	1:22.46	
7	Denis Langlois (FRA)	1:23.02	
8	Yevgeniy Shmalyuk (RUS)	1:23.32	
9	Valentí Massana (ESP)	1:23.36	
10	Giovanni De Benedictis (ITA)	1:25.06	SB
11	Michele Didoni (ITA)	1:25.54	
12	Alessandro Gandellini (ITA)	1:25.57	
13	José Urbano (POR)	1:26.04	
14	Claus Jørgensen (DEN)	1:26.28	
15	Igor Kollár (SVK)	1:26.43	
16	Anthony Gillet (FRA)	1:27.07	
17	Róbert Valíček (SVK)	1:27.25	
18	Gyula Dudás (HUN)	1:27.51	
19	Fedosei Ciumacenco (MDA)	1:27.56	
20	João Vieira (POR)	1:29.38	
21	Jiří Malysa (CZE)	1:30.16	
22	Spiridon Kastanis (GRE)	1:30.19	
23	André Höhne (GER)	1:32.28	
24	Erik Kalina (SVK)	1:35.55	
25	Michael Casey (IRL)	1:38.58	
DISQUALIFIED (DSQ)
—	Andrey Makarov (BLR)	DSQ	
—	Daniel Plaza (ESP)	DSQ	
—	Birger Fält (SWE)	DSQ	
—	Artur Meleshkevich (BLR)	DSQ	
DID NOT FINISH (DNF)
—	Mikhail Shchennikov (RUS)	DNF	
—	Jan Staaf (SWE)	DNF	
—	Bengt Bengtsson (SWE)	DNF	
—	Pierce O'Callaghan (IRL)	DNF	

== See also ==
- 1995 Men's World Championships 20km Walk (Gothenburg)
- 1996 Men's Olympic 20km Walk (Atlanta)
- 1997 Men's World Championships 20km Walk (Athens)
- 1998 Race Walking Year Ranking
- 1999 Men's World Championships 20km Walk (Seville)
- 2000 Men's Olympic 20km Walk (Sydney)
- 2001 Men's World Championships 20km Walk (Edmonton)
