= Athletics at the 1999 Pan American Games – Men's 20 kilometres walk =

Men's 20 kilometres walk at the Pan American Games

The men's 20 kilometres walk event at the 1999 Pan American Games was held on July 26.

== Results ==
Rank	Name	Nationality	Time	Notes
1st place, gold medalist(s)	Bernardo Segura	Mexico	1:20:17	GR
2nd place, silver medalist(s)	Daniel García	Mexico	1:20:28	
3rd place, bronze medalist(s)	Jefferson Pérez	Ecuador	1:20:46	
4	Julio René Martínez	Guatemala	1:20:58	
5	Arturo Huerta	Canada	1:22:02	
6	Curt Clausen	United States	1:23:39	
7	Luis Fernando García	Guatemala	1:26:24	
8	Tim Berrett	Canada	1:27:04	
9	Tim Seaman	United States	1:28:28	
	Jorge Pino	Cuba	DNS	
