= 1997 European Athletics U23 Championships – Men's 20 kilometres walk =

The men's 20 kilometres race walk event at the 1997 European Athletics U23 Championships was held in Turku, Finland, on 10 July 1997.

== Medalists ==
Gold	Aigars Fadejevs; Latvia
Silver	Paquillo Fernández; Spain
Bronze	Artur Meliashkevich; Belarus

== Results ==
=== Final ===
10 July

Rank	Name	Nationality	Time	Notes
1st place, gold medalist(s)	Aigars Fadejevs	Latvia	1:19:58	
2nd place, silver medalist(s)	Paquillo Fernández	Spain	1:21:59	
3rd place, bronze medalist(s)	Artur Meliashkevich	Belarus	1:22:26	
4	Yevgeniy Shmalyuk	Russia	1:22:38	
5	Andreas Erm	Germany	1:22:55	
6	Anthony Gillet	France	1:23:10	
7	Lorenzo Civallero	Italy	1:23:45	
8	Pavel Nikolayev	Russia	1:24:25	
9	José Alejandro Cambil	Spain	1:24:44	
10	Vitaliy Stetsyshyn	Ukraine	1:25:38	
11	Gintaras Andriuškevičius	Lithuania	1:26:58	
12	Silviu Casandra	Romania	1:27:18	
13	Roman Magdziarczyk	Poland	1:27:36	
14	Trond Nymark	Norway	1:29:44	
15	Pierce O'Callaghan	Ireland	1:40:24	
	Ivan Trotskiy	Belarus	DQ	
	João Vieira	Portugal	DNF	
	Sérgio Vieira	Portugal	DNF	

== Participation ==
According to an unofficial count, 18 athletes from 14 countries participated in the event.

- Belarus (2)
- France (1)
- Germany (1)
- Ireland (1)
- Italy (1)
- Latvia (1)
- Lithuania (1)
- Norway (1)
- Poland (1)
- Portugal (2)
- Romania (1)
- Russia (2)
- Spain (2)
- Ukraine (1)
