= 2001 World Championships in Athletics – Men's 20 kilometres walk =

The Men's 20 km Walk at the 2001 World Championships in Edmonton, Alberta, Canada was held on Saturday August 4, 2001, with the start at 15:50h.

== Medalists ==
Gold	Roman Rasskazov; Russia (RUS)
Silver	Ilya Markov; Russia (RUS)
Bronze	Viktor Burayev; Russia (RUS)

== Abbreviations ==
- All times shown are in hours:minutes:seconds

DNS	did not start
NM	no mark
WR	world record
WL	world leading
AR	area record
NR	national record
PB	personal best
SB	season best

== Records ==
Standing records prior to the 2001 World Athletics Championships
World Record	Julio René Martínez (GUA)	1:17.46	May 8, 1999	Eisenhüttenstadt, Germany
World Record	Roman Rasskazov (RUS)	1:17.46	May 19, 2000	Moscow, Russia
Event Record	Maurizio Damilano (ITA)	1:19.37	August 24, 1991	Tokyo, Japan
Season Best	Dmitriy Yesipchuk (RUS)	1:18:05	March 4, 2001	Adler, Russia

== Startlist ==
№	Athlete	Season Best	Personal Best
668	Sabir Sharuyayev (KAZ)	1:24:33	1:24:33
788	Alejandro López (MEX)	1:20:49	1:17:56
964	Viktor Burayev (RUS)	1:18:06	1:18:06
256	Miloš Holuša (CZE)	1:22:27	1:21:58
979	Ilya Markov (RUS)	1:19:36	1:18:30
661	Satoshi Yanagisawa (JPN)	1:21:20	1:19:29
463	Andreas Erm (GER)	1:19:32	1:18:42
931	Silviu Casandra (ROM)	1:22:34	1:21:35
39	Nathan Deakes (AUS)	1:18:14	1:18:14
153	Tim Berrett (CAN)	1:23:46	1:21:46
797	Joel Sánchez (MEX)		1:19:00
304	David Márquez (ESP)	1:21:09	1:21:09
200	Li Zewen (CHN)	1:21:10	1:18:32
114	Ivan Trotskiy (BLR)	1:21:43	1:19:48
744	Gintaras Andriuškevicius (LTU)	1:22:09	1:22:09
963	Vladimir Andreyev (RUS)	1:20:14	1:18:16
878	Rami Abdelhabi Al-Deeb (PLE)		1:31:22
389	Anthony Gillet (FRA)	1:22:16	1:21:26
110	Artur Meleshkevich (BLR)		1:19:15
559	Robert Heffernan (IRL)	1:21:11	1:21:11
584	Lorenzo Civallero (ITA)	1:22:10	1:22:10
261	Jiří Malysa (CZE)	1:20:21	1:19:18
172	Arturo Huerta (CAN)	1:29:09	1:21:03
514	Luis Fernando García (GUA)	1:23:04	1:21:52
921	João Vieira (POR)	1:22:52	1:20:59
1108	Hatem Ghoula (TUN)	1:21:41	1:19:02
477	André Höhne (GER)	1:22:49	1:22:05
1199	Timothy Seaman (USA)	1:26:15	1:23:42
719	Aigars Fadejevs (LAT)	1:19:53	1:19:36
112	Yevgeniy Misyulya (BLR)	1:19:45	1:18:18
281	Jefferson Pérez (ECU)		1:18:24
590	Alessandro Gandellini (ITA)	1:21:42	1:20:28
787	Noe Hernández (MEX)		1:19:03
746	Daugvinas Zujus (LTU)	1:22:35	1:22:35
297	Paquillo Fernández (ESP)	1:19:47	1:18:56
698	Shin Il-Yong (KOR)	1:22:35	1:22:35
984	Roman Rasskazov (RUS)	1:20:30	1:17:46

== Intermediates ==
Rank	Number	Athlete	Time
5 KILOMETRES
1	979	Ilya Markov (RUS)	20:40
2	963	Vladimir Andreyev (RUS)	20:41
3	261	Jiří Malysa (CZE)	20:41
4	719	Aigars Fadejevs (LAT)	20:41
5	787	Noé Hernández (MEX)	20:42
10 KILOMETRES
1	963	Vladimir Andreyev (RUS)	41:05
2	979	Ilya Markov (RUS)	41:05
3	297	Paquillo Fernández (ESP)	41:05
4	787	Noé Hernández (MEX)	41:05
5	719	Aigars Fadejevs (LAT)	41:05
15 KILOMETRES
1	979	Ilya Markov (RUS)	1:01:17
2	39	Nathan Deakes (AUS)	1:01:17
3	297	Paquillo Fernández (ESP)	1:01:18
4	112	Yevgeniy Misyulya (BLR)	1:01:18
5	964	Viktor Burayev (RUS)	1:01:18

== Final ranking ==
Rank	Athlete	Time	Note
1st place, gold medalist(s)	Roman Rasskazov (RUS)	1:20:31	SB
2nd place, silver medalist(s)	Ilya Markov (RUS)	1:20:33	
3rd place, bronze medalist(s)	Viktor Burayev (RUS)	1:20:36	
4	Nathan Deakes (AUS)	1:20:55	
5	David Márquez (ESP)	1:21:09	PB
6	Joel Sánchez (MEX)	1:22:05	
7	Satoshi Yanagisawa (JPN)	1:22:11	
8	Jefferson Pérez (ECU)	1:22:20	
9	Jiří Malysa (CZE)	1:22:42	
10	Hatem Ghoula (TUN)	1:23:14	
11	Alejandro López (MEX)	1:23:20	
12	Alessandro Gandellini (ITA)	1:24:05	
13	Li Zewen (CHN)	1:24:29	
14	Robert Heffernan (IRL)	1:25:02	
15	Ivan Trotski (BLR)	1:25:02	
16	Lorenzo Civallero (ITA)	1:25:28	
17	Miloš Holuša (CZE)	1:25:37	
18	Luis Fernando García (GUA)	1:26:47	
19	Shin Il-Yong (KOR)	1:27:47	
20	Gintaras Andriuškevicius (LTU)	1:27:53	
21	Arturo Huerta (CAN)	1:29:27	
22	Silviu Casandra (ROM)	1:29:49	
23	Anthony Gillet (FRA)	1:31:24	
24	Sabir Sharuyayev (KAZ)	1:32:03	
DISQUALIFIED (DSQ)
—	Tim Berrett (CAN)	DSQ	
—	Vladimir Andreyev (RUS)	DSQ	
—	Rami Abdelhabi Al-Deeb (PLE)	DSQ	
—	Artur Meleshkevich (BLR)	DSQ	
—	João Vieira (POR)	DSQ	
—	Timothy Seaman (USA)	DSQ	
—	Yevgeniy Misyulya (BLR)	DSQ	
—	Noé Hernández (MEX)	DSQ	
—	Daugvinas Zujus (LTU)	DSQ	
DID NOT FINISH (DNF)
—	Andreas Erm (GER)	DNF	
—	André Höhne (GER)	DNF	
—	Aigars Fadejevs (LAT)	DNF	
—	Paquillo Fernández (ESP)	DNF	

== See also ==
- 2001 Race Walking Year Ranking
