= Athletics at the 1997 Summer Universiade – Men's 20 kilometres walk =

The men's 20 kilometres walk event at the 1997 Summer Universiade was held on the streets of Catania, Italy, on 31 August.

== Results ==
Rank	Athlete	Nationality	Time	Notes
1st place, gold medalist(s)	Ilya Markov	Russia	1:25:36	
2nd place, silver medalist(s)	Alejandro López	Mexico	1:26:00	
3rd place, bronze medalist(s)	Arturo Di Mezza	Italy	1:26:12	
4	Daisuke Ikeshima	Japan	1:27:09	
5	Nathan Deakes	Australia	1:28:04	
6	Paolo Bianchi	Italy	1:31:39	
7	Wu Ping	China	1:31:45	
8	Oscar Ramírez	Mexico	1:32:07	
9	Brent Vallance	Australia	1:32:27	
10	Enrico Lang	Italy	1:32:57	
11	William Van Axen	United States	1:32:57	
12	Tim Seaman	United States	1:34:41	
13	Jani Lehtinen	Finland	1:34:50	
	Ademar Kammler	Brazil	DNF	
