= Moțpan =

Moțpan is a Moldovan surname. Notable people with the surname include:

- Dumitru Moțpan (1940–2018), Moldovan politician
- Efim Moțpan (born 1971), Moldovan racewalker
- Nichita Moțpan (born 2001), Moldovan footballer
