= Athletics at the 2004 Summer Olympics – Men's 20 kilometres walk =

Men's 20 kilometres walk at the Games of the XXVIII Olympiad
- Olympic Athletics
- Venue: Athens Olympic Stadium
- Dates: 20 August
- Competitors: 48 from 28 nations
- Winning time: 1:19:40

Medalists
1st place, gold medalist(s)		Ivano Brugnetti	Italy
2nd place, silver medalist(s)		Paquillo Fernández	Spain
3rd place, bronze medalist(s)		Nathan Deakes	Australia

The men's 20 kilometres race walk at the 2004 Summer Olympics as part of the athletics program was held through the streets of Athens with the start and finish at the Athens Olympic Stadium on August 20.

The Chinese trio of Han Yucheng, Liu Yunfeng, and Zhu Hongjun took an early lead as the race walkers had left the stadium, but their challenge never materialized. Han could not keep up with the leaders through the first lap and soon fell off the pace, leaving Liu and Zhu with a burden to defend their chances. Approaching the second and third lap, Spain's Paquillo Fernández soon joined the Chinese duo to toughen the pace and build a commanding lead over the rest of the field, followed by his teammate Juan Manuel Molina, Ivano Brugnetti, Nathan Deakes, African champion Hatem Ghoula, and overwhelming favorite Jefferson Pérez.

When Ghoula was given his first warning with a yellow card on possession at the 6k mark, the leading pack had been whittled down to eight. Halfway through the race and with only four laps to go, Fernandez, Brugnetti, and Deakes were the strongest chasers, forming a slightly tight group to decide on the medals. Perez, however, struggled to keep up the pace on the leaders by a ten-metre deficit with Zhu and 2000 Olympic silver medalist Noé Hernández following him.

Fifty minutes into the race, Brugnetti steadily turned to break away from the leading group with Fernandez and Deakes continuously chasing him to the front. While Hernandez was disqualified after the red paddle, Perez managed to bridge back to the leaders with only a few laps remaining, but eventually fell behind. This left with Brugnetti, Fernandez, and Deakes walking closely and swiftly towards the 18k mark, before the two Europeans zoomed past Deakes to gain a three-second lead going to the final lap. Brugnetti made a decisive move to put some distance ahead of Fernandez in the approach to the Olympic Stadium.

As Fernandez could not close the gap on the final stretch, a jubilant Brugnetti celebrated all the way to a superb finish, and savored his Olympic gold medal in 1:19:40, just five seconds ahead of the Spaniard. Behind the two European rivals, Deakes managed to hold on for the bronze with Perez placing to a disappointing fourth.

== Records ==
Prior to the competition, the existing World and Olympic records were as follows:

World record	Jefferson Pérez (ECU)	1:17:21	Paris, France	23 August 2003
Olympic record	Robert Korzeniowski (POL)	1:18:59	Sydney, Australia	22 September 2000

No new records were set during the competition.

== Qualification ==
The qualification period for athletics was 1 January 2003 to 9 August 2004. For the men's 20 kilometres race walk, each National Olympic Committee was permitted to enter up to three athletes that had run the race in 1:23:00 or faster during the qualification period. If an NOC had no athletes that qualified under that standard, one athlete that had run the race in 1:24:30 or faster could be entered.

== Schedule ==
All times are Greece Standard Time (UTC+2)

Date	Time	Round
Friday, 20 August 2004	09:00	Final

== Results ==
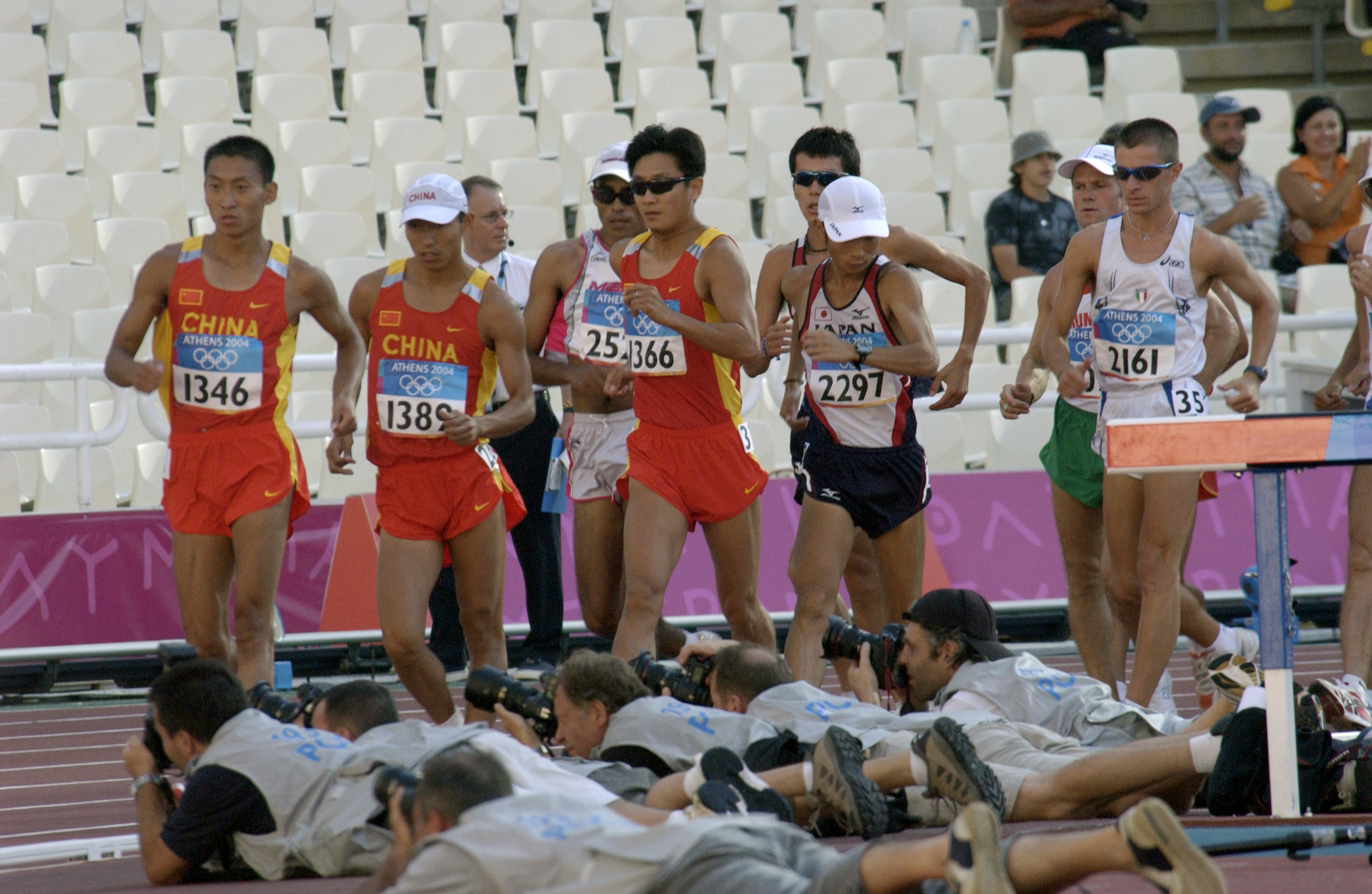
Initial stage of the race

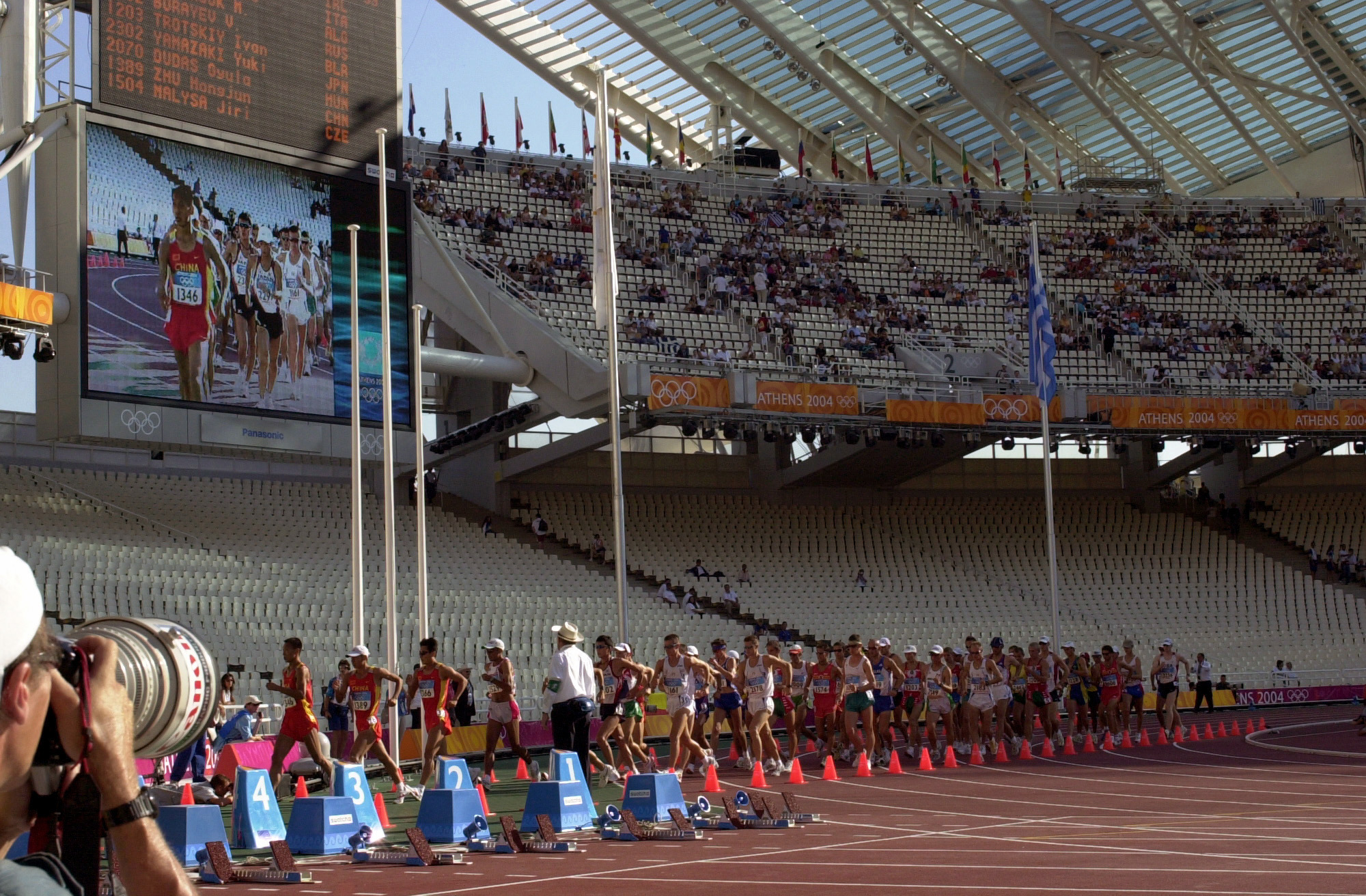
Athletes leaving the stadium

Rank	Name	Nationality	Result	Notes
1st place, gold medalist(s)	Ivano Brugnetti	Italy	1:19:40	PB
2nd place, silver medalist(s)	Paquillo Fernández	Spain	1:19:45	
3rd place, bronze medalist(s)	Nathan Deakes	Australia	1:20:02	
4	Jefferson Pérez	Ecuador	1:20:38	
5	Juan Manuel Molina	Spain	1:20:55	
6	Zhu Hongjun	China	1:21:40	
7	Vladimir Andreyev	Russia	1:21:53	
8	André Höhne	Germany	1:21:56	
9	Aigars Fadejevs	Latvia	1:22:08	SB
10	João Vieira	Portugal	1:22:19	
11	Hatem Ghoula	Tunisia	1:22:59	
12	Benjamin Kuciński	Poland	1:23:08	
13	Marco Giungi	Italy	1:23:30	
14	José Alessandro Bagio	Brazil	1:23:33	
15	Takayuki Tanii	Japan	1:23:38	
16	Luke Adams	Australia	1:23:52	
17	Rolando Saquipay	Ecuador	1:24:07	
18	Omar Segura	Mexico	1:24:35	
19	Yevgeniy Misyulya	Belarus	1:25:10	
20	Timothy Seaman	United States	1:25:17	
21	Kevin Eastler	United States	1:25:20	
22	Viktor Burayev	Russia	1:25:36	
23	Ivan Trotski	Belarus	1:25:53	
24	Luis Fernando López	Colombia	1:26:34	
25	Liu Yunfeng	China	1:27:21	
26	John Nunn	United States	1:27:38	
27	Valeriy Borisov	Kazakhstan	1:27:39	
28	Gintaras Andriuškevičius	Lithuania	1:27:56	
29	Shin Il-yong	South Korea	1:28:02	
30	Gyula Dudás	Hungary	1:28:18	
31	Moussa Aouanouk	Algeria	1:28:38	
32	Matej Tóth	Slovakia	1:28:49	
33	Lee Dae-ro	South Korea	1:28:59	
34	Fedosei Ciumacenco	Moldova	1:29:06	
35	Andrey Talashko	Belarus	1:29:36	
36	Elefthérios Thanópoulos	Greece	1:30:15	
37	José David Domínguez	Spain	1:30:16	
38	Vladimir Parvatkin	Russia	1:31:13	
39	Predrag Filipović	Serbia and Montenegro	1:31:35	
40	Han Yucheng	China	1:32:18	
41	Park Chil-sung	South Korea	1:32:41	
	Alessandro Gandellini	Italy	DNF	
	Bernardo Segura	Mexico	DNF	
	Yuki Yamazaki	Japan	DNF	
	Xavier Moreno	Ecuador	DSQ	
	Jiří Malysa	Czech Republic	DSQ	
	Noé Hernández	Mexico	DSQ	
	Robert Heffernan	Ireland	DSQ	
