= Michele Didoni =

Italian racewalker (born 1974)

Personal information
- Nationality: Italian
- Born: 7 March 1974 (age 52) Milan
- Height: 1.76 m (5 ft 9 1/2 in)
- Weight: 73 kg (161 lb)

Sport
- Country: Italy
- Sport: Athletics
- Event: Race walking
- Club: C.S. Carabinieri

Achievements and titles
- Personal bests: 20 km: 1:19:59 (1995); 50 km: 3:51:53 (1998)
Medal record
World Championships
Gold medal – first place	1995 Gothenburg	20 km walk team
Mediterranean Games
Silver medal – second place	1997 Bari	20 km walk

Michele Didoni (born 7 March 1974 in Milan) is an Italian retired race walker, world champion of the 20 km race walk at Gothenburg 1995.

== Biography ==
He won six times the national championships at senior level. and after his retire, he was the coach of Italian Olympic champion Alex Schwazer.

== Achievements ==
Year	Competition	Venue	Position	Event	Notes
Representing Italy
1992	World Junior Championships	Seoul, South Korea	6th	10,000 m	41:42.75
1994	European Championships	Helsinki, Finland	10th	20 km	1:23:21
1995	World Race Walking Cup	Beijing, PR China	5th	20 km	1:20:50
1995	World Championships	Gothenburg, Sweden	1st	20 km	1:19:59
1996	Olympic Games	Atlanta, United States	34th	20 km	1:26:02
1997	World Championships	Athens, Greece	7th	20 km	1:23:14
1997	Mediterranean Games	Bari, Italy	2nd	20 km	1:25:21
1998	European Championships	Budapest, Hungary	11th	20 km	1:25.54
1999	World Championships	Seville, Spain	10th	20 km	1:26:00
2000	European Race Walking Cup	Eisenhüttenstadt, Germany	14th	20 km	1:21:51
2000	Olympic Games	Sydney, Australia	11th	20 km	1:21:43
2002	European Championships	Munich, Germany	—	20 km	DSQ
2003	World Championships	Paris, France	16th	20 km	1:21:23
2005	Mediterranean Games	Almería, Spain	3rd	20 km	1:26:06

== National titles ==
- Italian Athletics Championships
  - 10 km walk: road: 1994, 1996, 1998, 2001
  - 20 km walk: road: 1995
  - 50 km walk: road: 1998

== See also ==
- FIDAL Hall of Fame
- Italian all-time lists - 20 km walk
