= Anthony Gillet =

French racewalker (born 1976)

Anthony Gillet (born 7 February 1976 in Rennes, Ille-et-Vilaine) is a retired male racewalker from France. He competed for his native country in the men's 20 km race walk event at the 2000 Summer Olympics.

== Achievements ==
Year	Competition	Venue	Position	Event	Notes
Representing France
1994	World Junior Championships	Lisbon, Portugal	29th	10,000m	46:25.35
1997	European U23 Championships	Turku, Finland	6th	20 km	1:23:10
1998	European Championships	Budapest, Hungary	16th	20 km	1:27:07
1999	World Race Walking Cup	Mézidon-Canon, France	67th	20 km	1:31:06
2000	European Race Walking Cup	Eisenhüttenstadt, Germany	10th	20 km	1:21:28
2000	Olympic Games	Sydney, Australia	33rd	20 km	1:27:36
2001	European Race Walking Cup	Dudince, Slovakia	14th	20 km	1:22:44
2001	World Championships	Edmonton, Canada	23rd	20 km	1:31:24
