= Uģis Brūvelis =

Latvian race walker

Uģis Brūvelis (born June 28, 1971) is a Latvian race walker. He was born in Balgale parish.

== Achievements ==
Year	Competition	Venue	Position	Notes
Representing Latvia
2000	European Race Walking Cup	Eisenhüttenstadt, Germany	27th	50 km
2000	Olympic Games	Sydney, Australia	35th	50 km
2001	European Race Walking Cup	Dudince, Slovakia	27th	50 km
2001	World Championships	Edmonton, Canada	30th	50 km
2002	European Championships	Munich, Germany	19th	50 km
2006	European Championships	Gothenburg, Sweden	18th	50 km
