= Māris Putenis =

Latvian racewalker

Personal information
- Nationality: Latvian
- Born: 20 June 1982 (age 44)

Sport
- Sport: Athletics
- Event: Racewalking

Māris Putenis (born 20 June 1982) is a Latvian racewalker. He competed in the men's 20 kilometres walk at the 2000 Summer Olympics.
