= Satoshi Yanagisawa =

Japanese race walker

Satoshi Yanagisawa (Japanese: 柳澤 哲; born January 19, 1971, in Nagano) is a retired male race walker from Japan. He set his personal best (1:19.29) in the men's 20 km on January 30, 2000, in Kobe.

== International competitions ==
Representing Japan
Year	Competition	Venue	Position	Event	Notes
1999	World Race Walking Cup	Mézidon-Canon, France	78th	20 km	
2000	Olympic Games	Sydney, Australia	22nd	20 km	
2001	World Championships	Edmonton, Canada	7th	20 km	
2001	East Asian Games	Osaka, Japan	2nd	20 km	
2002	Asian Games	Busan, South Korea	3rd	20 km	
