= Jiří Malysa =

Czech race walker

Jiří Malysa (born 14 August 1966 in Opava) is a Czech retired race walker. He competed in three consecutive Summer Olympics for the Czech Republic, starting in 1996. He participated in the World Championships in Athletics in 2001 and 2003. Over the 20 km road distance, he holds the Czech record of 1:19:18. Although he never won a medal at a major championship, he competed extensively with many appearances at the IAAF World Race Walking Cup and having twice represented his country at the European Athletics Championships.

== Achievements ==
Year	Competition	Venue	Position	Event	Notes
Representing Czech Republic
1995	World Race Walking Cup	Beijing, China	63rd	20 km	1:31:08
1996	Olympic Games	Atlanta, United States	25th	20 km	1:25:13
1997	World Race Walking Cup	Poděbrady, Czech Republic	52nd	20 km	1:23:55
1998	European Championships	Budapest, Hungary	21st	20 km	1:30:16
1999	World Race Walking Cup	Mézidon-Canon, France	73rd	20 km	1:33:11
2000	European Race Walking Cup	Eisenhüttenstadt, Germany	4th	20 km	1:19:18
2000	Olympic Games	Sydney, Australia	19th	20 km	1:24:08
2001	European Race Walking Cup	Dudince, Slovakia	6th	20 km	1:20:21
2001	World Championships	Edmonton, Canada	9th	20 km	1:22:42
2002	World Race Walking Cup	Turin, Italy	14th	20 km	1:25:34
2002	European Championships	Munich, Germany	13th	20 km	1:22:12
2002	European Championships	Munich, Germany	—	50 km	DSQ
2003	World Championships	Paris, France	27th	20 km	1:30:17
2004	World Race Walking Cup	Naumburg, Germany	—	50 km	DSQ
2004	Olympic Games	Athens, Greece	—	20 km	DSQ
