= Daugvinas Zujus =

Lithuanian racewalker (born 1975)

Daugvinas Zujus (born 16 October 1975 in Birštonas, Kaunas) is a retired male racewalker from Lithuania. He competed for his native Baltic country in the men's 50 km race walk event at three consecutive Summer Olympics, starting in 1996 (Atlanta, Georgia). Zujus set his personal best (3:55:10) in the same distance on 6 June 1998 in Ogre, Latvia.

== Achievements ==
Year	Competition	Venue	Position	Notes
Representing Lithuania
2000	European Race Walking Cup	Eisenhüttenstadt, Germany	30th	20 km
2000	Olympic Games	Sydney, Australia	30th	50 km
2001	European Race Walking Cup	Dudince, Slovakia	18th	20 km
2001	World Championships	Edmonton, Canada	DSQ	20 km
2002	Lithuanian Championships	Kaunas, Lithuania	1st	20 km
2004	Olympic Games	Athens, Greece	30th	50 km
