= Vladimir Potemin =

Russian racewalker

Vladimir Potemin (born 24 January 1979) is a retired male race walker from Russia.

== Achievements ==
| Year | Competition | Venue | Position | Event | Notes |
Representing Russia
| 1999 | European Junior Championships | Riga, Latvia | 2nd | 10 km | |
| 2000 | Olympic Games | Sydney, Australia | 26th | 50 km | |
| 2001 | European Race Walking Cup | Dudince, Slovakia | 3rd | 50 km | 3:46:12 |
| 2001 | World Championships | Edmonton, Canada | 5th | 50 km | |
| 2002 | World Race Walking Cup | Turin, Italy | 17th | 50 km | |
| 2003 | Universiade | Daegu, South Korea | 2nd | 20 km | |
