= Noé Hernández (race walker) =

Mexican racewalker

Noé "El Chivo" Hernández Valentin (March 15, 1978 – January 16, 2013) was a Mexican race walker. Hernández won a silver medal at the 2000 Olympics and participated at the 2004 Olympics.

On December 30, 2012, Hernández was shot in the head, and left the hospital on January 8, 2013. Hernández died on January 16, 2013, in Chimalhuacán, State of Mexico due to a cardiac arrest.

== Achievements ==
Year	Competition	Venue	Position	Event	Notes
Representing Mexico
1999	Central American and Caribbean Championships	Bridgetown, Barbados	1st	20 km	1:20:49
2000	Olympic Games	Sydney, Australia	2nd	20 km	1:19:03
2001	World Championships	Edmonton, Canada	—	20 km	DSQ
2003	World Championships	Paris, France	4th	20 km	1:18:14 = PB
2004	Olympic Games	Athens, Greece	—	20 km	DSQ
