= Luis Fernando García =

Guatemalan racewalker

Personal information
- Full name: Luis Fernando García Bechinie
- Born: 13 September 1975 (age 51) Amatitlán, Guatemala, Guatemala
- Height: 1.74 m (5 ft 8 1/2 in)
- Weight: 62 kg (137 lb)

Sport
- Country: Guatemala
- Sport: Men's Athletics
- Event: Racewalking
Medal record
Men's Athletics
Representing Guatemala
Pan American Games
Bronze medal – third place	2003 Santo Domingo	50 km
Central American and Caribbean Games
Silver medal – second place	2002 San Salvador	20 km
Silver medal – second place	2006 Cartagena	20 km
Central American and Caribbean Championships
Gold medal – first place	2001 Guatemala City	20 km
Central American Games
Gold medal – first place	2001 Guatemala City	20 km
Central American Championships
Gold medal – first place	2005 San José	20 km
- Updated on 19 September 2012

Luis Fernando García Bechinie (born 13 September 1974, in Amatitlán) is a male race walker from Guatemala. He competed for his native country in four consecutive Summer Olympics, starting in 1996 (Atlanta, Georgia).

== Achievements ==
Year	Competition	Venue	Position	Event	Notes
Representing Guatemala
1996	Olympic Games	Atlanta, Georgia	43rd	20 km	1:28:28
1997	World Championships	Athens, Greece	31st	20 km	1:28:51
1998	Central American Championships	Guatemala City, Guatemala	1st	20,000 m	1:32:57
1999	Pan American Games	Winnipeg, Canada	7th	20 km	1:26:24
1999	World Championships	Seville, Spain	DNF	20 km	
2000	Olympic Games	Sydney, Australia	32nd	20 km	1:27:16
2001	Central American and Caribbean Championships	Guatemala City, Guatemala	1st	20 km	1:25:44 A
2001	World Championships	Edmonton, Canada	18th	20 km	1:26:47
2001	Universiade	Beijing, China	17th	20 km	1:33:43
2001	Central American Games	Guatemala City, Guatemala	1st	20 km	1:27:52 A
2002	Ibero-American Championships	Guatemala City, Guatemala	3rd	20,000 m	1:25:27
2002	Central American and Caribbean Games	San Salvador, El Salvador	2nd	20 km	1:27:51
2003	Pan American Games	Santo Domingo, Dominican Republic	3rd	50 km	4:12:14
2004	Ibero-American Championships	Huelva, Spain	4th	20,000 m	1:27:00.7
2004	Olympic Games	Athens, Greece	DNF	50 km	
2005	Central American Championships	San José, Costa Rica	1st	20,000 m	1:26:21.85 CR
2005	World Championships	Helsinki, Finland	DNF	50 km	
2006	Central American and Caribbean Games	Cartagena, Colombia	3rd	20 km	1:29:50
2007	Pan American Games	Rio de Janeiro, Brazil	5th	50 km	4:01.36
2008	Olympic Games	Beijing, PR China	22nd	50 km	3:56:58
2009	World Championships	Berlin, Germany	31st	50 km	4:18:13
2010	World Race Walking Cup	Chihuahua, Mexico	DNF	50 km	
