= Li Zewen =

Chinese race walker

Medal record

Men's athletics

Representing China

Asian Championships
Gold medal – first place	1998 Fukuoka	20 km walk

Li Zewen (simplified Chinese: 黎则文; traditional Chinese: 黎則文; pinyin: Lí Zéwén; born 5 December 1973 in Qujing, Yunnan) is a retired Chinese race walker.

== Achievements ==
Year	Competition	Venue	Position	Notes
Representing China
1995	World Race Walking Cup	Beijing, China	1st	20 km
1995	World Championships	Gothenburg, Sweden	5th	20 km
1996	Olympic Games	Atlanta, United States	28th	20 km
1997	World Race Walking Cup	Poděbrady, Czech Republic	4th	20 km
1997	World Championships	Athens, Greece	5th	20 km
1998	Asian Games	Bangkok, Thailand	3rd	20 km
1998	Asian Championships	Fukuoka, Japan	1st	20 km
1999	World Championships	Seville, Spain	4th	20 km
2001	World Championships	Edmonton, Canada	13th	20 km
2001	East Asian Games	Osaka, Japan	1st	20 km
