= Paquillo Fernández =

Spanish race walker

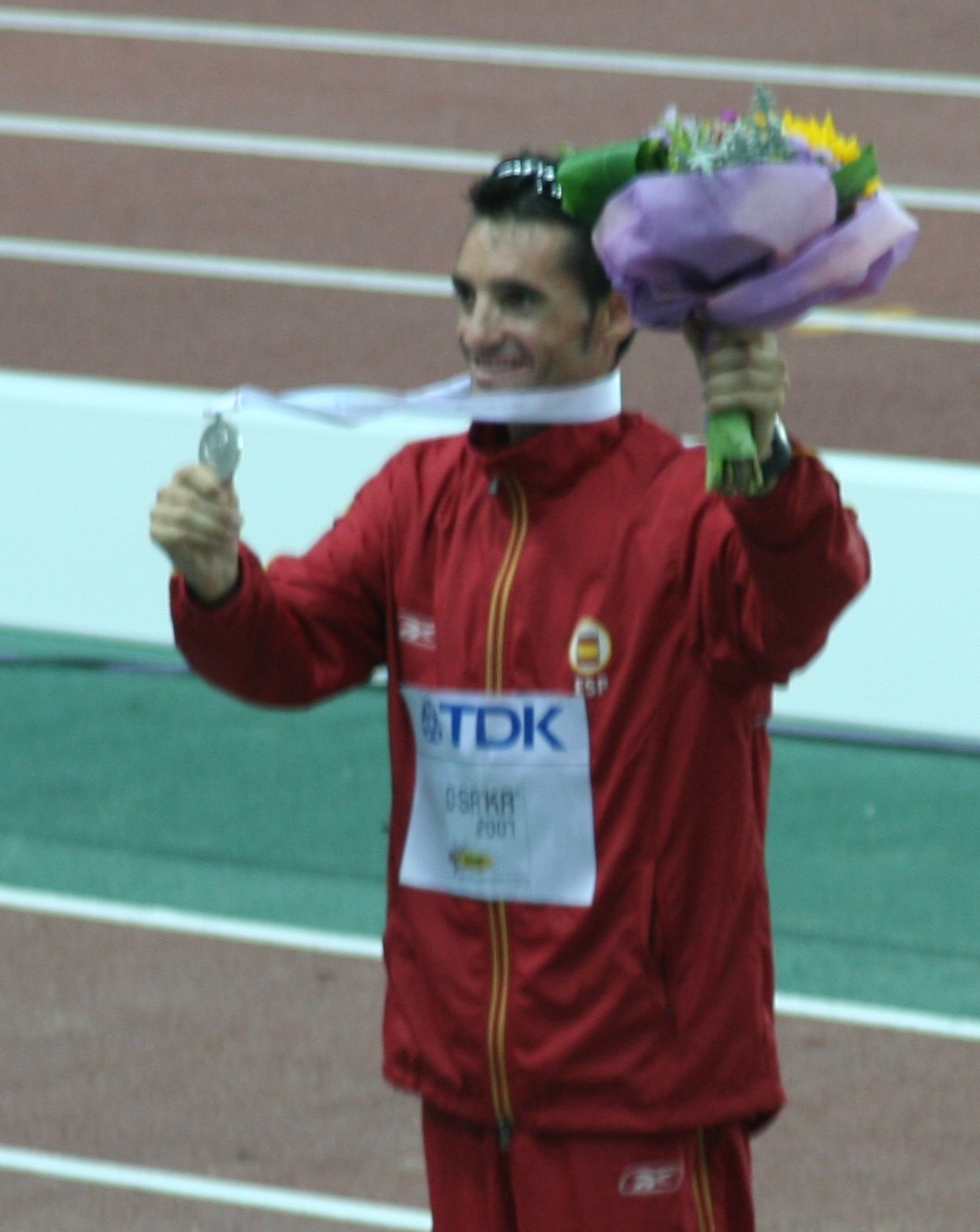
- Fernández at the 2007 World Championships

Medal record

Men's athletics

Representing Spain

Olympic Games
Silver medal – second place	2004 Athens	20 km walk

World Championships
Silver medal – second place	2003 Paris	20 km walk
Silver medal – second place	2005 Helsinki	20 km walk
Silver medal – second place	2007 Osaka	20 km walk

European Championships
Gold medal – first place	2002 Munich	20 km walk
Gold medal – first place	2006 Gothenburg	20 km walk
Bronze medal – third place	1998 Budapest	20 km walk

World Race Walking Cup
Gold medal – first place	2006 A Coruña	20 km walk
Gold medal – first place	2008 Cheboksary	20 km walk

Francisco Javier Fernández Peláez (born 6 March 1977 in Guadix, Province of Granada, Andalusia), better known as Paquillo Fernández, is a retired Spanish race walker. He specialized in the 20 km race walk.

On 27 July 2008 he set a new 10-km race walk world record at the Spanish Championships in a time of 37:53.09.

== International competitions ==
Year	Competition	Venue	Position	Event	Notes
Representing Spain
1996	World Junior Championships	Sydney, Australia	1st	10,000 m	40:38.25
1997	European U23 Championships	Turku, Finland	2nd	20 km	1:21:59
1998	European Race Walking Cup	Dudince, Slovakia	1st	20 km	1:20:31
1998	European Championships	Budapest, Hungary	3rd	20 km	1:21:39
1999	World Championships	Seville, Spain	15th	20 km	1:27:23
1999	World Race Walking Cup	Mézidon-Canon, France	12th	20 km	1:22:47
2000	European Race Walking Cup	Eisenhüttenstadt, Germany	3rd	20 km	1:18:56
2000	Olympic Games	Sydney, Australia	7th	20 km	1:21:01
2001	European Race Walking Cup	Dudince, Slovakia	4th	20 km	1:20:02
2001	World Championships	Edmonton, Canada	—	20 km	DNF
2002	European Championships	Munich, Germany	1st	20 km	1:18:37
2003	European Race Walking Cup	Cheboksary, Russia	1st	20 km	1:19:48
2003	World Championships	Paris, France	2nd	20 km	1:18:00
2004	Olympic Games	Athens, Greece	2nd	20 km	1:19:45
2005	World Championships	Helsinki, Finland	2nd	20 km	1:19:36
2005	Mediterranean Games	Almería, Spain	1st	20 km	1:22:45
2006	European Championships	Gothenburg, Sweden	1st	20 km	1:19:09
2006	World Race Walking Cup	A Coruña, Spain	1st	20 km	1:18:31
2007	World Championships	Osaka, Japan	2nd	20 km	1:22:40
2008	Olympic Games	Beijing, China	7th	20 km	1:20:32
2009	World Championships	Berlin, Germany	—	20 km	DNF

== See also ==
- 2002 Race Walking Year Ranking
- List of doping cases in sport
- List of world records in athletics

Records
Preceded by Julio René Martínez; Roman Rasskazov	Men's 20km Walk World Record Holder; 28 April 2002 – 23 August 2003	Succeeded by Jefferson Pérez
