= Mike Trautmann =

German racewalker

Mike Trautmann (born 13 March 1974) is a retired German race walker.

== Achievements ==
Year	Competition	Venue	Position	Notes
Representing Germany
2000	European Race Walking Cup	Eisenhüttenstadt, Germany	11th	50 km
2000	Olympic Games	Sydney, Australia	19th	50 km
2001	European Race Walking Cup	Dudince, Slovakia	22nd	50 km
2001	World Championships	Edmonton, Canada	10th	50 km
