= Mario Avellaneda =

Spanish race walker

Mario Avellaneda Soriano (born 12 November 1974 in Granollers, Spain) is a Spanish race walker.

== Achievements ==
Year	Competition	Venue	Position	Event	Notes
Representing Spain
2000	European Race Walking Cup	Eisenhüttenstadt, Germany	6th	50 km	3:49:50
2001	European Race Walking Cup	Dudince, Slovakia	16th	50 km	3:56:03
2004	World Race Walking Cup	Naumburg, Germany	9th	50 km	3:53:22
