= Ivan Trotski =

Belarusian race walker

Personal information
- Born: May 27, 1976 (age 50) Voranava, Byelorussian SSR, Soviet Union
- Height: 1.72 m (5 ft 8 in)
- Weight: 63 kg (139 lb)

Sport
- Country: Belarus
- Sport: Athletics
- Event: 50km Race Walk

Ivan Antonavich Trotski (Belarusian: Іва́н Анто́навіч Тро́цкі, Russian: Ива́н Анто́нович Тро́цкий; born 27 May 1976 in Voranava) is a Belarusian race walker.

== Achievements ==
Year	Competition	Venue	Position	Event	Notes
Representing Belarus
1997	European U23 Championships	Turku, Finland	—	20 km	DQ
1998	European Championships	Budapest, Hungary	6th	20 km	1:22.46
1999	World Championships	Seville, Spain	9th	20 km	1:25:54
1999	World Race Walking Cup	Mézidon-Canon, France	13th	20 km	1:22:59
2001	European Race Walking Cup	Dudince, Slovakia	9th	20 km	1:21:43
2001	World Championships	Edmonton, Canada	15th	20 km	1:25:02
2002	European Championships	Munich, Germany	5th	20 km	1:20:52
2002	World Race Walking Cup	Turin, Italy	13th	20 km	1:24:29
2003	World Championships	Paris, France	6th	20 km	1:19:40
2003	Military World Games	Catania, Italy	3rd	10,000 m	39:34.99
2004	World Race Walking Cup	Naumburg, Germany	10th	20 km	1:20:41
2004	Olympic Games	Athens, Greece	23rd	20 km	1:25:53
2005	World Championships	Helsinki, Finland	—	20 km	DSQ
2007	World Championships	Osaka, Japan	27th	20 km	1:27:56
2008	Olympic Games	Beijing, China	22nd	20 km	1:22:55
2008	World Race Walking Cup	Cheboksary, Russia	14th	20 km	1:20:56
2009	European Race Walking Cup	Metz, France	—	20 km	DSQ
2011	European Race Walking Cup	Olhão, Portugal	—	50 km	DNF
2012	World Race Walking Cup	Saransk, Russia	16th	20 km	1:22:05
2012	Olympic Games	London, United Kingdom	16th	20 km	1:21:23
2012	Olympic Games	London, United Kingdom	13th	50 km	3:46:09
2013	European Race Walking Cup	Dudince, Slovakia	19th	20 km	1:24:54
2013	World Championships	Moscow, Russia	14th	50 km	3:47:52
2014	World Race Walking Cup	Taicang, China	40th	20 km	1:22:24
2015	European Race Walking Cup	Murcia, Spain	—	50 km	DQ
