= Andreas Erm =

German race walker

Andreas Erm (born 12 March 1976, in Berlin (East)) is a former German race walker.

At the 1995 European Athletics Junior Championships Erm won the Men's 10 kilometres walk aged 19. Almost one year later at the 1996 Olympic Summer Games in Atlanta, he started in the Men's 20 kilometres walk where he placed 24th. Next year, in the European Athletics U23 Championships he came in 5th over the same distance.

In the 1998 European Athletics Championships he placed 4th in the Men's 20 kilometres walk. At the 2000 European Race Walking Cup held in Germany Erm came in 2nd in the same discipline. Later that year, at the 2000 Olympic Summer Games in Sydney he placed 5th at the end, again over the same distance.

At the 2001 European Race Walking Cup Erm placed 3rd in the Men's 20 kilometres walk, a success he could repeat at the 2003 World Championships in Athletics in the more challenging Men's 50 kilometres walk. At the 2004 Olympic Summer Games in Athens, he had been disqualified for improper walking 30 km in the Men's 50 kilometres walk while at a good 5th position.

Since his start at the Olympic Games in Athens Mr. Erm did suffer from an, at first incorrectly diagnosed, injury to the hips which also affected the muscles. Further health problems afterwards brought along setbacks in training and competition. On 10 June 2008 Andreas Erm announced the end of his active career at the age of 32.

== Achievements ==
Year	Competition	Venue	Position	Event	Notes
Representing Germany
1994	World Junior Championships	Lisbon, Portugal	9th	10,000 m	42:21.72
1995	European Junior Championships	Nyíregyháza, Hungary	1st	10,000 m	40:51.38
1996	Olympic Games	Atlanta, United States	24th	20 km	1:25:08
1997	European U23 Championships	Turku, Finland	5th	20 km	1:22:55
1998	European Championships	Budapest, Hungary	4th	20 km	1:21.53
2000	European Race Walking Cup	Eisenhüttenstadt, Germany	2nd	20 km	1:18:42
2000	Olympic Games	Sydney, Australia	5th	20 km	1:20:25
2001	European Race Walking Cup	Dudince, Slovakia	3rd	20 km	1:19:51
2001	World Championships	Edmonton, Canada	—	20 km	DNF
2003	World Championships	Paris, France	3rd	50 km	3:37:46
2004	Olympic Games	Athens, Greece	—	50 km	DSQ
