= Róbert Valíček =

Slovak racewalker

Róbert Valíček (born March 10, 1969, in Martin, Žilina Region) is a retired male race walker from Slovakia. He set his personal best (1:20.58) in the men's 20 km event on April 19, 1997, in Poděbrady, Czech Republic.

== Achievements ==
Year	Competition	Venue	Position	Event	Notes
Representing Slovakia
1994	European Championships	Helsinki, Finland	13th	20 km	1:24:13
1996	Olympic Games	Atlanta, United States	38th	20 km	1:27:27
1997	World Race Walking Cup	Poděbrady, Czech Republic	27th	20 km	1:20:58
1997	World Championships	Athens, Greece	33rd	20 km	1:31:28
1998	European Championships	Budapest, Hungary	17th	20 km	1:27:25
1999	World Race Walking Cup	Mézidon-Canon, France	28th	20 km	1:26:00
1999	World Championships	Seville, Spain	DSQ	20 km	—
2000	Olympic Games	Sydney, Australia	41st	20 km	1:30:46
