= Efim Motpan =

Moldovan racewalker

Personal information
- Nationality: Moldovan
- Born: 10 February 1971 (age 55) Cornești, Moldavian SSR

Sport
- Sport: Athletics
- Event: Racewalking

Efim Motpan (Efim Moțpan; born 10 February 1971) is a Moldovan racewalker. He competed in the men's 20 kilometres walk at the 2000 Summer Olympics.
