= Athletics at the 2000 Summer Olympics – Men's 20 kilometres walk =

Men's 20 kilometres walk at the Games of the XXVII Olympiad
- Venue: Stadium Australia
- Date: 22 September
- Competitors: 47 from 28 nations
- Winning time: 1:18:59 OR

Medalists
| 1st place, gold medalist(s) | | Robert Korzeniowski; Poland |
| 2nd place, silver medalist(s) | | Noé Hernández; Mexico |
| 3rd place, bronze medalist(s) | | Vladimir Andreyev; Russia |

The Men's 20 kilometer Race Walk event at the 2000 Summer Olympics took place on Friday 22 September 2000 in Sydney, Australia.

== Medalists ==
| Gold | Robert Korzeniowski; Poland |
| Silver | Noé Hernández; Mexico |
| Bronze | Vladimir Andreyev; Russia |

== Abbreviations ==
- All times shown are in hours:minutes:seconds

| DNS | did not start |
| NM | no mark |
| OR | olympic record |
| WR | world record |
| AR | area record |
| NR | national record |
| PB | personal best |
| SB | season best |

== Records ==
Standing records prior to the 2000 Summer Olympics
| World Record | Julio René Martínez (GUA) | 1:17.46 | 5 August 1999 | Eisenhüttenstadt, Germany |
| Olympic Record | Jozef Pribilinec (TCH) | 1:19.57 | 23 September 1988 | Seoul, South Korea |

== Results ==
| Rank | Athlete | Country | Time | Note |
|---|---|---|---|---|
| 1st place, gold medalist(s) | Robert Korzeniowski | Poland | 1:18:59 | OR |
| 2nd place, silver medalist(s) | Noé Hernández | Mexico | 1:19:03 | PB |
| 3rd place, bronze medalist(s) | Vladimir Andreyev | Russia | 1:19:27 | |
| 4 | Jefferson Pérez | Ecuador | 1:20:18 | |
| 5 | Andreas Erm | Germany | 1:20:25 | |
| 6 | Roman Rasskazov | Russia | 1:20:57 | |
| 7 | Paquillo Fernández | Spain | 1:21:01 | |
| 8 | Nathan Deakes | Australia | 1:21:03 | SB |
| 9 | Alessandro Gandellini | Italy | 1:21:14 | |
| 10 | Nicholas A'Hern | Australia | 1:21:34 | |
| 11 | Michele Didoni | Italy | 1:21:43 | SB |
| 12 | Daniel Garcia | Mexico | 1:22:05 | SB |
| 13 | Yu Guohui | China | 1:22:32 | SB |
| 14 | Aigars Fadejevs | Latvia | 1:22:43 | |
| 15 | Ilya Markov | Russia | 1:23:03 | |
| 16 | Giovanni de Benedictis | Italy | 1:23:14 | SB |
| 17 | Andrey Makarov | Belarus | 1:23:33 | |
| 18 | Costică Bălan | Romania | 1:23:42 | |
| 19 | Jiří Malysa | Czech Republic | 1:24:08 | |
| 20 | David Márquez | Spain | 1:24:36 | |
| 21 | Artur Meleshkevich | Belarus | 1:24:50 | |
| 22 | Satoshi Yanagisawa | Japan | 1:25:03 | |
| 23 | Moussa Aouanouk | Algeria | 1:25:04 | |
| 24 | Arturo Huerta | Canada | 1:25:24 | |
| 25 | Dion Russell | Australia | 1:25:26 | |
| 26 | Tim Berrett | Canada | 1:25:29 | |
| 27 | Daisuke Ikeshima | Japan | 1:25:34 | |
| 28 | Robert Heffernan | Ireland | 1:26:04 | |
| 29 | Sándor Urbanik | Hungary | 1:26:16 | |
| 30 | Shin Il-Yong | South Korea | 1:26:22 | |
| 31 | Igor Kollár | Slovakia | 1:26:31 | |
| 32 | Luis Fernando García | Guatemala | 1:27:16 | |
| 33 | Anthony Gillet | France | 1:27:36 | |
| 34 | Mikhail Khmelnitskiy | Belarus | 1:28:02 | |
| 35 | José David Dominguez | Spain | 1:28:16 | |
| 36 | Hatem Ghoula | Tunisia | 1:28:16 | |
| 37 | Gyula Dudás | Hungary | 1:28:34 | |
| 38 | Valeriy Borisov | Kazakhstan | 1:28:36 | |
| 39 | David Kimutai | Kenya | 1:28:45 | |
| 40 | Timothy Seaman | United States | 1:30:32 | |
| 41 | Róbert Valíček | Slovakia | 1:30:46 | |
| 42 | Julius Sawe | Kenya | 1:30:55 | |
| 43 | Julio René Martínez | Guatemala | 1:31:47 | |
| 44 | Ramy Deeb | Palestine | 1:32:32 | NR |
| — | Efim Motpan | Moldova | DNF | |
| — | Māris Putenis | Latvia | DSQ | |
| — | Bernardo Segura | Mexico | DSQ | |
| — | João Vieira | Portugal | DNS | |

== See also ==
- 2000 Race Walking Year Ranking
