= Alessandro Gandellini =

Italian race walker (born 1973)

Personal information
- Nationality: Italian
- Born: April 30, 1973 (age 53) Monza, Italy
- Height: 1.79 m (5 ft 10 1/2 in)
- Weight: 68 kg (150 lb)

Sport
- Country: Italy
- Sport: Athletics
- Event: Racewalking
- Club: G.S. Fiamme Oro

Achievements and titles
- Personal best: 20 km walk: 1:20.28 (2000)

Alessandro Gandellini (born 30 April 1973) is an Italian former race walker.

== Biography ==
Alessandro Gandellini participated at two editions of the Summer Olympics (2000 and 2004), he has 21 caps in national team from 1996 to 2006. He won five times the national championships at senior level.

== Achievements ==
| Year | Competition | Venue | Position | Notes |
|---|---|---|---|---|
| 1997 | World Championships | Athens, Greece | 12th | 20 km |
| 1997 | World Race Walking Cup | Poděbrady, Czech Republic | 17th | 20 km |
| 1998 | European Championships | Budapest, Hungary | 12th | 20 km |
| 1999 | World Championships | Seville, Spain | 5th | 20 km |
| 1999 | World Race Walking Cup | Mézidon-Canon, France | 8th | 20 km |
| 2000 | Olympic Games | Sydney, Australia | 9th | 20 km |
| 2001 | World Championships | Edmonton, Canada | 12th | 20 km |
| 2001 | Mediterranean Games | Radès, Tunisia | 3rd | 20 km |
| 2002 | European Championships | Munich, Germany | 7th | 20 km |
| 2002 | World Race Walking Cup | Turin, Italy | 7th | 20 km |
| 2003 | European Race Walking Cup | Cheboksary, Russia | 2nd | 20 km |
| 2003 | World Championships | Paris, France | 21st | 20 km |
| 2004 | World Race Walking Cup | Naumburg, Germany | 13th | 20 km |
| 2004 | Olympic Games | Athens, Greece | DNF | 20 km |

== National titles ==
- Italian Indoor Athletics Championships
  - 5000 metres walk: 2000, 2002, 2003, 2004, 2005

== See also ==
- Italian all-time lists - 20 km walk
- Italian team at the running events
- Italy at the IAAF World Race Walking Cup
