= Vladimir Parvatkin =

Russian racewalker

Personal information
- Nationality: Russian
- Born: 10 October 1984 (age 41)

Sport
- Sport: Athletics
- Event: Racewalking

Vladimir Parvatkin (born 10 October 1984) is a Russian racewalker. He competed in the men's 20 kilometres walk at the 2004 Summer Olympics.
