= Eleftherios Thanopoulos =

Greek racewalker

Personal information
- Nationality: Greek
- Born: 22 February 1975 (age 50)

Sport
- Sport: Athletics
- Event: Racewalking

Eleftherios Thanopoulos (born 22 February 1975) is a Greek racewalker. He competed in the men's 20 kilometres walk at the 2004 Summer Olympics.
