= João Vieira (race walker) =

Portuguese racewalker (born 1976)

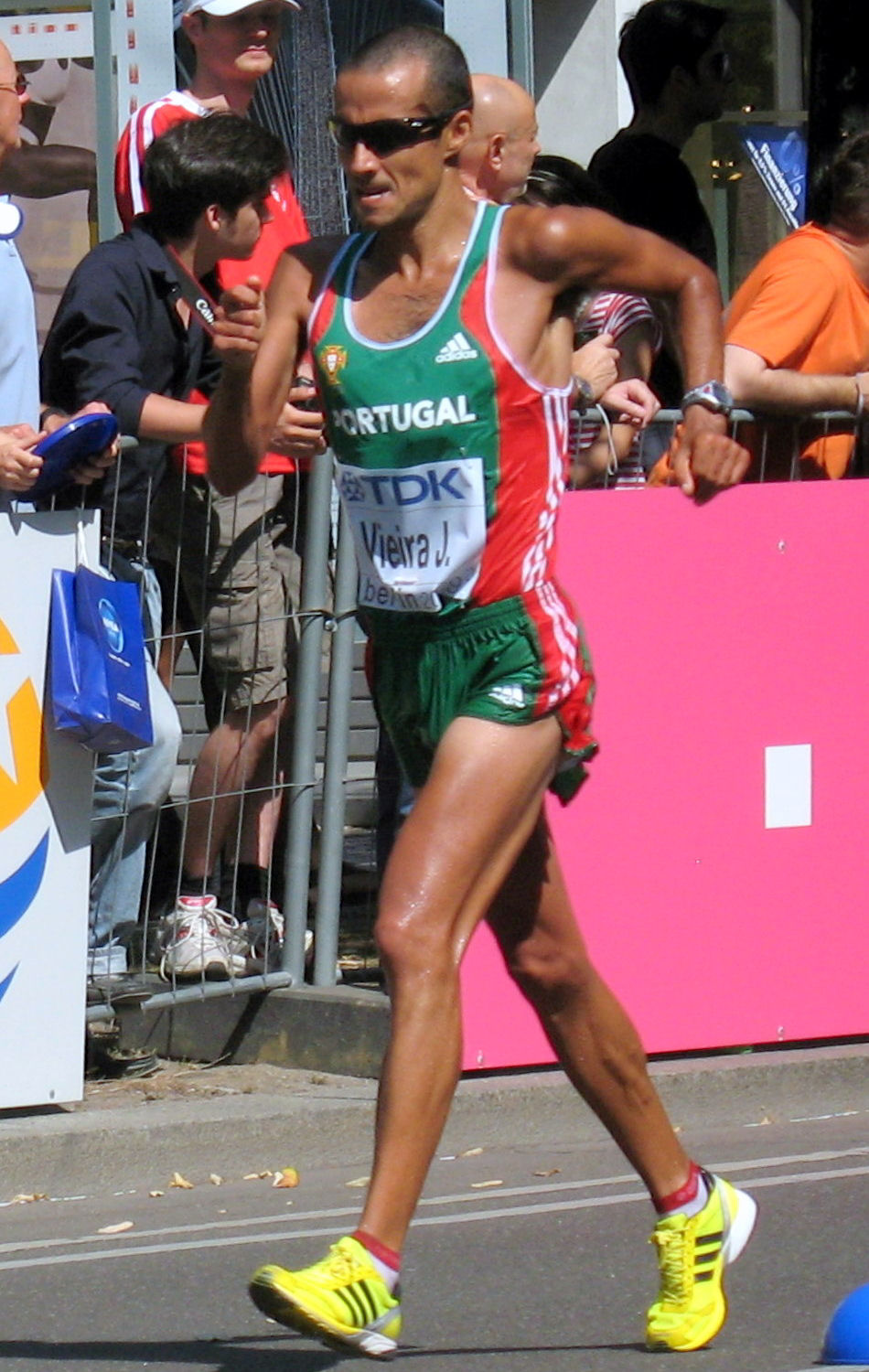
- João Vieira at the World Championships in 2009

Personal information
- Nationality: Portuguese
- Born: 20 February 1976 (age 50) Portimão, Portugal
- Height: 1.75 m (5 ft 9 in)
- Weight: 59 kg (130 lb)

Sport
- Country: Portugal
- Sport: Athletics
- Event: Racewalking
Medal record
Men's athletics
Representing Portugal
World Championships
Silver medal – second place	2019 Doha	50 km walk
Bronze medal – third place	2013 Moscow	20 km walk
European Championships
Silver medal – second place	2010 Barcelona	20 km walk
Bronze medal – third place	2006 Gothenburg	20 km walk

João Paulo Garcia Vieira (born 20 February 1976) is a Portuguese racewalker.

He placed tenth for Portugal at the 2004 Summer Olympics in the 20 km walk and third at the 2006 European Championships. At the 2012 Summer Olympics he finished in 11th in the 20 km walk. He became, at the age of 43 years and 221 days, the oldest medalist ever at the 2019 World Athletics Championships, finishing second at the 50 km race walk. In 2021, he placed 5th at the 2020 Summer Olympics in the men's 50 kilometres walk and set a season best.

His twin brother Sérgio Vieira is a race walker as well.

== Achievements ==
Year	Competition	Venue	Position	Event	Notes
Representing Portugal
1994	World Junior Championships	Lisbon, Portugal	11th	10,000 m	42:26.17
1997	World Race Walking Cup	Poděbrady, Czech Republic	28th	20 km	1:20:59
1997	European U23 Championships	Turku, Finland	—	20 km	DNF
1998	European Championships	Budapest, Hungary	20th	20 km	1:29.38
1999	World Race Walking Cup	Mézidon-Canon, France	21st	20 km	1:24:25
1999	World Championships	Seville, Spain	—	20 km	DSQ
2000	Ibero-American Championships	Rio de Janeiro, Brazil	2nd	20,000 m	1:26:37.78
2000	Olympic Games	Sydney, Australia	—	20 km	DNS
2001	European Race Walking Cup	Dudince, Slovakia	15th	20 km	1:22:52
2001	World Championships	Edmonton, Canada	—	20 km	DSQ
2002	World Race Walking Cup	Turin, Italy	11th	20 km	1:24:13
2002	European Championships	Munich, Germany	12th	20 km	1:21:55
2003	World Championships	Paris, France	17th	20 km	1:22:07
2004	World Race Walking Cup	Naumburg, Germany	17th	20 km	1:21:45
2004	Olympic Games	Athens, Greece	10th	20 km	1:22:19
2005	World Championships	Helsinki, Finland	—	20 km	DNF
2006	World Race Walking Cup	A Coruña, Spain	8th	20 km	1:20:33
2006	European Championships	Gothenburg, Sweden	3rd	20 km	1:20:09
2007	World Championships	Osaka, Japan	25th	20 km	1:27:44
2008	World Race Walking Cup	Cheboksary, Russia	15th	20 km	1:21:13
2008	Olympic Games	Beijing, China	32nd	20 km	1:25:05
2009	European Race Walking Cup	Metz, France	—	20 km	DNF
2009	World Championships	Berlin, Germany	10th	20 km	1:21:43
2010	European Championships	Barcelona, Spain	2nd	20 km	1:20:49
2011	European Race Walking Cup	Olhão, Portugal	—	20 km	DNF
2011	World Championships	Daegu, South Korea	15th	20 km	1:23:26
2012	World Race Walking Cup	Saransk, Russia	19th	20 km	1:22:11
2012	Olympic Games	London, United Kingdom	11th	20 km	1:20:41
2012	Olympic Games	London, United Kingdom	—	50 km	DNF
2013	European Race Walking Cup	Dudince, Slovakia	7th	20 km	1:23:03
2013	World Championships	Moscow, Russia	3rd	20 km	1:22:05
2014	World Race Walking Cup	Taicang, China	—	20 km	DNF
2015	European Race Walking Cup	Murcia, Spain	—	20 km	DNF
2015	World Championships	Beijing, China	36th	20 km	1:25:49
2016	World Race Walking Cup	Rome, Italy	30th	20 km	1:22:39
2016	Olympic Games	Rio de Janeiro, Brazil	—	20 km	DNF
2017	European Race Walking Cup	Poděbrady, Czech Republic	14th	20 km	1:22:42
2017	World Championships	London, United Kingdom	11th	50 km	3:45:28
2021	Olympic Games	Tokyo, Japan	5th	50 km	3:51:28
