= Michal Blažek =

Czech sculptor (1955–2025)

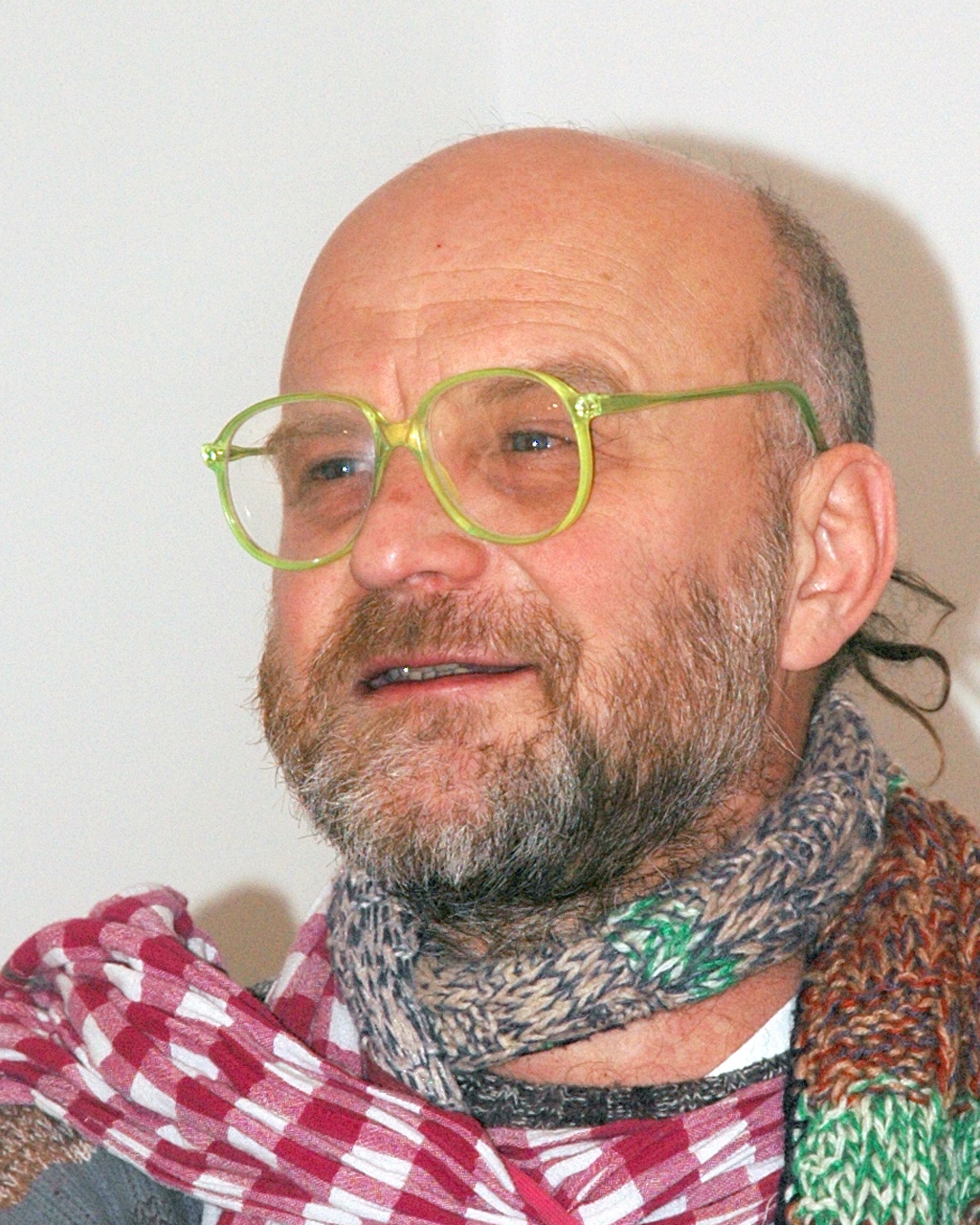
Blažek in 2013

Michal Blažek (19 November 1955 – 2 August 2025) was a Czech sculptor.

== Biography ==
Blažek was born in Prague on 19 November 1955. From 1977 to 1983 he studied monumental sculpture at the Academy of Fine Arts in Prague. In the mid-1980s, he initiated a petition to improve the conditions of young artists and to restore the Youth Gallery. He founded the Artists' Asset and organized lectures in the Prague 1 House of Culture.

From January 1989 he led an independent Prague gallery in the House at Řečický, where a press centre was established four days after 17 November 1989. Under the leadership of Ivan Lamper, it published the Information Service (the predecessor of the Respekt magazine), the Civic Forum, the editorial board of Revolver Revue and Studentské listy. After the revolution, Blažek, together with Petr Kofroň, was the editor-in-chief of the art and music magazine Konserva /Na hudby. The magazine was devoted to the philosophy of art and published articles focused on reflection and art criticism of world art from the 1970s to the 1990s. By 1991, 12 issues had been published.

In 2021, he presented a design for a memorial to a tornado, which destroyed several South Moravian municipalities. A monument made of beams of destroyed roofs, reminiscent of a tornado vortex, was unveiled in 2022.

Blažek died on 2 August 2025, at the age of 69.
