= Aigars Fadejevs =

Latvian athlete (1975–2024)

Personal information
- Born: Aigars Fadejevs; 27 December 1975
- Died: 17 December 2024 (aged 48)

Sport
- Country: Latvia
- Sport: Track and field
- Events: 20 km walk 50 km walk Marathon

Achievements and titles
- Personal bests: 20 km walk: 1:19:36; 50 km walk: 3:43:18; Marathon: 2:18:19
Medal record
Men's athletics
Representing Latvia
Olympic Games
Silver medal – second place	2000 Sydney	50 km walk
European Championships
Silver medal – second place	1998 Budapest	20 km walk
European Race Walking Cup
Bronze medal – third place	1998 Dudince	20 km walk

Aigars Fadejevs (27 December 1975 – 17 December 2024) was a Latvian athlete, competing in 20 km, 50 km walk, and marathon running, and a physiotherapist for sprinters and other athletes. He won a silver medal at the 2000 Summer Olympics in the 50 km race walk, and was named the Latvian Sportsperson of the Year in 2000.

== Biography ==
Aigars Fadejevs was born 27 December 1975 in Valka, Latvia. He was a champion junior race walker, winning the European U23 Championships in 1997.

Fadejevs competed in 1996 Summer Olympics, finishing 6th in the 20 km walk and in the 2000 Summer Olympics, winning the silver medal in 50 km, 2004 Olympics, 50 km 11th, 20 km 9th. He also won a gold medal in the European U23 Championships in 1997, a silver medal in the 1998 European Championships at the 20 km distance, and finished 4th in 50 km at the World Championships in Edmonton in 2001.

Fadejevs holds the unofficial world record of 58:23 in the rare 15 km walk distance.

Fadejevs quit race walking in 2004 and competed as a marathon runner. He almost qualified for the 2008 Olympic Games in Beijing. He worked as a sports therapist, working with Latvian Olympians and international athletes from other disciplines including Kobe Bryant.

In 2017, he revealed in an interview that he had experienced depression and fell into alcoholism at the end of his career, but was working to overcome these challenges.

Fadejevs died suddenly on 17 December 2024, at the age of 48 of unknown causes.

== Achievements ==
Year	Competition	Venue	Position	Event	Notes
Representing Latvia
1994	World Junior Championships	Lisbon, Portugal	—	10,000m	DQ
1994	European Championships	Helsinki, Finland	17th	20 km	1:26.06
1996	Olympic Games	Atlanta, United States	6th	20 km	1:20:47
1997	European U23 Championships	Turku, Finland	1st	20 km	1:19:58
1998	European Race Walking Cup	Dudince, Slovakia	3rd	20 km	1:20:44
1998	European Championships	Budapest, Hungary	2nd	20 km	1:21:25
2000	European Race Walking Cup	Eisenhüttenstadt, Germany	6th	20 km	1:20:18
2000	Olympic Games	Sydney, Australia	14th	20 km	1:22:43
2000	Olympic Games	Sydney, Australia	2nd	50 km	3:43:40
2001	European Race Walking Cup	Dudince, Slovakia	8th	20 km	1:20:51
2001	World Championships	Edmonton, Canada	—	20 km	DNF
2008	Valmiera Marathon	Valmiera, Latvia	1st	Marathon	2:19:57

== Sources ==
- Evans, Hilary; Gjerde, Arild; Heijmans, Jeroen; Mallon, Bill; et al. "Aigars Fadejevs". Olympics at Sports-Reference.com. Sports Reference LLC. Archived from the original on 17 April 2020.
