= André Höhne =

German racewalker

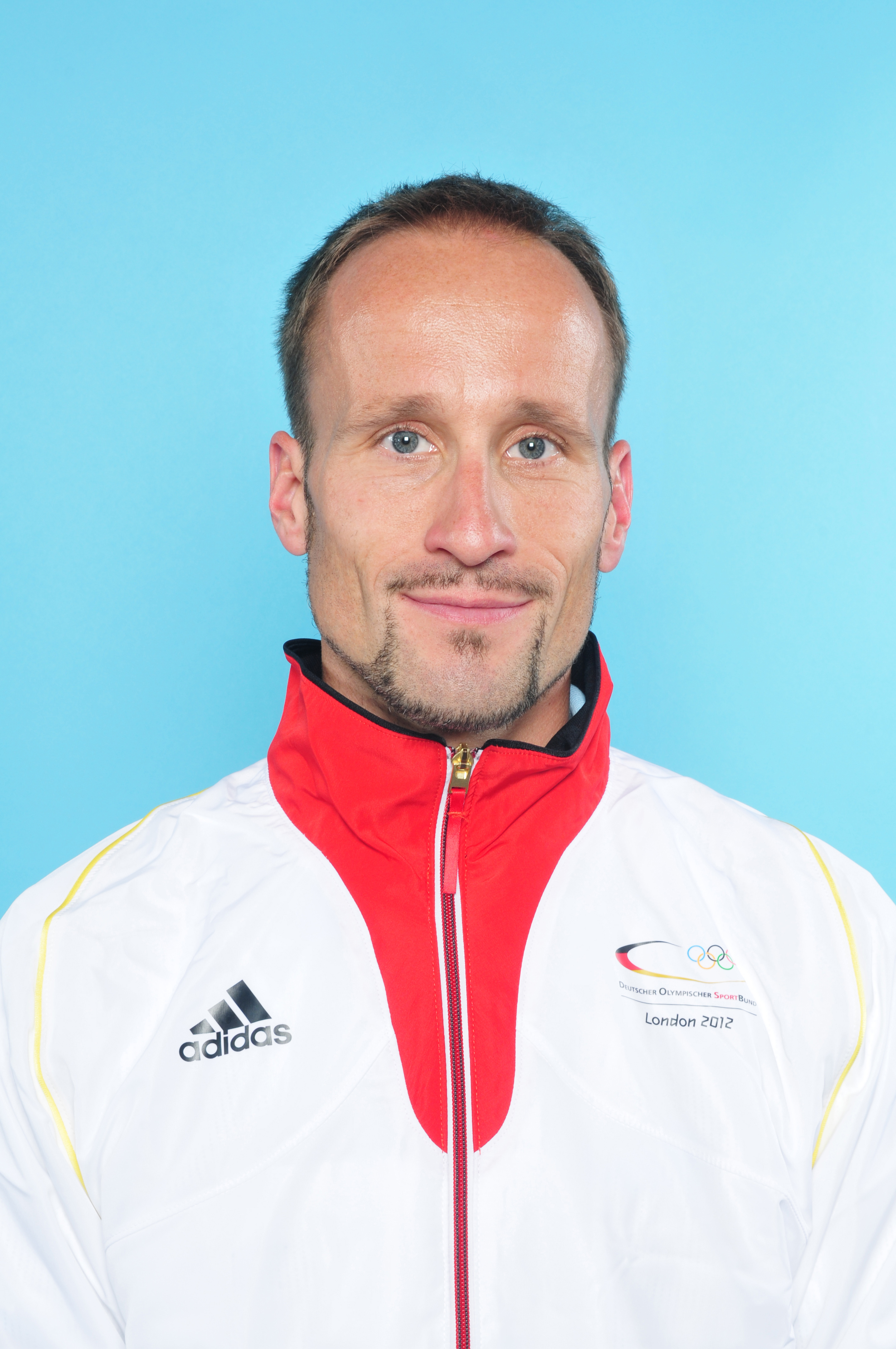
- Höhne in 2012

Personal information
- Born: 10 March 1978 (age 48) Berlin, East Germany
- Height: 1.85 m (6 ft 1 in)
- Weight: 72 kg (159 lb)

Sport
- Country: Germany
- Sport: Athletics
- Event: 50km Race Walk

André Höhne (born 10 March 1978) is a German race walker.

He finished 14th in the 20 kilometres walk at the 2009 World Championships in Athletics, crossing the line with a time of 1:21:59.

== Achievements ==
Year	Competition	Venue	Position	Event	Notes
Representing Germany
1997	World Race Walking Cup	Poděbrady, Czech Republic	102nd	20 km	1:31:07
1997	European Junior Championships	Ljubljana, Slovenia	2nd	10,000 m	43:00.71
1998	European Championships	Budapest, Hungary	23rd	20 km	1:32.28
1999	World Race Walking Cup	Mézidon-Canon, France	26th	20 km	1:25:51
1999	European U23 Championships	Gothenburg, Sweden	12th	20 km	1:31:38
2001	World Championships	Edmonton, Canada	—	20 km	DNF
2002	European Championships	Munich, Germany	11th	20 km	1:21:38
2002	World Race Walking Cup	Turin, Italy	24th	20 km	1:27:17
2003	World Championships	Paris, France	13th	20 km	1:20:44
2004	World Race Walking Cup	Naumburg, Germany	15th	20 km	1:21:27
2004	Olympic Games	Athens, Greece	8th	20 km	1:21:56
2004	Olympic Games	Athens, Greece	—	50 km	DNF
2005	World Championships	Helsinki, Finland	4th	20 km	1:20:00
2006	World Race Walking Cup	A Coruña, Spain	16th	20 km	1:21:52
2006	European Championships	Gothenburg, Sweden	11th	20 km	1:24:35
2007	World Championships	Osaka, Japan	—	20 km	DNF
2008	World Race Walking Cup	Cheboksary, Russia	7th	50 km	3:49:03
2008	Olympic Games	Beijing, China	25th	20 km	1:23:13
2008	Olympic Games	Beijing, China	12th	50 km	3:49:52
2009	European Race Walking Cup	Metz, France	—	20 km	DQ
2009	World Championships	Berlin, Germany	14th	20 km	1:21:59
2009	World Championships	Berlin, Germany	5th	50 km	3:43:19
2010	European Championships	Barcelona, Spain	7th	50 km	3:49:29
2011	European Race Walking Cup	Olhão, Portugal	—	20 km	DNF
2012	World Race Walking Cup	Saransk, Russia	—	50 km	DNF
2012	Olympic Games	London, United Kingdom	21st	20 km	1:22:02
2012	Olympic Games	London, United Kingdom	10th	50 km	3:44:26
