= Tim Seaman =

American racewalker (born 1972)

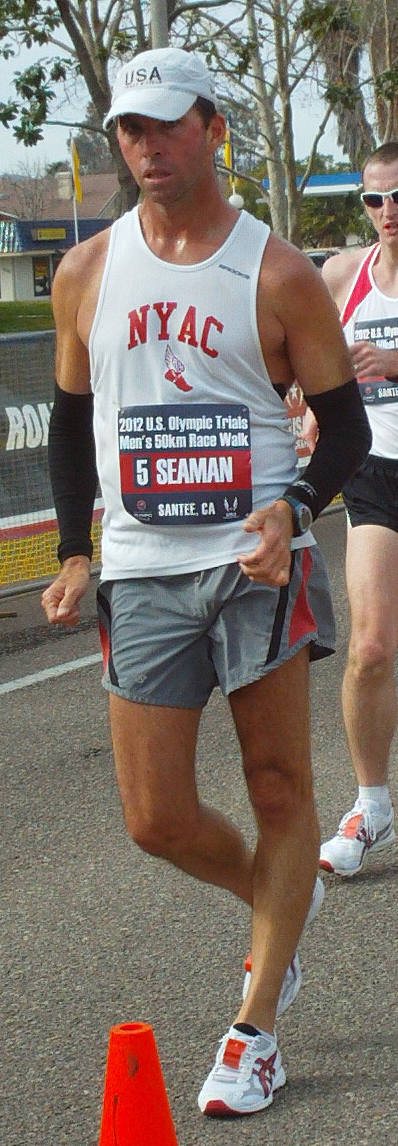
- Seaman at the 2012 US Olympic Trials 50 km racewalk in Santee, California

Personal information
- Full name: Timothy M. Seaman
- Born: May 14, 1972 (age 54) North Kingstown, Rhode Island, U.S.
- Education: University of Wisconsin-Parkside (four-time NAIA race walk champion)
- Height: 1.68 m (5 ft 6 in)
- Weight: 64 kg (141 lb)

Sport
- Sport: Race walking
- Club: New York Athletic Club

Achievements and titles
- Olympic finals: 2000, 2004

Timothy "Tim" M. Seaman (born May 14, 1972) is an American race walker who competed at the 2000 and 2004 Olympics.

Seaman made a habit of winning the 5000 metres racewalk at the USA Indoor Track and Field Championships. He won the event 13-times winning consecutive years from 1998 to 2007, and in 2009, 2010 and 2013. His 13 USA Indoor titles rank highest in the sport's history. Seaman is also seven-time USA 20 km champion, winning in 1998, 2000, 2002, 2004, 2005, 2009 and 2014. On April 20, 2004, he set the still standing American record in the 10-km walk at 39:22.7 in Storetveitmarsje, Norway. As a collegiate athlete, Seaman was a four-time National Association of Intercollegiate Athletics (NAIA) race walk champion while competing for the University of Wisconsin-Parkside.

Seaman is currently the cross country, women's track and field and distance running coach for Cuyamaca College. His wife Rachel Seaman is also an Olympic racewalker.

== Achievements ==
| Year | Competition | Venue | Position | Event | Notes |
Representing the United States
| 1999 | World Championships | Seville, Spain | 24th | 20 km | |
| 2000 | Olympic Games | Sydney, Australia | 40th | 20 km | |
| 2001 | World Championships | Edmonton, Canada | — | 20 km | DSQ |
| 2003 | Pan American Games | Santo Domingo, Dominican Republic | 7th | 20 km | |
| 2004 | Olympic Games | Athens, Greece | 20th | 20 km | |
| 2005 | World Championships | Helsinki, Finland | 31st | 20 km | |
| 2007 | World Championships | Osaka, Japan | 31st | 20 km | |
| 2010 | US National Championships | Des Moines, United States | 2nd | 20 km | |

== See also ==
- World Fit
