= Ilya Markov =

Russian race walker

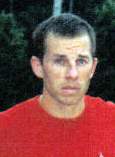

Personal information
- Born: 19 June 1972 (age 54) Asbest, Russian SFSR, Soviet Union

Sport
- Sport: Race walking
Medal record
Representing Russia
Olympic Games
Silver medal – second place	1996 Atlanta	20 km walk
World Championships
Gold medal – first place	1999 Seville	20 km walk
Silver medal – second place	2001 Edmonton	20 km walk
European Championships
Gold medal – first place	1998 Budapest	20 km walk
Summer Universiade
Gold medal – first place	1997 Catania	20 km walk

Ilya Vladislavovich Markov (Russian: Илья Владиславович Марков, born 19 June 1972) is a Russian race walker.

== Achievements ==
Year	Competition	Venue	Position	Event	Notes
Representing Soviet Union
1990	World Junior Championships	Plovdiv, Bulgaria	1st	10,000 m	39:55.52
Representing Russia
1994	European Championships	Helsinki, Finland	18th	20 km	1:26:53
1995	World Championships	Gothenburg, Sweden	4th	20 km	1:21:28
1996	Olympic Games	Atlanta, United States	2nd	20 km	1:20:16
1997	World Race Walking Cup	Poděbrady, Czech Republic	3rd	20 km	1:18:30
1997	Universiade	Catania, Italy	1st	20 km	1:25:36
1998	European Championships	Budapest, Hungary	1st	20 km	1:21:10
1999	World Championships	Seville, Spain	1st	20 km	1:23:34
1999	World Race Walking Cup	Mézidon-Canon, France	7th	20 km	1:21:42
2000	Olympic Games	Sydney, Australia	15th	20 km	1:23:03
2001	World Championships	Edmonton, Canada	2nd	20 km	1:20:33
2003	World Championships	Paris, France	8th	20 km	1:20:14
2005	European Race Walking Cup	Miskolc, Hungary	1st	20 km	1:20:50
2005	World Championships	Helsinki, Finland	—	20 km	DQ
2007	World Championships	Osaka, Japan	9th	20 km	1:24:35
2008	Olympic Games	Beijing, China	17th	20 km	1:22:02
