= Gintaras Andriuškevičius =

Lithuanian racewalker (born 1975)

Personal information
- Full name: Gintaras Andriuškevičius
- Nationality: Lithuania
- Born: 6 July 1975 (age 51) Alytus, Lithuanian SSR, Soviet Union
- Height: 1.76 m (5 ft 9 1/2 in)
- Weight: 62 kg (137 lb)

Sport
- Sport: Athletics
- Event: Racewalking
- Club: Daisotra

Achievements and titles
- Personal best: 20 km walk: 1:22:10 (2001)

Gintaras Andriuškevičius (born 6 July 1975 in Alytus) is a retired Lithuanian race walker. He represented his nation Lithuania at the 2004 Summer Olympics, and also recorded a personal best of 1:22:10 in the men's 20 km race walk upon placing first at the 2001 Lithuanian Cup in Prienai.

Andriuskevicius qualified for the men's 20 km race walk at the 2004 Summer Olympics in Athens, by registering a B-standard entry time of 1:24:29 from A. Milkeno Racewalk Competition in Birštonas. He finished twenty-eighth in a vast field of 47 race walkers with a time of 1:27:56, just three seconds slower from his entry standard.
