= European Race Walking Team Championships =

Race walking event started in 1996

- Status: Active
- Genre: Racewalking competitions
- Date: April
- Frequency: Biennial
- Location: Various
- Inaugurated: 1996
- Organiser: EAA

The European Race Walking Team Championships (European Race Walking Cup until 2021) is a race walking event established in 1996, and organised by the European Athletic Association. In 1996, the team scores were calculated by aggregating the points (based on position in race) awarded to the first three finishers. From 1998, team scores were calculated by aggregating the positions of the first three finishers (seniors) or two finishers (juniors).

== Championships ==
Edition	Year	Host city	Host country	Date	Events
1	1996	A Coruña	Spain	20 April 1996	7
2	1998	Dudince	Slovakia	25 April 1998	7
3	2000	Eisenhüttenstadt	Germany	17–18 June 2000	10
4	2001	Dudince	Slovakia	19 May 2001	10
5	2003	Cheboksary	Russia	17–18 May 2003	10
6	2005	Miskolc	Hungary	21 May 2005	10
7	2007	Royal Leamington Spa	United Kingdom	20 May 2007	10
8	2009	Metz	France	24 May 2009	10
9	2011	Olhão	Portugal	22 May 2011	10
10	2013	Dudince	Slovakia	19 May 2013	10
11	2015	Murcia	Spain	17 May 2015	10
12	2017	Poděbrady	Czech Republic	21 May 2017	10
13	2019	Alytus	Lithuania	19 May 2019	12
14	2021	Poděbrady	Czech Republic	16 May 2021	12
15	2023	Poděbrady	Czech Republic	21 May 2023	12
16	2025	Poděbrady	Czech Republic	18 May 2025	12
17	2027	Serres	Greece	16 May 2027	12

== Men individual ==
=== 20 km ===
Year	Gold	Silver	Bronze
1996	Robert Korzeniowski (POL)	Daniel Plaza (ESP)	Fernando Vázquez (ESP)
1998	Francisco Fernández (ESP)	Robert Korzeniowski (POL)	Aigars Fadejevs (LAT)
2000	Robert Korzeniowski (POL)	Andreas Erm (GER)	Francisco Fernández (ESP)
2001	Viktor Burayev (RUS)	Yevgeniy Misyulya (BLR)	Andreas Erm (GER)
2003	Francisco Fernández (ESP)	Alessandro Gandellini (ITA)	Vladimir Andreyev (RUS)
2005	Ilya Markov (RUS)	Juan Manuel Molina (ESP)	Vladimir Stankin (RUS)
2007	Yohann Diniz (FRA)	Ivano Brugnetti (ITA)	Igor Yerokhin (RUS)
2009	Giorgio Rubino (ITA)	Ivano Brugnetti (ITA)	Jean-Jacques Nkouloukidi (ITA)
2011	Matej Tóth (SVK)	Jakub Jelonek (POL)	Benjamín Sánchez (ESP)
2013	Denis Strelkov (RUS)	Miguel Ángel López (ESP)	Matej Tóth (SVK)
2015	Miguel Ángel López (ESP)	Matej Tóth (SVK)	Yohann Diniz (FRA)
2017	Christopher Linke (GER)	Miguel Ángel López (ESP)	Perseus Karlström (SWE)
2019	Perseus Karlström (SWE)	Vasiliy Mizinov (ANA)	Diego García (ESP)
2021	Perseus Karlström (SWE)	Álvaro Martín (ESP)	Diego García (ESP)

=== 50 km ===
Year	Gold	Silver	Bronze
1996	Jesús Ángel García (ESP)	Arturo Di Mezza (ITA)	Stanislaw Stosik (POL)
1998	Tomasz Lipiec (POL)	Jesús Ángel García (ESP)	Giovanni Perricelli (ITA)
2000	Jesús Ángel García (ESP)	Yevgeniy Shmalyuk (RUS)	Denis Langlois (FRA)
2001	Jesús Ángel García (ESP)	Nikolay Matyukhin (RUS)	Vladimir Potemin (RUS)
2003	German Skurygin (RUS)	Aleksey Voyevodin (RUS)	Semyon Lovkin (RUS)
2005	Aleksey Voyevodin (RUS)	Sergey Kirdyapkin (RUS)	Yuriy Andronov (RUS)
2007	Vladimir Kanaykin (RUS)	Trond Nymark (NOR)	Oleg Kistkin (RUS)
2009	Denis Nizhegorodov (RUS)	Jesús Ángel García (ESP)	Yuriy Andronov (RUS)
2011	Denis Nizhegorodov (RUS)	Marco De Luca (ITA)	Christopher Linke (GER)
2013	Yohann Diniz (FRA)	Mikhail Ryzhov (RUS)	Ivan Noskov (RUS)
2015	Mikhail Ryzhov (RUS)	Ivan Noskov (RUS)	Marco De Luca (ITA)
2017	Ivan Banzeruk (UKR)	Ihor Hlavan (UKR)	Michele Antonelli (ITA)
2019	Yohann Diniz (FRA)	Dzmitry Dziubin (BLR)	João Vieira (POR)
2021	Marc Tur (ESP)	Aleksi Ojala (FIN)	Andrea Agrusti (ITA)

== Women individual ==
=== 20 km ===
Year	Gold	Silver	Bronze
2000	Olimpiada Ivanova (RUS)	Elisabetta Perrone (ITA)	Kjersti Plätzer (NOR)
2001	Olimpiada Ivanova (RUS)	Natalya Fedoskina (RUS)	Elisabetta Perrone (ITA)
2003	Yelena Nikolayeva (RUS)	Elisabetta Perrone (ITA)	María Vasco (ESP)
2005	Olimpiada Ivanova (RUS)	Susana Feitor (POR)	Elisa Rigaudo (ITA)
2007	Ryta Turava (BLR)	Olga Kaniskina (RUS)	Elena Ginko (BLR)
2009	María Vasco (ESP)	Anisya Kirdyapkina (RUS)	Kristina Saltanovič (LTU)
2011	Vera Sokolova (RUS)	Anisya Kirdyapkina (RUS)	Elisa Rigaudo (ITA)
2013	Anisya Kirdyapkina (RUS)	Vera Sokolova (RUS)	Marina Pandakova (RUS)
2015	Elmira Alembekova (RUS)	Eleonora Giorgi (ITA)	Svetlana Vasilyeva (RUS)
2017	Antonella Palmisano (ITA)	Ana Cabecinha (POR)	Laura García-Caro (ESP)
2019	Živilė Vaiciukevičiūtė (LTU)	Laura García-Caro (ESP)	Raquel González (ESP)
2021	Antonella Palmisano (ITA)	María Pérez (ESP)	Laura García-Caro (ESP)

=== 35 km ===
Year	Gold	Silver	Bronze
2021	Antigoni Drisbioti (GRE)	Eleonora Giorgi (ITA)	Lidia Barcella (ITA)

=== Defunct events ===
==== 10 km ====
Year	Gold	Silver	Bronze
1996	Annarita Sidoti (ITA)	Rossella Giordano (ITA)	Susana Feitor (POR)
1998	Nadezhda Ryashkina (RUS)	Mária Urbanik (HUN)	Claudia Iovan (ROM)

==== 50 km ====
Year	Gold	Silver	Bronze
2019	Eleonora Giorgi (ITA)	Júlia Takács (ESP)	Inês Henriques (POR)

== Men teams ==
=== 20 km ===
Year	Gold	Silver	Bronze
1996	Spain	Russia	Italy
1998	Belarus	Spain	Germany
2000	Spain	Poland	Germany
2001	Russia	Spain	Italy
2003	Spain	Russia	Italy
2005	Russia	Spain	Ukraine
2007	Belarus	Italy	Spain
2009	Italy	Spain	Poland
2011	Spain	Italy	France
2013	Russia	Ukraine	Poland
2015	Germany	Russia	Ukraine
2017	Spain	Germany	Ireland
2019	Spain	United Kingdom	Ukraine
2021	Italy	Germany	Ukraine

=== 50 km ===
Year	Gold	Silver	Bronze
1996	Spain	Italy	Russia
1998	Spain	Italy	Slovakia
2000	France	Spain	Germany
2001	Russia	Spain	France
2003	Russia	Spain	Portugal
2005	Russia	France	Italy
2007	Russia	Spain	France
2009	Russia	Spain	Italy
2011	Italy	Poland	Spain
2013	Russia	Ukraine	Poland
2015	Russia	Italy	Ukraine
2017	Ukraine	Italy	Spain
2019	Ukraine	Spain	Belarus
2021	Italy	Germany	Ukraine

== Women team ==
=== 20 km ===
Year	Gold	Silver	Bronze
1998	Russia	Italy	Spain
2000	Italy	Romania	Ukraine
2001	Russia	Italy	Belarus
2003	Italy	Spain	Russia
2005	Portugal	Italy	Romania
2007	Belarus	Russia	Spain
2009	Russia	Spain	Slovakia
2011	Russia	Spain	Ukraine
2013	Russia	Portugal	Spain
2015	Russia	Italy	Portugal
2017	Spain	Italy	Lithuania
2017	Spain	Italy	Belarus
2021	Spain	Ukraine	Italy

=== 35 km ===
Year	Gold	Silver	Bronze
2021	Italy	Greece	Belarus

=== Defunct events ===
==== 10 km ====
Year	Gold	Silver	Bronze
1996	Italy	Russia	Belarus

==== 50 km ====
Year	Gold	Silver	Bronze
1996	Ukraine	Spain	Italy

== Medals (1996-2023) ==
All events:

Rank	Nation	Gold	Silver	Bronze	Total
1	Russia	61	26	20	107
2	Spain	33	34	23	90
3	Italy	20	32	22	74
4	Ukraine	7	5	11	23
5	Belarus	6	12	13	31
6	France	4	8	11	23
7	Germany	4	7	18	29
8	Poland	3	5	7	15
9	Portugal	2	4	6	12
10	Turkey	2	3	3	8
11	Greece	2	2	1	5
12	Sweden	2	1	1	4
13	Czech Republic	1	2	1	4
14	Slovakia	1	1	3	5
15	Authorised Neutral Athletes	1	1	0	2
16	Lithuania	1	0	2	3
17	Romania	0	3	3	6
18	Finland	0	1	1	2
18	Norway	0	1	1	2
20	Great Britain	0	1	0	1
20	Hungary	0	1	0	1
22	Ireland	0	0	2	2
23	Latvia	0	0	1	1
Totals (23 entries)		150	150	150	450

=== Overall (senior men and women) ===
Update to 2021 and including junior events.

Rank	Nation	Gold	Silver	Bronze	Total
1	Russia	63	27	20	110
2	Spain	25	32	20	77
3	Italy	15	26	21	62
4	Belarus	6	11	13	30
5	Ukraine	6	4	9	19
6	France	4	8	8	20
7	Germany	4	6	14	24
8	Poland	3	5	7	15
9	Turkey	3	2	3	8
10	Sweden	2	0	1	3
11	Portugal	1	4	5	10
12	Czech Republic	1	2	1	4
12	Greece	1	2	1	4
14	Slovakia	1	1	3	5
15	Lithuania	1	0	1	2
16	Romania	0	3	3	6
17	Finland	0	1	1	2
17	Norway	0	1	1	2
19	Great Britain	0	1	0	1
19	Hungary	0	1	0	1
21	Ireland	0	0	2	2
22	Latvia	0	0	1	1
Totals (22 entries)		136	137	135	408

=== Men team 20 km ===
Update to 2017.

Rank	Nation	Gold	Silver	Bronze	Total
1	Spain	5	4	1	10
2	Russia	3	3	0	6
3	Belarus	2	0	0	2
4	Italy	1	2	3	6
5	Germany	1	1	2	4
6	Poland	0	1	2	3
6	Ukraine	0	1	2	3
8	France	0	0	1	1
8	Ireland	0	0	1	1
Totals (9 entries)		12	12	12	36

=== Men team 50 km ===
Update to 2017.

Rank	Nation	Gold	Silver	Bronze	Total
1	Russia	7	0	1	8
2	Spain	2	5	2	9
3	Italy	1	4	2	7
4	France	1	1	2	4
5	Ukraine	1	1	1	3
6	Poland	0	1	1	2
7	Germany	0	0	1	1
7	Portugal	0	0	1	1
7	Slovakia	0	0	1	1
Totals (9 entries)		12	12	12	36

=== Women team ===
Update to 2017.

Rank	Nation	Gold	Silver	Bronze	Total
1	Russia	6	2	1	9
2	Italy	3	5	0	8
3	Spain	1	3	3	7
4	Portugal	1	1	1	3
5	Belarus	1	0	2	3
6	Romania	0	1	1	2
7	Ukraine	0	0	2	2
8	Lithuania	0	0	1	1
8	Slovakia	0	0	1	1
Totals (9 entries)		12	12	12	36

== List of Records of the European Race Walking Cup ==
=== Men ===
Event	Record	Athlete	Nationality	Date	Meet	Place	Ref.
20 km	1:18:29	Robert Korzeniowski	Poland	17 June 2000	2000 Cup	Eisenhüttenstadt, Germany	
50 km	3:37:43	Yohann Diniz	France	19 May 2019	2019 Cup	Alytus, Lithuania	
10 km (Junior Event)	39:57	Andrey Ruzavin	Russia	21 May 2005	2005 Cup	Miskolc, Hungary	

=== Women ===
Event	Record	Athlete	Nationality	Date	Meet	Place	Ref.
20 km	1:26:15	Elmira Alembekova	Russia	17 May 2015	2015 Cup	Murcia, Spain	
50 km	4:04:50	Eleonora Giorgi	Italy	19 May 2019	2019 Cup	Alytus, Lithuania	
10 km (Junior Event)	43:10	Yelena Lashmanova	Russia	21 May 2011	2011 Cup	Olhão, Portugal	

=== Records in defunct events ===
==== Women's events ====
Event	Record	Athlete	Nationality	Date	Meet	Place	Ref.
10 km	43:06	Nadezhda Ryashkina	Russia	25 April 1998	1998 Cup	Dudince, Slovakia	
