= 1990 South American Junior Championships in Athletics =

XXII South American Junior Championships in Athletics
- Dates: July 13–15
- Host city: Bogotá, Colombia
- Venue: Estadio El Campín
- Level: Junior
- Events: 40
- Participation: about 250 athletes from 10 nations

The 22nd South American Junior Championships in Athletics were held in Bogotá, Colombia, at the Estadio El Campín from July 13–15, 1990.

== Participation (unofficial) ==
Detailed result lists can be found on the "World Junior Athletics History" website. An unofficial count yields the number of about 250 athletes from about 10 countries: Argentina (20), Bolivia (3), Brazil (54), Chile (22), Colombia (50), Ecuador (40), Panama (10), Paraguay (2), Peru (15), Venezuela (34).

== Medal summary ==
Medal winners are published for men and women Complete results can be found on the "World Junior Athletics History" website.

=== Men ===
Event	Gold		Silver		Bronze	
100 metres	Edgar Chourio (VEN)	10.2A	Reinaldo Santana (VEN)	10.3A	Saulo dos Santos (BRA)	10.4A
200 metres	Nilton Messias (BRA)	20.96A	Edgar Chourio (VEN)	21.03A	Reinaldo Santana (VEN)	21.49A
400 metres	Inaldo Sena (BRA)	46.89A	Nilton Messias (BRA)	47.04A	Guillermo Cacián (ARG)	48.03A
800 metres	Edgardo Graglia (ARG)	1:53.10A	Omar Best (VEN)	1:53.75A	Carlos Pinzón (COL)	1:55.8A
1500 metres	José Rodrigues (BRA)	4:01.1A	William Roldán (COL)	4:05.0A	Carlos Roldán (COL)	4:08.3A
5000 metres	William Roldán (COL)	15:26.00A	José Ramírez (COL)	15:53.27A	Emerson Vettori (BRA)	15:59.27A
10,000 metres	Robinson Semolini (BRA)	31:04A	José Ramírez (COL)	31:11A	Leonel Medina (VEN)	31:42A
110 metres hurdles	Eliexer Pulgar (VEN)	14.20A	Marco Mina (PER)	14.56A	Federico Ifill (VEN)	14.57A
400 metres hurdles	Luis Guerra (VEN)	53.97A	Nicolás Majluf (CHI)	54.52A	Luis Gómez (VEN)	55.04A
2000 metres steeplechase	Emerson Vettori (BRA)	6:15.12A	Jaime Cáceras (PER)	6:18.30A	Diego Toro (COL)	6:25.0A
4 × 100 metres relay	Venezuela; Edgardo Arrieta; Edgar Chourio; Eliecer Pulgar; Reinaldo Santana	41.10A	Brazil; Francisco Ravisio; Paulo Bosso; Marlon Borges; Nilton Messias	41.37A	Colombia; Marín; Alberto Quintero; Luis Vega; Rodolfo Rodríguez	42.00A
4 × 400 metres relay	Brazil; Rogério Roque; Inaldo de Sena; Benjamin Azevedo; Nilton Messias	3:11.50A	Venezuela; Frank Caguao; Pedro Dorantes; Omar Best; Luis Guerra	3:15.59A	Argentina; Cristian Elseser; Miguel Pérez; Edgardo Graglia; Guillermo Cacián	3:16.37A
10,000 metres track walk	Jefferson Pérez (ECU)	42:57.95A	Jaime Rodríguez (COL)	47:06.00A	Mauricio Cárdenas (ECU)	47:16.25A
High jump	José Luis Bruno (ARG)	2.10A	Jairo Venâncio (BRA)	2.07A	Lewis Asprilla (COL)	2.01A
Pole vault	Eduardo Diez (VEN)	4.50A	Marlon Borges (BRA)	4.50A	Diego Vázquez (ARG)	4.40A
Long jump	Nelson Ferreira (BRA)	7.18A	Jefferson Ilário (BRA)	7.13A	Oscar Acosta (COL)	7.10A
Triple jump	Jairo Venâncio (BRA)	15.94A	Oscar Valiente (PER)	15.56A	Oscar Acosta (COL)	14.72A
Shot put	Yojer Medina (VEN)	15.50A	Luís Fernandes (BRA)	13.95A	Luís Maiorquim (BRA)	12.90A
Discus throw	Yojer Medina (VEN)	47.28A	Gerson Pereira (BRA)	46.26A	Luís Fernandes (BRA)	44.34A
Hammer throw	Héctor Bontempi (ARG)	53.30A	Hugo Scévola (ARG)	48.34A	Luís Maiorquim (BRA)	46.80A
Javelin throw	Pedro Claure (CHI)	62.76A	Pablo Frutos (CHI)	62.28A	Luis Pérez (VEN)	62.08A
Decathlon	Alcides Silva (BRA)	6600A	Paulo Martins (BRA)	6591A	Eladio Farfán (VEN)	6024A

=== Women ===
Event	Gold		Silver		Bronze	
100 metres	Berenice Ferreira (BRA)	11.8A	Tânia da Silva (BRA)	11.9A	Lisette Rondón (CHI)	12.0A
200 metres	Rosa Magaly Segovia (COL)	24.02A	Denise Sharpe (ARG)	24.18A	Claudete Alves Pina (BRA)	24.21A
400 metres	Luciana Mendes (BRA)	54.85A	Claudete Alves Pina (BRA)	55.13A	Rosa Magaly Segovia (COL)	56.15A
800 metres	Fátima dos Santos (BRA)	2:11.55A	Janeth Caizalitín (ECU)	2:12.22A	Idalia Belo (BRA)	2:18.0A
1500 metres	Janeth Caizalitín (ECU)	4:42.7A	Rosa Mila Ibarra (COL)	4:46.5A	Marina Nascimento (BRA)	4:50.1A
3000 metres	Rosa Mila Ibarra (COL)	10:13.12A	Janeth Caizalitín (ECU)	10:16.11A	Marina Nascimento (BRA)	10:46.04A
10,000 metres	Sandra Ruales (ECU)	37:09.5A	Soledad Nieto (ECU)	38:37.4A	Ana de Oliveira (BRA)	39:32.6A
100 metres hurdles	Michelle Openshaw (PER)	14.80A	Antonina Santângelo (BRA)	14.83A	Nicole Tulier (CHI)	15.16A
400 metres hurdles	Sandra Izquierdo (ARG)	60.83A	Maria Dória (BRA)	61.14A	Lucimara Machado (BRA)	62.04A
4 × 100 metres relay	Brazil; Tânia da Silva; Norma Aparecida; Antonina Santangelo; Claudete Alves Pina	47.07A	Colombia; Liset Valois; Rosa Magaly Segovia; Sandra Borrero; Gladys Colorado	47.24A	Chile; Andrea Hoelzel; Loreto Arellano; Lisette Rondón; Hannelore Grosser	47.27A
4 × 400 metres relay	Brazil; Maria Dória; Lucimara Machado; Fatima dos Santos; Luciana Mendes	3:45.12A	Colombia; Flor Robledo; Janeth Lucumí; Silva; Rosa Magaly Segovia	3:53.21A	Venezuela; Yosira Sequera; Naile González; Paula Yáñez; Josefa Castro	3:58.12A
5000 metres track walk	Miriam Ramón (ECU)	24:11.6A	Luisa Nivicela (ECU)	25:42.4A	Cristina Bohórquez (COL)	26:14.4A
High jump	Cintia Lais Matedi (BRA)	1.68A	Alejandra García (ARG)	1.65A	Yanelis Barreto (VEN)	1.60A
Long jump	Maria de Souza (BRA)	6.17A	Tânia da Silva (BRA)	5.91A	Audrey González (VEN)	5.63A
Shot put	Elisângela Adriano (BRA)	16.06A	Alexandra Amaro (BRA)	13.83A	Sadith Fretes (PAR)	11.69A
Discus throw	Elisângela Adriano (BRA)	48.18A	Alexandra Amaro (BRA)	44.40A	Sadith Fretes (PAR)	39.48A
Javelin throw	Yamelis Marín (VEN)	43.26A	Martha Rodríguez (VEN)	42.34A	Maria Socorro (BRA)	40.84A
Heptathlon	Euzinete dos Reis (BRA)	4948A	Alejandra García (ARG)	4650A	Ângela Gonçalves (BRA)	4276A

== Medal table (unofficial) ==
* Host nation (Colombia)

Rank	Nation	Gold	Silver	Bronze	Total
1	Brazil	19	15	13	47
2	Venezuela	8	5	9	22
3	Argentina	4	4	3	11
4	Ecuador	4	4	1	9
5	Colombia*	3	7	9	19
6	Peru	1	3	0	4
7	Chile	1	2	3	6
8	Paraguay	0	0	2	2
Totals (8 entries)		40	40	40	120
