= Miloš Bátovský =

Slovak racewalker

Miloš Bátovský (born 26 May 1979 in Krupina) is a former Slovak race walker. He competed in the 50 kilometres walk event at the 2004, 2008 and 2012 Summer Olympics.

== Competition record ==
Year	Competition	Venue	Position	Event	Notes
Representing Slovakia
1998	World Junior Championships	Annecy, France	17th	10,000 m walk	46:08.36
1999	World Race Walking Cup	Mézidon-Canon, France	80th	20 km walk	1:34:28
1999	European U23 Championships	Gothenburg, Sweden	—	20 km walk	DQ
2001	European U23 Championships	Amsterdam, Netherlands	7th	20 km walk	1:24:02
2001	Universiade	Beijing, China	11th	20 km walk	1:29:43
2002	World Race Walking Cup	Turin, Italy	27th	20 km walk	1:27:38
2003	Universiade	Daegu, South Korea	14th	20 km walk	1:29:43
2004	World Race Walking Cup	Naumburg, Germany	43rd	20 km walk	1:25:23
2004	Olympic Games	Athens, Greece	18th	50 km walk	3:59:11
2005	European Race Walking Cup	Miskolc, Hungary	9th	50 km walk	3:54:49
2005	World Championships	Helsinki, Finland	18th	50 km walk	4:05:44
2007	European Race Walking Cup	Royal Leamington Spa, United Kingdom	33rd	20 km walk	1:26:22
2007	World Championships	Osaka, Japan	22nd	50 km walk	4:08:22
2008	Olympic Games	Beijing, China	35th	50 km walk	4:06:30
2009	European Race Walking Cup	Metz, France	24th	20 km walk	1:36:03
2009	World Championships	Berlin, Germany	24th	50 km walk	3:59:39
2010	World Race Walking Cup	Chihuahua, Mexico	32nd	50 km walk	4:15:23
2010	European Championships	Barcelona, Spain	—	50 km walk	DNF
2011	European Race Walking Cup	Olhão, Portugal	—	50 km walk	DNF
2011	World Championships	Daegu, South Korea	—	50 km walk	DQ
2012	Olympic Games	London, United Kingdom	48th	50 km walk	4:09:32
