= 1991 South American Junior Championships in Athletics =

XXIII South American Junior Championships in Athletics
- Dates: June 21–23
- Host city: Asunción, Paraguay
- Level: Junior
- Events: 39
- Participation: about 212 athletes from 9 nations

The 23rd South American Junior Championships in Athletics were held in Asunción, Paraguay from June 21–23, 1991.

== Participation (unofficial) ==
Detailed result lists can be found on the "World Junior Athletics History" website. An unofficial count yields the number of about 212 athletes from about 9 countries: Argentina (47), Bolivia (6), Brazil (58), Chile (33), Colombia (6), Ecuador (16), Paraguay (28), Peru (12), Uruguay (6).

== Medal summary ==
Medal winners are published for men and women Complete results can be found on the "World Junior Athletics History" website.

=== Men ===
Event	Gold		Silver		Bronze	
100 metres	André da Silva (BRA)	10.92	Elvis Adão (BRA)	11.12	Oscar Cavero (CHI)	11.22
200 metres	André da Silva (BRA)	21.8	Oscar Cavero (CHI)	22.3	Elvis Adão (BRA)	22.4
400 metres	Sanderlei Parrela (BRA)	48.6	Sebastián Keitel (CHI)	48.8	Julio Caballero (PAR); Rogério da Silva (BRA)	49.6
800 metres	Benvenuto Silva (BRA)	1:56.1	Mauro González (CHI)	1:56.9	Márcio de Resende (BRA)	1:57.4
1500 metres	Benvenuto Silva (BRA)	3:58.0	Cristian Alfonsín (ARG)	4:00.6	Oscar Cortínez (ARG)	4:00.7
5000 metres	William Roldán (COL)	15:13.7	Emerson Iser Bem (BRA)	15:26.8	Hernán Orcellet (ARG)	15:29.8
10,000 metres	Eduardo do Nascimento (BRA)	31:10.4	James dos Santos (BRA)	31:10.7	Víctor Ojeda (CHI)	31:19.5
110 metres hurdles	Cleverson da Silva (BRA)	14.87	Alexandre Bento (BRA)	15.17	Ricardo D'Andrilli (ARG)	15.24
400 metres hurdles	Cleverson da Silva (BRA)	54.59	Alonso Segura (COL)	55.74	Sérgio Ribeiro (BRA)	55.76
2000 metres steeplechase	Emerson Vettori (BRA)	5:59.5	James dos Santos (BRA)	5:59.6	Pablo Aguería (ARG)	6:06.8
4 × 100 metres relay	Brazil; André da Silva; Clovis Schnaider; Elvis Adão; Marcelo Pereira	42.20	Peru; Carlos Atencio; Denis Bisbal; Miguel Calmet; Jacques Castillo	44.84	Ecuador; Patricio Corral; Steven Stander; Manuel Bravo; Efren Ycaza	45.09
4 × 400 metres relay	Brazil; Alesandre Morato; Rogerio da Silva; Sanderlei Parrela; Peterson Alves	3:21.1	Argentina; Nelson López; Ceferino Mondino; Andrés Vittone; Cristián Díaz	3:24.3	Chile; Sebastián Keitel; Mauro González; Pablo Almeida; Oscar Cavero	3:27.4
10,000 metres track walk	Jefferson Pérez (ECU)	43:10.1	João Sendeski (BRA)	44:32.0	Mauricio Cárdenas (ECU)	46:58.9
High jump	Ricardo D'Andrilli (ARG)	2.08	Alcides Silva (BRA)	2.05	Hugo Muñoz (PER)	2.02
Pole vault	Marlon Borges (BRA)	4.50	Cristián Goycolea (CHI)	4.20	Juan Beytía (CHI)	4.20
Long jump	Márcio da Cruz (BRA)	7.20	Nelson Ferreira (BRA)	6.91	Lewis Asprilla (COL)	6.82
Triple jump	Jairo Venâncio (BRA)	15.58	Jefferson Ilário (BRA)	14.72	Carlos Atencio (PER)	14.69
Shot put	Luís Fernandes (BRA)	14.26	Daniel Duharte (PER)	13.66	Hugo Scévola (ARG)	13.36
Discus throw	Julio Piñero (ARG)	47.34	Gilton Basílio (BRA)	42.02	Raúl Morcella (ARG)	41.24
Hammer throw	Hugo Scévola (ARG)	55.16	Héctor Bontempi (ARG)	52.78	Andrés Basso (CHI)	47.56
Javelin throw	Nery Kennedy (PAR)	64.28	Flavio de Souza (BRA)	59.60	Néstor Giménez (ARG)	56.36
Decathlon	Alcides Silva (BRA)	6173	Gilton Basílio (BRA)	5943	José Maugnier (ARG)	5238

=== Women ===
Event	Gold		Silver		Bronze	
100 metres	Tânia da Silva (BRA)	12.37	Lucimar de Moura (BRA)	12.48	Hannelore Grosser (CHI)	12.78
200 metres	Lucimar de Moura (BRA)	25.8	Hannelore Grosser (CHI)	26.0	Ednilza de Lima (BRA)	26.1
400 metres	Fátima dos Santos (BRA)	56.01	Patricia Oroño (ARG)	57.56	Rosa Magaly Segovia (COL)	58.87
800 metres	Fátima dos Santos (BRA)	2:16.9	Patricia Oroño (ARG)	2:19.0	Marta Orellana (ARG)	2:19.5
1500 metres	Carmen Naranjo (ECU)	4:42.8	Marta Orellana (ARG)	4:47.5	Lorena Calbul (CHI)	4:49.9
3000 metres	Carmen Naranjo (ECU)	9:41.6	Sandra Ruales (ECU)	9:51.6	Lorena Calbul (CHI)	10:15.1
10,000 metres	Sandra Ruales (ECU)	35:27.1	Ana de Oliveira (BRA)	38:11.3	Lorena Calbul (CHI)	39:03.9
100 metres hurdles	Sandra Izquierdo (ARG)	14.7	Gilda Massa (PER)	15.0	Shirley de Barros (BRA)	15.1
400 metres hurdles	Shirley de Barros (BRA)	61.71	Sandra Izquierdo (ARG)	63.32	Natalia Hinsch (ARG)	67.18
4 × 100 metres relay	Brazil; Lucimar de Moura; Tânia da Silva; Tatiana Orcy; Ednilza Ferreira	48.28	Chile; Lisette Rondón; Hannelore Grosser; Andrea Hoelzel; Judith De La Fuente	49.33	Argentina; Anahí Amigo; Sandra Izquierdo; Lorena Parrilla; Vanesa Wohlgemuth	50.01
4 × 400 metres relay	Brazil; Fatima dos Santos; Lucilene da Silva; Tânia Guerra; Tatiana Orcy	4:02.98	Argentina; Sandra Izquierdo; Patricia Oroño; Maricel Palmieri; Lorena Parrilla	4:03.35	Chile; Hannelore Grosser; Andrea Hoelzel; María González; Jacqueline Aedo	4:06.79
5000 metres track walk	Miriam Ramón (ECU)	23:57.7	Bertha Vera (ECU)	24:50.6	Ivana Henn (BRA)	25:49.0
High jump	Soledad Harambour (CHI)	1.65	Cintia Lais Matedi (BRA); Adriana Milan (BRA); Carolina Tovar (PAR)	1.60		
Long jump	Euzinete dos Reis (BRA)	5.78	Tânia da Silva (BRA)	5.56	Natalia Toledo (PAR)	5.48
Shot put	Elisângela Adriano (BRA)	16.12	Alexandra Amaro (BRA)	16.10	Silvana Filippi (ARG)	13.06
Discus throw	Elisângela Adriano (BRA)	51.06	Silvana Filippi (ARG)	44.04	Cintia Camossato (BRA)	42.34
Javelin throw	Natalia Toledo (PAR)	42.80	Zuleima Araméndiz (COL)	42.50	Mariela Arch (ARG)	38.14
Heptathlon	Euzinete dos Reis (BRA)	4931	Patrícia Moncalvo (BRA)	4217	Claudia Casals (ARG)	3901

== Medal table (unofficial) ==
* Host nation (Paraguay)

Rank	Nation	Gold	Silver	Bronze	Total
1	Brazil	27	19	8	54
2	Ecuador	5	2	2	9
3	Argentina	4	9	14	27
4	Paraguay*	2	1	2	5
5	Chile	1	6	10	17
6	Colombia	1	2	2	5
7	Peru	0	3	2	5
Totals (7 entries)		40	42	40	122
