= 2001 European Athletics U23 Championships – Men's 20 kilometres walk =

The men's 20 kilometres race walk event at the 2001 European Athletics U23 Championships was held in Amsterdam, Netherlands, on 15 July.

== Medalists ==
Gold	Juan Manuel Molina; Spain
Silver	Stepan Yudin; Russia
Bronze	José David Domínguez; Spain

== Results ==
=== Final ===
15 July

Rank	Name	Nationality	Time	Notes
1st place, gold medalist(s)	Juan Manuel Molina	Spain	1:23:03	
2nd place, silver medalist(s)	Stepan Yudin	Russia	1:23:10	
3rd place, bronze medalist(s)	José David Domínguez	Spain	1:23:16	
4	Alfio Alfrede Corsaro	Italy	1:23:24	
5	Denis Nizhegorodov	Russia	1:23:32	
6	Ivan Azarenok	Belarus	1:23:44	
7	Miloš Bátovský	Slovakia	1:24:02	
8	Radovan Elko	Slovakia	1:24:17	
9	Andrey Stepanchuk	Belarus	1:25:24	
10	Aivars Kadaks	Latvia	1:25:42	
11	Patrick Ennemoser	Italy	1:25:49	
12	Erik Tysse	Norway	1:26:58	
13	Kamil Kalka	Poland	1:27:12	
14	Jan Albrecht	Germany	1:27:54	
15	Xavier Le Coz	France	1:28:21	
16	Anatolijus Launikonis	Lithuania	1:30:23	
	Matthew Hales	United Kingdom	DQ	
	Frank Werner	Germany	DQ	

== Participation ==
According to an unofficial count, 18 athletes from 12 countries participated in the event.

- Belarus (2)
- France (1)
- Germany (2)
- Italy (2)
- Latvia (1)
- Lithuania (1)
- Norway (1)
- Poland (1)
- Russia (2)
- Slovakia (2)
- Spain (2)
- United Kingdom (1)
