= 2007 World Championships in Athletics – Men's 20 kilometres walk =

The men's 20 kilometres walk event at the 2007 World Championships in Athletics took place on August 26, 2007 in the streets of Osaka, Japan.

The event saw some controversy as Paquillo Fernández, who finished second after overtaking Hatem Ghoula in the final straight, was disqualified after the race for lifting. However, following an appeal by the Spanish team the same day, video evidence was examined and Fernández was found to have walked in compliance with the rules. He was thus re-awarded the silver medal.

Jefferson Pérez became the first race walker to win three World Championship gold medals. Also, Fernández won his third consecutive silver medal. Hatem Ghoula became the first African race walker to win a World Championship medal.

== Medallists ==
Gold	Jefferson Pérez; Ecuador (ECU)
Silver	Paquillo Fernández; Spain (ESP)
Bronze	Hatem Ghoula; Tunisia (TUN)

== Abbreviations ==
- All times shown are in hours:minutes:seconds

DNS	did not start
NM	no mark
WR	world record
AR	area record
NR	national record
PB	personal best
SB	season best

== Records ==
Standing records prior to the 2007 World Athletics Championships
World Record	Jefferson Pérez (ECU)	1:17.21	August 23, 2003	Paris, France
Event Record	Jefferson Pérez (ECU)	1:17.21	August 23, 2003	Paris, France

== Final ranking ==
Rank	Athlete	Nation	Time	Note
1st place, gold medalist(s)	Jefferson Pérez	Ecuador	1:22:20	
2nd place, silver medalist(s)	Paquillo Fernández	Spain	1:22:40	
3rd place, bronze medalist(s)	Hatem Ghoula	Tunisia	1:22:40	
4	Eder Sánchez	Mexico	1:23:36	
5	Giorgio Rubino	Italy	1:23:39	
6	Robert Heffernan	Ireland	1:23:42	
7	Luke Adams	Australia	1:23:52	
8	Erik Tysse	Norway	1:24:10	
9	Ilya Markov	Russia	1:24:35	
10	Alex Schwazer	Italy	1:24:39	SB
11	Koichiro Morioka	Japan	1:24:46	
12	Rolando Saquipay	Ecuador	1:25:03	
13	Li Gaobo	China	1:25:30	
14	Matej Tóth	Slovakia	1:25:57	
15	Park Chil-Sung	South Korea	1:26:08	
16	Juan Manuel Molina	Spain	1:26:26	
17	Benjamin Kuciński	Poland	1:26:43	
18	Andriy Kovenko	Ukraine	1:26:44	
19	Akihiro Sugimoto	Japan	1:26:45	
20	Kim Hyun-sup	South Korea	1:26:51	
21	Takayuki Tanii	Japan	1:26:53	
22	Luis Fernando López	Colombia	1:27:22	
23	Benjamin Sánchez	Mexico	1:27:29	
24	Hassanine Sebei	Tunisia	1:27:35	
25	João Vieira	Portugal	1:27:44	
26	Rafał Augustyn	Poland	1:27:54	
27	Ivan Trotski	Belarus	1:27:56	
28	Kevin Eastler	United States	1:28:29	
29	Han Yucheng	China	1:31:58	
30	Dong Jimin	China	1:32:03	
31	Timothy Seaman	United States	1:33:58	
32	Predrag Filipović	Serbia	1:35:51	
—	Jared Tallent	Australia	DQ	
—	Gabriel Ortiz	Mexico	DQ	
—	Andrés Chocho	Ecuador	DQ	
—	Ivano Brugnetti	Italy	DQ	
—	Daniel García	Mexico	DQ	
—	Igor Erokhin	Russia	DQ	
—	Gustavo Restrepo	Colombia	DQ	
—	Valeriy Borchin	Russia	DNF	
—	Sérgio Vieira	Portugal	DNF	
—	André Höhne	Germany	DNF	

== See also ==
- Athletics at the 2007 Pan American Games – Men's 20 kilometres walk
