= 2000 World Junior Championships in Athletics – Men's 10,000 metres walk =

The men's 10,000 metres walk event at the 2000 World Junior Championships in Athletics was held in Santiago, Chile, at Estadio Nacional Julio Martínez Prádanos on 19 October.

== Medalists ==
Gold	Cristián Berdeja; Mexico
Silver	Yevgeniy Demkov; Russia
Bronze	Viktor Burayev; Russia

== Results ==
=== Final ===
19 October

Rank	Name	Nationality	Time	Notes
1st place, gold medalist(s)	Cristián Berdeja	Mexico	40:56.47	
2nd place, silver medalist(s)	Yevgeniy Demkov	Russia	40:56.53	
3rd place, bronze medalist(s)	Viktor Burayev	Russia	40:56.57	
4	Takeaki Akatsuma	Japan	42:39.08	
5	Pei Chuang	China	42:41.01	
6	Patrick Ennemoser	Italy	42:50.73	
7	José Alessandro Bagio	Brazil	43:18.95	
8	Aleksandr Kuzmin	Belarus	43:20.96	
9	Chang Chunhu	China	43:25.28	
10	Troy Sundstrom	Australia	43:32.79	
11	Cristian Muñoz	Chile	43:45.22	
12	Aivars Kadaks	Latvia	44:08.44	
13	Benjamin Kuciński	Poland	44:12.06	
14	Iustin Tatarau	Romania	44:26.88	
15	Marco Taype	Peru	44:41.95	
16	Jan Albrecht	Germany	44:48.08	
17	Ciro González	Cuba	44:55.90	
18	Theódoros Koupidis	Greece	45:00.97	
19	John García	Colombia	45:12.00	
20	Yuki Yamazaki	Japan	45:19.21	
21	Andreas Gustafsson	Sweden	45:21.06	
22	Víctor Marín	Peru	46:06.90	
23	Colin Griffin	Ireland	46:17.00	
24	Andrés Chocho	Ecuador	46:17.66	
25	Florian Jourda	France	47:00.74	
26	André Katzinski	Germany	47:15.74	
27	Juan Mesquita	Uruguay	49:15.25	
	Gabriel Ortíz	Mexico	DQ	
	Maris Putenis	Latvia	DQ	
	Radek Parízek	Czech Republic	DNF	
	Viktor Jansson	Sweden	DNF	
	Paraskevas Vandoros	Greece	DNF	

== Participation ==
According to an unofficial count, 32 athletes from 23 countries participated in the event.

- Australia (1)
- Belarus (1)
- Brazil (1)
- Chile (1)
- China (2)
- Colombia (1)
- Cuba (1)
- Czech Republic (1)
- Ecuador (1)
- France (1)
- Germany (2)
- Greece (2)
- Ireland (1)
- Italy (1)
- Japan (2)
- Latvia (2)
- Mexico (2)
- Peru (2)
- Poland (1)
- Romania (1)
- Russia (2)
- Sweden (2)
- Uruguay (1)
