= 1988 South American Youth Championships in Athletics =

IX South American Youth Championships in Athletics
- Dates: September 2–4
- Host city: Cuenca, Ecuador
- Level: Youth
- Events: 38
- Participation: about 190 athletes from 9 nations

The 9th South American Youth Championships in Athletics were held in Cuenca, Ecuador, from September 2–4, 1988.

== Medal summary ==
Medal winners are published for boys and girls. Complete results can be found on the "World Junior Athletics History" website.

All results are marked as "affected by altitude" (A), because Cuenca is located at 2,560 metres above sea level.

=== Men ===
Event	Gold		Silver		Bronze	
100 metres	Elvis Adão (BRA)	11.0A	Leddil Paris (BRA)	11.1A	Eduardo Ojeda (PER)	11.4A
200 metres	Elvis Adão (BRA)	22.2A	Marcos Eres (BRA)	22.9A	Javier Bengoa (CHI)	23.4A
400 metres	Moisés Sandoval (CHI)	50.9A	Alexandre Marato (BRA)	51.3A	Eduardo Ojeda (PER)	51.4A
800 metres	Julio Carneiro (BRA)	1:58.0A	Elber Mosquera (COL)	2:00.6A	Márcio Magalhães (BRA)	2:01.8A
1500 metres	Daniel das Neves (BRA)	4:19.3A	Diego Toro (COL)	4:19.4A	Elver Romero (COL)	4:22.2A
3000 metres	Edilson Braz (BRA)	9:18.4A	Manuel de Moraes (BRA)	9:25.2A	Urbano Bayardo (COL)	9:31.1A
5000 metres	Julio Pozo (ECU)	16:40.0A	Lenin Guerra (ECU)	16:40.0A	Urbano Bayardo (COL)	16:40.0A
1500 metres steeplechase	Daniel das Neves (BRA)	4:30.6A	Diego Toro (COL)	4:34.7A	Edilson Bras (BRA)	4:41.9A
110 metres hurdles	Alexandre Bento (BRA)	14.4A	Paulo Dambacher (BRA)	14.7A	Luis Guerra (VEN)	14.8A
300 metres hurdles	Luis Guerra (VEN)	39.8A	Nicolás Majluf (CHI)	40.0A	André Pereira (BRA)	40.0A
High jump	Alcides Silva (BRA)	2.05A	Jairo Venâncio (BRA)	1.94A	Sergio Arraigada (CHI)	1.91A
Pole vault	Alcides Silva (BRA)	3.90A	Marlon Borges (BRA)	3.80A	Igor Castillo (PER)	3.40A
Long jump	Jefferson Ilário (BRA)	7.10A	Pablo Silva (ARG)	6.87A	Gustavo Rodríguez (ARG)	6.72A
Triple jump	Jefferson Ilário (BRA)	14.87A	Jairo Venâncio (BRA)	14.74A	Néstor Cano (PAR)	14.16A
Shot put	Luís Wanderlei (BRA)	16.21A	Marcos Balbuena (ARG)	15.89A	André Mohamad (BRA)	14.55A
Discus throw	Luís Wanderlei (BRA)	48.32A	Gilton Basílio (BRA)	44.70A	Antonio Consiglieri (PER)	41.02A
Hammer throw	Marcos Balbuena (ARG)	62.66A	Luís Wanderlei (BRA)	53.04A	Nelson Odaua (BRA)	52.46A
Javelin throw	Marcos Balbuena (ARG)	60.62A	Néstor Cano (PAR)	51.88A	Gilberto de Oliveira (BRA)	43.36A
Hexathlon	José dos Santos (BRA)	4020A	Andrés Carvajal (CHI)	3944A	José Butrón (CHI)	3789A
5000 metres track walk	Jefferson Pérez (ECU)	24:44.4A	Henry Guevara (COL)	26:11.2A	Mauricio Cardenas (ECU)	26:30.8A
4 × 100 metres relay	Brazil; Elvis Adao; Leonel Paris; Bauto; Marcos Merea	43.3A	Chile; Moisés Sandoval; Xavier Burgos; Álvaro Delgado; Nicolás Majluf	44.3A	Ecuador; Henry Teran; Darwin Salazar; Juan Ramos; Sánchez	44.4A
4 × 400 metres relay	Brazil	3:25.5A	Chile	3:31.7A	Ecuador	3:33.2A

=== Women ===
Event	Gold		Silver		Bronze	
100 metres	Elizabeth Minetti (ARG)	12.2A	Lisette Rondón (CHI)	12.3A	Patricia Daniya (PER)	12.4A
200 metres	Elizabeth Minetti (ARG)	25.1A	Rosa Magaly Segovia (COL)	25.3A	Lisette Rondón (CHI)	25.3A
400 metres	Rosa Magaly Segovia (COL)	57.9A	Claudia Herrera (CHI)	58.5A	Patricia Oroño (ARG)	59.3A
800 metres	Beatriz Hernández (COL)	2:20.6A	Janeth Caizalitín (ECU)	2:21.6A	Lilian Guerra (ECU)	2:25.2A
1500 metres	Soledad Villamarín (ECU)	4:55.8A	Sandra Ruales (ECU)	4:55.8A	Beatriz Hernández (COL)	5:00.6A
3000 metres	Soledad Villamarín (ECU)	10:42.9A	Sandra Ruales (ECU)	10:44.5A	Daysi Burgos (COL)	11:03.2A
100 metres hurdles	Michelle Openshaw (PER)	14.7A	Cintia Camossato (BRA)	14.9A	Daniela Rodrigues (BRA)	15.4A
High jump	Katherine Yáñez (PER)	1.58A	Cintia Camossato (BRA)	1.58A	Carmen Melo (ECU)	1.55A
Long jump	Natalia Toledo (PAR)	5.81A	Claudia Herrera (CHI)	5.56A	Tânia da Silva (BRA)	5.51A
Shot put	Alexandra Amaro (BRA)	13.93A	Elisângela Adriano (BRA)	12.85A	Karina Davis (ECU)	10.35A
Discus throw	Elisângela Adriano (BRA)	42.60A	Cintia Camossato (BRA)	39.74A	Verónica Tripoloni (ARG)	37.50A
Javelin throw	Natalia Toledo (PAR)	41.08A	María Bengolea (CHI)	36.86A	Rosa Balanta (COL)	34.02A
Pentathlon	Natalia Toledo (PAR)	3222A	Euzinete dos Reis (BRA)	3172A	Katherine Yáñez (PER)	2940A
3000 metres track walk	Miriam Ramón (ECU)	15:19.1A	Luisa Nivicela (ECU)	15:30.6A	Ernestina Castellanos (COL)	18:05.5A
4 × 100 metres relay	Chile; Lisette Rondón; Judith De La Fuente; Claudia Barrera; María González	48.3A	Peru; Patricia Adaniya; Michelle Openshaw; Lucia Crosse; Cecilia Zereceda	49.3A	Colombia; Angelica Garzon; Rosa Magaly Segovia; Angelica Mendoza; Clemencia Ramírez	49.4A
4 × 400 metres relay	Chile	4:02.8A	Brazil	4:03.6A	Ecuador	4:04.4A

== Medal table (unofficial) ==
* Host nation (Ecuador)

Rank	Nation	Gold	Silver	Bronze	Total
1	Brazil (BRA)	18	16	8	42
2	Ecuador (ECU)*	5	5	7	17
3	Argentina (ARG)	4	2	3	9
4	Chile (CHI)	3	8	4	15
5	Paraguay (PAR)	3	1	1	5
6	Colombia (COL)	2	5	8	15
7	Peru (PER)	2	1	6	9
8	Venezuela (VEN)	1	0	1	2
Totals (8 entries)		38	38	38	114

== Participation (unofficial) ==
Detailed result lists can be found on the "World Junior Athletics History" website. An unofficial count yields the number of about 190 athletes from about 9 countries:

- Argentina (11)
- Bolivia (9)
- Brazil (50)
- Chile (23)
- Colombia (17)
- Ecuador (49)
- Paraguay (6)
- (Peru) Perú (24)
- Venezuela (1)
