= Kamil Kalka =

Polish racewalker

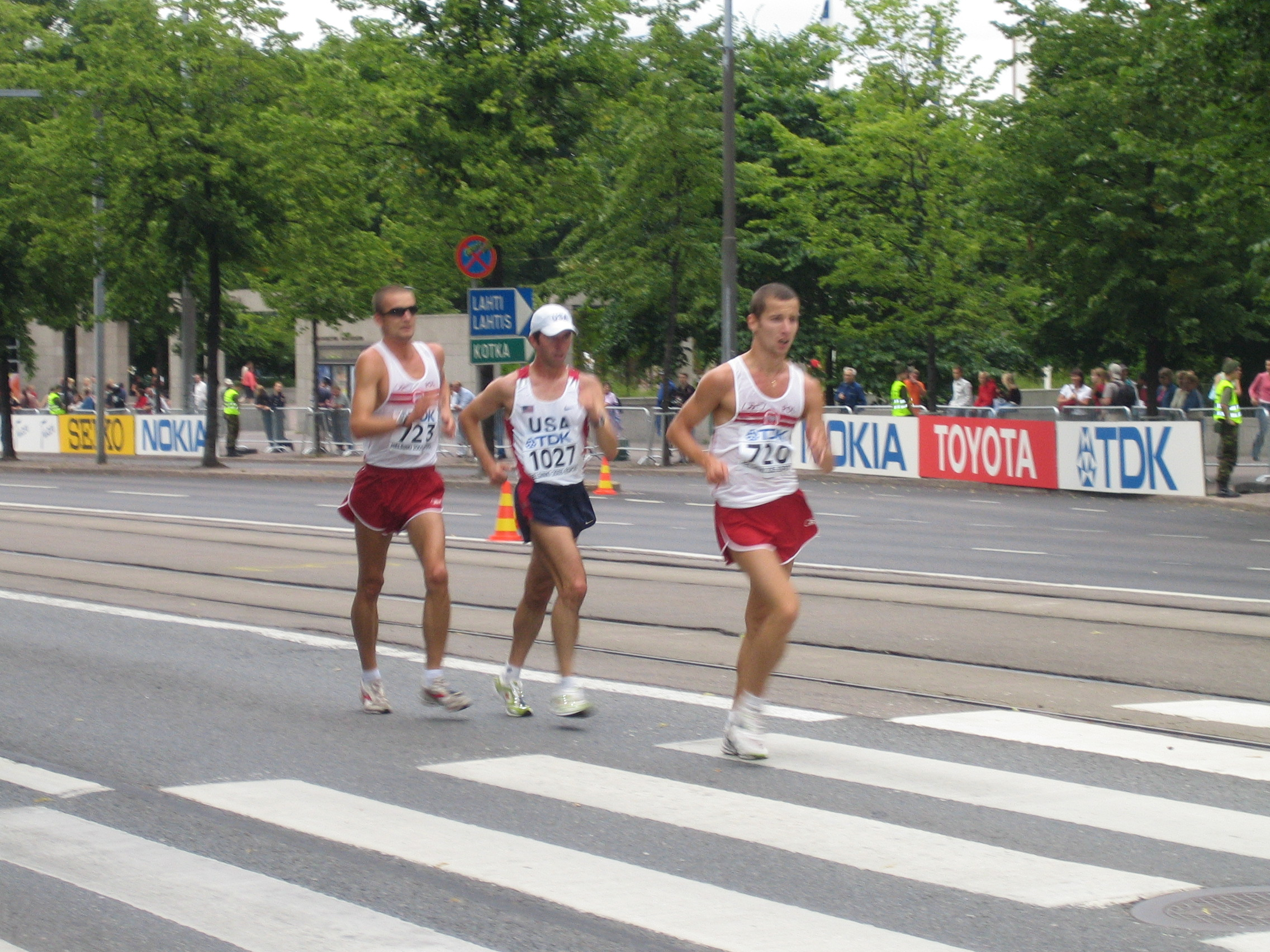
Kamil Kalka (on the left)

Kamil Kalka (born 28 May 1981 in Wągrowiec) is a Polish race walker.

== Achievements ==
Year	Competition	Venue	Position	Event	Notes
Representing Poland
2001	European Race Walking Cup	Dudince, Slovakia	42nd	20 km	1:29:04
2001	European U23 Championships	Amsterdam, Netherlands	13th	20 km	1:27:12
2003	European U23 Championships	Bydgoszcz, Poland	8th	20 km	1:27:19
2005	Universiade	İzmir, Turkey	7th	20 km	1:28:28
2005	World Championships	Helsinki, Finland	24th	20 km	1:25:02
2006	World Race Walking Cup	A Coruña, Spain	14th	50 km	3:54:44 (PB)
2006	European Championships	Gothenburg, Sweden	17th	50 km	4:01:28
2007	World Championships	Osaka, Japan	—	50 km	DNF
