= Kim Dong-young =

- Hangul: 김동영
- RR: Gim Dongyeong
- MR: Kim Tongyŏng

Kim Dong-young (Korean: 김동영) is a Korean name consisting of the family name Kim and the given name Dong-young, and may also refer to:

- Kim Dong-young (racewalker) (born 1980), South Korean athlete
- Kim Dong-young (actor) (born 1988), South Korean actor
- Kim Dong-young (singer) (born 1996), South Korean singer and member of NCT known by his stage name Doyoung
