= Velero Bridge =

Coordinates: 2°11′20″S 79°54′4″W

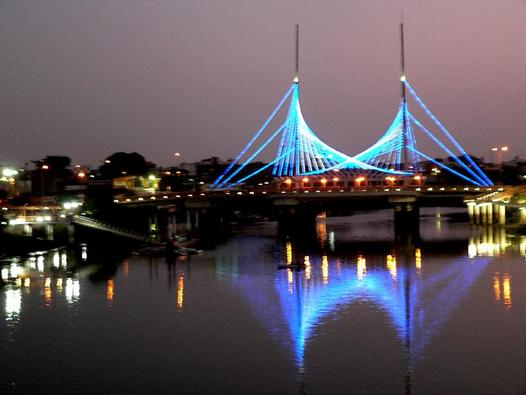
Velero Bridge

Velero Bridge, also known as "El Velero", (Spanish: Puente del Velero) is a bridge in Guayaquil, Ecuador. One of the prominent landmarks of the city, especially when lit up at night, it was inaugurated on July 27, 2005. It forms part of the route of the Guayaquil Marathon.
