= Mario Iván Flores =

Mexican racewalker (born 1979)

Medal record

Racewalking

Representing Mexico

CAC Junior Championships (U20)
Gold medal – first place	1998 George Town	10,000 m

Mario Iván Flores Hernández (born 28 February 1979 in Ciudad de México, Distrito Federal) is a Mexican race walker.

== Achievements ==
Year	Competition	Venue	Position	Event	Notes
Representing Mexico
1996	World Junior Championships	Sydney, Australia	8th	10,000m	42:40.53
1998	World Junior Championships	Annecy, France	3rd	10,000 m	42:04.55
1999	Central American and Caribbean Championships	Bridgetown, Barbados	3rd	20 km	1:36:26
2001	Central American and Caribbean Championships	Guatemala City, Guatemala	2nd	20 km	1:25:45
2004	Olympic Games	Athens, Greece	—	50 km	DNF
2008	World Race Walking Cup	Cheboksary, Russia	11th	50 km	3:51:16
