= Athletics at the 2005 Summer Universiade – Men's 20 kilometres walk =

The men's 20 kilometres walk event at the 2005 Summer Universiade was held on 16 August in İzmir, Turkey.

== Results ==
Rank	Athlete	Nationality	Time	Notes
1st place, gold medalist(s)	Juan Manuel Molina	Spain	1:24:06	
2nd place, silver medalist(s)	Kim Hyun-sub	South Korea	1:24:42	
3rd place, bronze medalist(s)	Koichiro Morioka	Japan	1:25:18	
4	Benjamin Kuciński	Poland	1:26:41	
5	Ivan Kuznetsov	Russia	1:27:14	
6	Park Chil-sung	South Korea	1:27:24	
7	Kamil Kalka	Poland	1:28:28	
8	Stepan Yudin	Russia	1:28:40	
9	Matej Tóth	Slovakia	1:28:58	
10	Benjamín Sánchez	Spain	1:29:05	
11	Siarhei Charnou	Belarus	1:29:10	
12	Predrag Filipović	Serbia and Montenegro	1:29:52	
13	Rafał Augustyn	Poland	1:30:56	
14	Álvaro García	Mexico	1:33:06	
15	Michał Jarosz	Poland	1:34:57	
	Rustam Kuvatov	Kazakhstan	DNF	
	Vladimir Parvatkin	Russia	DNF	
	Recep Çelik	Turkey	DNF	
	Georgi Georgiev	Bulgaria	DNF	
	Colin Griffin	Ireland	DQ	
	Cristian Berdeja	Mexico	DQ	
	Gabriel Ortiz	Mexico	DQ	
