= Athletics at the 2001 Summer Universiade – Men's 20 kilometres walk =

The men's 20 kilometres walk event at the 2001 Summer Universiade was held in Beijing, China on 29 August.

== Results ==
| Rank | Athlete | Nationality | Time | Notes |
|---|---|---|---|---|
| 1st place, gold medalist(s) | Lorenzo Civallero | Italy | 1:24:42 | |
| 2nd place, silver medalist(s) | Juan Manuel Molina | Spain | 1:25:07 | |
| 3rd place, bronze medalist(s) | He Xiaodong | China | 1:25:17 | |
| 4 | Denis Nizhegorodov | Russia | 1:25:31 | |
| 5 | Jefferson Pérez | Ecuador | 1:26:11 | |
| 6 | José David Domínguez | Spain | 1:26:18 | |
| 7 | Li Zewen | China | 1:26:34 | |
| 8 | Alejandro López | Mexico | 1:26:47 | |
| 9 | Cristian Berdeja | Mexico | 1:26:59 | |
| 10 | Luke Adams | Australia | 1:28:02 | |
| 11 | Miloš Bátovský | Slovakia | 1:29:43 | |
| 12 | Kim Dong-Young | South Korea | 1:30:03 | |
| 13 | Semen Lovkin | Russia | 1:30:47 | |
| 14 | Silviu Casandra | Romania | 1:30:50 | |
| 15 | Mário dos Santos | Brazil | 1:31:43 | |
| 16 | Sean Albert | United States | 1:32:11 | |
| 17 | Luis Fernando García | Guatemala | 1:33:43 | |
| 18 | Martin Pupiš | Slovakia | 1:35:16 | |
| 19 | Colin Griffin | Ireland | 1:37:47 | |
| | Artur Meleshkevich | Belarus | DNF | |
| | Fedosei Ciumacenco | Moldova | DNF | |
| | Albert Heppner | United States | DQ | |
| | Oscar Ramírez | Mexico | DQ | |
