= Jamie Costin =

Irish racewalker

Personal information
- Nationality: Irish
- Born: 1 June 1977 (age 49) Ring Gaelteacht, Waterford, Ireland
- Height: 181 cm (5 ft 11 in)
- Weight: 69 kg (152 lb)

Sport
- Sport: Athletics
- Event: Racewalking
- Club: West Waterford AC

James Costin (Irish: Séamus Ó Coistín; born 1 June 1977) is an Irish former race walker from the Gaeltacht area of Old Parish, County Waterford. He competed at two Olympic Games.

== Biography ==
He has qualified to represent Ireland in the 50km Walk at three Olympic Games. Having finished 38th at the 2000 Olympic Games in Sydney, he was unable to compete at the 2004 Olympic Games in Athens following a serious road accident where he broke his back.

Fully recovered, he represented Ireland at the 2008 Olympic Games in Beijing. In March 2009, Costin set a new Irish record of 3.50.52 at a race-walking meet in Dudince, Slovakia. He therefore qualified to compete in 2009 World Championships in Berlin.

He is married to Zuzanna Malikova, a Slovak Olympian.

== Achievements ==
Year	Competition	Venue	Position	Event	Notes
Representing Ireland
1996	World Junior Championships	Sydney, Australia	12th	10,000 m	43:20.78
1999	World Race Walking Cup	Mézidon-Canon, France	95th	20 km	1:37:54
1999	European U23 Championships	Gothenburg, Sweden	—	20 km	DNF
2000	European Race Walking Cup	Eisenhüttenstadt, Germany	17th	50 km	3:59:02
2000	Olympic Games	Sydney, Australia	38th	50 km	4:24:22
2001	European Race Walking Cup	Dudince, Slovakia	44th	20 km	1:29:14
2001	World Championships	Edmonton, Canada	28th	50 km	4:11:58
2002	European Championships	Munich, Germany	—	50 km	DQ
2002	World Race Walking Cup	Turin, Italy	62nd	20 km	1:35:15
2003	World Championships	Paris, France	—	50 km	DQ
2004	World Race Walking Cup	Naumburg, Germany	30th	20 km	1:23:08
2006	World Race Walking Cup	A Coruña, Spain	—	20 km	DNF
2007	World Championships	Osaka, Japan	—	50 km	DNF
2008	World Race Walking Cup	Cheboksary, Russia	58th	20 km	1:25:59
2008	Olympic Games	Beijing, China	44th	50 km	4:15:16
2009	European Race Walking Cup	Metz, France	—	20 km	DNF
2009	World Championships	Berlin, Germany	—	50 km	DNF
2010	European Championships	Barcelona, Spain	19th	20 km	1:26:05
2012	World Race Walking Cup	Saransk, Russia	—	50 km	DNF
