= Francisco Arcilla =

Spanish racewalker

Personal information
- Born: 14 January 1984 (age 42)

Sport
- Country: Spain
- Sport: Track and field
- Event: racewalking
- Updated on 29 August 2015

Francisco Arcilla Aller (born 14 January 1984) is a male Spanish racewalker. He competed in the 50 kilometres walk event at the 2015 World Championships in Athletics in Beijing, China. working in the leon

== Competition record ==
Year	Competition	Venue	Position	Event	Notes
Representing Spain
2001	World Youth Championships	Debrecen, Hungary	6th	10,000 m	44:45
2003	European Junior Championships	Tampere, Finland	3rd	10,000 m	42:06
2002	European U23 Championships	Erfurt, Germany	10th	20 km	1:30:33
2008	World Race Walking Cup	Cheboksary, Russia	61st	20 km	1:26:16
2008	Ibero-American Championships	Iquique, Chile	7th	20,000 m	1:26:44
2009	European Race Walking Cup	Metz, France	11th	20 km	1:28:24
2010	World Race Walking Cup	Chihuahua, Mexico	50th	20 km	1:32:31
2010	Ibero-American Championships	San Fernando, Spain	1st	20,000 m	1:24:38
2011	European Race Walking Cup	Olhão, Portugal	17th	20 km	1:28:59
2012	World Race Walking Cup	Saransk, Russia	38th	20 km	1:25:05
2013	European Race Walking Cup	Dudince, Slovakia	30th	20 km	1:27:19
2013	World Championships	Moscow, Russia	44th	20 km	1:29:38
2014	World Race Walking Cup	Taicang, China	25th	50 km	3:58:00
2014	European Championships	Zurich, Switzerland	21st	50 km	4:00:57
2015	World Championships	Beijing, China	35th	50 km	4:07:23
2016	World Race Walking Cup	Rome, Italy	11th	50 km	3:55:06
2016	Olympic Games	Rio de Janeiro, Brazil	55th	20 km	1:27:50
2017	European Race Walking Cup	Poděbrady, Czech Republic	9th	50 km	3:56:39
2017	World Championships	London, United Kingdom	26th	50 km	3:57:27

== See also ==
- Spain at the 2015 World Championships in Athletics
