= Benjamin Kuciński =

Polish race walker

Personal information
- Born: 1 June 1982 (age 44) Katowice, Poland
- Height: 180 cm (5 ft 11 in)
- Weight: 64 kg (141 lb)

Benjamin Kuciński (born 1 June 1982) is a Polish race walker.

== Competition record ==
Year	Competition	Venue	Position	Event	Notes
Representing Poland
1999	World Youth Championships	Bydgoszcz, Poland	4th	10,000 m walk	44:24.26
2000	World Junior Championships	Santiago, Chile	13th	10,000 m walk	44:12.06
2001	European Junior Championships	Grosseto, Italy	3rd	10,000 m walk	43:44.87
2002	World Race Walking Cup	Turin, Italy	42nd	20 km	1:29:58
2003	European U23 Championships	Bydgoszcz, Poland	1st	20 km walk	1:22:07
2003	World Championships	Paris, France	26th	20 km walk	1:27:41
2004	World Race Walking Cup	Naumburg, Germany	21st	20 km	1:22:04
2004	Olympic Games	Athens, Greece	12th	20 km walk	1:23:08
2005	World Championships	Helsinki, Finland	7th	20 km walk	1:20:34
2005	Universiade	İzmir, Turkey	4th	20 km walk	1:26:41
2007	Universiade	Bangkok, Thailand	5th	20 km walk	1:26:25
2007	World Championships	Osaka, Japan	17th	20 km walk	1:26:43
2009	European Race Walking Cup	Metz, France	—	20 km walk	DNF
2009	European Race Walking Cup	Metz, France	3rd	Team - 20 km	40 pts
