= Athletics at the 2002 Asian Games – Men's 20 kilometres walk =

Men's 20 kilometres walk at the 2002 Asian Games
- Venue: Busan Asiad Main Stadium
- Date: 7 October 2002
- Competitors: 8 from 6 nations

Medalists
gold medal	Valeriy Borisov	Kazakhstan
silver medal	Yu Chaohong	China
bronze medal	Satoshi Yanagisawa	Japan

The men's 20 kilometres walk competition at the 2002 Asian Games in Busan, South Korea was held on 7 October at the Busan Asiad Main Stadium.

== Schedule ==
All times are Korea Standard Time (UTC+09:00)

Date	Time	Event
Monday, 7 October 2002	08:30	Final

== Records ==
Prior to this competition, the existing world, Asian and Games records were as follows.

World Record	Paquillo Fernández (ESP)	1:17:22	Turku, Finland	28 April 2002
Asian Record	Li Zewen (CHN)	1:18:32	Poděbrady, Czech Republic	19 April 1997
Games Record	Yu Guohui (CHN)	1:20:25	Bangkok, Thailand	13 December 1998

== Results ==
Legend

- DSQ — Disqualified

Rank	Athlete	Time	Notes
1st place, gold medalist(s)	Valeriy Borisov (KAZ)	1:24.20	
2nd place, silver medalist(s)	Yu Chaohong (CHN)	1:24.23	
3rd place, bronze medalist(s)	Satoshi Yanagisawa (JPN)	1:25:33	
4	Kim Dong-young (KOR)	1:26:04	
5	Waleed Ahmed Al-Sabahy (QAT)	1:29:54	
6	Nishantha Nayanananda (SRI)	1:31:51	
—	Yuki Yamazaki (JPN)	DSQ	
—	Zhu Hongjun (CHN)	DSQ	
