= Juan Carlos Cardona =

Colombian long-distance runner

Juan Carlos Romero
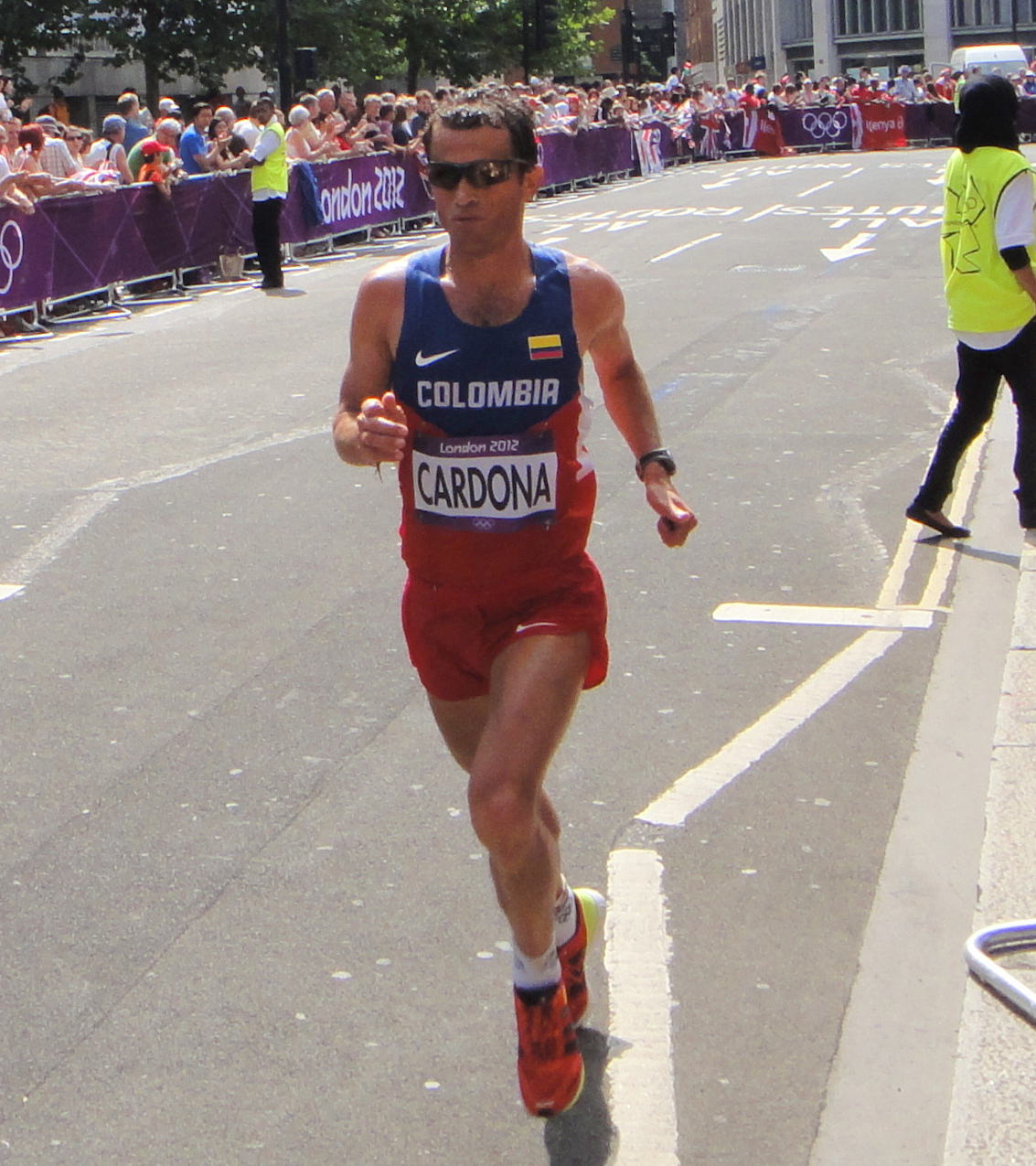
- Cardona in the marathon at the 2012 Olympics in London

Personal information
- Full name: Juan Carlos Cardona Rivas
- Born: 7 September 1974 (age 52) Jardin, Antioquia, Colombia
- Height: 1.68 m (5 ft 6 in)
- Weight: 60 kg (130 lb)

Sport
- Country: Colombia
- Sport: Athletics
- Event: Marathon
- Updated on 18 December 2014

Juan Carlos Cardona Rivas (born 7 September 1974) is a Colombian marathon runner who thrice represented his native country in the men's marathon at the Summer Olympics (2004, 2008 and 2012). He won the 2007 edition of the Buenos Aires Marathon in Argentina. He finished 83rd in the marathon at the 2012 Summer Olympics.

== Personal bests ==
- Marathon: 2:12:17 hrs – Boston, United States, 18 April 2011

== Achievements ==
| Year | Competition | Venue | Position | Event | Notes |
Representing Colombia
| 2002 | Central American and Caribbean Games | San Salvador, El Salvador | 3rd | Marathon | 2:21:27 |
| 2003 | World Championships | Paris, France | 28th | Marathon | 2:14:52 |
| 2004 | Olympic Games | Athens, Greece | 51st | Marathon | 2:22:49 |
| 2005 | Guayaquil Marathon | Guayaquil, Ecuador | 1st | Marathon | 2:20:05 |
| 2006 | Central American and Caribbean Games | Cartagena, Colombia | 2nd | Marathon | 2:27:43 |
| 2006 | Guayaquil Marathon | Guayaquil, Ecuador | 1st | Marathon | 2:23:18 |
| 2007 | Buenos Aires Marathon | Buenos Aires, Argentina | 1st | Marathon | 2:16:06 |
| 2008 | Olympic Games | Beijing, China | 43rd | Marathon | 2:21:57 |
| 2010 | Central American and Caribbean Games | Mayagüez, Puerto Rico | 3rd | Marathon | 2:22:35 |
| 2010 | Baltimore Marathon | Baltimore, United States | 2nd | Marathon | 2:13:29 |
| 2011 | Pan American Games | Guadalajara, Mexico | 3rd | Marathon | 2:18:20 |
| 2012 | Olympic Games | London, United Kingdom | 83rd | Marathon | 2:40:13 |
| 2014 | Central American and Caribbean Games | Xalapa, Mexico | 4th | Marathon | 2:21:32 A |
