= Stepan Yudin =

Russian racewalker (born 1980)

Stepan Yudin (Russian: Степан Юдин, born 3 April 1980) is a male race walker from Russia.

== Achievements ==
Year	Competition	Venue	Position	Event	Notes
Representing Russia
2001	European U23 Championships	Amsterdam, Netherlands	2nd	20 km	1:23:10
2002	World Race Walking Cup	Turin, Italy	5th	50 km	3:51:03
2003	World Student Games	Daegu, South Korea	1st	20 km	1:23:34
2005	World Student Games	İzmir, Turkey	8th	20 km	1:28:40
