= 2003 European Athletics U23 Championships – Men's 20 kilometres walk =

The men's 20 kilometres race walk event at the 2003 European Athletics U23 Championships was held in Bydgoszcz, Poland, on 19 July.

== Medalists ==
Gold	Benjamin Kuciński; Poland
Silver	Sergey Lystsov; Russia
Bronze	Andrei Talashka; Belarus

== Results ==
=== Final ===
19 July

Rank	Name	Nationality	Time	Notes
1st place, gold medalist(s)	Benjamin Kuciński	Poland	1:22:07	
2nd place, silver medalist(s)	Sergey Lystsov	Russia	1:24:04	
3rd place, bronze medalist(s)	Andrei Talashka	Belarus	1:24:28	
4	Patrick Ennemoser	Italy	1:25:05	
5	Aleksandr Yargunkin	Russia	1:25:43	
6	Matej Tóth	Slovakia	1:25:59	
7	Aleksandr Kuzmin	Belarus	1:26:55	
8	Kamil Kalka	Poland	1:27:19	
9	Pyotr Trofimov	Russia	1:28:26	
10	Rafał Dyś	Poland	1:29:53	
	Colin Griffin	Ireland	DQ	

== Participation ==
According to an unofficial count, 11 athletes from 6 countries participated in the event.

- Belarus (2)
- Ireland (1)
- Italy (1)
- Poland (3)
- Russia (3)
- Slovakia (1)
