= Athletics at the 2007 Summer Universiade – Men's 20 kilometres walk =

The men's 20 kilometres walk event at the 2007 Summer Universiade was held on 14 August.

== Results ==
Rank	Name	Nationality	Time	Notes
1st place, gold medalist(s)	Zhu Yafei	China	1:24:37	
2nd place, silver medalist(s)	Park Chil-sung	South Korea	1:24:42	
3rd place, bronze medalist(s)	Kōichirō Morioka	Japan	1:25:10	
4	Yusuke Suzuki	Japan	1:25:50	
5	Benjamin Kuciński	Poland	1:26:25	
6	Kim Hyun-sub	South Korea	1:27:20	
7	Aleksander Yargunkin	Russia	1:27:40	
8	Gabriel Ortiz	Mexico	1:28:34	
9	Zeng Guoqiang	China	1:29:15	
10	Maik Berger	Germany	1:29:17	
11	Mikalai Seradovich	Belarus	1:29:59	
12	Diogo Martins	Portugal	1:30:20	
13	Pasquale Aragona	Italy	1:30:42	
14	Andrés Chocho	Ecuador	1:31:24	
15	Rafał Augustyn	Poland	1:31:46	
16	Aleksander Prokhorov	Russia	1:32:46	
17	Thomas Barnes	Australia	1:33:26	
18	Edison Moreno	Ecuador	1:34:01	
19	Levente Kapéri	Hungary	1:35:15	
20	Mabrook Saleh Mohamed	Qatar	1:38:43	
21	Marc Mundell	South Africa	1:40:26	
22	Veerapun Anunchai	Thailand	1:45:39	
23	Sim Soon Chye Edmund	Singapore	1:51:08	SB
	Cui Zhili	China	DQ	
	Alejandro Rojas	Mexico	DQ	
