= Miki Itakura =

Japanese racewalker

Miki Itakura (Japanese: 板倉 美紀; born August 1, 1975, in Ishikawa, Japan) is a retired Japanese female race walker. She competed for Japan at the 1992 Summer Olympics.

== Achievements ==
| Year | Competition | Venue | Position | Event | Notes |
Representing Japan
| 1992 | World Junior Championships | Seoul, South Korea | 3rd | 5000m | 22:25.58 |
| 1992 | Olympic Games | Barcelona, Spain | 23rd | 10 km | 47:11 |
| 1994 | World Junior Championships | Lisbon, Portugal | — | 5000m | DQ |
