= Dong Jimin =

Chinese racewalker

Dong Jimin (born October 10, 1983, in Gaoyou) is a male race walker from PR China. His personal best time is 1:18:45 hours, achieved in April 2006 in Yangzhou.

== Achievements ==
Year	Competition	Venue	Position	Event	Notes
Representing China
2007	World Championships	Osaka, Japan	30th	20 km	1:32:03
2008	Olympic Games	Beijing, PR China	30th	20 km	1:24:34
