= 1992 World Junior Championships in Athletics – Women's 5000 metres walk =

The women's 5000 metres walk event at the 1992 World Junior Championships in Athletics was held in Seoul, South Korea, at Olympic Stadium on 20 September.

== Medalists ==
Gold	Gao Hongmiao; China
Silver	Jane Saville; Australia
Bronze	Miki Itakura; Japan

== Results ==
=== Final ===
20 September

Rank	Name	Nationality	Time	Notes
1st place, gold medalist(s)	Gao Hongmiao	China	21:20.03	
2nd place, silver medalist(s)	Jane Saville	Australia	21:58.64	
3rd place, bronze medalist(s)	Miki Itakura	Japan	22:25.58	
4	Bertha Vera	Ecuador	22:30.45	
5	Kamila Holpuchová	Czechoslovakia	22:33.92	
6	María Vasco	Spain	22:34.26	
7	Michaela Hafner	Italy	22:34.33	
8	Doreen Sellenriek	Germany	22:47.19	
9	Ilona Skuja	Latvia	22:49.17	
10	Miwako Tsukada	Japan	22:57.04	
11	Tan Lihong	China	22:59.77	
12	Miriam Ramón	Ecuador	23:02.03	
13	Sofia Avoila	Portugal	23:10.69	
14	Yakobe Amsale	Ethiopia	23:10.88	
15	Sonata Milušauskaitė	Lithuania	23:24.56	
16	Raquel del Caz	Spain	23:29.59	
17	Linda Tenggren	Sweden	23:30.39	
18	Ginka Radeva	Bulgaria	23:34.92	
19	Helge Will	Germany	23:49.67	
20	Susan Armenta	United States	24:06.35	
21	Linda Coffee	Australia	24:16.02	
22	María Ambrocio	Guatemala	24:19.63	
23	Yoslaine Puñales	Cuba	24:31.92	
24	Jo Sun-Boon	South Korea	24:32.71	
25	Deirdre Gallagher	Ireland	24:59.45	
26	Giovanna Morejón	Bolivia	25:02.48	
27	Mylene Dupere	Canada	25:30.73	
28	Lisa Mathieson	New Zealand	25:44.95	
29	Deb Iden	United States	25:51.96	
30	Kim Dan-Oh	South Korea	25:54.81	
31	Rachel Gibbon	New Zealand	26:16.37	
32	Angelamar da Silva	Brazil	26:55.49	
	Susana Feitór	Portugal	DQ	
	Natalya Trofimova	Commonwealth of Independent States	DQ	
	Yuliya Korolyova	Commonwealth of Independent States	DQ	

== Participation ==
According to an unofficial count, 35 athletes from 24 countries participated in the event.

- Australia (2)
- Bolivia (1)
- Brazil (1)
- Bulgaria (1)
- Canada (1)
- China (2)
- Commonwealth of Independent States (2)
- Cuba (1)
- Czechoslovakia (1)
- Ecuador (2)
- Ethiopia (1)
- Germany (2)
- Guatemala (1)
- Ireland (1)
- Italy (1)
- Japan (2)
- Latvia (1)
- Lithuania (1)
- New Zealand (2)
- Portugal (2)
- South Korea (2)
- Spain (2)
- Sweden (1)
- United States (2)
