= Athletics at the 2003 Summer Universiade – Men's 20 kilometres walk =

The men's 20 kilometres walk event at the 2003 Summer Universiade was held on 25 August in Daegu, South Korea.

== Results ==
Rank	Athlete	Nationality	Time	Notes
1st place, gold medalist(s)	Stepan Yudin	Russia	1:23:34	
2nd place, silver medalist(s)	Vladimir Potemin	Russia	1:23:50	
3rd place, bronze medalist(s)	Vasily Ivanov	Russia	1:23:55	
4	Yu Guohui	China	1:24:09	
5	Park Chil-sung	South Korea	1:24:45	
6	Takayuki Tanii	Japan	1:24:57	
7	Pei Chuang	China	1:26:05	
8	Horacio Nava	Mexico	1:26:24	
9	Jorge Ignacio Silva	Spain	1:26:47	
10	Matej Tóth	Slovakia	1:27:51	
11	Nenad Filipović	Serbia and Montenegro	1:28:58	
12	Cristian Muñoz	Chile	1:29:04	
13	Colin Griffin	Ireland	1:29:21	
14	Miloš Bátovský	Slovakia	1:29:43	
15	Andrea Manfredini	Italy	1:29:57	
16	Andrei Talashko	Belarus	1:31:06	
	Andrés Chocho	Ecuador	DNF	
	Patrick Ennemoser	Italy	DNF	
	Siarhei Charnou	Belarus	DNF	
	Kim Dong-young	South Korea	DQ	
	Cristian Berdeja	Mexico	DQ	
