= Juan Manuel Molina =

Spanish racewalker

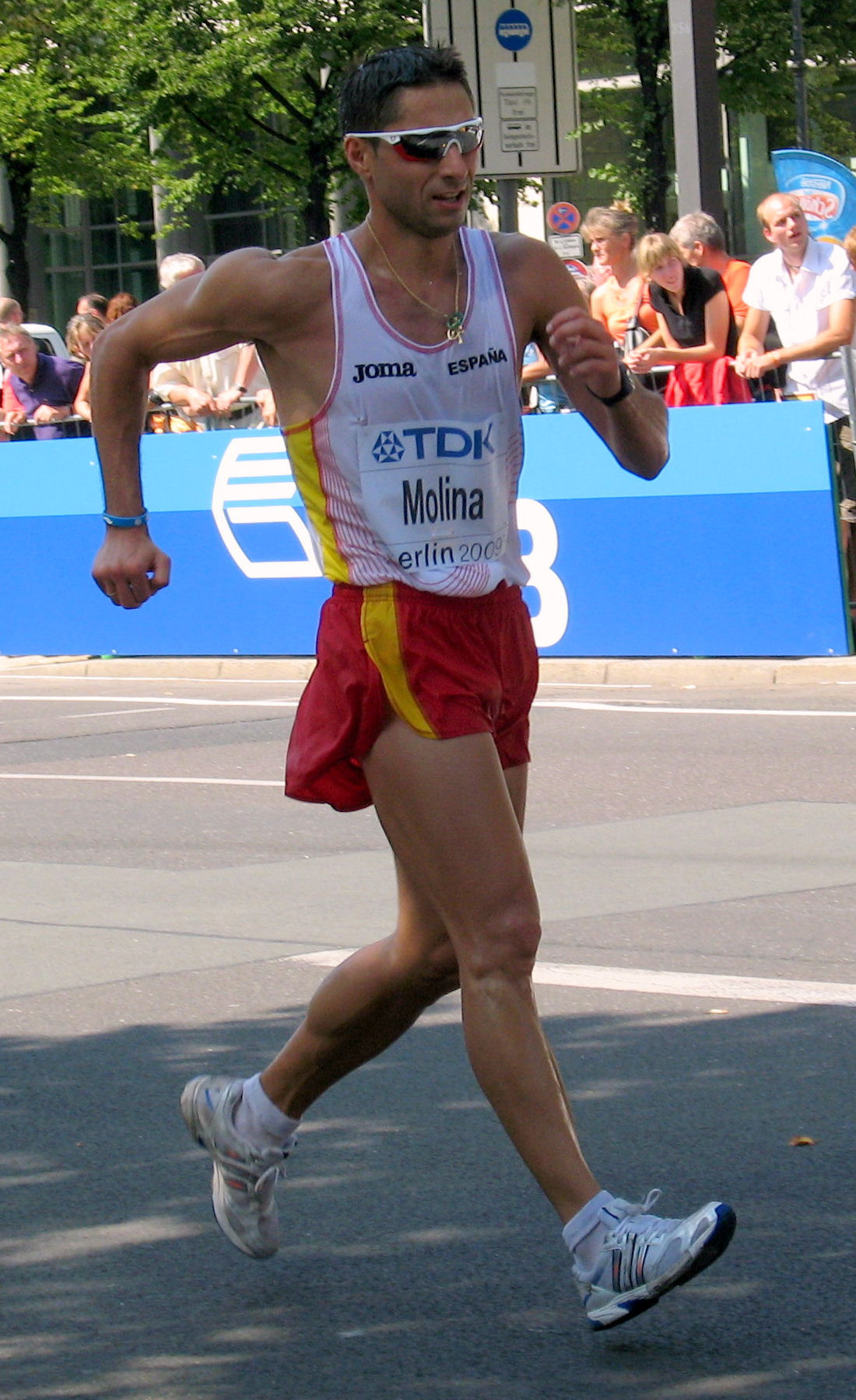
- Juan Manuel Molina at the 2009 World Championships

Personal information
- Born: March 15, 1979 (age 47) Cieza, Murcia, Spain

Sport
- Sport: Race walking
Medal record
Representing Spain
World Championships
Bronze medal – third place	2005 Helsinki	20km walk
European Championships
Bronze medal – third place	2002 Munich	20km walk
European U23 Championships
Gold medal – first place	2001 Amsterdam	20km walk
Summer Universiade
Gold medal – first place	2005 Izmir	20km walk
Silver medal – second place	2001 Beijing	20km walk
Mediterranean Games
Silver medal – second place	2005 Almeria	20km walk
Bronze medal – third place	2009 Pescara	20km walk

Juan Manuel Molina Morote (born March 15, 1979) is a male former race walker from Spain. He represented Spain at the Olympics in 2004 and 2008. His foremost achievement was a bronze medal in the 20 km walk event at the 2005 World Championships in Athletics. He competed at seven consecutive editions of the IAAF World Race Walking Cup, first appearing in 1999 and making his last outing in 2012.

He emerged in 2001 with a win at the 2001 European Athletics U23 Championships and second place at the 2001 Summer Universiade. He established himself on the senior circuit with a bronze medal at the 2002 European Athletics Championships. He was fifth at the 2004 Athens Olympics and won a series of medals in 2005, including silver medals at the European Race Walking Cup and Mediterranean Games and a gold medal at the Summer Universiade. His last major medal on the continental scene came at the Mediterranean Games, where he was the 20 km walk bronze medallist.

He retired from the sport, citing a long-term hamstring injury, after dropping out mid-race in the 50 km at the 2012 IAAF World Race Walking Cup.

Nowadays he is a sport professor of UCAM (University of Murcia)

== Achievements ==
Year	Competition	Venue	Position	Event	Notes
Representing Spain
1998	World Junior Championships	Annecy, France	4th	10,000 m	42:09.75
1999	World Race Walking Cup	Mézidon-Canon, France	33rd	20 km	1:27:00
1999	European U23 Championships	Gothenburg, Sweden	4th	20 km	1:25.34
2001	European Race Walking Cup	Dudince, Slovakia	10th	20 km	1:21:51
2001	European Race Walking Cup	Dudince, Slovakia	2nd	Team - 20 km	34 pts
2001	European U23 Championships	Amsterdam, Netherlands	1st	20 km	1:23:03
2001	Universiade	Beijing, PR China	2nd	20 km	1:25:07
2002	European Championships	Munich, Germany	3rd	20 km	1:20:36
2002	World Race Walking Cup	Turin, Italy	8th	20 km	1:23:46
2004	Olympic Games	Athens, Greece	5th	20 km	1:20:55
2004	World Race Walking Cup	Naumburg, Germany	8th	20 km	1:20:29
2005	European Race Walking Cup	Miskolc, Hungary	2nd	20 km	1:20:54
2005	European Race Walking Cup	Miskolc, Hungary	2nd	Team - 20 km	33 pts
2005	World Championships	Helsinki, Finland	3rd	20 km	1:19:44
2005	Universiade	İzmir, Turkey	1st	20 km	1:24:06
2005	Mediterranean Games	Almería, Spain	2nd	20 km	1:24:11
2006	World Race Walking Cup	A Coruña, Spain	12th	20 km	1:21:09
2007	World Championships	Osaka, Japan	16th	20 km	1:26:26
2008	World Race Walking Cup	Cheboksary, Russia	8th	20 km	1:19:19
2008	Olympic Games	Beijing, PR China	12th	20 km	1:21:25
2009	European Race Walking Cup	Metz, France	6th	20 km	1:25:58
2009	European Race Walking Cup	Metz, France	2nd	Team - 20 km	30 pts
2009	Mediterranean Games	Pescara, Italy	3rd	20 km	1:23:02
2009	World Championships	Berlin, Germany	24th	20 km	1:24:00
2010	World Race Walking Cup	Chihuahua, Mexico	22nd	50 km	4:06:08
2010	European Championships	Barcelona, Spain	8th	20 km	1:22:35
2012	World Race Walking Cup	Saransk, Russia	—	50 km	DNF
