= Liu Yunfeng =

Chinese racewalker

Liu Yunfeng (simplified Chinese: 刘云峰; traditional Chinese: 劉云峰; pinyin: Liú Yúnfēng; born August 3, 1979, in Suihua, Heilongjiang) is a male Chinese race walker.

In 2001 he received a two-year suspension for doping.

== Achievements ==
Year	Competition	Venue	Position	Event	Notes
Representing China
1996	World Junior Championships	Sydney, Australia	4th	10,000m	41:20.36
1998	World Junior Championships	Annecy, France	2nd	10,000 m	42:01.11
1999	World Race Walking Cup	Mézidon-Canon, France	11th	20 km	1:22:41
2004	World Race Walking Cup	Naumburg, Germany	5th	20 km	1:20:06
2005	World Championships	Helsinki, Finland	28th	20 km	1:26:54

== See also ==
- List of sportspeople sanctioned for doping offences
