= 1999 European Athletics U23 Championships – Men's 20 kilometres walk =

The men's 20 kilometres race walk event at the 1999 European Athletics U23 Championships was held in Gothenburg, Sweden, on 31 July 1999.

== Medalists ==
Gold	David Márquez; Spain
Silver	Semyon Lovkin; Russia
Bronze	Alfio Corsaro; Italy

== Results ==
=== Final ===
31 July

Rank	Name	Nationality	Time	Notes
1st place, gold medalist(s)	David Márquez	Spain	1:23.42	
2nd place, silver medalist(s)	Semyon Lovkin	Russia	1:24.04	
3rd place, bronze medalist(s)	Alfio Corsaro	Italy	1:24.25	
4	Juan Manuel Molina	Spain	1:25.34	
5	José Silva	Spain	1:26.26	
6	Maik Berger	Germany	1:27.17	
7	Franck Delree	France	1:28.37	
8	Pavel Nikolayev	Russia	1:29.12	
9	Marcus Hackbusch	Germany	1:29:43	
10	Karsten Gotfredsen	Denmark	1:30:26	
11	Marek Janek	Slovakia	1:31:03	
12	André Höhne	Germany	1:31:38	
13	Robert Heffernan	Ireland	1:36:26	
	Bogdan Mazilu	Romania	DQ	
	Martin Pupiš	Slovakia	DQ	
	Miloš Bátovský	Slovakia	DQ	
	Andrea Manfredini	Italy	DQ	
	Jamie Costin	Ireland	DNF	
	Aleksandr Andrushevskiy	Belarus	DNF	

== Participation ==
According to an unofficial count, 19 athletes from 10 countries participated in the event.

- Belarus (1)
- Denmark (1)
- France (1)
- Germany (3)
- Ireland (2)
- Italy (2)
- Romania (1)
- Russia (2)
- Slovakia (3)
- Spain (3)
