= 2005 European Athletics U23 Championships – Men's 20 kilometres walk =

The men's 20 kilometres race walk event at the 2005 European Athletics U23 Championships was held in Erfurt, Germany, on 16 July.

== Medalists ==
Gold	Igor Yerokhin; Russia
Silver	Benjamín Sánchez; Spain
Bronze	Mikalai Seradovich; Belarus

== Results ==
=== Final ===
16 July

Rank	Name	Nationality	Time	Notes
1st place, gold medalist(s)	Igor Yerokhin	Russia	1:23:14	
2nd place, silver medalist(s)	Benjamín Sánchez	Spain	1:23:30	
3rd place, bronze medalist(s)	Mikalai Seradovich	Belarus	1:23:56	
4	Rafał Augustyn	Poland	1:25:01	
5	Andriy Yurin	Ukraine	1:26:52	
6	Daniele Paris	Italy	1:27:56	
7	Michael Krause	Germany	1:28:25	
8	Artem Valchenko	Ukraine	1:29:14	
9	Marius Žiūkas	Lithuania	1:29:32	
10	Francisco Arcilla	Spain	1:30:33	
11	Michal Blažek	Slovakia	1:30:37	
12	Artur Brzozowski	Poland	1:31:44	
13	Luís Manuel Corchete	Spain	1:31:58	
14	Tadas Šuškevičius	Lithuania	1:32:42	

== Participation ==
According to an unofficial count, 14 athletes from 9 countries participated in the event.

- Belarus (1)
- Germany (1)
- Italy (1)
- Lithuania (2)
- Poland (2)
- Russia (1)
- Slovakia (1)
- Spain (3)
- Ukraine (2)
