= Athletics at the 2007 Pan American Games – Men's 20 kilometres walk =

Men's 20 kilometres walk at the Pan American Games

The Men's 20 km Race Walking event at the 2007 Pan American Games took place on July 22, 2007 in the Parque do Flamengo in Rio de Janeiro. Ecuador's Jefferson Pérez defended his title, defeating his compatriot Rolando Saquipay.

== Medalists ==
Gold	Jefferson Pérez; Ecuador
Silver	Rolando Saquipay; Ecuador
Bronze	Gustavo Restrepo; Colombia

== Records ==
World Record	Jefferson Pérez (ECU)	1:17:21	August 23, 2003	Paris, France
Pan Am Record	Bernardo Segura (MEX)	1:20:17	July 26, 1999	Winnipeg, Canada

== Results ==
Rank	Athlete	Time
Gold medal	Jefferson Pérez (ECU)	1:22:08
Silver medal	Rolando Saquipay (ECU)	1:23:28
Bronze medal	Gustavo Restrepo (COL)	1:24:51
4	Mário dos Santos (BRA)	1:29:53
5	Matthew Boyles (USA)	1:30:03
6	Allan Segura (CRC)	1:32:27
7	John Nunn (USA)	1:32:37
8	José Alessandro Bagio (BRA)	1:34:15
9	Juan Manuel Cano (ARG)	1:34:45
—	Bernardo Calvo (CRC)	DNF
—	Echarri Tapia (PER)	DNF
—	Cristian Berdeja (MEX)	DSQ
—	Erick Guevara (MEX)	DSQ
—	Luis Fernando López (COL)	DSQ
—	Julio René Martínez (GUA)	DSQ
—	Walter Sandoval (ESA)	DSQ

== See also ==
- 2007 World Championships in Athletics – Men's 20 kilometres walk
- 2007 Race Walking Year Ranking
- Athletics at the 2008 Summer Olympics – Men's 20 kilometre walk
