= José David Domínguez =

Spanish race walker

Personal information
- Born: December 29, 1980 (age 45) Cádiz, Spain

Sport
- Sport: Race walking
Medal record
Representing Spain
European U23 Championships
Bronze medal – third place	2001 Amsterdam	20km walk
European Junior Championships
Bronze medal – third place	1999 Riga	10km walk

José David Domínguez Guimera (born December 29, 1980) is a Spanish race walker.

He finished ninth in the 20 km race at the 2003 World Championships in a personal best time of 1:20:15 hours, and eighteenth at the 2004 IAAF World Race Walking Cup.

== Achievements ==
Year	Competition	Venue	Position	Event	Notes
Representing Spain
2000	European Race Walking Cup	Eisenhüttenstadt, Germany	16th	20 km	1:22:34
2000	Olympic Games	Sydney, Australia	35th	20 km	1:28:16
2001	European U23 Championships	Amsterdam, Netherlands	3rd	20 km	1:23:16
2001	Universiade	Beijing, China	6th	20 km	1:26:18
2003	World Championships	Paris, France	9th	20 km	1:20:15
2004	World Race Walking Cup	Naumburg, Germany	18th	20 km	1:21:45
2004	Olympic Games	Athens, Greece	37th	20 km	1:30:16
2006	Ibero-American Championships	Ponce, Puerto Rico	5th	20,000 m	1:34:47.24
2010	Ibero-American Championships	San Fernando, Cádiz	7th	20,000 m	1:29:31.4
