= David Márquez =

Spanish racewalker

David Márquez Laguna (born October 13, 1977, in Barcelona, Catalonia) is a retired male race walker from Spain.

== Achievements ==
Year	Competition	Venue	Position	Event	Notes
Representing Spain
1996	World Junior Championships	Sydney, Australia	2nd	10,000 m	41:03.73
1999	European U23 Championships	Gothenburg, Sweden	1st	20 km	1:23.42
2000	European Race Walking Cup	Eisenhüttenstadt, Germany	13th	20 km	1:21:44
2000	Olympic Games	Sydney, Australia	20th	20 km	1:24:36
2001	European Race Walking Cup	Dudince, Slovakia	20th	20 km	1:24:43
2001	World Championships	Edmonton, Canada	5th	20 km	1:21:09
2003	World Championships	Paris, France	7th	20 km	1:19:46 = PB
