= Jefferson Pérez =

Ecuadorian race walker (born 1974)

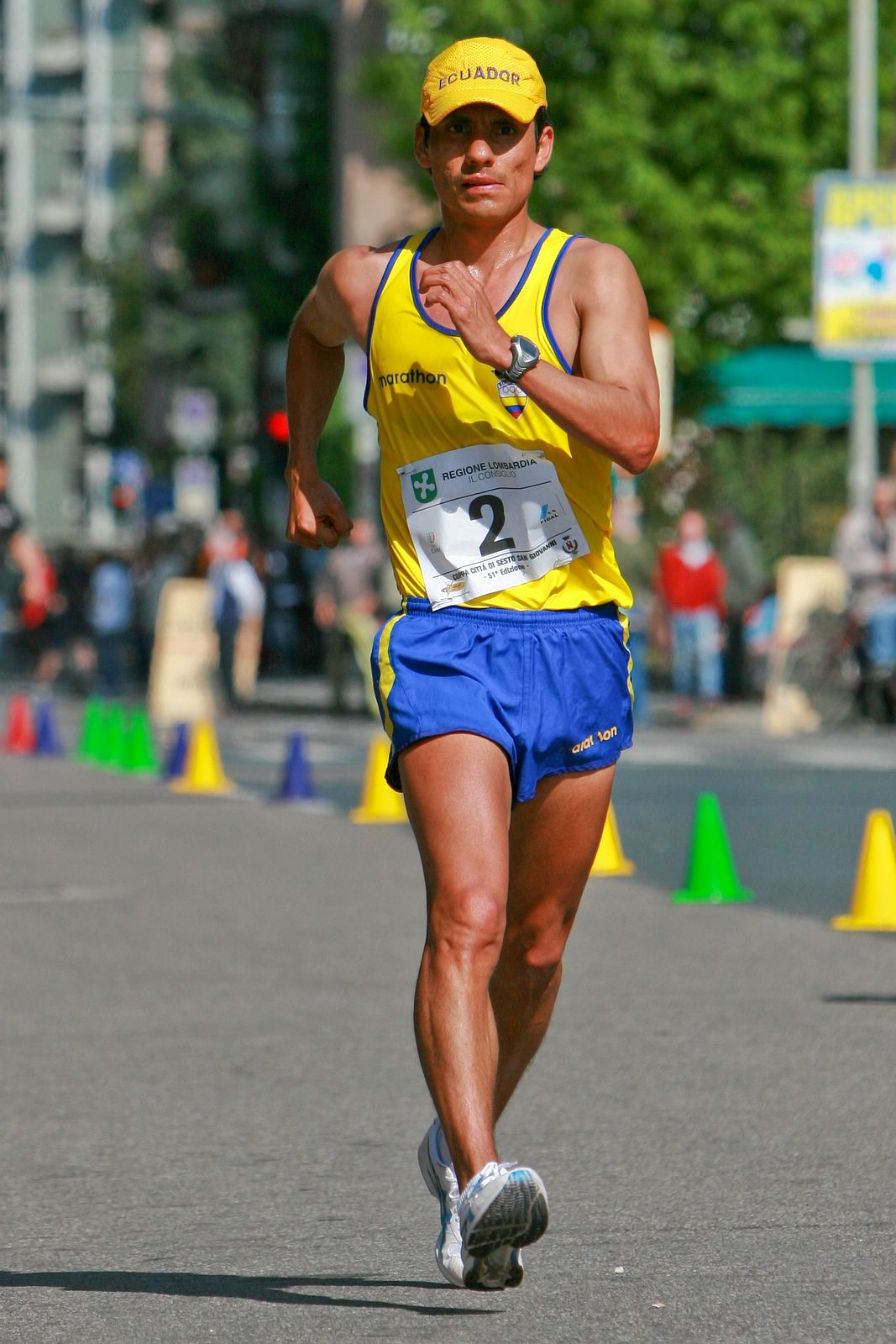
- Pérez in action in 2008

Personal information
- Full name: Jefferson Leonardo Pérez Quezada
- Nickname: Jeffi
- Born: 1 July 1974 (age 52) Cuenca, Azuay, Ecuador
- Education: University of Azuay
- Height: 1.67 m (5 ft 6 in)
- Weight: 60 kg (132 lb)

Sport
- Country: Ecuador
- Sport: Athletics
- Event: Race walking
- Retired: 21 September 2008 (age 34)

Achievements and titles
- Olympic finals: 1996 Summer Olympics; 2000 Summer Olympics; 2004 Summer Olympics; 2008 Summer Olympics
Medal record
Men's Race walking
Representing Ecuador
Olympic Games
Gold medal – first place	1996 Atlanta	20 km walk
Silver medal – second place	2008 Beijing	20 km walk
World Championships
Gold medal – first place	2003 Paris	20 km walk
Gold medal – first place	2005 Helsinki	20 km walk
Gold medal – first place	2007 Osaka	20 km walk
Silver medal – second place	1999 Seville	20 km walk
Pan American Games
Gold medal – first place	1995 Mar del Plata	20 km walk
Gold medal – first place	2003 Santo Domingo	20 km walk
Gold medal – first place	2007 Rio de Janeiro	20 km walk
Bronze medal – third place	1999 Winnipeg	20 km walk
South American Games
Gold medal – first place	1998 Cuenca	20 km walk
Bolivarian Games
Gold medal – first place	1993 Cochabamba	20 km walk
Gold medal – first place	1997 Arequipa	20 km walk
Gold medal – first place	2001 Ambato	20 km walk
Silver medal – second place	2005 Armenia	20 km walk
World Junior Championships
Gold medal – first place	1992 Seoul	10,000 m walk
Bronze medal – third place	1990 Plovdiv	10,000 m walk
South American Youth Championships
Gold medal – first place	1988 Cuenca	5 km walk
Gold medal – first place	1990 Lima	5 km walk

Jefferson Leonardo Pérez Quezada (born 1 July 1974) is an Ecuadorian retired race walker. He specialised in the 20 km event, in which he won the first two medals his country achieved in the Olympic Games.

== Early life ==
Pérez was born in El Vecino, one of the oldest neighborhoods in Cuenca, to Manuel Jesús Pérez and María Lucrecia Quezada. Like others in his neighborhood, his family was of limited economic means. He attended the elementary schools Eugenio Espejo and Gabriela Cevallos. Afterwards he entered the Francisco Febres Cordero high school, at the same time working to help out his family.

He graduated in Business Engineering and later obtained an MBA (Master in Business Administration) from the University of Azuay in Ecuador.

== Career ==
Pérez entered race-walking by accident. To prepare for a walk that served as a high school physical education exam, he asked his brother Fabián to train for one week next to the group of athletes directed by trainer Luis Muñoz. Muñoz decided to invite him to compete in a race. With few weeks of preparation he won the race AID, winning the right of representing Ecuador in New York City and London as a sport ambassador.

Initially he participated in distance competitions of six kilometers. Later he had to make a radical decision, which was to dedicate himself completely to race walking. His first regional trophy in the 5 km walk during the South American Pre-Junior championship held in his native city of Cuenca.

His first international achievement occurred when he won the bronze medal in the Junior World Cup of Athletics in Plovdiv, Bulgaria, in 1990.

Two years later, he won the Junior World title in Seoul, South Korea, followed shortly by victories in South American and Pan-American open competitions.

=== Olympic Games ===
Pérez won the gold medal at the 1996 Olympic Games in Atlanta, becoming the youngest ever Olympic race walk champion. Following his win he embarked on a 459 km (285 mi) pilgrimage, walking, jogging and running from Quito's Franciscan cathedral to his hometown of Cuenca.

He won a silver medal, his second medal, at the 2008 Olympic Games in Beijing. He had fourth-place finishes in the 20 km walk at the 2000 Olympic Games in Sydney and the 2004 Olympic Games in Athens.

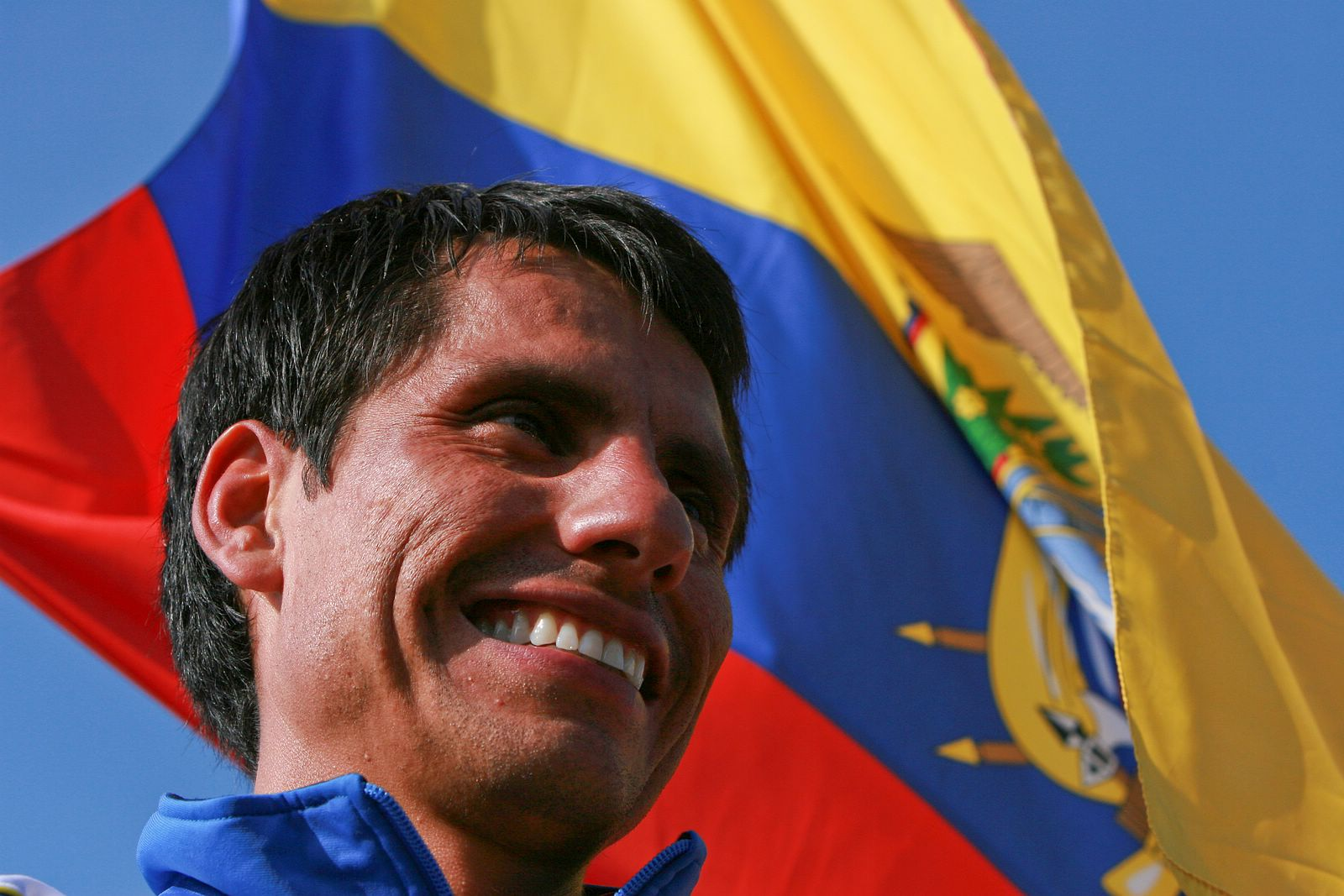
Jefferson with the Ecuadorian flag.

=== World Championships ===
Pérez won a silver medal at the 1999 World Championships in Seville.

He then won three consecutive gold medals from 2003 to 2007 at the World Championships in Paris, Helsinki, and Osaka, the only person that has been able to achieve this feat.

Pérez's winning time of 1:17:21 in 2003 became the first official world record for the 20 km walk when standards for road events were recognised from 2004 onwards and he received a financial bonus.

=== Retirement ===
Pérez walked his final race at the World Race Walking Challenge final in Murcia, Spain. He finished third in that race and second in the overall challenge standings.

He announced his retirement from the sport in 2008.

== Personal bests ==
Event	Result	Venue	Date
Road walk
10 km	38:24 min	(Poland) Kraków	8 June 2002
20 km	1:17:21 hrs	(France) Paris Saint-Denis	23 August 2003
50 km	3:53:04 hrs	(Greece) Athens	27 August 2004
Track walk
10,000 m	38:37.6 min (ht)	(Norway) Bergen	9 May 1998
20,000 m	1:20:54.9 hrs (ht)	(Colombia) Cali	5 July 2008

== International competitions ==
Representing Ecuador
Year	Competition	Venue	Position	Event	Result
1988	South American Youth Championships	Cuenca, Ecuador	1st	5 km	24:44.4 A
1989	South American Junior Championships	Montevideo, Uruguay	1st	10,000 m	45:03.71
1990	South American Junior Championships	Bogotá, Colombia	1st	10,000 m	42:57.95 A
1990	World Junior Championships	Plovdiv, Bulgaria	3rd	10,000 m	40:08.23
1990	South American Race Walking Cup (U20)	Guayaquil, Ecuador	1st	10 km	44:31.9
1990	South American Youth Championships	Lima, Peru	1st	5 km	19:49.54
1991	World Indoor Championships	Seville, Spain	10th	5000 m	20:20.05
1991	South American Junior Championships	Asunción, Paraguay	1st	10,000 m	43:10.1
1991	South American Championships	Manaus, Brazil	–	20 km	DQ
1991	Pan American Junior Championships	Kingston, Jamaica	2nd	10,000 m	44:06.11
1991	South American Race Walking Cup (U20)	Bogotá, Colombia	1st	10 km	42:48.6 A
1992	Ibero-American Championships	Seville, Spain	3rd	20 km	1:25:50.5
1992	Olympic Games	Barcelona, Spain	—	20 km	DNF
1992	South American Junior Championships	Lima, Peru	1st	10,000 m	45:31.2
1992	World Junior Championships	Seoul, South Korea	1st	10,000 m	40:42.66
1992	South American Race Walking Cup (U20)	São Paulo, Brazil	1st	10 km	45:39
1993	Bolivarian Games	Cochabamba, Bolivia	1st	20 km	1:26:19 A
1993	South American Junior Championships	Puerto La Cruz, Venezuela	1st	10,000 m	42:24.2
1993	South American Championships	Lima, Peru	1st	20 km	1:24:31
1993	Pan American Junior Championships	Winnipeg, Canada	1st	10,000 m	39:50.73
1994	South American Race Walking Cup	Sucre, Bolivia	1st	20 km	1:30:04 A
1994	Pan American Race Walking Cup	Atlanta, United States	3rd	20 km	1:24:34
1994	Ibero-American Championships	Mar del Plata, Argentina	5th	20 km	1:26:08.2
1995	South American Race Walking Cup	Cuenca, Ecuador	1st	20 km	1:27:46 A
1995	Pan American Games	Mar del Plata, Argentina	1st	20 km	1:22:53
1995	World Championships	Gothenburg, Sweden	33rd	20 km	1:34:20
1996	South American Race Walking Cup	São Paulo, Brazil	1st	20 km	1:25:33
1996	Olympic Games	Atlanta, United States	1st	20 km	1:20:07
1997	South American Race Walking Cup	Bogotá, Colombia	1st	20 km	1:26:19 A
1997	World Race Walking Cup	Poděbrady, Czech Republic	1st	20 km	1:18:24
1997	World Championships	Athens, Greece	14th	20 km	1:24:46
1997	Bolivarian Games	Arequipa, Peru	1st	20 km	1:27:54 A
1998	South American Race Walking Cup	Bogotá, Colombia	1st	20 km	1:22:53 A
1998	Pan American Race Walking Cup	Miami, United States	—	50 km	DNF
1998	Goodwill Games	Uniondale, United States	3rd	20,000 m	1:29:18.4
1998	South American Games	Cuenca, Ecuador	1st	20 km	1:23:11 A
1999	World Race Walking Cup	Mézidon-Canon, France	—	50 km	DNF
1999	Pan American Games	Winnipeg, Canada	3rd	20 km	1:20:46
1999	World Championships	Seville, Spain	2nd	20 km	1:24:19
2000	South American Race Walking Cup	Lima, Peru	1st	20 km	1:30:50
2000	Pan American Race Walking Cup	Poza Rica, Veracruz, Mexico	3rd	20 km	1:24.36
2000	Olympic Games	Sydney, Australia	4th	20 km	1:20:18
2001	World Championships	Edmonton, Canada	8th	20 km	1:22:20
2001	Universiade	Beijing, China	5th	20 km	1:26:11
2001	Bolivarian Games	Ambato, Ecuador	1st	20 km	1:30:27 A
2001	South American Race Walking Cup	Cuenca, Ecuador	1st	20 km	1:26:21 A
2001	Pan American Race Walking Cup	Cuenca, Ecuador	2nd	20 km	1:26:21 A
2001	South American Race Walking Cup	Cuenca, Ecuador	1st	Team	10 pts
2001	Pan American Race Walking Cup	Cuenca, Ecuador	2nd	Team	21 pts
2002	World Race Walking Cup	Turin, Italy	1st	20 km	1:21:26
2002	World Race Walking Cup	Turin, Italy	4th	Team	61 pts
2002	South American Race Walking Cup	Puerto Saavedra, Chile	—	20 km	DNF
2002	Ibero-American Championships	Guatemala City, Guatemala	1st	20,000 m	1:23:51 A
2003	Pan American Race Walking Cup	Chula Vista, United States	1st	20 km	1:23:12
2003	Pan American Race Walking Cup	Chula Vista, United States	2nd	Team	13 pts
2003	Pan American Games	Santo Domingo, Dominican Republic	1st	20 km	1:23:06
2003	World Championships	Saint-Denis, France	1st	20 km	1:17:21
2004	World Race Walking Cup	Naumburg, Germany	1st	20 km	1:18:42
2004	World Race Walking Cup	Naumburg, Germany	2nd	Team	35 pts
2004	Olympic Games	Athens, Greece	4th	20 km	1:20:38
2004	Olympic Games	Athens, Greece	12th	50 km	3:53:04
2005	South American Championships	Cali, Colombia	1st	20 km	1:22:54 A
2005	World Championships	Helsinki, Finland	1st	20 km	1:18:35
2005	Bolivarian Games	Armenia, Colombia	2nd	20 km	1:24:22 hrs A
2006	South American Race Walking Championships	Cochabamba, Bolivia	1st	20 km	1:26:27 A
2006	South American Race Walking Championships	Cochabamba, Bolivia	2nd	Team	12 pts
2006	World Race Walking Cup	A Coruña, Spain	2nd	20 km	1:19:08
2006	World Race Walking Cup	A Coruña, Spain	7th	Team	68 pts
2007	Pan American Race Walking Cup	Balneário Camboriú, Brazil	1st	20 km	1:25:08
2007	Pan American Games	Rio de Janeiro, Brazil	1st	20 km	1:22.08
2007	World Championships	Osaka, Japan	1st	20 km	1:22:20
2008	Central American and Caribbean Championships	Cali, Colombia	1st	20,000 m	1:20:54.9 A
2008	Olympic Games	Beijing, China	2nd	20 km	1:19:15

== In popular culture ==
He appeared on Japanese TV show Hey! Spring of Trivia multiple times - in one episode, he tested how long it actually took to walk to a train station from an apartment advertised as "5 minutes away" (for him, it took under 2 minutes); in another, the show tested whether he would walk or run away when threatened (he ran).

Records
Preceded by Paquillo Fernández	Men's 20km Walk World Record Holder; August 23, 2003 – September 29, 2007	Succeeded by Vladimir Kanaykin
