= Andreas Gustafsson =

Swedish race walker (born 1981)

Bo Andreas Gustafsson
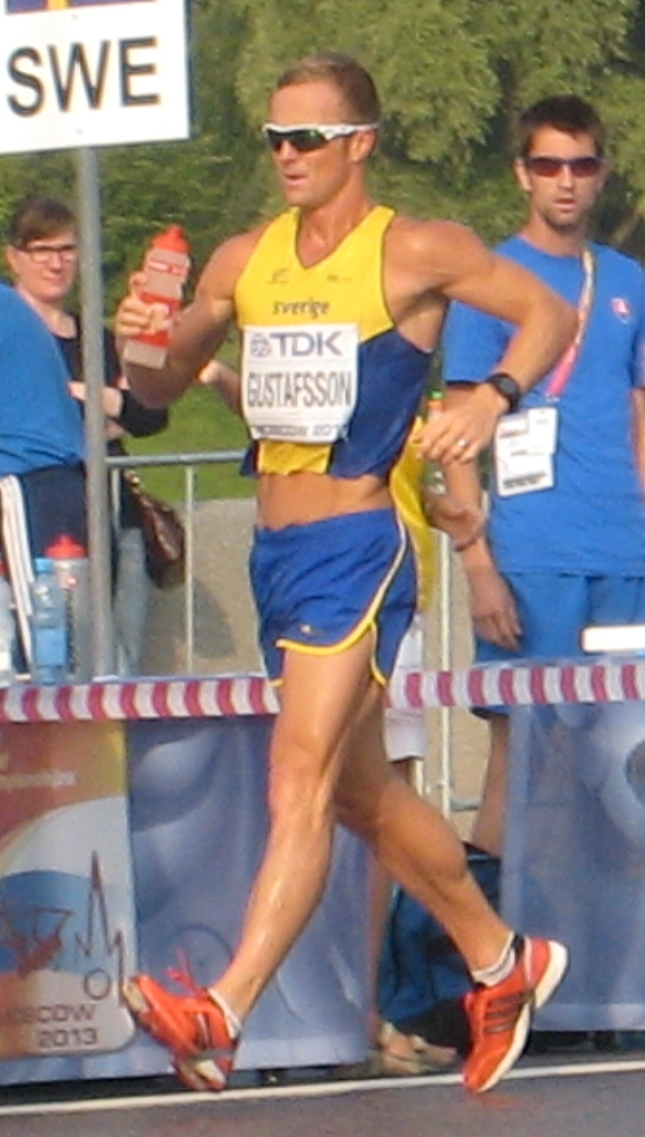
- Gustafsson in 2013

Personal information
- Born: 10 August 1981 (age 45) Gothenburg, Sweden
- Height: 5 ft 11 in (1.80 m)
- Weight: 148 lb (67 kg)

Sport
- Country: Sweden
- Events: 20km walk, 50km walk
- Coached by: Bo Gustafsson

Achievements and titles
- Personal bests: One mile walk (indoor): 5:34:45; 5000 meter walk (indoor): 20:11:20; 3000 meter walk: 11:08:65; 5000 meter walk: 19:24:80; 10,000 meter walk: 39:32:08; 20,000 meter walk: 1:23:43; 10km walk: 40:27; 20km walk: 1:21:51; 50km walk: 3:50:47

Bo Andreas Gustafsson (born 10 August 1981) is a Swedish race walker. He has represented his country at the World Championship in Athletics on four occasions. He qualified for 2 Olympics by making the IAAF standard B in 2008 and IAAF standard A in 2012, but was not selected on the Swedish Olympic Team. His highest accomplishment is a 20th-place finish at the 2009 World Athletics Championships in Berlin, Germany. He was also 12th at the 2010 European Athletics Championships in Barcelona and 21st at the 2011 IAAF World Athletics Championships in Daegu, South Korea.

At the 2012 USATF Pan American race walk trials in Valley Cottage, NY he became the third fastest Swedish race walker in history by walking 3:50:47 in the Men's Open 50 km race which is his Personal Best. In March 2015 the Swedish Sports Confederation announced that they had banned him for two years for testing positive for EPO.

He is a Commercial Pilot by education. His father and coach is Olympic silver medalist Bo Gustafsson.

In 2022, the U.S. Center for SafeSport provisionally suspended Gustafsson for “sexual misconduct.” USA Track & Field told its members that Gustafsson was prohibited “from participating ... in any ... activity, or competition authorized by, organized by or under the auspices of the USOPC, the National Governing Bodies recognized by the USOPC, a Local Affiliated Organization ... or at a facility under the jurisdiction of the same.”

== Athletic career ==
=== College ===
In 2000, Andreas Gustafsson placed 21st at the World Junior Athletics Championships in Santiago, Chile.

=== Professional ===
After college he retired but came back in 2007 and qualified for the World Athletics Championships in Osaka, Japan by placing 26th at the European Cup in a time of 4:00:48 in his 50 km debut.

In 2008 he was qualified to walk the Olympics with an IAAF "B" standard, but was denied a spot by the Swedish Olympic Committee. In 2009 Andreas headed to the World Athletics Championships with the slowest qualifying time but ended up getting 20th in a 3-minute personal best of 3:57:53 out of 47 qualified. His best international accomplishment might have came in Barcelona the next year where he placed 12th at the European Championships in Athletics in a time of 3:58:02 after a battle against Colin Griffin from Ireland who ended up beating him by 4 seconds in the final kilometer.

At the 2011 World Athletics Championships in Daegu he placed 21st. Andreas was qualified for the 2012 Olympic Games in London walking 3:54:08 in Congers, New York, but was rejected for a spot by the Swedish Olympic Committee once again who as a rule only send athletes with a capability of placing at least 8th. He ended the season with a lifetime personal best in 3:50:47 in Valley Cottage, New York.

In 2013, Andreas placed 5th at the 20 kilometer race in Poděbrady, Czech Republic, in a career best of 1:21:51 and was then qualified for both the 20 kilometer and 50 kilometer walk at the World Athletics Championships in Moscow. He ended up getting 39th in the 50 kilometer race in a time of 4:01:40.

In 2014 Andreas won the s Millrose Games beating defending World Champion Robert Heffernan from Ireland in a time of 5:34:45 missing the World Record by 8 tenths of a second. In January 2019, Andreas transferred his allegiance to the United States. On January 25 of 2020, Andreas won the U.S.A Olympic Track & Field Trials in the 50 km Walk in a time of 4 hours, 12 minutes and 11 seconds.

== Achievements ==
Year	Competition	Venue	Position	Event	Notes
Representing Sweden
2000	World Junior Championships in Athletics	Santiago, Chile	21st	10,000 metres walk	45:21
2007	European Race Walking Cup	Leamington Spa, United Kingdom	26th	50 km walk	4:00:48
2009	World Championships in Athletics	Berlin, Germany	20th	50 km walk	3:57:53
2010	European Athletics Championships	Barcelona, Spain	12th	50 km walk	3:58:02
2011	World Championships in Athletics	Daegu, South Korea	21st	50 km walk	4:00:05
2013	World Championships in Athletics	Moscow, Russia	39th	50 km walk	4:01:40

== Personal records ==
Distance	Performance	Location
One mile walk (indoor)	5:34:45	New York City, United States
5000 meter walk (indoor)	20:11:20	Eskilstuna, Sweden
3000 meter walk	11:08:65	San Diego, United States
5000 meter walk	19:24:80	San Diego, United States
10,000 meter walk	39:32:08	Helsinki, Finland
20,000 meter walk	1:23:43	San Diego, United States
10 km walk	40:27	Poděbrady, Czech Republic
20 km walk	1:21:51	Poděbrady, Czech Republic
50 km walk	3:50:47	Valley Cottage, United States

== Doping case ==
In March 2015 Gustafsson was provisionally suspended from sports after a sample from December 2014 had been found positive for a prohibited substance. Gustafsson waived the right to have the B sample tested. On 6 March 2015 the Swedish Sports Confederation announced that they had banned him for two years for testing positive for EPO.

== Personal life ==
Gustafsson was born in Gothenburg, Sweden. When he was 15 years old he moved to Huntington Beach, California, after his mother married an American. He ran track for Mission Viejo High School. He went to School at Utah Valley University graduating with a degree in aviation. He is a commercial pilot.

He is married to his wife Molly and has two boys, Dylan Henning and Elijah David. His father and life-long coach, Bo Gustafsson was an Olympic silver medalist in 1984 in the 50 kilometer walk.
