= Guayaquil Marathon =

Annual marathon in Ecuador

- First Logo of the Guayaquil Marathon.
- Date: October
- Location: Guayaquil, Ecuador
- Event type: Road
- Distance: Marathon, half marathon, 10K
- Primary sponsor: Municipality of Guayaquil
- Established: 2005
- Course records: Men: (Kenya) Reuben Ondari 2:19:27; Women: (Ecuador) Sandra Ruales 2:41:40
- Website: Guayaquil Marathon

The Guayaquil Marathon (Spanish: Maratón de Guayaquil) is a marathon running race in Guayaquil, Ecuador. Held annually on the first Sunday of October, the race draws about 2000 runners. Most participants are from Ecuador; runners from Colombia, Peru, Venezuela, Argentina, Brazil, the United States, Kenya and other countries also register every year.

The route both begins and ends at the 5 de Junio Bridge near the Plaza Rodolfo Baquerizo, located at the Malecon del Salado. The course is mostly flat and visits many important locations in the city, including Parque Centenario, the Iguana Park, the Guayaquil Municipal Museum, the Malecon 2000 that overlooks the Guayas river, the Cerro Santa Ana Tunnels, and the Barcelona Sporting Club Stadium, the Urdesa neighborhood. The race also includes a half marathon distance and a 10K run distance.

The Guayaquil Marathon is hosted by the government of Guayaquil municipality, and is certified by the Association of International Marathons and Distance Races (AIMS). DM3, a sports marketing company from Guayaquil, is in charge of the organization of the race since 2005.

== Men's Open Division ==
Year	Winner	Country	Time	Notes
2005	Juan Carlos Cardona	Colombia	2:20:05	1st Victory
2006	Juan Carlos Cardona	Colombia	2:23:18	2nd Victory
2007	Bayron Piedra	Ecuador	2:20:58	1st Victory
2008	Bayron Piedra	Ecuador	2:20:42	2nd Victory
2009	Reuben Ondari	Kenya	2:19:27	Course Record
2010	Fabián Cajamarca	Ecuador	2:25:52	
2011	Marco Antonio Erazo	Ecuador	2:25:43	
2012	Dimas Quingaluisa	Ecuador	2:26:21	1st Victory
2013	Dimas Quingaluisa	Ecuador	2:22:38	2nd Victory
2014	Dimas Quingaluisa	Ecuador	2:31:43	3rd Victory
2015	Dimas Quingaluisa	Ecuador	2:28:13	4th Victory
2016	Bayron Gutiérrez	Ecuador	2:25:19	
2017	Geoffrey Kiptoo	Kenya	2:26:10	
2018	Christian Vásconez	Ecuador	2:24:14	

== Women's Open Division ==
Year	Winner	Country	Time	Notes
2005	Sandra Ruales	Ecuador	2:41:40	Course Record
2006	Sandra Ruales	Ecuador	2:45:58	2nd Victory
2007	Nancy Rosero	Ecuador	2:49:30	
2008	Sandra Ruales	Ecuador	2:50:40	3rd Victory
2009	Sandra Ruales	Ecuador	2:45:25	4th Victory
2010	Rose Jebet	Kenya	2:45:35	
2011	Nancy Osorio	Ecuador	2:57:24	
2012	Monica Cajamarca	Ecuador	3:03:05	
2013	Olga Tabla	Colombia	2:50:32	
2014	Carmen Molina	Ecuador	3:12:04	
2015	Margaret Toroitich	Kenya	2:48:01	
2016	Angela Brito	Ecuador	2:51:22	
2017	Silvia Paredes	Ecuador	2:58:04	
2018	Silvia Paredes	Ecuador	2:52:27	2nd Victory

== Victories by nationality ==
Country	Men's Open	Women's Open	Total
Ecuador	10	11	21
Kenya	2	2	4
Colombia	2	1	3

== See also ==
- List of marathon races in South America
