= Gabriel Ortiz (racewalking) =

Mexican race walker

Gabriel Antonio Ortiz Tello (born 8 December 1981) is a Mexican race walker who specialized in 20-kilometre (12 mi) races.

== Career ==
He was a native of Chihuahua. In his early career he competed in the 10,000 track walk event at the 2000 World Junior Championships, but was disqualified.

In 2004 he finished twelfth at the IAAF World Race Walking Challenge event in Tijuana, followed by a nineteenth place at the IAAF World Race Walking Cup in Naumburg. In the latter competition, he set his lifetime best in the 20 kilometres walk of 1:21:50 hours. A tenth place at the IAAF World Race Walking Challenge in Tijuana was followed by a 46th place at the same event in Cixi City, a seventh place at the 2005 Pan American Race Walking Cup, a second place at the 2005 Central American and Caribbean Championships, before being disqualified at the 2005 Summer Universiade.

After finishing ninth at the IAAF Race Walking Challenge in Tlalnepantla de Baz he finished fourth at the 2006 Central American and Caribbean Games, sixth at the IAAF Race Walking Challenge in 2007 in Naucalpán and eighth at the 2007 Summer Universiade, he finally qualified for the World Championships. Entering the 20 kilometres walk at the 2007 World Championships, he was disqualified.

His last international placements were a fifteenth place in a 2008 IAAF Race Walking Challenge event in Chihuahua and a 42nd place at the 2008 IAAF World Race Walking Cup in Cheboksary.
