= 1996 World Junior Championships in Athletics – Men's 10,000 metres walk =

The men's 10,000 metres walk event at the 1996 World Junior Championships in Athletics was held in Sydney, Australia, at International Athletic Centre on 22 August.

== Medalists ==
Gold	Francisco Javier Fernández; Spain
Silver	David Márquez; Spain
Bronze	Nathan Deakes; Australia

== Results ==
=== Final ===
22 August

Rank	Name	Nationality	Time	Notes
1st place, gold medalist(s)	Francisco Javier Fernández	Spain	40:38.25	
2nd place, silver medalist(s)	David Márquez	Spain	41:03.73	
3rd place, bronze medalist(s)	Nathan Deakes	Australia	41:11.44	
4	Liu Yunfeng	China	41:20.36	
5	Aleksandr Mironov	Russia	42:01.63	
6	Masato Yoshihara	Japan	42:07.53	
7	Grzegorz Sudoł	Poland	42:12.26	
8	Mario Flores	Mexico	42:40.53	
9	Marius Kristiansen	Norway	43:01.46	
10	Ruslan Alukayev	Russia	43:01.56	
11	Marcus Hackbusch	Germany	43:09.26	
12	Jamie Costin	Ireland	43:20.78	
13	Seiji Matsumoto	Japan	43:35.44	
14	Troy Sundstrom	Australia	43:46.02	
15	Tomás Hlavenka	Czech Republic	43:47.07	
16	Arturo Chora	Mexico	43:57.77	
17	Nuno Pereira	Portugal	44:03.00	
18	Luís Correia	Portugal	44:30.95	
19	Sven Albrecht	Germany	44:32.33	
20	Joe Ryan	Ireland	46:33.88	
21	Jairoj Kumar Jeyabal	Singapore	47:17.88	
22	Teoh Boon Lim	Malaysia	48:44.43	
23	Ivan Gutz	Brazil	49:43.65	
	Rodrigo de Araújo	Brazil	DQ	

== Participation ==
According to an unofficial count, 24 athletes from 15 countries participated in the event.

- Australia (2)
- Brazil (2)
- China (1)
- Czech Republic (1)
- Germany (2)
- Ireland (2)
- Japan (2)
- Malaysia (1)
- Mexico (2)
- Norway (1)
- Poland (1)
- Portugal (2)
- Russia (2)
- Singapore (1)
- Spain (2)
