= Kim Dong-young (race walker) =

South Korean racewalker (born 1980)

Personal information
- Born: March 6, 1980 (age 45) Busan, South Korea
- Height: 1.76 m (5 ft 9 1/2 in)
- Weight: 65 kg (143 lb)

Sport
- Country: South Korea
- Sport: Athletics
- Event: 50km Race Walk

- Kim Dong-young
- Hangul: 김동영
- RR: Gim Dongyeong
- MR: Kim Tongyŏng

Kim Dong-Young (born 6 March 1980) is a South Korean race walker.

== Achievements ==
Year	Competition	Venue	Position	Event	Notes
Representing South Korea
2001	Universiade	Beijing, China	12th	20 km	1:30:03
2002	Asian Games	Busan, South Korea	4th	20 km	1:26:04
2003	Universiade	Daegu, South Korea	–	20 km	DQ
2004	World Race Walking Cup	Naumburg, Germany	17th	50 km	3:58:00
2004	Olympic Games	Athens, Greece	27th	50 km	4:05:16
2005	World Championships	Helsinki, Finland	16th	50 km	4:01:25
2006	World Race Walking Cup	A Coruña, Spain	34th	50 km	4:07:59
2008	Olympic Games	Beijing, China	31st	50 km	4:02:32
2010	Asian Games	Guangzhou, China	5th	50 km	3:53:52
2011	World Championships	Daegu, South Korea	14th	50 km	3:51:12
2012	World Race Walking Cup	Saransk, Russia	22nd	50 km	3:56:12
2012	Olympic Games	London, United Kingdom	38th	50 km	3:57:33
