= 1998 World Junior Championships in Athletics – Men's 10,000 metres walk =

The men's 10,000 metres walk event at the 1998 World Junior Championships in Athletics was held in Annecy, France, at Parc des Sports on 30 July.

== Medalists ==
Gold	Roman Rasskazov; Russia
Silver	Liu Yunfeng; China
Bronze	Mario Flores; Mexico

== Results ==
=== Final ===
30 July

Rank	Name	Nationality	Time	Notes
1st place, gold medalist(s)	Roman Rasskazov	Russia	41:55.95	
2nd place, silver medalist(s)	Liu Yunfeng	China	42:01.11	
3rd place, bronze medalist(s)	Mario Flores	Mexico	42:04.55	
4	Juan Manuel Molina	Spain	42:09.75	
5	Li Guoqing	China	42:20.25	
6	Marcus Hackbusch	Germany	42:46.81	
7	Yevgeniy Yakovlev	Russia	43:23.81	
8	Xavier Moreno	Ecuador	43:52.61	
9	Sin Il-Yong	South Korea	44:11.96	
10	Liam Murphy	Australia	44:20.85	
11	Troy Sundstrom	Australia	44:45.92	
12	Maik Berger	Germany	44:56.27	
13	Aivars Kadaks	Latvia	45:04.13	
14	Andrey Stepanchuk	Belarus	45:18.19	
15	José Ignacio Aledo	Spain	45:36.05	
16	Takeshi Maruyama	Japan	45:44.33	
17	Milos Bátovsky	Slovakia	46:08.36	
18	Ivan Shuler	Belarus	46:10.13	
19	Ricardo Vendeira	Portugal	46:10.74	
20	Mickael Rousseau	France	46:19.84	
21	Snorre Utaker	Norway	47:02.61	
22	David Kidd	Ireland	47:10.68	
23	Roman Criollo	Ecuador	47:52.68	
24	Lema Abera	Ethiopia	48:18.83	
25	Anatolijus Launikonis	Lithuania	48:23.28	
26	Erik Tysse	Norway	49:28.12	
27	Michael Kemp	United Kingdom	49:40.40	
28	Mohd Shahrul Haizy	Malaysia	50:40.18	
29	Pavel Svoboda	Czech Republic	52:57.50	
	Nuno Pereira	Portugal	DQ	
	Kazuya Terashima	Japan	DQ	
	Mário dos Santos	Brazil	DNF	
	Viktor Jansson	Sweden	DNF	

== Participation ==
According to an unofficial count, 33 athletes from 23 countries participated in the event.

- Australia (2)
- Belarus (2)
- Brazil (1)
- China (2)
- Czech Republic (1)
- Ecuador (2)
- Ethiopia (1)
- France (1)
- Germany (2)
- Ireland (1)
- Japan (2)
- Latvia (1)
- Lithuania (1)
- Malaysia (1)
- Mexico (1)
- Norway (2)
- Portugal (2)
- Russia (2)
- Slovakia (1)
- South Korea (1)
- Spain (2)
- Sweden (1)
- United Kingdom (1)
