= Rafał Augustyn (race walker) =

Polish race walker (born 1984)

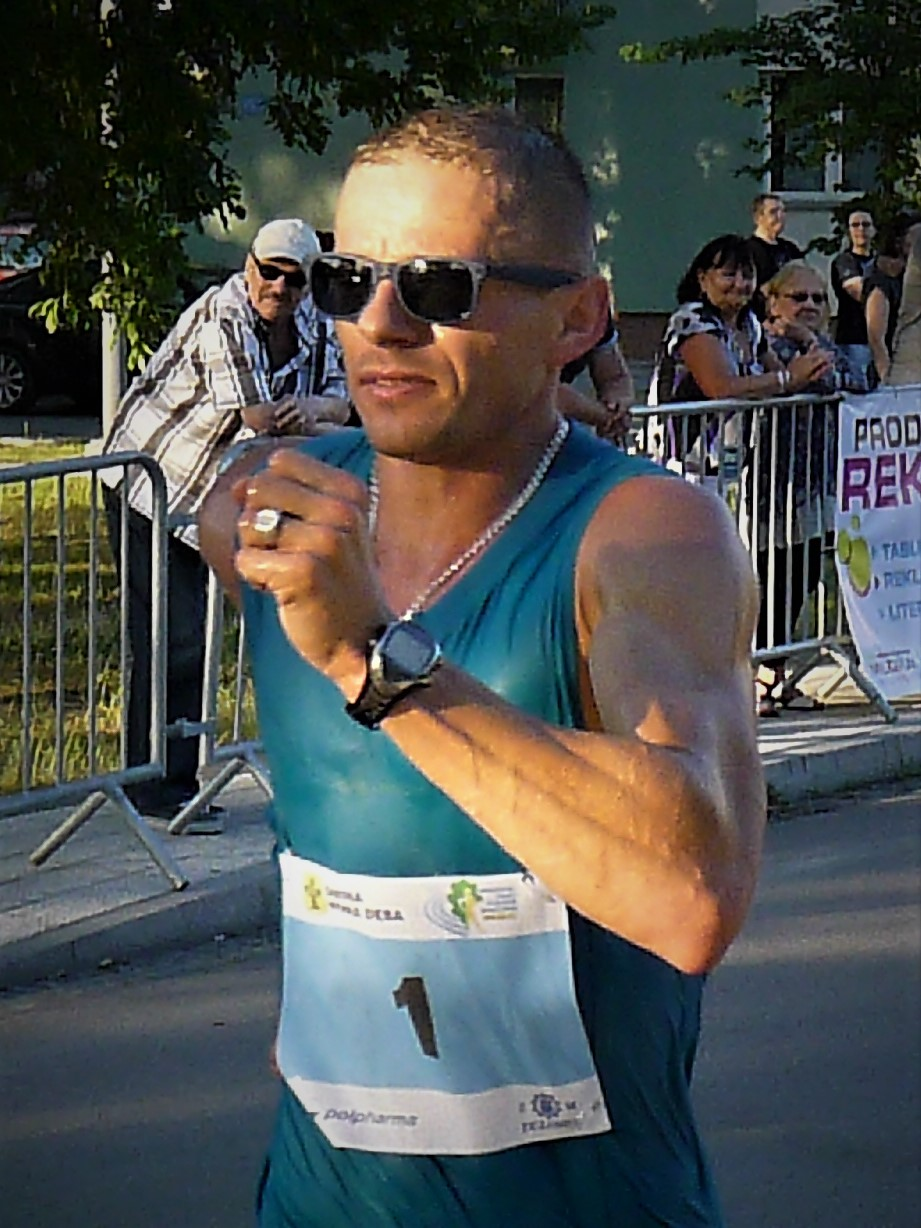

Personal information
- Nationality: Polish
- Born: 14 May 1984 (age 42) Dębica, Poland
- Height: 1.79 m (5 ft 10 in)
- Weight: 73 kg (161 lb)

Sport
- Sport: Athletics
- Event: Race walking
- Club: OTG Sokół Mielec

Rafał Augustyn (born 14 May 1984) is a Polish race walker.

== Achievements ==
Year	Competition	Venue	Position	Event	Notes
Representing Poland
2003	European Race Walking Cup	Cheboksary, Russia	9th	10 km walk	42:56
2003	European Junior Championships	Tampere, Finland	—	10,000 m walk	DNF
2004	World Race Walking Cup	Naumburg, Germany	—	50 km walk	DNF
2005	European Race Walking Cup	Miskolc, Hungary	—	20 km walk	DQ
2005	European U23 Championships	Erfurt, Germany	4th	20 km walk	1:25:01
2005	Universiade	İzmir, Turkey	13th	20 km walk	1:30:56
2006	World Race Walking Cup	A Coruña, Spain	26th	20 km walk	1:23:16
2007	European Race Walking Cup	Royal Leamington Spa, United Kingdom	16th	20 km walk	1:22:08
2007	Universiade	Bangkok, Thailand	15th	20 km walk	1:31:46
2007	World Championships	Osaka, Japan	26th	20 km walk	1:27:54
2008	World Race Walking Cup	Cheboksary, Russia	55th	20 km walk	1:25:45
2008	Olympic Games	Beijing, China	29th	20 km walk	1:24:25
2009	European Race Walking Cup	Metz, France	7th	20 km walk	1:26:06
2009	European Race Walking Cup	Metz, France	3rd	Team – 20 km	40 pts
2009	Universiade	Belgrade, Serbia	8th	20 km walk	1:23:00
2009	World Championships	Berlin, Germany	22nd	50 km walk	3:58:30
2010	World Race Walking Cup	Chihuahua, Mexico	16th	20 km walk	1:25:28
2010	European Championships	Barcelona, Spain	10th	20 km walk	1:22:40
2011	European Race Walking Cup	Olhão, Portugal	6th	50 km walk	3:54:38
2011	European Race Walking Cup	Olhão, Portugal	2nd	Team – 50 km	17 pts
2011	World Championships	Daegu, South Korea	24th	20 km walk	1:24:47
2012	World Race Walking Cup	Saransk, Russia	9th	50 km walk	3:49:53
2012	Olympic Games	London, United Kingdom	29th	20 km walk	1:23:17
2013	European Race Walking Cup	Dudince, Slovakia	8th	20 km walk	1:23:16
2013	European Race Walking Cup	Dudince, Slovakia	3rd	Team – 20 km	44 pts
2013	World Championships	Moscow, Russia	19th	20 km walk	1:24:03
2014	World Race Walking Cup	Taicang, China	56th	20 km walk	1:23:53
2014	European Championships	Zurich, Switzerland	9th	50 km walk	3:48:15
2015	European Race Walking Cup	Murcia, Spain	17th	20 km walk	1:23:59
2015	World Championships	Beijing, China	28th	50 km walk	3:57:30

== Personal bests ==
Outdoor

- 3000 m walk – 11:17.82 (Sosnowiec 2011)
- 5000 m walk – 19:26.55 (Kraków 2011)
- 10,000 m walk – 40:37.73 (Warsaw 2006)
- 10 km walk – 39:47 (Kraków 2010)
- 20 km walk – 1:20:53 (Zaniemyśl 2012)
- 50 km walk – 3:43:55 (Dudince 2015)

Indoor

- 5000 m walk – 19:16.51 (Sopot 2014)
