= Claudia Herrera =

Chilean footballer

Personal information
- Full name: Claudia Gabriela Herrera Muñoz
- Date of birth: 24 June 1997 (age 29)
- Place of birth: Valparaíso, Chile
- Position: Midfielder

Youth career
- Santiago Wanderers

Senior career*
| Years | Team | Apps | (Gls) |
| 2016–2018 | Santiago Wanderers | | |
| 2018–2021 | Everton | | |
| 2022–2023 | Palestino | | |
| 2024–2026 | Universidad de Chile | 32 | (1) |

International career^{‡}
| 2023– | Chile | 1 | (0) |
- * Club domestic league appearances and goals ‡ National team caps and goals as of 18 January 2024

Claudia Gabriela Herrera Muñoz (born 24 June 1997), also known as Gabriela Herrera, is a Chilean footballer who plays as a midfielder.

== Club career ==
A product of Santiago Wanderers, Herrera played for them from 2016 to 2018 at senior level. Subsequently, she switched to Everton, the classic rival.

In 2022, she moved to Santiago and joined Palestino. In the 2023 season, she made eighteen appearances and scored three goals.

In 2024, she switched to Universidad de Chile. She left them at the end of the 2026 season.

== International career ==
Herrera received her first called up to the Chile national team in September 2023 under Luis Mena and made her debut in a 3–0 win against New Zealand in the same month.

== Personal life ==
She is nicknamed Gabi, a hypocoristic of "Gabriela", her middle name.
