= Miriam Ramón =

Ecuadorian race walker (born 1973)

Personal information
- Full name: Miriam Elitsavet Ramón Duran
- Born: February 10, 1973 (age 53) Cuenca, Azuay, Ecuador
- Height: 1.58 m (5 ft 2 in)
- Weight: 50 kg (110 lb)

Sport
- Country: Ecuador
- Sport: Women's Athletics
- Retired: December 16, 2010 (age 37)

Achievements and titles
- Olympic finals: 1992 Summer Olympics
Medal record
Race walking
Representing Ecuador
South American Games
Bronze medal – third place	1998 Cuenca	10 km
Bolivarian Games
Gold medal – first place	1989 Maracaibo	10 km
Silver medal – second place	1993 Cochabamba	10 km
Bronze medal – third place	1997 Arequipa	10 km
South American Race Walking Cup
Gold medal – first place	1994 Sucre	10 km
South American Youth Championships
Gold medal – first place	1988 Cuenca	3 km
- Updated on 9 May 2013

Miriam Elitsavet Ramón Duran (born February 10, 1973) is an Ecuadorian retired race walker.

== Career ==
She represented her native country at the 1992 Summer Olympics.

== Achievements ==
Year	Competition	Venue	Position	Event	Notes
Representing Ecuador
1988	South American Youth Championships	Cuenca, Ecuador	1st	3000 m	15:19.1 min A
1989	South American Championships	Medellín, Colombia	1st	10,000 m	50:30.3 min A CR
1989	Bolivarian Games	Maracaibo, Venezuela	1st	10,000 m	46:15.2 min
1990	Ibero-American Championships	Manaus, Brazil	4th	10,000 m	53:18.80 min
1990	World Junior Championships	Plovdiv, Bulgaria	4th	5000 m	22:51.10 min
1991	World Indoor Championships	Seville, Spain	10th	3000 m	13:24.95 min
1991	South American Championships	Manaus, Brazil	4th	10,000 m	54:39.1
1992	Ibero-American Championships	Seville, Spain	3rd	10,000 m	48:13.74 min
1992	1992 Summer Olympic	Barcelona, Spain	36th	10 km	51:56 min
1992	World Junior Championships	Seoul, South Korea	12th	5000 m	23:02.03 min
1993	Bolivarian Games	Cochabamba, Bolivia	2nd	10 km	48:47 min A
1993	South American Championships	Lima, Peru	1st	10,000 m	48:18.0 min CR
1993	World Championships	Stuttgart, Germany	16th	10 km	46:13 min
1994	Ibero-American Championships	Mar del Plata, Argentina	2nd	10,000 m	47:01.83 min
1994	South American Race Walking Cup	Sucre, Bolivia	1st	10 km	
1995	Pan American Games	Mar del Plata, Argentina	6th	10,000 m	50:13 min
1995	South American Championships	Manaus, Brazil	1st	10,000 m	49:26.4 min
1995	World Championships	Gothenburg, Sweden	25th	10 km	45:04 min
1997	South American Championships	Mar del Plata, Argentina	2nd	10 km	46:50.6 min
1997	Bolivarian Games	Arequipa, Peru	3rd	10 km	52:49 min A
1998	South American Games	Cuenca, Ecuador	3rd	10 km	48:30 min A
1999	South American Championships	Bogotá, Colombia	1st	20 km	1:39:27.0 hrs A CR
2005	Pan American Race Walking Cup	Lima, Peru	2nd	20 km	1:31:25 hrs
2005	World Championships	Helsinki, Finland	—	20 km	DNF
2007	Pan American Race Walking Cup	Balneário Camboriú, Brazil	2nd	20 km	1:39:43 hrs
2007	World Championships	Osaka, Japan	—	20 km	DSQ
2007	Pan American Games	Rio de Janeiro, Brazil	2nd	20 km	1:40:03 hrs
