= Sandra Ruales =

Ecuadorian long-distance runner

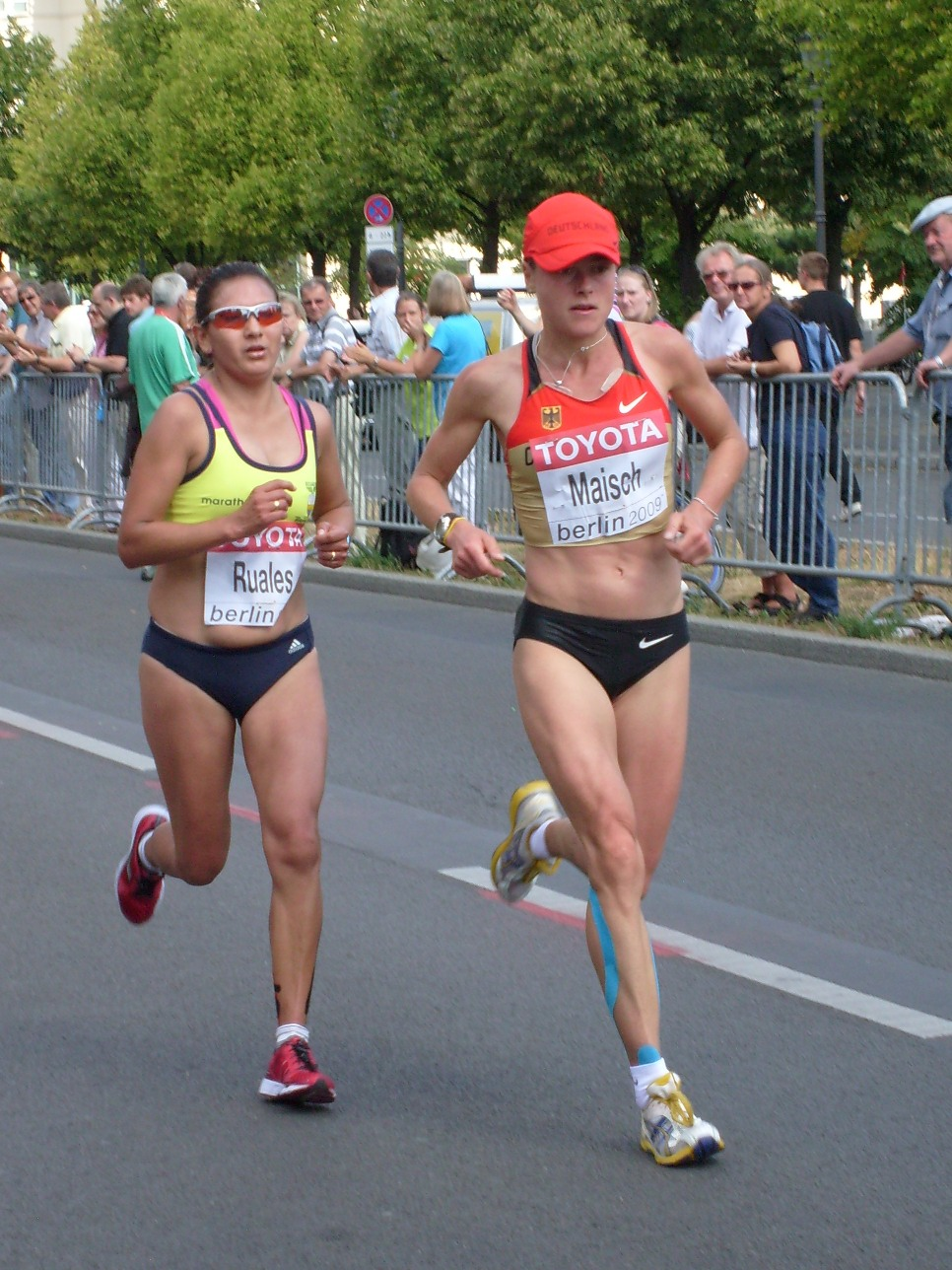
- Sandra Ruales (2009)

Personal information
- Full name: Sandra de las Mercedes Ruales Mosquera
- Born: 30 May 1974 (age 52) Quito, Pichincha, Ecuador
- Height: 1.61 m (5 ft 3 in)
- Weight: 53 kg (117 lb)

Sport
- Country: Ecuador
- Sport: Athletics
Medal record
Women's athletics
Representing Ecuador
Bolivarian Games
Gold medal – first place	2005 Armenia	Half marathon
South American Youth Championships
Silver medal – second place	1988 Cuenca	1500 m
Silver medal – second place	1988 Cuenca	3000 m

Sandra de las Mercedes Ruales Mosquera (born 30 May 1974 in Quito, Pichincha) is an Ecuadorian long-distance runner.

She twice competed for her native country at the Summer Olympics: 2004 and 2008. Ruales won the 2005, 2006, 2008 and 2009 edition of the Guayaquil Marathon.

== International competitions ==
Year	Competition	Venue	Position	Event	Notes
Representing Ecuador
1988	Ibero-American Championships	Mexico City, Mexico	5th	10,000m	38:37.21 min A
1988	South American Youth Championships	Cuenca, Ecuador	2nd	1500 m	4:55.8 min A
1988	South American Youth Championships	Cuenca, Ecuador	2nd	3000 m	10:44.5 min A
1989	South American Championships	Medellín, Colombia	2nd	10,000 m	35:55.2 min
1990	World Junior Championships	Plovdiv, Bulgaria	13th	10,000 m	36:06.61 min
1991	South American Championships	Manaus, Brazil	4th	3000 m	9:46.00 min
1991	South American Championships	Manaus, Brazil	3rd	10,000 m	34:57.00 min
2004	Miami Marathon	Miami, United States	3rd	Marathon	2:45:24 hrs
2004	Olympic Games	Athens, Greece	36th	Marathon	2:44:28 hrs
2005	Miami Marathon	Miami, United States	1st	Marathon	2:37:00 hrs
2005	World Championships	Helsinki, Finland	—	Marathon	DNF
2005	Guayaquil Marathon	Guayaquil, Ecuador	1st	Marathon	2:41:40 hrs
2005	Bolivarian Games	Armenia, Colombia	1st	Half marathon	1:20:12 hrs GR A
2006	Miami Marathon	Miami, United States	2nd	Marathon	2:37:18 hrs
2006	Guayaquil Marathon	Guayaquil, Ecuador	1st	Marathon	2:45:58 hrs
2008	Olympic Games	Beijing, PR China	43rd	Marathon	2:35:53 hrs
2008	Guayaquil Marathon	Guayaquil, Ecuador	1st	Marathon	2:50:40 hrs
2009	Miami Marathon	Miami, United States	3rd	Marathon	2:50:38 hrs
2009	World Championships	Berlin, Germany	57th	Marathon	2:50:36 hrs
2009	Guayaquil Marathon	Guayaquil, Ecuador	1st	Marathon	2:45:25 hrs
