= 2001 European Athletics U23 Championships =

3rd European Athletics U23 Championships
- Dates: 12–15 July 2001
- Host city: Amsterdam, Netherlands
- Venue: Olympisch Stadion
- Level: U23
- Type: Outdoor
- Events: 44
- Participation: 737 athletes from 41 nations

The 3rd European Athletics U23 Championships were held in Amsterdam, Netherlands, at Olympisch Stadion on 12–15 July 2001.

== Results ==
Complete results and medal winners were published.

=== Men ===
Event	Gold		Silver		Bronze	
100 metres	Jonathan Barbour; Great Britain	10.26	Fabrice Calligny; France	10.40	Przemysław Rogowski; Poland	10.45
200 metres	Marcin Jędrusiński; Poland	20.94	Łukasz Chyła; Poland	20.99	Mark Howard; Ireland	21.00
400 metres	Yuriy Borzakovskiy; Russia	46.06	Marc Alexander Scheer; Germany	46.43	Rafał Wieruszewski; Poland	46.57
800 metres	Antonio Manuel Reina; Spain	1:47.74	Joeri Jansen; Belgium	1:47.80	Nicolas Aïssat; France	1:47.81
1500 metres	Wolfram Müller; Germany	3:38.94	Ivan Heshko; Ukraine	3:39.37	Sergio Gallardo; Spain	3:39.50
5000 metres	Yousef El Nasri; Spain	14:02.97	Dmytro Baranovskyy; Ukraine	14:03.67	Balázs Csillag; Hungary	14:04.84
10,000 metres	Dmytro Baranovskyy; Ukraine	29:13.36	Koen Raymaekers; Netherlands	29:15.24	Mattia Maccagnan; Italy	29:15.32
110 metres hurdles	Artur Budziłło; Poland	13.76	Felipe Vivancos; Spain	13.79	Chris Baillie; Great Britain	13.85
400 metres hurdles	Matthew Elias; Great Britain	49.57	Periklis Iakovakis; Greece	49.63	Mikael Jakobsson; Sweden	50.86
3000 metres steeplechase	Pavel Potapovich; Russia	8:35.85	Vadim Slobodenyuk; Ukraine	8:37.09	Henrik Skoog; Sweden	8:38.27
20 kilometres walk	Juan Manuel Molina; Spain	1:23:03	Stepan Yudin; Russia	1:23:10	José David Domínguez; Spain	1:23:16
4 × 100 metres relay	Poland; Tomasz Kondratowicz; Łukasz Chyła; Marcin Placheta; Przemysław Rogowski	39.41	Great Britain; Jonathan O'Parka; Jonathan Barbour; Darren Chin; Ben Lewis	39.45	Slovenia; Matic Šušteršic; Matic Osovnikar; Boštjan Fridrih; Rok Orel	39.95
4 × 400 metres relay	Great Britain; David Naismith; Adam Potter; Richard McDonald; Matthew Elias	3:05.24	Germany; Simon Kirch; Stefan Holz; Ruwen Faller; Marc Alexander Scheer	3:05.39	Russia; Oleg Mishukov; Maksim Babarykin; Dmitriy Bogdanov; Yevgeniy Lebedev	3:06.41
High jump	Rožle Prezelj; Slovenia	2.21	Aleksandr Veryutin; Belarus	2.18	Fabrice Saint Jean; France	2.18
Pole vault	Lars Börgeling; Germany	5.60	Mikko Latvala; Finland	5.50	Giuseppe Gibilisco; Italy	5.50
Long jump	Yann Domenech; France	8.00	Volodymyr Zyuskov; Ukraine	7.90	Schahriar Bigdeli; Germany	7.81
Triple jump	Christian Olsson; Sweden	17.24	Igor Spasovkhodskiy; Russia	17.08	Ionut Punga; Romania	16.81
Shot put	Mikuláš Konopka; Slovakia	19.79	Yury Bialou; Belarus	19.38	Leszek Śliwa; Poland	19.08
Discus throw	Zoltán Kővágó; Hungary	63.85	Heinrich Seitz; Germany	59.50	Gábor Máté; Hungary	59.45
Hammer throw	Nicolas Figère; France	80.88	Olli-Pekka Karjalainen; Finland	80.54	Miloslav Konopka; Slovakia	76.28
Javelin throw	Björn Lange; Germany	80.85	Alexander Baranovskiy; Russia	76.74	Janis Liepa; Latvia	74.26
Decathlon	André Niklaus; Germany	8042	Jaakko Ojaniemi; Finland	7907	William Frullani; Italy	7871

=== Women ===
Event	Gold		Silver		Bronze	
100 metres	Sina Schielke; Germany	11.52	Abiodun Oyepitan; Great Britain	11.58	Johanna Manninen; Finland	11.61
200 metres	Johanna Manninen; Finland	23.30	Sina Schielke; Germany	23.45	Ciara Sheehy; Ireland	23.54
400 metres	Antonina Yefremova; Ukraine	52.29	Helen Thieme; Great Britain	52.75	Aneta Lemiesz; Poland	53.25
800 metres	Anna Zagorska; Poland	2:07.27	Irina Somesan; Romania	2:07.27	Tatyana Rodionova; Russia	2:07.60
1500 metres	Alesia Turava; Belarus	4:09.71	Natalia Rodríguez; Spain	4:11.20	Kelly Caffel; Great Britain	4:12.30
5000 metres	Katalin Szentgyörgy; Hungary	15:40.55	Anastasiya Zubova; Russia	15:40.78	Tatyana Khmeleva; Russia	15:51.88
10,000 metres	Olga Romanova; Russia	33:36.03	Sonja Stolić; Yugoslavia	33:37.02	Sabrina Mockenhaupt; Germany	33:38.38
100 metres hurdles	Susanna Kallur; Sweden	12.96	Jenny Kallur; Sweden	13.19	Tessy Prediger; Germany	13.31
400 metres hurdles	Sylvanie Morandais; France	56.30	Aleksandra Pielużek; Poland	56.51	Irēna Žauna; Latvia	57.03
3000 metres steeplechase	Melanie Schulz; Germany	10:03.34	Lívia Tóth; Hungary	10:04.99	Sigrid Vanden Bempt; Belgium	10:08.46
20 kilometres walk	Elisa Rigaudo; Italy	1:29:54	Ryta Turava; Belarus	1:30:15	Larissa Sofronova; Russia	1:32:06
4 × 100 metres relay	Great Britain; Susan Burnside; Helen Roscoe; Sabrina Scott; Abiodun Oyepitan	44.31	Belarus; Yuliya Bartsevich; Aksana Drahun; Alena Neumiarzhitskaya; Yevgeniya Likhuta	44.64	Finland; Elina Lax; Heidi Hannula; Johanna Manninen; Katja Salivaara	44.76
4 × 400 metres relay	Great Britain; Karen Gear; Jenny Meadows; Tracey Duncan; Helen Thieme	3:31.74	Poland; Aleksandra Pielużek; Aneta Lemiesz; Monika Bejnar; Justyna Karolkiewicz	3:32.38	Ukraine; Natalya Zhuravlyova; Natalya Sidorenko; Yuliya Gurtovenko; Antonina Yefremova	3:34.16
High jump	Ruth Beitia; Spain	1.87	Marina Kuptsova; Russia; Candeger Kilincer; Turkey	1.87		
Pole vault	Monika Pyrek; Poland	4.40	Annika Becker; Germany	4.40	Carolin Hingst; Germany	4.30
Long jump	Jade Johnson; Great Britain	6.52	Concepción Montaner; Spain	6.46	Aurélie Felix; France	6.41
Triple jump	Irina Vasilieva; Russia	13.80	Marija Martinović; Yugoslavia	13.72	Amy Zongo; France	13.68
Shot put	Nadzeya Astapchuk; Belarus	19.73	Lucica Ciobanu; Romania	17.59	Kathleen Kluge; Germany	17.06
Discus throw	Mélina Robert-Michon; France	58.52	Ileana Brindusoiu; Romania	58.25	Olga Goncharenko; Belarus	57.71
Hammer throw	Manuela Montebrun; France	66.73	Sini Pöyry; Finland	64.71	Cecilia Nilsson; Sweden	64.06
Javelin throw	Nikolett Szabó; Hungary	60.69	Mercedes Chilla; Spain	57.78	Moonika Aava; Estonia	56.12
Heptathlon	Līga Kļaviņa; Latvia	6279	Svetlana Sokolova; Russia	6179	Austra Skujytė; Lithuania	6087

== Medal table ==
* Host nation (Netherlands)

Rank	Nation	Gold	Silver	Bronze	Total
1	Germany	6	5	5	16
2	Great Britain	6	3	2	11
3	Poland	5	3	4	12
4	France	5	1	4	10
5	Russia	4	6	4	14
6	Spain	4	4	2	10
7	Hungary	3	1	2	6
8	Belarus	2	4	1	7
8	Ukraine	2	4	1	7
10	Sweden	2	1	3	6
11	Finland	1	4	2	7
12	Italy	1	0	3	4
13	Latvia	1	0	2	3
14	Slovakia	1	0	1	2
14	Slovenia	1	0	1	2
16	Romania	0	3	1	4
17	Yugoslavia	0	2	0	2
18	Belgium	0	1	1	2
19	Greece	0	1	0	1
19	Netherlands*	0	1	0	1
19	Turkey	0	1	0	1
22	Ireland	0	0	2	2
23	Estonia	0	0	1	1
23	Lithuania	0	0	1	1
Totals (24 entries)		44	45	43	132

== Participation ==
According to an unofficial count, 737 athletes from 41 countries participated in the event.

- Armenia (1)
- Austria (9)
- Azerbaijan (2)
- Belarus (27)
- Belgium (11)
- Bosnia and Herzegovina (2)
- Bulgaria (5)
- Croatia (8)
- Cyprus (1)
- Czech Republic (20)
- Denmark (1)
- Estonia (7)
- Finland (29)
- France (73)
- Germany (71)
- Great Britain (50)
- Greece (27)
- Hungary (25)
- Iceland (3)
- Ireland (13)
- Israel (1)
- Italy (38)
- Latvia (10)
- Lithuania (14)
- Luxembourg (1)
- Moldova (3)
- Netherlands (23)
- Norway (9)
- Poland (45)
- Portugal (16)
- Romania (25)
- Russia (36)
- San Marino (1)
- Slovakia (8)
- Slovenia (13)
- Spain (45)
- Sweden (27)
- Switzerland (8)
- Turkey (4)
- Ukraine (20)
- Yugoslavia (5)
