= 1998 European Race Walking Cup =

- Organisers: EAA
- Edition: 2nd
- Dates: 25 April
- Host city: Dudince, Banská Bystrica Region, Slovakia
- Events: 3
- Participation: 208 athletes from 29 nations

The 1998 European Race Walking Cup was held in Dudince, Slovakia, on 25 April 1998.

Complete results were published. Medal winners were published on the Athletics Weekly website,

== Medallists ==
Event	Gold		Silver		Bronze	
Men
20 km walk	Paquillo Fernández (ESP)	1:20:31	Robert Korzeniowski (POL)	1:20:40	Aigars Fadejevs (LAT)	1:20:44
50 km walk	Tomasz Lipiec (POL)	3:42:57	Jesús Ángel García (ESP)	3:43:17	Giovanni Perricelli (ITA)	3:44:17
Team (Men)
Team 20 km	Belarus	18 pts	Spain	24 pts	Germany	55 pts
Team 50 km	Spain	21 pts	Italy	38 pts	Slovakia	64 pts
Team Combined	Spain	45 pts	Belarus	90 pts	Germany	119 pts
Women
10 km walk	Nadezhda Ryashkina (RUS)	43:06	Mária Rosza-Urbanik (HUN)	43:08	Claudia Iovan (ROU)	43:12
Team (Women)
Team (Women)	Russia	15 pts	Italy	36 pts	Spain	41 pts

== Results ==
=== Men's 20 km ===
Place	Athlete	Nation	Time
1st place, gold medalist(s)	Paquillo Fernández	Spain (ESP)	1:20:31
2nd place, silver medalist(s)	Robert Korzeniowski	Poland (POL)	1:20:40
3rd place, bronze medalist(s)	Aigars Fadejevs	Latvia (LAT)	1:20:44
4	Andreas Erm	Germany (GER)	1:21:12
5	Andrey Makarov	Belarus (BLR)	1:21:27
6	Artur Meleshkevich	Belarus (BLR)	1:21:46
7	Yevgeniy Misyulya	Belarus (BLR)	1:21:55
8	Denis Langlois	France (FRA)	1:21:56
9	Robert Ihly	Germany (GER)	1:22:16
10	Valentí Massana	Spain (ESP)	1:22:19
11	Jiří Malysa	Czech Republic (CZE)	1:22:34
12	Dmitriy Yesipchuk	Russia (RUS)	1:22:35
13	Fernando Vázquez	Spain (ESP)	1:22:39
14	Gyula Dudás	Hungary (HUN)	1:22:49
15	Vladimir Andreyev	Russia (RUS)	1:23:15
16	Silviu Casandra	Romania (ROU)	1:23:26
17	Sándor Urbanik	Hungary (HUN)	1:23:37
18	José Urbano	Portugal (POR)	1:23:39
19	Alessandro Gandellini	Italy (ITA)	1:24:14
20	Modris Liepiņš	Latvia (LAT)	1:24:24
21	Róbert Valíček	Slovakia (SVK)	1:24:53
22	Mikhail Khmelnitskiy	Belarus (BLR)	1:25:10
23	Massimo Fizialetti	Italy (ITA)	1:25:23
24	David Márquez	Spain (ESP)	1:25:37
25	Jiří Masita	Czech Republic (CZE)	1:25:46
26	João Vieira	Portugal (POR)	1:25:55
27	Anthony Gillet	France (FRA)	1:26:19
28	Augusto Cardoso	Portugal (POR)	1:26:32
29	Andriy Kovenko	Ukraine (UKR)	1:27:07
30	Birger Fält	Sweden (SWE)	1:27:29
31	Renat Alukayev	Russia (RUS)	1:27:48
32	Jacek Müller	Poland (POL)	1:28:00
33	Trond Nymark	Norway (NOR)	1:28:01
34	Costică Bălan	Romania (ROU)	1:28:06
35	Eddy Riva	France (FRA)	1:28:12
36	Marek Janek	Slovakia (SVK)	1:28:20
37	Kristian Lunde Lyssand	Norway (NOR)	1:28:50
38	Spiros Kastanis	Greece (GRE)	1:28:57
39	Martin Bell	Great Britain (GBR)	1:29:18
40	Pascal Servanty	France (FRA)	1:29:23
41	Sigitas Vainauskas	Lithuania (LTU)	1:29:47
42	Michael Lohse	Germany (GER)	1:30:26
43	Leonid Mizernyuk	Ukraine (UKR)	1:30:29
44	Gintaras Andriuškevičius	Lithuania (LTU)	1:31:07
45	Nikolay Kalitka	Ukraine (UKR)	1:31:13
46	Fedosei Ciumacenco	Moldova (MDA)	1:31:24
47	Pascal Charrière	Switzerland (SUI)	1:31:36
48	Grzegorz Sudoł	Poland (POL)	1:31:43
49	Miroslav Bosko	Slovakia (SVK)	1:32:09
50	Harold van Beek	Netherlands (NED)	1:32:20
51	Tomáš Kratochvíl	Czech Republic (CZE)	1:32:51
52	Viktoras Meškauskas	Lithuania (LTU)	1:33:00
53	Abdülkadir Öz	Turkey (TUR)	1:33:11
54	Arne Johan Martinsen	Norway (NOR)	1:34:12
55	Mike Trautmann	Germany (GER)	1:34:48
56	Martin Pupiš	Slovakia (SVK)	1:35:46
57	Aivars Kadaks	Latvia (LAT)	1:36:07
58	Andreas Paspaliaris	Greece (GRE)	1:37:04
59	Anatolijus Launikonis	Lithuania (LTU)	1:38:08
60	Hubert Sonnek	Czech Republic (CZE)	1:39:01
61	Zoltán Börcsöl	Hungary (HUN)	1:39:51
62	Stephan Wögerbauer	Austria (AUT)	1:41:20
63	Erik Tysse	Norway (NOR)	1:42:02
64	Dietmar Hirschmugl	Austria (AUT)	1:52:00
—	Johann Siegele	Austria (AUT)	DQ
—	Wilfried Siegele	Austria (AUT)	DQ
—	Yevgeniy Smalyuk	Russia (RUS)	DQ
—	Bengt Bengtsson	Sweden (SWE)	DQ
—	Jan Staaf	Sweden (SWE)	DQ
—	Thomas Christensen	Denmark (DEN)	DNF
—	Karsten Gotfredsen	Denmark (DEN)	DNF
—	Claus Jørgensen	Denmark (DEN)	DNF
—	Sandis Sarna	Latvia (LAT)	DNF
—	András Gyöngyi	Hungary (HUN)	DNF
—	Sérgio Vieira	Portugal (POR)	DNF
—	Giovanni De Benedictis	Italy (ITA)	DNF
—	Michele Didoni	Italy (ITA)	DNF
—	Vitaliy Stetsyshyn	Ukraine (UKR)	DNF
—	Mariusz Ornoch	Poland (POL)	DNF

==== Team (Men) 20 km ====
Place	Country	Points
1st place, gold medalist(s)	Belarus	18 pts
2nd place, silver medalist(s)	Spain	24 pts
3rd place, bronze medalist(s)	Germany	55 pts
4	Russia	58 pts
5	France	70 pts
6	Portugal	72 pts
7	Latvia	80 pts
8	Poland	82 pts
9	Czech Republic	87 pts
10	Hungary	92 pts
11	Slovakia	106 pts
12	Ukraine	117 pts
13	Norway	124 pts
14	Lithuania	137 pts

=== Men's 50 km ===
Place	Athlete	Nation	Time
1st place, gold medalist(s)	Tomasz Lipiec	Poland (POL)	3:42:57
2nd place, silver medalist(s)	Jesús Ángel García	Spain (ESP)	3:43:17
3rd place, bronze medalist(s)	Giovanni Perricelli	Italy (ITA)	3:44:17
4	Aleksey Voyevodin	Russia (RUS)	3:46:31
5	Basilio Labrador	Spain (ESP)	3:47:28
6	René Piller	France (FRA)	3:47:41
7	Pavel Nikolayev	Russia (RUS)	3:47:51
8	Viktor Ginko	Belarus (BLR)	3:48:27
9	Valentin Kononen	Finland (FIN)	3:48:50
10	Štefan Malík	Slovakia (SVK)	3:49:40
11	Denis Trautmann	Germany (GER)	3:50:45
12	Stanisław Stosik	Poland (POL)	3:55:16
13	Aleksandar Raković	FR Yugoslavia (FR Yugoslavia)	3:55:39
14	Mario Avellaneda	Spain (ESP)	3:56:09
15	Antero Lindman	Finland (FIN)	3:57:03
16	Zoltán Czukor	Hungary (HUN)	3:57:44
17	Arturo Di Mezza	Italy (ITA)	3:58:11
18	Alessandro Mistretta	Italy (ITA)	3:59:08
19	Miloš Holuša	Czech Republic (CZE)	3:59:22
20	Peter Korčok	Slovakia (SVK)	4:01:19
21	Peter Zanner	Germany (GER)	4:01:23
22	Fredrik Svensson	Sweden (SWE)	4:01:52
23	Pedro Martins	Portugal (POR)	4:03:02
24	Vitaliy Gordey	Belarus (BLR)	4:03:06
25	Oleksiy Shelest	Ukraine (UKR)	4:03:06
26	Jacob Sørensen	Denmark (DEN)	4:03:51
27	José Magalhães	Portugal (POR)	4:03:52
28	Mark Easton	Great Britain (GBR)	4:03:53
29	Virgílio Soares	Portugal (POR)	4:03:54
30	David Boulanger	France (FRA)	4:06:18
31	Christophe Cousin	France (FRA)	4:07:26
32	Thomas Wallstab	Germany (GER)	4:08:29
33	Ulf-Peter Sjöholm	Sweden (SWE)	4:10:16
34	Erik Kalina	Slovakia (SVK)	4:10:47
35	Orazio Romanzi	Italy (ITA)	4:10:56
36	José Manuel Rodríguez	Spain (ESP)	4:11:56
37	Ervin Leczky	Hungary (HUN)	4:15:54
38	Jaroslav Makovec	Czech Republic (CZE)	4:17:46
39	Henk Plasman	Netherlands (NED)	4:18:11
40	Alexandr Andrushevskiy	Belarus (BLR)	4:19:31
41	Balázs Tóth	Hungary (HUN)	4:21:18
42	František Kmenta	Czech Republic (CZE)	4:25:42
43	Peter Ferrari	Sweden (SWE)	4:32:06
44	José Pinto	Portugal (POR)	4:34:02
45	Luc Nicque	Belgium (BEL)	4:35:33
46	Miloš Bušek	Czech Republic (CZE)	4:36:47
—	Dmitriy Savaytan	Belarus (BLR)	DQ
—	Marcel van Gemert	Netherlands (NED)	DQ
—	Kees Lambrechts	Netherlands (NED)	DQ
—	Gábor Lengyel	Hungary (HUN)	DQ
—	Oleg Ishutkin	Russia (RUS)	DQ
—	Vitaliy Popovich	Ukraine (UKR)	DQ
—	Roman Mrázek	Slovakia (SVK)	DQ
—	Frank Buytaert	Belgium (BEL)	DNF
—	Dirk Nicque	Belgium (BEL)	DNF
—	Klaus David Jensen	Denmark (DEN)	DNF
—	Peter Jensen	Denmark (DEN)	DNF
—	Jani Lehtinen	Finland (FIN)	DNF
—	Thierry Toutain	France (FRA)	DNF
—	Daugvinas Zujus	Lithuania (LTU)	DNF
—	Axel Noack	Germany (GER)	DNF
—	Waldemar Dudek	Poland (POL)	DNF
—	Jan Holender	Poland (POL)	DNF
—	Dmitriy Dolnikov	Russia (RUS)	DNF
—	Vladimir Soyka	Ukraine (UKR)	DNF
—	Igor Pasteruk	Ukraine (UKR)	DNF
—	Juha Kinnunen	Finland (FIN)	DNS

==== Team (Men) 50 km ====
Place	Country	Points
1st place, gold medalist(s)	Spain	21 pts
2nd place, silver medalist(s)	Italy	38 pts
3rd place, bronze medalist(s)	Slovakia	64 pts
4	Germany	64 pts
5	France	67 pts
6	Belarus	72 pts
7	Portugal	79 pts
8	Hungary	94 pts
9	Sweden	98 pts
10	Czech Republic	99 pts

==== Combined Team (Men) ====
Place	Country	Points
1st place, gold medalist(s)	Spain	45 pts
2nd place, silver medalist(s)	Belarus	90 pts
3rd place, bronze medalist(s)	Germany	119 pts
4	France	137 pts
5	Portugal	151 pts
6	Slovakia	170 pts
7	Hungary	186 pts
8	Czech Republic	186 pts

=== Women's 10 km ===
Place	Athlete	Nation	Time
1st place, gold medalist(s)	Nadezhda Ryashkina	Russia (RUS)	43:06
2nd place, silver medalist(s)	Mária Rosza-Urbanik	Hungary (HUN)	43:08
3rd place, bronze medalist(s)	Claudia Iovan	Romania (ROU)	43:12
4	Tamara Kovalenko	Russia (RUS)	43:14
5	Katarzyna Radtke	Poland (POL)	43:18
6	Tatyana Ragozina	Ukraine (UKR)	43:22
7	María Vasco	Spain (ESP)	43:23
8	Olga Kardopoltseva	Belarus (BLR)	43:26
9	Erica Alfridi	Italy (ITA)	43:30
10	Olga Panfyorova	Russia (RUS)	43:33
11	Encarna Granados	Spain (ESP)	43:34
12	Norica Cimpean	Romania (ROU)	43:46
13	Santa Compagnoni	Italy (ITA)	43:50
14	Elisabetta Perrone	Italy (ITA)	44:05
15	Kjersti Tysse Plätzer	Norway (NOR)	44:06
16	Natalya Misyulya	Belarus (BLR)	44:06
17	Valentina Tsybulskaya	Belarus (BLR)	44:15
18	Ildikó Ilyés	Hungary (HUN)	44:15
19	Larisa Khmelnitskaya	Belarus (BLR)	44:21
20	Yelena Arshintseva	Russia (RUS)	44:26
21	Svitlana Kalytka	Ukraine (UKR)	44:36
22	Anikó Szebenszky	Hungary (HUN)	44:41
23	Celia Marcén	Spain (ESP)	44:59
24	Teresa Linares	Spain (ESP)	45:01
25	Mónika Pesti	Hungary (HUN)	45:06
26	Fatiha Ouali	France (FRA)	45:52
27	Lisa Kehler	Great Britain (GBR)	45:53
28	Valérie Nadaud	France (FRA)	46:25
29	Beata Ornoch	Poland (POL)	46:25
30	Denise Friedenberger	Germany (GER)	46:29
31	Kristina Saltanovič	Lithuania (LTU)	46:38
32	Daniela Cirlan	Romania (ROU)	46:41
33	Hanne Liland	Norway (NOR)	46:46
34	Anne Catherine Berthonnaud	France (FRA)	46:48
35	Valentina Savchuk	Ukraine (UKR)	46:53
36	Zuzana Zemková	Slovakia (SVK)	47:07
37	Hristína Kokótou	Greece (GRE)	47:15
38	Sonata Milušauskaitė	Lithuania (LTU)	47:16
39	Annett Amberg	Germany (GER)	47:25
40	Gabriele Herold	Germany (GER)	47:42
41	Isilda Gonçalves	Portugal (POR)	47:56
42	Agnieszka Anduła	Poland (POL)	48:04
43	Elin Cecilie Løftesnes	Norway (NOR)	48:12
44	Bożena Górecka	Poland (POL)	48:15
45	Henrieta Ruznáková	Slovakia (SVK)	48:32
46	Zuzana Blažeková	Slovakia (SVK)	48:39
47	Ligia Gonçalves	Portugal (POR)	48:43
48	Nora Leksir	France (FRA)	48:47
49	Gražina Kiliūtė	Lithuania (LTU)	48:59
50	Jurgita Krinickaitė	Lithuania (LTU)	49:19
51	Inês Henriques	Portugal (POR)	49:21
52	Outi Sillanpää	Finland (FIN)	49:28
53	Mia Elina Risto	Finland (FIN)	50:14
54	Mária Gáliková	Slovakia (SVK)	50:51
55	Sofia Avoila	Portugal (POR)	50:58
56	Tarja Jaskari	Finland (FIN)	51:39
57	Yeliz Ay	Turkey (TUR)	52:12
58	Evita Erta	Latvia (LAT)	53:53
—	Iro Koukoula	Greece (GRE)	DQ
—	Annarita Sidoti	Italy (ITA)	DNF
—	Jonna Voronkoff	Finland (FIN)	DNF
—	Jolanta Dukure	Latvia (LAT)	DNF
—	Vira Zozulya	Ukraine (UKR)	DNF

==== Team (Women) ====
Place	Country	Points
1st place, gold medalist(s)	Russia	15 pts
2nd place, silver medalist(s)	Italy	36 pts
3rd place, bronze medalist(s)	Spain	41 pts
4	Belarus	41 pts
5	Hungary	42 pts
6	Romania	47 pts
7	Ukraine	62 pts
8	Poland	76 pts
9	France	88 pts
10	Norway	91 pts
11	Germany	109 pts
12	Lithuania	118 pts
13	Slovakia	127 pts
14	Portugal	139 pts
15	Finland	161 pts

== Participation ==
The participation of 208 athletes (145 men/63 women) from 28 countries is reported.

- Austria (4)
- Belarus (12)
- Belgium (3)
- Czech Republic (8)
- Denmark (6)
- Finland (7)
- France (12)
- Germany (11)
- Greece (4)
- Hungary (12)
- Italy (12)
- Latvia (6)
- Lithuania (9)
- Moldova (1)
- Netherlands (4)
- Norway (7)
- Poland (12)
- Portugal (12)
- Romania (5)
- Russia (12)
- Slovakia (12)
- Spain (12)
- Sweden (6)
- Switzerland (1)
- Turkey (2)
- Ukraine (12)
- United Kingdom (3)
- FR Yugoslavia (FR Yugoslavia) (1)
