= 1999 IAAF World Race Walking Cup =

- Organisers: IAAF
- Edition: 19th
- Date: May 1–2
- Host city: Mézidon-Canon, Basse-Normandie, France
- Events: 3
- Participation: 372 athletes from 57 nations

The 1999 IAAF World Race Walking Cup was held on 1 and 2 May 1999 in the streets of Mézidon-Canon, France. From this year on, there was no combined men's team trophy (Lugano Trophy), just the separate standings for the two races, and the women's team trophy was no longer called "Eschborn Cup" as before with their distance being increased from 10 km to 20 km.

Detailed reports on the event and an appraisal of the results was given for the IAAF.

Complete results were published.

== Medallists ==
Event	Gold		Silver		Bronze	
Men
Men's 20 km walk	Bernardo Segura; Mexico	1:20:20	Yu Guohui; China	1:20:21	Vladimir Andreyev; Russia	1:20:29
Men's 50 km walk	Sergey Korepanov; Kazakhstan	3:39:22	Tomasz Lipiec; Poland	3:40:08	Nikolay Matyukhin; Russia	3:40:13
Team (Men)
Team (Men 20 km)	Russia	19 pts	Mexico	28 pts	China	29 pts
Team (Men 50 km)	Russia	14 pts	Spain	26 pts	Germany	55 pts
Women
Women's 20 km walk	Hongyu Liu; China	1:27:32	Natalya Fedoskina; Russia	1:27:35	Norica Câmpean; Romania	1:27:48
Team (Women)
Team (Women 20 km)	China	13 pts	Russia	16 pts	Mexico	54 pts

== Results ==
=== Men's 20 km ===
Place	Athlete	Nation	Time	Notes
1st place, gold medalist(s)	Bernardo Segura	Mexico (MEX)	1:20:20	
2nd place, silver medalist(s)	Yu Guohui	China (CHN)	1:20:21	
3rd place, bronze medalist(s)	Vladimir Andreyev	Russia (RUS)	1:20:29	
4	Robert Korzeniowski	Poland (POL)	1:20:52	
5	Daniel García	Mexico (MEX)	1:21:31	
6	Mikhail Khmelnitskiy	Belarus (BLR)	1:21:32	
7	Ilya Markov	Russia (RUS)	1:21:42	
8	Alessandro Gandellini	Italy (ITA)	1:21:49	
9	Dmitriy Yesipchuk	Russia (RUS)	1:21:54	
10	Arturo Huerta	Canada (CAN)	1:22:26	
11	Liu Yunfeng	China (CHN)	1:22:41	
12	Paquillo Fernández	Spain (ESP)	1:22:47	
13	Ivan Trotski	Belarus (BLR)	1:22:59	
14	Yevgeniy Misyulya	Belarus (BLR)	1:23:19	
15	Hatem Ghoula	Tunisia (TUN)	1:23:46	
16	Yu Chaohong	China (CHN)	1:23:46	
17	David Márquez	Spain (ESP)	1:24:01	
18	Li Zewen	China (CHN)	1:24:03	
19	Sándor Urbanik	Hungary (HUN)	1:24:13	
20	Francesco Galdenzi	Italy (ITA)	1:24:16	
21	João Vieira	Portugal (POR)	1:24:25	
22	Alejandro López	Mexico (MEX)	1:24:31	
23	Costică Bălan	Romania (ROU)	1:24:56	
24	Mario Flores	Mexico (MEX)	1:25:49	
25	Valeriy Borisov	Kazakhstan (KAZ)	1:25:51	
26	André Höhne	Germany (GER)	1:25:51	
27	Birger Fält	Sweden (SWE)	1:25:56	
28	Róbert Valíček	Slovakia (SVK)	1:26:00	
29	Aleksey Kronin	Russia (RUS)	1:26:09	
30	José Urbano	Portugal (POR)	1:26:14	
31	Augusto Cardoso	Portugal (POR)	1:26:22	
32	Mariusz Ornoch	Poland (POL)	1:26:51	
33	Juan Manuel Molina	Spain (ESP)	1:27:00	
34	Theódoros Stamatópoulos	Greece (GRE)	1:27:00	
35	Tim Seaman	United States (USA)	1:27:20	
36	Viktoras Meškauskas	Lithuania (LTU)	1:27:22	
37	Qi Jun	China (CHN)	1:27:23	
38	Gintaras Andriuškevičius	Lithuania (LTU)	1:27:31	
39	Vittorino Mucci	Italy (ITA)	1:27:33	
40	Grzegorz Sudoł	Poland (POL)	1:27:54	
41	Sérgio Vieira	Portugal (POR)	1:28:08	
42	Daisuke Ikeshima	Japan (JPN)	1:28:10	
43	Daugvinas Zujus	Lithuania (LTU)	1:28:46	
44	Fernando Vázquez	Spain (ESP)	1:28:48	
45	Artur Meleshkevich	Belarus (BLR)	1:28:57	
46	Silviu Casandra	Romania (ROU)	1:28:59	
47	Tim Berrett	Canada (CAN)	1:29:01	
48	Thierry Toutain	France (FRA)	1:29:10	
49	Spyridon Kastánis	Greece (GRE)	1:29:19	
50	Darren Bown	Australia (AUS)	1:29:31	
51	Rogelio Sánchez	Mexico (MEX)	1:29:35	
52	Hubert Sonnek	Czech Republic (CZE)	1:29:38	
53	Kazimir Verkin	Slovakia (SVK)	1:29:45	
54	Nixon Zambrano	Colombia (COL)	1:29:59	
55	Luke Adams	Australia (AUS)	1:30:11	
56	Grzegorz Müller	Poland (POL)	1:30:18	
57	Pierce OʼCallaghan	Ireland (IRL)	1:30:19	
58	Eddy Riva	France (FRA)	1:30:25	
59	Troy Sundstrom	Australia (AUS)	1:30:28	
60	Mike Trautmann	Germany (GER)	1:30:29	
61	Sten Reichel	Germany (GER)	1:30:33	
62	Marek Janek	Slovakia (SVK)	1:30:35	
63	Jonathan Matthews	United States (USA)	1:30:38	
64	Thapelo Mangole	South Africa (RSA)	1:31:00	
65	Jacek Müller	Poland (POL)	1:31:02	
66	Bengt Bengtsson	Sweden (SWE)	1:31:04	
67	Antony Gillet	France (FRA)	1:31:06	
68	Rishat Shafikov	Russia (RUS)	1:31:09	
69	Luis García	Guatemala (GUA)	1:31:19	
70	Robert Heffernan	Ireland (IRL)	1:32:14	
71	Kevin Eastler	United States (USA)	1:32:41	
72	Narinder Harbans Singh	Malaysia (MAS)	1:33:01	
73	Jiří Malysa	Czech Republic (CZE)	1:33:11	
74	Jamie OʼRawe	Great Britain (GBR)	1:33:16	
75	Jan Staaf	Sweden (SWE)	1:33:17	
76	Denny Galanello	Italy (ITA)	1:33:24	
77	Chris Maddocks	Great Britain (GBR)	1:33:25	
78	Satoshi Yanagisawa	Japan (JPN)	1:33:43	
79	Chris Britz	South Africa (RSA)	1:34:01	
80	Miloš Bátovský	Slovakia (SVK)	1:34:28	
81	Al Heppner	United States (USA)	1:34:35	
82	Karl Atton	Great Britain (GBR)	1:34:36	
83	Andi Drake	Great Britain (GBR)	1:34:53	
84	Gábor Lengyel	Hungary (HUN)	1:35:40	
85	Teoh Boon Lim	Malaysia (MAS)	1:35:45	
86	Harold van Beek	Netherlands (NED)	1:36:05	
87	Franck Delree	France (FRA)	1:36:31	
88	Bogdan Mazilu	Romania (ROU)	1:36:37	
89	Hugo Aros	Chile (CHI)	1:36:45	
90	Balay Thirukumaran	Malaysia (MAS)	1:37:12	
91	Riecus Blignaut	South Africa (RSA)	1:37:35	
92	Rami Al-Deeb	Palestine (PLE)	1:37:46	
93	Jean-Marc Starck	France (FRA)	1:37:47	
94	Abdulkader Öz	Turkey (TUR)	1:37:48	
95	Jamie Costin	Ireland (IRL)	1:37:54	
96	Mohd Shahrul Haizy	Malaysia (MAS)	1:38:51	
97	David Šnajdr	Czech Republic (CZE)	1:39:01	
98	Nicolás Soto	Puerto Rico (PUR)	1:39:38	
99	Eliu Barrera	Chile (CHI)	1:39:47	
100	Jérôme Genet	Switzerland (SUI)	1:40:14	
101	Matt Hales	Great Britain (GBR)	1:40:23	
102	Karsten Godtfredsen	Denmark (DEN)	1:40:41	
103	Jean-Sebastien Beaucage	Canada (CAN)	1:43:45	
104	András Gyöngyi	Hungary (HUN)	1:44:00	
105	Gergely Zaborszky	Hungary (HUN)	1:44:03	
106	Torben Bogø Kristiansen	Denmark (DEN)	1:44:27	
107	Jesper Møller-Thomsen	Denmark (DEN)	1:44:45	
108	Alfredo Cabrera	Puerto Rico (PUR)	1:45:15	
109	Pavel Svoboda	Czech Republic (CZE)	1:46:03	
110	Michael Rohl	United States (USA)	1:47:36	
111	Nicolas Perrier	Switzerland (SUI)	1:48:39	
112	José Ramírez	Puerto Rico (PUR)	1:48:57	
113	Vincent Asumang	Ghana (GHA)	1:49:38	
114	Sebahattin Tatar	Turkey (TUR)	1:50:31	
116	Jacques Lubbe	South Africa (RSA)	1:52:16	
117	Christian Lombardin	Madagascar (MAD)	1:54:50	
118	Carlos Romero	Chile (CHI)	1:55:24	
119	Pradeep Chand	Fiji (FIJ)	1:58:47	
120	Selwyn Shaniel Singh	Fiji (FIJ)	2:08:50	
—	Nathan Deakes	Australia (AUS)	DQ	
—	Daniel Plaza	Spain (ESP)	DQ	
—	Julio Rene Martínez	Guatemala (GUA)	DQ	
—	Enrico Lang	Italy (ITA)	DQ	
—	Nick AʼHern	Australia (AUS)	DNF	
—	Andrey Makarov	Belarus (BLR)	DNF	
—	Sergio Galdino	Brazil (BRA)	DNF	
—	Claus Jørgensen	Denmark (DEN)	DNF	
—	Moawad Zaki El-Sayed	Egypt (EGY)	DNF	
—	Andreas Erm	Germany (GER)	DNF	
—	Alex Agyakwa	Ghana (GHA)	DNF	
—	Denis Estrada	Guatemala (GUA)	DNF	
—	Sudhir Nandyal	India (IND)	DNF	
—	Sita Ram	India (IND)	DNF	
—	Amrik Singh	India (IND)	DNF	
—	Yann Banderet	Switzerland (SUI)	DNF	
—	Daniele Carrobio	Switzerland (SUI)	DNF	
—	Miroslav Bosko	Slovakia (SVK)	DNF	
—	Ahmet Cakan	Turkey (TUR)	DNF	
—	Daniel Foudjem Ganno	Cameroon (CMR)	DNS	
—	Sydney Pioh	Congo (CGO)	DNS	
—	Saidu Bangura	Sierra Leone (SLE)	DNS	
—	Foday Kamara	Sierra Leone (SLE)	DNS	
—	Ahmed Seary Wurie	Sierra Leone (SLE)	DNS	
—	Kabineh Toure	Sierra Leone (SLE)	DNS	

==== Team (20 km Men) ====
Place	Country	Points
1st place, gold medalist(s)	Russia	19 pts
2nd place, silver medalist(s)	Mexico	28 pts
3rd place, bronze medalist(s)	China	29 pts
4	Belarus	33 pts
5	Spain	62 pts
6	Italy	67 pts
7	Poland	76 pts
8	Portugal	82 pts
9	Lithuania	117 pts
10	Slovakia	143 pts
11	Germany	147 pts
12	Romania	157 pts
13	Canada	160 pts
14	Australia	164 pts
15	Sweden	168 pts
16	United States	169 pts
17	France	173 pts
18	Hungary	207 pts
19	Ireland	222 pts
20	Czech Republic	222 pts
21	United Kingdom	233 pts
22	South Africa	234 pts
23	Malaysia	247 pts
24	Chile	306 pts
25	Denmark	315 pts
26	Puerto Rico	318 pts
27	Fiji	354 pts

=== Men's 50 km ===
Place	Athlete	Nation	Time	Notes
1st place, gold medalist(s)	Sergey Korepanov	Kazakhstan (KAZ)	3:39:22	
2nd place, silver medalist(s)	Tomasz Lipiec	Poland (POL)	3:40:08	
3rd place, bronze medalist(s)	Nikolay Matyukhin	Russia (RUS)	3:40:13	
4	Jesús Ángel García	Spain (ESP)	3:40:40	
5	German Skurygin	Russia (RUS)	3:40:54	
6	Yevgeniy Shmalyuk	Russia (RUS)	3:41:56	
7	Viktor Ginko	Belarus (BLR)	3:43:15	
8	Valentí Massana	Spain (ESP)	3:45:29	
9	Aigars Fadejevs	Latvia (LAT)	3:46:36	
10	Aleksandar Raković	Yugoslavia (YUG)	3:48:01	
11	Curt Clausen	United States (USA)	3:48:04	
12	Denis Trautmann	Germany (GER)	3:48:05	
13	Craig Barrett	New Zealand (NZL)	3:48:14	
14	Santiago Pérez	Spain (ESP)	3:48:27	
15	Modris Liepiņš	Latvia (LAT)	3:48:30	
16	Basilio Labrador	Spain (ESP)	3:48:55	
17	Denis Langlois	France (FRA)	3:48:56	
18	Robert Ihly	Germany (GER)	3:49:22	
19	Miguel Rodríguez	Mexico (MEX)	3:49:53	
20	René Piller	France (FRA)	3:50:08	
21	Sylvain Caudron	France (FRA)	3:50:16	
22	Carlos Mercenario	Mexico (MEX)	3:50:55	
23	Mikel Odriozola	Spain (ESP)	3:51:01	
24	Roman Magdziarczyk	Poland (POL)	3:51:20	
25	Denis Franke	Germany (GER)	3:51:27	
26	Ivano Brugnetti	Italy (ITA)	3:51:45	
27	Peter Tichý	Slovakia (SVK)	3:52:09	
28	Joel Sánchez	Mexico (MEX)	3:52:31	
29	Pascal Servanty	France (FRA)	3:52:51	
30	Aleksey Voyevodin	Russia (RUS)	3:53:11	
31	Miloš Holuša	Czech Republic (CZE)	3:53:48	
32	Ma Hongye	China (CHN)	3:53:49	
33	Stanisław Stosik	Poland (POL)	3:53:55	
34	Giovanni Perricelli	Italy (ITA)	3:54:33	
35	Jan Holender	Poland (POL)	3:54:36	
36	Alessandro Mistretta	Italy (ITA)	3:54:39	
37	Zoltán Czukor	Hungary (HUN)	3:54:48	
38	Antero Lindman	Finland (FIN)	3:55:07	
39	Trond Nymark	Norway (NOR)	3:55:31	
40	Igor Kollár	Slovakia (SVK)	3:55:43	
41	Pedro Martins	Portugal (POR)	3:56:25	
42	Takehito Hirakawa	Japan (JPN)	3:58:01	
43	Akihiko Koike	Japan (JPN)	3:59:17	
44	David Boulanger	France (FRA)	3:59:35	
45	Philip Dunn	United States (USA)	3:59:53	
46	Dominic McGrath	Australia (AUS)	4:00:50	
47	José Magalhães	Portugal (POR)	4:00:52	
48	Peter Korčok	Slovakia (SVK)	4:01:00	
49	Gyula Dudás	Hungary (HUN)	4:01:18	
50	František Kmenta	Czech Republic (CZE)	4:01:19	
51	Duane Cousins	Australia (AUS)	4:02:27	
52	Benjamin Leroy	Belgium (BEL)	4:03:49	
53	Fredrik Svensson	Sweden (SWE)	4:04:48	
54	Héctor Moreno	Colombia (COL)	4:05:31	
55	Virgilho Soares	Portugal (POR)	4:06:17	
56	Jacob Sørensen	Denmark (DEN)	4:06:50	
57	Chris Cheeseman	Great Britain (GBR)	4:07:49	
58	Michele Didoni	Italy (ITA)	4:08:20	
59	Erik Kalina	Slovakia (SVK)	4:08:34	
60	Andrew Hermann	United States (USA)	4:08:47	
61	Michael Harvey	Australia (AUS)	4:08:58	
62	Liu Xiaochun	China (CHN)	4:09:34	
63	Zhang Huiqiang	China (CHN)	4:09:36	
64	Klaus Jensen	Denmark (DEN)	4:11:47	
65	Jaime González	Mexico (MEX)	4:11:48	
66	Luís Ribeiro	Portugal (POR)	4:12:32	
67	Gary Morgan	United States (USA)	4:13:13	
68	Sabir Sharuyayev	Kazakhstan (KAZ)	4:15:01	
69	Les Morton	Great Britain (GBR)	4:15:43	
70	Jorge Costa	Portugal (POR)	4:15:59	
71	Rustam Kuvatov	Kazakhstan (KAZ)	4:16:29	
72	Marcel van Gemert	Netherlands (NED)	4:16:40	
73	Shane Pearson	Australia (AUS)	4:16:43	
74	Steven Hollier	Great Britain (GBR)	4:20:35	
75	Ulf-Peter Sjöholm	Sweden (SWE)	4:22:12	
76	Pedro Huntjens	Netherlands (NED)	4:23:53	
77	Heikki Kinnunen	Finland (FIN)	4:24:31	
78	Christer Svensson	Sweden (SWE)	4:26:46	
79	Andrzej Chylinski	United States (USA)	4:27:52	
81	Attila Vozár	Hungary (HUN)	4:37:47	
82	Kees Lambrechts	Netherlands (NED)	4:43:58	
83	Karoly Kirszt	Hungary (HUN)	4:48:38	
84	Sebastien Genin	Switzerland (SUI)	4:50:03	
85	Hans Christensen	Denmark (DEN)	4:53:10	
86	Bernard Cossy	Switzerland (SUI)	4:58:32	
87	Olivier Bianchi-Pastori	Switzerland (SUI)	5:02:53	
—	Jaroslav Makovec	Czech Republic (CZE)	DQ	
—	Jani Lehtinen	Finland (FIN)	DQ	
—	Allan King	Great Britain (GBR)	DQ	
—	Axel Noack	Germany (GER)	DQ	
—	Thomas Wallstab	Germany (GER)	DQ	
—	Nguyen Dïnh Cang	Vietnam (VIE)	DQ	
—	Dion Russell	Australia (AUS)	DNF	
—	Wang Shengtang	China (CHN)	DNF	
—	Yang Yongyian	China (CHN)	DNF	
—	Jefferson Pérez	Ecuador (ECU)	DNF	
—	Valentin Kononen	Finland (FIN)	DNF	
—	Mark Easton	Great Britain (GBR)	DNF	
—	Nishi Kanta	India (IND)	DNF	
—	Arturo Di Mezza	Italy (ITA)	DNF	
—	Hiromu Sakai	Japan (JPN)	DNF	
—	Fedosey Chumachenko	Moldova (MDA)	DNF	
—	Ignacio Zamudio	Mexico (MEX)	DNF	
—	Andrey Plotnikov	Russia (RUS)	DNF	
—	Pascal Charrière	Switzerland (SUI)	DNF	
—	Štefan Malík	Slovakia (SVK)	DNF	
—	Peter Ferrari	Sweden (SWE)	DNF	

==== Team (50 km Men) ====
Place	Country	Points
1st place, gold medalist(s)	Russia	14 pts
2nd place, silver medalist(s)	Spain	26 pts
3rd place, bronze medalist(s)	Germany	55 pts
4	France	58 pts
5	Poland	59 pts
6	Mexico	69 pts
7	Italy	96 pts
8	Latvia	104 pts
9	Slovakia	115 pts
10	United States	116 pts
11	Kazakhstan	140 pts
12	Portugal	143 pts
13	China	157 pts
14	Australia	158 pts
15	Hungary	167 pts
16	United Kingdom	200 pts
17	Denmark	205 pts
18	Sweden	206 pts
19	Netherlands	230 pts
20	Switzerland	257 pts

=== Women's 20 km ===
Place	Athlete	Nation	Time	Notes
1st place, gold medalist(s)	Hongyu Liu	China (CHN)	1:27:32	
2nd place, silver medalist(s)	Natalya Fedoskina	Russia (RUS)	1:27:35	
3rd place, bronze medalist(s)	Norica Câmpean	Romania (ROM)	1:27:48	
4	Yelena Nikolayeva	Russia (RUS)	1:28:23	
5	Wang Yan	China (CHN)	1:29:15	
6	Claudia Iovan	Romania (ROM)	1:29:39	
7	Gao Hongmiao	China (CHN)	1:30:03	
8	Graciela Mendoza	Mexico (MEX)	1:30:03	
9	Susana Feitor	Portugal (POR)	1:30:13	
10	Tamara Kovalenko	Russia (RUS)	1:30:20	
11	Li Hong	China (CHN)	1:30:35	
12	Rosario Sánchez	Mexico (MEX)	1:30:52	
13	Pan Hailian	China (CHN)	1:31:17	
14	Katarzyna Radtke	Poland (POL)	1:31:26	
15	Lyudmila Dolgopolova	Belarus (BLR)	1:31:43	
16	Kjersti Plätzer	Norway (NOR)	1:31:45	
17	Svetlana Tolstaya	Kazakhstan (KAZ)	1:31:46	
18	Jane Saville	Australia (AUS)	1:31:58	
19	Celia Marcén	Spain (ESP)	1:32:14	
20	Elisabetta Perrone	Italy (ITA)	1:32:21	
21	Kerry Saxby-Junna	Australia (AUS)	1:32:24	
22	Maya Sazonova	Kazakhstan (KAZ)	1:32:29	
23	María Vasco	Spain (ESP)	1:32:38	
24	Olga Kardopoltseva	Belarus (BLR)	1:32:53	
25	Valentina Tsybulskaya	Belarus (BLR)	1:33:14	
26	Mária Rosza-Urbanik	Hungary (HUN)	1:33:28	
27	Larisa Khmelnitskaya	Belarus (BLR)	1:33:55	
28	Kristina Saltanovič	Lithuania (LTU)	1:34:03	
29	Yuan Yufang	Malaysia (MAS)	1:34:13	
30	Tatyana Ragozina	Ukraine (UKR)	1:34:29	
31	Santa Compagnoni	Italy (ITA)	1:34:52	
32	Svitlana Kalitka	Ukraine (UKR)	1:35:23	
33	Anikó Szebenszky	Hungary (HUN)	1:35:26	
34	María Guadalupe Sánchez	Mexico (MEX)	1:35:33	
35	Victoria Palacios	Mexico (MEX)	1:35:36	
36	Kathrin Born-Boyde	Germany (GER)	1:35:58	
37	Gisella Orsini	Italy (ITA)	1:35:58	
38	Teresa Linares	Spain (ESP)	1:36:18	
39	Susan Vermeulen	South Africa (RSA)	1:36:18	
40	Lisa Sheridan-Paolini	Australia (AUS)	1:36:20	
41	Geovana Irusta	Bolivia (BOL)	1:36:29	
42	Melanie Seeger	Germany (GER)	1:36:33	
43	Yuka Mitsumori	Japan (JPN)	1:36:38	
44	Teresita Collado	Guatemala (GUA)	1:36:43	
45	Rossella Giordano	Italy (ITA)	1:36:49	
46	Michelle Rohl	United States (USA)	1:36:50	
47	Sonata Milušauskaitė	Lithuania (LTU)	1:37:01	
48	Mónika Pesti	Hungary (HUN)	1:37:21	
49	Rocío Florido	Spain (ESP)	1:37:25	
50	Miriam Ramón	Ecuador (ECU)	1:37:27	
51	Nora Leksir	France (FRA)	1:37:36	
52	Anne Haaland Simonsen	Norway (NOR)	1:37:44	
53	Joanne Dow	United States (USA)	1:38:08	
54	Annett Amberg	Germany (GER)	1:38:27	
55	Janice McCaffrey	Canada (CAN)	1:38:34	
56	Hristína Kokótou	Greece (GRE)	1:38:42	
57	Ana Maria Groza	Romania (ROU)	1:39:05	
58	Danielle Kirk	United States (USA)	1:39:10	
59	Simone Wolowiec	Australia (AUS)	1:39:31	
60	Ildikó Ilyés	Hungary (HUN)	1:39:39	
61	Anne-Catherine Berthonnaud	France (FRA)	1:39:59	
62	Sofia Avoila	Portugal (POR)	1:40:13	
63	Ivis Martínez	El Salvador (ESA)	1:40:22	
64	Jill Zenner-Cobb	United States (USA)	1:40:30	
66	Isilda Gonçalves	Portugal (POR)	1:40:42	
67	Tatiana Denize	France (FRA)	1:40:48	
68	Nadiya Sukharina	Ukraine (UKR)	1:41:27	
69	Outi Sillanpää	Finland (FIN)	1:41:30	
70	Jolanta Dukure	Latvia (LAT)	1:41:55	
71	Monica Svensson	Sweden (SWE)	1:42:08	
72	Gillian OʼSullivan	Ireland (IRL)	1:42:20	
73	Gianetti Bonfim	Brazil (BRA)	1:42:26	
74	Vicky Lupton	Great Britain (GBR)	1:42:31	
75	Aura Morales	Mexico (MEX)	1:43:56	
76	Catherine Charnock	Great Britain (GBR)	1:43:57	
77	Niobe Menéndez	Great Britain (GBR)	1:44:17	
78	Bożena Górecka	Poland (POL)	1:44:26	
79	Olga Polyakova	Russia (RUS)	1:45:13	
80	Fatiha Ouali	France (FRA)	1:45:22	
81	Yelena Kuznetsova	Kazakhstan (KAZ)	1:45:41	
82	Elin Cecilie Loftesnes	Norway (NOR)	1:45:59	
83	Deirdre Gallagher	Ireland (IRL)	1:46:11	
84	Joni Bender	Canada (CAN)	1:46:12	
85	Bertha Vera	Ecuador (ECU)	1:46:13	
86	Ryoko Sakakura	Japan (JPN)	1:46:17	
87	Wendy Muldoon	Australia (AUS)	1:46:25	
88	Margaret Ditchburn	United States (USA)	1:46:26	
89	Holly Gerke	Canada (CAN)	1:46:34	
90	Kim Braznell	Great Britain (GBR)	1:47:22	
91	Olive Loughnane	Ireland (IRL)	1:48:04	
92	Magdalena Jacobsson	Sweden (SWE)	1:49:25	
93	Yeliz Ay	Turkey (TUR)	1:50:17	
94	Alexándra Tziouti	Greece (GRE)	1:50:19	
95	Linda Tenggren	Sweden (SWE)	1:50:53	
96	Tarja Jaskari	Finland (FIN)	1:51:01	
97	Roseline Chapillon	France (FRA)	1:51:45	
98	Zoila Reyes	Guatemala (GUA)	1:51:57	
99	Nagwa Ibrahim	Egypt (EGY)	1:52:46	
100	Elina Risto	Finland (FIN)	1:53:57	
101	Marina Crivello	Canada (CAN)	1:54:15	
102	Karina Szuromi	Hungary (HUN)	1:55:01	
103	Christine Celant	Switzerland (SUI)	1:55:19	
104	Marie Polli	Switzerland (SUI)	1:56:35	
105	Isabelle Clermont	Canada (CAN)	1:56:37	
106	Heidi Maeder	Switzerland (SUI)	1:57:36	
107	Anne-Hortense Ebéna	Cameroon (CMR)	1:58:37	
108	Letchmee Vellien	Mauritius (MRI)	2:02:27	
109	Marie Yolene Raffin	Mauritius (MRI)	2:05:11	
110	Marjorie Bill	Mauritius (MRI)	2:14:42	
—	Anne Judkins	New Zealand (NZL)	DQ	
—	Natalya Misyulya	Belarus (BLR)	DNF	
—	Eva Pérez	Spain (ESP)	DNF	
—	Lisa Crump	Great Britain (GBR)	DNF	
—	Beate Anders-Gummelt	Germany (GER)	DNF	
—	Hristína Deskou	Greece (GRE)	DNF	
—	Erica Alfridi	Italy (ITA)	DNF	
—	Nadeshka Negrón	Puerto Rico (PUR)	DNF	
—	Nadezhda Ryashkina	Russia (RUS)	DNF	
—	Valentina Savchuk	Ukraine (UKR)	DNF	
—	Nguyen Thi Thu Cúc	Vietnam (VIE)	DNF	
—	Gertrude Chila	Zambia (ZAM)	DNF	
—	Salome Kamanga	Zambia (ZAM)	DNF	

==== Team (20km Women) ====
Place	Country	Points
1st place, gold medalist(s)	China	13 pts
2nd place, silver medalist(s)	Russia	16 pts
3rd place, bronze medalist(s)	Mexico	54 pts
4	Belarus	64 pts
5	Romania	66 pts
6	Australia	79 pts
7	Spain	80 pts
8	Italy	88 pts
9	Hungary	107 pts
10	Kazakhstan	120 pts
11	Ukraine	130 pts
12	Germany	132 pts
13	Portugal	137 pts
14	Lithuania	140 pts
15	Norway	150 pts
16	United States	157 pts
17	France	179 pts
18	United Kingdom	227 pts
19	Canada	228 pts
20	Ireland	246 pts
21	Sweden	258 pts
22	Finland	265 pts
23	Switzerland	313 pts
24	Mauritius	327 pts

== Participation ==
The participation of 372 athletes (249 men/123 women) from 57 countries is reported.

- Australia (10/5)
- Belarus (6/5)
- Belgium (1/-)
- Bolivia (-/1)
- Brazil (1/1)
- Cameroon (1^{*}/1)
- Canada (3/5)
- Chile (3/-)
- China (10/5)
- Colombia (2/-)
- Republic of the Congo (1^{*}/-)
- Czech Republic (7/-)
- Denmark (7/-)
- Ecuador (1/2)
- Egypt (1/1)
- El Salvador (-/1)
- Fiji (2/-)
- Finland (4/3)
- France (10/5)
- Germany (9/4)
- Ghana (2/-)
- Greece (2/3)
- Guatemala (3/2)
- Hungary (8/5)
- India (4/-)
- Ireland (3/3)
- Italy (10/5)
- Japan (5/2)
- Kazakhstan (4/3)
- Latvia (2/1)
- Lithuania (3/2)
- Madagascar (1/-)
- Malaysia (4/1)
- Mauritius (-/3)
- Mexico (10/5)
- Moldova (1/-)
- Netherlands (4/-)
- New Zealand (1/1)
- Norway (1/3)
- Palestine (1/-)
- Poland (9/2)
- Portugal (9/3)
- Puerto Rico (3/1)
- Romania (3/3)
- Russia (10/5)
- Sierra Leone (4^{*}/-)
- Slovakia (10/-)
- South Africa (4/1)
- Spain (10/5)
- Sweden (7/3)
- Switzerland (8/3)
- Tunisia (1/-)
- Turkey (3/1)
- Ukraine (-/4)
- United Kingdom (10/5)
- United States (10/5)
- Vietnam (1/1)
- (Federal Republic of Yugoslavia) Yugoslavia (1/-)
- Zambia (-/2)

^{*}: Athletes announced in the official start list, but did not show.

== See also ==
- 1999 Race Walking Year Ranking
