= 2000 in race walking =

This page lists the World Best Year Performance in the year 2000 in both the men's and the women's race walking distances: 20 km and 50 km (outdoor). The main events during this season took place at the Olympic Games in Sydney, Australia.

== Abbreviations ==
- All times shown are in hours:minutes:seconds

WR	world record
AR	area record
CR	event record
NR	national record
PB	personal best

== Men's 20 km ==
=== Records ===
Standing records prior to the 2000 season in track and field
World Record	Julio René Martínez (GUA)	1:17:46	May 8, 1999	Eisenhüttenstadt, Germany
Equalled records during the 2000 season in track and field
World Record	Roman Rasskazov (RUS)	1:17:46	May 19, 2000	Moscow, Russia

=== 2000 World Year Ranking ===
Rank	Time	Athlete	Venue	Date	Note
1	1:17:46	Roman Rasskazov (RUS)	Moscow, Russia	19 05 2000	WR
2	1:18:14	Mikhail Khmelnitskiy (BLR)	Soligorsk, Belarus	13 05 2000	
3	1:18:16	Vladimir Andreyev (RUS)	Moscow, Russia	19 05 2000	
4	1:18:22	Robert Korzeniowski (POL)	Hildesheim, Germany	09 07 2000	
5	1:18:23	Andrey Makarov (BLR)	Soligorsk, Belarus	13 05 2000	
6	1:18:42	Andreas Erm (GER)	Eisenhüttenstadt, Germany	17 06 2000	
7	1:18:56	Paquillo Fernández (ESP)	Eisenhüttenstadt, Germany	17 06 2000	
8	1:19:03	Noé Hernández (MEX)	Sydney, Australia	22 09 2000	
9	1:19:15	Artur Meleshkevich (BLR)	Soligorsk, Belarus	13 05 2000	
10	1:19:18	Jiří Malysa (CZE)	Eisenhüttenstadt, Germany	17 06 2000	

== Men's 50 km ==
=== Records ===
Standing records prior to the 2000 season in track and field
World Record	Andrey Perlov (URS)	3:37:41	August 5, 1989	Leningrad, Soviet Union
Broken records during the 2000 season in track and field
World Record	Valeriy Spitsyn (RUS)	3:37:26	May 21, 2000	Moscow, Russia

=== 2000 World Year Ranking ===
Rank	Time	Athlete	Venue	Date	Note
1	3:36:39	Valeriy Spitsyn (RUS)	Moscow, Russia	21 05 2000	WR
2	3:39:21	Vladimir Potemin (RUS)	Moscow, Russia	21 05 2000	
3	3:39:34	Valentin Kononen (FIN)	Dudince, Slovakia	25 03 2000	
4	3:41:50	Robert Korzeniowski (POL)	Ponte de Sôr, Portugal	05 03 2000	
5	3:42:02	Nikolay Matyukhin (RUS)	Moscow, Russia	21 05 2000	
6	3:42:51	Jesús Ángel García (ESP)	Eisenhüttenstadt, Germany	18 06 2000	
7	3:43:40	Aigars Fadejevs (LAT)	Sydney, Australia	29 09 2000	
8	3:43:52	Miguel Rodríguez (MEX)	Poza Rica, Mexico	09 04 2000	
9	3:44:30	Andrey Plotnikov (RUS)	Moscow, Russia	21 05 2000	
10	3:44:33	Yevgeniy Shmalyuk (RUS)	Eisenhüttenstadt, Germany	18 06 2000	

== Women's 20 km ==
=== Records ===
Standing records prior to the 2000 season in track and field
World Record	Liu Hongyu (CHN)	1:27:30	May 1, 1995	Beijing, PR China
World Record	Nadezhda Ryashkina (RUS)	1:27:30	February 2, 1999	Adler, Russia
Broken records during the 2000 season in track and field
World Record	Tatyana Gudkova (RUS)	1:25:18	May 19, 2000	Moscow, Russia

=== 2000 World Year Ranking ===
Rank	Time	Athlete	Venue	Date	Note
1	1:25:18	Tatyana Gudkova (RUS)	Moscow, Russia	19 05 2000	WR
2	1:25:20	Olga Polyakova (RUS)	Moscow, Russia	19 05 2000	
3	1:25:29	Irina Stankina (RUS)	Moscow, Russia	19 05 2000	
4	1:25:59	Tamara Kovalenko (RUS)	Moscow, Russia	19 05 2000	
5	1:26:08	Olimpiada Ivanova (RUS)	Moscow, Russia	19 05 2000	
6	1:27:42	Elisabetta Perrone (ITA)	Eisenhüttenstadt, Germany	17 06 2000	
7	1:27:53	Kjersti Plätzer (NOR)	Eisenhüttenstadt, Germany	17 06 2000	
8	1:27:55	Liu Hongyu (CHN)	Rio Maior, Portugal	15 04 2000	
9	1:28:06	Nadezhda Ryashkina (RUS)	Moscow, Russia	19 05 2000	
10	1:28:06	Erica Alfridi (ITA)	Eisenhüttenstadt, Germany	17 06 2000	
11	1:28:19	Susana Feitor (POR)	Hildesheim, Germany	09 07 2000	
12	1:28:24	Natalya Misyulya (BLR)	Soligorsk, Belarus	13 05 2000	
13	1:28:27	Wang Yan (CHN)	Rio Maior, Portugal	15 04 2000	
14	1:28:33	Wang Liping (CHN)	Dalian, PR China	03 06 2000	
15	1:28:38	Annarita Sidoti (ITA)	Eisenhüttenstadt, Germany	17 06 2000	
16	1:28:52	Natalya Fedoskina (RUS)	Hildesheim, Germany	09 07 2000	
17	1:28:56	Jane Saville (AUS)	Vallensbæk, Denmark	06 05 2000	
18	1:28:56	Larisa Ramazanova (BLR)	Soligorsk, Belarus	13 05 2000	
19	1:28:59	Norica Câmpean (ROM)	Eisenhüttenstadt, Germany	17 06 2000	
20	1:29:06	Valentina Savchuk (UKR)	Adler, Russia	20 02 2000	
21	1:29:23	Lyudmila Dolgopolova (BLR)	Soligorsk, Belarus	13 05 2000	
22	1:29:36	Kerry Saxby-Junna (AUS)	Naumburg, Germany	30 04 2000	
23	1:29:39	Claudia Stef (ROM)	Békéscsaba, Hungary	09 04 2000	
24	1:29:39	Yuliya Voyevodina (RUS)	Moscow, Russia	19 05 2000	
25	1:29:47	Rossella Giordano (ITA)	Hildesheim, Germany	09 07 2000	
