= 1999 in race walking =

This page lists the World Best Year Performance in 1999 in both the men's and the women's race walking distances: 20 km and 50 km (outdoor). One of the main events during this season were the 1999 World Athletics Championships in Seville, Spain. Guatemala's Julio René Martínez broke the world record in the men's 20 km, clocking 1:17:46 on May 8, 1999, in Eisenhüttenstadt, Germany.

== Abbreviations ==
- All times shown are in hours:minutes:seconds

| WR | world record |
| AR | area record |
| CR | event record |
| NR | national record |
| PB | personal best |

== Men's 20 km ==
=== Records ===
Standing records prior to the 1999 season in track and field
| World Record | Bu Lingtang (CHN) | 1:18:04 | April 7, 1994 | Beijing, PR China |
Broken records during the 1999 season in track and field
| World Record | Julio René Martínez (GUA) | 1:17:46 | May 8, 1999 | Eisenhüttenstadt, Germany |

=== 1999 World Year Ranking ===
| Rank | Time | Athlete | Venue | Date | Note |
|---|---|---|---|---|---|
| 1 | 1:17:46 | Julio René Martínez (GUA) | Eisenhüttenstadt, Germany | 08/05/1999 | WR |
| 2 | 1:17:56 | Alejandro López (MEX) | Eisenhüttenstadt, Germany | 08/05/1999 | |
| 3 | 1:18:40 | Robert Korzeniowski (POL) | Turku, Finland | 22/05/1999 | |
| 4 | 1:18:50 | Ilya Markov (RUS) | Turku, Finland | 22/05/1999 | |
| 5 | 1:19:00 | Joel Sánchez (MEX) | Eisenhüttenstadt, Germany | 08/05/1999 | |
| 6 | 1:19:05 | Daniel García (MEX) | Eisenhüttenstadt, Germany | 08/05/1999 | |
| 7 | 1:19:24 | Andreas Erm (GER) | Eisenhüttenstadt, Germany | 08/05/1999 | |
| 8 | 1:19:36 | Roman Rasskazov (RUS) | Saransk, Russia | 12/06/1999 | |
| 9 | 1:19:46 | Hatem Ghoula (TUN) | Calella, Spain | 09/05/1999 | |
| 10 | 1:19:55 | Rishat Shafikov (RUS) | Adler, Russia | 07/02/1999 | |
| 11 | 1:19:57 | Dmitriy Yesipchuk (RUS) | Adler, Russia | 07/02/1999 | |
| 11 | 1:19:57 | Vladimir Andreyev (RUS) | Cheboksary, Russia | 05/09/1999 | |
| 13 | 1:20:01 | Aleksey Kronin (RUS) | Adler, Russia | 07/02/1999 | |
| 14 | 1:20:12 | Noé Hernández (MEX) | Wajima, Japan | 18/04/1999 | |
| 15 | 1:20:15 | Nathan Deakes (AUS) | Adelaide, Australia | 26/01/1999 | |
| 15 | 1:20:15 | Daisuke Ikeshima (JPN) | Kobe, Japan | 31/01/1999 | |
| 17 | 1:20:17 | Bernardo Segura (MEX) | Winnipeg, Canada | 26/07/1999 | |
| 18 | 1:20:21 | Vladimir Stankin (RUS) | Adler, Russia | 07/02/1999 | |
| 18 | 1:20:21 | Yu Guohui (CHN) | Mézidon-Canon, France | 01/05/1999 | |
| 20 | 1:20:31 | Aigars Fadejevs (LAT) | Hildesheim, Germany | 12/09/1999 | |
| 21 | 1:20:45 | Ivan Trotskiy (BLR) | Calella, Spain | 09/05/1999 | |
| 22 | 1:20:46 | Jefferson Pérez (ECU) | Winnipeg, Canada | 26/07/1999 | |
| 23 | 1:20:47 | Valentin Kononen (FIN) | Kyyjärvi, Finland | 17/07/1999 | |
| 24 | 1:20:49 | Dion Russell (AUS) | Melbourne, Australia | 19/03/1999 | |
| 25 | 1:20:54 | Yevgeniy Misyulya (BLR) | Calella, Spain | 09/05/1999 | |

== Men's 50 km ==
=== Records ===
Standing records prior to the 1999 season in track and field
| World Record | Andrey Perlov (URS) | 3:37:41 | August 5, 1989 | Leningrad, Soviet Union |

=== 1999 World Year Ranking ===
| Rank | Time | Athlete | Venue | Date | Note |
|---|---|---|---|---|---|
| 1 | 3:39:22 | Sergey Korepanov (KAZ) | Mézidon-Canon, France | 02/05/1999 | |
| 2 | 3:40:08 | Tomasz Lipiec (POL) | Mézidon-Canon, France | 02/05/1999 | |
| 3 | 3:40:13 | Nikolay Matyukhin (RUS) | Mézidon-Canon, France | 02/05/1999 | |
| 4 | 3:40:40 | Jesús Angel García (ESP) | Mézidon-Canon, France | 02/05/1999 | |
| 5 | 3:40:54 | German Skurygin (RUS) | Mézidon-Canon, France | 02/05/1999 | |
| 6 | 3:41:56 | Yevgeniy Shmaliuk (RUS) | Mézidon-Canon, France | 02/05/1999 | |
| 7 | 3:43:15 | Viktor Ginko (BLR) | Mézidon-Canon, France | 02/05/1999 | |
| 8 | 3:44:18 | Oleg Ishutkin (RUS) | Saransk, Russia | 13/06/1999 | |
| 9 | 3:45:29 | Valentí Massana (ESP) | Mézidon-Canon, France | 02/05/1999 | |
| 10 | 3:46:36 | Aigars Fadejevs (LAT) | Mézidon-Canon, France | 02/05/1999 | |
| 11 | 3:47:16 | Valeriy Spitsyn (RUS) | Saransk, Russia | 13/06/1999 | |
| 12 | 3:47:54 | Ivano Brugnetti (ITA) | Sevilla, Spain | 25/08/1999 | |
| 13 | 3:48:01 | Aleksandar Raković (YUG) | Mézidon-Canon, France | 02/05/1999 | |
| 14 | 3:48:04 | Curt Clausen (USA) | Mézidon-Canon, France | 02/05/1999 | |
| 15 | 3:48:05 | Denis Trautmann (GER) | Mézidon-Canon, France | 02/05/1999 | |
| 16 | 3:48:14 | Craig Barrett (NZL) | Mézidon-Canon, France | 02/05/1999 | |
| 17 | 3:48:27 | Santiago Pérez (ESP) | Mézidon-Canon, France | 02/05/1999 | |
| 18 | 3:48:30 | Modris Liepiņš (LAT) | Mézidon-Canon, France | 02/05/1999 | |
| 19 | 3:48:42 | Daniel Plaza (ESP) | Torrevieja, Spain | 21/03/1999 | |
| 20 | 3:48:55 | Basilio Labrador (ESP) | Mézidon-Canon, France | 02/05/1999 | |
| 21 | 3:48:56 | Denis Langlois (FRA) | Mézidon-Canon, France | 02/05/1999 | |
| 22 | 3:49:07 | Dmitriy Dolnikov (RUS) | Saransk, Russia | 13/06/1999 | |
| 23 | 3:49:22 | Robert Ihly (GER) | Mézidon-Canon, France | 02/05/1999 | |
| 24 | 3:49:51 | Joel Sánchez (MEX) | Naucalpan, Mexico | 21/03/1999 | |
| 25 | 3:49:53 | Miguel Angel Rodríguez (MEX) | Mézidon-Canon, France | 02/05/1999 | |

== Women's 20 km ==
=== Records ===
Standing records prior to the 1999 season in track and field
| World Record | Liu Hongyu (CHN) | 1:27:30 | May 1, 1995 | Beijing, PR China |

=== 1999 World Year Ranking ===
| Rank | Time | Athlete | Venue | Date | Note |
|---|---|---|---|---|---|
| 1 | 1:27:30 | Nadezhda Ryashkina (RUS) | Adler, Russia | 07/02/1999 | WR |
| 2 | 1:27:32 | Liu Hongyu (CHN) | Mézidon-Canon, France | 02/05/1999 | |
| 3 | 1:27:35 | Natalya Fedoskina (RUS) | Mézidon-Canon, France | 02/05/1999 | |
| 4 | 1:27:46 | Norica Câmpean (ROM) | Békéscsaba, Hungary | 28/03/1999 | |
| 5 | 1:28:01 | Yelena Nikolayeva (RUS) | Adler, Russia | 07/02/1999 | |
| 6 | 1:28:21 | Olimpiada Ivanova (RUS) | Cheboksary, Russia | 04/09/1999 | |
| 7 | 1:28:33 | Tamara Kovalenko (RUS) | Adler, Russia | 07/02/1999 | |
| 8 | 1:28:35 | Kjersti Plätzer (NOR) | Os, Norway | 25/09/1999 | |
| 9 | 1:28:40 | Natalya Misyulya (BLR) | Brest-Litevsk, Belarus | 04/06/1999 | |
| 10 | 1:28:51 | Olga Kardopoltseva (BLR) | Brest-Litevsk, Belarus | 04/06/1999 | |
| 11 | 1:28:58 | Larisa Ramazanova (BLR) | Brest-Litevsk, Belarus | 04/06/1999 | |
| 12 | 1:29:00 | Irina Stankina (RUS) | Saransk, Russia | 12/06/1999 | |
| 13 | 1:29:09 | Olga Polyakova (RUS) | Adler, Russia | 07/02/1999 | |
| 14 | 1:29:15 | Wang Yan (CHN) | Mézidon-Canon, France | 02/05/1999 | |
| 15 | 1:29:20 | Valentina Tsybulskaya (BLR) | Brest-Litevsk, Belarus | 04/06/1999 | |
| 16 | 1:29:23 | Svetlana Tolstaya (KAZ) | Almaty, Kazakhstan | 27/03/1999 | |
| 17 | 1:29:39 | Claudia Iovan (ROM) | Mézidon-Canon, France | 02/05/1999 | |
| 18 | 1:30:03 | Gao Hongmiao (CHN) | Mézidon-Canon, France | 02/05/1999 | |
| 18 | 1:30:03 | Graciela Mendoza (MEX) | Mézidon-Canon, France | 02/05/1999 | |
| 20 | 1:30:07 | Yuliya Voyevodina (RUS) | Adler, Russia | 07/02/1999 | |
| 21 | 1:30:12 | Lyudmila Yefimkina (RUS) | Saransk, Russia | 12/06/1999 | |
| 22 | 1:30:13 | Susana Feitor (POR) | Mézidon-Canon, France | 02/05/1999 | |
| 23 | 1:30:34 | Olga Panfyorova (RUS) | Adler, Russia | 07/02/1999 | |
| 24 | 1:30:35 | Hong Li (CHN) | Mézidon-Canon, France | 02/05/1999 | |
| 25 | 1:30:49 | Elke Ennemoser (ITA) | Prato, Italy | 11/09/1999 | |

== See also ==
- 1999 IAAF World Race Walking Cup
