= 2001 in race walking =

This page lists the World Best Year Performance in the year 2001 in both the men's and the women's race walking distances: 20 km and 50 km (outdoor). One of the main events during this season were the 2001 World Athletics Championships in Edmonton, Alberta, Canada.

== Abbreviations ==
- All times shown are in hours:minutes:seconds

WR	world record
AR	area record
CR	event record
NR	national record
PB	personal best

== Men's 20 km ==
=== Records ===
Standing records prior to the 2001 season in track and field
World Record	Julio René Martínez (GUA)	1:17:46	May 8, 1999	Eisenhüttenstadt, Germany
World Record	Roman Rasskazov (RUS)	1:17:46	May 19, 2000	Moscow, Russia

=== 2001 World Year Ranking ===
Rank	Time	Athlete	Venue	Date	Note
1	1:18:05	Dmitriy Yesipchuk (RUS)	Adler, Russia	04/03/2001	
2	1:18:06	Viktor Burayev (RUS)	Adler, Russia	04/03/2001	
3	1:18:14	Nathan Deakes (AUS)	Dublin, Ireland	16/06/2001	
4	1:18:20	Denis Nizhegorodov (RUS)	Adler, Russia	04/03/2001	
5	1:19:14	Vladimir Stankin (RUS)	Adler, Russia	04/03/2001	
6	1:19:32	Andreas Erm (GER)	Eisenhüttenstadt, Germany	09/06/2001	
7	1:19:36	Ilya Markov (RUS)	Calella, Spain	22/04/2001	
8	1:19:45	Yevgeniy Misyulya (BLR)	Dudince, Slovakia	19/05/2001	
9	1:19:47	Paquillo Fernández (ESP)	Calella, Spain	22/04/2001	
10	1:19:53	Aigars Fadejevs (LAT)	Calella, Spain	22/04/2001	
12	1:20:14	Vladimir Andreyev (RUS)	Dudince, Slovakia	19/05/2001	
13	1:20:21	Jiří Malysa (CZE)	Dudince, Slovakia	19/05/2001	
14	1:20:31	Roman Rasskazov (RUS)	Edmonton, Canada	04/08/2001	
14	1:20:31	Robert Korzeniowski (POL)	Rumia, Poland	07/10/2001	
16	1:20:45	Aleksey Kronin (RUS)	Cheboksary, Russia	16 06 2001	
17	1:20:49	Alejandro López (MEX)	Eisenhüttenstadt, Germany	09/06/2001	
17	1:20:49	Li Zewen (CHN)	Guangzhou, PR China	19/11/2001	
19	1:20:58	Pei Chuang (CHN)	Guangzhou, PR China	19/11/2001	
20	1:21:04	Yu Chaohong (CHN)	Guangzhou, PR China	19/11/2001	
21	1:21:09	David Márquez (ESP)	Edmonton, Canada	04/08/2001	
22	1:21:11	Robert Heffernan (IRL)	Royal Leamington, Great Britain	21/04/2001	
23	1:21:15	He Xiaodong (CHN)	Dandong, PR China	13/04/2001	
24	1:21:20	Satoshi Yanagisawa (JPN)	Kobe, Japan	28/01/2001	
24	1:21:20	Cristian Berdeja (MEX)	Turku, Finland	03/06/2001	

== Men's 50 km ==
=== Records ===
Standing records prior to the 2001 season in track and field
World Record	Valeriy Spitsyn (RUS)	3:37:26	May 21, 2000	Moscow, Russia

=== 2001 World Year Ranking ===
Rank	Time	Athlete	Venue	Date	Note
1	3:42:08	Robert Korzeniowski (POL)	Edmonton, Canada	11/08/2001	
2	3:43:07	Jesús Angel García (ESP)	Edmonton, Canada	11/08/2001	
3	3:43:43	Nathan Deakes (AUS)	Naumburg, Germany	08/04/2001	
4	3:44:28	Wang Yinhang (CHN)	Guangzhou, PR China	23/11/2001	
5	3:44:32	Aleksey Voyevodin (RUS)	Cheboksary, Russia	17/06/2001	
6	3:44:50	Germán Sánchez (MEX)	Cheboksary, Russia	17/06/2001	
7	3:45:22	Mikel Odriozola (ESP)	Mollet del Vallés, Spain	18/03/2001	
8	3:45:46	Yu Guoping (CHN)	Guangzhou, PR China	23/11/2001	
9	3:45:48	Nikolay Matyukhin (RUS)	Dudince, Slovakia	19/05/2001	
10	3:46:12	Vladimir Potemin (RUS)	Dudince, Slovakia	19/05/2001	
11	3:46:12	Edgar Hernández (MEX)	Edmonton, Canada	11/08/2001	
12	3:46:20	Aigars Fadejevs (LAT)	Edmonton, Canada	11/08/2001	
13	3:46:52	Santiago Pérez (ESP)	Dudince, Slovakia	19/05/2001	
14	3:47:04	Yu Chaohong (CHN)	Guangzhou, PR China	23/11/2001	
15	3:47:34	Yu Guohui (CHN)	Guangzhou, PR China	23/11/2001	
16	3:48:05	Craig Barrett (NZL)	New Plymouth, New Zealand	16/06/2001	
17	3:48:06	Denis Langlois (FRA)	Dudince, Slovakia	19/05/2001	
18	3:48:28	Valentí Massana (ESP)	Edmonton, Canada	11/08/2001	
19	3:48:41	Sándor Urbanik (HUN)	Dudince, Slovakia	24/03/2001	
20	3:48:51	Tomasz Lipiec (POL)	Naumburg, Germany	08/04/2001	
21	3:50:24	Ma Hongye (CHN)	Guangzhou, PR China	23/11/2001	
22	3:50:28	Viktor Ginko (BLR)	Naumburg, Germany	08/04/2001	
23	3:50:29	Mario Avellaneda (ESP)	Mollet del Vallés, Spain	18/03/2001	
24	3:50:32	Andrey Plotnikov (RUS)	Cheboksary, Russia	17/06/2001	
25	3:50:46	Curt Clausen (USA)	Edmonton, Canada	11/08/2001	

== Women's 20 km ==
=== Records ===
Standing records prior to the 2001 season in track and field
World Record	Tatyana Gudkova (RUS)	1:25:18	May 19, 2000	Adler, Russia

=== 2001 World Year Ranking ===
Rank	Time	Athlete	Venue	Date	Note
1	1:24:50	Olimpiada Ivanova (RUS)	Adler, Russia	04/03/2001	
2	1:26:22	Wang Yan (CHN)	Guangzhou, PR China	19/11/2001	
3	1:26:23	Wang Liping (CHN)	Guangzhou, PR China	19/11/2001	
4	1:26:35	Liu Hongyu (CHN)	Guangzhou, PR China	19/11/2001	
5	1:26:50	Natalya Fedoskina (RUS)	Dudince, Slovakia	19/05/2001	
6	1:27:09	Elisabetta Perrone (ITA)	Dudince, Slovakia	19/05/2001	
7	1:27:29	Erica Alfridi (ITA)	Dudince, Slovakia	19/05/2001	
8	1:27:33	Tatyana Sibileva (RUS)	Adler, Russia	04/03/2001	
9	1:27:55	Susana Feitor (POR)	Rio Maior, Portugal	07/04/2001	
10	1:28:11	Yelena Nikolayeva (RUS)	Cheboksary, Russia	16/06/2001	
11	1:28:45	Gao Hongmiao (CHN)	Dandong, PR China	13/04/2001	
12	1:28:49	Valentina Tsybulskaya (BLR)	Edmonton, Canada	09/08/2001	
13	1:28:56	Valentyna Savchuk (UKR)	Adler, Russia	04/03/2001	
14	1:29:08	Olga Lukyanchuk (UKR)	Adler, Russia	04/03/2001	
15	1:29:25	Norica Câmpean (ROM)	Dudince, Slovakia	19/05/2001	
16	1:29:31	Jian Xingli (CHN)	Guangzhou, PR China	19/11/2001	
17	1:29:36	Maya Sazonova (KAZ)	Almaty, Kazakhstan	31/03/2001	
18	1:29:39	Gao Kelian (CHN)	Guangzhou, PR China	19/11/2001	
19	1:29:43	Li Hong (CHN)	Dandong, PR China	13/04/2001	
20	1:29:44	Wang Qinqin (CHN)	Guangzhou, PR China	19/11/2001	
21	1:29:47	Pan Hailian (CHN)	Guangzhou, PR China	19/11/2001	
22	1:29:54	Elisa Rigaudo (ITA)	Amsterdam, Netherlands	15/07/2001	
23	1:29:55	Kjersti Plätzer (NOR)	Eisenhüttenstadt, Germany	09/06/2001	
24	1:29:57	Gillian O'Sullivan (IRL)	Douglas, Ireland	17/02/2001	
25	1:30:00	Xu Aihui (CHN)	Dandong, PR China	13/04/2001	
