= Athletics at the 2001 Summer Universiade – Women's 10 kilometres walk =

The women's 10 kilometres walk event at the 2001 Summer Universiade was held in Beijing, China on 29 August.

== Results ==
Rank	Athlete	Nationality	Time	Notes
1st place, gold medalist(s)	Gao Hongmiao	China	43:20	UR
2nd place, silver medalist(s)	Susana Feitor	Portugal	43:40	
3rd place, bronze medalist(s)	Wang Liping	China	44:01	
4	Tatyana Gudkova	Russia	44:14	
5	María Guadalupe Sánchez	Mexico	45:00	
6	Valentyna Savchuk	Ukraine	45:08	
7	Kim Mi-Jung	South Korea	45:49	
8	Larisa Safronova	Russia	46:01	
9	Eva Pérez	Spain	46:21	
10	Athina Papagianni	Greece	47:44	
11	Sylwia Korzeniowska	Poland	47:54	
12	Mara Ibañez	Mexico	48:09	
	Athanasia Tsoumeleka	Greece	DNF	
	Elisa Rigaudo	Italy	DNF	
	Elena Ginko	Belarus	DQ	
	Sara Stevenson	United States	DQ	
