= Athletics at the 1999 Summer Universiade – Women's 10 kilometres walk =

The women's 10 kilometres walk event at the 1999 Summer Universiade was held in Palma de Mallorca, Spain on 10 July.

== Results ==
Rank	Athlete	Nationality	Time	Notes
1st place, gold medalist(s)	Claudia Iovan	Romania	44:22	
2nd place, silver medalist(s)	Rossella Giordano	Italy	44:39	
3rd place, bronze medalist(s)	Valentyna Savchuk	Ukraine	45:23	
4	Rocío Florido	Spain	45:51	
5	Olga Polyakova	Russia	45:57	
6	Zhu Qiamei	China	46:22	
7	María Sánchez	Mexico	46:37	
8	Gillian O'Sullivan	Ireland	46:45	SB
9	Eva Pérez	Spain	47:24	
10	Mara Ibañez	Mexico	48:04	
11	Sofia Avoila	Portugal	48:23	
12	Annett Amberg	Germany	48:47	
13	Ilhem Kerchouni	Algeria	56:34	
	Carma Watson	New Zealand	DNF	
	Susana Feitor	Portugal	DNF	
	Alena Hinko	Belarus	DQ	
	Susan Vermeullen	South Africa	DQ	
	Tatyana Lyudkova	Russia	DQ	
	Danielle Kirk	United States	DQ	
	Jill Zenner	United States	DQ	
