= 2001 World Championships in Athletics – Women's 20 kilometres walk =

The official results of the Women's 20 km Walk at the 2001 World Championships in Edmonton, Alberta, Canada, held on Thursday 9 August 2001.

== Medalists ==
Gold	Olimpiada Ivanova; Russia (RUS)
Silver	Valentina Tsybulskaya; Belarus (BLR)
Bronze	Elisabetta Perrone; Italy (ITA)

== Abbreviations ==
- All times shown are in hours:minutes:seconds

DNS	did not start
NM	no mark
WR	world record
WL	world leading
AR	area record
NR	national record
PB	personal best
SB	season best

=== Records ===
Standing records prior to the 2001 World Athletics Championships
World Record	Olimpiada Ivanova (RUS)	1:24:50	March 4, 2001	Adler, Russia
Event Record	Liu Hongyu (CHN)	1:30:50	August 27, 1999	Seville, Spain
Broken records during the 2001 World Athletics Championships
Event Record	Olimpiada Ivanova (RUS)	1:27:48	August 9, 2001	Edmonton, Canada

== Final ranking ==
Rank	Athlete	Time	Note
1st place, gold medalist(s)	Olimpiada Ivanova (RUS)	1:27:48	CR
2nd place, silver medalist(s)	Valentina Tsybulskaya (BLR)	1:28:49	PB
3rd place, bronze medalist(s)	Elisabetta Perrone (ITA)	1:28:56	
4	Erica Alfridi (ITA)	1:29:48	
5	María Vasco (ESP)	1:30:19	
6	Norica Câmpean (ROM)	1:30:39	
7	Melanie Seeger (GER)	1:30:41	NR
8	Annarita Sidoti (ITA)	1:31:40	SB
9	María Guadalupe Sánchez (MEX)	1:32:27	SB
10	Victoria Palacios (MEX)	1:33:52	PB
11	Athina Papayianni (GRE)	1:34:56	
12	Nevena Mineva (BUL)	1:35:18	PB
13	Olive Loughnane (IRL)	1:35:24	
14	Kim Mi-Jung (KOR)	1:35:30	
15	Vira Zozulya (UKR)	1:35:32	
16	Geovana Irusta (BOL)	1:36:50	
17	Anne Haaland-Simonsen (NOR)	1:37:11	
18	Sonata Milušauskaitė (LTU)	1:37:33	
19	Debbi Lawrence (USA)	1:37:57	SB
20	Karen Foan (CAN)	1:38:09	PB
21	Sofia Avoila (POR)	1:39:10	
22	Mara Ibañez (MEX)	1:39:26	
23	Fatiha Ouali (FRA)	1:40:16	
24	Kaori Nikaido (JPN)	1:40:57	
25	Jill Zenner (USA)	1:42:43	
26	Teresita Collado (GUA)	1:42:43	
27	Angela Keogh (NFI)	2:08:46	
DISQUALIFIED (DSQ)
—	Liu Hongyu (CHN)	DSQ	
—	Gillian O'Sullivan (IRL)	DSQ	
—	Natalya Fedoskina (RUS)	DSQ	
—	Ryoko Tadamasa (JPN)	DSQ	
—	Svetlana Tolstaya (KAZ)	DSQ	
—	Inês Henriques (POR)	DSQ	
—	Sun Chunfang (CHN)	DSQ	
—	Jane Saville (AUS)	DSQ	
—	Michelle Rohl (USA)	DSQ	
—	Kerry Saxby-Junna (AUS)	DSQ	
—	Maya Sazonova (KAZ)	DSQ	
—	Hristina Kokotou (GRE)	DSQ	
—	Yelena Nikolayeva (RUS)	DSQ	
—	Kjersti Plätzer (NOR)	DSQ	
—	Susana Feitor (POR)	DSQ	

== See also ==
- 1998 Women's European Championships 10km Walk (Budapest)
- 2000 Women's Olympic 20km Walk (Sydney)
- 2001 Race Walking Year Ranking
- 2002 Women's European Championships 20km Walk (Munich)
- 2004 Women's Olympic 20km Walk (Athens)
