= Athletics at the 2000 Summer Olympics – Women's 20 kilometres walk =

Women's 20 kilometres walk at the Games of the XXVII Olympiad
- Venue: Stadium Australia
- Date: 28 September
- Competitors: 57 from 30 nations
- Winning time: 1:29:05 OR

Medalists
1st place, gold medalist(s)		Liping Wang; China
2nd place, silver medalist(s)		Kjersti Plätzer; Norway
3rd place, bronze medalist(s)		María Vasco; Spain

These are the official results of the Women's 20 km Walk at the 2000 Summer Olympics in Sydney, Australia. The race was held on Thursday 28 September 2000, starting at 10:45h.

The event may be best remembered for the disqualification of hometown athlete Jane Saville. Saville was leading the race and entered the final stretch of the race inside the stadium before she was flagged for her third violation for lifting her feet off the ground, which led to her disqualification.

== Medalists ==
Gold	Wang Liping; China
Silver	Kjersti Plätzer; Norway
Bronze	María Vasco; Spain

== Abbreviations ==
- All times shown are in hours:minutes:seconds

DNS	did not start
NM	no mark
OR	olympic record
WR	world record
AR	area record
NR	national record
PB	personal best
SB	season best

== Records ==
Standing records prior to the 2004 Summer Olympics
World record	Tatyana Gudkova (RUS)	1:25:18	19 May 2000	Moscow, Russia
Olympic record	New event after the 10 km was contested previously			

No new world record was established in the competition. By winning the event, Wang Liping established the Olympic record, 1:29.05.

== Final ranking ==
Rank	Athlete	Country	Time	Note
1st place, gold medalist(s)	Wang Liping	China	1:29.05	OR
2nd place, silver medalist(s)	Kjersti Plätzer	Norway	1:29.33	
3rd place, bronze medalist(s)	María Vasco	Spain	1:30.23	
4	Erica Alfridi	Italy	1:31.25	
5	María Guadalupe Sánchez	Mexico	1:31.33	
6	Norica Câmpean	Romania	1:31.50	
7	Kerry Saxby-Junna	Australia	1:32.02	
8	Tatyana Gudkova	Russia	1:32.35	
9	Nataliya Misyulya	Belarus	1:33.08	
10	Gillian O'Sullivan	Ireland	1:33.10	
11	Athina Papayianni	Greece	1:33.14	PB
12	Valentyna Savchuk	Ukraine	1:33.22	
13	Ana Maria Groza	Romania	1:33.38	
14	Susana Feitor	Portugal	1:33.53	
15	Yuan Yufang	Malaysia	1:34.19	SB
16	Kristina Saltanovič	Lithuania	1:34.24	
17	Michelle Rohl	United States	1:34.26	
18	Mária Urbanik	Hungary	1:34.45	
19	Beate Gummelt	Germany	1:34.59	
20	Encarna Granados	Spain	1:35.06	
21	Svetlana Tolstaya	Kazakhstan	1:35.19	
22	Nora Leksir	France	1:35.29	
23	Fatiha Ouali	France	1:35.35	
24	Vira Zozulya	Ukraine	1:35.43	
25	Kim Mi-Jung	South Korea	1:36.09	NR
26	Mara Ibañez	Mexico	1:36.17	
27	Eva Pérez	Spain	1:36.35	
28	Valentina Tsybulskaya	Belarus	1:36.44	
29	Anikó Szebenszky	Hungary	1:36.46	
30	Jolanta Dukure	Latvia	1:36.54	
31	Sonata Milušauskaitė	Lithuania	1:37.14	
32	Larisa Ramazanova	Belarus	1:37.39	
33	Lisa Kehler	Great Britain	1:37.47	
34	Ivis Martínez	El Salvador	1:38.07	
35	Olive Loughnane	Ireland	1:38.23	
36	Khristina Kokotou	Greece	1:38.52	
37	Anita Liepiņa	Latvia	1:39.17	
38	Chen Yueling	United States	1:39.36	
39	Lisa Sheridan-Paolini	Australia	1:40.57	
40	Yelena Kuznetsova	Kazakhstan	1:42.45	
41	Teresita Collado	Guatemala	1:43.28	
42	Geovana Irusta	Bolivia	1:43.34	
43	Zuzana Blažeková	Slovakia	1:44.03	
44	Debbi Lawrence	United States	1:47.20	
45	Bahia Boussad	Algeria	1:52.50	
—	Kathrin Born-Boyde	Germany	DNF	
—	Aida İsayeva	Azerbaijan	DNF	
—	Olga Polyakova	Russia	DNF	
—	Katarzyna Radtke	Poland	DNF	
—	Annarita Sidoti	Italy	DNF	
—	Maya Sazonova	Kazakhstan	DNF	
—	Irina Stankina	Russia	DNF	
—	Liu Hongyu	China	DSQ	
—	Graciela Mendoza	Mexico	DSQ	
—	Janice McCaffrey	Canada	DSQ	
—	Elisabetta Perrone	Italy	DSQ	
—	Jane Saville	Australia	DSQ	

== See also ==
- 1997 Women's World Championships 10 km Walk (Athens)
- 1998 Women's European Championships 10 km Walk (Budapest)
- 1999 Women's World Championships 20 km Walk (Seville)
- 2000 Race Walking Year Ranking
- 2001 Women's World Championships 20 km Walk (Edmonton)
- 2002 Women's European Championships 20 km Walk (Munich)
- 2003 Women's World Championships 20 km Walk (Paris)
