= Olive Loughnane =

Irish racewalker and sports administrator (born 1976)

Personal information
- Born: 14 January 1976 (age 50)
- Education: University College Galway (B.Comm.)
- Height: 1.68 m (5 ft 6 in)
- Weight: 53 kg (117 lb)

Sport
- Country: Ireland
- Sport: Athletics
- Event: 20km Race Walk
Medal record
World Championships
Gold medal – first place	2009 Berlin	20 km walk

Olive Loughnane (born 14 January 1976) is an Irish retired racewalker. A four-times Olympian and was 2009 World champion in the 20 km walk.

== Early life ==
Loughane was born in 1976 in County Cork, the eldest of seven children. She moved to Carrabane, County Galway, with her family when she was a child. She is a graduate of University College Galway, having obtained a B.Comm. in 1996.

== Sporting career ==
Loughnane competed at four Olympic Games (2000, 2004, 2008 and 2012) and six consecutive editions of the World Championships in Athletics. She won a gold medal at the 2009 World Championships after the disqualification of the original gold medallist for a drug offence. As of December 2016, Loughnane had not received the prize money.

Loughnane failed to finish the walk at the 2010 European Athletics Championships. She had a win on the 2011 World Race Walking circuit at the Dudinska Patdesiatka in March 2011.

Loughnane announced her retirement in February 2013.

=== Achievements ===
Year	Competition	Venue	Position	Event	Notes
Representing Ireland
1999	World Race Walking Cup	Mézidon-Canon, France	91st	20 km	1:48:04
2000	Olympic Games	Sydney, Australia	35th	20 km	1:38:23
2001	European Race Walking Cup	Dudince, Slovakia	26th	20 km	1:36:50
2001	World Championships	Edmonton, Canada	13th	20 km	1:35:24
2002	European Championships	Munich, Germany	13th	20 km	1:33:08
2002	World Race Walking Cup	Turin, Italy	—	20 km	DNF
2003	World Championships	Paris, France	12th	20 km	1:30:53
2004	Olympic Games	Athens, Greece	—	20 km	DNF
2005	World Championships	Helsinki, Finland	—	20 km	DQ
2007	World Championships	Osaka, Japan	17th	20 km	1:36:00
2008	Olympic Games	Beijing, China	7th	20 km	1:27:45
2008	World Race Walking Cup	Cheboksary, Russia	6th	20 km	1:29:17
2009	European Race Walking Cup	Metz, France	4th	20 km	1:34:52
2009	World Championships	Berlin, Germany	1st	20 km	1:28:58
2010	European Championships	Barcelona, Spain	—	20 km	DNF
2011	European Race Walking Cup	Olhão, Portugal	—	20 km	DQ
2011	World Championships	Daegu, South Korea	13th	20 km	1:34:02
2012	World Race Walking Cup	Saransk, Russia	5th	20 km	1:31:32
2012	Olympic Games	London, United Kingdom	10th	20 km	1:29:39

== Sports administration ==
Loughnane became a member of the Sport Ireland High Performance Committee after retiring from competitive sport in 2013, and subsequently became of a member of the board of Sport Ireland.

== Personal life ==
Loughnane currently lives in Coachford, Cork with her husband, Martin Corkery, and their three children. She currently works as a Statistician in the Central Statistics Office (CSO).
