= Akihiko Koike =

Japanese race walker

Akihiko Koike (Japanese: 小池 昭彦; born April 10, 1973) is a retired male race walker from Nagano, Japan. He set his personal best (1:20.16) in the men's 20 km on January 30, 2000, in Kobe. He made two major global appearances: first at the 1999 World Championships in Athletics, where he was 27th in the men's 50 km walk, and secondly at the 2000 Sydney Olympics, where he failed to finish the 20 km race.

== Achievements ==
Year	Competition	Venue	Position	Notes
Representing Japan
1999	World Race Walking Cup	Mézidon-Canon, France	43rd	50 km
1999	World Championships	Seville, Spain	27th	50 km
2000	Olympic Games	Sydney, Australia	DSQ	20 km
