= 2002 Asian Athletics Championships – Women's 20 kilometres walk =

Women's 20-kms Walk Event in the 2002 AAC was held in Sri Lanka, dated August 11th

The women's 20 kilometres walk event at the 2002 Asian Athletics Championships was held in Colombo, Sri Lanka on 11 August. It was the first time that the road 20 kilometres was staged at the Asian Championships replacing the track 10,000 metres.

== Results ==
Rank	Name	Nationality	Time	Notes
1st place, gold medalist(s)	Gao Kelian	China	1:36:57	CR
2nd place, silver medalist(s)	Jian Xingli	China	1:37:02	
3rd place, bronze medalist(s)	Ryoko Tadamasa	Japan	1:42:43	
4	Tersiana Riwu Rohi	Indonesia	1:47:02	SB
5	G.L.R. Priyadharshani	Sri Lanka	1:57:39	PB
6	M.M.K. Mapa	Sri Lanka	2:03:17	PB
	Maya Sazonova	Kazakhstan	DNF	
	Kim Mi-Jung	South Korea	DNF	
	Pramitha Wanigabudu	Sri Lanka	DNF	
