= Yelena Kuznetsova =

Kazakhstani racewalker

Yelena Nikolayevna Kuznetsova (Kazakh: Елена Николаевна Кузнецова; born August 4, 1977, in Almaty) is a female race walker from Kazakhstan. She set her personal best in the women's 20 km (1:32.23) on March 31, 2000, in Almaty.

== Achievements ==
| Year | Competition | Venue | Position | Notes |
Representing Kazakhstan
| 1997 | World Race Walking Cup | Poděbrady, Czech Republic | 84th | 10 km |
| 1999 | World Race Walking Cup | Mézidon-Canon, France | 19th | 20 km |
| 2000 | Olympic Games | Sydney, Australia | 40th | 20 km |
| 2002 | World Race Walking Cup | Turin, Italy | 52nd | 20 km |
| 2004 | Olympic Games | Athens, Greece | 50th | 20 km |
