= Athletics at the 1997 Summer Universiade – Women's 10 kilometres walk =

The women's 10 kilometres walk event at the 1997 Summer Universiade was held on 26 August on the streets of Catania, Italy.

== Results ==
Rank	Athlete	Nationality	Time	Notes
1st place, gold medalist(s)	Larisa Ramazanova	Belarus	44:01	
2nd place, silver medalist(s)	Rossella Giordano	Italy	44:31	
3rd place, bronze medalist(s)	Annarita Sidoti	Italy	44:38	
4	Susana Feitor	Portugal	45:24	
5	Claudia Iovan	Romania	46:04	
6	Vira Zozulya	Ukraine	46:23	
7	Mónika Pesti	Hungary	47:45	
8	Gillian O'Sullivan	Ireland	48:15	
9	Sonia Varas	Mexico	48:29	
10	Jane Saville	Australia	49:06	
11	Margaret Ditchburn	United States	51:45	
12	Nailze Pazim	Brazil	52:59	
13	Mimoza Xhafa	Albania	56:33	
	Jill Zenner	United States	DQ	
