= Athletics at the 2004 Summer Olympics – Women's 20 kilometres walk =

Women's 20 kilometres walk at the Games of the XXVIII Olympiad
- Olympic Athletics
- Venue: Athens Olympic Stadium
- Dates: 23 August
- Competitors: 57 from 35 nations
- Winning time: 1:29.12

Medalists
1st place, gold medalist(s)		Athanasia Tsoumeleka	Greece
2nd place, silver medalist(s)		Olimpiada Ivanova	Russia
3rd place, bronze medalist(s)		Jane Saville	Australia

The women's 20 kilometres race walk at the 2004 Summer Olympics as part of the athletics program was held through the streets of Athens with the start and finish at the Athens Olympic Stadium on August 23.

The race had started with a strong, good-sized bunch of fifty-seven walkers keeping together through the field. As the group left the stadium falling apart, Russia's Olimpiada Ivanova took the front of the pack on the opening 2k laps, followed by several of the anticipated favorites, which included 2000 Olympic champion Wang Liping, the Australian sisters Jane and Natalie Saville, and the Greek duo Athina Papayianni and Athanasia Tsoumeleka.

By the half way mark, fourteen walkers were still in close contention with Ivanova maintaining the lead and Belarus' Ryta Turava staying beside her to shorten the gap. As the Belarusian began to lose contact, Ivanova steadily broke away from the group to own the race, until Jane Saville set the pace much faster to chase her on the succeeding lap. With just 2k left to go, home favorite Tsoumeleka zoomed past the two remaining chasers Ivanova and Saville on a late charge to quickly build up a seemingly insurmountable lead.

Tsoumeleka walked into the final stretch to deliver the Greeks their first ever Olympic track and field gold medal at these Games. She finished the race in 1:29.12, just four seconds ahead of the eventual silver medalist Ivanova. Meanwhile, Saville had erased her setback of being disqualified at the Sydney Olympics four years earlier to successfully claim the bronze, holding Turava off the podium to fourth.

== Records ==
Prior to the competition, the existing World and Olympic records were as follows:

World record	Wang Yan (CHN)	1:26:22	Guangzhou, China	19 November 2001
Olympic record	Wang Liping (CHN)	1:29:05	Sydney, Australia	28 September 2000

No new records were set during the competition.

== Qualification ==
The qualification period for athletics was 1 January 2003 to 9 August 2004. For the women's 20 kilometres race walk, each National Olympic Committee was permitted to enter up to three athletes that had run the race in 1:33:30 or faster during the qualification period. If an NOC had no athletes that qualified under that standard, one athlete that had run the race in 1:38:00 or faster could be entered.

== Schedule ==
All times are Greece Standard Time (UTC+2)

Date	Time	Round
Monday, 23 August 2004	09:00	Final

== Results ==
Rank	Name	Nationality	Result	Notes
1st place, gold medalist(s)	Athanasia Tsoumeleka	Greece	1:29.12	PB
2nd place, silver medalist(s)	Olimpiada Ivanova	Russia	1:29.16	
3rd place, bronze medalist(s)	Jane Saville	Australia	1:29.25	
4	Ryta Turava	Belarus	1:29:39	
5	Melanie Seeger	Germany	1:29:52	
6	Elisa Rigaudo	Italy	1:29:57	
7	María Vasco	Spain	1:30:06	
8	Wang Liping	China	1:30:16	
9	Elena Ginko	Belarus	1:30:22	
10	Athina Papayianni	Greece	1:30:37	
11	Rossella Giordano	Italy	1:30:39	
12	Kjersti Plätzer	Norway	1:30:49	SB
13	Yuliya Voyevodina	Russia	1:31:02	
14	Song Hongjuan	China	1:31:27	
15	Valentina Tsybulskaya	Belarus	1:31:49	
16	Sabine Zimmer	Germany	1:31:59	
17	Yelena Nikolayeva	Russia	1:32:16	
18	Elisabetta Perrone	Italy	1:32:21	SB
19	Kristina Saltanovič	Lithuania	1:32:22	
20	Susana Feitor	Portugal	1:32:47	
21	Sylwia Korzeniowska	Poland	1:33:06	
22	Zuzana Maliková	Slovakia	1:33:17	
23	Sonata Milušauskaitė	Lithuania	1:33:36	
24	Barbora Dibelková	Czech Republic	1:33:37	
25	Inês Henriques	Portugal	1:33:53	
26	Maribel Gonçalves	Portugal	1:33:59	
27	Norica Câmpean	Romania	1:34:30	
28	Svetlana Tolstaya	Kazakhstan	1:34:43	
29	Ana Maria Groza	Romania	1:34:56	
30	Rocío Florido	Spain	1:35:32	
31	Hristina Kokotou	Greece	1:35:43	
32	Jiang Jing	China	1:35:56	
33	Yeliz Ay	Turkey	1:36:02	
34	Victoria Palacios	Mexico	1:36:07	
35	Yuan Yufang	Malaysia	1:36:34	
36	Natalie Saville	Australia	1:36:54	
37	Daniela Cîrlan	Romania	1:37:14	
38	Cheryl Webb	Australia	1:37:40	
39	Marie Polli	Switzerland	1:37:53	
40	Mayumi Kawasaki	Japan	1:37:56	
41	Geovana Irusta	Bolivia	1:38:36	
42	Vira Zozulya	Ukraine	1:38:45	
43	Teresa Vaill	United States	1:38:47	
44	Edina Füsti	Hungary	1:39:45	
45	Anita Liepiņa	Latvia	1:39:54	
46	Sandra Zapata	Colombia	1:42:22	
47	Nicolene Cronje	South Africa	1:42:37	
48	Alessandra Picagevicz	Brazil	1:46:21	
49	Teresita Collado	Guatemala	1:46:41	
50	Yelena Kuznetsova	Kazakhstan	1:49:08	
51	Yolene Raffin	Mauritius	1:49:28	
52	Fumilay Fonseca	São Tomé and Príncipe	2:04:54	PB
	Olive Loughnane	Ireland	DNF	
	Rosario Sánchez	Mexico	DNF	
	Nevena Mineva	Bulgaria	DNF	
	María Teresa Gargallo	Spain	DSQ	
	Kim Mi-jung	South Korea	DSQ	
