= Yolene Raffin =

Mauritian racewalker

Personal information
- Nationality: Mauritian
- Born: 17 August 1981 (age 45) rodrigues
- Height: 158
- Weight: 56

Sport
- Sport: Athletics
- Event: Racewalking

Marie Yolène Raffin (born 17 August 1981) is a Mauritian racewalker. She competed in the women's 20 kilometres walk at the 2004 Summer Olympics.
