= Costică Bălan =

Romanian racewalker

Constantin ("Costică") Bălan (born August 25, 1964 in Băcani, Vaslui) is a retired male racewalker from Romania. He twice competed for his native country in the men's 20 km race walk event at the Summer Olympics: 1996 and 2000.

== Achievements ==
Year	Competition	Venue	Position	Event	Notes
Representing Romania
1993	World Championships	Stuttgart, Germany	—	20 km	DSQ
1995	World Championships	Gothenburg, Sweden	20th	20 km	1:26:53
1995	World Championships	Gothenburg, Sweden	—	50 km	DNF
1996	Olympic Games	Atlanta, United States	45th	20 km	1:29:36
1999	World Race Walking Cup	Mézidon-Canon, France	23rd	20 km	1:24:56
2000	European Race Walking Cup	Eisenhüttenstadt, Germany	12th	20 km	1:21:43
2000	Olympic Games	Sydney, Australia	18th	20 km	1:23:42
2003	European Race Walking Cup	Cheboksary, Russia	22nd	20 km	1:24:56
