= Larisa Ramazanova =

Belarusian racewalker

Personal information
- Born: September 23, 1971 (age 55) Saransk, Respublika Mordoviya, Soviet Union

Sport
- Sport: Race walking
Medal record
Representing Russia
Summer Universiade
| Bronze medal – third place | 1993 Buffalo | 10km walk |
| Bronze medal – third place | 1995 Fukuoka | 10km walk |
Representing Belarus
Summer Universiade
| Gold medal – first place | 1997 Catania | 10km walk |

Larisa Khmelnitskaya (Belarusian: Ларыса Хмяльніцкая, née Ramazanova; born September 23, 1971) is a retired female race walker who competed for Russia and Belarus.

== International competitions ==
| Year | Competition | Venue | Position | Event | Result | Notes |
Representing Russia
| 1994 | European Championships | Helsinki, Finland | 5th | 10 km | 43:25 | |
| 1995 | World Championships | Gothenburg, Sweden | 5th | 10 km | 42:25 | |
Representing Belarus
| 1997 | World Race Walking Cup | Poděbrady, Czech Republic | 7th | 10 km | 42:46 | |
| 1997 | World Championships | Athens, Greece | — | 10,000 m | DNF | |
| 1997 | World Student Games | Catania, Italy | 1st | 10 km | 44:01 | |
| 1999 | World Race Walking Cup | Mézidon-Canon, France | 27th | 20 km | 1:33:55 | |
| 1999 | World Championships | Seville, Spain | — | 20 km | DNF | |
| 2000 | Olympic Games | Sydney, Australia | 32nd | 20 km | 1:37:39 | |
| 2002 | World Race Walking Cup | Turin, Italy | 22nd | 20 km | 1:35:17 | |
| 2004 | World Race Walking Cup | Naumburg, Germany | 23rd | 20 km | 1:30:39 | |
