= Christina Kokotou =

Greek race walker (born 1972)

Christina Kokotou (Greek: Χριστίνα Κοκότου; born 9 January 1972) is a Greek race walker. She competed in two Olympic Games, three World Championships and became Greek champion six times.

== Career ==
Born in Agrinio, she represented the club Panellinios GS. She finished sixth at the 1997 Mediterranean Games, competed at the 1997 World Championships without reaching the final, and finished lowly at the 1997 IAAF World Race Walking Cup. She set her first Greek record in the 10 kilometre walk at the 1998 European Race Walking Cup in Dudince. Her 47:15 minutes improved Popi Gavalaki's record from 1990 by one second. Kokotou finished 37th at the event.

The next year she finished 56th at the 1999 IAAF World Race Walking Cup and 37th at the 1999 World Championships, followed by a 36th place at the 2000 Olympic Games. In 2001–2002 she did not finish either of her races; the 2001 World Championships, the 2001 European Race Walking Cup, the 2001 Mediterranean Games, or the 2002 IAAF World Race Walking Cup. Having been Greek champion every year from 1994 through 1998, Kokotou now also found herself behind Christina Deskou, who took over as Greek champion in 1999 and set Greek records. At the Greek championships of 2002, Kokotou finished second behind Athanasia Tsoumeleka.

In 2003 Kokotou finished 24th at the 2003 European Race Walking Cup. She entered the 2003 Dutch and Belgian race walking championship in Tilburg. She won the race, but more importantly she finished in 1:29:54 hours, thereby meeting the qualification standard for the 2004 Olympic Games held in her homecountry Greece. This was also her lifetime best time over the 20 kilometres. She proceeded to achieve a career best placement at the World Race Walking Cup in 2004, finishing 17th, followed by a 31st place at the 2004 Olympic Games.

Injury kept her out of the national team in 2005. She did not compete internationally after 2004. Her personal best time in the 10 kilometres walk was 44:58 minutes, achieved in April 2004 in Agios Kosmas.
