= Jacob Sørensen (race walker) =

Danish race walker (born 1974)

Jacob Sørensen (born 27 December 1974) is a Danish race walker who specialized in the 50 kilometres distance. He competed at three World Championships and two European Championships.

== Career ==
He came up in the club MK Nørrevang in Randers, together with Claus Jørgensen; they were coached by Kaj Thomsen. They both later switched clubs to Sønder Omme IF.

He finished thirteenth at the 1993 European Junior Championships. Having finished lowly at the 1993 and 1997 IAAF World Race Walking Cups, he finished 26th at the 1998 European Race Walking Cup and 23rd at the 1998 European Championships. Following a 56th place at the 1999 IAAF World Race Walking Cup, he was disqualified at the 1999 World Championships.

In 2000 he recorded his first sub-4 hour race of 3:58:09 hours, finishing 16th at the 2000 European Race Walking Cup in Eisenhüttenstadt. A 33rd place from the 2001 European Race Walking Cup was improved to a 22nd place at the 2001 World Championships, but he was then disqualified again at the 2002 European Championships. Jyllands-Posten posed the question if Sørensen was the last Danish race walker on elite level.

His goal at the World Championships was to walk in a sub-4 hour time, which would qualify him for the 2004 Olympics. However, he had not been able to train with 250 kilometres a week, only 220–230. He was disqualified in the 50 kilometres event. According to Ritzau, he had been on track for a sub-4 hour time. He then did not finish the 2004 IAAF World Race Walking Cup, as well as failing to finish two events in Dudince and Dublin, and did not enter the Olympics. After that, Sørensen became Danish and Nordic champion, but his last major competition was the 2007 European Race Walking Cup where he finished 50th.

Jacob Sørensen still holds the Danish record in the 50 kilometres. All the other records, from 5000 metres track up to 30 kilometres road, are held by Claus Jørgensen.
