= Athletics at the 1998 Asian Games – Women's 10,000 metres walk =

Women's 10,000 metres walk at the 1998 Asian Games
- Venue: Thammasat Stadium
- Dates: 14 December 1998
- Competitors: 8 from 6 nations

Medalists
gold medal	Liu Hongyu	China
silver medal	Rie Mitsumori	Japan
bronze medal	Svetlana Tolstaya	Kazakhstan

The women's 10,000 metres walk competition at the 1998 Asian Games in Bangkok, Thailand was held on 14 December. This was the last time that this event was contested at the Asian Games later replaced by 20 kilometres walk.

== Schedule ==
All times are Indochina Time (UTC+07:00)

Date	Time	Event
Monday, 14 December 1998	08:30	Final

== Results ==
Legend

- DNF — Did not finish
- DSQ — Disqualified

Rank	Athlete	Time	Notes
1st place, gold medalist(s)	Liu Hongyu (CHN)	43:57.28	GR
2nd place, silver medalist(s)	Rie Mitsumori (JPN)	44:29.82	
3rd place, bronze medalist(s)	Svetlana Tolstaya (KAZ)	45:29.95	
4	Yuan Yufang (MAS)	45:33.92	
5	Thongju Piamsakul (THA)	53:14.64	
—	Tersiana Riwurohi (INA)	DNF	
—	Yuka Mitsumori (JPN)	DSQ	
—	Li Yuxin (CHN)	DSQ	
