= Artur Meliashkevich =

Belarusian racewalker

Personal information
- Born: April 11, 1975 (age 51)

Sport
- Sport: Race walking
Medal record
Representing Belarus
European U23 Championships
Bronze medal – third place	1997 Turku	20km walk
World Junior Championships
Bronze medal – third place	1994 Lisbon	10,000m walk

Artur Meliashkevich (Belarusian: Артур Меляшкевіч; born April 11, 1975) is a retired male race walker from Belarus. He set his personal best (1:18.12) in the men's 20 km event on March 10, 2001 in Brest, Belarus.

== Achievements ==
Year	Competition	Venue	Position	Event	Notes
Representing Belarus
1994	World Junior Championships	Lisbon, Portugal	3rd	10,000 m	40:35.52
1995	World Race Walking Cup	Beijing, PR China	44th	20 km	1:26:53
1997	World Race Walking Cup	Poděbrady, Czech Republic	8th	20 km	1:19:33
1997	European U23 Championships	Turku, Finland	3rd	20 km	1:22:26
1997	World Championships	Athens, Greece	20th	20 km	1:25:47
1998	European Championships	Budapest, Hungary	—	20 km	DSQ
1999	World Race Walking Cup	Mézidon-Canon, France	45th	20 km	1:28:57
2000	European Race Walking Cup	Eisenhüttenstadt, Germany	8th	20 km	1:20:53
2000	Olympic Games	Sydney, Australia	21st	20 km	1:24:50
2001	World Championships	Edmonton, Canada	—	20 km	DSQ
2002	World Race Walking Cup	Turin, Italy	10th	20 km	1:23:57

== See also ==
- Belarusian records in athletics
