= Victoria Palacios =

Mexican race walker (born 1977)

Personal information
- Born: March 29, 1977 (age 49) Hueyotlipan, Tlaxcala, Mexico

Sport
- Sport: Track and field
Medal record
Representing Mexico
Pan American Games
Gold medal – first place	2003 Santo Domingo	20km walk
Central American and Caribbean Games
Gold medal – first place	2002 San Salvador	20km walk

Victoria Palacios Carillo (born March 29, 1977) is a retired female race walker from Mexico. She competed at the 2004 Summer Olympics.

== Achievements ==
Year	Competition	Venue	Position	Event	Notes
Representing Mexico
1999	Central American and Caribbean Championships	Bridgetown, Barbados	3rd	10 km	57:41
2000	NACAC U-25 Championships	Monterrey, Mexico	1st	20,000m walk	1:39:01.14
2001	World Championships	Edmonton, Canada	10th	20 km	1:33:52
2002	Central American and Caribbean Games	San Salvador, El Salvador	1st	20 km	1:36:16
2003	Pan American Games	Santo Domingo, Dominican Republic	1st	20 km	1:35:16
2004	Olympic Games	Athens, Greece	34th	20 km	1:36:07
