= Hubert Sonnek =

Czech race walker

Hubert Sonnek (born 11 February 1962) is a retired Czech race walker. Born in Strahovice, he represented the club PSK Olymp Praha.

Sonnek finished 18th at the 1991 World Championships (50 km), ninth at the 1994 European Championships (20 km), 21st at the 1995 World Championships (20 km) and 32nd at the 1996 Olympic Games (20 km). He also competed at the IAAF World Race Walking Cup in 1997 and 1999 in the 20 kilometres race. He became Czechoslovak champion in 1989 (50 km), and Czech champion seven times.
