= Mikhail Khmelnitskiy =

Belarusian race walker

Personal information
- Born: 24 July 1969 (age 57) Minsk Oblast, Soviet Union

Sport
- Sport: Race walking
Medal record
Representing Belarus
World Championships
Bronze medal – third place	1997 Athens	20km walk

Mikhail Khmelnitskiy (Belarusian: Міхаіл Хмяльніцкі; born 24 July 1969) is a race walker who represented the Soviet Union and later Belarus.

== Achievements ==
Year	Competition	Venue	Position	Event	Notes
Representing the Soviet Union
1988	World Junior Championships	Sudbury, Canada	3rd	10,000 m	41:38.86
Representing Belarus
1994	European Championships	Helsinki, Finland	—	20 km	DQ
1995	World Championships	Gothenburg, Sweden	9th	20 km	1:23:24
1996	Olympic Games	Atlanta, United States	12th	20 km	1:22:17
1997	World Championships	Athens, Greece	3rd	20 km	1:22:01
1999	World Race Walking Cup	Mézidon-Canon, France	6th	20 km	1:21:32
2000	Olympic Games	Sydney, Australia	34th	20 km	1:28:02
