= Lisa Sheridan-Paolini =

Australian racewalker

Personal information
- Nationality: Australian
- Born: 10 December 1962 (age 63)

Sport
- Sport: Athletics
- Event: Racewalking

Lisa Sheridan-Paolini (born 10 December 1962) is an Australian racewalker. She competed in the women's 20 kilometres walk at the 2000 Summer Olympics.
