= Zuzana Blažeková =

Slovak racewalker

Personal information
- Nationality: Slovak
- Born: 1 July 1980 (age 46)

Sport
- Sport: Athletics
- Event: Racewalking

Zuzana Blažeková (born 1 July 1980) is a Slovak racewalker. She competed in the women's 20 kilometres walk at the 2000 Summer Olympics.
