= Maya Sazonova =

Kazakhstani racewalker

Maya Fyodorovna Sozonova (Russian: Майя Фёдоровна Созонова; born May 28, 1965, in Almaty) is a retired female race walker from Kazakhstan. She competed for Kazakhstan in the 1996 and 2000 Summer Olympics.

== Achievements ==
Year	Competition	Venue	Position	Event	Notes
Representing Kazakhstan
1995	World Championships	Gothenburg, Sweden	28th	10 km	45:13
1996	Olympic Games	Atlanta, United States	35th	10 km	47:33
1997	World Championships	Athens, Greece	—	10 km	DSQ
1999	World Race Walking Cup	Mézidon-Canon, France	22nd	10 km	1:32:29
1999	World Championships	Seville, Spain	8th	20 km	1:32:19
2000	Olympic Games	Sydney, Australia	—	20 km	DNF
2001	East Asian Games	Osaka, Japan	2nd	20 km	1:32:31
2001	World Championships	Edmonton, Canada	—	20 km	DSQ
2002	World Race Walking Cup	Turin, Italy	32nd	10 km	1:36:35
