= Rishat Shafikov =

Russian race walker

Rishat Rimzovich Shafikov (Russian: Ришат Римзович Шафиков; born 23 January 1970) is a retired Russian race walker.

He was born in Chelyabinsk. He won a bronze medal at the 1989 European Junior Championships. His best senior competition was at the 1996 Olympic Games, when he finished fifth in the 20 km race. He also finished seventh at the 1997 World Race Walking Cup, and placed lowly at the 1995 World Race Walking Cup (105th) and the 1999 World Race Walking Cup (68th).
