= Yu Guohui =

Chinese racewalker

Yu Guohui (simplified Chinese: 于国辉; traditional Chinese: 於國輝; pinyin: Yú Guóhuī; born April 30, 1977, in Qingdao) is a retired male Chinese race walker.

== Achievements ==
Year	Competition	Venue	Position	Event	Notes
Representing China
1996	Olympic Games	Atlanta, Georgia	21st	20 km	
1997	World Championships	Athens, Greece	4th	20 km	
1998	Asian Games	Bangkok, Thailand	1st	20 km	1:20:25 CR
1999	World Race Walking Cup	Mézidon-Canon, France	2nd	20 km	
1999	World Championships	Seville, Spain	14th	20 km	
2000	Olympic Games	Sydney, Australia	13th	20 km	
