= Dmitry Yesipchuk =

Russian racewalker

Personal information
- Born: 17 November 1974 (age 51) Chelyabinsk, Soviet Union

Sport
- Sport: Race walking

Dmitriy Yesipchuk (born 17 November 1974) is a race walker from Russia. He set the world's best-of-the-year performance in the men's 20-km walk in 2001, clocking 1:18:05 in Adler, Russia.

== International competitions ==
Year	Competition	Venue	Position	Event	Notes
Representing the Commonwealth of Independent States
1992	World Junior Championships	Seoul, South Korea	5th	10,000 m	41:34.25
Representing Russia
1993	European Junior Championships	San Sebastián, Spain	2nd	10,000 m	40:26.08
1995	World Championships	Gothenburg, Sweden	—	20 km	DNF
1999	World Race Walking Cup	Mézidon-Canon, France	9th	20 km	1:21:54
2000	European Race Walking Cup	Eisenhüttenstadt, Germany	5th	20 km	1:19:56
2001	European Race Walking Cup	Dudince, Slovakia	11th	20 km	1:22:05
2006	World Race Walking Cup	A Coruña, Spain	22nd	20 km	1:22:48
