= Denis Trautmann =

German racewalker

Denis Trautmann (born 15 August 1972) is a retired German race walker.

== Achievements ==
Year	Competition	Venue	Position	Event	Notes
Representing Germany
1998	European Championships	Budapest, Hungary	8th	50 km	
1999	World Race Walking Cup	Mézidon-Canon, France	12th	50 km	
1999	World Championships	Seville, Spain	—	50 km	DSQ
2000	European Race Walking Cup	Eisenhüttenstadt, Germany	7th	50 km	3:50:28
2000	Olympic Games	Sydney, Australia	21st	50 km	
2001	European Race Walking Cup	Dudince, Slovakia	10th	50 km	3:52:16
2001	World Championships	Edmonton, Canada	—	50 km	DSQ
