= Erica Alfridi =

Italian race walker (born 1968)

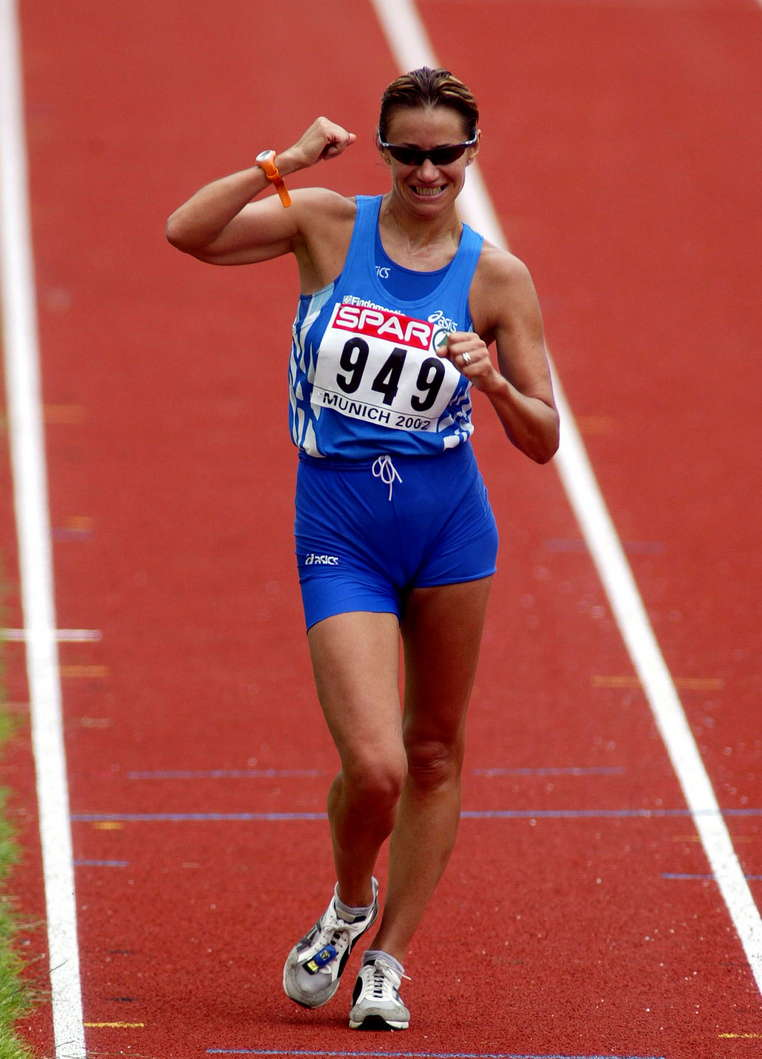
- Alfridi at Munich 2002

Personal information
- National team: Italy: 29 caps (1988-2004)
- Born: 2 February 1968 (age 58) Tregnago, Italy
- Height: 1.68 m (5 ft 6 in)
- Weight: 52 kg (115 lb)

Sport
- Sport: Athletics
- Event: 20 km walk
- Club: Snam Gas Metano
- Coached by: Sandro Damilano
- Retired: 2004

Achievements and titles
- Personal bests: 10 km: 42:15 (1997); 20 km: 1:27:29 (2001)
Medal record
Individual
Event	1st	2nd	3rd
European Championships	0	1	1
World Race Walking Cup	1	0	0
Mediterranean Games	1	0	0
Total	2	1	1
Team
Event	1st	2nd	3rd
World Race Walking Cup	1	2	1
European Race Walking Cup	2	2	0
Total	3	4	1

Erica Alfridi (born 22 February 1968) is a former Italian race walker, who has won an individual senior level World Race Walking Cup.

== Biography ==
Erica Alfridi won three medals, at individual level, at the International athletics competitions. She participated at one edition of the Summer Olympics (2000). She has 29 caps in sixteen years (from 1988 to 2004) with the national team.

== Progression ==
She finished the season 10 times in world top 20, in 1997 she was World Leader in the 10 km walk.

10 km walk

Year	Time	Venue	Date	World Rank
2002	43:05	(Italy) Piacenza	30 JUN	5th
2001	43:23	(Italy) Sesto San Giovanni	01 MAY	5th
2000	43:09	(Italy) Vittorio Veneto	16 JUL	2nd
1998	42:54	(Hungary) Budapest	20 AUG	13th
1997	42:15	(Germany) Naumburg	25 MAY	12th
1996	43:27	(Russia) Moscow	02 JUN	58th
1995	43:54	(France) Fougères	11 JUN	
1989	44:34	(Germany) Naumburg	01 MAY	18th

20 km walk

Year	Time	Venue	Date	World Rank
2004	1:33:19	(Mexico) Tijuana	20 MAR	
2002	1:28:33	(Germany) Munich	07 AUG	8th
2001	1:27:29	(Slovakia) Dudince	19 MAY	7th
2000	1:28:06	(Germany) Eisenhüttenstadt	17 JUN	10th
1999	1:31:52	(Italy) Campobasso	13 MAR	
1997	1:28:13	(Italy) Cassino	09 MAR	1st
1996	1:32:53	(Italy) Abano Terme	06 OCT	

== Achievements ==
Year	Competition	Venue	Position	Notes
1997	World Championships	Athens, Greece	5th	10 km
1997	World Race Walking Cup	Poděbrady, Czech Republic	4th	10 km
1998	European Championships	Budapest, Hungary	2nd	10 km
1999	World Championships	Seville, Spain	6th	20 km
2000	European Race Walking Cup	Eisenhüttenstadt, Germany	4th	20 km
2000	Olympic Games	Sydney, Australia	4th	20 km
2001	European Race Walking Cup	Dudince, Slovakia	4th	20 km
2001	Mediterranean Games	Radès, Tunisia	1st	20 km
2001	World Championships	Edmonton, Canada	4th	20 km
2002	European Championships	Munich, Germany	3rd	20 km
2002	World Race Walking Cup	Turin, Italy	1st	20 km

== National titles ==
She won 11 times the individual national championship.

- 2 wins in the 5000 walk track (1998, 2002)
- 2 wins in the 10 km walk (1988, 1997)
- 3 wins in the 20 km walk (1996, 1997, 1999)
- 4 wins in the 3000 metres walk indoor (1996, 1997, 1999, 2000)

== See also ==
- Italy at the World Athletics Race Walking Team Championships - Multiple medalists
- Italy at the European Race Walking Cup - Multiple medalists
- Italian all-time lists - 20 km walk
