= Andrey Makarov (race walker) =

Russian-born retired male race walker (born 1971)

Personal information
- Born: January 2, 1971 (age 55) Irkutsk, Soviet Union

Sport
- Sport: Race walking

Andrey Anatolyevich Makarov (Belarusian: Андрэй Анатолевіч Макараў; born January 2, 1971) is a Russian-born retired male race walker who competed internationally for Belarus after obtaining citizenship in 1998. He set his personal best (1:18.23) in the men's 20 km event on May 13, 2000 in Soligorsk.

== Achievements ==
Year	Competition	Venue	Position	Event	Notes
Representing Russia
1997	World Race Walking Cup	Poděbrady, Czech Republic	11th	20 km	1:19:54
Representing Belarus
1998	European Championships	Budapest, Hungary	—	20 km	DSQ
1999	World Race Walking Cup	Mézidon-Canon, France	11th	—	DNF
2000	European Race Walking Cup	Eisenhüttenstadt, Germany	—	20 km	DSQ
2000	Olympic Games	Sydney, Australia	17th	20 km	1:23:33
2002	European Championships	Munich, Germany	—	20 km	DSQ
2004	World Race Walking Cup	Naumburg, Germany	11th	—	DNF
