= Claudia Ștef =

Romanian racewalker

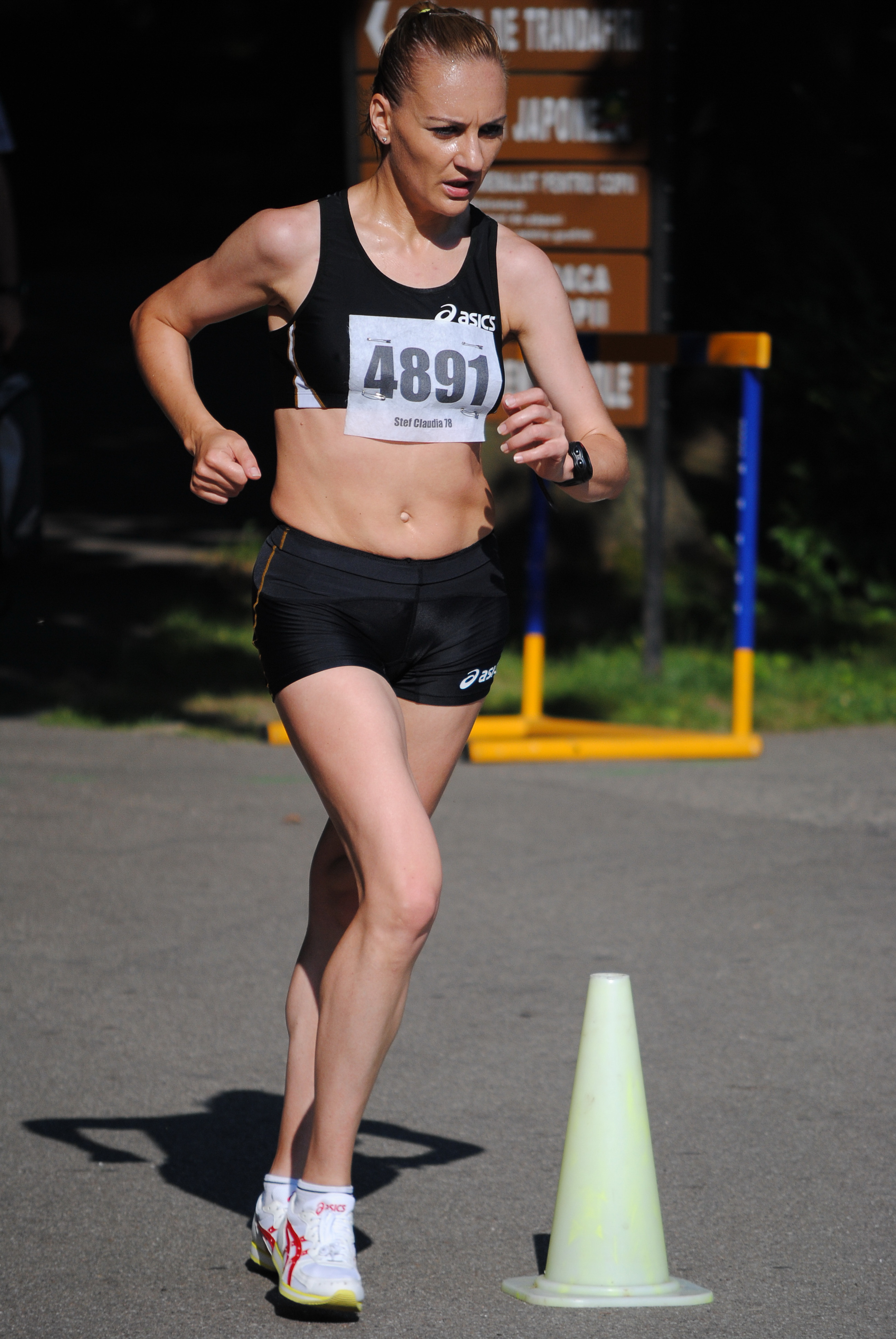
- Claudia Ștef during Romanian National Race-Walking Championship 20km, on 24 June 2011

Personal information
- Born: 25 February 1978 (age 48) Craiova, Romania
- Height: 1.7 m (5 ft 7 in)
- Weight: 55 kg (121 lb)

Sport
- Country: Romania
- Sport: Athletics
- Event: 20km Race Walk
Medal record
Representing Romania
Summer Universiade
Gold medal – first place	1999 Palma de Mallorca	10km walk
European U23 Championships
Gold medal – first place	1999 Gothenburg	20km walk
European Junior Championships
Gold medal – first place	1997 Ljubljana	5000m walk

Claudia Ștef, née Iovan (born 25 February 1978) is a Romanian women's professional race walker.

Ștef holds the world indoor record for 3000 metres track walk with 11:40.33 minutes, achieved in January 1999 in Bucharest.

== Doping ==
She tested positive for nandrolone in an out-of-competition test on 20 May 2000 and received a two-year doping ban.

== Achievements ==
Year	Competition	Venue	Position	Event	Notes
Representing Romania
1996	World Junior Championships	Sydney, Australia	3rd	5000 m	21:57.11
1997	World Race Walking Cup	Poděbrady, Czech Republic	34th	10 km	45:03
1997	European Junior Championships	Ljubljana, Slovenia	1st	5000 m	21:15.99
1998	European Race Walking Cup	Dudince, Slovakia	3rd	10 km	43:12
1998	European Championships	Budapest, Hungary	12th	10 km	44:10
1999	World Race Walking Cup	Mézidon-Canon, France	6th	20 km	1:29:39
1999	European U23 Championships	Gothenburg, Sweden	1st	20 km	1:33:17
1999	World Championships	Seville, Spain	11th	20 km	1:33:46
1999	Universiade	Palma, Spain	1st	10 km	44:22
2002	World Race Walking Cup	Turin, Italy	6th	20 km	1:30:05
2002	European Championships	Munich, Germany	5th	20 km	1:29:57
2003	World Championships	Paris, France	5th	20 km	1:29:09
2004	World Race Walking Cup	Naumburg, Germany	12th	20 km	1:29:40
2005	World Championships	Helsinki, Finland	8th	20 km	1:30:07
2006	World Race Walking Cup	A Coruña, Spain	11th	20 km	1:29:46
2006	European Championships	Gothenburg, Sweden	5th	20 km	1:29:27
2007	World Championships	Osaka, Japan	6th	20 km	1:32:47
2008	World Race Walking Cup	Cheboksary, Russia	21st	20 km	1:33:19
2009	European Race Walking Cup	Metz, France	15th	20 km	1:39:10
2009	World Championships	Berlin, Germany	23rd	20 km	1:36:09
2011	European Race Walking Cup	Olhão, Portugal	—	20 km	DQ
2011	World Championships	Daegu, South Korea	26th	20 km	1:36:55
2012	World Race Walking Cup	Saransk, Russia	12th	20 km	1:32:15
2012	Olympic Games	London, United Kingdom	38th	20 km	1:33:56
2015	European Race Walking Cup	Murcia, Spain	26th	20 km	1:34:31
2015	European Race Walking Cup	Murcia, Spain	7th	Team - 20 km	95 pts
2015	World Championships	Beijing, China	24th	20 km	1:34:51

== See also ==
- List of doping cases in athletics
