= Rocío Florido =

Spanish athlete

Personal information
- Nationality: Spanish
- Born: 16 January 1976 (age 50) Málaga, Spain

Sport
- Sport: Athletics
- Event: Racewalking
Medal record
Representing Spain
Mediterranean Games
Bronze medal – third place	2001 Tunis	20km walk

Rocío Florido Florido (born 16 January 1976) is a Spanish racewalker. She competed in the women's 20 kilometres walk at the 2004 Summer Olympics.
