= Natalya Fedoskina =

Russian race walker

Natalya Fedoskina (born 15 June 1980) is a Russian race walker.

== Achievements ==
Year	Competition	Venue	Position	Notes
Representing Russia
1999	World Race Walking Cup	Mézidon-Canon, France	2nd	10 km
1999	World Championships	Seville, Spain	DSQ	20 km
2001	European Race Walking Cup	Dudince, Slovakia	2nd	20 km
2001	World Championships	Edmonton, Canada	DSQ	20 km
2002	European Championships	Munich, Germany	DNF	20 km
2002	World Race Walking Cup	Turin, Italy	3rd	10 km
2003	World Championships	Paris, France	DSQ	20 km
