= Fernando Vázquez (race walker) =

Spanish racewalker

Personal information
- Nationality: Spanish
- Born: 4 May 1971 (age 55)

Sport
- Sport: Athletics
- Event: Racewalking

Fernando Vázquez (born 4 May 1971) is a Spanish racewalker. He competed in the men's 20 kilometres walk at the 1996 Summer Olympics.
