= Liu Hongyu =

Chinese race walker

- Simplified Chinese: 刘宏宇
- Traditional Chinese: 劉宏宇
Transcriptions
Standard Mandarin
- Hanyu Pinyin: Liú Hóngyǔ
Yue: Cantonese
- Yale Romanization: Làuh Wàhng Yúh
- Jyutping: Lau⁴ Wang⁴ Jyu⁵

Liu Hongyu (Chinese: 刘宏宇) born January 11, 1975, in Liaoning) is a female Chinese race walker.

== Achievements ==
Year	Competition	Venue	Position	Event	Notes
Representing China
1993	World Race Walking Cup	Monterrey, Mexico	18th	10 km	47:56
1993	World Championships	Stuttgart, Germany	—	10 km	DSQ
1994	World Junior Championships	Lisbon, Portugal	8th	5000 m	22:23.69
1995	World Championships	Gothenburg, Sweden	8th	10 km	42:46
1995	World Race Walking Cup	Beijing, China	3rd	10 km	42:49
1997	World Championships	Athens, Greece	4th	10,000 m	43:56.86
1997	World Race Walking Cup	Poděbrady, Czech Republic	12th	10 km	42:57
1998	Asian Games	Bangkok, Thailand	1st	10,000 m	43:57.28
1999	World Championships	Seville, Spain	1st	20 km	1:30:50
1999	World Race Walking Cup	Mézidon-Canon, France	1st	20 km	1:27:32
2000	Olympic Games	Sydney, Australia	—	20 km	DSQ
2001	East Asian Games	Osaka, Japan	1st	20 km	1:32:06
2001	World Championships	Edmonton, Canada	—	20 km	DSQ

== See also ==
- China at the World Championships in Athletics

Records
Preceded by (Australia) Kerry Saxby	Women's 20 km Walk World Record Holder equalled by (Russia) Nadezhda Ryashkina on 1999-02-07; May 1, 1995 – November 19, 2001	Succeeded by (China) Wang Yan
