= Yuliya Voyevodina =

Russian race walker (1971–2022)

Yuliya Sergeyevna Voyevodina

Personal information
- Nationality: Russian
- Died: May 4, 2022 (aged 50) Penza, Russia

Sport
- Sport: Athletics
- Rank: Race walking

Yuliya Sergeyevna Voyevodina (Russian: Юлия Серге́евна Воеводина; 17 October 1971 – 4 May 2022) was a Russian race walker. She was born in Kuznetsk, Penza Oblast.

She was married to Aleksey Voyevodin.

Voyevodina died on 4 May 2022, at the age of 50.

== Achievements ==
Year	Competition	Venue	Position	Notes
Representing Russia
2004	World Race Walking Cup	Naumburg, Germany	7th	20 km
2004	Olympic Games	Athens, Greece	13th	20 km
2005	World Championships	Helsinki, Finland	10th	20 km
