= Fatiha Ouali =

French racewalker (born 1974)

Personal information
- Nationality: French
- Born: 28 October 1974 (age 50) Roubaix
- Years active: 2000s
- Height: 1.59 m (5 ft 3 in)

Sport
- Event: race walking
- Club: CM Roubaix

Fatiha Ouali (born 28 October 1974) is a female race walker from France. She was born in Roubaix, Nord.

== Biography ==
Ouali won eleven French national walking titles, seven on the road. She held the record of France on track for the 5000m walk (21:51.70) and of the 10000m walk (44:58.60), set in 2001, and that of the 3000m Indoors walk (12:40.44, 2002).

=== Prize list ===
- French Athletic Championships :
  - 10 km walk : winner in 2000, 2001, 2002, 2003 and 2005
  - 20 km walk : winner in 2000 and 2002
- French Indoor Athletic Championships :
  - 3,000m walk : winner in 2000, 2002, 2003 and 2005

=== Records ===
Records personnels
Event	Performance	Location	Date
20 km walk	1:32.14	Royal Leamington Spa	23 April 2000

== Achievements ==
Year	Competition	Venue	Position	Event	Notes
Representing France
1999	World Championships	Seville, Spain	23rd	20 km	
2000	European Race Walking Cup	Eisenhüttenstadt, Germany	—	20 km	DNF
2000	Olympic Games	Sydney, Australia	23rd	20 km	
2001	World Championships	Edmonton, Canada	23rd	20 km	
2003	World Championships	Paris, France	19th	20 km	
