= Viktoras Meškauskas =

Lithuanian racewalker (born 1970)

Personal information
- Nationality: Lithuanian
- Born: 4 November 1970 (age 55)

Sport
- Sport: Athletics
- Event: Racewalking

Viktoras Meškauskas (born 4 November 1970) is a Lithuanian racewalker. He competed in the men's 20 kilometres walk at the 1992 Summer Olympics.
