= Jaroslav Makovec =

Czech racewalker

Jaroslav Makovec (born 11 January 1960) is a retired Czech race walker.

He finished 20th at the 1991 World Championships, in Tokyo, Japan (50 km) and 40th at the 1997 World Race Walking Cup (50 km) in Poděbrady, Czech Republic. He became Czech champion in 1998 (50 km).
