= Nadezhda Ryashkina =

Russian racewalker

Nadezhda Ryashkina (Russian: Надежда Ряшкина; born January 22, 1967, in Sokol, Vologda Oblast) is a retired female race walker from Russia. She set the world record in the women's 10 km race walk event on July 25, 1990, clocking 41:56.23, in Seattle at the 1990 Goodwill Games. Ryashkina equalled Liu Hongyu's world record in the 20 km event with a total time of 1:27:30, set on February 7, 1999, in Adler, Russia.

== International competitions ==
Year	Competition	Venue	Position	Event	Result	Notes
Representing Soviet Union
1990	Goodwill Games	Seattle, United States	1st	10,000 m	41:56.23	WR
1991	World Race Walking Cup	San Jose, United States	8th	10 km	45:19	
Representing Russia
1998	European Race Walking Cup	Dudince, Slovakia	1st	10 km	43:06	
1998	European Championships	Budapest, Hungary	7th	10 km	43:37	
2000	European Race Walking Cup	Eisenhüttenstadt, Germany	—	20 km	DNF	
2002	World Race Walking Cup	Turin, Italy	11th	20 km	1:32:27	
