= Eva Pérez =

Spanish racewalker

Personal information
- Nationality: Spanish
- Born: 18 July 1975 (age 51) Barcelona, Spain

Sport
- Sport: Athletics
- Event: Racewalking

Eva Pérez Trujillo (born 18 July 1975) is a Spanish racewalker. She competed in the women's 20 kilometres walk at the 2000 Summer Olympics.
