= Yeliz Ay =

Turkish racewalker

Personal information
- Nationality: Turkey
- Born: 9 November 1977 (age 48) Ankara, Turkey

Sport
- Sport: Race walker

Achievements and titles
- Personal bests: 10000m walk: 46:52.1; 10km walk: 46:12; 20km walk: 1:34:57

Yeliz Ay (born 9 November 1977 in Ankara, Turkey) is a Turkish female racewalker. She studied at Süleyman Demirel University.

She was the winner of the 5th Royal Leamington Spa EAA Race Walking Grand Prix in 2004, clocking 1:43.15. Ay was named the competition's best technical walker as well.

She is the holder of the national records in 5000m walk (track), 10000m walk (track), 20000m walk (track), 10 km walk (road) and 20 km walk (road).

== Personal bests ==
According to IAAF database, her personal bests are:

- 10000m walk: 46:52.1 - Ankara (TUR), 06.02.2005
- 10 km walk: 46:12 - Dublin (IRE), 27.06.2004
- 20 km walk: 1:34:57 - Minsk (BLR), 08.07.2004
