= Tatyana Gudkova =

Russian race walker

Tatyana Gudkova (Russian: Татьяна Гудкова; born 23 December 1978) is a Russian race walker.

== International competitions ==
Representing Russia
Year	Competition	Venue	Position	Event	Result	Notes
2000	Olympic Games	Sydney, Australia	8th	20 km		
2003	World Championships	Paris, France	4th	20 km		
2005	World Championships	Helsinki, Finland	18th	20 km		
