= Mara Ibañez =

Mexican racewalker

Personal information
- Nationality: Mexican
- Born: 17 December 1974 (age 51) Xalapa, Mexico

Sport
- Sport: Athletics
- Event: Racewalking

Mara Ibañez López (born 17 December 1974) is a Mexican racewalker. She competed in the women's 20 kilometres walk at the 2000 Summer Olympics.
