= Olga Polyakova (athlete) =

Russian racewalker

Personal information
- Nationality: Russian
- Born: 23 September 1980 (age 46) Zarechny, Penza Oblast, Soviet Union

Sport
- Sport: Athletics
- Event: Racewalking

Olga Polyakova (born 23 September 1980) is a Russian racewalker. She competed in the women's 20 kilometres walk at the 2000 Summer Olympics.
