= Wang Liping (race walker) =

Chinese Olympic race walker (born 1976)

Medal record

Women's athletics

Representing China

Olympic Games
Gold medal – first place	2000 Sydney	20 km walk

Asian Athletics Championships
Silver medal – second place	1995 Jakarta	10 km walk

East Asian Games
Gold medal – first place	2005 Macao	20 km walk

Summer Universiade
Bronze medal – third place	2001 Beijing	10 km walk

Wang Liping (simplified Chinese: 王丽萍; traditional Chinese: 王麗萍; pinyin: Wáng Lìpíng; born July 8, 1976, in Fengcheng, Liaoning) is a Chinese race walker who became an Olympic champion by winning the 20 kilometre walk event in the 2000 Summer Olympics.

== Career ==
Wang was an international competitor in the women's 20 km race walk during the late 1990s and early 2000s. In the 2000 Summer Olympics in Sydney she made her greatest achievement when she won the gold medal. Four years later in Athens she finished eighth in the 20 kilometre walk race.

Wang participated in the 2005 World Championships in Helsinki where she finished in the 8th place. This was her last major competition. Her personal best time is 1:26:23 hours.

=== China's loneliest Olympic champion ===
Wang became known as "China's loneliest Olympic champion". The nickname's origin comes from her personal story of winning the Olympic gold medal. Following the disqualification of China's favored athlete, most of the Chinese coaching staff left the stadium, leaving Wang celebrating her unexpected win alone, walking a full lap without cheers or even the national flag.

== Achievements ==
- Gold Medal - Women's 20 km race walk, 2000 Summer Olympics.
