= Valentyna Savchuk =

Ukrainian racewalker

Personal information
- Born: 19 January 1975 (age 51)

Sport
- Sport: Race walking
Medal record
Representing Ukraine
Summer Universiade
Bronze medal – third place	1999 Palma de Mallorca	10km walk

Valentyna Savchuk (Ukrainian: Валентина Савчук; born 19 January 1975) is a female race walker from Ukraine.

== Achievements ==
Year	Competition	Venue	Position	Event	Notes
Representing Ukraine
1999	Universiade	Palma de Mallorca, Spain	3rd	10 km	45:23
1999	World Championships	Seville, Spain	—	20 km	DNF
2000	European Race Walking Cup	Eisenhüttenstadt, Germany	7th	20 km	1:29:16
2000	Olympic Games	Sydney, Australia	12th	20 km	
2001	European Race Walking Cup	Dudince, Slovakia	12th	20 km	1:31:48
