= Mézidon-Canon =

- Part of Mézidon Vallée d'Auge
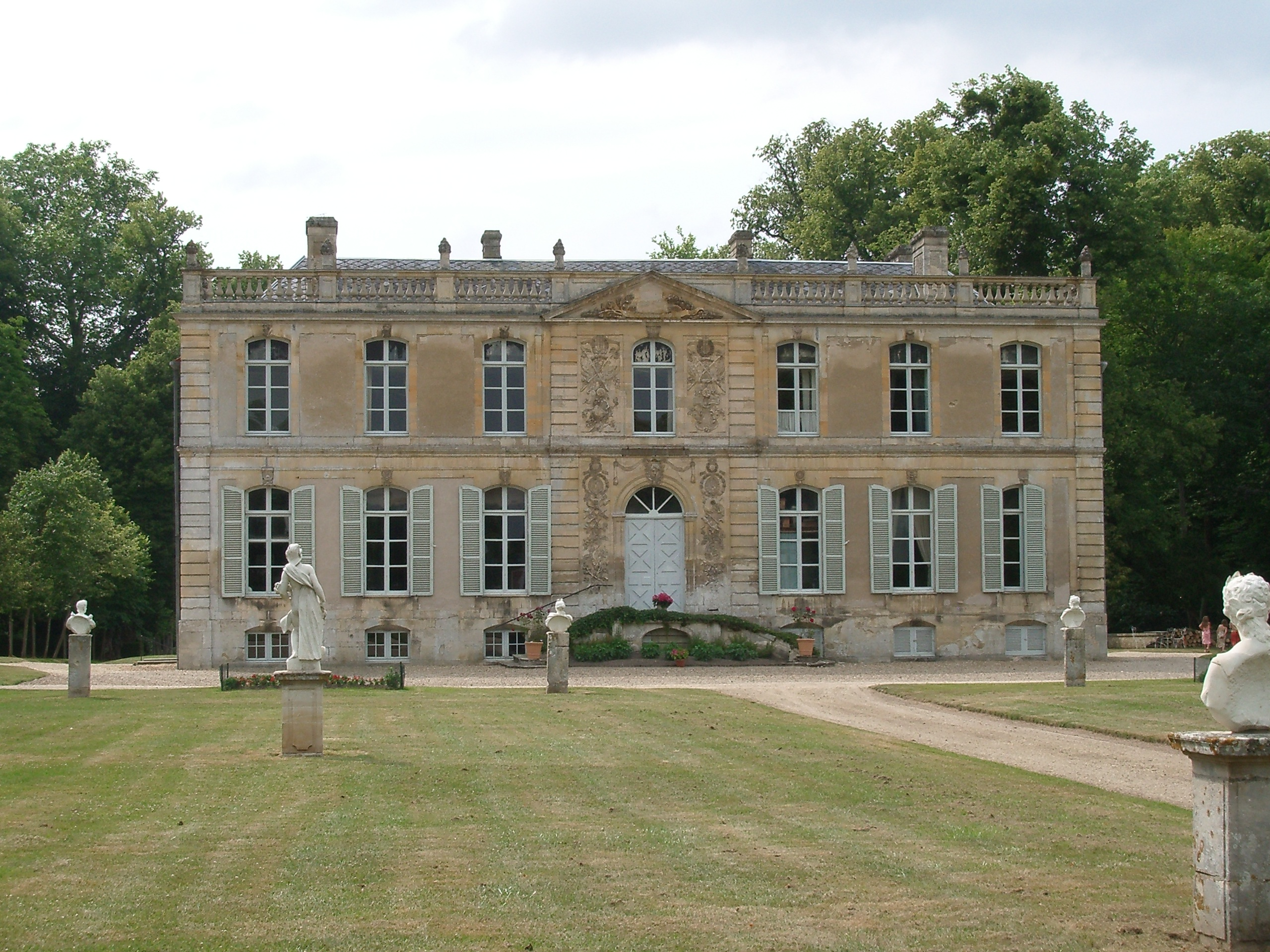
- Chateau of Canon

- Coat of arms
- Location of Mézidon-Canon
- Location within France Location within Normandy
- Coordinates: 49°04′25″N 0°04′12″W
- Country: France
- Region: Normandy
- Department: Calvados
- Arrondissement: Lisieux
- Canton: Mézidon Vallée d'Auge
- Commune: Mézidon Vallée d'Auge
- Area^{1}: 10.92 km^{2} (4.22 sq mi)
- Elevation: 20 m (66 ft)
- Highest elevation: 72 m (236 ft)
- Lowest elevation: 9 m (30 ft)
- Population (2022): 4,683
  - Density: 428.8/km^{2} (1,111/sq mi)
- Time zone: UTC+01:00 (CET)
  - Summer (DST): UTC+02:00 (CEST)
- Postal code: 14270
- ^{1} French Land Register data, which excludes lakes, ponds, glaciers > 1 km^{2} (0.386 sq mi or 247 acres) and river estuaries.

Mézidon-Canon (French pronunciation: [mezidɔ̃ kanɔ̃]) is a former commune in the Calvados department in the Normandy region in northwestern France. On 9 September 1972, Mézidon merged with Canon to create Mézidon-Canon. On 1 January 2017, it was merged into the new commune Mézidon Vallée d'Auge.

Canon was the site of a fortress built in 1050 by Odo (Eudes) Stigand for William the Bastard, duke of Normandy, Odo was the first baron of Mézidon and founder of the priory of St. Barbara, known as Sainte-Barbe-en-Auge.

== Population ==
Historical population
Year	Pop.	±% p.a.
1975	4,123	—
1982	4,571	+1.48%
1990	4,622	+0.14%
1999	4,713	+0.22%
2022	4,683	−0.03%
Source: EHESS and INSEE

== See also ==
- Communes of the Calvados department
- Château de Canon
