= Emblems of the Autonomous Soviet Republics =

The emblems of the autonomous republics of the Union of Soviet Socialist Republics are the heraldic symbols of the respective Autonomous Soviet Republic.

Prior to the approval of the Stalinist Constitution, which created many ASSRs, many ASSRs in that time had a distinctive emblem. The emblem of the ASSRs are usually round in shape. The emblem featured predominantly the hammer and sickle and the red star that symbolised communism. The USSR State motto, Workers of the world, unite!, in both the republic's language and some Russian was also placed on each one of them. In addition to those repetitive motifs, emblems of many Soviet republics also included features that were characteristic of their local landscapes, economies or cultures. All ASSRs emblems created during the korenizatsiya era usually included national patterns. The exception to this was the Bashkir ASSR, Crimean ASSR, and Moldavian ASSR, which used the emblem similar to their respective republics. A distinctive emblem was proposed in 1925, but it failed to gain official status.

After the approval of the constitution, many ASSRs changed their emblems according to their respective republic. The emblems of the ASSR were the same as the previous emblems, with only additions in inscription.

The table below presents versions of the renderings of the ASSRs' emblems prior to the approval of the Stalinist Constitution, as well as the arms of several ASSRs that ceased to exist before that time. For comparison, the arms of present-day successor states of the ASSRs are also shown.

All ASSRs ended the usage of their pre-Stalinist emblems in 1937. This was because the Stalinist Constitution of the ASSRs were adopted in 1937, about one to three months after the adoption of the Stalinist Constitution of the USSR on 5 December 1936.

== Pre-Stalinist Emblems of the Autonomous Soviet Republics ==
Emblem is similar with the ASSRs' respective republic.

Autonomous Soviet Republic	Emblem	Main Article	Usage	Republic-specific features		Present-day national coat of arms
Adjara		Emblem of the Adjar ASSR	1922-1937	Plants	wheat, grapes	Coat of arms of Adjara
Adjara		Emblem of the Adjar ASSR	1922-1937	Landscapes, geographic features	Caucasus Mountains	Coat of arms of Adjara
Adjara		Emblem of the Adjar ASSR	1922-1937	Industry		Coat of arms of Adjara
Adjara		Emblem of the Adjar ASSR	1922-1937	Ornaments	Star and crescent	Coat of arms of Adjara
Bashkortostan		Emblem of the Bashkir ASSR	1925-1937	Plants	wheat	Coat of arms of Bashkortostan
Bashkortostan		Emblem of the Bashkir ASSR	1925-1937	Landscapes, geographic features		Coat of arms of Bashkortostan
Bashkortostan		Emblem of the Bashkir ASSR	1925-1937	Industry		Coat of arms of Bashkortostan
Bashkortostan		Emblem of the Bashkir ASSR	1925-1937	Ornaments	Baroque cartouche	Coat of arms of Bashkortostan
Chuvash		Emblem of the Chuvash ASSR	1927-1931	Plants	wheat	Coat of arms of Chuvashia
Chuvash		Emblem of the Chuvash ASSR	1927-1931	Landscapes, geographic features		Coat of arms of Chuvashia
Chuvash		Emblem of the Chuvash ASSR	1927-1931	Industry	gear	Coat of arms of Chuvashia
Chuvash		Emblem of the Chuvash ASSR	1927-1931	Ornaments	Chuvash traditional ornaments	Coat of arms of Chuvashia
Chuvash		Emblem of the Chuvash ASSR	1931-1937	Plants	wheat, oak, spruce	Coat of arms of Chuvashia
Chuvash		Emblem of the Chuvash ASSR	1931-1937	Landscapes, geographic features		Coat of arms of Chuvashia
Chuvash		Emblem of the Chuvash ASSR	1931-1937	Industry		Coat of arms of Chuvashia
Chuvash		Emblem of the Chuvash ASSR	1931-1937	Ornaments	Chuvash traditional ornaments	Coat of arms of Chuvashia
Chuvash		Emblem of the Chuvash ASSR	1937-1978	Plants	wheat, oak, spruce	Coat of arms of Chuvashia
Chuvash		Emblem of the Chuvash ASSR	1937-1978	Landscapes, geographic features		Coat of arms of Chuvashia
Chuvash		Emblem of the Chuvash ASSR	1937-1978	Industry		Coat of arms of Chuvashia
Chuvash		Emblem of the Chuvash ASSR	1937-1978	Ornaments	Chuvash traditional ornaments	Coat of arms of Chuvashia
Chuvash		Emblem of the Chuvash ASSR	1978-1992	Plant	wheat, oak, fir	Coat of arms of Chuvashia
Chuvash		Emblem of the Chuvash ASSR	1978-1992	Landscapes, geographic features		Coat of arms of Chuvashia
Chuvash		Emblem of the Chuvash ASSR	1978-1992	Industry		Coat of arms of Chuvashia
Chuvash		Emblem of the Chuvash ASSR	1978-1992	Ornaments	Chuvash traditional ornaments	Coat of arms of Chuvashia
Dagestan		Emblem of the Dagestan ASSR	1921-1927	Plants	wheat	Coat of arms of Dagestan
Dagestan		Emblem of the Dagestan ASSR	1921-1927	Landscapes, geographic features		Coat of arms of Dagestan
Dagestan		Emblem of the Dagestan ASSR	1921-1927	Industry		Coat of arms of Dagestan
Dagestan		Emblem of the Dagestan ASSR	1921-1927	Ornaments	Baroque cartouche	Coat of arms of Dagestan
Dagestan		Emblem of the Dagestan ASSR	1927-1937	Plants	vine, maize, wheat	Coat of arms of Dagestan
Dagestan		Emblem of the Dagestan ASSR	1927-1937	Landscapes, geographic features	Mount Bazardüzü	Coat of arms of Dagestan
Dagestan		Emblem of the Dagestan ASSR	1927-1937	Industry	gear	Coat of arms of Dagestan
Dagestan		Emblem of the Dagestan ASSR	1927-1937	Ornaments		Coat of arms of Dagestan
Mordovia		Emblem of the Mordovian ASSR	1934-1937	Plants	wheat, spruce, hemp	Coat of arms of Mordovia
Mordovia		Emblem of the Mordovian ASSR	1934-1937	Landscapes, geographic features		Coat of arms of Mordovia
Mordovia		Emblem of the Mordovian ASSR	1934-1937	Industry		Coat of arms of Mordovia
Mordovia		Emblem of the Mordovian ASSR	1934-1937	Ornaments		Coat of arms of Mordovia
Tatarstan		Emblem of the Tatar ASSR	1920-1926	Plants	wheat, leaves	Coat of arms of Tatarstan
Tatarstan		Emblem of the Tatar ASSR	1920-1926	Landscapes, geographic features		Coat of arms of Tatarstan
Tatarstan		Emblem of the Tatar ASSR	1920-1926	Industry	farming tools, peasant, worker	Coat of arms of Tatarstan
Tatarstan		Emblem of the Tatar ASSR	1920-1926	Ornaments	Bow and arrow	Coat of arms of Tatarstan
Tatarstan		Emblem of the Tatar ASSR	1926-1937	Plants	wheat	Coat of arms of Tatarstan
Tatarstan		Emblem of the Tatar ASSR	1926-1937	Landscapes, geographic features		Coat of arms of Tatarstan
Tatarstan		Emblem of the Tatar ASSR	1926-1937	Industry		Coat of arms of Tatarstan
Tatarstan		Emblem of the Tatar ASSR	1926-1937	Ornaments	Baroque cartouche	Coat of arms of Tatarstan
Volga German		Emblem of the Volga German ASSR	1926-1937	Plants		
Volga German		Emblem of the Volga German ASSR	1926-1937	Landscapes, geographic features		
Volga German		Emblem of the Volga German ASSR	1926-1937	Industry		
Volga German		Emblem of the Volga German ASSR	1926-1937	Ornaments		
Yakutia		Emblem of the Yakut ASSR	1926-1937	Plants	wheat	Coat of arms of Yakutia
Yakutia		Emblem of the Yakut ASSR	1926-1937	Landscapes, geographic features	Lena River, Aurora	Coat of arms of Yakutia
Yakutia		Emblem of the Yakut ASSR	1926-1937	Industry		Coat of arms of Yakutia
Yakutia		Emblem of the Yakut ASSR	1926-1937	Ornaments		Coat of arms of Yakutia
Autonomous Republics that dissolved before 1991
Crimea		Emblem of the Crimean ASSR	1921-1938	Plants	wheat	Coat of arms of Crimea
Crimea		Emblem of the Crimean ASSR	1921-1938	Landscapes, geographic features		Coat of arms of Crimea
Crimea		Emblem of the Crimean ASSR	1921-1938	Industry		Coat of arms of Crimea
Crimea		Emblem of the Crimean ASSR	1921-1938	Ornaments	Baroque cartouche	Coat of arms of Crimea
Kazakhstan		Emblem of the Kazakh ASSR	1925-1927	Plants	wheat	Emblem of Kazakhstan
Kazakhstan		Emblem of the Kazakh ASSR	1925-1927	Landscapes, geographic features		Emblem of Kazakhstan
Kazakhstan		Emblem of the Kazakh ASSR	1925-1927	Industry		Emblem of Kazakhstan
Kazakhstan		Emblem of the Kazakh ASSR	1925-1927	Ornaments	Baroque cartouche	Emblem of Kazakhstan
Kazakhstan		Emblem of the Kazakh ASSR	1927-1937	Plants	wheat, cotton	Emblem of Kazakhstan
Kazakhstan		Emblem of the Kazakh ASSR	1927-1937	Landscapes, geographic features	goats, horses, horsemen	Emblem of Kazakhstan
Kazakhstan		Emblem of the Kazakh ASSR	1927-1937	Industry	Factory	Emblem of Kazakhstan
Kazakhstan		Emblem of the Kazakh ASSR	1927-1937	Ornaments	Star and crescent	Emblem of Kazakhstan
Kyrgyzstan		Emblem of the Kirghiz ASSR	1927-1936	Plants	wheat	
Kyrgyzstan		Emblem of the Kirghiz ASSR	1927-1936	Landscapes, geographic features		
Kyrgyzstan		Emblem of the Kirghiz ASSR	1927-1936	Industry		
Kyrgyzstan		Emblem of the Kirghiz ASSR	1927-1936	Ornaments		
Moldova		Emblem of the Moldavian ASSR	1925-1929	Plants	maize, grapes	Coat of arms of Moldova
Moldova		Emblem of the Moldavian ASSR	1925-1929	Landscapes, geographic features	Dniester River, Map of Moldavian ASSR	Coat of arms of Moldova
Moldova		Emblem of the Moldavian ASSR	1925-1929	Industry		Coat of arms of Moldova
Moldova		Emblem of the Moldavian ASSR	1925-1929	Ornaments		Coat of arms of Moldova
Moldova		Emblem of the Moldavian ASSR	1929-1938	Plants	wheat	Coat of arms of Moldova
Moldova		Emblem of the Moldavian ASSR	1929-1938	Landscapes, geographic features		Coat of arms of Moldova
Moldova		Emblem of the Moldavian ASSR	1929-1938	Industry		Coat of arms of Moldova
Moldova		Emblem of the Moldavian ASSR	1929-1938	Ornaments	Baroque cartouche	Coat of arms of Moldova
Tajikistan		Emblem of the Tajik ASSR	1924-1929	Plants	wheat, cotton	Emblem of Tajikistan
Tajikistan		Emblem of the Tajik ASSR	1924-1929	Landscapes, geographic features		Emblem of Tajikistan
Tajikistan		Emblem of the Tajik ASSR	1924-1929	Industry		Emblem of Tajikistan
Tajikistan		Emblem of the Tajik ASSR	1924-1929	Ornaments		Emblem of Tajikistan
Tajikistan		Emblem of the Tajik ASSR	1929-1931	Plants	wheat, cotton	Emblem of Tajikistan
Tajikistan		Emblem of the Tajik ASSR	1929-1931	Landscapes, geographic features		Emblem of Tajikistan
Tajikistan		Emblem of the Tajik ASSR	1929-1931	Industry		Emblem of Tajikistan
Tajikistan		Emblem of the Tajik ASSR	1929-1931	Ornaments		Emblem of Tajikistan
Turkestan		Emblem of the Turkestan ASSR		Plants	wheat	
Turkestan		Emblem of the Turkestan ASSR		Landscapes, geographic features		
Turkestan		Emblem of the Turkestan ASSR		Industry		
Turkestan		Emblem of the Turkestan ASSR		Ornaments	Baroque cartouche	

=== Proposed Emblems ===
Autonomous Soviet Republic	Emblem	Proposed in	Republic-specific features		Present-day national coat of arms
Bashkortostan		1925	Plants	wheat, maize	Coat of arms of Bashkortostan
Bashkortostan		1925	Landscapes, geographic features	Mount Yamantau	Coat of arms of Bashkortostan
Bashkortostan		1925	Industry	Factories, cities	Coat of arms of Bashkortostan
Bashkortostan		1925	Ornaments		Coat of arms of Bashkortostan
Bashkortostan		1925	Others	Salawat Yulayev	Coat of arms of Bashkortostan
Checheno-Ingushetia		1982	Animals	cranes	Coat of arms of Chechnya
Checheno-Ingushetia		1982	Landscapes, geographic features		Coat of arms of Chechnya
Checheno-Ingushetia		1982	Industry		Coat of arms of Ingushetia
Checheno-Ingushetia		1982	Ornaments	flag of the Russian SFSR	Coat of arms of Ingushetia
Dagestan		1926	Plants		Coat of arms of Dagestan
Dagestan		1926	Landscapes, geographic features	Mount Bazardüzü	Coat of arms of Dagestan
Dagestan		1926	Industry		Coat of arms of Dagestan
Dagestan		1926	Ornaments		Coat of arms of Dagestan

== Bibliography ==
- Central State Archive of the Yakut ASSR (1972), "Всеякутские съезды Советов : документы и материалы. 1922-1937" [All-Yakut Congresses of the Soviets : documents and materials. 1922-1937], e.nlrs.ru (in Russian), Yakutsk: Yakutsk Book Publishing
- Andrieş-Tabac, Silviu (1998), Heraldica teritorială a Basarabiei şi Transnistriei [Territorial heraldry of Bessarabia and Transnistria] (in Romanian), Chişinău: Museum

== See also ==
- Emblems of the Soviet Republics
- Coats of arms of the Yugoslav Socialist Republics
- List of coats of arms of the Russian Federation
