= Mordovia (disambiguation) =

Mordovia may refer to:

- Republic of Mordovia, a federal subject of Russia
- Mordovian Okrug (1928–1930), an administrative division of the Russian SFSR, Soviet Union
- Mordovian Autonomous Oblast (1930–1934), an administrative division of the Russian SFSR, Soviet Union
- Mordovian Autonomous Soviet Socialist Republic (1934–1994), an administrative division of the Russian SFSR, Soviet Union

== See also ==
- Moldova (disambiguation)
