= History of Mordovian sport =

Saransk is one of the major sport centers in Volga region because of the conditions made for the development of amateur and professional sports. In the city there are such large sport facilities as the Republican Sports Palace, the Ice Palace, the Sport Complex "Mordovia", Leonid Arkaev Sports Center, sport and health clubs, as well as gyms. In Mordovia there is a great number of sports schools, training outstanding athletes. Mordovia is famous also for Olympic champions such as Aleksey Mishin (wrestler), Denis Nizhegorodov, Valeriy Borchin, Olga Kaniskina and many world and Russian champions in various sports.

== Before World War II ==
Physical exercises in Mordovia have been the means of education, upbringing and training young people to prepare them for labor military activities since ancient times. At the beginning of the 20th century sport as civic movement was not formed yet. The Central Executive Committee formed the Council of Physical Education to develop sport. On May 24, 1936 there was the first Republican Sport Contest. Athletic events have been carried out in Saransk since 1934. Other sports such as ice hockey and shooting began to develop in 1938.

== World War II ==
Many sportsmen were fighting in the Red Army (The Workers' and Peasants' Red Army, RKKA) during the World War II. Many secondary school teachers of physical training worked in the hospitals. During that period the Republic held “Fighting for the Motherland” annual military and physical games.

== 1946-1960 ==
In 1946 the first stadium was built with the capacity of 3000 seats (present-day stadium “Svetotekchnika”). In 1947 the first sport schools for children and teenagers were opened in Saransk and Temnikov. In 1948 the decree “Development of Mass Sport Movement in the Country” was accepted to make the year of sports in the Republic. Many sport facilities were built that year. People actively participated and set records in different kinds of sport. In 1940-1950 K. Mayuchaya (Lapteva) won the medals in track and field. In 1953 the first Masters of Sport were trained. They were acrobats N. Yefremov and T. Sychova. Y. Maskinskov took a special place in the history. He won the silver medal in race walking in the 15 the Olympic Games in Melbourne (Australia) and won race walking European Championship in Stockholm (Sweden) in 1958. In the same year a weightlifter N. Agapov became the first in the history of Mordovian Sport Master of Sport in power lifting in USSR. In 1960 P. Bolotnikov (track and field) and M. Shubina (canoe racing) became Olympic championship in Rome (Italy).

== 1970-1980 ==
It was the decade of developing sports infrastructure. The stadium “Svetoteckhnika" was opened with the capacity of 22000 seats. It was the main sport facility in the republic.

Integral part of sport development is Sport Schools. There were 41 Sport Schools as well as 60 Sport Clubs in Mordovia. These Sport Clubs played an important role in upbringing and training inner-city children and teenagers. Volleyball, track and field, Greco-Roman wrestling and cross-country skiing became popular among the youth.

== 1990-2000 ==
Since the 1990s, BMX-sport, ice speedway and powerlifting (power triathlon) has been developing. This period is marked by annual international track and field events for the prize of P.Bolotnikov, international race walking for the prize of Y.Maskinskov, Greco-Roman wrestling competitions for the prize of M.Devyataev, individual and team World and European championship in ice speedway. Since 2000 the great attention is paid to the development of tennis and rural mass sports. This decade saw the beginning of the career of multimedallist Alexei Nemov.

== 21st century ==
In 2004 at the Athens Olympic Games Aleksey Mishin (wrestler) from Saransk won the gold medal. Race walkers Denis Nizhegorodov and Aleksey Voyevodin (from neighbour Penza) won the silver and bronze medals respectively. In 2008 Olga Kaniskina, Valeriy Borchin and Denis Nizhegorodov won two gold and one bronze Olympic medals.

In 2009 Olga Kaniskina, Valeriy Borchin and Sergey Kirdyapkin won all the gold at the World Championship in Berlin. They won at all distances in race walking. In 2010 Olga Kaniskina, Anisya Kirdyapkina and Vera Sokolova (from neighbour Chuvashia) won all three medals in the women's race walking competition for 20 kilometers at the European Championships in Barcelona. Other race walkers from Mordovia include: Elena Lashmanova, Olena Shumkina, Irina Stankina, Sergey Bakulin, Stanislav Emelyanov, Vladimir Kanaykin, Sergey Kirdyapkin (married to Anisya), Sergey Morozov and Roman Rasskazov. Their data are as follows (Youth or Junior omitted):

Name	Surname	Sex	Date and place of birth	Olympic medals	World medals	European medals
Olga	Kaniskina	F	1985 Napolnaya Tavla, Kochkurovsky District	2008 20 km gold and 2012 20 km silver	3 gold champion	1 silver champion
Anisya	Kirdyapkina, née Kornikova	F	1989 Saransk		1 bronze champion	1 silver champion
Elena	Lashmanova	F	1989 n/a	2012 20 km gold	1 gold cup	
Olena	Shumkina	F	1988 Atyuryevsky District	n/a	n/a	n/a
Irina	Stankina	F	1977 Saransk		1 gold champion, 1 gold cup	
Sergey	Bakulin	M	1986 Insar		1 gold champion, 1 gold Universiade	1 bronze champion
Valeriy	Borchin	M	1986 Povadimovo, near Saransk	2008 20 km gold	2 gold champion	1 silver champion
Stanislav	Emelyanov	M	1990 Saransk			1 gold champion
Vladimir	Kanaykin	M	1985 Atyuryevo		1 silver champion	1 gold cup
Sergey	Kirdyapkin	M	1980 Insar	2012 50 km gold	2 gold champion	1 gold cup
Sergey	Morozov	M	1988 Saransk			
Denis	Nizhegorodov	M	1980 Saransk	2004 50 km silver and 2008 50 km bronze	1 silver champion, 2 gold cups	
Roman	Rasskazov	M	1979 Kowylkino		1 gold and 1 bronze champion	

In November 2009, Mordovia was chosen to hold the World Cup of Race Walking in 2012. In 8–9 September 2011 III International Sports Forum "Russia - Country of Sports" was held in the capital of Mordovia.
