= Chamzinka =

Chamzinka (Russian: Чамзинка) is the name of several inhabited localities in Russia.

Urban localities

- Chamzinka, Chamzinsky District, Republic of Mordovia, a work settlement in Chamzinsky District of the Republic of Mordovia; 54°24′N 45°47′E

Rural localities

- Chamzinka, Atyashevsky District, Republic of Mordovia, a village in Ushakovsky Selsoviet of Atyashevsky District in the Republic of Mordovia; 54°39′N 46°3′E
- Chamzinka, Ulyanovsk Oblast, a selo in Korzhevsky Rural Okrug of Inzensky District in Ulyanovsk Oblast
