= Mordovia =

First-level administrative division of Russia

Republic of Mordovia Республика Мордовия (Russian)
- Republic

Other transcription(s)
  - Moksha: Мордовия Республикась
  - Erzya: Мордовия Республикась
- Flag Coat of arms
- Anthem: State Anthem of the Republic of Mordovia

- Location within European Russia
- Coordinates: 54°26′N 44°27′E
- Country: Russia
- Federal district: Volga
- Economic region: Volga-Vyatka
- Established: December 20, 1934
- Capital: Saransk

Government
  - Body: State Assembly
  - Head: Artyom Zdunov

Area
  - Total: 26,128 km^{2} (10,088 sq mi)
  - Rank: 68th

Population (2021 census)
  - Total: 783,552: 37.1% Mordvins; 51.82% Russians; 5.09% Tatars; 0.18% Ukrainians; 5.8% other/not stated
  - Estimate (2018): 805,056
  - Rank: 58th
  - Density: 29.989/km^{2} (77.671/sq mi)
  - Urban: 63.3%
  - Rural: 36.7%

GDP (nominal, 2024)
  - Total: ₽477 billion (US$5.6 billion)
  - Per capita: ₽625,379 (US$7,338.32)
- Time zone: UTC+3 (MSK)
- ISO 3166 code: RU-MO
- License plates: 13, 113
- OKTMO ID: 89000000
- Official languages: Russian; Mordvin (Moksha and Erzya)
- Website: www.e-mordovia.ru

Mordovia (/mɔːrˈdoʊvɪə/ mor-DOH-vee-ə), (Note: Russian: Мордовия, romanized: Mordovija, IPA: [mɐrˈdovʲɪjə]; Moksha and Erzya: Мордовиясь, romanized: Mordoviäś) officially the Republic of Mordovia, (Note: Russian: Республика Мордовия, romanized: Respublika Mordovija, IPA: [rʲɪˈspublʲɪkə mɐrˈdovʲɪjə]; Moksha: Мордовия Республиксь, romanized: Mordovija Respublikś; Erzya: Мордовия Республикась, romanized: Mordovija Respublikaś) is a republic of Russia, situated in Eastern Europe. Its capital is the city of Saransk. As of the 2010 Census, the population of the republic was 834,755. Ethnic Russians (53.1%) and Mordvins (39.8%) account for the majority of the population.

== History ==
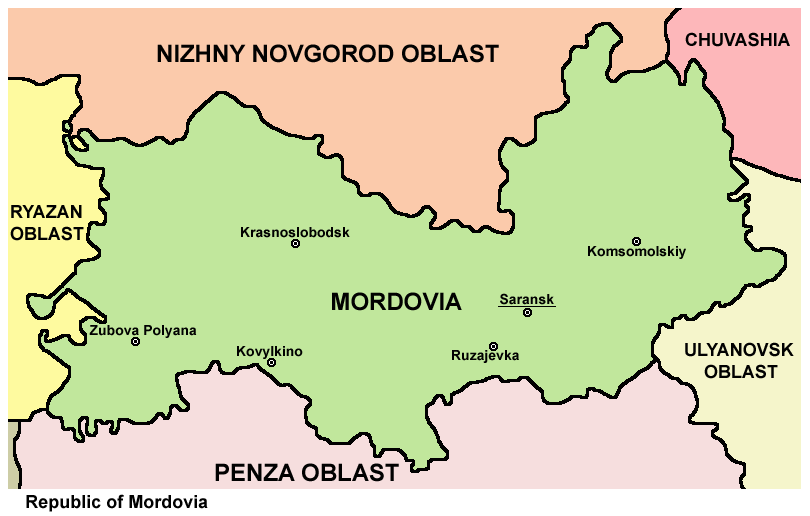
Map of the Republic of Mordovia

=== Early history ===
The earliest archaeological signs of modern humans in the area of Mordovia are from the Neolithic era. Mordvins are mentioned in written sources from the 6th century. Later, Mordvins were under the influence of both Volga Bulgaria and the Kievan Rus. Mordvin princes sometimes raided Muroma and Volga Bulgaria and often despoiled each other's holdings.

Mordovia was briefly united under the Principality of Purgaz, led by Erzya prince Purgaz, who fought against the colonisation of the region by Vladimir-Suzdal. The Mordvin tribes were then plunged into a civil war between Purgaz, who was supported by Volga Bulgaria, and Puresh, a Moksha prince backed by Vladimir-Suzdal. The Principality of Purgaz survived the war with Vladimir-Suzdal, which ended in 1232, and was later subjugated to the Golden Horde as the Mukhsha Ulus.

The Golden Horde disintegrated in the 1430s, which resulted in some Mordvins becoming subjects of the Khanate of Kazan, whereas others were incorporated into Muscovy.

=== Part of the Russian Empire ===
After Ivan IV of Russia annexed the Khanate of Kazan in 1552, the Mordvin lands were subjugated by the Russian monarchy. The Mordvin elite rapidly adopted the Russian language and Russian customs, whereas 1821 saw the publication of the New Testament in Erzya to address the non-elite population. In rural areas, the Mordvin culture was preserved. Russians started to convert Mordvins to Orthodox Christianity in the mid-18th century. Mordvins gave up their own shamanist religion only slowly, however, and many of the shamanist features were preserved as parts of local culture, though the population became nominally Christian. Translations of literature to Mordvinic languages were mostly religious books. In the 18th century, the Latin alphabet was used to write Mordvin, but from the mid-19th century, Cyrillic was used. The region of modern-day Mordovia was mainly organized as a part of Penza Governorate over the late 18th and the 19th centuries.

=== Part of the Soviet Union ===
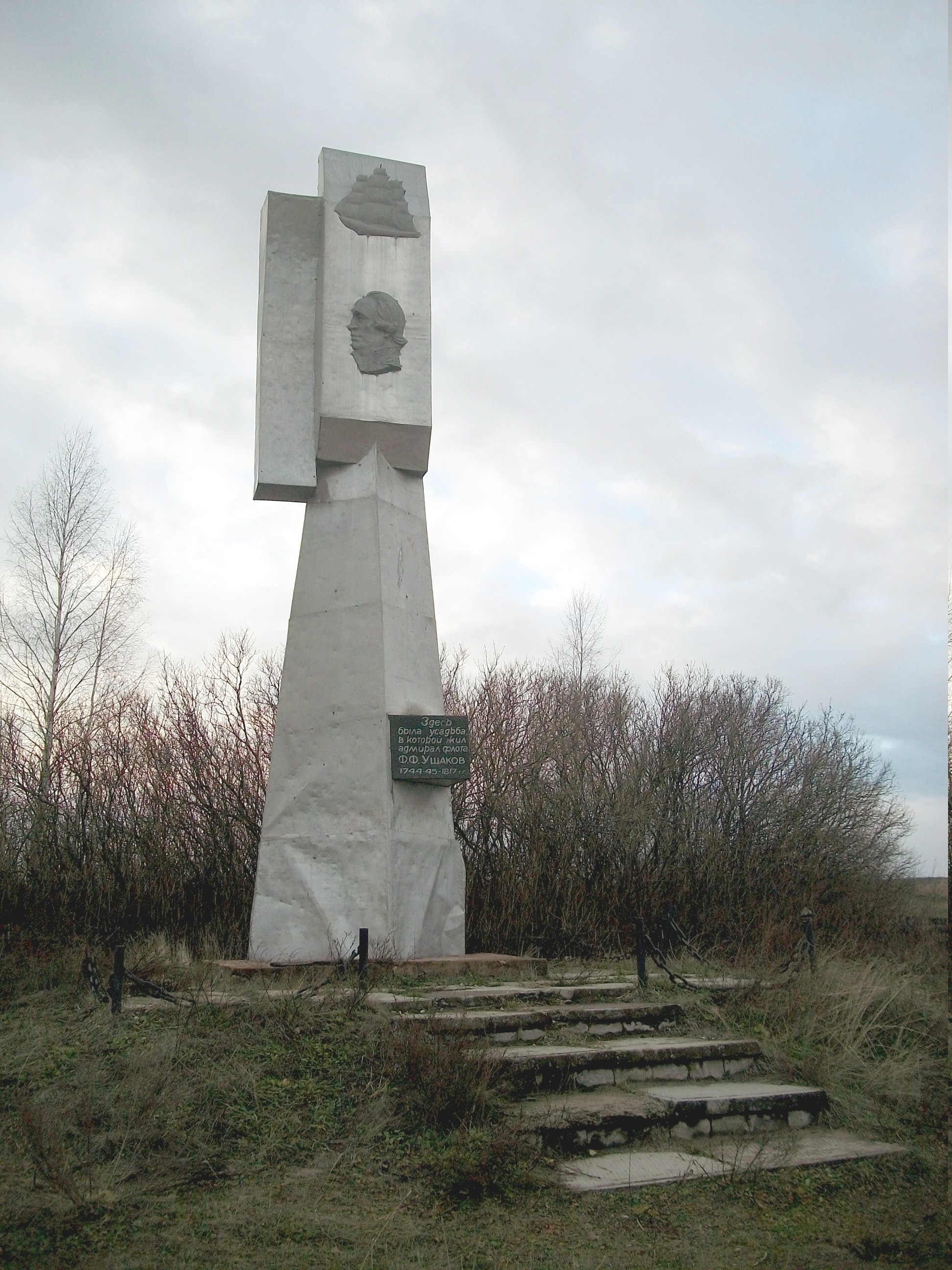
A monument to Fyodor Ushakov in Alekseevka, Temnikovsky District

During the Russian Revolution and Russian Civil War, Mordovia was held by Bolsheviks from the beginning of the war. When the Bolsheviks prevailed in the war, Mordovia became a part of the Russian SFSR. In 1925, the Soviet government founded autonomous districts and village councils in the area of the Mordvins. During the Soviet era, two written languages were developed, one based on the Erzya dialect in 1922 and one on the Moksha dialect in 1923, both using Cyrillic script. The Mordovian Okrug was founded on 16 July 1928, and it was elevated to the status of an autonomous oblast becoming the Mordovian Autonomous Oblast on 10 January 1930. The autonomous oblast was transformed into the Mordovian Autonomous Soviet Socialist Republic on 20 December 1934. Several forced labor Gulags were established under the Bolsheviks, such as Temlag.

=== Part of the Russian Federation ===
When the Soviet Union disintegrated, the Mordovian ASSR proclaimed itself the Mordovian Soviet Socialist Republic in 1990 and remained a part of the Russian Federation. Mordovia was one of only two republics that did not proclaim sovereignty. On 25 January 1994, it was renamed the Republic of Mordovia.

== Geography ==
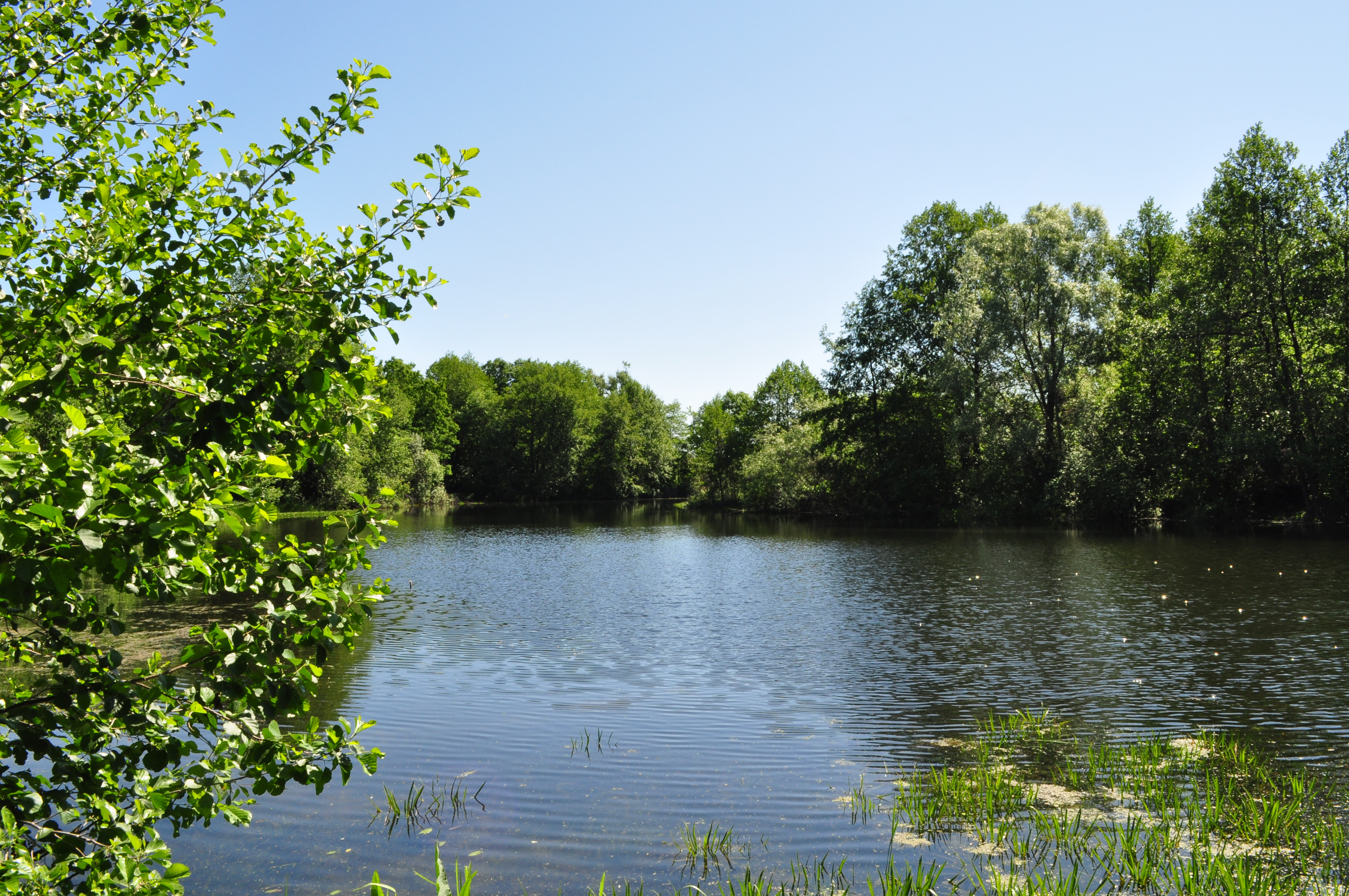
Lake Chevan Erke

The republic is located in the eastern part of the East European Plain of Russia. The western part of the republic is situated in the Oka–Don Plain; its eastern and central parts are located in the Volga Upland.

- Area: 26,200 square kilometers (10,100 sq mi)
- Borders:
  - internal: Nizhny Novgorod Oblast (N), Chuvashia (NE/E), Ulyanovsk Oblast (E/SE), Penza Oblast (S/SW), Ryazan Oblast (W/NW)
- Highest point: 324 meters (1,063 ft) (crossing of the road from Bolshoy Maresev with the roads to Mokshaley, Pyaigiley, and Picheury)

=== Rivers ===
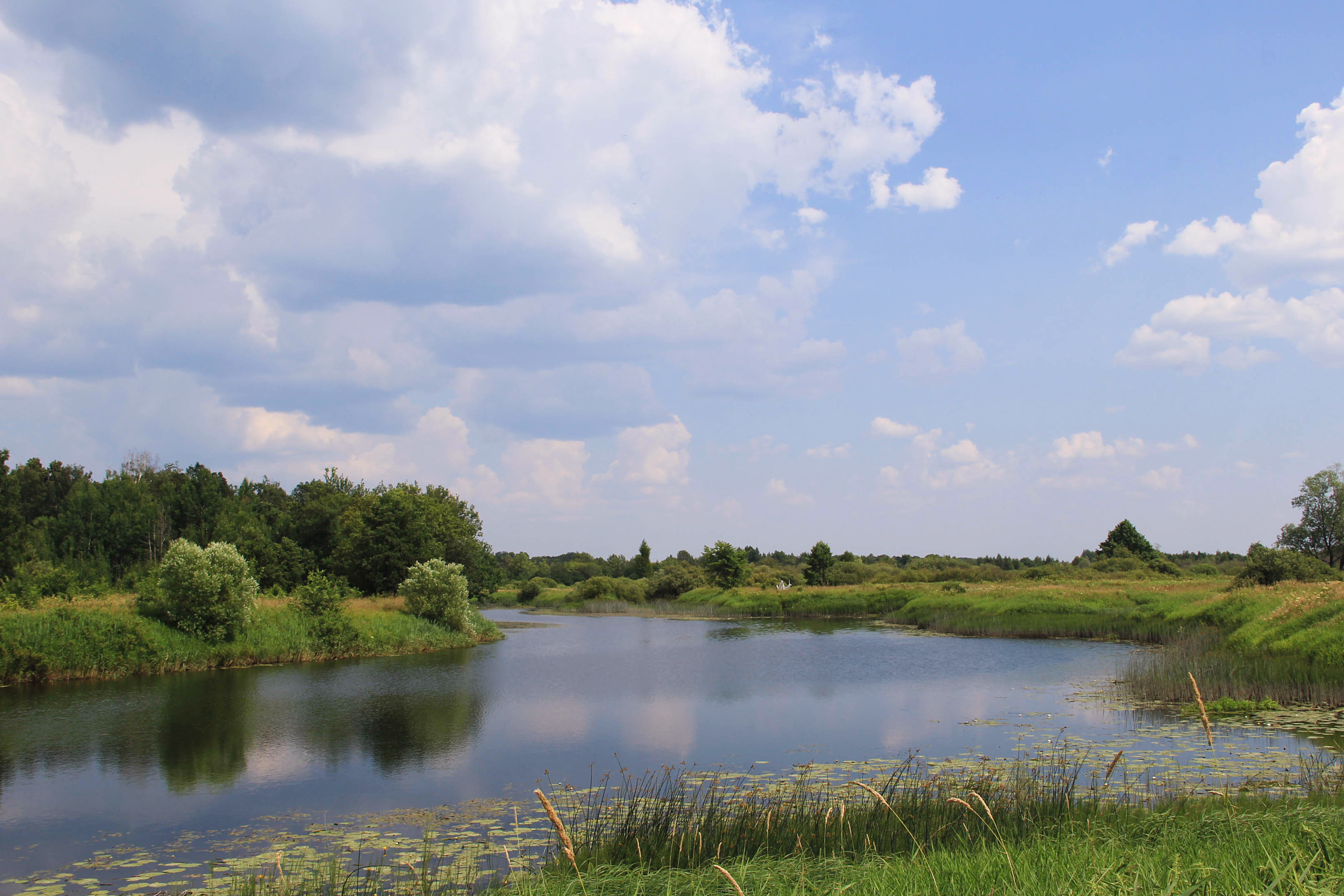
Protected area

There are 114 rivers in the republic. Major rivers include:

- Alatyr River (Erzya: Rator)
- Issa River
- Moksha River
- Satis River
- Sivin River
- Sura River
- Vad River

=== Lakes ===
There are approximately five hundred lakes in the republic.

=== Natural resources ===
Natural resources include peat, mineral waters, and others.

=== Climate ===
The climate is moderately continental.

- Average January temperature: −11 °C (12 °F)
- Average July temperature: +19 °C (66 °F)
- Average annual precipitation: ~500 millimeters (20 in)

== Administrative divisions ==
Mordovia, Russia
Capital: Saransk
As of 2014:
Number of districts (районы)	22
Number of cities/towns (города)	7
Number of urban-type settlements (посёлки городского типа)	13
Number of selsovets (сельсоветы)	344
As of 2002:
Number of rural localities (сельские населённые пункты)	1,313
Number of uninhabited rural localities (сельские населённые пункты без населения)	29

Mordovia is divided into 22 districts called raions. The city of Saransk is administrated separately from the districts as an urban okrug.

== Politics ==
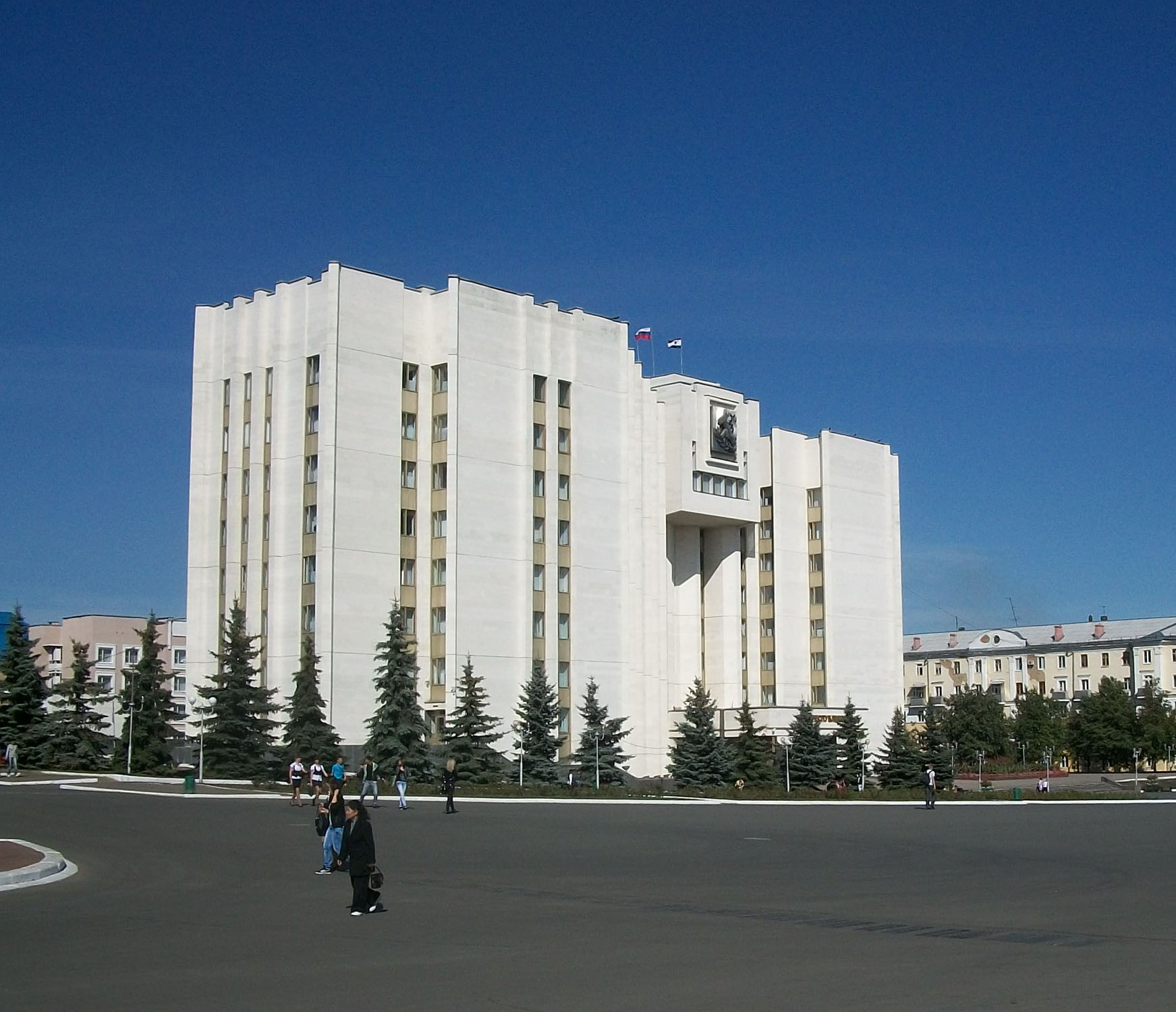
Seat of the Government, completed in 1986.

The supreme law is the Constitution of the Republic of Mordovia.

During the Parade of Sovereignties among other former Russian autonomous republics, Mordovia established a presidency in 1991.

In that same year, Vasily Guslyannikov, a physicist by training, was elected in the general election. Guslyannikov had previously been a senior researcher at the Institute of Power Electronics and was the leader of the republican branch of the Democratic Russia political movement.

In 1993, the Supreme Council of Mordovia abolished the post of president, on the basis of which Guslyannikov was removed from his post. Guslyannikov appealed the action of the supreme legislative body of the republic in the Russian Constitutional Court, but the Constitutional Court declared its conformity with the Constitution of Russia.

The head of the government in the Republic of Mordovia is the Head of the Republic. The office is currently held by Artyom Zdunov, who was made acting head on 18 November 2020. His predecessor was Vladimir Volkov who held the office from 2012.

The State Assembly is the legislature of the republic.

The Republic of Mordovia has regional offices of the main political parties: United Russia, the Communist Party of the Russian Federation, the Liberal Democratic Party of Russia, A Just Russia, Yabloko, and Right Cause. In the republic's parliament - the State Assembly of the Republic of Mordovia - deputies from United Russia and the Communist Party are represented. However, other political forces can work publicly, for example, in the Public Chamber of Mordovia.

== Judiciary ==
As a republic of Russia, Mordovia has its own supreme court, the Supreme Court of the Republic of Mordovia (Russian: Верховный Суд Республики Мордовия). Its current headquarters lie in the capital Saransk, on Leo Tolstoy Street, 21.

After the judicial reform of Alexander II, the local judiciaries of the Russian Empire, including in what is now Mordovia, have been mostly operated by the justice of the community: they judged minor and civil cases. During the Soviet era, these would be replaced by the people's courts of different levels. During the period of korenizatsiia, much of the Russian-language judiciary in Mordovia was translated to the local language (in this instance the Mordvinic languages) by lawyer Timofey Vasilyev.

== Economy ==
The most developed industries are machine construction, chemicals, woodworking, and food industries. Most of the industrial enterprises are located in the capital Saransk, as well as in the towns of Kovylkino and Ruzayevka, and in the urban-type settlements of Chamzinka and Komsomolsky.

The largest companies in the region include Unimilk (branch of Danone Russia), Ruzayevsky Chemical Machine-Building Plant, Mordovcement, Saranskkabel.

== Demographics ==
The population of Mordovia is 783,552 (2021 census); .

=== Settlements ===
Largest cities or towns in Mordovia 2010 Russian Census
Rank		Administrative Division	Pop.
1	Saransk	City of republic significance of Saransk	297,415
2	Ruzayevka	Ruzayevsky District	47,523
3	Kovylkino	Kovylkinsky District	21,307
4	Komsomolsky	Chamzinsky District	13,513
5	Zubova Polyana	Zubovo-Polyansky District	10,338
6	Krasnoslobodsk	Krasnoslobodsky District	10,151
7	Chamzinka	Chamzinsky District	9,463
8	Romodanovo	Romodanovsky District	9,410
9	Ardatov	Ardatovsky District	9,400
10	Torbeyevo	Torbeyevsky District	9,373

Historical population
Year	Pop.	±%
1926	1,260,073	—
1959	1,001,994	−20.5%
1970	1,029,562	+2.8%
1979	990,617	−3.8%
1989	964,132	−2.7%
2002	888,766	−7.8%
2010	834,755	−6.1%
2021	783,552	−6.1%
Source: Census data

=== Vital statistics ===
Source: Russian Federal State Statistics Service

	Average population (x 1000)	Live births	Deaths	Natural change	Crude birth rate (per 1000)	Crude death rate (per 1000)	Natural change (per 1000)	Fertility rates
1970	1 026	15 423	9 048	6 375	15.0	8.8	6.2	
1975	1 003	14 983	9 689	5 294	14.9	9.7	5.3	
1980	984	14 320	10 287	4 033	14.6	10.5	4.1	
1985	964	15 123	11 152	3 971	15.7	11.6	4.1	
1990	963	12 910	11 018	1 892	13.4	11.4	2.0	1,87
1991	961	11 537	11 079	458	12.0	11.5	0.5	1,73
1992	961	10 215	11 574	1 359	10.6	12.0	1.4	1,55
1993	959	9 276	13 217	3 941	9.7	13.8	4.1	1,42
1994	956	8 916	14 748	5 832	9.3	15.4	6.1	1,37
1995	952	8 589	13 460	4 871	9.0	14.1	5.1	1,32
1996	946	7 883	13 579	5 696	8.3	14.4	6.0	1,22
1997	939	7 493	13 631	6 138	8.0	14.5	6.5	1,16
1998	931	7 469	13 116	5 647	8.0	14.1	6.1	1,16
1999	923	6 994	14 200	7 206	7.6	15.4	7.8	1,09
2000	913	7 148	14 838	7 690	7.8	16.2	8.4	1,12
2001	903	7 049	14 200	7 151	7.8	15.7	7.9	1,11
2002	891	7 131	14 918	7 787	8.0	16.7	8.7	1,12
2003	880	7 433	15 170	7 737	8.4	17.2	8.8	1,16
2004	873	7 689	14 768	7 079	8.8	16.9	8.1	1,20
2005	865	7 394	14 823	7 429	8.5	17.1	8.6	1,14
2006	858	7 367	13 981	6 614	8.6	16.3	7.7	1,14
2007	851	7 728	13 320	5 592	9.1	15.6	6.6	1,19
2008	846	8 215	13 167	4 952	9.7	15.6	5.9	1,28
2009	841	8 103	13 027	4 924	9.6	15.5	5.9	1,27
2010	835	7 974	13 106	5 132	9.5	15.7	6.1	1,24
2011	830	7 896	12 310	4 414	9.5	14.8	5.3	1,25
2012	822	8 180	11 925	3 745	10.0	14.5	4.5	1,32
2013	815	8 256	12 095	3 839	10.1	14.8	4.7	1,37
2014	811	8 133	11 621	3 488	10.0	14.3	4.3	1,37
2015	808	7 864	11 431	3 567	9.7	14.2	4.5	1,36
2016	808	7 975	11 367	3 392	9.9	14.1	4.2	1,40
2017	806	6 884	10 849	3 965	8.5	13.5	-5.0	1,26

=== Ethnic groups ===
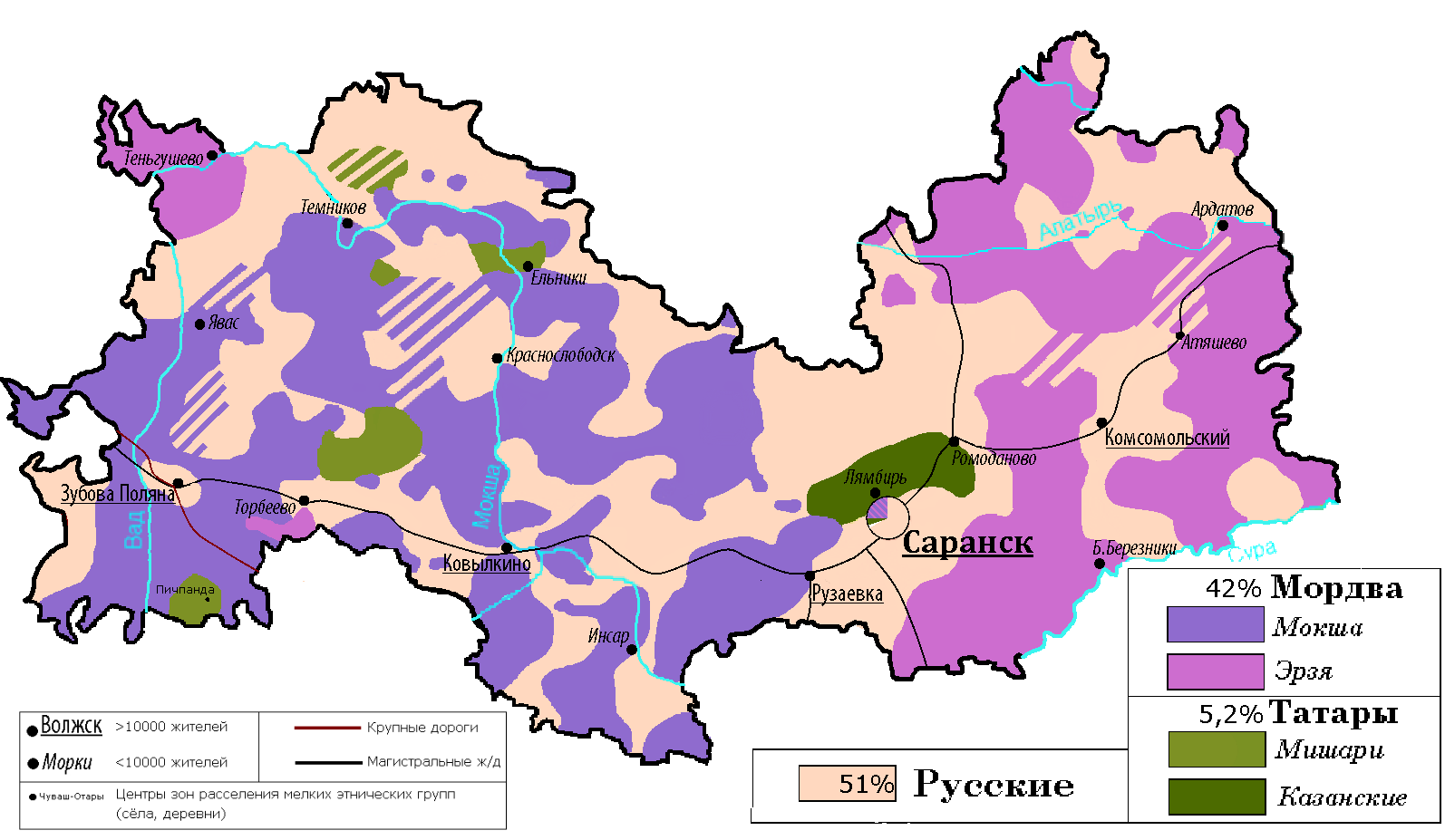
Ethnic map of Mordovia

The Mordvin people are a Volga Finnic group speaking two related languages, Moksha and Erzya. The Mordvins identify themselves as separate ethnic groups: the Erzya and Moksha. Only one-third of all Mordvinic languages speakers live in the Republic of Mordovia. During the Soviet period, school textbooks were published in each language.

According to the 2010 Census, Russians make up 53.4% of the republic's population, while ethnic Erzya and Moksha are 39.8%. Other groups include Tatars (5.2%), Ukrainians (0.6%), and a host of smaller groups, each accounting for less than 0.5% of the total population.

Ethnic group	1939 census		1959 census		1970 census		1979 census		1989 census		2002 census		2010 census^{1}		2021 census		
Ethnic group	Number	%	Number	%	Number	%	Number	%	Number	%	Number	%	Number	%	Number	%	% of those who stated ethnicity
Russians	719,117	60.53	590,557	59.04	606,817	58.94	591,212	59.75	586,147	60.83	540,717	60.84	443,737	53.05	406,061	51.82	54.09
Mordvins	405,031	34.09	357,978	35.79	364,689	35.42	338,898	34.25	313,420	32.53	283,861	31.94	333,112	39.83	290,750	37.11	38.73
Tatars	47,386	3.99	38,636	3.86	44,954	4.37	45,765	4.63	47,328	4.91	46,261	5.21	43,392	5.19	39,855	5.09	5.31
Ukrainians	7,586	0.64	6,554	0.66	6,033	0.59	5,622	0.57	6,461	0.67	4,801	0.54	4,801	0.57	1,414	0.18	0.19
Other Ethnicities	8,884	0.75	6,468	0.65	7,069	0.69	8,012	0.81	10,148	1.05	13,126	1.48	11,361	1.36	12,601	1.61	1.68
Ethnicity not stated															32,867	4.19	
TOTAL	1,188,004	100.00	1,000,193	100.00	1,029,562	100.00	989,509	100.00	963,504	100.00	888,766	100.00	836,403	100.00	783,552	100%	100%
^{1} 3,153 people were registered from administrative databases, and could not declare an ethnicity. It is estimated that the proportion of ethnicities in this group is the same as that of the declared group.

=== Religion ===
Religion in Mordovia as of 2012 (Sreda Arena Atlas)
Russian Orthodoxy	68.6%
Old Believers	0.6%
Other Christians	4.9%
Islam	2.4%
Spiritual but not religious	9.7%
Atheism and irreligion	7.2%
Other and undeclared	6.6%

According to a 2012 survey, 68.6% of the population of Mordovia adhere to the Russian Orthodox Church (there are many churches and monasteries, for example, Monastery of John the Evangelist in Makarovka), 5% are unaffiliated Christians, 2% are Muslims, 1% are Old Believers. In addition, 10% of the population declares to be "spiritual but not religious", 7% are atheist, and 6.4% follow Buddhism only in the city of Saransk. Some Mordvins adhere to the Mordvin native religion.

=== Education ===
The most important facilities of higher education include Mordovian State University and Mordovian State Pedagogical Institute in Saransk.

== Culture ==
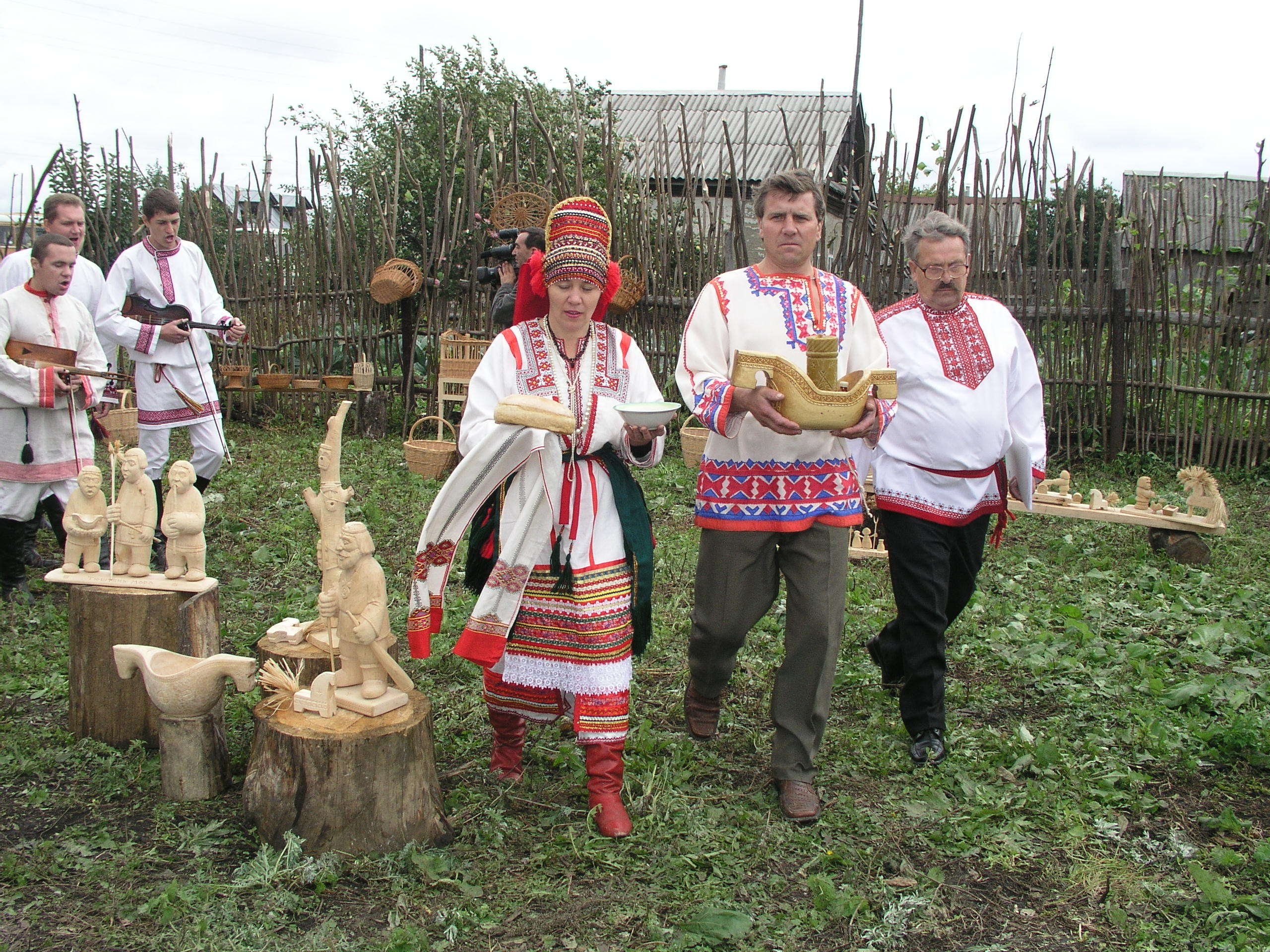
Ethnographic Museum «Ethno-kudo» named after V. Romashkin

There are many museums in the republic. The largest ones include the Mordovian Republican United Museum of Regional Studies and the Museum of Mordvinian Culture in Saransk.

The National Library of the Republic of Mordovia is the largest library in the republic.

The State Puppet Theater of the Republic of Mordovia, located in Saransk, is well known in Russia. Most of the plays performed in this theater are Russian fairy-tales.

Erzya literature experienced a renaissance in the 1920s and 1930s.

The House and Museum of F. Sychkov was opened on March 11, 1970, at Kochelaevo, Kovylkinsky District after a reconstruction.

Mordovian cuisine is widespread in the country.

=== Penal colonies ===
Mordovia is home to multiple penal colonies. Prisons in Mordovia are regarded by many as having conditions harsher than most Russian prisons. According to University of Helsinki sociologist Olga Zeveleva, who works with the Gulag Echoes project studying Russian prison conditions, "Prisons in Mordovia are notoriously terrible, even by Russian standards. The prisons there are known for the harsh regimes and human rights violations." According to The Guardian, a popular saying among female prison inmates in Russia is "If you haven't done time in Mordovia, you haven't done time at all." The prison was built as a part of a system of similar prisons in the region in the 1930s during the Soviet era. University of Oxford scholar Judith Pallot described the prison as being "stuck in time for 50 years." Violence from other prisoners and prison guards is not as frequent as in men's prisons, but is not uncommon. Among the prisoners held in Mordovia's penal colonies was Paul Whelan, a U.S. citizen accused of spying and sentenced to 16 years. Jailed in 2020, he was released in a United States-Russia prisoner swap in 2024. Stephen Hubbard, a U.S. citizen accused of participating as a mercenary against Russia was detained here before being released in October 2026.

=== Sport ===
Mordovia, along with neighbours Chuvashia and Penza Oblast, has given the following racewalking athletes, both women (Olga Kaniskina, Anisya Kirdyapkina, Elena Lashmanova, Olena Shumkina, Irina Stankina) and men (Sergey Bakulin, Valeriy Borchin, Stanislav Emelyanov, Vladimir Kanaykin, Sergey Kirdyapkin, Sergey Morozov, Denis Nizhegorodov, Roman Rasskazov), apart from Alexei Nemov (see more in the article History of Mordovian sport).

== Language ==
The Mordvinic languages, alternatively Mordvin languages, or Mordvinian languages (Russian: Мордовские языки, Mordovskiye yazyki, the official Russian term for the language pair), are a subgroup of the Uralic languages, comprising the closely related Erzya language and Moksha language. Previously considered a single "Mordvin language", it is now treated as a small language grouping consisting of just two languages. Due to differences in phonology, lexicon, and grammar, Erzya and Moksha are not mutually intelligible, so the Russian language is often used for intergroup communications.

The two Mordvinic languages also have separate literary forms. The Erzya literary language was created in 1922 and the Mokshan in 1923.

The two Mordvinic languages are official languages of Mordovia along with Russian.

== See also ==
- Music in Mordovia
- History of Mordovian sport
