= AASSR =

AASSR may refer to:

- The Abkhaz Autonomous Soviet Socialist Republic, an autonomous polity of the Georgian SSR
- The Adjarian Autonomous Soviet Socialist Republic, an autonomous polity of the Georgian SSR
