= Flag of the Mordovian Autonomous Soviet Socialist Republic =

This was adopted in 1954 by the Government of The Mordovian

Mordovian Autonomous Soviet Socialist Republic
- Flag of the Mordovian ASSR (1954–1990)
- Use: Civil and state flag
- Proportion: 1:2
- Adopted: 1954
- Design: A red flag with a light-blue stripe at the pole, with golden red star and hammer and sickle.
- Designed by: Valentin Petrovich Viktorov

The flag of the Mordovian Autonomous Soviet Socialist Republic was adopted in 1954 by the government of the Mordovian Autonomous Soviet Socialist Republic. The flag is identical to the flag of the Russian Soviet Federative Socialist Republic, but with "Mordovian ASSR" in Russian, Moksha and Erzya.

== History ==
=== First version ===
The first Congress of Soviets of the Mordovian ASSR from 22 until 27 December 1934 approved the flag of the Mordovian ASSR by a decree of 27 December.

The state flag of the Mordovian ASSR consisting of a red or scarlet cloth, in the upper left-hand corner there is a golden sickle and a hammer placed crosswise with the arms downwards. Above the hammer and sickle inscription in gold letters "MASSR". The inscription on the upper right corner of the flag: “Proletarians of all countries, unite!” In Moksha, Erzya and Russian. The ratio of the width of the flag to the length is 1:2.

— Decree On the State Flag of the Mordovian ASSR (1934)

=== Second version ===
On August 30, 1937, the Extraordinary 2nd Congress of Councils of the Mordovian ASSR adopted the Constitution of the ASSR. The flag of the Mordovian ASSR was described in article 111, it was a red cloth with golden inscriptions "RSFSR" and "Mordovian ASSR" in Russian, in Erzya and Moksha.

=== Third version ===
After the new flag of the RSFSR changed in 1954, the flag of the Mordovian ASSR also changed in the same year.

The extraordinary 9th session of the Supreme Council of the Mordovian ASSR of the 9th convocation, adopted a new Constitution of the Mordovian ASSR on May 30, 1978. The flag, which was described in the Article 158 of the constitution, remained unchanged. By the Decree of the Supreme Council of the Mordovian ASSR, the Statute on the flag of the Mordovian ASSR was introduced, which was amended slightly by the Law of June 3, 1981.

== As the Mordovian SSR ==
On 7 December 1990, the government of the Mordovian ASSR adopted the Declaration on the Legal Status of the Mordovia, which changed the status of the republic from an ASSR to an SSR. From 1990 and until 1995, when the new flag of Mordovia was introduced, the Mordovian SSR uses its previous flag, but with the inscription "ASSR" being replaced by "SSR".

== Gallery ==
27 December 1934 - 30 August 1937

30 August 1937 - 1954

1954 - 7 December 1990

7 December 1990 (as the Mordovian SSR) - 30 March 1995 (adoption of the Flag of Mordovia)

== See also ==
- Emblem of the Mordovian Autonomous Soviet Socialist Republic
- Flag of Mordovia
- Flag of the Russian Soviet Federative Socialist Republic
