= Flag of Adjara =

Autonomous Republic of Adjara
- Proportion: 2:3
- Adopted: 20 July 2004
- Design: Seven horizontal stripes alternating blue and white; in the canton, the national flag of Georgia.

The flag of Adjara is a flag of Georgia's autonomous republic of Adjara. It displays seven dark blue and white stripes, with the national flag of Georgia shown in canton. The current flag was adopted on 20 July 2004 by the Supreme Council of Adjara.

== History ==
=== Adjarian ASSR (1978–1990) and the Autonomous Republic of Adjara (1990–1991) ===
1978–1991

Under the Soviet Union, the Adjarian Autonomous Soviet Socialist Republic (AASSR) had its own flag between 1921 and 1950 and again between 1978 and 1991. This consisted of a motif very similar to that of the parent Georgian Soviet Socialist Republic, plus the initials of the AASSR in Georgian.

=== Autonomous Republic of Adjara (2000–2004) ===
2000–2004

Flag of the Democratic Union for Revival

Between June 2000 and July 2004, a different flag was used by the government of Aslan Abashidze. The blue background represents the Black Sea, while the seven stars represent Adjara's two cities (Batumi and Kobuleti) and five districts (Batumi, Kobuleti, Keda, Shuakhevi, Khulo). Party Democratic Union for Revival to which Abashidze belonged used a similar flag with more stars.

=== Autonomous Republic of Adjara (2004–present) ===

The flag ratified by the Supreme Council of the autonomous republic on July 20, 2004. In the canton, the new flag of Georgia.

== Sources ==
- Flags of the World

== See also ==
- Coat of arms of Adjara
