= Flag of Mordovia =

Mordovia
- Proportion: 2:3
- Adopted: 20 May 2008
- Design: A horizontal tricolor of red, white and blue with an eight-pointed red cross.
- Designed by: Andrey Alyoshkin
- Flag of Mordovia (1995–2008)
- Proportion: 1:2
- Adopted: 30 March 1995
- Design: A horizontal tricolor of red, white and blue with an eight-pointed red cross.
- Flag of the Mordovian SSR, then Mordovia (1990–1995)
- Proportion: 1:2
- Adopted: 7 December 1990
- Design: A variant of the Russian SFSR flag with "Mordovian SSR" written in the Russian, Mokshan, and Erzyan languages respectively.

The flag of the Republic of Mordovia in Russia (Note: Russian: Флаг Республики Мордовия; Moksha: Мордовия Республикань флагсь; Erzya: Мордовия Республикань флаг) is a horizontal tricolour of red, white and blue. It is charged with a brown-red sun emblem in the center of the white strip. The emblem is divided into four parts, symbolizing the four Mordvin tribes. Its proportions are 1:2:1.

The flag was adopted on 20 May 2008. The proportions are 2:3.

== Historical flags ==
Flag	Years of use	Ratio	Government	Notes
	1930–1934	1:2	Mordovian Autonomous Oblast	
	1934–1937	1:2	Mordovian ASSR	
	1937–1954	1:2	Mordovian ASSR	
	1954–1990	1:2	Mordovian ASSR	
	1990–1995	1:2	Mordovian SSR (1990–1993)	
	1990–1995	1:2	Mordovia (1993–1995)	
	1995–2008	1:2	Mordovia	
	2008–Present	2:3	Mordovia	

== Other ==
Flag	Years of use	Ratio	Description	Notes
		2:3	Alternative Mordovian flag with an elongated solar symbol.	
	1990s–Present	1:2	Ethnic flag of the Erzya people.	
	2010–Present	1:2	Ethnic flag of the Moksha people.	

== See also ==
- Flag of the Mordovian Autonomous Soviet Socialist Republic
- Auseklis
- Flag of Udmurtia
