= 2003 World Championships in Athletics – Men's 20 kilometres walk =

Video on YouTube Official video

The Men's 20 km Walk at the 2003 World Championships in Paris, France was held on 23 August 2003, with the start at 08.30h local time.

== Medalists ==
Gold	Jefferson Pérez; Ecuador (ECU)
Silver	Paquillo Fernández; Spain (ESP)
Bronze	Roman Rasskazov; Russia (RUS)

== Abbreviations ==
- All times shown are in hours:minutes:seconds

DNS	did not start
NM	no mark
WR	world record
AR	area record
NR	national record
Season Best	personal best
Personal Best	season best

== Records ==
Standing records prior to the 2003 World Athletics Championships
World Record	Paquillo Fernández (ESP)	1:17.22	April 28, 2002	Turku, Finland
Event Record	Maurizio Damilano (ITA)	1:19.37	August 24, 1991	Tokyo, Japan
Broken records during the 2003 World Athletics Championships
World Record	Jefferson Pérez (ECU)	1:17.21	August 23, 2003	Paris, France
Event Record	Jefferson Pérez (ECU)	1:17.21	August 23, 2003	Paris, France

== Intermediates ==
Rank	Number	Athlete	Time
5 KILOMETRES
1	385	Paquillo Fernández (ESP)	19:29
2	366	Jefferson Pérez (ECU)	19:35
3	1159	Vladimir Andreyev (RUS)	19:35
4	1164	Viktor Burayev (RUS)	19:36
5	935	Noé Hernández (MEX)	19:36
10 KILOMETRES
1	385	Paquillo Fernández (ESP)	38:38
2	366	Jefferson Pérez (ECU)	39:10
3	1159	Vladimir Andreyev (RUS)	39:11
4	1181	Roman Rasskazov (RUS)	39:11
5	935	Noé Hernández (MEX)	39:11
15 KILOMETRES
1	385	Paquillo Fernández (ESP)	58:03
2	366	Jefferson Pérez (ECU)	58:19
3	1181	Roman Rasskazov (RUS)	58:34
4	935	Noé Hernández (MEX)	58:38
5	1159	Vladimir Andreyev (RUS)	58:39

== Final ranking ==
Rank	Athlete	Time	Note
1st place, gold medalist(s)	Jefferson Pérez (ECU)	1:17:21	Season Best
2nd place, silver medalist(s)	Paquillo Fernández (ESP)	1:18:00	Season Best
3rd place, bronze medalist(s)	Roman Rasskazov (RUS)	1:18:07	Season Best
4	Noé Hernández (MEX)	1:18:14	Personal Best
5	Luke Adams (AUS)	1:19:35	Personal Best
6	Ivan Trotski (BLR)	1:19:40	Personal Best
7	David Márquez (ESP)	1:19:46	Personal Best
8	Ilya Markov (RUS)	1:20:14	
9	José David Dominguez (ESP)	1:20:15	Personal Best
10	Alejandro López (MEX)	1:20:24	
11	Lorenzo Civallero (ITA)	1:20:34	Personal Best
12	Yevgeniy Misyulya (BLR)	1:20:38	Season Best
13	André Höhne (GER)	1:20:44	Personal Best
14	Hatem Ghoula (TUN)	1:21:12	Season Best
15	Yu Chaohong (CHN)	1:21:18	
16	Michele Didoni (ITA)	1:21:23	Season Best
17	João Vieira (POR)	1:22:07	
18	Kevin Eastler (USA)	1:22:25	Personal Best
19	Erik Tysse (NOR)	1:22:43	Season Best
20	Akinori Matsuzaki (JPN)	1:24:22	
21	Alessandro Gandellini (ITA)	1:24:45	
22	Predrag Filipović (SCG)	1:25:15	
23	Xu Xingde (CHN)	1:25:41	
24	Sérgio Galdino (BRA)	1:26:48	Season Best
25	Feodosiy Chumachenko (MDA)	1:27:27	
26	Benjamin Kuciński (POL)	1:27:41	
27	Jiří Malysa (CZE)	1:30:17	
28	Allan Segura (CRC)	1:30:53	NR
29	Ronald Huayta (BOL)	1:31:15	Personal Best
DISQUALIFIED (DSQ)
—	Toshihito Fujinohara (JPN)	DSQ	
—	Eiichi Yoshizawa (JPN)	DSQ	
—	Julius Sawe (KEN)	DSQ	
—	Vladimir Andreyev (RUS)	DSQ	
—	Valeriy Borisov (KAZ)	DSQ	
—	Bernardo Segura (MEX)	DSQ	
—	Julio René Martínez (GUA)	DSQ	
—	Lee Dae-Ro (KOR)	DSQ	
—	Viktor Burayev (RUS)	DSQ	

== See also ==
- Athletics at the 2003 Pan American Games - Men's 20 kilometres walk
- 2003 Race Walking Year Ranking
