= Mordovian Regional Committee of the Communist Party of the Soviet Union =

The First Secretary of the Mordovian regional branch of the Communist Party of the Soviet Union was the position of highest authority in the Mordovian AO (1930–1934) and the Mordovian ASSR (1934–1991) in the Russian SFSR of the Soviet Union. The position was created in September 1928, and abolished in August 1991. The First Secretary was a de facto appointed position usually by the Politburo or the General Secretary himself.

== List of First Secretaries of the Communist Party of Mordovia ==
| Name | Term of Office | | Life years |
| Name | Start | End | Life years |
First Secretaries of the Communist Party
| Grigory Polumordvinov | September 1928 | November 1929 | 1897–1937 |
| Pavel Pellinen | November 1929 | September 1932 | 1897–1937 |
| Veniamin Gantman | September 1932 | January 1934 | 1891–1937 |
| Mikhail Prusakov | January 1934 | June 7, 1937 | 1896–1938 |
| Vladimir Putnin | June 14, 1937 | July 19, 1937 | 1896–1938 |
| Aleksandr Polyakov (Note: Acting) | July 19, 1937 | September 9, 1937 | 1902–1938 |
| Ivan Kuznetsov (Note: Acting to June 15, 1938) | September 9, 1937 | January 1940 | 1897–1983 |
| Vasily Petushkov | January 1940 | 1945 | 1894–1974 |
| Sergey Kochergin | 1945 | December 1948 | 1899–1959 |
| Ivan Piksin | December 1948 | September 1951 | 1905–1974 |
| Vasily Zakhurdayev | September 1951 | January 1958 | 1903–1974 |
| Georgy Osipov | January 1958 | March 3, 1968 | 1906–1980 |
| Pyotr Elistratov | March 3, 1968 | April 1971 | 1917–1987 |
| Anatoly Beryzin | April 1971 | August 24, 1990 | 1931–1998 |
| Vladimir Sanayev (Note: Acting) | August 24, 1990 | October 27, 1990 | 1932– |
| Viktor Skoptsov | October 27, 1990 | August 1991 | 1939–2009 |

== See also ==
- Mordovian Autonomous Soviet Socialist Republic
