= Komsomolsky, Republic of Mordovia =

Komsomolsky Комсомольский
- Work settlement
- Interactive map of Komsomolsky
- Location of Komsomolsky Komsomolsky (Republic of Mordovia)
- Coordinates: 54°26′N 45°50′E
- Country: Russia
- Federal subject: Mordovia
- Administrative district: Chamzinsky District
- Work SettlementSelsoviet: Komsomolsky Work Settlement
- Founded: 1952

Population (2010 Census)
  - Total: 13,513
  - Estimate (2025): 10,966 (−18.8%)

Administrative status
  - Capital of: Komsomolsky Work Settlement

Municipal status
  - Municipal district: Chamzinsky Municipal District
  - Urban settlement: Komsomolskoye Urban Settlement
  - Capital of: Komsomolskoye Urban Settlement
- Time zone: UTC+3 (MSK)
- Postal codes: 431720, 431722
- OKTMO ID: 89657155051

Komsomolsky population
- 2010 Census: 13,513
- 2002 Census: 14,230
- 1989 Census: 14,740
- 1979 Census: 13,232

Komsomolsky (Russian: Комсомо́льский) is an urban locality (a work settlement) in Chamzinsky District of the Republic of Mordovia, Russia. As of the 2010 Census, its population was 13,513.

== Administrative and municipal status ==
Within the framework of administrative divisions, the work settlement of Komsomolsky is incorporated within Chamzinsky District as Komsomolsky Work Settlement (an administrative division of the district). As a municipal division, Komsomolsky Work Settlement is incorporated within Chamzinsky Municipal District as Komsomolskoye Urban Settlement.
