= Roman Rasskazov =

Russian race walker

Personal information
- Full name: Roman Vladimirovich Rasskazov
- Born: 28 April 1979 (age 47) Kovylkino, Mordvin ASSR, Russian SFSR, Soviet Union
Medal record
Men's athletics
Representing Russia
World Championships
Gold medal – first place	2001 Edmonton	20 km walk
Bronze medal – third place	2003 Paris	20 km walk

Roman Vladimirovich Rasskazov (Russian: Роман Владимирович Рассказов; born 28 April 1979) is a Russian race walker. He was born in Kovylkino, Mordovia.

== International competitions ==
Year	Competition	Venue	Position	Event	Notes
Representing Russia
1998	World Junior Championships	Annecy, France	1st	10,000 m	41:55.95
2000	Olympic Games	Sydney, Australia	6th	20 km	1:20:57
2001	World Championships	Edmonton, Canada	1st	20 km	1:20:31
2001	Goodwill Games	Brisbane, Australia	3rd	20,000 m	1:21:09
2003	World Championships	Paris, France	3rd	20 km	1:18:07

== See also ==
- List of world records in athletics

Records
Preceded by Julio René Martínez	Men's 20km Walk World Record Holder equalled Julio René Martinez record 2000-05-19 – April 28, 2002	Succeeded by Paquillo Fernández
