= Coat of arms of Adjara =

Regional coat of arms

Coat of arms of Adjara

The coat of arms of the Autonomous Republic of Adjara is a shield divided in two by a wavy line. In the center is a red smaller shield of the Lesser Arms of Georgia, bearing a silver horseman (St. George) with a golden halo mounted on a silver horse and slaying a silver dragon with a golden-tipped, silver-shafted spear. The upper sector of the main shield bears a golden fortress on a green field and the lower one contains three golden coins on blue field.

The coat of arms was adopted by the Supreme Council of Adjara in 2008. Its use is regulated by the Constitution of Adjara and the republic's special law.

== History ==
Emblem of the Adjarian Autonomous Soviet Socialist Republic

Versions
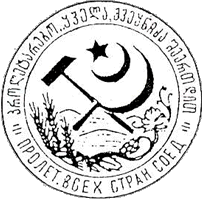
- Emblem used from 14 January 1922 to 25 October 1937.
- Armiger: Adjarian Autonomous Soviet Socialist Republic
- Adopted: 14 January 1922; 25 October 1937
- Motto: პროლეტარებო ყველა ქვეყნისა, შეერთდით! (Georgian) Пролетарии всех стран, соединяйтесь! (Russian) "Workers of the world, unite!"

The First Congress of Soviets of the ASSR of Adjara, which was held from January 10 to January 14, 1922, adopted the first Constitution of the ASSR of Adjara. The print of the constitution in 1922 shows the form of the emblem of the Adjarian ASSR.

=== Second revision ===
In the Constitution of the Adjarian Autonomous Soviet Socialist Republic, adopted on October 25, 1937, by the All-Adjarian Congress of Soviets, the emblem of the Adjarian ASSR was described in Article 111 of the constitution :

The national emblem of the Adjarian Autonomous Soviet Socialist Republic is the state emblem of the Georgian SSR, which consists of a round red field, in the upper part of which there is a luminous five-pointed star with rays extending all over the field, at the bottom is a snowy ridge of blue color; on the right side there are golden ears and on the left, there are golden vines with vines. The ends of the ears and vines are intertwined at the base of the ridge in the lower part of the field. rpa and hammer, which rest: at the top - at a luminous star, at the bottom - at the top of the ridge, and at the sides - at the ears and vines. Around the field there is an inscription in Georgian and Russian: "Proletarians of all countries, unite!" and "Georgian SSR ", with the addition under the inscription "Georgian SSR" in smaller letters of the inscription "Adjarian ASSR" in Georgian and Russian languages. The coat of arms is bordered around with a pattern of ornaments in the Georgian style.

— Constitution of the Adjarian Autonomous Soviet Socialist Republic (1937), Article 111

=== Third revision ===
After the adoption of the new Constitution of the Adjarian ASSR in 1978, the inscription in the Georgian language “Adjarian ASSR” began to be placed against the background of a picture of the mountains.

== Gallery ==
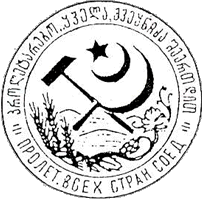
Emblem of the Adjarian ASSR (1922–1937)

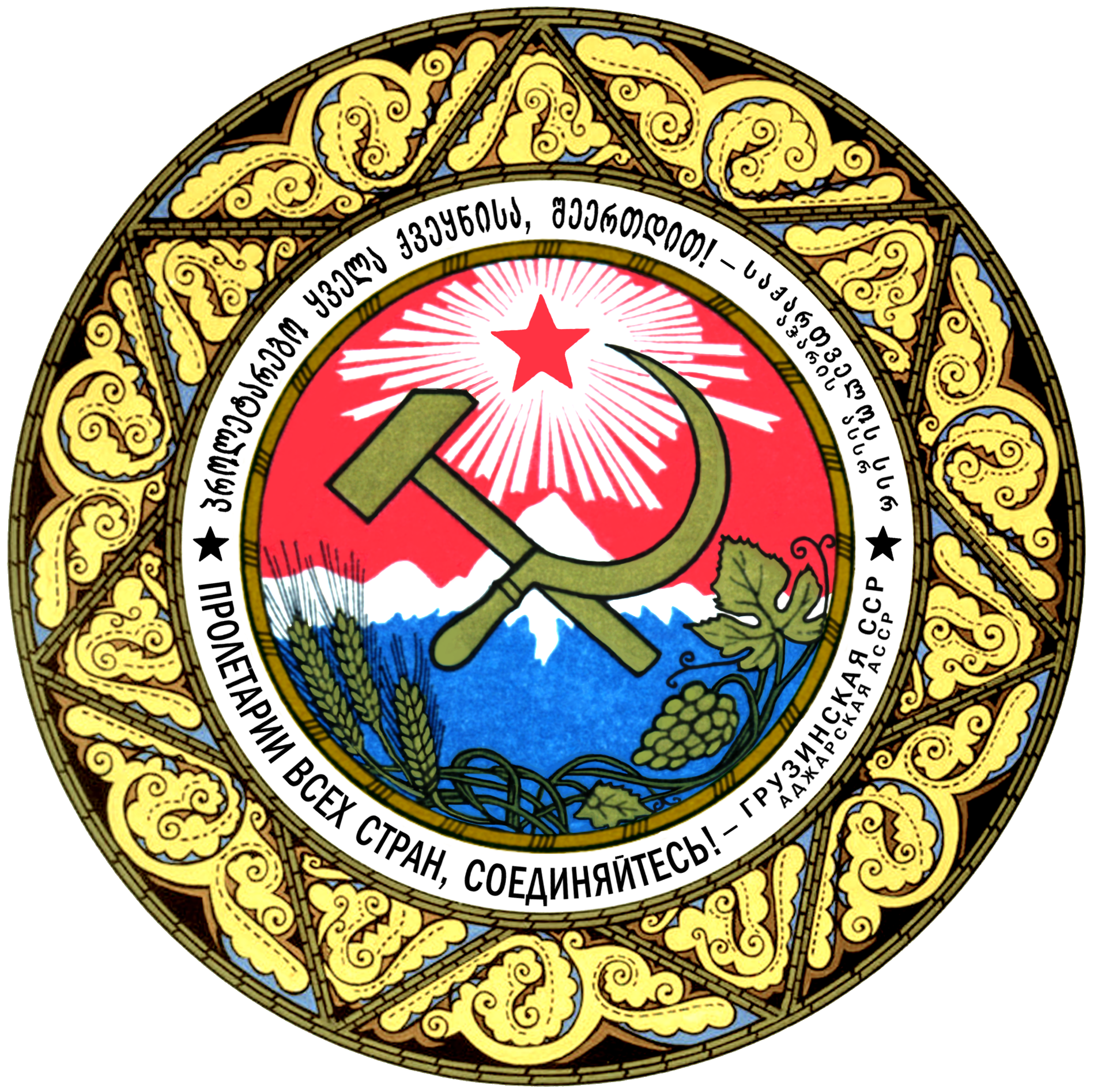
Emblem of the Adjarian ASSR (1937–1978)

Emblem of the Adjarian ASSR (1978–1990) and Adjara under Aslan Abashidze (1990–1991)

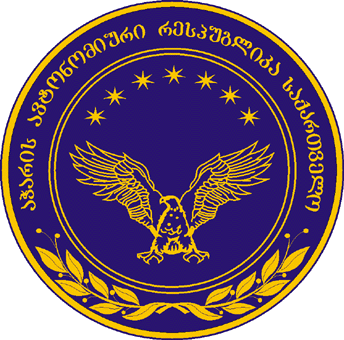
Adjara under Aslan Abashidze (2000–2004)

== See also ==
- Flag of Adjara
