= Chamzinsky District =

Chamzinsky District Чамзинский район (Russian)
- District

Other transcription(s)
  - Erzya: Чаунзабуе
  - Moksha: Чамзинкань аймак
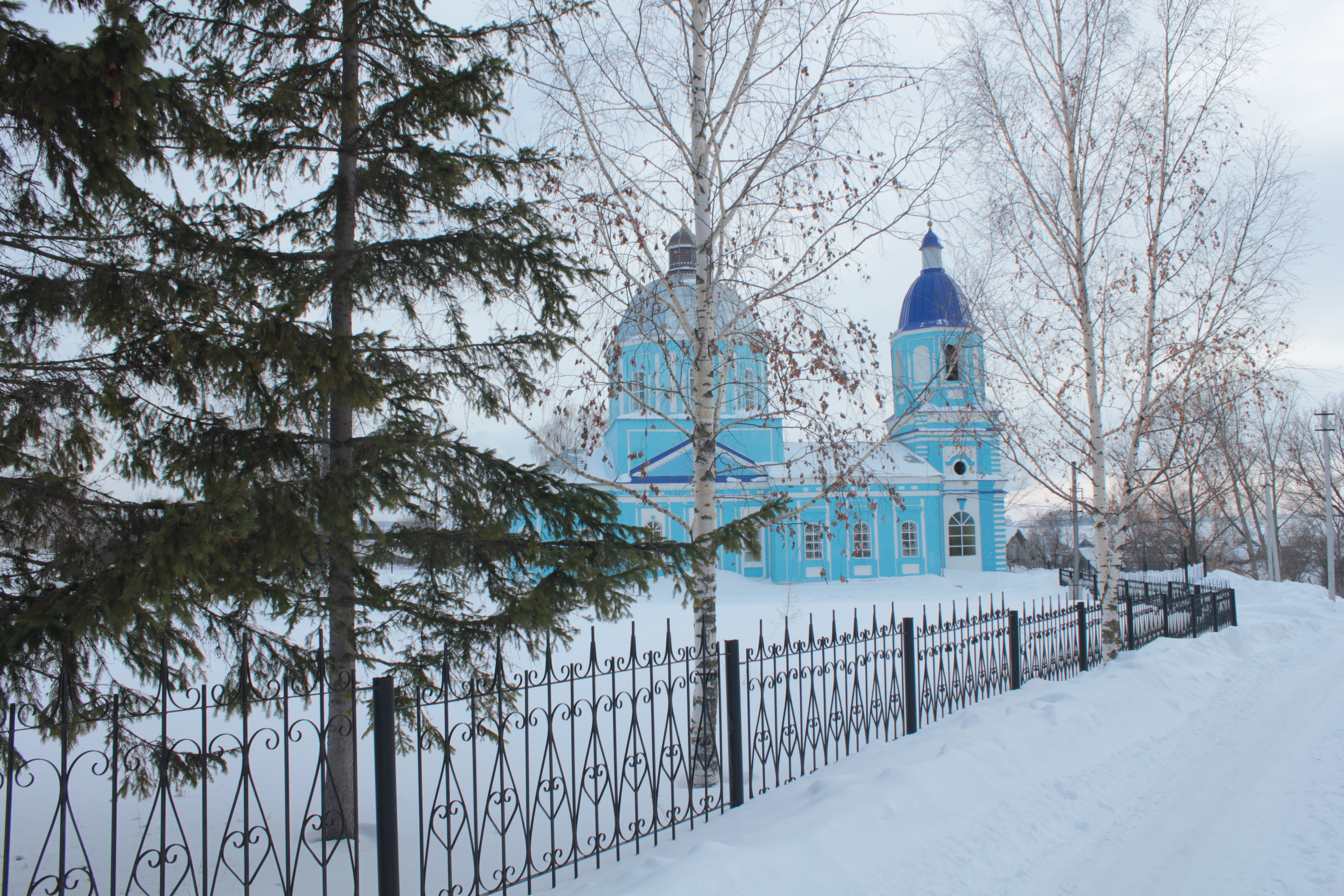
- Church of Three Holy Hierarchs, village Sabur Machkasy, Chamzinsky District

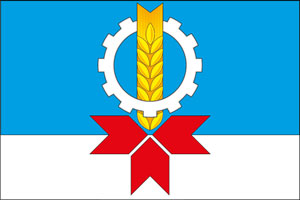
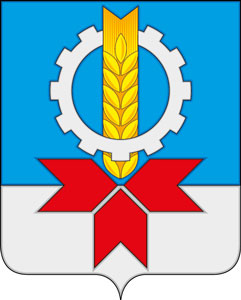
- Flag Coat of arms
- Location of Chamzinsky District in the Republic of Mordovia
- Coordinates: 54°24′N 45°47′E
- Country: Russia
- Federal subject: Republic of Mordovia
- Administrative center: Chamzinka

Area
  - Total: 1,009.5 km^{2} (389.8 sq mi)

Population (2010 Census)
  - Total: 31,639
  - Density: 31.341/km^{2} (81.173/sq mi)
  - Urban: 72.6%
  - Rural: 27.4%

Administrative structure
  - Administrative divisions: 2 Work settlements, 12 Selsoviets
  - Inhabited localities: 2 urban-type settlements, 51 rural localities

Municipal structure
  - Municipally incorporated as: Chamzinsky Municipal District
  - Municipal divisions: 2 urban settlements, 12 rural settlements
- Time zone: UTC+3 (MSK)
- OKTMO ID: 89657000
- Website: http://chamzinka.e-mordovia.ru/

Population of Chamzinsky District
- 2010 Census: 31,639
- 2002 Census: 33,871
- 1989 Census: 36,077
- 1979 Census: 34,888

Chamzinsky District (Russian: Ча́мзинский райо́н; Erzya: Чаунзабуе, Čaunzabuje; Moksha: Чамзинкань аймак, Čamzinkań ajmak) is an administrative and municipal district (raion), one of the twenty-two in the Republic of Mordovia, Russia. It is located in the east of the republic. The area of the district is 1,009.5 square kilometers (389.8 sq mi). Its administrative center is the urban locality (a work settlement) of Chamzinka. As of the 2010 Census, the total population of the district was 31,639, with the population of Chamzinka accounting for 29.9% of that number.

== Administrative and municipal status ==
Within the framework of administrative divisions, Chamzinsky District is one of the twenty-two in the republic. It is divided into two work settlements (administrative divisions with the administrative centers in the work settlements (inhabited localities) of Chamzinka and Komsomolsky) and twelve selsoviets, all of which comprise fifty-one rural localities. As a municipal division, the district is incorporated as Chamzinsky Municipal District. Chamzinka and Komsomolsky Work Settlements are incorporated into two urban settlements, and the twelve selsoviets are incorporated into twelve rural settlements within the municipal district. The work settlement of Chamzinka serves as the administrative center of both the administrative and municipal district.

== Notable residents ==
- Maksim Budnikov (born 1983 in Chamzinska), footballer
- Sergius (Chashin) (born 1974 in Komsomolsky), Russian Orthodox bishop
