= Coat of arms of Dagestan =

Emblem of the Republic of Dagestan
- Armiger: Sergey Melikov, Head of the Republic of Dagestan
- Adopted: 1994

The coat of arms of Dagestan (Russian: Герб Дагестана, Avar: Дагъистаналъул герб, Azerbaijani: Дағыстанын ҝерби, romanized: Dağıstanın gerbi, Lezgian: Дагъустандин герб) was instituted on 20 October 1994. The eagle is a traditional symbol of nobility, courage, wisdom, and faith.

== History ==
Emblem of the Dagestan Autonomous Soviet Socialist Republic
- Armiger: Dagestan Autonomous Soviet Socialist Republic
- Adopted: 14 March 1937
- Crest: Red star
- Supporters: Wheat and Cotton
- Motto: 1936 version: Пролетарии всех стран, соединяйтесь! (Russian) Киналго улкабазул пролетарал, цолъе нуж! (Avar) "Workers of the world, unite!"; 1978 version: Пролетарии всех стран, соединяйтесь! (Russian) Киналго улкабазул пролетарал, цолъе нуж! (Avar) Бүтүн өлкәләрин пролетарлары, бирләшин! (Azerbaijani) Массо а мехкийн пролетареш, цхьанакхета! (Chechen) "Workers of the world, unite!"

=== First version ===
On December 7, 1921, the First All-Dagestani Congress of Soviets adopted the Constitution of the Dagestan ASSR. According to this document, the emblem of the Dagestan ASSR was an image in the rays of the sun crossed golden sickle and hammer with arms downward, surrounded by a crown of ears, all this was accompanied by the inscription: "Dagestan Autonomous Socialist Soviet Republic" and "Proletarians of all countries, unite!"

=== Proposed emblem ===
In 1926, a proposed emblem was created. The design of the emblem included a mountain range. This project was rejected.

=== Second version ===
On April 5, 1927, the 6th All-Dagestani Congress of Soviets adopted the Constitution of the Dagestan ASSR, which approved the emblem of the republic.

It consisted of the image of the sun rising over a snowy ridge, against the background of the mountains were placed criss-cross sickle and hammer, under which were depicted a vine, corn and wheat ears; on the sides are drawn rocks. All this was in the middle of the silver gear, the inner circle of which was the motto "Workers of all countries, unite!" in Russian and Turkic languages. The name of the republic was written in gold letters on the gear oval: "The Dagestan Autonomous Soviet Socialist Republic". The inscriptions were performed in Latin and Arabic fonts.

=== Third version ===
From 1936, the emblem of Dagestan ASSR became similar to the emblem of the RSFSR. The only difference was in the motto, which in the Dagestan emblem was cited in 10 languages: Russian, Avar, Kumyk, Dargin, Lezgin, Turkic, Nogai, Lak, Tat, Tabasaran.

The emblem was reconfirmed on June 12, 1937, in the 11th All-Dagestani of Soviets, which adopted the Constitution of the Dagestan ASSR (approved at the III session of the Supreme Soviet of the RSFSR in 1940).

==== First revision ====
In 1938, the Turkic and Nogai inscription was replaced by Azerbaijani inscription.

==== Second revision ====
In February 1938, the scripts of the language of Dagestan was standardized to Cyrillic script. The inscriptions now look like :

Lezgin: Вири уьлквейрин пролетарар, сад хьухь! (Viri ylkvejrin proletarar, sad ҳuҳ!)	Lak: Циняв билаятирттал пролетартал, цахьиярд! (Ꞩinjav bilajatirttal proletartal, ꞩaҳijard!)
Dargin: Лерилра улкнала пролетарийти, цадиирая! (Lerilra ulknala proletariyti, ꞩadiiraja!)	Azerbaijani: Бүтүн өлкәләрин пролетарлары, бирләшин! (Bytyn ɵlkələrin proletarlarь, ʙirləşin!)
Kumyk: Бары да уьлкелени пролетарлары, бирлешигиз! (Barь da ylkeleni proletarlarь, birleꞩigiz!)	Tabasaran: Вари уьлкйирин пролетарар, саб йихьай! (Vari ylkjirin proletarar, sab jixaj!)
Avar: Киналго улкабазул пролетарал, цолъе нуж! (Kinalgo ulkabazul proletaral, ꞩoļe nuƶ!)	Tat: Пролетарьой гьеме билеетгьо, ек бошти! (Proletaroj heme bileetho, ek boşti!)
Russian: Пролетарии всех стран, соединяйтесь! (Proletarii vsekh stran, soyedinyaytes′!)

==== Third revision ====
On May 30, 1978, the 8th session of the Supreme Council of the Dagestan ASSR of the 9th convocation adopted a new Constitution. The languages of the inscriptions were added, there were 11 of them: Russian, Avar, Azerbaijani, Dargin, Kumyk, Lak, Lezgin, Nogai, Tabasaran, Tat and Chechen.

Chechen: Массо а мехкийн пролетареш, цхьанакхета! (Masso a mekhkiyn proletaresh, tskh'anakkheta!)	Nogai: Баьри де эллердинг пролетарлары, бирлесиньиз! (Bäri de ellerding proletarları, birlesiñiz!)
Tabasaran: Вари уьлкйирин пролетарар, саб йихьай! (Wari ülkyirin proletarar, sab yixay!)	Tat: Пролетарьой гьеме билеетгьо, ек бошти! (Proletar'oy heme bilejetho, ek boşti!)
Lak: Циняв билаятирттал пролетартал, цахьиярд! (Tsinyav bilayatirttal proletartal, tsaxʻiyard!)	Lezgin: Вири уьлквейрин пролетарар, сад хьухь! (Viri uʻlkveyrin proletarar, sad xʻuxʻ!)
Dargin: Лерилра улкнала пролетарийти, цадиирая! (Lerilra ulknala proletariyti, tsadiiraya!)	Kumyk: Бары да уьлкелени пролетарлары, бирлешигиз! (Barı da ülkeleni proletarları, birleşigiz!)
Avar: Киналго улкабазул пролетарал, цолъе нуж! (Kinalgo ulkabazul proletaral, tsol'ye nuzh!)	Azerbaijani: Бүтүн өлкәләрин пролетарлары, бирләшин! (Bütün ölkələrin proletarları, birləşin!)
Russian: Пролетарии всех стран, соединяйтесь! (Proletarii vsekh stran, soyedinyaytes′!)

== Gallery ==
Emblem of the Dagestan ASSR (1936–1978)

Emblem of the Dagestan ASSR (1978–1991), the Dagestan SSR (1991–1992) and the Republic of Dagestan (1992–1994)

== See also ==
- Flag of Dagestan

== Sources ==
- Dagestan: Edward Beliaev, Oksana Buranbaeva. Cavendish State Publishing 2005 ISBN 9780761420156 (Google Books)
