= Chamzinka, Chamzinsky District, Republic of Mordovia =

Chamzinka Чамзинка
- Work settlement

Other transcription(s)
  - Erzya: Чаунза
- Interactive map of Chamzinka
- Location of Chamzinka Chamzinka (Republic of Mordovia)
- Coordinates: 54°24′N 45°47′E
- Country: Russia
- Federal subject: Mordovia
- Administrative district: Chamzinsky District
- Work SettlementSelsoviet: Chamzinka Work Settlement
- Founded: 1624
- Urban-type settlement status since: 1960

Population (2010 Census)
  - Total: 9,463
  - Estimate (2025): 9,139 (−3.4%)

Administrative status
  - Capital of: Chamzinsky District, Chamzinka Work Settlement

Municipal status
  - Municipal district: Chamzinsky Municipal District
  - Urban settlement: Chamzinka Urban Settlement
  - Capital of: Chamzinsky Municipal District, Chamzinka Urban Settlement
- Time zone: UTC+3 (MSK)
- Postal codes: 431700, 431702, 431815
- OKTMO ID: 89657151051

Chamzinka population
- 2010 Census: 9,463
- 2002 Census: 9,906
- 1989 Census: 9,845
- 1979 Census: 6,548

Chamzinka (Russian: Ча́мзинка; Erzya: Чаунза, Čaunza) is an urban locality (a work settlement) and the administrative center of Chamzinsky District of the Republic of Mordovia, Russia. As of the 2010 Census, its population was 9,463.

== History ==
It was founded in 1624; urban-type settlement status was granted to it in 1960.

== Administrative and municipal status ==
Within the framework of administrative divisions, Chamzinka serves as the administrative center of Chamzinsky District. As an administrative division, the work settlement of Chamzinka, together with two rural localities, is incorporated within Chamzinsky District as Chamzinka Work Settlement. As a municipal division, Chamzinka Work Settlement is incorporated within Chamzinsky Municipal District as Chamzinka Urban Settlement.
