= Coat of arms of Chuvashia =

Emblem of the Chuvash Autonomous Soviet Socialist Republic
- Armiger: Chuvash Autonomous Soviet Socialist Republic
- Adopted: 18 July 1937
- Crest: Red star
- Supporters: Wheat and Cotton
- Motto: Пролетарии всех стран, соединяйтесь! (Russian) Пӗтӗм тӗнчери пролетарисем, пӗрлешӗр! (Chuvash) "Workers of the world, unite!"

The national emblem of the Chuvash Autonomous Soviet Socialist Republic was adopted in 1937 by the government of the Chuvash Autonomous Soviet Socialist Republic. The emblem is identical to the emblem of the Russian Soviet Federative Socialist Republic.

== History ==
=== First version ===
The first emblem of the Chuvash ASSR was identical to the emblem of the Russian SFSR. The differences were only in the inscription.

=== Second version ===
In the Constitution of the Chuvash Empire, adopted on January 31, 1926, stipulated that the republic may have a coat of arms and a flag. On February 25, 1926, at a meeting of the Presidium of the Central Executive Committee of the Chuvash ASSR, a commission was formed to develop the emblem and the flag of the republic. A contest for the best design of the coat of arms was organized. After finalizing the drafts at a meeting on December 10, 1926, the commission decided to adopt the coat of arms of Chuvashia with the following description:

The State Emblem of the Chuvash Autonomous Soviet Socialist Republic consists of images in the sun's rays of a sickle and hammer, crisscrossed, with handles down, surrounded by a wreath consisting of ears on the right side and oak and spruce branches on the left side, with a red border with Chuvash ornamentation at the ends and with an inscription in the middle: "петем тенчери пролетарисем, перлешер!" An ancient Chuvashian five-pointed star is placed above the sickle and hammer: "Чавашсен Автономла Сотсиа-лисампа Совет Респуплеке" and "Р.С.Ф С.Р."

— Constitution of the Chuvash ASSR (1926)

The emblem was designed by the artist and photographer P.E. Martens, a graduate of the Baron Stieglitz Institute (now Academy of Applied Arts).

==== First revision ====
By decree of the Presidium of the CEC of the Chuvash ASSR on January 3, 1927, the state coat of arms of the Chuvash ASSR was adopted with some changes: the background of the emblem became red, the sickle, the hammer, the stars and the rays - golden. The inscription "ЧССР" was represented in two languages: on the left - "Тавашсен Автономла Сотсиалисампа Council Респуплеке", and on the right - "Чувашская Автономная Социалистическая Советская Республика". The initials "Р.С.Ф.С.Р." were placed below.

The 2nd (7th) Congress of Soviets of the Chuvash Autonomous Socialist Soviet Republic finally approved the coat of arms which was created in 1927, adopting the Resolution "On the State Coat of Arms of the Chuvash ASSR" on March 30, 1927. This decree established the following description of the emblem:

The emblem consists of images on a red background in the golden rays of the sun of a golden sickle and hammer, located crisscrossed with handles down, surrounded by a wreath consisting of ears on the right side and oak and spruce branches on the left side, from below with a ribbon with a red border with Chuvash ornamentation on the ends and with an inscription in the middle: "Пeтeм тeнчери пролеттарисем, пeрлешeр!" A golden five-pointed star is placed over the sickle and hammer, and on the left side there is the inscription: "Чaвашсен Автономлa Сотсиалисaмпа Совет Респуплeкe", on the right side:" Чувашская Автономная Социалистическая Советская Республика" and below, between the above inscriptions, the initials: "РСФСР".

— On the State Emblem of the Chuvash ASSR (1927

==== Second revision ====
On February 12, 1931, the IV (IX) Congress of Soviets of the Chuvash Autonomous Soviet Socialist Republic corrected the images of the coat of arms and the flag, adopting the decree "On the State Emblem and the Flag of the Chuvash Autonomous Soviet Socialist Republic". Decorative elements in the form of the Chuvash national ornament were removed from the official symbols of the state due to "not reflecting the correct national policy of the proletarian state". A new description of the emblem was as:

The emblem consists of images on a red background in the golden rays of the sun, a golden sickle and a hammer, located crisscrossed with handles downward, surrounded by a wreath consisting of ears on the right side and oak and fir branches on the left side, interwoven with a red ribbon with an inscription in the middle : "Пeтeм тeнчери пролетарисем, пeрлешeр!" A golden five-pointed star is placed over the sickle and hammer: on the left side there is an inscription on the left: "Чaвашсен Автономлa Социалисaмпа Совет Респуплeкe", on the right side - "Чувашская Автономная Советская Социалистическая Республика" and below, between the above inscriptions, the initials of "РСФСР".

— On the State Emblem and the Flag of the Chuvash Autonomous Soviet Socialist Republic (1931)

=== Third version ===
July 18, 1938, the Chuvash ASSR adopted a new "Stalinist" Constitution of the Chuvash Autonomous Soviet Socialist Republic. According to the text of the Constitution, the coat of arms of the Chuvash ASSR was the emblem of the RSFSR with some inscriptions in Chuvash style. The official blazon for the emblem from the Constitution of 1938:

The state emblem of the Chuvash Autonomous Soviet Socialist Republic is the state emblem of the RSFSR, which consists of an image of a gold sickle and hammer, placed crisscrossed, on a red background in the rays of the sun and framed with ears of wheat, with the inscription "RSFSR" and "Workers of all countries, unite!" in Russian and Chuvash languages, with the inscription "Chuvashskaya A" written under the inscription "RSFSR" CP "in Russian and Chuvash"

— Constitution of the Chuvash Autonomous Soviet Socialist Republic (1938), Article 111

==== First revision ====
The extraordinary VIII session of the 9th Supreme Soviet of the Chuvash ASSR on May 31, 1978 approved a new Constitution of the Chuvash Autonomous Soviet Socialist Republic. The symbols of the republic, the coat of arms and the flag, were described in the Article 157 and 158. In general, the coat of arms and the flag remained the same, but with some minor changes.

The State Emblem of the Chuvash Autonomous Soviet Socialist Republic is the State Emblem of the RSFSR, which is an image of a sickle and a hammer against a red background, in the sun and framed with ears, inscribed "РСФСР "on Russian and "Proletarians of all countries, unite!" in Russian and Chuvash languages with the addition of "Чувашская АССР" inscriptions under the inscription "РСФСР". The top of the emblem is a five-pointed star.

— Constitution of the Chuvash Autonomous Soviet Socialist Republic (1978), Article 157

== Gallery ==
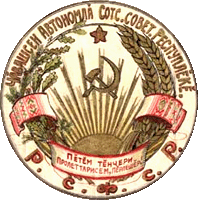
Emblem of the Chuvash ASSR (1926–1927)

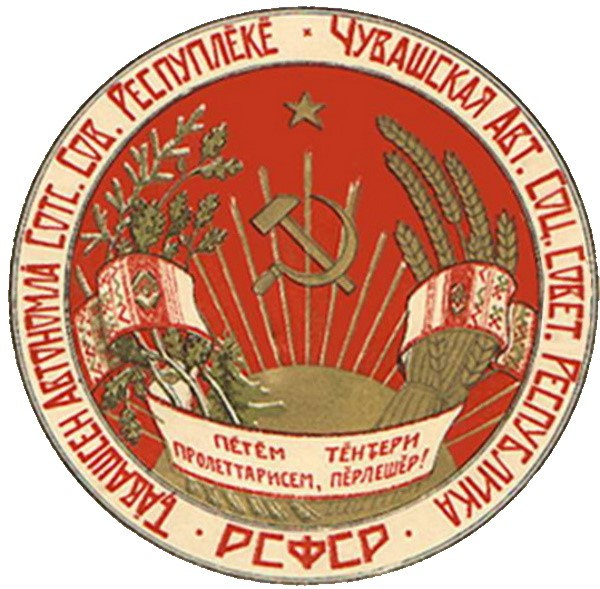
Emblem of the Chuvash ASSR (1927–1931)

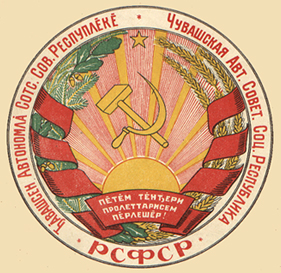
Emblem of the Chuvash ASSR (1931–1937)

Emblem of the Chuvash ASSR (1937–1978)

Emblem of the Chuvash ASSR (1978–1990), the Chuvash SSR (24 October 1990–13 February 1992) and the Chuvash Republic (13 February–29 April 1992)
