= Coat of arms of Mordovia =

Coat of arms of the Republic of Mordovia
- Armiger: Mordovia
- Adopted: 30 March 1995
- Crest: Red octagram
- Supporters: Wheat, neck ring
- Designer: Nikolay Chikrinyov

The coat of arms of the Republic of Mordovia was adopted in 1995 by the government of the Republic of Mordovia, Russia. It is based on the earlier emblem of the Mordovian Autonomous Soviet Socialist Republic.

== Description ==
The coat of arms of Mordovia is a heraldic shield of dark red, white and dark blue with the coat of arms of Saransk in the middle (inescutcheon), supported by: golden ears of wheat, intertwined with a red-white-blue ribbon; a golden grivna (torc, neck ring), on which there are seven ornaments indicating the number of cities in Mordovia; and a red octagram.

== History ==
=== First version ===
The First Congress of Soviets of the Mordovian ASSR approved the state emblem of the republic on its resolution of December 27, 1934. According to the text of the decree "On the State Emblem and the State Flag of the Mordovian SSR":

To approve the Coat of Arms of the Mordovian Autonomous Soviet Socialist Republic, consisting of images on a red background in the golden rays of the sun, golden sickle and hammer, located crosswise with the arms downwards, surrounded by a wreath of wheat ears on the left side and spruce and hemp branches on the right side, intertwined with red a ribbon with an inscription on the ribbon on the left side: “Весе масторонь пролетарийтне пурнаводо вейс", on the right side: “Сембе масторонь пролетарийтне, пуромода марс”, in the rays of the sun above hammer and sickle: "Пролетарии всех стран, соединяйтесь" Above this inscription placed a gold five-pointed star with the inscription around it-Р.С.Ф.С.Р. Around the banner is an inscription on the left side: “Мокшо-эрьзянь Автономной Советской Социалистической Республика", on the right side — "Мордовская Автономная Советская Социалистическая Республика", below, in a bunch of ears of wheat, twigs, spruce and hemp initials "М.А.С.С.Р."

— On the State Emblem and the State Flag of the Mordovian ASSR (1934), Article 1

=== Second version ===
On August 30, 1937, at the Extraordinary 2nd Congress of Soviets of the Republic, there was the adoption the new Constitution of the Mordovian ASSR. The coat of arms repeated the emblem of the RSFSR. The difference is only at the inscriptions: "Мордовская АССР. Мордовскяй АССР. Мордовской АССР" and the Mordvin language (Moksha and Erzya) motto: "Сембе масторонь, пролетариятие, пуромода марс!" and "Весе мастортнень пролетарийтне, пурнаводо вейс!". In the Constitution, the arms were described in Article 110:

The state emblem of the Mordovian Autonomous Soviet Socialist Republic is the state emblem of the RSFSR, which consists of an image of a gold sickle and a hammer, placed criss-crossed, with handles down, on a red background in the sun and framed with ears, inscribed "РСФСР" ("RSFSR") and "Пролетарии всех стран, соединяйтесь" (Proletarians of all countries, unite!) in Russian and Mordovian (Moksha and Erzyan) languages, with the inscription "Mordovian ASSR" in Russian and Mordovian in smaller letters under the inscription "RSFSR".

— Constitution of the Mordovian ASSR (1937), Article 110

==== First revision ====
The Extraordinary IX session of the Supreme Council of the 9th Mordovian ASSR Supreme Soviet on May 30, 1978 adopted a new Constitution of the republic. The description of the emblem was amended, with a red star added. The text of the motto in the Mordvin languages was as follows: "Сембе масторонь пролетариятне, пуромода марс!" and "Весе масторонь пролетарийть, вейсэндяводо!"

The state emblem of the Mordovian Autonomous Soviet Socialist Republic is the state emblem of the RSFSR, representing the sickle and hammer on a red background, in the rays of the sun and framed by ears, with the inscription: "РСФСР" in Russian and "Workers of the world, unite!" in Russian and Mordovian (Moksha and Erzya) with the addition under the inscription "РСФСР" in smaller letters the inscription "Mordovian SSR" in Russian and Mordovian (Moksha and Erzya). At the top of the coat of arms is a five-pointed star.

— Constitution of the Mordovian ASSR (1978), Article 157

== Gallery ==
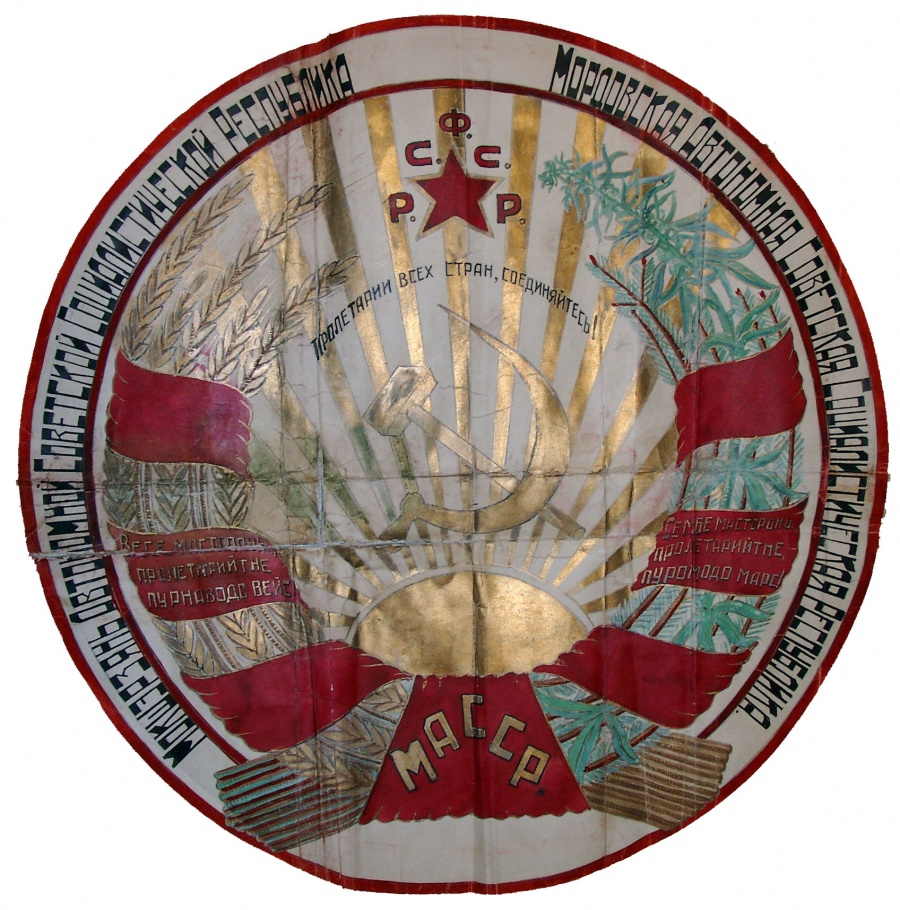
Emblem of the Mordovian ASSR (1934–1937)

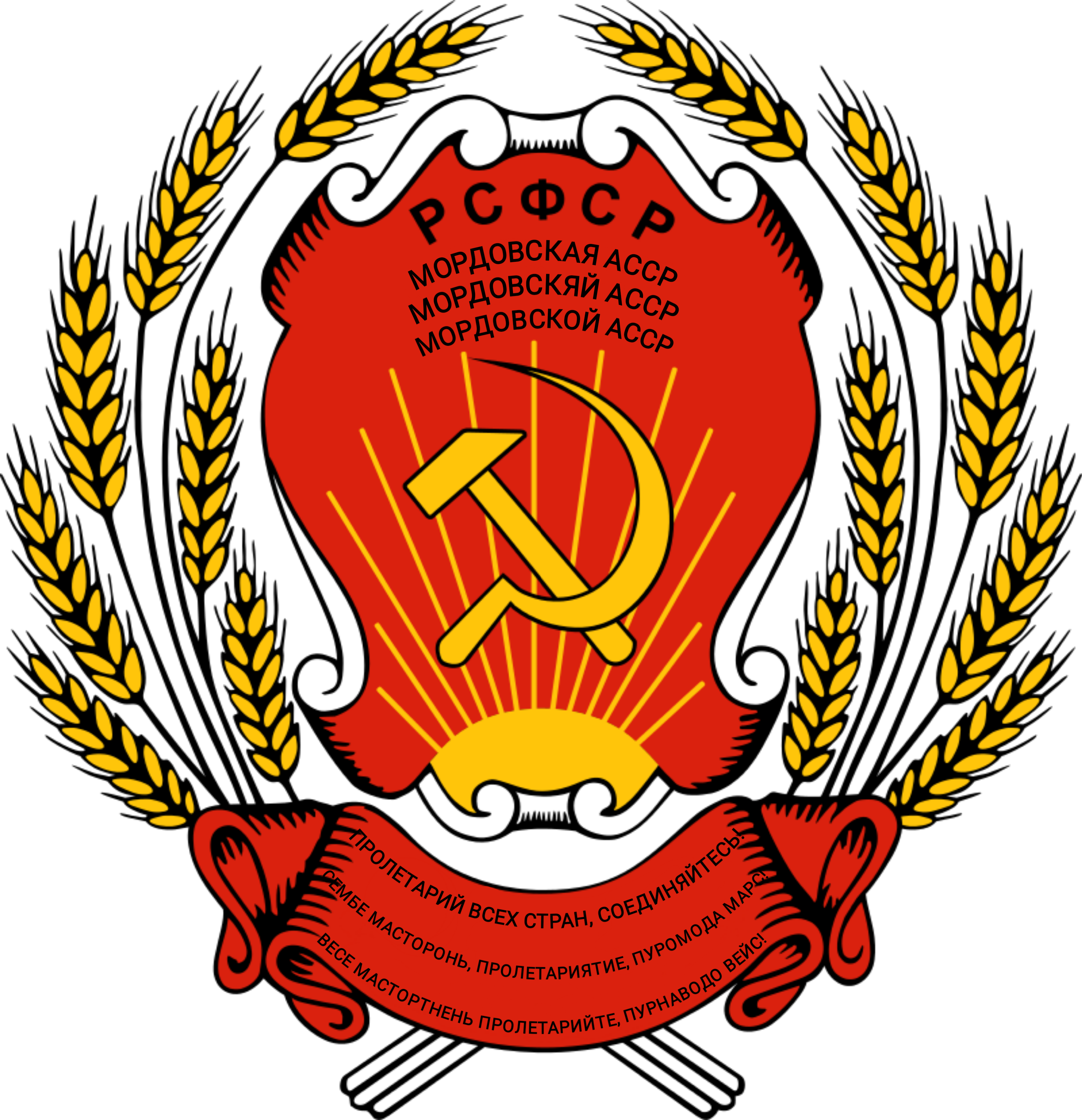
Emblem of the Mordovian ASSR (1937–1978)

Emblem of the Mordovian ASSR (1978–1990), the Mordovian SSR (1990–1993) and the Republic of Mordovia (1993–1995)

== See also ==
- Flag of Mordovia
