= Chuvash national symbols =

Chuvash national symbols - spiritual symbols of ancient Chuvash, are valuable historical and cultural heritage of Chuvashia. Symbols are used in national ornaments of embroidery, jewelry, artwork, etc.

== Main pictographic symbols ==
Symbol	Value	Symbol	Value
	Sun, harmony		Light, heat, fire, energy of life
	Were and will, the greatness of the genus		Cohesion
	Brotherly assistance, solidarity		Honor, will, self-control
	Spiritual and ancestral connection		Rook of life, talent, success, destiny, rock
	The eye of God, heaven, Peace, spiritual enlightenment		Truth, law, humanism, justice
	The universe, unity, Requiem		The tree, the place of the ritual, the appeal to nature
	Amulet from evil, anger, kindness, endurance		Competition, confrontation, light and darkness
	Agreement, reconciliation		Peace, Union, harmony
	Honor, courage, duty, loyalty		The firmament, the universe
	Sky-to-Earth connection		The conquest of the peaks, the upward tendency
	The motion, evolution		Thought, knowledge
	Memory of the past, think of the future		Shield, amulet of unity, anthem
	Care for your neighbor		Reliability, hand in hand
	Home, shelter, home shelter		Creation, call of help
	Charity, help — "Neema"		Spiritual rise, conscience, will
	Diligence, patience, resilience		Exchange, Council, dialogue
	Children of the same mother, family, descendants of the same family		The increase of the family, clan
	Rapport		He and She, love, mutual respect
	Humanity, mind, strength, health, spiritual beauty		Relatives, relatives, community, mutual aid
	The continuation of the family, strong family		The connection with my homeland, devotion
	Friendship, common cause, support, trust		Friendship, common cause, support, trust
	National dignity, self-awareness		Equality, understanding and acceptance
	Caring for children, youth, care, mercy		Close-knit relatives, friendship
	The family hearth, coziness, kindness		Each for friend, family
	Loyalty, unity, love		The power of family, the spirit of the nation, the vitality
	Field corn, the sower of the good		Between fields, section
	A measure of length, divorce owner		Age, period, flow of time
	The measure of sins and kindness		Good and evil, life and death
	The life path, the way		

== The colors in the Chuvash ornament ==
- Red - the color of life, courage, love
- White - the color of truth, purity, wisdom
- Black - the color of agriculture and death
- Green - the color of nature
- Blue - the color of the sky
- Yellow - the color of the sun

The main colors of ornaments are white, red and black.

== Literature ==
- Ф.В. Искендеров, И.Ф. Искендеров, Е.Ф. Костина Азбука чувашских орнаментов и эмблем. — перераб. и доп. издание, Ulyanovsk,: 2008.

== See also ==
- Chuvash embroidery

== Links ==
- Modern interpretation of the Chuvash characters
- The alphabet of the Chuvash ornaments and emblems
