= Sergey Morozov (race walker) =

Russian racewalker (born 1988)

Personal information
- Born: 21 March 1988 (age 38) Saransk, Russia

Sport
- Country: Russia
- Sport: Men's athletics
Medal record
World Youth Championships
Gold medal – first place	2005 Marrakesh	10,000 m walk
European Junior Championships
Gold medal – first place	2007 Hengelo	10,000 m walk

Sergey Morozov (born 21 March 1988) is a Russian race walker who competes in the 20 kilometres walk. He was the 2005 World Youth and 2007 European Junior champion in the 10,000 m walk, then walked a world's fastest time of 1:16:43 hours to win the 2008 Russian 20 km title. He was banned that year after testing positive for EPO.

He returned to competition in 2010 and represented Russia at the 2011 World Championships in Athletics.

He was banned for life in December 2012 after being caught doping for a second time, and all results since 25 February 2011 were annulled. He and more than two dozen other prominent Russian walkers banned for doping were all coached by Viktor Chegin.

== Career ==
Born in Saransk, he won the 10 km youth section of the 2005 Russian Winter Walking Championships, then came a close second to Vladimir Akhmetov at the national junior championships. He and Akhmetov duelled at the 2005 World Youth Championships in Athletics and Morozov came out on top to win the world youth title over 10,000 m. The following year, he won the national junior winter title then won the junior race at the 2006 IAAF World Race Walking Cup. He was the leader early on at the 2006 World Junior Championships in Athletics, but collapsed mid-race and did not finish. In 2007 he had a series of wins over the 10K distance: he won the Russian junior winter title, then the 2007 European Race Walking Cup junior title, culminating in a gold medal at the 2007 European Athletics Junior Championships. He made his senior debut in September at the IAAF Race Walking Challenge Final in his native Saransk, but was disqualified for lifting.

Stepping up to the senior 20 km distance, he competed at the Russian Winter Championships, but was again disqualified. However, he went on to win the Russian title in Saransk in June with a world record of 1:16:43 hours, although this mark was never ratified as a record because no doping control was taken at the competition. He was among the favoured athletes for the 2008 Olympic title but he was suspended after a positive test for erythropoietin (EPO) and was given a two-year ban from the sport, lasting until September 2010.

In his first full season after his doping ban, he returned to the top level of competition. He was runner-up to Vladimir Kanaykin at the Russian Winter Championships. He performed poorly at the 2011 European Race Walking Cup, coming 13th in a time of 1:26:44 hours, but he gained selection for the 2011 World Championships in Athletics after winning the Russian 20 km title in a time of 1:19:18 hours. Despite entering the competition as Russian champion, he was the slowest of the four Russian representatives at the World Championships and he finished in twelfth place.

Morozov opened 2012 with a second-place finish behind Andrei Ruzavin at the Russian Winter Championships.

== See also ==
- List of doping cases in athletics
- Russia at the World Athletics Championships
- Doping at the World Athletics Championships
