= Adjarian Autonomous Soviet Socialist Republic =

Autonomous republic within the Georgian SSR

Coordinates: 41.6500°N 42.0000°E

Adjarian Autonomous Soviet Socialist Republic აჭარის ავტონომიური საბჭოთა სოციალისტური რესპუბლიკა (Georgian) Аджарская Автономная Советская Социалистическая Республика (Russian)
- ASSR of the Georgian SSR
- 1921–1990
- Flag (1978–1990) Emblem (1978–1990)

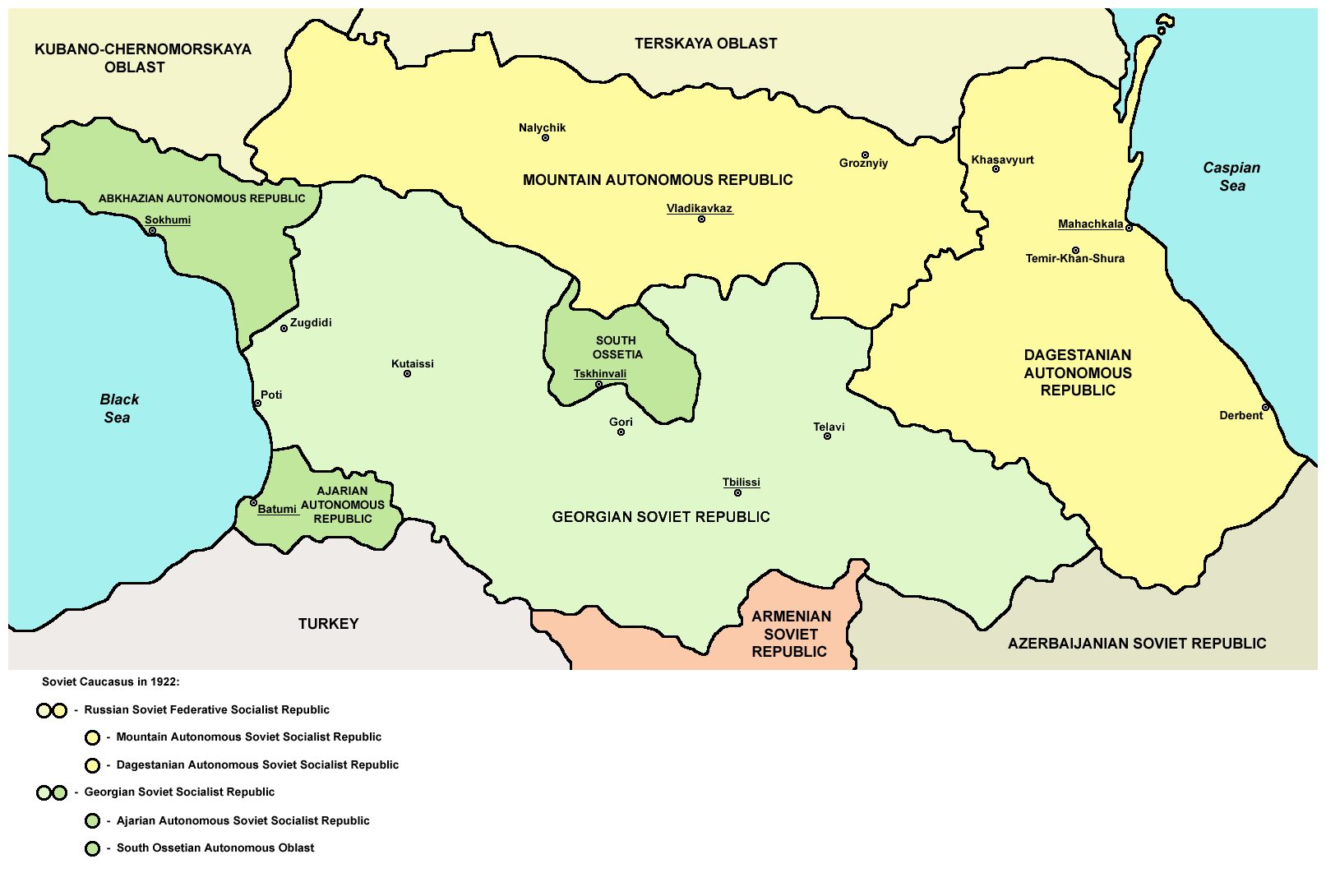
- Map of the Adjarian Autonomous Soviet Socialist Republic in 1922.
- Capital: Batumi
  - Type: Autonomous Soviet Socialist Republic
- History
  - Established: 1921
  - Disestablished: 1990
Preceded by	Succeeded by
Democratic Republic of Georgia	Adjara

The Adjarian Autonomous Soviet Socialist Republic (Adjarian ASSR or Adzhar ASSR; Georgian: აჭარის ავტონომიური საბჭოთა სოციალისტური რესპუბლიკა, romanized: ach'aris avt'onomiuri sabch'ota sotsialist'uri resp'ublik'a; Russian: Аджарская Автономная Советская Социалистическая Республика, romanized: Adzharskaya Avtonomnaya Sovetskaya Sotsialisticheskaya Respublika) was an autonomous republic of the Soviet Union within the Georgian SSR, established on 16 July 1921. On 10 December 1990, it was renamed into the Autonomous Republic of Adjara. After the dissolution of the Soviet Union in 1991, it became part of the independent Georgia.

== Establishment ==
After a temporary occupation by Turkish and British troops in 1918–1920, Ajaria was reunited with Georgia in 1920. A brief military conflict in March 1921 prompted the government in Ankara to cede the territory to Georgia as a consequence of Article VI of the Treaty of Kars, with the condition for autonomy to be provided for the Muslim population. Accordingly, the Soviet Union established the Adjarian Autonomous Soviet Socialist Republic on 16 July 1921. Nonetheless, Islam within the new republic, as elsewhere in the Soviet Union and in common with Christianity, was persecuted and repressed.

== See also ==
- Adjarian Regional Committee of the Communist Party of Georgia
