= Mordovian Okrug =

The Mordovian Okrug (Russian: Мордовский округ) was an okrug (an administrative unit) in the Soviet Union created to establish the autonomy for Mordovians. It was founded on 16 July 1928 with center in Saransk.

== History ==
It was based on the areas of Penza and Simbirsk Governorates of RSFSR with significant Mordovian population. According to the 1926 Soviet census, these governorates had population of 1,328,441 persons, of which 32.2% were Mordovians, 63.2% were Russians and 4.5% were Tatars.

The Okrug was subdivided into the following 23 districts (raions): Ардатовский, Атяшевский, Ачадовский, Беднодемьяновский, Дубенский, Ельниковский, Зубово-Полянский, Инсарский, Краснослободский, Ковылкинский, Кочкуровский, Козловский, Наровчатский, Ромодановский, Рузаевский, Рыбкинский, Саранский, Старошайговский, Талызинский, Темниковский, Теньгушевский, Торбеевский, Чамзинский.

The overall administrative/management organization of the Okrug was finalized at the 1st Congress of Soviets of Mordovian Okrug (August 4–5, 1928). The first leader of the Okrug (chairman of the okrug executive committee) was С.С.Шишканов (S.S. Shishkanov).

The Mordovian Okrug was elevated to the status of an autonomous oblast becoming the Mordovian Autonomous Oblast on 10 January 1930. The autonomous oblast was transformed into the Mordovian Autonomous Soviet Socialist Republic of RSFSR on 20 December 1934.

== See also ==
- Saransky Uyezd
