= Mordovian Autonomous Soviet Socialist Republic =

Geographical object

Mordovian Autonomous Soviet Socialist Republic Мордовская Автономная Советская Социалистическая Республика (Russian) Мордовскяй Автономнай Советскяй Социалистическяй Республикась (Moksha) Мордовской Автономной Советской Социалистической Республикась (Erzya)
- ASSR of the Russian SFSR; Republic of the Russian Federation
- 1934–1993
- Flag (1954–1990) Emblem (1978–1993)

- Mordovian ASSR in upper left corner
- Capital: Saransk
- Government
  - Type: Soviet republic
  - Motto: Сембе масторонь пролетариятне, пуромода марс! (Moksha); Весе масторонь пролетарийть, вейсэндяводо! (Erzyan) "Workers of the world, unite!"
- History
  - Established: 20 December 1934
  - Sovereignty declared (Renamed to the Mordovian SSR): 7 December 1990
  - Renamed to the Republic of Mordovia: 25 December 1993
Preceded by	Succeeded by
Mordovian AO	Republic of Mordovia

The Mordovian Autonomous Soviet Socialist Republic (Russian: Мордовская Автономная Советская Социалистическая Республика, Mordovskaya Avtonomnaya Sovetskaya Sotsialisticheskaya Respublika; Moksha: Мордовскяй Автономнай Советскяй Социалистическяй Республикась, Mordovskjaj Avtonomnaj Sovetskjaj Socialističeskjaj Respublikaś; Erzya: Мордовской Автономной Советской Социалистической Республикась, Mordovskoj Avtonomnoj Sovetskoj Socialističeskoj Respublikaś) was an autonomous republic of the Russian SFSR within the Soviet Union. It is now known as the Republic of Mordovia, a federal subject of Russia.

== History ==
The Mordovian Autonomous Soviet Socialist Republic was established on December 20, 1934 by the transformation from Mordovian Autonomous Oblast of Kuybyshev Krai. After Kuybyshev Krai was itself transformed into Kuybyshev Oblast, the Mordovian ASSR was separated from it and subordinated to the Russian Soviet Federative Socialist Republic.

On December 7, 1990, the Supreme Soviet of the Mordovian ASSR adopted the Declaration on the legal status of the Mordovian Republic, which transformed the republic into the Mordovian Soviet Socialist Republic. The republic was renamed the Republic of Mordovia on January 25, 1994.

== See also ==
- Mordovian Okrug
- Mordovian Autonomous Oblast
- Mordovian Regional Committee of the Communist Party of the Soviet Union
- Flag of the Mordovian Autonomous Soviet Socialist Republic
