= Italian team at the running events =

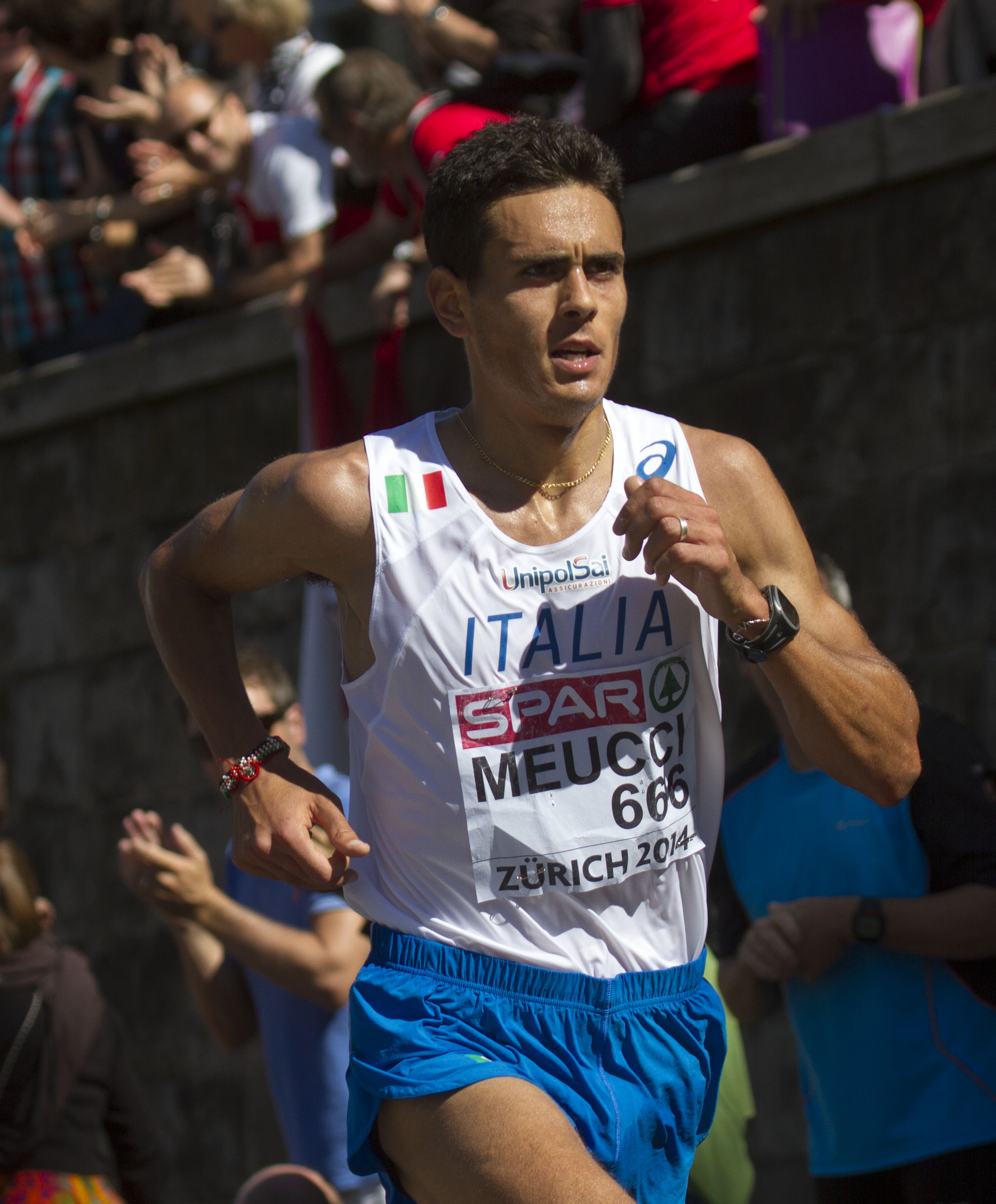
Daniele Meucci, nine medals won with the Italian team.

The Italian team at the running events represents Italy at senior level at the road running (marathon, half marathon), racewalking, cross country running and track long-distance running (10,000 metres) events, such as World championships, World of European Cups.

== Medals ==
Event	Men			Women			Total			Notes
Event	1st place, gold medalist(s)	2nd place, silver medalist(s)	3rd place, bronze medalist(s)	1st place, gold medalist(s)	2nd place, silver medalist(s)	3rd place, bronze medalist(s)	1st place, gold medalist(s)	2nd place, silver medalist(s)	3rd place, bronze medalist(s)	Notes
World Marathon Cup	3	4	1	1	1	2	4	5	3	
World Half Marathon Championships	1	0	1	0	0	1	1	0	2	
World Cross Country Championships	0	0	0	0	3	1	0	3	1	
World Race Walking Team Championships	4	7	7	1	4	2	5	11	9	details
European Marathon Cup	4	2	2	3	4	0	7	6	2	
European Half Marathon Cup	0	0	1	0	1	0	0	1	1	
European Cross Country Championships	1	1	3	0	0	0	1	1	3	
European Race Walking Cup	2	6	5	3	5	0	5	11	5	details
European 10,000m Cup	4	4	5	1	4	3	5	8	8	

== World Marathon Cup ==
✓ Updated at the final edition. The competition is defunct, Daegu 2011 was the last edition.

Gendre	1st place, gold medalist(s)	2nd place, silver medalist(s)	3rd place, bronze medalist(s)	Tot.
Men	3	4	1	8
Women	1	1	2	4
Total	4	5	3	12

Edition	Team	Medal
1985 Hiroshima	Laura Fogli, Rita Marchisio, Emma Scaunich	1st place, gold medalist(s)
1987 Seoul	Salvatore Bettiol, Salvatore Nicosia, Osvaldo Faustini	1st place, gold medalist(s)
1989 Milan	Salvatore Bettiol, Salvatore Nicosia, Osvaldo Faustini	2nd place, silver medalist(s)
1991 London	Anna Villani, Antonella Bizioli, Laura Fogli	2nd place, silver medalist(s)
1993 San Sebastián	Severino Bernardini, Luca Barzaghi, Walter Durbano	2nd place, silver medalist(s)
1995 Athens	Davide Milesi, Marco Gozzano, Roberto Crosio	1st place, gold medalist(s)
1995 Athens	Ornella Ferrara, Maura Viceconte, Antonella Bizioli	3rd place, bronze medalist(s)
1997 Athens	Danilo Goffi, Giacomo Leone, Francesco Ingargiola	2nd place, silver medalist(s)
1997 Athens	Ornella Ferrara, Franca Fiacconi, Laura Fogli	3rd place, bronze medalist(s)
1999 Seville	Vincenzo Modica, Danilo Goffi, Daniele Caimmi	1st place, gold medalist(s)
2001 Edmonton	Stefano Baldini, Giacomo Leone, Alberico Di Cecco	3rd place, bronze medalist(s)
2003 Paris	Stefano Baldini, Daniele Caimmi, Alberico Di Cecco	2nd place, silver medalist(s)

== World Half Marathon Championships ==
Edition	Team	Medal
1995 Montbéliard–Belfort	Vincenzo Modica, Danilo Goffi, Giacomo Leone	3rd place, bronze medalist(s)
1996 Palma de Mallorca	Stefano Baldini, Giacomo Leone, Vincenzo Modica	1st place, gold medalist(s)
1996 Palma de Mallorca	Lucilla Andreucci, Annalisa Scurti, Sonia Maccioni	3rd place, bronze medalist(s)

== World Cross Country Championships ==
In italic the participants whose result did not go into the team's total scoring points, but awarded with medals.

Edition	Team	Medal
1974 Monza	Paola Pigni, Margherita Gargano, Silvana Cruciata, Bruna Lovisolo, Waltraud Egger, Giovanna Leone	2nd place, silver medalist(s)
1976 Chepstow	Gabriella Dorio, Margherita Gargano, Silvana Cruciata, Cristina Tomasini, Sonia Basso	2nd place, silver medalist(s)
1981 Madrid	Agnese Possamai, Cristina Tomasini, Silvana Cruciata, Alba Milana, Nadia Dandolo, Marina Loddo	3rd place, bronze medalist(s)
1982 Rome	Agnese Possamai, Nadia Dandolo, Cristina Tomasini, Rita Marchisio, Margherita Gargano, Gabriella Dorio	2nd place, silver medalist(s)

== World Race Walking Team Championships ==
From 1975 to 1997 was awarded Lugano Trophy for combined team (20K + 50K). Since 1993 the medals have been awarded for the single events of the 20K and 50K teams, therefore in the 1993, 1995 and 1997 editions three team medals were assigned, from 1999 the combined was abolished and the team medals remained two until the present day.

Edition	Event	Team	Medal
1961 Lugano	Men's combined	Giuseppe Dordoni, Gianni Corsaro, Stefano Serchinich (20K); Abdon Pamich, Luigi De Rosso, Antonio De Gaetano (50K)	3rd place, bronze medalist(s)
1973 Lugano	Men's combined	Armando Zambaldo, Pasquale Busca, Abdon Pamich (20K); Vittorio Visini, Rosario Valore, Domenico Carpentieri (50K)	3rd place, bronze medalist(s)
1977 Mylton Keynes	Men's combined	Maurizio Damilano, Armando Zambaldo, Roberto Buccione, Sandro Bellucci (20K); Paolo Grecucci, Franco Vecchio, Rosario Valore (50K)	3rd place, bronze medalist(s)
1981 Valencia	Men's combined	Alessandro Pezzatini, Maurizio Damilano, Carlo Mattioli, Paolo Grecucci (20K); Sandro Bellucci, Giacomo Poggi, Domenico Carpentieri (50K)	1st place, gold medalist(s)
1983 Bergen	Men's combined	Maurizio Damilano, Carlo Mattioli, Giorgio Damilano, Alessandro Pezzatini (20K); Paolo Grecucci, Paolo Ghedina, Giacomo Poggi, Sandro Bellucci (50K)	2nd place, silver medalist(s)
1985 St John's	Men's combined	Maurizio Damilano, Carlo Mattioli, Alessandro Pezzatini, Walter Arena (20K); Sandro Bellucci, Raffaello Ducceschi, Massimo Quiriconi, Giorgio Damilano (50K)	3rd place, bronze medalist(s)
1987 New York	Men's combined	Maurizio Damilano, Walter Arena, Carlo Mattioli, Giorgio Damilano (20K); Sandro Bellucci, Raffaello Ducceschi, Giacomo Poggi, Pierluigi Fiorella (50K)	2nd place, silver medalist(s)
1989 L'Hospitalet	Men's combined	Maurizio Damilano, Giovanni De Benedictis, Carlo Mattioli (20K); Sandro Bellucci, Massimo Quiriconi, Giuseppe De Gaetano, Raffaello Ducceschi (50K)	2nd place, silver medalist(s)
1989 L'Hospitalet	Women's 10 km	Ileana Salvador, Annarita Sidoti, Maria Grazia Orsani, Antonella Marangoni, Erica Alfridi	3rd place, bronze medalist(s)
1991 San Josè	Men's combined	Giovanni De Benedictis, Walter Arena, Maurizio Damilano, Giovanni Perricelli (20K); Giuseppe De Gaetano, Sandro Bellucci, Massimo Quiriconi, Carlo Mattioli (50K)	1st place, gold medalist(s)
1991 San Josè	Women's 10 km	Ileana Salvador, Annarita Sidoti, Pier Carola Pagani, Maria Grazia Cogoli, Elisabetta Perrone	2nd place, silver medalist(s)
1993 Monterrey	Men's 20 km	Giovanni De Benedictis, Giovanni Perricelli, Walter Arena, Arturo Di Mezza, Sergio Spagnulo	2nd place, silver medalist(s)
1993 Monterrey	Men's combined	Giovanni De Benedictis, Giovanni Perricelli, Walter Arena, Arturo Di Mezza, Sergio Spagnulo (20K); Giuseppe De Gaetano, Massimo Quiriconi, Paolo Bianchi, Giacomo Cimarrusti, Bruno Penocchio (50K)	3rd place, bronze medalist(s)
1993 Monterrey	Women's 10 km	Ileana Salvador, Annarita Sidoti, Elisabetta Perrone, Cristiana Pellino, Erica Alfridi	1st place, gold medalist(s)
1995 Beijing	Men's 20 km	Michele Didoni, Walter Arena, Enrico Lang, Giovanni Perricelli	2nd place, silver medalist(s)
1995 Beijing	Men's combined	Michele Didoni, Walter Arena, Enrico Lang, Giovanni Perricelli (20K); Giovanni De Benedictis, Paolo Bianchi, Giuseppe De Gaetano, Patrizio Parchesepe (50K)	2nd place, silver medalist(s)
1995 Beijing	Women's 10 km	Elisabetta Perrone, Rossella Giordano, Annarita Sidoti, Cristiana Pellino, Ileana Salvador	2nd place, silver medalist(s)
1997 Poděbrady	Women's 10 km	Erica Alfridi, Rossella Giordano, Annarita Sidoti, Elisabetta Perrone, Cristiana Pellino	2nd place, silver medalist(s)
2002 Turin	Men's 20 km	Alessandro Gandellini, Lorenzo Civallero, Marco Giungi, Enrico Lang, Alfio Corsaro	3rd place, bronze medalist(s)
2002 Turin	Women's 20 km	Erica Alfridi, Rossella Giordano, Elisa Rigaudo, Gisella Orsini, Elisabetta Perrone	2nd place, silver medalist(s)
2004 Maumburg	Men's 20 km	Ivano Brugnetti, Alessandro Gandellini, Marco Giungi, Lorenzo Civallero	3rd place, bronze medalist(s)
2008 Cheboksary	Men's 50 km	Alex Schwazer, Marco De Luca, Diego Cafagna, Dario Privitera, Matteo Giupponi	1st place, gold medalist(s)
2016 Rome	Men's 50 km	Marco De Luca, Teodorico Caporaso, Matteo Giupponi, Federico Tontodonati	1st place, gold medalist(s)
2018 Taicang	Men's 20 km	Massimo Stano, Francesco Fortunato, Giorgio Rubino	2nd place, silver medalist(s)
2018 Taicang	Women's 20 km	Eleonora Giorgi, Valentina Trapletti, Antonella Palmisano, Eleonora Dominici, Nicole Colombi	2nd place, silver medalist(s)

=== Multiple medalists ===
Below are the medals won by the Italian team, therefore the medals won in the individual competition are excluded.

Athlete	1st place, gold medalist(s)	2nd place, silver medalist(s)	3rd place, bronze medalist(s)	Period	Races
Sandro Bellucci	2	3	2	1977–1989	20k/50k
Maurizio Damilano	2	3	2	1977–1989	20k
Carlo Mattioli	2	3	1	1981–1991	20k
Matteo Giupponi	2	0	0	2008–2016	50k
Elisabetta Perrone	1	4	0	1993–2002	10k/20k
Giovanni De Benedictis	1	3	1	1989–1995	20K/50k
Gianni Perricelli	1	3	1	1983–1995	20k
Annarita Sidoti	1	3	1	1989–1997	10k/20k
Erica Alfridi	1	2	1	1989–2002	10k/20k
Ileana Salvador	1	2	1	1989–1995	10k/20k

== European Marathon Cup ==
In italic the participants whose result did not go into the team's total scoring points (first three athletes), but awarded with medals from 1994, before the score was calculated summing the placings of the first 4 classified who were the only awarded with medal.

Edition	Team	Medal
1981 Agen	Massimo Magnani, Giampaolo Messina, Gianni Poli, Armando Scozzari	1st place, gold medalist(s)
1983 Laredo	Gianni Poli, Marco Marchei, Giampaolo Messina, Antonio Erotavo	2nd place, silver medalist(s)
1985 Rome	Alessio Faustini, Gelindo Bordin, Aldo Fantoni, Loris Pimazzoni	3rd place, bronze medalist(s)
1985 Rome	Laura Fogli, Emma Scaunich, Rita Marchisio, Paola Moro	2nd place, silver medalist(s)
1994 Helsinki	Maria Curatolo, Ornella Ferrara, Rosanna Munerotto, Anna Villani, Bettina Sabatini	1st place, gold medalist(s)
1998 Budapest	Stefano Baldini, Danilo Goffi, Vincenzo Modica, Giovanni Ruggiero, Ottaviano Andriani	1st place, gold medalist(s)
1998 Budapest	Maura Viceconte, Franca Fiacconi, Gigliola Borghini, Francesca Zanusso, Paola Vignati	2nd place, silver medalist(s)
2002 Munich	Daniele Caimmi, Migidio Bourifa, Alberico di Cecco, Danilo Goffi, Ottaviano Andriani, Sergio Chiesa	2nd place, silver medalist(s)
2006 Gothenburg	Stefano Baldini, Francesco Ingargiola, Danilo Goffi	1st place, gold medalist(s)
2006 Gothenburg	Bruna Genovese, Deborah Toniolo, Giovanna Volpato, Anna Incerti, Marcella Mancini	1st place, gold medalist(s)
2010 Barcelona	Ruggero Pertile, Migidio Bourifa, Ottaviano Andriani, Daniele Caimmi	3rd place, bronze medalist(s)
2010 Barcelona	Anna Incerti, Rosaria Console, Deborah Toniolo	1st place, gold medalist(s)
2014 Helsinki	Valeria Straneo, Anna Incerti, Nadia Ejjafini, Emma Quaglia, Deborah Toniolo, Rosaria Console	1st place, gold medalist(s)
2018 Berlin	Yassine Rachik, Eyob Faniel, Stefano La Rosa	1st place, gold medalist(s)
2018 Berlin	Sara Dossena, Catherine Bertone, Fatna Maraoui, Laura Gotti	2nd place, silver medalist(s)

== European Half Marathon Cup ==
✓ Updated at June 2024

Gendre	1st place, gold medalist(s)	2nd place, silver medalist(s)	3rd place, bronze medalist(s)	Tot.
Men	1	0	1	2
Women	0	1	0	1
Total	1	1	1	3

In italic the participants whose result did not go into the team's total time, but awarded with medals

Edition	Team	Medal
2016 Amsterdam	Daniele Meucci, Stefano La Rosa, Ruggero Pertile, Xavier Chevrier, Daniele D'Onofrio	3rd place, bronze medalist(s)
2016 Amsterdam	Veronica Inglese, Anna Incerti, Rosaria Console, Laila Soufyane, Catherine Bertone	2nd place, silver medalist(s)
2024 Rome	Yemaneberhan Crippa, Pietro Riva, Pasquale Selvarolo, Eyob Faniel, Yohanes Chiappinelli, Daniele Meucci	1st place, gold medalist(s)

== European Cross Country Championships ==
In italic the participants whose result did not go into the team's total time, but awarded with medals.

Edition	Team	Medal
1998 Ferrara	Giuliano Battocletti, Gabriele De Nard, Umberto Pusterla, Gennaro Di Napoli	1st place, gold medalist(s)
2004 Heringsdorf	Umberto Pusterla, Maurizio Leone, Michele Gamba, Gabriele De Nard, Luciano Di Pardo, Giuliano Battocletti	2nd place, silver medalist(s)
2009 Dublin	Daniele Meucci, Stefano La Rosa, Andrea Lalli, Gabriele De Nard	3rd place, bronze medalist(s)
2012 Szentendre	Andrea Lalli, Daniele Meucci, Gabriele De Nard, Patrick Nasti, Alex Baldaccini	3rd place, bronze medalist(s)
2014 Samokov	Stefano La Rosa, Marouan Razine, Patrick Nasti, Ahmed El Mazoury	3rd place, bronze medalist(s)
2018 Tilburg	Yemaneberhan Crippa, Daniele Meucci, Nekagenet Crippa, Ahmed El Mazoury, Andrea Sanguinetti, Marouan Razine	3rd place, bronze medalist(s)

== European Race Walking Cup ==
In italic the participants whose result did not go into the team's total time, but awarded with medals.

Edition	Race	Team	Medal
1996 La Coruña	Men's 20 km walk	Giovanni de Benedictis, Giovanni Perricelli, Enrico Lang, Michele Didoni	3rd place, bronze medalist(s)
1996 La Coruña	Men's 50 km walk	Arturo Di Mezza, Orazio Romanzi, Paolo Bianchi, Massimo Fizialetti	2nd place, silver medalist(s)
1996 La Coruña	Women's 10 km walk	Annarita Sidoti, Rossella Giordano, Elisabetta Perrone, Erica Alfridi	1st place, gold medalist(s)
1998 Dudince	Men's 50 km walk	Giovanni Perricelli, Arturo Di Mezza, Alessandro Mistretta, Orazio Romanzi	2nd place, silver medalist(s)
1998 Dudince	Women's 10 km walk	Erica Alfridi, Santa Compagnoni, Elisabetta Perrone	2nd place, silver medalist(s)
2000 Eisenhüttenstadt	Women's 20 km walk	Elisabetta Perrone, Erica Alfridi, Annarita Sidoti, Cristiana Pellino	1st place, gold medalist(s)
2001 Dudince	Men's 20 km walk	Lorenzo Civallero, Vittorino Mucci, Alfio Corsaro	3rd place, bronze medalist(s)
2001 Dudince	Women's 20 km walk	Elisabetta Perrone, Erica Alfridi, Annarita Sidoti, Gisella Orsini	2nd place, silver medalist(s)
2003 Cheboksary	Men's 20 km walk	Alessandro Gandellini, Lorenzo Civallero, Enrico Lang	3rd place, bronze medalist(s)
2003 Cheboksary	Women's 20 km walk	Elisabetta Perrone, Rossella Giordano, Elisa Rigaudo, Gisella Orsini	1st place, gold medalist(s)
2005 Miskolc	Men's 50 km walk	Alex Schwazer, Diego Cafagna, Marco De Luca, Alessandro Mistretta	3rd place, bronze medalist(s)
2005 Miskolc	Women's 20 km walk	Elisa Rigaudo, Gisella Orsini, Rossella Giordano	2nd place, silver medalist(s)
2007 Leamington Spa	Men's 20 km walk	Ivano Brugnetti, Giorgio Rubino, Fortunato D'Onofrio, Jean-Jacques Nkouloukidi	2nd place, silver medalist(s)
2009 Metz	Men's 20 km walk	Giorgio Rubino, Ivano Brugnetti, Jean-Jacques Nkouloukidi, Matteo Giupponi	1st place, gold medalist(s)
2009 Metz	Men's 50 km walk	Marco De Luca, Diego Cafagna, Fortunato D'Onofrio	3rd place, bronze medalist(s)
2011 Olhão	Men's 20 km walk	Giorgio Rubino, Matteo Giupponi, Federico Tontodonati	2nd place, silver medalist(s)
2011 Olhão	Men's 50 km walk	Marco De Luca, Jean-Jacques Nkouloukidi, Lorenzo Dessi, Teodorico Caporaso	1st place, gold medalist(s)
2013 Dudince			
2015 Murcia	Men's 50 km walk	Marco De Luca, Teodorico Caporaso, Federico Tontodonati, Lorenzo Dessi	2nd place, silver medalist(s)
2015 Murcia	Women's 20 km walk	Eleonora Giorgi, Elisa Rigaudo, Valentina Trapletti, Federica Ferraro	2nd place, silver medalist(s)
2017 Poděbrady	Men's 50 km walk	Michele Antonelli, Teodorico Caporaso, Andrea Agrusti, Federico Tontodonati	2nd place, silver medalist(s)
2017 Poděbrady	Women's 20 km walk	Antonella Palmisano, Valentina Trapletti, Nicole Colombi, Sibilla Di Vincenzo	2nd place, silver medalist(s)
2019 Alytus	Women's 20 km women	Eleonora Dominici, Valentina Trapletti, Nicole Colombi, Antonella Palmisano	2nd place, silver medalist(s)
2019 Alytus	Women's 50 km women	Eleonora Giorgi, Mariavittoria Becchetti, Federica Curiazzi, Beatrice Foresti	3rd place, bronze medalist(s)

=== Multiple medalists ===
Below are the medals won by the Italian team, therefore the medals won in the individual competition are excluded.

Athlete	1st place, gold medalist(s)	2nd place, silver medalist(s)	3rd place, bronze medalist(s)	Period	Races
Elisabetta Perrone	3	2	0	1996-2003	10k/20k
Annarita Sidoti	2	2	0	1996-2001	10k/20k
Erica Alfridi	2	2	0	1996-2001	10k/20k
Rossella Giordano	2	1	0	1996-2005	10k/20k
Jean-Jacques Nkouloikidi	2	1	0	2007-2011	20k/50k
Elisa Rigaudo	1	2	0	2003-2015	20k
Gisella Orsini	1	2	0	2001-2005	20k
Giorgio Rubino	1	2	0	2007-2011	20k
Teodorico Caporaso	1	2	0	2011-2017	50k
Marco De Luca	1	1	2	2005-2015	50k
Ivano Brugnetti	1	1	0	2007-2009	20k
Matteo Giupponi	1	1	0	2009-2011	20k
Lorenzo Dessi	1	1	0	2011-2015	50k
Cristiana Pellino	1	0	0	2003	20k
Federico Tontodonati	0	3	0	2011-2017	20k
Arturo Di Mezza	0	2	0	1996-1998	50k
Orazio Romanzi	0	2	0	1996-1998	50k

== European 10,000m Cup ==
=== Individual medals ===
Edition	Athlete	Medal
2000 Lisbon	Agata Balsamo	3rd place, bronze medalist(s)
2002 Camaiore	Marco Mazza	3rd place, bronze medalist(s)
2006 Antalya	Silvia Weissteiner	2nd place, silver medalist(s)
2013 Pravets	Ahmed El Mazoury	3rd place, bronze medalist(s)
2015 Cagliari	Jamel Chatbi	3rd place, bronze medalist(s)
2015 Cagliari	Valeria Straneo	2nd place, silver medalist(s)
2016 Mersin	Daniele Meucci	1st place, gold medalist(s)
2016 Mersin	Jamel Chatbi	3rd place, bronze medalist(s)
2016 Mersin	Rosaria Console	2nd place, silver medalist(s)
2018 London	Yeman Crippa	3rd place, bronze medalist(s)
2019 London	Yeman Crippa	1st place, gold medalist(s)

=== Team medals ===
Legend: in italic the athletes whose time was not scored in the team rankings, because the first three classifieds of each nation their time is added up. In any case, the medals were awarded to the participants, although they did not finish the race.

Edition	Team	Medal
1997 Barakaldo	Vincenzo Modica, Simone Zanon, Antonio Armuzzi, Domenico D'Ambrosio	2nd place, silver medalist(s)
1999 Barakaldo	Simone Zanon, Rachid Berradi, Giuliano Battocletti, Andrea Arlati	3rd place, bronze medalist(s)
1999 Barakaldo	Maria Guida, Silvia Sommaggio, Maura Viceconte, Sabrina Varrone, Lucilla Andreucci	2nd place, silver medalist(s)
2002 Camaiore	Marco Mazza, Michele Gamba, Simone Zanon, Mattia Maccagnan	1st place, gold medalist(s)
2002 Camaiore	Gloria Marconi, Agata Balsamo, Silvia Sommaggio, Rosita Rota Gelpi, Patrizia Tisi	3rd place, bronze medalist(s)
2003 Athens	Marco Mazza, Giovanni Gualdi, Marco Bartoletti Stella, Mattia Maccagnan	3rd place, bronze medalist(s)
2004 Maribor	Giuliano Battocletti, Umberto Pusterla, Domenico D'Ambrosio	3rd place, bronze medalist(s)
2004 Maribor	Patrizia Tisi, Anna Incerti, Vincenza Sicari, Silvia Sommaggio	3rd place, bronze medalist(s)
2006 Antalya	Marco Mazza, Gianmarco Buttazzo, Daniele Meucci, Mattia Maccagnan, Gabriele De Nard	3rd place, bronze medalist(s)
2006 Antalya	Silvia Weissteiner, Renate Rungger, Patrizia Tisi, Deborah Toniolo, Geia Gualtieri	2nd place, silver medalist(s)
2007 Ferrara	Daniele Meucci, Gianmarco Buttazzo, Fabio Mascheroni, Mattia Maccagnan, Cosimo Caliandro	2nd place, silver medalist(s)
2007 Ferrara	Fatna Maraoui, Silvia Sommaggio, Renate Rungger, Sara Dossena, Anna Incerti	2nd place, silver medalist(s)
2008 Istanbul	Daniele Meucci, Gianmarco Buttazzo, Fabio Mascheroni, Francesco Bona	3rd place, bronze medalist(s)
2011 Oslo	Nadia Ejjafini, Rosaria Console, Elena Romagnolo, Federica Dal Ri, Laila Soufyane, Silvia Weissteiner	1st place, gold medalist(s)
2012 Bilbao	Nadia Ejjafini, Valeria Straneo, Elena Romagnolo, Claudia Pinna, Silvia Weissteiner, Federica Dal Ri	2nd place, silver medalist(s)
2013 Pravets	Ahmed El Mazoury, Stefano La Rosa, Andrea Lalli, Gianmarco Buttazzo, Stefano Scaini	1st place, gold medalist(s)
2014 Skopje	Jamel Chatbi, Ahmed El Mazoury, Gianmarco Buttazzo, Manuel Cominotto, Paolo Zanatta	2nd place, silver medalist(s)
2015 Cagliari	Jamel Chatbi, Stefano La Rosa, Ahmed El Mazoury, Daniele D'Onofrio, Najibe Salami	1st place, gold medalist(s)
2015 Cagliari	Valeria Straneo, Anna Incerti, Claudia Pinna, Valeria Roffino, Federica Dal Ri	3rd place, bronze medalist(s)
2016 Mersin	Daniele Meucci, Jamel Chatbi, Stefano La Rosa, Najibe Salami, Daniele D'Onofrio	1st place, gold medalist(s)
2017 Minsk	Stefano La Rosa, Ahmed El Mazoury, Najibe Salami, Eyob Faniel, Samuele Dini, Lorenzo Dini	2nd place, silver medalist(s)
2019 London	Yemaneberhan Crippa, Lorenzo Dini, Said El Otmani, Daniele Meucci, Italo Quazzola, Marco Najibe Salami	1st place, gold medalist(s)
2019 London	Sara Dossena, Isabel Mattuzzi, Giovanna Epis, Maria Chiara Cascavilla, Valeria Roffino, Rebecca Lonedo	3rd place, bronze medalist(s)
2021 Birmingham	Giovanna Epis, Anna Arnaudo, Rebecca Lonedo, Federica Sugamiele, Martina Merlo	2nd place, silver medalist(s)

=== Multiple medalists ===
Below are the medals won by the Italian team, therefore the medals won in the individual competition are excluded.

#	Athlete	1st place, gold medalist(s)	2nd place, silver medalist(s)	3rd place, bronze medalist(s)	Tot.
1	Stefano La Rosa	3	1	0	4
1	Najibe Salami	3	1	0	4
3	Ahmed El Mazoury	2	2	0	4
4	Daniele Meucci	2	1	2	5
5	Jamel Chatbi	2	1	0	3
6	Yeman Crippa	2	0	1	3
7	Daniele D'Onofrio	2	0	0	2
8	Gianmarco Buttazzo	1	2	3	4
9	Silvia Weissteiner	1	2	0	3
10	Federica Dal Ri	1	1	1	3
11	Nadia Ejjafini	1	1	0	2

== See also ==
- Italy national athletics team
- Italian national track relay team
