= 2005 Italian Athletics Championships =

- Dates: 25–26 June
- Host city: Brixen
- Level: Senior
- Events: 53

The 2005 Italian Athletics Championships was the 95th edition of the Italian Athletics Championships and were held in Brixen (track & field events).

== Champions ==
=== Men ===
Event	Athlete	Performance
100 metres	Simone Collio	10.56
200 metres	Koura Kaba Fantoni	20.58
400 metres	Andrea Barberi	45.89
800 metres	Andrea Longo	1:51.21
1500 metres	Christian Obrist	3:45.14
5000 metres	Simone Zanon	14:03.99
10,000 metres	Giuliano Battocletti	28:39.26
110 metres hurdles	Andrea Giaconi	14.12
400 metres hurdles	Gianni Carabelli	49.05
3000 metres steeplechase	Yuri Floriani	8:44.08
High jump	Nicola Ciotti	2.28
Pole vault	Giorgio Piantella	5.30
Long jump	Stefano Dacastello	7.82
Triple jump	Paolo Camossi	16.86
Shot put	Marco Dodoni	18.93
Discus throw	Hannes Kirchler	60.84
Hammer throw	Nicola Vizzoni	74.29
Javelin throw	Francesco Pignata	78.36
Decathlon	Paolo Mottadelli	7344
Half Marathon	Fabio Mascheroni	01:04:58
Marathon	Vincenzo Modica	02:14:03
10,000 metres track walk	Enrico Lang	41:42.49
20 km road walk	Giorgio Rubino	01:24:01
50 km road walk	Alex Schwazer	03:56:59
Cross country (long course)	Maurizio Leone	
Cross country (short course)	Luciano Di Pardo	
Mountain running	Marco Gaiardo	

=== Women ===
Event	Athlete	Performance
100 metres	Vincenza Calì	11.59
200 metres	Vincenza Calì	23.22
400 metres	Daniela Reina	53.47
800 metres	Elisa Cusma Piccione	2:03.60
1500 metres	Eleonora Berlanda	4:13.66
3000 metres	-	-
5000 metres	Silvia Weissteiner	16:14.11
100 metres hurdles	Micol Cattaneo	13.49
10,000 metres	Renate Rungger	33:15.96
400 metres hurdles	Benedetta Ceccarelli	55.66
3000 metres steeplechase	Elena Romagnolo	10:22.25
High jump	Stefania Cadamuro	1.89
Pole vault	Sara Bruzzese	4.10
Long jump	Fiona May	6.50w
Triple jump	Simona La Mantia	14.62
Shot put	Chiara Rosa	18.71
Discus throw	Cristiana Checchi	53.60
Hammer throw	Ester Balassini	73.59
Javelin throw	Zahra Bani	59.30
Heptathlon	Elisa Trevisan	5744
Marathon	Ivana Iozzia	02:35:55
Cross country (long course)	Patrizia Tisi	
Cross country (short course)	Federica Dal Ri	
Half Marathon	Bruna Genovese	01:14:40
5000 Metres Track Walk	Sibilla Di Vincenzo	22:17.60
20 Kilometres Road Walk	Elisa Rigaudo	01:33:46
Mountain running	Vittoria Salvini	
