= Italy at the World Athletics Race Walking Team Championships =

Italy team at athletics event

- WA code: ITA
- National federation: FIDAL
- Website: www.fidal.it
- Medals Ranked 11th: Gold 2 Silver 2 Bronze 7 Total 11

Italy has competed at every edition of the World Athletics Race Walking Team Championships (IAAF World Race Walking Cup until 2016, than IAAF World Race Walking Team Championships until 2018) form Lugano 1961.

== Medals ==
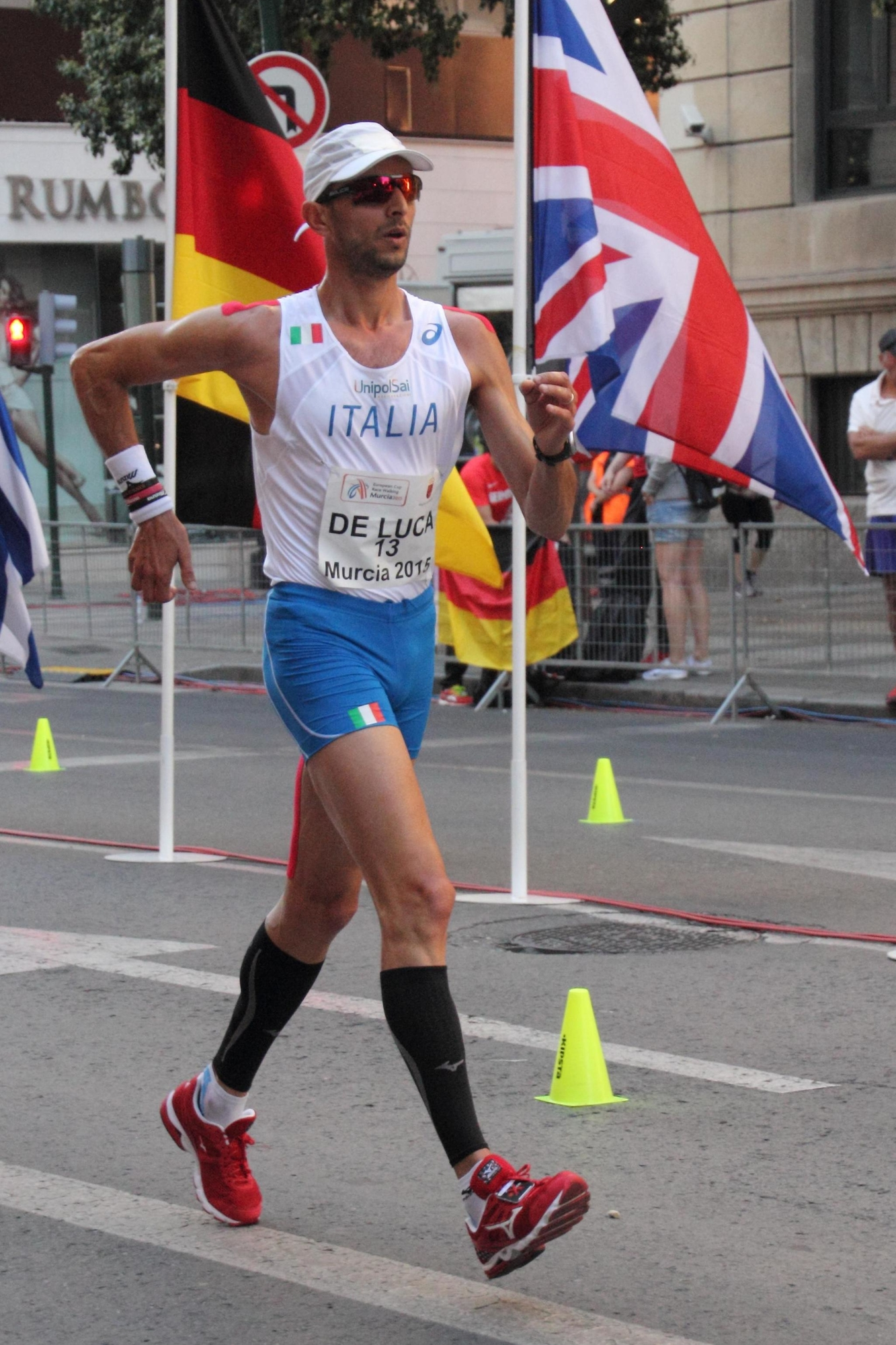
Marco De Luca won bronze medal in 50 km at Rome 2016 (won also gold medal with the team).

Update to 2018 Taicang

	1st edition	last edition	Men				Women				Total			
	1st edition	last edition	1st place, gold medalist(s)	2nd place, silver medalist(s)	3rd place, bronze medalist(s)	Tot.	1st place, gold medalist(s)	2nd place, silver medalist(s)	3rd place, bronze medalist(s)	Tot.	1st place, gold medalist(s)	2nd place, silver medalist(s)	3rd place, bronze medalist(s)	Tot.
Individual	Lugano 1961	2018 Taicang	1	2	6	9	1	0	1	2	2	2	7	11
Team	Lugano 1961 (men 20 & 50 km unified); Monterrey 1993 (men); Grand-Quevilly 1975 (women)	2018 Taicang	4	8	7	19	1	5	1	7	5	13	8	26

== Medals details ==
=== Men ===
==== Individual ====
Edition	Event	1st place, gold medalist(s)	2nd place, silver medalist(s)	3rd place, bronze medalist(s)
(Switzerland) 1961 Lugano	50 km	Abdon Pamich		
(Italy) 1965 Pescara	50 km			Abdon Pamich
(United Kingdom) 1977 Milton Keynes	50 km			Paolo Grecucci
(Spain) 1981 Valencia	20 km			Alessandro Pezzatini
(Spain) 1981 Valencia	50 km			Sandro Bellucci
(United Kingdom) 1985 St John's	20 km		Maurizio Damilano	
(Russia) 2008 Cheboksary	50 km		Alex Schwazer	
(Italy) 2016 Rome	50 km			Marco De Luca
(China) 2018 Taicang	20 km			Massimo Stano
(Brazil) 2026 Brasilia	Half marathon	Francesco Fortunato		
Total		2	2	6

==== Team ====
Until 1985, the first 4 classifieds of each nation were ranked for team ranking since 1987. In any case, the medals were awarded to the participants, although they did not finish the race.

Edition	Event	1st place, gold medalist(s)	2nd place, silver medalist(s)	3rd place, bronze medalist(s)
(Switzerland) 1961 Lugano	Lugano Trophy			Giuseppe Dordoni; Gianni Corsaro; Stefano Serchinich (20 km); Abdon Pamich; Luigi De Rosso; Antonio De Gaetano (50 km)
(Switzerland) 1973 Lugano	Lugano Trophy			Armando Zambaldo; Pasquale Busca; Abdon Pamich (20 km); Vittorio Visini; Rosario Valore; Domenico Carpentieri (50 km)
(United Kingdom) 1977 Mylton Keynes	Lugano Trophy			Maurizio Damilano; Armando Zambaldo; Roberto Buccione; Sandro Bellucci (20 km); Paolo Grecucci; Franco Vecchio; Rosario Valore (50 km)
(Spain) 1981 Valencia	Lugano Trophy	Alessandro Pezzatini; Maurizio Damilano; Carlo Mattioli; Paolo Grecucci (20 km); Sandro Bellucci; Giacomo Poggi; Domenico Carpentieri (50 km)		
(Norway) 1983 Bergen	Lugano Trophy		Maurizio Damilano; Carlo Mattioli; Giorgio Damilano; Alessandro Pezzatini (20 km); Paolo Grecucci; Paolo Ghedina; Giacomo Poggi; Sandro Bellucci (50 km)	
(United Kingdom) 1985 St John's	Lugano Trophy			Maurizio Damilano; Carlo Mattioli; Alessandro Pezzatini; Walter Arena (20 km); Sandro Bellucci; Raffaello Ducceschi; Massimo Quiriconi; Giorgio Damilano (50 km)
(United States) 1987 New York City	Lugano Trophy		Maurizio Damilano; Walter Arena; Carlo Mattioli; Giorgio Damilano (20 km); Sandro Bellucci; Raffaello Ducceschi; Giacomo Poggi; Pierluigi Fiorella (50 km)	
(Spain) 1989 L'Hospitalet	Lugano Trophy		Maurizio Damilano; Giovanni De Benedictis; Carlo Mattioli (20 km); Sandro Bellucci; Massimo Quiriconi; Giuseppe De Gaetano; Raffaello Ducceschi (50 km)	
(United States) 1991 San Josè	Lugano Trophy	Giovanni De Benedictis; Walter Arena; Maurizio Damilano; Giovanni Perricelli (20 km); Giuseppe De Gaetano; Sandro Bellucci; Massimo Quiriconi; Carlo Mattioli (50 km)		
(Mexico) 1993 Monterrey	20 km		Giovanni De Benedictis; Giovanni Perricelli; Walter Arena; Arturo Di Mezza; Sergio Spagnulo	
(Mexico) 1993 Monterrey	Lugano Trophy			Giovanni De Benedictis; Giovanni Perricelli; Walter Arena; Arturo Di Mezza; Sergio Spagnulo (20 km); Giuseppe De Gaetano; Massimo Quiriconi; Paolo Bianchi; Giacomo Cimarrusti; Bruno Penocchio (50 km)
(China) 1995 Beijing	Lugano Trophy		Michele Didoni; Walter Arena; Enrico Lang; Giovanni Perricelli (20 km); Giovanni De Benedictis; Paolo Bianchi; Giuseppe De Gaetano; Patrizio Parchesepe (50 km)	
(China) 1995 Beijing	20 km		Michele Didoni; Walter Arena; Enrico Lang; Giovanni Perricelli	
(Italy) 2002 Turin	20 km			Alessandro Gandellini; Lorenzo Civallero; Marco Giungi; Enrico Lang; Alfio Corsaro
(Germany) 2004 Maumburg	20 km			Ivano Brugnetti; Alessandro Gandellini; Marco Giungi; Lorenzo Civallero
(Russia) 2008 Cheboksary	50 km	Alex Schwazer; Marco De Luca; Diego Cafagna; Dario Privitera; Matteo Giupponi		
(Italy) 2016 Rome	50 km	Marco De Luca; Teodorico Caporaso; Matteo Giupponi; Federico Tontodonati		
(China) 2018 Taicang	20 km		Massimo Stano; Francesco Fortunato; Giorgio Rubino (Marco De Luca) DNF (Federico Tontodonati) DNF	
Total		4	8	7

=== Women ===
==== Individual ====
Edition	Event	1st place, gold medalist(s)	2nd place, silver medalist(s)	3rd place, bronze medalist(s)
(Spain) 1989 L'Hospitalet	10 km			Ileana Salvador
(Italy) 2002 Turin	20 km	Erika Alfridi		
(Brazil) 2026 Brasilia	Marathon		Sofia Fiorini	
Total		1	1	1

==== Team ====
Edition	1st place, gold medalist(s)	2nd place, silver medalist(s)	3rd place, bronze medalist(s)	Rank
(West Germany) 1979 Eschborn				8th
(Spain) 1981 Valencia				13th
(Norway) 1983 Bergen				5th
(United Kingdom) 1985 St John's				6th
(United States) 1987 New York City				15th
(Spain) 1989 L'Hospitalet			Ileana Salvador; Annarita Sidoti; Maria Grazia Orsani; Antonella Marangoni; Erica Alfridi	
(United States) 1991 San Josè		Ileana Salvador; Annarita Sidoti; Pier Carola Pagani; Maria Grazia Cogoli; Elisabetta Perrone		
(Mexico) 1993 Monterrey	Ileana Salvador; Annarita Sidoti; Elisabetta Perrone; Cristiana Pellino; Erica Alfridi			
(China) 1995 Beijing		Elisabetta Perrone; Rossella Giordano; Annarita Sidoti; Cristiana Pellino; Ileana Salvador		
(Czech Republic) 1997 Poděbrady		Erica Alfridi; Rossella Giordano; Annarita Sidoti; Elisabetta Perrone; Cristiana Pellino		
(France) 1999 Mézidon-Canon				8th
(Italy) 2002 Turin		Erica Alfridi; Rossella Giordano; Elisa Rigaudo; Gisella Orsini; Elisabetta Perrone DNF		
(Germany) 2004 Maumburg				6th
(Spain) 2006 La Coruña				8th
(Russia) 2008 Cheboksary				7th
(Mexico) 2010 Chihuahua				DNP
(Russia) 2012 Saransk				5th
(China) 2014 Taicang				5th
(Italy) 2016 Rome				6th
(China) 2018 Taicang		20 km Eleonora Giorgi; Valentina Trapletti; Antonella Palmisano; Eleonora Dominici; Nicole Colombi		
Total	1	5	1	

== Multiple medalists ==
Still active

=== Men ===
Athlete	Individual			Team			Total		
Athlete	1st place, gold medalist(s)	2nd place, silver medalist(s)	3rd place, bronze medalist(s)	1st place, gold medalist(s)	2nd place, silver medalist(s)	3rd place, bronze medalist(s)	1st place, gold medalist(s)	2nd place, silver medalist(s)	3rd place, bronze medalist(s)
Maurizio Damilano	0	1	0	2	3	2	2	4	2
Sandro Bellucci	0	0	1	2	3	2	2	3	3
Carlo Mattioli	0	0	0	2	3	1	2	3	1
Marco De Luca	0	0	1	2	1	0	2	1	1
Matteo Giupponi	0	0	0	2	0	0	2	0	0
Walter Arena	0	0	0	1	4	2	1	4	2
Giovanni De Benedictis	0	0	0	1	3	1	1	3	1
Gianni Perricelli	0	0	0	1	3	1	1	3	1
Giacomo Poggi	0	0	0	1	2	0	1	2	0
Paolo Grecucci	0	0	1	1	1	1	1	1	2
Alessandro Pezzatini	0	0	1	1	1	1	1	1	2
Federico Tontodonati	0	0	0	1	1	0	1	1	0
Abdon Pamich	1	0	1	0	0	2	1	0	3

=== Women ===
Athlete	Individual			Team			Total		
Athlete	1st place, gold medalist(s)	2nd place, silver medalist(s)	3rd place, bronze medalist(s)	1st place, gold medalist(s)	2nd place, silver medalist(s)	3rd place, bronze medalist(s)	1st place, gold medalist(s)	2nd place, silver medalist(s)	3rd place, bronze medalist(s)
Erica Alfridi	1	0	0	1	2	1	2	2	1
Elisabetta Perrone	0	0	0	1	4	0	1	4	0
Annarita Sidoti	0	0	0	1	3	1	1	3	1
Ileana Salvador	0	0	1	1	2	1	1	2	2
Cristiana Pellino	0	0	0	1	2	0	1	2	0

== See also ==
- Italy national athletics team
- Italian team at the running events
- Italy at the European Race Walking Team Championships
