= Italy at the European Race Walking Team Championships =

Italy team at athletics event

Italy at the European Race Walking Cup
- WA code: ITA
- National federation: FIDAL
- Website: www.fidal.it
- Medals Ranked 3rd: Gold 15 Silver 26 Bronze 21 Total 62

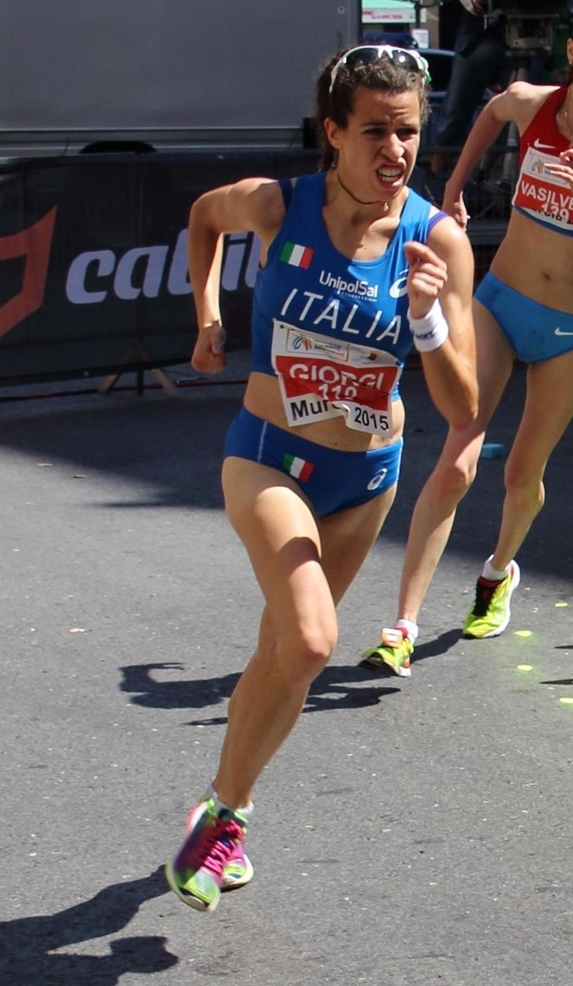
Eleonora Giorgi the woman in activity with the large medalists of the azzurre.

Italy at the European Race Walking Team Championships, at senior level, participated at all editions of the European Race Walking Team Championships (European Race Walking Cup until 2021) from La Coruña 1996.

== Medals ==
The statistics refers at 2021, included only the men's and women's senior races.

	1st edition	last edition	Men				Women				Total			
	1st edition	last edition	1st place, gold medalist(s)	2nd place, silver medalist(s)	3rd place, bronze medalist(s)	Tot.	1st place, gold medalist(s)	2nd place, silver medalist(s)	3rd place, bronze medalist(s)	Tot.	1st place, gold medalist(s)	2nd place, silver medalist(s)	3rd place, bronze medalist(s)	Tot.
Individual	(Spain) La Coruña 1996	(Czech Republic) Poděbrady 2021	1	5	5	11	4	5	4	13	5	10	9	24
Team	(Spain) La Coruña 1996	(Czech Republic) Poděbrady 2021	5	9	7	21	5	7	5	17	10	16	12	38
Total			6	14	12	32	9	12	9	30	15	26	21	62

== Medals details ==
=== Individual ===
Edition	Year	Venue	Event	Athlete	Medal
1st	1996	(Spain) A Coruña	50 km men	Arturo Di Mezza	SILVER
1st	1996	(Spain) A Coruña	10 km women	Annarita Sidoti	GOLD
1st	1996	(Spain) A Coruña	10 km women	Rossella Giordano	SILVER
2nd	1998	(Slovakia) Dudince	50 km men	Gianni Perricelli	BRONZE
3rd	2000	(Germany) Eisenhüttenstadt	20 km women	Elisabetta Perrone	SILVER
4th	2001	(Slovakia) Dudince	20 km women	Elisabetta Perrone	BRONZE
5th	2003	(Russia) Cheboksary	20 km men	Alessandro Gandellini	SILVER
5th	2003	(Russia) Cheboksary	20 km women	Elisabetta Perrone	SILVER
6th	2005	(Hungary) Miskolc	10 km men	Elisa Rigaudo	BRONZE
7th	2007	(United Kingdom) Leamington	20 km men	Ivano Brugnetti	SILVER
8th	2009	(France) Metz	20 km men	Giorgio Rubino	GOLD
8th	2009	(France) Metz	20 km men	Ivano Brugnetti	SILVER
8th	2009	(France) Metz	20 km men	Jean-Jacques Nkouloukidi	BRONZE
9th	2011	(Portugal) Olhão	50 km men	Marco De Luca	SILVER
9th	2011	(Portugal) Olhão	10 km men	Elisa Rigaudo	BRONZE
10th	2013	(Slovakia) Dudince			
11th	2015	(Spain) Murcia	20 km women	Eleonora Giorgi	SILVER
11th	2015	(Spain) Murcia	50 km men	Marco De Luca	BRONZE
12th	2017	(Czech Republic) Poděbrady	20 km women	Antonella Palmisano	GOLD
12th	2017	(Czech Republic) Poděbrady	50 km men	Michele Antonelli	BRONZE
13th	2019	(Lithuania) Alytus	50 km women	Eleonora Giorgi	GOLD
14th	2021	(Czech Republic) Poděbrady	20 km women	Antonella Palmisano	GOLD
14th	2021	(Czech Republic) Poděbrady	35 km women	Eleonora Giorgi	SILVER
14th	2021	(Czech Republic) Poděbrady	35 km women	Lidia Barcella	BRONZE
14th	2021	(Czech Republic) Poděbrady	50 km men	Andrea Agrusti	BRONZE

=== Team ===
Medals are awarded to all participating athletes.

Edition	Year	Venue	Event	Athletes	Medal
1st	1996	(Spain) A Coruña	Women	1. Annarita Sidoti, 2. Rossella Giordano, 5. Elisabetta Perrone, 7. Erica Alfridi	GOLD
1st	1996	(Spain) A Coruña	50 km men	2. Arturo Di Mezza, 5. Orazio Romanzi, 7. Paolo Bianchi, DNF Massimo Fizialetti	SILVER
1st	1996	(Spain) A Coruña	20 m men	10. Giovanni De Benedictis, 11. Gianni Perricelli, 20. Enrico Lang, 27. Michele Didoni	BRONZE
2nd	1998	(Slovakia) Dudince	Women	9. Erica Alfridi, 13. Santa Compagnoni, 14. Elisabetta Perrone, DNF Annarita Sidoti	SILVER
2nd	1998	(Slovakia) Dudince	50 km men	3. Gianni Perricelli, 17. Arturo Di Mezza, 18. Alessandro Mistretta, 35. Orazio Romanzi	SILVER
3rd	2000	(Germany) Eisenhüttenstadt	Women	2. Elisabetta Perrone, 4. Erica Alfridi, 5. Annarita Sidoti, 9. Cristiana Pellino	GOLD
4th	2001	(Slovakia) Dudince	Women	3. Elisabetta Perrone, 4. Erica Alfridi, 11. Annarita Sidoti, 24. Gisella Orsini	SILVER
4th	2001	(Slovakia) Dudince	20 km men	12. Lorenzo Civallero, 21. Vittorio Mucci, 22. Afio Alfredo Corsaro, DNF Alessandro Gandellini	BRONZE
5th	2003	(Russia) Cheboksary	Women	2. Elisabetta Perrone, 12. Rossella Giordano, 13. Elisa Rigaudo, 27. Gisella Orsini	GOLD
5th	2003	(Russia) Cheboksary	20 km men	2. Alessandro Gandellini, 8. Lorenzo Civallero, 16. Enrico Lang, DQ Marco Giungi	BRONZE
6th	2005	(Hungary) Miskolc	Women	3. Elisa Rigaudo, 10. Gisella Orsini, 13. Rossella Giordano, DQ Cristiana Pellino	SILVER
6th	2005	(Hungary) Miskolc	20 km men	6. Alex Schwazer, 11. Diego Cafagna, 13. Marco De Luca, 15. Alessandro Mistretta	BRONZE
7th	2007	(United Kingdom) Leamington	20 km men	2. Ivano Brugnetti, 10. Giorgio Rubino, 20. Fortunato D’Onofrio, 39. Jean-Jacques Nkouloukidi	SILVER
8th	2009	(France) Metz	20 km men	1. Giorgio Rubino, 2. Ivano Brugnetti, 3. Jean-Jacques Nkouloukidi, 12. Matteo Giupponi	GOLD
8th	2009	(France) Metz	50 km men	8. Marco De Luca, 11. Diego Cafagna, 19. Fortunato D’Onofrio, DNF Dario Privitera	BRONZE
9th	2011	(Portugal) Olhão	50 km men	2. Marco De Luca, 5. Jean-Jacques Nkouloukidi, 9. Lorenzo Dessi, 10. Teodorico Caporaso	GOLD
9th	2011	(Portugal) Olhão	20 km men	4. Giorgio Rubino, 11. Matteo Giupponi, 12. Federico Tontodonati, DNF Daniele Paris	SILVER
10th	2013	(Slovakia) Dudince			
11th	2015	(Spain) Murcia	Women	2. Eleonora Giorgi, 8. Elisa Rigaudo, 20. Valentina Trapletti, 35. Federica Ferraro	SILVER
11th	2015	(Spain) Murcia	50 km men	3. Marco De Luca, 8. Teodorico Caporaso, 12. Federico Tontodonati	SILVER
12th	2017	(Czech Republic) Poděbrady	Women	1. Antonella Palmisano, 7. Valentina Trapletti, 26. Nicole Colombi, DQ. Sibilla Di Vincenzo	SILVER
12th	2017	(Czech Republic) Poděbrady	50 km men	3. Michele Antonelli, 5. Teodorico Caporaso, 11. Andrea Agrusti, 14. Federico Tontodonati	SILVER
13th	2019	(Lithuania) Alytus	20 km women	6. Eleonora Dominici, 8. Valentina Trapletti, 13. Nicole Colombi, DNF Antonella Palmisano	SILVER
13th	2019	(Lithuania) Alytus	50 km women	1. Eleonora Giorgi, 11. Mariavittoria Becchetti, 15. Federica Curiazzi, 20. Beatrice Foresti	BRONZE
14th	2021	(Czech Republic) Poděbrady	50 km men	3. Andrea Agrusti, 5. Marco De Luca, 15. Michele Antonelli, Stefano Chiesa	GOLD
14th	2021	(Czech Republic) Poděbrady	35 km women	2. Eleonora Giorgi, 3. Lidia Barcella, 8. Federica Curiazzi, 14. Beatrice Foresti	GOLD
14th	2021	(Czech Republic) Poděbrady	20 km men	5. Francesco Fortunato, 8. Massimo Stano, 11. Federico Tontodonati, 12. Matteo Giupponi	SILVER
14th	2021	(Czech Republic) Poděbrady	20 km women	1. Antonella Palmisano, 10. Valentina Trapletti, 12. Nicole Colombi, Mariavittoria Becchetti	BRONZE

== Multiple medalists ==
Still active

=== Men ===
Athlete	Total			Individual			Team		
Athlete	Gold medal	Silver medal	Bronze medal	Gold medal	Silver medal	Bronze medal	Gold medal	Silver medal	Bronze medal
Marco De Luca	2	2	3	0	1	1	2	1	2
Giorgio Rubino	2	2	0	1	0	0	1	2	0
Jean-Jacques Nkouloukidi	2	1	1	0	0	1	2	1	0
Ivano Brugnetti	1	3	0	0	2	0	1	1	0

=== Women ===
Athlete	Total			Individual			Team		
Athlete	Gold medal	Silver medal	Bronze medal	Gold medal	Silver medal	Bronze medal	Gold medal	Silver medal	Bronze medal
Elisabetta Perrone	3	4	1	0	2	1	3	2	0
Eleonora Giorgi	2	3	1	1	2	0	1	1	1
Annarita Sidoti	3	2	0	1	0	0	2	2	0
Rossella Giordano	2	2	0	0	1	0	2	1	0
Erica Alfridi	2	2	0	0	0	0	2	2	0
Antonella Palmisano	2	1	1	2	0	0	0	1	1
Elisa Rigaudo	1	2	2	0	0	2	1	2	0
Gisella Orsini	1	2	0	0	0	0	1	2	0

== See also ==
- Italy national athletics team
- Italy at the World Athletics Race Walking Team Championships
- Italian team at the running events
