= 2006 European 10,000m Cup =

- Organisers: EAA
- Edition: 10th
- Date: 15 April
- Host city: (Turkey) Antalya
- Events: 2

The 2006 European 10,000m Cup, was the 10th edition of the European 10,000m Cup took place on 15 April in Antalya, Turkey.

== Individual ==
=== Men ===
Rank	Athlete	Country	Time	Notes
1st place, gold medalist(s)	Mokhtar Benhari	France	28.47,22	
2nd place, silver medalist(s)	Ricardo Serrano	Spain	28.50,18	(SB)
3rd place, bronze medalist(s)	Ismaïl Sghyr	France	28.51,14	(SB)
4	José Ramos	Portugal	28.52,13	
5	Viktor Röthlin	Switzerland	28.52,86	
6	Marco Mazza	Italy	28.53,47	(SB)
7	André Pollmächer	Germany	28.54,47	
8	Guy Fays	Belgium	28.57,09	
9	Pierre Joncheray	France	28.59,06	
10	Marius Ionescu	Romania	29.01,83	(PB)

=== Women ===
Rank	Athlete	Country	Time	Notes
1st place, gold medalist(s)	Elvan Abeylegesse	Turkey	30.21,67	(NR)
2nd place, silver medalist(s)	Silvia Weissteiner	Italy	32.30,55	(PB)
3rd place, bronze medalist(s)	Krisztina Papp	Hungary	32.31,54	(PB)
4	Christelle Daunay	France	32.35,59	
5	Fatiha Baouf	Belgium	32.36,23	(PB)
6	Nathalie De Vos	Belgium	32.36,84	(PB)
7	Ana Dias	Portugal	32.37,76	(SB)
8	Yamna Oubohou	France	32.39,04	(SB)
9	Anália Rosa	Portugal	32.44,93	(PB)
10	Teresa Recio	Spain	32.45,51	(SB)

== Team ==
In italic the participants whose result did not go into the team's total time, but awarded with medals.

Men
Rank	Nation	Time
1st place, gold medalist(s)	France	1:26.37,42
2nd place, silver medalist(s)	Portugal	1:27.09,16
3rd place, bronze medalist(s)	Italy; Marco Mazza; Gianmarco Buttazzo; Daniele Meucci; Mattia Maccagnan; Gabriele De Nard	1:27.10,52

Women
Rank	Nation	Time
1st place, gold medalist(s)	Belgium	1:38.17,13
2nd place, silver medalist(s)	Italy; Silvia Weissteiner; Renate Rungger; Patrizia Tisi; Deborah Toniolo; Geia Gualtieri	1:38,38,35
3rd place, bronze medalist(s)	Portugal	1:39.05,39
