= 2005 European Race Walking Cup =

- Organisers: EAA
- Edition: 6th
- Date: May 21
- Host city: Miskolc, Northern Hungary, Hungary
- Events: 5
- Participation: 268 athletes from 29 nations

The 2005 European Race Walking Cup was held in Miskolc, Hungary, on May 21, 2005.

Complete results were published. The junior events are documented on the World Junior Athletics History webpages. Medal winners were published on the Athletics Weekly website,

== Medallists ==
Event	Gold		Silver		Bronze	
Men
20 km	Ilya Markov (RUS)	1:20:50	Juan Manuel Molina (ESP)	1:20:54	Vladimir Stankin (RUS)	1:21:28
50 km	Aleksey Voyevodin (RUS)	3:41:03	Sergey Kirdyapkin (RUS)	3:41:11	Yuriy Andronov (RUS)	3:42:34
10 km Junior	Andrey Ruzavin (RUS)	39:57	Giorgio Rubino (ITA)	40:46	Aleksandr Prokhorov (RUS)	41:26
Team (Men)
20 km	Russia	9 pts	Spain	33 pts	Ukraine	42 pts
50 km	Russia	6 pts	France	19 pts	Italy	30 pts
10 km Junior	Russia	4 pts	Germany	11 pts	Belarus	13 pts
Women
20 km	Olimpiada Ivanova (RUS)	1:28:18	Susana Feitor (POR)	1:29:01	Elisa Rigaudo (ITA)	1:29:26
10 km Junior	Vera Sokolova (RUS)	44:09	Tatyana Kalmykova (RUS)	45:02	Aliona Rusak (BLR)	46:37
Team (Women)
20 km	Portugal	25 pts	Italy	26 pts	Romania	30 pts
10 km Junior	Russia	3 pts	Belarus	8 pts	Italy	23 pts

== Results ==
=== Men's 20 km ===
Place	Athlete	Nation	Time
1st place, gold medalist(s)	Ilya Markov	Russia (RUS)	1:20:50
2nd place, silver medalist(s)	Juan Manuel Molina	Spain (ESP)	1:20:54
3rd place, bronze medalist(s)	Vladimir Stankin	Russia (RUS)	1:21:28
4	Andriy Yurin	Ukraine (UKR)	1:22:13
5	Stepan Yudin	Russia (RUS)	1:22:20
6	Roman Magdiarczyk	Poland (POL)	1:22:26
7	Silviu Casandra	Romania (ROU)	1:23:00
8	Erik Tysse	Norway (NOR)	1:23:04
9	Grzegorz Sudoł	Poland (POL)	1:23:17
10	Andrei Talaskha	Belarus (BLR)	1:23:49
11	Lorenzo Civallero	Italy (ITA)	1:23:55
12	Matej Tóth	Slovakia (SVK)	1:23:58
13	Artem Valchenko	Ukraine (UKR)	1:24:03
14	Jesús Ángel García	Spain (ESP)	1:24:05
15	Robert Heffernan	Ireland (IRL)	1:24:20
16	Trond Nymark	Norway (NOR)	1:25:02
17	Benjamin Sánchez	Spain (ESP)	1:25:45
18	Gyula Dudás	Hungary (HUN)	1:25:50
19	José David Domínguez	Spain (ESP)	1:26:01
20	Michele Didoni	Italy (ITA)	1:26:59
21	Maik Berger	Germany (GER)	1:27:11
22	Frank Delree	France (FRA)	1:28:07
23	Miloš Holuša	Czech Republic (CZE)	1:28:23
24	Cédric Houssaye	France (FRA)	1:29:49
25	Andriy Kovenko	Ukraine (UKR)	1:30:07
26	Martin Pupiš	Slovakia (SVK)	1:30:36
27	Anton Kučmín	Slovakia (SVK)	1:30:48
28	Vilius Mikelionis	Lithuania (LTU)	1:30:54
29	Róbert Tubak	Hungary (HUN)	1:30:55
30	Frank Werner	Germany (GER)	1:31:00
31	Aliaksandr Kuzmin	Belarus (BLR)	1:31:17
32	Konstadínos Stefanópoulos	Greece (GRE)	1:31:26
33	Hervé Davaux	France (FRA)	1:32:01
34	Recep Çelik	Turkey (TUR)	1:32:05
35	Donatas Škarnulis	Lithuania (LTU)	1:32:12
36	Mikalai Seradovich	Belarus (BLR)	1:32:32
37	Eddy Roze	France (FRA)	1:32:38
38	Oleksandr Venhlovskyy	Ukraine (UKR)	1:32:47
39	Vladimir Savanović	Serbia and Montenegro (SCG)	1:32:59
40	Jarkko Kinnunen	Finland (FIN)	1:34:00
41	Bruno Grandjean	Switzerland (SUI)	1:35:39
42	Marius Žiūkas	Lithuania (LTU)	1:36:25
43	Levente Kapéri	Hungary (HUN)	1:37:43
44	Pavel Svoboda	Czech Republic (CZE)	1:39:20
45	Frank Buytaert	Belgium (BEL)	1:39:22
46	Tadas Šuškevičius	Lithuania (LTU)	1:41:20
47	Margus Luik	Estonia (EST)	1:41:56
48	Veysi Aslan	Turkey (TUR)	1:43:21
49	Attila Csont	Hungary (HUN)	1:48:29
—	Ivan Trotski	Belarus (BLR)	DQ
—	Colin Griffin	Ireland (IRL)	DQ
—	Rafał Augustyn	Poland (POL)	DQ
—	Fabio Ruzzier	Slovenia (SLO)	DQ
—	Dominic King	Great Britain (GBR)	DQ
—	Jiří Malysa	Czech Republic (CZE)	DQ
—	Ondrej Kocúr	Slovakia (SVK)	DQ
—	Ivano Brugnetti	Italy (ITA)	DQ
—	Vladimir Parvatkin	Russia (RUS)	DNF
—	Benjamin Kuciński	Poland (POL)	DNF
—	Alessandro Gandellini	Italy (ITA)	DNF
—	João Vieira	Portugal (POR)	DNF
—	Jan Albrecht	Germany (GER)	DNF

==== Team (20 km Men) ====
Place	Country	Points
1st place, gold medalist(s)	Russia	9 pts
2nd place, silver medalist(s)	Spain	33 pts
3rd place, bronze medalist(s)	Ukraine	42 pts
4	Slovakia	65 pts
5	Belarus	77 pts
6	France	79 pts
7	Hungary	90 pts
8	Lithuania	105 pts

=== Men's 50 km ===
Place	Athlete	Nation	Time
1st place, gold medalist(s)	Aleksey Voyevodin	Russia (RUS)	3:41:03
2nd place, silver medalist(s)	Sergey Kirdyapkin	Russia (RUS)	3:41:11
3rd place, bronze medalist(s)	Yuriy Andronov	Russia (RUS)	3:42:34
4	Yohan Diniz	France (FRA)	3:45:17
5	Denis Langlois	France (FRA)	3:47:31
6	Alex Schwazer	Italy (ITA)	3:49:42
7	Peter Korčok	Slovakia (SVK)	3:51:30
8	Andrei Stepanchuk	Belarus (BLR)	3:51:40
9	Miloš Bátovský	Slovakia (SVK)	3:54:49
10	David Boulanger	France (FRA)	3:55:11
11	Diego Cafagna	Italy (ITA)	3:55:18
12	Viktor Ginko	Belarus (BLR)	3:55:22
13	Marco De Luca	Italy (ITA)	3:55:30
14	Rafał Fedaczyński	Poland (POL)	3:56:13
15	Alessandro Mistretta	Italy (ITA)	3:56:32
16	Oleksiy Kazanin	Ukraine (UKR)	3:56:44
17	Fredrik Svensson	Sweden (SWE)	3:57:16
18	Aleksandar Raković	Serbia and Montenegro (SCG)	3:57:30
19	Antti Kempas	Finland (FIN)	3:59:01
20	Pedro Martins	Portugal (POR)	4:03:28
21	António Pereira	Portugal (POR)	4:04:22
22	Oleksiy Shelest	Ukraine (UKR)	4:05:18
23	Mario Avellaneda	Spain (ESP)	4:05:42
24	Augusto Cardoso	Portugal (POR)	4:05:58
25	Modris Liepiņš	Latvia (LAT)	4:06:26
26	Zoltán Czukor	Hungary (HUN)	4:07:39
27	Daugvinas Zujus	Lithuania (LTU)	4:08:18
28	Yuriy Burban	Ukraine (UKR)	4:11:18
29	Aleksandr Andrushevskiy	Belarus (BLR)	4:12:06
30	Uģis Brūvelis	Latvia (LAT)	4:13:12
31	José Ignacio Díaz	Spain (ESP)	4:16:30
32	Yeóryios Aryirópoulos	Greece (GRE)	4:17:09
33	Vitaliy Talankou	Belarus (BLR)	4:18:53
34	Jorge Costa	Portugal (POR)	4:19:11
35	Nicolas Perrier	Switzerland (SUI)	4:19:42
36	Oleksandr Romanenko	Ukraine (UKR)	4:26:32
37	Juris Koniševs	Latvia (LAT)	4:50:04
—	Aigars Fadejevs	Latvia (LAT)	DQ
—	Eddy Riva	France (FRA)	DQ
—	Maciej Rosiewicz	Poland (POL)	DQ
—	Attila Fülöp	Hungary (HUN)	DQ
—	Francisco José Pinardo	Spain (ESP)	DQ
—	Anatolijus Launikonys	Lithuania (LTU)	DQ
—	Péter Domján	Hungary (HUN)	DNF
—	Kamil Kalka	Poland (POL)	DNF
—	Vladimir Kanaykin	Russia (RUS)	DNF
—	José Antonio González	Spain (ESP)	DNF
—	Theódoros Stamatópoulos	Greece (GRE)	DNF
—	Michał Jarosz	Poland (POL)	DNF
—	Bengt Bengtsson	Sweden (SWE)	DNF
—	János Tóth	Hungary (HUN)	DNF
—	Urbain Girod	Switzerland (SUI)	DNF
—	André Höhne	Germany (GER)	DNF
—	Jani Lehtinen	Finland (FIN)	DNF
—	Spirídon Kastánis	Greece (GRE)	DNF

==== Team (50 km Men) ====
Place	Country	Points
1st place, gold medalist(s)	Russia	6 pts
2nd place, silver medalist(s)	France	19 pts
3rd place, bronze medalist(s)	Italy	30 pts
4	Belarus	49 pts
5	Portugal	65 pts
6	Ukraine	66 pts
7	Latvia	92 pts

=== Men's 10 km Junior ===
Place	Athlete	Nation	Time
1st place, gold medalist(s)	Andrey Ruzavin	Russia (RUS)	39:57
2nd place, silver medalist(s)	Giorgio Rubino	Italy (ITA)	40:46
3rd place, bronze medalist(s)	Aleksandr Prokhorov	Russia (RUS)	41:26
4	Carsten Schmidt	Germany (GER)	41:31
5	Dzianis Simanovich	Belarus (BLR)	42:04
6	Ruslan Dmytrenko	Ukraine (UKR)	42:15
7	Hannes Tonat	Germany (GER)	42:24
8	Vadzim Tsivanchuk	Belarus (BLR)	42:30
9	Ingus Janevics	Latvia (LAT)	42:30
10	Ioánnis Kafkás	Greece (GRE)	43:33
11	Miguel Ángel López	Spain (ESP)	43:47
12	Yuriy Tsiporenko	Ukraine (UKR)	43:54
13	Jakub Hudák	Slovakia (SVK)	43:54
14	Serhiy Chkhan	Ukraine (UKR)	44:00
15	Vitali Boyarchenko	Belarus (BLR)	44:24
16	Dušan Majdan	Slovakia (SVK)	44:38
17	Tibor Márta	Hungary (HUN)	44:39
18	Nicholas Ball	Great Britain (GBR)	44:58
19	Szabolcs Glázer	Hungary (HUN)	45:04
20	Sándor Rácz	Hungary (HUN)	45:11
21	Alexandros Papamihail	Greece (GRE)	45:29
22	Rafał Sikora	Poland (POL)	45:37
23	Andrea Romanelli	Italy (ITA)	45:46
24	Matteo Giupponi	Italy (ITA)	45:50
25	Peter Gróf	Slovakia (SVK)	45:59
26	Arnis Rumbenieks	Latvia (LAT)	46:47
27	Vytautas Verseckas	Lithuania (LTU)	47:26
28	Vít Hrdlička	Czech Republic (CZE)	47:37
29	Francisco Espinosa	Spain (ESP)	47:44
30	Benjamin Schmitt	France (FRA)	48:04
31	Abdurrahim Çelik	Turkey (TUR)	48:09
32	Jonathan Latouche	France (FRA)	48:43
33	Martins Pastars	Latvia (LAT)	48:43
34	Kirilas Griazevas	Lithuania (LTU)	49:07
35	Olivier Collette	Belgium (BEL)	49:15
36	Risko Nogelainen	Estonia (EST)	50:24
37	Jonathan Hersent	France (FRA)	50:43
38	Andreas Nielsen	Denmark (DEN)	50:55
39	Anton Vileito	Estonia (EST)	55:16
—	Vassilios Chryssikos	Greece (GRE)	DQ
—	Pavelas Veličko	Lithuania (LTU)	DQ
—	Michał Dominiak	Poland (POL)	DQ
—	Paweł Krawczyk	Poland (POL)	DQ
—	Aleksey Grigoryev	Russia (RUS)	DQ
—	Casper Hansson	Denmark (DEN)	DNF

==== Team (10 km Junior Men) ====
Place	Country	Points
1st place, gold medalist(s)	Russia	4 pts
2nd place, silver medalist(s)	Germany	11 pts
3rd place, bronze medalist(s)	Belarus	13 pts
4	Ukraine	18 pts
5	Italy	25 pts
6	Slovakia	29 pts
7	Greece	31 pts
8	Latvia	35 pts
9	Hungary	36 pts
10	Spain	40 pts
11	Lithuania	61 pts
12	France	62 pts
13	Estonia	75 pts

=== Women's 20 km ===
Place	Athlete	Nation	Time
1st place, gold medalist(s)	Olimpiada Ivanova	Russia (RUS)	1:28:18
2nd place, silver medalist(s)	Susana Feitor	Portugal (POR)	1:29:01
3rd place, bronze medalist(s)	Elisa Rigaudo	Italy (ITA)	1:29:26
4	Claudia Ștef	Romania (ROU)	1:30:11
5	Yuliya Voyevodina	Russia (RUS)	1:30:34
6	Sabine Zimmer	Germany (GER)	1:30:57
7	Vera Santos	Portugal (POR)	1:31:58
8	Natalya Misyulya	Belarus (BLR)	1:32:03
9	Maria Teresa Gargallo	Spain (ESP)	1:32:16
10	Gisella Orsini	Italy (ITA)	1:32:23
11	Ana Maria Groza	Romania (ROU)	1:32:40
12	Zuzana Malíková	Slovakia (SVK)	1:32:48
13	Rossella Giordano	Italy (ITA)	1:32:57
14	Kristina Saltanovič	Lithuania (LTU)	1:33:15
15	Norica Cimpean	Romania (ROU)	1:33:30
16	Maribel Gonçalves	Portugal (POR)	1:34:07
17	Inês Henriques	Portugal (POR)	1:35:12
18	María José Poves	Spain (ESP)	1:35:31
19	Mária Galiková	Slovakia (SVK)	1:35:32
20	Jolanta Dukure	Latvia (LAT)	1:35:55
21	Vira Zozulya	Ukraine (UKR)	1:36:20
22	Valentina Tsybulskaya	Belarus (BLR)	1:36:34
23	Sonata Milušauskaitė	Lithuania (LTU)	1:36:49
24	Evaggelia Xinou	Greece (GRE)	1:36:52
25	Beatriz Pascual	Spain (ESP)	1:37:19
26	Melanie Seeger	Germany (GER)	1:37:41
27	Christine Guinaudeau	France (FRA)	1:37:56
28	Maria Hatzipanayiotidou	Greece (GRE)	1:37:56
29	Lyudmila Yegorova	Ukraine (UKR)	1:38:17
30	Yeliz Ay	Turkey (TUR)	1:38:38
31	Marie Polli	Switzerland (SUI)	1:38:58
32	Nadiya Prokopuk	Ukraine (UKR)	1:39:51
33	Tatyana Denize	France (FRA)	1:40:07
34	Agnieszka Olesz	Poland (POL)	1:41:31
35	Patricia Garnier	France (FRA)	1:41:41
36	Laura Polli	Switzerland (SUI)	1:42:53
37	Outi Silenpää	Finland (FIN)	1:43:30
38	Katarzyna Kwoka	Poland (POL)	1:43:53
39	Ildikó Ilyés	Hungary (HUN)	1:44:09
40	Neringa Aidietytė	Lithuania (LTU)	1:45:18
41	Modra Ignate	Latvia (LAT)	1:47:17
42	Eszter Gerendási	Hungary (HUN)	1:48:57
43	Agnieszka Dygacz	Poland (POL)	1:50:06
44	Orsolya Zupkone Gruber	Hungary (HUN)	1:50:22
45	Svetlana Zuravlova	Latvia (LAT)	1:50:47
46	Johanna Jackson	Great Britain (GBR)	1:53:34
47	Hana Heberová	Czech Republic (CZE)	1:57:52
48	Monika Schwantzer	Austria (AUT)	2:11:33
—	Elena Ginko	Belarus (BLR)	DQ
—	Tatyana Kozlova	Russia (RUS)	DQ
—	Cristiana Pellino	Italy (ITA)	DQ
—	Monica Svensson	Sweden (SWE)	DQ
—	Dóra Nemere	Hungary (HUN)	DQ
—	Rocío Florido	Spain (ESP)	DQ
—	Irayda Pudovkina	Russia (RUS)	DQ
—	Lenka Židková	Czech Republic (CZE)	DNF
—	Brigita Virbalytė	Lithuania (LTU)	DNF
—	Olive Loughnane	Ireland (IRL)	DNF
—	Handan Çavdar	Turkey (TUR)	DNF
—	Fatiha Ouali	France (FRA)	DNF
—	Ryta Turava	Belarus (BLR)	DNF
—	Fatma Ormeci	Turkey (TUR)	DNF
—	Athina Papayianni	Greece (GRE)	DNF
—	Beata Bodzioch	Poland (POL)	DNF
—	Daniela Cirlan	Romania (ROU)	DNF
—	Tiina Muinonen	Finland (FIN)	DNS

==== Team (20 km Women) ====
Place	Country	Points
1st place, gold medalist(s)	Portugal	25 pts
2nd place, silver medalist(s)	Italy	26 pts
3rd place, bronze medalist(s)	Romania	30 pts
4	Spain	52 pts
5	Lithuania	77 pts
6	Ukraine	82 pts
7	France	95 pts
8	Latvia	106 pts
9	Poland	115 pts
10	Hungary	125 pts

=== Women's 10 km Junior ===
Place	Athlete	Nation	Time
1st place, gold medalist(s)	Vera Sokolova	Russia (RUS)	44:09
2nd place, silver medalist(s)	Tatyana Kalmykova	Russia (RUS)	45:02
3rd place, bronze medalist(s)	Aliona Rusak	Belarus (BLR)	46:37
4	Aleksandra Kubasova	Russia (RUS)	47:19
5	Hanna Drabenia	Belarus (BLR)	48:47
6	Martina Gabrielli	Italy (ITA)	49:21
7	Klara Malíková	Slovakia (SVK)	49:39
8	Ann Loughnane	Ireland (IRL)	49:50
9	Narin Sağlam	Turkey (TUR)	50:05
10	Olena Shevchuk	Ukraine (UKR)	50:13
11	Lucie Pelantová	Czech Republic (CZE)	50:15
12	Ivett Erdős	Hungary (HUN)	50:28
13	Fátima Rodrigues	Portugal (POR)	50:30
14	Paulina Buziak	Poland (POL)	50:38
15	Svitlana Vavilova	Ukraine (UKR)	50:50
16	Raquel González	Spain (ESP)	51:19
17	Sabrina Trevisan	Italy (ITA)	51:38
18	Kati Penttinen	Finland (FIN)	51:49
19	Nina Kovalchuk	Ukraine (UKR)	52:03
20	Catarina Godinho	Portugal (POR)	52:13
21	Lorena Castrillo	Spain (ESP)	52:14
22	Karolina Kaasalainen	Finland (FIN)	52:25
23	Krisztina Kernács	Hungary (HUN)	52:34
24	Laura Reynolds	Ireland (IRL)	52:52
25	Alba Sánchez	Spain (ESP)	52:58
26	Emilie Saint-Maxent	France (FRA)	53:20
27	Aleksandra Kubisiewicz	Poland (POL)	53:24
28	Maud Montaletang	France (FRA)	53:50
29	Katalin Varró	Hungary (HUN)	53:55
30	Bernadeta Juozaityte	Lithuania (LTU)	54:53
31	Agnieszka Deska	Poland (POL)	55:19
32	Rita Kaselyte	Lithuania (LTU)	55:24
33	Julie Svobodová	Czech Republic (CZE)	55:55
34	Heidi Bouchery	France (FRA)	56:20
35	Ragle Raudsepp	Estonia (EST)	1:01:56
36	Caroline Housmans	Belgium (BEL)	1:02:52
37	Darja Komersantova	Estonia (EST)	1:04:34
—	Rebecca Mersh	Great Britain (GBR)	DQ
—	Volha Mazuronak	Belarus (BLR)	DQ
—	Maija Sippola	Finland (FIN)	DNF

==== Team (10 km Junior Women) ====
Place	Country	Points
1st place, gold medalist(s)	Russia	3 pts
2nd place, silver medalist(s)	Belarus	8 pts
3rd place, bronze medalist(s)	Italy	23 pts
4	Ukraine	25 pts
5	Ireland	32 pts
6	Portugal	33 pts
7	Hungary	35 pts
8	Spain	37 pts
9	Finland	40 pts
10	Poland	41 pts
11	Czech Republic	44 pts
12	France	54 pts
13	Lithuania	62 pts
14	Estonia	72 pts

== Participation ==
The participation of 268 athletes ( men/ women) from 29 countries is reported.

- Austria (1)
- Belarus (18)
- Belgium (3)
- Czech Republic (8)
- Denmark (2)
- Estonia (5)
- Finland (8)
- France (18)
- Germany (8)
- Greece (10)
- Hungary (18)
- Ireland (5)
- Italy (17)
- Latvia (10)
- Lithuania (15)
- Norway (2)
- Poland (18)
- Portugal (11)
- Romania (5)
- Russia (18)
- Serbia and Montenegro (2)
- Slovakia (12)
- Slovenia (1)
- Spain (17)
- Sweden (3)
- Switzerland (5)
- Turkey (7)
- Ukraine (17)
- United Kingdom (4)
