= 2007 European 10,000m Cup =

- Organisers: EAA
- Edition: 11th
- Date: 7 April
- Host city: (Italy) Ferrara
- Events: 2

The 2007 European 10,000m Cup, was the 11th edition of the European 10,000m Cup took place on 7 April in Ferarra, Italy.

== Individual ==
=== Men ===
| Rank | Athlete | Country | Time | Notes |
|---|---|---|---|---|
| 1st place, gold medalist(s) | André Pollmächer | Germany | 28:17.17 | (PB) |
| 2nd place, silver medalist(s) | Günther Weidlinger | Austria | 28:19.11 | (PB) |
| 3rd place, bronze medalist(s) | Carles Castillejo | Spain | 28:32.70 | (SB) |
| 4 | Vasyl Matviychuk | Ukraine | 28:34.98 | (SB) |
| 5 | Rui Pedro Silva | Portugal | 28:56.66 | (PB) |
| 6 | Daniele Meucci | Italy | 28:56.70 | (SB) |
| 7 | Iván Hierro | Spain | 29:05.68 | (SB) |
| 8 | Sander Schutgens | Netherlands | 29:07.41 | (SB) |
| 9 | José Ríos | Spain | 29:16.71 | (SB) |
| 10 | Gian Marco Buttazzo | Italy | 29:17.10 | (SB) |

=== Women ===
| Rank | Athlete | Country | Time | Notes |
|---|---|---|---|---|
| 1st place, gold medalist(s) | Elvan Abeylegesse | Turkey | 31:25.15 | (SB) |
| 2nd place, silver medalist(s) | Tetyana Holovchenko | Ukraine | 31:59.98 | (PB) |
| 3rd place, bronze medalist(s) | Nathalie De Vos | Belgium | 32:07.62 | (SB) |
| 4 | Jo Pavey | United Kingdom | 32:21.19 | (PB) |
| 5 | Rosa María Morató | Spain | 32:23.61 | (PB) |
| 6 | Fatna Maraoui | Italy | 33:05.79 | (PB) |
| 7 | Isabel Checa | Spain | 33:09.19 | (PB) |
| 8 | Silvia Sommaggio | Italy | 33:14.97 | (SB) |
| 9 | Renate Rungger | Italy | 33:19.75 | (SB) |
| 10 | María Elena Moreno | Spain | 33:29.43 | (SB) |

== Team ==
In italic the participants whose result did not go into the team's total time, but awarded with medals.

Men
| Rank | Nation | Time |
|---|---|---|
| 1st place, gold medalist(s) | Spain | 1:26.55,09 |
| 2nd place, silver medalist(s) | Italy; Daniele Meucci; Gianmarco Buttazzo; Fabio Mascheroni; Mattia Maccagnan; Cosimo Caliandro | 1:27.44,24 |
| 3rd place, bronze medalist(s) | Portugal | 1:27.48,78 |

Women
| Rank | Nation | Time |
|---|---|---|
| 1st place, gold medalist(s) | Spain | 1:39.02,23 |
| 2nd place, silver medalist(s) | Italy; Fatna Maraoui; Silvia Sommaggio; Renate Rungger; Sara Dossena; Anna Incerti | 1:39.40,51 |
