= Massimo Quiriconi =

Personal information
- Nationality: Italian
- Born: January 8, 1963 (age 63) Ponte Buggianese, Italy
- Height: 1.82 m (5 ft 11 1/2 in)
- Weight: 60 kg (130 lb)

Sport
- Country: Italy
- Sport: Athletics
- Event: Race walk
- Club: G.S. Fiamme Gialle

Achievements and titles
- Personal best: 50 km walk: 3:55.14 (1993)
Medal record
World Race Walking Cup
Gold medal – first place	1991 San Josè	Combined Team
Silver medal – second place	1993 Monterrey	20 km Team
Bronze medal – third place	1985 St. John's	Combined Team
Bronze medal – third place	1993 Monterrey	Combined Team

Massimo Quiriconi (born 8 January 1963) is a former Italian race walker.

== Biography ==
He competed for his native country at the 1992 Summer Olympics, finishing in 13th place in the men's 50 km walk event. Pezzatini set his personal best (3:55.14) in the men's 50 km walk event in 1993.

== Progression ==
50 km walk

Year	Performance	Venue	Date	World Rank
1997	4:18:04	(Italy) Pescara	02 FEB	
1993	3:55:14		01 JAN	

== Achievements ==
Year	Competition	Venue	Position	Notes
1985	World Race Walking Cup	St John's, Isle of Man	10th	50 km
1991	World Race Walking Cup	San Jose, United States	18th	50 km
1992	Olympic Games	Barcelona, Spain	13th	50 km
1993	World Race Walking Cup	Monterrey, Mexico	14th	50 km
1993	World Championships	Stuttgart, Germany	15th	50 km

== See also ==
- Italian team at the running events
- Italy at the IAAF World Race Walking Cup
