= Daniele Meucci =

Italian long-distance runner (born 1985)

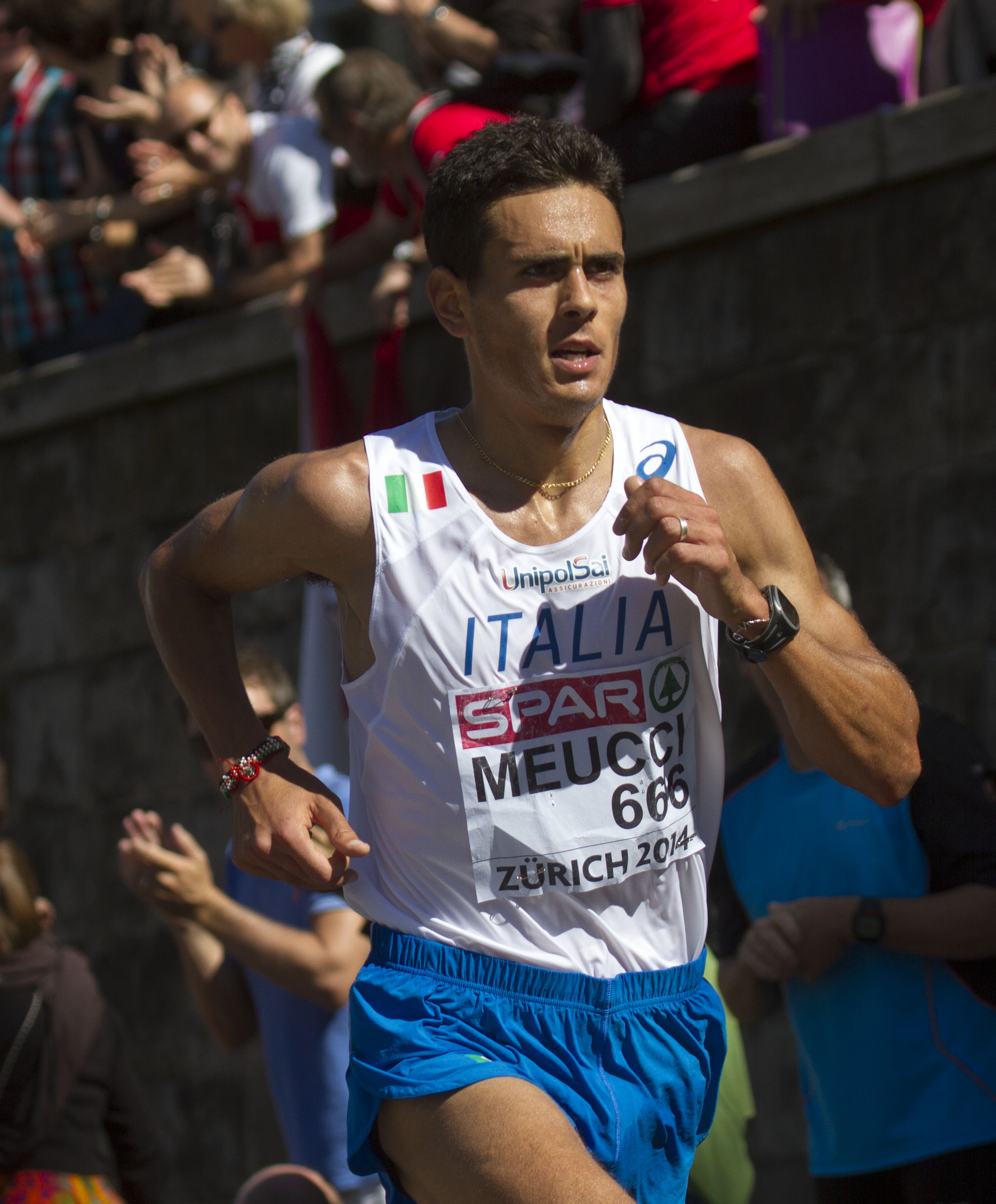

Personal information
- National team: Italy (34 caps)
- Born: 7 October 1985 (age 41) Pisa, Italy
- Height: 1.78 m (5 ft 10 in)
- Weight: 62 kg (137 lb)

Sport
- Country: Italy
- Sport: Athletics
- Event: Long distance
- Club: C.S. Esercito

Achievements and titles
- Personal bests: 5000m: 13:19.00 (2012); 10,000m: 27:32.86 (2012); Marathon: 2:07:49 (2024); 10k: 28:08 (2020)
Medal record
Senior level (individual)
Event	1st	2nd	3rd
European Championships	2	1	2
European Cross Country C'ships	0	0	1
European Team Championships	0	0	2
European 10,000m Cup	1	0	0
Total	3	1	5
Senior level (team)
Event	1st	2nd	3rd
European Cross Country C'ships	0	0	3
European Half Marathon Cup	0	0	1
European 10,000m Cup	2	1	2
Total	2	1	6
Youth level (individual)
Event	1st	2nd	3rd
European U23 Championships	0	0	1
European Cross Country C'ships	0	0	1
Total	0	0	2
Youth level (team)
Event	1st	2nd	3rd
European Cross Country C'ships	0	1	0
European Championships
Gold medal – first place	2014 Zürich	Marathon
Gold medal – first place	2024 Rome	Half marathon team
Silver medal – second place	2012 Helsinki	10,000 m
Bronze medal – third place	2010 Barcelona	10,000 m
Bronze medal – third place	2016 Amsterdam	Half marathon
Bronze medal – third place	2016 Amsterdam	Half marathon team
European Cross Country Championships
Bronze medal – third place	2012 Budapest	Cross country
European 10,000m Cup
Gold medal – first place	2016 Mersin	10,000 m

Daniele Meucci (born 7 October 1985) is an Italian athlete who specialises in long-distance running, including track running, cross country and road running who won twenty medals at international level (seventeen at senior level and three at youth level).

He represented Italy at the 2012 Summer Olympics, running in the 5000 metres and 10,000 metres. Meucci is a three-time medallist in the latter event at the European Athletics Championships, having won bronze in 2010 and 2016 and silver in 2012. He was also a bronze medallist at the European Cross Country Championships in 2012. He has competed at five World Championships in Athletics (2009 and 2011 in the 5000 m, 2011, 2013 and 2017 in the 10000 m and 2015 in the marathon).

== Biography ==
=== Early career ===
Born in Pisa, he began competing internationally in 2006 and was fourteen at the European Cup 10000m and improved to tenth place in the 10000 metres at the 2006 European Athletics Championships. He won a bronze medal and a team silver medal at under-23 level at that year's European Cross Country Championships, which was held in San Giorgio su Legnano. The following year he was sixth at the 2007 European Cup 10000m in Ferrara and won the 10,000 m bronze at the 2007 European Athletics U23 Championships.

He represented Italy on the world stage for the first time in 2008, but he only managed 99th place in the senior race at the 2008 IAAF World Cross Country Championships. He had greater success at European level that year, again taking sixth in the European Cup race and finishing twelfth in the senior race at the 2008 European Cross Country Championships.

Meucci took up road running in 2009 and was fifth at the Stramilano Half Marathon with a time of 1:02:56. He returned to the track in the summer and took on the shorter 3000 metres at the 2009 European Team Championships, winning a bronze medal. Two months later he competed on the global track stage for the first time but he did not progress out of the 5000 metres heats at the 2009 World Championships in Athletics. Demonstrating his versatility over different surfaces, he was 18th at the 2009 IAAF World Half Marathon Championships on the streets of Birmingham in October (recording a personal best 1:02:43) and led the Italians to the team bronze with a ninth-place finish at the 2009 European Cross Country Championships.

=== Prime and later years ===
The Italian slightly improved his half marathon best with a 1:02:41 run for fifth at the 2010 Roma Ostia Half Marathon, and he ran his first full-length marathon at the Rome City Marathon soon after, where he was eleventh overall. He won his first major medal later that year at the 2010 European Athletics Championships. In the men's 10,000 m he headed to the line after winner Mo Farah, but Chris Thompson just pipped Meucci at the line, leaving the Italian with a bronze medal.

The following year he managed only eleventh in the 3000 m at the 2011 European Athletics Indoor Championships He was beaten to the 2011 national title in the 5000 m by Stefano La Rosa, but set a personal best in the 10,000 m as a guest at the UK Championships, completing the distance in a time of 27:44.50 minutes. He represented Italy in both long-distance track events at the 2011 World Championships in Athletics, coming twelfth over 10,000 m and tenth in the 5000 m. After the championships, a half marathon best (1:02:30 hours) came at the Udine Half Marathon and then he was runner-up behind Edwin Soi at the Giro al Sas 10K race. He began 2012 with a third-place finish at the Great Ireland Run.

In April 2012 he set his new personal best on 10,000 m in Palo Alto, California, with time 27:32.86 and qualified for 2012 Olympic team. A month later he ran in the UAE Healthy Kidney 10K road race in New York and was a surprise winner in 28:28 minutes – a personal best. He ran in both the 5000 m and 10,000 m at the 2012 European Athletics Championships: although he came fifth over the shorter distance, he managed a 10,000 m silver medal behind Kenyan-born Polat Kemboi Arıkan. He also doubled up at the 2012 London Olympics, where he was eliminated in the 5000 m and ranked 24th in the 10,000 m. In August he ran personal bests on the 2012 IAAF Diamond League circuit, running 7:41.74 for the 3000 m at the DN Galan and 8:28.28 minutes for the Two miles at the Birmingham Grand Prix. His season ended with two further European medals at the 2012 European Cross Country Championships, where he was the bronze medallist individually and in the team competition, alongside the race winner Andrea Lalli.

He knocked almost a minute and a half off his best at the 2013 NYC Half Marathon, coming second only to Wilson Kipsang in a time of 61:06 minutes. At the 2014 European Championships, he finished in 6th in the 10000 m and won the men's marathon. At the 2015 World Championships, he competed in the marathon, finishing in 8th place.

In 2019, he competed in the men's marathon at the 2019 World Athletics Championships held in Doha, Qatar. He did not finish his race.

He finished 8th in the 2023 New York City Marathon, running 2:13:29.

== Personal bests ==
- 1500 metres: 3:47.32 (2006)
- 3000 metres: 7:41.74 (2012)
- Two miles: 8:28.28 (2012)
- 5000 metres: 13:19.00 (2012)
- 10,000 metres: 27:32.86 (2012)
- 10 km: 28:08 (2020) - national record
- Half marathon: 1:01:05 (2013)
- Marathon: 2:10:45 (2018)

== Achievements ==
Year	Competition	Venue	Event	Position	Time
2005	European U23 Championships	(Germany) Erfurt	10,000 m	14th	30:43.41
2006	European 10,000m Cup	(Turkey) Antalya	10,000 m	14th	29:09.27
2006	European 10,000m Cup	(Turkey) Antalya	Team	3rd	1:27:10.52
2006	European Championships	(Sweden) Gothenburg	10,000 m	10th	28:48.30
2006	European Cross-Country Championships	(Italy) San Giorgio su Legnano	Youth race	3rd	23:16
2006	European Cross-Country Championships	(Italy) San Giorgio su Legnano	Team	2nd	
2007	European 10,000m Cup	(Italy) Ferrara	10,000 m	6th	28:56.70
2007	European 10,000m Cup	(Italy) Ferrara	Team	2nd	1:27:44-24
2007	European U23 Championships	(Hungary) Debrecen	10,000 m	3rd	29:18.26
2008	World Cross-Country Championships	(United Kingdom) Edinburgh	12 km	99th	38:28
2008	European Cup	(France) Annecy	5000 m	3rd	14: 03.04
2008	European 10,000m Cup	(Turkey) Istanbul	10,000 m	6th	28:56.53
2008	European 10,000m Cup	(Turkey) Istanbul	Team	3rd	1:28:36.56
2008	European Cross-Country Championships	(Belgium) Brussels	10 km	12th	31:41
2009	European Team Championships	(Portugal) Leiria	3000 m	3rd	8:02.22
2009	World Championships	(Germany) Berlin	5000 m	heat	13:37.79
2009	World Half Marathon Championships	(United Kingdom) Birmingham	half marathon	18th	62:43
2009	European Cross-Country Championships	(Republic of Ireland) Dublin	9 km	9th	31:42
2009	European Cross-Country Championships	(Republic of Ireland) Dublin	Team	3rd	
2010	European 10,000m Cup	(France) Marseille	10,000 m	8th	28:39.05
2010	European Team Championship	(Norway) Bergen	5000 m	5th	13:56.95
2010	European Championships	(Spain) Barcelona	10,000 m	3rd	28:27.33
2010	European Championships	(Spain) Barcelona	5000 m	6th	13:40.17
2010	Continental Cup	(Croatia) Split	3000 m	7th	7:57.98
2011	European Indoor Championships	(France) Paris	3000 m	11th	8:04.82
2012	European Championships	(Finland) Helsinki	10,000 m	2nd	28:22.73
2012	Olympic Games	(United Kingdom) London	10,000 m	24th	28:57.46
2012	Olympic Games	(United Kingdom) London	5000 m	heat	13:28.71
2012	European Cross-Country Championships	(Hungary) Budapest	Senior race	3rd	30:13
2012	European Cross-Country Championships	(Hungary) Budapest	Team	3rd	
2013	European Team Championships	(United Kingdom) Gateshead	3000 m	9th	8:06.46
2013	Mediterranean Games	(Turkey) Mersin	5000 m	4th	13: 45.12
2013	World Championships	(Russia) Moscow	10,000 m	19th	28: 06.74
2014	Half Marathon World Championships	(Denmark) Copenhagen	Half marathon	27th	61:57
2014	European Championships	(Switzerland) Zurich	10,000 m	6th	28: 19.79
2014	European Championships	(Switzerland) Zurich	Marathon	1st	2:11:08
2015	World Championships	(China) Beijing	Marathon	8th	2:14:54
2016	European 10,000m Cup	(Turkey) Mersin	10,000 m	1st	28:24.71
2016	European 10,000m Cup	(Turkey) Mersin	Team	1st	
2016	European Championships	(Netherlands) Amsterdam	Half marathon	3rd	1:02:38
2016	European Championships	(Netherlands) Amsterdam	Team	3rd	
2017	World Championships	(United Kingdom) London	Marathon	5th	2:10.56
2018	European Cross-Country Championships	(Netherlands) Tilburg	Team	3rd	
2019	European 10,000m Cup	(United Kingdom) London	10,000 m	17th	28:38.35 SB
2019	European 10,000m Cup	(United Kingdom) London	Team	1st	1:24:25.02

== National titles ==
He won 10 national championships at senior level.

- Italian Athletics Championships
  - 5000 m: 2007, 2008 (2)
  - 10,000 m: 2006, 2007, 2010 (3)
  - Half marathon: 2014 (1)
- Italian Athletics Indoor Championships
  - 3000 m: 2008, 2009 (2)
- Italian Cross Country Championships
  - Long race: 2011, 2017 (2)

== See also ==
- Italian all-time top lists - 5000 metres
- Italian all-time top lists - 10000 metres
- Italian team at the running events
- List of Italian records in athletics
