= Maria Grazia Cogoli =

Italian racewalker (born 1962)

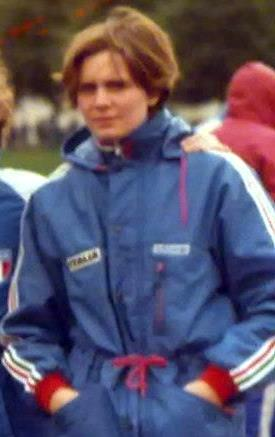

Personal information
- National team: Italy: 12 caps (1989-1992)
- Born: 1 October 1962 (age 63) Castrezzato, Italy

Sport
- Sport: Athletics
- Event: Racewalking
- Club: Began Sport: (1982-1983); Fiamma Vicenza (1984-1991); Fiat Sud Formia (1992-1997); Atletica Brescia 1950 (as masters)
- Retired: 1997

Achievements and titles
- Personal bests: 5 km walk (track): 22:44 (1992); 10 km walk: 46:32 (1991; 10 km walk (track): 49:19 (1990); 20 km walk: 1:42:53 (1992)
Medal record
World Race Walking Cup
Silver medal – second place	1991 San Josè	Team

Maria Grazia Cogoli (born 1 October 1962) is a former Italian racewalker, three-time national champion at senior level.

== National records ==
- 10,000 m walk (track): 54:52.4 ( (Italy) Como, 3 October 1982) - until 23 April 1983

== Achievements ==
Year	Competition	Venue	Rank	Event	Performance	Notes
1983	World Race Walking Cup	(Norway) Bergen	22nd	10 km walk	49.25	
1983	World Race Walking Cup	(Norway) Bergen	5	Team	88 pts	
1985	World Race Walking Cup	(Isle of Man) St John	16th	10 km walk	48.38	
1985	World Race Walking Cup	(Isle of Man) St John	6th	Team	48 pts	
1991	World Race Walking Cup	(United States) San Josè	38th	10 km walk	48.28	
1991	World Race Walking Cup	(United States) San Josè	2nd	Team	180 pts	

== National titles ==
Cogoli won three national championships at individual senior level.

- Italian Athletics Championships
  - 5000 m race walk (track): 1985, 1986
  - 10,000 m race walk (track): 1985

== See also ==
- Italian team at the running events
- Italy at the IAAF World Race Walking Cup
