= Luigi De Rosso =

Italian racewalker (1935–2020)

Personal information
- Nationality: Italian
- Born: 5 May 1935 Velo d'Astico
- Died: 28 April 2020 (aged 84)

Sport
- Country: Italy
- Sport: Athletics
- Event: Race walk
- Club: G-S. Fiamme Oro
Medal record
World Race Walking Cup
Bronze medal – third place	1961 Lugano	Combined Team

Luigi De Rosso (5 May 1935 – 28 April 2020) was an Italian male racewalker who competed at the 1960 Summer Olympics.

== See also ==
- Italian team at the running events
- Italy at the IAAF World Race Walking Cup
