= Gianni Corsaro =

Italian racewalker (1925–2006)

Personal information
- Full name: Giovanni Corsaro
- Nationality: Italian
- Born: 29 April 1925 Catania
- Died: 11 April 2006 (aged 80) Catania
- Height: 1.74 m (5 ft 9 in)
- Weight: 68 kg (150 lb)

Sport
- Country: Italy
- Sport: Athletics
- Event: Race walk

Gianni Corsaro (29 April 1925 – 11 April 2006) was an Italian racewalker who competed at the 1948 Summer Olympics and the 1960 Summer Olympics.

== See also ==
- Italian team at the running events
- Italy at the IAAF World Race Walking Cup
