= Mariavittoria Becchetti =

Italian racewalker (born 1994)

Personal information
- National team: Italy (7 caps)
- Born: 12 December 1994 (age 31) Rome, Italy
- Height: 1.60 m (5 ft 3 in)
- Weight: 43 kg (95 lb)

Sport
- Country: Italy
- Sport: Athletics
- Event: Racewalking
- Club: Cus Cagliari
- Coached by: Patrizio Parcesepe

Achievements and titles
- Personal bests: 20 km walk: 1:34:01 (2019); 50 km walk: 4:26:10 (2019)
Medal record
Event	1st	2nd	3rd
World Race Walking Cup	0	0	0
European Race Walking Cup	0	0	1
Total	0	0	1

Mariavittoria Becchetti (born 12 December 1994) is an Italian racewalker.

She won a bronze medal with the Italian team at the 2019 European Race Walking Cup.

== Achievements ==
Year	Competition	Venue	Position	Event	Performance	Notes
2019	European Cup	(Lithuania) Alytus	11th	50 km	4:26:10	PB
2019	European Cup	(Lithuania) Alytus	3rd	50 km team	27 pts	

== See also ==
- Italy at the European Race Walking Cup
