= Eleonora Giorgi (race walker) =

Italian racewalker (born 1989)

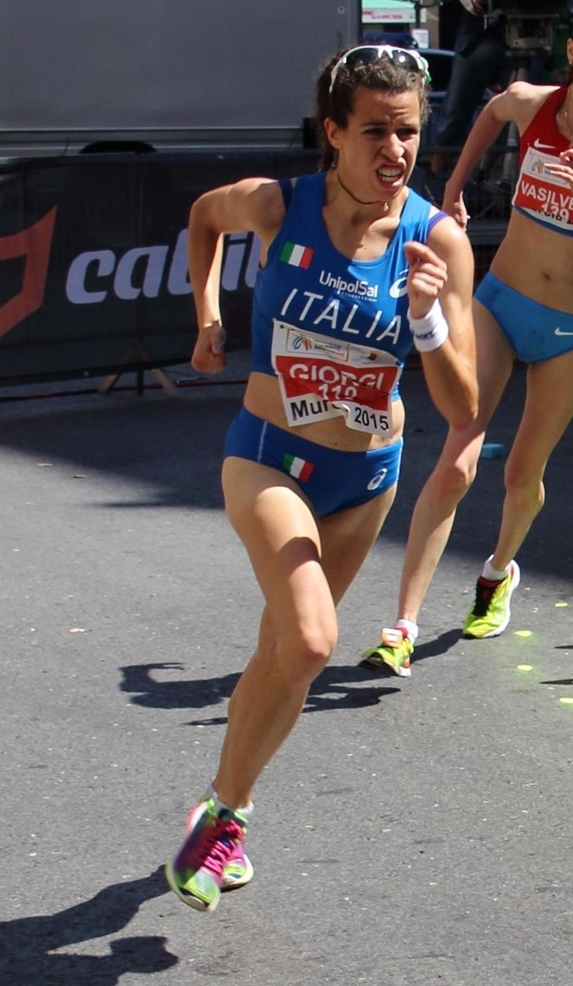
- Giorgi in 2015 in Murcia

Personal information
- Full name: Eleonora Anna Giorgi
- Nationality: Italian
- Born: 14 September 1989 (age 37) Milan, Italy
- Height: 1.63 m (5 ft 4 in)
- Weight: 52 kg (115 lb)

Sport
- Country: Italy
- Sport: Athletics
- Event: Racewalking
- Club: Fiamme Azzurre
- Coached by: Giovanni Perricelli

Achievements and titles
- Personal bests: 20 km walk: 1:29:48 (2012); 50 km walk: 4:04:50 (2019)
Medal record
Event	1st	2nd	3rd
World Championships	0	0	1
World Team Championships	0	2	0
European Race Walking Team C'ships	2	3	1
Mediterranean Games	1	0	0
Total	3	5	2
World Championships
Bronze medal – third place	2019 Doha	50 km walk
World Team Championships
Silver medal – second place	2018 Taicang	20 km walk (team)
Silver medal – second place	2026 Brasília	Marathon walk (team)
European Race Walking Team Championships
Gold medal – first place	2019 Alytus	50 km walk
Gold medal – first place	2021 Poděbrady	35 km walk (team)
Silver medal – second place	2015 Murcia	20 km walk
Silver medal – second place	2015 Murcia	20 km walk (team)
Silver medal – second place	2021 Poděbrady	35 km walk
Bronze medal – third place	2019 Alytus	50 km walk (team)
Mediterranean Games
Gold medal – first place	2013 Mersin	20 km walk

Eleonora Anna Giorgi (born 14 September 1989) is an Italian race walker who won a bronze medal at the 2019 World Athletics Championships. She competed at the 2020 Summer Olympics, in 20 km walk.

She is the 5000 metres race walk (outdoor, track) world record holder with the time of 20:01.80 sets on 18 May 2014 in Misterbianco.

== Biography ==
On 9 June 2012 in A Coruña, one leg of IAAF Race Walking Gran Prix 2012 she obtained the "standard A" for 2012 Summer Olympics, on 13 March at the 2012 IAAF World Race Walking Cup in Saransk (Russia) she ranked 14th, matching the other FIDAL requirement (classify among the first 20 athletes) for FIDAL). On 6 July 2012 she won the race in Bressanone walking 10 km in 45 min 19 sec and received the gold medal.

On 29 September 2019 she won the bronze medal at the first edition of the 50 km race walk at the 2019 World Athletics Championships in Doha, Qatar, race held at night from 11 pm to 3 am the following morning, to try to alleviate the strong heat. She is engaged to the Italian racewalker Matteo Giupponi.

== Statistics ==
=== World records ===
- 5000 metres race walk (track): 20:01.80 ( (Italy) Misterbianco, 18 May 2014) – current holder

=== European records ===
- 50 km walk (road): 4:04:50 ( (Lithuania) Alytus, 19 May 2019) – current holder.

== Achievements ==
Year	Competition	Venue	Position	Event	Time	Notes
Youth level
2008	World Race Walking Cup (U20)	(Russia) Cheboksary	27th	10 km	49:44	
2008	World Junior Championships	(Poland) Bydgoszcz	18th	10,000m	47:58.68	
2009	European U23 Championships	(Lithuania) Kaunas	11th	20 km walk	1:39:42	
Senior level
2011	European Race Walking Cup	(Portugal) Olhão	28th	20 km	1:38:29	
2011	European U23 Championships	(Czech Republic) Ostrava	4th	20 km walk	1:38:41	
2012	World Race Walking Cup	(China) Saransk	14th	20 km walk	1:32:57	PB
2012	World Race Walking Challenge	(Spain) A Coruña	6th	20 km walk	1:31:18	PB
2012	Olympic Games	(United Kingdom) London	14th	20 km walk	1:29:48	PB
2013	European Race Walking Cup	(Slovakia) Dudince	6th	20 km	1:32:09	
2013	Mediterranean Games	(Turkey) Mersin	1st	20 km walk	1:39.13	
2013	World Championships	(Russia) Moscow	10th	20 km walk	1:30:01	SB
2014	World Race Walking Cup	(China) Taicang	5th	20 km	1:27:05	
2015	European Race Walking Cup	(Spain) Murcia	2nd	20 km	1:26:17	
2015	European Race Walking Cup	(Spain) Murcia	2nd	20 km – Team	30 pts	
2015	World Championships	(China) Beijing	DSQ	20 km walk	-	
2018	Race Walking Team Championships	(China) Taicang	2nd	20 km – Team	38 pts	
2019	European Race Walking Cup	(Lithuania) Alytus	1st	50 km	4:04:50	AR
2019	European Race Walking Cup	(Lithuania) Alytus	3rd	50 km – Team	50 pts	
2019	World Championships	(Qatar) Doha	3rd	50 km	4:29:13	

== National titles ==
Giorgi won seven national championships at individual senior level.

- Italian Athletics Championships
  - 10 km (road): 2012, 2019 (2)
  - 20 km (road): 2021 (1)
  - 35 km (road): 2021 (1)
  - 10,000 m (track): 2017 (1)
- Italian Indoor Athletics Championships
  - 3000 m race walk: 2012, 2014 (2)

== See also ==
- Italy at the European Race Walking Cup – Multiple medalists
- Italian all-time lists – 20 km walk
- Italian all-time lists – 50 km walk
- List of world records in athletics
- List of European records in athletics
- List of Italian records in athletics
- Italian team at the running events
