= Giorgio Rubino =

Italian racewalker (born 1986)

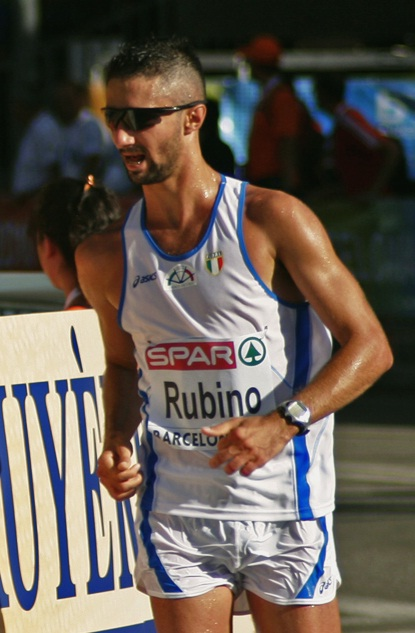
- Giorgio Rubino

Personal information
- Born: 15 April 1986 (age 40)
- Height: 1.7 m (5 ft 7 in)
- Weight: 77 kg (170 lb; 12 st 2 lb)

Sport
- Country: Italy
- Sport: Athletics
- Event: 20km Race Walk
- Club: Fiamme Gialle
Medal record
Event	1st	2nd	3rd
World Championships	0	0	1
World Race Walking Team C'ships	0	1	0
European Race Walking Team C'ships	2	2	0
Mediterranean Games	0	1	0
Total	2	4	1
World Championships
Bronze medal – third place	2009 Berlin	20 km walk
World Race Walking Team Championships
Silver medal – second place	2018 Taicang	20 km team
European Race Walking Cup
Gold medal – first place	2009 Metz	20 km individual
Gold medal – first place	2009 Metz	20 km team
Silver medal – second place	2007 Leamington	20 km team
Silver medal – second place	2011 Olhão	20 km team
Mediterranean Games
Silver medal – second place	2009 Pescara	20 km individual

Giorgio Rubino (born 15 April 1986 in Rome) is an Italian race walker, bronze medal in the 20 km walk at the 2009 World Championships in Berlin.

== Biography ==
The medals of some of the athletics world championship races in 2009 were otherwise awarded on 24 March 2016 as a result of doping disqualifications. Among these reallocations also the medals of 20 km walk, which saw the Italian Giorgio Rubino, initially 4th, get the bronze medal This fact, 7 years after the event, allowed Italy to clear the zero in the Medal table. He also has won other four medals, three of these at senior level, in international competitions, and is a five-time winner at the Italian Championships.

== Achievements ==
Year	Competition	Venue	Rank	Event	Time
2003	World Youth Championships	Sherbrooke, Canada	4th	10,000 m	43:00.37
2004	World Race Walking Cup (U20)	Naumburg, Germany	—	10 km	DQ
2004	World Junior Championships	Grosseto, Italy	10th	10,000 m	42:00.63
2005	European Race Walking Cup (U20)	Miskolc, Hungary	2nd	10 km	40:46
2005	European Junior Championships	Kaunas, Lithuania	3rd	10,000 m	40:46.95
2006	World Race Walking Cup	A Coruña, Spain	17th	20 km	1:22:05
2006	European Championships	Gothenburg, Sweden	8th	20 km	1:22:34
2007	European Race Walking Cup	Royal Leamington Spa, United Kingdom	10th	20 km	1:21:17
2007	European Race Walking Cup	Royal Leamington Spa, United Kingdom	2nd	Team - 20 km	32 pts
2007	European U23 Championships	Debrecen, Hungary	—	20 km	DQ
2007	World Championships	Osaka, Japan	5th	20 km	1:23:39
2008	Olympic Games	Beijing, China	18th	20 km	1:22:11
2009	European Race Walking Cup	Metz, France	1st	20 km	1:24:06
2009	European Race Walking Cup	Metz, France	1st	Team - 20 km	6 pts
2009	World Championships	Berlin, Germany	3rd	20 km	1:19:50
2009	Mediterranean Games	Pescara, Italy	2nd	20 km	1:22:34
2010	European Championships	Barcelona, Spain	4th	20 km	1:22:12
2011	European Race Walking Cup	Olhão, Portugal	4th	20 km	1:24:14
2011	European Race Walking Cup	Olhão, Portugal	2nd	Team - 20 km	27 pts
2011	World Championships	Daegu, South Korea	—	20 km	DQ
2012	World Race Walking Cup	Saransk, Russia	21st	20 km	1:22:42
2012	Olympic Games	London, United Kingdom	42nd	20 km	1:25:28
2013	European Race Walking Cup	Dudince, Slovakia	13th	20 km	1:23:58
2013	World Championships	Moscow, Russia	28th	20 km	1:25:42
2014	World Race Walking Cup	Taicang, China	20th	20 km	1:20:44
2014	European Championships	Zürich, Switzerland	8th	20 km	1:22:07
2015	European Race Walking Cup	Murcia, Spain	11th	20 km	1:22:55
2015	European Race Walking Cup	Murcia, Spain	7th	Team - 20 km	71 pts
2015	World Championships	Beijing, China	20th	20 km walk	1:23:23
2018	World Race Walking Team Championships	Taicang, China	2nd	Team - 20 km	29 pts

== National titles ==
- Italian Athletics Championships
  - 10,000 metres walk: 2012
  - 20 km walk: 2005
- Italian Indoor Athletics Championships
  - 5000 metres walk: 2006, 2012, 2013

== See also ==
- Italian team at the running events
- Italy at the IAAF World Race Walking Cup
- Italy at the European Race Walking Cup - Multiple medalists
- Italian all-time lists - 20 km walk
