= Antonio De Gaetano =

Italian racewalker

Personal information
- Nationality: Italian
- Born: 18 May 1934 Ancona
- Died: 21 August 2007 (aged 73)

Sport
- Country: Italy
- Sport: Athletics
- Event: Race walk
Medal record
World Race Walking Cup
Bronze medal – third place	1961 Lugano	Combined Team

Antonio De Gaetano (18 May 1934 – 21 August 2007) was an Italian male racewalker who competed at the 1960 Summer Olympics. He had a son, Giuseppe, who was also a racewalker.

== See also ==
- Italy at the IAAF World Race Walking Cup
