= Gisella Orsini =

Italian sportsperson

Personal information
- Nationality: Italian
- Born: 8 December 1971 (age 54) Geneve, Switzerland

Sport
- Country: Italy
- Sport: Athletics
- Event: Racewalking
- Club: G.S. Forestale

Achievements and titles
- Personal best: 20 km walk: 1:31:57 (2016)
Medal record
Event	1st	2nd	3rd
World Race Walking Cup	0	1	0
European Race Walking Cup	1	2	0
Total	1	3	0

Gisella Orsini (born 8 December 1971) is a Swiss writer and former racewalker. She won a silver medal with the Italian team at the World Race Walking Cup.

== Biography ==
At the end of her career as an athlete she started writing, winning prizes with her books, such as in 2016 for Veleno nelle gole (Poison in the throats) and with subsequent ones.

== Achievements ==
Year	Competition	Venue	Position	Event	Performance	Notes
2002	World Race Walking Cup	(Italy) Turin	20th	20 km	1:34:37	
2002	World Race Walking Cup	(Italy) Turin	2nd	20 km team	26 pts	

== National titles ==
- Italian Athletics Championships
  - 20 km walk: 2006, 2007

== See also ==
- Italian team at the running events
- Italy at the IAAF World Race Walking Cup
- Italy at the European Race Walking Cup
