= Fabio Mascheroni =

Italian long-distance runner

Personal information
- National team: Italy (4 caps from 2005 to 2008)
- Born: 17 February 1977 (age 49) Busto Arsizio, Italy

Sport
- Country: Italy
- Sport: Athletics
- Event: Long-distance running

Achievements and titles
- Personal bests: Half marathon: 1:04:14 (2007); Marathon: 2:22:26 (2000)
Medal record
European 10,000m Cup
Silver medal – second place	2007 Ferrara	Team
Bronze medal – third place	2008 Istanbul	Team

Fabio Mascheroni (born 17 February 1977) is a former Italian male long-distance runner who competed at individual senior level at the IAAF World Half Marathon Championships.

== Biography ==
Mascheroni also won a national title at senior level. He also won two medals with the national team at the European 10,000m Cup.

== National titles ==
- Italian Athletics Championships
  - Half marathon: 2005

== See also ==
- Italian team at the running events
