= Lorenzo Civallero =

Italian race walker (born 1975)

Personal information
- Nationality: Italian
- Born: August 8, 1975 (age 50)

Sport
- Country: Italy
- Sport: Athletics
- Event: Racewalking
- Club: C.S. Carabinieri
Medal record
Event	1st	2nd	3rd
World Race Walking Cup	0	0	3
Summer Universiade	1	1	0
Total	1	1	3

Lorenzo Civallero (born 8 August 1975) is a former Italian race walker who won two medals, one of these gold, at the Summer Universiade.

== Achievements ==
Year	Competition	Venue	Position	Event	Notes
Representing Italy
1994	World Junior Championships	Lisbon, Portugal	15th	10,000m	42:58.34
1997	European U23 Championships	Turku, Finland	7th	20 km	1:23:45
1999	Universiade	Palma de Mallorca, Spain	2nd	20 km	1:25:23
2001	European Race Walking Cup	Dudince, Slovakia	12th	20 km	1:22:10
2001	World Championships	Edmonton, Canada	16th	20 km	1:25:28
2001	Universiade	Beijing, China	1st	20 km	1:24:42
2002	European Championships	Munich, Germany	9th	20 km	1:21:21
2002	World Race Walking Cup	Turin, Italy	12th	20 km	1:24:22
2003	World Championships	Paris, France	11th	20 km	1:20:34 PB
2005	World Championships	Helsinki, Finland	14th	20 km	1:22:52

== See also ==
- Italian all-time lists - 20 km walk
- Italian team at the running events
- Italy at the IAAF World Race Walking Cup
- Italy at the European Race Walking Cup
