= Orazio Romanzi =

Italian racewalker

Personal information
- Nationality: Italian
- Born: 16 September 1970 (age 55)

Sport
- Country: Italy
- Sport: Athletics
- Event: Racewalking
- Club: Fiamme Gialle

Achievements and titles
- Personal bests: 10,000 m walk: 41:25.5 (1997); 20 Km walk: 1:22:26 (1995); 50 Km walk: 3:54:55 (1997)

Orazio Romanzi (born 16 September 1970) is an Italian male retired racewalker, which participated at the 1997 World Championships in Athletics.

== Achievements ==
Year	Competition	Venue	Position	Event	Time	Notes
1996	European Race Walking Cup	(Spain) A Coruña	5th	50 km walk	4:01:30	
1997	World Race Walking Cup	(Czech Republic) Poděbrady	23rd	50 km walk	3:54:55	PB
1997	World Championships	(Greece) Athens	28th	50 km walk	4:11:00	
