= Diego Cafagna =

Italian race walker (born 1975)

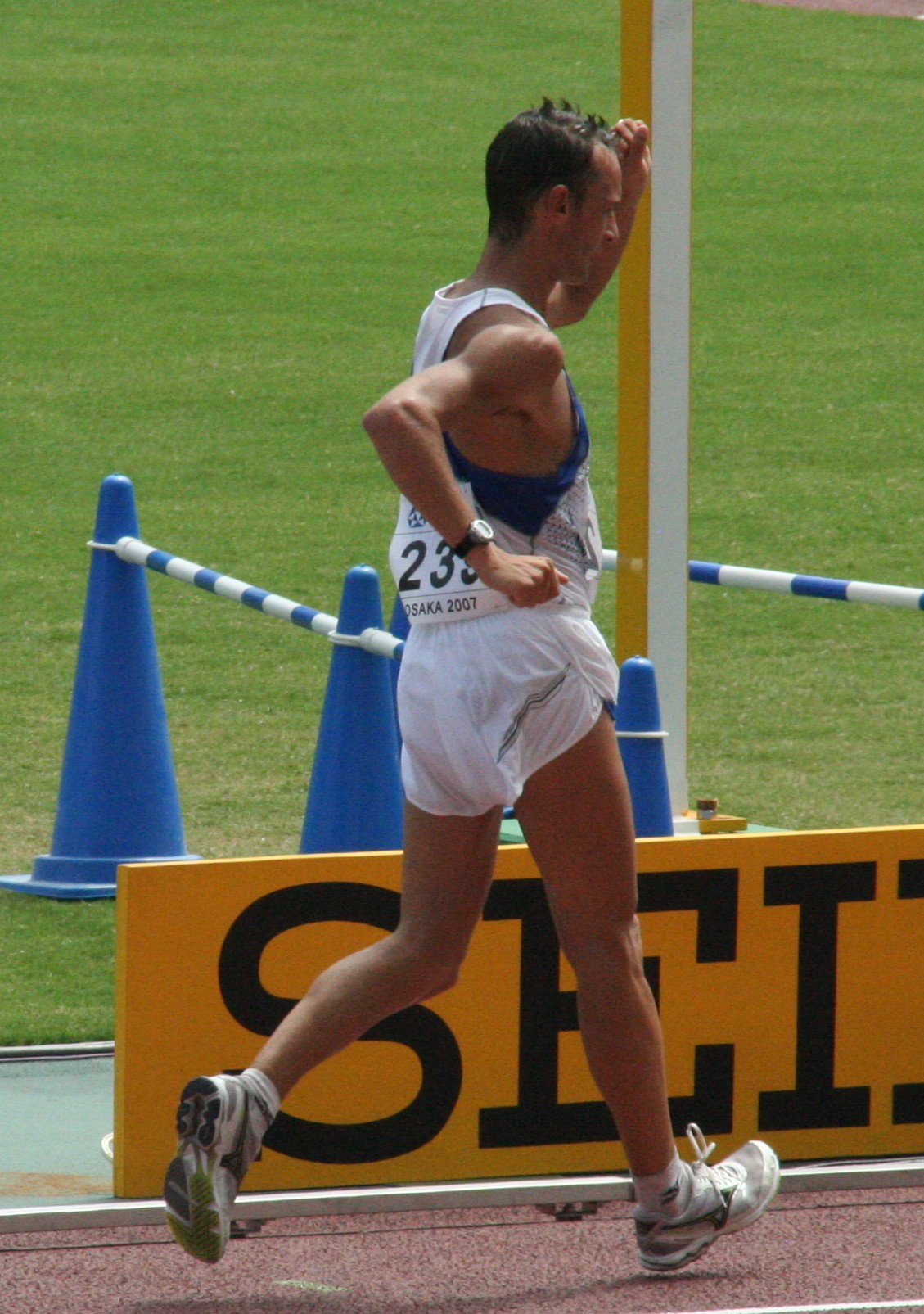
- Cafagna at the 2007 World Championships in Athletics

Personal information
- Nationality: Italian
- Born: 9 July 1975 (age 51) Trieste, Italy
- Height: 1.74 m (5 ft 8 1/2 in)
- Weight: 60 kg (132 lb)

Sport
- Country: Italy
- Sport: Athletics
- Event: Racewalking
- Club: C.S. Carabinieri

Achievements and titles
- Personal bests: 20 km walk: 1:23.55 (2005); 50 km walk: 3:53.46 (2008)

Diego Cafagna (born 9 July 1975) is an Italian former race walker.

== Biography ==
Diego Cafagna participated at one edition of the Summer Olympics (2008), he has 12 caps in national team from 1997 to 2008.

== Achievements ==
Year	Competition	Venue	Position	Event	Notes
Representing Italy
2002	World Race Walking Cup	Turin, Italy	25th	50 km	4:02:30
2004	World Race Walking Cup	Naumburg, Germany	22nd	50 km	4:04:54
2005	World Championships	Helsinki, Finland	—	50 km	DQ
2006	European Championships	Gothenburg, Sweden	11th	50 km	3:55:22
2006	World Race Walking Cup	A Coruña, Spain	15th	50 km	3:55:41
2007	World Championships	Osaka, Japan	18th	50 km	4:06:03
2008	World Race Walking Cup	Cheboksary, Russia	18th	50 km	3:53:46
2008	Olympic Games	Beijing, China	—	50 km	DQ
2009	European Race Walking Cup	Metz, France	11th	50 km	4:01:47
2009	European Race Walking Cup	Metz, France	3rd	Team - 50 km	38 pts
2009	World Championships	Berlin, Germany	28th	50 km	4:08:04
2010	World Race Walking Cup	Chihuahua, Mexico	26th	50 km	4:10:18

== See also ==
- Italian team at the running events
- Italy at the IAAF World Race Walking Cup
