= Cristiana Pellino =

Italian racewalker (1970–2018)

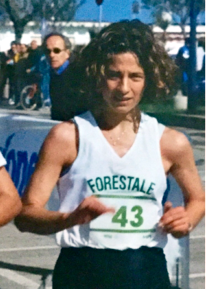

Personal information
- National team: Italy: 9 caps (1993-2005)
- Born: 21 September 1970 Rome, Italy
- Died: February 23, 2018 (aged 47) Rome, Italy

Sport
- Sport: Athletics
- Event: Racewalking
- Club: G.S. Forestale
- Retired: 2006

Achievements and titles
- Personal bests: 10 km: 42:55 (1994); 20 km: 1:30:42 (2000)
Medal record
Event	1st	2nd	3rd
World Race Walking Cup	1	2	0
European Race Walking Cup	1	0	0
Total	2	2	0
Military World Games
Silver medal – second place	2003 Catania	5000 m walk

Cristiana "Chicca" Pellino (21 September 1970 - 23 February 2018) was an Italian racewalker.

== Biography ==
After her career as an athlete she became a coach, coaching Marco De Luca among others. She dead in 2018 at 47.

== National titles ==
Pellino won three titles in a row at the national championships at individual senior level.

- Italian Athletics Indoor Championships
  - 3000 m walk: 1999, 2000, 2001

== See also ==
- Italian team at the running events
- Italy at the European Race Walking Cup
- Italy at the Military World Games
