= Ivano Brugnetti =

Italian race walker (born 1976)

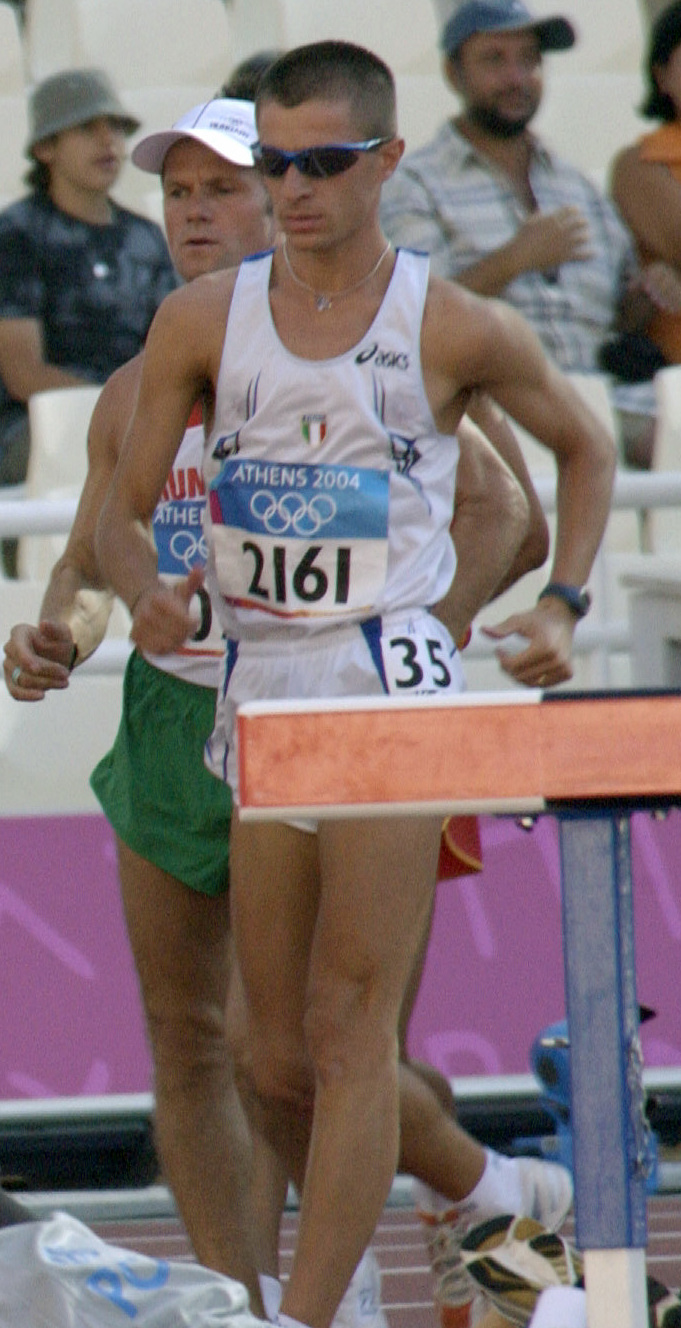
- Brugnetti in 2004

Personal information
- Nationality: Italian
- Born: 1 September 1976 (age 49) Milan, Italy
- Height: 1.76 m (5 ft 9 1/2 in)
- Weight: 61 kg (134 lb)

Sport
- Country: Italy
- Sport: Athletics
- Event: Race walking
- Club: G.S. Fiamme Gialle

Achievements and titles
- Personal bests: 20 km: 1:19.36 (2007); 50 km: 3:47.54 (1999)
Medal record
Event	1st	2nd	3rd
Olympic Games	1	0	0
World Championships	1	0	0
Mediterranean Games	1	0	0
European Race Walking Cup	0	2	0

Ivano Brugnetti (born 1 September 1976) is an Italian former race walker.

== Biography ==
Brugnetti won five medals, at individual level, in international athletics competitions. He participated at three editions of the Summer Olympics (2000, 2004, and 2008) and earned 22 caps in the national team from 1997 to 2008.

== Achievements ==
Year	Competition	Venue	Position	Event	Notes
Representing Italy
1999	World Race Walking Cup	Mézidon-Canon, France	26th	50 km	3:51:45
1999	World Championships	Seville, Spain	1st	50 km	3:47:54
2000	European Race Walking Cup	Eisenhüttenstadt, Germany	—	50 km	DNF
2000	Olympic Games	Sydney, Australia	—	50 km	DNF
2001	Mediterranean Games	Tunis, Tunisia	7th	20 km	1:33:03
2002	World Race Walking Cup	Turin, Italy	—	50 km	DNF
2003	European Race Walking Cup	Cheboksary, Russia	—	50 km	DNF
2004	World Race Walking Cup	Naumburg, Germany	6th	20 km	1:20:06
2004	Olympic Games	Athens, Greece	1st	20 km	1:19:40
2005	European Race Walking Cup	Miskolc, Hungary	—	20 km	DQ
2005	World Championships	Helsinki, Finland	—	20 km	DNF
2006	World Race Walking Cup	A Coruña, Spain	15th	20 km	1:21:47
2006	European Championships	Gothenburg, Sweden	17th	20 km	1:27:42
2007	European Race Walking Cup	Leamington Spa, United Kingdom	2nd	20 km	1:19:36
2007	European Race Walking Cup	Leamington Spa, United Kingdom	2nd	Team - 20 km	32 pts
2007	World Championships	Osaka, Japan	—	20 km	DSQ
2008	World Race Walking Cup	Cheboksary, Russia	16th	20 km	1:21:19
2008	Olympic Games	Beijing, China	5th	20 km	1:19:51
2009	European Race Walking Cup	Metz, France	2nd	20 km	1:24:54
2009	European Race Walking Cup	Metz, France	1st	Team - 20 km	6 pts
2009	Mediterranean Games	Pescara, Italy	1st	20 km	1:22:33
2009	World Championships	Berlin, Germany	—	20 km	DNF
2010	World Race Walking Cup	Chihuahua, Mexico	11th	20 km	1:24:29
2010	European Championships	Barcelona, Spain	—	20 km	DNF

== National titles ==
Brugnetti is a seven-time winner at the Italian Athletics Championships.

- 4 wins in the 10,000 m walk (1999, 2006, 2008, 2009)
- 2 wins in the 20 km walk (2003, 2004)
- 1 win in the 5000 metres walk indoor (2001)

== See also ==
- FIDAL Hall of Fame
- Italy at the European Race Walking Cup - Multiple medalists
- Italian all-time lists - 20 km walk
- Italian all-time lists - 50 km walk
