= Gabriele De Nard =

Italian long-distance runner

Personal information
- Nationality: Italian
- Born: 3 November 1974 (age 51) Belluno

Sport
- Country: Italy
- Sport: Athletics
- Event: Long-distance running
- Club: G.S. Fiamme Gialle

Achievements and titles
- Personal best: Half marathon: 1:03.45 (2006)
Medal record
European Cross Country Championships
Gold medal – first place	1998 Ferrara	Team
Silver medal – second place	2004 Heringsdorf	Team
Bronze medal – third place	2009 Dublin	Team
Bronze medal – third place	2012 Budapest	Team

Gabriele De Nard (born 3 November 1974) is an Italian male long-distance runner who won three national championships.

== Biography ==
He competed at eight editions of the IAAF World Cross Country Championships, and seventeen editions of the European Cross Country Championships winning four medals with the national team (his best results at individual level was a fourth place).

He is married with the Italian long-distance runner Federica Dal Ri.
