= Sara Dossena =

Italian long-distance runner

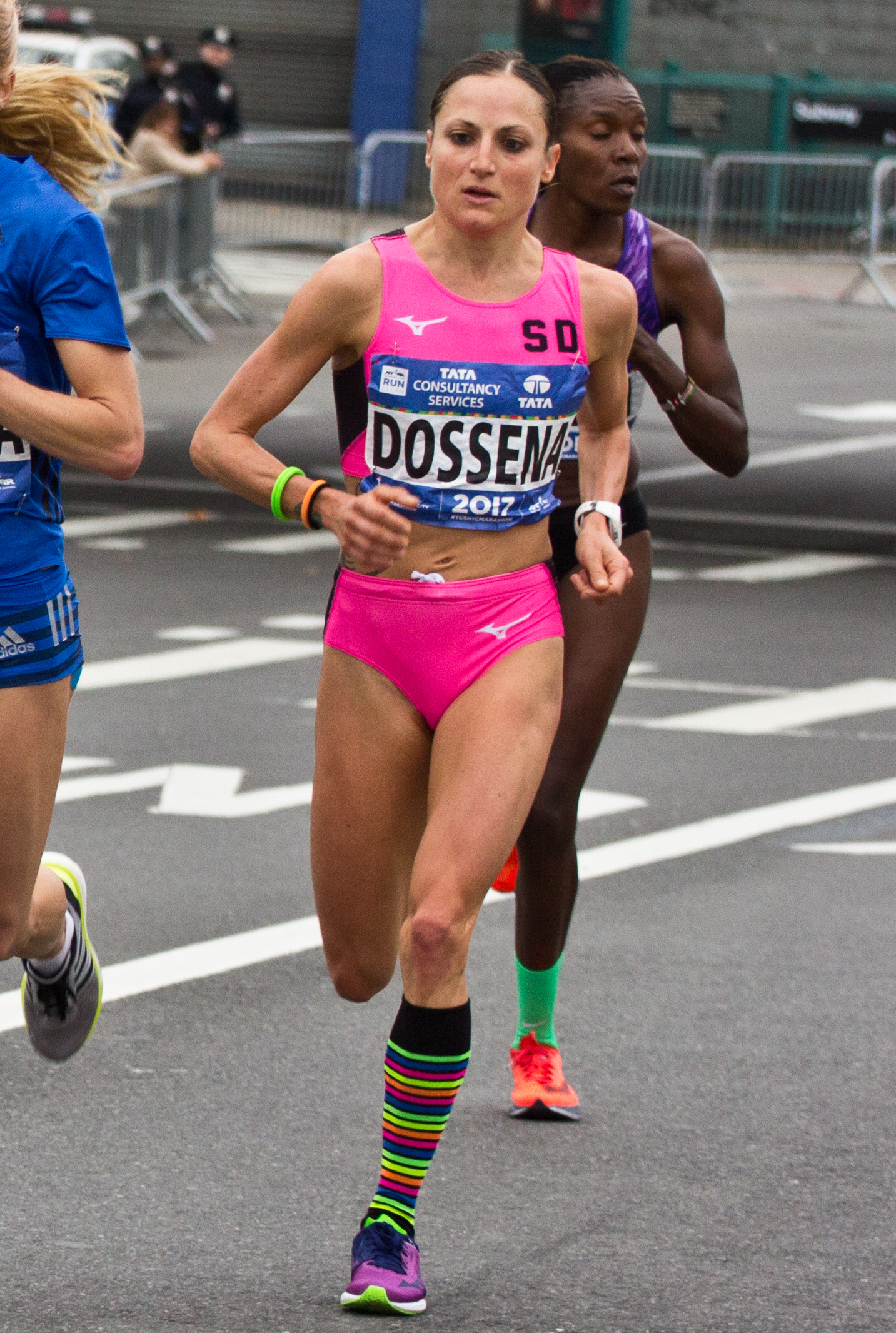
- Sara Dossena at the 2017 New York City Marathon

Personal information
- National team: Italy (6 caps)
- Born: 21 November 1984 (age 41) Clusone
- Height: 1.60 m (5 ft 3 in)
- Weight: 48 kg (106 lb)

Sport
- Country: Italy
- Sport: Athletics
- Event: Long-distance running
- Club: Laguna Running
- Coached by: Maurizio Brassini

Achievements and titles
- Personal bests: Half marathon: 1:10.10 (2018); Marathon: 2:24.00 (2019); 10K road: 32:17 (2019)
Medal record
Mediterranean Games
Gold medal – first place	2018 Tarragona	Half marathon
European 10,000m Cup
Bronze medal – third place	2019 London	10,000 m team

Sara Dossena (born 21 November 1984) is an Italian long-distance runner, who won a gold medal at the 2018 Mediterranean Games. She also won three national championships (10.000 m track, 10 km road and cross country). In 2019, she competed in the women's marathon at the 2019 World Athletics Championships held in Doha, Qatar. She did not finish her race.

== Career ==
=== Cross country running ===
In 2015, Dossena won the Italian Cross Country Championships.

=== Road racing ===
In her first marathon, Dossena finished 6th at the 2017 New York City Marathon.

=== Track racing ===
In 2017, she was Italian 10,000 metres champion.

=== Multi-sport ===
Dossena has been the Italian triathlon champion and duathlon champion.

== Achievements ==
Year	Competition	Venue	Position	Event	Time	Notes
2018	Mediterranean Games	(Spain) Tarragona	1st	Half marathon	1:13.48	
2018	European Championships	(Germany) Berlin	6th	Marathon	2:27:53	PB
2018	European Championships	(Germany) Berlin	2nd	Marathon Team	7:32:46	

== National titles ==
- Italian Athletics Championships
  - 10,000 metres: 2017
  - 10 km road 2018
- Italian Cross Country Championships
  - Senior race: 2015

== Marathon ==
At March 2019 she disputed three marathon.

Marathon	Time	Rank	Venue	Date
New York City Marathon	2:29:39	6th	(United States) New York City	5 September 2017
Berlin Marathon	2:27:53	6th	(Germany) Berlin	12 August 2018
Nagoya Women's Marathon	2:24:00	7th	(Japan) Nagoya	10 March 2019

== See also ==
- Italian all-time lists - Marathon
