= Federica Dal Ri =

Italian long-distance runner

Personal information
- Nationality: Italian
- Born: 25 September 1980 (age 45) Cles

Sport
- Country: Italy
- Sport: Athletics
- Event: Long-distance running
- Club: G.S. Esercito

Achievements and titles
- Personal bests: 3000 m indoor: 9:03.76 (2008); 5000 m: 15:39.21 (2010); 10,000 m: 32:55.12 (2010)
Medal record
World Military Championships
Gold medal – first place	2009 Sofia	5000 m
European 10,000m Cup
Gold medal – first place	2011 Oslo	Team
Silver medal – second place	2012 Bilbao	Team
Bronze medal – third place	2015 Cagliari	Team

Federica Dal Ri (born 25 September 1980) is an Italian female long-distance runner who won a gold medal at the World Military Track and Field Championships.

== Biography ==
She competed at three editions of the IAAF World Cross Country Championships, and five editions of the European Cross Country Championships.

She is married with the Italian long-distance runner Gabriele De Nard.

== Achievements ==
Year	Competition	Venue	Position	Event	Time	Notes
2009	European Team Championships SL	(Portugal) Leiria	6th	3000 m	9:20.11	
2010	European Championships	(Spain) Barcelona	Final	10,000 m	DNF	

== National titles ==
She won seven national championships at senior level,

- Italian Athletics Championships
  - 5000 metres: 2009, 2010
  - 10,000 metres: 2012
  - Marathon: 2017
  - Cross country: 2017
  - Cross country (short race): 2005
- Italian Athletics Indoor Championships
  - 3000 metres: 2010
