= Gianmarco Buttazzo =

Italian long-distance runner

Personal information
- Nationality: Italian
- Born: 23 August 1977 (age 48) San Cesario di Lecce
- Height: 1.72 m (5 ft 8 in)
- Weight: 59 kg (130 lb)

Sport
- Country: Italy
- Sport: Athletics
- Event: Long-distance running
- Club: G.S. Esercito

Achievements and titles
- Personal best: Half marathon: 1:03.25 (2013)
Medal record
European Cross Country Championships
Bronze medal – third place	2009 Dublin	Team

Giammarco Buttazzo (born 23 August 1977) is an Italian male long-distance runner who won one national championship.

== Biography ==
He competed at two editions of the IAAF World Cross Country Championships (2006, 2008), two of the IAAF World Half Marathon Championships and four editions of the European Cross Country Championships (2006, 2014), winning a medal with the national team in 2009.
