= Enrico Lang =

Italian racewalker

Personal information
- Nationality: Italian
- Born: 31 March 1972 (age 54)

Sport
- Country: Italy
- Sport: Athletics
- Event: Racewalking

Achievements and titles
- Personal bests: 10,000 m walk: 40:15.18 (2000); 10 Km walk: 40:04 (2002); 20 Km walk: 1:22:51 (1995); 30 Km walk: 2:15:06 (2003); 50 Km walk: 4:01:23 (2004); 5000 m walk: 19:39.16 (2003)
Medal record
World Race Walking Cup
| Silver medal – second place | 1995 Beijing | Combined Team |
| Silver medal – second place | 1995 Beijing | 20 km Team |
| Bronze medal – third place | 2002 Turin | 20 km Team |

Enrico Lang (born 31 March 1972) is an Italian male osteopath, nutritionist and retired racewalker, which participated at the 1995 World Championships in Athletics.

== Achievements ==
| Year | Competition | Venue | Position | Event | Performance | Notes |
|---|---|---|---|---|---|---|
| 1995 | World Championships | (Finland) Helsinki | 15th | 20 km walk | 1:24:43 | |
