= Renate Rungger =

Italian long-distance runner

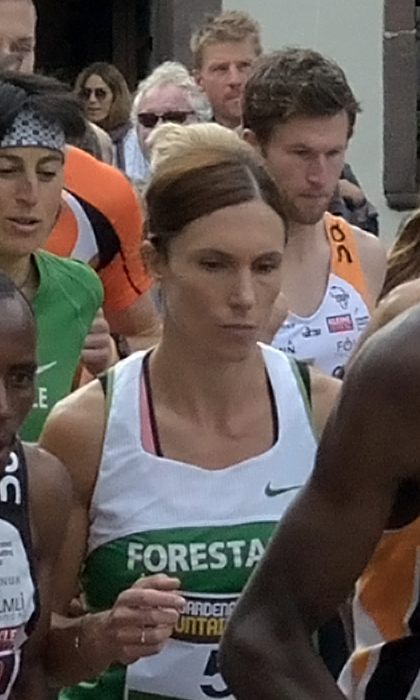
- Renate Rungger in 2014

Personal information
- National team: Italy (9 caps in 2005-2008)
- Born: 6 September 1979 (age 46) Sarnthein, Italy

Sport
- Country: Italy
- Sport: Athletics; Mountain running; Skyrunning
- Event: Long-distance running

Achievements and titles
- Personal best: Half marathon: 1:13:10 (2007)
Medal record
Mountain running
Event	1st	2nd	3rd
World Championships Team	1	1	1
European Championships Team	2	0	0
Total	3	1	1
World Mountain Running Championships
Silver medal – second place	2008 Serre	Individual

Renate Rungger (born 6 September 1979) is a former Italian female long-distance runner, mountain runner and sky runner who competed at individual senior level at the IAAF World Half Marathon Championships.

== Biography ==
She won several medals at the World and European championships in the mountain running, one of these at individual level.

== Achievements ==
Year	Competition	Venue	Position	Event	Time	Notes
Mountain running
2008	World Championships	(Switzerland) Sierre	2nd	Individual	44.57	
2008	World Championships	(Switzerland) Sierre	3rd	Team	33 pts	
2009	European Championships	(Austria) Telfes	4th	Individual	57.17	
2009	European Championships	(Austria) Telfes	1st	Team	16 pts	
2013	European Championships	(Bulgaria) Borovets	5th	Individual	54.05	
2013	European Championships	(Bulgaria) Borovets	1st	Team	11 pts	

== National titles ==
She won three national championships at individual senior level.

- Italian Athletics Championships
  - 10,000 m: 2005
- Italian Cross Country Championships
  - Long race: 2007
- Italian Vertical Kilometer Championships
  - Vertical Kilometer: 2012
