= 2004 European 10,000m Challenge =

== Results ==
=== Men's individual ===
Rank	Athlete	Country	Time
1st place, gold medalist(s)	José Manuel Martínez	Spain	28:11.11
2nd place, silver medalist(s)	Carles Castillejo	Spain	28:11.27
3rd place, bronze medalist(s)	Kamiel Maase	Netherlands	28:20.30
4	Ioannis Kanellopoulos	Greece	28:27.02
5	Ignacio Cáceres	Spain	28:39.14
6	Giuliano Battocletti	Italy	28:52.21
7	Michalis Yelasakis	Greece	29:05.37
8	Umberto Pusterla	Italy	29:06.94
9	Erik Sjöqvist	Sweden	29:11.12
10	Ayele Seteng	Israel	29:15.61
11	Dennis Jensen	Denmark	29:17.31
12	Mohamed Serbouti	France	29:18.03
13	Panagiotis Papoulias	Greece	29:22.49
14	Christian Nemeth	Belgium	29:30.34
15	Augusto Gomes	France	29:37.87
16	Domenico D'Ambrosio	Italy	29:40.91
17	Claus Bugge Hansen	Denmark	29:44.83
18	Joakim Johansson	Sweden	29:50.79
19	Ricardo Serrano	Spain	29:59.93
20	Glynn Tromans	United Kingdom	30:03.57
21	José Maduro	Portugal	30:06.43
—	Ricardo Ribas	Portugal	DNF
—	Slavko Petrović	Croatia	DNF
—	Dmitry Maksimov	Russia	DNF
—	Elijah Nyabuti	Kenya	DNF
—	Frédéric Collignon	Belgium	DNF
—	David Ramard	France	DNF
—	Khalid Zoubaa	France	DNF
—	Mirko Petrović	Serbia and Montenegro	DNF

=== Women's individual ===
Rank	Athlete	Country	Time
1st place, gold medalist(s)	Margaret Maury	France	32:01.01
2nd place, silver medalist(s)	Mihaela Botezan	Romania	32:15.43
3rd place, bronze medalist(s)	Fernanda Ribeiro	Portugal	32:23.10
4	Helena Javornik	Slovenia	32:31.36
5	Patrizia Tisi	Italy	32:34.04
6	Maria Protopappa	Greece	32:46.17
7	Christelle Daunay	France	32:48.69
8	Amaia Piedra	Spain	32:56.52
9	Ana Dias	Portugal	33:12.25
10	Teresa Recio	Spain	33:14.14
11	Anna Incerti	Italy	33:21.02
12	Vincenza Sicari	Italy	33:33.10
13	Natalia Cercheș	Moldova	33:33.79
14	Helena Sampaio	Portugal	33:38.70
15	Fatima Yvelain	France	33:39.12
16	Mounia Aboulahcen	Belgium	33:42.98
17	Sandra Baumann	Austria	34:14.56
18	Mónica Rosa	Portugal	34:36.40
19	Judith Plá	Spain	34:50.98
—	Anja Smolders	Belgium	DNF
—	Irene Kwambai	Kenya	DNF
—	Rodica Nagel	France	DNF
—	Mirja Jenni	Switzerland	DNF
—	Marina Bastos	Portugal	DNF
—	Snezana Kostic	Serbia and Montenegro	DNF
—	Silvia Sommaggio	Italy	DNF
—	Alessandra Aguilar	Spain	DNF
—	Hrisostomia Iakovou	Greece	DNF

=== Men's team ===
Rank	Nation	Total time
1st place, gold medalist(s)	Spain; José Manuel Martínez (28:11.11); Carles Castillejo (28:11.27); Ignacio Cáceres (28:39.14); Ricardo Serrano (29:59.93)	1:25:01.52
2nd place, silver medalist(s)	Greece; Ioannis Kanellopoulos (28:27.02); Michalis Yelasakis (29:05.37); Panagiotis Papoulias (29:22.49)	1:26:54.88
3rd place, bronze medalist(s)	Italy; Giuliano Battocletti (28:52.21); Umberto Pusterla (29:06.94); Domenico D'Ambrosio (29:40.91)	1:27:40.06

Athletes in italics did not score for their team but received medals

=== Women's team ===
Rank	Nation	Total time
1st place, gold medalist(s)	France; Margaret Maury (32:01.01); Christelle Daunay (32:48.69); Fatima Yvelain (33:39.12)	1:38:28.82
2nd place, silver medalist(s)	Portugal; Fernanda Ribeiro (32:23.10); Ana Dias (33:12.25); Helena Sampaio (33:38.70); Mónica Rosa (34:36.40); Marina Bastos DNF	1:39:14.05
3rd place, bronze medalist(s)	Italy; Patrizia Tisi (32:34.04); Anna Incerti (33:21.02); Vincenza Sicari (33:33.10); Silvia Sommaggio DNF	1:39:28.16
4	Spain; Amaia Piedra (32:56.52); Teresa Recio (33:14.14); Judith Plá (34:50.98); Alessandra Aguilar DNF	1:41:01.64

Athletes in italics did not score for their team but received medals
