= 2005 European 10,000m Cup =

International athletics competition

9th European 10,000m Cup
- Venue: Barakaldo, Spain
- Location: San Vicente Stadium
- Date: 2 April 2005
- Competitors: 37

Champions
- Men: Spain (1:23:53.88)
- Women: Portugal (1:38:36.35)

The 2005 European 10,000m Cup was the 9th edition of the annual 10,000 metres competition between European athletes, which was held at San Vicente Stadium in Barakaldo, Spain on 2 April. A total of 37 athletes (22 men and 15 women) from 12 European nations entered the competition, plus three African pacemakers running as guests.

Spain won the men's team event with a combined time of 1:23:53.88 hours, led by individual winner Juan Carlos de la Ossa. Portugal won the women's team race with a total time of 1:38:36.35, led by individual runner-up Fernanda Ribeiro. Sabrina Mockenhaupt (the sole German female entrant) won the women's individual race. Only three nations fielded enough athletes to qualify for the team section, and Germany only did so in the men's race.

== Results ==
=== Men's individual ===
Rank	Athlete	Country	Time
1st place, gold medalist(s)	Juan Carlos de la Ossa	Spain	27:27.80
2nd place, silver medalist(s)	Carles Castillejo	Spain	28:06.88
3rd place, bronze medalist(s)	Ricardo Serrano	Spain	28:19.20
4	Dmitry Maksimov	Russia	28:23.73
5	Slavko Petrović	Croatia	28:24.32
6	Pierre Joncheray	France	28:29.08
7	Sergey Yemelyanov	Russia	28:53.85
8	Ricardo Ribas	Portugal	28:54.10
9	Jose Ramos	Portugal	28:54.44
10	Ignacio Cáceres	Spain	29:04.54
11	Julien Moreau	France	29:05.13
12	André Pollmächer	Germany	29:10.54
13	Manuel Magalhães	Portugal	29:16.32
14	Stefan Koch	Germany	29:19.01
15	Marius Ionescu	Romania	29:36.00
16	Gary Murray	United Kingdom	29:36.03
17	Christian Olsen	Denmark	29:54.79
18	Oliver Dietz	Germany	30:03.27
19	Michalis Yelasakis	Greece	30:06.64
—	Alejandro Gomez	Spain	DNF
—	Fernando Silva	Portugal	DNF
—	Bouazza El Mastati	Spain	DNF
—	Cuthbert Nyasango	Zimbabwe	DNF

=== Women's individual ===
Rank	Athlete	Country	Time
1st place, gold medalist(s)	Sabrina Mockenhaupt	Germany	31:21.28
2nd place, silver medalist(s)	Fernanda Ribeiro	Portugal	32:03.22
3rd place, bronze medalist(s)	Viktoriya Klimina	Russia	32:04.57
4	Margaret Maury	France	32:23.87
5	Jolene Williams	Ireland	32:43.77
6	Mónica Rosa	Portugal	33:05.36
7	María Dolores Pulido	Spain	33:08.75
8	Alessandra Aguilar	Spain	33:12.01
9	Inês Monteiro	Portugal	33:27.67
10	Annemette Jensen	Denmark	33:35.17
11	Teresa Recio	Spain	33:59.69
12	Anna Rahm	Sweden	34:12.95
13	Judith Plá	Spain	34:34.46
—	Silvia Montane	Spain	DNF
—	Christin Johansson	Sweden	DNF
—	Alemayehu Mersha	Ethiopia	DNF
—	Ruhama Shauri	Tanzania	DNF

=== Men's team ===
Rank	Nation	Total time
1st place, gold medalist(s)	Spain; Juan Carlos de la Ossa (27:27.80); Carles Castillejo (28:06.88); Ricardo Serrano (28:19.20); Ignacio Cáceres (29:04.54); Alejandro Gomez DNF	1:23:53.88
2nd place, silver medalist(s)	Portugal; Ricardo Ribas (28:54.10); José Ramos (runner) (28:54.44); Manuel Magalhães (29:16.32); Fernando Silva DNF	1:04:27.86
3rd place, bronze medalist(s)	Germany; André Pollmächer (29:10.54); Stefan Koch (29:19.01); Oliver Dietz (30:03.27)	1:28:32.82

Athletes in italics did not score for their team but received medals

=== Women's team ===
Rank	Nation	Total time
1st place, gold medalist(s)	Portugal; Fernanda Ribeiro (32:03.22); Mónica Rosa (33:05.36); Inês Monteiro (33:27.67)	1:38:36.35
2nd place, silver medalist(s)	Spain; María Dolores Pulido (33:08.75); Alessandra Aguilar (33:12.01); Teresa Recio (33:59.69); Judith Plá (34:34.46)	1:40:20.45

Athletes in italics did not score for their team but received medals
