= 2012 European 10,000m Cup =

- Organisers: EAA
- Edition: 16th
- Date: 3 June 2012
- Host city: (Spain) Bilbao
- Events: 2

The 2012 European 10,000m Cup, was the 16th edition of the European 10,000m Cup took place on 3 June 2012 in Bilbao, Spain.

== Individual ==
=== Men ===
Rank	Athlete	Country	Time	Notes
1st place, gold medalist(s)	Polet Kemboi Arikan	Turkey	27.56,28	(PB)
2nd place, silver medalist(s)	Ayad Lamdassem	Spain	28.04,22	(SB)
3rd place, bronze medalist(s)	Carles Castillejo	Spain	28.07,50	
4	Manuel Ángel Penas	Spain	28.33,99	
5	Stefano La Rosa	Italy	28.34,54	
6	Rui Pedro Silva	Portugal	28.36,32	(SB)
7	Denis Mayaud	France	28.38,59	(SB)
8	Mustafa Mohamed	Sweden	28.40,71	(PB)
9	Youssef El Kalai	Portugal	28.46,64	(SB)
10	José Rocha	Portugal	28.50,38	

=== Women ===
Rank	Athlete	Country	Time	Notes
1st place, gold medalist(s)	Sara Moreira	Portugal	31.23,51	(PB)
2nd place, silver medalist(s)	Jo Pavey	United Kingdom	31.32,22	(SB)
3rd place, bronze medalist(s)	Christelle Daunay	France	31.35,81	(NR)
4	Sabrina Mockenhaupt	Germany	31.36,76	(SB)
5	Nadia Ejjafini	Italy	31.45,14	(PB)
6	Valeria Straneo	Italy	32.15,87	(PB)
7	Charlotte Purdue	United Kingdom	32.18,44	
8	Ana Dias	Portugal	32.20,89	
9	Gemma Steel	United Kingdom	32.34,81	(PB)
10	Elena Romagnolo	Italy	32.39,12	(PB)

== Team ==
In italic the participants whose result did not go into the team's total time, but awarded with medals.

Men
Rank	Nation	Time
1st place, gold medalist(s)	Spain	1:24.45,71
2nd place, silver medalist(s)	Portugal	1:26.13,34
3rd place, bronze medalist(s)	France	1:26.33,60

Women
Rank	Nation	Time
1st place, gold medalist(s)	United Kingdom	1:36.25,47
2nd place, silver medalist(s)	Italy; Nadia Ejjafini; Valeria Straneo; Elena Romagnolo; Claudia Pinna; Silvia Weissteiner; Federica Dal Ri	1:36.40,13
3rd place, bronze medalist(s)	Portugal	1:36.51,26
