= 2009 European 10,000m Cup =

- Organisers: EAA
- Edition: 13th
- Date: 9 June
- Host city: (Portugal) Ribeira Brava
- Events: 2

The 2009 European 10,000m Cup, was the 13th edition of the European 10,000m Cup took place on 9 June in Ribeira Brava, Portugal.

== Individual ==
=== Men ===
Rank	Athlete	Country	Time	Notes
1st place, gold medalist(s)	José Manuel Martínez	Spain	27.57,61	(SB)
2nd place, silver medalist(s)	Rui Pedro Silva	Portugal	28.01,63	(PB)
3rd place, bronze medalist(s)	José Rocha	Portugal	28.15,44	(PB)
4	Sergey Ivanov	Russia	28.24,83	(SB)
5	Manuel Ángel Penas	Spain	28.25,10	(PB)
6	Yevgeniy Rybakov	Russia	28.26,39	(SB)
7	Monder Rizki	Belgium	28.38,27	(SB)
8	Denis Mayaud	France	28.38,66	(PB)
9	Anatoliy Rybakov	Russia	28.44,75	(SB)
10	José Ramos	Portugal	28.47,49	(SB)

=== Women ===
Rank	Athlete	Country	Time	Notes
1st place, gold medalist(s)	Inês Monteiro	Portugal	31.34,17	(PB)
2nd place, silver medalist(s)	Olivera Jevtić	Serbia	31.35,92	(SB)
3rd place, bronze medalist(s)	Dulce Félix	Portugal	31.40,60	(PB)
4	Ana Dias	Portugal	31.42,94	(SB)
5	Christelle Daunay	France	32.02,03	(SB)
6	Fernanda Ribeiro	Portugal	32.20,08	(SB)
7	Christine Bardelle	France	32.42,82	(PB)
8	Marisa Barros	Portugal	33.04,58	(PB)
9	Claire Hallissey	United Kingdom	33.17,13	(PB)
10	Maria Sig Møller	Denmark	33.18,40	(PB)

== Team ==
In italic the participants whose result did not go into the team's total time, but awarded with medals.

Men
Rank	Nation	Time
1st place, gold medalist(s)	Portugal	1:25.04,56
2nd place, silver medalist(s)	Russia	1:25.35,97
3rd place, bronze medalist(s)	Spain	1:25.40,00

Women
Rank	Nation	Time
1st place, gold medalist(s)	Portugal	1:34.57,71
2nd place, silver medalist(s)	United Kingdom	1:40.44,06
