= 2010 European 10,000m Cup =

- Organisers: EAA
- Edition: 14th
- Date: 5 June
- Host city: (France) Marseille
- Events: 2

The 2010 European 10,000m Cup, was the 14th edition of the European 10,000m Cup took place on 5 June in Marseille, France.

== Individual ==
=== Men ===
Rank	Athlete	Country	Time	Notes
1st place, gold medalist(s)	Mo Farah	United Kingdom	27.28,86	(PB)
2nd place, silver medalist(s)	Abdellatif Meftah	France	28.12,83	(PB)
3rd place, bronze medalist(s)	José Manuel Martínez	Spain	28.13,82	(SB)
4	Rui Pedro Silva	Portugal	28.17,39	(SB)
5	Marcin Chabowski	Poland	28.31,12	(SB)
6	Jan Fitschen	Germany	28.32,20	(SB)
7	Aleksey Reunkov	Russia	28.33,22	(SB)
8	Daniele Meucci	Italy	28.39,05	
9	José Rocha	Portugal	28.44,05	(SB)
10	Arkadiusz Gardzielewski	Poland	28.44,19	(PB)

=== Women ===
Rank	Athlete	Country	Time	Notes
1st place, gold medalist(s)	Inês Monteiro	Portugal	31.13,58	(PB)
2nd place, silver medalist(s)	Sabrina Mockenhaupt	Germany	31.23,86	(SB)
3rd place, bronze medalist(s)	Sara Moreira	Portugal	31.26,55	(PB)
4	Meryem Erdogan	Turkey	31.55,53	(NJR)
5	Christelle Daunay	France	32.02,04	(SB)
6	Freya Murray	United Kingdom	32.23,44	(PB)
7	Fernanda Ribeiro	Portugal	32.25,61	(SB)
8	Karolina Jarzynska	Poland	32.44,40	(PB)
9	Irina Mikitenko	Germany	32.48,69	(SB)
10	Hayley Yelling-Higham	United Kingdom	32.49,07	(SB)

== Team ==
In italic the participants whose result did not go into the team's total time, but awarded with medals.

Men
Rank	Nation	Time
1st place, gold medalist(s)	France	1:25.47,40
2nd place, silver medalist(s)	Portugal	1:25.59,39
3rd place, bronze medalist(s)	Russia	1:26.04,18

Women
Rank	Nation	Time
1st place, gold medalist(s)	Belarus	1:35.05,74
2nd place, silver medalist(s)	United Kingdom	1:38.21,40
3rd place, bronze medalist(s)	Portugal	1:39.25.80
