= Iberian 10,000 Metres Championships =

The Iberian 10,000 Metres Championships or Iberian Trophy (Portuguese: Troféu Ibérico; Spanish: Trofeo Ibérico) is an annual team track running competition over 10,000 metres that is contested between athletes from Portugal and Spain. The event has been held over two separate periods. Launched in 1991, the competition originally ran for six editions, but was made defunct by the European 10000 Metres Challenge in 1997. That competition was expanded further as the European Cup 10,000m in 2005. A desire to resume a bi-national event saw the relaunch of the original event under the title of the "Iberian Trophy" in 2011.

The competition consists of two elements: an individual aspect and a team aspect. The team competition is decided by combining the finishing times of each nations four best performing athletes. There are two senior races, one for each of the sexes. On top of this, the host nation incorporates its nation championship into the race, so the host's leading athlete is also declared the national champion. Guest athletes are a common feature and, although their times and finishing positions are recorded, they are not considered part of the international Iberian Trophy race.

== Editions ==
Edition	Year	Host city	Host country	Date	No. of athletes
1st	1991	Vigo	Spain	11 May	
2nd	1992	Maia	Portugal	25 April	
3rd	1993	Getxo	Spain	2 May	
4th	1994	Braga	Portugal	9 April	
5th	1995	Cáceres	Spain	8 April(?)	
6th	1996	Leiria	Portugal	6 April	
7th	2011	Pontevedra	Spain	2 April	22 men, 21 women
8th	2012	Lisbon	Portugal	24 March	36 men, 28 women
9th	2013	Mataró	Spain	6 April	18 men, 28 women
10th	2014	Lisbon	Portugal	29 March	24 men, 31 women

== Champions ==
Year	Men's team	Men's individual	Women's team	Women's individual
1991^{[nb1]}	?	Dionísio Castro (POR)	?	Fernanda Marques (POR)
1992	?	Domingos Castro (POR)	?	Fernanda Ribeiro (POR)
1993	?	José Carlos Adán (ESP)	?	Albertina Dias (POR)
1994	?	Paulo Guerra (POR)	?	Conceição Ferreira (POR)
1995	?	Paulo Guerra (POR)	?	Albertina Dias (POR)
1996	?	Alejandro Gómez (ESP)	?	Julia Vaquero (ESP)
2011^{nb2}	Portugal	Rui Silva (POR)	Portugal	Ana Dulce Félix (POR)
2012	Portugal	Manuel Ángel Penas (ESP)	Portugal	Gema Barrachina (ESP)
2013^{[nb3]}	Spain	Carles Castillejo (ESP)	Spain	Carla Salomé Rocha (POR)
2014	Spain	Alemayehu Bezabeh (ESP)	Spain	Jéssica Augusto (POR)

- ^{nb1} The 1991 individual women's race was won by guest athlete Delilah Asiago of Kenya.
- ^{nb2} The 2011 individual races were won by Kenya guest athletes Vincent Rono and Vivian Cheruiyot.
- ^{nb3} The 2013 individual women's race was won by guest athlete Trihas Gebre Aunoon of Ethiopia. She later became a Spanish citizen.
