= 2011 European Cross Country Championships =

- Organisers: EAA
- Edition: 18th
- Date: 11 December
- Host city: Velenje, Slovenia
- Events: 6
- Distances: 9870 m – Men; 8170 m – Women; 8170 m – U23 men 6070 m – U23 women 6070 m – Junior men 3970 m – Junior women
- Official website: Velenje 2011

The 2011 European Cross Country Championships was the 18th edition of the cross country running competition for European athletes which was held in Velenje, Slovenia on 11 December.

Atelaw Yeshetela of Belgium won the men's title to become the country's first ever champion at the competition. The French men's team retained their title from 2010. Fionnuala Britton was the winner in the senior women's race, becoming Ireland's second champion in the history of the event after Catherina McKiernan (who won the inaugural race in 1994). The senior women's team race was won by Great Britain.

== Preparation ==
The city won the rights to the event at the 120th meeting of the European Athletics Council in 2007. It was the second time that Velenje hosted the event, following its hosting of the 1999 edition. The event mascot, Ligi (an anthropomorphic black mole), returned after its introduction in 1999. In the intervening years, the mascot was used for a number of events in the city and represents the importance of lignite (brown coal) in the city's economy.

Alongside international television broadcasts, European Athletics broadcast the event live on the governing body's official website.

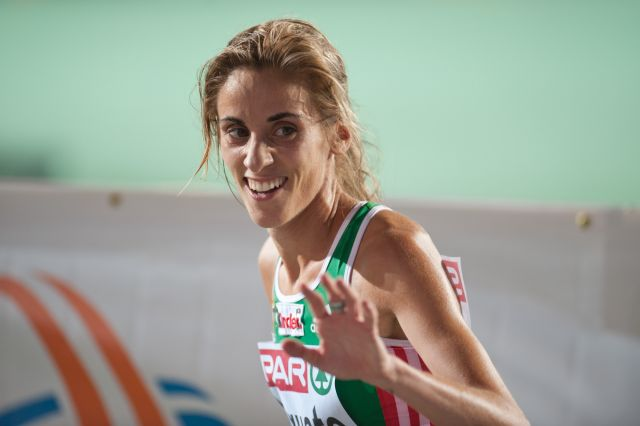
The 2010 champion Jéssica Augusto was absent from the competition.

The championships featured six races: there were senior, under-23, and under-20 junior categories for each of the sexes. The men's senior race had a 9870-metre distance, while the women's senior and men's under-23 races were held over 8040 m. The men's junior race and women's under-23 contests were over 6070 m. The junior women had a 3970 m distance to cover. The course for the competition was based near the grounds of the Atletski Klub Velenje (Velenje Athletics Club). It had a relatively flat race profile with no significant inclines and comprised two loops (a 1500 m loop and a shorter 300 m circuit).

Five European Athletics permit meetings preceded the championships on the weekend of 26–27 November: the Skanzen meeting in Budapest, the Cross de l'Acier in Leffrinckoucke, the Warandecross in Tilburg, the Lotto CrossCup van West-Vlaanderen in Roeselare, and the Cross Internacional Valle de Llodio in Llodio. These races and national-level trial events were the primary means of athletes gaining selection for the championships.

Ukraine's Serhiy Lebid returned to defend his 2010 title and the nine-time champion was the pre-race favourite. The 2010 women's champion, Jéssica Augusto, did not enter the competition as she was still recovering from her outing at the 2011 New York City Marathon. The other leading finishers from 2010 – Binnaz Uslu, Ana Dulce Félix and Fionnuala Britton – were among the favourites for the women's race.

== Race results ==
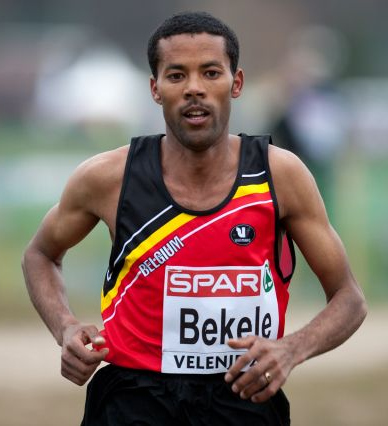
Atelaw Yeshetela became the first Belgian to win the competition.

=== Senior men ===
Individual race
Rank	Athlete	Country	Time (m:s)
Gold medal	Atelaw Yeshetela	Belgium	29:15
Silver medal	Ayad Lamdassem	Spain	29:20
Bronze medal	José Rocha	Portugal	29:21
4	Hassan Chahdi	France	29:22
5	Joseph Sweeney	Ireland	29:23
6	Javier Guerra	Spain	29:24
7	Morhad Amdouni	France	29:26
8	Khalid Choukoud	Netherlands	29:27
9	Andy Vernon	Great Britain	29:39
10	Morten Toft Munkholm	Denmark	29:42
11	Mohktar Benhari	France	29:43
12	Benjamin Malaty	France	29:44

Teams
Rank	Team	Points
Gold medal	France; Chahdi; Amdouni; Mokhtari; Malaty	34
Silver medal	Great Britain; Vernon; Ryan McLeod; James Walsh; Mark Draper	59
Bronze medal	Spain; Lamdassem; Guerra; Ricardo Serrano; Yousseff Aakaou	67
4	Portugal	76
5	Italy	84
6	Ireland	116
7	Denmark	135
8	Germany	160

- Totals: 76 entrants, 76 starters, 73 finishers, 10 teams.

=== Senior women ===
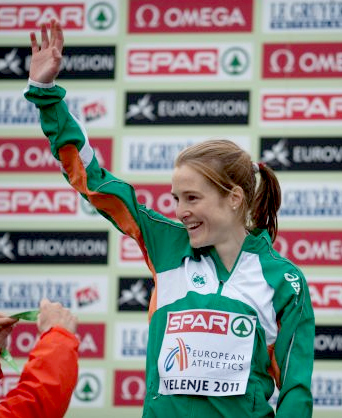
Ireland's Fionnuala Britton won the women's title.

Individual race
Rank	Athlete	Country	Time (m:s)
Gold medal	Fionnuala Britton	Ireland	25:55
Silver medal	Ana Dulce Félix	Portugal	26:02
Bronze medal	Gemma Steel	Great Britain	26:04
4	Nadia Ejjafini	Italy	26:13
5	Adriënne Herzog	Netherlands	26:34
6	Sophie Duarte	France	26:36
7	Roxana Bârcă	Romania	26:39
8	Leonor Carneiro	Portugal	26:39
9	Simret Restle	Germany	26:40
10	Valeria Straneo	Italy	26:42
11	Christine Bardelle	France	26:50
12	Freya Murray	Great Britain	26:51

Teams
Rank	Team	Points
Gold medal	Great Britain; Steel; Murray; Julia Bleasdale; Elle Baker	42
Silver medal	Portugal; Félix; Carneiro; Anália Rosa; Ana Dias	51
Bronze medal	Germany; Restle; Sabrina Mockenhaupt; Verena Dreier; Susanne Hahn	83
4	France	83
5	Romania	88
6	Italy	101
7	Spain	116
8	Ireland	133

- Totals: 54 entrants, 54 starters, 49 finishers, 8 teams.

=== Under-23 men ===
Individual race
Rank	Athlete	Country	Time (m:s)
Gold medal	Florian Carvalho	France	23:44
Silver medal	James Wilkinson	Great Britain	23:47
Bronze medal	Sondre Nordstad Moen	Norway	23:48
4	Richard Ringer	Germany	23:48
5	Siarhei Platonau	Belarus	23:51
6	Abdi Nageeye	Netherlands	23:54
7	Simon Denissel	France	23:56
8	Mitch Goose	Great Britain	23:57
9	Sindre Buraas	Norway	24:02
10	Cihat Ulus	Turkey	24:03
11	Patrick Nasti	Italy	24:04
12	Jesper Van Der Wielen	Netherlands	24:04

Teams
Rank	Team	Points
Gold medal	Norway; Moen; Buraas; Henrik Ingebrigtsen; Hans Kristian Fløystad	58
Silver medal	Great Britain; Wilkinson; Goose; Derek Hawkins; Phillip Berntsen	76
Bronze medal	France; Carvalho; Denissel; Mattheiu Garel; Bryan Cantero	94
4	Spain	97
5	Russia	107
6	Belgium	128
7	Germany	131
8	Ukraine	141

- Totals: 99 entrants, 98 starters, 97 finishers, 15 teams.

=== Under-23 women ===
Individual race
Rank	Athlete	Country	Time (m:s)
Gold medal	Emma Pallant	Great Britain	19:57
Silver medal	Naomi Taschimowitz	Great Britain	20:02
Bronze medal	Corrina Harrer	Germany	20:03
4	Stephanie Twell	Great Britain	20:03
5	Anna Hahner	Germany	20:05
6	Viktoriya Pohoryelska	Ukraine	20:08
7	Hannah Walker	Great Britain	20:12
8	Clémence Calvin	France	20:16
9	Carla Salomé Rocha	Portugal	20:20
10	Jennifer Wenth	Austria	20:26
11	Laura Suur	Estonia	20:28
12	Lisa Hahner	Germany	20:31

Teams
Rank	Team	Points
Gold medal	Great Britain; Pallant; Taschimowitz; Twell; Walker	14
Silver medal	Germany; Harrer; Anna Hahner; Lisa Hahner; Jana Soethout	41
Bronze medal	Portugal; Rocha; Catarina Ribeiro; Daniela Cunha; Sónia Catarina Lima	77
4	France	99
5	Turkey	101
6	Spain	102

- Totals: 43 entrants, 43 starters, 42 finishers, 6 teams.

=== Junior men ===
Individual race
Rank	Athlete	Country	Time (m:s)
Gold medal	Ilgizar Safiullin	Russia	17:49
Silver medal	Richard Goodman	Great Britain	17:51
Bronze medal	Vladimir Nikitin	Russia	17:51
4	Roman Collenot-Spiret	France	17:53
5	Pieter-Jan Hannes	Belgium	17:58
6	Rui Pinto	Portugal	18:01
7	Andrey Rusakov	Russia	18:07
8	Jonathan Hay	Great Britain	18:09
9	Kieren Clements	Great Britain	18:10
10	Yehor Zhukov	Ukraine	18:10
11	Niall Fleming	Great Britain	18:18
12	Daniel Arce	Spain	18:20

Teams
Rank	Team	Points
Gold medal	Great Britain; Goodman; Hay; Clements; Fleming	30
Silver medal	Russia; Safiulin; Nikitin; Rusakov; Mikhail Strelkov	60
Bronze medal	France; Collenot-Spiret; Djilali Bedrani; Julien Detre; Francois Barrer	103
4	Ukraine	109
5	Belgium	118
6	Denmark	120
7	Germany	127
8	Spain	134

- Totals: 114 entrants, 112 starters, 109 finishers, 19 teams.

=== Junior women ===
Individual race
Rank	Athlete	Country	Time (m:s)
Gold medal	Emelia Gorecka	Great Britain	13:13
Silver medal	Ioana Doaga	Romania	13:14
Bronze medal	Amela Terzić	Serbia	13:22
4	Gulshat Fazlitdinova	Russia	13:24
5	Zenobie Vangansbeke	Belgium	13:32
6	Annabel Gummow	Great Britain	13:34
7	Svetlana Ryazantseva	Russia	13:37
8	Esma Aydemir	Turkey	13:41
9	Gesa-Felicitas Krause	Germany	13:42
10	Maya Rehberg	Germany	13:47
11	Elena Burkard	Germany	13:50
12	Mariya Hodakyvska	Ukraine	13:51

Teams
Rank	Team	Points
Gold medal	Great Britain; Gorecka; Gummow; Gemma Kersey; Katie Holt	40
Silver medal	Russia; Fazlitdinova; Ryazantseva; Alexandra Gulyaeva; Vera Vasilyeva	43
Bronze medal	Germany; Krause; Rehberg; Burkard; Jannika John	50
4	Romania	75
5	Netherlands	117
6	Belgium	122
7	Spain	126
8	Turkey	132

- Totals: 93 entrants, 93 starters, 92 finishers, 16 teams.

== Total medal table ==
Rank	Nation	Gold	Silver	Bronze	Total
1	Great Britain (GBR)	6	5	1	12
2	France (FRA)	2	0	2	4
3	Russia (RUS)	1	2	1	4
4	Norway (NOR)	1	0	1	2
5	Belgium (BEL)	1	0	0	1
5	Ireland (IRL)	1	0	0	1
7	Portugal (POR)	0	2	2	4
8	Germany (GER)	0	1	3	4
9	Spain (ESP)	0	1	1	2
10	Romania (ROM)	0	1	0	1
11	Serbia (SRB)	0	0	1	1
Totals (11 entries)		12	12	12	36

- Note: Totals include both individual and team medals, with medals in the team competition counting as one medal.
