= 2011 European 10,000m Cup =

- Organisers: EAA
- Edition: 15th
- Date: 4 June
- Host city: (Norway) Oslo
- Events: 2

The 2011 European 10,000m Cup, was the 15th edition of the European 10,000m Cup took place on 4 June in Oslo, Norway.

== Individual ==
=== Men ===
Rank	Athlete	Country	Time	Notes
1st place, gold medalist(s)	Youssef El Kalai	Portugal	28.20,03	(PB)
2nd place, silver medalist(s)	José Manuel Martínez	Spain	28.24,16	(SB)
3rd place, bronze medalist(s)	André Pollmächer	Germany	28.39,55	(SB)
4	Rafael Iglesias	Spain	28.41,61	(PB)
5	Sondre Nordstad Moen	Norway	28.43,90	(PB)
6	Khalid Choukoud	Netherlands	28.53,63	(PB)
7	Sindre Buraas	Norway	28.56,46	(PB)
8	Pablo Villalobos	Spain	28.59,12	(SB)
9	Patrick Stitzinger	Netherlands	29.01,73	(SB)
10	Stéphane Lefrand	France	29.02,06	(SB)

=== Women ===
Rank	Athlete	Country	Time	Notes
1st place, gold medalist(s)	Sara Moreira	Portugal	31.39,11	(SB)
2nd place, silver medalist(s)	Christelle Daunay	France	31.44,84	(PB)
3rd place, bronze medalist(s)	Sabrina Mockenhaupt	Germany	31.57,23	(SB)
4	Helen Clitheroe	United Kingdom	32.11,29	(PB)
5	Nadia Ejjafini	Italy	32.14,63	(PB)
6	Krisztina Papp	Hungary	32.36,32	(SB)
7	Sviatlana Kudzelich	Belarus	32.40,61	(PB)
8	Rosaria Console	Italy	32.47,70	(PB)
9	Elena Romagnolo	Italy	32.48,25	(SB)
10	Christine Bardelle	France	32.59,31	(SB)

== Team ==
In italic the participants whose result did not go into the team's total time, but awarded with medals.

Men
Rank	Nation	Time
1st place, gold medalist(s)	Spain	1:24.04,89
2nd place, silver medalist(s)	France	1:27.51,97
3rd place, bronze medalist(s)	Portugal	1:28.16,51

Women
Rank	Nation	Time
1st place, gold medalist(s)	Italy; Nadia Ejjafini; Rosaria Console; Elena Romagnolo; Federica Dal Ri; Laila Soufyane; Silvia Weissteiner	1:37.50,55
2nd place, silver medalist(s)	Portugal	1:39.17,61
3rd place, bronze medalist(s)	Belarus	1:39.53,55
