= 2014 European 10,000m Cup =

- Organisers: EAA
- Edition: 18th
- Date: 7 June
- Host city: (North Macedonia) Skopje
- Events: 2

The 2014 European 10,000m Cup, was the 18th edition of the European 10,000m Cup took place on 7 June in Skopje, Macedonia.

== Results ==
In italic the participants whose result did not go into the team's total time, but awarded with medals.

=== Men ===
| Event | GOLD | | SILVER | | BRONZE | |
| Individual | (Turkey) Polat Kemboi Arıkan | 28:17,14 | (Turkey) Ali Kaya | 28:17,82 PB | (France) Yassine Mandour | 28:22,30 PB |
| Team | Turkey; Polat Kemboi Arıkan; Ali Kaya; Mehmet Akkoyun | 1:25:30,44 | Italy; Jamel Chatbi; Ahmed El Mazoury; Gian Marco Buttazzo; Manuel Cominotto; Paolo Zanatta | 1:27:36,24 | Ukraine; Roman Romanenko; Ivan Strebkov; Dmytro Lashyn | 1:27:57,97 |

=== Women ===
| Event | GOLD | | SILVER | | BRONZE | |
| Individual | (France) Clémence Calvin | 31:52,86 PB | (Portugal) Jéssica Augusto | 31:55,56 | (Portugal) Sara Moreira | 32:01,42 |
| Team | Portugal; Jéssica Augusto; Sara Moreira; Sara Ribeiro | 1:36:53,43 | France; Clémence Calvin; Laila Traby; Laure Funten | 1:39:34,38 | Spain; Gema Barrachina; Lidia Rodríguez; Paula González | 1:40:16,15 |
