= Claudia Pinna =

Italian long-distance runner

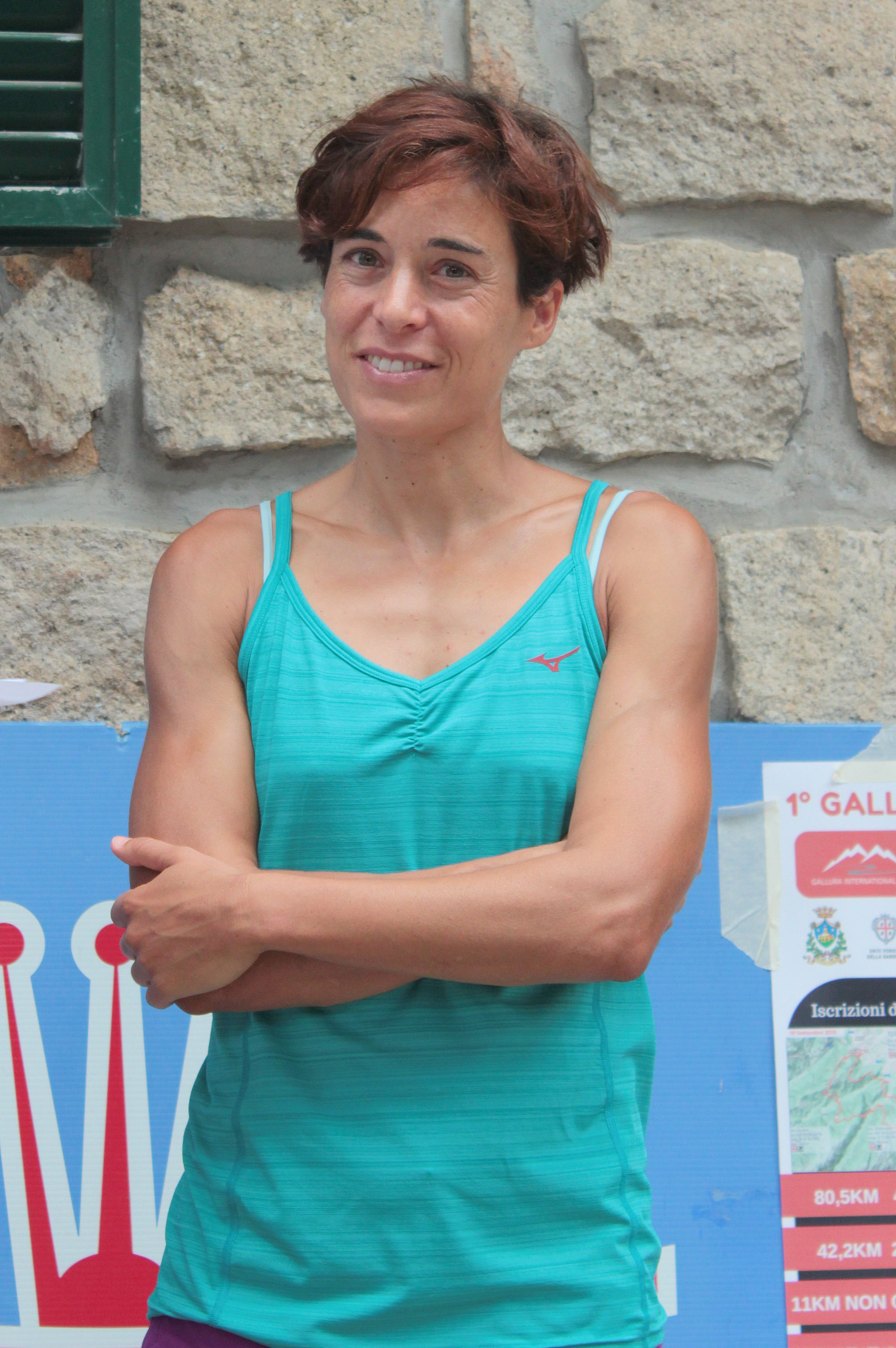

Personal information
- Nationality: Italian
- Born: 4 December 1977 (age 48) San Gavino Monreale, Italy
- Height: 1.63 m (5 ft 4 in)
- Weight: 48 kg (106 lb)

Sport
- Country: Italy
- Sport: Athletics
- Event: Long-distance running
- Club: CUS Cagliari

Achievements and titles
- Personal bests: 5000 m: 16:03.77 (2006); 10,000 m: 16:03.77 (2012); Half marathon: 1:12:44 (2007)
Medal record
European 10,000m Cup
Silver medal – second place	2012 Bilbao	10,000 m team
Bronze medal – third place	2015 Cagliari	10,000 m team

Claudia Pinna (born 4 December 1977) is an Italian female long-distance runner, who won two medals at international senior level with the Italian team.

== Biography ==
She won three national championships at individual senior level.

== Achievements ==
Year	Competition	Venue	Position	Event	Time	Notes
2007	World Half Marathon Championships	(Italy) Udine	30th	Half marathon	1:12:44	PB
2007	World Half Marathon Championships	(Italy) Udine	7th	Half marathon team	3:35:05	

== National titles ==
- Italian Athletics Championships
  - 5000 metres: 2007
  - 10,000 metres: 2015
  - Half marathon: 2013

== See also ==
- Italian team at the running events
