= 1999 European 10,000m Challenge =

1999 European 10,000m Cup
- Organisers: EAA
- Edition: 3rd
- Date: 10 April
- Host city: (Spain) Barakaldo
- Events: 2

The 1999 European 10,000m Cup, was the 3rd edition of the European 10,000m Cup (the original name in 1999 was European 10,000m Challenge) and took place on 10 April in Barakaldo, Spain.

== Individual ==
=== Men ===
Rank	Athlete	Country	Time
1st place, gold medalist(s)	Alberto García	Spain	27:46.12
2nd place, silver medalist(s)	Bruno Toledo	Spain	27:49.06
3rd place, bronze medalist(s)	Francisco Javier Cortés	Spain	27:49.58

=== Women ===
Rank	Athlete	Country	Time
1st place, gold medalist(s)	Paula Radcliffe	United Kingdom	30:40.70
2nd place, silver medalist(s)	Irina Mikitenko	Germany	31:38.68
3rd place, bronze medalist(s)	Ana Dias	Portugal	31:39.52

== Team ==
In italic the participants whose result did not go into the team's total time, but awarded with medals.

=== Men ===
Rank	Country	Time
1st place, gold medalist(s)	Spain	1:23:24.76
2nd place, silver medalist(s)	Portugal	1:24:11.08
3rd place, bronze medalist(s)	Italy; Simone Zanon; Rachid Berradi; Giuliano Battocletti; Andrea Arlati	1:24:45.85

=== Women ===
Rank	Country	Time
1st place, gold medalist(s)	Portugal	1:35:04.12
2nd place, silver medalist(s)	Italy; Maria Guida; Silvia Sommaggio; Maura Viceconte; Sabrina Varrone; Lucilla Andreucci	1:35:55.47
3rd place, bronze medalist(s)	Spain	1:36:59.65
