= 2015 European 10,000m Cup =

- Organisers: EAA
- Edition: 19th
- Date: 6 June
- Host city: (Italy) Cagliari
- Venue: Stadio Amsicora
- Events: 2

The 2015 European 10,000m Cup, was the 19th edition of the European 10,000m Cup took place on 6 June in Cagliari, Italia.

== Results ==
In italic the participants whose result did not go into the team's total time, but awarded with medals.

=== Men ===
Event	GOLD		SILVER		BRONZE	
Individual	(Turkey) Polat Kemboi Arıkan	28:09,47	(Spain) Juan Pérez	28:25,66 PB	(Italy) Jamel Chatbi	28:39,01
Team	Italy; Jamel Chatbi; Stefano La Rosa; Ahmed El Mazoury; Daniele D'Onofrio; Najibe Salami	1:26:23,97	Spain; Juan Pérez; Alemayehu Bezabeh; José España	1:27:09,28	Turkey; Polat Kemboi Arıkan; Cihat Ulus; Şeref Dirli	1:27:51,98

=== Women ===
Event	GOLD		SILVER		BRONZE	
Individual	(Spain) Trihas Gebre	32:14,94	(Italy) Valeria Straneo	32:32,41	(United Kingdom) Lily Partridge	33:02,03
Team	United Kingdom; Lily Patridge; Jess Coulson; Joanne Pavey	1:39:23,86	Spain; Trihas Gebre; Paula González; Nuria Lugueros	1:39:44,91	Italy; Valeria Straneo; Anna Incerti; Claudia Pinna; Valeria Roffino; Federica Dal Ri	1:39:58,66
