= Antonio Armuzzi =

Italian long-distance runner (born 1969)

Personal information
- National team: Italy (5 caps from 1996 to 1997)
- Born: 14 August 1969 (age 56) Como, Italy

Sport
- Country: Italy
- Sport: Athletics
- Event: Long-distance running

Achievements and titles
- Personal bests: Half marathon: 1:02:46 (1997); Marathon: 2:25.20 (2009)
Medal record
European 10,000m Cup
Silver medal – second place	1997 Barkaldo	Team

Antonio Armuzzi (born 14 August 1969) is a former Italian male long-distance runner who competed at individual senior level at the IAAF World Half Marathon Championships.

He also won a medal with the national team at the European 10,000m Cup.
