= Simone Zanon =

Italian long-distance runner

Personal information
- Full name: Simeone Zanon
- Nationality: Italian
- Born: 30 May 1975 (age 51)
- Height: 1.82 m (6 ft 0 in)
- Weight: 64 kg (141 lb)

Sport
- Country: Italy
- Sport: Athletics
- Event: Long-distance running
- Club: G.S. Fiamme Oro

Achievements and titles
- Personal bests: 5000 m: 13:22.48 (1999); Half marathon: 1:05:03 (2000)
Medal record
Universiade
Gold medal – first place	1997 Catania	5000 m
European 10,000m Cup
Gold medal – first place	2002 Camaiore	Team
Silver medal – second place	1997 Barakaldo	Team
Bronze medal – third place	1999 Barakaldo	Team
European U23 Championships
Gold medal – first place	1997 Turku	5000 m

Simone Zanon (born 30 May 1975) is a former Italian male long-distance runner who competed at five editions of the IAAF World Cross Country Championships at senior level (1996, 1997, 2000, 2002, 2005). He won two national championships at senior level (5000 m: 1997, 2005).

== Achievements ==
Year	Competition	Venue	Position	Event	Time	Notes
1997	European U23 Championships	(Finland) Turku	1st	5000 m	13.45.60	
1997	Summer Universiade	(Italy) Catania	1st	5000 m	13.57.54	
