= Daniele D'Onofrio =

Italian long-distance runner (born 1993)

Personal information
- Nationality: Italian
- Born: 8 October 1993 (age 32) Castel di Sangro, Italy

Sport
- Country: Italy
- Sport: Athletics
- Event: Long-distance running
- Club: G.S. Fiamme Oro

Achievements and titles
- Personal bests: 10,000 m: 29:01.93 (2016); Half marathon: 1:03:29 (2016)
Medal record
Event	1st	2nd	3rd
European Championships	0	0	1
European 10,000m Cup	2	0	0
Total	2	0	1
European Championships
Bronze medal – third place	2016 Amsterdam	Half marathon team

Daniele D'Onofrio (born 8 October 1993) is an Italian male long-distance runner, who won two gold medal with the Italian team at the European 10,000m Cup.

== Biography ==
His most important international achievement was the bronze medal won at the 2016 European Athletics Championships.

== Achievements ==
Year	Competition	Venue	Position	Event	Time	Notes
2015	European 10,000m Cup	(Italy) Cagliari	20th	10,000 m	30:15.65	
2015	European 10,000m Cup	(Italy) Cagliari	1st	10,000 m team	1:26:23,97	
2016	European 10,000m Cup	(Turkey) Mersin	14th	10,000 m	30:07.87	
2016	European 10,000m Cup	(Turkey) Mersin	1st	10,000 m team	1:25:39,81	
2016	European Championships	(Netherlands) Amsterdam	65th	Half marathon	1:08:41	
2016	European Championships	(Netherlands) Amsterdam	3rd	Half marathon team	3:12.41	

== National titles ==
- Italian Athletics Championships
  - Half marathon: 2016, 2020
