= 2016 European 10,000m Cup =

- Organisers: EAA
- Edition: 20th
- Date: 5 June
- Host city: (Turkey) Mersin
- Venue: Nevin Yanit Athletics Complex
- Events: 2

The 2016 European 10,000m Cup, was the 20th edition of the European 10,000m Cup took place on 5 June in Mersin, Turkey.

== Results ==
In italic the participants whose result did not go into the team's total time, but awarded with medals.

=== Men ===
Event	GOLD		SILVER		BRONZE	
Individual	(Italy) Daniele Meucci	28:24,71	(Spain) Juan Pérez	28:28,93	(Italy) Jamel Chatbi	28:32,85
Team	Italy; Daniele Meucci; Jamel Chatbi; Stefano La Rosa; Najibe Salami; Daniele D'Onofrio	1:25:39,81	Spain; Juan Pérez; Alemayehu Bezabeh; José España	1:27:00,23	Ukraine; Dmytro Lashyn; Artem Kazban; Dmytro Siruk	1:27:30,55

=== Women ===
Event	GOLD		SILVER		BRONZE	
Individual	(Turkey) Esma Aydemir	33:33,38 PB	(Italy) Rosaria Console	32:32,41	(United Kingdom) Jenny Nesbitt	33:45,46
Team	United Kingdom; Jenny Nesbitt; Lauren Deadman; Louise Small	1:42:45,94	Turkey; Esma Aydemir; Sevilay Eytemiş; Fadime Suna	1:42:50,57	Spain; Sonia Bejarano; Gema Martin; Raquel Gómez	1:42:51,82
