= Sabrina Varrone =

Italian long-distance runner

Personal information
- National team: Italy (12 caps 1997-2004)
- Born: 24 April 1972 (age 54) Carignano, Italy

Sport
- Country: Italy
- Sport: Athletics
- Events: Long-distance running; Cross country running

Achievements and titles
- Personal best: Half marathon: 1:18:30 (2001)
Medal record
European 10,000m Cup
Silver medal – second place	1999 Barakaldo	Team

Sabrina Varrone (born 24 April 1972) is a former Italian female long-distance runner and cross-country runner who competed at individual senior level at the World Athletics Cross Country Championships (1997, 1999, 2000).

== Biography ==
Varrone won a silver medal at senior level with the national team at the 1999 European 10,000m Cup. She also won Cross della Vallagarina in 1999.

== National titles ==
She won three national championships at individual senior level.

- Italian Cross Country Championships
  - Long race: 1998, 1999
  - Short race: 2002

== See also ==
- Italian team at the running events
