= 2002 European 10,000m Challenge =

2002 European 10,000m Cup
- Organisers: EAA
- Edition: 6th
- Date: 6 April
- Host city: (Italy) Camaiore
- Events: 2

The 2002 European 10,000m Cup, was the 6th edition of the European 10,000m Cup (the original name in 2002 was European 10,000m Challenge) and took place on 6 April in Camaiore, Italy.

== Individual ==
=== Men ===
Rank	Athlete	Country	Time
1st place, gold medalist(s)	Dieter Baumann	Germany	27:38.51
2nd place, silver medalist(s)	José Ríos	Spain	27:38.82
3rd place, bronze medalist(s)	Marco Mazza	Italy	27:44.05

=== Women ===
Rank	Athlete	Country	Time
1st place, gold medalist(s)	Mihaela Botezan	Romania	31:19.74
2nd place, silver medalist(s)	Fernanda Ribeiro	Portugal	31:40.80
3rd place, bronze medalist(s)	María Luisa Larraga	Spain	31:45.85

== Team ==
In italic the participants whose result did not go into the team's total time, but awarded with medals.

=== Men ===
Rank	Country	Time
1st place, gold medalist(s)	Italy; Marco Mazza; Michele Gamba; Simone Zanon; Mattia Maccagnan	1:24:25.40
2nd place, silver medalist(s)	Spain	1:24:27.20
3rd place, bronze medalist(s)	Germany	1:24:35.38

=== Women ===
Rank	Country	Time
1st place, gold medalist(s)	Portugal	1:36:29.94
2nd place, silver medalist(s)	Spain	1:38:01.57
3rd place, bronze medalist(s)	Italy; Gloria Marconi; Agata Balsamo; Silvia Sommaggio; Rosita Rota Gelpi; Patrizia Tisi	1:38:31.51
