= Atelaw Yeshetela Bekele =

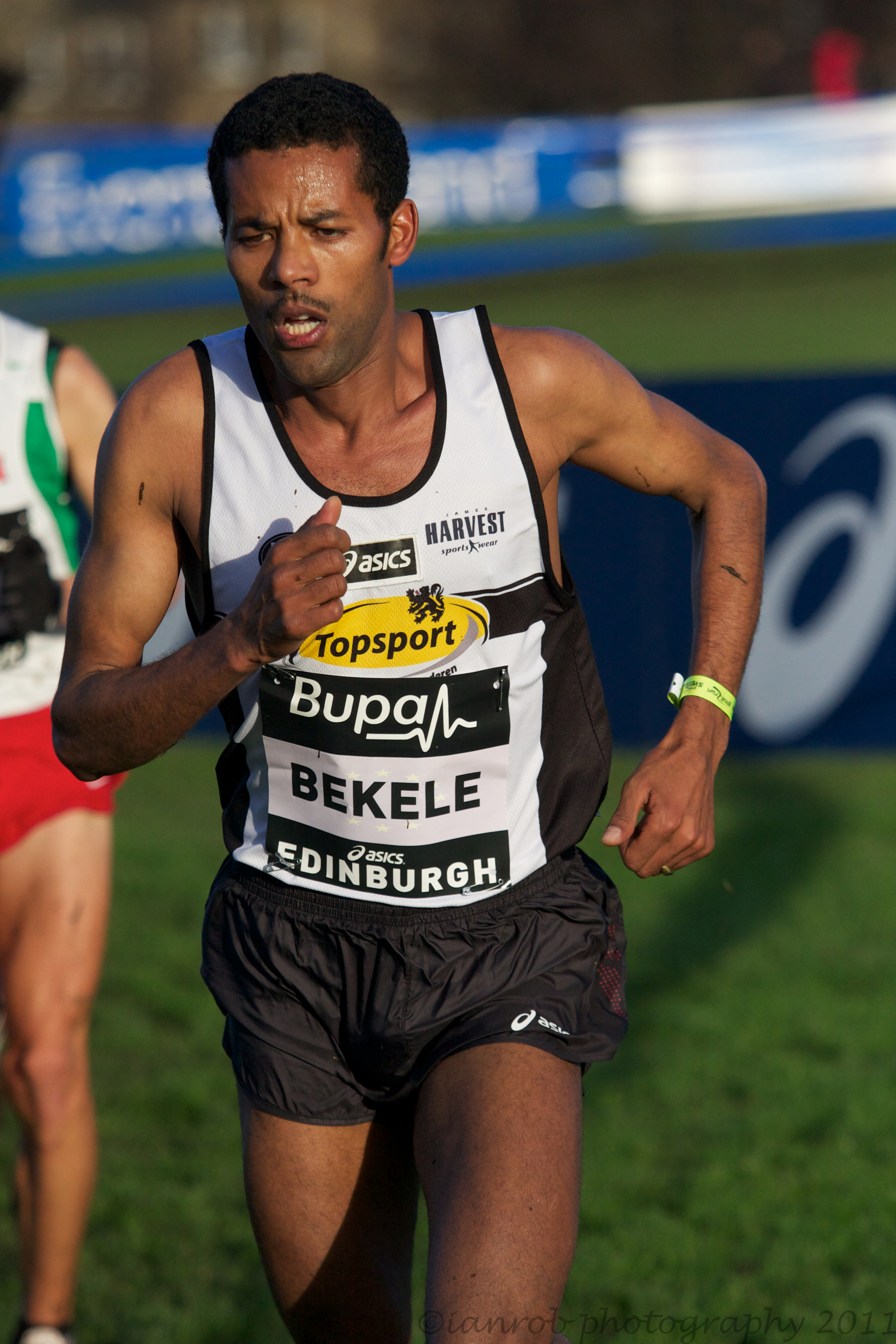
- Atelaw Yeshetela Bekele competing in the 8 km event in 2012.

Medal record

Men's athletics

Representing Belgium

European Cross Country Championships
Gold medal – first place	2011 Velenje	Senior race

Atelaw Yeshetela Bekele (born 4 December 1987) is an Ethiopian-born long-distance runner who competes internationally for Belgium. He was the winner at the European Cross Country Championships in 2011. Bekele's personal bests on the track are 13:43.20 minutes for the 5000 meters, and 29:47.60 minutes for the 10,000 meters. He is not related to Ethiopian runner Kenenisa Bekele.

== Career ==
Having moved to Belgium at the age of sixteen, he became a naturalised citizen of Belgium in November 2008. His first international appearance for his adopted country came at the 2008 European Cross Country Championships. He ran in the under-23 section of the competition, but failed to finish the race.

He had his first track running season in 2009, setting a 10,000 meters personal best at the Belgian Championships with a time of 29:47.60 minutes for second place. He gained selection in that event for the 2009 European Athletics U23 Championships, but again failed to finish on the international stage. Returning to the cross country running circuit, he had his first successes: he won the Lotto Cross Cup race in Mol and went on to claim the bronze medal in the under-23 race at the 2009 European Cross Country Championships.

In 2010 he competed on the global stage for the first time. Running as a senior, he was Belgium's only entrant at the 2010 IAAF World Cross Country Championships and he was 94th overall. He also represented Belgium at the European Cup 10000m, placing 14th in his race. In the winter cross country season, he reached the podium at the Warandeloop and CrossCup Mol races. He suffered an injury prior to the 2010 European Cross Country Championships, where he went on to finish 54th.

A significant personal best of 13:43.20 minutes over 5000 meters in Nijmegen in May 2011 marked the beginning of an improvement in Atelaw's running. After high-altitude training in Ethiopia, he returned to Europe and won the Lotto CrossCup Roeselare race. At the 2011 European Cross Country Championships he seized the lead after 2 km by increasing the pace and was never challenged thereafter, taking the gold medal five seconds ahead of runner-up Ayad Lamdassem. He was the top European behind Kenya's Isiah Koech at the Lotto Cross Cup Brussels meet later that month.

He ran at the 2012 Great Edinburgh Cross Country and was third in the long race.
