= Domenico D'Ambrosio =

Italian long-distance runner

Personal information
- Full name: Giovanni D'Ambrosio
- Nationality: Italian
- Born: 18 July 1975 (age 50)

Sport
- Country: Italy
- Sport: Athletics
- Event: Long-distance running

Achievements and titles
- Personal best: Half marathon: 1:02:35 (2000)
Medal record
European 10,000m Cup
Silver medal – second place	1997 Barakaldo	Team
Bronze medal – third place	2004 Maribor	Team

Domenico D'Ambrosio (born 18 July 1975) is a former Italian male long-distance runner who competed at five editions of the IAAF World Cross Country Championships at senior level (1997, 1998, 1999, 2001, 2003).
