= Ayad Lamdassem =

Spanish long-distance runner (born 1981)

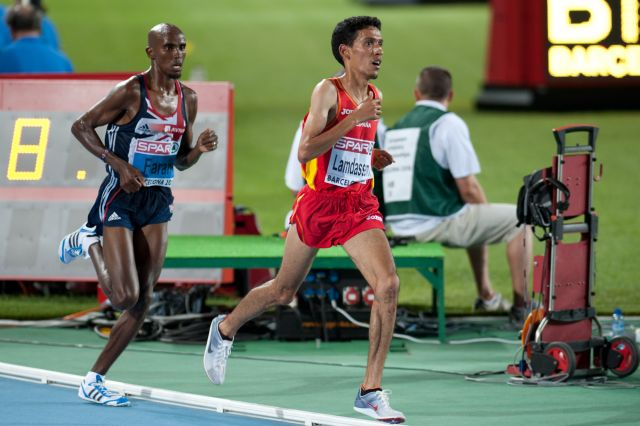
- Lamdassem ahead of Mo Farah during the 10,000 m at the 2010 European Athletics Championships

Personal information
- Full name: Ayad Lamdassem El Mouhcine
- Born: 11 October 1981 (age 44) Sidi Ifni, Morocco

Sport
- Country: Spain
- Sport: Athletics
Medal record
Ibero-American Championships
Gold medal – first place	2010 San Fernando	5000 m
European Cross Country Championships
Silver medal – second place	2010 Albufeira	10 km cross

Ayad Lamdassem El Mouhcine (born 11 October 1981) is a long-distance runner. Born in Morocco, he competes for Spain internationally. He has represented Spain twice in the 10,000 metres at the Summer Olympics (2008, 2012 and 2020) as well as the European Athletics Championships (2010, 2012).

Lamdassem has competed at the IAAF World Cross Country Championships on five occasions (once for Morocco and four times for Spain). He was the silver medallist at the European Cross Country Championships in 2010 and 2011. He was also a gold medallist at the 2010 Ibero-American Championships in Athletics. At the 2020 Valencia Marathon, he set the Spanish national record and earned a spot on the Spanish team for the Tokyo 2020 Olympic marathon, where he finished 5th.

His personal bests include 13:17.49 minutes for the 5000 metres, 27:45.58 min for the 10,000 m, 61:29 for the half marathon and 2:06:25 for the marathon.

== Career ==
He first arrived in Spain in 2002 as part of the Moroccan contingent for the World University Cross Country Championships, which was being held in Santiago de Compostela that year. However, he did not compete and instead deserted the team, using the opportunity to stay on in the country and train with other Moroccans in Valencia. He later moved to Lleida, working with coach Antonio Cánovas, and received citizenship in 2007 after five years of residency.

His first major competition for Spain came the following year in the form of the 2008 Summer Olympics. He ran in the 10,000 m race and finished in 24th place, just behind compatriot Carles Castillejo. He came fourth at the 2008 European Cross Country Championships at the end of the year, helping the Spanish men to the team title. He represented Spain twice at cross country in 2009, coming 30th at the 2009 IAAF World Cross Country Championships and fifth at the 2009 European Cross Country Championships, where Spain retained the team title. He also competed in the 2009 World Championships in Athletics, running in the 10,000 metres, but dropped out mid-race.

He won his first track medal at the 2010 Ibero-American Championships, taking the gold medal in the 5000 metres. At the Great Manchester Run he duelled against Haile Gebrselassie and ended up as runner-up some seven seconds behind the Ethiopian. Lamdassem was selected to run the 10,000 m at the 2010 European Athletics Championships in Barcelona. After leading early on, he eventually slowed on the final lap and missed the medals with a fourth-place finish. He started his 2010/11 cross country season with a third place at the Soria Cross Country in November. At the 2010 European Cross Country Championships he was the first runner to break from the front, although he was caught by Serhiy Lebid and finished as the silver medallist. Lamdassem also led the Spanish men to the bronze in the team competition. He competed at the San Silvestre Vallecana on New Year's Eve and was leading ahead of favourite Zersenay Tadese in the latter stages, but he took a wrong turn on the course, losing his leading margin and eventually finished as runner-up.

A third-place finish at the 2011 Great Edinburgh Cross Country helped the European team to the title. He took the top honours at the Cinque Mulini in February – a performance which lifted his club Bikila Toledo to third for that year's European Cross Country Club Championships, which was held in conjunction with the race. He carried the hopes of the host nation at the 2011 IAAF World Cross Country Championships in Punta Umbría and was the first European to finish, taking 16th place. He won the 2011 Cursa Bombers, although it was a Catalan-only race and his winning time was relatively slow. He missed the track season due to injury and returned in November, coming seventh at the Cross de Atapuerca then second at the Soria race. At the 2011 European Cross Country Championships he was again the runner-up, this time to Atelaw Yeshetela. He was the top European at the Cross de Venta de Baños later that month, coming second to Kenya's Philemon Kimeli. A third place at the San Silvestre Vallecana closed his 2011 season.

Lamdassem returned to the Edinburgh Cross Country in 2012 and won the long race, beating European champion Yeshetela. He won the European Club's Cross Country meet in Castellón, leading Bikila Toledo to the title. He debuted over the marathon distance at the Lake Biwa Marathon but finished 23rd with a relatively slow time of 2:14:39 hours. Returning to shorter distances, he came second to Kenenisa Bekele at the Great Ireland Run and won the Cursa Bombers in April. In June he was a silver medallist at the European Cup 10000m and placed sixth in the event at the 2012 European Athletics Championships. He was selected to run the event for Spain at the 2012 London Olympics, but did not perform as well, coming in 23rd place in 28:49.85 minutes. In his first half marathon in eight years, he came seventh at the Great Scottish Run. A better outing came at the Great South Run 10-miler, where he was runner-up, and near the end of the year he came sixth at the 2012 European Cross Country Championships.

At the start of the 2013 cross country season he made the top two at the Great Edinburgh race and the European Clubs competition.

== Achievements ==
Year	Competition	Venue	Position	Event	Notes
Representing Spain
2008	Olympic Games	Beijing, China	24th	10,000 m	28:13.73
2009	World Championships	Berlin, Germany	–	10,000 m	DNF
2010	Ibero-American Championships	San Fernando, Spain	1st	5000 m	13:32.48
2010	European Championships	Barcelona, Spain	4th	10,000 m	28:34.89
2010	European Cross Country Championships	Albufeira, Portugal	2nd	10 km cross	29:18
2011	World Cross Country Championship	Punta Umbría, Spain	16th	12 km cross	35:12
2012	European Championships	Helsinki, Finland	6th	10.000 m	28:26.46
2012	Olympic Games	London, United Kingdom	23rd	10,000 m	28:49.85
2013	World Championships	Moscow, Russia	–	Marathon	DNF
2014	World Half Marathon Championships	Copenhagen, Denmark	17th	Half marathon	1:01:22
2015	European Cross Country Championships	Hyères, France	4th	10 km cross	29:57
2016	World Half Marathon Championships	Cardiff, United Kingdom	18th	Half Marathon	1:03:29
2016	European Championships	Amsterdam, Netherlands	12th	Half marathon	1:04:13
2017	World Championships	London, United Kingdom	–	Marathon	DNF
2017	European Cross Country Championships	Šamorín, Slovakia	10th	10 km cross	30:18
2018	World Half Marathon Championships	Valencia, Spain	28th	Half marathon	1:02:14
2018	Mediterranean Games	Tarragona, Spain	–	Half marathon	DNF
2019	World Cross Country Championships	Aarhus, Denmark	66th	10 km cross	34:42
2020	World Half Marathon Championships	Gdynia, Poland	31st	Half marathon	1:01:21
2021	Olympic Games	Sapporo, Japan	5th	Marathon	2:10:16
2022	European Championships	Munich, Germany	6th	Marathon	2:10:52
2023	World Championships	Budapest, Hungary	22nd	Marathon	2:12:59
