= Athletics at the 2001 Summer Universiade – Men's 10,000 metres =

The men's 10,000 metres event at the 2001 Summer Universiade was held in Beijing, China on 28 August.

== Results ==
Rank	Athlete	Nationality	Time	Notes
1st place, gold medalist(s)	John Kanyi	Kenya	28:27.42	
2nd place, silver medalist(s)	Ignacio Cáceres	Spain	28:43.63	
3rd place, bronze medalist(s)	Kazuyoshi Tokumoto	Japan	28:47.34	
4	Ryuichi Hashinokuchi	Japan	29:43.42	
5	Cho Keun-Hyung	South Korea	30:08.36	
6	Michael Aish	New Zealand	30:13.11	
7	Nicholas Mugomeri	Zimbabwe	30:15.78	
8	Joshua Chelimo	Uganda	30:16.66	
9	Dmytro Baranovskyy	Ukraine	30:24.79	
10	Jonnatan Morales	Mexico	30:42.92	
11	Koen Raymaekers	Netherlands	30:59.75	
12	Donatien Buzingo	Burundi	31:01.38	
13	Matthew Downin	United States	31:08.21	
14	Thabalethu Phaku	South Africa	31:15.65	
15	Brandon Leslie	United States	33:57.39	
	Saïd Ali-Hadji	Algeria	DNF	
	Jaganath Bista	Nepal	DNF	
