= 1997 European 10,000m Challenge =

1997 European 10,000m Cup
- Organisers: EAA
- Edition: 1st
- Date: 5 April
- Host city: (Spain) Barakaldo
- Events: 2
- Participation: 56 athletes from 14 nations

The 1997 European 10,000m Cup, was the 1st edition of the European 10,000m Cup (the original name in 1997 was European 10,000m Challenge) and took place on 5 April in Barakaldo, Spain.

== Individual ==
=== Men ===
Rank	Athlete	Country	Time
1st place, gold medalist(s)	Dieter Baumann	Germany	27.21.53
2nd place, silver medalist(s)	Domingos Castro	Portugal	27:34.77
3rd place, bronze medalist(s)	Kamiel Maase	Netherlands	27:35.72
4	Karsten Eich	Germany	27:41.94
5	José Ramos	Portugal	28.08.83
6	Rob Denmark	United Kingdom	28.09.10
7	Vítor Almeida	Portugal	28.09.91
8	Jose Manuel Martinez	Spain	28.11.67
9	Vincenzo Modica	Italy	28:12.74
10	Alfredo Bras	Portugal	28.13.10

=== Women ===
Rank	Athlete	Country	Time
1st place, gold medalist(s)	Julia Vaquero	Spain	31:14.51
2nd place, silver medalist(s)	Marina Bastos	Portugal	32.09.95
3rd place, bronze medalist(s)	Petra Wassiluk	Germany	32:10.94
4	Zahia Dahmani	France	32:27.60
5	Ana Correia	Portugal	32:35.01
6	Chantal Dellenbach	France	32:42.99
7	Rkia Chebili	France	32:47.38
8	Teresa Nunes	Portugal	32:49.96
9	Fatima Silva	Portugal	32:52.85
10	Helena Javornik	Slovenia	33.02.79

== Team ==
In italic the participants whose result did not go into the team's total time, but awarded with medals.

Men
Rank	Nation	Time	Total time
1st place, gold medalist(s)	Portugal; Domingos Castro; José Ramos; Vítor Almeida; Alfredo Bras; José Santos	27:34.77; 28:08.83; 28:09.91 (28:13.10) (29:00.43)	1:23:53.51
2nd place, silver medalist(s)	Italy; Vincenzo Modica; Simone Zanon; Antonio Armuzzi; Domenico D'Ambrosio	28:12.74; 28:15.29; 28:33.18 (29:02.93)	1:25:01.21
3rd place, bronze medalist(s)	Spain; José M. Martínez; Julio Rey; Teodoro Cuñado; Xavier Caballero; José Carlos Adán	28:11.67; 28:41.34; 29:01.79 (29:04.71) (DNF)	1:25:54.80
4	United Kingdom		1:26:48.43
5	Finland		1:27:04.15

Women
Rank	Nation	Time	Total time
1st place, gold medalist(s)	Portugal; Marina Bastos; Ana Correia; Teresa Nunes; Fatima Silva; Ana Paula Oliveira	32:09.95; 32:35.01; 32:49.96 (32:52.85) (DNF)	1:37:34.92
2nd place, silver medalist(s)	France; Zahia Dahmani; Chantal Dallenbach; Rkia Chebili; Nicole Leveque; Chryssie Girard	32:27.60; 32:42.99; 32:47.38 (33:15.20) (35:00.41)	1:37:56.37
3rd place, bronze medalist(s)	Spain; Julia Vaquero; Beatriz Santiago; María Luisa Larraga; Teresa Recio; Rocío Rios	31:14.51; 33:44.25; 34:07.55 (DNF) (DNF)	1:39:06.31
