= Athletics at the 1997 Summer Universiade – Men's 5000 metres =

The men's 5000 metres event at the 1997 Summer Universiade was held at the Stadio Cibali in Catania, Italy on 26 and 28 August.

== Medalists ==
Gold	Silver	Bronze
Simone Zanon; Italy	Thorsten Naumann; Germany	Dan Browne; United States

== Results ==
=== Heats ===
Rank	Heat	Athlete	Nationality	Time	Notes
1	2	Tamás Kliszek	Hungary	13:57.49	Q
2	2	Gabino Apolonio	Mexico	13:58.13	Q
3	2	Stephen Isbel	Australia	13:58.89	Q
4	2	Stathis Stasi	Cyprus	13:59.50	Q
5	2	Thorsten Naumann	Germany	14:01.40	Q
6	2	John Maitai Mboroth	Kenya	14:03.87	q
7	2	Naoki Mishiro	Japan	??:??.??	q
8	2	Richie Boulet	United States	14:09.70	q
9	2	Marílson Gomes dos Santos	Brazil	14:09.87	q
10	1	Dan Browne	United States	14:12.16	Q
11	1	Karl Keska	Great Britain	14:12.60	Q
12	1	Simone Zanon	Italy	14:12.66	Q
13	2	Øyvind Fretheim	Norway	14:17.17	q
14	1	Alexei Scutaru	Moldova	14:18.63	Q
15	1	Abderrahim Maarouf	Morocco	14:19.60	Q
16	2	Adamou Aboubakar	Cameroon	14:20.45	
17	1	Trent Harlow	Australia	14:24.61	
18	2	Şükrü Onat	Turkey	14:30.73	
19	1	Raúl Ramírez	Mexico	14:31.46	
20	1	Wataru Kobayashi	Japan	14:33.93	
21	2	Dragoslav Prpa	Yugoslavia	14:35.28	
22	1	Jan Erik Christiansen	Norway	14:41.45	
23	2	Juma Nkuwi	Tanzania	14:47.33	
24	1	Mathew Koskei	Kenya	14:49.37	
25	2	Anwalu Baray	Nigeria	14:50.90	
26	1	Iván Sánchez	Spain	14:53.60	
27	2	Fidele Baregensabe	Burundi	14:55.82	
28	2	Ian Grime	Great Britain	15:01.57	
29	1	Mehmet Kara	Turkey	15:11.06	
30	1	Bruno Gumyubumwe	Burundi	15:36.91	
31	1	Kelekae Poloko	Botswana	15:40.22	
32	1	Alfadio Traoré	Guinea	16:34.53	

=== Final ===
Rank	Athlete	Nationality	Time	Notes
1st place, gold medalist(s)	Simone Zanon	Italy	13:57.54	
2nd place, silver medalist(s)	Thorsten Naumann	Germany	13:58.35	
3rd place, bronze medalist(s)	Dan Browne	United States	14:00.94	
4	Naoki Mishiro	Japan	14:01.90	
5	John Maitai Mboroth	Kenya	14:04.57	
6	Gabino Apolonio	Mexico	14:05.64	
7	Stephen Isbel	Australia	14:06.71	
8	Karl Keska	Great Britain	14:09.40	
9	Tamás Kliszek	Hungary	14:11.68	
10	Stathis Stasi	Cyprus	14:14.30	
11	Alexei Scutaru	Moldova	14:15.72	
12	Marílson Gomes dos Santos	Brazil	14:16.48	
13	Øyvind Fretheim	Norway	14:27.40	
14	Richie Boulet	United States	14:31.43	
15	Abderrahim Maarouf	Morocco	14:39.91	
