= Valeria Straneo =

Italian long-distance runner (born 1976)

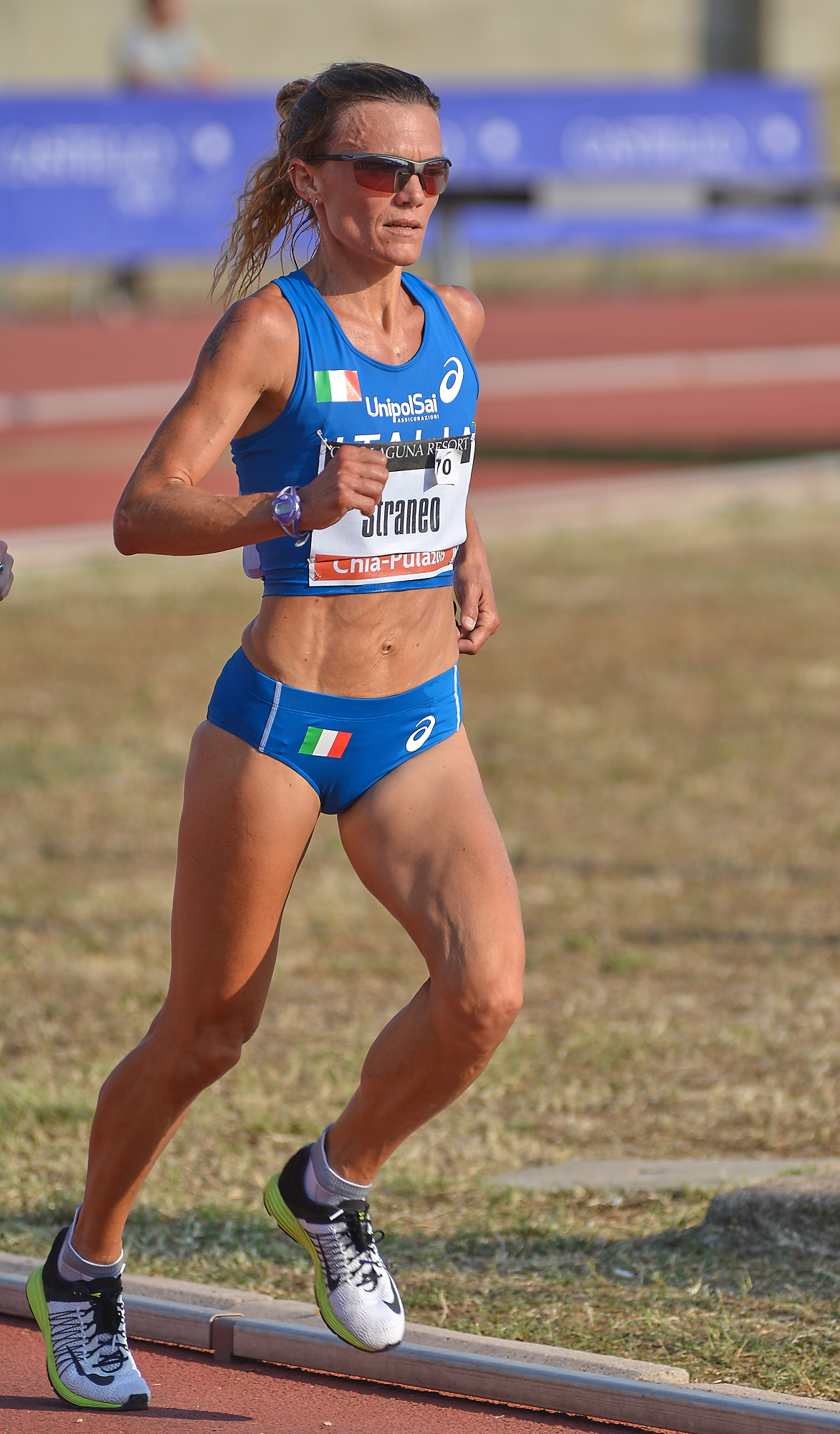
- Straneo competing at 2015 European 10,000m Cup

Personal information
- Nationality: Italian
- Born: 5 April 1976 (age 50) Alessandria, Italy
- Height: 1.68 m (5 ft 6 in)
- Weight: 44 kg (97 lb)

Sport
- Country: Italy
- Sport: Athletics
- Event: Long distance running
- Club: Runner Team 99; Laguna Running
- Coached by: Beatrice Brossa

Achievements and titles
- Personal bests: 10,000 m: 32:35.12 (2011); Half marathon: 1:07:46 (2012); Marathon: 2:23:45 (2012)
Medal record
Event	1st	2nd	3rd
World Championships	0	1	0
European Championships	0	1	0
Mediterranean Games	1	0	0
European 10,000m Cup	0	1	0
Total	1	3	0
World Championships
Silver medal – second place	2013 Moscow	Marathon
European Championships
Silver medal – second place	2014 Zürich	Marathon
Mediterranean Games
Gold medal – first place	2013 Mersin	Half marathon

Valeria Straneo (born 5 April 1976) is an Italian long-distance runner, winner of the silver medal at the 2013 World Championships in Athletics and Italian record holder in the marathon.

She won the Stramilano in 2011 and bettered the half marathon Italian record at the Roma-Ostia Half Marathon in 2012, although it was not ratified as the course doesn't meet Fidal criteria.

== Biography ==
Born in Alessandria, it was only after the removal of her spleen, in 2010, that she began to reach a national standard of running. At 35 years old, she ranked eighth in the 2011 Berlin Marathon with a time of 2:26:33 hours. This met the qualifying standard for the 2012 Olympic Games, but three other athletes had run faster than her (Anna Incerti, Rosaria Console and Nadia Ejjafini). However, she broke the 12-year-old Italian record at the Rotterdam Marathon in April, finishing as runner-up with a time of 2:23:44 hours. The Turin Marathon saw her finish third with a time of 2:27:04 hours.

Straneo has represented the Italy national athletics team once (at the 2011 European Cross Country Championships) and has won twice at the national championships. She has two children, Leonardo (born 2006) and Arianna (born 2007).

== National records ==
- Half marathon: 1:07:46 ( (Italy) Ostia, 26 February 2012) - Current holder.
- Marathon: 2:23:44 ( (Netherlands) Rotterdam, 15 April 2012) - Current holder.

== Achievements ==
Year	Competition	Venue	Result	Event	Time	Notes
2011	European Cross Country Championships	(Slovenia) Velenje	10th	Cross country running	26:42	
2012	Olympic Games	(United Kingdom) London	8th	Marathon	2:25:27	Changed to 7th after disqualification of Tetyana Hamera-Shmyrko
2013	Mediterranean Games	(Turkey) Mersin	1st	Half Marathon	1:11:00	
2013	World Championships in Athletics	(Russia) Moscow	2nd	Marathon	2:25:58	
2014	European Championships in Athletics	(Switzerland) Zurich	2nd	Marathon	2:25:27	
2016	Olympic Games	(Brazil) Rio de Janeiro	13th	Marathon	2:29:44	

== Road races ==
- 1st - 2011 Stramilano
- 2nd - 2012 Rotterdam Marathon

== National titles ==
Straneo won eight national championships at individual senior level, she has won, at 36 years old for her first time, the individual national championship.

- Italian Athletics Championships
  - 10,000 metres: 2013, 2020 (2)
  - Half marathon: 2012, 2014, 2018, 2020 (4)
- Italian 10 km road Championship
  - 10 km road race: 2011, 2012 (2)

== See also ==
- Italian records in athletics
- Italian all-time lists - Half marathon
- Italian all-time lists - Marathon
