= 2000 European 10,000m Challenge =

2000 European 10,000m Cup
- Organisers: EAA
- Edition: 4th
- Date: 1 April
- Host city: (Spain) Lisbon
- Events: 2

The 2000 European 10,000m Cup, was the 4th edition of the European 10,000m Cup (the original name in 2000 was European 10,000m Challenge) and took place on 1 April in Lisbon, Portugal.

== Individual ==
=== Men ===
Rank	Athlete	Country	Time
1st place, gold medalist(s)	Enrique Molina	Spain	27:59.80
2nd place, silver medalist(s)	Karl Keska	United Kingdom	28:00.56
3rd place, bronze medalist(s)	Alberto García	Spain	28:01.11

=== Women ===
Rank	Athlete	Country	Time
1st place, gold medalist(s)	Fatima Yvelain	France	31:43.29
2nd place, silver medalist(s)	Gunhild Haugen	Norway	31:47.89
3rd place, bronze medalist(s)	Agata Balsamo	Italy	31:56.56

== Team ==
In italic the participants whose result did not go into the team's total time, but awarded with medals.

=== Men ===
Rank	Country	Time
1st place, gold medalist(s)	Spain	1:24:06.77
2nd place, silver medalist(s)	Portugal	1:24:16.38
3rd place, bronze medalist(s)	United Kingdom	1:24:40.32

=== Women ===
Rank	Country	Time
1st place, gold medalist(s)	Portugal	1:36:43.78
2nd place, silver medalist(s)	Norway	1:37:14.73
3rd place, bronze medalist(s)	Spain	1:37:24.41
