= 2001 European 10,000m Challenge =

2001 European 10,000m Cup
- Organisers: EAA
- Edition: 5th
- Date: 7 April
- Host city: (Spain) Barakaldo
- Events: 2

The 2001 European 10,000m Cup, was the 5th edition of the European 10,000m Cup (the original name in 2001 was European 10,000m Challenge) and took place on 7 April in Barakaldo, Spain.

== Individual ==
=== Men ===
Rank	Athlete	Country	Time
1st place, gold medalist(s)	José Ríos	Spain	27:49.35
2nd place, silver medalist(s)	Hélder Ornelas	Portugal	28:01.94
3rd place, bronze medalist(s)	Kamiel Maase	Netherlands	28:02.37

=== Women ===
Rank	Athlete	Country	Time
1st place, gold medalist(s)	Paula Radcliffe	United Kingdom	30:55.80
2nd place, silver medalist(s)	Irina Mikitenko	Germany	31:29.55
3rd place, bronze medalist(s)	Mónica Rosa	Portugal	32:22.25

== Team ==
In italic the participants whose result did not go into the team's total time, but awarded with medals.

=== Men ===
Rank	Country	Time
1st place, gold medalist(s)	Spain	1:24:32.03
2nd place, silver medalist(s)	Portugal	1:26:16.19
3rd place, bronze medalist(s)	United Kingdom	1:26:27.61

=== Women ===
Rank	Country	Time
1st place, gold medalist(s)	Spain	1:37:41.97
2nd place, silver medalist(s)	United Kingdom	1:38:41.17
3rd place, bronze medalist(s)	Portugal	1:39:00.62
