= Rafael Iglesias (athlete) =

Spanish long-distance runner

Rafael Iglesias (born 5 July 1979) is a Spanish long-distance runner who specialises in marathon running.

== Achievements ==
Year	Competition	Venue	Position	Event	Notes
Representing Spain
2001	European U23 Championships	Amsterdam, Netherlands	13th	10,000m	31:41.39
2009	World Championships	Berlin, Germany	–	Marathon	DNF
2010	European Championships	Barcelona, Spain	6th	Marathon	2:20:14
2011	European 10,000m Cup	Oslo, Norway	4th	10,000m	28:41.61
2011	World Championships	Daegu, South Korea	26th	Marathon	2:17:45
