= 1998 European 10,000m Challenge =

1998 European 10,000m Cup
- Organisers: EAA
- Edition: 2nd
- Date: 4 April
- Host city: (Portugal) Lisbon
- Events: 2

The 1998 European 10,000m Cup was the 2nd edition of the European 10,000m Cup (the original name in 1998 was European 10,000m Challenge) and took place on 5 April in Lisbon, Portugal.

== Individual ==
=== Men ===
Rank	Athlete	Country	Time
1st place, gold medalist(s)	Fabián Roncero	Spain	27:14.44
2nd place, silver medalist(s)	António Pinto	Portugal	27:15.76
3rd place, bronze medalist(s)	Dieter Baumann	Germany	27:32.31

=== Women ===
Rank	Athlete	Country	Time
1st place, gold medalist(s)	Fernanda Ribeiro	Portugal	30:48.06
2nd place, silver medalist(s)	Paula Radcliffe	United Kingdom	30:48.58
3rd place, bronze medalist(s)	Marina Bastos	Portugal	32:20.51

== Team ==
In italic the participants whose result did not go into the team's total time, but awarded with medals.

=== Men ===
Rank	Country	Time
1st place, gold medalist(s)	Portugal	1:22:46.26
2nd place, silver medalist(s)	Spain	1:22:48.95
3rd place, bronze medalist(s)	Germany	1:23:48.95

=== Women ===
Rank	Country	Time
1st place, gold medalist(s)	Portugal	1:35:29.45
2nd place, silver medalist(s)	United Kingdom	1:36:57.33
3rd place, bronze medalist(s)	Spain	1:38:08.22
