= Ricardo Serrano (runner) =

Spanish long-distance runner

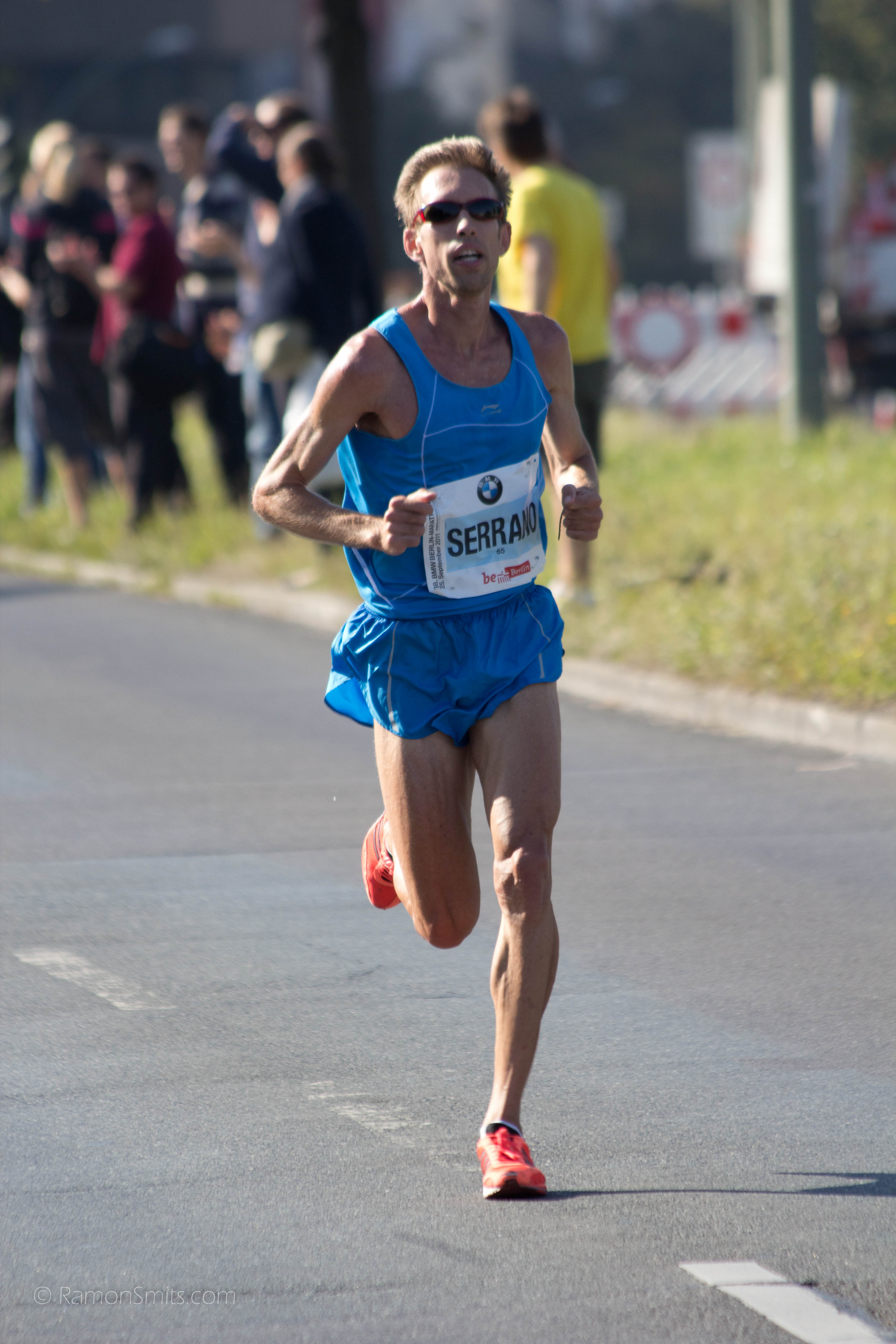
Ricardo Serrano at the Berlin Marathon 2011

Ricardo Serrano (born 29 October 1980) is a Spanish long-distance runner who specializes in the 10,000 metres.

At the 2004 IAAF World Cross Country Championships he finished in 33rd place. Two years later, he managed only 65th place at the competition. He was the silver medallist at the 2006 European Cup 10000m in Antalya. He finished ninth over 10,000 m at the 2006 European Championships. He also competed at the 2007 World Road Running Championships. He did not compete much over the following seasons, but marked a return to international competition at the 2010 European Cross Country Championships and helped Spain to the team bronze medals. At the 2011 IAAF World Cross Country Championships he was 89th overall. His marathon debut followed later that year and he was sixth at the 2011 Berlin Marathon with a time of 2:13.32 hours. He again shared in the team bronze with Spain at the 2011 European Cross Country Championships.

At the 2012 European Clubs Cross Country he managed third place and led his club, Otsu Colibri Guadalajara, to second in the team rankings.

== Personal bests ==
- 3000 metres - 7:57.06 min (2005)
- 5000 metres - 13:37.47 min (2007)
- 10,000 metres - 28:19.20 min (2005)
- Half marathon - 1:02:09 min (2007)
- Marathon - 2:13.32 hrs (2011)
