= José Rocha =

Portuguese long-distance runner (born 1976)

Medal record

Men's athletics

Representing Portugal

European Cross Country Championships
Bronze medal – third place	2011 Velenje	Senior race

Ibero-American Championships
Bronze medal – third place	2006 Ponce	5000 m

José Rocha (born 6 July 1976) is a Portuguese long-distance runner who competes in track, cross country running and half marathons. He was third at the 2009 European Cup 10000m and was the bronze medallist at the 2011 European Cross Country Championships. He also won a bronze medal at the 2006 Ibero-American Championships. He has a 5000 metres best of 13:47.78 minutes and a 10,000 metres best of 28:15.44 minutes.

== Career ==
A member of the Maratona Clube de Portugal, Rocha made his global-level debut at the age of 28 at the 2005 IAAF World Cross Country Championships, although he managed only 115th place in the men's short race. The following year he won the bronze medal over 5000 metres at the 2006 Ibero-American Championships in Athletics. He dipped under 14 minutes for the event in Gijón in July, setting a personal best of 13:51.06 minutes. In October he ran for his club at the European Club's Half Marathon Championship and came seventh in a time of 1:04:31 hours. At the Portugal Half Marathon in Lisbon, Rocha managed sixth place in a Portuguese and Kenyan field.

Rocha secured his first national title in 2007, winning the 5000 m at the Portuguese Championships. He came tenth at the Portugal Half Marathon, being the second European to finish just behind Stefano Baldini. Following this he reached third place at the European Club's Half Marathon race. With an eighth-place finish at the Oeiras Cross Country he gained selection for the 2007 European Cross Country Championships, where he went on to finish in 24th place and win a team silver medal alongside Rui Silva.

He opened 2008 on grass, placing 13th in the European Club's Cross Country Championships then making his long race debut at the 2008 IAAF World Cross Country Championships, coming 100th overall. He ran a 5000 m career best of 13:47.78 minutes in Lugano and was eighth at that year European Club's Half Marathon. He improved hs international ranking at the 2009 IAAF World Cross Country Championships, finishing in 45th and leading the Portuguese men to 12th in the rankings (the second best European team after Spain). Running on home turf, he took the bronze medal over 10,000 metres at the European Cup race with a personal best time of 28:15.44 minutes. A sixth-place finish at the Saint Denis Half Marathon saw him set another personal best of 1:03:19 hours. He won the national trial race at the Torres Vedras International Cross Country in November. He led the national team at the 2009 European Cross Country Championships, having a career best finish of sixth place to help Portugal to fifth in the team rankings. He capped of his year with a runner-up finish at the Sao Silvestre do Porto 10K.

He failed to finish at the 2010 IAAF World Cross Country Championships, but had greater success on the track: he was runner-up at the 5000 m national championships, came ninth at the European Cup 10000m and made his first appearance at the 2010 European Athletics Championships, where he came 19th. He improved his half marathon best to 1:03:16 hours with a fifth-place finish at the European Club's race, but did not run well at the 2010 European Cross Country Championships held in Albufeira, ending up in 40th while his teammates shared in the team silver medal. The following year he came fifth at the Almond Blossom Cross Country, then went on to take 40th place at the 2011 IAAF World Cross Country Championships. Rocha did not manage to finish the European Cup 10,000 m race. At the age of 35, he won his first continental cross country medal. He battled with Ayad Lamdassem in the final stages of the 2011 European Cross Country Championships and ended the race in third to take the individual bronze medal.
