= María Dolores Pulido =

Spanish long-distance runner (born 1974)

Personal information
- Nationality: Spanish
- Born: 1 October 1974 (age 51)

Sport
- Sport: Long-distance running
- Event: Marathon

María Dolores Pulido (born 1 October 1974) is a Spanish long-distance runner. She competed in the women's marathon at the 2004 Summer Olympics. She also won the Logroňo Medio Maratón de La Rioja in 2013.

== Career ==
Personal Bests
Length	Time	Location	Date	Indoor or Outdoor
1500 Metres	4:27.27	Sevilla, Spain	24 July 1999	Outdoor
3000 Metres	9:33.89	Sevilla, Spain	4 June 2005	Outdoor
5000 Metres	16:19.08	Sevilla, Spain	5 June 2004	Outdoor
10,000 Metres	33:08.75	Barakaldo, Spain	2 April 2005	Outdoor
10 Kilometres	35:24	Grao de Castellón, Spain	31 March 2012	Outdoor
Half Marathon	1:10:27	Azpeitia, Spain	28 March 2004	Outdoor
Marathon	2:36:44	Padova, Italy	25 April 2004	Outdoor
800 Metres	2:15.19	Sevilla, Spain	20 February 1999	Indoor
1500 Metres	4:31.33	Sevilla, Spain	8 February 2000	Indoor
3000 Metres	9:14.99	Valencia, Spain	24 February 2001	Indoor
