= Ana Dulce Félix =

Portuguese long-distance runner (born 1982)

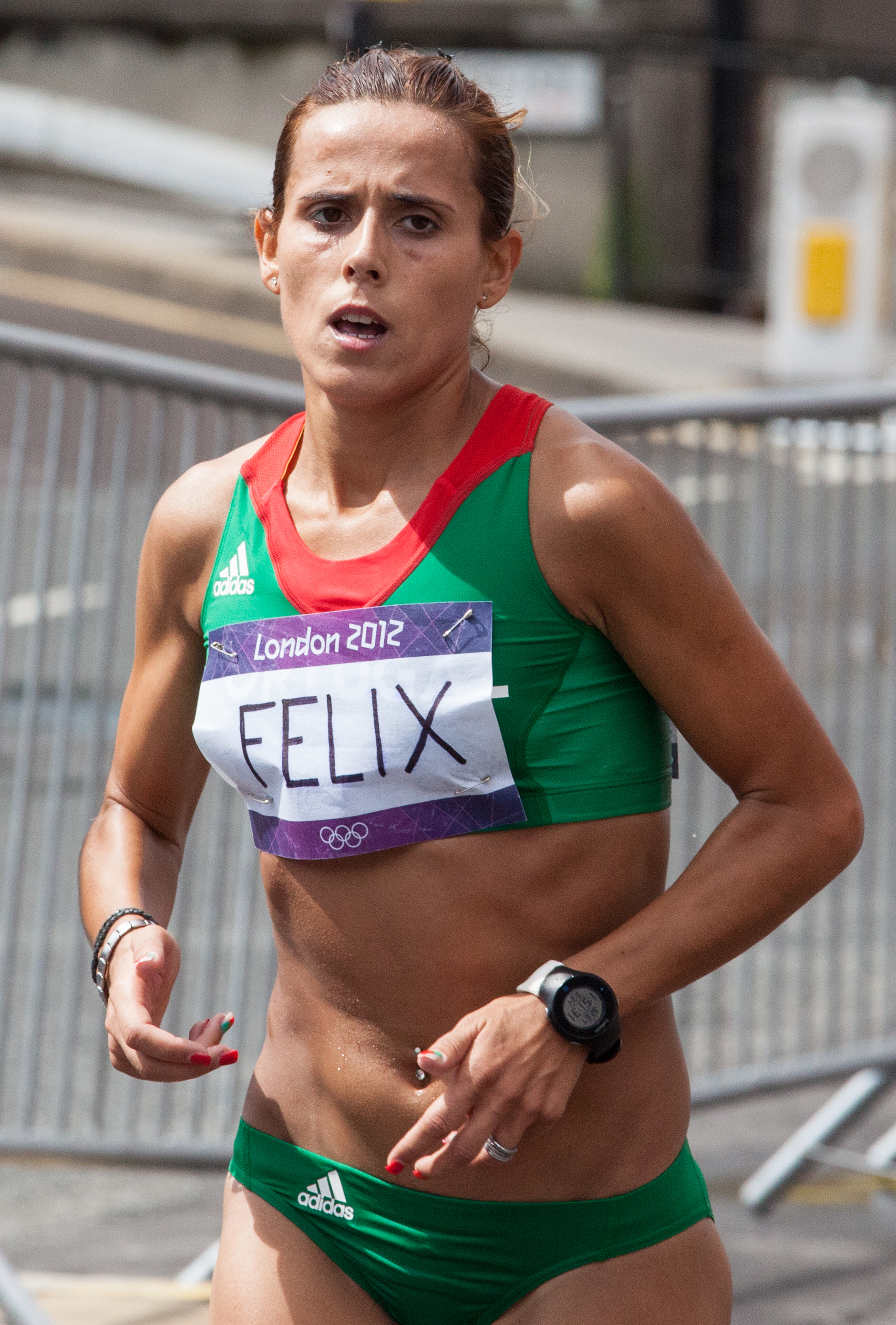
- Félix running the 2012 Olympic marathon

Personal information
- Full name: Ana Dulce Ferreira Félix
- Born: 23 October 1982 (age 43) Guimarães Municipality, Portugal
- Height: 1.65 m (5 ft 5 in)
- Weight: 52 kg (115 lb)

Sport
- Country: Portugal
- Sport: Athletics
- Event: Marathon
- Club: Benfica
- Coached by: Ricardo Ribas
Medal record
Representing Portugal
World Cross Country Championships
Bronze medal – third place	2009 Amman	Team
European Athletics Championships
Gold medal – first place	2012 Helsinki	10,000 m
Silver medal – second place	2016 Amsterdam	10,000 m
European Cross Country Championships
Gold medal – first place	2008 Brussels	Team
Gold medal – first place	2009 Dublin	Team
Gold medal – first place	2010 Albufeira	Team
Silver medal – second place	2011 Velenje	Individual
Silver medal – second place	2011 Velenje	Team
Silver medal – second place	2012 Szentendre	Individual
Bronze medal – third place	2010 Albufeira	Individual
Bronze medal – third place	2013 Belgrade	Individual

Ana Dulce Ferreira Félix ComM (born 23 October 1982) is a Portuguese long-distance runner who competes in track, cross country, and road running events. She ran the Olympic marathon in 2012 and 2016 and placed 21st and 16th, respectively.

== Career ==
Born in Azurém, Guimarães Municipality, Félix began her career as a junior at the 2000 and 2001 IAAF World Cross Country Championships, although she did not break the top 60 runners on either occasion. She finished 31st at the 2001 European Cross Country Championships.

She was disheartened by her performances at international level and doubted whether she could be a runner of a professional standard. She began working in a low-paid job at a clothes factory but still trained despite the long hours and tiring nature of the work. Another Portuguese runner, Jessica Augusto, urged her quit the job and to focus full-time on her running. She followed the advice and had some success on the national stage in 2007, winning the 10,000 metres Portuguese title. Félix began to establish herself on the international athletics scene the following year: she finished 72nd at the 2008 IAAF World Cross Country Championships, but had a much better outing at the 2008 IAAF World Half Marathon Championships where she finished 13th (the second fastest European-born runner after Luminița Talpoș).

The 2009 season proved to be a significant progression in her career. At the 2009 IAAF World Cross Country Championships she finished in 15th place to lead the Portuguese women to a team bronze medal. Félix won the Great Ireland Run in April, setting a personal best of 32:18 over the 10 km distance. She won the Göteborgsvarvet half marathon that May and won a bronze medal at the European Cup 10,000m the following month. After a fifth-place finish in the 5000 metres at the 2009 European Team Championships, she was entered into the 10,000 metres at the 2009 World Championships in Athletics. In the event final she ran a then personal best of 31:30.90 for 13th place. After this she enjoyed a successful run of road and cross country competitions: she was third at the Great North Run and second at both the Portugal Half Marathon (setting a half marathon best of 1:10:44) and the Great South Run.

After wins at the Warandeloop and Lotto Cross Cup meeting in West Flanders, she ran at the 2009 European Cross Country Championships and although she finished sixth, she helped the Portuguese women top the team rankings. She closed the year with wins at the São Silvestre de Lisboa and São Silvestre da Amadora 10 km road races. In 2010, she was third at the Cinque Mulini and became the Portuguese cross country champion at the Almond Blossom Cross Country. She also won the national short course competition as well as the 1500 metres and 3000 metres national club titles. She did not manage to help the women's team for a second time at the 2010 IAAF World Cross Country Championships as she pulled out of the competition.

She represented Portugal over 10,000 m at the 2010 European Athletics Championships, but she faded in the second half of the race and finished in ninth place. She ran at the Great North Run in September, but again missed out on the top spot, finishing as runner-up behind Berhane Adere. The 2010 European Cross Country Championships were held in Portugal in December and she reached the podium, taking the bronze medal. She also won a team gold alongside the event winner Jessica Augusto.

She led Maratona Clube de Portugal to second in the team rankings at the 2011 European Cross Country Club Championships, hosted at the Cinque Mulini. She was the runner-up in the individual race, just ahead of her club mate Sara Moreira. At the Lisbon Half Marathon in March, she broke the Portuguese record in the half marathon with at time of 1:08:33 hours. She also stated her intention to go one further and focus on bettering Rosa Mota's marathon record. She ran a time of 2:26:30 hours for her debut at the Vienna City Marathon, finishing a few seconds behind the winner Fate Tola. A meet record came at the Austrian Women's Run 5K, where she was almost half a minute ahead of runner-up Augusto.

Félix was the top European performer in the 10,000 m at the 2011 World Championships in Athletics, where she came eighth. She came close to the podium at the 2011 New York City Marathon, taking fourth with a personal best of 2:25:40 hours. She led the Portuguese team at the 2011 European Cross Country Championships and won silver medals both individually and in the national team. At the start of 2012 she managed only seventh at the Lisbon Half Marathon, but came third at the Göteborgsvarvet in May. She then went on to win the women's 10,000 m event at the European championship.

Félix represents Benfica since 21 August 2013. On 12 January 2014, Félix won the Portuguese Road Women's Championship again, repeating her achievement of 2013. On 2 March 2014, she won her fifth consecutive title in Portuguese long race cross country, a unique achievement in the women's event. On 11 January 2015, she won the Portuguese Road Women's Championship, for the third time in a row.

Félix set her current personal best in 10,000 metres at 31:19.03 at the European Athletics Championships in Amsterdam.

== Personal bests ==
Surface	Event	Time (h:min:s)	Venue	Date
Track	1500 m (indoor)	4:14.96	Pombal, Portugal	13 February 2010
Track	3000 m (indoor)	8:56.84	Pombal, Portugal	14 February 2010
Track	5000 m	15:08.02	Stockholm, Sweden	31 July 2009
Track	10,000 m	31:19.03	Amsterdam, Netherlands	6 July 2016
Road	5 km	15:31	Vienna, Austria	3 June 2012
Road	10 km	32:16	Lisbon, Portugal	27 December 2014
Road	15 km	49:15	Lisbon, Portugal	13 January 2013
Road	20 km	1:06:16	Gothenburg, Sweden	12 May 2012
Road	Half marathon	1:08:33 NR	Lisbon, Portugal	20 March 2011
Road	25 km	1:25:26	New York City, United States	6 November 2011
Road	30 km	1:42:19	New York City, United States	6 November 2011
Road	Marathon	2:25:15	London, United Kingdom	26 April 2015

- All information (except 5 km) taken from IAAF profile.
