= Patrizia Tisi =

Italian long-distance runner

Personal information
- Nationality: Italian
- Born: 17 May 1971 (age 55)

Sport
- Country: Italy
- Sport: Athletics
- Event: Long-distance running

Achievements and titles
- Personal best: Half marathon: 1:12:12 (2006)

Patrizia Tisi (born 17 May 1971) is a former Italian female long-distance runner who competed at four editions of the IAAF World Cross Country Championships at senior level (2001, 2002, 2003, 2004). and two of the IAAF World Half Marathon Championships (2001, 2004).

== Biography ==
She won four national championships at senior level (half marathon: 2004, cross country running: 2003, 2004, 2005).
