= Ignacio Cáceres =

Spanish long-distance runner

Personal information
- Born: June 18, 1976 (age 50) Barcelona, Spain
- Height: 1.65 m (5 ft 5 in)
- Weight: 53 kg (117 lb)

Sport
- Country: Spain
- Sport: Athletics
- Events: Long-distance running Marathon
Medal record
Representing Spain
Summer Universiade
Silver medal – second place	2001 Beijing	10,000m

Ignacio Cáceres Llorca (born 18 June 1976) is a Spanish long-distance runner who specializes in the 10,000 metres, half marathon and marathon. He lives in L'Estartit, Girona, Spain

He was the silver medallist in the 10,000 m at the 2001 Summer Universiade and the following year he finished twelfth in the event at the 2002 European Championships. He was selected for the marathon team at the 2010 European Athletics Championships, but failed to finish the race.

He set a personal best at the 2012 Rotterdam Marathon, taking ninth place in a time of 2:11:58 hours. Also in 2012, he competed in the marathon at the Olympic Games, finishing in 31st place.

== International competitions ==
Year	Competition	Venue	Position	Notes
Representing Spain
2001	Summer Universiade	Beijing, China	2nd	10,000 m
2012	Summer Olympics	London, Great Britain	31st	Marathon

== Personal bests ==
- 3000 metres - 7:57.58 min (2004)
- 5000 metres - 13:25.11 min (2004)
- 10,000 metres - 28:19.42 min (2002)
- Half marathon - 1:02:47 hrs (2007)
- Marathon - 2:11:58 hrs (2012)
