= Jamel Chatbi =

Moroccan steeplechase runner

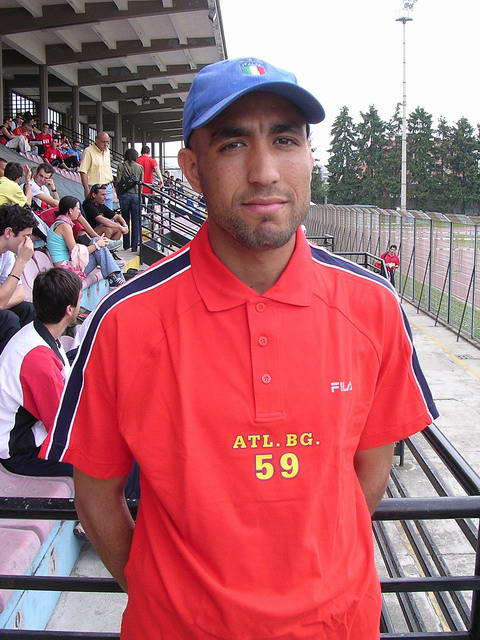

Personal information
- Nationality: Italian
- Born: 30 April 1984 (age 42) Beni Amir Est, Morocco

Sport
- Country: Italy
- Sport: Athletics
- Event: 3000 metres steeplechase
- Club: Atletica Riccardi

Achievements and titles
- Personal best: 3000 m st: 8:08.86 (2009)
Medal record
Senior level (individual)
Event	1st	2nd	3rd
Mediterranean Games	1	0	0
European 10,000m Cup	0	0	2
Total	1	0	2
Representing Morocco
Mediterranean Games
Gold medal – first place	2009 Pescara	3000 m st.

Jamel Chatbi (born 30 April 1984) is a Moroccan-born athlete who specialises in the 3000 metres steeplechase and competes for Italy.

Chatbi has been banned twice from competition during his career for doping violations.

== Career ==
Chatbi began competing in 2006 and finished third in the Tutta Dritta 10km that year. He ran a new steeplechase best at the Mondo Keien Meeting in Uden, Netherlands, setting a new stadium record of 8:29.13.

He ran in the Campaccio cross country race and finished in eighth place. Chatbi attended the 2008 IAAF World Cross Country Championships, his first major event, and finished in 30th place, helping Morocco to fifth in the team rankings along with Abdellah Falil. He took part in the 2008 Parelloop race in Brunssum and finished in eleventh place with a new 10 km best of 28:33 minutes.

He improved significantly in 2009 and won his first major medal by setting a Games record and personal best of 8:13.11 for the gold in the steeplechase at the 2009 Mediterranean Games. At the 2009 World Championships in Athletics, he qualified for the final after finishing second in his heat behind eventual gold medallist Ezekiel Kemboi. However, he withdrew from the final after failing a mandatory drugs test, testing positive for clenbuterol. He was the first person to test positive at the championships.

== Doping bans ==
Chatbi received a three-year ban from competitive athletics lasting from 18 August 2009 until 17 September 2012. Chatbi received a second ban lasting eight years from 2016 to 2024 for whereabouts and biological passport infringements.

== See also ==
- List of doping cases in athletics
