= Dmitry Maksimov (runner) =

Russian long-distance runner

Dmitry Aleksandrovich Maksimov (Russian: Дмитрий Александрович Максимов; born 6 May 1977) is a Russian long-distance runner.

He finished sixth in the 10,000m final at the 2006 European Athletics Championships in Gothenburg.

He also competed in the same event at the 2000 Olympics, but did not qualify from his heat.
