= Ricardo Ribas =

Portuguese long-distance runner

Personal information
- Born: 8 October 1977 (age 48)

Sport
- Sport: Track and field
- Event: Marathon

Ricardo Ribas (born 8 October 1977) is a Portuguese long-distance runner who specialises in the marathon. He competed in the men's marathon event at the 2016 Summer Olympics.
