= Inês Monteiro =

Portuguese athlete (born 1980)

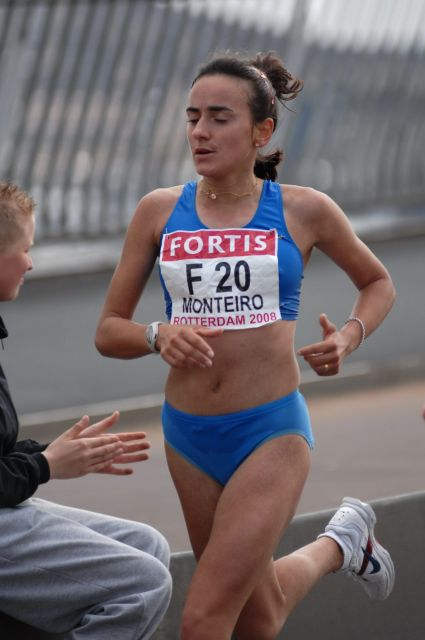
- Monteiro competing in the 2008 Rotterdam Marathon

Medal record

Women's athletics

Representing Portugal

European Team Championships
Gold medal – first place	2009 Leiria	3000 m

Inês Alexandra das Neves Monteiro (born 18 May 1980) is a Portuguese athlete who competes in middle and long-distance track running, as well as road running and cross country. She started out as a cross country runner, winning a silver and a gold medal at the 1998 and 1999 European junior race. She has represented Portugal at the 2004 and 2008 Summer Olympics, and has competed twice at the World Championships in Athletics. She is a regular performer at the IAAF World Cross Country Championships, generally finishing around 30th place.

Monteiro made her marathon debut in 2008 and finished fifth at the Rotterdam Marathon. She is the most successful athlete at the Cidade de Ovar Half Marathon, having won the competition six times. She represents Maratona Clube de Portugal in club competitions.

== Career ==
=== Early career ===
Born in Ramela, Guarda, Portugal, Inês Monteiro first experienced success in professional athletics at cross country competitions: she won the silver medal in the junior race at the 1998 European Cross Country Championships and took the gold the following year. On the world stage, she reached the 5000 metres final at the 1998 World Junior Championships in Athletics and competed in the junior race at the 1998 IAAF World Cross Country Championships. She improved her position for the 1999 edition in Ireland, finishing in thirteenth.

=== Senior competitions ===
She progressed to senior races in 2000, competing in the short race at the World Cross Country Championships and winning the Cidade de Ovar Half Marathon in 1:12:24. She finished seventh at the 2001 European Cross Country Championships but she won a gold medal as part of the best performing team. Track running became her focus in 2002, but she failed to make the 3000 metres final at the 2002 European Athletics Indoor Championships and finishing in 12th in the 5000 m final at the 2002 European Athletics Championships. However, she guided her team at the 2002 European Cross Country Championships to a silver team medal. At the World Student Games that year she managed to win bronze in the cross country. A second win at the Ovar Half Marathon in October was soon followed by a win in Azambuja which made her the 15 km national champion.

She did not break into the top thirty at either the 2002 or 2003 World Cross Country Championships. She represented Portugal at the Olympics for the first time at the 2004 Athens Games. Running in the 5000 metres, she performed poorly and finished 18th with 16:03.75 – fifty seconds slower than her best that season. After finishing just outside the top 25 runners at the 2005 World Cross Country Championships, she experimented with a switch to the steeplechase. She finished in 13th place in the 3000 m steeplechase at the 2005 World Championships in Athletics. The next two years saw her career stall: after a poor 64th-place finish in the World Cross Country Championships she ran infrequently and only returned to competition in mid-2007.

=== Beijing Olympics and improving times ===
Monteiro showed much improvement in the 2008 season. She ran her fastest ever time at the World Cross Country Championships (27:12) and took fifth place at the Rotterdam Marathon – her first competitive outing over the distance. She qualified to represent Portugal at the 2008 Beijing Olympics but she did not manage to finish the Olympic marathon race. She closed the year on a positive note, however, winning the Ovar Half Marathon for a fourth time, and taking individual bronze and team gold at the 2008 European Cross Country Championships. She closed the season by beating Olympic silver medallist Eunice Jepkorir to win the Cross Internacional de Venta de Baños.

She became the national cross country champion in March 2009, but failed to finish at the World Championships in Amman. She performed strongly at the European track events, winning the 10,000 m cup with a personal best and taking the 3000 m bronze medal in the European Team Championships. Prior to the World Athletics Championships she improved her 5000 m best at the Bislett Games in Oslo. She finished in tenth place in the 10,000 metres final at the 2009 World Championships in Athletics. Her new personal best time of 31:25.67 was the best performance by a European in the race. Following the World Championships, she took to road competitions: she won the Great South Run in a Portuguese 10-mile record time, and she took the Ovar Half Marathon title for a sixth time with a personal best of 1:10:06. At the start of the 2009–10 cross country season, she beat national champion Jessica Augusto to win the Oeiras International Cross Country for the first time, and took second behind Linet Masai, the reigning 10,000 m World Champion, at the Cross Internacional de Soria the following week.

In May 2010, Monteiro set a new personal best of 32:02 in the 10K road distance, coming third at the Great Manchester Run, and then set another best of 31:13.58 in June to retain her title at the European Cup 10000m, leading Portugal to a team victory.

== Personal bests ==
Surface	Event	Time (h:m:s)	Venue	Date
Track	1500 m	4:13.76	Seixal, Portugal	25 July 2009
Track	One mile	4:41.39	Leiria, Portugal	24 April 1999
Track	3000 m	8:52.47	Monaco	19 July 2002
Track	3000 m steeplechase	9:39.20	Athens, Greece	14 June 2005
Track	5000 m	15:01.06	Oslo, Norway	3 July 2009
Track	10,000 m	31:13.67	Marseilha, France	5 June 2010
Road	10 km	32:04+	Portsmouth. England	25 October 2009
Road	15 km	48:40+	Portsmouth. England	25 October 2009
Road	10 miles	52:32 NR	Portsmouth. England	25 October 2009
Road	20 km	1:09:14	Almeirim, Portugal	20 October 2005
Road	Half marathon	1:10:06	Ovar, Portugal	5 October 2009
Road	Marathon	2:30:36	Rotterdam, Netherlands	13 April 2008

- All information taken from IAAF profile.
