= Ana Dias (runner) =

Portuguese long-distance runner

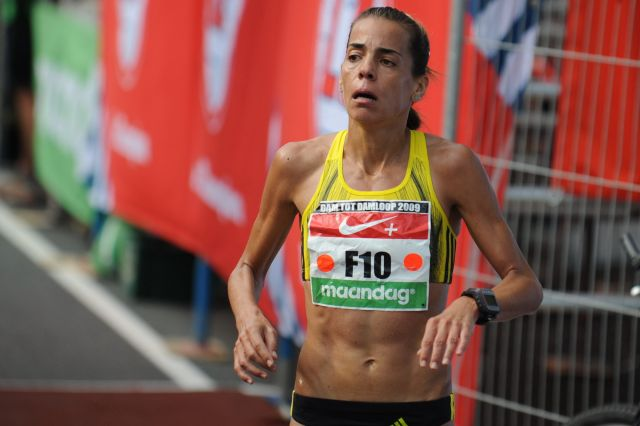

Personal information
- Full name: Ana Maria Guerreiro Dias
- Nationality: Portuguese
- Born: 15 January 1974 (age 52) Faro, Algarve, Portugal
- Height: 1.65 m (5 ft 5 in)
- Weight: 52 kg (115 lb)

Sport
- Sport: Athletics
- Event: Long-distance running
- Club: Provo da Conceição de Faro

Achievements and titles
- Personal bests: 5000 m: 15:26.41 (2001); 10,000 m: 31:39.52 (1999); Half-marathon: 1:10:28 (2003); Marathon: 2:28:49 (2003)
Medal record
Representing Portugal
Summer Universiade
Silver medal – second place	1999 Palma de Mallorca	5000m

Ana Maria Guerreiro Dias (born 15 January 1974) is a Portuguese long-distance and marathon runner. She is a four-time Olympian, and a multiple-time national record holder for the long-distance running (5000 metres, 10,000 metres, half-marathon, and marathon). She also set a personal best time of 2:28:49, by finishing fourth in the women's race at the 2003 Berlin Marathon.

== Athletic career ==
At the age of twenty-two, Dias made her official debut for the 1996 Summer Olympics in Atlanta, where she competed in the first ever women's 5000 metres. She finished the race in eleventh place on the second heat of the competition by nearly a second behind Denmark's Nina Christensen, with a time of 15:57.35. Dias repeated her same fate in the long-distance running at the 2000 Summer Olympics in Sydney, when she placed twelfth this time in the preliminary heats of the women's 10,000 metres, posting her time at 33:21.69.

Following her poor performance and narrow misses in the long-distance running, Dias began her full transition of becoming a marathon runner. In 2003, she reached her breakthrough season by finishing fourth in the women's race at the Berlin Marathon, with her best career time of 2:28:49, twenty-one seconds behind Italy's Ornella Ferrara. Having attained an Olympic A-standard time, Dias earned her spot on the Portuguese track and field team for the Olympics.

At the 2004 Summer Olympics in Athens, Dias placed sixty-second out of eighty-two qualified runners, including Great Britain's Paula Radcliffe in the women's marathon, outside her personal best time of 2:28.:49. The following year, she displayed a better performance with a thirty-second-place finish in the same event at the IAAF World Championships in Helsinki, Finland, posting her time at 2:36:50.

Twelve years after competing in her first Olympics, Dias qualified for her fourth Portuguese team, as a 34-year-old, at the 2008 Summer Olympics in Beijing, by attaining an A-standard time of 2:29:22 from the Seville Marathon. She successfully finished the race in forty-sixth place by less than a second behind Spain's Yesenia Centeno, with a time of 2:36:25.

In 2009, Dias achieved her best career result in the long-distance running, when she finished fourth in the women's 10,000 metres at the European Cup in Ribeira Brava, Madeira, clocking at 31:42.94. Three years later, Dias sought to qualify for her fifth Olympics in London, with a higher chance of competing at the 2012 European Championships in Helsinki, Finland. She placed seventh in the 10,000 metres, but failed to attain an A-standard time of 31:45.00.

== Personal bests ==
Event	Performance	Location	Date
5000 metres	15:26.41	Lisbon	22 July 2001
10,000 metres	31:39.52	Barakaldo	10 April 1999
Half-marathon	1:10:28	Oruña de Piélagos	6 September 2003
Marathon	2:28:49	Berlin	September 28, 2003

- All information taken from IAAF profile.
