= Carles Castillejo =

Spanish long-distance runner

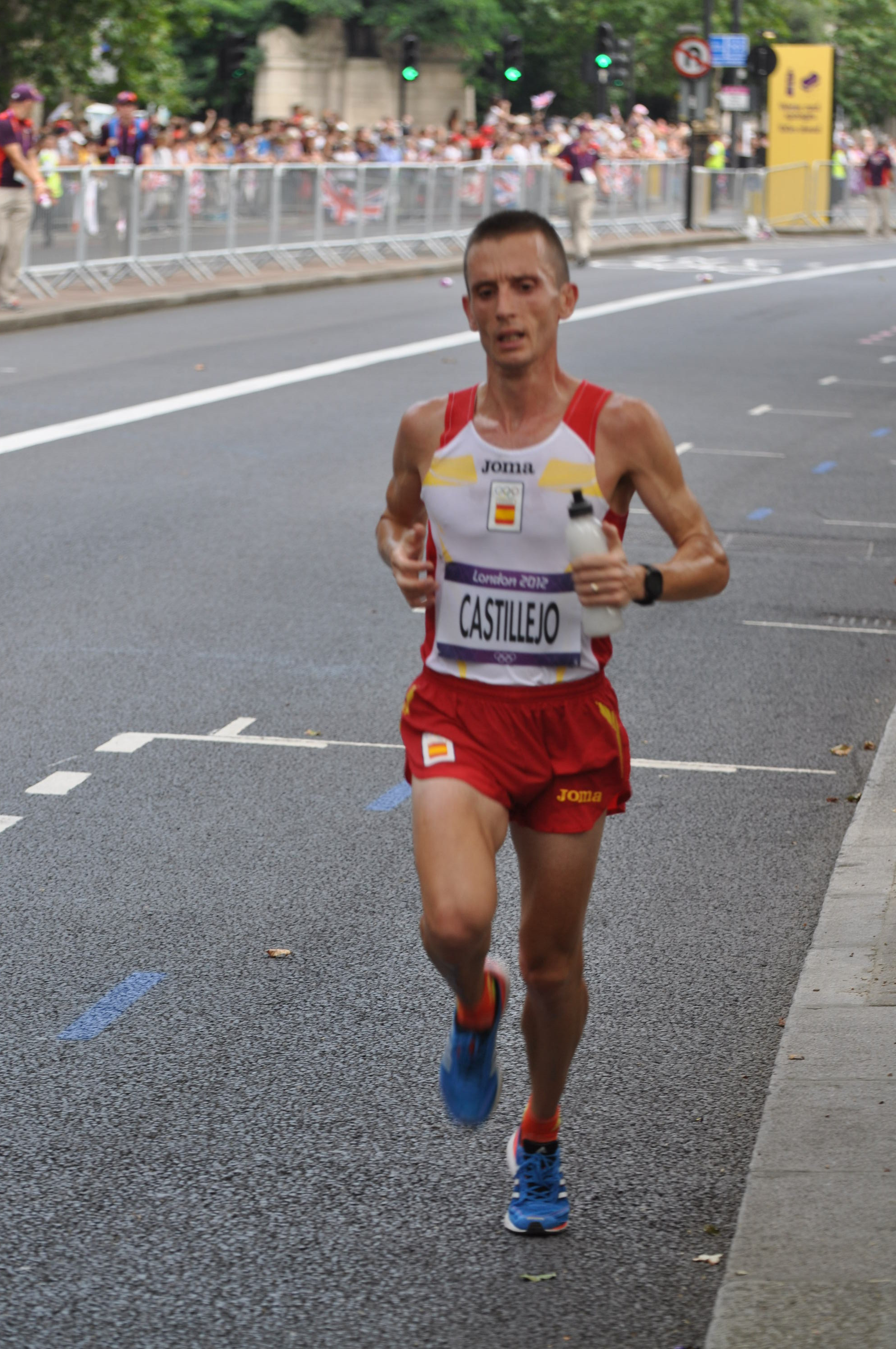
- Castillejo in the marathon at the 2012 Olympics in London

Personal information
- Born: August 18, 1978 (age 47)
- Height: 1.71 m (5 ft 7 1/2 in)
- Weight: 60 kg (130 lb)

Sport
- Country: Spain
- Sport: Athletics
- Event: Marathon

Carles Castillejo Salvador (born August 18, 1978, in Barcelona) is a Spanish long distance runner. He has won Spanish national titles in the 5000 m, the 10,000 m and the marathon. He has represented Spain at the Olympics on four occasions (2004, 2008, 2012 and 2016).

== Biography ==
He made his first international appearances for Spain in 2004. He ran in the long race at the 2004 IAAF World Cross Country Championships and finished in 57th place. He had greater success on the track: he won the national title over 5000 metres and was a close second to Hudson de Souza over 3000 metres at the 2004 Ibero-American Championships in Athletics. His Olympic debut followed at the 2004 Athens Olympics, but he was eliminated in the heats of the 5000 m.

In 2005, he improved to 26th place in the World Cross Country long race. He also ran a 10,000 metres personal best of 28:06.88 minutes to take second place at the European Cup 10000m. The following year he ranked 29th at the World Cross Country and helped Spain to the team silver medals at the 2006 European Cross Country Championships with a tenth-place finish. He continued to perform well at the European Cup 10000m, taking the bronze in 2007 and silver in 2008. After running a personal best of 27:39.79 minutes in Vigo, he ran in the event at the 2008 Beijing Olympics and managed 23rd place overall. He had a career best finish of 26th at the 2009 IAAF World Cross Country Championships, then went on to claim the silver medal over 5000 m at the 2009 European Team Championships. His best performance on the world stage followed, as he came 15th in the 10,000 m at the 2009 World Championships in Athletics.

The highlight of his 2010 season was a fifth-place finish in the 10,000 m at the European Championships. Castillejo made his debut over the marathon distance in 2011 at the national championship race held at the Maratón Ciudad de Castellón. He won the race with a time of 2:10:02 hours – a performance which guaranteed him selection for the 2012 Summer Olympics. He defeated Patrick Makau (the marathon world record holder) at the 2012 Granollers Half Marathon in February, where he performed well in near-freezing conditions. At the 2012 Summer Olympics, he finished in 24th place.

In Río Olympics 2016 he finished 49th with a time of 2h18m34s, his last marathon as a professional.

== Achievements ==
Year	Competition	Venue	Position	Event	Notes
Representing Spain
2003	Universiade	Daegu, South Korea	4th	5000 m	13:57.20
2004	Ibero-American Championships	Huelva, Spain	2nd	3000 m	7:51.26
2004	Olympic Games	Athens, Greece	31st (h)	5000 m	13:49.16
2005	Mediterranean Games	Almería, Spain	2nd	10,000 m	29:13.91
2005	Universiade	İzmir, Turkey	4th	5000 m	13:46.74
2005	Universiade	İzmir, Turkey	6th	10,000 m	29:23.93
2008	Olympic Games	Beijing, China	23rd	10,000 m	28:13.68
2009	European Team Championships	Leiria, Portugal	2nd	5000 m	13:49.54
2009	World Championships	Berlin, Germany	15th	10,000 m	28:09.89
2010	European Championships	Barcelona, Spain	5th	10,000 m	28:49.69
2012	European Championships	Helsinki, Finland	5th	10,000 m	28:24.51
2012	Olympic Games	London, United Kingdom	24th	Marathon	2:16:17
2015	World Championships	Beijing, China	—	Marathon	DNF
2016	European Championships	Amsterdam, Netherlands	8th	Half marathon	1:03:52
2016	Olympic Games	Rio de Janeiro, Brazil	49th	Marathon	2:18:34
