= Christelle Daunay =

French long distance runner

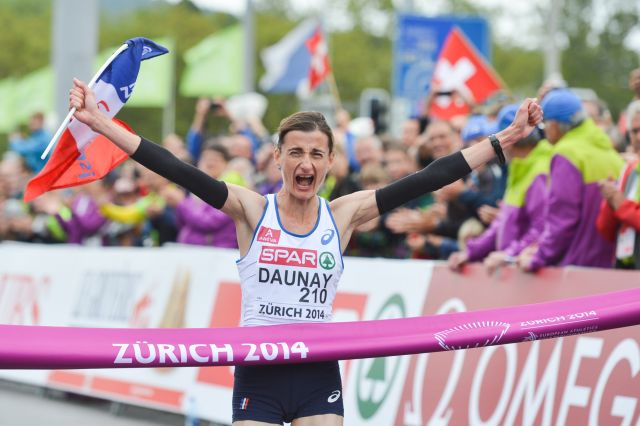
- Daunay in 2014

Personal information
- Born: 5 December 1974 (age 51) Le Mans, Sarthe, France
- Height: 162 cm (5 ft 4 in)
- Weight: 45 kg (99 lb)
Medal record
Women's athletics
Representing France
European Championships
Gold medal – first place	2014 Zürich	Marathon

Christelle Daunay (born 5 December 1974 in Le Mans, Sarthe) is a French long-distance runner who specialises in road running. She is the current French marathon record holder. She represented France at the 2008 Summer Olympics and has competed a number of times in the IAAF World Half Marathon Championships. She has had top-three finishes in the New York Marathon, Paris Marathon and the Course Paris-Versailles

== Biography ==
Christelle Daunay started athletics at the age of 11. She ran track races between 3000 metres and 10,000 metres, cross country competitions, the half marathon and marathon.

Since 2005 she has been affiliated to the SCO Sainte-Marguerite (Marseille) ("Sports and Cultural Society of Sainte-Marguerite (Marseille)"). In February 2006 she put her career as a physiotherapist on hold in order to prepare full-time for the 2008 Olympics in Beijing.

With her time of 2 hours 28 minutes and 24 seconds on 27 January 2008 at the Osaka Ladies Marathon (10th place), she not only beat the previous French record established by Chantal Dällenbach, but also qualified for the marathon in the 2008 Olympics. This was her second major marathon, her first being the Paris Marathon in 2007 where she came third with a time of 2:28:54.

She came in 20th in the women's marathon at the 2008 Olympic Games, with a time of 2:31:48.

She came third in the 2009 Paris Marathon setting a new French national record of 2:25:43, beating her previous record time set in 2008. In 2009 Daunay entered in her first New York Marathon. She came third with a time of 2:29:16. She further improved her French record at the 2010 Paris Marathon, in which she ran a time of 2:24:22 for second place.

She was the runner-up at the Great Manchester Run in May 2011, finishing behind the home-favourite Helen Clitheroe. A month later she took the silver medal at the European Cup 10000m, just missing the French record with a personal best run of 31:44.84 minutes for the distance. She ran at the Great Ireland Run in 2012 and came third. She was third at the European Cup 10000m and set a new French record for the distance with her time of 31:35.81 minutes. She was ten seconds off the 10K French road record at the Corrida de Langueux later that month, where time of 31:48 minutes was a course record. She missed the rest of the 2012 season.

Daunay began 2013 win 10K wins in Nice and Marseille and placed 35th at the 2013 IAAF World Cross Country Championships. She entered the Manchester Run and came third despite a fall early on.

== Achievements ==
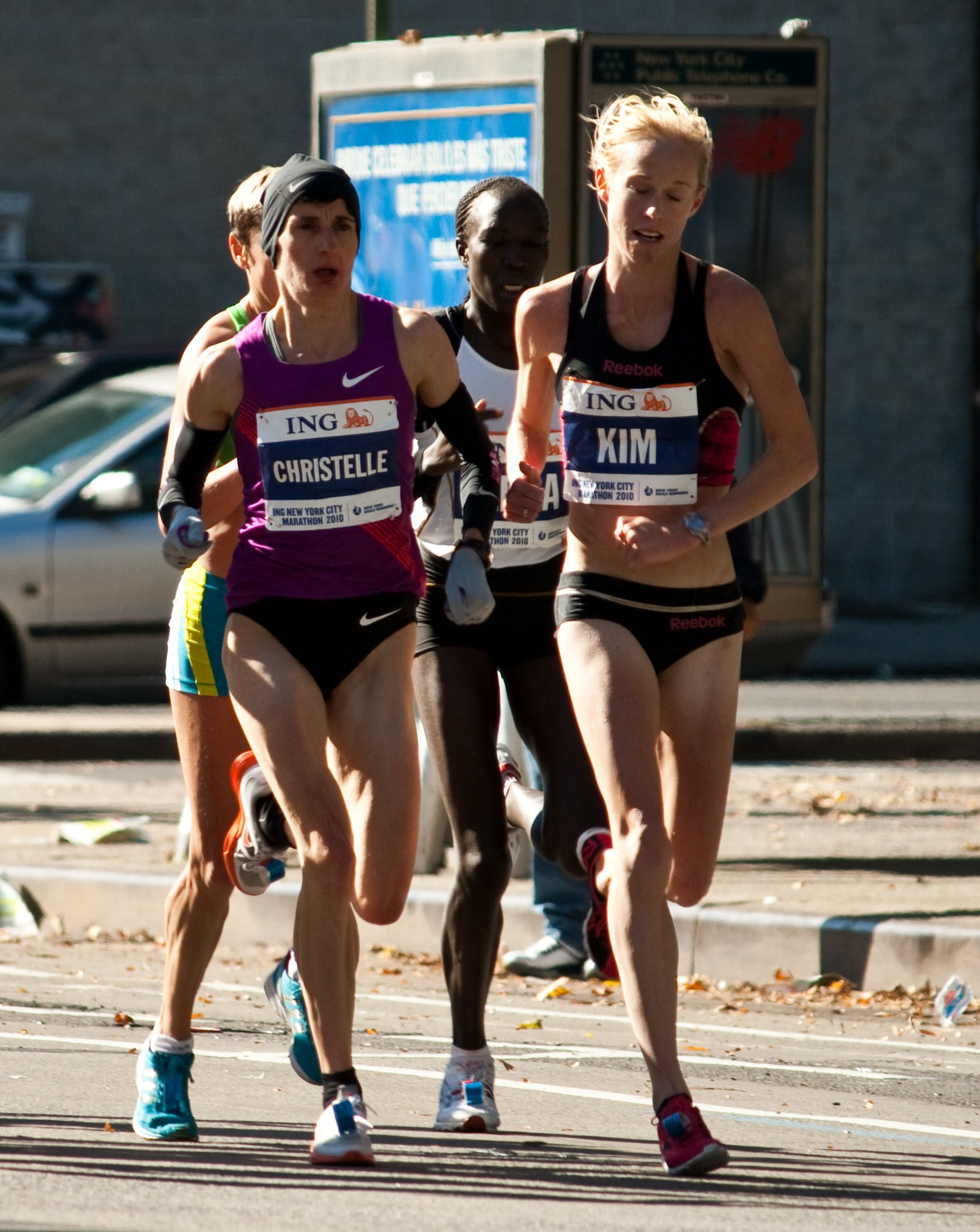
Daunay (left) next to Kim Smith at the 2010 New York City Marathon

=== Olympics ===
- 2008 Olympic Games at Peking - 20th place

=== Road races ===
- 2013 New York City Marathon - 4th place
- 2009 New York City Marathon - 3rd place
- 2009 Paris Marathon - 3rd place
- 2010 Paris Marathon - 2nd place
- 2008 Osaka Marathon - 10th place
- 2007 Paris Marathon - 3rd place
- Prom'classic de Nice (10 km race) - 1st in 2007, 2008
- 10 km de la Corrège - 1st in 2007
- Paris-Versailles, course de 16.3 km - 2nd in 2007

=== National titles ===
- Cross country - 2007, 2009
- 10,000 m - 2006, 2008, 2009
- 5000 m - 2003, 2004
- Half marathon - 2004

== Personal bests ==
- Marathon : 2:24:22 (NR, 11 April 2010)
- Half marathon : 1:08:34 (NR, 17 October 2010)
- 10 km on road : 31:59 (15 May 2011) Manchester
- 10,000 m : 31:35.81 (NR, 3 June 2012) Bilbao
- 5000 m : 15:24.48 (30 May 2010) Hengelo
- 3000 m : 9:02.16 (18 June 2011) Stockholm
