= European 10,000m Cup =

International athletics competition

The European 10,000m Cup is an annual 10,000 metres race for European athletes which was first held in 1997. The competition is organised by the European Athletics Association and first began as the European 10000 Metres Challenge (European 10,000m Challenge till 2005 edition), after the event was removed from the European Cup programme.

== Background ==
The competition has roots in the Iberian 10,000 metres Championships – a competition between Spanish and Portuguese athletes that was held between 1991 and 1996 – and the first five editions of the European 10000 Metres Challenge were held in the Iberian Peninsula. The event was first held under its current title in 2005. From 2018, the event was held as the climax of the Night of 10k PB's event at Parliament Hill, London before moving to Pacé in France in 2022.

== Editions ==
Edition	Year	Host city	Host country	Date	No. of athletes
1st	1997	Barakaldo	Spain	5 April	
2nd	1998	Lisbon	Portugal	4 April	
3rd	1999	Barakaldo	Spain	10 April	
4th	2000	Lisbon	Portugal	1 April	
5th	2001	Barakaldo	Spain	7 April	
6th	2002	Camaiore	Italy	6 April	
7th	2003	Athens	Greece	12 April	
8th	2004	Maribor	Slovenia	3 April	
9th	2005	Barakaldo	Spain	2 April	
10th	2006	Antalya	Turkey	15 April	
11th	2007	Ferrara	Italy	7 April	
12th	2008	Istanbul	Turkey	12 April	
13th	2009	Ribeira Brava	Portugal	6 June	
14th	2010	Marseille	France	5 June	
15th	2011	Oslo	Norway	4 June	45 men, 33 women
16th	2012	Bilbao	Spain	3 June	46 men, 41 women
17th	2013	Pravets	Bulgaria	8 June	31 men, 30 women
18th	2014	Skopje	Republic of Macedonia	7 June	43 men, 41 women
19th	2015	Cagliari	Italy	6 June	41 men, 36 women
20th	2016	Mersin	Turkey	5 June	25 men, 23 women
21st	2017	Minsk	Belarus	10 June	33 men, 40 women
22nd	2018	London	United Kingdom	19 May	
23rd	2019	London	United Kingdom	6 July	
–	2020	Postponed until 2021 due to the COVID-19 pandemic.			
24th	2021	Birmingham	United Kingdom	5 June	
25th	2022	Pacé	France	28 May	
26th	2023	Pacé	France	3 June	
27th	2025	Pacé	France	24 May	33 men, 37 women
28th	2026	La Spezia	Italy	23 May	51 men, 53 women
29th	2027	TBA		22 May	

== Champions ==
Year	Men		Women	
Year	Individual	Team	Individual	Team
1997	Dieter Baumann (GER)	Portugal	Julia Vaquero (ESP)	Portugal
1998	Fabián Roncero (ESP)	Portugal	Fernanda Ribeiro (POR)	Portugal
1999	Alberto García (ESP)	Spain	Paula Radcliffe (GBR)	Portugal
2000	Enrique Molina (ESP)	Spain	Fatima Yvelain (FRA)	Portugal
2001	José Ríos (ESP)	Spain	Paula Radcliffe (GBR)	Spain
2002	Dieter Baumann (GER)	Italy	Mihaela Botezan (ROM)	Portugal
2003	Ismaïl Sghyr (FRA)	Portugal	Fernanda Ribeiro (POR)	Portugal
2004	José Manuel Martínez (ESP)	Spain	Margaret Maury (FRA)	France
2005	Juan Carlos de la Ossa (ESP)	Spain	Sabrina Mockenhaupt (GER)	Portugal
2006	Mokhtar Benhari (FRA)	France	Elvan Abeylegesse (TUR)	Belgium
2007	André Pollmächer (GER)	Spain	Elvan Abeylegesse (TUR)	Spain
2008	Selim Bayrak (TUR)	Russia	Elvan Abeylegesse (TUR)	Belarus
2009	José Manuel Martínez (ESP)	Portugal	Inês Monteiro (POR)	Portugal
2010	Mo Farah (GBR)	France	Inês Monteiro (POR)	Portugal
2011	Yousef el Kalai (POR)	Spain	Sara Moreira (POR)	Italy
2012	Polat Arıkan (TUR)	Spain	Sara Moreira (POR)	Great Britain
2013	Sergio Sánchez (ESP)	Italy	Sabrina Mockenhaupt (GER)	Spain
2014	Polat Arıkan (TUR)	Turkey	Clémence Calvin (FRA)	Portugal
2015	Polat Arıkan (TUR)	Italy	Trihas Gebre (ESP)	Great Britain
2016	Daniele Meucci (ITA)	Italy	Esma Aydemir (TUR)	Great Britain
2017	Antonio Abadía (ESP)	Spain	Sara Moreira (POR)	Belarus
2018	Richard Ringer (GER)	Spain	Lonah Chemtai Salpeter (ISR)	Great Britain
2019	Yemaneberhan Crippa (ITA)	Italy	Stephanie Twell (GBR)	Great Britain
2021	Morhad Amdouni (FRA)	France	Eilish McColgan (GBR)	Great Britain
2022	Jimmy Gressier (FRA)	France	Yasemin Can (TUR)	Germany
2023	Yemaneberhan Crippa (ITA)	Israel	Alina Reh (GER)	Germany
2025	Efrem Gidey (IRL)	France	Jana Van Lent (BEL)	Belgium

== Records ==
The competition record for men is 27:14.44, set in 1998 by Fabián Roncero from Spain. The competition record for women is 30:21.67, set in 2006 by Elvan Abeylegesse from Turkey.

== Medal table (1997-2022) ==
Rank	Nation	Gold	Silver	Bronze	Total
1	Spain (ESP)	24	26	19	69
2	Portugal (POR)	21	19	15	55
3	France (FRA)	12	4	5	21
4	Great Britain (GBR)	11	11	12	34
5	Turkey (TUR)	10	7	3	20
6	Italy (ITA)	8	12	15	35
7	Germany (GER)	7	6	9	22
8	Belarus (BLR)	3	1	2	6
9	Romania (ROU)	1	3	0	4
10	Israel (ISR)	1	2	0	3
11	Russia (RUS)	1	1	3	5
12	Belgium (BEL)	1	1	1	3
13	Norway (NOR)	0	2	0	2
14	Netherlands (NED)	0	1	4	5
14	Ukraine (UKR)	0	1	4	5
16	Serbia (SRB)	0	1	1	2
17	Austria (AUT)	0	1	0	1
17	Greece (GRE)	0	1	0	1
19	Hungary (HUN)	0	0	1	1
19	Poland (POL)	0	0	1	1
Totals (20 entries)		100	100	95	295
