= 2026 European Athletics Championships – Women's marathon team =

Women's marathon team at the 2026 European Athletics Championships
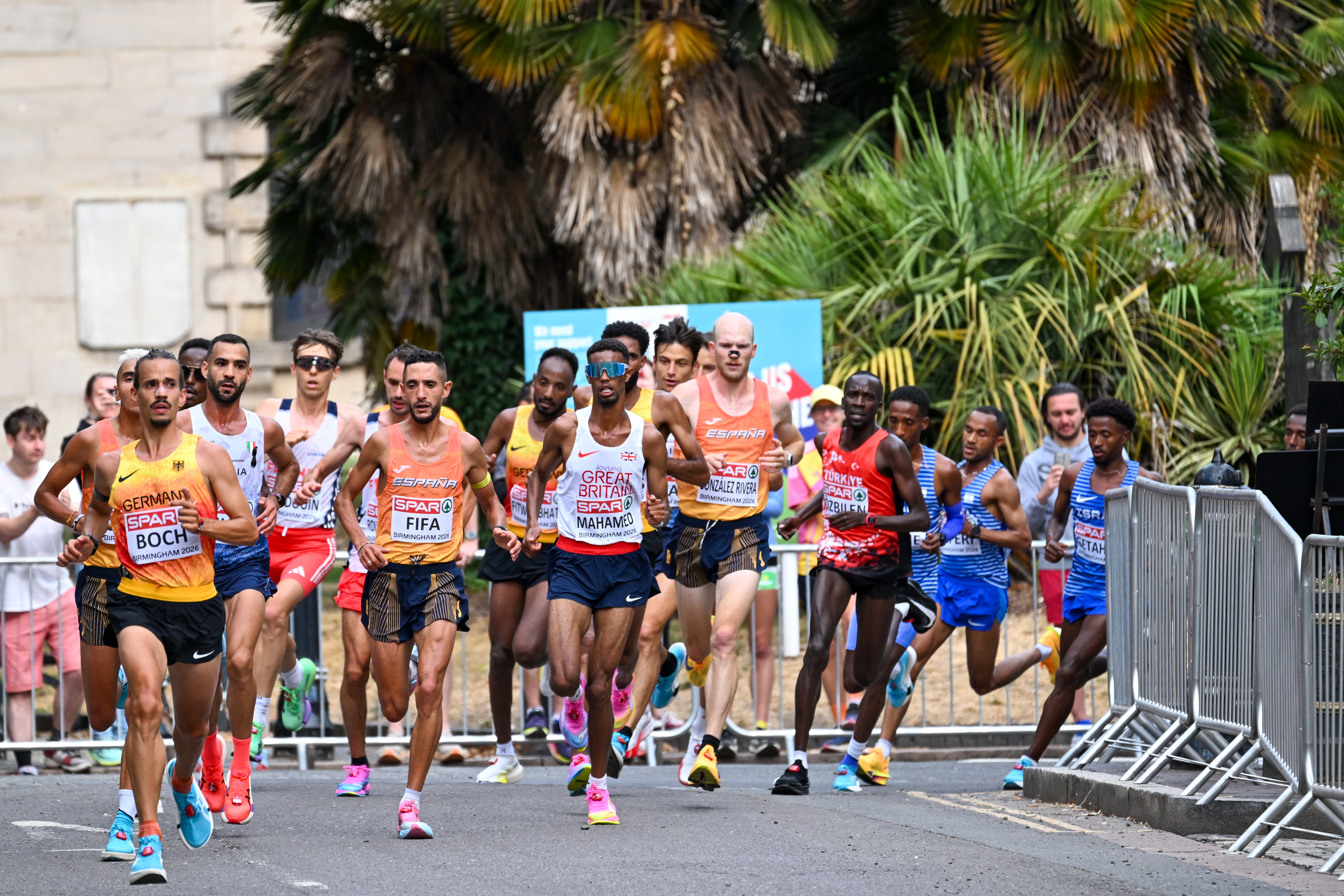
- An initial phase of the women's marathon
- Venue: Birmingham city
- Location: Birmingham, United Kingdom
- Dates: 16 August 2026
- Competitors: 35 from 9 nations
- Teams: 9
- Winning time: 7:26.01

Medalists
gold medal	Abbie Donnelly; Natasha Wilson; Rose Harvey; Louise Small; Clara Evans-Graham	Great Britain
silver medal	Rebecca Lonedo; Sofiia Yaremchuk; Giovanna Epis; Alessia Tuccitto	Italy
bronze medal	Carolina Robles; Fatima Ouhaddou; Ester Navarrete; Meritxell Soler	Spain

The women's marathon team event at the 2026 European Athletics Championships took place in Birmingham, United Kingdom, on 16 August 2026. The event, held within the women's marathon at the 2026 European Athletics Championships, doubled as the women's race for the European Marathon Cup.

== Rules ==
The ranking was compiled by adding together the times of the first three athletes from each nation to reach the finish line, however medals were awarded to all team members. Nine teams entered at least the minimum three athletes required to achieve a ranking in the team event.

== Results ==
The final results were as follows:
* : Athletes in italics were outside their nations top three finishers but received medal or placing.

Rank	Nation	Position	Time
1st place, gold medalist(s)	Great Britain		07:26:01
1st place, gold medalist(s)	Abbie Donnelly	3	02:27:33
1st place, gold medalist(s)	Natasha Wilson	5	02:27:54
1st place, gold medalist(s)	Rose Harvey	14	02:30:34
1st place, gold medalist(s)	Louise Small	22	02:33:32
1st place, gold medalist(s)	Clara Evans-Graham	34	02:40:01
2nd place, silver medalist(s)	Italy		07:28:59
2nd place, silver medalist(s)	Rebecca Lonedo	6	02:27:55
2nd place, silver medalist(s)	Sofiia Yaremchuk	7	02:28:02
2nd place, silver medalist(s)	Giovanna Epis	21	02:33:02
2nd place, silver medalist(s)	Alessia Tuccitto	31	02:39:23
3rd place, bronze medalist(s)	Spain		07:30:41
3rd place, bronze medalist(s)	Carolina Robles	8	02:28:07
3rd place, bronze medalist(s)	Fatima Ouhaddou	15	02:30:37
3rd place, bronze medalist(s)	Ester Navarrete	18	02:31:57
3rd place, bronze medalist(s)	Meritxell Soler	20	02:32:21
4	Hungary		07:38:07
4	Lili Anna Vindics-Tóth	2	02:27:21
4	Nóra Szabó	4	02:27:39
4	Kata Tomaschof	42	02:43:07
4	Réka Körmendi	48	03:02:59
5	Germany		07:46:07
5	Laura Hottenrott	16	02:31:15
5	Tabea Themann	23	02:35:18
5	Katharina Saathoff	32	02:39:34
5	Nina Reuter	41	02:42:34
5	Fabienne Königstein		DNF
6	Switzerland		07:47:53
6	Fabienne Schlumpf	19	02:32:11
6	Fabienne Vonlanthen	26	02:36:57
6	Andrea Meier	30	02:38:45
6	Samira Schnüriger	33	02:39:58
7	Israel		07:49:12
7	Selamawit Teferi	11	02:28:26
7	Maor Tiyouri	12	02:30:17
7	Mentamir Bikayia	46	02:50:29
8	Portugal		08:03:09
8	Joana Vanessa Carvalho	24	02:35:50
8	Sara Duarte	38	02:41:13
8	Mónica Silva	44	02:46:06
9	Belgium		08:12:32
9	Victoria Warpy	27	02:37:23
9	Valentine Mathy	28	02:37:32
9	Malejeva Mathijs	47	02:57:37
