= 2026 European Athletics Championships – Women's marathon =

Women's marathon at the 2026 European Athletics Championships
- Venue: Alexander Stadium
- Location: Birmingham, United Kingdom
- Dates: 16 August 2026
- Competitors: 60 (target)

Medalists
gold medal	Alisa Vainio	Finland
silver medal	Lili Anna Vindics-Tóth	Hungary
bronze medal	Abbie Donnelly	Great Britain

The women's marathon at the 2026 European Athletics Championships took place in Birmingham, United Kingdom, on 16 August 2026.

== Background ==
Records before the 2026 European Athletics Championships
Record	Athlete (nation)	Time	Location	Date
World record	Ruth Chepngetich (KEN)	2:09.56	Chicago, United States	13 October 2024
European record	Sifan Hassan (NED)	2:13.44	Chicago, United States	8 October 2024
Championship record	Christelle Daunay (FRA)	2:25:14	Zürich, Switzerland	16 August 2014
World leading	Fotyen Tesfay (ETH)	2:10.51	Barcelona, Spain	15 March 2026
European leading	Alisa Vainio (FIN)	2:20.39	Sevilla, Spain	15 February 2026

== Qualification ==
For the women's marathon, the qualification period was from 27 January 2025 to 26 July 2026. Athletes qualified by running the entry standard of 2:27.00 or faster, by wildcard for the 2022 European Athletics Champion (in 2024 this event was not held), or by their position on the World Athletics Rankings for the event. The target number was 60 athletes (eventually 56 qualified).

Qualification standings per 31 July 2026
QP	CP	Country	Athlete	Status	Details
1	1	Poland	Aleksandra Lisowska	Qualified by Wild Card	Defending European Champion
2	1	Finland	Alisa Vainio	Qualified by Entry Standard	2:20:39 - Sevilla (ESP) - 15 FEB 2026
3	1	Germany	Fabienne Königstein	Qualified by Entry Standard	2:22:17 - Berlin (GER) - 21 SEP 2025
4	1	Italy	Sofiia Yaremchuk	Qualified by Entry Standard	2:23:14 - London (GBR) - 27 APR 2025
5	1	Spain	Meritxell Soler	Qualified by Entry Standard	2:23:49 - Valencia (ESP) - 07 DEC 2025
6	1	Great Britain & N.I.	Abbie Donnelly	Qualified by Entry Standard	2:24:11 - Frankfurt (GER) - 26 OCT 2025
7	2	Spain	Fatima Azzahraa Ouhaddou Nafie	Qualified by Entry Standard	2:24:16 - Sevilla (ESP) - 15 FEB 2026
8	2	Great Britain & N.I.	Natasha Wilson	Qualified by Entry Standard	2:24:21 - Valencia (ESP) - 07 DEC 2025
9	2	Italy	Rebecca Lonedo	Qualified by Entry Standard	2:24:28 - Sevilla (ESP) - 15 FEB 2026
10	3	Spain	Ester Navarrete	Qualified by Entry Standard	2:24:31 - Valencia (ESP) - 07 DEC 2025
11	4	Spain	Carolina Robles	Qualified by Entry Standard	2:24:56 - Barcelona (ESP) - 15 MAR 2026
12	3	Great Britain & N.I.	Rose Harvey	Qualified by Entry Standard	2:25:01 - London (GBR) - 27 APR 2025
13	1	Czech Republic	Tereza Hrochová	Qualified by Entry Standard	2:25:58 - Sevilla (ESP) - 15 FEB 2026
14	1	Austria	Julia Mayer	Qualified by Entry Standard	2:26:08 - Valencia (ESP) - 07 DEC 2025
15	1	Sweden	Samrawit Mengsteab	Qualified by Entry Standard	2:26:33 - Sevilla (ESP) - 15 FEB 2026
16	2	Germany	Laura Hottenrott	Qualified by Entry Standard	2:26:56 - Düsseldorf (GER) - 27 APR 2025
17	1	Israel	Selamawit Teferi	Qualified by Entry Standard	2:26:58 - Hamburg (GER) - 26 APR 2026
18	1	Ireland	Fionnuala McCormack	Qualified by Entry Standard	2:27:00 - New York, NY (USA) - 02 NOV 2025
19	2	Israel	Maor Tiyouri	Qualified by World Rankings	26th - 1159 points
20	4	Great Britain & N.I.	Louise Small	Qualified by World Rankings	29th - 1155 points
21	1	Hungary	Nóra Szabó	Qualified by World Rankings	33rd - 1144 points
22	5	Great Britain & N.I.	Clara Evans-Graham	Qualified by World Rankings	38th - 1139 points
23	2	Hungary	Lili Anna Vindics-Tóth	Qualified by World Rankings	39th - 1137 points
24	6	Great Britain & N.I.	Lily Partridge	Qualified by World Rankings	45th - 1134 points
25	5	Spain	Laura Luengo	Qualified by World Rankings	47th - 1131 points
26	3	Germany	Nina Reuter	Qualified by World Rankings	50th - 1129 points
27	2	Sweden	Carolina Johnson	Qualified by World Rankings	53rd - 1127 points
28	1	Switzerland	Fabienne Schlumpf	Qualified by World Rankings	54th - 1124 points
29	3	Italy	Giovanna Epis	Qualified by World Rankings	58th - 1119 points
30	1	Slovenia	Liza Šajn	Qualified by World Rankings	59th - 1118 points
31	2	Finland	Susanna Saapunki	Qualified by World Rankings	62nd - 1111 points
32	4	Germany	Katharina Saathoff	Qualified by World Rankings	66th - 1107 points
33	1	Belgium	Hanne Verbruggen	Qualified by World Rankings	70th - 1100 points
34	3	Sweden	Hanna Lindholm	Qualified by World Rankings	76th - 1096 points
35	2	Switzerland	Fabienne Vonlanthen	Qualified by World Rankings	81st - 1090 points
36	2	Belgium	Victoria Warpy	Qualified by World Rankings	82nd - 1090 points
37	1	Portugal	Joana Vanessa Carvalho	Qualified by World Rankings	87th - 1085 points
38	1	Lithuania	Vaida Žūsinaite-Nekriošienė	Qualified by World Rankings	90th - 1081 points
39	4	Italy	Alessia Tuccitto	Qualified by World Rankings	96th - 1071 points
40	3	Belgium	Valentine Mathy	Qualified by World Rankings	108th - 1063 points
41	2	Austria	Eva Wutti	Qualified by World Rankings	112th - 1058 points
42	1	Denmark	Luna Paltorp	Qualified by World Rankings	120th - 1052 points
43	3	Switzerland	Andrea Meier	Qualified by World Rankings	123rd - 1050 points
44	1	Slovakia	Veronika Páleníková	Qualified by World Rankings	127th - 1048 points
45	4	Switzerland	Samira Schnüriger	Qualified by World Rankings	135th - 1045 points
46	2	Portugal	Mónica Silva	Qualified by World Rankings	138th - 1043 points
47	3	Portugal	Sara Duarte	Qualified by World Rankings	142nd - 1042 points
48	2	Denmark	Kathrine Højgaard	Qualified by World Rankings	143rd - 1040 points
49	1	Bulgaria	Marinela Nineva	Qualified by World Rankings	145th - 1038 points
50	1	Greece	Stamatia Noula	Qualified by World Rankings	147th - 1037 points
51	5	Germany	Tabea Themann	Qualified by World Rankings	148th - 1036 points
52	1	Estonia	Liis-Grete Hussar	Qualified by World Rankings	153rd - 1034 points
53	3	Denmark	Sophie Junge	Qualified by World Rankings	155th - 1031 points
54	3	Hungary	Kata Tomaschof	Qualified by World Rankings	193rd - 1006 points
55	3	Israel	Mentamir Bikayia	Qualified by World Rankings	431st - 925 points
56	4	Hungary	Réka Körmendi	Qualified by World Rankings	628th - 884 points
reserve	4	Belgium	Malejeva Mathijs	extra competitor, not listed as reserve	

Bye to semi-finals	Reserve activated	Withdrawal / reserve unused

== Schedule ==
Date	Time	Round
16 August 2026	7:30	Final

All times are local times (UTC+1)

== Results ==
Place	Athlete	Nation	Time	Notes
1st place, gold medalist(s)	Alisa Vainio	Finland	2:22:26	CR
2nd place, silver medalist(s)	Lili Anna Vindics-Tóth	Hungary	2:27:21	PB
3rd place, bronze medalist(s)	Abbie Donnelly	Great Britain	2:27:33	SB
4	Nóra Szabó	Hungary	2:27:39	SB
5	Natasha Wilson	Great Britain	2:27:54	SB
6	Rebecca Lonedo	Italy	2:27:55	
7	Sofiia Yaremchuk	Italy	2:28:02	SB
8	Carolina Robles	Spain	2:28:07	
9	Tereza Hrochová	Czech Republic	2:28:14	
10	Julia Mayer	Austria	2:28:23	SB
11	Selamawit Teferi	Israel	2:28:26	
12	Maor Tiyouri	Israel	2:30:17	
13	Aleksandra Lisowska	Poland	2:30:21	SB
14	Rose Harvey	Great Britain	2:30:34	
15	Fatima Azzahraa Ouhaddou Nafie	Spain	2:30:37	
16	Laura Hottenrott	Germany	2:31:15	SB
17	Liza Šajn	Slovenia	2:31:22	SB
18	Ester Navarrete	Spain	2:31:57	SB
19	Fabienne Schlumpf	Switzerland	2:32:11	
20	Meritxell Soler	Spain	2:32:21	SB
21	Giovanna Epis	Italy	2:33:02	SB
22	Louise Small	Great Britain	2:33:32	
23	Tabea Themann	Germany	2:35:18	
24	Joana Vanessa Carvalho	Portugal	2:35:50	
25	Hanna Lindholm	Sweden	2:36:42	SB
26	Fabienne Vonlanthen	Switzerland	2:36:57	SB
27	Victoria Warpy	Belgium	2:37:23	
28	Valentine Mathy	Belgium	2:37:32	SB
29	Vaida Žūsinaite-Nekriošienė	Lithuania	2:37:47	
30	Andrea Meier	Switzerland	2:38:45	
31	Alessia Tuccitto	Italy	2:39:23	
32	Katharina Saathoff	Germany	2:39:34	
33	Samira Schnüriger	Switzerland	2:39:58	SB
34	Clara Evans-Graham	Great Britain	2:40:01	
35	Stamatia Noula	Greece	2:40:02	SB
36	Luna Paltorp	Denmark	2:40:38	
37	Marinela Nineva	Bulgaria	2:40:58	SB
38	Sara Duarte	Portugal	2:41:13	
39	Liis-Grete Hussar	Estonia	2:41:17	
40	Carolina Johnson	Sweden	2:41:21	SB
41	Nina Reuter	Germany	2:42:34	
42	Kata Tomaschof	Hungary	2:43:07	SB
43	Kathrine Højgaard	Denmark	2:45:42	
44	Mónica Silva	Portugal	2:46:06	
45	Eva Wutti	Austria	2:47:29	
46	Mentamir Bikayia	Israel	2:50:29	SB
47	Malejeva Mathijs	Belgium	2:57:37	
48	Réka Körmendi	Hungary	3:02:59	
—	Fabienne Königstein	Germany	DNF	
—	Veronika Páleníková	Slovakia	DNF	
—	Samrawit Mengsteab	Sweden	DNF	
—	Fionnuala McCormack	Ireland	DNF	
