= Great Britain and Northern Ireland at the 2026 European Athletics Championships =

- Flag of the United Kingdom
- WA code: GBR

in Birmingham, United Kingdom 10–16 August 2026
- Competitors: 98 (49 men and 49 women)
- Medals Ranked 2nd: Gold 9 Silver 8 Bronze 2 Total 19

European Athletics Championships appearances
- 1934; 1938; 1946; 1950; 1954; 1958; 1962; 1966; 1969; 1971; 1974; 1978; 1982; 1986; 1990; 1994; 1998; 2002; 2006; 2010; 2012; 2014; 2016; 2018; 2022; 2024; 2026

Great Britain and Northern Ireland competed as the host nation at the 2026 European Athletics Championships in Birmingham, United Kingdom from 10–16 August 2026.

== Medallists ==
Medal	Name	Event	Date
Gold	Amy Hunt	Women's 100 metres	10 August
Gold	Romell Glave	Men's 100 metres	11 August
Gold	Matthew Hudson-Smith	Men's 400 metres	12 August
Gold	Amy Hunt	Women's 200 metres	13 August
Gold	Romell Glave; Zharnel Hughes; Jeremiah Azu; Louie Hinchliffe	Men's 4 × 100 metres relay	15 August
Gold	Dina Asher-Smith; Amy Hunt; Success Eduan; Imani-Lara Lansiquot; Kristal Awuah*	Women's 4 × 100 metres relay	15 August
Gold	Abbie Donnelly; Natasha Wilson; Rose Harvey; Clara Evans-Graham; Louise Small	Women's marathon team	16 August
Gold	Amy Hunt; Zharnel Hughes; Jeremiah Azu; Dina Asher-Smith	Mixed 4 × 100 metres relay	16 August
Gold	Georgia Hunter Bell	Women's 1500 metres	16 August
Silver	Yemi Mary John; Ben Jefferies; Toby Harries; Charlotte Henrich	Mixed 4 × 400 metres relay	10 August
Silver	Jeremiah Azu	Men's 100 metres	11 August
Silver	Emily Newnham	Women's 400 metres hurdles	12 August
Silver	Zharnel Hughes	Men's 200 metres	14 August
Silver	Keely Hodgkinson	Women's 800 metres	14 August
Silver	Jazmin Sawyers	Women's long jump	16 August
Silver	Yemi Mary John; Nicole Yeargin; Emily Newnham; Lina Nielsen; Charlotte Henrich*	Women's 4 × 400 metres relay	16 August
Silver	Matthew Hudson-Smith; Toby Harries; Charlie Dobson; Ben Jefferies; Malique Smith-Band*; Sam Lunt*	Men's 4 × 400 metres relay	16 August
Bronze	Dina Asher-Smith	Women's 200 metres	13 August
Bronze	Abbie Donnelly	Women's marathon	16 August

== Results ==
Great Britain and Northern Ireland entered the following athletes.

Key

- Q = Qualified for the next round
- q = Qualified for the next round as a fastest loser or, in field events, by position without achieving the qualifying target
- NR = National record
- PB = Personal best
- SB = Season best
- N/A = Round not applicable for the event

=== Men ===
Track and road events

Athlete	Event	Heat		Semifinal		Final	
Athlete	Event	Result	Rank	Result	Rank	Result	Rank
Jeremiah Azu	100 m	Bye		10.17	1 Q	10.13	2nd place, silver medalist(s)
Romell Glave	100 m	Bye		10.13	1 Q	10.09	1st place, gold medalist(s)
Louie Hinchliffe	100 m	Bye		10.30	4 q	DNS	
Zharnel Hughes	200 m	Bye		20.05	1 Q	20.16	2nd place, silver medalist(s)
Ebuka Nwokeji	200 m	20.95	5 q	20.83	6	Did not advance	
Charlie Dobson	400 m	Bye		45.18	4	Did not advance	
Matthew Hudson-Smith	400 m	Bye		44.78	2 Q	44.17	1st place, gold medalist(s)
Ben Jefferies	400 m	Bye		45.38	5	Did not advance	
Alex Botterill	800 m	1:46.90	6	Did not advance			
Max Burgin	800 m	1:45.80	1 Q	1:44.73	1 Q	DNS	
Ben Pattison	800 m	1:45.40	4 q	1:43.72	2 Q	1:46.14	6
Jake Heyward	1500 m	3:35.49	1 Q	—N/a		3:36.40	4
Arlo Ludewick	1500 m	3:36.27	6 Q	—N/a		3:36.65	5
Jake Wightman	1500 m	3:41.57	1 Q	—N/a		3:37.18	6
James West	5000 m	—N/a				13:24.63	12
Scott Beattie	10,000 m	—N/a				28:50.35	15
Joe Wigfield	10,000 m	—N/a				29:09.43	17
David Mullarkey	10,000 m	—N/a				28:25.58	12
Ellis Cross	Marathon	—N/a				DNS	
Weynay Ghebresilasie	Marathon	—N/a				DNF	
Mahamed Mahamed	Marathon	—N/a				2:09:43	7
Jonathan Mellor	Marathon	—N/a				2:27:56	50
Tewelde Menges	Marathon	—N/a				2:19:45	40
Tewelde Menges; Mahamed Mahamed; Weynay Ghebresilasie; Jonathan Mellor	Marathon team	—N/a				6:57:24	8
Sam Bennett	110 m hurdles	13.57	3 q	13.26	2 Q	13.62	7
Tade Ojora	110 m hurdles	Bye		13.48	5	Did not advance	
Alastair Chalmers	400 m hurdles	Bye		49.71	7	Did not advance	
Joshua Faulds	400 m hurdles	48.90	1 q	49.26	5	Did not advance	
Jake Minshull	400 m hurdles	Bye		48.73	5	Did not advance	
Will Battershill	3000 m steeplechase	8:37.33	8 Q	—N/a		8:34.73	14
Kristian Imroth	3000 m steeplechase	8:36.20	6 Q	—N/a		8:33.89	12
Zak Seddon	3000 m steeplechase	8:37.24	9 q	—N/a		8:35.83	15
Cameron Corbishley	Marathon walk	—N/a				3:13:31 PB	19
Jeremiah Azu; Louie Hinchliffe; Zharnel Hughes; Romell Glave	4 × 100 m relay	38.29	1 Q	—N/a		38.45	1st place, gold medalist(s)
Sam Lunt*; Ben Jefferies; Malique Smith-Band*; Matthew Hudson-Smith; Charlie Dobson; Toby Harries	4 × 400 m relay	3:01.24	2 Q	—N/a		2:59.19 SB	2nd place, silver medalist(s)

Field events

Athlete	Event	Qualification		Final	
Athlete	Event	Distance	Position	Distance	Position
Joel Clarke-Khan	High jump	2.23	1 q	2.23	5
Kimani Jack	High jump	2.23	1 q	2.23	4
Owen Heard	Pole vault	5.45	12 q	5.55	11
Stephen Mackenzie	Long jump	7.85	15	Did not advance	
Archie Yeo	Long jump	7.92	11 q	7.48	12
Scott Lincoln	Shot put	19.96	6 q	20.81	4
Lawrence Okoye	Discus throw	Withdrew			
Jake Norris	Hammer throw	75.67	9 q	74.61	11
Benjamin East	Javelin throw	78.77	13	Did not advance	

=== Women ===
Track and road events

Athlete	Event	Heat		Semifinal		Final	
Athlete	Event	Result	Rank	Result	Rank	Result	Rank
Dina Asher-Smith	100 m	Bye		11.10	3 q	11.10	5
Amy Hunt	100 m	Bye		10.99	1 Q	11.00	1st place, gold medalist(s)
Imani-Lara Lansiquot	100 m	10.99w	2 q	11.16	3	Did not advance	
Daryll Neita	100 m	Bye		11.34	6	Did not advance	
Dina Asher-Smith	200 m	Bye		22.49	1 Q	22.29	3rd place, bronze medalist(s)
Success Eduan	200 m	Bye		22.56	3 q	22.66	6
Amy Hunt	200 m	Bye		22.37	1 Q	22.19 EL	1st place, gold medalist(s)
Amber Anning	400 m	Bye		49.96 SB	2 Q	DNS	
Charlotte Henrich	400 m	Bye		50.51	3 q	51.29	6
Yemi Mary John	400 m	Bye		50.33	2 Q	51.12	5
Keely Hodgkinson	800 m	1:57.28	1 Q	1:57.38	1 Q	1:55.01	2nd place, silver medalist(s)
Jemma Reekie	800 m	1:58.45	4 q	1:58.61	1 Q	1:59.15	5
Erin Wallace	800 m	2:01.10	5	Did not advance			
Georgia Hunter Bell	1500 m	4:08.97	1 Q	—N/a		4:07.78	1st place, gold medalist(s)
Laura Muir	1500 m	4:09.66	8	—N/a		Did not advance	
Katie Snowden	1500 m	4:11.49	11	—N/a		Did not advance	
Innes FitzGerald	5000 m	—N/a				16:00.07	19
Hannah Nuttall	5000 m	—N/a				15:41.27	5
India Weir	5000 m	—N/a				15:55.42	16
Izzy Fry	10,000 m	—N/a				32:37.22	16
Megan Keith	10,000 m	—N/a				32:04.81 SB	8
Poppy Tank	10,000 m	—N/a				34:03.99	23
Abbie Donnelly	Marathon	—N/a				2:27:33 SB	3rd place, bronze medalist(s)
Clara Evans-Graham	Marathon	—N/a				2:40:01	34
Rose Harvey	Marathon	—N/a				2:30:34	14
Louise Small	Marathon	—N/a				2:33:32	22
Natasha Wilson	Marathon	—N/a				2:27:54 SB	5
Abbie Donnelly; Natasha Wilson; Rose Harvey; Louise Small; Clara Evans-Graham	Marathon team	—N/a				7:26:01	1st place, gold medalist(s)
Emma Nwofor	100 m hurdles	13.04	14 q	13.16	6	Did not advance	
Marcia Sey	100 m hurdles	Bye		12.77	2 Q	13.01	8
Emily Newnham	400 m hurdles	Bye		54.32	2 Q	53.33	2nd place, silver medalist(s)
Lina Nielsen	400 m hurdles	55.08	2 q	54.04 PB	2 Q	54.35	6
Stevie Lawrence-Wrist	3000 m steeplechase	9:48.66	10	—N/a		Did not advance	
Sarah Tait	3000 m steeplechase	9:55.17	12	—N/a		Did not advance	
Elise Thorner	3000 m steeplechase	9:32.40	1 Q	—N/a		9:18.14	5
Kristal Awuah*; Amy Hunt; Dina Asher-Smith; Success Eduan; Imani-Lara Lansiquot	4 × 100 m relay	42.37	2 Q	—N/a		42.05 EL	1st place, gold medalist(s)
Emily Newnham; Lina Nielsen; Charlotte Henrich*; Nicole Yeargin; Yemi Mary John	4 × 400 m relay	3:22.25	1 Q	—N/a		3:21.68	2nd place, silver medalist(s)

Field events

Athlete	Event	Qualification		Final	
Athlete	Event	Distance	Position	Distance	Position
Morgan Lake	High jump	1.91 SB	15 Q	1.88	8
Gemma Tutton	Pole vault	4.25	16	Did not advance	
Lucy Hadaway	Long jump	6.33	22	Did not advance	
Molly Palmer	Long jump	6.72 PB	8 q	6.54	9
Jazmin Sawyers	Long jump	6.90	4 Q	6.99 SB	2nd place, silver medalist(s)
Serena Vincent	Shot put	16.65	17	Did not advance	
Zara Obamakinwa	Discus throw	55.17	20	Did not advance	
Charlotte Payne	Hammer throw	68.89	10 q	70.12	6
Freya Jones	Javelin throw	53.93	23	Did not advance	

Combined events – Heptathlon

Athlete	Event	100H	HJ	SP	200 m	LJ	JT	800 m	Final	Rank
Katarina Johnson-Thompson	Result	14.00 SB	1.83 SB	12.79	24.46	5.77	36.92 SB	2:24.92	5790	21
Katarina Johnson-Thompson	Points	978	1016	713	937	780	608	758	5790	21
Jade O'Dowda	Result	13.21	1.71	13.69	24.51	6.35	41.56	2:16.62	6191	13
Jade O'Dowda	Points	1093	867	773	932	959	697	870	6191	13

=== Mixed ===
Track and road events

Athlete	Event	Final	
Athlete	Event	Result	Rank
Dina Asher-Smith; Jeremiah Azu; Zharnel Hughes; Amy Hunt	Mixed 4 × 100 m	39.97 ER	1st place, gold medalist(s)
Ben Jefferies; Toby Harries; Charlotte Henrich; Yemi Mary John	Mixed 4 × 400 m	3:10.47	2nd place, silver medalist(s)
