= Alex Bellos =

British writer and broadcaster

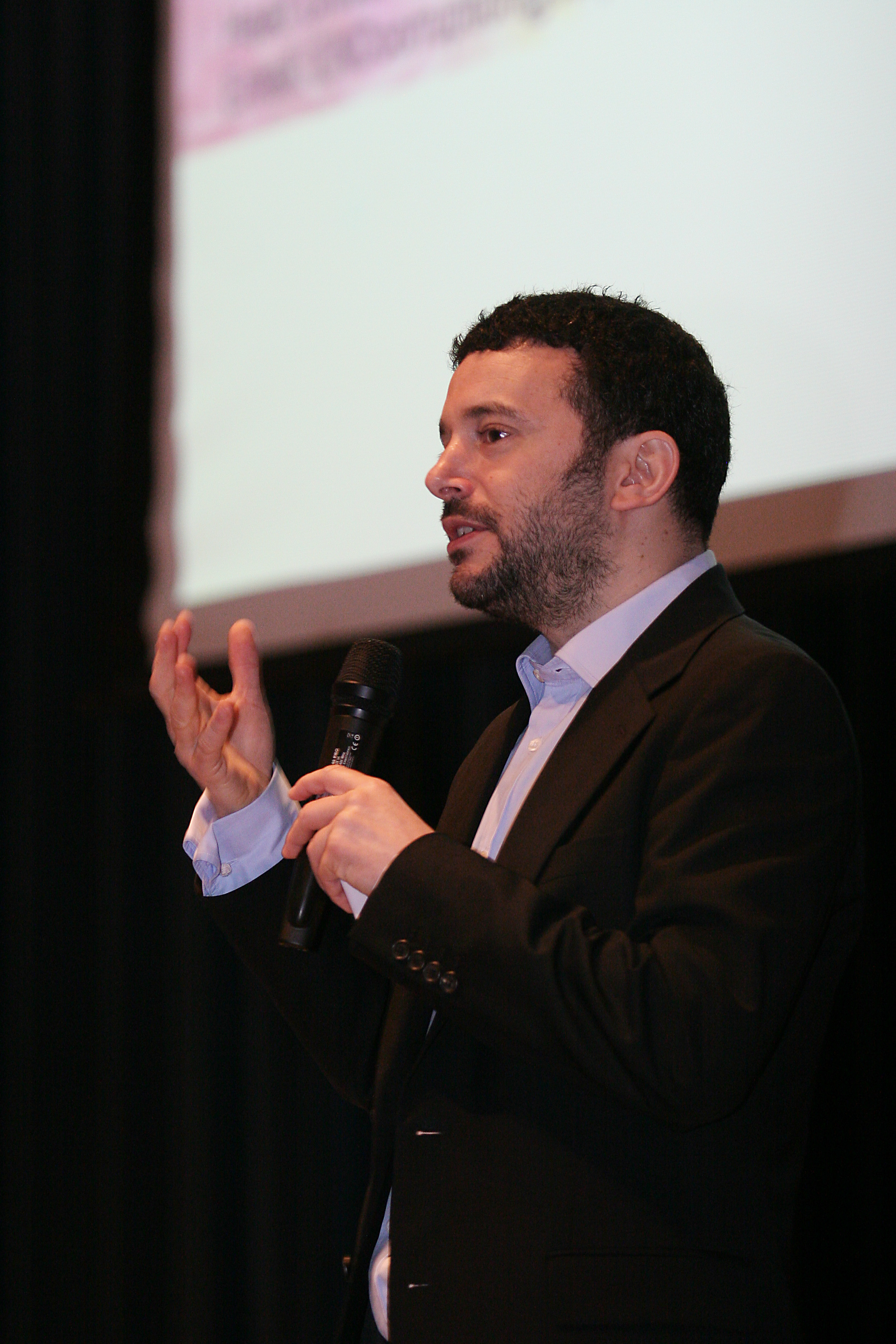
- Alex Bellos in 2011
- Born: Alexander Bellos; 1969 (age 56–57); Oxford
- Education: Hampton Park Comprehensive School; Richard Taunton Sixth Form College; University of Oxford (BA, MA)
- Employers: The Argus; The Guardian
- Awards: British Book Awards
- Website: alexbellos.com

Alexander Bellos (born 1969) is a British writer, broadcaster and mathematics communicator. He is the author of books about Brazil and mathematics, as well as having a column in The Guardian newspaper.

== Education and early life ==
Alex Bellos was born in Oxford and grew up in Edinburgh and Southampton. He was educated at Hampton Park Comprehensive School and Richard Taunton Sixth Form College in Southampton. He went on to study mathematics and philosophy at Corpus Christi College, Oxford, where he was the editor of the student paper Cherwell.

== Career ==
Bellos's first job was working for The Argus in Brighton before moving to The Guardian in London in 1994. From 1998 to 2003 he was South America correspondent of The Guardian, and wrote Futebol: the Brazilian Way of Life. The book was well received in the UK, where it was nominated for sports book of the year at the British Book Awards. In the US, it was included as one of Publishers Weekly's books of the year. They wrote: “Compelling...Alternately funny and dark...Bellos offers a cast of characters as colorful as a Carnival parade”. In 2006, he ghostwrote Pelé: The Autobiography, about the soccer player Pelé, which was a number one best-seller in the UK.

Returning to live in the UK, Bellos decided to write about mathematics. The book Alex's Adventures in Numberland was published in 2010 and spent four months in The Sunday Times' top ten best-sellers' list. The Daily Telegraph described the book as a "mathematical wonder that will leave you hooked on numbers." The book was shortlisted for three awards in the UK, including the BBC Samuel Johnson Prize for Non-Fiction 2010. The Guardian reported that Bellos's book was narrowly beaten into second place. Chairman of the judges Evan Davis broke with protocol to discuss their deliberations: "[Bellos's] was a book everyone thought would be nice if it won, because it would be good for people to read a maths book. Some of us wished we'd read it when we were 14 years old. If we'd taken the view that this is a book everyone ought to read, then it might have gone that way."

Several translations of the book have been published. The Italian version, Il meraviglioso mondo dei numeri, won both the €10,000 Galileo Prize for science books and the 2011 Peano Prize for mathematics books. In the United States, the book was given the title Here's Looking at Euclid.

Alex Through The Looking-Glass: How Life Reflects Numbers and Numbers Reflect Life was published in 2014 and received positive reviews. The Daily Telegraph wrote: “If anything, Looking Glass is a better work than Numberland – it feels more immediate, more relevant and more fun.” Its US title was The Grapes of Math, about which The New York Times said Bellos was: “a charming and eloquent guide to math’s mysteries…There’s an interesting fact or mathematical obsessive on almost every page. And for its witty flourishes, it’s never shallow. Bellos doesn’t shrink from delving into equations, which should delight aficionados who relish those kinds of details.”

Bellos presented the BBC TV series Inside Out Brazil (2003), and also authored the documentary Et Dieu créa…le foot, about football in the Amazon rainforest, which was shown on the National Geographic Channel. His short films on the Amazon have appeared on BBC, More4 and Al Jazeera. He also appears frequently on the BBC talking about mathematics. His Radio 4 documentary Nirvana by Numbers was shortlisted for best radio programme in the 2014 Association of British Science Writers Awards.

Bellos appeared in the 2023 Christmas University Challenge series as team captain of Oxford's Corpus Christi team, reaching the final, only to be beaten by the Middlesex team.

== Publications ==
=== On football ===
- Futebol: The Brazilian Way of Life (2002)
- Pelé, The Autobiography (2006) (as ghostwriter)
- Football School Season 1 with Ben Lyttleton and illustrated by Spike Gerrell (2016)
- Football School Season 2 with Ben Lyttleton and illustrated by Spike Gerrell (2017)

=== On mathematics ===
- (2010) Alex's Adventures in Numberland / Here's Looking at Euclid ISBN 1526623994
- (2014) Alex Through the Looking-Glass / The Grapes of Math ISBN 1408817772
- (2015) Snowflake Seashell Star: Colouring Adventures in Numberland with Edmund Harris ISBN 1782117881
- (2016) Can You Solve My Problems?: Ingenious, Perplexing, and Totally Satisfying Math and Logic Puzzles ISBN 1783351144
- (2016) Visions of Numberland / Patterns of the Universe with Edmund Harriss ISBN 9781408888988
- (2017) Puzzle Ninja: Pit Your Wits Against the Japanese Puzzle Masters ISBN 145217105X
- (2019) So You Think You've Got Problems?: Puzzles to flex, stretch and sharpen your mind ISBN 178335190X
- (2020) The Language Lover’s Puzzle Book: Lexical perplexities and cracking conundrums from across the globe ISBN 1783352183

=== Awards and honours ===
- 2019 Shortlisted for the Chalkdust Magazine Book of the Year for So You Think You've Got Problems?
- 2017 Shortlisted for the Blue Peter Book Award for Best Book with Facts for Football School: Where Football Explains the World
- 2012 Premio Letterario Galileo, winner, Il meraviglioso mondo dei numeri
- 2012 Peano Prize, winner, Il meraviglioso mondo dei numeri
- 2011 Shortlisted for the Royal Society Prizes for Science Books for Alex's Adventures in Numberland
- 2010 Amazon.com, Best Books of 2010: Science for Here's Looking at Euclid
- 2010 Shortlisted for the British Book Awards, Non-Fiction Book of the Year for Alex's Adventures in Numberland
- 2010 Shortlisted for the BBC Samuel Johnson Prize for Non-Fiction for Alex's Adventures in Numberland
- 2004 Shortlisted for British Book Awards, Sports Book of the Year for Futebol: The Brazilian Way of Life
- 2003 Shortlisted for National Sporting Club British Sports Book Awards Futebol: The Brazilian Way of Life

== Personal life ==
Bellos lives in London and is married with children. His father David Bellos (1945–2025) was a translator, biographer and academic and his mother is Hungarian.
