= Glen Eyre =

Glen Eyre may refer to:

- Glen Eyre Halls of Residence, a hall of residence of the University of Southampton
- Glen Eyre High School, a former school in Southampton since replaced by Cantell School

== See also ==
- Glen Eyrie, an 1871 Tudor-style castle in Colorado Springs, Colorado, US
