= 2025 London Marathon =

45th annual marathon race in London

45th London Marathon
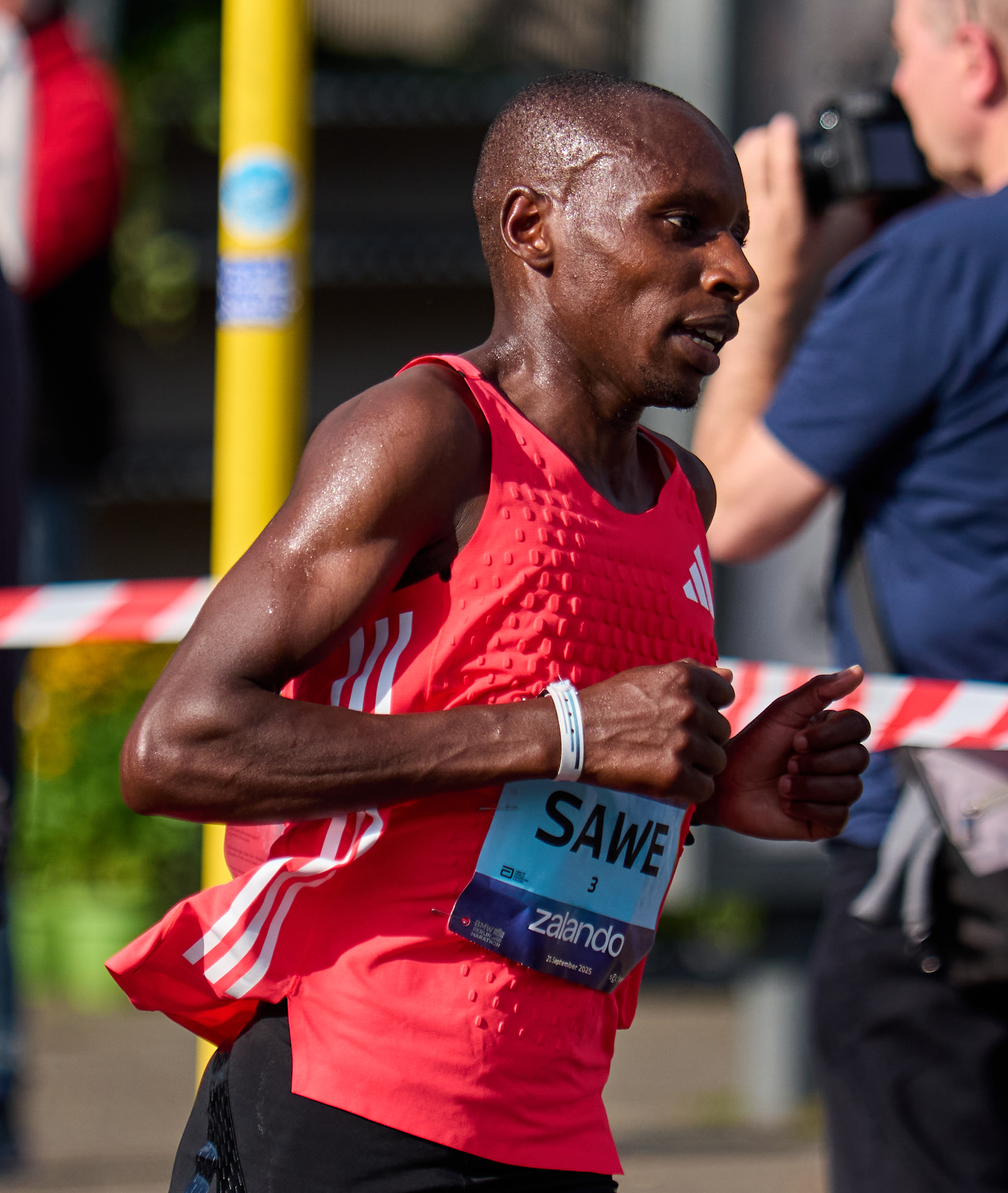
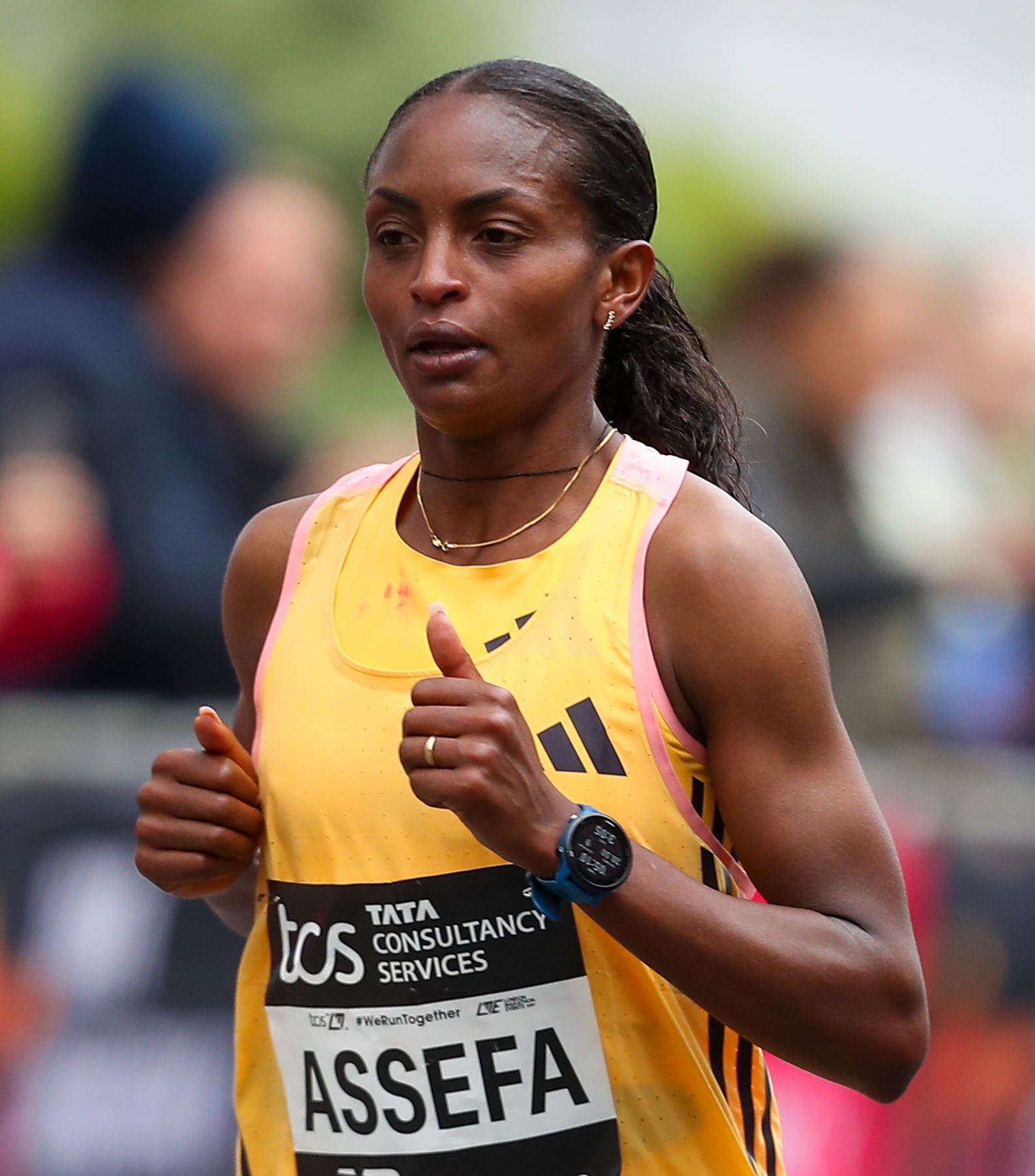
- Sabastian Sawe and Tigst Assefa, the men's and women's winners
- Venue: London, England
- Date: 27 April 2025

Champions
- Men: Sabastian Sawe (2:02:27)
- Women: Tigst Assefa (2:15:50)
- Wheelchair men: Marcel Hug (1:25:25)
- Wheelchair women: Catherine Debrunner (1:34:18)

The 2025 London Marathon was the 45th running of the London Marathon; it took place on 27 April 2025.

The Elite Men's winner was Sabastian Sawe getting to Buckingham Palace in 2:02:25 with the Elite Woman's winner being Tigst Assefa in a time of 2:15:50 a new women-only marathon record.

The wheelchair races were both won by Swiss athletes with Marcel Hug winning his seventh title in a time of 1:25:25 and Catherine Debrunner winning for the third time in 1:34:15.

This 45th edition of London Marathon had 56,640 finishers crossing the finishing line at The Mall, breaking 55,646 finishers in TCS New York Marathon 2024 held at Nov 3 2024, being the newest Guinness World Record of largest number of finishers in a marathon.

== Results ==
=== Men ===
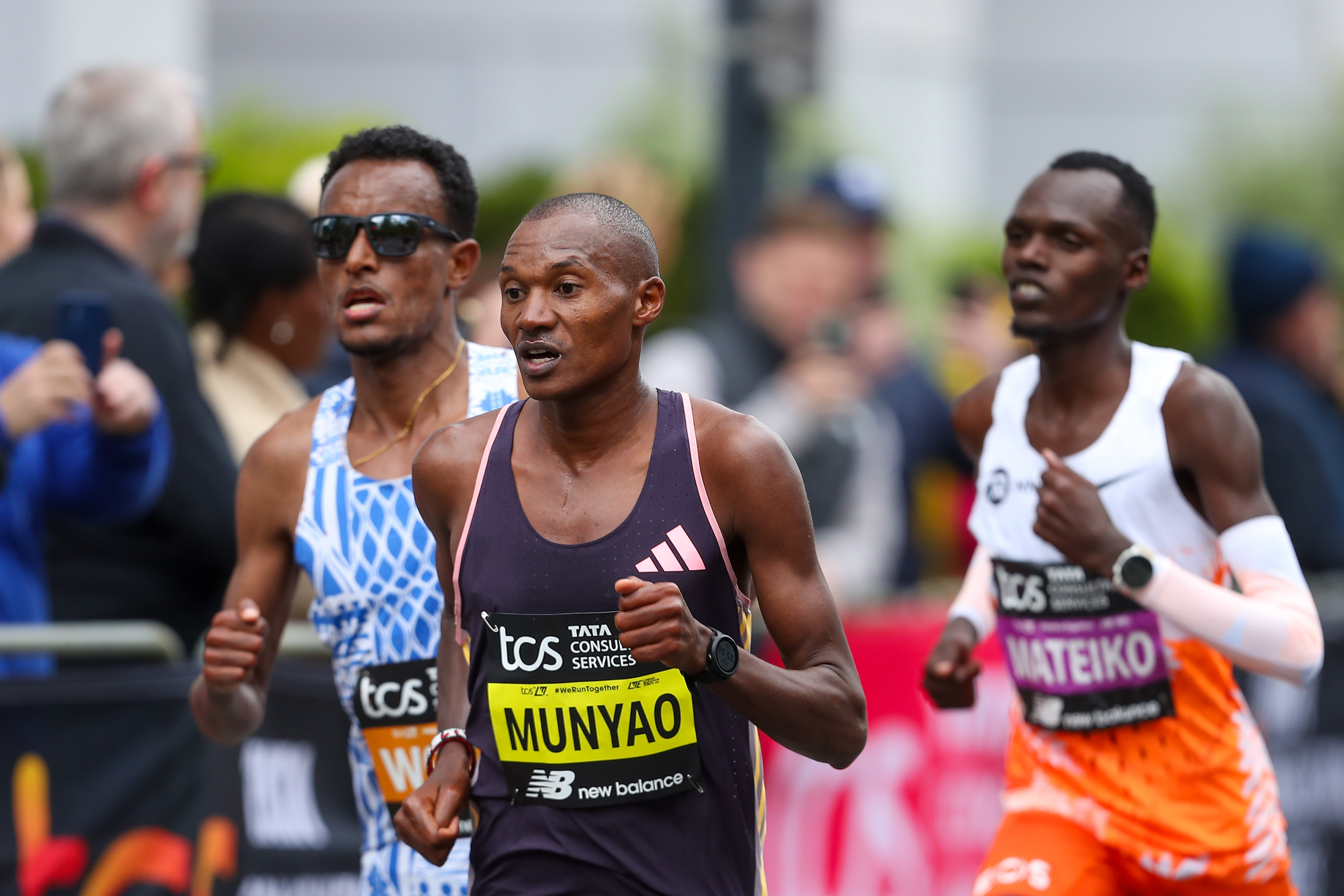
2024 winner Alexander Mutiso Munyao finished third in 2025.

Elite men's top 10 finishers
Position	Athlete	Nationality	Time
1st place, gold medalist(s)	Sabastian Sawe	Kenya	02:02:27
2nd place, silver medalist(s)	Jacob Kiplimo	Uganda	02:03:37
3rd place, bronze medalist(s)	Alexander Mutiso Munyao	Kenya	02:04:20
4	Abdi Nageeye	Netherlands	02:04:20
5	Tamirat Tola	Ethiopia	02:04:42
6	Eliud Kipchoge	Kenya	02:05:25
7	Hillary Kipkoech	Kenya	02:06:05
8	Amanal Petros	Germany	02:06:30
9	Mahamed Mahamed	United Kingdom	02:08:52
10	Milkesa Mengesha	Ethiopia	02:09:01

=== Women ===
Elite women's top 10 finishers
Position	Athlete	Nationality	Time
1st place, gold medalist(s)	Tigst Assefa	Ethiopia	02:15:50
2nd place, silver medalist(s)	Joyciline Jepkosgei	Kenya	02:18:44
3rd place, bronze medalist(s)	Sifan Hassan	Netherlands	02:19:00
4	Haven Hailu Desse	Ethiopia	02:19:17
5	Vivian Cheruiyot	Kenya	02:22:32
6	Stella Chesang	Uganda	02:22:42
7	Sofiia Yaremchuk	Italy	02:23:14
8	Eilish McColgan	United Kingdom	02:24:24
9	Rose Harvey	United Kingdom	02:25:01
10	Susanna Sullivan	United States	02:29:30

=== Wheelchair men ===
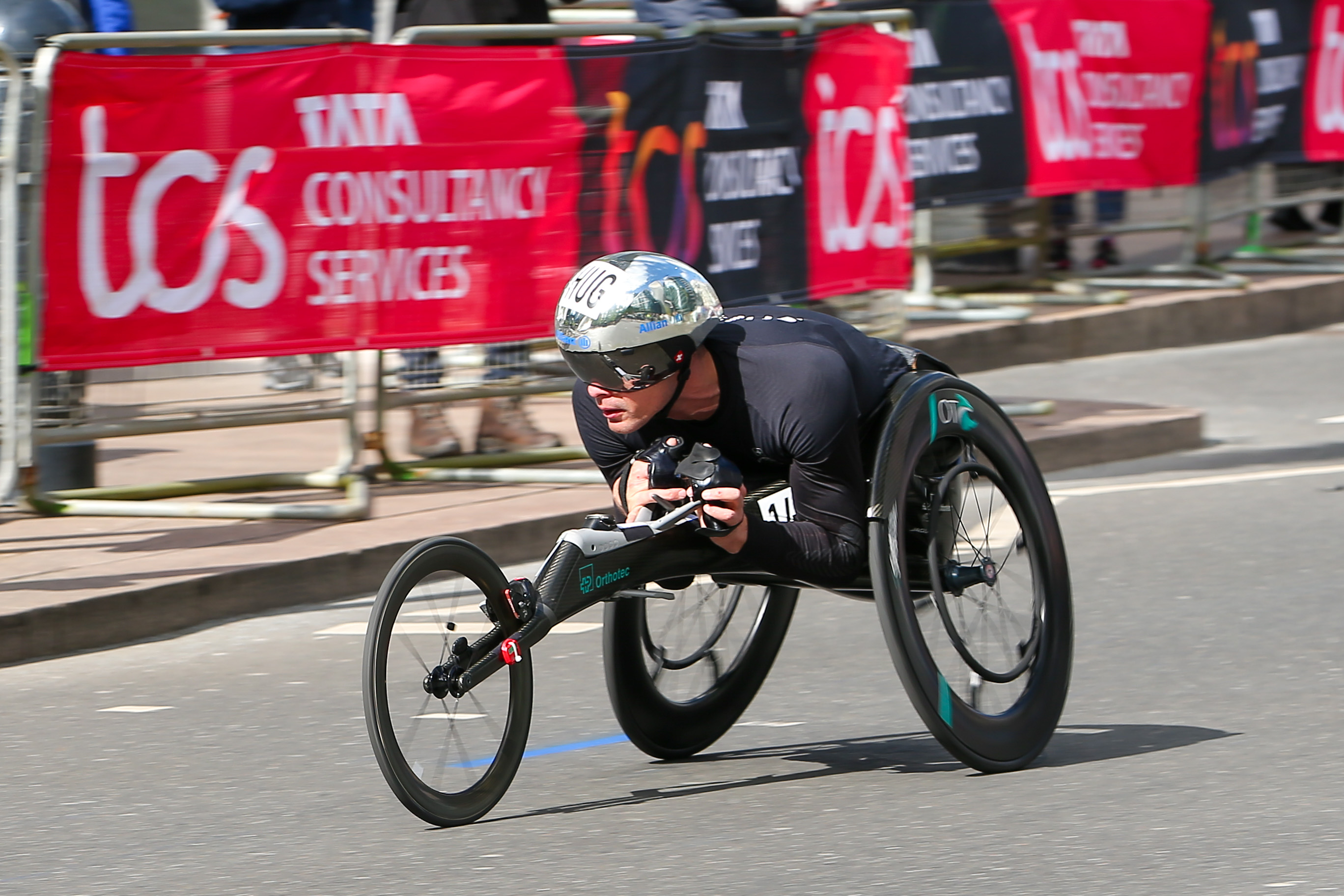
Marcel Hug won the wheelchair men's event.

Wheelchair men's top 10 finishers
Position	Athlete	Nationality	Time
1st place, gold medalist(s)	Marcel Hug	Switzerland	01:25:25
2nd place, silver medalist(s)	Tomoki Suzuki	Japan	01:26:09
3rd place, bronze medalist(s)	Jetze Plat	Netherlands	01:26:49
4	Geert Schipper	Netherlands	01:26:51
5	Daniel Romanchuk	United States	01:30:31
6	David Weir	United Kingdom	01:34:06
7	Sho Watanabe	Japan	01:34:06
8	Kota Hokinoue	Japan	01:34:08
9	Hiroki Kishizawa	Japan	01:34:09
10	Nathan Maguire	United Kingdom	01:34:17

=== Wheelchair women ===
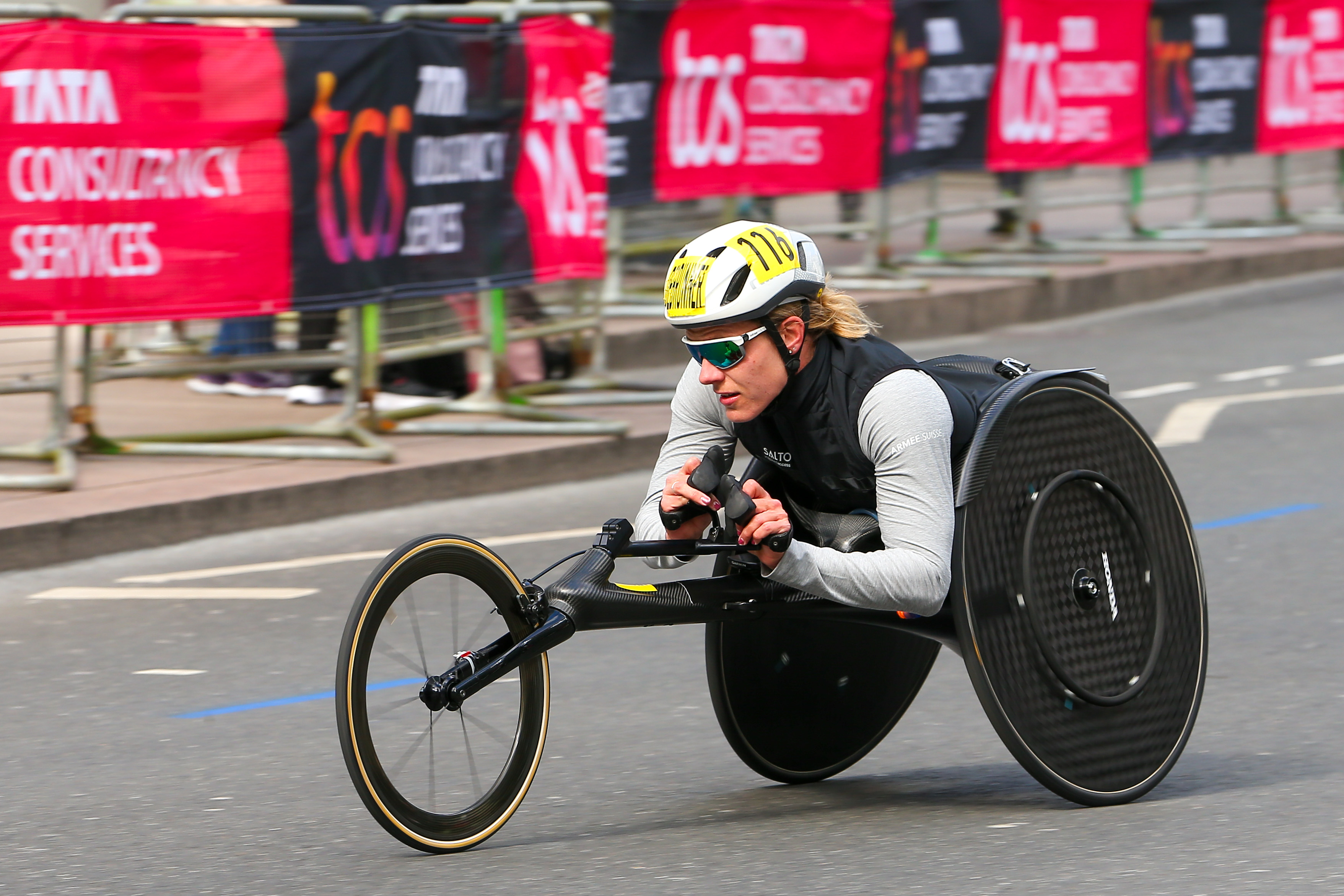
Catherine Debrunner won the wheelchair women's event.

Wheelchair women's top 10 finishers
Position	Athlete	Nationality	Time
1st place, gold medalist(s)	Catherine Debrunner	Switzerland	01:34:18
2nd place, silver medalist(s)	Susannah Scaroni	United States	01:38:08
3rd place, bronze medalist(s)	Manuela Schär	Switzerland	01:41:06
4	Eden Rainbow-Cooper	United Kingdom	01:44:49
5	Tatyana McFadden	United States	01:46:50
6	Jade Jones-Hall	United Kingdom	01:46:51
7	Sammi Kinghorn	United Kingdom	01:46:54
8	Patricia Eachus	Switzerland	01:47:55
9	Wakako Tsuchida	Japan	01:47:55
10	Vanessa de Souza	Brazil	01:47:57
