= Haven Hailu Desse =

Ethiopian long-distance runner

Haven Hailu
Personal information
- Nationality: Ethiopian
- Born: Haven Hailu Desse; 10 September 1998 (age 28) Ethiopia
- Occupation: Long-distance runner
- Years active: 2018–present

Sport
- Country: Ethiopia
- Sport: Long-distance running
- Events: Marathon, Half marathon

Achievements and titles
- Personal bests: Marathon: 2:19:17 (London, 2025)

Haven Hailu Desse (born 10 September 1998) is an Ethiopian long-distance runner who specializes in the marathon and half marathon. She has won major international marathons including Rotterdam and Osaka, and placed fourth at the 2025 London Marathon, where she set a personal best of 2:19:17.

== Career ==
At the 2020 Mumbai Marathon, Haven finished third in 2:28:56. At the 2021 Amsterdam Marathon, she lowered her personal best to 2:20:19 and secured another third-place finish.

In 2022, she achieved her first major international win at the Rotterdam Marathon, finishing in 2:22:01. This was followed by a commanding victory at the Osaka Women's Marathon in early 2023, where she clocked 2:21:13.

In January 2025 she won the 50th edition of the Egmond Half Marathon in a new course record.

Her most notable performance to date came at the 2025 London Marathon, one of the sport's premier World Marathon Majors. She placed fourth while setting a new lifetime best of 2:19:17.

== Personal bests ==
- Marathon: 2:19:17 – London, 2025

== Major results ==
| Year | Competition | Location | Position | Time |
|---|---|---|---|---|
| 2020 | Mumbai Marathon | Mumbai, India | 3rd | 2:28:56 |
| 2021 | Amsterdam Marathon | Amsterdam, Netherlands | 3rd | 2:20:19 |
| 2022 | Rotterdam Marathon | Rotterdam, Netherlands | 1st | 2:22:01 |
| 2023 | Osaka Women's Marathon | Osaka, Japan | 1st | 2:21:13 |
| 2025 | London Marathon | London, United Kingdom | 4th | 2:19:17 (PB) |
