= Mahamed Mahamed =

British athlete (born 1997)

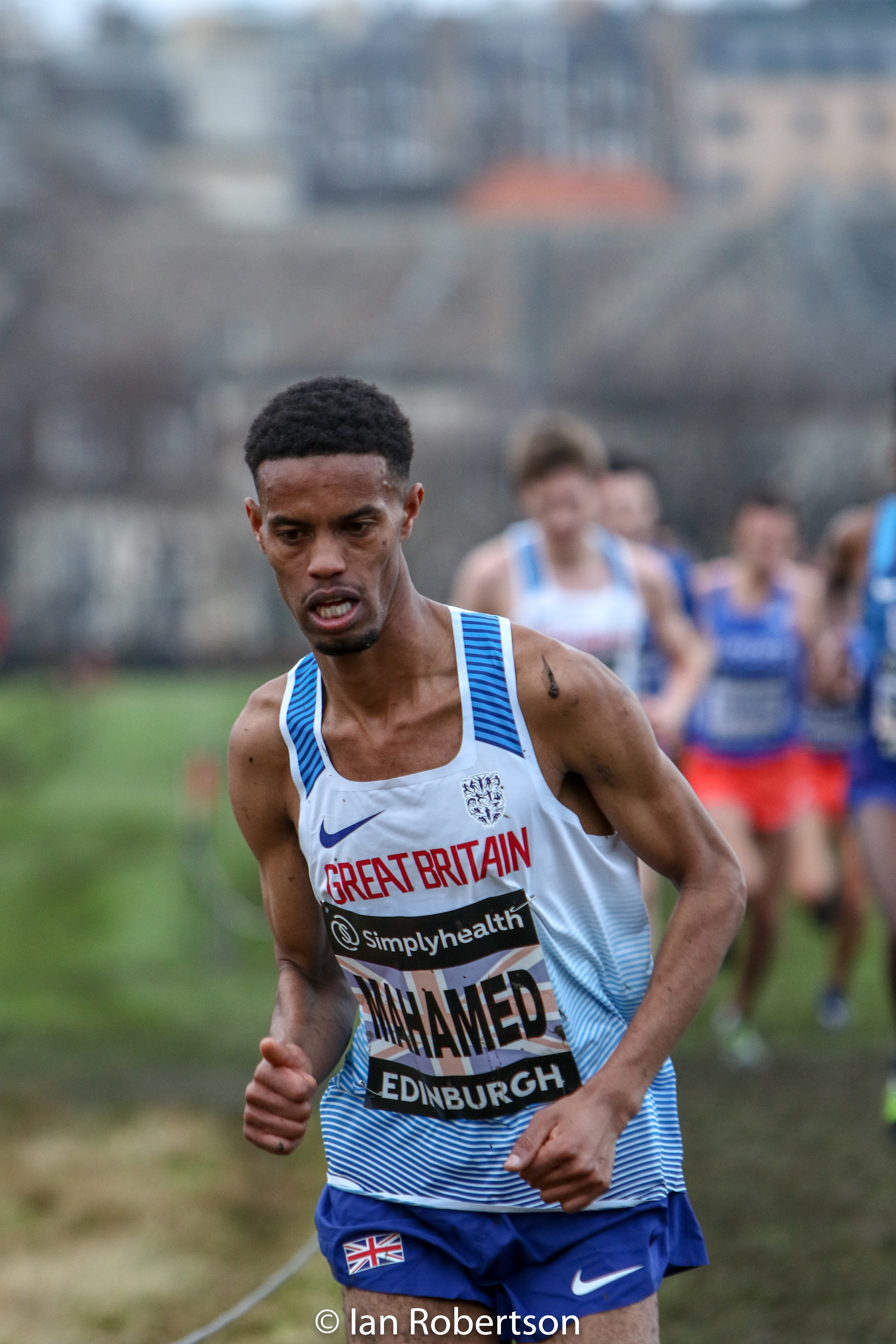
- Mahamed in 2018

Personal information
- Nationality: British/Ethiopian
- Born: 18 September 1997 (age 29) Jarso, Ethiopia
- Education: Cantell School; Itchen College; Southampton Solent University
- Height: 6 ft 3 in (191 cm)

Sport
- Sport: Athletics
- Events: Cross country, marathon
- Club: Southampton Athletic Club

Achievements and titles
- Personal bests: Half marathon: 1:01:09 (Barcelona, 2026); Marathon: 2:06:14 (London, 2026)

Mahamed Mahamed (born 18 September 1997) is a British long distance runner. He has represented Great Britain at senior level and is a twice English National Cross Country Champion. He is second on the British all-time list for the marathon, running 2:06.14 in April 2026 at the London Marathon.

== Early life ==
Mahamed was born in Jarso, Ethiopia on 18 September 1997 and emigrated to Southampton in England with his family in 2011 when he was thirteen years-old. He attended Cantell School in Bassett, Southampton. He also attended Itchen College and studied for a degree in sports coaching and sports development at Southampton Solent University.

== Career ==
Mahamed won the national U17 cross country title at Parliament Hill, London on 25 February 2015.

Running for Southampton AC, Mahamed won both the English U20 National Championship and the Inter-Counties cross country championships in 2018.

He won the senior English National Cross Country Championships in 2019, and again in 2022. Between those victories, he was selected for the 2019 IAAF World Cross Country Championships in Aarhus, and he won the British Universities and Colleges Sport (BUCS) Cross Country Championships in Edinburgh in February 2020.

In September 2023, he finished second at The Big Half in London behind Jack Rowe and ahead of Andrew Butchart and Mo Farah, in his final race.

At his debut over the marathon distance at the Valencia Marathon in December 2023, he clocked 2:08:42, placing him seventh in the UK all-time rankings.

He finished fourth at the 2024 London Marathon in a personal best 2:07.05. This made him the third-fastest Briton ever over the distance and came under the qualifying time for the summer Olympics. On 26 April 2024, he was selected by British Athletics for the 2024 Summer Olympics in Paris, where he finished in 57th place. He finished in ninth place at the 2025 London Marathon.

Mahamed ran a personal best 61:09 for the half marathon in Barcelona in February 2026. At the 2026 London Marathon, Mahamed moved to second on the British all-time rankings with a time of 2:06:14, placing tenth overall behind Sabastian Sawe as he ran a world record 1:59:30. He was second in the British Road 10 km Championships at the Great Manchester Run in England on 31 May 2026, running 28:28. On 16 August, Mahamed finished in seventh place in 2:09.43 in the marathon at the 2026 European Championships in Birmingham. In October 2026, he moved up to podium potential in the 2026-27 Olympic World Class Programme awarded by UK Athletics.

== Personal life ==
A Muslim, Mahamed has explained to BBC News how keeping his fitness whilst he observes Ramadan is a challenge but worthwhile to his faith. His brother Zak Mahamed is also a long-distance runner and was selected to represent Great Britain and Northern Ireland at the 2021 European Cross Country Championships in Fingal-Dublin, Ireland.
