= Eva Wutti =

Austrian cyclist

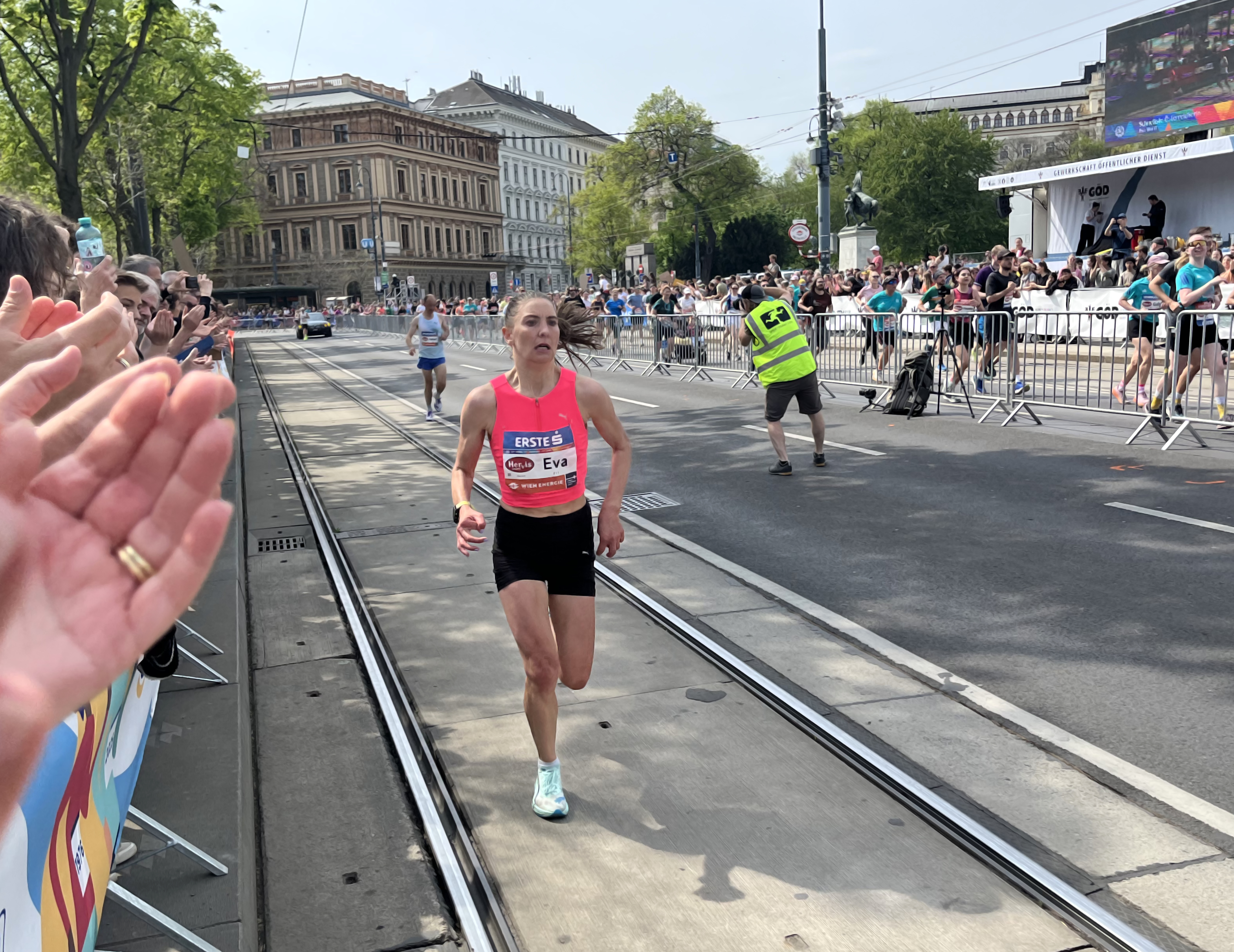
- Eva Wutti in 2026

Personal information
- Born: 26 February 1989 (age 37)

Cycling career
- Sport: Cycling
- Role: Rider

Eva Wutti (born 26 February 1989) is an Austrian professional racing cyclist and triathlonist turned long-distance runner. She rided for the No Radunion Vitalogic team.

== See also ==
- List of 2015 UCI Women's Teams and riders
