= Alessia Tuccitto =

Italian long-distance runner

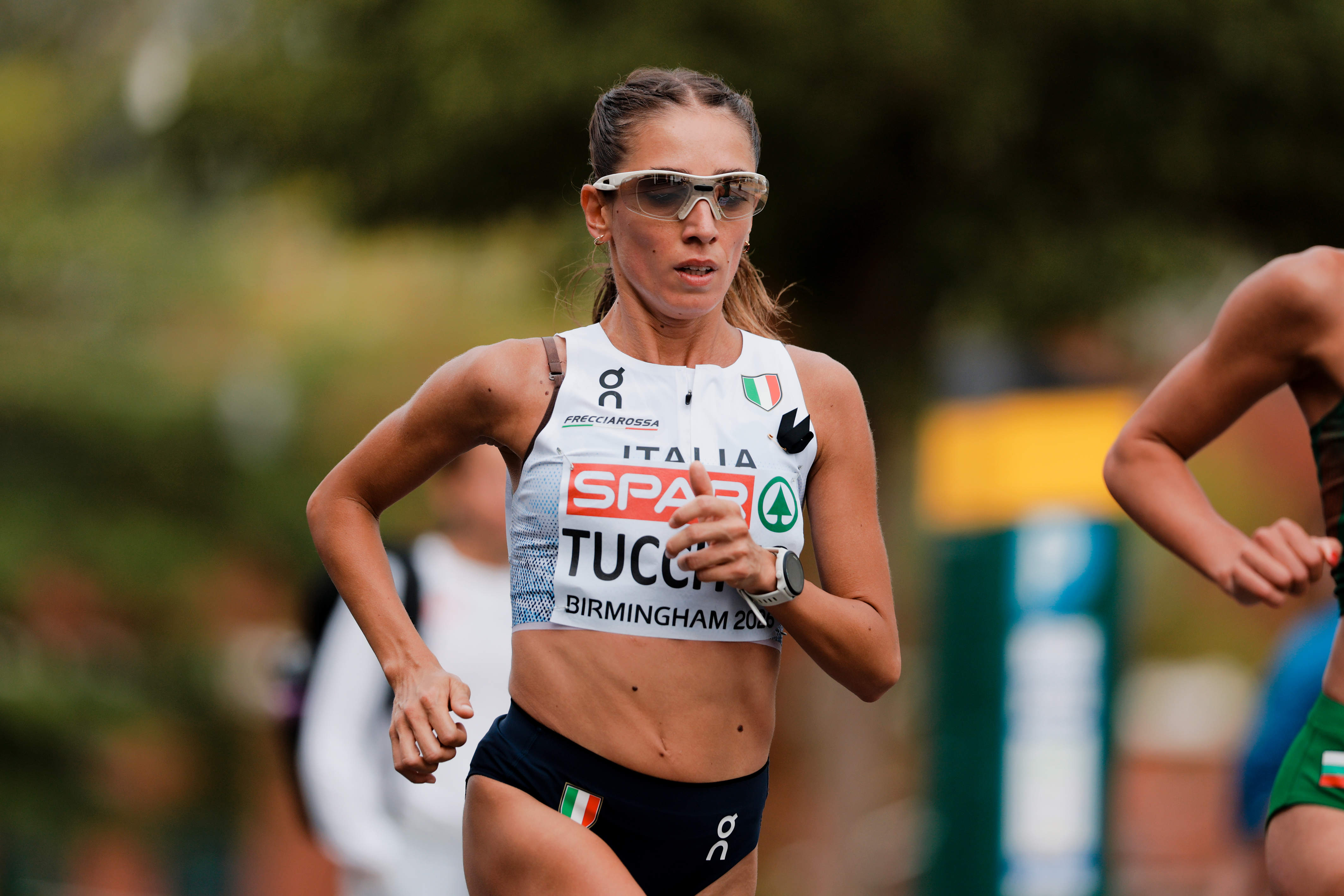
- Tuccitto at Birmingham 2026

Personal information
- National team: Italy
- Born: 26 October 1997 (age 28) Syracuse, Italy
- Height: 1.50 m (4 ft 11 in)
- Weight: 41 kg (90 lb)

Sport
- Sport: Athletics
- Event: Long-distance running
- Club: Caivano Runners (2023-25); Imperiali Atletica (2026- )
- Coached by: Fabio Martelli; Piero Incalza & Najibe Marco Salami (2025- )

Achievements and titles
- Personal bests: Half marathon: 1:16:24 (2026); Marathon: 2:36:16 (2026)
Medal record
Women's athletics
Representing Italy
European Athletics Championships
Silver medal – second place	2026 Birmingham	Marathon team

Alessia Tuccitto (born 26 October 1997) is an Italian marathon runner.

== Career ==
In 2026, Tuccitto won the silver medal with the Italian marathon team at the European Championships in Birmingham.

== Achievements ==
Year	Competition	Venue	Position	Event	Time	Notes
2026	European Championships	(United Kingdom) Birmingham	31th	Marathon	2:33:02	
2026	European Championships	(United Kingdom) Birmingham	2nd	Marathon team	7:28:59	(Note: The team's time was taken on the first three athletes, Tuccitto fourth of the blues was still awarded with the medal.)

== National titles ==
Tuccitto won two national championships at individual senior level.

- Italian Athletics Championships
  - Marathon: 2024, 2026

== See also ==
- Italy at the 2026 European Athletics Championships
