= Carolina Robles =

Spanish athlete

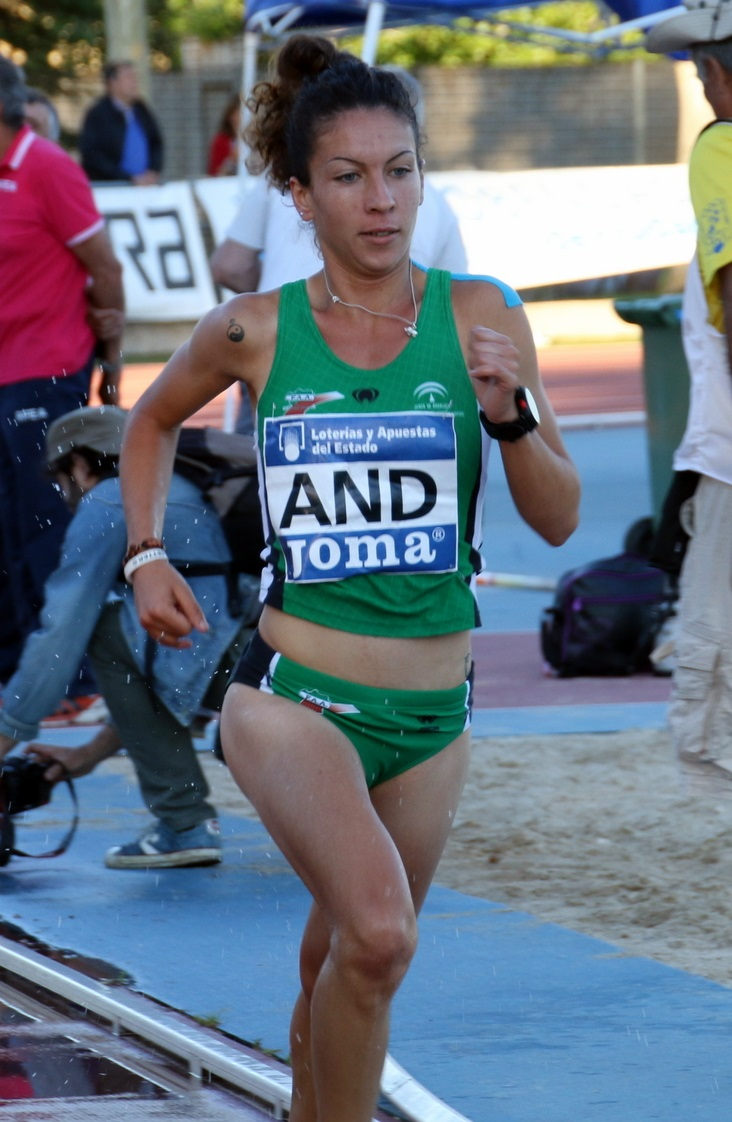
- Robles in 2016

Personal information
- Full name: Carolina Robles Campos
- Nationality: Spanish
- Born: 4 December 1991 (age 34) Seville, Spain
- Height: 163 cm (5 ft 4 in)
- Weight: 50 kg (110 lb)

Sport
- Sport: Track and Field
- Events: 3000m steeplechase, Marathon
Medal record
Women's athletics
Representing Spain
European Athletics Championships
Bronze medal – third place	2026 Birmingham	Marathon team

Carolina Robles Campos (Note: In this Spanish name, the first or paternal surname is Robles and the second or maternal family name is Campos.) (born 4 December 1991) is a Spanish steeplechaser and long-distance runner. She has won multiple Spanish national titles in the 3000 metres steeplechase, as well as over 10,000 metres and in cross country running. She also won the Spanish national title on her marathon debut in 2026, and led Spain to team bronze in the marathon at the 2026 European Athletics Championships. She competed for Spain at the 2020 and 2024 Olympic Games.

== Biography ==
Robles ran the women's 3000 metres steeplechase at the 2020 Summer Olympics, where she finished thirteenth in heat three after falling during the race.

She ran a personal best 9.28.24 for the 3000m steeplechase at the 2022 World Athletics Championships in Eugene, Oregon. She qualified for the final and placed eleventh overall at the 2022 European Athletics Championships in Munich in August 2022.

Competing in the 3000m steeplechase at the 2023 World Athletics Championships in Budapest, she finishing eighth in her heat running 9:34.41.

In January 2024, she won the Spanish national cross country championship in Getafe. In March 2024, she won the Spanish national title over 10,000 metres. She was selected for the 2024 European Athletics Championships in Rome in June 2024, where she placed eighth in the final of the 3000m steeplechase. Later that month, she won the Spanish national title over that distance in a personal best 9:22.19. She competed at the 2024 Summer Olympics in the Women's 3000 metres steeplechase.

In December 2024, she won the Cross Internacional de Venta de Banos. In January 2025, she finished fourth at the Cross Internacional Juan Muguerza in Elgoibar. In February 2025, she finished fifth at the Almond Blossom Cross Country on the World Athletics Cross Country Tour. She had a top-ten finish at the Cross Internacional de Itálica in Spain, in November 2025, a World Athletics Cross Country Tour Gold race.

On 10 January 2026, she placed 30th overall at the 2026 World Athletics Cross Country Championships. In February 2026, she placed fourth at the Almond Blossom Cross Country race, in Albufeira, Portugal. Robles made debut in the marathon in March at the Spanish National Championships in Barcelona, where she became Spanish champion. On 16 August, Robles placed eighth in the marathon at the 2026 European Championships in Birmingham, which helped Spain win the team bronze medal. In November, she had a top-ten finish at the Cross Internacional de Itálica in Seville.

== Personal life ==
She runs an athletics school in Dos Hermanas, Spain. Her partner Daniel Manzanares and her younger sister Carmen Robles have competed in athletics at a national level in Spain.

== International competitions ==
Year	Competition	Venue	Position	Event	Notes
Representing Spain
2021	Olympic Games	Tokyo, Japan	14th	3000 m s'chase	9:50.96
2022	Ibero-American Championships	La Nucía, Spain	6th	3000 m s'chase	9:54.13
2022	World Championships	Eugene, United States	26th (h)	3000 m s'chase	9:28.24
2022	European Championships	Munich, Germany	11th	3000 m s'chase	9:38.96
2023	World Cross Country Championships	Bathurst, Australia	50th	10 km XC	38:10
2023	World Championships	Budapest, Hungary	26th (h)	3000 m s'chase	9:34.41
2024	World Cross Country Championships	Belgrade, Serbia	24th	10 km XC	33:36
2024	European Championships	Rome, Italy	8th	3000 m s'chase	9:23.75
2024	Olympic Games	Paris, France	19th (h)	3000 m s'chase	9:22.48
2025	European Running Championships	Leuven, Belgium	23rd	10 km	32:44
2026	European Championships	Birmingham, United Kingdom	8th	Marathon	2:28:07
