= Louise Small =

British long-distance runner

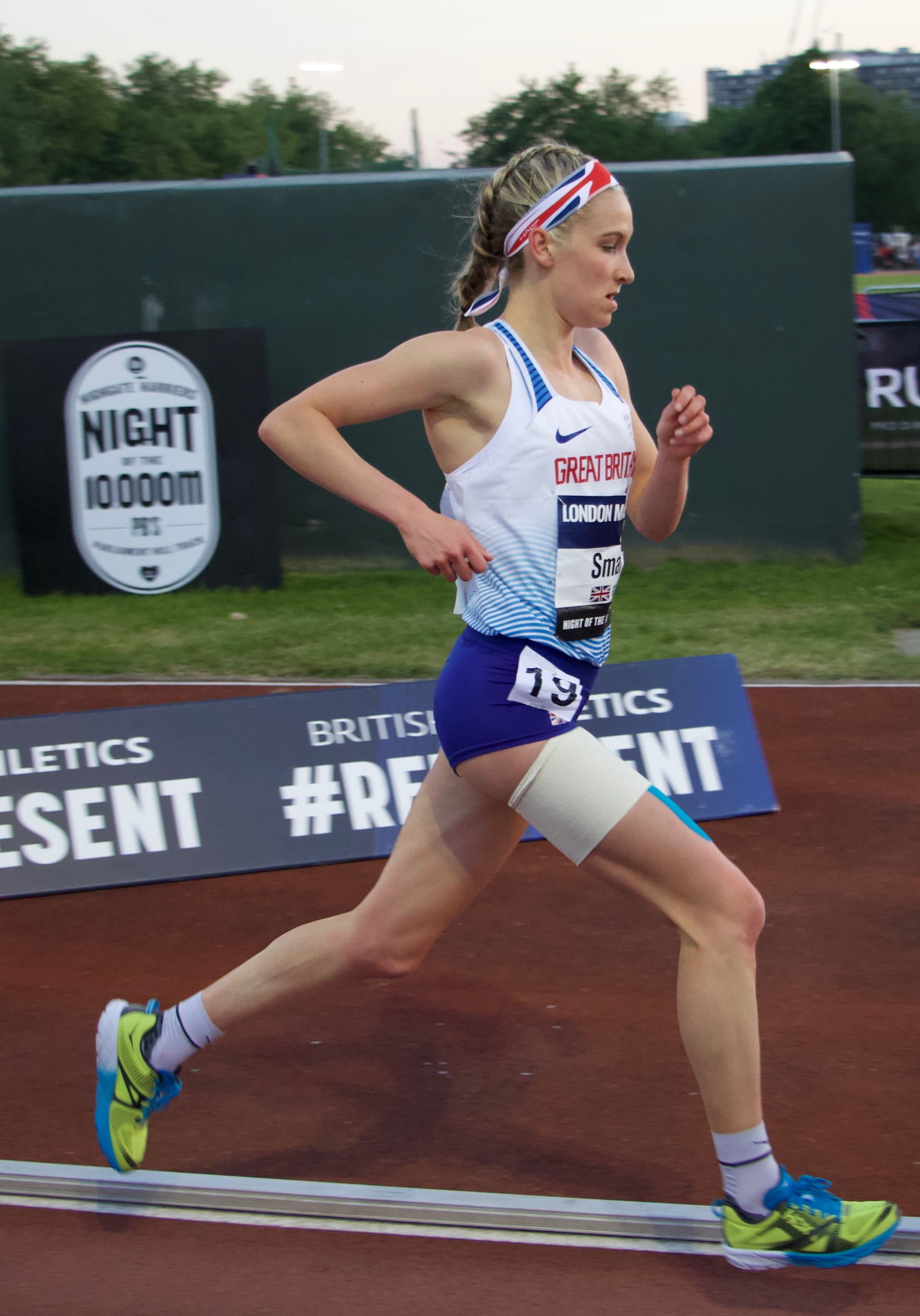
Louise Small 2018 European 10,000m Cup

Louise Small (born 27 March 1992) is a British long-distance runner.

She is a life member of Aldershot, Farnham And District Athletic Club. She has been coached by Mick Woods since she first joined in 2006

In 2007, age 15, she competed for Great Britain at the IAAF World Youth Championships.

In 2008, Small was selected to join On Camp with Kelly, a mentoring and education program set up by Dame Kelly Holmes for aspiring young athletes.

Small is an alumna of St Mary's University where she attained a BSc in Sports Coaching Science followed by a PGCE in Primary Education and finally a Masters in Pedagogical Leadership in Physical Education and Sport

Small is currently sponsored by sports company Hoka and was previously sponsored by Nike

== GB & NI Representations ==
Date	Competition	Event	Venue	Position
U17/Juniors				
11/07/2007	2007 IAAF World Youth Championships	1500m	Ostrava, Czech Republic	6th H1
01/02/2009	Cross Country Junior International	XC	Lisbon, Portugal	GOLD
28/03/2009	2009 IAAF World Cross Country Championships	XC	Amman, Jordan	34th
11/07/2009	2009 IAAF World Youth Championships	1500m	Bressanone-Brixen, Italy	5th
25/07/2009	2009 European Junior Championships	3000m	Novi-Sad, Serbia	BRONZE
20/03/2011	2011 IAAF World Cross Country Championships	XC	Punta Umbria, Spain	29th
22/05/2011	Loughborough International	3000m	Loughborough, UK	16th
Seniors				
14/04/2012	World University Cross Country Championships	XC	Lodz, Poland	56th
06/06/2016	European 10000m cup	10000m	Mersin, Turkey	12th
26/03/2017	2017 IAAF World Cross Country Championships	XC	Kampala, Uganda	38th
10/06/2017	European 10000m cup	10000m	Minsk, Belarus	16th
27/08/2017	2017 Summer Universiade	5000m/10000m	Taipei, Taiwan.	4th / 10th
19/05/2018	European 10000m cup	10000m	London, UK	7th

== Domestic competition highlights ==
Date	Competition		Venue	Position
U17/Juniors				
26/08/2007	UK School Games	1500m	Coventry	BRONZE
08/03/2008	Sainsbury ESAA English Schools' Championships - cross country	XC	Liverpool	SILVER
28/03/2008	SIAB International Schools' Cross Country Championships	XC	Perth	SILVER
13/04/2008	London Mini Marathon	Road	London	GOLD
23/12/2008	National Cross Country Championships	XC	Alton Towers	BRONZE
26/04/2009	London Mini Marathon	Road	London	SILVER
21/02/2009	National Cross Country Championships	XC	Parliament Hill	GOLD
19/02/2011	National Cross Country Championships	XC	Alton Towers	BRONZE
01/05/2011	BUCS Championships	10000m	Bedford	GOLD
02/05/2011	BUCS Championships	5000m	Bedford	GOLD
04/02/2012	BUCS Cross Country Championships	XC	Cardiff	SILVER
Seniors				
21/02/2015	National Cross Country Championships	XC	Parliament Hill	SILVER
25/02/2017	National Cross Country Championships	XC	Nottingham	SILVER
24/02/2018	National Cross Country Championships	XC	Parliament Hill	SILVER
19/05/2018	Night of the 10,000m PB's (inc British Champs & European Cup )	10000m	Parliament Hill	BRONZE
17/03/2019	Reading Half Marathon	Road	Reading	SILVER

Small has six Senior Women's titles competing at the Hampshire Cross Country Championships, 2014, 2016, 2017, 2018, 2019, 2022.

== Personal bests ==
Event	Time	Venue	Date
800m	2:09	Stevenage	7 June 2009
1500m	4:20	Watford	27 July 2016
3000m	9:07	Watford	6 September 2017
5000m	15:40	Catford	14 September 2017
10000m	32:34	London	19 May 2018
5K Road	15:44	Guernsey	3 April 2026
10k Road	33:20	Warsaw	22 April 2018
Half Marathon	70:19	Barcelona	15 February 2026
Marathon	2:27:48	Amsterdam Marathon	19 October 2025
