= Rebecca Lonedo =

Italian long-distance runner (born 1996)

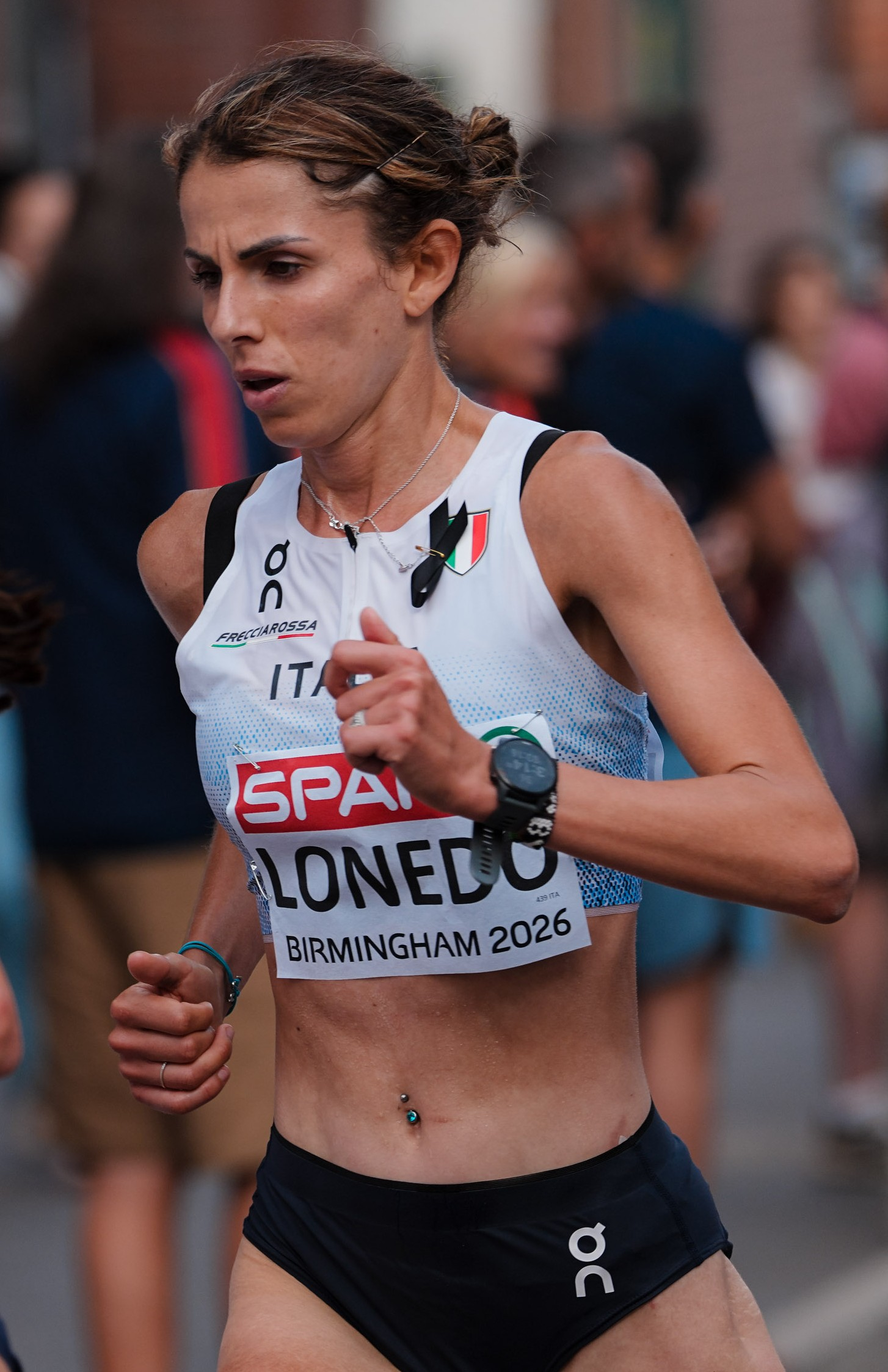
- Competing in 2026

Personal information
- Born: 5 December 1996 (age 29)

Sport
- Sport: Athletics
- Event: Long-distance running
Medal record
Women's athletics
Representing Italy
European Athletics Championships
| Silver medal – second place | 2026 Birmingham | Marathon team |
European Running Championships
| Silver medal – second place | 2025 Leuven | Marathon team |

Rebecca Lonedo (born 5 December 1996) is an Italian long-distance runner.

== Biography ==
Born in Arzignano, she participated in dance and swimming before discovering athletics through cross-country races at school. She had a third place finish in her age-group at the 2013 Italian cross-country championship. In 2018, she won her first Italian title, with victory at the U23 level in the 10,000 metres on the track. In 2021, she began to be coached by Stefano Baldini, and that year made her half marathon debut. She was later coached by Massimo Magnani in Ferrara and is a member of Fiamme Oro.

Lonedo placed seventh in the individual marathon and won the silver medal in the team event with Italy at the 2025 European Running Championships in Belgium. She placed twentieth overall at the 2025 World Athletics Championships in Tokyo, running 2:33:40 for the marathon, only her second race at the distance. She improved her marathon times steadily with 2:28:42 at the Hamburg Marathon and 2:24:28 at the Seville Marathon in February 2026, just 75 seconds off the Italian record. On 16 August, she placed sixth in the individual race and won the silver medal with Italy in the women’s team marathon at the 2026 European Athletics Championships in Birmingham, England.
