= Parliament Hill, London =

Area of open parkland in the south-east corner of Hampstead Heath, London, England

Parliament Hill
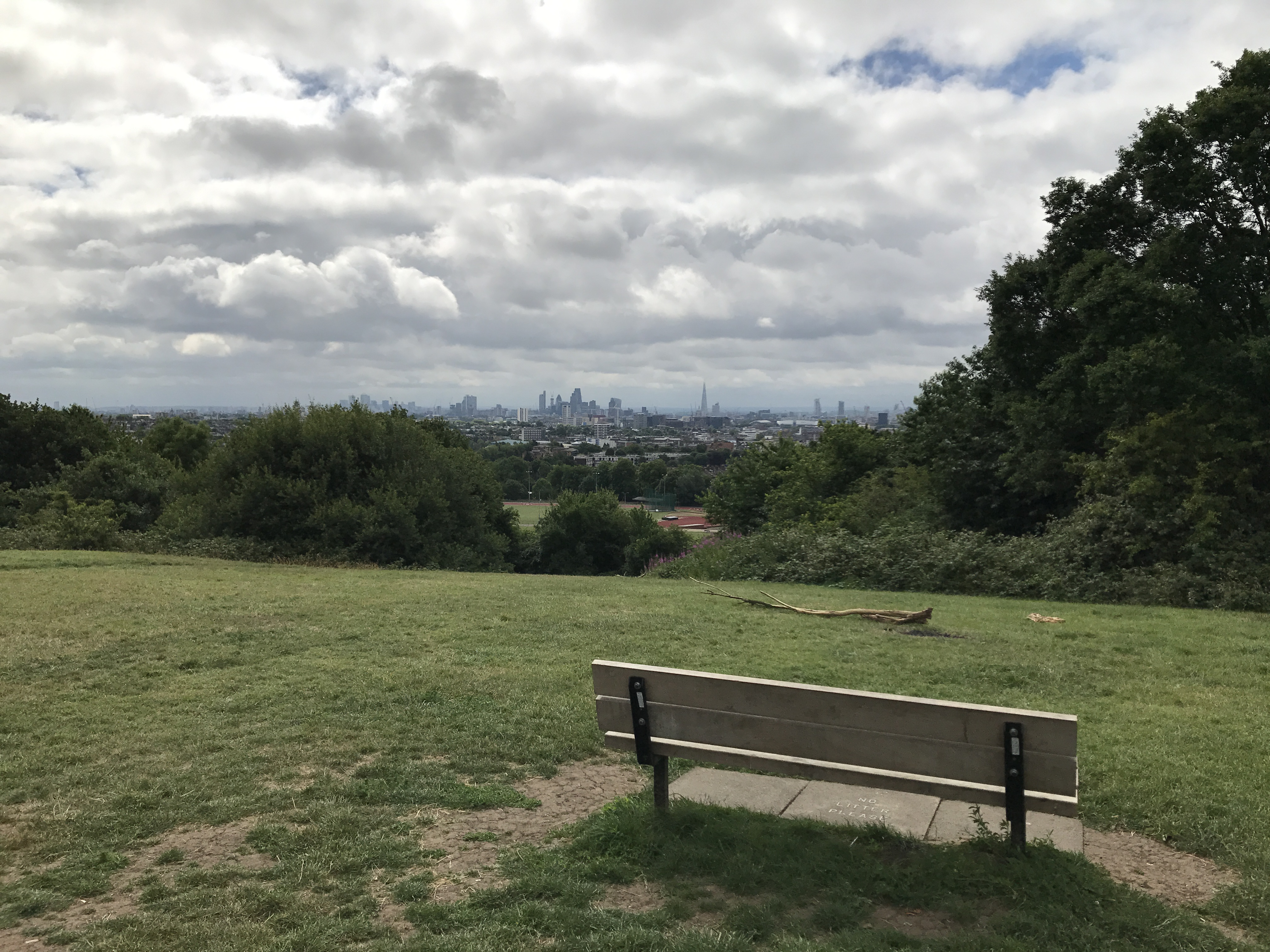
- View of Canary Wharf and the City of London from Parliament Hill (June 2017).
- Interactive map of Parliament Hill
- Type: Public park
- Location: Hampstead Heath, London
- Coordinates: 51°33′35″N 00°09′35″W
- Area: 932 acres (3.77 km^{2})
- Created: 1888
- Operator: City of London Corporation
- Status: All year

Audio description of the parkland by Shami Chakrabarti

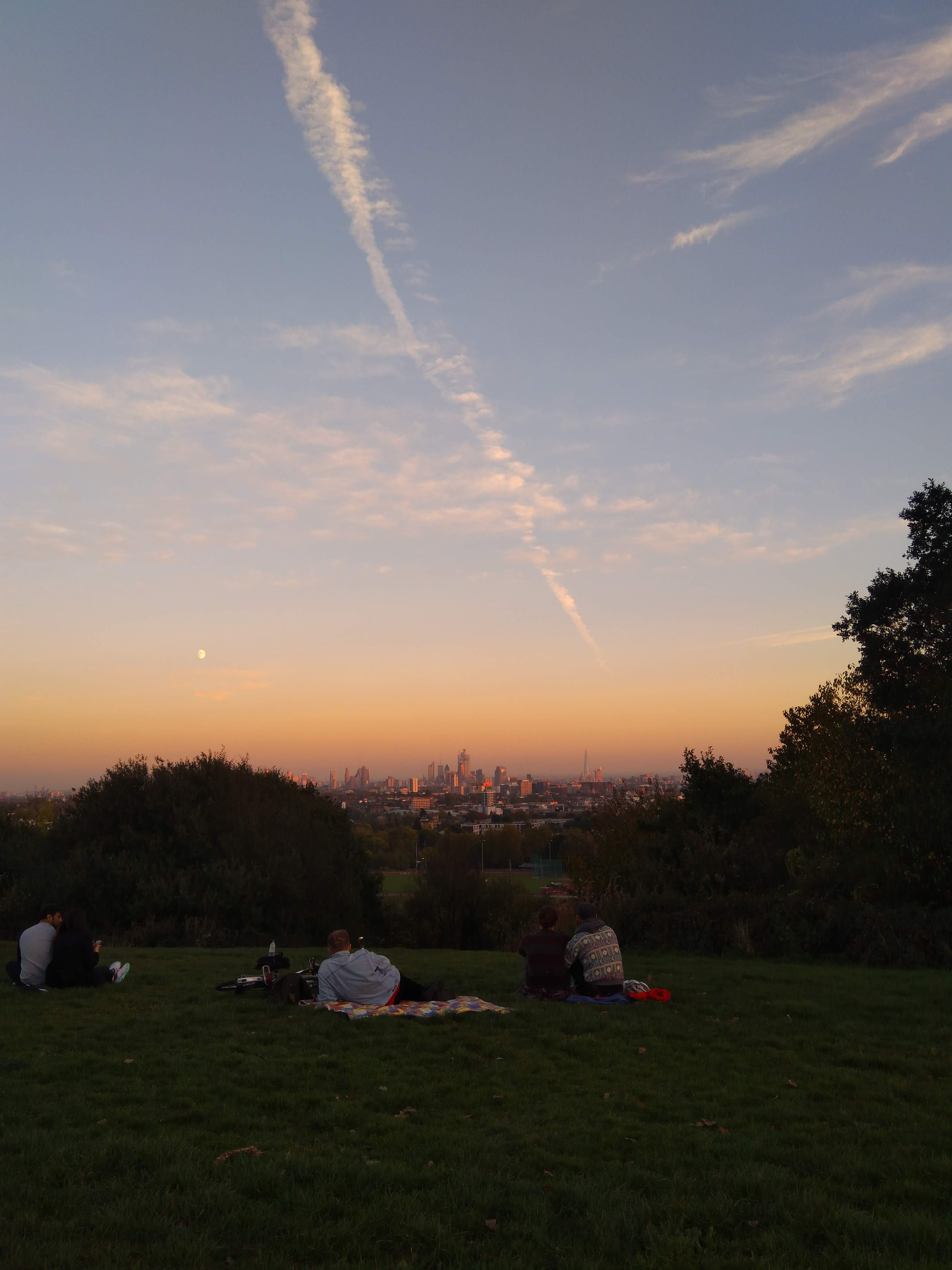
View of London from Parliament Hill during sunset, with 22 Bishopsgate under construction.

Parliament Hill is an area of open parkland in the south-east corner of Hampstead Heath in north-west London. The hill, which is 98 metres (322 ft) high, is notable for its views of the capital's skyline.

The Houses of Parliament, which are 6 1/4 miles (10.1 km) south of Parliament Hill in the City of Westminster, can be seen from the summit, although construction in the intermediate parts of London has partly obscured them.

== History ==
A mound on the hill may have been a Bronze Age burial barrow. In 1133, the hill was part of a manor that Henry I gave to a baron called Richard de Balta. During Henry II's reign it was passed to Alexander de Barentyn, the king's butler. A legend states that this was the site from where Guy Fawkes and Robert Catesby, of the Gunpowder Plot on November the 5th 1605, planned to watch the destruction of Parliament. The area that was known as Traitors' Hill may have acquired its current name during the English Civil War in the 17th century, when it was occupied by troops loyal to the English Parliament.

Over time, plots of land in the manor were sold off for building, particularly in the early 19th century, though the hill remained mainly common land. In 1875 Hampstead Heath was acquired for the people by the Metropolitan Board of Works. Thirteen years later Parliament Hill was purchased for the public for £300,000 and added to Hampstead Heath.

Kite Flyer on Parliament Hill, St Michael's Highgate in the background (February 2008)

Nevertheless, manorial rights to the land remained in private hands until the mid 20th century when they lapsed under Sir Spencer Pocklington Maryon-Wilson, who died in 1944, when the titular estate was passed on to his grandson Shane Gough, 5th Viscount Gough. Until the 1940s, livestock was still reared on the hill to be sold through Smithfields, the London meat market.

The City of London Corporation has managed Parliament Hill since 1989. Before that it was managed by the GLC and then Camden Council.

== Local area ==
It is administered by the City of London Corporation together with the rest of Hampstead Heath. The Eastern (Highgate) side, including Parliament Hill Lido, is known as Parliament Hill Fields, and a local girls' school, Parliament Hill School, is named after it.

== Activities ==
=== Cross-country running ===
Parliament Hill is renowned as a cross-country running venue and hosted the 1957, 1961, 1965, 1969, 1973, 1977, 1981, 1993 and 2003 men's English National Cross Country Championships and the 2006, 2009, 2012, 2015, 2018, 2022 and 2025 men's and women's English National Cross Country Championships.

=== Hampstead Rugby Club ===
The Hill is also used by Hampstead Rugby Club. The senior men's and women's teams train in the middle of the running track and on parts of the hill. The men's section is one of the oldest in the world.

== In film, literature, art and the media ==
Scenes in films:

- The Wedding Date – 2005
- Notes on a Scandal – 2006
- Run Fatboy Run – 2007
- Before I Go to Sleep – 2014
- Absolutely Anything – 2015
- Allied – 2016
- Eternals – 2021
- Kraven the Hunter – 2024
- Picture This – 2025

Scenes in television:

- Skins Pure (Part 1) – 2013
- Turn Up Charlie – 2019

Scenes in literature:

- Adamson, E.V. Five Strangers – 2021

== See also ==
Canada

- Parliament Hill, Ottawa
- Parliament Hill (Quebec City)

China

- Government Hill, Hong Kong
