= Cantell School =

Secondary school in Southampton, England

Coordinates: 50.9415°N 1.39874°W

Location
- Violet Road; Southampton, Hampshire, SO16 3GJ; England

Information
- Former name: Cantell Mathematics and Computing College
- Type: Foundation school
- Established: 1986
- Local authority: Southampton
- Trust: Aspire Community Trust
- Department for Education URN: 116469 Tables
- Ofsted: Reports
- Head teacher: Harry Kutty
- Age: 11 to 16
- Enrolment: 1300
- Classes: Art, Computer Science, iMedia (GCSE exclusive), English (Both English language and literature for GCSE), Languages (French, Spanish, Latin, any notable modern language (GCSE exclusive)), Music, Science (Chemistry, Physics, Biology), Child Development (GCSE exclusive), Design and Technology ( includes Food Technology/ Cookery), Hair and Beauty (GCSE exclusive), Mathematics, Physical Education, Statistics (GCSE exclusive), CPSD (Citizenship, Personal and Social Development) (KS3 exclusive), Drama, Business (GCSE exclusive), History, Geography, Religious Education, Travel and Tourism (GCSE exclusive), Media Studies (GCSE exclusive), Photography (GCSE exclusive), Textiles (GCSE exclusive)
- Website: http://www.cantell.co.uk

Cantell School is a secondary comprehensive and co-educational school located in Bassett, Southampton, near the Glen Eyre Halls and city centre. In 2024, Ofsted judged Cantell as an 'Outstanding' school.

== History ==
=== Pre-1986 ===
Before being known as Cantell School, it was originally two separate schools – Glen Eyre and Hampton Park Secondary School.

Hampton Park Secondary School was a mixed comprehensive school founded in 1929 and would later go defunct in 1972. It was located nearby to Glen Eyre School. Glen Eyre School was a comprehensive school founded in 1962. Glen Eyre would segregate its pupils into separate sections for males and females, each one with their staff. However, in 1967, these two areas would merge into one mixed school.

In the early 1980s, it was decided that the resources of Hampton Park Secondary School be merged with the site of Glen Eyre School.

=== 1986–2016 ===
The school was opened by Gordon Higginson on 17 December 1986, with its first headteacher being Mr P. Robinson.

The school occupies the site that was previously home to Glen Eyre School. In 1988, the school occupied an area of approximately 4 hectares (9.9 acres) and it was proposed that 0.1 hectares (0.25 acres) of this be sold off for housing.

The School gained specialist status for Mathematics and Information and Communication Technology, in September 2003 and was known as Cantell Mathematics and Computing College until 2013, when the school returned to the original name of Cantell School. Along with the specialist status, the main school building was completed in 2003, replacing the previous East and West buildings which were constructed in the 1940s for Glen Eyre School, and which were in a state of disrepair. The school's sports hall along with a small electricity substation were the only parts of the old school to survive the rebuild.

In September 2004, the school received an OFSTED inspection, announced just before the new headteacher, Ruth Johnson, took up her post, and which took place just three weeks into her headship. This inspection placed the school in the special measures category. As a result, the school began to receive visits from Her Majesty's Inspectorate of Education to inspect their progress.

Despite facing significant criticisms and challenges, the general consensus was that Johnson considerably improved the school, as it was under her leadership that the school left special measures category.

In 2008, the year Ms. Ruth Evans became headteacher, the school achieved improvements in Ofsted judgements, and in 2013, achieved its best ever GCSE results at the time (69% 5A*-C including English and Maths), and topped the City league tables for students' progress (Value Added). In the same year, the school was judged 'Good'.

==== List of Headteachers ====
Mr. P. Robinson (1986–1990)

Mr. David Burge (1990–2004)

Mrs. Ruth Johnson (2004–2008)

Ms. Ruth Evans (2008–2016)

Mr. Harry Kutty (2016-)

=== Present ===
Modern-day Cantell school serves as a diverse student body, being a School of Sanctuary since 2018. It offers over 70 different clubs and societies in many different areas including sports, arts, academic and support. It is also one of the only schools in Hampshire to offer Latin as part of the timetable.

The school also maintains strong partnerships with local authorities and businesses, such as the University of Southampton, NatWest, Hampshire Cricket and many others. The school participates in various competitions and events. The school also engages in community service and fundraising activities. Notable events include participation in Children in Need, Anti-Bullying Week, and World Mental Health Day. Additionally, Cantell organizes unique student experiences like the Year 7 New Forest survival day and Fine Dining events and many trips specific to subjects.

Cantell has begun to integrate modern technology into its curriculum, utilizing interactive whiteboards and online learning platforms. Comprehensive student support services, including counselling, special education programs, and career guidance, were put in place to ensure the well-being and future success of its students. The school also actively involves parents and the community through regular communication, parent-teacher associations, and community events.

==== Facilities ====
On the bottom-most floor (Floor 0), the main cafeteria is found. The student support services and reception can be found here, along with the support hub. The music classes and some toilets can also be found on this floor.

The first floor (Floor 1) is where the student entrance is. Inside is a small cafeteria and Year 11 common room, along with the Humanities corridor. The corridor contains classes for geography, History, religious education and politics. Turning left will bring you to the technology corridor, where cooking, design and technology and business studies can be found. On the right the headteacher's office and staff rooms can be found, and eventually the art corridor too. It contains all creative subjects, including drama/theatre, art and dance.

On the second floor (Floor 2), the English corridor, language corridor, and medical and other support rooms can be found. Along with these, three IT rooms and two science rooms are present too.

On the top floor (Floor 3), the Ruth Evans Resource centre can be found. It acts as the school library. Opposite to it, the mathematics corridor is found. To its left is the science corridor and to its right is the Wellbeing Hub, another place for students to go if they need help.

There are four main areas for students to socialise and go to – the upper canopy, centre canopy (also known as the courtyard), lower canopy, and activity fields. The upper canopy is a recent edition, being constructed during COVID-19. It is mainly Key Stage 4 exclusive, and is located in between the technology and humanities corridors. The centre canopy is a small area, containing in the middle a series of four platforms, arranged in a similar way to Greek theatrons. The lower canopy, or main canopy, is a large tent area. It contains a few ping pong tables and several benches. The 4th area, the activity fields, is a collective term for all three areas where team sports, such as football or basketball, can be played. It includes the hardcourt, a large concrete pitch fitted with tennis nets and basketball hoops and acts as an overflow parking lot; an "Astro", a large football pitch with artificial turf; and the field, a vast, open area where any other a sports or activities can be played.

These four areas are also used for most outdoor PE lessons. However, indoor PE lessons utilise, the Sports Hall, a multi-purpose hall, where basketball, dodgeball, badminton and other sports can be played, as well where some assemblies are held and exams are sat; a small hall, which serves the same functions as the Sports hall, but is only used if multiple PE lessons occur at the same time; and a small gym/fitness room.

== Notable former pupils ==
- Will Champion, drummer for Coldplay
- Joe Jerome Newman, lead singer of alt-J and amateur boxer
- Wade Elliott, footballer
- Sam Hoskins, footballer
- Louisa Rose Allen, singer and songwriter
- Mahamed Mahamed, Olympic athlete
- Nicky Banger, footballer
