= Nóra Szabó =

Hungarian long-distance runner (born 1988)

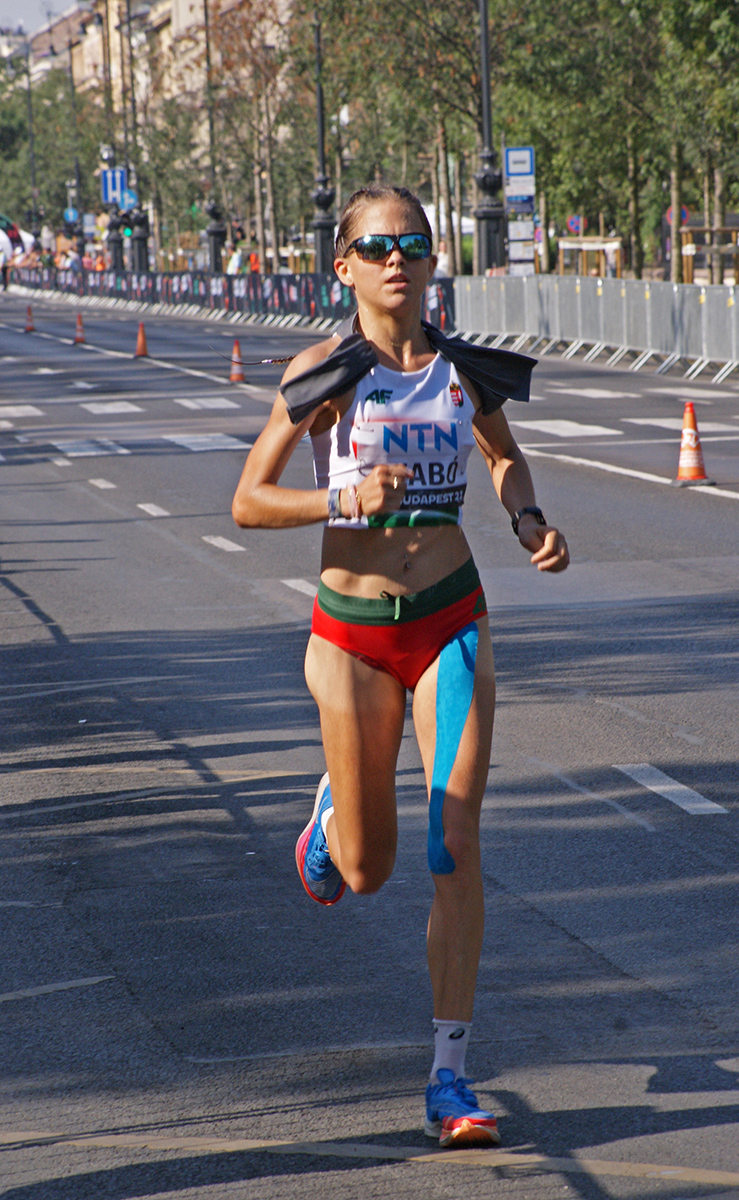
- Competing in 2023

Personal information
- Born: 1 March 1988 (age 38)

Sport
- Sport: Athletics
- Event: Long-distance running

Nóra Szabó (born 1 March 1988) is a Hungarian long-distance runner. She is the national record holder in the marathon.

== Biography ==
Szabó started running relatively late, at the age of 23 years-old, in 2011. Running as an amateur, she ran 2:50 at the Frankfurt Marathon in 2017, and was encouraged to take the sport more seriously. She began to train with the coach Imre Berkovics from October 2019.

A member of Margitsziget Athletics Club, Szabo set a new Hungarian national record in the marathon with 2:28:25 on 19 February 2023 in Seville, Spain, breaking Judit Földing-Nagy’s Hungarian record of 2:28:50 set in 1996 by 25 seconds. She placed seventeenth with 2:34:39 at the 2022 European Athletics Championships in Munich.

In August 2023, Szabo placed twenty fourth at the 2023 World Athletics Championships in Budapest in the women's marathon, running 2:33:38. On 29 September 2024, she broke her own National record at the Berlin Marathon, running a time of 2:27:31. Later that year, Szabó ran 2:25:52 on 1 December 2024 at the Valencia Marathon to improve the national record further. She placed fifteenth overall at the 2025 World Athletics Championships in Tokyo, running 2:31:41 for the marathon.

On 16 August 2026, she placed fourth in the marathon at the 2026 European Athletics Championships in Birmingham, England, running 2:27:39.

== Personal life ==
She studied psychology at Pázmány Péter Catholic University.
