= Rose Harvey =

British athlete

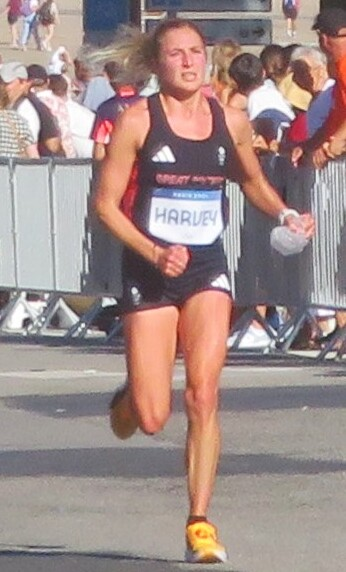
- Harvey in 2024

Personal information
- Nationality: Great Britain
- Born: 25 August 1992 (age 33)

Sport
- Sport: Athletics
- Event: Marathon

Achievements and titles
- Personal bests: Marathon: 2:23:21 (Chicago, 2023)
Medal record
Women's athletics
Representing Great Britain
European Athletics Championships
Gold medal – first place	2026 Birmingham	Marathon team

Rose Harvey (born 25 August 1992) is a British long-distance runner. In 2023, she became the fifth fastest British female marathon runner of all time. She competed at the 2024 Olympic Games and won a team gold in the women's marathon at the 2026 European Athletics Championships.

== Early life ==
She grew up in Evesham. From 2003, Harvey attended King's School, Worcester and also attended Malvern College for her Sixth Form studies.

== Career ==
Harvey moved to London in 2015 and joined the Clapham Chasers running club. She was employed as a corporate lawyer prior to being made redundant during the COVID-19 pandemic. She initially began training for a half-Ironman, but focused purely on running and in April 2021 ran 2:31:14 at the Cheshire Marathon.

In October 2021, she ran 2:29:45 in the London Marathon placing 15th, followed by running 2:27:17 at the Seville Marathon in February 2022. She made her major championship debut at the 2022 World Athletics Championships held in Eugene, Oregon. In October 2022, she finished the London Marathon in 10th place as the fastest British woman in a time of 2:27:58.

In October 2023, Harvey ran a new personal best time of 2:23:21 to finish ninth at the Chicago Marathon. The time also met the qualifying mark for the upcoming Olympics and placed her as the fifth fastest all-time British female marathon runner. On 26 April 2024, she was selected by British Athletics for the 2024 Summer Olympics in Paris where she finished 78th in a time of 2:51:03, despite starting the race with a stress fracture in her femur.

Running at the 2025 London Marathon Harvey placed ninth in a time of 2:25:01, and was the second British woman to finish, after Eilish McColgan, who placed eighth.

Harvey was again the second Brit to finish behind McColgan, running a time of 2:26:14 for another ninth place finish at the 2026 London Marathon. On 16 August, Harvey placed fourteenth in 2:30:34 in the marathon at the 2026 European Championships in Birmingham, which helped Great Britain win team gold.
