= Sofiia Yaremchuk =

Italian long-distance runner

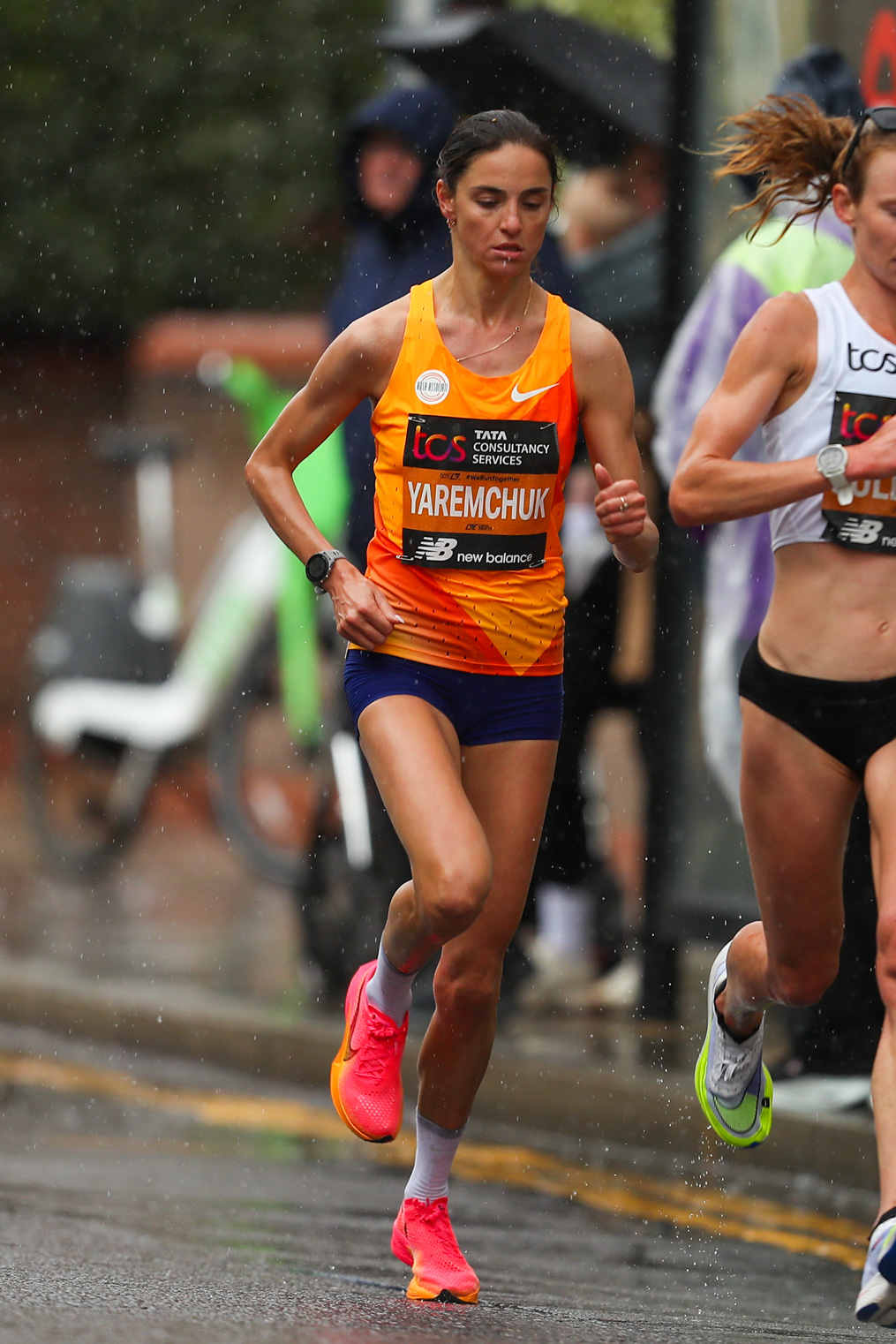
- Yaremchuk in 2023

Personal information
- National team: Italy
- Born: 3 June 1994 (age 32) Lviv, Ukraine
- Home town: Cornelia, Rome
- Height: 1.70 m (5 ft 7 in)
- Weight: 49 kg (108 lb)

Sport
- Country: Italy
- Sport: Long-distance running
- Club: C.S. Esercito
- Coached by: Fabio Martelli

Achievements and titles
- Personal bests: 10 km: 32:06 (2021); Half marathon: 1:09:09 (2022); Marathon: 2:23:16 (2023)
Medal record
Women's athletics
Representing Italy
European Athletics Championships
| Silver medal – second place | 2026 Birmingham | Marathon team |

Sofiia Yaremchuk (Ukrainian: Софія Яремчук; born 3 June 1994) is a Ukrainian-born Italian long-distance runner.

== Career ==
She competed in the women's half marathon at the 2018 IAAF World Half Marathon Championships held in Valencia, Spain. She finished in 71st place. In 2020, she competed in the women's half marathon at the World Athletics Half Marathon Championships held in Gdynia, Poland.

== Achievements ==
| Year | Competition | Venue | Rank | Event | Time | Notes |
Representing Ukraine
| 2018 | Half Marathon World Championships | (Spain) Valencia | 71st | Half marathon | 1:15:27 | SB |
| 2020 | Half Marathon World Championships | (Poland) Gdynia | 25th | Half marathon | 1:10:42 | |
Representing Italy
| 2021 | Venice Marathon | (Italy) Venice | 1st | Marathon | 2:29:12 | |
| 2025 | London Marathon | (United Kingdom) London | 7th | Marathon | 2:23:14 | PB |

== National titles ==
Yaremchuk won three national championships at individual senior level.

- Italian Athletics Championships
  - Half marathon: 2022
- Italian 10 km road Championship
  - 10 km road: 2021, 2022

== See also ==
- Italian all-time lists - Half marathon
