= Natasha Cockram =

Welsh marathon runner (born 1992)

Personal information
- Nationality: Welsh
- Born: 12 November 1992 (age 33)
- Home town: Cwmbran, Wales
- Education: University of Tulsa

Sport
- Sport: Marathon running
Medal record
Women's athletics
Representing Great Britain
European Athletics Championships
Gold medal – first place	2026 Birmingham	Marathon team

Natasha Cockram (born 12 November 1992) is a Welsh marathon runner. She won a gold medal in the women's marathon team event at the 2026 European Championships.

== Early life ==
Cockram is from Cwmbran, Wales.

She attended Croesyceiliog Comprehensive before deciding to attend the University of Tulsa in Oklahoma, United States from 2012 to 2015, competing in cross country. She was accepted into the medical school at the University of South Carolina, but declined the place to focus on running.

== Running ==
In 2018, Cockram came first in the women's category of the inaugural 2018 Newport Marathon with a time of 02:44:58.

In 2019, Cockram finished fifth in the Dublin Marathon, setting a new Welsh women's record with a time of 02:30:50. The previous record was held by Susan Tooby with a time of 02:31:33 at the 1988 Summer Olympics. This was despite a horse kicking her on the eve of the race.

Cockram finished 13th in the 2020 London Marathon, with a time of 02:33:19, 3 minutes and 49 seconds outside of the qualifying time for the Olympic Games. She was the top finishing Briton at the race. She came second at the 2020 Olympics marathon trial, slower than the Olympic qualifying time. In June 2021, UK Athletics published its list of athletes for the delayed 2020 Summer Olympics, and Cockram was not selected.

In 2021, Cockram won the Norwich Half Marathon, with a time of 01:16:31. She won the Los Angeles Marathon on 7 November 2021, with a time of 02:33:17.

In December 2022 Cockram ran 2:26:14 at the Valencia Marathon, placing her eleventh on the all-time British list.

At the 2026 European Championships in Birmingham, she finished fifth in a time of 2:27:54 to help Great Britain win the women's team gold medal.

== Personal life ==
In 2020, Cockram moved to Norfolk, England.
