= List of Arabs in Italy =

This is a list of Arabs in Italy. It includes prominent and notable Arabs in Italy from various fields, such as business, science, entertainment, sports and fine arts.

== Arts and entertainment ==
=== Actors and models ===
- Adam Alexi-Malle (born 1964), actor, singer, dancer and musician
- Jonis Bascir (born 1960), actor and musician
- Rym Saidi Breidy (born 1986), topmodel and actress
- Afef Jnifen (born 1963), fashion model
- Margareth Madè (born 1982), model and actress

=== Musicians ===
- Ghali Amdouni (born 1993), rapper
- Saba Anglana (born 1970), singer
- Malika Ayane (born 1984), singer
- Yusef Greiss (1899–1961), composer of classical music
- Ion (Omar Nguale Ilunga) (born 1984), rapper
- Amir Issaa (born 1978), rapper
- Nour-Eddine Lakhmari (born 1964), singer, choreographer and film director
- Alessandro Mahmoud (born 1992), singer
- Rancore (born 1989), rapper

=== Other ===
- Jaber Alwan (born 1948), artist and painter
- Luca Guadagnino (born 1971), film director, producer, and screenwriter
- Fathi Hassan (born 1957), artist
- Omar Hassan (born 1987), artist
- Jamal Taslaq (born 1970), high-fashion designer

== Literature ==
- Cristina Ali Farah (born 1973), writer
- Randa Ghazy (born 1986), writer
- Tahar Lamri (born 1958), writer
- Ingy Mubiayi (born 1972), writer

== Media and journalism ==
- Rula Jebreal (born 1973), foreign policy analyst, journalist, novelist and screenwriter
- Amara Lakhous (born 1970), author, journalist and anthropologist
- Nahida Nakad (born 1960), TV reporter and journalist
- Michelle Nouri (born 1973), journalist and author
- Igiaba Scego (born 1974), journalist, writer
- Mohamed Zineddaine (born 1957), journalist

== Politics ==
- Magdi Allam (born 1952), journalist and politician
- Abdul Hadi Palazzi (born 1961), secretary general of the Italian Muslim Assembly
- Souad Sbai (born 1961), politician and writer
- Dacia Valent (1963–2015), politician

== Sports ==
=== Association football ===
- Ramzi Aya (born 1990), footballer
- Richard Basha (born 2002), footballer
- Salah Basha (born 2003), footballer
- Nebil Caidi (born 1988), footballer
- Walid Cheddira (born 1998), footballer
- Fahd El Bahja (born 1993), footballer
- Hamza El Kaouakibi (born 1998), footballer
- Badr El Ouazni (born 1991), footballer
- Stephan El Shaarawy (born 1992), footballer
- Yassine Ejjaki (born 1999), footballer
- Housem Ferchichi (born 1996), footballer
- Amine Ghazoini (born 2001), footballer
- Shadi Ghosheh (born 1987), footballer
- Yonese Hanine (born 1990), footballer
- Hamza Haoudi (born 2001), footballer
- Saber Hraiech (born 1995), footballer
- Hicham Kanis (born 1997), footballer
- Omar Khailoti (born 2001), footballer
- Jonis Khoris (born 1989), footballer
- Karim Laribi (born 1991), footballer
- Fabio Liverani (born 1976), football manager and former midfielder
- Amir Mahrous (born 1998), footballer
- Youssef Maleh (born 1998), footballer
- Adam Masina (born 1994), footballer
- Hachim Mastour (born 1998), footballer
- Shady Oukhadda (born 1999), footballer

=== Running ===
- Ahmed Abdelwahed (born 1996), steeplechase runner
- Yassin Bouih (born 1996), middle-distance runner
- Migidio Bourifa (born 1969), long-distance runner
- Yassine El Fathaoui (born 1982), long-distance runner
- Ahmed El Mazoury (born 1990), long-distance runner
- Nadia Ejjafini (born 1977), long-distance runner
- Mostafa Errebbah (born 1971), long-distance runner
- Abdellah Haidane (born 1989), middle distance runner
- Dalia Kaddari (born 2001), sprinter
- Mohamed Laqouahi (born 1978), long-distance runner
- Fatna Maraoui (born 1977), long-distance runner
- Yassine Rachik (born 1993), long-distance runner
- Marouan Razine (born 1991), long-distance runner
- Ashraf Saber (born 1973), athlete
- Najibe Salami (born 1985), long-distance runner
- Touria Samiri (born 1988), middle distance runner and steeplechase runner
- Laila Soufyane (born 1983), long-distance runner
- Ala Zoghlami (born 1994), middle-distance runner and steeplechaser
- Osama Zoghlami (born 1994), middle-distance runner and steeplechaser

=== Other ===
- Iosra Abdelaziz (born 1999), artistic gymnast
- Zahra Bani (born 1989), javelin thrower
- Mustapha Haida (born 1988), Muay Thai kickboxer
- Mohamed Amine Kalem (born 1982), para table tennis player
- Alessio Sakara (born 1981), MMA fighter

== Other ==
- Simone Assemani (1752–1820), professor of Oriental languages in Padua
- Ali Ghaleb Himmat (born 1938), businessman
- Giuseppe Nahmad (1932–2012), art dealer

== See also ==
- List of Arab Americans
