= 2008 Italian Athletics Championships =

- Dates: 18–20 July
- Host city: Cagliari
- Level: Senior
- Events: 44

The 2008 Italian Athletics Championships was the 98th edition of the Italian Athletics Championships and were held in Cagliari.

== Men ==
Event	Gold		Silver		Bronze	
100 m	Fabio Cerutti	10"21	Jacques Riparelli	10"29	Simone Collio	10"31
200 m	Matteo Galvan	20"97	Alessandro Guazzi	21"08	Diego Marani	21"19
400 m	Andrea Barberi; Luca Galletti	46"93	-		Teo Turchi	47"29
800 m	Livio Sciandra	1'48"43	Dario Ceccarelli	1'51"50	Giovanni Bellino	1'51"82
1500 m	Lukas Rifeser	3'45"65	Najibe Marco Salami	3'45"72	Fabio Lettieri	3'46"11
5000 m	Daniele Meucci	14'12"28	Stefano La Rosa	14'13"44	Domenico Ricatti	14'20"08
10,000 m	Stefano La Rosa	29'52"95	Daniele Meucci	29'52"96	Domenico Ricatti	30'27"42
3000 m steeplechase	Yuri Floriani	8'44"93	Angelo Iannelli	8'50"99	Berardino Chiarelli	8'53"58
110 m hs	Emanuele Abate	13"75	Andrea Alterio	13"87	Stefano Tedesco	14"17
400 m hs	Nicola Cascella	50"99	Claudio Citterio	51"62	Federico Rubeca	51"65
Racewalk 10,000 m	Ivano Brugnetti	39'12"33	Jean Jacques Nkouloukidi	40'14"57	Giorgio Rubino	41'13"11
4×100 m relay	Gruppo Sportivo Fiamme Oro	40"25	CS dell'Aeronautica Militare	41"07	Atletica Avis Macerata	41"56
4×400 m relay	Centro Sportivo Carabinieri	3'09"71	Atletica Cento Torri Pavia	3'11"12	Gruppo Sportivo Fiamme Oro	3'14"58
High jump	Filippo Campioli	2,25 m	Nicola Ciotti	2,25 m	Giulio Ciotti	2,21 m
Pole vault	Giorgio Piantella	5,20 m	Sergio D'Orio	5,00 m	Marco Boni	5,00 m
Long jump	Stefano Tremigliozzi	7,73 m	Ferdinando Iucolano	7,70 m	Nicola Trentin	7,66 m
Triple jump	Fabrizio Donato	16,37 m	Fabrizio Schembri	16,35 m	Michele Boni	15,77 m
Shot put	Paolo Capponi	19,27 m	Paolo Dal Soglio	18,62 m	Marco Di Maggio	18,51 m
Discus throw	Hannes Kirchler	61,09 m	Diego Fortuna	59,17 m	Giovanni Faloci	58,77 m
Hammer throw	Marco Lingua	78,13 m	Nicola Vizzoni	76,53 m	Pellegrino Delli Carri	70,00 m
Javelin throw	Roberto Bertolini	75,66 m	Leonardo Gottardo	70,12 m	Antonio Fent	70,04 m
Decathlon	Paolo Mottadelli	7215 p.	Lukas Lanthaler	6995 p.	Riccardo Palmieri	6902 p.

== Women ==
Event	Gold		Silver		Bronze	
100 m	Anita Pistone	11"45	Manuela Grillo	11"51	Martina Giovanetti	11"63
200 m	Vincenza Calì	23"10	Libania Grenot	23"45	Manuela Grillo	23"81
400 m	Daniela Reina	53"48	Marta Milani	53"75	Chiara Bazzoni	54"64
800 m	Elisa Cusma	2'03"59	Chiara Nichetti	2'05"54	Cristina Grange	2'07"73
1500 m	Maria Vittoria Fontanesi	4'19"18	Agnes Tschurtschenthaler	4'19"52	Valentina Costanza	4'20"12
5000 m	Elena Romagnolo	15'55"79	Adelina De Soccio	16'19"94	Rosaria Console	16'19"97
10,000 m	Rosaria Console	33'40"98	Gloria Marconi	34'08"21	Claudia Pinna	34'22"67
3000 m steeplechase	Emma Quaglia	10'07"48	Agnes Tschurtschenthaler	10'10"19	Micaela Bonessi	10'18"53
100 m hs	Micol Cattaneo	13"18	Marzia Caravelli	13"47	Marta Tomassetti	13"78
400 m hs	Benedetta Ceccarelli	56"88	Manuela Gentili	58"24	Monika Niederstaetter	58"38
Racewalk 5000 m	Sibilla Di Vincenzo	21'46"02	Valentina Trapletti	22'08"06	Gisella Orsini	22'32"85
4×100 m relay	Gruppo Sportivo Forestale	45"02	Centro sportivo olimpico dell'Esercito	45"99	ACSI Italia Atletica	46"25
4×400 m relay	Centro sportivo olimpico dell'Esercito	3'42"62	Assindustria Sport Padova	3'46"84	Italgest Athletic Club	3'47"19
High jump	Antonietta Di Martino	1,93 m	Raffaella Lamera	1,87 m	Valeria Marconi	1,83 m
Pole vault	Anna Giordano Bruno	4,35 m	Arianna Farfaletti Casali	4,30 m	Elena Scarpellini	4,20 m
Long jump	Tania Vicenzino	6,06 m	Elisa Zanei	6,01 m	Chiara Mancino	5,86 m
Triple jump	Magdelín Martínez	13,57 m	Silvia Cucchi	13,41 m	Federica De Santis	13,35 m
Shot put	Chiara Rosa	17,96 m	Assunta Legnante	17,53 m	Mara Rosolen	15,98 m
Discus throw	Laura Bordignon	57,25 m	Valentina Aniballi	56,02 m	Cristiana Checchi	53,33 m
Hammer throw	Clarissa Claretti	72,46 m	Silvia Salis	69,72 m	Ester Balassini	65,57 m
Javelin throw	Claudia Coslovich	57,47 m	Luana Picchianti	51,58 m	Silvia Carli	49,91 m
Heptathlon	Francesca Doveri	5673 p.	Elisa Trevisan	5606 p.	Elisa Bettini	5485 p.
