= 2010 Italian Athletics Indoor Championships =

- Dates: 27–28 February
- Host city: Ancona
- Venue: Palaindoor di Ancona
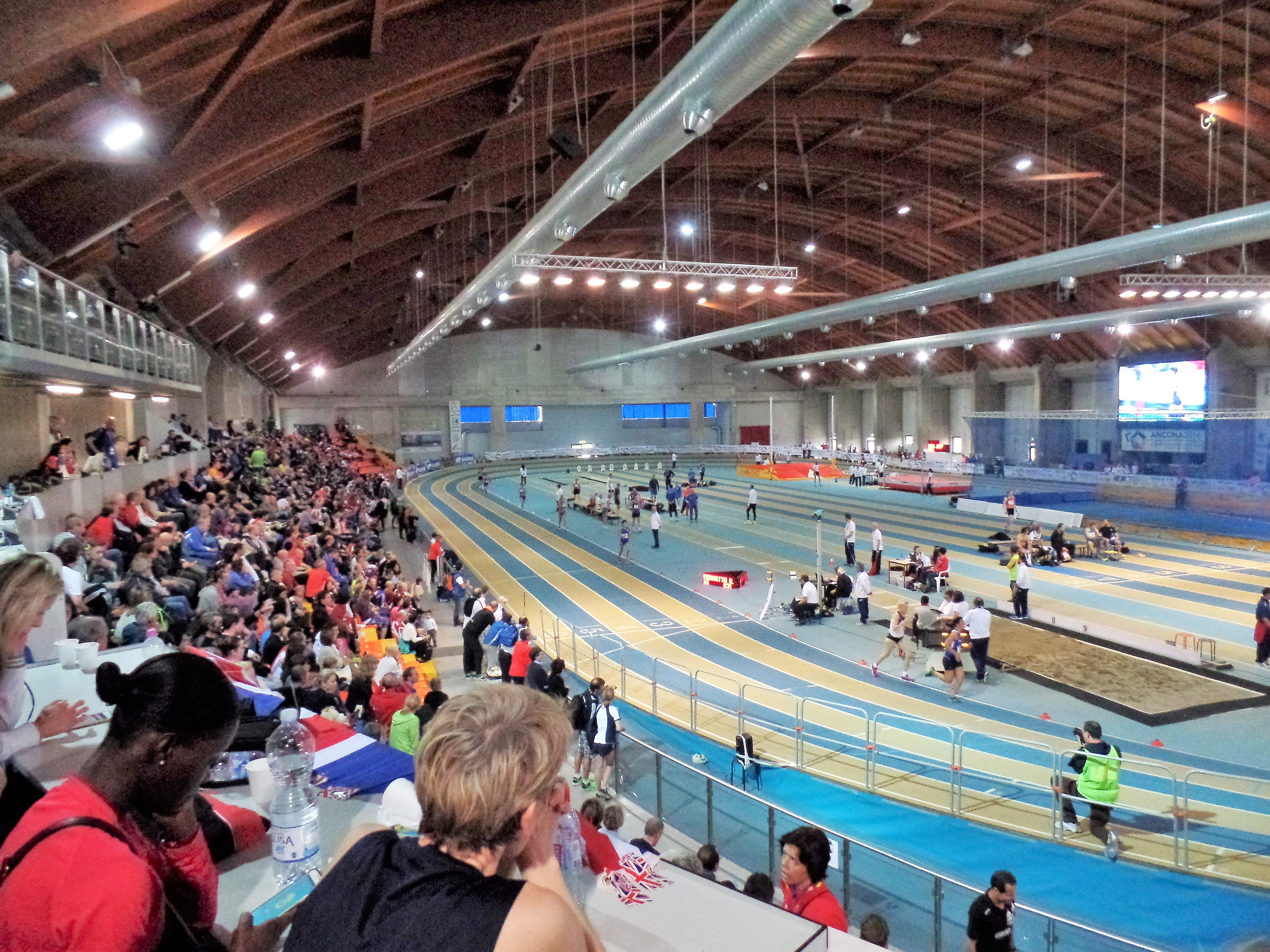
- Level: Senior
- Events: 24 + relays

2010 Italian Athletics Indoor Championships was the 41st edition of the Italian Athletics Indoor Championships and were held in Ancona.

== Champions ==
=== Men ===
Event	1st place	Performance	2nd place	Performance	3rd place	Performance
60 m	Jacques Riparelli	6.73	Giovanni Tomasicchio	6.76	Massimiliano Dentali	6.81
400 m	Domenico Fontana	47,70 PB	Isalbet Juarez	48.12 SB	Marco Perrone	48.69
800 m	Giordano Benedetti	1:48.65	Lukas Rifesser	1:49.96	Mohamed Moro	1:51,09
1500 m	Mario Scapini	3: 45,38	Stefano La Rosa	3: 46.02 PB	Gilio Iannone	3: 47.73 SB
3000 m	Christian Obrist	8:09.76	Stefano La Rosa	8:08.81	Simone Gariboldi	8:11.63
60 m hs	John Mark Nalocca	7.93 PB	Giorgio Berdini	8.03	Andrea Alterio	8.03 SB
4x1 lap relay	Aeronautica Militare; Alessandro Berdini; Enrico Minetto; Davide Manenti; Marco Moraglio	1:26.96	Atletica Firenze Marathon; Gaetano Barone; Arcangelo Morizio; Fabio Fedele; Samuele Mattei	1:29.01	Cento Torri Pavia; Diego Zuodar; Dorino Sirtoli; Roberto Severi; Walter Monti	1:30.24
Race walk 5000 m	Alex Schwazer	18:46.49	Jean Jacques Nkouloukidi	19:11.13	Daniele Paris	20:02.53
High jump	Giulio Ciotti	2.24	Andrea Bettinelli	2.24	Alessandro Talotti	2.21
Pole vault	Giorgio Piantella	5.40	Marco Boni	5.30 = PB	Matteo Rubbiani	5.25
Long jump	Stefano Tremigliozzi	7.65	Emanuele Formichetti	7.63 = PB	Michele Boni	7.62 PB
Triple jump	Fabrizio Donato	17.39	Fabrizio Schembri	16.55	Daniele Greco	16:15
Shot put	Marco Di Maggio	18.47	Daniele Secci	18.38	Paolo Dal Soglio	18.06

=== Women ===
Event	1st place	Performance	2nd place	Performance	3rd place	Performance
60 m	Maria Aurora Salvagno	7.37	Ilenia Draisci	7.44	Audrey Alloh	7.46
400 m	Marta Milani	53.54 PB	Chiara Bazzoni	54.07	Maria Enrica Spacca	54.26 SB
800 m	Elisa Cusma Piccione	2:06.60	Elisabetta Artuso	2:06.98	Lorenza Canali	2:08.49
1500 m	Elisa Cusma Piccione	4:19.45 SB	Valentina Costanza	4:20.22 PB	Michela Zanatta	4:21.15 SB
3000 m	Federica Dal Ri	9:05.87	Agnes Tschurtschenthaler	9:07.39	Valentina Costanza	9:13.96
60 m hs	Marzia Caravelli	8.26 PB	Elisa Bettini	8.36 PB	Francesca Doveri	8.38 SB
4x1 lap relay	Forestale; Flavia Arcioni; Maria Enrica Spacca; Martina Giovanetti; Giulia Arcioni	1:38.28	Italgest Athletic Club; Laura Gamba; Martin Fugazza; Michela D'Angelo; Eleonora Sirtoli	1:40.80	Sesto; Giorgia Candiani; Chiara Colombo; Francesca Maino; Chiara Varisco	1:41.36
Race walk 3000 m	Sibilla Di Vincenzo	12:42.15	Eleonora Anna Giorgi	12:55.86	Agnese Ragonesi	13:06.22
High jump	Raffaella Lamera	1.90 PB	Elena Vallortigara	1.86	Daniela Galeotti	1.83 SB
Pole vault	Elena Scarpellini	4.30	Giorgia Benecchi	4.30	Giulia Cargnelli	4.10
Long jump	Serena Amato	6.03	Elisa Zanei	6.01 PB	Elisa Trevisan	5.98 PB
Triple jump	Magdelín Martínez	13.94	Simona La Mantia	13.82	Elena Vanessa Salvetti	12.93
Shot put	Julaika Nicoletti	16.35 PB	Elena Carini	14.09	Mara Rosolen	13.94 SB

== See also ==
- 2010 Italian Athletics Championships
