= 2009 Italian Athletics Championships =

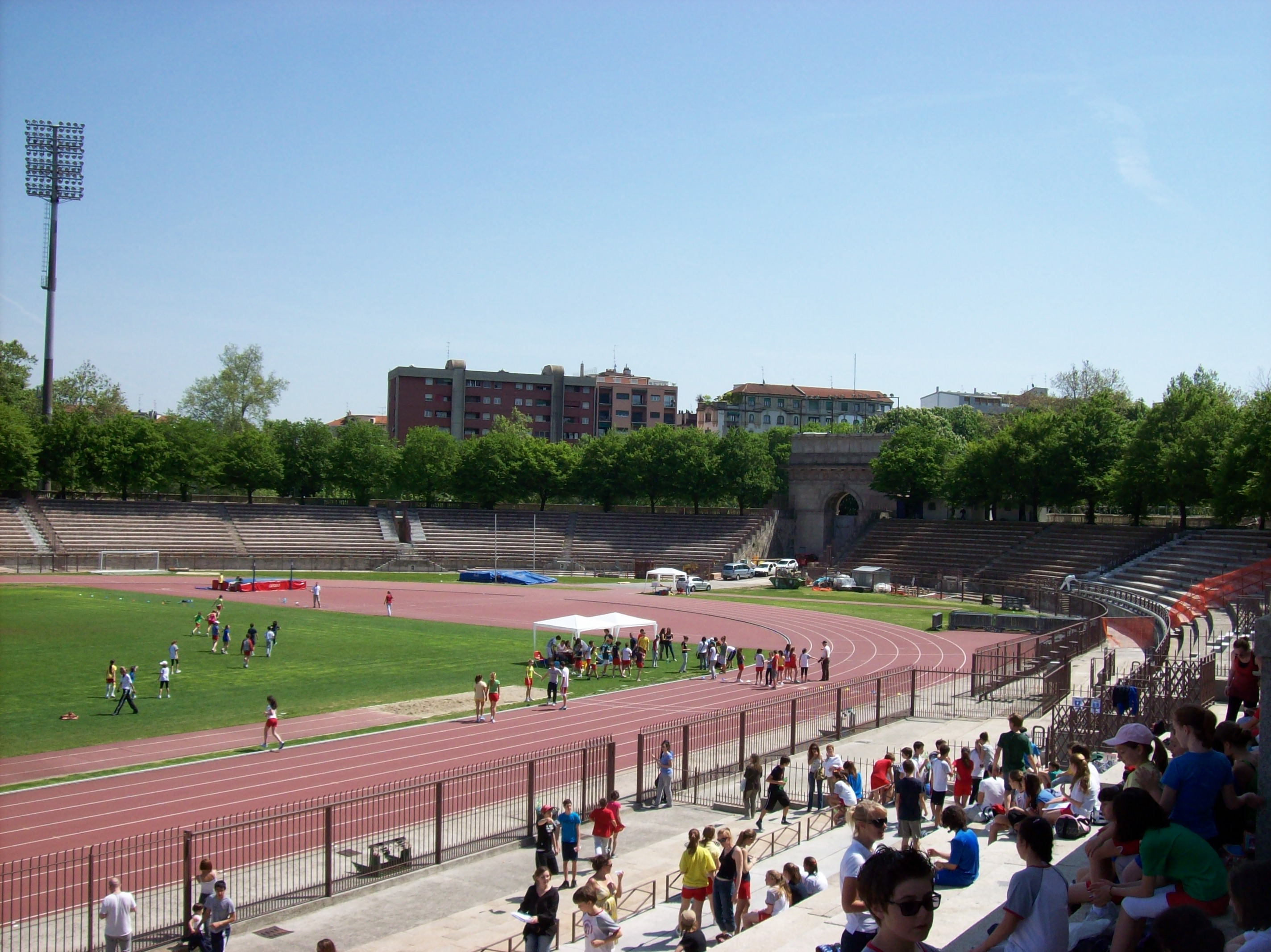
- The historical stadium Milan's Arena Civica
- Dates: 31 July – 2 August
- Host city: Milan
- Venue: Arena Civica
- Level: Senior
- Events: 42

The 2009 Italian Athletics Championships (Italian: Campionati italiani assoluti di atletica leggera 2009) was the 99th edition of the Italian Athletics Championships and were held in Grosseto from 31 July – 2 August.

== Champions ==
Event	Men	Women
100 m	Simone Collio	Anita Pistone
200 m	Roberto Donati	Giulia Arcioni
400 m	Matteo Galvan	Libania Grenot
800 m	Mario Scapini	Elisa Cusma
1500 m	Mario Scapini	Elena Romagnolo
5000 m	Stefano La Rosa	Federica Dal Rì
10,000 m	Stefano La Rosa	Anna Incerti
3000 m steeplechase	Matteo Villani	Emma Quaglia
100 m hurdles	Stefano Tedesco	Micol Cattanéo
400 m hurdles	Nicola Cascella	Benedetta Ceccarelli
Hogh jump	Nicola Ciotti	Raffaella Lamera
Pole vault	Giorgio Piantella	Anna Giordano Bruno
Long jump	Alessio Guarini	Tania Vicenzino
Triple jump	Fabrizio Schembri	Magdelín Martínez
Shot put	Marco Di Maggio	Chiara Rosa
Discus throw	Hannes Kirchler	Laura Bordignon
Hammer throw	Nicola Vizzoni	Clarissa Claretti
Javelin throw	Roberto Bertolini	Zahra Bani
10/5 km race walk	Ivano Brugnetti	Sibilla Di Vincenzo
4 × 100 m relay	Atletica Riccardi (Dentali-Marani-Pistono-Tomasicchio)	G.S. Forestale (Arcioni F.-Grillo-Arcioni G.-Giovanetti
4 × 400 m relay	Assindustria Padova (Ramalli-Picello-Zani-Cappelin)	C.S. Esercito (Bazzoni-Mutschlechner-Cusma-Milani)
