= 2008 Italian Athletics Indoor Championships =

- Dates: 23–23 February
- Host city: Genoa
- Venue: Palasport di Genova
- Level: Senior
- Events: 22 (13 men, 9 women) + relays

2008 Italian Athletics Indoor Championships was the 39th edition of the Italian Athletics Indoor Championships and were held in Genoa.

== Champions ==
Men
Event	Winner	Performance
60 m	Giovanni Tomasicchio	6.73
400 m	Claudio Licciardello	46.53
800 m	Livio Sciandra	1:48.47
1500 m	Christian Obrist	3:42.39
3000 m	Daniele Meucci	7:56.53
60 m hs	Emanuele Abate	7.89
High jump	Filippo Campioli	2.26
Pole vault	Matteo Rubbiani	5.30
Long jump	Ferdinando Iucolano	7.83
Triple jump	Fabrizio Donato	17.06
Shot put	Paolo Dal Soglio	18.61
Heptathlon	Franco Casiean	5404
5000 m walk	Ivano Brugnetti	18:33.06
Relay	Atletica Pavia	

Women
Event	Winner	Performance
60 m	Vincenza Calì	7.34
400 m	Daniela Reina	53.75
800 m	Elisa Cusma	2:08.53
1500 m	Agnes Tschurtschenthaler	4:20.15
3000 m	Silvia Weissteiner	8:57.61
60 m hs	Micol Cattaneo	8.14
High jump	Raffaella Lamera	1.83
Pole vault	Elena Scarpellini	4.25
Long jump	Valeria Canella	6.44
Triple jump	Magdelín Martínez	14.03
Shot put	Chiara Rosa	18.63
Pentathlon	Francesca Doveri	4236
3000 m walk	Elisa Rigaudo	12:10.23

== See also ==
- 2008 Italian Athletics Championships
