= Caroline Putnam =

Caroline Putnam may refer to:

- Caroline Remond Putnam (1826–1908), African-American abolitionist
- Caroline F. Putnam (1826–1917), abolitionist and educator from Massachusetts
