= Maraoui =

Maraoui is a surname. Notable people with the surname include:

- Rakiya Maraoui-Quétier (born 1967), Moroccan-born French long-distance runner
- Fatna Maraoui (born 1977), Moroccan-born Italian long-distance runner
