= Naturalized athletes of Italy =

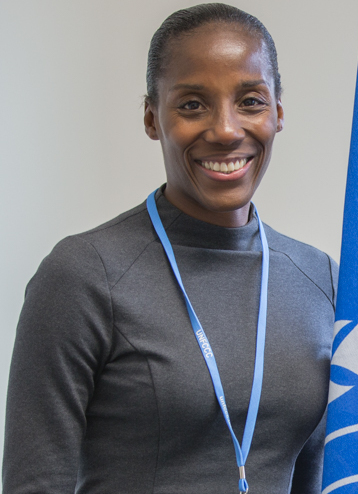
Fiona May, the born British two-time world champion in long jump, Italian naturalized for marriage.

The Naturalized athletes of Italy are those naturalized citizens who are part, or have been part, of the Italy national athletics team.

== The rules ==
The Italian Government and consequently FIDAL firstly, and then the IAAF, grants Italian citizenship, and the Italian passport, therefore the naturalization, to those citizens of foreign origin born in Italy (Italians therefore of second generation), or who have married an Italian citizen for the following reasons.

- Automatically
  - Ius sanguinis: for birth;
  - If an Italian citizen recognizes, at a time after birth, a minor child;
  - For adoption;
  - To obtain or re-obtain from a parent.
- Following declaration
  - By descent;
  - Ius soli: by birth or descent in Italy;
- By marriage or naturalization
  - By marriage: the foreign or stateless spouse of an Italian citizen may acquire Italian citizenship after two years of legal residence in Italy or, if residing abroad, after three years from the date of marriage;
  - By naturalization: the foreigner can apply for Italian citizenship after ten years of legal residence in Italy, reduced to five years for those who have been recognized as stateless or refugee and four years for citizens of countries of the European Community.

== The list ==
Italian citizen since birth

(However, in the case of children born in Italy from foreign parents, citizenship is obtained by the eighteenth birthday).

When there is ✓ is last update verified naturalization.

Continent	Country of origin	Athlete	Born	Reasons
Africa	Tanzania	Lorenzo Ndele Simonelli ✓	2002	Born in Dodoma, Tanzania to an Italian father (anthropologist and researcher) and a Tanzanian mother, he moved with his family to Rome at the age of 5.
Africa	Rwanda	Dominique Rovetta Gasigwa	1993	Born in Rwanda, adopted by a Brescian family at the age of 6 months.
Africa	Eritrea	Eyob Faniel ✓	1992	Born in Eritrea, came in Italy in 2004, he was naturalized in 2005 at 23.
Africa	Cameroon	Jacques Riparelli ✓	1983	His family (Italian father and Camerounese mother), came in Italy when he was 3.
Africa	Cameroon	Paolo Dal Molin ✓	1987	Born in Cameroun from Camerounese father and Italian mother, came in Italy when he was 10.
Africa	Sudan	Raphaela Lukudo ✓	1979	Born in Italy.
Africa	Somalia	Zahra Bani ✓	1979	Of Italian father.
Africa	Somalia	Mohad Abdikadar ✓	1993	Born in Somalia, arrived in Italy in 2006 as a refugee, he is an Italian citizen since 2011.
Africa	South Africa	Marcello Fiasconaro ✓	1949	Of Italian father, became Italian citizen in 1971.
Africa	South Africa	Zane Weir ✓	1995	Weir is Italian thanks to the roots of his maternal grandfather, from Trieste.
Africa	Nigeria	Desola Oki ✓	1999	Born in Italy from Nigerian parents.
Africa	Nigeria	Emmanuel Ihemeje ✓	1998	He born in Carrara, Tuscany from Nigerian parents but lives in Verdellino near Bergamo.
Africa	Nigeria	Daisy Osakue ✓	1996	Born in Italy, but naturalized at 18.
Africa	Nigeria	Ayomide Folorunso ✓	1996	Her parents lived in Italy for a long time. She became Italian from the age of 18.
Africa	Nigeria	Kevin Ojiaku ✓	1989	Born in Italy from Nigerian father already Italian citizen.
Africa	Nigeria	Eseosa Desalu ✓	1994	Born in Italy from Nigerian parents, he acquires Italian citizenship at the age of 18.
Africa	Nigeria	Benedicta Chigbolu ✓	1989	Of Italian mother.
Africa	Côte d'Ivoire	Zaynab Dosso ✓	1999	Italian citizen from 2016.
Africa	Côte d'Ivoire	Moillet Kouakou ✓	1999	Italian citizen from 2017.
Africa	Côte d'Ivoire	Audrey Alloh ✓	1987	Her parents lived in Italy for a long time. She became Italian from the age of 18.
Africa	Côte d'Ivoire	Hassane Fofana ✓	1992	Born in Italy from Ivorian parents, became Italian when he was eighteen.
Africa	Côte d'Ivoire	Delmas Obou ✓	1991	His Ivorian parents came in Italy in 1993, he came in 1999 and became Italian when he was eighteen.
Africa	Côte d'Ivoire	Franck Brice Koua ✓	2001	His Ivorian parents came in Italy.
Africa	Ghana	Gloria Hooper ✓	1992	Born in Italy.
Africa	Ethiopia	Merihun Crespi ✓	1988	Born in Blaten, Ethiopia, adopted when he was 3 by Italian family.
Africa	Ethiopia	Yemaneberhan Crippa ✓	1996	Born in Addis Abeba, Ethiopia, adopted when he was 7 by Italian family, he became Italian at 18.
Africa	Ethiopia	Yohanes Chiappinelli ✓	1997	Born in Ethiopia, adopted by Italian family, he became Italian at 18.
Africa	Tunisia	Ala Zoghlami ✓	1994	Zoghlami twins come in Italy at the age of two, but became Italian just nineteeners.
Africa	Tunisia	Osama Zoghlami ✓	1994	Zoghlami twins come in Italy at the age of two, but became Italian just nineteeners.
Africa	Mozambique	João Bussotti ✓	1993	Adopted by Italian father. He became Italian in from the age of 18.
Africa	Senegal	Erika Furlani ✓	1996	Born in Italy from Italian father.
Africa	Morocco	Kaddour Slimani ✓	1984	Become Italian citizen in 2007, at 28, per married with Wilma Biancossi.
Africa	Morocco	Yassin Bouih ✓	1996	Born in Italy from Moroccan parents become Italian at 18.
Africa	Morocco	Laila Soufyane ✓	1983	She married an Italian citizen.
Africa	Morocco	Mohamed Laqouahi ✓	1988	Became Italian in 2013.
Africa	Morocco	Marco Najibe Salami ✓	1988	Born in Italy from Moroccan father, became Italian in 2004.
Africa	Morocco	Marouan Razine ✓	1991	Arrived in Italy in 2000 at the age of 6, he was naturalized Italian at 22.
Africa	Morocco	Yassine Rachik ✓	1993	Italian citizen from 2015.
Africa	Morocco	Fatna Maraoui ✓	1977	Naturalized by marriage from 2003.
Africa	Morocco	Nadia Ejjafini ✓	1977	By marriage,
Africa	Morocco	Abdoullah Bamoussa ✓	1986	He became Italian from 2015.
Africa	Morocco	Migidio Bourifa ✓	1971	The father, of Moroccan origins, led him to be born in Morocco to provide him with a double passport.
Africa	Morocco	Mostafa Errebbah ✓	1971	
Africa	Morocco	Abdellah Haidane ✓	1989	
Africa	Morocco	Jamel Chatbi ✓	1984	He was a Moroccan athlete since 2009.
Africa	Morocco	Ahmed El Mazoury ✓	1990	Arrived in Italy at the age of 5, he was a naturalized Italian at 18.
Africa	Morocco	Touria Samiri ✓	1988	She became Italian from 2008 at 20.
Africa	Egypt	Ashraf Saber ✓	1973	Born in Italy to an Egyptian father and a Sicilian mother.
Africa	Egypt	Ahmed Abdelwahed ✓	1996	Born in Rome to Egyptian parents, he became Italian at 18.
Africa	Republic of the Congo	Koura Kaba Fantoni ✓	1984	He became an Italian citizen in 2002, following the adoption by the family of his trainer Milvio Fantoni.
Africa	Republic of the Congo	Jean-Jacques Nkouloukidi ✓	1982	Born in Rome from a family of Congolese origins (from a father), he became Italian at 18.
North America	United States	Andrew Howe ✓	1985	His mother married an Italian in second marriage, then he became Italian at 5 in 1990.
North America	United States	Jennifer Rockwell ✓	1983	His grandfather was Italian. She has a double passport since the age of 29.
North America	United States	Marcell Jacobs ✓	1994	Born in the USA from a Texan father, his mother is an Italian from Italy.
North America	United States	Giancarla Trevisan ✓	1993	His father is Italian migrated in USA. Opted for Italian citizenship from 2017.
North America	United States	Nick Ponzio ✓	1995	Born in San Diego in a family of Italian descent (his great-grandfather was Sicilian). Opted for Italian citizenship in 2021.
North America	Cuba	Libania Grenot ✓	1983	By marriage.
North America	Cuba	Magdelín Martínez ✓	1976	She started to compete with Cuba, she became Italian by marriage in 1999.
North America	Cuba	Thaimi O’Reilly Causse ✓	1976	Born in Cuba, she moved to Italy in 1999 and in 2001 she acquired citizenship by marriage.
North America	Cuba	Yusneysi Santiusti ✓	1984	She came in Italy by marriage in 2007, but was naturalized only in 2013.
North America	Cuba	Yadisleidy Pedroso ✓	1987	By marriage. She is an Italian citizen since 7 February 2013.
North America	Cuba	Isalbet Juarez ✓	1984	His parents lived in Italy for a long time. She became Italian from the age of 18.
North America	Dominican Republic	José Bencosme ✓	1992	Arrived in Italy with his mother at the age of one. He became Italian from the age of 17.
North America	Dominican Republic	Robel Garcia ✓	1993	Married a Dominican-Italian and naturalized through marriage.
North America	Dominican Republic	Johanelis Herrera ✓	1995	Born in Santo Domingo, she came in Italy in 2003 and start to run for this country in 2013.
Europe	France	Fabe Dia ✓	1977	She changed nationality on 2009 by marriage with the middle-distance runner Andrea Longo.
Europe	Turkey	Catherine Bertone ✓	1972	Born in Turkey from Italian father and French mother.
Europe	United Kingdom	Fiona May ✓	1969	By marriage with Gianni Iapichino, became an Italian citizen in 1994.
Europe	United Kingdom	Antonio Infantino ✓	1969	Born in England to his Avellinese mother and his father from Agrigento, became an Italian citizen in 2016.
Europe	Ukraine	Dariya Derkach ✓	1993	Her parents lived in Italy for a long time. She became Italian from the age of 20.
Europe	Albania	Eusebio Haliti ✓	1991	He became Italian from 2012 (21 years old).
Europe	Hungary	Judit Varga ✓	1976	
Europe	Russia	Vladimir Aceti ✓	1998	Adopted when he was 5 by an Italian family.
Oceania	Australia	Danielle Perpoli ✓	1968	Born in Australia, she began to care in this country before moving permanently to Tuscany and opting for Italian citizenship.

== See also ==
- List of eligibility transfers in athletics
- Italian nationality law
- Naturalization – Law in Italy
- Athletics in Italy
- Italy national athletics team
- Italy national relay team
