= Cominotto (surname) =

Cominotto is an Italian surname. Notable people with the surname include:

- Guido Cominotto (1901–1967), Italian sprinter and middle-distance runner
- Manuel Cominotto (born 1990), Italian male long-distance runner

== See also ==
- Cominotto
