= Kaddour Slimani =

Italian long-distance runner

Personal information
- Nationality: Italian
- Born: 25 December 1984 (age 41) Rommani, Morocco

Sport
- Country: Italy
- Sport: Athletics
- Event: Long-distance running
- Club: Atletica Cistella

Achievements and titles
- Personal bests: 5000 m: 13:34.32 (2009); 10,000 m: 29:37.22 (2011)

Kaddour Slimani (born 25 December 1984) is a Moroccan-born Italian male long-distance runner who competed at 2010 IAAF World Cross Country Championships.

== Biography ==
Slimani become Italian citizen in 2007, at 28, per married with Wilma Biancossi.

== National titles ==
He won a national championships at individual senior level.

- Italian Cross Country Championships
  - Long race: 2010

== See also ==
- Naturalized athletes of Italy
