= Pietro Riva =

Italian long-distance runner

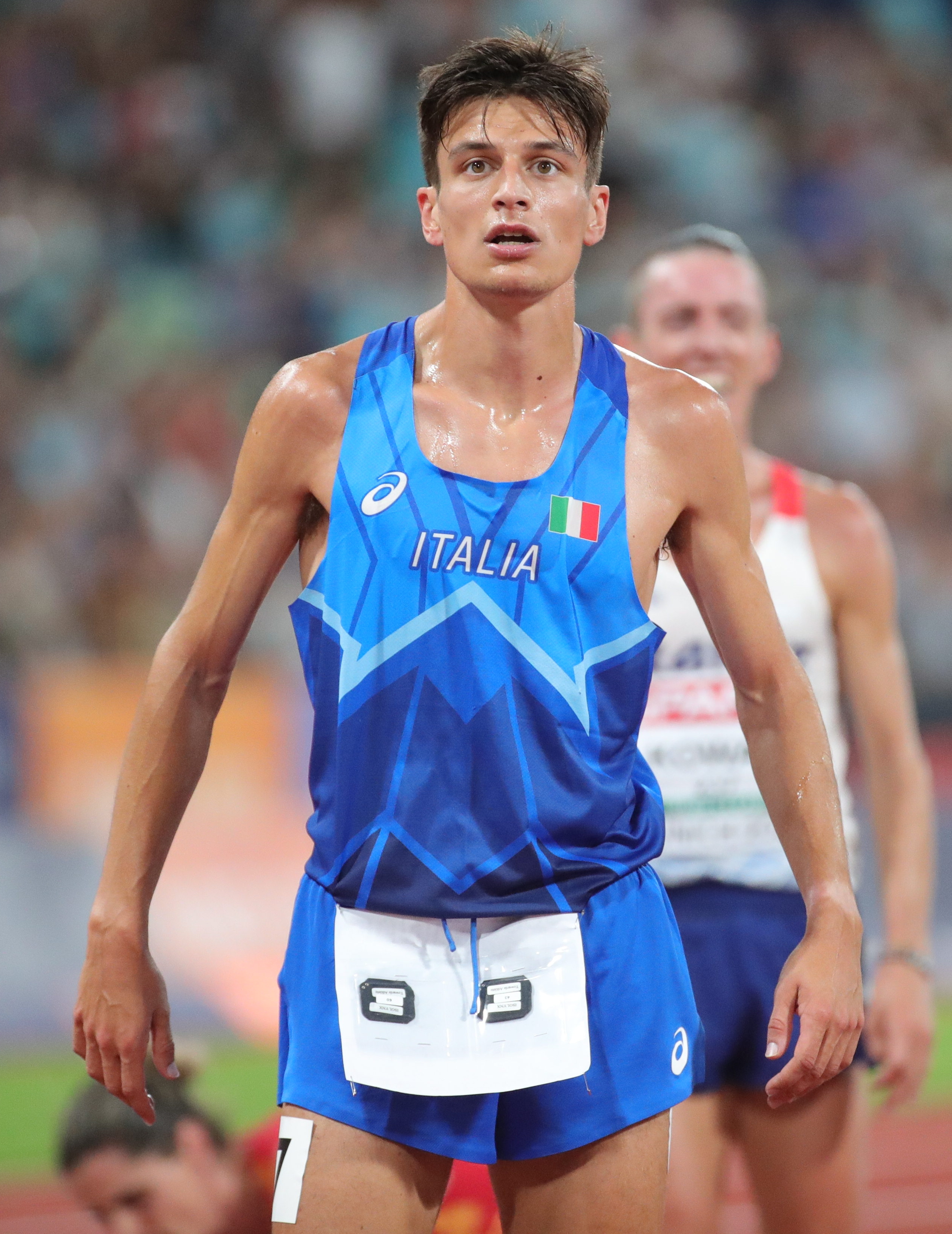
- Riva in 2022.

Personal information
- National team: Italy
- Born: 1 May 1997 (age 29) Alba, Italy
- Height: 1.83 m (6 ft 0 in)
- Weight: 65 kg (143 lb)

Sport
- Sport: Athletics
- Event: Long-distance running
- Club: Fiamme Oro Padova
- Coached by: Stefano Baldini

Achievements and titles
- Personal bests: 5000 m: 13:22.73 (2022); 10,000 m: 27:50.51 (2022); 10 km: 27:50 NR (2022)
Medal record
Men's athletics
Representing Italy
Event	1st	2nd	3rd
European Championships	0	2	0
European U20 Championships	1	0	0
European Cross Country C'ships (U20)	0	1	0
Total	1	3	0
European Championships
Silver medal – second place	2024 Rome	Half marathon
Silver medal – second place	2026 Birmingham	Marathon
European U-20 Championships
Gold medal – first place	2015 Eskilstuna	10,000 m

Pietro Riva (born 1 May 1997) is an Italian long-distance runner.

== Achievements ==
Year	Competition	Venue	Rank	Event	Time	Notes
2022	European Championships	Munich, Germany	5th	10,000 m	27:50.51	PB
2024	European Championships	Rome, Italy	2nd	Half marathon	1:01.04	PB
2026	European Championships	Birmingham, United Kingdom	2nd	Marathon	2:09.18	

== National titles ==
Riva won 6 national championships at individual senior level.

- Italian Athletics Championships
  - 5000 m: 2021
  - 10,000 m: 2022, 2023, 2024
- Italian 10 km road Championship
  - 10 km road: 2022, 2023
