= Francesco Guerra (runner) =

Italian long-distance runner

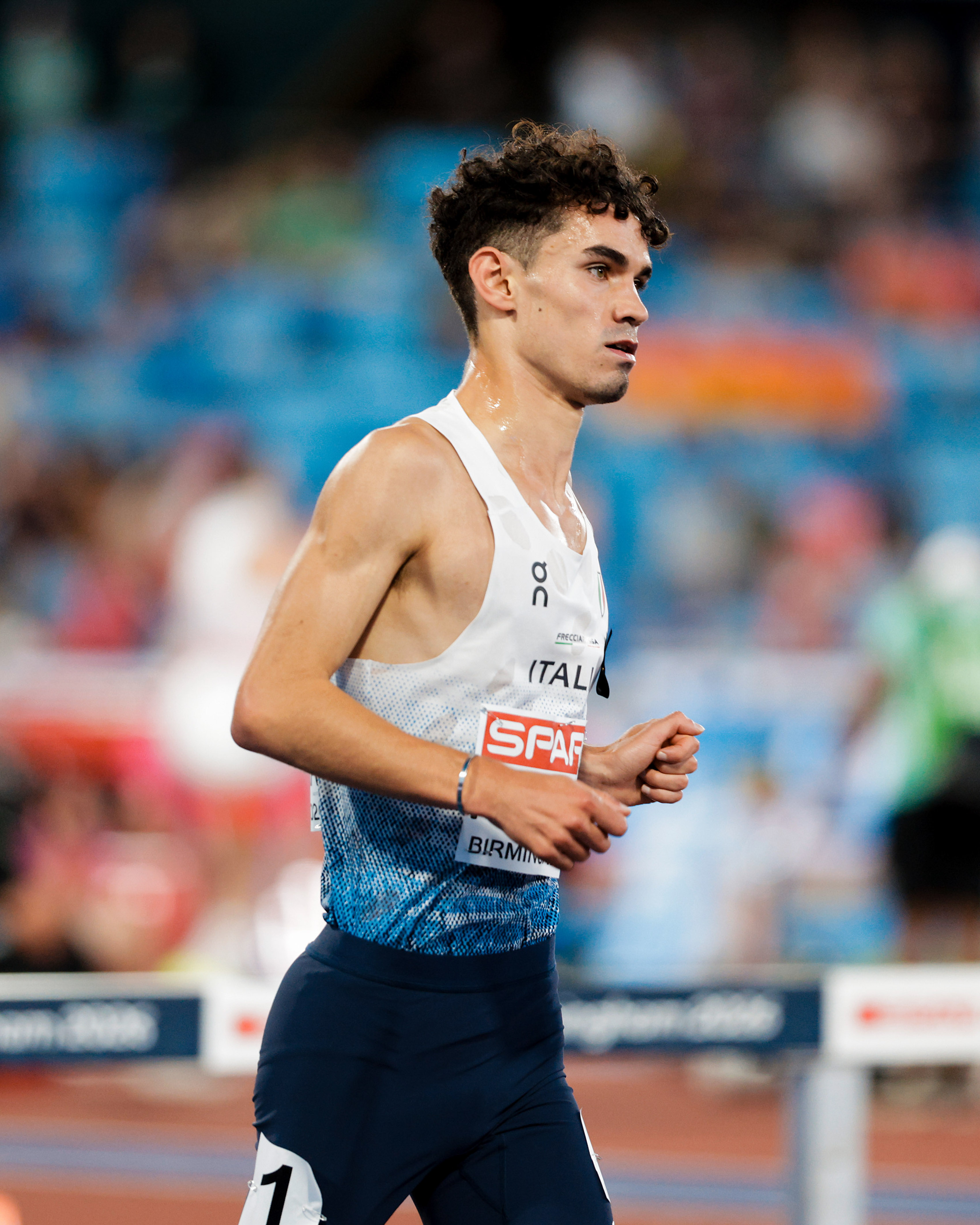
- Guerra at Birmingham 2026

Personal information
- National team: Italy
- Born: 17 July 2001 (age 25) Rome, Italy
- Height: 1.81 m (5 ft 11 in)
- Weight: 62 kg (137 lb)

Sport
- Sport: Athletics
- Event: Long-distance running
- Club: Carabinieri Bologna
- Coached by: Stefano Baldini

Achievements and titles
- Personal bests: 10,000 m: 28:22.07 (2024); 10 km: 27:39 (2025)
Medal record
Men's athletics
Representing Italy
European U23 Championships
Silver medal – second place	2023 Espoo	10,000 m

Francesco Guerra (born 17 July 2001) is an Italian long-distance runner four-time Italian champion at senior level

== Career ==
In 2023 he won the silver medal at the European Under-23 Championships in Espoo in the 10,000 metres. In June 2024 he was called up for the European Championships in Rome, finishing 23rd in the 10,000 metres.

== National titles ==
Guerra won 4 national championships at individual senior level.

- Italian Athletics Championships
  - 10,000 m: 2025, 2026
- Italian 10 km road Championship
  - 10 km road: 2024, 2025
