= Italian 10 km road Championship =

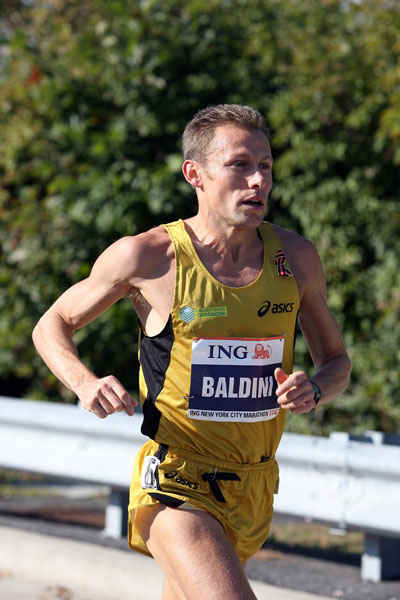
Stefano Baldini, the first italian Champion of the 10K run.

The Italian 10 km road Championship (Campionato italiano 10 km corsa su strada in italian language) is the Italy national championship of the 10 km road held for the first time in 2010.

== Editions ==
#	Year	Venue	Date	Details
1st	2010	Pordenone	12 September	
2nd	2011	Lucca	11 September	
3rd	2012	Scicli (men) & Modica (women). Ragusa	29-30 September	
4th	2013	Molfetta. Bari	20 September	
5th	2014	Isernia	2 August	
6th	2015	Trecastagni, Catania	12 September	
7th	2016	Foligno, Perugia	10 September	
8th	2017	Dalmine, Bergamo	9 September	
9th	2018	Alberobello, Bari	1 September	
10th	2019	Canelli, Asti	8 September	
11th	2020	Caserta (cancelled due to Covid-19)	11 October	
12th	2021	Forlì	10 October	
13th	2022	Castelfranco Veneto	3 September	
14th	2023	Pescara	10 September	
15th	2024	Arezzo	6 October	
16th	2025	Prato	2 November	
17th	2026	Grado	4 October	

== Winners ==
=== Men ===
- 2010: Stefano Baldini
- 2011: Stefano Scaini
- 2012: Domenico Ricatti
- 2013: Mohamed Laqouahi
- 2014: Andrea Lalli
- 2105: Manuel Cominotto
- 2016: Marouan Razine
- 2017: Yassine Rachik
- 2018: Marco Salami
- 2019: Lorenzo Dini
- 2020: Cancelled
- 2021: Iliass Aouani
- 2022: Pietro Riva
- 2023: Pietro Riva
- 2024: Francesco Guerra
- 2025: Francesco Guerra
- 2026:

=== Women ===
- 2010: Agnes Tschurtschenthaler
- 2011: Valeria Straneo
- 2012: Valeria Straneo
- 2013: Veronica Inglese
- 2014: Laila Soufyane
- 2015: Anna Incerti
- 2016: Fatna Maraoui
- 2017: Fatna Maraoui
- 2018: Sara Dossena
- 2019: Fatna Maraoui
- 2020: Cancelled
- 2021: Sofiia Yaremchuk
- 2022: Sofiia Yaremchuk
- 2023: Nadia Battocletti
- 2024: Valentina Gemetto
- 2025: Valentina Gemetto
- 2026:

== See also ==
- Italian Athletics Championships
- 10K run
