= 2010 Italian Athletics Championships =

- Dates: 30 June – 1 July
- Host city: Grosseto
- Venue: Stadio Carlo Zecchini
- Level: Senior
- Events: 42

The 2010 Italian Athletics Championships (Italian: Campionati italiani assoluti di atletica leggera 2010) was the 100th edition of the Italian Athletics Championships and were held in Grosseto from 30 June to 1 July.

== Champions ==
| Event | Men | Women |
|---|---|---|
| 100 m | Simone Collio | Manuela Levorato |
| 200 m | Roberto Donati | Giulia Arcioni |
| 400 m | Marco Vistalli | Libania Grenot |
| 800 m | Lukas Rifesser | Antonella Riva |
| 1500 m | Gilio Iannone | Elisa Cusma |
| 5000 m | Stefano La Rosa | Federica Dal Ri |
| 10,000 m | Daniele Meucci | Claudia Finielli |
| 3000 m | Yuri Floriani | Valentina Costanza |
| 100 m hurdles | Stefano Tedesco | Marzia Caravelli |
| 400 m hurdles | Giacomo Panizza | Manuela Gentili |
| High jump | Filippo Campioli | Antonietta Di Martino |
| Pole vault | Giorgio Piantella | Elena Scarpellini |
| Long jump | Andrew Howe | Tania Vicenzino |
| Triple jump | Fabrizio Donato | Simona La Mantia |
| Shot put | Andrea Ricci | Chiara Rosa |
| Discus throw | Hannes Kirchler | Laura Bordignon |
| Hammer throw | Nicola Vizzoni | Silvia Salis |
| Javelin throw | Roberto Bertolini | Zahra Bani |
| 10 km/5 km walk road | Alex Schwazer | Sibilla Di Vincenzo |
| 4X100 relay | C.S. Aeronautica (Riparelli-Berdini-Manenti-Di Gregorio) | G.S. Forestale (Spacca-Grillo-Arcioni G.-Giovanetti) |
| 4X400 relay | C.S. Carabinieri (Turchi-Salvucci-Marin-Galletti) | Fondiaria SAI Atletica (Gervasi-Grange-Battaglia-Piangerelli) |
