= Sarah Parker Remond =

American anti-slavery activist (1826–1894)

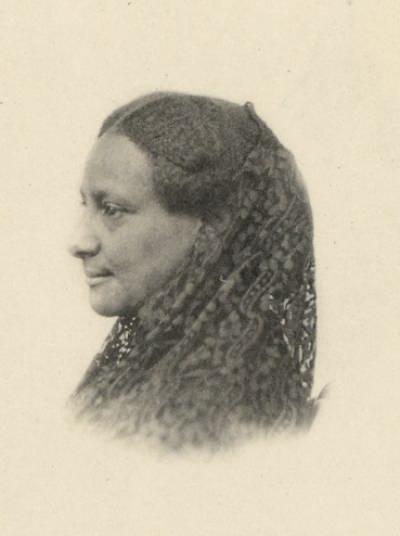
- Born: June 6, 1826; Salem, Massachusetts, United States
- Died: December 13, 1894 (aged 68); Rome, Italy
- Education: Bedford College; Hospital of Santa Maria Nuova
- Occupations: Activist, physician
- Spouse: Lazzaro Pintor
- Parent(s): John Remond (father); Nancy Lenox (mother)
- Relatives: Charles Lenox Remond (brother); Caroline Remond Putnam (sister); Cecilia Remond Putnam (sister); Marchita Remond (sister)

Sarah Parker Remond (June 6, 1826 – December 13, 1894) was an American-born British lecturer, activist, abolitionist campaigner and Italian physician.

Born a free woman in the state of Massachusetts, she became an international activist for human rights and women's suffrage. Remond made her first public speech against the institution of slavery when she was 16 years old, and delivered abolitionist speeches throughout the northeastern United States. One of her brothers, Charles Lenox Remond, became known as an orator and they occasionally toured together for their abolitionist lectures.

Eventually becoming an agent of the American Anti-Slavery Society, in 1858 Remond chose to travel to Britain to gather support for the growing abolitionist cause in the United States. While in London, Remond also studied at Bedford College, lecturing during term breaks. During the American Civil War, she appealed for support among the British public for the Union and their blockade of the Confederacy. After the conclusion of the war in favor of the Union, she appealed for funds to support the millions of newly emancipated freedmen in the American South.

From England, Remond went to Italy in 1867 to pursue medical training in Florence, where she became a physician. She practiced medicine for nearly 20 years in Italy and never returned to the United States, dying in Rome at the age of 68.

== Early years ==
Born in Salem, Massachusetts, Remond was one of the between eight and 11 children of Nancy (née Lenox) and John Remond. Nancy had been born in Newton, daughter of Cornelius Lenox, a Revolutionary War veteran who had fought in the Continental Army, and Susanna Perry. John Remond was a free person of color who immigrated to Massachusetts from the Dutch colony of Curaçao as a 10-year-old child in 1798. John and Nancy married in October 1807, in the African Baptist Church in Boston. In Salem, they built a successful catering, provisioning, and hairdressing business, becoming well-established businesspeople and activists.

The Remonds tried to place their children in a private school, but they were rejected because of their race. When Sarah Remond and her sisters were accepted to a local high school for girls which was not segregated, they were expelled, as the school committee was planning to found a separate school for African-American children. Remond later described the incident as engraved in her heart "like the scarlet letter of Hester." In 1835, the Remond family moved to Newport, Rhode Island, where they hoped to find a less racist environment in which to educate their children. However, the schools refused to accept black students. Instead, some influential African Americans established a private school, where Remond was educated.

In 1841, the Remond family returned to Salem. Sarah Remond continued her education on her own, attending concerts and lectures, and reading widely in books, pamphlets and newspapers borrowed from friends, or purchased from the anti-slavery society of her community, which sold many inexpensive titles. The Remond family also took in as boarders students who were attending the local girls' academy, including Charlotte Forten (later Grimké).

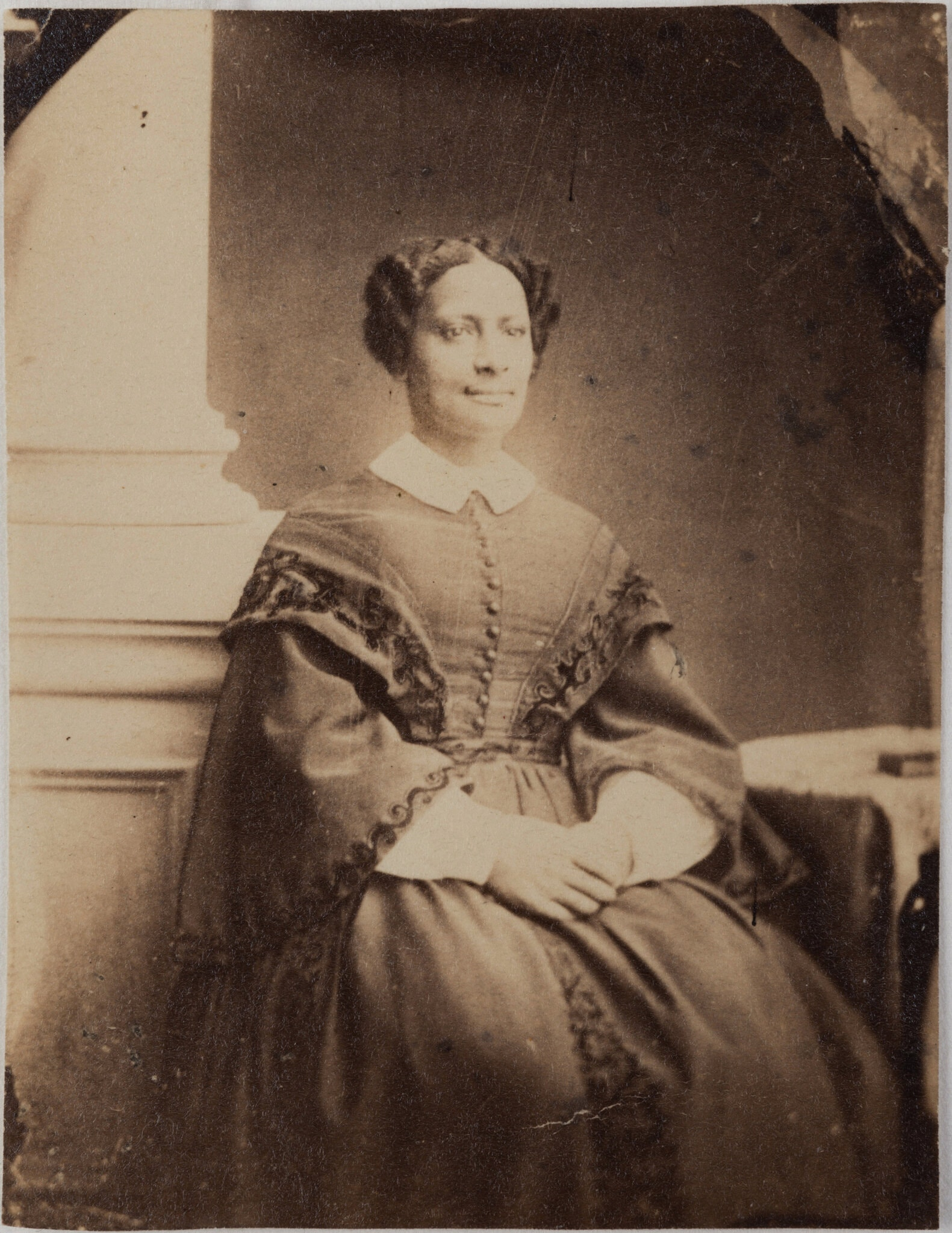
Sarah Parker Remond

Three of Remond's sisters built a business together: Cecilia (married to James Babcock), Maritchie Juan, and Caroline (married to Joseph Putnam), "owned the fashionable Ladies Hair Work Salon" in Salem, as well as the biggest wig factory in the state. Their oldest sister Nancy married James Shearman, an oyster dealer. The Remond brothers were Charles Remond, who became an abolitionist and orator; and John Remond, who married Ruth Rice, one of two women elected to the finance committee of the 1859 New England Colored Citizens' Convention.

== Anti-slavery activism and lecturing ==
Salem in the 1840s was a center of anti-slavery activity, and the whole family was committed to the rising abolitionist movement in the United States. The Remonds' home was a haven for black and white abolitionists, and they hosted many of the movement's leaders, including William Lloyd Garrison and Wendell Phillips, and more than one fugitive slave fleeing north to freedom. John Remond was a life member of the Massachusetts Anti-Slavery Society. Sarah Remond's older brother Charles Lenox Remond was the first black lecturer of the American Anti-Slavery Society's and considered a leading black abolitionist. Nancy Remond was one of the founders of the Salem Female Anti-Slavery Society. Nancy not only taught her daughters the household skills of cooking and sewing but also to seek liberty lawfully; she wanted them to take part in society. With her mother and sisters, Sarah Remond was an active member of the state and county female anti-slavery societies, including the Salem Female Anti-Slavery Society, the New England Anti-Slavery Society, and the Massachusetts Anti-Slavery Society. She also regularly attended antislavery lectures in Salem and Boston.

With the support and financial backing of her family, Sarah Remond became an anti-slavery lecturer, delivering her first lecture against slavery at the age of 16, with her brother Charles in Groton, Massachusetts, in July 1842. Remond rose to prominence among abolitionists in 1853, when she refused to sit in a segregated theater section. She had bought tickets by post for herself and a group of friends, including historian William C. Nell, to the popular opera, Don Pasquale, at the Howard Athenaeum in Boston. When they arrived at the theatre, Remond was shown to segregated seating. After refusing to accept it, she was forced to leave the theatre and pushed down some stairs. Remond sued for damages and won her case. She was awarded $500, and an admission by theatre management that she was wronged; the court ordered the theater to integrate all seating.

In 1856, the American Anti-Slavery Society hired a team of lecturers, including Remond; Charles, already well known in the U.S. and Britain; and Susan B. Anthony, to tour New York State addressing anti-slavery issues. Over the next two years, she, her brother, and others also spoke in New York, Massachusetts, Ohio, Michigan and Pennsylvania. She and other African Americans were often given poor accommodation due to racial discrimination. Although inexperienced, Remond rapidly became an effective speaker. William Lloyd Garrison praised her "calm, dignified manner, her winning personal appearance and her earnest appeals to the conscience and the heart." Sarah Clay wrote that Remond's every word "waked up dormant aspirations which would vibrate through the ages." Over time, she became one of the society's most persuasive and powerful lecturers.

Abby Kelley Foster, a noted abolitionist in Massachusetts, encouraged Remond when they toured together in 1857. On December 28, 1858, Remond wrote in a letter to Foster:

I feel almost sure I never should have made the attempt but for the words of encouragement I received from you. Although my heart was in the work, I felt that I was in need of a good English education ... When I consider that the only reason why I did not obtain what I so much desired was because I was the possessor of an unpopular complexion, it adds to my discomfort.

== Anti-slavery lecturing in Great Britain ==
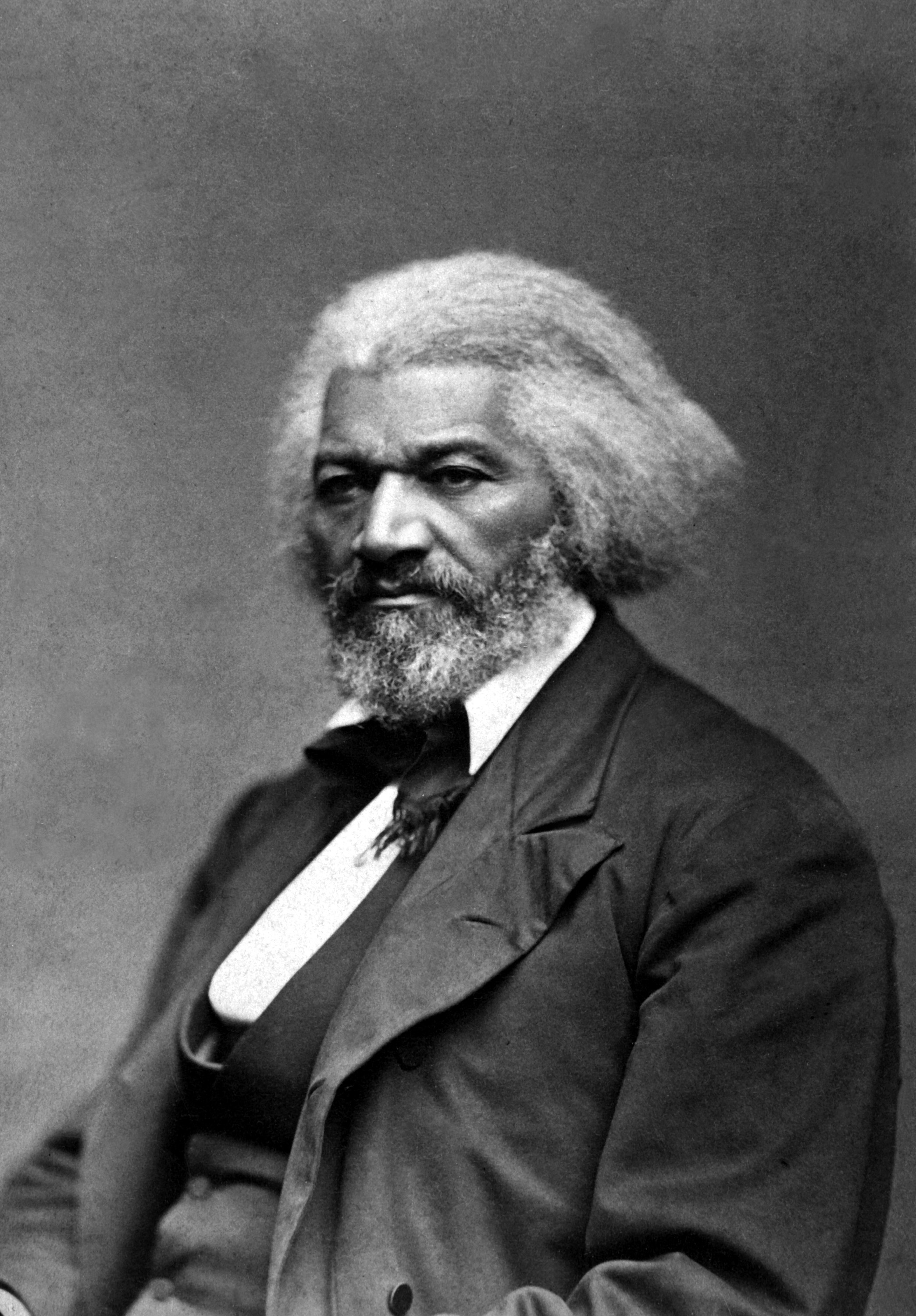
Remond toured in Britain alongside Frederick Douglass, pictured here c. 1879.

As a good speaker and fundraiser, Remond was invited to take the cause of the American abolitionists to Britain, as her brother Charles had done 10 years earlier. Accompanied by the Reverend Samuel May Jr., she sailed from Boston for Liverpool on December 28, 1858, on the steamer Arahia. They arrived in Liverpool on January 12, 1859, after a discomforting trip in the winter. The ship had become covered with ice and snow, and rolled and tossed so much that many of the passengers became ill, including Remond. At Tuckerman Institute on January 21, 1859, Remond gave her first antislavery lecture in England. Her second lecture, "Slave Life in America," took place just a few days later on January 24. During these speeches, she spoke eloquently of the inhumane treatment of slaves in the United States, her stories shocking many of her listeners. She also described the discrimination endured by free blacks throughout the United States.

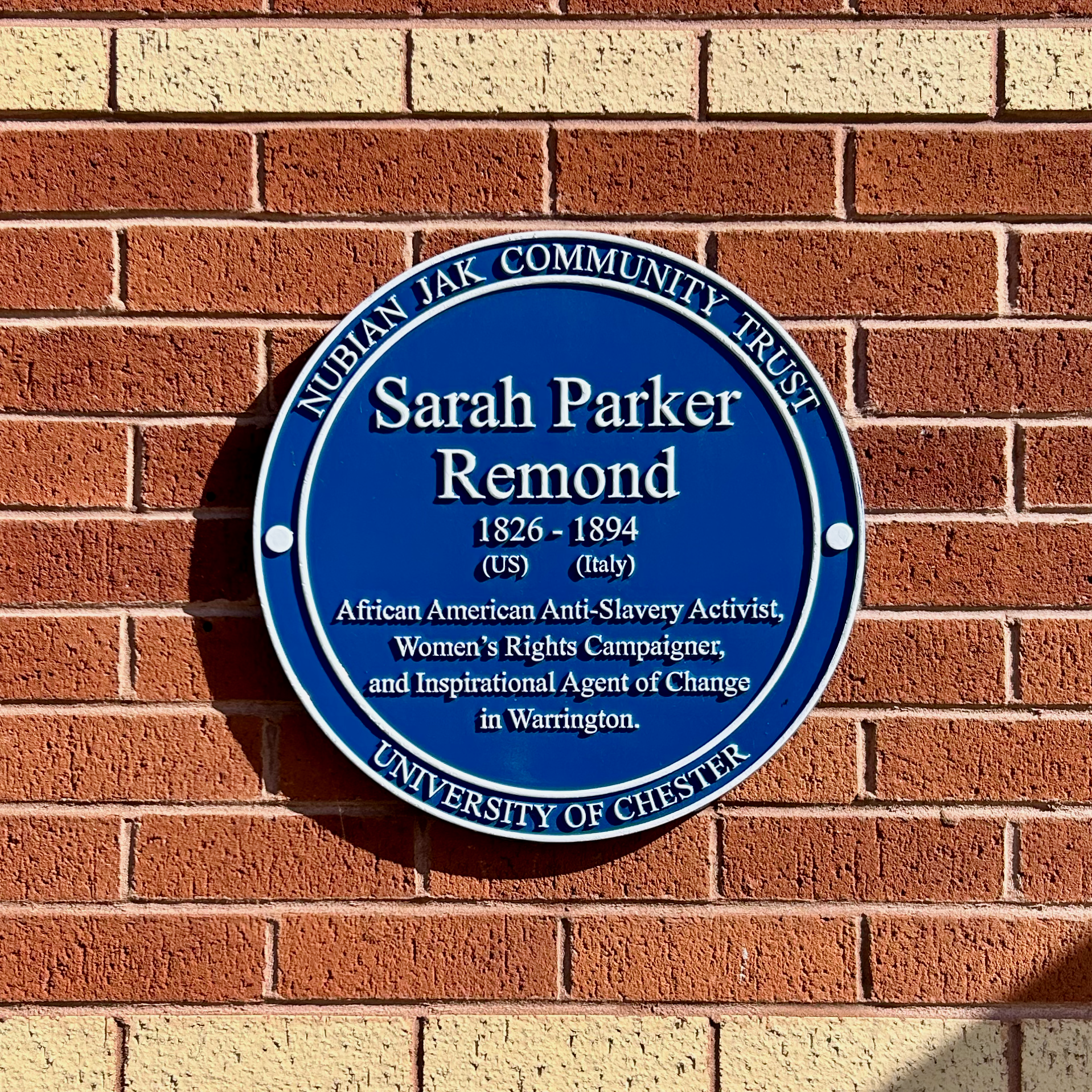
A blue plaque commemorates Remond's time in Warrington.

For the next three years, Remond lectured to crowds in several other towns and cities throughout the British Isles (including Warrington, Manchester, London, and Leeds), raising large sums of money for the anti-slavery cause. Between 1859 and 1861, she gave more than 45 lectures in England, Ireland, and Scotland. Remond also appeared at times with Frederick Douglass. In 1860, at the invitation of Eliza Wigham's Edinburgh Ladies' Emancipation Society, she gave a lecture in Edinburgh that was "crowded to the door by a most respectable audience, number upwards of 2000", whose consciences she awakened to a deepened "abhorrence of the sin of Slavery". Although before she sailed to the UK, Remond expected to confront prejudice similar as what she encountered in the United States – writing to Abby Kelly Foster that she feared not "the wind nor the waves, but I know that no matter how I go, the spirit of prejudice will meet me" – she met with a greater acceptance in Britain. "I have been received here as a sister by white women for the first time in my life," she wrote; "I have received a sympathy I never was offered before."

Remond was praised for her speeches, in which she spoke out against slavery and racial discrimination, stressing the sexual exploitation of black women under slavery. Remond called on common themes found in sentimental fiction, such as family, womanhood, and marriage, to evoke an emotional response in her audience. In her short autobiography, written in 1861, she observed that "prejudice against colour has always been the one thing, above all others, which has cast its gigantic shadow over my whole life." During her speaking tours of the British Isles, Remond and her fellow U.S. abolitionists drew comparisons between American slavery and the plight of the British working class during the Industrial Revolution, leading to abolitionists in Britain to note that their lectures were "packed almost entirely by [the] working class".

Once the American Civil War (1861–1865) began, Remond worked to build support in Britain for the Union blockade of the Confederacy and the Union cause. Because British textile factories relied heavily on American cotton from the Southern United States, Remond focused on this in her lectures. In an 1862 speech, she implored her London audience to "Let no diplomacy of statesmen, no intimidation of slaveholders, no scarcity of cotton, no fear of slave insurrections, prevent the people of Great Britain from maintaining their position as the friend of the oppressed negro." After the conclusion of the Civil War, Remond changed her focus to lecture on behalf of the millions of freedmen in the United States, soliciting funds and clothing for them. She was an active member of the London Emancipation Society and the Freedman's Aid Association in London. Her lecture "The Freeman or the Emancipated Negro of the Southern States of the United States," delivered in London, was published in The Freedman (London) in 1867. In the mid-1860s, Remond published a letter from London in the Daily News protesting that racial prejudice had worsened thanks to the efforts of planters in the West Indies and the American South.

== Education and later years ==
From October 1859 to June 1861, Remond undertook studies at Bedford College (later part of the University of London and now merged with Royal Holloway College). She studied classical academic subjects: French, Latin, English literature, music, history and elocution, continuing to give her own lectures during college vacations. During this period, she also traveled to Rome and Florence in Italy.

In 1859, Redmond was denied a visa to visit France by the American Embassy, which attempted to claim that Black Americans were not considered full US citizens. This resulted in a press scandal.

Remond continued to be involved in the abolitionist and feminist causes in Britain. She was a member first of the London Emancipation Committee, and then helped found and served on the executive committee of the Ladies' London Emancipation Society, which was organised in 1863. Remond is thought to be the only black woman who was among the 1500 signatories to a women-only 1866 petition requesting the right of women to vote. Returning briefly to the U.S., Remond joined with the American Equal Rights Association working for equal suffrage for women and African Americans.

In 1865, Redmond made a formal application for British citizenship, stating that she had lived in London for six years, was "of African descent and a native of Salem Massachusetts in the United States of America" but that "under no circumstances" could she return to live in America again because of "the strong prejudice against persons of African descent which is entertained by a large proportion of the inhabitants of the United States and the social disabilities under which such persons consequently suffer". Referees for Redmond's application included lawyer Matthew Davenport Hill and politician Sir James Stanfeld who attested to her good character. Her British citizenship was granted on 11 September 1865. Redmond met some discrimination while in Britain, if less overt than in the United States but her disillusionment grew after the brutal punishment and executions of Black protestors in the 1865 Morant Bay Rebellion in Jamaica by the British.

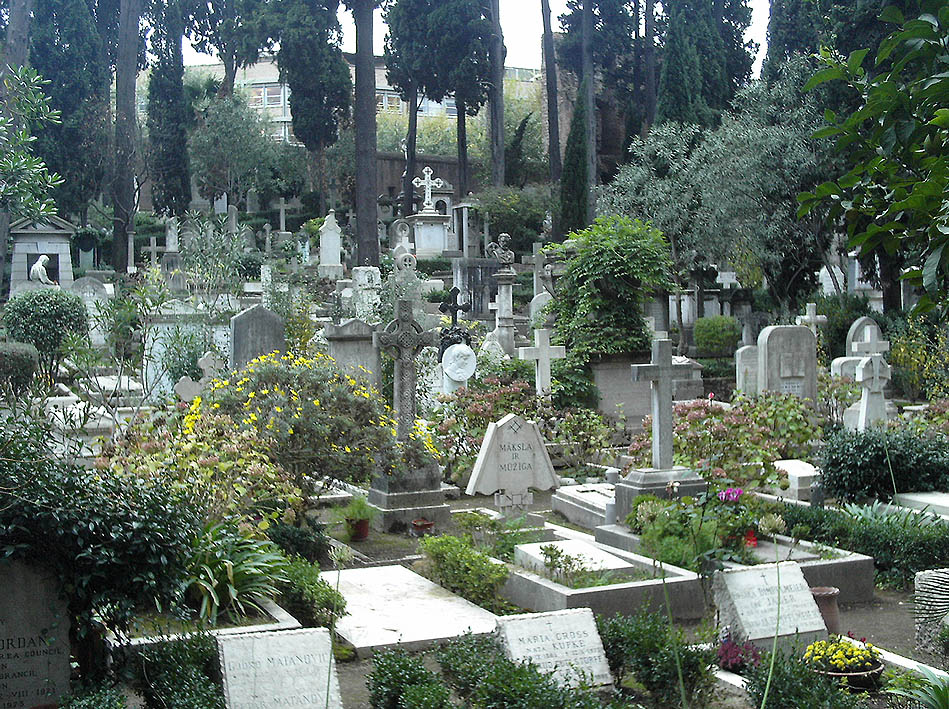
Remond is interred at the Cimitero Acattolico in Rome.

Remond continued her studies at London University College, graduating as a nurse. In 1866, she left England and, after visiting Switzerland, in 1867, at the age of 42, she moved permanently to Florence. She entered the Santa Maria Nuova Hospital school as a medical student. At the time, the school was one of the most prestigious medical schools in Europe. Remond graduated in August 1868. After completing her studies and becoming a doctor, she remained in Florence for many years, then resided in Rome. Remond practiced medicine for more than 20 years, never returning to the United States. Her sister Caroline and Maritcha joined her from the United States. Frederick Douglass met the three women while visiting Rome in 1886.

In Italy, on April 25, 1877, Remond married Lazzaro Pintor (1833–1913), an Italian office worker originally from Sardinia. By the 1880s, Remond Pintor had moved to Rome.

Remond died on December 13, 1894, in Rome. She is interred at the Protestant Cemetery in Rome.

== Tribute ==
In 1999, the Massachusetts State House honored six outstanding women of the state by installing a series of six tall marble panels with a bronze bust in each; the busts are of Remond, Dorothea Dix, Florence Luscomb, Mary Kenney O'Sullivan, Josephine St. Pierre Ruffin, and Lucy Stone. Two quotations from each of these women are etched on their own marble panel. The wall behind the panels has wallpaper made of six government documents repeated over and over, with each document being related to a cause of one or more of the women.

In 2016, Royal Holloway Students' Union introduced the "Sarah Parker Remond Inclusion and Accessibility Award" in their Society Awards for a society that has demonstrated "outstanding effort to ensure that their activities are as accessible as possible and made a significant effort to promote an inclusive attitude within their membership and in the wider campus community."

The 2019 anthology New Daughters of Africa, edited by Margaret Busby, includes two pieces by Sarah Parker Remond: "Why Slavery is Still Rampant" and "The Negro Race in America" (a letter to the editor of The Daily News, London, in 1866). Additionally, her legacy informs Delia Jarrett-Macauley's contribution to the anthology, "The Bedford Women", which recounts Remond's story.

In 2020, the University College London renamed its Centre for the Study of Racism & Racialisation the "UCL Sarah Parker Remond Centre", with Professor Paul Gilroy as its Founding Director.

The best-selling novel La linea del colori: Il Grand Tour di Lafanu Brown, by Somalian writer Igiaba Scego (Florence: Giunti, 2020), in Italian, combines the characters of African-American sculptor Edmonia Lewis and Sarah Parker Remond and is dedicated to Rome and to these two figures.

In 2021, the University of Chester detailed plans to relocate the majority of its teaching provision to Warrington town center, housed in a property newly renamed the Sarah Parker Remond Building. In April 2023, the relocation was celebrated with the unveiling of a blue heritage plaque in honor of Remond.

In September 2021, Remond was honored in Wakefield, West Yorkshire, where she spoke on her 1859–1860 tour of England and Ireland campaigning against the evils of enslavement, having been invited by Elizabeth Dawson of the Wakefield Ladies' Anti-Slavery Society. After Remond delivered her lecture, the mixed-gender Wakefield Anti-Slavery Association was established on January 12, 1860, at the Corn Exchange.

In 2022, the unveiling in London of a Nubian Jak Community Trust commemorative blue plaque in her honour was announced, taking place on March 25.

In 2023, The Guardian commissioned a portrait of Remond by Claudette Johnson as part of its Cotton Capital project.

In 2025, the exhibition The Warp/ The Weft/ The Wake at Manchester Art Gallery included a work by artist Holly Graham to commemorate when Remond made a speech on the site in 1859. The installation was a blue cotton dress printed with text about the abolition of slavery.
