= Michelle Nouri =

Italian journalist and author

- ميشيل نوري
- Born: October 17, 1973 (age 53); Prague, Czechoslovakia
- Occupations: Journalist, author
- Notable work: The girl in Baghdad

Michelle Raghdee Nouri (Arabic:ميشيل رغدي نوري; born October 17, 1973) is an Italian journalist and author, most known for her first memoir, The girl from Baghdad, which highlights her childhood in Baghdad, fleeing Iraq, and her arrival in Italy. Her second memoir, Il cammino delle foglie di tè ("The path of tea leaves"), covers her integration into the West.

== Biography ==
Nouri was born in Prague to an Iraqi Muslim father from Baghdad and a Catholic Czech mother. Six months after her birth, she moved with her parents to Baghdad where they lived until she was sixteen. Soon after the Gulf War erupted, Nouri's father divorced her mother, who decided to travel back to Prague with Nouri and her sisters in 1988 after the fall of communism. Nouri then left at the age of eighteen to settle in Italy.

Her publications involve the intercultural dialogue between both Islam and Christianity, the two religions she grew up with; in addition to the differing cultures she has been exposed to. Nouri currently works with various newspapers, and has revealed her story in two autobiographies, The girl from Baghdad, 2007 and The path of tea leaves, 2010.

She was also known for having "flirted" with the late Uday Hussein, former Iraqi president Saddam Hussein's eldest son.

== Publications ==
- La ragazza di Baghdad ("The girl in Baghdad"), 2007
- Il cammino delle foglie di tè, 2010
