= Randa Ghazy =

Italian writer of Egyptian origins

Randa Ghazy (born 4 August 1986 in Saronno) is an Italian writer of Egyptian origins.

== Biography ==
Ghazy was born in Italy on the 4 August 1986 to Egyptian parents and studied International Relations at the University of Milan. In 2002 at the age of 15 she wrote her first novel “Sognando Palestina” (Dreaming of Palestine), which has been translated in 16 languages. The book had its share of controversy and criticism. Ghazy wrote the book based on news reports and her own research. The book told the story of a group of young Palestinians who have a tough life in the Israel-occupied region of the West Bank and Gaza. The protagonists of the story are oppressed by the Israelis. This portrayal drew angry criticism from Jewish critics who thought the book incited hatred against the Jews, prompting extremist acts like suicide bombings against Israeli targets. There were calls in France to ban the book.

== Bibliography ==
Year	Title	Translation	Notes
2002	Sognando Palestina	Dreaming of Palestine: A Novel of Friendship, Love & War	A portrait of a friendship between a group of young people who live in the occupied territories of Gaza
2005	Prova a sanguinare. Quattro ragazzi, un treno, la vita	Try to Bleed: Four kids, a Train, Life	
2007	Oggi forse non ammazzo nessuno. Storie minime di una giovane musulmana stranamente non terrorista	Today I'm not Going to Kill Anyone: Short Stories of a Young Muslim and Non-terrorist	
