= Marco Perrone =

Italian engineer

- Occupation: Engineer
- Title: Racing Bulls Sporting Director

Marco Perrone is an Italian Formula One engineer. He is the Sporting Director at the Racing Bulls Formula One team.

== Career ==
Perrone joined Scuderia Toro Rosso in 2008, shortly after graduating with a degree in Mechanical Engineering at the University of Rome Tor Vergata. He began his career as an R&D Engineer, working on component design and structural calculations within the team’s research and development department. In 2011, he moved into the role of Vehicle Dynamics Engineer, contributing to simulation development and testing activities, including wind tunnel and rig testing, while also serving as a Test Data Engineer during track sessions.

Perrone transitioned to the race team in 2013 as a Strategy Engineer, where he was responsible for competitor analysis, tyre modelling, and pit wall operations. When Toro Rosso established a dedicated race strategy department, he was promoted to Head of Strategy in 2015, a role he continued through the team’s rebranding to Scuderia AlphaTauri in 2020.

In 2022, Perrone became Head of Sporting Direction, taking on wider operational and regulatory responsibilities within the team. He was appointed Sporting Director of the renamed Racing Bulls team in 2024, overseeing the team’s sporting operations and liaison with the FIA.
