= Caroline Remond Putnam =

American businesswoman and abolitionist (1826–1908)

- Born: c. 1826; Massachusetts, USA
- Died: 1908
- Occupations: Businesswoman and Hair salonist
- Spouse: Joseph H. Putnam
- Children: Edmund Quincy Putnam; Louisa Victoria Putnam
- Parents: John Remond (father); Nancy Lenox (mother)
- Relatives: Sarah Parker Remond (sister); Charles Lenox Remond (brother); Cecelia Remond Babcock (sister); Maritcha Juan Remond (sister)

Caroline Remond Putnam (c. 1826–1908) was an African-American businesswoman and abolitionist in Salem, Massachusetts. Along with two of her sisters, she owned and operated the largest wig factory in the state, making her mark on the growing field of hair-care products for African-American women.

== Early life and education ==
Caroline was the youngest of seven children born to African-American parents Nancy (Lenox) Remond, a baker and cake decorator, and John Remond, a merchant and caterer. The Remonds were one of Salem's most successful entrepreneurial families, and they often associated with prominent abolitionists like Frederick Douglass and Charlotte Forten Grimké.

Caroline had four sisters and two brothers, including the anti-slavery orators Sarah Parker Remond and Charles Lenox Remond. The Remonds encouraged education for both boys and girls, but the children nevertheless faced racial discrimination at school. When Caroline was nine years old, she and her siblings were forced to leave their Salem school in response to protests from white parents. The Remonds moved to Newport, Rhode Island so the children could complete their education. They returned to Massachusetts around 1841, and John Remond successfully lobbied to desegregate Salem's schools.

Caroline married Joseph Hall Putnam, a Boston schoolteacher and hairdresser who shared her abolitionist beliefs. The couple had two children, Edmund Quincy Putnam and Louisa Victoria Putnam. Joseph died in January 1859, and Louisa Victoria followed three months later.

== Entrepreneurship and activism ==
Along with her husband and her older sisters Cecilia Remond Babcock and Maritcha Juan Remond, Caroline owned and ran nearly every Black hairdressing business in Salem, including the Ladies Hair Work Salon. The sisters, who had all received training in the art of ornamental wig making, also owned and operated the largest wig factory in the state. In the late 1840s, Caroline began producing Mrs. Putnam's Medicated Hair Tonic, which was widely sold and advertised as a medicine to stop hair loss. She gained respect and recognition as an authority on Black haircare, and other entrepreneurs often requested her endorsements for their hair products.

The success of the Salon and the wig factory allowed Putnam to provide financial support for her siblings Sarah Parker Remond and Charles Lenox Remond, who often undertook abolitionist lecture tours together. Caroline sometimes joined Sarah in protesting racism and segregationist policies. On one occasion in 1853, the sisters purchased tickets to an opera at the Howard Athenaeum in Boston, but were told they could only sit in the theater's gallery with the other Black patrons. Sarah took the case to the First District Court of Essex County, Massachusetts, ultimately winning five hundred dollars in damages for the two sisters.

Putnam herself was an active member of the Salem Female Anti-Slavery Society, and was elected vice president in 1865. Like her sisters, she was a member and sponsor of various other abolitionist groups, including the Essex County Anti-Slavery Society and the American Anti-Slavery Society. Putnam also opened her Salem home to fellow Black abolitionists and intellectuals, including Charlotte Forten Grimké, who lived with Putnam when she first arrived in Salem in 1854.

== Later life ==
Shortly after the deaths of her husband and daughter, Putnam left her Salem businesses in the hands of her sisters Cecelia and Maritcha and joined Sarah Parker Remond in her travels across Europe. By 1865, she had settled in Vienna, where her son Edmund studied medicine. In 1885, Caroline and Edmund, joined by Maritcha, moved to Rome to live permanently with Sarah, who had trained as a physician and established a medical practice there. The sisters continued their anti-slavery activism in Italy, maintaining connections with American and European abolitionists and hosting Frederick Douglass at their home in 1886. Caroline also passed her abolitionist convictions along to her son, who worked as a foreign correspondent for the National Anti-Slavery Standard while a student in Europe.

Despite her wealth and elite social status in Salem, Putnam faced racism wherever she traveled. When she sailed to England for the first time in 1859, the captain of the Europa denied her first-class passenger status. In response, Putnam wrote to Samuel Cunard and sent the correspondence to the press. When she returned to the United States on the Arabia, she traveled as a first-class passenger. On another occasion, in 1870, Putnam was turned away from New York's Metropolitan Hotel, which did not revoke its segregationist policies until 1879.

Caroline, Sarah, and Maritcha later moved to London, where they lived together until Sarah's death in 1894. Caroline Remond Putnam died in 1908.
