= Laila Soufyane =

Italian runner (born 1983)

Personal information
- Nationality: Italian
- Born: 4 August 1983 (age 42) Beni Oujjine, Morocco
- Height: 1.60 m (5 ft 3 in)
- Weight: 42 kg (93 lb)

Sport
- Country: Italy
- Sport: Athletics
- Event: Long-distance running
- Club: G.S. Esercito
- Coached by: Marco Romano

Achievements and titles
- Personal bests: 10 km road: 33:13 (2017); Half marathon: 1:12:43 (2015)
Medal record
European Championships
Silver medal – second place	2016 Amsterdam	Half marathon team

Laila Soufyane (born 4 August 1983) is a born Moroccan Italian female long-distance runner, who won two Italian championships.

== National titles ==
- Italian Athletics Championships
  - 10 km road: 2014
  - Half marathon: 2015

== See also ==
- Naturalized athletes of Italy
