= Richard Basha =

Egyptian footballer (born 2002)

Personal information
- Full name: Richard Reda Mostafa Basha
- Date of birth: 7 March 2002 (age 24)
- Place of birth: Verona, Italy
- Position: Forward

Youth career
- AC Milan
- Juventus
- 2016: Sharm El Sheikh Sporting Club
- 2016–2018: Al Ahly
- 2018–2021: Udinese
- 2021: Lugano

Senior career*
Years	Team	Apps	(Gls)
2021–2022	Team Ticino	1	(0)

International career^{‡}
	Egypt U19	5	(7)
- * Club domestic league appearances and goals as of 2 May 2022 ‡ National team caps and goals as of 2 May 2022

Richard Reda Mostafa Basha (Arabic: ريتشارد رضا مصطفي باشا; born 7 March 2002), known as Richard Basha, is a professional footballer who plays as a forward.

== Club career ==
Born in Verona, Italy, to an Egyptian father and Italian mother, Basha started his career with Italian giants AC Milan and Juventus. Due to his father's work, Basha relocated to South Sinai, Egypt, where he played for Sharm El Sheikh Sporting Club. He was soon scouted and signed by Egyptian top division side Al Ahly in 2016.

In 2017, Basha's father stated that he would remain in Egypt with Al Ahly, after interest from former club Juventus. Despite this, Basha did return to Italy, joining Udinese in 2018.

In August 2021, Basha joined Swiss Super League club Lugano.

== International career ==
Basha is eligible to represent both Italy and Egypt at the international level. He has represented Egypt at youth international level.

== Personal life ==
Richard's brother, Salah, is also a footballer, and moved to Udinese from Al Ahly with him.

== Career statistics ==
=== Club ===
As of 2 May 2022.

Club	Season	League			Cup		Other		Total	
Club	Season	Division	Apps	Goals	Apps	Goals	Apps	Goals	Apps	Goals
Team Ticino	2021–22	Swiss 1. Liga	1	0	–		0	0	1	0
Career total			1	0	0	0	0	0	1	0
