= Manuel Cominotto =

Italian long-distance runner

Personal information
- Nationality: Italian
- Born: 18 December 1990 (age 35) Monselice, Italy

Sport
- Country: Italy
- Sport: Athletics
- Event: Long-distance running
- Club: C.S. Esercito

Achievements and titles
- Personal bests: 10 km road: 29:26 (2013); Half marathon: 1:05:09 (2014)

Manuel Cominotto (born 18 December 1990) is an Italian male long-distance runner, who won an Italian championships in 2015.

== National titles ==
- Italian Athletics Championships
  - 10 km road: 2015
