= Marouan Razine =

Moroccan-Italian long-distance runner

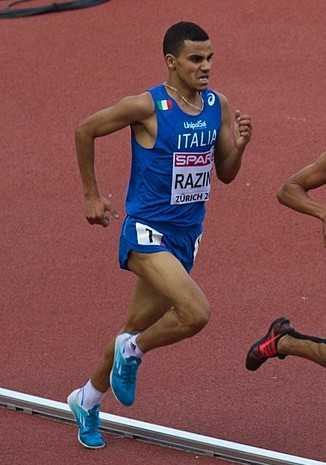

Personal information
- Nationality: Italian
- Born: 9 April 1991 (age 35) Tétouan, Morocco
- Height: 1.73 m (5 ft 8 in)
- Weight: 60 kg (132 lb)

Sport
- Country: Italy
- Sport: Athletics
- Event: Long-distance running
- Club: G.S. Esercito
- Coached by: Gianni Crepaldi

Achievements and titles
- Personal best: 5000 m: 13:28.07 (2017)
Medal record
European Cross Country Championships
Bronze medal – third place	2014 Samokov	Team

Marouan Razine (born 9 April 1991) is a Moroccan-born Italian long-distance runner, who won three Italian championships.

== Achievements ==
Year	Competition	Venue	Rank	Event	Time	Notes
2017	European Indoor Championships	(Serbia) Belgrade	6th	3000 m	8:04.19	

== National titles ==
- Italian Athletics Championships
  - 5000 m: 2014, 2015, 2018, 2019
  - 10 km road: 2016

== See also ==
- Naturalized athletes of Italy
