= Igiaba Scego =

Italian writer and activist (born 1974)

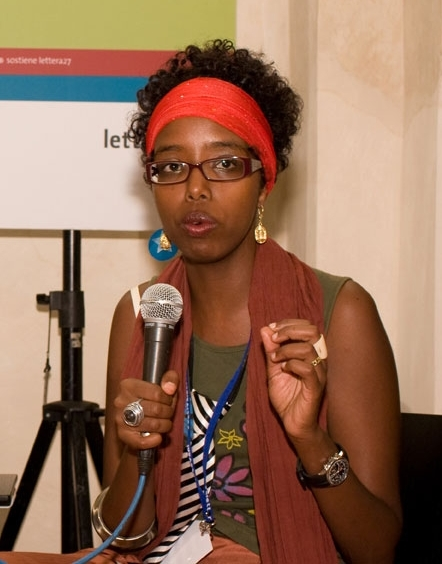
- Scego speaking at Festivaletteratura.
- Born: 20 March 1974 (age 52); Rome, Italy
- Education: La Sapienza University of Rome; Roma Tre University
- Occupations: Writer, journalist and activist
- Family: Ali Omar Scego, father; Soraya Omar-Scego, niece
- Awards: Premio Mondello

Igiaba Scego (born 20 March 1974) is an Italian writer, journalist, and activist.

== Biography ==
Igiaba Scego was born in Rome, Italy, in 1974, after her parents were forced to flee Somalia following the 1969 coup d'état of Siad Barre; Scego's father, Ali Omar Scego, was a Somali politician, and her great-grandfather, Omar, was a translator for Rodolfo Graziani. She graduated in Foreign Literature at La Sapienza University of Rome and obtained a PhD in pedagogy at Roma Tre University. Presently, she is writing about and researching cultural dialogue and migration.

== Works ==
She writes for various magazines dealing with migrant literature and African literature, such as Latinoamerica, Carta, El Ghibli and Migra. Her works include autobiographical references, and they depict the delicate balance between her two cultural realities, the Italian and Somali.

In 2003, she won the Eks & Tra prize for migrant writers with her story "Salsicce", and published her debut novel, La nomade che amava Alfred Hitchcock. In 2006, she attended the Literature festival in Mantua.

Scego collaborates with newspapers such as La Repubblica and Il manifesto and contributes to the magazine Nigrizia with an opinion column, titled "The colors of Eve". In 2007, along with Ingy Mubiayi, she edited the short-story collection Quando nasci è una roulette. Giovani figli di migranti si raccontano. It follows the story of seven boys and girls of African origin, who were born in Rome of foreign parents or came to Italy when young.

In 2011, she won the Premio Mondello with her book La mia casa è dove sono, which was published the previous year by Rizzoli. In 2017, her novel Adua was translated into English by Jamie Richards, and in 2019, Aaron Robertson translated her book Oltre Babilonia, again into English, with the title Beyond Babylon. Reviewing it for the Los Angeles Review of Books, Kelsey McFaul wrote: "Rather than suggesting that 'beyond Babylon' is a destination, the novel expresses the material and relational afterlives of resilience, anti-colonization, and collective racial solidarity in the present. Scego's genius is to scale from the international to the intimate, from memory and materiality to music, mothers, and menstruation, the 'rhythm that transports me into a cosmic chaos that appears to be my own.'"

Scego's 2020 novel, La linea del colore, combines the characters of Edmonia Lewis and Sarah Parker Remond and is dedicated to Rome and to these two African-American women who lived in the city during the 19th century.

== Bibliography ==
- La nomade che amava Alfred Hitchcock, Rome: Edizioni Sinnos, 2003.
- Rhoda, Rome: Edizioni Sinnos, 2004.
- Pecore nere. Racconti with Gabriela Kuruvilla, Ingy Mubiayi, Laila Wadia, Roma-Bari, Laterza, 2005.
- (Edited with Ingy Mubiayi) Quando nasci è una roulette. Giovani figli di migranti si raccontano, Edizioni Terre di Mezzo, 2007.
- Amori Bicolori. Racconti, Roma, Edizioni Laterza, 2007.
- Oltre Babilonia, Donzelli Editore, 2008. English translation (by Aaron Robertson): Beyond Babylon, Two Lines Press, 2019.
- L'albero in Nessuna Pietà, Salani editore, 2009.
- La mia casa è dove sono, Rizzoli, 2010. Libro autobiografico che descrive una famiglia dispersa tra Somalia, Gran Bretagna e Italia.
- Roma Negata, with Rino Bianchi. Ediesse, 2014.
- Adua, Giunti, 2015. Translated into English by Jamie Richard, New Vessel Press, 2017, ISBN 978-1939931450.
- La linea del colore, Bompiani, 2020. Translated into English by John Cullen and Gregory Conti, Other Press LLC, 2022, ISBN 9781635420869.
- Cassandra a Mogadiscio, Bompiani, 2023.

== English translations ==
- Adua. Translated by Jamie Richards. New Vessel Press, 2017.
- Beyond Babylon. Translated by Aaron Robertson. Two Lines Press, 2019.
- The Color Line. Translated by John Cullen and Gregory Conti, Other Press LLC, 2022, ISBN 9781635420869.
