= Alessio Guarini =

Italian long jumper

Personal information
- National team: Italy: 2 (2009)
- Born: 5 April 1985 (age 41) Bologna, Italy

Sport
- Sport: Athletics
- Event: Long jump
- Club: Fiamme Oro

Achievements and titles
- Personal bests: Long jump outdoor: 8.00 m (2013); Long jump indoor: 7.83 m (2014)

Alessio Guarini (born 5 April 1985) is a former Italian long jumper. He was a two-time national champion at the senior level in the long jump, in 2009 and 2013.
