= Salah Basha =

Egyptian footballer (born 2003)

Personal information
- Full name: Salah El Din Reda Mostafa Bashasha
- Date of birth: 5 March 2003 (age 23)
- Place of birth: Verona, Italy
- Height: 1.73 m (5 ft 8 in)
- Position: Forward

Youth career
- AC Milan
- Juventus
- 2016: Sharm El Sheikh SC
- 2016–2018: Al Ahly
- 2018–2023: Udinese

Senior career*
Years	Team	Apps	(Gls)
2023	Giugliano	1	(0)
2023–2025	Pharco	8	(0)

International career
- Egypt U17
- Egypt U20
- * Club domestic league appearances and goals as of 6 January 2026

Salah El Din Reda Mostafa Bashasha (Arabic: صلاح الدين رضا مصطفي باشا; born 5 March 2003), known as Salah Basha, is a professional footballer who plays as a forward. Born in Italy, he is a youth international for Egypt.

== Club career ==
Born in Verona, Italy, to an Egyptian father and Italian mother, Basha started his career with Italian giants AC Milan and Juventus. Due to his father's work, Basha relocated to South Sinai, Egypt, where he played for Sharm El Sheikh Sporting Club. He was soon scouted and signed by Egyptian top division side Al Ahly in 2016.

Having lived in Egypt with his mother and brother, Basha returned to Italy when his father became sick. On his return, he signed for Serie A side Udinese, who he had trialled with in January 2018. He was named on the bench for Udinese for the first time in the penultimate game of the 2020–21 Serie A season, a 1–0 loss to Sampdoria, but did not feature.

On 27 January 2023, Basha signed with Giugliano in Serie C. However, after just one Serie C appearance, Basha returned to Egypt, signing with Pharco in September of the same year. Initially scouted by the Egyptian Olympic team, after just a year with the club it was revealed that he had lost the confidence of Pharco's coaches and was only participating in friendly matches.

== International career ==
Basha is eligible to represent both Italy and Egypt at international level. He has represented Egypt at youth international level. Basha represented Egypt at the 2022 Arab Cup U-20, helping Egypt to the final with three goals, including one in their final loss to Saudi Arabia.

== Personal life ==
Salah's brother, Richard, is also a footballer, and moved to Udinese with him before leaving to join Swiss Super League club Lugano in 2021.

== Career statistics ==
=== Club ===
As of 24 December 2025.

Appearances and goals by club, season and competition
Club	Season	League			National Cup (Note: Includes Coppa Italia and Egypt Cup)		League Cup (Note: Includes Coppa Italia Serie C and Egyptian League Cup)		Other		Total	
Club	Season	Division	Apps	Goals	Apps	Goals	Apps	Goals	Apps	Goals	Apps	Goals
Giugliano	2022–23	Serie C	1	0	0	0	0	0	0	0	1	0
Pharco	2023–24	Egyptian Premier League	4	0	0	0	0	0	0	0	4	0
Pharco	2024–25	Egyptian Premier League	4	0	1	0	0	0	0	0	5	0
Pharco	Total		8	0	1	0	0	0	0	0	9	0
Career total			9	0	1	0	0	0	0	0	10	0
