= Mohamed Laqouahi =

Italian long-distance runner

Personal information
- Nationality: Italian
- Born: 16 March 1978 (age 48) Morocco

Sport
- Country: Italy
- Sport: Athletics
- Event: Long-distance running
- Club: Reggio Event’s

Achievements and titles
- Personal bests: 10 km road: 28:52 (2013); Half marathon: 1:03:29 (2013)

Mohamed Laqouahi (born 16 March 1978) is a born Moroccan former Italian male long-distance runner, who won an Italian championships in 2013.

== National titles ==
- Italian Athletics Championships
  - 10 km road: 2013

== See also ==
- Naturalized athletes of Italy
