= Raffaella Lamera =

Italian high jumper (born 1983)

Personal information
- Nationality: Italian
- Born: 13 April 1983 (age 43) Romano di Lombardia, Italy
- Height: 1.75 m (5 ft 9 in)
- Weight: 56 kg (123 lb)

Sport
- Country: Italy
- Sport: Athletics
- Event: High jump

Achievements and titles
- Personal best: High jump: 1.95 m (2010)

Raffaella Lamera (born 13 April 1983) is an Italian female high jumper, who participated at the 2011 World Championships in Athletics.

== Achievements ==
Year	Competition	Venue	Position	Event	Performance	Notes
2011	World Championships	(South Korea) Daegu	25th Qual.	High jump	1.85 m	

== National titles ==
She won 6 national championships at senior level.

- Italian Athletics Championships
  - High jump: 2009, 2011
- Italian Indoor Athletics Championships
  - High jump: 2008, 2010, 2011, 2012

== See also ==
- Italian all-time top lists - High jump
