= Ingy Mubiayi =

Egyptian-born Italian writer (born 1973)

- Born: Ingy Mubiayi Kakese; 27 June 1973 (age 52); Cairo, Egypt
- Occupations: Writer, language teacher
- Years active: 2000–present
- Known for: migrant narratives

Ingy Mubiayi (born 27 June 1972) is an Egyptian-born Italian writer. She focuses her works on migrants and has become a voice of the Italian-African diaspora. In 2004, she was the recipient of the Eks & Tra prize for migrant writers for her work "Documenti, prego". In addition to her writing, Mubiayi teaches Italian and Arabic and has worked as a translator.

== Biography ==
Ingy Mubiayi Kakese was born on 27 June 1973 to a Congolese father and Egyptian mother in Cairo, Egypt, where she lived until she was four years old. Moving to Rome, Italy, in 1977, she first attended a French school as her spoken languages were French and Arabic. When her sister was confused by the multi-lingual household, her parents imposed a rule of only speaking Italian and she lost her earlier two languages. Mubiayi attended the Sapienza University of Rome, graduating with a degree in the History of Islamic Culture. In 2000, she opened a bookshop called Modus Legendi in the Primavalle neighborhood of Rome focusing on intercultural and migrant literature. In 2003, Mubiayi began teaching Italian to immigrants with the Association Sociocultural Villa Carpegna and since 2004, she has taught Arabic at the 1° Circolo Didattico "P.Maffi".

Mubiayi's works discuss the experience of second-generation Italians, who are both part of and separated from Italian culture. Her stories evaluate what it is to be Italian in a world where migration, gender and racism differ among cultures. In addition to writing for anthologies, she has published works in the journal Internazionale and served as a translator. In 2004, she was the recipient of the Eks & Tra prize for migrant writers for her work "Documenti, prego" which then appeared in the anthology La seconda pelle. She hosts a radio show on Vita Trentina Radio discussing identity.

In 2007, Mubiayi jointly edited and published with Igiaba Scego a series of interviews with Afro-Italian writers about their migration experiences entitled, Quando nasci è una roulette: Giovani figli di migranti si raccontano (When You’re Born It’s a Crapshoot: Young Children of Migrants Tell their Stories). In 2009, she was a featured speaker at the International Women's Day presentation in Capannori with her work, Parole migrate (Words Migrate).

== Selected works ==
- Mubiayi, Ingy (2004). "Documenti, prego". In Sangiorgi, Roberta (ed.). La seconda pelle (in Italian). Bologna, Italy: Eks & tra. OCLC 606497351.
- Mubiayi, Ingy (2005). "Concorso". In Capitani, Flavia; Coen, Emanuele (eds.). Pecore nere: racconti (in Italian). Rome, Italy: GLF editori Laterza. ISBN 978-8-842-07797-8.
- Mubiayi, Ingy (March 2005). "Fiori e scarafaggi". Nuovi Argomenti: Fuori Casa (in Italian) (29). l'Istituto Grafico Tiberino, Rome, Italy: Arnoldo Mondadori Editore Spa: 108–115.
- Mubiayi, Ingy (2005). "La famiglia". In Scego, Igiaba (ed.). Italiani per vocazione (in Italian). Fiesole, Italy: Cadmo. ISBN 978-8-879-23331-6.
- Mubiayi, Ingy (2005). "Rimorso". In Gnisci, Armando (ed.). Allattati dalla lupa: scritture migranti (in Italian). Rome, Italy: Sinnos editrice. ISBN 978-8-876-09051-6.
- Mubiayi, Ingy (June 2005). "L'incontro". El-Ghibli (in Italian). 2 (8).
- Scego, Igiaba; Mubiayi, Ingy (2007). Quando nasci è una roulette: giovani figli di migranti si raccontano (in Italian). Milan, Italy: Terre di mezzo. ISBN 978-8-861-89007-7.
- Mubiayi, Ingy (2008). "Nascita". In Capitani, Flavia; Coen, Emanuele (eds.). Amori bicolori: racconti (in Italian). Rome, Italy: GLF editori Laterza. ISBN 978-8-842-08578-2.
- Mubiayi, Ingy (2008). "Uno sguardo al 'contrario': l'ironia come strategia letteraria". In Camilotti, Silvia (ed.). Lingue e letterature in movimento : scrittrici emergenti nel panorama letterario italiano contemporaneo (in Italian) (1st ed.). Bologna, Italy: Bononia University Press. ISBN 978-8-873-95417-0.
- Mubiayi, Ingy (2009). Parole migrate (in Italian).
