= Domenico Ricatti =

Italian long-distance runner

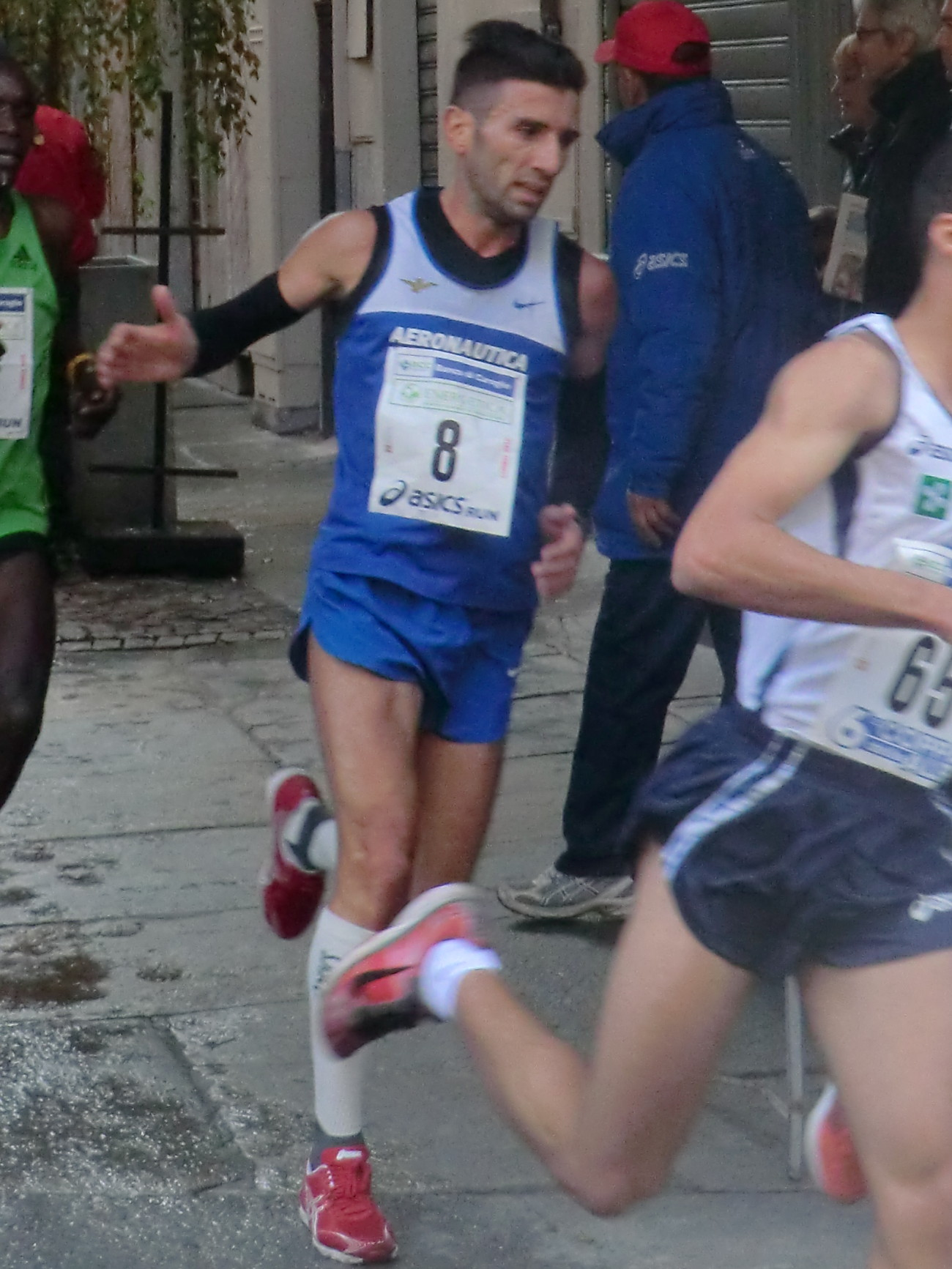

Personal information
- Nickname: Mimmo
- Nationality: Italian
- Born: 16 May 1979 (age 47) Barletta

Sport
- Country: Italy
- Sport: Athletics
- Event: Long-distance running
- Club: C.S. Aeronautica Militare

Achievements and titles
- Personal bests: Half marathon: 1:03:38 (2015); 10K run: 29:23 (2015); Marathon: 2:15:07 (2014)

Domenico Ricatti (born 16 May 1979) is an Italian male long-distance runner who won three times the national championships at senior level.

== Achievements ==
Year	Competition	Venue	Rank	Event	Time	Notes
2014	European Championships	(Switzerland) Zürich	DNF	Marathon	No time	

== National titles ==
- Italian Athletics Championships
  - 10,000 metres: 2011, 2014
  - 10 km road: 2012
