= Najibe Salami =

Italian long-distance runner

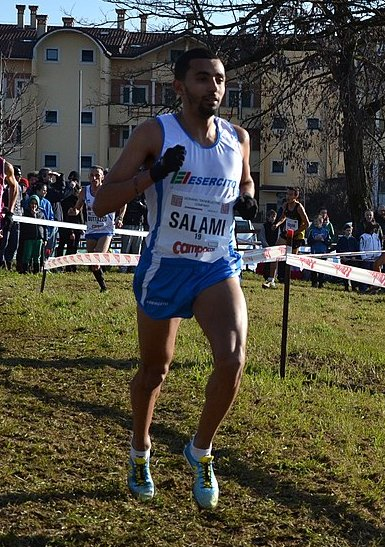

Personal information
- Full name: Marco Najibe Salami
- Nationality: Italian
- Born: 7 July 1985 (age 40) Ostiglia, Italy
- Height: 1.69 m (5 ft 7 in)
- Weight: 57 kg (126 lb)

Sport
- Country: Italy
- Sport: Athletics
- Event: Long-distance running
- Club: G.S. Esercito
- Coached by: Claudio Guizzardi

Achievements and titles
- Personal best: 5000 m: 13:37.62 (2017)
Medal record
European 10,000m Cup
Gold medal – first place	2015 Cagliari	Team
Gold medal – first place	2016 Mersin	Team
Silver medal – second place	2017 Minsk	Team

Najibe Salami (born 7 July 1985), also called Marco which is the Italian version of the Arabic Najibe, is an Italian male long-distance runner, who won five Italian championships.

== Biography ==
Born in Italy from father Moroccan and mother of Gibraltar, he obtained Italian citizenship only in 2004 when he was already of age.

== National titles ==
- Italian Athletics Championships
  - 5000 m: 2017
  - 10 km road: 2018
- Italian Athletics Indoor Championships
  - 1500 m: 2011, 2013
  - 3000 m: 2007

== See also ==
- Naturalized athletes of Italy
