= Fatna Maraoui =

Italian long-distance runner

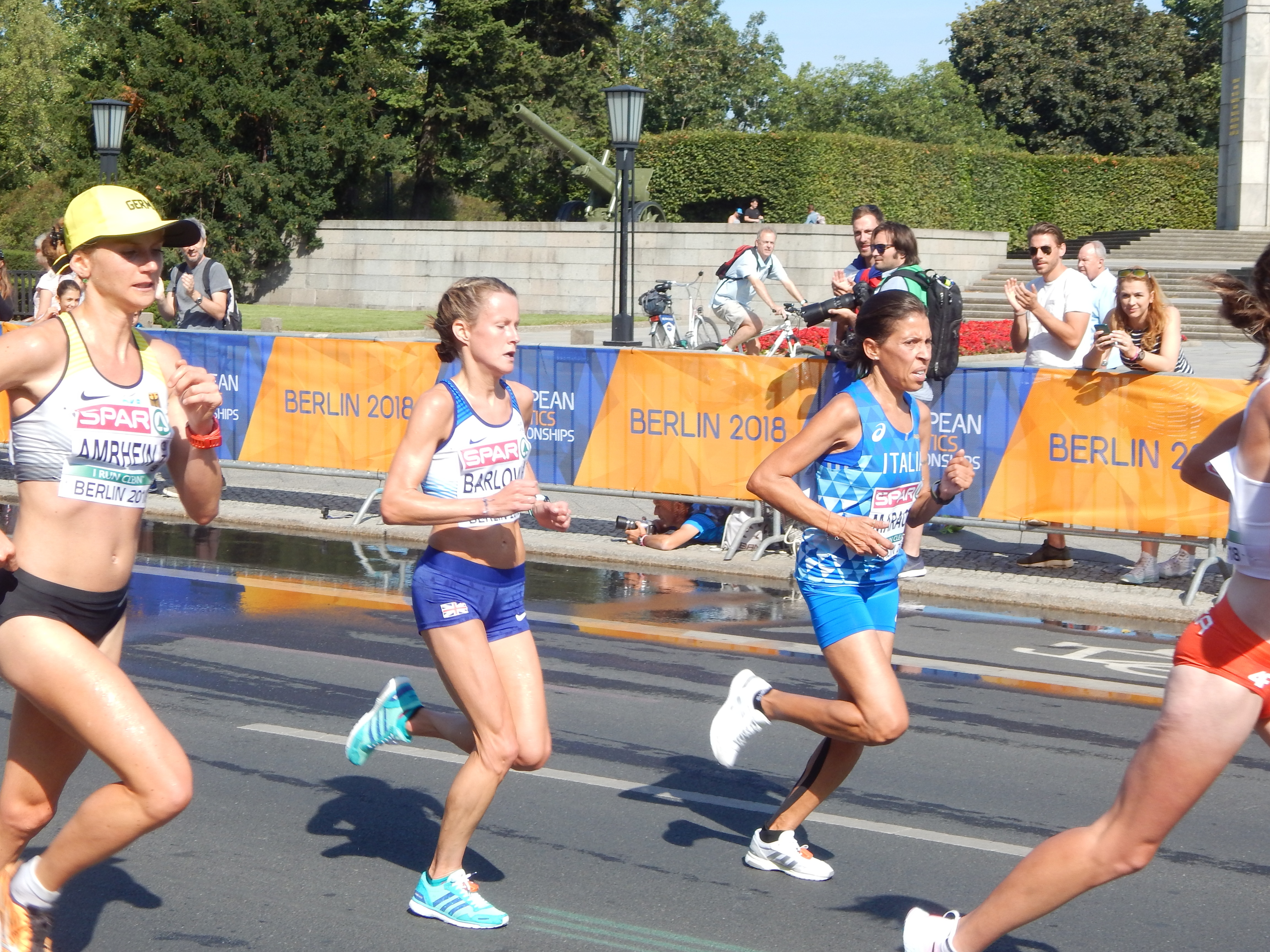
- Fatna Maraoui (with Italy jersey) at Berlin 2018 during the marathon.

Personal information
- Nationality: Italian
- Born: 10 July 1977 (age 48) Beni Betaou, Morocco

Sport
- Country: Italy
- Sport: Athletics
- Event: Long-distance running
- Club: G.S. Esercito

Achievements and titles
- Personal bests: 5000 m: 15:42.21 (2006); 10,000 m: 33:05.79 (2007); 5 km road: 16:27 (2017); 10 km road: 32:38 (2007); Half marathon: 1:10:08 (2011); Marathon: 2:30:50 (2015)

Fatna Maraoui (born 10 July 1977) is a Moroccan-born female Italian long-distance runner who competed at two editions of the IAAF World Cross Country Championships at senior level (2008, 2011). and also two of editions the IAAF World Half Marathon Championships (2011, 2014).

She is the sister of Rakiya Maraoui-Quétier born Moroccan female French long-distance runner, ten years older, former member of the France national athletics team.

== Biography ==
She was naturalized Italian by marriage from 2003. She won three editions of the absolute Italian Championship in the 10 km road race.

== National titles ==
- Italian 10 km road Championship
  - 10 km road race: 2016, 2017, 2019

== See also ==
- Italian all-time lists - Half marathon
- Naturalized athletes of Italy
