= Touria Samiri =

Italian athletics competitor (born 1988)

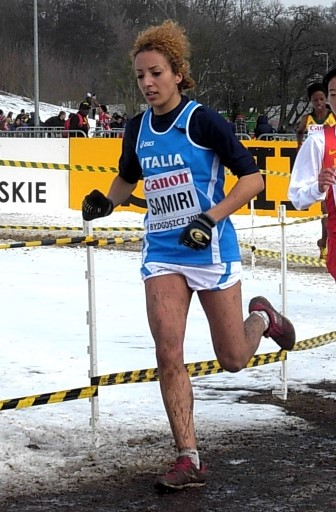
- Touria Samiri at the 2013 World Cross Country Championships

Personal information
- Nationality: Italian
- Born: 1 February 1988 (age 38) Khouribga, Morocco
- Height: 1.66 m (5 ft 5 in)
- Weight: 54 kg (119 lb)

Sport
- Country: Italy (3 caps)
- Sport: Athletics
- Event(s): Middle-distance running 3000 metres steeplechase
- Club: Fanfulla Lodigiana

Achievements and titles
- Personal bests: 1500 m: 4:14.85 (2013); 3000 m s'chase: 10:01.23 (2013)

Touria Samiri (born 1 February 1988) is a female Moroccan-born Italian middle distance runner and steeplechase runner who competed at one edition of the IAAF World Cross Country Championships at senior level (2013).

== Biography ==
Her best season was the 2013, when she won one national championships at individual senior level (cross country running). and was finalist at 2013 Mediterranean Games, thanks to these results she got azzurra jersey for the World Cross Country Championships.

== Achievements ==
Year	Competition	Venue	Position	Event	Time	Notes
2013	World Cross Country Championships	(Poland) Bydgoszcz	89th	Senior race (8 km)	4:21.64	
2013	European Team Championships	(United Kingdom) Gateshead	10th	3000 m s'chase	10:09.19	
2013	Mediterranean Games	(Turkey) Mersin	6th	3000 m s'chase	10:01.23	PB

== National titles ==
- Italian Athletics Championships
  - Cross country running: 2013
