= Marco Boni =

Italian conductor

Marco Boni (born 30 October 1960) is an Italian conductor.

== Biography ==
He graduated from the Academy of Music in Milan and started his career as a cellist. In the 1980s, he performed as a cello major in the orchestra of the Comunale theatre in Bologna and was a founder of the group Virtuosi Italiani, where he played as a cello soloist.

In 1987 he continued his studies for becoming a conductor with Sergiu Celibidache.

After a concert tour in the main Italian cities, he was appointed Main Conductor of the Concertgebouw Chamber Orchestra of Amsterdam in 1994. Marco Boni, who is still holding the office, performed with the Dutch orchestra in France, Spain, Italy, India, Japan, Switzerland and Portugal. Marco Boni conducted also many major orchestras such as the Maggio Musicale Fiorentino, the Scottish Chamber Orchestra, the North Netherlands Symphony Orchestra and the Teatro Regio Orchestra of Parma.

He also has been conducting the Wiener Kammersymphonie since 2005.

He performed conducting the Concertgebouw Chamber Orchestra together with Misha Maisky in a concert tour throughout Spain.

Marco Boni registered Mahler’s arrangements of the quartets “Death and the Maiden” by Schubert and the quartet Op. 95 by Beethoven. Always with the Concertgebouw Chamber Orchestra, four recordings of works by Haydn, Mozart, Mendelssohn, Schubert and Tchaikovsky were released.

The latest recordings include a CD of Vivaldi and Bachfor the label Victor with the Filarmonici of the Bologna Teatro Comunale. And a double CD entirely dedicated to Giuseppe Verdi was released after the successful tour in India.

Recently he made two tours respectively in Italy and Spain with the orchestra Concertgebouw and Misha Maisky. A concert has taken place at the hall of Concertgebouw Amsterdam. This year, he participated in the joined work between Orchestra Regional Toscana and Swingle Singers.

In collaboration with the orchestra Wiener Kammerorchester, the concerts in Italy and Spain by Marco Boni resulted very successful.

In the summer of 2010, Marco Boni conducted a series of symphonic concerts with the Orchestra of Teatro Comunale, Bologna, which will continue in the winter season. With the same orchestra, the 10th symphony has been scheduled in the celebration of Mahler in 2011.

Since the autumn of 2010, the collaboration begins with Imola Piano Academy with the subject "Meeting with the Master ".
