= Valentina Costanza =

Italian middle-distance runner

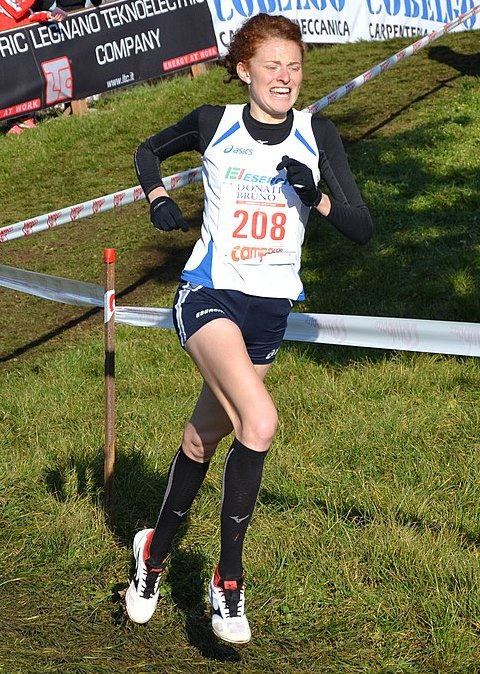

Personal information
- National team: Italy (6 caps)
- Born: 27 February 1987 (age 39) Niella, Italy
- Height: 1.72 m (5 ft 8 in)
- Weight: 56 kg (123 lb)

Sport
- Country: Italy
- Sport: Athletics
- Event(s): Middle-distance running 3000 metres steeplechase
- Club: C.S. Esercito; Pro Patria Milano

Achievements and titles
- Personal bests: 1500 m: 4:16.07 (2009); 3000 m: 9:16.11 (2010); 3000 m s'chase: 9:58.78 (2010); 3000 m indoor: 9:13.96 (2010)

Valentina Costanza (born 27 February 1987) is an Italian middle distance runner and 3000 metres steeplechaseer.

== Biography ==
Costanza won four national titles at senior level. In add of this in 2010, establishing her Personal Best with 9:13.96 in 3000 metres indoor, she had reached the 59th place in the seasonal world lists.

== Achievements ==
Year	Competition	Venue	Position	Event	Time	Notes
2010	European Team Championships (Super League)	(Norway) Bergen	6th	3000 m	9:16.59	
2011	European Team Championships (Super League)	(Sweden) Stockholm	9th	1500 m	4:25.35	
2011	Universiade	(China) Shenzhen	14th	3000 m steeplechase	10:05.34	

== National titles ==
- Italian Athletics Championships
  - 3000 m steeplechase: 2010, 2011, 2012
- Italian Athletics Indoor Championships
  - 3000 m: 2016
