= Italy at the 2017 World Championships in Athletics =

- WA code: ITA
- National federation: FIDAL
- Website: www.fidal.it

in London
- Competitors: 36 (18 men, 18 women)
- Medals Ranked =37th: Gold 0 Silver 0 Bronze 1 Total 1

World Championships in Athletics appearances (overview)
- 1976; 1980; 1983; 1987; 1991; 1993; 1995; 1997; 1999; 2001; 2003; 2005; 2007; 2009; 2011; 2013; 2015; 2017; 2019; 2022; 2023; 2025

Italy competed at the 2017 World Championships in Athletics in London, United Kingdom, from 4–13 August 2017.

== Medalists ==
Athlete	Gendre	Event	Medal
Antonella Palmisano	Women	20 Kilometres Race Walk	BRONZE

== Finalists ==
Italy national athletics team ranked 33rd (with only two finalists, the lowest score in 16 éditions) in the IAAF placing table. Rank obtained by assigning eight points in the first place and so on to the eight finalists.

Rank	Country	1st place, gold medalist(s)	2nd place, silver medalist(s)	3rd place, bronze medalist(s)	4	5	6	7	8	Pts
38	Italy	0	0	1	0	0	1	0	0	9

== Results ==
The Italian national athletics team at the 2017 World Championships in Athletics will consist of 36 athletes, 18 men and 18 women.

Finalists (first eight positions)

=== Men (18) ===
Event	Athlete	Club	Result	Performance	Notes
200 m	Filippo Tortu	G.S. Fiamme Gialle	17th Semi	20.62 DF; 20.59 QF	
400 m	Davide Re	G.S. Fiamme Gialle	23rd Semi	45.95 SF; 45.65 QF	
400 m hurdles	José Bencosme	G.S. Fiamme Gialle	16th Semi	50.29 SF; 49.79 QF	
400 m hurdles	Lorenzo Vergani	Pro Patria Milano	29th Quarter	50.37	
3000 m steeplechase	Abdoullah Bamoussa	Atletica Brugnera PN	26th Quarter	8:34.86	
3000 m steeplechase	Yohanes Chiappinelli	C.S. Carabinieri	30th Quarter	8:36.48	
3000 m steeplechase	Ala Zoghlami	ASD CUS Palermo	16th Quarter	8:26.18	PB
High jump	Gianmarco Tamberi	G.S. Fiamme Gialle	13th Qual.	2.29 m	SB
Long jump	Kevin Ojiaku	G.S. Fiamme Gialle	18th Qual.	7.82 m	
Hammer throw	Simone Falloni	C.S. Aeronautica Militare	30th Qual.	69.90 m	
Hammer throw	Marco Lingua	ASD Marco Lingua 4ever	10th	75.13 m F; 74.41 m Q	
Marathon	Stefano La Rosa	C.S. Carabinieri	rit.	no time	
Marathon	Daniele Meucci	C.S. Esercito	6th	2:10:56	PB
20 km walk	Giorgio Rubino	G.S. Fiamme Gialle	16th	1:20:47	SB
20 km walk	Francesco Fortunato	G.S. Fiamme Gialle	25th	1:22:01	PB
20 km walk	Matteo Giupponi	C.S. Carabinieri	48th	1:25:20	SB
50 km walk	Marco De Luca	G.S. Fiamme Gialle	9th	3:45:09	SB
50 km walk	Michele Antonelli	C.S. Aeronautica Militare	DNF	NM	

=== Women (18) ===
Event	Athlete	Club	Result	Performance	Notes
200 m	Gloria Hooper	C.S. Carabinieri	28th Quarter	23.51	
200 m	Irene Siragusa	C.S. Esercito	34th Quarter	23.73	
400 m	Maria Benedicta Chigbolu	C.S. Esercito	40th Quarter	53.00	
800 m	Yusneysi Santiusti	Assindustria Sport Padova	32nd Quarter	2:02.75	
1500 m	Margherita Magnani	G.S. Fiamme Gialle	25th Quarter	4:09.15	
400 m hurdles	Marzia Caravelli	C.S. Aeronautica Militare	29th Quarter	56.92	
400 m hurdles	Ayomide Folorunso	G.S. Fiamme Oro Padova	18th Semi	55.65 QF; 56.47 SF	SB
400 m hurdles	Yadisleidy Pedroso	C.S. Aeronautica Militare	13th Semi	56.41 QF; 55.95 SF	
3000 m steeplechase	Francesca Bertoni	A.S. La Fratellanza 1874	34th Semi	10:01.36	
High jump	Erika Furlani	G.S. Fiamme Oro Padova	28th Qual.	1.80 m	
High jump	Alessia Trost	G.S. Fiamme Gialle	19th Qual.	1.89 m	
Long jump	Laura Strati	Atletica Vicentina	24th Qual.	6.21 m	
20 km walk	Antonella Palmisano	G.S. Fiamme Gialle	3rd	1.26:36	PB
20 km walk	Eleonora Giorgi	G.S. Fiamme Azzurre		1:30:34	SB
20 km walk	Valentina Trapletti	C.S. Esercito	15th	1:30:36	PB
4 × 400 m relay	Maria Benedicta Chigbolu	C.S. Esercito|	9th Semi	3:27.81	SB
4 × 400 m relay	Maria Enrica Spacca	C.S. Carabinieri	9th Semi	3:27.81	SB
4 × 400 m relay	Libania Grenot	G.S. Fiamme Gialle	9th Semi	3:27.81	SB
4 × 400 m relay	Ayomide Folorunso	G.S. Fiamme Oro Padova	9th Semi	3:27.81	SB
