= Antonio La Torre (athletics coach) =

Italian athletics coach

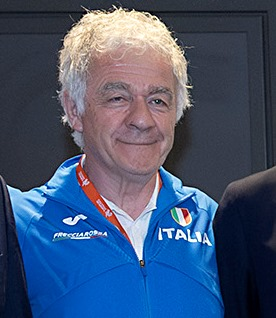

Personal information
- Nationality: Italian
- Born: 1 December 1956 (age 69) Manfredonia, Italy

Sport
- Sport: Athletics

Antonio La Torre (1 December 1956) is an Italian athletics coach, Technical Director of Italy national athletics team.

He was previously a coach specializing in race walking, coaching athletes Ivano Brugnetti and Raffaello Ducceschi from 1984 to 2004.

== Career ==
Having graduated in physical education (ISEF) in Italy in 1983 at the age of 27, he also earned a degree in physical and sports science and techniques in Dijon, France, in 1993.

In 2017, he joined the Italian Athletics Federation (FIDAL) and in December 2018, he was appointed coach of the Italy national athletics team.

== See also ==
Olympic Games

- Italy at the 2020 Summer Olympics - Athletics
- Italy at the 2024 Summer Olympics - Athletics

World Championships

- Italy at the 2019 World Athletics Championships
- Italy at the 2022 World Athletics Championships
- Italy at the 2023 World Athletics Championships
- Italy at the 2025 World Athletics Championships

World Indoor Championships

- Italy at the World Athletics Indoor Championships (2022, 2024, 2025, 2026)

European Championships

- Italy at the 2022 European Athletics Championships
- Italy at the 2024 European Athletics Championships

European Indoor Championships

- Italy at the 2019 European Athletics Indoor Championships
- Italy at the 2021 European Athletics Indoor Championships
- Italy at the 2023 European Athletics Indoor Championships
- Italy at the 2025 European Athletics Indoor Championships

World University Games

- Italy at the 2019 Summer Universiade
- Italy at the 2021 Summer World University Games
- Italy at the 2025 Summer World University Games
