= Italy at the World Athletics Championships =

- WA code: ITA
- National federation: FIDAL
- Website: www.fidal.it
- Medals Ranked 16th: Gold 13 Silver 18 Bronze 20 Total 51

World Athletics Championships appearances (overview)
- 1976; 1980; 1983; 1987; 1991; 1993; 1995; 1997; 1999; 2001; 2003; 2005; 2007; 2009; 2011; 2013; 2015; 2017; 2019; 2022; 2023; 2025

Italy has participated in all editions of the World Athletics Championships, held since the first edition of the 1983 World Athletics Championships, winning 51 podiums, including 13 world titles, 18 silver medals and 20 bronze medals.

Fiona May is the most successful Italian athlete in championships history, she won four medals: two gold, one silver and one bronze in the long jump.

== Medal count ==
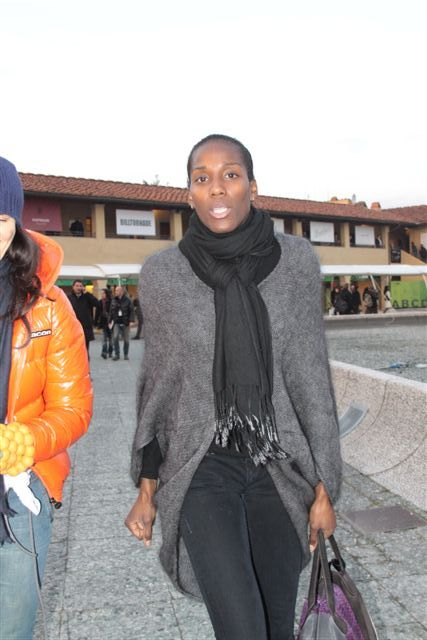
Fiona May, two gold medals at the WC

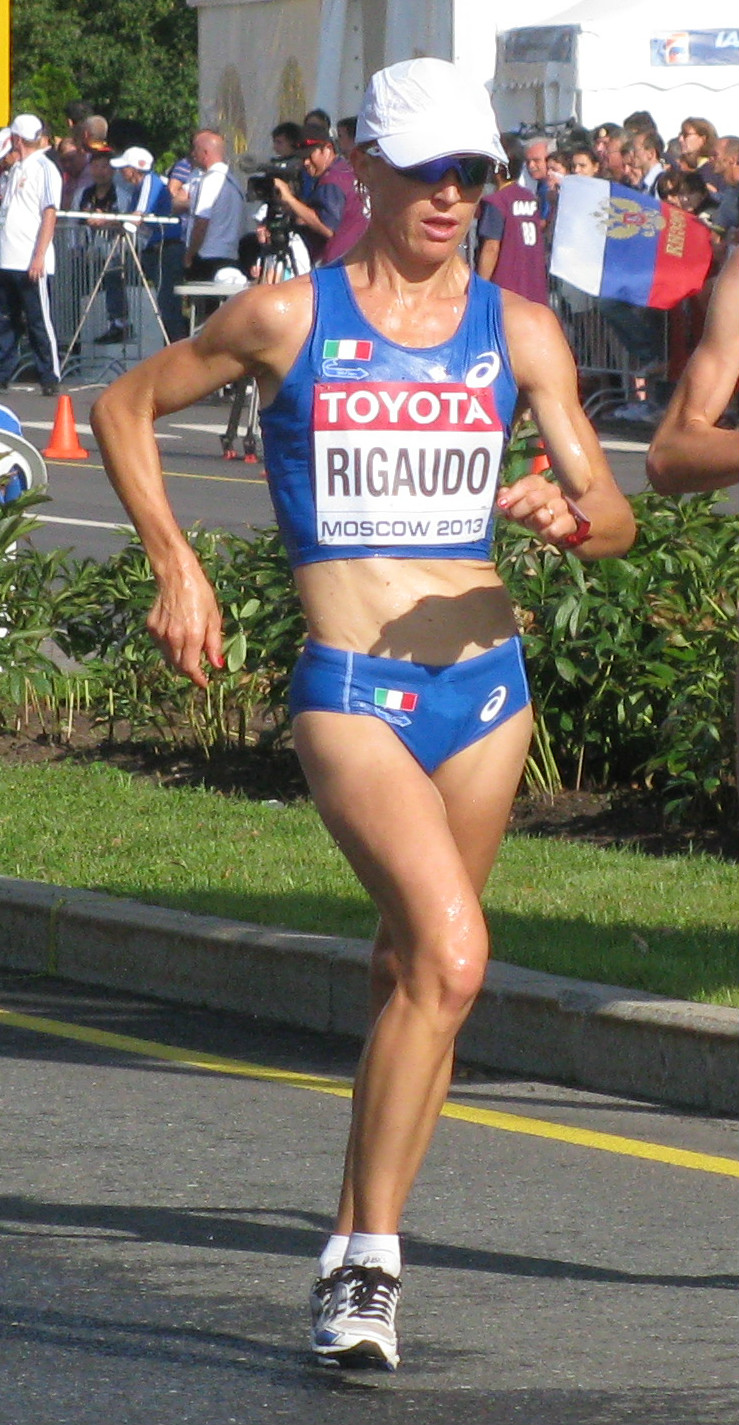
Elisa Rigaudo, 4th at the arrival af 20km racewalk at Daegu 2011 advanced to bronze, in 2016, and to silver, in 2019, for IAAF decision per Russian doping scandal.

Edition	Competitors			Men			Women			Total				
Edition	Tot.	Men	Women	1st place, gold medalist(s)	2nd place, silver medalist(s)	3rd place, bronze medalist(s)	1st place, gold medalist(s)	2nd place, silver medalist(s)	3rd place, bronze medalist(s)	1st place, gold medalist(s)	2nd place, silver medalist(s)	3rd place, bronze medalist(s)	Tot.	Rank
1983 Helsinki	39	27	12	1	1	1	0	0	0	1	1	1	3	8th
1987 Rome	56	35	21	2	2	1	0	0	0	2	2	1	5	6th
1991 Tokyo	48	33	15	1	0	0	0	0	0	1	0	0	1	12th
1993 Stuttgart	44	29	15	0	2	1	0	1	0	0	3	1	4	21st
1995 Göteborg	49	30	19	1	1	1	1	1	1	2	2	2	6	3rd=
1997 Athens	66	40	26	0	0	0	1	1	1	1	1	1	3	14th
1999 Sevilla	43	30	13	2	1	0	0	1	0	2	2	0	4	6th
2001 Edmonton	38	22	16	0	1	1	1	0	1	1	1	2	4	16th
2003 Paris	47	25	22	1	0	1	0	0	1	1	0	2	3	12th
2005 Helsinki	49	28	21	0	0	1	0	0	0	0	0	1	1	33rd
2007 Osaka	33	18	15	0	1	1	0	1	0	0	2	1	3	23rd
2009 Berlin	35	20	15	0	0	1	0	0	1	0	0	2	2	33rd
2011 Daegu	30	15	15	0	0	0	0	1	1	0	1	1	2	23rd
2013 Moscow	48	27	21	0	0	0	0	1	1	0	1	1	2	25th
2015 Beijing	31	14	17	0	0	0	0	0	0	0	0	0	0	-
2017 London	35	18	17	0	0	0	0	0	1	0	0	1	1	38th
2019 Doha	65	34	31	0	0	0	0	0	1	0	0	1	1	31st
2022 Eugene	60	29	31	1	0	0	0	0	1	1	0	1	2	19th
2023 Budapest	78	43	35	1	2	0	0	0	1	1	2	1	4	13th
2025 Tokyo	88	43	45	1	1	2	0	2	1	1	3	3	7	7th
Total				10	12	11	3	9	12	14	21	23	58	16th

=== Medals awarded years later after doping cases ===
Edition	Medal	Event	Athlete	Disqualified athlete (position)	Years for decision-making	Notes
(Germany) 2009 Berlin	3rd place, bronze medalist(s)	Men's 20 km walk	Giorgio Rubino	(Russia) Valeriy Borchin (1st)	7	
(Germany) 2009 Berlin	3rd place, bronze medalist(s)	Women's high jump	Antonietta Di Martino	(Russia) Anna Chicherova (2nd)	9	
(South Korea) 2011 Daegu	2nd place, silver medalist(s)	Women's 20 km walk	Elisa Rigaudo	(Russia) Olga Kaniskina (1st)	5	
(South Korea) 2011 Daegu	2nd place, silver medalist(s)	Women's 20 km walk	Elisa Rigaudo	(Russia) Anisya Kirdyapkina (2nd)	8	
(Russia) 2013 Moscow	3rd place, bronze medalist(s)	Women's 20 km walk	Elisa Rigaudo	(Russia) Elena Lashmanova (1st)	6	
(Russia) 2013 Moscow	3rd place, bronze medalist(s)	Women's 20 km walk	Elisa Rigaudo	(Russia) Anisya Kirdyapkina (2nd)	9	

== Medalists ==
=== By athletes ===
Athlete	Gender	Gold	Silver	Bronze	Total	Editions
Fiona May	W	2	1	1	4	1995–2001
Maurizio Damilano	M	2	0	0	2	1987–1991
Francesco Panetta	M	1	1	0	2	1987
Fabrizio Mori	M	1	1	0	2	1999–2001
Alberto Cova	M	1	0	0	1	1983
Michele Didoni	M	1	0	0	1	1995
Annarita Sidoti	W	1	0	0	1	1997
Ivano Brugnetti	M	1	0	0	1	1999
Giuseppe Gibilisco	M	1	0	0	1	2003
Massimo Stano	M	1	0	0	1	2022
Gianmarco Tamberi	M	1	0	0	1	2023
Antonietta Di Martino	W	0	1	2	3	2007–2011
Pietro Mennea *	M	0	1	1	2	1983
Elisabetta Perrone	W	0	1	1	2	1995–2001
Elisa Rigaudo	W	0	1	1	2	2011-2013
Pierfrancesco Pavoni *	M	0	1	0	1	1983
Carlo Simionato *	M	0	1	0	1	1983
Stefano Tilli *	M	0	1	0	1	1983
Alessandro Andrei	M	0	1	0	1	1987
Giuseppe D'Urso	M	0	1	0	1	1993
Giovanni De Benedictis	M	0	1	0	1	1993
Ileana Salvador	W	0	1	0	1	1993
Giovanni Perricelli	M	0	1	0	1	1995
Roberta Brunet	W	0	1	0	1	1997
Vincenzo Modica	M	0	1	0	1	1999
Andrew Howe	M	0	1	0	1	2007
Valeria Straneo	W	0	1	0	1	2013
Leonardo Fabbri	M	0	1	0	1	2023
Roberto Rigali *	M	0	1	0	1	2023
Marcell Jacobs *	M	0	1	0	1	2023
Lorenzo Patta *	M	0	1	0	1	2023
Filippo Tortu *	M	0	1	0	1	2023
Stefano Baldini	M	0	0	2	2	2001–2003
Alex Schwazer	M	0	0	2	2	2005–2007
Antonella Palmisano	W	0	0	2	2	2017-2023
Gelindo Bordin	M	0	0	1	1	1987
Alessandro Lambruschini	M	0	0	1	1	1993
Angelo Cipolloni *	M	0	0	1	1	1995
Sandro Floris *	M	0	0	1	1	1995
Ezio Madonia *	M	0	0	1	1	1995
Giovanni Puggioni *	M	0	0	1	1	1995
Ornella Ferrara	W	0	0	1	1	1995
Magdelín Martínez	W	0	0	1	1	2003
Giorgio Rubino	M	0	0	1	1	2009
Eleonora Giorgi	W	0	0	1	1	2019
Elena Vallortigara	W	0	0	1	1	2022
Total		13	24	23	60	
* He won a medal with relay team

=== By events ===
Event	Gold	Silver	Bronze	Total
Racewalking	6	5	8	19
Jumping	4	3	5	12
Hurdling	1	1	0	2
Long-distance running	1	1	0	2
Steeplechase	1	0	1	2
Marathon	0	2	4	6
Relay	0	2	1	3
Middle-distance running	0	2	0	2
Throwing	0	2	0	2
Sprinting	0	0	1	1
Totals (10 entries)	13	18	20	51

== Placing table ==
In the IAAF placing table the score is obtained by assigning eight points in the first place and so on to the eight finalists.

Edition	1st place, gold medalist(s)	2nd place, silver medalist(s)	3rd place, bronze medalist(s)	4	5	6	7	8	Pts	Rank	Finalists	Medals
Helsinki 1983	1	1	1	0	1	2	6	0	43	8	12	3
Rome 1987	2	2	1	2	1	1	4	0	61	6	13	5
Tokyo 1991	1	0	0	1	1	3	5	3	39	10	14	1
Stuttgart 1993	0	3	1	1	0	3	0	2	43	11	10	4
Göteborg 1995	2	2	2	1	2	1	2	1	63	6	13	6
Athens 1997	1	1	1	2	2	0	4	5	52	9	16	3
Seville 1999	2	2	0	0	3	3	1	2	55	9	13	4
Edmonton 2001	1	1	2	3	0	0	0	2	44	12	9	4
Paris 2003	1	0	2	0	1	4	1	1	39	13	10	3
Helsinki 2005	0	0	1	0	3	0	1	2	22	22	7	1
Osaka 2007	0	2	1	0	2	0	1	1	31	16	7	3
Berlin 2009	0	0	1	1	0	2	3	2	25	17	9	1
Daegu 2011	0	0	2	0	1	0	2	2	22	17	7	2
Moscow 2013	0	1	1	0	0	2	1	2	23	19	7	2
Beijing 2015	0	0	0	1	1	0	0	2	11	29	4	0
London 2017	0	0	1	0	0	1	0	0	9	38	2	1
Doha 2019	0	0	1	0	0	1	2	3	16	26	7	1
Eugene 2022	1	0	1	3	1	0	2	2	39	12	10	2
Budapest 2023	1	2	1	1	1	2	3	2	51	8	13	4

== Doping disqualifications ==
Athlete	Sex	Event	Year(s)	Result	Notes
Roberto Barbi	Men	Marathon	2001	60th	

== See also ==
- Athletics in Italy
- Italy national athletics team
- Italy at the European Athletics Championships
- Italy at the World Indoor Championships in Athletics
