= Italy at the 2015 World Championships in Athletics =

- WA code: ITA
- National federation: FIDAL
- Website: www.fidal.it

in Beijing
- Competitors: 31 (14 men, 17 women)
- Medals: Gold 0 Silver 0 Bronze 0 Total 0

World Championships in Athletics appearances (overview)
- 1976; 1980; 1983; 1987; 1991; 1993; 1995; 1997; 1999; 2001; 2003; 2005; 2007; 2009; 2011; 2013; 2015; 2017; 2019; 2022; 2023; 2025

Italy competed at the 2015 World Championships in Athletics in Beijing, China, from 22 to 30 August 2015.

== Finalists ==
Italy national athletics team ranked 29th (with only four finalists) in the IAAF placing table. Rank obtained by assigning eight points in the first place and so on to the eight finalists.

Rank	Country	1st place, gold medalist(s)	2nd place, silver medalist(s)	3rd place, bronze medalist(s)	4	5	6	7	8	Pts
29	Italy	0	0	0	1	1	0	0	2	11

== Results ==
(q – qualified, NM – no mark, SB – season best)

Finalists (first eight positions)

=== Men ===
Track and road events

Athlete	Event	Heat		Semifinal		Final	
Athlete	Event	Result	Rank	Result	Rank	Result	Rank
Jacques Riparelli	100 metres	10.41	40	did not advance			
Giordano Benedetti	800 metres	1:48.15	27	did not advance			
Jamel Chatbi	3000 metres steeplechase	8:47.30	23	did not advance			
Daniele Meucci	Marathon	—N/a				2:14:53	8
Ruggero Pertile	Marathon	—N/a				2:14:22 SB	4
Giorgio Rubino	20 kilometres walk	—N/a				1:23:23	20
Federico Tontodonati	20 kilometres walk	—N/a				1:24:33	27
Massimo Stano	20 kilometres walk	—N/a				1:22:53	19
Teodorico Caporaso	50 kilometres walk	—N/a				3:56:58	25
Marco De Luca	50 kilometres walk	—N/a				3:53:02	16
Matteo Giupponi	50 kilometres walk	—N/a				3:53:23	17

Field events

Athlete	Event	Qualification		Final	
Athlete	Event	Distance	Position	Distance	Position
Marco Fassinotti	High jump	DNS		did not advance	
Gianmarco Tamberi	High jump	2.29	=10 q	2.25	8
Marco Lingua	Hammer throw	72.85	19	did not advance	

=== Women ===
Track and road events

Athlete	Event	Heat		Semifinal		Final	
Athlete	Event	Result	Rank	Result	Rank	Result	Rank
Gloria Hooper	200 metres	22.99 SB	17 Q	22.92 PB	16	did not advance	
Maria Benedicta Chigbolu	400 metres	52.48	35	did not advance			
Libania Grenot	400 metres	51.64	22 q	51.14	14	did not advance	
Margherita Magnani	1500 metres	4:09.06	19	did not advance			
Yadisleidy Pedroso	400 metres hurdles	1:25.15	36	did not advance			
Anna Bongiorni; Gloria Hooper; Giulia Riva; Irene Siragusa	4 × 100 metres relay	43.22 SB	12	—N/a		did not advance	
Chiara Bazzoni; Elena Maria Bonfanti; Maria Benedicta Chigbolu; Ayomide Folorunso	4 × 400 metres relay	3:27.07 SB	9	—N/a		did not advance	
Eleonora Giorgi	20 kilometres walk	—N/a				DQ	
Antonella Palmisano	20 kilometres walk	—N/a				1:29:34	5
Elisa Rigaudo	20 kilometres walk	—N/a				DQ	

Field events

Athlete	Event	Qualification		Final	
Athlete	Event	Distance	Position	Distance	Position
Simona La Mantia	Triple jump	13.77	14	did not advance	
Chiara Rosa	Shot put	17.54	14	did not advance	
Silvia Salis	Hammer throw	66.80	24	did not advance	
