= Italy at the 2003 World Championships in Athletics =

- WA code: ITA
- National federation: FIDAL
- Website: www.fidal.it

in Paris
- Competitors: 47 (25 men, 22 women)
- Medals Ranked 12th: Gold 1 Silver 0 Bronze 2 Total 3

World Championships in Athletics appearances (overview)
- 1976; 1980; 1983; 1987; 1991; 1993; 1995; 1997; 1999; 2001; 2003; 2005; 2007; 2009; 2011; 2013; 2015; 2017; 2019; 2022; 2023; 2025

Italy competed at the 2003 World Championships in Athletics in Paris, France from 23 to 31 August 2003.

== Medalists ==
Athlete	Gendre	Event	Medal
Giuseppe Gibilisco	Men	Pole vault	Gold
Stefano Baldini	Men	Marathon	Bronze
Magdelín Martínez	Women	Triple jump	Bronze
Medal not included in the medal table
Italy national athletics team	Men	Marathon	Silver

== Finalists ==
The team ranked 13th (with 10 finalists) in the IAAF placing table. Rank obtained by assigning eight points in the first place and so on to the eight finalists (four men and five women).

Rank	Country	1st place, gold medalist(s)	2nd place, silver medalist(s)	3rd place, bronze medalist(s)	4	5	6	7	8	Pts
13	Italy	1	0	2	0	1	4	1	1	39

== Results ==
Italy participated with 47 athletes by winning three medals and placing nine finalists.

Finalists (first eight positions)

=== Men (25) ===
Track and road events
Event	Athlete	Result	Performances	Notes
200 m	Alessandro Cavallaro	Semi	20.59 (7th SF2), 20.47 (2nd QF2), 20.42 (2nd H4)	
400 m	Andrea Barberi	Heat	45.87 (5th 4H)	
800 m	Andrea Longo	5th	1:45.43; 1:46.26 (1st SF3), 1:46.26 (1st H7)	
1500 m	Christian Obrist	Semi	3:41.88 (9th SF1), 3:43.01 (5th H2)	
110 m hs	Andrea Giaconi	Semi	13.84 (7th SF2), 13.69 (6th H1)	
3000 m st	Angelo Iannelli	Heat	8:36.08 (11th H2)	
Marathon	Stefano Baldini	3rd	2:09:14	
Marathon	Daniele Caimmi	6th	2:09:29	SB
Marathon	Alberico Di Cecco	22nd	2:13:36	
Marathon	Ruggero Pertile	23rd	2:13:45	
20 km walk	Lorenzo Civallero	11th	1:20:34	PB
20 km walk	Michele Didoni	16th	1:21:23	SB
20 km walk	Alessandro Gandellini	21st	1:24:45	
50 km walk	Marco Giungi	DQ	NM	
4 × 100 m relay	(Italy) National Team; Francesco Scuderi; Simone Collio; Massimiliano Donati; Alessandro Cavallaro	Semi	38.93 (8th in SF1), 38.63 (1st in H4)	

Field events
Event	Athlete	Result	Performances	Notes
High jump	Andrea Bettinelli	Qual.	2.25 m (9th group A)	
High jump	Alessandro Talotti	Qual.	2.25 m (11th group B)	
High jump	Nicola Ciotti	Qual.	2.20 m (15th group B)	
Pole vault	Giuseppe Gibilisco	1st	5.90 m	NR
Long jump	Nicola Trentin	Qual.	4.85 m (6th in group B)	
Triple jump	Fabrizio Donato	Qual.	16.63 m (6th in group B)	
Discus throw	Diego Fortuna	Qual.	61.46 m (7th group B)	
Hammer throw	Nicola Vizzoni	Qual.	79.76 m (9th in group A)	

=== Women (22) ===
Track and road events
Event	Athlete	Result	Performances	Notes
400 m hs	Monica Niederstatter	Heat	56.62 (6th H1)	
Marathon	Lucilla Andreucci	41st	2:38:22	
Marathon	Gloria Marconi	42nd	2:38:26	
Marathon	Giovanna Volpato	43rd	2:38:38	
Marathon	Simona Viola	58th	2:54:27	
Marathon	Rosaria Console	DNF	NM	
20 km walk	Rossella Giordano	6th	1:29:14	
20 km walk	Elisa Rigaudo	10th	1:30:34	
20 km walk	Elisabetta Perrone	DNF	NM	
4 × 400 m relay	(Italy) National Team; Danielle Perpoli; Monica Niederstatter; Maria Teresa Schutzmann; Virna De Angeli	Heat	3.32.00 (5th in H2)	

Field events
Event	Athlete	Result	Performances	Notes
High jump	Antonella Bevilacqua	Qual.	1.85 m (9th in group B)	
Long jump	Fiona May	9th	6.46 m, Qual. 6.57 m (4th in group B)	
Triple jump	Magdelín Martínez	3rd	14.90 m; Qual. 14.73 m (1st in group A)	NR
Triple jump	Barbara Lah	Qual.	14.38 m (5th in group B)	
Triple jump	Simona La Mantia	Qual.	14.05 m (9th in group B)	
Shot put	Assunta Legnante	8th	18.28 m, Qual. 17.97 m (6th group B)	
Hammer throw	Ester Balassini	Qual.	64.67 m (10th group B)	
Hammer throw	Clarissa Claretti	Qual.	62.19 m (11th group A)	
Javelin throw	Claudia Coslovich	7th	59.64 m, Qual. 59.57 m (4th group B)	
Heptathlon	Gertrud Bacher	6th	6166 pts	
