= Italy at the 1993 World Championships in Athletics =

- WA code: ITA
- National federation: FIDAL
- Website: www.fidal.it

in Stuttgart
- Competitors: 44 (29 men, 15 women)
- Medals Ranked 21st: Gold 0 Silver 3 Bronze 1 Total 4

World Championships in Athletics appearances (overview)
- 1976; 1980; 1983; 1987; 1991; 1993; 1995; 1997; 1999; 2001; 2003; 2005; 2007; 2009; 2011; 2013; 2015; 2017; 2019; 2022; 2023; 2025

Italy competed at the 1993 World Championships in Athletics in Stuttgart, Germany from 13 to 22 August 1993.

== Finalists ==
Italy national athletics team ranked 11th (with 10 finalists) in the IAAF placing table. Rank obtained by assigning eight points in the first place and so on to the eight finalists.

Rank	Country	1st place, gold medalist(s)	2nd place, silver medalist(s)	3rd place, bronze medalist(s)	4	5	6	7	8	Pts
11	Italy	0	3	1	1	0	3	0	2	43

== Results ==
Italy participated with 44 athletes by winning four medals.

Finalists (first eight positions)

=== Men (29) ===
Track and field events
Event	Athlete	Result	Performances	Notes
200 m	Giorgio Marras	Quarter	6th in 3rd QF with 20.87, 4th in 7th heat with 20.95	
400 m	Andrea Nuti	Quarter	8th in 3rd QF with 46.77, 4th in 2nd heat with 46.59	
800 m	Giuseppe D'Urso	2nd	with 1:44.86; 1st in 2nd SF with 1:44.83, 1st in 5th heat with 1:48.79	
800 m	Andrea Benvenuti	Heat	ret. in 4th heat	
1500 m	Gennaro Di Napoli	12th	with 3:47.38; 3rd in 2nd SF with 3:41.06, 2nd in 1st heat with 3:39.41	
10,000 m	Francesco Panetta	6th	with 28:27.05; 7th in 1st heat with 28:20.49	
10,000 m	Salvatore Antibo	12th	with 29:10.83, 1st in 2nd heat with 28:27.48	
Marathon	Salvatore Bettiol	Ret.		
3000 m st	Alessandro Lambruschini	3rd	with 8:08.78 4th in 2nd heat with 8:25.46	
3000 m st	Angelo Carosi	8th	with 8:23.42: 3rd in 3rd heat with 8:19.66	
110 m hs	Fausto Frigerio	Heat	5th in 1st heat with 13.97	
400 m hs	Giorgio Frinolli	Semi	3rd in 3rd SF with 49.22, 3rd in 4th heat with 49.42	
400 m hs	Fabrizio Mori	Semi	3rd in 2nd SF with 49.23, 3rd in 5th heat with 50.10	
High jump	Roberto Ferrari	Qual..	with 2.25	
Pole vault	Andrea Pegoraro	Qual..	with 5.65	
Shot put	Paolo Dal Soglio	Qual..	with 18.68	
Hammer throw	Enrico Sgrulletti	Qual..	with 64.58	
Javelin throw	Fabio De Gaspari	Qual..	with 74.34	
20 km walk	Giovanni De Benedictis	2nd	with 1h23:06	
20 km walk	Arturo Di Mezza	13th	with 1h24:5	
20 km walk	Walter Arena	DQ	NM	
50 km walk	Giovanni Perricelli	13th	with 3h54:30	
50 km walk	Massimo Quiriconi	15th	with 3h57:33	
4x100 m relay	(Italy) National Team; Giorgio Marras; Carlo Occhiena; Andrea Amici; Ezio Madonia	Semi	disq. in 2nd SF, 3. in 4th heatwith 39.37	
4x400 m relay	(Italy) National Team; Andrea Nuti; Andrea Montanari; Alessandro Aimar; Marco Vaccari	Heat	4th in 3rd heat with 3:01.85	

=== Women (15) ===
Track and field events
Event	Athlete	Result	Performances	Notes
800 m	Fabia Trabaldo	Heat	4th in 4th heat with 2:02.36	
1500 m	Fabia Trabaldo	8th	with 4:08.23; 3rd in 3rd heat with 4:07.95	
3000 m	Roberta Brunet	Heat	7. in 1st heat with 8:57.46	
3000 m	Valentina Tauceri	Heat	8th in 2nd heat with 9:00.20	
10,000 m	Maria Guida	12th	with 32:15.32; 3rd in 2nd heat with 32:26.60	
Marathon	Bettina Sabatini	Ret.	NM	
Marathon	Rosanna Munerotto	Ret.	NM	
100 m hs	Carla Tuzzi	Heat	6th in 6th heat with 13.54	
High jump	Antonella Bevilacqua	6th	with 1.94 m (1.93 m in qual.)	
Long jump	Valentina Uccheddu	12th	with m 6.38 (6.48 m in qual.)	
Long jump	Antonella Capriotti	Qual.	with 6.23 m	
Triple jump	Antonella Capriotti	6th	with 14.18 m (13.52 m in qual.)	
Shot put	Agnese Maffeis	Qual.	with 16.61 m	
Discus throw	Agnese Maffeis	Qual.	with 57.06 m	
Heptathlon	Giuliana Spada	22nd	with 5.214 pts	
10 km walk	Ileana Salvador	2nd	with 43:08	
10 km walk	Elisabetta Perrone	4th	with 43:26	
10 km walk	Annarita Sidoti	9th	with 44:13	
