= Italy at the 2019 World Athletics Championships =

Italy at the 2019 World Championships in Athletics
- WA code: ITA
- National federation: FIDAL
- Website: www.fidal.it

in (Qatar) Doha
- Competitors: 65 (33 men, 32 women)
- Medals Ranked = 31st: Gold 0 Silver 0 Bronze 1 Total 1

World Championships in Athletics appearances (overview)
- 1976; 1980; 1983; 1987; 1991; 1993; 1995; 1997; 1999; 2001; 2003; 2005; 2007; 2009; 2011; 2013; 2015; 2017; 2019; 2022; 2023; 2025

Italy competed at the 2019 World Athletics Championships in Doha, Qatar, from 27 September to 6 October 2019 .

== Medalists ==
Medal	Name	Event	Date
Bronze	Eleonora Giorgi	50 km walk	28 September

== Placing table ==
Italy team finished 26th position in placing table.

Rank	Country	1st place, gold medalist(s)	2nd place, silver medalist(s)	3rd place, bronze medalist(s)	4	5	6	7	8	Pts
26	Italy	0	0	1	0	0	1	2	3	16

== Team ==
On 12 September 2019, the technical commissioner of the Italian national team Antonio La Torre issued the list of the athletes called up for the Doha World Championships, 65 athletes (34 men and 31 women), including members of all five relays (the only country to have managed to qualify them all in addition to Jamaica), and 7 athletes selected based on the target numbers established by the IAAF. With a total of 66 final entries (one woman athlete is added on 21 September), this is the biggest Italian team ever at the World Championships (same number as in 1997, 66).

=== Men (33) ===
Initially 34, the selected were reduced to 33 because Giorgio Rubino (G.A. Fiamme Gialle), selected for Race walk 20 km has given forfait.

Eliminated at first round
Finalists (or top eight)

Italic: did not participate

Event	Athlete	day 1	day 2	day 3	day 4	day 5	day 6	day7	day 8	day 9	day 10	Notes
100 m	Filippo Tortu	10.20 (SF)	10.11 (F)									
4 × 100 m	Filippo Tortu								38.11 (10th)			NR
100 m	Marcell Jacobs	10.07 (SF)	10.20 (19th)									
4 × 100 m	Marcell Jacobs								38.11 (10th)			NR
200 m	Faustino Desalu			20.43 (SF)	20.73 (21st)							
4 × 100 m	Faustino Desalu											
200 m	Antonio Infantino			20.89 (41st)								(Note: selected based on target numbers.)
4 × 100 m	Antonio Infantino											
400 m	Davide Re					45.08 (SF)	44.85 (9th)					
4 × 400 m	Davide Re									3:01.60 (F)	3:02.78 (6th)	SB
4 × 400 m mixed	Davide Re											
5000 m	Yemaneberhan Crippa	13:29.08 (21st)										
10,000 m	Yemaneberhan Crippa										27:10.76 (8th)	NR
5000 m	Said El Otmani	DNF										
110 m hs	Hassane Fofana				13.49 (SF)		13.52 (12th)					
110 m hs	Lorenzo Perini				13.70 (23rd)							
3000 m st	Yohanes Chiappinelli					8:24.73 (19th)						
3000 m st	Osama Zoghlami					8:28.57 (27th)						
High jump	Stefano Sottile					2.26 m (16th)						
High jump	Gianmarco Tamberi					2.29 m (F)			2.27 m (8th)			
Pole vault	Claudio Stecchi		5.75 m (F)			5.70 m (8th)						
Triple jump	Andrea Dallavalle	15.09 m (32nd)										
Shot put	Leonardo Fabbri							20.75 m (13th)				
Discus throw	Giovanni Faloci		59.77 m (30th)									
Marathon	Eyob Faniel									2:13:57 (15th)		SB
Marathon	Daniele Meucci									Ret. (DNF)		
Marathon	Yassine Rachik									2:12:41 (12th)		
Race walk 20 km	Matteo Giupponi								1:34:29 (25th)			
Race walk 20 km	Massimo Stano								1:31:36 (14th)			
Race walk 50 km	Michele Antonelli		4:22:20 (16th)									
Race walk 50 km	Teodorico Caporaso		DNF									
4 × 100 m	Federico Cattaneo								38.11 (10th)			NR
4 × 100 m	Davide Manenti								38.11 (10th)			NR
4 × 100 m	Roberto Rigali											
4 × 400 m	Vladimir Aceti									3:01.60 (F)	3:02.78 (6th)	SB
4 × 400 m mixed	Vladimir Aceti											
4 × 400 m	Daniele Corsa											
4 × 400 m mixed	Daniele Corsa											
4 × 400 m	Matteo Galvan									3:01.60 (F)	3:02.78 (6th)	SB
4 × 400 m mixed	Matteo Galvan											
4 × 400 m	Michele Tricca											
4 × 400 m mixed	Michele Tricca											
4 × 400 m	Brayan Lopez											
4 × 400 m mixed	Brayan Lopez		3:16.52 (9th)									
4 × 400 m	Edoardo Scotti									3:01.60 (F)	3:02.78 (6th)	SB
4 × 400 m mixed	Edoardo Scotti		3:16.52 (9th)									

=== Women (32) ===
Eliminated at first round

Event	Athlete	day 1	day 2	day 3	day 4	day 5	day 6	day7	day 8	day 9	day 10	Notes
200 m	Gloria Hooper				23.33 (32nd)							
4 × 100 m	Gloria Hooper								42.90 (SF)	42.98 (7th)		NR
400 m	Benedicta Chigbolu				52.63 (38th)							
4 × 400 m/mixed	Benedicta Chigbolu									3:27.40 (9th)		SB
800 m	Eleonora Vandi	2:04.98 (38th)										
100 m hs	Luminosa Bogliolo									12.80 (SF)	13.06 (18th)	
400 m hs	Ayomide Folorunso					55.20 (SF)	55.36 (13th)					
4 × 400 m/mixed	Ayomide Folorunso									3:27.40 (9th)		SB
400 m hs	Linda Olivieri					56.82 (28th)						
400 m hs	Yadisleidy Pedroso					55.78 (SF)	55.40 (15th)					SB
High jump	Alessia Trost	1.92 m (14th)										
High jump	Elena Vallortigara	1.89 m (17th)										
Pole vault	Roberta Bruni	5.35 m (29th)										
Long jump	Tania Vicenzino									6.23 m (28th)		
Long jump	Laura Strati									6.05 m (31st)		
Triple jump	Ottavia Cestonaro							13.97 m (17th)				
Discus throw	Daisy Osakue						57.55 m (20th)					
Hammer throw	Sara Fantini	66.58 m (26th)										
Marathon	Sara Dossena	DNF										
Marathon	Giovanna Epis	DNF										
Race walk 20 km	Antonella Palmisano			1:37:36 (13th)								SB
Race walk 20 km	Valentina Trapletti			1:38:22 (17th)								
Race walk 50 km	Mariavittoria Becchetti		DNF									
Race walk 50 km	Nicole Colombi		DNF									
Race walk 50 km	Eleonora Giorgi		4:29:13 (3rd)									
4 × 100 m	Anna Bongiorni								42.90 (SF)	42.98 (7th)		NR
4 × 100 m	Zaynab Dosso											
4 × 100 m	Johanelis Herrera								42.90 (SF)	42.98 (7th)		NR
4 × 100 m	Alessia Pavese											
4 × 100 m	Irene Siragusa								42.90 (SF)	42.98 (7th)		NR
4 × 400 m	Rebecca Borga											
4 × 400 m mixed	Rebecca Borga											
4 × 400 m	Alice Mangione											
4 × 400 m mixed	Alice Mangione											
4 × 400 m	Marta Milani											
4 × 400 m mixed	Marta Milani											
4 × 400 m	Raphaela Lukudo									3:27.40 (9th)		SB
4 × 400 m mixed	Raphaela Lukudo		3:16.52 (9th)									
4 × 400 m	Giancarla Trevisan									3:27.40 (9th)		SB
4 × 400 m mixed	Giancarla Trevisan		3:16.52 (9th)									
