= Italy at the 2001 World Championships in Athletics =

- WA code: ITA
- National federation: FIDAL
- Website: www.fidal.it

in Edmonton
- Competitors: 38 (22 men, 16 women)
- Medals Ranked 16th: Gold 1 Silver 1 Bronze 2 Total 4

World Championships in Athletics appearances (overview)
- 1976; 1980; 1983; 1987; 1991; 1993; 1995; 1997; 1999; 2001; 2003; 2005; 2007; 2009; 2011; 2013; 2015; 2017; 2019; 2022; 2023; 2025

Italy competed at the 2001 World Championships in Athletics in Edmonton, Canada from 3 to 12 August 2001.

== Medalists ==
| Athlete | Gendre | Event | Medal |
|---|---|---|---|
| Fiona May | Women | Long jump | Gold |
| Fabrizio Mori | Men | 400 Metres Hurdles | Silver |
| Stefano Baldini | Men | Marathon | Bronze |
| Elisabetta Perrone | Women | 20 Kilometres Race Walk | Bronze |
Medal not included in the medal table
| Italy national athletics team | Men | Marathon | Bronze |

== Finalists ==
The team ranked 12th (with 9 finalists) in the IAAF placing table. Rank obtained by assigning eight points in the first place and so on to the eight finalists.

| Rank | Country | 1st place, gold medalist(s) | 2nd place, silver medalist(s) | 3rd place, bronze medalist(s) | 4 | 5 | 6 | 7 | 8 | Pts |
|---|---|---|---|---|---|---|---|---|---|---|
| 12 | Italy | 1 | 1 | 2 | 3 | 0 | 0 | 0 | 2 | 44 |

== Results ==
Italy participated with 38 athletes by winning four medals.

Finalists (first eight positions)

=== Men (22) ===
Track and field events
| Event | Athlete | Result | Performances | Notes |
| 100 m | Francesco Scuderi | Haat | (5. in 5b with 10.53) | |
| 200 m | Marco Torrieri | Semi | (5. in 2sf with 20.38, 2. nel 2qf with 20.43, 1. in 2b with 20.63) | |
| 400 m | Alessandro Attene | Haat | (6. in 2b with 46.56) | |
| 10,000 m | Marco Mazza | 14th | with 28:08.00 | |
| Marathon | Stefano Baldini | 3rd | with 2h13:18; | |
| Marathon | Giacomo Leone | 11th | with 2h17:54 | |
| Marathon | Giovanni Ruggiero | 17th | 2h20:44 | |
| Marathon | Alberico Di Cecco | Ret. | NM | |
| Marathon | Roberto Barbi | DQ | (60. al traguardo with 2h35:55) | |
| 400 m hs | Fabrizio Mori | 2nd | 2. with 47.54 (1. in 1sf with 48.49, 1. in 1b with 49.29) | |
| Pole vault | Giuseppe Gibilisco | Qual. | NM | |
| Triple jump | Paolo Camossi | 11th | with 16.18 (in qualification: 4. in group A with 16.89) | |
| Shot put | Paolo Dal Soglio | Qual. | (8. in group B with 19.80) | |
| Hammer throw | Nicola Vizzoni | 4th | with 80.13 (in qualificazione: 5. in group B with 78.66) | |
| Hammer throw | Loris Paoluzzi | Qual. | (10. in group A with 74.75) | |
| 20 km walk | Alessandro Gandellini | 12th | with 1h24:05 | |
| 20 km walk | Lorenzo Civallero | 16th | with 1h25:28 | |
| 50 km walk | Marco Giungi | 8th | with 3h51:09 | |
| 50 km walk | Francesco Galdenzi | 13th | with 3h54:42 | |
| 50 km walk | Giovanni De Benedictis | DNF | NM | |
| 4 × 100 m relay | (Italy) National Team; Francesco Scuderi; Marco Torrieri; Maurizio Checcucci; Andrea Colombo | Semi | (5. in 1sf with 38.71,3. in 3b with 38.97) | |

=== Women (16) ===
Track and field events
| Event | Athlete | Result | Performances | Notes |
| 100 m | Manuela Levorato | Haat | (8. in 1sf with 11.50, 4. nel 1qf with 11.29, 2. in 4b with 11.46) | |
| 200 m | Manuela Levorato | Haat | (6. in 1sf with 23.13; 5. in 5b with 23.23) | |
| Marathon | Ornella Ferrara | 14th | with 2h32:45 | |
| Marathon | Bruna Genovese | 17th | with 2h33:13 | |
| Marathon | Rosaria Console | 20th | with 2h34:11 | |
| Marathon | Tiziana Alagia | 21st | with 2h34:45 | |
| Marathon | Sara Ferrari | 26th | with 2h36:07 | |
| 400 m hs | Monica Niederstatter | Haat | (7. in 1sf with 56.37, 3. in 3b with 55.83) | |
| High jump | Antonietta Di Martino | 12th | with 1.85 (in qualification: 1. in group B with 1.91) | |
| Long jump | Fiona May | 1st | 7.02w (in qualification: 1. in group A with 6.80) | |
| Triple jump | Magdelín Martínez | 4th | with 14.52 (in qualification: 1. nel group B with 14.59) | |
| Hammer throw | Ester Balassini | Qual. | NM in group A | |
| Javelin throw | Claudia Coslovich | 11th | with 57.27 (in qualification: 7. nel group B com 58.42) | |
| Heptathlon | Gertrud Bacher | 9th | with 6.010 pts | |
| 20 km walk | Elisabetta Perrone | 3rd | with 1h28:56 | |
| 20 km walk | Erica Alfridi | 4th | with 1h29:48 | |
| 20 km walk | Annarita Sidoti | 6th | with 1h31:40 | |
