= Italy at the 1991 World Championships in Athletics =

- WA code: ITA
- National federation: FIDAL
- Website: www.fidal.it

in Tokyo
- Competitors: 48 (33 men, 15 women)
- Medals Ranked 12th: Gold 1 Silver 0 Bronze 0 Total 1

World Championships in Athletics appearances (overview)
- 1976; 1980; 1983; 1987; 1991; 1993; 1995; 1997; 1999; 2001; 2003; 2005; 2007; 2009; 2011; 2013; 2015; 2017; 2019; 2022; 2023; 2025

Italy competed at the 1991 World Championships in Athletics in Tokyo, Japan from 23 August to 1 September 1991.

== Medalists ==
Athlete	Gendre	Event	Medal
Maurizio Damilano	Men	20 Kilometres Race Walk	Gold

== Finalists ==
Italy national athletics team ranked 6th (with 14 finalists) in the IAAF placing table. Rank obtained by assigning eight points in the first place and so on to the eight finalists.

Rank	Country	1st place, gold medalist(s)	2nd place, silver medalist(s)	3rd place, bronze medalist(s)	4	5	6	7	8	Pts
10	Italy	1	0	0	1	1	3	5	3	39

== Results ==
Italy participated with 48 athletes by winning a medal.

Finalists (first eight positions)

=== Men (33) ===
Track and road events
Event	Athlete	Result	Performances	Notes
100 m	Ezio Madonia	Semi	10.38 SF; 10.24 QF; 10.43 Heat	
200 m	Stefano Tilli	Quarter	20.92 QF; 20.89 Heat	
200 m	Sandro Floris	Heat	21.10	
400 m	Andrea Nuti	Quarter	DSQ QF; 46.80 Heat	
800 m	Giuseppe D'Urso	Quarter	1:46.82	
1500 m	Gennaro Di Napoli	8th	3:36.56 F; 3.40.34 SF; 3:38.63 QF	
1500 m	Davide Tirelli	Semi	3:43.08 SF; 3:41.77 QF	
5000 m	Stefano Mei	Final	DNF F; 13:54.35 SF	
10,000 m	Salvatore Antibo	20th	28:52.41 F; 28:26.72 SF	
400 m hs	Fabrizio Mori	Semi	48.92 QF	
400 m hs	Paolo Bellino	Quarter	50.74	
3000 m st	Angelo Carosi	7th	8:20.80 F; 8:28.35 SF	
3000 m st	Francesco Panetta	8th	8:26.79 F; 8:27.25 SF	
4 × 100 m relay	(Italy) National Team; Mario Longo; Ezio Madonia; Sandro Floris; Stefano Tilli	5th	38.52 F; 38.74 SF	
4 × 400 m relay	(Italy) National Team; Fabio Grossi; Marco Vaccari; Alessandro Aimar; Andrea Nuti	Semi	3:02.72	
Marathon	Salvatore Bettiol	6th	2:15:58	
Marathon	Gelindo Bordin	8th	2:17:03	
Marathon	Alessio Faustini	1DNF	NM	
20 km walk	|Maurizio Damilano	1st	1:19.37	CR; PB
20 km walk	Giovanni De Benedictis	4th	1:20:29	
20 km walk	Walter Arena	7th	1:21:01	
50 km walk	Giuseppe De Gaetano	6th	4:03:43	
50 km walk	Sandro Bellucci	DNF	NM	
50 km walk	Giovanni Perricelli	DNF	NM	

Field events
Event	Athlete	Result	Performances	Notes
Long jump	Giovanni Evangelisti	7th	8.01 m F; 8.03 m Q	
Long jump	Fausto Frigerio	Qual.	7.88 m	
Shot put	Alessandro Andrei	11th	18.73 m F; 19.00 m Q	
Discus throw	Marco Martino	Qual.	60.34 m	
Discus throw	Luciano Zerbini	Qual.	58.34 m	
Hammer throw	Enrico Sgrulletti	Qual.	72.40 m	
Decathlon	Marco Baffi	22nd	6209 pts	

=== Women (15) ===
Track and road events
Event	Athlete	Result	Performances	Notes
100 m	Rossella Tarolo	Quarter	11.75 QF; 11.54 Heat	
200 m	Marisa Masullo	Quarter	23.70 QF; 23.75 Heat	
800 m	Gabriella Dorio	Quarter	2:07.54	
3000 m	Roberta Brunet	6th	8:42.64 F; 8:51.41 SF	
10,000 m	Rosanna Munerotto	Semi	32:44,43 F; 32:05.75 SF	
400 m hs	Irmgard Trojer	Semi	55.66 SF; 55.77 QF	
4 × 100 m relay	(Italy) National Team; Marisa Masullo; Donatella Dal Bianco; Daniela Ferrian; Rossella Tarolo	7th	43.76 F;43.71 SF	
Marathon	Laura Fogli	DNF	NM	
Marathon	Anna Villani	DNF	NM	
10 km walk	Annarita Sidoti	7h	44:09	
10 km walk	Ileana Salvador	9th	44:18	

Field events
Event	Athlete	Result	Performances	Notes
Long jump	Valentina Uccheddu	Qual.	6.48 m	
Shot put	Agnese Maffeis	Qual.	16.99 m	
Discus throw	Agnese Maffeis	Qual.	56.36 m	
Heptathlon	Ifeoma Ozoeze	15th	6056 ptsNM	
