= Italy at the 1999 World Championships in Athletics =

- WA code: ITA
- National federation: FIDAL
- Website: www.fidal.it

in Sevilla
- Competitors: 43 (30 men, 13 women)
- Medals Ranked 6th: Gold 2 Silver 2 Bronze 0 Total 4

World Championships in Athletics appearances (overview)
- 1976; 1980; 1983; 1987; 1991; 1993; 1995; 1997; 1999; 2001; 2003; 2005; 2007; 2009; 2011; 2013; 2015; 2017; 2019; 2022; 2023; 2025

Italy competed at the 1999 World Championships in Athletics in Sevilla, Spain from 20 to 29 August 1999.

== Medalists ==
Athlete	Gendre	Event	Medal
Fabrizio Mori	Men	400 Metres Hurdles	Gold
Ivano Brugnetti	Men	50 Kilometres Race Walk	Gold
Vincenzo Modica	Men	Marathon	Silver
Fiona May	Women	Long Jump	Silver

== Finalists ==
The largest team ranked 9th (with 13 finalists) in the IAAF placing table. Rank obtained by assigning eight points in the first place and so on to the eight finalists.

Rank	Country	1st place, gold medalist(s)	2nd place, silver medalist(s)	3rd place, bronze medalist(s)	4	5	6	7	8	Pts
9	Italy	2	2	0	0	3	3	1	2	55

== Results ==
Italy participated with 66 athletes by winning three medals.

Finalists (first eight positions)

=== Men (30) ===
Track and field events
Event	Athlete	Result	Performances	Notes
100 m	Stefano Tilli	Quarter	(5. nel 1qf with 10.26, 4. in 3b with 10.35)	
800 m	Andrea Longo	6th	with 1:45.33 (2. in 1sf with 1:45.65, 1. in 3b with 1:45.01)	
1500 m	Giuseppe D'Urso	Haat	(13. in 3b with 3:50.71)	
5000 m	Salvatore Vincenti	Haat	(15. in 2b with 14:03.36)	
Marathon	Vincenzo Modica	2nd	with 2h14:03	
Marathon	Danilo Goffi	5th	with 2h14:50	
Marathon	Daniele Caimmi	10th	with 2h16:23	
Marathon	Roberto Barbi	20th	with 2h18:13	
Marathon	Giovanni Ruggiero	25th	with 2h19:34	
3000 m st	Giuseppe Maffei	10th	with 8:22.65 (3. in 3b with 8:15.19)	
110 m hs	Andrea Giocondi	Quarter	(6. nel 4qf with 13.61, 6. in 6b with 13.71)	
110 m hs	Emiliano Pizzoli	Haat	(6. in 4b with 13.79)	
400 m hs	Fabrizio Mori	1st	with 47.72 (2. in 2sf with 48.29, 1. in 3b with 49.07)	
Pole vault	Maurilio Mariani	Qual.	with 5.40	
Long jump	Nicola Trentin	Qual.	with 7.70	
Triple jump	Paolo Camossi	5th	with 17.29 (16.79 in qual.)	
Shot put	Paolo Dal Soglio	Qual.	with 19.48	
Discus throw	Diego Fortuna	Qual.	with 58.52	
Hammer throw	Nicola Vizzoni	7th	with 78.31 (75.81 in qual.)	
Hammer throw	Loris Paoluzzi	Qual.	with 74.26	
20 km walk	Alessandro Gandellini	5th	with 1h24:51	
20 km walk	Giovanni De Benedictis	8th	with 1h25:33	
20 km walk	Michele Didoni	10th	with 1h26:00	
50 km walk	Ivano Brugnetti	1st	with 3h47:54	
50 km walk	Arturo Di Mezza	6th	with 3h53:50	
50 km walk	Giovanni Perricelli	DNF	NM	
4 × 100 m relay	(Italy) National Team; Luca Verdecchia; Massimiliano Donati; Maurizio Checcucci; Andrea Colombo	Haat	(3. in 1b with 38.98)	

=== Women (13) ===
Track and field events
Event	Athlete	Result	Performances	Notes
200 m	Manuela Levorato	Haat	(7. in 1sf with 22.70, 4. nel 2qf with 22.60, 3. in 6b with 22.91)	
400 m	Virna De Angeli	Quarter	7. nel 3qf with 52.78, 4. in 1b with 52.60)	
800 m	Patrizia Spuri	Haat	(4. in 2b with 2:01.00)	
400 m hs	Monica Niederstatter	Semi	(8. in 2sf with 55.57, 5. in 3b with 55.10)	
Long jump	Fiona May	2nd	with 6.94 (7.04 in qual.)	
Shot put	Mara Rosolen	Qual.	with 17.84	
Heptathlon	Gertrud Bacher	14th	with 6.055 pts	
20 km walk	Erica Alfridi	6th	with 1h32:04	
20 km walk	Elisabetta Perrone	21st	with 1h36:24	
20 km walk	Rossella Giordano	27th	with 1h38:06	
20 km walk	Annarita Sidoti	DNF	NM	
4 × 400 m relay	(Italy) National Team; Virna De Angeli; Patrizia Spuri; Francesca Carbone; Monica Niederstatter; Danielle Perpoli	8th	with 3:29.56 (2. in 3b with 3:31.67)	
