= Italy at the 1995 World Championships in Athletics =

- WA code: ITA
- National federation: FIDAL
- Website: www.fidal.it

in Gothenburg
- Competitors: 49 (30 men, 19 women)
- Medals Ranked 3rd: Gold 2 Silver 2 Bronze 2 Total 6

World Championships in Athletics appearances (overview)
- 1976; 1980; 1983; 1987; 1991; 1993; 1995; 1997; 1999; 2001; 2003; 2005; 2007; 2009; 2011; 2013; 2015; 2017; 2019; 2022; 2023; 2025

Italy competed at the 1995 World Championships in Athletics in Gothenburg, Sweden from 5 to 13 August 1995.

== Medalists ==
The result in the medal table and the number of medals totaled, till to 2017, is the top all-time result at the World Championships for the Italy national athletics team.

Athlete	Gendre	Event	Medal
Michele Didoni	Men	20 Kilometres Race Walk	Gold
Fiona May	Women	Long Jump	Gold
Giovanni Perricelli	Men	50 Kilometres Race Walk	Silver
Elisabetta Perrone	Women	10 Kilometres Race Walk	Silver
(Italy) National Team; Giovanni Puggioni; Ezio Madonia; Angelo Cipolloni; Sandro Floris	Men	4×100 Metres Relay	Bronze
Ornella Ferrara	Woman	Marathon	Bronze

== Finalists ==
Italy national athletics team ranked 6th (with 13 finalists) in the IAAF placing table. Rank obtained by assigning eight points in the first place and so on to the eight finalists.

Rank	Country	1st place, gold medalist(s)	2nd place, silver medalist(s)	3rd place, bronze medalist(s)	4	5	6	7	8	Pts
6	Italy	2	2	2	1	2	1	2	1	63

== Results ==
Italy participated with 49 athletes by winning six medals.

Finalists (first eight positions)

=== Men (30) ===
Track and field events
Event	Athlete	Result	Performances	Notes
400 m	Andrea Nuti	Quarter	(5. in 3qf with 45.89, 2. in 7b with 46.25)	
800 m	Andrea Giocondi	7th	with 1:47.78 (3. in 1sf with 1:49.45, 3. in 1b with 1:46.44)	
800 m	Davide Cadoni	Semi	(8. in 2sf with 1:53.67, 2. in 5b with 1:48.25)	
800 m	Giuseppe D'Urso	Heat	(4. in 4b with 1:47.43)	
5000 m	Gennaro Di Napoli	11th	with 13:46.51 (1. in 2b with 13:23.87)	
10,000 m	Stefano Baldini	18th	with 28:08.39 (8. in 2b with 27:50.27)	
Marathon	Luca Barzaghi	33rd	with 2h23:51	
Marathon	Luigi Di Lello	Ret.	NM	
3000 m st	Angelo Carosi	5th	with 8:14.85 (1. in 1sf with 8:19.73, 2. in 3b with 8:23.93)	
3000 m st	Alessandro Lambruschini	10th	with 8:22.64 (5. in 2sf with 8:27.75, 6. in 2b with 8:29.36)	
400 m hs	Fabrizio Mori	Semi	(disqu. in 1sf, 1. in 1b with 49.37)	
400 m hs	Laurent Ottoz	Semi	(5. in 2sf with 48.94, 1. in 4b with 48.90)	
400 m hs	Patrick Ottoz	Haat	(4. in 2b with 49.65)	
Long jump	Roberto Coltri	Qual.	with 7.65	
shot put	Paolo Dal Soglio	9th	with 19.38 (19.47 in qual.)	
shot put	Alessandro Andrei	Qual.	with 18.74	
shot put	Corrado Fantini	Qual.	with 17.89	
Discus throw	Diego Fortuna	Qual.	with 58.74	
Hammer throw	Enrico Sgrulletti	Qual.	with 72.60	
20 km walk	Michele Didoni	1st	with 1h19:59	
20 km walk	Enrico Lang	15th	with 1h24:43	
20 km walk	Giovanni De Benedictis	DQ	NM	
50 km walk	Giovanni Perricelli	2nd	with 3h45:11	
50 km walk	Arturo Di Mezza	7th	with 3h49:46	
50 km walk	Giovanni De Benedictis	DQ		
4 × 100 m relay	(Italy) National Team; Giovanni Puggioni; Ezio Madonia; Angelo Cipolloni; Sandro Floris	3rd	with 39.07 (2. in 2sf with 38.41, 1. in 4b with 39.00)	
4 × 400 m relay	(Italy) National Team; Marco Vaccari; Laurent Ottoz; Alessandro Aimar; Andrea Nuti	Haat	(5. in 1b with 3:02.01)	

=== Women (19) ===
Track and field events
Event	Athlete	Result	Performances	Notes
5000 m	Silvia Sommaggio	Heat	(8. in 2b with 15:20.89)	
10,000 m	Maria Guida	4th	with 31:27.82 (4. in 2b with 32:34.28)	
Marathon	Ornella Ferrara	3rd	with 2h30:11	
100 m hs	Carla Tuzzi	Heat	(5. in 1b with 13.32)	
Long jump	Fiona May	1st	with 6.98w (6.76w in qual.)	
Long jump	Valentina Uccheddu	5th	with 6.76 (6.53 in qual.)	
Triple jump	Barbara Lah	8th	with 14.18w (14.17 in qual.)	
Shot put	Mara Rosolen	Qual.	with 16.90	
heptathlon	Karin Periginelli	20th	with 5613 pts	
10 km walk	Elisabetta Perrone	2nd	with 42:16	
10 km walk	Rossella Giordano	6th	with 42:26	
10 km walk	Annarita Sidoti	13th	with 44:06	
4 × 100 m relay	(Italy) National Team; Carla Tuzzi; Rossella Farina; Laura Ardissone; Manuela Levorato	Heat	(retired in 2b)	
4 × 400 m relay	(Italy) National Team; Francesca Carbone; Patrizia Spuri; Danielle Perpoli; Virna De Angeli	Heat	(7. in 2b with 3:30.88)	
