= Italy at the 2009 World Championships in Athletics =

- WA code: ITA
- National federation: Federazione Italiana di Atletica Leggera
- Website: www.fidal.it

in Berlin
- Competitors: 35 (20 men, 15 women)
- Medals Ranked 33rd: Gold 0 Silver 0 Bronze 1 Total 1

World Championships in Athletics appearances (overview)
- 1976; 1980; 1983; 1987; 1991; 1993; 1995; 1997; 1999; 2001; 2003; 2005; 2007; 2009; 2011; 2013; 2015; 2017; 2019; 2022; 2023; 2025

Italy competed at the 2009 World Championships in Athletics, held from August 15 to August 23. On August 3, the Italian national athletics federation (FIDAL) revealed the final team composed of 40 athletes (24 men and 16 women), but on 8 August, after a last test competition in Grosseto, Andrew Howe, in accordance with FIDAL, decided not to compete in Berlin. Just before publishing the team, Faloci, a discus thrower, also decided not to compete.

Italy did not win a single medal in the championships, the first time ever in the history of the World Athletics Championships that Italy have failed to win a medal, the first time since Melbourne 1956 in any major championships (World, Olympics or European), but the medals of some of the athletics world championship races in 2009 were otherwise awarded 24 March 2016 as a result of doping disqualifications. Among these reallocations also the medals of 20 km walk, which saw the Italian Giorgio Rubino, initially 4th, get the bronze medal This fact, 7 years after the event, allowed Italy to clear the zero in the Medal table. On 6 February 2018 IAAF disqualified Anna Chicherova for doping, 2nd in the high jump, so also Antonietta Di Martino was advanced to bronze medal.

== Medalists ==
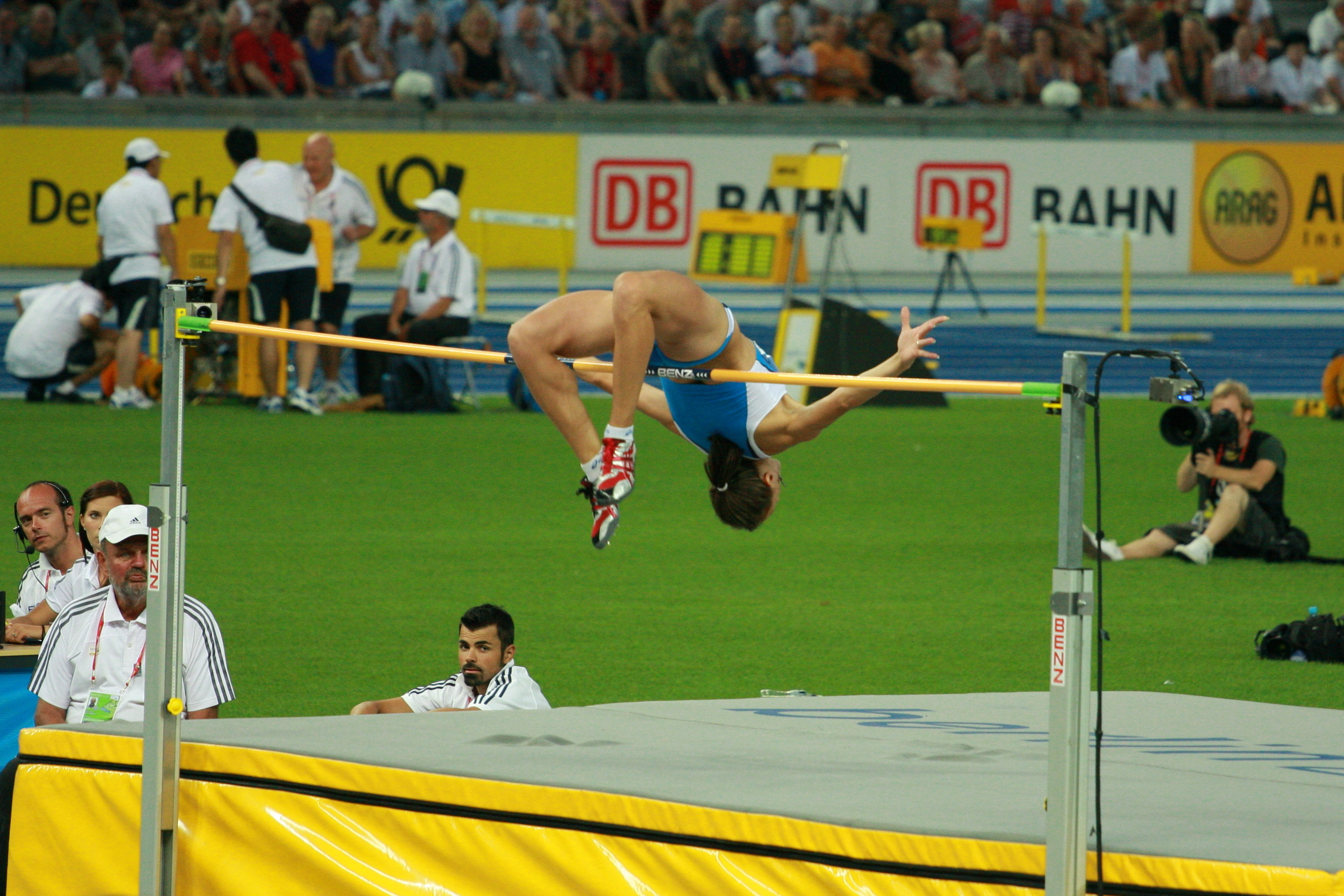
Di Martino in her winning jump during the race.

Athlete	Gendre	Event	Medal
Giorgio Rubino	Men	20 Kilometres Race Walk	BRONZE
Antonietta Di Martino	Women	High jump	BRONZE

== Finalists ==
Italy national athletics team ranked 17th (with 9 finalists) in the IAAF placing table. Rank obtained by assigning eight points in the first place and so on to the eight finalists.

Rank	Country	1st place, gold medalist(s)	2nd place, silver medalist(s)	3rd place, bronze medalist(s)	4	5	6	7	8	Pts
17	Italy	0	0	1	1	0	2	3	2	25

== Results ==
For the Italian national team participated at the events 35 athletes, 20 men and 15 women.

=== Men (20) ===
Track events

Event	Athletes	Heat Round 1		Heat Round 2		Semifinal		Final	
Event	Athletes	Result	Rank	Result	Rank	Result	Rank	Result	Rank
100 m	Simone Collio	10.49	4	did not advance					
100 m	Fabio Cerutti	10.36	3	10.37	7	did not advance			
100 m	Emanuele Di Gregorio	10.35	2	10.26	4	did not advance			
200 m	Matteo Galvan	DNS	DNS	did not advance					
400 m	Matteo Galvan	45.86	24	-		46.87	24	did not advance	
800 m	Lukas Rifesser	1:53.31	18	did not advance					
1500 m	Christian Obrist	3:43:41	8	-		did not advance			
5000 m	Daniele Meucci	13:37:49	14	-		did not advance			
20km walk	Ivano Brugnetti	-		-				DNF	DNF
20km walk	Jean-Jacques Nkouloukidi	-		-				1:23:07	21
20km walk	Giorgio Rubino	-		-				1:19:50	3
50km walk	Diego Cafagna	-		-				4:08:04	28
50km walk	Marco De Luca	-		-				3:46:31	7
50km walk	Alex Schwazer	-		-				DNF	DNF
4 × 100 m relay	Italy; Roberto Donati; Simone Collio; Emanuele Di Gregorio; Fabio Cerutti	38:52	1	-				38:54	6

Field events

Event	Athletes	Qualification		Final	
Event	Athletes	Result	Rank	Result	Rank
Pole vault	Giuseppe Gibilisco	5.65	5	5.65	7
Triple jump	Fabrizio Donato	15.81	41	did not advance	
Triple jump	Daniele Greco	16.18	34	did not advance	
Triple jump	Fabrizio Schembri	16.88	15	did not advance	
High jump	Giulio Ciotti	2.27	9	2.23	11
Hammer throw	Nicola Vizzoni	76.95	7	73.70	9

=== Women (15) ===
Track events

Event	Athletes	Heat Round 1		Heat Round 2		Semifinal		Final	
Event	Athletes	Result	Rank	Result	Rank	Result	Rank	Result	Rank
400 m	Libania Grenot	51.45	2	-		50.85	4	did not advance	
800 m	Daniela Reina	2:06:30	5	-		did not advance			
800 m	Elisa Cusma	2:02:33	1	-		2:00:61	1	1:58:81	6
5000 m	Silvia Weissteiner	15:20:88	12	-				15:09:74	7
3000 m s'chase	Elena Romagnolo	9:56:61	14	-				did not advance	
20km Walk	Elisa Rigaudo	-		-				1:31:52	8
20km Walk	Valentina Trapletti	-		-				1:35:33	17
4 × 400 m relay	Italy; Marta Milani; Daniela Reina; Maria Enrica Spacca; Libania Grenot	3:31:05	5	-				did not advance	

Field and combined events

Event	Athletes	Qualification		Final	
Event	Athletes	Result	Rank	Result	Rank
High jump	Antonietta Di Martino	1.95	4	1.99	3
Pole vault	Anna Giordano Bruno	4.50	13	did not advance	
Triple jump	Magdelín Martínez	13.87	21	did not advance	
Hammer throw	Clarissa Claretti	70.01	12	71.56	8
Hammer throw	Silvia Salis	68.55	17	did not advance	
Hammer throw	Chiara Rosa	17.89	16	did not advance	
