= Italy at the 2022 World Athletics Championships =

Italy team at athletics event

Italy at the 2022 World Championships in Athletics
- WA code: ITA
- National federation: FIDAL
- Website: www.fidal.it

in (United States) Eugene
- Competitors: 60 (29 men, 31 women)
- Medals Ranked 19th: Gold 1 Silver 0 Bronze 1 Total 2

World Championships in Athletics appearances (overview)
- 1976; 1980; 1983; 1987; 1991; 1993; 1995; 1997; 1999; 2001; 2003; 2005; 2007; 2009; 2011; 2013; 2015; 2017; 2019; 2022; 2023; 2025

Italy national athletics team competed at the 2022 World Athletics Championships in Eugene, Oregon, from 15 to 24 July.

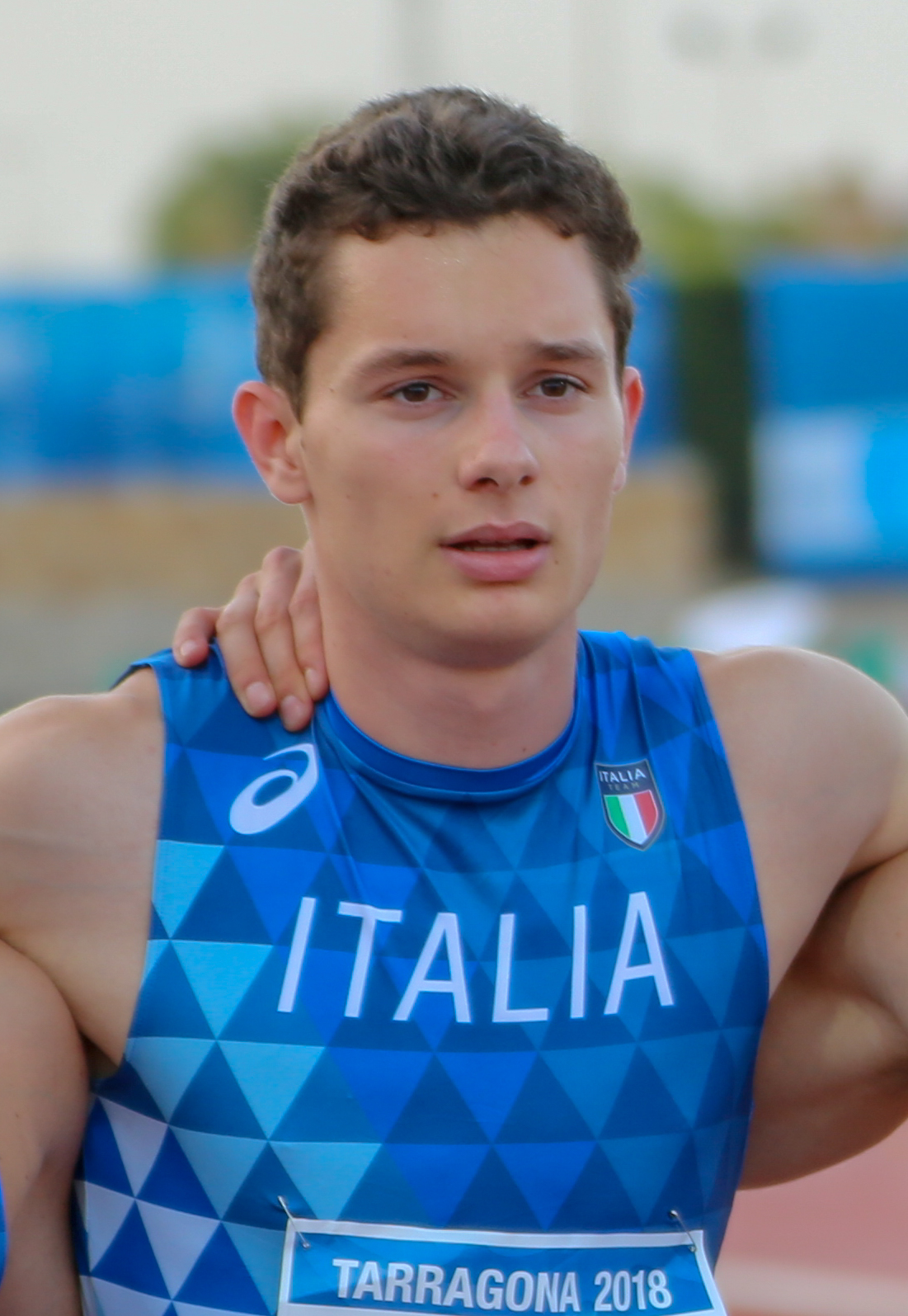
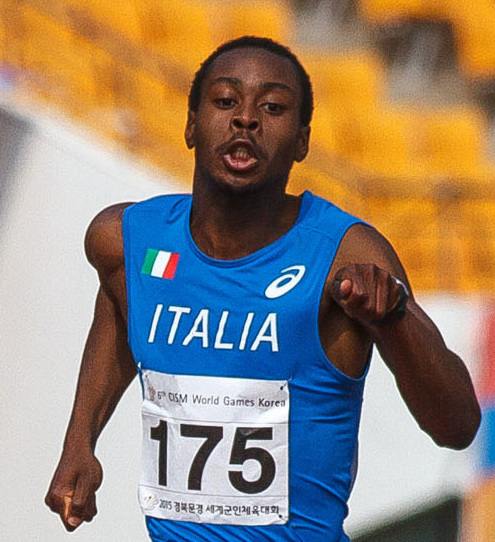
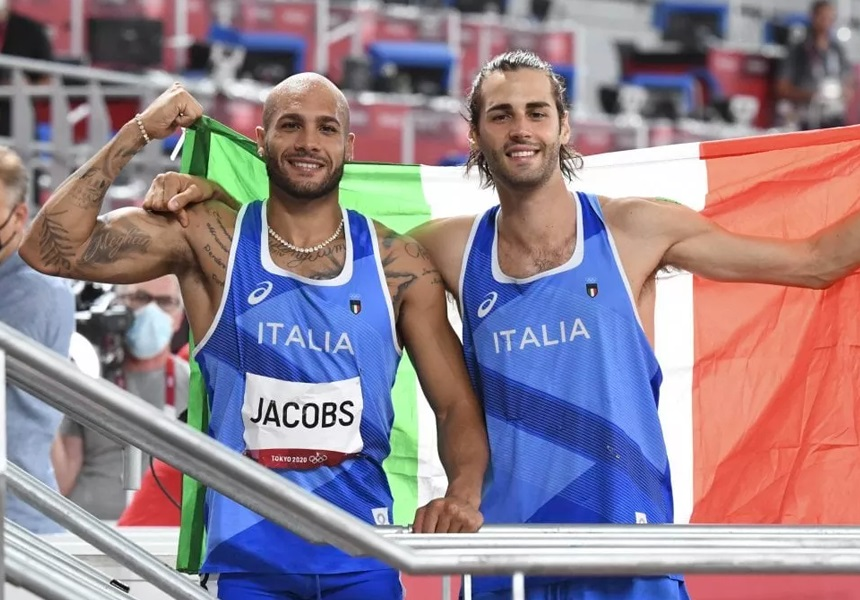
Filippo Tortu, Faustino Desalu, Marcell Jacobs and Gianmarco Tamberi, four Olympic champions competing at this edition of the Championships.

== Medalists ==
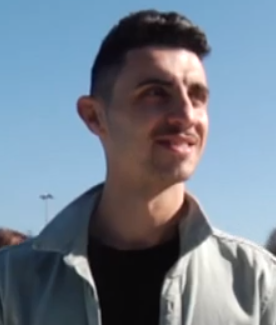
Massimo Stano wins a men's gold medal for Italy 19 years after Beppe Gibilisco who was the last.

Medal	Name	Event	Date
Gold	Massimo Stano	35 km walk	24 July
Bronze	Elena Vallortigara	High jump	20 July

== Placing table ==
Italy team finished in 12th position in placing table.

Rank	Country	1st place, gold medalist(s)	2nd place, silver medalist(s)	3rd place, bronze medalist(s)	4	5	6	7	8	Pts
12	Italy	1	0	1	3	1	0	2	2	39

== Team ==
On 4 July 2022, the technical commissioner of the Italian national team Antonio La Torre issued the list of the athletes called up for the Eugene World Championships, 60 athletes (29 men and 31 women).

== Results ==
Top eight

=== Men ===
Track and road events

Athlete	Event	Heat		Semi-final		Final	
Athlete	Event	Result	Rank	Result	Rank	Result	Rank
Chituru Ali	100 metres	10.40 (−0.1)	42	did not advance			
Marcell Jacobs	100 metres	10.04 (+0.2) SB	10 Q	DNS		did not advance	
Fausto Desalu	200 metres	20.63 (+0.5)	30	did not advance			
Filippo Tortu	200 metres	20.18 (+1.0)	9 Q	20.10 (+0.3) PB	9	did not advance	
Davide Re	400 metres	46.49	31	did not advance			
Edoardo Scotti	400 metres	46.46	29	did not advance			
Catalin Tecuceanu	800 metres	1:44.83 PB	4 q	1:46.31	16	did not advance	
Mario Lambrughi	400 metres hurdles	50.18	24	did not advance			
Ahmed Abdelwahed	3000 metres steeplechase	8:21.04	14 q	—		8:33.43	12
Francesco Fortunato	20 km walk	—				1:22:50	15
Gianluca Picchiottino	20 km walk	—				1:28:33	32
Andrea Agrusti	35 km walk	—					DSQ
Massimo Stano	35 km walk	—				2:23:14	1st place, gold medalist(s)
Lorenzo Patta; Filippo Tortu; Fausto Desalu; Chituru Ali	4 × 100 metres relay	38.74 SB	10	—		did not advance	
Lorenzo Benati; Vladimir Aceti; Brayan Lopez; Edoardo Scotti	4 × 400 metres relay	3:03.43 SB	10	—		did not advance	

Field events

Athlete	Event	Qualification		Final	
Athlete	Event	Distance	Position	Distance	Position
Marco Fassinotti	High jump	2.25	16	did not advance	
Gianmarco Tamberi	High jump	2.28	11 q	2.33	4
Tobia Bocchi	Triple jump	16.58	15	did not advance	
Andrea Dallavalle	Triple jump	16.86	7 q	17.25	4
Emmanuel Ihemeje	Triple jump	17.13	3 Q SB	17.17	5
Leonardo Fabbri	Shot put	19.73	22	did not advance	
Nicholas Ponzio	Shot put	21.35	4 Q	20.81	9

=== Women ===
Track and road events

Athlete	Event	Heat		Semi-final		Final	
Athlete	Event	Result	Rank	Result	Rank	Result	Rank
Zaynab Dosso	100 metres	11.26 (+0.2)	26 Q	11.28 (+0.4)	21	did not advance	
Dalia Kaddari	200 metres	22.75 (+2.5)	15 Q	22.86 (−0.1)	19	did not advance	
Alice Mangione	400 metres	52.72	34	did not advance			
Elena Bellò	800 metres	2:02.87	34 qR	2:00.34	13	did not advance	
Federica Del Buono	1500 metres	4:08.42	28	did not advance			
Gaia Sabbatini	1500 metres	4:07.82	27 Q	DQ		did not advance	
Sintayehu Vissa	1500 metres	4:07.33	22	did not advance			
Elisa Di Lazzaro	100 metres hurdles						
Ayomide Folorunso	400 metres hurdles	54.69	6 Q	54.34 NR	10	did not advance	
Linda Olivieri	400 metres hurdles	56.09	23 q	56.04	23	did not advance	
Rebecca Sartori	400 metres hurdles	55.72	19 q	55.90	22	did not advance	
Nicole Colombi	20 km walk	—				DQ	
Valentina Trapletti	20 km walk	—				1:29:54	8
Zaynab Dosso; Dalia Kaddari; Anna Bongiorni; Vittoria Fontana	4 × 100 metres relay	42.71 NR	7 q	—		42.92	8
Anna Polinari; Ayomide Folorunso; Virginia Troiani; Alice Mangione	4 × 100 metres relay	3:28.72 SB	6 q	—		3:26.45 SB	7

Field events

Athlete	Event	Qualification		Final	
Athlete	Event	Distance	Position	Distance	Position
Elena Vallortigara	High jump	1.93	1 q	2.00 SB	3rd place, bronze medalist(s)
Roberta Bruni	Pole vault	4.35	16	did not advance	
Elisa Molinarolo	Pole vault	4.35	16	did not advance	
Larissa Iapichino	Long jump	6.60	14	did not advance	
Ottavia Cestonaro	Triple jump	13.63	22	did not advance	
Daisy Osakue	Discus throw	56.74	28	did not advance	
Sara Fantini	Hammer throw	72.38	6 q	73.18	4

=== Mixed ===
Athlete	Event	Heat		Final	
Athlete	Event	Result	Rank	Result	Rank
Alice Mangione; Ayomide Folorunso; Lorenzo Benati; Brayan Lopez	4 × 400 m relay	3:13.89 SB	6 q	3:16.45	7

== See also ==
- Italy at the 2022 European Athletics Championships
