= Italy at the 2005 World Championships in Athletics =

- WA code: ITA
- National federation: FIDAL
- Website: www.fidal.it

in Helsinki
- Competitors: 49 (27 men, 22 women)
- Medals Ranked 33rd: Gold 0 Silver 0 Bronze 1 Total 1

World Championships in Athletics appearances (overview)
- 1976; 1980; 1983; 1987; 1991; 1993; 1995; 1997; 1999; 2001; 2003; 2005; 2007; 2009; 2011; 2013; 2015; 2017; 2019; 2022; 2023; 2025

Italy competed at the 2005 World Championships in Athletics in Paris, France from 6 to 14 August 2005. The nation sent a delegation of 49 athletes (27 men and 22 women) and won one medal at the competition. Alex Schwazer was the bronze medallist in the men's 50 kilometres race walk and he achieved a national record of 3:41:54 hours in the process. It was an unexpected medal, as Schwazer knocked nearly twenty minutes off his previous best that year. Among other Italian performances, three athletes finished fifth in field event finals: Nicola Ciotti (men's high jump), Giuseppe Gibilisco (men's pole vault) and Zahra Bani (women's javelin throw). Excluding the straight finals in the marathon and walks, six Italians reached the final of their track and field event.

This was Italy's worst performance on the medal table at the World Championships at that point and presaged the outcome of no medals at the 2015 World Championships in Athletics.

== Medalists ==
Athlete	Gender	Event	Medal
Alex Schwazer	Men	50 km walk	Bronze

== Men ==
Event	Athlete	Round	Position	Result	Notes
100 m	Simone Collio	Heats	Q	10.27	
100 m	Simone Collio	Quarterfinals	Eliminated	10.60	
200 m	Andrew Howe	Heats	Q	21.08	
200 m	Andrew Howe	Quarterfinals	Eliminated	21.19	
200 m	Koura Kaba Fantoni	Heats	Eliminated	21.10	
400 m	Andrea Barberi	Heats	q	45.70	PB
400 m	Andrea Barberi	Semifinals	Eliminated	47.10	
800 m	Maurizio Bobbato	Heats	Eliminated	1:48.36	
Marathon	Ottaviano Andriani	Final	17th	2:16:29	
Marathon	Ruggero Pertile	Final	35th	2:21:34	
Marathon	Stefano Baldini	Final	DNF		
Marathon	Migidio Bourifa	Final	DNF		
Marathon	Alberico Di Cecco	Final	DNF		
20 km walk	Lorenzo Civallero	Final	14th	1:22:52	SB
20 km walk	Ivano Brugnetti	Final	DNF		
50 km walk	Alex Schwazer	Final	3rd place, bronze medalist(s)	3:41:54	NR
50 km walk	Marco De Luca	Final	13th	3:58:32	
50 km walk	Diego Cafagna	Final	DQ		
High jump	Nicola Ciotti	Qualifying	q	2.27 m	
High jump	Nicola Ciotti	Final	5th	2.29 m	
High jump	Andrea Bettinelli	Qualifying	Eliminated	2.24 m	
High jump	Alessandro Talotti	Qualifying	Eliminated	NM	
Pole vault	Giuseppe Gibilisco	Qualifying	q	5.45 m	
Pole vault	Giuseppe Gibilisco	Final	5th	5.50 m	
Triple jump	Paolo Camossi	Qualifying	Eliminated	16.23 m	
Hammer throw	Nicola Vizzoni	Qualifying	Eliminated	70.77 m	
Javelin throw	Francesco Pignata	Qualifying	Eliminated	72.17 m	
4 × 100 m relay	Luca Verdecchia; Simone Collio; Massimiliano Donati; Andrew Howe	Heats	DQ		
4 × 400 m relay	Claudio Licciardello; Edoardo Vallet; Luca Galletti; Andrea Barberi	Heats	Eliminated	3:04.40	

== Women ==
Event	Athlete	Round	Position	Result	Notes
100 m	Manuela Levorato	Heats	Q	11.46	
100 m	Manuela Levorato	Quarterfinals	Eliminated	11.54	
800 m	Elisa Cusma	Heats	Eliminated	2:05.95	
1500 m	Eleonora Berlanda	Heats	Eliminated	4:14.54	
400 m hurdles	Benedetta Ceccarelli	Heats	Q	56.00	
400 m hurdles	Benedetta Ceccarelli	Semifinals	Eliminated	55.41	SB
400 m hurdles	Monika Niederstätter	Heats	Q	57.18	
400 m hurdles	Monika Niederstätter	Semifinals	Eliminated	56.14	
Marathon	Rosaria Console	Final	19th	2:32:47	
20 km walk	Elisa Rigaudo	Final	7th	1:29:52	
20 km walk	Gisella Orsini	Final	25th	1:35:05	
Long jump	Fiona May	Qualifying	Eliminated	6.51 m	
Triple jump	Magdelín Martínez	Qualifying	Q	14.46 m	
Triple jump	Magdelín Martínez	Final	8th	14.31 m	
Triple jump	Simona La Mantia	Qualifying	Eliminated	14.00 m	
Shot put	Assunta Legnante	Qualifying	q	18.06 m	
Shot put	Assunta Legnante	Final	10th	16.99 m	
Shot put	Cristiana Checchi	Qualifying	Eliminated	16.67 m	
Shot put	Chiara Rosa	Qualifying	Eliminated	17.32 m	
Hammer throw	Clarissa Claretti	Qualifying	q	68.21 m	
Hammer throw	Clarissa Claretti	Final	8th	64.76 m	
Hammer throw	Ester Balassini	Qualifying	Eliminated	NM	
Javelin throw	Zahra Bani	Qualifying	q	60.09 m	
Javelin throw	Zahra Bani	Final	5th	62.75 m	PB
Javelin throw	Claudia Coslovich	Qualifying	Eliminated	55.78 m	
4 × 100 m relay	Elena Sordelli; Vincenza Calì; Manuela Grillo; Maria Aurora Salvagno	Heats	Eliminated	44.03	
