= Italy at the 1983 World Championships in Athletics =

- WA code: ITA
- National federation: FIDAL
- Website: www.fidal.it

in Helsinki
- Competitors: 39 (27 men, 12 women)
- Medals Ranked 8th: Gold 1 Silver 1 Bronze 1 Total 3

World Championships in Athletics appearances (overview)
- 1976; 1980; 1983; 1987; 1991; 1993; 1995; 1997; 1999; 2001; 2003; 2005; 2007; 2009; 2011; 2013; 2015; 2017; 2019; 2022; 2023; 2025

Italy competed at the 1983 World Championships in Athletics in Helsinki, Finland from 7–14 August 1983.

== Medalists ==
Athlete	Gendre	Event	Medal
Alberto Cova	Men	10,000 Metres	Gold
(Italy) National Team; Stefano Tilli; Carlo Simionato; Pierfrancesco Pavoni; Pietro Mennea	Men	4×100 Metres Relay	Silver
Pietro Mennea	Men	200 Metres	Bronze

== Finalists ==
Italy national athletics team ranked 8th (with 12 finalists) in the IAAF placing table. Score obtained by assigning eight points in the first place and so on to the eight finalists.

Rank	Country	1st place, gold medalist(s)	2nd place, silver medalist(s)	3rd place, bronze medalist(s)	4	5	6	7	8	Pts
8	Italy	1	1	1	0	1	2	6	0	43

== Results ==
Finalists (first eight positions)

=== Men (27) ===
Track and road events
Event	Athlete	Result	Performances	Notes
100 m	Pierfrancesco Pavoni	Quarter	10.44 QF; 10.33 Heat	
200 m	Pietro Mennea	3rd	20.51 F; 20.69 SF; 20.68 QF; 20.80 Heat	
200 m	Carlo Simionato	7th	20.69 F; 20.60 SF; 20.75 QF; 20.76 Heat	
400 m	Roberto Ribaud	Heat	DQ	
800 m	Donato Sabia	Heat	1:47.62	
1500 m	Stefano Mei	Semi	3:39.93 SF; 3:41.78 QF	
1500 m	Claudio Patrignani	Semi	3:38.36 SF; 3:38.35 QF	
5000 m	Salvatore Antibo	13th	13:40.76 F; 13:33.12 SF; 13:44.05 QF	
10,000 m	Alberto Cova	1st	28:01.04	
110 m hs	Daniele Fontecchio	Quarter	14.05	
3000 m st	Mariano Scartezzini	9th	8:21.17 F; 8:23.30 SF; 8:28.27 QF	
4×100 m relay	(Italy) National Team; Stefano Tilli; Carlo Simionato; Pierfrancesco Pavoni; Pietro Mennea	2nd	38.37 F; 38.74 SF; 39:40 QF	NR
4×400 m relay	(Italy) National Team; Stefano Malinverni; Donato Sabia; Mauro Zuliani; Roberto Ribaud	5th	3:05.10 F; 3:05.70 SF; 3:07.90 QF	
Marathon	Gianni Poli	7h	2:11:05	NR
Marathon	Marco Marchei	13th	2:11:47	
Marathon	Giampaolo Messina	DNF	NM	
20 km walk	Maurizio Damilano	7h	1:21:57	NR
20 km walk	Carlo Mattioli	18th	1:25:53	
20 km walk	Alessandro Pezzatini	24th	1:27:15	
50 km walk	Sandro Bellucci	7h	3:55:38	

Field events
Event	Athlete	Result	Performances	Notes
Long jump	Giovanni Evangelisti	Qual.	7.70 m	
Long jump	Marco Piochi	Qual.	7.52 m	
High jump	Luca Toso	10th	2.26 F; 2.21 m Q	
High jump	Gianni Davito	Qual.	2.10 m	
Shot put	Alessandro Andrei	7th	20.07 m F; 19.57 m Q	
Hammer throw	Giampaolo Urlando	Qual.	72.06 m	

=== Women (12) ===
Track and road events
Event	Athlete	Result	Performances	Notes
200 m	Marisa Masullo	Semi	23.36 SF; 23.58 QF; 23.37 Heat	
400 m	Erica Rossi	Quarter	53.88 QF; 53.51 Heat	
1500 m	Gabriella Dorio	7th	4:04.73 F; 4:09.75 SF	
3000 m	Agnese Possamai	6th	8:37.96 F; 8:46.68 SF	NR
400 m hs	Giuseppina Cirulli	Quarter	57.43	
4×100 m relay	(Italy) National Team; Carla Mercurio; Erica Rossi; Daniela Ferrian; Marisa Masullo	Semi	44.46	
Marathon	Laura Fogli	6h	2:33:31	
Marathon	Rita Marchisio	11th	2:35:08	
Marathon	Alba Milana	DNF	NM	

Field events
Event	Athlete	Result	Performances	Notes
High jump	Sara Simeoni	Qual.	1.84 m	
Javelin throw	Fausta Quintavalla	Qual.	59.34 m	
