= Italy at the 2013 World Championships in Athletics =

- WA code: ITA
- National federation: FIDAL
- Website: www.fidal.it

in Moscow
- Competitors: 48 (27 men, 21 women)
- Medals: Gold 0 Silver 1 Bronze 1 Total 2

World Championships in Athletics appearances (overview)
- 1976; 1980; 1983; 1987; 1991; 1993; 1995; 1997; 1999; 2001; 2003; 2005; 2007; 2009; 2011; 2013; 2015; 2017; 2019; 2022; 2023; 2025

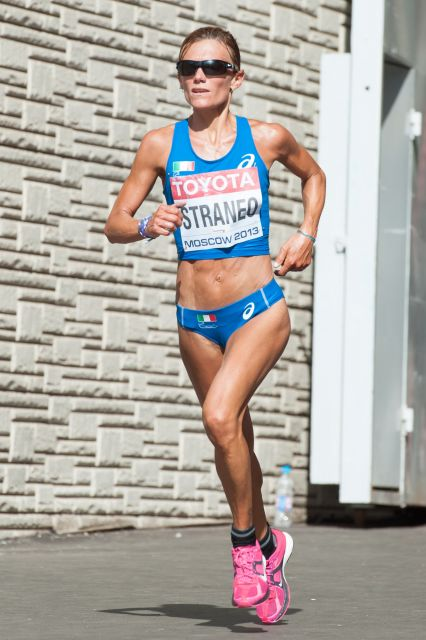
Valeria Straneo, first Italian medal at Moscow 2013.

Italy competed at the 2013 World Championships in Athletics from 10 to 18 August in Moscow, Russia. On 23 July 2013 the President of the FIDAL Alfio Giomi announced during the event which took place in Agosto Azzurro in the main hall of CONI that 59 Italian athletes would participate in the world championships in Moscow.

== Medalists ==
Athlete	Gendre	Event	Medal
Valeria Straneo	Women	Marathon	Silver
Elisa Rigaudo	Women	20 km walk	Bronze

== Finalists ==
Italy national athletics team ranked 19th (with seven finalists) in the IAAF placing table. Rank obtained by assigning eight points in the first place and so on to the eight finalists.

Rank	Country	1st place, gold medalist(s)	2nd place, silver medalist(s)	3rd place, bronze medalist(s)	4	5	6	7	8	Pts
19	Italy	0	1	1	0	0	1	2	2	22

Details

- Valeria Straneo, silver medal in the marathon
- Elisa Rigaudo, bronze medal in the 20 km walk
- Emma Quaglia, 6th in the marathon
- Alessia Trost, 7th in the high jump
- Nicola Vizzoni. 7th in the hammer throww
- Fabrizio Schembri, 8th in the triple jump
- Eleonora Giorgi, 8th in the 20 km walk
  - 4×400 metres relay female team, disqualified in final

== Team selection ==
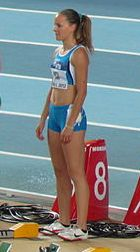
Veronica Borsi 12.76 in 100 m hs, new Italian record and standard A.

IAAF entry Standards, to be reach from 1 October 2012 to 29 July 2013 and from 1 January 2012 (10,000 m, Marathon, Race Walks, Relays and Combined Events). In the following list all the qualified athletes to individual level, will be considered also the members of the relay team.

=== Athletes who have achieved the standard A ===
Finalists (first eight positions)

==== Men (27) ====
Athlete	Event	Standard	Perf.	Venue	Date	Results	Perf.
Enrico Demonte	200 m	20.52	20.45	(Switzerland) La Chaux-de-Fonds	7 July	38th Quarter	21.13
Matteo Galvan	400 m	45.60	45.59	(Turkey) Mersin	28 June	16th Semi	45.69 SF; 45.39 QF PB
Giordano Benedetti	800 m	1:45.40	1:44.67	(Italy) Rome	6 June	20th Semi	1:48.31
Daniele Meucci	10,000 m	27:40.00	27:32.86	(United States) Palo Alto	29 April 2012	19th	28:06.74 SB
Patrick Nasti	3000 m st	8:32.00	8:30.28	(Germany) Dessau	31 May	33rd Semi	8:36.42
Jamel Chatbi	3000 m st	8:26.00	8:25.37	(Morocco) Rabat	9 June	Semi	DQ
Yuri Floriani	3000 m st	8:26.00	8:24.62	(Spain) Huelva	12 June	Semi	DQ
Silvano Chesani	High jump	2.31 m	2.33 m (i)	(Italy) Ancona	17 February	16th Qual.	2.26 m
Giuseppe Gibilisco	Pole vault	5.70 m	5.70 m	(Turkey) Mersin	28 June	Qual.	NM
Claudio Stecchi	Pole vault	5.60 m	5.60 m	(Italy) Rieti	5 July	28th Qual.	5.40 m
Fabrizio Donato	Triple jump	Qualified as Area Champion				15th Qual.	16.53 m
Fabrizio Schembri	Triple jump	16.85 m	16.85 m	(Italy) Rome	6 June	8th	16.74 m
Daniele Greco	Triple jump	17.20 m	17.70 m (i)	(Sweden) Gothenburg	2 March	Qual.	NM
Giovanni Faloci	Discus throw	64.00 m	64.77 m	(Italy) Tarquinia	4 June	27th Qual.	57.54 m
Nicola Vizzoni	Hammer throw	76.00 m	76.06 m	(Italy) Livorno	6 July	7th	77.81 m SB
Giorgio Rubino	20 km walk	1:24.00	1:20.19	(Switzerland) Lugano	18 March 2012	14th	1:25:45
Matteo Giupponi	20 km walk	1:24.00	1:20.58	(China) Taicang	20 March 2012	28th	1:23:27 SB
Federico Tontodonati	20 km walk	1:24.00	1:22.00	(Switzerland) Lugano	18 March 2012	43rd	1:29:26
Marco De Luca	50 km walk	4:02.00	3:47.19	(United Kingdom) London	11 August 2012	15th	3:48:05 SB
Jean-Jacques Nkouloukidi	50 km walk	4:02.00	3:56.32	(Slovakia) Dudince	19 May	24th	3:54:00 SB
Teodorico Caporaso	50 km walk	4:02.00	3:56.45	(Slovakia) Dudince	19 May	42nd	4:05:25
Michael Tumi; Matteo Galvan; Diego Marani; Delmas Obou	4 × 100 m relay					Semi	38.49 SB
Marco Lorenzi; Isalbet Juarez; Eusebio Haliti; Matteo Galvan	4 × 400 m relay					Semi	3:03.88 SB

==== Women (21) ====
Athlete	Event	Standard	Perf.	Venue	Date	Results	Perf.
Libania Grenot	400 m	51.55	51.53	(Italy) Lignano	16 July	9th Semi	50.47 SF; 51.43 QF SB
Chiara Bazzoni	400 m	52.35	52.06	(Turkey) Mersin	28 June	18th Semi	52.11 SF; 52.14 QF
Marta Milani	800 m	2.01.50	2.01.40	(Italy) Lignano	16 July	27th Quarter	2:02.41
Margherita Magnani	1500 metres	4:09.00	4:06.34	(Turkey) Mersin	26 June	28th Quarter	4:11.15
Marzia Caravelli	100 m hs	13.10	12.95	(Switzerland) Bellinzona	11 June	18th Semi	13.06 SF; 13.07 QF
Veronica Borsi	100 m hs	12.94	12.76	(Italy) Orvieto	2 June	29th Quarter	13.35
Jennifer Rockwell	400 m hs	56.55	55.70	(Switzerland) La Chaux-de-Fonds	7 July	19th Quarter	56.53
Alessia Trost	High jump	1.95 m	2.00 m (i)	(Czech Republic) Třinec	20 January	7th	1.93 m
Dariya Derkach	Long jump	6.65 m	6.67 m	(Italy) Rieti	15 June	22nd Qual.	6.16 m
Simona La Mantia	Triple jump	14.20 m	14.26 m (i)	(Sweden) Gothenburg	3 March	14th Qual.	13.80 m
Chiara Rosa	Shot put	18.30 m	18.37 m (i)	(Sweden) Gothenburg	3 March	22nd Qual.	17.18 m
Valeria Straneo	Marathon	2:30.00	2:23.44	(Netherlands) Rotterdam	15 April 2012	2nd	2:25:58 SB
Emma Quaglia	Marathon	2:30.00	2:28.15	(Italy) Turin	18 November 2012	6th	2:34:16 SB
Elisa Rigaudo	20 km walk	1:36.00	1:30.49	(Switzerland) Lugano	17 March	3rd	1:28:41
Eleonora Giorgi	20 km walk	1:36.00	1:32.09	(Slovakia) Dudince	19 May	8th	1:30:01 SB
Antonella Palmisano	20 km walk	1:36.00	1:32.36	(Czech Republic) Poděbrady	13 April	13th	1:30:50 PB
Audrey Alloh; Marzia Caravelli; Ilenia Draisci; Martina Amidei	4x100 m relay					Semi	44.05
Chiara Bazzoni; Marta Milani; Maria Enrica Spacca; Libania Grenot; Maria Benedicta Chigbolu	4x400 m relay					7th	DSQ F; 3:29.62 SF SB

=== Athletes not selected ===
Athletes who have achieved the standard B or standard A but they did not participate.

Women

(*): not selected.
(**): selected but renounces.

Athlete	Event	Standard	Performance	Venue	Date
Roberta Bruni**	Pole valt	4.60 m	4.60 m (i)	(Italy) Ancona	17 February
Ruggero Pertile*	Marathon	2:12.00	2:10.06	(Japan) Ōtsu	4 March 2012
Anna Incerti*	Marathon	2:30:00	2:29.38	(United Kingdom) London	5 August 2012
Michael Tumi*	100 metres	10.21	10.19	(Italy) Gavardo	19 May
Davide Manenti*	200 metres	20.60	20.60	(Italy) Rieti	1 June
Libania Grenot	200 metres	23.30	23.17	(Sint Maarten) Saint Martin	11 May
Nadia Ejjafini**	10,000 metres	32:05.00	31:45.14	(Spain) Bilbao	3 June 2012
Emanuele Abate*	110 metres hurdles	13.50	13.49	(United Kingdom) Gateshead	23 June
Micol Cattaneo	100 metres hurdles	13.10	13.02	(Italy) Lodi	11 May
Manuela Gentili**	400 metres hurdles	56.55	55.89	(Turkey) Mersin	27 June
Gianmarco Tamberi*	High Jump	2.28 m	2.30 m (i)	(Slovakia) Banská Bystrica	6 February
Silvia Salis**	Hammer Throw	69.50 m	69.69 m	(Germany) Halle	25 May

== See also ==
- Athletics in Italy
