= Italy at the 1997 World Championships in Athletics =

- WA code: ITA
- National federation: FIDAL
- Website: www.fidal.it

in Athens
- Competitors: 66 (40 men, 26 women)
- Medals Ranked 14th: Gold 1 Silver 1 Bronze 1 Total 3

World Championships in Athletics appearances (overview)
- 1976; 1980; 1983; 1987; 1991; 1993; 1995; 1997; 1999; 2001; 2003; 2005; 2007; 2009; 2011; 2013; 2015; 2017; 2019; 2022; 2023; 2025

Italy competed at the 1997 World Championships in Athletics in Athens, Greece from 1 to 10 August 1997.

== Medalists ==
Athlete	Gendre	Event	Medal
Annarita Sidoti	Women	10 Kilometres Race Walk	Gold
Roberta Brunet	Women	5000 metres	Silver
Fiona May	Women	Long Jump	Bronze

== Finalists ==
The largest team of the Italy national athletics team (66 competitors) of ever time at the World Championships, ranked 6th (with 16 finalists) in the IAAF placing table. Rank obtained by assigning eight points in the first place and so on to the eight finalists.

Rank	Country	1st place, gold medalist(s)	2nd place, silver medalist(s)	3rd place, bronze medalist(s)	4	5	6	7	8	Pts
9	Italy	1	1	1	2	2	0	4	5	52

== Results ==
Italy participated with 66 athletes by winning three medals.

Finalists (first eight positions)

=== Men (40) ===
Track and field events
Event	Athlete	Result	Performances	Notes
100 m	Stefano Tilli	Quarter	(6. nel 5qf with 10.36, n. in 4b with 10.25)	
200 m	Giovanni Puggioni	Quarter	(7. nel 4qf with 22.70, 1. in 5b with 20.73)	
200 m	Carlo Occhiena	Quarter	(8. nel 2qf with 21.14, 3. in 4b with 20.90)	
200 m	Alessandro Attene	Haat	(5. in 6b with 20.92)	
400 m	Marco Vaccari	Quarter	(7. nel 3qf with 46.32, 5. in 5b with 46.00)	
800 m	Andrea Longo	Quarter	(5. nel 4qf with 1:46.60, 3. in 2b with 1:46.79)	
800 m	Giuseppe D'Urso	DNF	in heat (ret. in 3b)	
1500 m	Gennaro Di Napoli	Semi	(8. in 2sf with 3:39.45, 5. in 4b with 3:37.50)	
10,000 m	Stefano Baldini	9th	with 28:11.97 (10. in b with 28:07.81)	
Marathon	Danilo Goffi	4th	with 2h14:47	
Marathon	Giacomo Leone	7th	with 2h17:16	
Marathon	Francesco Ingargiola	30.	with 2h23:30;	
Marathon	Marcello Curioni	DNF	NM	
Marathon	Vincenzo Modica	DNF	NM	
3000 m st	Angelo Carosi	8th	with 8:16.01 (4. in 2sf with 8:20.82, 4. in 3b with 8:29.92)	
3000 m st	Alessandro Lambruschini	Semi	(rit. in 1sf, 6. in 1b with 8:26.35)	
3000 m st	Giuseppe Maffei	Haat	(9. in 2b with 8:37.12)	
400 m hs	Fabrizio Mori	4th	with 48.05 (2. in 3sf with 48.17, 1. in 2b with 48.93)	
400 m hs	Ashraf Saber	Semi	(8. in 2sf with 49.36, 3. in 7b with 49.11)	
400 m hs	Laurent Ottoz	Haat	(4. in 5b with 49.69)	
Pole vault	Fabio Pizzolato	Qual.	with 5.60	
Pole vault	Andrea Giannini	Qual.	with 5.45	
Long jump	Paolo Camossi	Qual.	(n.m.)	
shot put	Paolo Dal Soglio	9th	with 19.77 (19.93 in qual.)	
shot put	Corrado Fantini	Qual.	with 19.30	
Discus throw	Diego Fortuna	Qual.	with 60.06	
Hammer throw	Enrico Sgrulletti	Qual.	with 74.70	
Hammer throw	Nicola Vizzoni	Qual.	with 73.42	
Hammer throw	Loris Paoluzzi	Qual.	with 71.50	
Decathlon	Beniamino Poserina	Ret.	NM	
20 km walk	Michele Didoni	7th	with 1h23:14	
20 km walk	Giovanni De Benedictis	8th	with 1h23:33	
20 km walk	Alessandro Gandellini	12th	with 1h24:24	
50 km walk	Arturo Di Mezza	8th	with 3h51:33	
50 km walk	Giovanni Perricelli	14th	with3h57:38	
50 km walk	Orazio Romanzi	28th	with 4h11:00	
4 × 100 m relay	(Italy) National Team; Andrea Amici; Giovanni Puggioni; Carlo Occhiena; Sandro Floris	Semi	(5. in 1sf with 38.77, 3. in 4b with 38.97)	
4 × 400 m relay	(Italy) National Team; Ashraf Saber; Marco Vaccari; Andrea Nuti; Fabrizio Mori	7th	with 3:01.52 (2. in 3b with 3:01.75)	

=== Women (26) ===
Track and field events
Event	Athlete	Result	Performances	Notes
100 m	Manuela Levorato	Haat	(4. in 3b with 11.57)	
100 m	Giada Gallina	Haat	(6. in 5b with 11.64)	
200 m	Danielle Perpoli	Haat	(6. in 1b with 23.96)	
400 m	Patrizia Spuri	Quarter	(8. nel 3qf with 52.15, 3. in 3b with 52.54)	
5000 m	Roberta Brunet	2nd	with 14:58.29 (4. in 1b with 15:29.03)	
10,000 m	Silvia Sommaggio	9th	with 32:16.92 (4. in 1b with 33:08.19)	
Marathon	Ornella Ferrara	5th	with 2h33:10	
Marathon	Franca Fiacconi	13th	with 2h39:53	
Marathon	Laura Fogli	24th	with 2h43:28	
Marathon	Anna Villani	27th	with 2h43:58	
Marathon	Sonia Maccioni	Ret.	NM	
100 m hs	Carla Tuzzi	Haat	(6. in 2b with 13.10)	
400 m hs	Carla Barbarino	Haat	(6. in 3b with 57.05)	
High jump	Antonella Bevilacqua	7th	with 1.93 (1.94 in qual.)	
Long jump	Fiona May	3rd	with 6.91 (6.73 in qual.)	
Triple jump	Barbara Lah	Qual.	with 13.70	
Triple jump	Antonella Capriotti	Qual.	with 13.32	
Shot put	Mara Rosolen	Qual.	with 17.87	
Discus throw	Agnese Maffeis	8th	with 61.40 (59.94 in qual.)	
10 km walk	Annarita Sidoti	1st	with 42:55.49 (7. in 1b with 44:19.33)	
10 km walk	Erica Alfridi	5th	with 43:59.73 (1. in 2b with 44:32.04)	
10 km walk	Elisabetta Perrone	10th	with 45:16.64 (2. in 2b with 44:32.06)	
4 × 100 m relay	(Italy) National Team; Elena Sordelli; Giada Gallina; Manuela Grillo; Manuela Levorato	Haat	(7. in 1b with 44.16)	
4 × 400 m relay	(Italy) National Team; Patrizia Spuri; Francesca Carbone; Carla Barbarino; Virna De Angeli; Danielle Perpoli	8th	with 3:30.63 (4. in 2b with 3:30.34)	
