= Italy at the 2007 World Championships in Athletics =

- WA code: ITA
- National federation: Federazione Italiana di Atletica Leggera

in Osaka
- Competitors: 33 (18 men and 15 women)
- Medals: Gold 0 Silver 2 Bronze 1 Total 3

World Championships in Athletics appearances (overview)
- 1976; 1980; 1983; 1987; 1991; 1993; 1995; 1997; 1999; 2001; 2003; 2005; 2007; 2009; 2011; 2013; 2015; 2017; 2019; 2022; 2023; 2025

Italy was represented by 36 athletes at the 2007 World Championships in Athletics.

Their 36-strong delegation was Italy's smallest since 1983. Andrew Howe (long jump), Antonietta Di Martino (high jump) and walkers such as Ivano Brugnetti and Alex Schwazer were the main medal hopes. Howe, Di Martino and Schwazer won Italy's two silver and bronze medals.

== Medalists ==
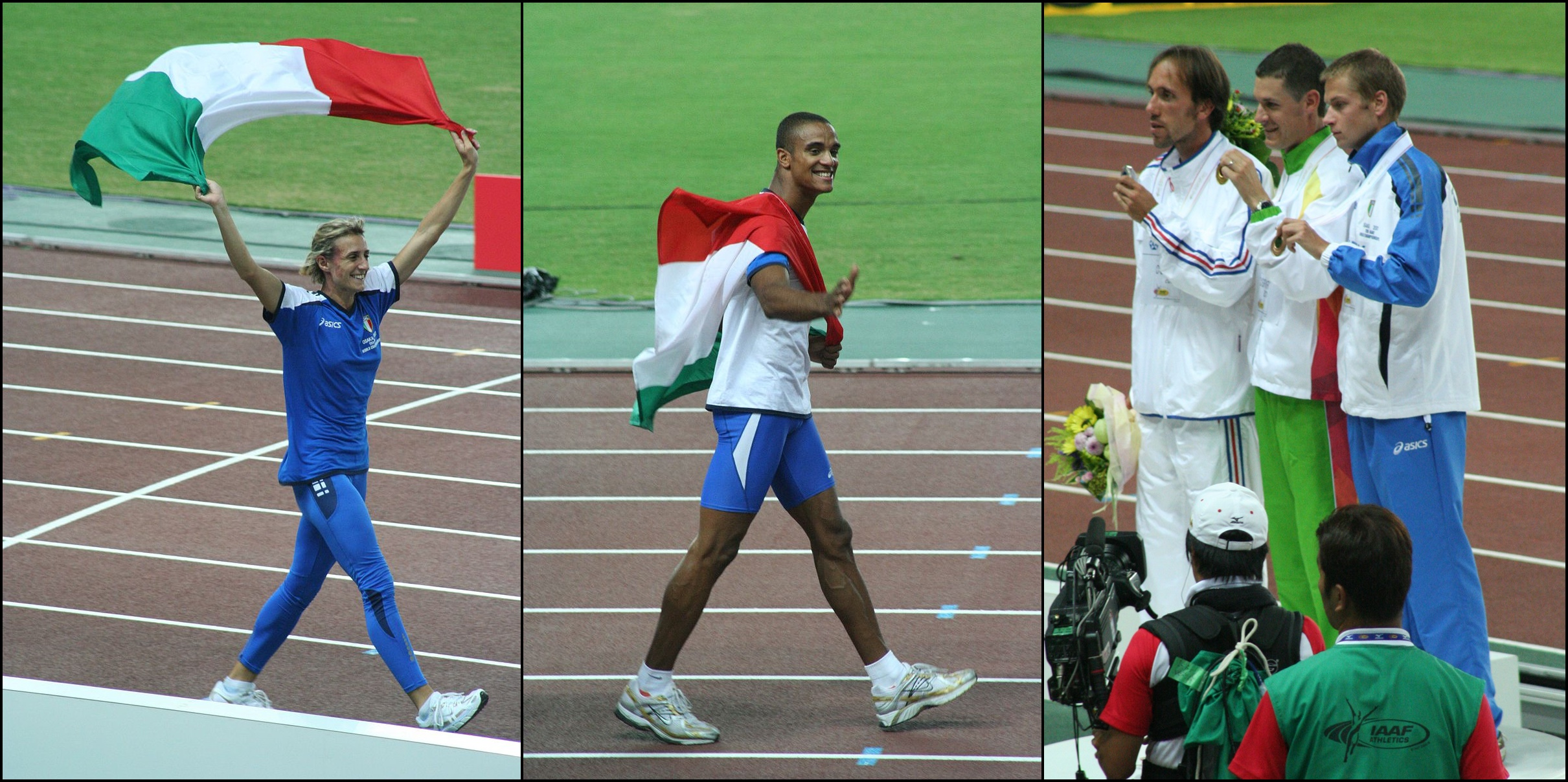
Italian medalists at 2007 World Athletics Championships, Antonietta Di Martino and Andrew Howe with the Italian flag while celebrating and Alex Schwazer on the podium (third from left).

| Athlete | Gendre | Event | Medal |
|---|---|---|---|
| Antonietta Di Martino | Women | High jump | SILVER |
| Andrew Howe | Men | Long jump | SILVER |
| Alex Schwazer | Men | 50 Kilometres Race walk | BRONZE |

== Finalists ==
Italy national athletics team ranked 6th (with 13 finalists) in the IAAF placing table. Rank obtained by assigning eight points in the first place and so on to the eight finalists.

| Rank | Country | 1st place, gold medalist(s) | 2nd place, silver medalist(s) | 3rd place, bronze medalist(s) | 4 | 5 | 6 | 7 | 8 | Pts |
|---|---|---|---|---|---|---|---|---|---|---|
| 6 | Italy | 0 | 2 | 1 | 0 | 2 | 0 | 1 | 1 | 31 |

== Results ==
Finalists (first eight positions)

=== Men (18) ===
Track and road events
| Event | Athlete | Result | Performances | Notes |
| 100 m | Simone Collio | Quarter | 10.31 QF; 10.22 Heat | |
| 100 m | Rosario La Mastra | Quarter | 10.32 QF; 10.27 Heat | PB |
| 400 m | Andrea Barberi | 33rd Quarter | 50.35 SF; 49.81 QF | SB |
| 1500 m | Christian Obrist | 17th Semi | 3:42.93 SF; 3:41.74 QF | |
| 400 m hs | Gianni Carabelli | 22nd Semi | 45.74 | |
| 4x100 m relay | (Italy) National Team; Rosario La Mastra; Simone Collio; Maurizio Checcucci; Jacques Riparelli | 10th Semi | 38.81 | |
| Marathon | Migidio Bourifa | DNF | NM | |
| 20 km walk | Giorgio Rubino | 5th | 1:24:39 | |
| 20 km walk | Alex Schwazer | 10th | 1:24:39 | SB |
| 20 km walk | Ivano Brugnetti | DQ | NM | |
| 50 km walk | Alex Schwazer | 3rd | 3:44:38 | |
| 50 km walk | Diego Cafagna | 18th | 4:06:03 | |
| 50 km walk | Marco De Luca | DNF | NM | |

Field events
| Event | Athlete | Result | Performances | Notes |
| Triple jump | Andrew Howe | 2nd | 8.47 m F; 8.17 m Q | NR |
| Triple jump | Fabrizio Donato | Qual. | 16.20 m | |
| High jump | Andrea Bettinelli | Qual. | 2.26 m | |
| High jump | Nicola Ciotti | Qual. | 2.26 m | |
| Discus throw | Hannes Kirchler | Qual. | 60.34 m | |
| Hammer throw | Nicola Vizzoni | Qual. | 73.64 m | |

=== Women (15) ===
Track and road events
| Event | Athlete | Result | Performances | Notes |
| 400 m | Daniela Reina | 21st Semi | 51.99 SF; 52.02 QF | SB |
| 800 m | Elisa Cusma | 10th Semi | 3:58.63 SF; 2:00.54 QF | PB |
| 5000 m | Silvia Weissteiner | 12th | 15:11.81 F; 15:15.74 SF | PB |
| 3000 m st | Elena Romagnolo | Semi | 9:50.79 | |
| Marathon | Anna Incerti | 17h | 2:36:36 | SB |
| Marathon | Deborah Toniolo | 26th | 2:39:46 | SB |
| Marathon | Lucilla Andreucci | 48th | 2:56:19 | |
| Marathon | Giovanna Volpato | DNF | NM | |
| Marathon Team | Italy | 5th | 8:12:41 | |
| 20 km walk | Elisa Rigaudo | DNF | NM | |

Field events
| Event | Athlete | Result | Performances | Notes |
| Triple jump | Magdelín Martínez | 5th | 14.71 m F; 14.62 Q | SB |
| High jump | Antonietta Di Martino | 2nd | 2.03 F; 1.94 m Q | NR |
| Shot put | Chiara Rosa | 8th | 18.39 m F; 18.77 m Q | |
| Shot put | Assunta Legnante | Qual. | 18.19 m | |
| Javelin throw | Zahra Bani | Qual. | 59.02 m | |
| Hammer throw | Clarissa Claretti | 7th | 70.74 m F; 69.53 Q | |
