= Lorenzo Vergani =

Italian hurdler

Personal information
- Nationality: Italian
- Born: 4 September 1993 (age 32) Milan

Sport
- Country: Italy
- Sport: Athletics
- Event: 400 metres hurdles
- Club: Pro Patria Milano

Achievements and titles
- Personal best: 400 m hs: 49.36 (2017)

Lorenzo Vergani (born 4 September 1993) is an Italian male 400 metres hurdler.

== Biography ==
Having obtained the IAAF qualification standard, on 27 July 2017 he was selected by Italy national athletics team's technical commissioner, Elio Locatelli, to participate in the 2017 World Championships in Athletics.

== See also ==
- Italian all-time lists - 400 metres hurdles
