= Italy at the 1987 World Championships in Athletics =

- WA code: ITA
- National federation: FIDAL
- Website: www.fidal.it

in Rome
- Competitors: 56 (35 men, 21 women)
- Medals Ranked 6th: Gold 2 Silver 2 Bronze 1 Total 5

World Championships in Athletics appearances (overview)
- 1976; 1980; 1983; 1987; 1991; 1993; 1995; 1997; 1999; 2001; 2003; 2005; 2007; 2009; 2011; 2013; 2015; 2017; 2019; 2022; 2023

Italy competed at the 1987 World Championships in Athletics in Rome, Italy from 7–14 August 1987.

== Medalists ==
Athlete	Gendre	Event	Medal
Francesco Panetta	Men	3000 Metres Steeplechase	Gold
Maurizio Damilano	Men	20 Kilometres Race Walk	Gold
Francesco Panetta	Men	10,000 Metres	Silver
Alessandro Andrei	Men	Shot Put	Silver
Gelindo Bordin	Men	Marathon	Bronze

== Finalists ==
Italy national athletics team ranked 6th (with 13 finalists) in the IAAF placing table. Rank obtained by assigning eight points in the first place and so on to the eight finalists.

Rank	Country	1st place, gold medalist(s)	2nd place, silver medalist(s)	3rd place, bronze medalist(s)	4	5	6	7	8	Pts
6	Italy	2	2	1	2	1	1	4	0	61

== Results ==
Finalists (first eight positions)

=== Men (35) ===
Track and road events
Event	Athlete	Result	Performances	Notes
100 m	Pierfrancesco Pavoni	7th	16.23 F; 10.33 SF; 10.28 QF; 10.24 Heat	
200 m	Pierfrancesco Pavoni	7th	20.45 F; 20.78 SF; 20.65 QF; 20.80 Heat	
200 m	Stefano Tilli	Semi	20.86 SF; 20.89 QF; 21.01 Heat	
400 m	Roberto Ribaud	Quarter	46.68 QF; 46.37 Heat	
10,000 m	Salvatore Antibo	16th	28:33.77	
10,000 m	Francesco Panetta	2nd	27:48.98	
3000 m st	Francesco Panetta	1st	8:08.57 F; 8:16.08 SF	CR; NR
3000 m st	Alessandro Lambruschini	9th	8:24.25 F; 8:21.21 SF	
3000 m st	Franco Boffi	13th	(8:43.60 F, 8:21.69 SF	
110 m hs	Gianni Tozzi	Quarter	13.87	
110 m hs	Luigi Bertocchi	Quarter	14.02	
400 m hs	Angelo Locci	Quarter	51.15	
4x100 m relay	(Italy) National Team; Ezio Madonia; Stefano Tilli; Paolo Catalano; Pierfrancesco Pavoni; Domenico Gorla	7th	39.62 F; 39.52 SF; 39.58 QF	
4x400 m relay	(Italy) National Team; Marcello Pantone; Vito Petrella; Andrea Montanari; Roberto Ribaud; Tiziano Gemelli	Semi	3:03.91 SF; 3:04.64 QF	
Marathon	Gelindo Bordin	3rd	2:12:40	
Marathon	Orlando Pizzolato	7th	2:14:03	
Marathon	Salvatore Bettiol	13th	2:17:45	
20 km walk	|Maurizio Damilano	1st	1:20.45	CR; SB
20 km walk	Carlo Mattioli	18th	1:22:53	
20 km walk	Walter Arena	DQ	NM	
50 km walk	Raffaello Ducceschi	4th	3:47.49	
50 km walk	Sandro Bellucci	6th	3:48.52	
50 km walk	Giacomo Poggi	DQ	NM	

Field events
Event	Athlete	Result	Performances	Notes
Long jump	Giovanni Evangelisti	4th	8.19 m F; 7.97 m Q	
Triple jump	Dario Badinelli	11th	16.63 m F; 16.64 m Q	
High jump	Luca Toso	Qual.	2.24 m	
Pole vault	Gianni Stecchi	11th	5.40 m F; 5.40 m Q	
Shot put	Alessandro Andrei	2nd	21.88 m F; 21.57 m Q	
Discus throw	Marco Martino	12th	60.60 m F; 62.26 m Q	
Javelin throw	Fabio De Gaspari	Qual.	70.76 m	
Hammer throw	Lucio Serrani	Qual.	74.00 m	
Decathlon	Marco Rossi	DNF	NM	

=== Women (21) ===
Track and road events
Event	Athlete	Result	Performances	Notes
100 m	Marisa Masullo	Quarter	11.62 QF; 11.71 Heat	
1500 m	Agnese Possamai	Semi	4:08.84	
3000 m	Agnese Possamai	Semi	8:57.85	
10,000 m	Maria Curatolo	Semi	NM	
10,000 m	Cristina Tomasini	Semi	NM	
100 m hs	Patrizia Lombardo	Semi	13.38 SF; 13.25 QF	
400 m hs	Irmgard Trojer	Semi	57.76 SF; 57.09 QF	
4x100 m relay	(Italy) National Team; Rita Angotzi; Patrizia Lombardo; Annarita Balzani; Marisa Masullo	Semi	44.49	
4x400 m relay	(Italy) National Team; Rossana Morabito; Cosetta Campana; Nevia Pistrino; Erica Rossi	Semi	3:31.72	
Marathon	Antonella Bizioli	12h	2:38:52	
Marathon	Emma Scaunich	20th	2:44.32	
Marathon	Rita Marchisio	DNF	NM	
10 km walk	Giuliana Salce	18h	47:28	
10 km walk	Maria Grazia Orsani	DNF	NM	

Field events
Event	Athlete	Result	Performances	Notes
Long jump	Antonella Capriotti	Qual.	6.31 m	
High jump	Alessandra Bonfiglioli	Qual.	1.85 m	
Discus throw	Maria Marello	Qual.	52.74 m	
Heptathlon	Alessandra Becatti	DNF	NM	
