= Italy at the 2025 World Athletics Championships =

- Flag of Italy
- WA code: ITA

in Tokyo, Japan 13 September 2025 – 21 September 2025
- Competitors: 88 (43 men and 45 women)
- Medals Ranked 11th: Gold 1 Silver 3 Bronze 3 Total 7

World Athletics Championships appearances (overview)
- 1976; 1980; 1983; 1987; 1991; 1993; 1995; 1997; 1999; 2001; 2003; 2005; 2007; 2009; 2011; 2013; 2015; 2017; 2019; 2022; 2023; 2025

Italy competed at the 2025 World Athletics Championships in Tokyo, Japan, from 13 to 21 September 2025.

== Medallists ==
Medal	Athlete	Event	Date
Gold	Mattia Furlani	Men's long jump	17 September
Silver	Antonella Palmisano	Women's 35 kilometres walk	13 September
Silver	Nadia Battocletti	Women's 10,000 metres	13 September
Silver	Andrea Dallavalle	Men's triple jump	19 September
Bronze	Leonardo Fabbri	Men's shot put	13 September
Bronze	Iliass Aouani	Men's marathon	15 September
Bronze	Nadia Battocletti	Women's 5000 metres	20 September

== Results ==
Italy entered 88 athletes to the championships: 45 women and 43 men.

Key

- Q = Qualified for the next round
- q = Qualified for the next round as a fastest loser or, in field events, by position without achieving the qualifying target
- NR = National record
- PB = Personal best
- SB = Season best
- N/A = Round not applicable for the event

=== Men ===
Track and road events

Athlete	Event	Heat		Semifinal		Final	
Athlete	Event	Result	Rank	Result	Rank	Result	Rank
Lamont Marcell Jacobs	100 metres	10.20 SB	3 Q	10.16 SB	6	Did not advance	
Eseosa Fostine Desalu	200 metres	20.43	5	Did not advance			
Filippo Tortu	200 metres	20.49	5	Did not advance			
Edoardo Scotti	400 metres	44.45 NR	3 Q	44.77	5	Did not advance	
Luca Sito	400 metres	46.22	7	Did not advance			
Giovanni Lazzaro	800 metres	1:47.00	8	Did not advance			
Francesco Pernici	800 metres	1:45.11	2 Q	1:43.84 PB	4	Did not advance	
Catalin Tecuceanu	800 metres	1:46.22	6	Did not advance			
Pietro Arese	1500 metres	3:40.91	1 Q	3:36.83 SB	12	Did not advance	
Joao Bussotti Neves	1500 metres	3:38.38	9	Did not advance			
Federico Riva	1500 metres	3:36.28	4 Q	4:14.31	11 qJ	3:35.33	7
Iliass Aouani	Marathon	—N/a				2:09:53	3rd place, bronze medalist(s)
Yohanes Chiappinelli	Marathon	—N/a				2:10:15 SB	6
Yemaneberhan Crippa	Marathon	—N/a				DNF	
Lorenzo Ndele Simonelli	110 metres hurdles	13.25	3 Q	13.22	4	Did not advance	
Alessandro Sibilio	400 metres hurdles	Did not finish		Did not advance			
Ala Zoghlami	3000 metres steeplechase	8:32.65	7	—N/a		Did not advance	
Fausto Desalu; Lamont Marcell Jacobs; Matteo Melluzzo; Lorenzo Patta	4 × 100 metres relay	38.52	6	—N/a		Did not advance	
Andrea Cosi	20 kilometres walk	—N/a				1:24:18	36
Francesco Fortunato	20 kilometres walk	—N/a				1:21:00	16
Gianluca Picchiottino	20 kilometres walk	—N/a				1:23:50	34
Teodorico Caporaso	35 kilometres walk	—N/a				DQ	
Matteo Giupponi	35 kilometres walk	—N/a				DNF	
Riccardo Orsoni	35 kilometres walk	—N/a				2:31:39	8

Field events

Athlete	Event	Qualification		Final	
Athlete	Event	Distance	Position	Distance	Position
Manuel Lando	High jump	2.16	22	Did not advance	
Matteo Sioli	High jump	2.25	9 q	2.24	8
Stefano Sottile	High jump	2.16	22	Did not advance	
Gianmarco Tamberi	High jump	2.16	22	Did not advance	
Simone Bertelli	Pole vault	5.55	21	Did not advance	
Matteo Oliveri	Pole vault	NM		Did not advance	
Mattia Furlani	Long jump	8.07	9 q	8.39 PB	1st place, gold medalist(s)
Andrea Dallavalle	Triple jump	17.08	4 q	17.64 PB	2nd place, silver medalist(s)
Andy Díaz Hernández	Triple jump	16.94	7 q	17.19	6
Leonardo Fabbri	Shot put	20.95	6 q	21.94	3rd place, bronze medalist(s)
Nick Ponzio	Shot put	20.34	14	Did not advance	
Zane Weir	Shot put	19.89	19	Did not advance	
Giorgio Olivieri	Hammer throw	71.41	32	Did not advance	

=== Women ===
Track and road events

Athlete	Event	Heat		Semifinal		Final	
Athlete	Event	Result	Rank	Result	Rank	Result	Rank
Zaynab Dosso	100 metres	11.10	1 Q	11.22	6	Did not advance	
Vittoria Fontana	200 metres	23.31	8	Did not advance			
Dalia Kaddari	200 metres	23.11	5	Did not advance			
Alice Mangione	400 metres	51.70	6	Did not advance			
Anna Polinari	400 metres	51.55	5	Did not advance			
Elena Bellò	800 metres	2:02.14	6	Did not advance			
Eloisa Coiro	800 metres	2:01.86	3 Q	1:59.19	3	Did not advance	
Ludovica Cavalli	1500 metres	4:09.91	12	Did not advance			
Gaia Sabbatini	1500 metres	4:04.93	3 Q	4:12.93	11	Did not advance	
Marta Zenoni	1500 metres	4:02.77	4 Q	DQ		Did not advance	
Nadia Battocletti	5000 metres	14:46.36	2 Q	—N/a		14:55.42	3rd place, bronze medalist(s)
Federica Del Buono	5000 metres	15:08.48 SB	12	—N/a		Did not advance	
Micol Majori	5000 metres	15:14.66	16	—N/a		Did not advance	
Nadia Battocletti	10,000 metres	—N/a				30:38.23 NR	2nd place, silver medalist(s)
Elisa Palmero	10,000 metres	—N/a				32:12.72	20
Rebecca Lonedo	Marathon	—N/a				2:33:40	20
Giada Carmassi	100 metres hurdles	12.83	2 Q	12.95	5	Did not advance	
Elena Carraro	100 metres hurdles	12.86	3 Q	12.79 PB	5	Did not advance	
Ayomide Folorunso	400 metres hurdles	54.67	2 Q	54.37	4	Did not advance	
Alice Muraro	400 metres hurdles	54.36 PB	1 Q	54.50	5	Did not advance	
Rebecca Sartori	400 metres hurdles	55.11	4 Q	55.34	8	Did not advance	
Vittoria Fontana; Gloria Hooper; Dalia Kaddari; Alessia Pavese	4 × 100 metres relay	49.41	6	—N/a		Did not advance	
Alessandra Bonora*; Eloisa Coiro; Alice Mangione; Anna Polinari; Virginia Troiani	4 × 400 metres relay	3:24.71 SB	4 q	—N/a		3:25.00	8
Federica Curiazzi	20 kilometres walk	—N/a				1:29:48	17
Alexandrina Mihai	20 kilometres walk	—N/a				1:29:44	15
Antonella Palmisano	20 kilometres walk	—N/a				Did not finish	
Nicole Colombi	35 kilometres walk	—N/a				2:51:04	11
Eleonora Anna Giorgi	35 kilometres walk	—N/a				2:58:50	17
Antonella Palmisano	35 kilometres walk	—N/a				2:42:24	2nd place, silver medalist(s)

Field events

Athlete	Event	Qualification		Final	
Athlete	Event	Distance	Position	Distance	Position
Idea Pieroni	High jump	1.83	28	Did not advance	
Asia Tavernini	High jump	1.83	28	Did not advance	
Roberta Bruni	Pole vault	4.60	7 q	4.45	11
Elisa Molinarolo	Pole vault	4.45	20	Did not advance	
Larissa Iapichino	Long jump	6.56	15	Did not advance	
Dariya Derkach	Triple jump	13.69 SB	22	Did not advance	
Erika Saraceni	Triple jump	13.82	17	Did not advance	
Daisy Osakue	Discus throw	58.56	24	Did not advance	
Sara Fantini	Hammer throw	71.06	10 q	73.06 SB	7

Combined events – Heptathlon

Athlete	Event	100H	HJ	SP	200 m	LJ	JT	800 m	Final	Rank
Sveva Gerevini	Result	13.52	1.74 m	12.98 m	24.07	5.80 m	44.16 m	2:08.89	6167 SB	13
Sveva Gerevini	Points	1047	903	726	974	789	747	981	6167 SB	13

=== Mixed ===
Athlete	Event	Heat		Final	
Athlete	Event	Result	Rank	Result	Rank
Vladimir Aceti (M); Alice Mangione (W); Anna Polinari (W); Luca Sito (M); Edoardo Scotti* (M)	4 × 400 metres relay	3:11.20	4 q	3:15.82	7
