= Italy at the 2023 World Athletics Championships =

- Flag of Italy
- WA code: ITA

in Budapest, Hungary 19 August 2023 – 27 August 2023
- Competitors: 78 (43 men and 35 women)
- Medals Ranked 13th: Gold 1 Silver 2 Bronze 1 Total 4

World Athletics Championships appearances (overview)
- 1976; 1980; 1983; 1987; 1991; 1993; 1995; 1997; 1999; 2001; 2003; 2005; 2007; 2009; 2011; 2013; 2015; 2017; 2019; 2022; 2023; 2025

Italy competed at the 2023 World Athletics Championships in Budapest, Hungary, from 19 to 27 August 2023.

== Medalists ==
Medal	Athlete	Event	Date
Gold	Gianmarco Tamberi	Men's high jump	August 22
Silver	Leonardo Fabbri	Men's shot put	August 19
Silver	Roberto Rigali; Marcell Jacobs; Lorenzo Patta; Filippo Tortu	Men's 4 × 100 metres relay	August 26
Bronze	Antonella Palmisano	Women's 20 kilometres walk	August 20

== Results ==
Italy entered 78 athletes.

Key

- Q = Qualified for the next round
- q = Qualified for the next round as a fastest loser or, in field events, by position without achieving the qualifying target
- NR = National record
- PB = Personal best
- SB = Season best
- N/A = Round not applicable for the event

=== Men ===
Track and road events

Athlete	Event	Heat		Semifinal		Final	
Athlete	Event	Result	Rank	Result	Rank	Result	Rank
Samuele Ceccarelli	100 metres	10.26	4	Did not advance			
Marcell Jacobs	100 metres	10.15 SB	3 Q	10.05 SB	5	Did not advance	
Fausto Desalu	200 metres	20.49 SB	6	Did not advance			
Filippo Tortu	200 metres	20.46	4	Did not advance			
Davide Re	400 metres	45.07 SB	4 q	45.29	4	Did not advance	
Simone Barontini	800 metres	1:45.21	2 Q	1:44.34 PB	5	Did not advance	
Francesco Pernici	800 metres	1:45.89	4	Did not advance			
Catalin Tecuceanu	800 metres	1:45.31	3 Q	1:44.79 PB	4	Did not advance	
Pietro Arese	1500 metres	3:34.48	4 Q	3:33.11 PB	8	Did not advance	
Joao Bussotti	1500 metres	3:48.55	13	Did not advance			
Ossama Meslek	1500 metres	3:35.12	7	Did not advance			
Yemaneberhan Crippa	10,000 metres	—N/a				28:16.40	12
Yohanes Chiappinelli	Marathon	—N/a				2:11:12	11
Eyob Faniel	Marathon	—N/a				DNF	
Daniele Meucci	Marathon	—N/a				2:11:06 SB	10
Hassane Fofana	110 metres hurdles	13.53	4 Q	13.50	7	Did not advance	
Lorenzo Simonelli	110 metres hurdles	13.50	4 Q	13.69	8	Did not advance	
Mario Lambrughi	400 metres hurdles	49.05 SB	6 q	DQ		Did not advance	
Alessandro Sibilio	400 metres hurdles	49.50	4 Q	48.43	5	Did not advance	
Ala Zoghlami	3000 metres steeplechase	8:28.76	10	—N/a		Did not advance	
Osama Zoghlami	3000 metres steeplechase	8:33.07	9	—N/a		Did not advance	
Andrea Cosi	20 kilometres walk	—N/a				1:23:28	30
Francesco Fortunato	20 kilometres walk	—N/a				1:19:01	11
Massimo Stano	20 kilometres walk	—N/a				DNF	
Andrea Agrusti	35 kilometres walk	—N/a				2:30:32	15
Matteo Giupponi	35 kilometres walk	—N/a				2:34:58 SB	20
Riccardo Orsoni	35 kilometres walk	—N/a				2:31:41	16
Massimo Stano	35 kilometres walk	—N/a				2:25:59 SB	7
Marcell Jacobs; Lorenzo Patta; Roberto Rigali; Filippo Tortu	4 × 100 metres relay	37.65 WL	1 Q	—N/a		37.62 SB	2nd place, silver medalist(s)
Lorenzo Benati; Riccardo Meli; Davide Re; Edoardo Scotti; Alessandro Sibilio*	4 × 400 metres relay	3:00.14 SB	3 Q	—N/a		3:01.23	7

Field events

Athlete	Event	Qualification		Final	
Athlete	Event	Distance	Position	Distance	Position
Marco Fassinotti	High jump	2.28 SB	6 q	2.20	12
Stefano Sottile	High jump	2.22	26	Did not advance	
Gianmarco Tamberi	High jump	2.28	9 q	2.36 =WL	1st place, gold medalist(s)
Claudio Stecchi	Pole vault	5.75	12 q	5.75	=9
Mattia Furlani	Long jump	7.85	18	Did not advance	
Tobia Bocchi	Triple jump	16.66	13	Did not advance	
Emmanuel Ihemeje	Triple jump	16.91	7 q	16.91	8
Leonardo Fabbri	Shot put	20.74	12 q	22.34 PB	2nd place, silver medalist(s)
Zane Weir	Shot put	21.82	2 Q	19.99	11

=== Women ===
Track and road events

Athlete	Event	Heat		Semifinal		Final	
Athlete	Event	Result	Rank	Result	Rank	Result	Rank
Zaynab Dosso	100 metres	11.14 =NR	3 Q	11.19	7	Did not advance	
Dalia Kaddari	200 metres	22.67 SB	4 q	22.75	6	Did not advance	
Alice Mangione	400 metres	51.57	6	Did not advance			
Elena Bellò	800 metres	2:01.38	5	Did not advance			
Eloisa Coiro	800 metres	2:00.36	5 q	1:59.61 PB	6	Did not advance	
Ludovica Cavalli	1500 metres	4:03.81	6 Q	4:02.83 PB	6 Q	4:01.84 PB	11
Gaia Sabbatini	1500 metres	4:03.04	4 Q	DNF		Did not advance	
Sintayehu Vissa	1500 metres	4:01.66 PB	7	Did not advance			
Nadia Battocletti	5000 metres	14:41.78	7 Q	—N/a		15:27.86	16
Ludovica Cavalli	5000 metres	15:32.95	17	—N/a		Did not advance	
Giovanna Epis	Marathon	—N/a				2:29:10	12
Ayomide Folorunso	400 metres hurdles	54.30	3 Q	53.89 NR	4 q	54.19	6
Eleonora Marchiando	400 metres hurdles	56.27	6	Did not advance			
Rebecca Sartori	400 metres hurdles	54.82 PB	5 q	55.98	8	Did not advance	
Eleonora Giorgi	20 kilometres walk	—N/a				1:31:45	20
Antonella Palmisano	20 kilometres walk	—N/a				1:27:26 SB	3rd place, bronze medalist(s)
Valentina Trapletti	20 kilometres walk	—N/a				1:32:57	22
Nicole Colombi	35 kilometres walk	—N/a				3:02:29	27
Federica Curiazzi	35 kilometres walk	—N/a				2:53:27	15
Sara Vitiello	35 kilometres walk	—N/a				2:57:00	19
Anna Bongiorni; Zaynab Dosso; Dalia Kaddari; Alessia Pavese	4 × 100 metres relay	42.14 NR	3 Q	—N/a		42.49	4
Alessandra Bonora; Alice Mangione; Anna Polinari; Giancarla Trevisan; Ayomide Folorunso*	4 × 400 metres relay	3:23.86 NR	3 Q	—N/a		3:24.98	7

Field events

Athlete	Event	Qualification		Final	
Athlete	Event	Distance	Position	Distance	Position
Roberta Bruni	Pole vault	4.35	29	Did not advance	
Elisa Molinarolo	Pole vault	4.65 PB	10 Q	4.50	=9
Larissa Iapichino	Long jump	6.73	6 q	6.82	5
Ottavia Cestonaro	Triple jump	14.20 SB	9 q	14.05	10
Dariya Derkach	Triple jump	14.15	10 q	14.36 SB	8
Daisy Osakue	Discus throw	61.31	12 q	61.13	12
Sara Fantini	Hammer throw	73.28 SB	6 Q	73.85 SB	6

=== Mixed ===
Track events

Athlete	Event	Heat		Final	
Athlete	Event	Result	Rank	Result	Rank
Lorenzo Benati; Ayomide Folorunso; Riccardo Meli; Alice Mangione	4 × 400 metres relay	3:14.56	13	Did not advance	
