= Martti Järvinen =

Finnish footballer (born 1933)

Personal information
- Date of birth: 21 September 1933 (age 93)

International career
Years	Team	Apps	(Gls)
1955–1957	Finland	2	(0)

Martti Järvinen (born 21 September 1933) is a Finnish footballer. He played in two matches for the Finland national football team from 1955 to 1957.
