= Elio Locatelli =

Italian speed skater (1943–2019)

Personal information
- Nationality: Italian
- Born: 15 April 1943 Canale d'Alba
- Died: 27 November 2019 (aged 76) Monaco

Sport
- Country: Italy
- Sport: Speed skating
- Event: Sprint

Elio Locatelli (15 April 1943 – 27 November 2019) was an Italian speed skater and technic commissioner (exactly direttore tecnico dell'alto livello in Italian language) of the Italy national athletics team.

== Biography ==
Before becoming a sports manager, in his sports career, he participated in two editions of the Winter Olympics. He had been in charge of the women's sector from 1987 to 1988 and was the only manager (men and women) from 1989 to 1994. He was back in the lead of the Italian national athletics team after 23 years, at no younger age of 74.

== Achievements ==
Year	Competition	Venue	Event	Position	Time	Notes
1964	Olympic Games	(Austria) Innsbruck	500 metres	31st	43.1	
1964	Olympic Games	(Austria) Innsbruck	1500 metres	35th	2:19.0	
1968	Olympic Games	(France) Grenoble	500 metres	26th	42.1	
1968	Olympic Games	(France) Grenoble	1500 metres	33rd	2:13.3	

== See also ==
- Technic commissioners of FIDAL
