= Italian Athletics Federation =

Governing body for athletics in Italy

- Federazione Italiana di Atletica Leggera
- Sport: Athletics
- Jurisdiction: Italy
- Abbreviation: FIDAL
- Founded: 21 October 1906
- Affiliation: World Athletics
- Affiliation date: 1913
- Regional affiliation: European Athletics
- Headquarters: Rome
- President: Stefano Mei

Official website
- www.fidal.it
- (Italy)

The Italian Athletics Federation (Italian: Federazione Italiana di Atletica Leggera, FIDAL), is the governing body for athletics in Italy since 1906.

The Italian Federation, founded on 21 October 1906, on initiative of La Gazzetta dello Sport, as Federazione Podistica Italiana (FPI), has been recognised by International Amateur Athletic Federation (IAAF), now World Athletics, since its Berlin Congress in 1913.

== History ==
FIDAL assumed its current name in 1926, previously it was as described in the following table.

Date	Initials	Full name	English translation	Notes
4 August 1897	UPT	Unione Podistica Torinese	Turinese Running Union	
1 April 1899	UPI	Unione Podistica Italiana, then Federazione Podistica Italiana on 21 October 1906	Italian Running Union	
8 October 1909	FISA	Federazione Italiana Sports Atletici	Italian Athletic Sports Federation	
12 December 1926	FIDAL	Federazione Italiana di Atletica Leggera	Italian Athletics Federation	

== Presidents ==
Election	Assembly	President
1926-1927		Alberto Buriani
1927-1929		Leandro Arpinati
1929-1930		Augusto Turati
1930-1943		Luigi Ridolfi
1943		Gaetano Simoni
1944		Gaetano Simoni
1944		Virgilio Tommasi
1945		Angelo Vigani
18.2.1946	Assembly of Florence	Bruno Zauli
10.3.1957	Assembly of Milan	Luigi Ridolfi
31.5.1958	Vice president	Gaetano Simoni
22.2.1959	Assembly of Trento	Gaetano Simoni
5.3.1961	Assembly of Ischia	Giosuè Poli
8.4.1969	Vice president	Vittorio Brunori
7.12.1969	Assembly of Rome	Primo Nebiolo
8.2.1989	Vice president	Adriano Rossi
23.4.1989	Assembly of Florence	Gianni Gola
29.11.1992	Assembly of Isernia	Gianni Gola
20.11.1994	Assembly of Rome	Gianni Gola
17.11.1996	Assembly of Rimini	Gianni Gola
8.12.1998	Assembly of Ferrara	Gianni Gola
28.1.2001	Assembly of Chianciano Terme	Gianni Gola
27.11.2004	Assembly of Chianciano Terme	Franco Arese
23.11.2008	Assembly of Turin	Franco Arese
2.12.2012	Assembly of Milan	Alfio Giomi
31.1.2021	Assembly of Rome	Stefano Mei
8.9.2024	Assembly of Fiuggi	Stefano Mei

== Technical Directors ==
Since 1920 the technical directors of the Italian national team have been the following.

Period	Men	Women	Only
1920	Platt Adams		
1921-1923		Matilde Candiani	
1924	Emilio Lunghi	Anita Podestà Vivarelli	
1925-1926	Massimo Cartasegna		
1927-1928	Jeno Gaspar		
1932	Adolfo Contoli		
1929-1935		Marina Zanetti	
1933-1934	Ove Andersen; Martti Jarvinen; Paavo Karikko; Veikko Renko		
1935-1939			Boyd Comstock
1946-1947		Lidia Bongiovanni	
1946-1961	Giorgio Oberweger		
1962-1963	Lauro Bononcini	Augusto Lorenzoni	
1964-1968			Giorgio Oberweger
1969	Sandro Calvesi	Marcello Pagani	
1970			Marcello Pagani
1971-1974			Bruno Cacchi
1975-1986	Enzo Rossi	Sandro Giovannelli	
1987-1988	Enzo Rossi	Elio Locatelli	
1989-1994			Elio Locatelli
1995-2000	Giampaolo Lenzi	Dino Ponchio	
2001-2004	Roberto Frinolli	Augusto D'Agostino	
2005-2007			Nicola Silvaggi
2008-2012			Franceco Uguagliati
2013-2016			Massimo Magnani
2017-2018			Elio Locatelli
2019–present			Antonio La Torre

== See also ==
- Italy national athletics team
- Athletics in Italy
- FIDAL Hall of Fame
- Naturalized athletes of Italy
