= 1993 IAAF World Race Walking Cup =

- Organisers: IAAF
- Edition: 16th
- Date: April 24–25
- Host city: Monterrey, Nuevo León, Mexico
- Events: 3
- Participation: 303 athletes from 36 nations

The 1993 IAAF World Race Walking Cup was held on 24 and 25 April 1993 in the streets of Monterrey, Mexico. The event was also known as IAAF/Reebok World Race Walking Cup. For the first time, event specific team standings were introduced for the men's 20 km and 50 km competitions.

Complete results were published.

== Medallists ==
Event	Gold		Silver		Bronze	
Men
Men's 20 km walk	Daniel García; Mexico	1:24:26	Valentí Massana; Spain	1:24:32	Alberto Cruz; Mexico	1:24:37
Men's 50 km walk	Carlos Mercenario; Mexico	3:50:28	Jesús Ángel García; Spain	3:52:44	Germán Sánchez; Mexico	3:54:15
Team (Men)
Lugano Cup (team men overall)	Mexico	540 pts	Spain	491 pts	Italy	487 pts
Team (Men 20 km)	Mexico	265 pts	Italy	244 pts	Spain	240 pts
Team (Men 50 km)	Mexico	275 pts	Spain	251 pts	France	245 pts
Women
Women's 10 km walk	Wang Yan; China	45:10	Sari Essayah; Finland	45:18	Yelena Nikolayeva; Russia	45:22
Team (women)
Eschborn Cup (Women 10 km)	Italy	196 pts	China	193 pts	Russia	193 pts

== Results ==
=== Men's 20 km ===
Place	Athlete	Nation	Time	Notes
1st place, gold medalist(s)	Daniel García	Mexico (MEX)	1:24:26	
2nd place, silver medalist(s)	Valentí Massana	Spain (ESP)	1:24:32	
3rd place, bronze medalist(s)	Alberto Cruz	Mexico (MEX)	1:24:37	
4	Robert Korzeniowski	Poland (POL)	1:24:47	
5	Mikhail Shchennikov	Russia (RUS)	1:24:49	
6	Daniel Plaza	Spain (ESP)	1:24:52	
7	Giovanni De Benedictis	Italy (ITA)	1:25:09	
8	Robert Ihly	Germany (GER)	1:25:32	
9	Igor Kollár	Slovakia (SVK)	1:26:00	
10	Giovanni Perricelli	Italy (ITA)	1:26:17	
11	Vladimir Andreyev	Russia (RUS)	1:26:26	
12	Li Mingcai	China (CHN)	1:26:26	
13	Nicholas A'Hern	Australia (AUS)	1:27:11	
14	Ignacio Zamudio	Mexico (MEX)	1:27:24	
15	Clodomiro Moreno	Colombia (COL)	1:27:33	
16	Magnus Morenius	Sweden (SWE)	1:27:42	
17	Orlando Díaz	Colombia (COL)	1:28:05	
18	Jacek Müller	Poland (POL)	1:28:09	
19	Denis Langlois	France (FRA)	1:28:11	
20	Chen Shaoguo	China (CHN)	1:28:31	
21	Walter Arena	Italy (ITA)	1:28:39	
22	Yevgeniy Misyulya	Belarus (BLR)	1:28:39	
23	Arturo Di Mezza	Italy (ITA)	1:28:41	
24	Sergio Galdino	Brazil (BRA)	1:29:02	
25	Ademar Kammler	Brazil (BRA)	1:29:02	
26	Querubín Moreno	Colombia (COL)	1:29:05	
27	Pavol Blažek	Slovakia (SVK)	1:29:18	
28	Jean-Olivier Brosseau	France (FRA)	1:29:20	
29	José Juan Sánchez	Mexico (MEX)	1:29:36	
30	Martial Fesselier	France (FRA)	1:29:46	
31	Bo Lingtang	China (CHN)	1:29:48	
32	Sándor Urbanik	Hungary (HUN)	1:30:02	
33	Zbigniew Sadlej	Poland (POL)	1:30:24	
34	Steven Beecroft	Australia (AUS)	1:30:31	
35	Janusz Goławski	Poland (POL)	1:30:49	
36	Ruben Arikado	Mexico (MEX)	1:30:57	
37	Chris Maddocks	Great Britain (GBR)	1:31:04	
38	Christophe Cousin	France (FRA)	1:31:18	
39	Fernando Vázquez	Spain (ESP)	1:31:21	
40	Dimitriy Golos	Belarus (BLR)	1:31:25	
41	Jonathan Matthews	United States (USA)	1:31:28	
42	Peter Gabris	Slovakia (SVK)	1:31:34	
43	Christian Couturier	France (FRA)	1:31:39	
44	Chris Britz	South Africa (RSA)	1:31:51	
45	Markus Pauly	Germany (GER)	1:31:55	
46	Andrew Penn	Great Britain (GBR)	1:31:57	
47	Allen James	United States (USA)	1:32:24	
48	Grzegorz Müller	Poland (POL)	1:32:26	
49	Ralf Weise	Germany (GER)	1:32:34	
50	Steve Partington	Great Britain (GBR)	1:32:45	
51	Jan Olsson	Sweden (SWE)	1:32:58	
52	Mao Xinyuan	China (CHN)	1:33:45	
53	Rafael Martín	Spain (ESP)	1:33:45	
54	Nikolay Matyukhin	Russia (RUS)	1:34:05	
55	Gyula Dudás	Hungary (HUN)	1:34:36	
56	Martin St. Pierre	Canada (CAN)	1:34:51	
57	Peter Zanner	Germany (GER)	1:35:01	
58	Mark Donahoo	Australia (AUS)	1:35:06	
59	Dave McGovern	United States (USA)	1:35:25	
60	Pauli Pirjetä	Finland (FIN)	1:35:46	
61	Darrell Stone	Great Britain (GBR)	1:35:57	
62	Roman Mrázek	Slovakia (SVK)	1:36:12	
63	Igor Pasteruk	Ukraine (UKR)	1:36:16	
64	Sergio Spagnulo	Italy (ITA)	1:36:29	
65	Ian Whatley	United States (USA)	1:36:53	
66	Franz Kostyukevich	Belarus (BLR)	1:36:58	
67	Riecus Blignaut	South Africa (RSA)	1:36:59	
68	Vyacheslav Cherepanov	Russia (RUS)	1:37:06	
69	Artur Shumak	Belarus (BLR)	1:37:15	
70	Vladimir Druchik	Ukraine (UKR)	1:37:26	
71	Scott Nelson	New Zealand (NZL)	1:37:36	
72	Aldo Bertoldi	Switzerland (SUI)	1:38:47	
73	Carel Meyer	South Africa (RSA)	1:39:13	
74	Marco Aguiluz	Honduras (HON)	1:39:17	
75	Gilbert DʼAoust	Canada (CAN)	1:39:32	
76	Marc Varsano	United States (USA)	1:39:47	
77	Béla Breznai	Hungary (HUN)	1:40:40	
78	Bernard Binggeli	Switzerland (SUI)	1:40:45	
79	Arto Hokkanen	Finland (FIN)	1:40:55	
80	Gary Little	New Zealand (NZL)	1:41:13	
81	Jacob Sørensen	Denmark (DEN)	1:41:36	
82	Matti Heikkilä	Finland (FIN)	1:42:08	
83	Claus Jørgensen	Denmark (DEN)	1:42:43	
84	Klaus Jensen	Denmark (DEN)	1:42:48	
85	Roberto Oscal	Guatemala (GUA)	1:43:31	
86	Károly Faragó	Hungary (HUN)	1:43:55	
87	Hugo López	Guatemala (GUA)	1:44:05	
88	Jaime Rodríguez	Colombia (COL)	1:44:57	
89	Urbain Girod	Switzerland (SUI)	1:45:18	
90	Francisco Guzmán	El Salvador (ESA)	1:50:07	
91	Julio Rene Martínez	Guatemala (GUA)	1:51:40	
92	Graeme Jones	New Zealand (NZL)	1:52:42	
93	Balmore Elias	El Salvador (ESA)	1:54:41	
94	Luis Rodríguez	El Salvador (ESA)	2:00:58	
—	Dmitriy Dolnikov	Russia (RUS)	DQ	
—	Anatoliy Kozlov	Ukraine (UKR)	DQ	
—	Cláudio Bertolino	Brazil (BRA)	DNF	
—	Dorel Firica	Canada (CAN)	DNF	
—	Sun Xiaoguang	China (CHN)	DNF	
—	Ralf Rose	Germany (GER)	DNF	
—	Luis Fernando García	Guatemala (GUA)	DNF	
—	Boris Molina	Honduras (HON)	DNF	
—	Rafael Valladares	Honduras (HON)	DNF	
—	Craig Barrett	New Zealand (NZL)	DNF	
—	Shane Donelly	New Zealand (NZL)	DNF	
—	Pascal Charrière	Switzerland (SUI)	DNF	
—	Stefan Johansson	Sweden (SWE)	DNF	

==== Team (20 km men) ====
Place	Country	Points
1st place, gold medalist(s)	Mexico	265 pts
2nd place, silver medalist(s)	Italy	244 pts
3rd place, bronze medalist(s)	Spain	240 pts
4	Poland	229 pts
5	Colombia	225 pts
6	Russia	221 pts
7	China	221 pts
8	Slovakia	210 pts
9	France	208 pts
10	Germany	193 pts
11	Australia	189 pts
12	Belarus	173 pts
13	United Kingdom	166 pts
14	United States	156 pts
15	Hungary	146 pts
16	Brazil	141 pts
17	South Africa	134 pts
18	Sweden	128 pts
19	Finland	105 pts
20	Switzerland	95 pts
21	New Zealand	91 pts
22	Denmark	85 pts
23	Ukraine	83 pts
24	Canada	82 pts
25	Guatemala	73 pts
26	El Salvador	62 pts
27	Honduras	3 pts

=== Men's 50 km ===
Place	Athlete	Nation	Time	Notes
1st place, gold medalist(s)	Carlos Mercenario	Mexico (MEX)	3:50:28	
2nd place, silver medalist(s)	Jesús Ángel García	Spain (ESP)	3:52:44	
3rd place, bronze medalist(s)	Germán Sánchez	Mexico (MEX)	3:54:15	
4	Miguel Rodríguez	Mexico (MEX)	3:54:22	
5	Tim Berrett	Canada (CAN)	3:55:12	
6	Valentin Kononen	Finland (FIN)	3:57:28	
7	Simon Baker	Australia (AUS)	3:58:31	
8	Hartwig Gauder	Germany (GER)	3:59:10	
9	Giuseppe de Gaetano	Italy (ITA)	4:00:19	
10	Jean-Claude Corre	France (FRA)	4:01:12	
11	Martín Bermúdez	Mexico (MEX)	4:01:37	
12	René Piller	France (FRA)	4:02:33	
13	Tomasz Lipiec	Poland (POL)	4:03:09	
14	Massimo Quiriconi	Italy (ITA)	4:04:11	
15	Basilio Labrador	Spain (ESP)	4:04:35	
16	José Marín	Spain (ESP)	4:04:37	
17	Andrés Marin	Spain (ESP)	4:04:52	
18	Thierry Toutain	France (FRA)	4:05:18	
19	Paolo Bianchi	Italy (ITA)	4:05:29	
20	Jaime Barroso	Spain (ESP)	4:06:28	
21	Giacomo Cimarrusti	Italy (ITA)	4:08:07	
22	Alain Lemercier	France (FRA)	4:08:46	
23	Valeriy Spitsyn	Russia (RUS)	4:08:53	
24	Ulf-Peter Sjöholm	Sweden (SWE)	4:09:36	
25	Axel Noack	Germany (GER)	4:10:19	
26	Bruno Penocchio	Italy (ITA)	4:10:37	
27	Michael Harvey	Australia (AUS)	4:10:56	
28	Oleg Bardurchenko	Ukraine (UKR)	4:11:11	
29	Pascal Kieffer	France (FRA)	4:12:16	
30	Miguel Solís	Mexico (MEX)	4:12:53	
31	Jan Kłos	Poland (POL)	4:13:05	
32	Jan Holender	Poland (POL)	4:13:19	
33	Kari Ahonen	Finland (FIN)	4:13:59	
34	Antero Lindman	Finland (FIN)	4:14:15	
35	Andrey Plotnikov	Russia (RUS)	4:14:45	
36	Harold van Beek	Netherlands (NED)	4:15:08	
37	Rimas Arbaciauskas	Lithuania (LTU)	4:15:45	
38	Andrzej Chylinski	United States (USA)	4:17:16	
39	Kęstutis Jezepčikas	Lithuania (LTU)	4:18:17	
40	Štefan Malík	Slovakia (SVK)	4:18:51	
41	Les Morton	Great Britain (GBR)	4:19:29	
42	Anatoliy Grigoryev	Russia (RUS)	4:20:20	
43	Veijo Savikko	Finland (FIN)	4:21:38	
44	Dennis Jackson	Great Britain (GBR)	4:22:12	
45	Sergey Katurayev	Russia (RUS)	4:22:48	
46	Julio Urías	Guatemala (GUA)	4:23:52	
47	Pavel Szikora	Slovakia (SVK)	4:23:58	
48	Craig Brill	Australia (AUS)	4:24:43	
49	Henrik Kjellgren	Sweden (SWE)	4:25:20	
50	Vyacheslav Smirnov	Russia (RUS)	4:27:34	
51	Herman Nelson	United States (USA)	4:27:44	
52	Torben Bogø Kristiansen	Denmark (DEN)	4:28:44	
53	László Sátor	Hungary (HUN)	4:29:05	
54	Aleksandr Stiglenko	Kyrgyzstan (KGZ)	4:29:26	
55	Zoltán Czukor	Hungary (HUN)	4:30:40	
56	Mikhail Shitikov	Belarus (BLR)	4:31:01	
57	David Marchese	United States (USA)	4:31:43	
58	Ervin Leczky	Hungary (HUN)	4:33:24	
59	Miroslav Bosko	Slovakia (SVK)	4:34:52	
60	Henk Plasman	Netherlands (NED)	4:37:26	
61	Ton van Andel	Netherlands (NED)	4:38:28	
62	István Csaba	Hungary (HUN)	4:39:34	
63	Sigitas Vainauskas	Lithuania (LTU)	4:39:59	
64	Aleksey Aleksandrov	Kyrgyzstan (KGZ)	4:40:43	
65	Rasmus Friis	Denmark (DEN)	4:47:09	
66	Dan OʼConnor	United States (USA)	4:48:19	
67	Arturo Huerta	Canada (CAN)	4:51:23	
68	Jorge Citalan	Guatemala (GUA)	4:53:24	
69	Aksel Bendtsen	Denmark (DEN)	4:53:44	
70	Johan Moerdyk	South Africa (RSA)	4:55:45	
71	Pedro Huntjens	Netherlands (NED)	4:57:21	
72	Peer Jensen	Denmark (DEN)	5:02:56	
73	Oliver Mundell	South Africa (RSA)	5:05:36	
74	Gerard Moerdyk	South Africa (RSA)	5:09:02	
75	Aleksandr Germanov	Kyrgyzstan (KGZ)	5:12:01	
—	Aleksandr Potashov	Belarus (BLR)	DQ	
—	Stanislav Vezhel	Belarus (BLR)	DQ	
—	Allan King	Great Britain (GBR)	DQ	
—	Bo Gustafsson	Sweden (SWE)	DQ	
—	Viktor Ginko	Belarus (BLR)	DNF	
—	Paulo Ávila	Brazil (BRA)	DNF	
—	Adhemir Domingues	Brazil (BRA)	DNF	
—	Nelson Rocha	Brazil (BRA)	DNF	
—	Jeff Cassin	Canada (CAN)	DNF	
—	Mario Fernández	Cuba (CUB)	DNF	
—	Edel Oliva	Cuba (CUB)	DNF	
—	Jorge Pino	Cuba (CUB)	DNF	
—	Rafael Martín	Spain (ESP)	DNF	
—	Risto Nurmi	Finland (FIN)	DNF	
—	Mark Easton	Great Britain (GBR)	DNF	
—	Bernd Gummelt	Germany (GER)	DNF	
—	Thomas Wallstab	Germany (GER)	DNF	
—	Nelson Funes	Guatemala (GUA)	DNF	
—	Arvydas Vainauskas	Lithuania (LTU)	DNF	
—	Jacek Bednarek	Poland (POL)	DNF	
—	Roman Parolek	Slovakia (SVK)	DNF	
—	Záhončík Ján	Slovakia (SVK)	DNF	
—	Yuriy Kotlyar	Ukraine (UKR)	DNF	
—	Vitaliy Popovich	Ukraine (UKR)	DNF	
—	Paul Wick	United States (USA)	DNF	

==== Team (50 km men) ====
Place	Country	Points
1st place, gold medalist(s)	Mexico	275 pts
2nd place, silver medalist(s)	Spain	251 pts
3rd place, bronze medalist(s)	France	245 pts
4	Italy	243 pts
5	Finland	225 pts
6	Poland	223 pts
7	Australia	216 pts
8	Russia	203 pts
9	Lithuania	171 pts
10	United States	166 pts
11	Slovakia	165 pts
12	Germany	160 pts
13	Netherlands	155 pts
14	Hungary	149 pts
15	Denmark	132 pts
16	Sweden	130 pts
17	Canada	129 pts
18	Kyrgyzstan	127 pts
19	United Kingdom	120 pts
20	South Africa	108 pts
21	Guatemala	97 pts
22	Ukraine	72 pts
23	Belarus	49 pts
24	Cuba	DNF

=== Lugano Trophy (Team overall Men) ===
The Lugano Trophy, combined the 20km and 50km events team results.

Place	Country	Points
1st place, gold medalist(s)	Mexico	540 pts
2nd place, silver medalist(s)	Spain	491 pts
3rd place, bronze medalist(s)	Italy	487 pts
4	France	453 pts
5	Poland	452 pts
6	Russia	424 pts
7	Australia	405 pts
8	Slovakia	375 pts
9	Germany	353 pts
10	Finland	330 pts
11	United States	322 pts
12	Hungary	295 pts
13	United Kingdom	286 pts
14	Sweden	258 pts
15	South Africa	242 pts
16	Colombia	225 pts
17	Belarus	222 pts
18	China	221 pts
19	Denmark	217 pts
20	Canada	211 pts
21	Lithuania	171 pts
22	Guatemala	170 pts
23	Ukraine	155 pts
24	Netherlands	155 pts
25	Brazil	141 pts
26	Kyrgyzstan	127 pts
27	Switzerland	95 pts
28	New Zealand	91 pts
29	El Salvador	62 pts
30	Honduras	36 pts
31	Cuba	DNF

=== Women's 10 km ===
Place	Athlete	Nation	Time	Notes
1st place, gold medalist(s)	Wang Yan	China (CHN)	45:10	
2nd place, silver medalist(s)	Sari Essayah	Finland (FIN)	45:18	
3rd place, bronze medalist(s)	Yelena Nikolayeva	Russia (RUS)	45:22	
4	Madelein Svensson	Sweden (SWE)	45:43	
5	Kerry Saxby-Junna	Australia (AUS)	45:55	
6	Ileana Salvador	Italy (ITA)	46:02	
7	Annarita Sidoti	Italy (ITA)	46:14	
8	Susana Feitor	Portugal (POR)	46:28	
9	Long Yuwen	China (CHN)	46:34	
10	Elisabetta Perrone	Italy (ITA)	46:49	
11	Yelena Gruzinova	Russia (RUS)	46:56	
12	Olimpiada Ivanova	Russia (RUS)	47:02	
13	Beate Gummelt	Germany (GER)	47:06	
14	Cristiana Pellino	Italy (ITA)	47:33	
15	Alison Baker	Canada (CAN)	47:34	
16	Mária Urbanik	Hungary (HUN)	47:37	
17	Beata Kaczmarska	Poland (POL)	47:54	
18	Liu Hongyu	China (CHN)	47:56	
19	Andrea Alföldi	Hungary (HUN)	47:59	
20	Nataliya Misyulya	Belarus (BLR)	47:59	
21	Gabrielle Blythe	Australia (AUS)	48:00	
22	Encarna Granados	Spain (ESP)	48:08	
23	Maria del Rosario Sánchez	Mexico (MEX)	48:11	
24	Yuka Mitsumori	Japan (JPN)	48:21	
25	Yelena Sayko	Russia (RUS)	48:33	
26	Jenny Jones-Billington	Australia (AUS)	48:36	
27	Mari Cruz Díaz	Spain (ESP)	48:45	
28	Erica Alfridi	Italy (ITA)	48:48	
29	Ildikó Ilyés	Hungary (HUN)	48:55	
30	Anne Manning	Australia (AUS)	48:59	
31	María Colín	Mexico (MEX)	49:09	
32	Natalya Serbiyenko	Ukraine (UKR)	49:25	
33	Emilia Cano	Spain (ESP)	49:31	
34	Rie Mitsumori	Japan (JPN)	49:39	
35	Valentina Tsybulskaya	Belarus (BLR)	49:41	
36	Kathrin Born-Boyde	Germany (GER)	49:41	
37	Valérie Lévèque-Nadaud	France (FRA)	49:44	
38	Veronica Öqvist	Sweden (SWE)	49:46	
39	Eva Machuca	Mexico (MEX)	49:54	
40	Anikó Szebenszky	Hungary (HUN)	50:01	
41	Maribel Rebollo	Mexico (MEX)	50:06	
42	Yekaterina Samolenko	Ukraine (UKR)	50:10	
43	Jane Saville	Australia (AUS)	50:15	
44	Debbie van Orden	United States (USA)	50:22	
45	Maya Sazonova	Kazakhstan (KAZ)	50:24	
46	Dana Yarbrough	United States (USA)	50:40	
47	Isilda Gonçalves	Portugal (POR)	50:54	
48	Julie Drake	Great Britain (GBR)	50:58	
49	Hilde Gustafsen	Norway (NOR)	51:15	
50	Emi Hayashi	Japan (JPN)	51:21	
51	Anne-Catherine Berthonnaud	France (FRA)	51:32	
52	Galina Arutinova	Kazakhstan (KAZ)	51:43	
53	Cindy March	United States (USA)	51:45	
54	Olga Sánchez	Spain (ESP)	51:46	
55	Simone Thust	Germany (GER)	51:56	
56	Leonarda Yukhevich	Belarus (BLR)	52:15	
57	Verity Larby-Snook	Great Britain (GBR)	52:16	
58	Hanne Liland	Norway (NOR)	52:22	
59	Kjersti Plätzer	Norway (NOR)	52:34	
60	Beata Janaszek	Poland (POL)	52:43	
61	Natalya Yermolenko	Kazakhstan (KAZ)	52:45	
62	Kora Sommerfeldt	France (FRA)	52:57	
63	Nailze Pazin	Brazil (BRA)	53:10	
64	Ann-Marie Mesmoudi	France (FRA)	53:17	
65	Irina Tolstik	Belarus (BLR)	53:19	
66	Corinne Whissel	Canada (CAN)	53:38	
67	Vicky Lupton	Great Britain (GBR)	53:39	
68	Lidia Pereira	Portugal (POR)	53:42	
69	Maria Magdalena Guzmán	El Salvador (ESA)	53:53	
70	Francene Bustos	United States (USA)	54:13	
71	Ivis Martínez	El Salvador (ESA)	54:13	
72	Beáta Szászi	Hungary (HUN)	54:16	
73	Anneli Kuukkanen	Finland (FIN)	54:40	
74	María Reyes Sobrino	Spain (ESP)	54:43	
75	Sofia Avoila	Portugal (POR)	54:45	
76	Rosemar Piazza	Brazil (BRA)	54:59	
77	Sandy Leddin	Germany (GER)	55:00	
78	Susan Hornung	Canada (CAN)	55:16	
79	Ligia Gonçalves	Portugal (POR)	56:20	
80	Åslaug Mostad	Norway (NOR)	56:20	
81	Sylvia Saunders/Black	Great Britain (GBR)	56:28	
82	Sara Standley	United States (USA)	57:59	
83	Lidia Carriego	Argentina (ARG)	58:19	
84	Ofelia Puyol	Argentina (ARG)	60:43	
85	Olga Buitrago	Argentina (ARG)	61:05	
86	Silvia Valencia	El Salvador (ESA)	64:43	
—	Katarzyna Radtke	Poland (POL)	DQ	
—	Ivana Henn	Brazil (BRA)	DNF	
—	Pascale Grand	Canada (CAN)	DNF	
—	Janice McCaffrey	Canada (CAN)	DNF	
—	Gao Hongmiao	China (CHN)	DNF	
—	Zhang Qinghua	China (CHN)	DNF	
—	Mira Saastamoinen	Finland (FIN)	DNF	
—	Graciela Mendoza	Mexico (MEX)	DNF	
—	Beata Betlej	Poland (POL)	DNF	
—	Yelena Arshintseva	Russia (RUS)	DNF	
—	Monica Gunnarsson	Sweden (SWE)	DNF	
—	Tatyana Ragozina	Ukraine (UKR)	DNF	

=== Eschborn Cup (Team Women 10 km) ===
Place	Country	Points
1st place, gold medalist(s)	Italy	196 pts
2nd place, silver medalist(s)	China	193 pts
3rd place, bronze medalist(s)	Russia	193 pts
4	Australia	170 pts
5	Hungary	160 pts
6	Spain	144 pts
7	Mexico	135 pts
8	Germany	127 pts
9	Japan	123 pts
10	Belarus	121 pts
11	Portugal	113 pts
12	Sweden	108 pts
13	United States	97 pts
14	France	88 pts
15	Canada	86 pts
16	Finland	83 pts
17	Kazakhstan	83 pts
18	Ukraine	82 pts
19	Poland	78 pts
20	Norway	76 pts
21	United Kingdom	72 pts
22	El Salvador	33 pts
23	Brazil	29 pts
24	Argentina	24 pts

== Participation ==
The participation of 303 athletes (205 men/98 women) from 36 countries is reported.

- Argentina (-/3)
- Australia (6/5)
- Belarus (8/4)
- Brazil (6/3)
- Canada (6/5)
- China (5/5)
- Colombia (4/-)
- Cuba (3/-)
- Denmark (7/-)
- El Salvador (3/3)
- Finland (8/3)
- France (10/4)
- Germany (9/4)
- Guatemala (7/-)
- Honduras (3/-)
- Hungary (8/5)
- Italy (10/5)
- Japan (-/3)
- Kazakhstan (-/3)
- Kyrgyzstan (3/-)
- Lithuania (4/-)
- Mexico (10/5)
- Netherlands (4/-)
- New Zealand (5/-)
- Norway (-/4)
- Poland (9/4)
- Portugal (-/5)
- Russia (10/5)
- Slovakia (9/-)
- South Africa (6/-)
- Spain (9/5)
- Sweden (6/3)
- Switzerland (4/-)
- Ukraine (6/3)
- United Kingdom (8/4)
- United States (10/5)
