= 10 kilometres race walk =

Racewalking competition over 10 kilometres

Athletics 10-kilometer walk
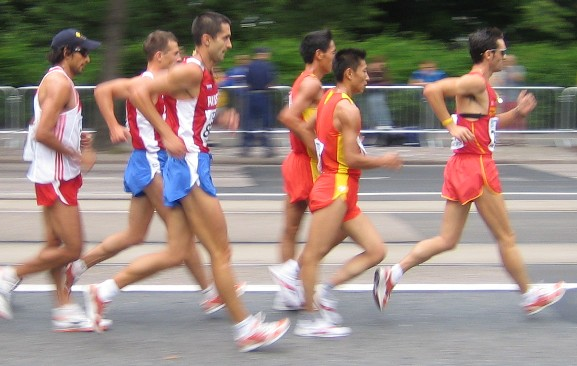
- Men's racewalk. Walker at right appears to be illegal in that both feet are off the ground, but an infraction is only committed when loss of contact is visible to the human eye.

World records
- Men: (Russia) Roman Rasskazov 37:11 (2000)
- Women: (Russia) Yelena Nikolayeva 41:04 (1996)

The 10 kilometres race walk, or 10-kilometer racewalk, is a racewalking event. The event is competed as a road race. Athletes must always keep in contact with the ground and the supporting leg must remain straight until the raised leg passes it. 10 kilometers is 6.2 miles.

== History ==
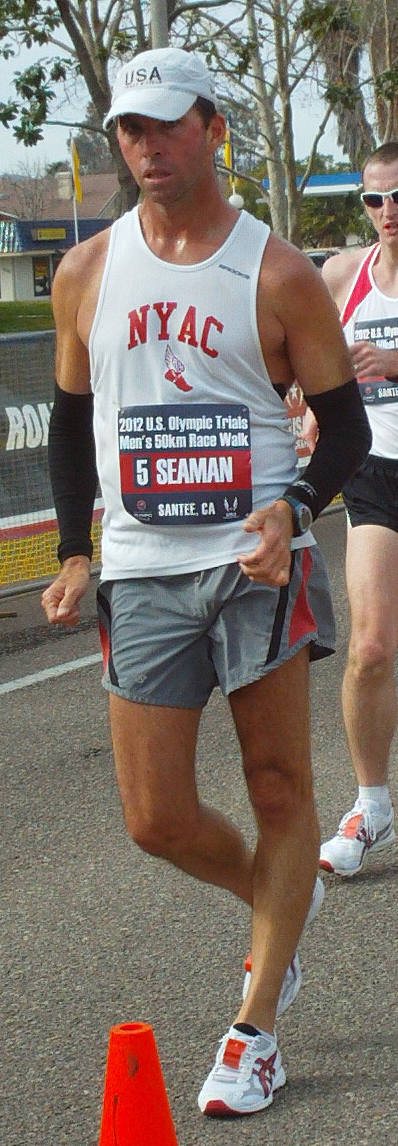
Timothy Seaman, U.S. record holder

It was introduced at the 1912 Summer Olympics in Stockholm for men, and the 1992 Summer Olympics in Barcelona for women. It is no longer an Olympic event, having been changed to 20 km after 1952 for men and in 1999 for women, though it is still run in some international competitions.

== World records ==
On May 28, 2000, Roman Rasskazov of Russia set a new 10-km race walk world record in Saransk in a time of 37:11. The all-time women's 10-km race-walk record is held by Yelena Nikolayeva of Russia, at 41:04.

== All-time top 25 ==
=== Men ===
- Correct as of February 2024.

Rank	Result	Athlete	Nationality	Date	Place	Ref.
1	37:11	Roman Rasskazov	Russia	28 May 2000	Saransk	
2	37:33	Erik Tysse	Norway	27 August 2006	Hildesheim	
3	37:44	Wang Zhen	China	18 September 2010	Beijing	
4	37:50	Andreas Erm	Germany	27 May 2000	Berlin	
5	37:52	Francisco Javier Fernández	Spain	8 June 2002	Kraków	
6	37:57	Robert Korzeniowski	Poland	8 June 2002	Kraków	
6	37:57	Zhu Yafei	China	18 September 2010	Beijing	
8	38:00	Giorgio Rubino	Italy	18 September 2010	Beijing	
8	38:00	Wang Hao	China	18 September 2010	Beijing	
8	38:00	Vasiliy Mizinov	Russia	23 August 2020	Voronovo	
11	38:01	Pyotr Trofimov	Russia	13 September 2014	Bui	
12	38:03	Eiki Takahashi	Japan	16 April 2016	Wajima	
13	38:04.7	Artur Meleshkevich	Bulgaria	9 June 2001	Kraków	
14	38:09.7	Nathan Deakes	Australia	9 June 2001	Kraków	
15	38:10	Luis Fernando López	Colombia	18 September 2010	Beijing	
16	38:11	Valeriy Borchin	Russia	30 May 2009	Kraków	
17	38:13	Kim Hyun-sub	South Korea	18 September 2010	Beijing	
18	38:16+	Koki Ikeda	Japan	18 February 2024	Kobe	
19	38:17	Andrey Rudnitskiy	Russia	19 September 2009	Saransk	
20	38:19	Ivano Brugnetti	Italy	9 September 2007	Fiumicino	
21	38:21	Ilya Markov	Russia	27 August 2006	Hildesheim	
22	38:23	Chen Ding	China	18 September 2010	Beijing	
23	38:24	Jefferson Pérez	Ecuador	8 June 2002	Kraków	
24	38:26+	Masatora Kawano	Japan	18 February 2024	Kobe	
25	38:26.4	Daniel García	Mexico	17 May 1997	Sønder Omme	

==== Notes ====
Below is a list of other times equal or superior to 38:27:

- Francisco Javier Fernández also walked 38:01.4 (2001), 38:12 (2006), 38:25 (2007).
- Robert Korzeniowski also walked 38:03.2 (2001).
- Ilya Markov also walked 38:25 (2007).

=== Women ===
- Correct as of October 2020.

Rank	Result	Athlete	Nationality	Date	Place	Ref.
1	41:04	Yelena Nikolayeva	Russia	20 April 1996	Sochi	
2	41:16	Wang Yan	China	8 May 1999	Eisenhüttenstadt	
2	41:16	Kjersti Plätzer	Norway	11 May 2002	Os	
4	41:17	Irina Stankina	Russia	9 February 1997	Adler	
5	41:24	Olimpiada Ivanova	Russia	9 February 1997	Adler	
6	41:28	Antonella Palmisano	Italy	18 October 2020	Modena	
7	41:29	Larisa Khmelnitskaya	Belarus	4 June 1995	Izhevsk	
8	41:29.7	Kerry Saxby-Junna	Australia	27 August 1988	Canberra	
9	41:30 (Note: not recognised by national federation because of doubtful distance)	Ileana Salvador	Italy	10 July 1993	Livorno	
10	41:31	Yelena Gruzinova	Russia	20 April 1996	Sochi	
11	41:38	Rossella Giordano	Italy	25 May 1997	Naumburg	
12	41:42	Olga Kaniskina	Russia	30 May 2009	Kraków	
13	41:45	Liu Hongyu	China	8 May 1999	Eisenhüttenstadt	
14	41:46	Annarita Sidoti	Italy	12 June 1994	Livorno	
15	41:48	Li Chunxiu	China	8 September 1993	Beijing	
16	41:50	Yelena Arshintseva	Russia	11 February 1995	Adler	
17	41:51	Beate Gummelt	Germany	11 May 1996	Eisenhüttenstadt	
18	41:52	Tatyana Mineyeva	Russia	5 September 2009	Penza	
18	41:52	Tatyana Korotkova	Russia	19 September 2010	Buy	
20	41:53	Tatyana Sibileva	Russia	18 September 2010	Beijing	
21	41:56	Elisabetta Perrone	Italy	10 July 1993	Livorno	
21	41:56	Yelena Sayko	Russia	11 February 1996	Adler	
23	41:57	Gao Hongmiao	China	8 September 1993	Beijing	
24	41:59	Marina Pandakova	Russia	9 May 2016	Podolsk	
25	42:01	Tamara Kovalenko	Russia	11 February 1995	Adler	
25	42:01	Olga Panfyorova	Russia	16 May 1998	Izhevsk	

==== Notes ====
Below is a list of other times equal or superior to 42:01:

- Olimpiada Ivanova also walked 41:30 (1995), 41:46 (1996) and 41:59 (1997).
- Yelena Nikolayeva also walked 41:41 (1997) and 41:49 (1996).
- Kjersti Plätzer also walked 41:41 (2009), 41:54 (1999) and 41:56 (2002).
- Kerry Saxby-Junna also walked 41:47 (1996).
- Larisa Khmelnitskaya also walked 41:49 (1996) and 41:56 (1997).
- Irina Stankina also walked 41:52 (1997), 41:55 (1995) and 42:01 (1996).
- Yelena Gruzinova also walked 41:58 (1995).

== Medalists ==
=== Men's Olympic medalists ===
Games	Gold	Silver	Bronze
1912 Stockholm	George Goulding; Canada	Ernest Webb; Great Britain	Fernando Altimani; Italy
1920 Antwerp	Ugo Frigerio; Italy	Joseph Pearman; United States	Charles Gunn; Great Britain
1924 Paris	Ugo Frigerio; Italy	Gordon Goodwin; Great Britain	Cecil McMaster; South Africa
1928–1936	not included in the Olympic program		
1948 London	John Mikaelsson; Sweden	Ingemar Johansson; Sweden	Fritz Schwab; Switzerland
1952 Helsinki	John Mikaelsson; Sweden	Fritz Schwab; Switzerland	Bruno Junk; Soviet Union

=== Women's Olympic medalists ===
Games	Gold	Silver	Bronze
1992 Barcelona	Chen Yueling; China	Yelena Nikolayeva; Unified Team	Li Chunxiu; China
1996 Atlanta	Yelena Nikolayeva; Russia	Elisabetta Perrone; Italy	Wang Yan; China

=== Women's World Championships medalists ===
Championships	Gold	Silver	Bronze
1987 Rome	Irina Strakhova (URS)	Kerry Saxby-Junna (AUS)	Yan Hong (CHN)
1991 Tokyo	Alina Ivanova (URS)	Madelein Svensson (SWE)	Sari Essayah (FIN)
1993 Stuttgart	Sari Essayah (FIN)	Ileana Salvador (ITA)	Encarna Granados (ESP)
1995 Gothenburg	Irina Stankina (RUS)	Annarita Sidoti (ITA)	Yelena Nikolayeva (RUS)
1997 Athens	Annarita Sidoti (ITA)	Olga Kardopoltseva (BLR)	Valentina Tsybulskaya (BLR)

== World leading times ==
=== Men ===
Year	Time	Athlete	Place
2016	38:03	Eiki Takahashi (JPN)	Wajima
2020	38:00	Vasiliy Mizinov (RUS)	Voronovo
2026	39:15	Francesco Fortunato (ITA)	Madrid

=== Women ===
Year	Time	Athlete	Place
2016	41:59	Marina Pandakova (RUS)	Podolsk
2026	42:52	Elizabeth McMillen (AUS)	Melbourne
