= 1991 IAAF World Race Walking Cup =

- Organisers: IAAF
- Edition: 15th
- Date: June 1–2
- Host city: San Jose, California, United States
- Events: 3
- Participation: 309 athletes from 33 nations

The 1991 IAAF World Race Walking Cup was held on 1 and 2 June 1991 in the streets of San Jose, California, USA. The event was also known as IAAF Race Walking World Cup. The course followed a loop along Park Avenue and Almaden Boulevard, north and east of the intersection.

Complete results were published.

== Medallists ==
Event	Gold		Silver		Bronze	
Men
Men's 20 km walk	Mikhail Shchennikov; Soviet Union	1:20:43	Ernesto Canto; Mexico	1:20:46	Thierry Toutain; France	1:20:56
Men's 50 km walk	Carlos Mercenario; Mexico	3:42:03	Simon Baker; Australia	3:46:36	Ronald Weigel; Germany	3:47:50
Lugano Cup (Men)
Team (Men)	Italy	517 pts	Germany	491 pts	Mexico	487 pts
Women
Women's 10 km walk	Irina Strakhova; Soviet Union	43:55	Graciela Mendoza; Mexico	44:09	Yelena Sayko; Soviet Union	44:11
Eschborn Cup (Women)
Team (Women)	Soviet Union	203 pts	Italy	180 pts	Mexico	162 pts

== Results ==
=== Men's 20 km ===
Place	Athlete	Nation	Time	Notes
1st place, gold medalist(s)	Mikhail Shchennikov	Soviet Union (URS)	1:20:43	
2nd place, silver medalist(s)	Ernesto Canto	Mexico (MEX)	1:20:46	
3rd place, bronze medalist(s)	Thierry Toutain	France (FRA)	1:20:56	
4	Daniel Plaza	Spain (ESP)	1:21:00	
5	Giovanni De Benedictis	Italy (ITA)	1:21:13	PB
6	Walter Arena	Italy (ITA)	1:21:13	
7	Robert Korzeniowski	Poland (POL)	1:21:19	
8	Maurizio Damilano	Italy (ITA)	1:21:31	
9	Axel Noack	Germany (GER)	1:21:35	
10	Valentí Massana	Spain (ESP)	1:21:38	
11	Li Mingcai	China (CHN)	1:21:56	
12	Joel Sánchez	Mexico (MEX)	1:22:03	
13	José Urbano	Portugal (POR)	1:22:04	
14	Miguel Ángel Prieto	Spain (ESP)	1:22:19	
15	Nicholas A'Hern	Australia (AUS)	1:22:21	
16	Andrey Plotnikov	Soviet Union (URS)	1:22:29	
17	Sándor Urbanik	Hungary (HUN)	1:22:38	
18	Héctor Moreno	Colombia (COL)	1:22:40	
19	Robert Ihly	Germany (GER)	1:22:52	
20	Martial Fesselier	France (FRA)	1:22:59	
21	Bo Lingtang	China (CHN)	1:23:00	
22	Tim Berrett	Canada (CAN)	1:23:10	
23	Roman Mrázek	Czechoslovakia (TCH)	1:23:30	
24	Aleksey Pershin	Soviet Union (URS)	1:23:32	
25	Ján Záhončík	Czechoslovakia (TCH)	1:23:49	
26	Sergio Galdino	Brazil (BRA)	1:23:58	
27	Vladimir Andreyev	Soviet Union (URS)	1:23:59	
28	Jimmy McDonald	Ireland (IRL)	1:24:07	
29	Orlando Díaz	Colombia (COL)	1:24:08	
30	Pavol Blažek	Czechoslovakia (TCH)	1:24:27	
31	Olegario Regidor	Spain (ESP)	1:24:29	
32	Zbigniew Sadlej	Poland (POL)	1:24:55	
33	Sławomir Cielica	Poland (POL)	1:24:57	
34	Ralf Weise	Germany (GER)	1:25:08	
35	Hubert Sonnek	Czechoslovakia (TCH)	1:25:10	
36	Querubín Moreno	Colombia (COL)	1:25:11	
37	Valentin Kononen	Finland (FIN)	1:25:17	
38	Ian McCombie	Great Britain (GBR)	1:25:10	
39	Sergio Spagnulo	Italy (ITA)	1:25:30	
40	Sun Xiaoguang	China (CHN)	1:25:33	
41	Jean-Claude Corre	France (FRA)	1:25:35	
42	Martin Rush	Great Britain (GBR)	1:25:42	
43	Arturo Di Mezza	Italy (ITA)	1:25:45	
44	Igor Kollár	Czechoslovakia (TCH)	1:25:57	
45	Krzysztof Richter	Poland (POL)	1:26:13	
46	Dave Smith	Australia (AUS)	1:26:14	
47	Gyula Dudás	Hungary (HUN)	1:26:54	
48	Helder Oliveira	Portugal (POR)	1:26:58	
49	Augusto Cardoso	Portugal (POR)	1:27:08	
50	Michael Lane	Ireland (IRL)	1:27:34	
51	Julio César Urías	Guatemala (GUA)	1:27:45	
52	Bernardo Segura	Mexico (MEX)	1:27:55	
53	Mark Easton	Great Britain (GBR)	1:27:57	
54	Tim Lewis	United States (USA)	1:28:04	
55	Christophe Cousin	France (FRA)	1:28:14	
56	Curtis Fisher	United States (USA)	1:28:15	
57	Andrew Penn	Great Britain (GBR)	1:28:28	
58	Tadahiro Kosaka	Japan (JPN)	1:28:42	
59	Andrew Jachno	Australia (AUS)	1:29:22	
60	Karoly Kirszt	Hungary (HUN)	1:29:24	
61	Pat Murphy	Ireland (IRL)	1:27:34	
62	Abdel Wahab Ferguène	Algeria (ALG)	1:29:51	
63	Michael Harvey	Australia (AUS)	1:29:59	
64	Yoshimi Hara	Japan (JPN)	1:30:06	
65	Mario Contreiras	Portugal (POR)	1:30:07	
66	Clodomiro Moreno	Colombia (COL)	1:30:16	
67	Allen James	United States (USA)	1:30:25	
68	Fabrice Delaforge	France (FRA)	1:30:36	
69	Pauli Pirjetä	Finland (FIN)	1:30:49	
70	Olaf Möldner	Germany (GER)	1:31:09	
71	João Sendenski	Brazil (BRA)	1:31:44	
72	Hammimed Rahouli	Algeria (ALG)	1:32:01	
73	Cláudio Bertolino	Brazil (BRA)	1:32:06	
74	Martin St. Pierre	Canada (CAN)	1:32:07	
75	Douglas Fournier	United States (USA)	1:32:09	
76	Pascal Charrière	Switzerland (SUI)	1:32:11	
77	Risto Nurmi	Finland (FIN)	1:32:29	
78	Derek Beaven	New Zealand (NZL)	1:32:38	
79	Arezki Boumar	Algeria (ALG)	1:32:47	
80	Scott Nelson	New Zealand (NZL)	1:33:10	
81	Zsolt Szilagyi	Hungary (HUN)	1:33:39	
82	Rene Haarpainter	Switzerland (SUI)	1:34:02	
83	Abderrazak Gharfaa	Algeria (ALG)	1:34:22	
84	Leighton Poidevin	Canada (CAN)	1:34:50	
85	Dan Bauer	Germany (GER)	1:34:59	
86	Craig Barrett	New Zealand (NZL)	1:35:34	
87	Daniel Levesque	Canada (CAN)	1:36:07	
88	Peter Ferrari	Sweden (SWE)	1:36:18	
89	Göran Lindé	Sweden (SWE)	1:36:20	
90	Ademar Kammler	Brazil (BRA)	1:37:44	
91	Julio René Martínez	Guatemala (GUA)	1:37:58	
92	Axel Thiele	Sweden (SWE)	1:38:22	
93	Henrik Kjellgren	Sweden (SWE)	1:38:46	
94	Bernard Binggeli	Switzerland (SUI)	1:38:46	
95	Ivan Hernández	Puerto Rico (PUR)	1:39:08	
96	José Torres	Puerto Rico (PUR)	1:39:08	
97	Ron Enns	Canada (CAN)	1:40:25	
98	Nelson Funes	Guatemala (GUA)	1:40:36	
99	Daniele Carrobio	Switzerland (SUI)	1:41:17	
100	Sean Sullivan	New Zealand (NZL)	1:41:54	
101	Roberto Oscal	Guatemala (GUA)	1:42:37	
102	José Mencos	Guatemala (GUA)	1:47:39	
103	Sucha Singh	India (IND)	1:48:04	
104	Harmesh Lal	India (IND)	1:48:11	
105	Harmana Ram	India (IND)	1:59:53	
106	Feston Bwalya	Zambia (ZAM)	2:06:11	
107	Patrick Nkhata	Zambia (ZAM)	2:12:45	
—	Paul Copeland	Australia (AUS)	DQ	
—	Marcelo Palma	Brazil (BRA)	DQ	
—	Víctor Sánchez	Mexico (MEX)	DQ	
—	Ignacio Zamudio	Mexico (MEX)	DQ	
—	Jonathan Kinga	Zambia (ZAM)	DQ	
—	Godfried De Jonckheere	Belgium (BEL)	DNF	
—	Gerard Goujon	Belgium (BEL)	DNF	
—	Luc Nicque	Belgium (BEL)	DNF	
—	German Nieto	Spain (ESP)	DNF	
—	Hirofumi Sakai	Japan (JPN)	DNF	
—	Theo Koenis	Netherlands (NED)	DNF	
—	Ton van Andel	Netherlands (NED)	DNF	
—	Harold van Beek	Netherlands (NED)	DNF	
—	Hans van den Knaap	Netherlands (NED)	DNF	
—	José Ramírez	Puerto Rico (PUR)	DNF	
—	Darryl Guy-Williams	Sierra Leone (SLE)	DNF	
—	Kelly Keita Lansana	Sierra Leone (SLE)	DNF	
—	Franz Kostyukevich	Soviet Union (URS)	DNF	
—	Don Lawrence	United States (USA)	DNF	
—	Jeresani Bwalya	Zambia (ZAM)	DNF	

=== Men's 50 km ===
Place	Athlete	Nation	Time	Notes
1st place, gold medalist(s)	Carlos Mercenario	Mexico (MEX)	3:42:03	
2nd place, silver medalist(s)	Simon Baker	Australia (AUS)	3:46:36	
3rd place, bronze medalist(s)	Ronald Weigel	Germany (GER)	3:47:50	
4	Bernd Gummelt	Germany (GER)	3:51:12	
5	Giovanni Perricelli	Italy (ITA)	3:52:51	
6	Hartwig Gauder	Germany (GER)	3:53:14	
7	Miguel Rodríguez	Mexico (MEX)	3:54:36	
8	Valeriy Spitsyn	Soviet Union (URS)	3:55:13	
9	Giuseppe de Gaetano	Italy (ITA)	3:55:45	
10	René Piller	France (FRA)	3:55:48	
11	Martín Bermúdez	Mexico (MEX)	3:58:33	
12	Fumio Imamura	Japan (JPN)	3:59:18	
13	Godfried De Jonckheere	Belgium (BEL)	3:59:26	
14	Alessandro Bellucci	Italy (ITA)	3:59:43	
15	Anatoliy Grigoryev	Soviet Union (URS)	4:00:35	
16	Pavol Szikora	Czechoslovakia (TCH)	4:00:39	
17	José Marín	Spain (ESP)	4:01:02	
18	Massimo Quiriconi	Italy (ITA)	4:01:21	
19	Veijo Savikko	Finland (FIN)	4:01:28	
20	Les Morton	Great Britain (GBR)	4:02:11	
21	Takehiro Sonohara	Japan (JPN)	4:02:17	
22	Jacek Bednarek	Poland (POL)	4:03:31	
23	Basilio Labrador	Spain (ESP)	4:03:42	
24	Bo Gustafsson	Sweden (SWE)	4:04:04	
25	Paul Blagg	Great Britain (GBR)	4:04:09	
26	Jorge Llopart	Spain (ESP)	4:06:07	
27	Zoltán Czukor	Hungary (HUN)	4:06:21	
28	Denis Terraz	France (FRA)	4:06:48	
29	Germán Sánchez	Mexico (MEX)	4:07:37	
30	Torsten Trampeli	Germany (GER)	4:07:48	
31	Carl Schueler	United States (USA)	4:08:51	
32	Jean-Olivier Brosseau	France (FRA)	4:08:59	
33	Jaroslav Makovec	Czechoslovakia (TCH)	4:09:57	
34	Ulf-Peter Sjöholm	Sweden (SWE)	4:11:07	
35	Grzegorz Ledzion	Poland (POL)	4:11:43	
36	László Sátor	Hungary (HUN)	4:11:46	
37	Štefan Malík	Czechoslovakia (TCH)	4:12:07	
38	Antero Lindman	Finland (FIN)	4:12:33	
39	Carlo Mattioli	Italy (ITA)	4:12:48	
40	Hubert Sonnek	Czechoslovakia (TCH)	4:14:03	
41	Alexander Preusche	Germany (GER)	4:14:53	
42	Zhang Shiquan	China (CHN)	4:18:10	
43	Gyula Dudás	Hungary (HUN)	4:19:50	
44	Ton van Andel	Netherlands (NED)	4:19:58	
45	Chris Maddocks	Great Britain (GBR)	4:20:05	
46	Aldo Bertoldi	Switzerland (SUI)	4:21:24	
47	José Magalhães	Portugal (POR)	4:21:30	
48	Faustino Ruíz	Spain (ESP)	4:23:13	
49	Arto Hokkanen	Finland (FIN)	4:23:42	
50	Paul McElwee	New Zealand (NZL)	4:24:10	
51	Wolfgang Varrin	Switzerland (SUI)	4:24:46	
52	Janusz Goławski	Poland (POL)	4:25:25	
53	Harold van Beek	Netherlands (NED)	4:25:37	
54	Thierry Nuttin	France (FRA)	4:25:59	
55	Dennis Jackson	Great Britain (GBR)	4:26:08	
56	Matti Heikkilä	Finland (FIN)	4:26:24	
57	António Kohler	Brazil (BRA)	4:27:01	
58	Ricky Cooke	Australia (AUS)	4:28:15	
59	Dan OʼConnor	United States (USA)	4:30:22	
60	Theo Koenis	Netherlands (NED)	4:30:52	
61	Renzo Toscanelli	Switzerland (SUI)	4:33:32	
62	Gerard Goujon	Belgium (BEL)	4:38:16	
63	Gary Little	New Zealand (NZL)	4:39:27	
64	Hans van den Knaap	Netherlands (NED)	4:44:46	
65	Jean Claude Zaugg	Switzerland (SUI)	4:45:00	
66	Miroslav Bosko	Czechoslovakia (TCH)	4:46:20	
67	Carlos Graça	Portugal (POR)	4:53:47	
68	Luc Nicque	Belgium (BEL)	4:55:12	
69	Ottoniel Ardila	Guatemala (GUA)	4:58:07	
70	Paulo Ávila	Brazil (BRA)	4:59:33	
71	Wayne Marriott	New Zealand (NZL)	5:10:06	
72	José Santos	Guatemala (GUA)	5:13:31	
73	Mark Gray	New Zealand (NZL)	5:28:23	
—	Craig Brill	Australia (AUS)	DQ	
—	Bill Dyer	Australia (AUS)	DQ	
—	Zhao Wanbo	China (CHN)	DQ	
—	Andrey Perlov	Soviet Union (URS)	DQ	
—	Vitaliy Popovich	Soviet Union (URS)	DQ	
—	Aleksandr Potashov	Soviet Union (URS)	DQ	
—	Arezki Boumar	Algeria (ALG)	DNF	
—	Abdel Wahab Ferguène	Algeria (ALG)	DNF	
—	Hammimed Rahouli	Algeria (ALG)	DNF	
—	Kevin Lowden	Australia (AUS)	DNF	
—	Cicero de Moura	Brazil (BRA)	DNF	
—	Tim Berrett	Canada (CAN)	DNF	
—	Ron Enns	Canada (CAN)	DNF	
—	Daniel Levesque	Canada (CAN)	DNF	
—	Leighton Poidevin	Canada (CAN)	DNF	
—	Martin St. Pierre	Canada (CAN)	DNF	
—	Zhou Yongsheng	China (CHN)	DNF	
—	Orlando Díaz	Colombia (COL)	DNF	
—	Héctor Moreno	Colombia (COL)	DNF	
—	Querubín Moreno	Colombia (COL)	DNF	
—	Jaime Barroso	Spain (ESP)	DNF	
—	Alain Lemercier	France (FRA)	DNF	
—	Hugo López	Guatemala (GUA)	DNF	
—	Endre Andrasfai	Hungary (HUN)	DNF	
—	Harmesh Lal	India (IND)	DNF	
—	Rewat Singh	India (IND)	DNF	
—	Michael Lane	Ireland (IRL)	DNF	
—	Jimmy McDonald	Ireland (IRL)	DNF	
—	Pat Murphy	Ireland (IRL)	DNF	
—	Tadahiro Kosaka	Japan (JPN)	DNF	
—	Hernán Andrade	Mexico (MEX)	DNF	
—	Jan Holender	Poland (POL)	DNF	
—	José Pinto	Portugal (POR)	DNF	
—	Ivan Hernández	Puerto Rico (PUR)	DNF	
—	José Ramírez	Puerto Rico (PUR)	DNF	
—	José Torres	Puerto Rico (PUR)	DNF	
—	Robert Dauphine	Sierra Leone (SLE)	DNF	
—	Baba Suma-Keita	Sierra Leone (SLE)	DNF	
—	James Toussaint	Sierra Leone (SLE)	DNF	
—	Stefan Johansson	Sweden (SWE)	DNF	
—	Jan Olsson	Sweden (SWE)	DNF	
—	Marco Evoniuk	United States (USA)	DNF	
—	Eugene Kitts	United States (USA)	DNF	
—	Paul Wick	United States (USA)	DNF	
—	Feston Bwalya	Zambia (ZAM)	DNF	
—	Jonathan Kinga	Zambia (ZAM)	DNF	
—	Patrick Nkhata	Zambia (ZAM)	DNF	

=== Team (men) ===
The team rankings, named Lugano Trophy, combined the 20 km and 50 km events team results.

Place	Country	Points
1st place, gold medalist(s)	Italy	517 pts
2nd place, silver medalist(s)	Germany	491 pts
3rd place, bronze medalist(s)	Mexico	487 pts
4	Spain	472 pts
5	France	438 pts
6	Soviet Union	407 pts
7	Czechoslovakia	407 pts
8	Poland	398 pts
9	United Kingdom	363 pts
10	Hungary	360 pts
11	Finland	317 pts
12	Australia	316 pts
13	Portugal	279 pts
14	China	272 pts
15	United States	243 pts
16	Japan	241 pts
17	Switzerland	229 pts
18	Brazil	224 pts
19	New Zealand	214 pts
20	Sweden	205 pts
21	Colombia	203 pts
22	Guatemala	164 pts
23	Belgium	162 pts
24	Ireland	160 pts
25	Netherlands	148 pts
26	Canada	133 pts
27	Algeria	107 pts
28	India	48 pts
29	Puerto Rico	39 pts
30	Zambia	27 pts
31	Sierra Leone	DNF

=== Women's 10 km ===
Place	Athlete	Nation	Time	Notes
1st place, gold medalist(s)	Irina Strakhova	Soviet Union (URS)	43:55	
2nd place, silver medalist(s)	Graciela Mendoza	Mexico (MEX)	44:09	
3rd place, bronze medalist(s)	Yelena Sayko	Soviet Union (URS)	44:11	
4	Olga Kardopoltseva	Soviet Union (URS)	44:36	
5	Kerry Saxby-Junna	Australia (AUS)	44:49	
6	Ileana Salvador	Italy (ITA)	44:52	
7	Beate Gummelt	Germany (GER)	45:03	
8	Nadezhda Ryashkina	Soviet Union (URS)	45:19	
9	Annarita Sidoti	Italy (ITA)	45:28	
10	Mari Cruz Díaz	Spain (ESP)	46:38	
11	Andrea Alföldi	Hungary (HUN)	45:42	
12	Fan Xiaoling	China (CHN)	45:53	
13	Madelein Svensson	Sweden (SWE)	45:57	
14	Monica Gunnarsson	Sweden (SWE)	46:08	
15	Debbi Lawrence	United States (USA)	46:13	
16	Sari Essayah	Finland (FIN)	46:20	
17	Pier Carola Pagani	Italy (ITA)	46:33	
18	Maricela Chávez	Mexico (MEX)	46:34	
19	Emilia Cano	Spain (ESP)	46:35	
20	Cui Yingzi	China (CHN)	46:36	
21	Betty Sworowski	Great Britain (GBR)	46:38	
22	Tina Poitras	Canada (CAN)	46:47	
23	Ildikó Ilyés	Hungary (HUN)	46:50	
24	Pascale Grand	Canada (CAN)	47:08	
25	Mária Rosza-Urbanik	Hungary (HUN)	47:25	
26	Yuko Sato	Japan (JPN)	47:26	
27	Victoria Herazo	United States (USA)	47:33	
28	Lynn Weik	United States (USA)	47:44	
29	Nathalie Marchand-Fortain	France (FRA)	47:46	
30	María Colín	Mexico (MEX)	47:50	
31	Olga Sánchez	Spain (ESP)	47:57	
32	Zuzana Zemková	Czechoslovakia (TCH)	47:58	
33	Lorraine Young-Jachno	Australia (AUS)	48:01	
34	Hideko Hirayama	Japan (JPN)	48:09	
35	Kathrin Born-Boyde	Germany (GER)	48:12	
36	Francisca Martínez	Mexico (MEX)	48:33	
37	Fusako Masuda	Japan (JPN)	48:25	
38	Maria Grazia Cogoli	Italy (ITA)	48:28	
39	Vicky Lupton	Great Britain (GBR)	48:57	
40	Valérie Lévèque-Nadaud	France (FRA)	48:58	
41	Holly Gerke	Canada (CAN)	49:05	
42	Wendy Sharpe	United States (USA)	49:08	
43	Helen Elleker	Great Britain (GBR)	49:12	
44	Ann Peel	Canada (CAN)	49:18	
45	Miriam Ramón	Ecuador (ECU)	49:27	
46	Natalie Camplin	Australia (AUS)	49:32	
47	Eva Machuca	Mexico (MEX)	49:47	
48	Ivana Brozmánová	Czechoslovakia (TCH)	48:49	
49	Kamila Holpuchová	Czechoslovakia (TCH)	50:06	
50	Elisabetta Perrone	Italy (ITA)	50:08	
51	Veronica Öqvist	Sweden (SWE)	50:09	
52	María Reyes Sobrino	Spain (ESP)	50:10	
53	Anikó Szebenszky	Hungary (HUN)	50:17	
54	Ibolya Varadi	Hungary (HUN)	50:23	
55	Takako Taura	Japan (JPN)	50:26	
56	Janice McCaffrey	Canada (CAN)	50:30	
57	Teresa Palacios	Spain (ESP)	50:36	
58	Mira Saastamoinen	Finland (FIN)	50:55	
59	Susan Orr-Cook	Australia (AUS)	51:29	
60	Julie Drake	Great Britain (GBR)	52:05	
61	Sandy Leddin	Germany (GER)	52:20	
62	Karianne Larsen	Norway (NOR)	52:28	
64	Ivana Henn	Brazil (BRA)	52:41	
65	Åslaug Mostad	Norway (NOR)	52:56	
66	Rosemar Piazza	Brazil (BRA)	53:20	
67	Bertha Vera	Ecuador (ECU)	53:50	
68	Renate Warz	Germany (GER)	54:15	
69	Helena Åström	Finland (FIN)	54:17	
70	Jane Jackson	New Zealand (NZL)	54:23	
71	Lynley Mathieson	New Zealand (NZL)	54:30	
72	Sharon Schnyder	Australia (AUS)	54:58	
73	Maria Vele	Ecuador (ECU)	55:03	
74	Ana Cortés	Ecuador (ECU)	55:24	
75	Sharon De Groot	New Zealand (NZL)	55:37	
76	Denise Volker	Brazil (BRA)	57:29	
77	Kavita Garari	India (IND)	58:14	
78	Anneli Kuukkanen	Finland (FIN)	58:49	
79	Maria Ambrocio	Guatemala (GUA)	59:49	
80	Chitra Choudhry	India (IND)	60:01	
81	Polly Nandi	India (IND)	62:17	
82	Olga Martínez	Guatemala (GUA)	63:03	
83	Reyna Gómez	Guatemala (GUA)	63:16	
—	Chen Yueling	China (CHN)	DQ	
—	Jin Bingyie	China (CHN)	DQ	
—	Alina Ivanova	Soviet Union (URS)	DQ	
—	Nadine Mazuir-Vavre	France (FRA)	DNF	
—	Andrea Mone	Ireland (IRL)	DNF	
—	Marie Walsh	Ireland (IRL)	DNF	
—	Kristin Andreassen	Norway (NOR)	DNF	
—	Teresa Vaill	United States (USA)	DNF	

=== Team (women) ===
Place	Country	Points
1st place, gold medalist(s)	Soviet Union	203 pts
2nd place, silver medalist(s)	Italy	180 pts
3rd place, bronze medalist(s)	Mexico	162 pts
4	Hungary	154 pts
5	Spain	153 pts
6	United States	143 pts
7	Sweden	141 pts
8	Australia	132 pts
9	Canada	128 pts
10	Germany	123 pts
11	Japan	117 pts
12	United Kingdom	115 pts
13	China	110 pts
14	Finland	97 pts
15	Czechoslovakia	94 pts
16	France	75 pts
17	Ecuador	62 pts
18	Brazil	52 pts
19	New Zealand	44 pts
20	Norway	43 pts
21	India	28 pts
22	Guatemala	23 pts
23	Ireland	22 pts

== Participation ==
The participation of 309 athletes (218 men/91 women) from 33 countries is reported.

- Algeria (4/-)
- Australia (10/5)
- Belgium (3/-)
- Brazil (8/3)
- Canada (5/5)
- China (6/4)
- Colombia (4/-)
- Czechoslovakia (9/3)
- Ecuador (-/4)
- Finland (7/4)
- France (10/3)
- Germany (10/4)
- Guatemala (8/3)
- Hungary (7/5)
- India (4/3)
- Ireland (3/3)
- Italy (10/5)
- Japan (5/4)
- Mexico (10/5)
- Netherlands (4/-)
- New Zealand (8/3)
- Norway (-/3)
- Poland (8/-)
- Portugal (7/-)
- Puerto Rico (3/-)
- Sierra Leone (5/-)
- Soviet Union (10/5)
- Spain (10/5)
- Sweden (8/3)
- Switzerland (8/-)
- United Kingdom (8/4)
- United States (10/5)
- Zambia (4/-)

== See also ==
- 1991 Race Walking Year Ranking
