= 3000 metres race walk =

Racewalking event

Athletics 3000 metres race walk

World records
- Men: (United Kingdom) Tom Bosworth 10:30.28 i (2018)
- Women: (Republic of Ireland) Gillian O'Sullivan 11:35.34 i (2003)

The 3000 metres race walk is a racewalking event. The event is competed as a track race. It was a part of the athletics programme for women at the IAAF World Indoor Championships in Athletics until 1993. In this event, athletes must always keep in contact with the ground and the supporting leg must remain straight until the raised leg passes it. 3000 meters is 1.86 miles.

The imperial equivalent of the 3000 m walk is the 2 miles race walk, which was contested at the USA Indoor Track and Field Championships until 1987. The distance has also been contested at racewalking events in Moscow.

== Records ==
IAAF just ratified world records for women's indoor marks. On January 30, 1999, Claudia Stef of Romania set the 3000 m race walk world indoor record in Bucharest in a time of 11:40.33. The all-time men's best 3000 m race-walk mark was also set indoors and is held by Tom Bosworth of the United Kingdom, at 10:30.28.

- Updated 21 May 2026.

Area	Time	Season	Athlete
World	11:40.33	1999	Claudia Ștef (ROU)
Area records
Africa (records)	14:13.46	2018	Tahani Ghazal (TUN)
Asia (records)	12:42.65	1994	Yuko Sato (JPN)
Europe (records)	11:40.33	1999	Claudia Ștef (ROU)
North, Central America and Caribbean (records)	12:20.79	1993	Debbi Lawrence (USA)
Oceania (records)	none		
South America (records)	13:24.0h	2023	Ángela Castro (BOL)

== All-time top 25 ==
- + = en route to 5000 m performance
- i = indoor performance
- h = hand timing
- A = affected by altitude

=== Men ===
- Correct as of June 2022.

Rank	Result	Athlete	Nationality	Date	Place	Ref.
1	10:30.28 i	Tom Bosworth	Great Britain	25 February 2018	Glasgow	
2	10:31.42 i	Andreas Erm	Germany	4 February 2001	Halle	
3	10:47.08	Lebogang Shange	South Africa	21 July 2018	London	
4	10:47.11	Giovanni De Benedictis	Italy	19 May 1990	San Giovanni Valdarno	
5	10:49.33 i	Christopher Linke	Germany	9 February 2018	Erfurt	
6	10:52.15 i	Nils Brembach	Germany	9 February 2018	Erfurt	
7	10:52.77 i	Callum Wilkinson	Great Britain	25 February 2018	Glasgow	
8	10:54.61 i	Carlo Mattioli	Italy	6 February 1980	Milan	
9	10:54.70	Dane Bird-Smith	Australia	11 February 2017	Brisbane	
10	10:56.22	Andrew Jachno	Australia	7 February 1991	Melbourne	
11	10:56.30 i	Marius Žiukas	Lithuania	25 February 2018	Glasgow	
12	10:56.34	Roman Mrázek	Czechoslovakia; Slovakia	14 Jun 1989	Bratislava	
13	10:56.77+ i	Ivano Brugnetti	Italy	21 Feb 2009	Turin	
14	10:56.88 i	Reima Salonen	Finland	5 February 1984	Turku	
15	10:57.32 i	Matej Tóth	Slovakia	12 February 2011	Vienna	
16	10:57.77	Francesco Fortunato	Italy	9 June 2022	Rome	
17	10:58.16	Kévin Campion	France	8 Jul 2014	Cork	
18	10:58.47	Alex Wright	Ireland	8 Jul 2014	Cork	
19	10:58.89 i	Dawid Tomala	Poland	25 February 2018	Glasgow	
20	10:59.04	Luke Adams	Australia	8 Jul 2014	Cork	
21	10:59.91	Gianluca Picchiottino	Italy	9 June 2022	Rome	
22	11:00.2 h	Jozef Pribilinec	Slovakia	30 August 1985	Banská Bystrica	
23	11:00.50+	Paquillo Fernández	Spain	8 June 2007	Villeneuve-d'Ascq	
24	11:00.56	David Smith	Australia	24 Jan 1987	Perth	
25	11:00.68	Antón Kučmín	Slovakia	21 August 2013	Dubnica nad Váhom	

==== Notes ====
Below is a list of other times equal or superior to 11:00.68:

- Tom Bosworth also walked 10:43.84 (2018), 10:58.21i (2016).
- Dane Bird-Smith also walked 10:56.06 (2018).
- Christopher Linke also walked 10:58.94 (2022).
- Callum Wilkinson also walked 10:59.00 (2019).

=== Women ===
- Correct as of February 2018.

Rank	Result	Athlete	Nationality	Date	Place	Ref.
1	11:35.34 i	Gillian O'Sullivan	Ireland	15 February 2003	Belfast	
2	11:40.33 i	Claudia Stef	Romania	30 January 1999	Bucharest	
3	11:41.85 i	Norica Câmpean	Romania	6 February 1999	Bucharest	
4	11:44.00 i	Alina Ivanova				
5	11:44.10 i	Anisya Kirdyapkina	Russia	5 February 2012	Moscow	
6	11:49.73 i	Yelena Nikolayeva				
7	11:50.08 i	Eleonora Giorgi				
8	11:50.30	Marina Pandakova	Russia	1 March 1989	Moscow	
9	11:50.48 i	Melanie Seeger				
10	11:50.90 i	Beate Gummelt				
11	11:51.26	Kerry Saxby-Junna				
12	11:52.38	Anežka Drahotová				
13	11:53.23 i	Ileana Salvador				
14	11:54.32 i	Anna Rita Sidoti				
15	11:55.30 i	Antonella Palmisano	Italy	17 February 2018	Ancona	
16	11:56.59 i	Irina Yumanova				
17	11:57.00 i	Elisa Rigaudo				
18	11:57.48 i	Yelena Arshintseva				
19	11:57.71 i	Svetlana Vasilyeva				
20	11:57.80	Erica Alfridi				
21	11:57.89 i	Marina Pandakova				
22	11:58.17	Elisabetta Perrone				
23	11:58.44 i	Vera Sokolova				
24	11:58.9 h	Yelena Gruzinova				
25	11:59.25	Olimpiada Ivanova				

==== Notes ====
Below is a list of other times equal or superior to 11:54.80:

- Claudia Stef also walked 11:40.99 (1999), 11:43.72 (1999).
- Alina Ivanova also walked 11:49.99 (1992).
- Beate Gummelt also walked 11:52.01 (1993), 11:53.03i (1996).
- Yelena Nikolayeva also walked hand-timed 11:54.8 (1992).
