= 1993 World Championships in Athletics – Women's 10 kilometres walk =

These are the official results of the Women's 10 km Walk event at the 1993 World Championships in Stuttgart, Germany. There were a total of 53 participating athletes, with the final held on Saturday August 14, 1993.

== Medalists ==
Gold	Sari Essayah; Finland (FIN)
Silver	Ileana Salvador; Italy (CHN)
Bronze	Encarna Granados; Spain (ESP)

== Final ranking ==
Rank	Athlete	Time	Note
1st place, gold medalist(s)	Sari Essayah (FIN)	42:59	
2nd place, silver medalist(s)	Ileana Salvador (ITA)	43:08	
3rd place, bronze medalist(s)	Encarna Granados (ESP)	43:21	
4	Elisabetta Perrone (ITA)	43:26	
5	Beate Anders (GER)	43:28	
6	Katarzyna Radtke (POL)	43:33	
7	Yelena Nikolayeva (RUS)	43:47	
8	Yelena Sayko (RUS)	43:56	
9	Annarita Sidoti (ITA)	44:13	
10	Mária Urbanik (HUN)	44:17	
11	Susana Feitor (POR)	45:06	
12	Yelena Arshintseva (RUS)	45:17	
13	Tatyana Ragozina (UKR)	45:24	
14	Andrea Alföldi (HUN)	45:57	
15	Kathrin Born-Boyde (GER)	46:11	
16	Miriam Ramón (ECU)	46:13	
17	Natalya Misyulya (BLR)	46:22	
18	Lisa Sheridan-Paolini (IRL)	46:31	
19	Yuko Sato (JPN)	46:41	
20	Ildikó Ilyés (HUN)	46:45	
21	Yuka Kamioka (JPN)	46:48	
22	Teresa Vaill (USA)	46:58	
23	Vicky Lupton (GBR)	47:03	
24	Alison Baker (CAN)	47:20	
25	Kamila Holpuchová (CZE)	47:24	
26	Yuliya Lisnik (MDA)	47:41	
27	Janice McCaffrey (CAN)	47:45	
28	María Colín (MEX)	47:51	
29	Verity Snook-Larby (GBR)	47:54	
30	Zuzana Zemkova (SVK)	47:56	
31	Sada Eidikyte-Buksniene (LTU)	48:03	
32	Liliana Bermeo (COL)	48:08	
33	Gabrielle Blythe (AUS)	48:23	
34	Tina Poitras (CAN)	48:24	
35	Simone Thust (GER)	48:38	
36	Hilde Gustavsen (NOR)	48:39	
37	Debbi Lawrence (USA)	48:53	
38	Kada Delić (BIH)	49:06	
39	Kjersti Plätzer (NOR)	49:06	
40	Maricela Chávez (MEX)	49:18	
41	Lynn Murphy (NZL)	49:24	
42	Julie Drake (GBR)	50:22	
43	Sara Standley (USA)	51:01	
44	Magdalena Guzmán (ESA)	51:01	
45	Dounia Kara (ALG)	51:33	
46	Hoon Helen Low Guan (SIN)	54:07	
47	Perri Williams (IRL)	55:24	
DID NOT FINISH (DNF)
—	Kerry Saxby-Junna (AUS)	DNF	
DISQUALIFIED (DSQ)
—	Wang Yan (CHN)	DSQ	
—	Madelein Svensson (SWE)	DSQ	
—	Eva Machuca (MEX)	DSQ	
—	Liu Hongyu (CHN)	DSQ	
DID NOT START (DNS)
—	Shushanik Dolmazyan (ARM)	DNS	

== See also ==
- 1990 Women's European Championships 10km Walk (Split)
- 1992 Women's Olympic 10km Walk (Barcelona)
- 1994 Men's European Championships 10km Walk (Helsinki)
