= Athletics at the 1989 Summer Universiade – Women's 5 kilometres walk =

The women's 5 kilometres walk event at the 1989 Summer Universiade was held in Duisburg on 29 August 1989. It was the last time that this distance was contested at the Universiade before being replaced with 10 kilometres in 1991.

== Results ==
Rank	Athlete	Nationality	Time	Notes
1st place, gold medalist(s)	Ileana Salvador	Italy	20:44	
2nd place, silver medalist(s)	Vera Makolova	Soviet Union	20:52	
3rd place, bronze medalist(s)	Sari Essayah	Finland	21:34	
4	Victoria Oprea	Romania	21:42	
5	Annarita Sidoti	Italy	21:44	
6	Alina Ivanova	Soviet Union	21:47	
7	Alison Baker	Canada	21:52	
8	Lynn Weik	United States	22:00	
9	Tamara Torshina	Soviet Union	22:05	
10	Lisa Langford	Great Britain	22:10	
11	Andrea Reitone	Hungary	22:24	
12	Sara Standley	United States	22:34	
13	Pascale Grand	Canada	22:37	
14	Anikó Szebenszky	Hungary	22:56	
15	Kalliopi Gavalaki	Greece	23:00	
16	Kristin Andreassen	Norway	23:05	
17	Beata Betlej	Poland	23:19	
18	Antonella Marangoni	Italy	23:28	
19	Anita Blomberg	Norway	23:35	
20	Carolyn Vanstan	Australia	24:01	
21	Celia Massie-Bertie	Australia	24:52	
