= 1991 World Championships in Athletics – Women's 10 kilometres walk =

These are the official results of the Women's 10 km Walk event at the 1991 World Championships in Tokyo, Japan. There were a total number of 42 participating athletes, with the final held on Saturday August 24, 1991, with the start at 10:25h local time.

== Medalists ==
Gold	Alina Ivanova; Soviet Union (URS)
Silver	Madelein Svensson; Sweden (SWE)
Bronze	Sari Essayah; Finland (FIN)

== Final ranking ==
Rank	Athlete	Time	Note
1st place, gold medalist(s)	Alina Ivanova (URS)	42:57	CR
2nd place, silver medalist(s)	Madelein Svensson (SWE)	43:13	
3rd place, bronze medalist(s)	Sari Essayah (FIN)	43:13	
4	Irina Strakhova (URS)	43:40	
5	Kerry Saxby-Junna (AUS)	44:02	
6	Graciela Mendoza (MEX)	44:03	
7	Ileana Salvador (ITA)	44:09	
8	Chen Yueling (CHN)	44:11	
9	Annarita Sidoti (ITA)	44:18	
10	Beate Gummelt (GER)	44:35	
11	Kathrin Born-Boyde (GER)	44:39	
12	Katarzyna Radtke (POL)	44:42	
13	Mária Urbanik (HUN)	45:00	
14	Andrea Alföldi (HUN)	45:22	
15	Mari Cruz Díaz (ESP)	45:23	
16	Emilia Cano (ESP)	45:32	
17	Susana Feitor (POR)	45:37	
18	Maricela Chávez (MEX)	45:54	
19	Debbi Lawrence (USA)	45:58	
20	Betty Sworowski (GBR)	45:59	
21	Pascale Grand (CAN)	46:17	
22	Sun Yan (CHN)	46:21	
23	Andrea Bruckmann (GER)	46:23	
24	Janice McCaffrey (CAN)	46:33	
25	Lynn Weik (USA)	46:49	
26	Ivana Brozmanová (TCH)	46:59	
27	Victoria Herazo (USA)	47:10	
28	Tina Poitras (CAN)	47:22	
29	Maria Reyes Sobrino (ESP)	47:31	
30	Yuko Sato (JPN)	47:37	
31	Zuzana Zemková (TCH)	47:41	
32	Kamila Holpuchová (TCH)	48:06	
33	María Colín (MEX)	48:47	
34	Viera Toporek (AUT)	48:31	
35	Hideko Hirayama (JPN)	48:35	
36	Isilda Gonçalves (POR)	48:35	
37	Fusako Masuda (JPN)	48:52	
38	Helen Elleker (GBR)	48:56	
39	Julie Drake (GBR)	49:47	
40	Hasiati Lawole (INA)	50:26	
41	Magdalena Guzman (ESA)	53:44	
DISQUALIFIED (DSQ)
—	Yelena Sayko (URS)	DSQ	

== See also ==
- 1987 Women's World Championships 10km Walk (Rome)
- 1990 Women's European Championships 10km Walk (Split)
- 1992 Women's Olympic 10km Walk (Barcelona)
- 1993 Women's World Championships 10km Walk (Stuttgart)
- 1994 Men's European Championships 10km Walk (Helsinki)
