= 1986 European Athletics Championships – Women's 10 kilometres walk =

Women's 10 kilometres walk at the European Athletics Championships

These are the official results of the Women's 10 km walk event at the 1986 European Championships in Stuttgart, West Germany, held on August 26, 1986.

== Medalists ==
Gold	Mari Cruz Díaz; Spain (ESP)
Silver	Ann Jansson; Sweden (SWE)
Bronze	Siv Vera Ybañez; Sweden (SWE)

== Abbreviations ==
- All times shown are in hours:minutes:seconds

DNS	did not start
NM	no mark
WR	world record
AR	area record
NR	national record
PB	personal best
SB	season best

== Records ==
Standing records prior to the 1986 European Athletics Championships
World Record	Yan Hong (CHN)	44.14	March 16, 1985	Jian, PR China
Event Record	New Event			
Broken records during the 1986 European Athletics Championships
Event Record	Mari Cruz Díaz (ESP)	46.09	August 26, 1986	Stuttgart, West Germany

== Final ranking ==
Rank	Athlete	Time	Note
1st place, gold medalist(s)	Mari Cruz Díaz (ESP)	46.09	
2nd place, silver medalist(s)	Ann Jansson (SWE)	46.14	
3rd place, bronze medalist(s)	Siv Vera Ybañez (SWE)	46.19	
4	Yelena Rodionova (URS)	46.28	
5	María Reyes Sobrino (ESP)	46.35	
6	Lidia Levandovskaya (URS)	46.36	
7	Aleksandra Grigoryeva (URS)	47.16	
8	Monica Gunnarsson (SWE)	47.24	
9	Dagmar Grimmenstein (GDR)	47.37	
10	Mirva Hämäläinen (FIN)	47.50	
11	Kjersti Tysse (NOR)	48.28	
12	Suzanne Griesbach (FRA)	48.32	
13	Dana Vavřačová (TCH)	48.46	
14	Lisa Langford (GBR)	49.21	
15	Beverley Allen (GBR)	49.50	
16	Sirkka Oikarinen (FIN)	50.23	
17	Gunhild Kristiansen (DEN)	50.50	
18	Mária Urbanik (HUN)	51.05	
19	Synnøve Olsen (NOR)	51.18	
20	Christine Tømmernes (NOR)	51.19	
21	Renate Warz (FRG)	51.41	
DISQUALIFIED (DSQ)
—	Ildikó Ilyés (HUN)	DSQ	
—	Helen Elleker (GBR)	DSQ	
—	Karin Jensen (DEN)	DSQ	

== Participation ==
According to an unofficial count, 24 athletes from 12 countries participated in the event.

- Czechoslovakia (1)
- Denmark (2)
- East Germany (1)
- Finland (2)
- France (1)
- Hungary (2)
- Norway (3)
- Soviet Union (3)
- Spain (2)
- Sweden (3)
- United Kingdom (3)
- West Germany (1)

== See also ==
- 1987 Women's World Championships 10km Walk (Rome)
- 1991 Women's World Championships 10km Walk (Tokyo)
- 1992 Women's Olympic 10km Walk (Barcelona)
