= 1994 European Athletics Championships – Women's 10 kilometres walk =

Women's 10 kilometres walk at the European Athletics Championships

These are the official results of the Women's 10 km walk event at the 1994 European Championships in Helsinki, Finland, held on 9 August 1994.

== Medalists ==
Gold	Sari Essayah; Finland (FIN)
Silver	Annarita Sidoti; Italy (ITA)
Bronze	Yelena Nikolayeva; Russia (RUS)

== Abbreviations ==
- All times shown are in hours:minutes:seconds

DNS	did not start
NM	no mark
WR	world record
AR	area record
NR	national record
PB	personal best
SB	season best

== Records ==
Standing records prior to the 1994 European Athletics Championships
World Record	Kerry Saxby-Junna (AUS)	41.30	August 27, 1988	Canberra, Australia
Event Record	Annarita Sidoti (ITA)	44.00	August 29, 1990	(Socialist Federal Republic of Yugoslavia) Split, SFR Yugoslavia
Broken records during the 1994 European Athletics Championships
Event Record	Sari Essayah (FIN)	42.37	August 9, 1994	Helsinki, Finland

== Results ==
Rank	Athlete	Time	Note
1st place, gold medalist(s)	Sari Essayah (FIN)	42:37	CR
2nd place, silver medalist(s)	Annarita Sidoti (ITA)	42:43	
3rd place, bronze medalist(s)	Yelena Nikolayeva (RUS)	42:43	
4	Yelena Arshintseva (RUS)	43:34	
5	Larisa Ramazanova (RUS)	43:25	
6	Nataliya Misyulya (BLR)	43:39	
7	Elisabetta Perrone (ITA)	43:47	
8	Susana Feitor (POR)	43:47	
9	Beate Gummelt (GER)	44:09	
10	Tatyana Ragozina (UKR)	44:15	
11	Ileana Salvador (ITA)	44:51	
12	Valentina Tsybulskaya (BLR)	45:06	
13	Emilia Cano (ESP)	45:14	
14	Mária Urbanik (HUN)	45:31	
15	Encarnacion Granados (ESP)	45:43	
16	Kjersti Tysse (NOR)	46:10	
17	Sonata Milušauskaitė (LTU)	46:17	
18	Valérie Nadaud (FRA)	46:23	
19	Simone Thust (GER)	46:26	
20	Vicky Lupton (GBR)	46:30	
21	Hanne Liland (NOR)	46:51	
22	Yuliya Lisnik (MDA)	47:20	
23	Verity Snook-Larby (GBR)	47:23	
24	Isilda Gonçalves (POR)	47:42	
25	Deirdre Gallagher (IRL)	48:50	
26	Kada Delić (BIH)	49:58	
27	Kaisa Suhonen (FIN)	50:51	
28	Mira Saastamoinen (FIN)	51:54	
DISQUALIFIED (DSQ)
—	Olga Leonenko (UKR)	DSQ	
—	Lisa Langford (GBR)	DSQ	
—	Norica Câmpean (ROM)	DSQ	
—	Katarzyna Radtke (POL)	DSQ	
—	Kathrin Born-Boyde (GER)	DSQ	

== Participation ==
According to an unofficial count, 33 athletes from 18 countries participated in the event.

- Belarus (2)
- Bosnia and Herzegovina (1)
- Finland (3)
- France (1)
- Germany (3)
- Hungary (1)
- Ireland (1)
- Italy (3)
- Lithuania (1)
- Moldova (1)
- Norway (2)
- Poland (1)
- Portugal (2)
- Romania (1)
- Russia (3)
- Spain (2)
- Ukraine (2)
- United Kingdom (3)

== See also ==
- 1987 Women's World Championships 10 km walk (Rome)
- 1991 Women's World Championships 10 km walk (Tokyo)
- 1992 Women's Olympic 10 km walk (Barcelona)
- 1993 Women's World Championships 10 km walk (Stuttgart)
- 1995 Women's World Championships 10 km walk (Gothenburg)
- 1996 Women's Olympic 10 km walk (Atlanta)
- 1997 Women's World Championships 10 km walk (Athens)
