= Martin St. Pierre =

Martin St. Pierre is the name of

- Martin St. Pierre (racewalker) (born 1972), Canadian racewalker
- Martin St. Pierre (ice hockey) (born 1983), Canadian ice hockey player
