= Maricela Chávez =

Mexican racewalker

Personal information
- Born: 24 September 1962 (age 63)

Sport
- Sport: Racewalking
Medal record
Representing Mexico
Pan American Games
Bronze medal – third place	1991 Havana	10km walk
Central American and Caribbean Games
Silver medal – second place	1990 Mexico City	10km walk

Maricela Aurora Chávez Reyes (born 24 September 1962) is a retired racewalker from Mexico. She set her personal best in the women's 10 km race walk event (44:10 min) on 23 May 1993 in Brandýs.

== Achievements ==
Year	Competition	Venue	Position	Notes
Representing Mexico
1989	Central American and Caribbean Championships	San Juan, Puerto Rico	2nd	10 km
1990	Central American and Caribbean Games	Mexico City, Mexico	2nd	10 km
1991	Pan American Games	Havana, Cuba	3rd	10 km
1991	World Race Walking Cup	San Jose, United States	18th	10 km
1991	World Championships	Tokyo, Japan	18th	10 km
1992	Olympic Games	Barcelona, Spain	28th	10 km
1993	World Championships	Stuttgart, Germany	40th	10 km
