= Kada Delić =

Bosnian race walker (born 1965)

Personal information
- Born: 10 July 1965 (age 61) Tuzla, PR Bosnia and Herzegovina, FPR Yugoslavia
- Height: 164 cm (65 in)
- Weight: 50 kg (110 lb)

Sport
- Country: Bosnia and Herzegovina
- Sport: Athletics
- Event: Race walking

Kada Delić-Selimović (born 10 July 1965) is a Bosnian former race walker. She competed at the 1992 and 1996 Summer Olympics for Bosnia and Herzegovina, finishing 38th each time. She also was the first woman to compete for Bosnia at the World Championships in Athletics in 1993 and also competed at the 1994 European Athletics Championships and the 1995 World Championships in Athletics. After her retirement in 1997, she became a coach.

== Biography ==
Delić was born on 10 July 1965 in Tuzla, Yugoslavia. From a Croat family, she grew up in the Kalesija and is one of four children. She initially competed in cross country running before switching to race walking, becoming one of the most successful race walkers in Yugoslavia. She was a member of the Yugoslavia national team and set national records in the 3,000 metres indoor, 3,000 metres outdoor, 5,000 metres and 10,000 metres. As of 2025, her times in these disciplines remain the national records for Bosnia and Herzegovina.

In 1992, during the Bosnian War, Delić's parents were both killed by grenades, as well as an uncle. She continued training, running through the area, but was nearly killed twice when shot at by Serb snipers. She was eventually selected for Bosnia's first Olympic team, to compete at the 1992 Summer Olympics in Barcelona, Spain. Delić participated in the 10 kilometres walk and finished in 38th place with a time of 55:24. She managed to finish the race despite competing injured, and her injuries worsened during the race, but she "gritted her teeth and held on to the end", according to Al Jazeera Balkans. She had her personal best in the 10 km event in 1992 outside of the Olympics, running the distance with a time of 46:52.

Delić's hometown was eventually destroyed during the war: she told the Houston Chronicle in 1993 that she no longer had a home: "Bombs, grenades, set on fire. It is gone". She had tried to continue training but was unable to due to snipers. She then escaped Bosnia to Turkey, where she trained in Istanbul starting in June 1993. After leaving for Turkey, she was unable to contact her surviving family members for two years. In August 1993, Delić participated at the 1993 World Championships in Athletics in the 10 km walk, finishing 38th. She was the only Bosnian participant at the 1993 championships and was the first woman to represent the country there. The following year, she participated at the 1994 European Athletics Championships, finishing 26th. She returned to the World Championships in 1995, finishing 38th. She competed at the 1996 Summer Olympics in Atlanta, U.S., finishing 38th, before retiring in 1997.

After retiring, Delić became a coach. She was named director of Athletics Club Sloboda – Tenograd in 1998. She coached the Bosnian women's athletics team at the 2000 and 2004 Summer Olympics and became involved in the Special Olympics in 2007, later serving as the executive director of Special Olympics Bosnia and Herzegovina. She received the Female Leader in Athletics award from the European Athletics Association (EAA) in 2013 and received an award as the best female athletics coach in Europe in 2022. She is also a professor at the Pan-European University in the faculty of sports sciences, teaching athletics and strategic management and sports and recreation for those with special needs.

== Achievements ==
Year	Competition	Venue	Position	Event	Notes
Representing Bosnia and Herzegovina
1992	Olympic Games	Barcelona, Spain	38th	10 km	55:24
1993	World Championships	Stuttgart, Germany	38th	10 km	49:06
1994	European Championships	Helsinki, Finland	26th	10 km	49:58
1995	World Championships	Gothenburg, Sweden	38th	10 km	47:43
1996	Olympic Games	Atlanta, United States	38th	10 km	48:47
