= Athletics at the 1992 Summer Olympics – Women's 10 kilometres walk =

Women's 10 kilometres walk at the Games of the XXV Olympiad
- Venue: Olympic Stadium
- Dates: August 3
- Competitors: 44 from 20 nations
- Winning time: 44:32 OR

Medalists
1st place, gold medalist(s)		Chen Yueling; China
2nd place, silver medalist(s)		Yelena Nikolayeva; Unified Team
3rd place, bronze medalist(s)		Li Chunxiu; China

The Women's 10 km Walk at the 1992 Summer Olympics was held on August 3, 1992, in Barcelona, Spain. There were a total number of 44 competitors, with six athletes who were disqualified.

Inside the stadium, Alina Ivanova of the Unified Team and Chen Yueling of China were locked in a tight battle. With 200 metres to go, Ivanova accelerated, and began sprinting for what looked like would be a gold/bronze combination for the former Soviet athletes as Chen maintained her pace to stay ahead of Yelena Nikolayeva and Chen's teammate Li Chunxiu.

Ivanova crossed the finish line in first, but her final sprint saw her confronted by officials and disqualified as replays showed conclusively both her feet off the ground during this burst; in the midst of this, Ileana Salvador of Italy sprinted past Li at the line, and she too was disqualified.

This gave Chen the gold medal and Li the bronze, while Chen also took the inaugural Olympic record.

== Medalists ==
Gold	Chen Yueling; China
Silver	Yelena Nikolayeva; Unified Team
Bronze	Li Chunxiu; China

== Abbreviations ==
- All times shown are in hours:minutes:seconds

DNS	did not start
NM	no mark
OR	olympic record
WR	world record
AR	area record
NR	national record
PB	personal best
SB	season best

== Records ==
Standing records prior to the 1992 Summer Olympics
World Record	Kerry Saxby-Junna (AUS)	41:30	August 27, 1988	Canberra, Australia
Olympic Record	New Event			
Broken records at the 1992 Summer Olympics
Olympic Record	Chen Yueling (CHN)	44:32	August 3, 1992	Barcelona, Spain

== Final ranking ==
Rank	Athlete	Time	Note
1st place, gold medalist(s)	Chen Yueling (CHN)	44:32	OR
2nd place, silver medalist(s)	Yelena Nikolayeva (EUN)	44:33	
3rd place, bronze medalist(s)	Li Chunxiu (CHN)	44:41	
4	Sari Essayah (FIN)	45:08	
5	Cui Yingzi (CHN)	45:15	
6	Madelein Svensson (SWE)	45:17	
7	Annarita Sidoti (ITA)	45:23	
8	Yelena Sayko (EUN)	45:23	
9	Anne Judkins (NZL)	45:28	
10	Mari Cruz Díaz (ESP)	45:32	
11	Katarzyna Radtke (POL)	45:45	
12	Mária Urbanik (HUN)	45:50	
13	Ildikó Ilyés (HUN)	45:54	
14	Encarna Granados (ESP)	46:00	
15	Kerry Saxby-Junna (AUS)	46:01	
16	Beate Anders (GER)	46:31	
17	Beata Kaczmarska (POL)	46:34	
18	Andrea Alföldi (HUN)	46:35	
19	Elisabetta Perrone (ITA)	46:43	
20	Michelle Rohl (USA)	46:45	
21	Tina Poitras (CAN)	46:50	
22	Emilia Cano (ESP)	47:03	
23	Miki Itakura (JPN)	47:11	
24	Yuko Sato (JPN)	47:43	
25	Janice McCaffrey (CAN)	48:05	
26	Debbi Lawrence (USA)	48:23	
27	Victoria Herazo (USA)	48:26	
28	Maricela Chávez (MEX)	48:39	
29	Pascale Grand (CAN)	49:14	
30	Eva Machuca (MEX)	50:02	
31	Gabrielle Blythe (AUS)	50:13	
32	Betty Sworowski (GBR)	50:14	
33	Kathrin Born-Boyde (GER)	50:21	
34	Isilda Gonçalves (POR)	50:23	
35	Lisa Langford (GBR)	51:44	
36	Miriam Ramón (ECU)	51:56	
37	Perri Williams (IRL)	54:53	
38	Kada Delić (BIH)	55:24	
DISQUALIFIED (DSQ)
—	Alina Ivanova (EUN)	DSQ	
—	Ileana Salvador (ITA)	DSQ	
—	Susana Feitor (POR)	DSQ	
—	Graciela Mendoza (MEX)	DSQ	
—	Vicky Lupton (GBR)	DSQ	
—	Ma Kyin Lwan (MYA)	DSQ	

== See also ==
- 1987 Women's World Championships 10km Walk (Rome)
- 1990 Women's European Championships 10km Walk (Split)
- 1991 Women's World Championships 10km Walk (Tokyo)
- 1992 Race Walking Year Ranking
- 1993 Women's World Championships 10km Walk (Stuttgart)
- 1994 Women's European Championships 10km Walk (Helsinki)
