= Ricky Cooke =

Australian racewalker

Ricky Cooke (born 9 August 1969) is a retired male race walker from Australia. He competed in the 50km walk at the 1991 IAAF World Race Walking Cup. Cooke finished 58th in a time of 4:28:15. He was the first Tasmanian to be selected in an Australian senior walk team.
