= Lisa Kehler =

English race walker (born 1967)

Lisa Kehler née Langford
Personal information
- Nationality: British (English)
- Born: 15 March 1967 (age 59) Wednesfield, England
- Height: 168 cm (5 ft 6 in)
- Weight: 47 kg (104 lb)

Sport
- Sport: Athletics
- Event: race walk
- Club: Wolverhampton & Bilston Athletics Club
Medal record
Athletics
Representing England
Commonwealth Games
Bronze medal – third place	1990 Auckland	10 km walk
Bronze medal – third place	1998 Kuala Lumpur	10 km walk
Silver medal – second place	2002 Manchester	20 km walk

Lisa Martine Kehler (née Langford; born 15 March 1967) is an English retired race walker.

== Biography ==
Born in Wednesfield, Staffordshire, she competes for the Wolverhampton & Bilston Athletics Club. Kehler competed for Great Britain at the Olympic Games in 1992 and 2000.

She competed in five Commonwealth Games; she represented England and won a bronze medal in the 10 km event, at the 1990 Commonwealth Games in Auckland, New Zealand. Four years later she represented England again in the 10 km event, at the 1994 Commonwealth Games in Victoria, Canada. The third Games appearance was when she represented England in the 10 km event and she won a bronze medal, at the 1998 Commonwealth Games in Kuala Lumpur, Malaysia. A fourth medal (silver) came at the 2002 Commonwealth Games in Manchester and a fifth and final appearance ensued in 2010.

She was twice British 10km walk champion after winning the British AAA Championships title at the 1989 AAA Championships and 2000 AAA Championships and four-times British 5km walk champion in 1987, 1995, 2002 and 2003.

== International competitions ==
Year	Competition	Venue	Position	Event	Notes
Representing Great Britain and England
1986	European Championships	Stuttgart, West Germany	14th	10 km	49.21
1987	World Race Walking Cup	New York City, United States	11th	10 km	45:42
1987	World Championships	Rome, Italy	13th	10 km	46:23
1988	European Indoor Championships	Budapest, Hungary	12th	3000 m	13:32.30
1989	World Race Walking Cup	L'Hospitalet de Llobregat, Spain	15th	10 km	46:02
1989	Universiade	Duisburg, West Germany	10th	5 km	22:10
1990	Commonwealth Games	Auckland, New Zealand	3rd	10 km	47:23
1990	European Championships	Split, Yugoslavia	10th	10 km	46.33
1992	Olympic Games	Barcelona, Spain	35th	10 km	51:44
1994	European Championships	Helsinki, Finland	—	10 km	DQ
1994	Commonwealth Games	Victoria, Canada	6th	10 km	46:01
1995	World Championships	Gothenburg, Sweden	35th	10 km	46:06
1998	European Championships	Budapest, Hungary	18th	10 km	45:42
1998	Commonwealth Games	Kuala Lumpur, Malaysia	3rd	10 km	45:03
2000	Olympic Games	Sydney, Australia	33rd	20 km	1:37:47
2002	Commonwealth Games	Manchester, United Kingdom	2nd	20 km	1:36:45
2002	World Race Walking Cup	Turin, Italy	—	20 km	DQ
2010	Commonwealth Games	Delhi, India	4th	20 km	1:40.33
2011	European Race Walking Cup	Olhão, Portugal	44th	20 km	1:47:58
