= Beata Kaczmarska =

Polish racewalker

Beata Kaczmarska (born 5 July 1970 in Warsaw, Mazowieckie) is a former female racewalker from Poland, who represented her native country at the 1992 Summer Olympics in Barcelona, Spain. She set her personal best (44:07) in the women's 10 km walk event in 1992.

== Achievements ==
| Year | Competition | Venue | Position | Notes |
Representing Poland
| 1992 | Olympic Games | Barcelona, Spain | 17th | 10 km |
| 1993 | World Race Walking Cup | Monterrey, Mexico | 17th | 10 km |
