= Yulia Lisnik =

Moldovan racewalker

Yulia Lisnik (born 1 August 1966) is a retired Moldovan race walker.

She finished 26th at the 1993 World Championships and 22nd at the 1994 European Championships, both times in the 10 kilometre distance.

== Achievements ==
Year	Competition	Venue	Position	Event	Notes
Representing Moldova
1994	European Championships	Helsinki, Finland	22nd	10 km	47:20
