= Chen Shaoguo =

Chinese racewalker (born 1971)

Medal record

Men's athletics

Representing China

Asian Championships
Gold medal – first place	1993 Manila	20 km walk

Chen Shaoguo (simplified Chinese: 陈绍果; traditional Chinese: 陳紹果; pinyin: Chén Shàoguǒ; born January 20, 1971) is a retired male race walker from PR China. He competed for his native country at the 1992 Summer Olympics in Barcelona, Spain.

== Achievements ==
Year	Competition	Venue	Position	Notes
Representing China
1992	Olympic Games	Barcelona, Spain	5th	20 km
1993	World Race Walking Cup	Monterrey, Mexico	20th	20 km
1993	Asian Championships	Manila, Philippines	1st	20 km
1994	Asian Games	Hiroshima, Japan	1st	20 km
1995	World Race Walking Cup	Beijing, PR China	6th	20 km
1995	World Championships	Gothenburg, Sweden	23rd	20 km
