= Long Yuwen =

Chinese racewalker

Personal information
- Born: August 19, 1975 (age 51) Qingdao, China

Sport
- Sport: Race walking
Medal record
Representing China
Summer Universiade
| Gold medal – first place | 1993 Buffalo | 10km walk |

Long Yuwen (born August 19, 1975) is a retired female race walker from PR China.

== Achievements ==
| Year | Competition | Venue | Position | Notes |
Representing China
| 1993 | World Race Walking Cup | Monterrey, Mexico | 9th | 10 km |
| 1993 | World Student Games | Buffalo, United States | 1st | 10 km |
