= Yelena Nikolayeva (race walker) =

Russian race walker

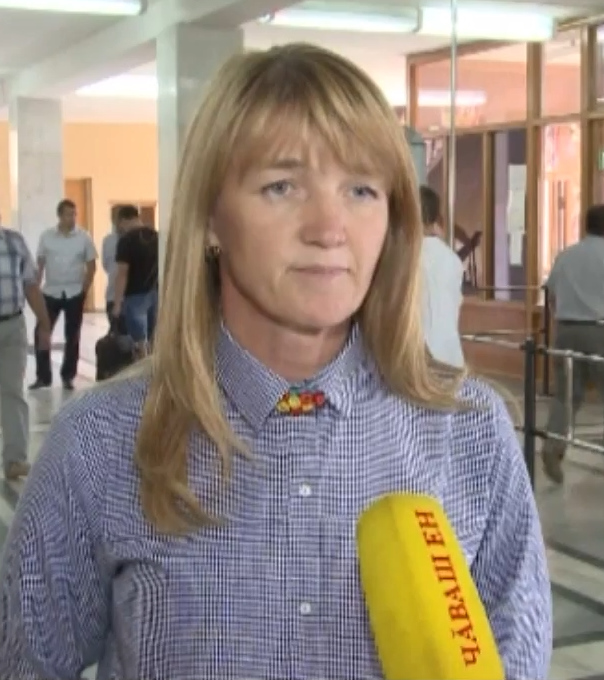
- Nikolayeva in 2016

Medal record

Women's athletics

Representing Russia

Olympic Games
Gold medal – first place	1996 Atlanta	10 km walk
Silver medal – second place	1992 Barcelona	10 km walk

World Championships
Gold medal – first place	2003 Paris	20 km walk
Bronze medal – third place	1995 Gothenburg	10 km walk

European Championships
Bronze medal – third place	1994 Helsinki	10 km walk

Yelena Nikolayevna Nikolayeva (Russian: Елена Николаевна Николаева, born 1 February 1966 in Akshiki, Chuvashia) is a Russian race walker.

Her first international achievement was a fifth place at the 1987 World Championships, something which happened again at the 1991 World Indoor Championships. One year later she won an Olympic silver medal behind Chen Yueling. Success followed over the next years, and in 1996 she became the second and last Olympic champion in the 10 kilometres distance, which was replaced by 20 km. Proving to handle the longer distance as well, she won the title at the 2003 World Championships in Paris.

== International competitions ==
Year	Competition	Venue	Position	Event	Result	Notes
Representing the Soviet Union
1987	World Race Walking Cup	New York City, United States	5th	10 km	43:57	
1987	World Championships	Rome, Italy	5th	10 km	44:54	
1991	World Indoor Championships	Seville, Spain	5th	3000 m	12:09.60	
Representing Unified Team
1992	Olympic Games	Barcelona, Spain	2nd	10 km	44:33	
Representing Russia
1993	World Indoor Championships	Toronto, Canada	1st	3000 m	11:49.73	
1993	World Championships	Stuttgart, Germany	7th	10 km	43:47	
1993	World Race Walking Cup	Monterrey, Mexico	3rd	10 km	45:22	
1994	European Indoor Championships	Paris, France	4th	3000 m	11:57.49	
1994	European Championships	Helsinki, Finland	3rd	10 km	42:43	
1995	World Race Walking Cup	Beijing, China	2nd	10 km	42:32	
1995	World Championships	Gothenburg, Sweden	3rd	10 km	42:20	
1996	Olympic Games	Atlanta, United States	1st	10 km	41:49	
1997	World Championships	Athens, Greece	9th	10,000 m	45:01.90	
1999	World Race Walking Cup	Mézidon-Canon, France	4th	20 km	1:28:23	
1999	World Championships	Seville, Spain	12th	20 km	1:34:10	
2001	European Race Walking Cup	Dudince, Slovakia	5th	20 km	1:28:20	
2001	World Championships	Edmonton, Canada	—	20 km	DQ	Lifting
2002	European Championships	Munich, Germany	2nd	20 km	1:28:20	
2002	World Race Walking Cup	Turin, Italy	4th	20 km	1:29:12	
2003	European Race Walking Cup	Cheboksary, Russia	1st	20 km	1:26:22	
2003	World Championships	Paris, France	1st	20 km	1:26:52	
2004	World Race Walking Cup	Naumburg, Germany	1st	20 km	1:27:24	
2004	Olympic Games	Athens, Greece	17th	20 km	1:32:16	

Records
Preceded by Larisa Ramazanova	Women's 10km Walk World Record Holder; 20 April 1996 – present	Succeeded by Incumbent
