= Li Chunxiu =

Chinese race walker (born 1969)

Medal record

Women's Athletics

Representing China

Olympic Games
Bronze medal – third place	1992 Barcelona	10 km walk

Asian Championships
Silver medal – second place	1993 Manila	10 km walk

Li Chunxiu (Chinese: 李春秀; born August 13, 1969) is a Chinese race walker, who won the bronze medal over 10 km at the 1992 Summer Olympics in Barcelona.

She also won the 1993 East Asian Games and finished second at the Asian Championships the same year.
