= Emilia Cano =

Spanish racewalker (born 1968)

Emilia Cano Camacho (born March 4, 1968, in Barcelona) is a retired female race walker from Spain.

== International competitions ==
Year	Competition	Venue	Position	Event	Notes
Representing Spain
1986	World Junior Championships	Athens, Greece	6th	5000 m	23:18.05
1987	European Indoor Championships	Liévin, France	5th	3000 m	13:23.96
1987	World Indoor Championships	Indianapolis, United States	5th	3000 m	13:02.41
1987	World Race Walking Cup	New York City, United States	19th	10 km	46:50
1987	World Championships	Rome, Italy	29th	10 km	50:11
1988	European Indoor Championships	Budapest, Hungary	13th	3000 m	13:37.03
1990	European Championships	Split, Yugoslavia	11th	10 km	46.43
1990	Ibero-American Championships	Manaus, Brazil	2nd	10,000 m	48:14.63
1991	World Indoor Championships	Seville, Spain	6th	3000 m	12:40.87
1991	World Race Walking Cup	San Jose, United States	19th	10 km	46:35
1991	World Championships	Tokyo, Japan	16th	10 km	45:32
1992	Olympic Games	Barcelona, Spain	22nd	10 km	47:03
1994	European Championships	Helsinki, Finland	13th	10 km	45:14
