= Isilda Gonçalves =

Portuguese racewalker

Isilda Maria de Jesus Veloso Gonçalves (born 11 November 1969) is a retired female race walker from Portugal.

== Achievements ==
Year	Competition	Venue	Position	Event	Notes
Representing Portugal
1990	European Championships	Split, Yugoslavia	21st	10 km	50:49
1991	World Championships	Tokyo, Japan	36th	10 km	48:35
1992	Olympic Games	Barcelona, Spain	34th	10 km	50:23
1994	European Championships	Helsinki, Finland	24th	10 km	47:42
1997	World Race Walking Cup	Poděbrady, Czech Republic	62nd	10 km	47:23
1999	World Race Walking Cup	Mézidon-Canon, France	66th	20 km	1:40:42
2000	European Race Walking Cup	Eisenhüttenstadt, Germany	45th	20 km	1:42:07
2001	European Race Walking Cup	Dudince, Slovakia	27th	20 km	1:36:54
