= Alison Baker (race walker) =

Canadian racewalker (born 1964)

Personal information
- Born: August 6, 1964 (age 61) Scarborough, Ontario, Canada

Sport
- Country: Canada
- Sport: Athletics
- Event: Racewalking
- Updated on 27 July 2013

Alison Baker (born August 6, 1964) is a retired female racewalker from Canada. She set her personal best in the women's 10 km race walk event (47:20) at the 1993 World Championships.

== Achievements ==
Year	Competition	Venue	Position	Event	Notes
Representing Canada
1984	Pan American Race Walking Cup	Bucaramanga, Colombia	4th	10 km	51:10
1986	Pan American Race Walking Cup	Saint Léonard, Canada	8th	10 km	49:04
1987	World Championships	Rome, Italy	21st	10 km	47:48
1988	Pan American Race Walking Cup	Mar del Plata, Argentina	5th	10 km	47:17
1989	Universiade	Duisburg, West Germany	7th	5 km	21:52
1990	Commonwealth Games	Auckland, New Zealand	8th	10 km	50:54
1993	World Championships	Stuttgart, Germany	24th	10 km	47:20
1994	Jeux de la Francophonie	Bondoufle, France	4th	10,000 m	48:09.88
1994	Commonwealth Games	Victoria, British Columbia, Canada	12th	10 km	51:28
