= Sari Essayah =

Finnish racewalker and politician (born 1967)

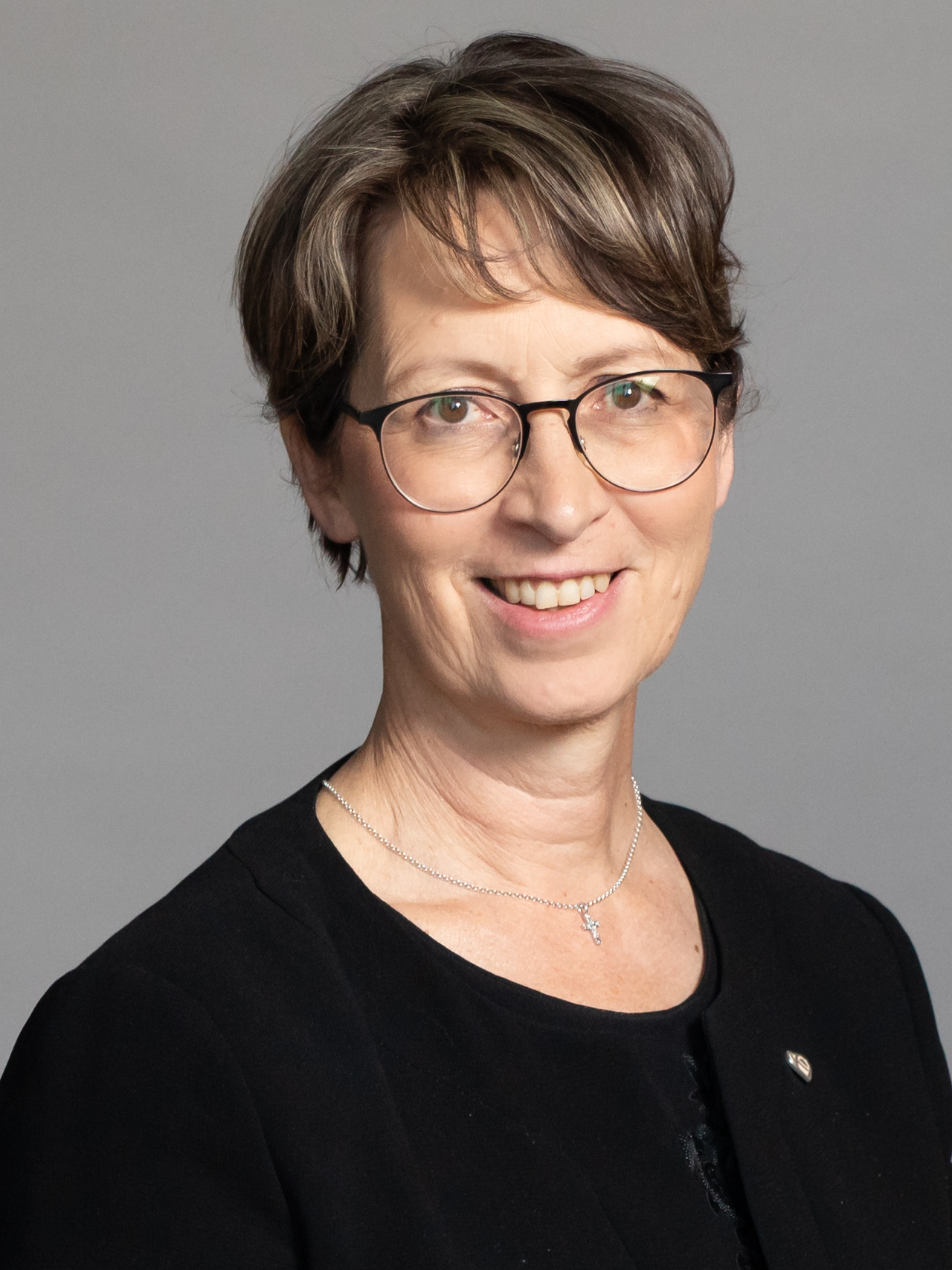
- Essayah in 2023

Minister of Agriculture and Forestry
- Incumbent
- Assumed office 20 June 2023
- Prime Minister: Petteri Orpo
- Preceded by: Antti Kurvinen

Leader of the Christian Democrats
- Incumbent
- Assumed office 28 August 2015
- Preceded by: Päivi Räsänen

Member of the Parliament of Finland
- Incumbent
- Assumed office 28 April 2015
- In office 19 March 2003 – 20 March 2007

Member of the European Parliament
- In office 1 July 2009 – 1 July 2014

Personal details
- Born: 21 February 1967 (age 59) Haukivuori, Finland
- Party: Christian Democrats
- Spouse: Robert Knapp
- Children: 2
- Sports career
- Sport: Athletics
- Event: Race walking
Medal record
Women's athletics
Representing Finland
World Championships
Bronze medal – third place	1991 Tokyo	10 km walk
Gold medal – first place	1993 Stuttgart	10 km walk
European Championships
Gold medal – first place	1994 Helsinki	10 km walk
World Race Walking Cup
Silver medal – second place	1993 Monterrey	10 km walk
Universiade
Bronze medal – third place	1989 Duisburg	5 km walk
Gold medal – first place	1991 Sheffield	10 km walk

Sari Miriam Essayah (born 21 February 1967) is a Finnish retired racewalker and a politician, former Member of the European Parliament (MEP) and Member of Parliament since 2015. She is the president of the Finnish Christian Democrats party. She has been serving as Minister of Agriculture and Forestry since 2023.

During her sports career, Essayah competed mainly in 5 and 10 kilometres. In the latter, she won the World Championship in 1993 and the European Championship in 1994. She set seven national records, all of which are still standing.

In 2016, Essayah became a member of the International Olympic Committee (IOC), and she has been a member of the Ethics Committee of the Finnish Athletics Association since 2014.

== Education ==
Her father is from Morocco.

Essayah holds an M.Sc (Econ) in business administration and accounting from the University of Vaasa.

== Political career ==
After retiring from sports Essayah entered politics and represented the Christian Democrats in the Finnish parliament between 2003 and 2007 but failed to get reelected in the election of 2007. She served as the Christian Democrats' party secretary from 2007 to 2009. Essayah was elected to the European Parliament in 2009 but failed to be reelected in 2014 despite her 61 000 votes. This left the Finnish Christian Democrats without MEPs in the 2014 election. In November 2011 she undertook godparenthood for Mikola Dziadok, Belarusian activist and political prisoner.

Essayah was candidate in the 2012 Finnish presidential election. She came last with 2.47 percent of the votes.

In the 2015 parliamentary elections, Essayah was elected to represent a newly formed constituency of Savonia and Karelia with over 11 000 votes. She was later chosen to be the vice speaker of the Christian Democrats' Parliamentary group. In August, she was chosen as the new chair of her party after her predecessor, Päivi Räsänen, retired from the position after over ten years. Sari Essayah was re-elected in Finnish parliament in the 2019 elections and re-elected for a third term as the party chair in a party congress in August.

In June 2023, she was appointed Minister of Agriculture and Forestry in the Orpo Cabinet. On 27 August 2023, Essayah was chosen as the presidential candidate of Christian Democrats in the 2024 Finnish presidential election. She received 1.48% of the total votes.

== Other activities ==
- Finnish Institute of International Affairs (FIIA), Member of the Advisory Council (since 2019)

== Achievements ==
Year	Competition	Venue	Position	Event	Notes
Representing Finland
1987	World Championships	Rome, Italy	19th	10 km	47:30
1989	Universiade	Duisburg, West Germany	3rd	5 km	21:34
1990	European Championships	Split, Yugoslavia	5th	10 km	45:10
1991	World Race Walking Cup	San Jose, United States	16th	10 km	46:20
1991	Universiade	Sheffield, England	1st	10 km	44:04
1991	World Championships	Tokyo, Japan	3rd	10 km	43:13
1992	Olympic Games	Barcelona, Spain	4th	10 km	45:08
1993	World Race Walking Cup	Monterrey, Mexico	2nd	10 km	45:18
1993	World Championships	Stuttgart, Germany	1st	10 km	42:59
1994	European Championships	Helsinki, Finland	1st	10 km	42:37
1995	World Race Walking Cup	Beijing, China	12th	10 km	44:21
1995	World Championships	Gothenburg, Sweden	4th	10 km	42:20
1996	Olympic Games	Atlanta, United States	16th	10 km	45:02

Party political offices
Preceded by Päivi Räsänen	Leader of the Christian Democrats; 2015–	Incumbent
Preceded by Annika Kokko	Secretary General of the Christian Democrats; 2007–2009	Succeeded by Peter Östman
