= Perri Williams =

Irish racewalker

Personal information
- Nationality: Irish
- Born: 21 June 1956 (age 70)

Sport
- Sport: Athletics
- Event: Racewalking

Perri Williams (born 21 June 1956) is an Irish racewalker. She competed in the women's 10 kilometres walk at the 1992 Summer Olympics.
