= Kathrin Born-Boyde =

German racewalker

Kathrin Born-Boyde (born 4 December 1970 in Naumburg, Bezirk Halle) is a retired female race walker from Germany. She competed in three consecutive Summer Olympics for her native country: 1992, 1996 and 2000.

== Achievements ==
Year	Competition	Venue	Position	Event	Notes
Representing Germany
1991	World Championships	Tokyo, Japan	11th	10 km	44:39
1992	Olympic Games	Barcelona, Spain	33rd	10 km	50:21
1993	World Championships	Stuttgart, Germany	15th	10 km	46:11
1994	European Championships	Helsinki, Finland	—	10 km	DQ
1995	World Championships	Gothenburg, Sweden	—	10 km	DQ
1996	Olympic Games	Atlanta, United States	15th	10 km	44:50
1998	European Championships	Budapest, Hungary	—	10 km	DQ
2000	Olympic Games	Sydney, Australia	—	20 km	DNF
2001	European Race Walking Cup	Dudince, Slovakia	—	20 km	DNF
