= Chen Yueling =

American race walker

Personal information
- Born: December 24, 1969 (age 56) Liaoning, China

Sport
- Sport: Race walking
Medal record
Representing China
Olympic Games
Gold medal – first place	1992 Barcelona	10 km walk
Asian Championships
Gold medal – first place	1989 New Delhi	10 km walk
Summer Universiade
Silver medal – second place	1991 Sheffield	10 km walk
Asian Games
Gold medal – first place	1990 Beijing	10 km walk

Chen Yueling (simplified Chinese: 陈跃玲; traditional Chinese: 陳躍玲; pinyin: Chén Yuèlíng; born December 24, 1969 (also reported as April 1, 1968) is now an American race walker, who became the first ever female Olympic Race walking champion in 1992 while competing for China. She was virtually tied with former Soviet, Unified Team member Alina Ivanova with 200 meters to go. Ivanova then accelerated past Chen to the finish, while Chen held form. After a short celebration, Ivanova earned a disqualification, while Chen was awarded her gold medal.

Chen was born in Liaoning, China. She had done mountain climbing and long-distance running before she started training at the Tieling Sports School in 1985. Spotted by Chinese walking coach Wang Kui, she joined the Liaoning provincial walking team. In 1989 she won the Asian Championships in New Delhi.

She also won the 1990 Asian Games and took silver at the 1991 Universiade. She left China for the United States in 1994.

She competed for her new country at the 2000 Olympics, finishing 38th.

She has been active in charitable activities in the United States and has done professional modeling. As of 2001, she was employed as Director of Asian Marketing for the health and nutritional company, Imagenetix, Inc.

== Achievements ==
Year	Competition	Venue	Position	Notes
Representing China
1989	Asian Championships	New Delhi, India	1st	48:59.86
1989	World Race Walking Cup	L'Hospitalet, Spain	5th	44:24
1990	Asian Games	Beijing, China	1st	44:47
1991	Universiade	Sheffield, United Kingdom	2nd	44:33
1991	World Championships	Tokyo, Japan	8th	44:11
1992	Olympic Games	Barcelona, Spain	1st	44:32
Representing United States
2000	Olympic Games	Sydney, Australia	38th	1:39:36
