= Yelena Sayko =

Russian racewalker

Personal information
- Born: December 24, 1967 (age 58) Chelyabinsk, Soviet Union

Sport
- Sport: Race walking

Yelena Valentinovna Sayko (born December 24, 1967) is a retired female race walker from Russia, who competed for the Unified Team at the 1992 Summer Olympics in Barcelona, Spain. She set her personal best (41.56) in the women's 10 km event in 1996.

== Achievements ==
Year	Competition	Venue	Position	Event	Notes
Representing Unified Team
1991	World Race Walking Cup	San Jose, United States	3rd	10 km	44:11
1991	World Championships	Tokyo, Japan	DSQ	10 km	—
1992	Olympic Games	Barcelona, Spain	8th	10 km	45:23
Representing Russia
1993	World Championships	Stuttgart, Germany	8th	10 km	43:56
1997	World Race Walking Cup	Poděbrady, Czech Republic	16th	10 km	43:20
