= Gabrielle Blythe =

Australian racewalker

Personal information
- Full name: Gabrielle Therese Blythe
- Nationality: Australian
- Born: 9 March 1969 (age 57)

Sport
- Sport: Athletics
- Event: Racewalking

Gabrielle Therese Blythe (born 9 March 1969) is an Australian racewalker. She competed in the women's 10 kilometres walk at the 1992 Summer Olympics.
