= Debbi Lawrence =

American racewalker

Personal information
- Full name: Deborah Ann Lawrence
- Nickname: Debbi
- Born: Deborah Ann Spino; October 15, 1961 (age 64) Columbus, Indiana, U.S.
- Height: 1.73 m (5 ft 8 in)
- Weight: 59 kg (130 lb)
- Spouse: Don Lawrence

Sport
- Country: United States
- Sport: Athletics
- Event: Racewalking
Medal record
Representing United States
Pan American Games
| Silver medal – second place | 1991 Havana | 10km walk |
- Updated on 10 October 2014

Deborah "Debbi" Ann Lawrence (née Spino, born October 15, 1961) is a retired racewalker from the United States. She set her personal best in the women's 10 km race walk event (45:03) at the 1995 World Championships in Athletics in Gothenburg, Sweden.

== Personal bests ==
- 10 km: 44:42 min – 1992
- 20 km: 1:33:48 hrs – Sacramento, United States, 16 July 2000

== Achievements ==
| Year | Competition | Venue | Position | Event | Notes |
Representing the United States
| 1986 | Pan American Race Walking Cup | Saint Léonard, Canada | 9th | 10 km | 49:05 |
| 1987 | World Championships | Rome, Italy | 20th | 10 km | 48:53 |
| 1988 | Pan American Race Walking Cup | Mar del Plata, Argentina | 3rd | 10 km | 46:44 |
| 1991 | World Race Walking Cup | San Jose, United States | 15th | 10 km | 46:13 |
| 1991 | Pan American Games | Havana, Cuba | 2nd | 10 km | 46:51.53 |
| 1991 | World Championships | Tokyo, Japan | 19th | 10 km | 45:58 |
| 1992 | Olympic Games | Barcelona, Spain | 26th | 10 km | 48:23 |
| 1993 | World Championships | Stuttgart, Germany | 37th | 10 km | 48:53 |
| 1995 | World Championships | Gothenburg, Sweden | 37th | 10 km | 45:03 |
| 1996 | Olympic Games | Atlanta, United States | 20th | 10 km | 45:32 |
| 1998 | Goodwill Games | Uniondale, United States | 5th | 10,000 m | 47:36.97 |
| 2000 | Olympic Games | Sydney, Australia | 44th | 20 km | 1:47:20 |
| 2001 | World Championships | Edmonton, Canada | 19th | 20 km | 1:37:57 |

== Personal life ==
She is a vegetarian and affirms that her success as an athlete is due in a large part to a vegetarian diet.
