= Mari Cruz Díaz =

Spanish racewalker (born 1969)

Medal record

Women's athletics

Representing Spain

European Championships
Gold medal – first place	1986 Stuttgart	10 km walk

María Cruz Díaz García (born 24 October 1969 in Barcelona, Spain) is a retired female race walker from Spain, who won the gold medal over 10 km at the 1986 European Championships in Stuttgart.

== Achievements ==
Year	Competition	Venue	Position	Event	Notes
Representing Spain
1986	World Junior Championships	Athens, Greece	4th	5000m	23:07.66
1986	European Championships	Stuttgart, West Germany	1st	10 km	46:09
1987	World Race Walking Cup	New York City, United States	10th	10 km	45:39
1987	World Championships	Rome, Italy	4th	10 km	44:48
1988	European Indoor Championships	Budapest, Hungary	3rd	3000m	12:55.03
1988	World Junior Championships	Sudbury, Canada	1st	5000m	21:51.31
1989	World Race Walking Cup	L'Hospitalet, Spain	16th	10 km	46:12
1991	World Race Walking Cup	San Jose, United States	10th	10 km	46:38
1991	World Championships	Tokyo, Japan	15th	10 km	45:23
1992	Olympic Games	Barcelona, Spain	10th	10 km	45:32
2003	World Championships	Paris, France	—	20 km	DQ
