= 1987 World Championships in Athletics – Women's 10 kilometres walk =

These are the official results of the Women's 10 km Walk event at the 1987 World Championships in Rome, Italy. The race was held on Tuesday 1 September 1987.

== Medalists ==
Gold	Irina Strakhova; Soviet Union (URS)
Silver	Kerry Saxby-Junna; Australia (AUS)
Bronze	Yan Hong; China (CHN)

== Abbreviations ==
- All times shown are in hours:minutes:seconds

DNS	did not start
NM	no mark
WR	world record
WL	world leading
AR	area record
NR	national record
PB	personal best
SB	season best

== Records ==
Standing records prior to the 1987 World Athletics Championships
World record	Kerry Saxby-Junna (AUS)	42:52	May 4, 1987	Melbourne, Australia
Event record	New event			

== Final ranking ==
Rank	Athlete	Time	Note
1st place, gold medalist(s)	Irina Strakhova (URS)	44:12	
2nd place, silver medalist(s)	Kerry Saxby-Junna (AUS)	44:23	
3rd place, bronze medalist(s)	Yan Hong (CHN)	44:42	
4	Mari Cruz Díaz (ESP)	44:48	NR
5	Yelena Nikolayeva (URS)	44:54	
6	Monica Gunnarsson (SWE)	45:09	NR
7	Jin Bingjie (CHN)	45:24	
8	Ann Peel (CAN)	45:27	
9	Maria Reyes Sobrino (ESP)	45:37	
10	Dana Vavracová (TCH)	46:10	
11	Ann Jansson (SWE)	46:15	
12	Susan Cook (AUS)	46:20	
13	Lisa Langford (GBR)	46:23	
14	Janice McCaffrey (CAN)	46:41	
15	Lynn Weik (USA)	46:51	
16	Beate Gummelt (GDR)	47:00	
17	María Colín (MEX)	47:23	
18	Giuliana Salce (ITA)	47:28	
19	Sari Essayah (FIN)	47:30	
20	Debbi Lawrence (USA)	47:31	
21	Alison Baker (CAN)	47:48	
22	Suzanne Griesbach (FRA)	48:06	
23	Sirkka Oikarinen (FIN)	48:25	
24	Maryanne Torrellas (USA)	48:27	
25	Beverley Allen (GBR)	48:50	
26	Solvi Furnes (NOR)	49:18	
27	Graciela Mendoza (MEX)	49:46	
28	Hideko Hirayama (JPN)	49:50	NR
29	Emilia Cano (ESP)	50:11	
30	Mirva Hämäläinen (FIN)	52:03	
DISQUALIFIED (DSQ)
—	Guan Ping (CHN)	DSQ	
—	Olga Krishtop (URS)	DSQ	
DID NOT FINISH (DNF)
—	Lorraine Jachno (AUS)	DNF	
—	Maria Grazia Orsani (ITA)	DNF	
—	Barbara Kollorz (FRG)	DNF	

== See also ==
- 1986 Women's European Championships 10km Walk (Stuttgart)
- 1987 Race Walking Year Ranking
- 1990 Women's European Championships 10km Walk (Split)
- 1992 Women's Olympic 10km Walk (Barcelona)
