= Madelein Svensson =

Swedish racewalker

Britta Madelein Svensson (born 20 July 1969) is a Swedish retired race walker. She won the silver medal in the women's 10 km Walk at the 1991 World Championships in Tokyo, Japan and represented her country at the 1992 Summer Olympics in Barcelona, Spain, where she ended up in sixth place in the women's 10 km Walk event.

== Achievements ==
Year	Competition	Venue	Position	Notes
Representing Sweden
1990	European Championships	Split, Yugoslavia	17th	10 km
1991	World Race Walking Cup	San Jose, United States	13th	10 km
1991	World Championships	Tokyo, Japan	2nd	10 km
1992	Olympic Games	Barcelona, Spain	6th	10 km
1993	World Race Walking Cup	Monterrey, Mexico	4th	10 km
