= Martin St. Pierre (race walker) =

Canadian racewalker

Personal information
- Born: 4 March 1972 (age 53) Ripon, Quebec, Canada

Sport
- Sport: Athletics
- Event: Racewalking

Martin St. Pierre (born 4 March 1972) is a Canadian racewalker. He competed in the men's 20 kilometres walk at the 1996 Summer Olympics.
