= Eva Machuca =

Mexican racewalker

Personal information
- Full name: Eva Yolanda Machuca Villasana
- Nationality: Mexican
- Born: 14 January 1970 (age 56)

Sport
- Sport: Athletics
- Event: Racewalking

Eva Yolanda Machuca Villasana (born 14 January 1970) is a Mexican racewalker. She competed in the women's 10 kilometres walk at the 1992 Summer Olympics.
