= Yelena Arshintseva =

Russian racewalker

Yelena Arshintseva (born 5 April 1971) is a retired female race walker from Russia, who competed for her native country in the early 1990s.

== International competitions ==
Representing Russia
Year	Competition	Venue	Position	Event	Result	Notes
1993	World Championships	Stuttgart, Germany	12th	10 km	45:17	
1994	European Indoor Championships	Paris, France	3rd	3000 m	11:57.48	
1994	European Championships	Helsinki, Finland	4th	10 km	43:23	
