= Encarna Granados =

Spanish race walker (born 1972)

Encarnación "Encarna" Granados Aguilera (born 30 January 1972 in Girona, Catalonia) is a Spanish race walker, who won the bronze medal over 10 km at the 1993 World Championships in Stuttgart.

== Achievements ==
Year	Competition	Venue	Position	Event	Notes
Representing Spain
1992	Olympic Games	Barcelona, Spain	14th	10 km	46:00
1993	World Championships	Stuttgart, Germany	3rd	10 km	43:21
1994	European Championships	Helsinki, Finland	15th	10 km	45:43
1995	World Race Walking Cup	Beijing, PR China	16th	10 km	44:28
1995	World Championships	Gothenburg, Sweden	16th	10 km	44:19
1996	Olympic Games	Atlanta, United States	—	10 km	DNF
1998	European Championships	Budapest, Hungary	—	10 km	DNF
2000	Olympic Games	Sydney, Australia	20th	20 km	1:35:06
