= Ileana Salvador =

Italian race walker (born 1962)

Personal information
- National team: Italy: 20 caps (1987-1996); Sweden: 3 caps (2005-2007)
- Born: 16 January 1962 (age 64) Noale, Italy
- Height: 1.63 m (5 ft 4 in)
- Weight: 52 kg (115 lb)

Sport
- Sport: Athletics
- Event: Racewalking
- Club: Fiamma Vicenza (1987-1990); Fiat Sud Formia (1991); Sisport Fiat Torino (1992-1996)
- Retired: 2007

Achievements and titles
- Personal bests: 10 km: 41:30 (1993); 20 km: 1:31:53 (1993)
Medal record
Women's athletics
Representing Italy
Event	1st	2nd	3rd
World Championships	0	1	0
European Championships	0	0	1
World Indoor Championships	0	0	3
European Indoor Championships	0	3	0
Summer Universiade	1	0	0
World Race Walking Cup	1	2	2
Total	2	6	6
World Championships
Silver medal – second place	1993 Stuttgart	10 km walk
World Indoor Championships
Bronze medal – third place	1989 Budapest	3000 m walk
Bronze medal – third place	1991 Seville	3000 m walk
Bronze medal – third place	1993 Toronto	3000 m walk
European Championships
Bronze medal – third place	1990 Split	10 km walk
European Indoor Championships
Silver medal – second place	1989 The Hague	3000 m walk
Silver medal – second place	1990 Glasgow	3000 m walk
Silver medal – second place	1992 Genoa	3000 m walk
Summer Universiade
Gold medal – first place	1989 Duisburg	5 km walk

Ileana Salvador (born 16 January 1962) is a former Italian race walker who won eight medals at the World Championships and European Championships

In 2005 she acquired Swedish citizenship.

== Biography ==
She won ten medals, at the senior level, at the International athletics competitions. Specializing in indoor competitions, boasts six medals (three European silver and three World bronze), all earned indoor. She participated at one edition of the Summer Olympics (1992), she has 29 caps in national team from 1987 to 1996. She was twice World Best Year Performance in Women's Race Walking: 1992 in the 10 km walk and 1993 in the 20 km walk.

Her career and her life, has inspired a book La marcia infinita di Ileana (The neverending racewalking of Ileana), from Valter Esposito (2006, Il Prato publisher).

== Personal life ==
Ileana Salvador is the companion of the Swedish racewalker, Olympic silver medalist and European Championships bronze medalist, Bo Gustafsson, lives in Sweden from 1996. The couple has two daughters, Nicole (born 1995) and Noelle (born 1998) who is a model and in 2019 she participated in the selections for the Miss Italia contest. She is a teacher of italian language and Consular Officer at Embassy of Italy in Sweden.

== The bronze medal in Barcelona 1992 ==
At the 1992 Summer Olympics in Barcelona, Ileana Salvador won the bronze medal in the 10 km race walk. Or at least she finished third and for 20 minutes rightly celebrated her triumph, only to discover that she was disqualified for having taken the third red card for irregular racewalking, which entails the disqualification, just when she had entered the Stadium sure of her third position.

== Records ==
She is holder of two world records in not Olympic distance, but recognized by IAAF and former holder of two more records.

=== World records ===
- 25 km walk: 2:08:46 ( (Sweden) Växjö, 28 September 1996) - current holder
- 3000 m walk (track): 11:48:24 ( (Italy) Padua, 29 August 1993) - current holder
- 2 miles walk indoor: 13:11.88 ( (Italy) Genoa, 14 February 1990) - until 14 September 1996
- 10,000 m walk (track): 42:39.2 ( (Italy) Genoa, 17 June 1989) - until 26 May 1990

=== European records ===
- 5000 m walk (track): 20:25.2 ( (Spain) Barcelona, 5 April 1992) - until 11 July 1995

=== National records ===
- 10,000 m walk (track): 42:23.7 ( (Norway) Bergen, 8 May 1993) - until 23 April 2017

== Achievements ==
Year	Competition	Venue	Rank	Event	Time
1989	World Indoor Championships	(Hungary) Budapest	3rd	3000 m walk	12:11.33
1989	World Race Walking Cup	(Spain) L'Hospitalet	3rd	10 km walk team	203 pts
1989	World Race Walking Cup	(Spain) L'Hospitalet	3rd	10 km walk	43.24
1989	Universiade	(West Germany) Duisburg	1st	5000 m walk	20.44
1989	European Indoor Championships	(Netherlands) The Haugue	2nd	3000 m walk	12:32.43
1990	European Indoor Championships	(United Kingdom) Glasgow	2nd	3000 m walk	12:18.84
1990	European Championships	(Socialist Federal Republic of Yugoslavia) Split	3rd	10 km walk	44:38]
1991	World Indoor Championships	(Spain) Seville	3rd	3000 m walk	12.07.67
1991	World Race Walking Cup	(United States) San Jose	6th	10 km walk	44.52
1991	World Race Walking Cup	(United States) San Jose	2nd	10 km walk team	180 pts
1991	World Championships	(Japan) Tokyo	7th	10 km walk	44.09
1992	European Indoor Championships	(Italy) Genoa	2nd	3000 m walk	11:53.23
1992	Olympic Games	(Spain) Barcelona	DSQ	10 km walk	no time
1993	World Indoor Championships	(Canada) Toronto	3rd	3000 m walk	11:55.35
1993	World Race Walking Cup	(Mexico) Monterrey	6th	10 km walk	46.02
1993	World Race Walking Cup	(Mexico) Monterrey	1st	10 km walk team	196 pts
1993	World Championships	(Germany) Stuttgart	2nd	10 km walk	43:08
1994	European Championships	(Finland) Helsinki	11th	10 km walk	44:51
1995	World Race Walking Cup	(China) Beijing	31st	10 km walk	45:55
1995	World Race Walking Cup	(China) Beijing	2nd	10 km walk team	429 pts

== National titles ==
Salvador won 19 national championships at individual senior level, 15 Italian and 4 Swedish.

- Italian Athletics Championships
  - 5000 metres walk: 1989, 1990, 1991, 1992, 1993 (5)
  - 10 km walk: 1987, 1989, 1990, 1992, 1993 (5)
  - 20 km walk: 1993 (1)
- Italian Athletics Indoor Championships
  - 3000 metres walk: 1988, 1990, 1992, 1993 (4)
- Swedish Athletics Championships
  - 5000 metres walk: 1997 (1)
  - 10 km walk: 1997 (1)
- Swedish Athletics Indoor Championships
  - 3000 metres walk: 1997, 2001 (2)

== See also ==
- Italian all-time lists - 20 km walk
- List of world records in athletics
- List of European records in athletics
- Italian records in athletics
- Italy at the IAAF World Race Walking Cup
- Italian team at the running events
