= Kerry Saxby-Junna =

Australian race walker

Kerry-Anne Saxby-Junna
Personal information
- Born: 2 June 1961 (age 65) Young, New South Wales

Kerry-Anne Saxby-Junna, born Kerry Saxby AM (born 2 June 1961) is an Australian retired race walker. She represented Australia 27 times in international competitions and set 32 world records or world bests. She won 27 Australian Championships and 13 individual international medals. She retired in 2001.

== Life ==
She was born in Young, New South Wales and grew up in Ballina, New South Wales.

== Recognition ==
- Australian Institute of Sport (AIS) Athlete of the Year in 1986/87, 1987/1988, 1989 and in 2005 was inducted into the AIS 'Best of the Best'.
- Member of the Order of Australia (AM) in 1992
- Australian Sports Medal in 2000
- Centenary Medal in 2001
- Athletics Australia Hall of Fame in 2013

== Achievements ==
Year	Competition	Venue	Position	Notes
Representing Australia
1985	World Race Walking Cup	St John's, Isle of Man	10th	10 km
1986	Goodwill Games	Moscow, Soviet Union	1st	10 km
1987	World Race Walking Cup	New York City, United States	4th	10 km
1987	World Championships	Rome, Italy	2nd	10 km
1989	World Indoor Championships	Budapest, Hungary	1st	3000 m
1989	World Race Walking Cup	L'Hospitalet de Llobregat, Spain	2nd	10 km
1990	Commonwealth Games	Auckland, New Zealand	1st	10 km
1990	Goodwill Games	Seattle, United States	2nd	10,000 m
1991	World Indoor Championships	Seville, Spain	2nd	3000 m
1991	World Race Walking Cup	San Jose, United States	5th	10 km
1991	World Championships	Tokyo, Japan	5th	10 km
1992	Olympic Games	Barcelona, Spain	15th	10 km
1993	World Indoor Championships	Toronto, Canada	2nd	3000 m
1993	World Race Walking Cup	Monterrey, Mexico	5th	10 km
1993	World Championships	Stuttgart, Germany	DNF	10 km
1994	Commonwealth Games	Victoria, Canada	1st	10 km
1995	World Race Walking Cup	Beijing, China	5th	10 km
1995	World Championships	Gothenburg, Sweden	9th	10 km
1996	Olympic Games	Atlanta, United States	12th	10 km
1998	Commonwealth Games	Kuala Lumpur, Malaysia	2nd	10 km
1999	World Championships	Seville, Spain	3rd	20 km
2000	Olympic Games	Sydney, Australia	7th	20 km
2001	World Championships	Edmonton, Canada	DSQ	20 km

== Legacy ==
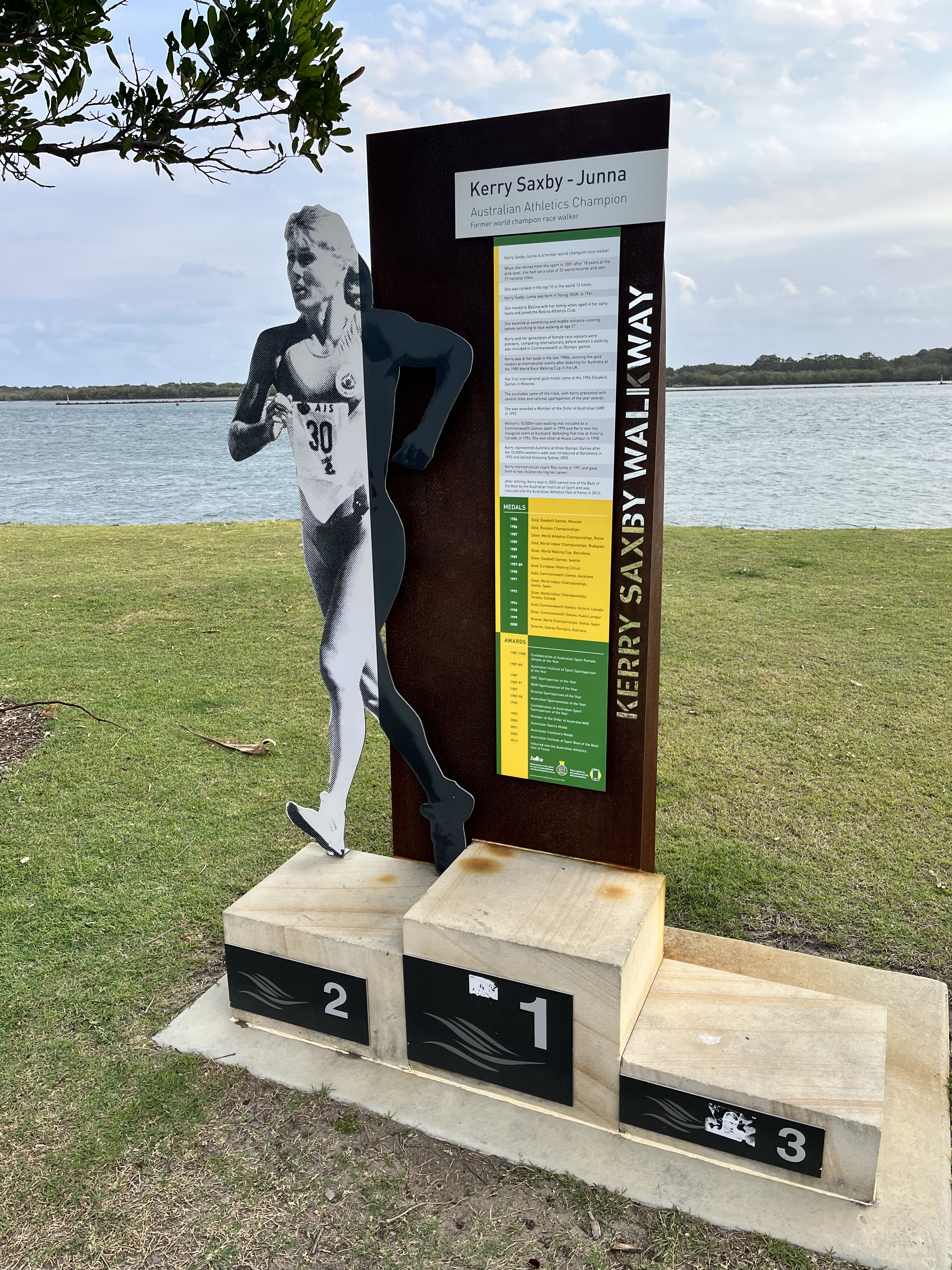
Kerry Saxby Walkway

There is a walkway in Ballina named for her which is called the "Kerry Saxby Walkway" which runs from Captain Cook Park to the end of North Wall. In January 2021 Saxby-Junna was further honoured with an interpretive signage display, which serves as a rest stop on this walkway, this display is over two metres high and details her athletic achievements. Saxby-Junna was there for the unveiling by Ballina Mayor David Wright and it sits on the river bank near the Ballina War Memorial Pool.

Records
Preceded by Olga Krishtop	Women's 10 km Walk World Record Holder; 4 May 1987 – 4 June 1995	Succeeded by Larisa Ramazanova
Preceded by Sally Pierson	Women's 20 km Walk World Record Holder; 13 May 1988 – 1 May 1995	Succeeded by Liu Hongyu
