= Pascale Grand =

Canadian racewalker

Personal information
- Born: August 12, 1967 (age 59) Montreal, Quebec
- Height: 1.69 m (5 ft 7 in)
- Weight: 48 kg (106 lb)

Sport
- Country: Canada
- Sport: Athletics
- Event: Racewalking
- Updated on 27 July 2013

Pascale Grand (born August 12, 1967 in Montreal, Quebec) is a retired female racewalker from Canada. She set her personal best in the women's 10 km race walk event (45:46) in 1991.

== Achievements ==
Year	Competition	Venue	Position	Event	Notes
Representing Canada
1986	Pan American Race Walking Cup	Saint Léonard, Canada	15th	10 km	50:49
1988	Pan American Race Walking Cup	Mar del Plata, Argentina	7th	10 km	48:35
1991	World Championships	Tokyo, Japan	21st	10 km	46:17
1992	Olympic Games	Barcelona, Spain	29th	10 km	49:14
1994	Jeux de la Francophonie	Paris, France	3rd	10 km	46:40.88
