= Yuko Sato (race walker) =

Japanese racewalker

Personal information
- Nationality: Japanese
- Born: 23 January 1968 (age 57)

Sport
- Sport: Athletics
- Event: Racewalking

Yuko Sato (Japanese: 佐藤 優子, Hepburn: Satō Yūko; born 23 January 1968) is a Japanese racewalker. She competed in the women's 10 kilometres walk at the 1992 Summer Olympics.
