= Alina Ivanova =

Russian athletics competitor

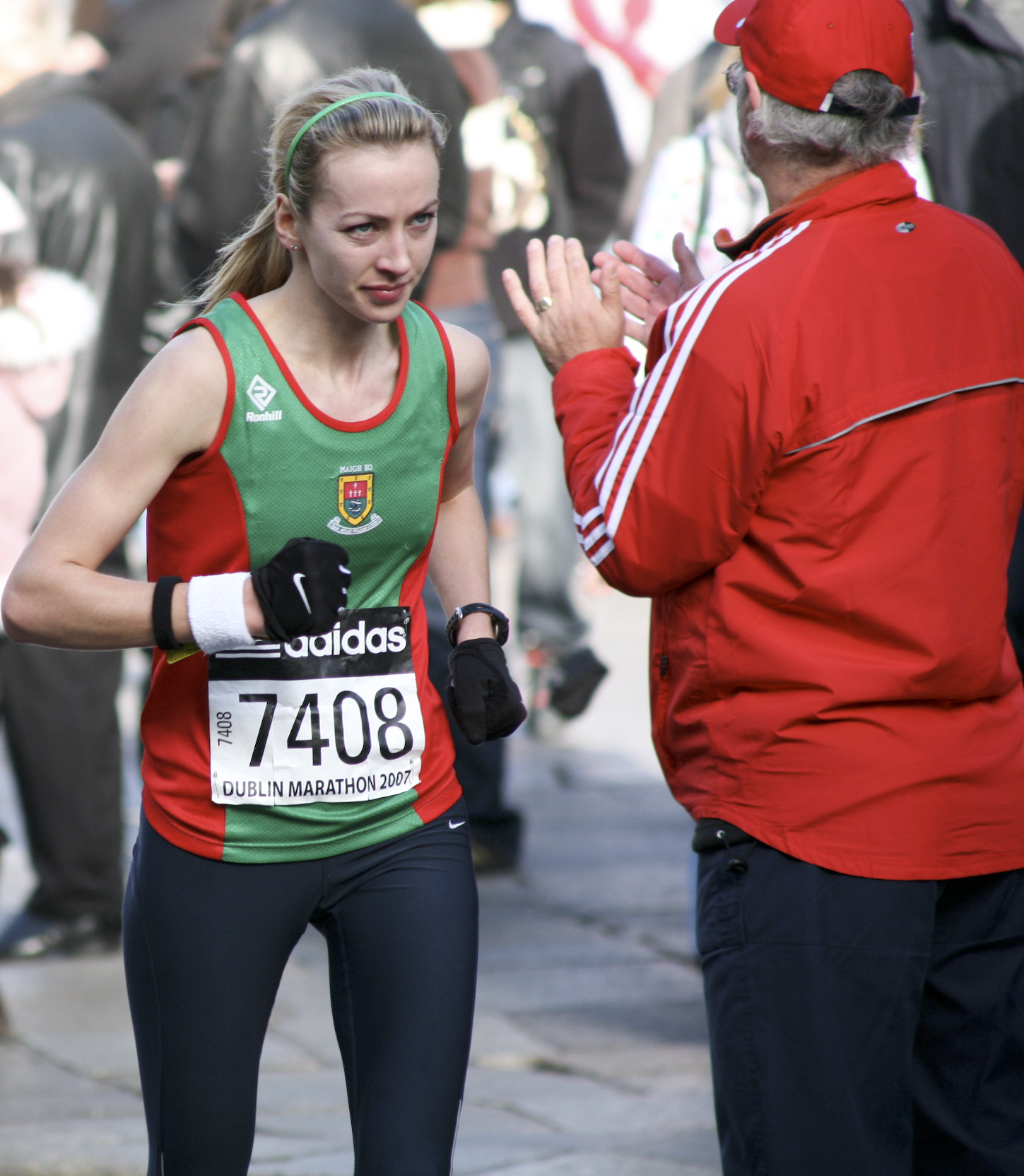
- Alina Ivanova at the Adidas Dublin Marathon, 2007

Personal information
- Born: 16 March 1969 (age 57) Kildishevo, Yadrinsky District, Chuvash ASSR

Sport
- Sport: Race walking Long-distance running
Medal record
Representing Soviet Union
World Championships
Gold medal – first place	1991 Tokyo	10 km walk
Representing Unified Team
European Indoor Championships
Gold medal – first place	1992 Genoa	3000 m walk

Alina Petrovna Ivanova (Russian: Алина Петровна Иванова; born 16 March 1969) is a retired Russian long-distance athlete who competed in race walking and road running. She is best known for winning the gold medal in the women's 10 km walk at the 1991 World Championships in Tokyo, Japan. She represented the Unified Team at the 1992 Summer Olympics in Barcelona, Spain.

She changed to the marathon run later in her career and was a two-time winner at both the Prague International Marathon (2000 & 2006) and the Dublin Marathon (2006 & 2007).

== International competitions ==
Year	Competition	Venue	Position	Event	Notes
Representing the Soviet Union
1988	World Junior Championships	Sudbury, Canada	—	5000 m walk	DQ
1991	World Championships	Tokyo, Japan	1st	10 km walk	42.57
Representing Russia
1995	Pittsburgh Marathon	Pittsburgh, United States	1st	Marathon	2:35:30
1997	World Championships	Athens, Greece	—	Marathon	DNF
1998	Hong Kong Marathon	Hong Kong, China	1st	Marathon	2:39:26
2000	Prague Marathon	Prague, Czech Republic	1st	Marathon	2:27:42
2000	Berlin Marathon	Berlin, Germany	8th	Marathon	2:31:26
2001	London Marathon	London, United Kingdom	7th	Marathon	2:25:34
2002	European Championships	Munich, Germany	—	Marathon	DNF
2006	Prague Marathon	Prague, Czech Republic	1st	Marathon	2:29:20
