= 1998 in race walking =

This page lists the World Best Year Performance in the year 1998 in both the men's and the women's race walking distances: 20 km and 50 km (outdoor). One of the main events during this season were the 1998 European Athletics Championships in Budapest, Hungary.

== Abbreviations ==
- All times shown are in hours:minutes:seconds

| WR | world record |
| AR | area record |
| CR | event record |
| NR | national record |
| PB | personal best |

== Men's 20 km ==
=== Records ===
Standing records prior to the 1998 season in track and field
| World Record | Bu Lingtang (CHN) | 1:18:04 | April 7, 1994 | Beijing, PR China |

=== 1998 World Year Ranking ===
| Rank | Time | Athlete | Venue | Date | Note |
|---|---|---|---|---|---|
| 1 | 1:18:40 | Vladimir Andreyev (RUS) | Cheboksary, Russia | 30/08/1998 | |
| 2 | 1:18:48 | Mikhail Khmelnitskiy (BLR) | Adler, Russia | 20/02/1998 | |
| 3 | 1:18:48 | Rishat Shafikov (RUS) | Cheboksary, Russia | 30/08/1998 | |
| 4 | 1:19:19 | Jefferson Pérez (ECU) | Naumburg, Germany | 23/05/1998 | |
| 5 | 1:19:28 | Ruslan Alukayev (RUS) | Cheboksary, Russia | 30/08/1998 | |
| 6 | 1:19:36 | Robert Korzeniowski (POL) | Turku, Finland | 24/05/1998 | |
| 7 | 1:19:41 | Daniel García (MEX) | Naumburg, Germany | 23/05/1998 | |
| 8 | 1:19:42 | Julio René Martínez (GUA) | La Coruña, Spain | 16/05/1998 | |
| 9 | 1:19:43 | Yevgeniy Misyulya (BLR) | Hildesheim, Germany | 13/09/1998 | |
| 10 | 1:19:44 | Aigars Fadejevs (LAT) | Rio Maior, Portugal | 28/03/1998 | |
| 11 | 1:19:45 | Joel Sánchez (MEX) | La Coruña, Spain | 16/05/1998 | |
| 12 | 1:19:46 | Bernardo Segura (MEX) | Naumburg, Germany | 23/05/1998 | |
| 13 | 1:19:46 | Ilya Markov (RUS) | Turku, Finland | 24/05/1998 | |
| 14 | 1:19:48 | Ivan Trotskiy (BLR) | Naumburg, Germany | 23/05/1998 | |
| 15 | 1:19:50 | Daisuke Ikeshima (JPN) | Takahata, Japan | 01/11/1998 | |
| 16 | 1:19:52 | Alejandro López (MEX) | Naumburg, Germany | 23/05/1998 | |
| 17 | 1:19:57 | Artur Meleshkevich (BLR) | Naumburg, Germany | 23/05/1998 | |
| 18 | 1:20:04 | Andrey Makarov (BLR) | Naumburg, Germany | 23/05/1998 | |
| 19 | 1:20:12 | Nikolay Matyukhin (RUS) | Adler, Russia | 20/02/1998 | |
| 20 | 1:20:13 | Yevgeniy Shmalyuk (RUS) | Izhevsk, Russia | 16/05/1998 | |
| 21 | 1:20:25 | Yu Guohui (CHN) | Bangkok, Thailand | 13/12/1998 | |
| 22 | 1:20:31 | Viktor Ginko (BLR) | Adler, Russia | 20/02/1998 | |
| 23 | 1:20:31 | Paquillo Fernández (ESP) | Dudince, Slovakia | 25/04/1998 | |
| 24 | 1:20:42 | Dmitriy Yesipchuk (RUS) | Izhevsk, Russia | 16/05/1998 | |
| 25 | 1:20:50 | Mikhail Orlov (RUS) | Cheboksary, Russia | 30/08/1998 | |

== Men's 50 km ==
=== Records ===
Standing records prior to the 1998 season in track and field
| World Record | Andrey Perlov (URS) | 3:37:41 | August 5, 1989 | Leningrad, Soviet Union |

=== 1998 World Year Ranking ===
| Rank | Time | Athlete | Venue | Date | Note |
|---|---|---|---|---|---|
| 1 | 3:41:14 | Andrey Plotnikov (RUS) | Izhevsk, Russia | 16/05/1998 | |
| 2 | 3:42:57 | Tomasz Lipiec (POL) | Dudince, Slovakia | 25/04/1998 | |
| 3 | 3:43:15 | Miguel Rodríguez (MEX) | Naumburg, Germany | 23/05/1998 | |
| 4 | 3:43:17 | Jesús Ángel García (ESP) | Dudince, Slovakia | 25/04/1998 | |
| 5 | 3:43:18 | Aigars Fadejevs (LAT) | Ogre, Latvia | 06/06/1998 | |
| 6 | 3:43:51 | Robert Korzeniowski (POL) | Budapest, Hungary | 21/08/1998 | |
| 7 | 3:44:17 | Giovanni Perricelli (ITA) | Dudince, Slovakia | 25/04/1998 | |
| 8 | 3:44:29 | Valentin Kononen (FIN) | Budapest, Hungary | 21/08/1998 | |
| 9 | 3:45:15 | Sergey Korepanov (KAZ) | Naumburg, Germany | 23/05/1998 | |
| 10 | 3:45:29 | Nikolay Matyukhin (RUS) | Izhevsk, Russia | 16/05/1998 | |
| 11 | 3:45:55 | Santiago Pérez (ESP) | Ourense, Spain | 22/02/1998 | |
| 12 | 3:46:25 | Thierry Toutain (FRA) | Naumburg, Germany | 23/05/1998 | |
| 13 | 3:46:31 | Aleksey Voyevodin (RUS) | Dudince, Slovakia | 25/04/1998 | |
| 14 | 3:47:24 | Mikel Odriozola (ESP) | Budapest, Hungary | 21/08/1998 | |
| 15 | 3:47:28 | Basilio Labrador (ESP) | Dudince, Slovakia | 25/04/1998 | |
| 16 | 3:47:34 | Dion Russell (AUS) | Melbourne, Australia | 13/12/1998 | |
| 17 | 3:47:41 | René Piller (FRA) | Dudince, Slovakia | 25/04/1998 | |
| 18 | 3:47:44 | German Skurygin (RUS) | Izhevsk, Russia | 16/05/1998 | |
| 19 | 3:47:48 | Modris Liepinš (LAT) | Naumburg, Germany | 23/05/1998 | |
| 20 | 3:47:51 | Pavel Nikolayev (RUS) | Dudince, Slovakia | 25/04/1998 | |
| 21 | 3:48:24 | Dmitriy Dolnikov (RUS) | Izhevsk, Russia | 16/05/1998 | |
| 22 | 3:48:27 | Viktor Ginko (BLR) | Dudince, Slovakia | 25/04/1998 | |
| 23 | 3:48:49 | Arturo Di Mezza (ITA) | Budapest, Hungary | 21/08/1998 | |
| 24 | 3:49:38 | Fumio Imamura (JPN) | Wajima, Japan | 12/04/1998 | |
| 25 | 3:49:40 | Štefan Malík (SVK) | Dudince, Slovakia | 25/04/1998 | |

== Women's 10 km ==
=== Records ===
Standing records prior to the 1998 season in track and field
| World Record | Yelena Nikolayeva (RUS) | 41:04.00 | April 20, 1996 | Sochi, Russia |

=== 1998 World Year Ranking ===
| Rank | Time | Athlete | Venue | Date | Note |
|---|---|---|---|---|---|
| 1 | 42:01.00 | Olga Panfyorova (RUS) | Izhevsk, Russia | 16/05/1998 | |
| 2 | 42:25.00 | Nadezhda Ryashkina (RUS) | Adler, Russia | 20/02/1998 | |
| 3 | 42:26.00 | Larisa Khmelnitskaya (BLR) | Hildesheim, Germany | 12/09/1998 | |
| 4 | 42:31.00 | Vera Nacharkina (RUS) | Izhevsk, Russia | 16/05/1998 | |
| 5 | 42:40.00 | Olga Kardopoltseva (BLR) | Hildesheim, Germany | 12/09/1998 | |
| 6 | 42:43.00 | Katarzyna Radtke (POL) | Gdansk, Poland | 29/08/1998 | |
| 7 | 42:44.00 | Kjersti Plätzer (NOR) | Hildesheim, Germany | 12/09/1998 | |
| 8 | 42:45.00 | Yelena Arshintseva (RUS) | Cheboksary, Russia | 30/08/1998 | |
| 9 | 42:46.00 | Tamara Kovalenko (RUS) | Izhevsk, Russia | 16/05/1998 | |
| 10 | 42:49.00 | Annarita Sidoti (ITA) | Budapest, Hungary | 20/08/1998 | |
| 11 | 42:52.00 | Kerry Saxby-Junna (AUS) | Adelaide, Australia | 26/01/1998 | |
| 12 | 42:54.00 | Erica Alfridi (ITA) | Budapest, Hungary | 20/08/1998 | |
| 13 | 42:55.00 | Susana Feitor (POR) | Budapest, Hungary | 20/08/1998 | |
| 14 | 42:57.00 | Norica Câmpean (ROM) | Bucharest, Romania | 20/06/1998 | |
| 15 | 42:59.00 | Mária Urbanik (HUN) | Budapest, Hungary | 20/08/1998 | |
| 16 | 43:02.00 | María Vasco (ESP) | Budapest, Hungary | 20/08/1998 | |
| 17 | 43:08.00 | Natalya Misyulya (BLR) | Gdansk, Poland | 29/08/1998 | |
| 19 | 43:11.00 | Claudia Stef (ROM) | Bucharest, Romania | 20/06/1998 | |
| 20 | 43:15.00 | Graciela Mendoza (MEX) | Eisenhüttenstadt, Germany | 09/05/1998 | |
| 21 | 43:21.00 | Rossella Giordano (ITA) | Abano Terme, Italy | 20/09/1998 | |
| 22 | 43:22.00 | Tatyana Ragozina (UKR) | Dudince, Slovakia | 25/04/1998 | |
| 23 | 43:23.00 | Yelena Gruzinova (RUS) | Izhevsk, Russia | 16/05/1998 | |
| 24 | 43:24.00 | Lyudmila Dolgopolova (BLR) | Gdansk, Poland | 29/08/1998 | |
| 25 | 43:25.00 | Yuan Yufang (MAS) | Eisenhüttenstadt, Germany | 09/05/1998 | |

== Women's 20 km ==
=== Records ===
Standing records prior to the 1998 season in track and field
| World Record | Liu Hongyu (CHN) | 1:27:30 | May 1, 1995 | Beijing, PR China |

=== 1998 World Year Ranking ===
| Rank | Time | Athlete | Venue | Date | Note |
|---|---|---|---|---|---|
| 1 | 1:29:53 | Tatyana Sibileva (RUS) | Cheboksary, Russia | 29/08/1998 | |
| 2 | 1:31:03 | Susana Feitor (POR) | Cacia, Portugal | 08/02/1998 | |
| 3 | 1:31:46 | Katarzyna Radtke (POL) | Naumburg, Germany | 23/05/1998 | |
| 4 | 1:32:16 | Yelena Gruzinova (RUS) | Cheboksary, Russia | 29/08/1998 | |
| 5 | 1:32:25 | Valentina Tsybulskaya (BLR) | Naumburg, Germany | 23/05/1998 | |
| 6 | 1:32:49 | Valentina Savchuk (UKR) | Mukachevo, Ukraine | 24/10/1998 | |
| 7 | 1:32:55 | Kjersti Plätzer (NOR) | Copenhagen, Denmark | 26/09/1998 | |
| 8 | 1:33:01 | Anita Liepina (LAT) | Ogre, Latvia | 06/06/1998 | |
| 9 | 1:33:12 | Yuliya Voyevodina (RUS) | Cheboksary, Russia | 29/08/1998 | |
| 10 | 1:33:14 | Kerry Saxby-Junna (AUS) | Melbourne, Australia | 13/12/1998 | |
| 11 | 1:33:26 | Mária Urbanik (HUN) | Budapest, Hungary | 07/02/1998 | |
| 12 | 1:33:34 | Maria del Rosario Sánchez (MEX) | Naumburg, Germany | 23/05/1998 | |
| 13 | 1:33:35 | Rie Mitsumori (JPN) | Takahata, Japan | 01/11/1998 | |
| 14 | 1:33:46 | Santa Compagnoni (ITA) | Ivrea, Italy | 15/03/1998 | |
| 15 | 1:34:09 | Margarita Nazarova (RUS) | Cheboksary, Russia | 29/08/1998 | |
| 16 | 1:34:11 | María Vasco (ESP) | Ourense, Spain | 22/02/1998 | |
| 17 | 1:34:13 | Yuka Mitsumori (JPN) | Takahata, Japan | 01/11/1998 | |
| 18 | 1:34:17 | Elvira Ivanova (RUS) | Cheboksary, Russia | 29/08/1998 | |
| 19 | 1:34:32 | Elisabetta Perrone (ITA) | Ivrea, Italy | 15/03/1998 | |
| 20 | 1:34:35 | Wendy Muldoon (AUS) | Melbourne, Australia | 16/08/1998 | |
| 21 | 1:34:46 | Joanne Dow (USA) | Albany, United States | 03/05/1998 | |
| 22 | 1:34:50 | María Guadalupe Sánchez (MEX) | Naumburg, Germany | 23/05/1998 | |
