= 1997 World Championships in Athletics – Women's 10 kilometres walk =

These are the official results of the Women's 10 km Walk event at the 1997 World Championships, with the final held on Thursday 7 August 1997 in Athens, Greece. There were a total number of 41 participating athletes.

== Medalists ==
Gold	Annarita Sidoti; Italy (ITA)
Silver	Olga Kardopoltseva; Belarus (BLR)
Bronze	Valentina Tsybulskaya; Belarus (BLR)

== Final ==
RANK	FINAL RANKING	TIME
	Annarita Sidoti (ITA)	42:55.49
	Olga Kardopoltseva (BLR)	43:30.20
	Valentina Tsybulskaya (BLR)	43:49.24
4.	Liu Hongyu (CHN)	43:56.86
5.	Erica Alfridi (ITA)	43:59.73
6.	Anikó Szebenszky (HUN)	44:14.94
7.	Gu Yan (CHN)	44:24.17
8.	Anita Liepina (LAT)	45:00.56
9.	Yelena Nikolayeva (RUS)	45:01.90
10.	Elisabetta Perrone (ITA)	45:16.64
11.	Mária Urbanik (HUN)	45:36.57
12.	Wang Yan (CHN)	46:21.69
13.	Svetlana Tolstaya (KAZ)	47:09.51
14.	Yuka Mitsumori (JPN)	47:24.22
—	Larisa Ramazanova (BLR)	DNF
—	Beate Gummelt (GER)	DNF
—	Irina Stankina (RUS)	DSQ
—	Maya Sazonova (KAZ)	DSQ
—	Olga Panfyorova (RUS)	DSQ
—	Olimpiada Ivanova (RUS)	DSQ

== Qualifying heats ==
- Held on Monday 4 August 1997

RANK	HEAT 1	TIME
1.	Anita Liepina (LAT)	44:07.88
2.	Mária Urbanik (HUN)	44:13.76
3.	Olga Kardopoltseva (BLR)	44:16.00
4.	Yelena Nikolayeva (RUS)	44:16.08
5.	Larisa Ramazanova (BLR)	44:18.49
6.	Wang Yan (CHN)	44:18.50
7.	Annarita Sidoti (ITA)	44:19.33
8.	Olga Panfyorova (RUS)	44:22.63
9.	Svetlana Tolstaya (KAZ)	44:32.34
10.	Graciela Mendoza (MEX)	44:51.81
11.	Susana Feitor (POR)	45:00.77
12.	Celia Marcen (ESP)	45:09.85
13.	Ildikó Ilyés (HUN)	45:18.02
14.	Ivonne Varas (MEX)	47:03.18
15.	Hanne Liland (NOR)	47:51.23
16.	Valérie Nadaud (FRA)	47:52.90
17.	Kathrin Born-Boyde (GER)	48:01.28
18.	Christina Kokotou (GRE)	48:52.36
19.	Aida Isayeva (AZE)	50:44.62
—	Geovana Irusta (BOL)	DSQ
—	Annastasia Karen Raj (MAS)	DSQ

RANK	HEAT 2	TIME
1.	Olimpiada Ivanova (RUS)	44:31.98
2.	Erica Alfridi (ITA)	44:32.04
3.	Elisabetta Perrone (ITA)	44:32.06
4.	Irina Stankina (RUS)	44:32.17
5.	Anikó Szebenszky (HUN)	44:32.22
6.	Valentina Tsybulskaya (BLR)	44:32.24
7.	Liu Hongyu (CHN)	44:32.47
8.	Maya Sazonova (KAZ)	44:33.48
9.	Gu Yan (CHN)	44:36.17
10.	Beate Gummelt (GER)	44:37.78
11.	Yuka Mitsumori (JPN)	44:43.99
12.	Tina Poitras (CAN)	45:18.76
13.	Jane Saville (AUS)	46:12.76
14.	Nathalie Marchand-Fortain (FRA)	46:28.58
15.	Nora Leksir (FRA)	47:15.15
16.	Valentyna Savchuk (UKR)	47:47.57
17.	Francisca Martínez (MEX)	48:29.81
18.	Miriam Ramón (ECU)	48:39.75
—	Victoria Herazo (USA)	DSQ
—	Tong Lean Cheng (MAS)	DSQ

== See also ==
- 1992 Women's Olympic 10km Walk (Barcelona)
- 1993 Women's World Championships 10km Walk (Stuttgart)
- 1994 Women's European Championships 10km Walk (Helsinki)
- 1996 Women's Olympic 10km Walk (Atlanta)
- 1998 Women's European Championships 10km Walk (Budapest)
- 1999 Women's World Championships 20km Walk (Seville)
