= 1996 European Race Walking Cup =

- Organisers: EAA
- Edition: 1st
- Dates: April 20
- Host city: A Coruña, Galicia, Spain
- Events: 3
- Participation: 121 athletes from 17 nations

The 1996 European Race Walking Cup was held in A Coruña, Spain, on April 20, 1996.

Complete results were published. Medal winners were published on the Athletics Weekly website,

== Medallists ==
Event	Gold		Silver		Bronze	
Men
20 km walk	Robert Korzeniowski (POL)	1:21:46	Daniel Plaza (ESP)	1:21:47	Fernando Vázquez (ESP)	1:21:48
50 km walk	Jesús Ángel García (ESP)	3:51:01	Arturo Di Mezza (ITA)	3:52:36	Stanisław Stosik (POL)	3:54:35
Team (Men)
20 km walk	Spain	439 pts	Russia	410 pts	Italy	410 pts
50 km walk	Spain	437 pts	Italy	436 pts	Russia	419 pts
Combined	Spain	876 pts	Italy	846 pts	Russia	829 pts
Women
10 km walk	Annarita Sidoti (ITA)	43:26	Rossella Giordano (ITA)	43:27	Susana Feitor (POR)	43:41
Eschborn Cup (Women)
Team (Women)	Italy	443 pts	Russia	421 pts	Belarus	417 pts

== Results ==
=== Men's 20 km ===
Place	Athlete	Nation	Time
1st place, gold medalist(s)	Robert Korzeniowski	Poland (POL)	1:21:46
2nd place, silver medalist(s)	Daniel Plaza	Spain (ESP)	1:21:47
3rd place, bronze medalist(s)	Fernando Vázquez	Spain (ESP)	1:21:48
4	Igor Kollár	Slovakia (SVK)	1:21:51
5	Denis Langlois	France (FRA)	1:21:55
6	Valentí Massana	Spain (ESP)	1:22:23
7	Aleksey Kronin	Russia (RUS)	1:22:43
8	Ruslan Shafikov	Russia (RUS)	1:23:13
9	Jiří Malysa	Czech Republic (CZE)	1:23:20
10	Giovanni de Benedictis	Italy (ITA)	1:23:21
11	Giovanni Perricelli	Italy (ITA)	1:23:24
12	Jean-Olivier Brosseau	France (FRA)	1:23:42
13	Artur Meleshkevich	Belarus (BLR)	1:24:24
14	Valdas Kazlauskas	Lithuania (LIT)	1:24:49
15	Claus Jørgensen	Denmark (DEN)	1:24:51
16	Modris Liepiņš	Latvia (LAT)	1:25:14
17	José Manuel Rodríguez	Spain (ESP)	1:25:17
18	Roman Mrázek	Slovakia (SVK)	1:25:54
19	Mariusz Ornoch	Poland (POL)	1:25:56
20	Enrico Lang	Italy (ITA)	1:26:14
21	Peter Tichý	Slovakia (SVK)	1:26.19
22	Ivan Trotskiy	Belarus (BLR)	1:26:24
23	Štefan Malík	Slovakia (SVK)	1:26:28
24	Mikhail Khmelnitskiy	Belarus (BLR)	1:26:30
25	Martin Engelsviken	Norway (NOR)	1:27.17
26	Hubert Sonnek	Czech Republic (CZE)	1:27:29
27	Michele Didoni	Italy (ITA)	1:27:38
28	Igor Lyubomirov	Russia (RUS)	1:27:42
29	Antony Gillet	France (FRA)	1:27:43
30	Miloš Holuša	Czech Republic (CZE)	1:27:48
31	Jimmy McDonald	Ireland (IRL)	1:27:49
32	Gintaras Andriuškevičius	Lithuania (LIT)	1:27:54
33	Sérgio Vieira	Portugal (POR)	1:28:40
34	Waldemar Dudek	Poland (POL)	1:28:49
35	Tomáš Kratochvíl	Czech Republic (CZE)	1:29:08
36	Augusto Cardoso	Portugal (POR)	1:29:13
37	Arvydas Vainauskas	Lithuania (LIT)	1:30:00
38	Michael Casey	Ireland (IRL)	1:30:37
39	João Vieira	Portugal (POR)	1:31:35
40	Pierce O'Callaghan	Ireland (IRL)	1:31:51
41	Eddy Riva	France (FRA)	1:32:33
42	Christian Gundersen	Norway (NOR)	1:32:44
43	Trond Nymark	Norway (NOR)	1:32:48
44	Bobby O'Leary	Ireland (IRL)	1:33:50
45	Aigars Salenieks	Latvia (LAT)	1:35:11
46	Sergeys Lapsa	Latvia (LAT)	1:36:04
47	Pedro Martins	Portugal (POR)	1:38:29
—	Aigars Fadejevs	Latvia (LAT)	DNF
—	Franks Kostyukevich	Belarus (BLR)	DNF
—	Nischan Daimer	Germany (GER)	DNF
—	Vladimir Stankin	Russia (RUS)	DNF
—	Viktoras Meškauskas	Lithuania (LIT)	DNF

==== Team (Men) ====
Place	Country	Points
1st place, gold medalist(s)	Spain	439 pts
2nd place, silver medalist(s)	Russia	410 pts
3rd place, bronze medalist(s)	Italy	410 pts
4	Slovakia	409 pts
5	France	407 pts
6	Poland	401 pts
7	Belarus	394 pts
8	Czech Republic	390 pts
9	Lithuania	374 pts
10	Latvia	355 pts
11	Portugal	353 pts
12	Norway	352 pts
13	Ireland	352 pts
14	Denmark	135 pts

=== Men's 50 km ===
Place	Athlete	Nation	Time
1st place, gold medalist(s)	Jesús Ángel García	Spain (ESP)	3:51:01
2nd place, silver medalist(s)	Arturo Di Mezza	Italy (ITA)	3:52:36
3rd place, bronze medalist(s)	Stanisław Stosik	Poland (POL)	3:54:35
4	Basilio Labrador	Spain (ESP)	3:56:32
5	Orazio Romanzi	Italy (ITA)	4:01:30
6	Oleg Merlukov	Russia (RUS)	4:02:12
7	Paolo Bianchi	Italy (ITA)	4:06:16
8	Pavel Vasilyev	Russia (RUS)	4:07:56
9	Andrés Marín	Spain (ESP)	4:11:52
10	Sylvain Caudron	France (FRA)	4:11.57
11	Daugvinas Zujus	Lithuania (LIT)	4:14:14
12	Denis Terraz	France (FRA)	4:18:15
13	Roman Bencik	Slovakia (SVK)	4:20:40
14	José Urbano	Portugal (POR)	4:23:28
15	Peter Korčok	Slovakia (SVK)	4:23:41
16	José Magalhães	Portugal (POR)	4:26:23
17	Aleksandr Artsybashev	Russia (RUS)	4:26:48
18	Miloš Mojžiš	Slovakia (SVK)	4:27:22
19	Christophe Cousin	France (FRA)	4:27:47
20	Luis Ribeiro	Portugal (POR)	4:47:32
21	José Pinto	Portugal (POR)	4:47:32
22	Andrey Popov	Russia (RUS)	4:48.28
—	Luc Nicque	Belgium (BEL)	DNF
—	Pascal Servanty	France (FRA)	DNF
—	Dirk Nicque	Belgium (BEL)	DNF
—	Oscar Font	Spain (ESP)	DNF
—	Kazimír Verkin	Slovakia (SVK)	DNF
—	Massimo Fizialetti	Italy (ITA)	DNF

==== Team (Men) ====
Place	Country	Points
1st place, gold medalist(s)	Spain	437 pts
2nd place, silver medalist(s)	Italy	436 pts
3rd place, bronze medalist(s)	Russia	419 pts
4	France	409 pts
5	Slovakia	404 pts
6	Portugal	400 pts
7	Poland	147 pts
8	Lithuania	139 pts

==== Team (Men) Combined ====
Place	Country	Points
1st place, gold medalist(s)	Spain	876 pts
2nd place, silver medalist(s)	Italy	846 pts
3rd place, bronze medalist(s)	Russia	829 pts
4	France	819 pts
5	Slovakia	813 pts
6	Portugal	753 pts
7	Poland	548 pts
8	Lithuania	513 pts
9	Belarus	394 pts
10	Czech Republic	390 pts
11	Latvia	355 pts
12	Ireland	352 pts
13	Norway	352 pts
14	Denmark	135 pts

=== Women's 10 km ===
Place	Athlete	Nation	Time
1st place, gold medalist(s)	Annarita Sidoti	Italy (ITA)	43:26
2nd place, silver medalist(s)	Rossella Giordano	Italy (ITA)	43:27
3rd place, bronze medalist(s)	Susana Feitor	Portugal (POR)	43:41
4	Katarzyna Radtke	Poland (POL)	43:45
5	Elisabetta Perrone	Italy (ITA)	44.23
6	Valentina Tsybulskaya	Belarus (BLR)	44:35
7	Erica Alfridi	Italy (ITA)	44:49
8	Olga Kardopoltseva	Belarus (BLR)	44:59
9	Rimma Makarova	Russia (RUS)	45:02
10	Marta Żukowska	Poland (POL)	45.08
11	Nina Aliushenko	Russia (RUS)	45:15
12	Svetlana Nifontova	Russia (RUS)	45:33
13	María Vasco	Spain (ESP)	45.39
14	Anita Liepiņa	Latvia (LAT)	45:43
15	Yuliya Voyevodina	Russia (RUS)	46:30
16	Deirdre Gallagher	Ireland (IRL)	46.33
17	Kjersti Plätzer	Norway (NOR)	46.40
18	Nathalie Fortain	France (FRA)	46:46
19	Anne-Catherine Berthonnaud	France (FRA)	46.48
20	Beata Betlej	Spain (ESP)	46:50
21	Celia Marcén	Spain (ESP)	47:00
22	Leonarda Yukhnevich	Belarus (BLR)	47:05
23	Lyudmila Dolgopolova	Belarus (BLR)	47.25
24	Nora Leksir	France (FRA)	47:34
25	Hanne Liland	Norway (NOR)	47:58
26	Isilda Gonçalves	Portugal (POR)	48:10
27	Fatiha Ouali	France (FRA)	49:03
28	Anne Perttola	Finland (FIN)	50:09
29	Bożena Górecka	Poland (POL)	49:24
30	Sofia Avoila	Portugal (POR)	50:08
31	Kaisa Suhonen	Finland (FIN)	50:09
32	Tarja Jaskari	Finland (FIN)	50:20
33	Gillian O'Sullivan	Ireland (IRL)	50:31
34	Olive Loughnane	Ireland (IRL)	50.41
35	Anne Simonsen	Norway (NOR)	50:53
36	Ligia Gonçalves	Portugal (POR)	51.04
37	Gražina Kiliūtė	Lithuania (LIT)	53:18
38	Marie Walsh	Ireland (IRL)	54:42
—	Kristina Saltanovič	Lithuania (LIT)	DNF
—	Encarna Granados	Spain (ESP)	DNF
—	Sonata Milušauskaitė	Lithuania (LIT)	DNF

==== Team (Women) ====
Place	Country	Points
1st place, gold medalist(s)	Italy	443 pts
2nd place, silver medalist(s)	Russia	421 pts
3rd place, bronze medalist(s)	Belarus	417 pts
4	Poland	412 pts
5	Spain	401 pts
6	Portugal	398 pts
7	France	396 pts
8	Norway	382 pts
9	Ireland	377 pts
10	Finland	371 pts
11	Latvia	137 pts
12	Lithuania	118 pts

== Participation ==
The participation of 121 athletes (80 men/41 women) from 17 countries is reported.

- Belgium (2)
- Belarus (8)
- Czech Republic (4)
- Denmark (1)
- Spain (12)
- Finland (3)
- France (12)
- Germany (1)
- Ireland (8)
- Italy (12)
- Latvia (5)
- Lithuania (8)
- Norway (6)
- Poland (7)
- Portugal (12)
- Russia (12)
- Slovakia (8)
