= 1994 European Athletics Indoor Championships – Women's 3000 metres walk =

The women's 3000 metres walk event at the 1994 European Athletics Indoor Championships was held in Palais Omnisports de Paris-Bercy on 11 March. This was the last time that this event was contested at the European Athletics Indoor Championships.

== Medalists ==
Gold	Silver	Bronze
Annarita Sidoti; Italy	Beate Gummelt; Germany	Yelena Arshintseva; Russia

== Results ==
=== Heats ===
First 4 from each heat (Q) and the next 4 fastest (q) qualified for the final.

Rank	Heat	Name	Nationality	Time	Notes
1	1	Annarita Sidoti	Italy	12:29.89	Q
2	2	Beate Gummelt	Germany	12:29.99	Q
3	1	Yelena Nikolayeva	Russia	12:30.02	Q
4	1	Sari Essayah	Finland	12:30.12	Q
5	1	Kathrin Born-Boyde	Germany	12:30.23	Q
6	1	Kamila Holpuchová	Czech Republic	12:30.24	q
7	2	Yelena Arshintseva	Russia	12:36.94	Q
8	2	Elisabetta Perrone	Italy	12:37.01	Q
9	2	Olga Leonenko	Ukraine	12:38.08	Q
10	1	Leonarda Yukhnevich	Belarus	12:39.65	q
11	2	Norica Cîmpean	Romania	12:41.40	q
12	2	Rossella Giordano	Italy	12:42.65	q
13	2	Yulia Lisnik	Moldova	13:10.43	NR
14	1	Zuzana Zemková	Slovakia	13:13.94	
15	2	Nathalie Fortain	France	13:16.48	
16	1	Nevena Mineva	Bulgaria	13:42.00	
17	2	Kada Delić	Bosnia and Herzegovina	14:14.25	
	1	Katarzyna Radtke	Poland	DQ	
	2	Susana Feitor	Portugal	DQ	

=== Final ===
Rank	Name	Nationality	Time	Notes
1st place, gold medalist(s)	Annarita Sidoti	Italy	11:54.32	
2nd place, silver medalist(s)	Beate Gummelt	Germany	11:56.01	
3rd place, bronze medalist(s)	Yelena Arshintseva	Russia	11:57.48	
4	Yelena Nikolayeva	Russia	11:57.49	
5	Leonarda Yukhnevich	Belarus	12:04.46	NR
6	Sari Essayah	Finland	12:12.80	
7	Olga Leonenko	Ukraine	12:20.44	
8	Kathrin Born-Boyde	Germany	12:21.63	
9	Norica Cîmpean	Romania	12:24.04	
10	Kamila Holpuchová	Czech Republic	12:30.87	
11	Rossella Giordano	Italy	12:35.98	
	Elisabetta Perrone	Italy	DQ	
