= 1991 IAAF World Indoor Championships – Women's 3000 metres walk =

The women's 3000 metres walk event at the 1991 IAAF World Indoor Championships was held on 8 and 10 March.

== Medalists ==
Gold	Silver	Bronze
Beate Anders; Germany	Kerry Saxby; Australia	Ileana Salvador; Italy

== Results ==
=== Heats ===
Rank	Heat	Name	Nationality	Time	Notes
1	1	Ileana Salvador	Italy	12:33.23	Q
2	1	Yelena Nikolayeva	Soviet Union	12:34.73	Q
3	1	Beate Anders	Germany	12:35.27	Q
4	1	Olga Sánchez	Spain	12:47.80	Q
5	2	Annarita Sidoti	Italy	13:05.10	Q
6	2	Olga Kardopoltseva	Soviet Union	13:05.43	Q
7	2	Kathrin Born	Germany	13:05.47	Q
8	1	Zuzana Zemková	Czechoslovakia	13:05.89	Q
9	2	Kerry Saxby	Australia	13:06.38	Q
10	1	Victoria Herazo	United States	13:15.99	Q
11	2	Emilia Cano	Spain	13:16.06	Q
12	2	Miriam Ramón	Ecuador	13:25.13	Q, AR
13	2	Alison Baker	Canada	13:53.21	
	1	Sari Essayah	Finland	DQ	
	1	Janice McCaffrey	Canada	DQ	
	1	Mária Rosza	Hungary	DQ	
	1	Viera Toporek	Austria	DQ	
	2	Kamila Holpuchová	Czechoslovakia	DQ	
	2	Ildikó Ilyés	Hungary	DQ	

=== Final ===
Rank	Name	Nationality	Time	Notes
1st place, gold medalist(s)	Beate Anders	Germany	11:50.90	WR
2nd place, silver medalist(s)	Kerry Saxby	Australia	12:03.21	
3rd place, bronze medalist(s)	Ileana Salvador	Italy	12:07.67	NR
4	Olga Kardopoltseva	Soviet Union	12:07.70	PB
5	Yelena Nikolayeva	Soviet Union	12:09.60	PB
6	Emilia Cano	Spain	12:40.87	PB
7	Olga Sánchez	Spain	12:54.40	
8	Zuzana Zemková	Czechoslovakia	12:59.85	
9	Victoria Herazo	United States	13:09.90	
10	Miriam Ramón	Ecuador	13:24.95	AR
	Annarita Sidoti	Italy	DQ	
	Kathrin Born	Germany	DQ	
