= 1990 European Athletics Indoor Championships – Women's 3000 metres walk =

The women's 3000 metres walk event at the 1990 European Athletics Indoor Championships was held in Kelvin Hall on 3 and 4 March.

== Medalists ==
Gold	Silver	Bronze
Beate Anders; East Germany	Ileana Salvador; Italy	Annarita Sidoti; Italy

== Results ==
=== Heats ===
First 4 from each heat (Q) and the next 4 fastest (q) qualified for the final.

Rank	Heat	Name	Nationality	Time	Notes
1	2	Ileana Salvador	Italy	12:49.73	Q
2	2	Vera Makolova	Soviet Union	12:50.66	Q
3	1	Beate Anders	East Germany	12:53.01	Q
4	2	Pier Carola Pagani	Italy	12:54.24	Q
5	2	Anikó Szebenszky	Hungary	12:54.75	Q
6	1	Olga Krishtop	Soviet Union	12:57.68	Q
7	1	Annarita Sidoti	Italy	12:58.29	Q
8	1	Ildikó Ilyés	Hungary	12:58.97	Q
9	2	Dana Vavřačová	Czechoslovakia	13:00.09	q
10	1	Andrea Brückmann	West Germany	13:01.13	q
11	1	Victoria Oprea	Romania	13:02.32	q
12	2	Zuzana Zemková	Czechoslovakia	13:13.39	q
13	2	Vera Toporek	Austria	13:16.61	
14	1	Kamila Holpuchová	Czechoslovakia	13:22.75	
15	1	Teresa Palacios	Spain	13:46.21	
16	1	Sylvia Black	Great Britain	13:55.52	
17	2	Kalliopi Gavalaki	Greece	13:59.35	

=== Final ===
Rank	Name	Nationality	Time	Notes
1st place, gold medalist(s)	Beate Anders	East Germany	11:59.36	WR
2nd place, silver medalist(s)	Ileana Salvador	Italy	12:18.84	
3rd place, bronze medalist(s)	Annarita Sidoti	Italy	12:27.94	
4	Dana Vavřačová	Czechoslovakia	12:28.76	
5	Ildikó Ilyés	Hungary	12:31.41	
6	Andrea Brückmann	West Germany	12:33.30	
7	Anikó Szebenszky	Hungary	12:38.14	
8	Victoria Oprea	Romania	12:44.96	
9	Pier Carola Pagani	Italy	12:48.10	
10	Zuzana Zemková	Czechoslovakia	13:10.85	
	Vera Makolova	Soviet Union	DQ	
	Olga Krishtop	Soviet Union	DQ	
