= 1992 European Athletics Indoor Championships – Women's 3000 metres walk =

The women's 3000 metres walk event at the 1992 European Athletics Indoor Championships was held in Palasport di Genova on 28 February and 29 February.

== Medalists ==
Gold	Silver	Bronze
Alina Ivanova; Unified Team	Ileana Salvador; Italy	Beate Gummelt; Germany

== Results ==
=== Heats ===
First 4 from each heat (Q) and the next 4 fastest (q) qualified for the final.

Rank	Heat	Name	Nationality	Time	Notes
1	1	Madelein Svensson	Sweden	12:25.83	Q
2	1	Beate Gummelt	Germany	12:26.14	Q
3	1	Alina Ivanova	Unified Team	12:26.15	Q
4	1	Annarita Sidoti	Italy	12:27.42	Q
5	1	Pier Carola Pagani	Italy	12:30.35	q
6	2	Ileana Salvador	Italy	12:41.94	Q
7	1	Simone Thust	Germany	12:43.00	q
8	2	Sada Eidikytė	Lithuania	12:43.20	Q
9	2	Victoria Lina	Romania	12:46.99	Q
10	2	Yelena Sayko	Unified Team	12:48.25	Q
11	2	Andrea Brückmann	Germany	12:48.51	q
12	1	Beata Kaczmarska	Poland	12:52.18	q
	1	Nathalie Marchand	France	DQ	
	2	Vera Toporek	Austria	DQ	
	2	Katarzyna Radtke	Poland	DQ	
	2	Anikó Szebenszky	Hungary	DQ	

=== Final ===
Rank	Name	Nationality	Time	Notes
1st place, gold medalist(s)	Alina Ivanova	Unified Team	11:49.99	CR
2nd place, silver medalist(s)	Ileana Salvador	Italy	11:53.23	NR
3rd place, bronze medalist(s)	Beate Gummelt	Germany	11:55.41	
4	Annarita Sidoti	Italy	12:04.51	
5	Victoria Lina	Romania	12:10.43	
6	Sada Eidikytė	Lithuania	12:13.67	NR
7	Yelena Sayko	Unified Team	12:14.68	
8	Pier Carola Pagani	Italy	12:14.74	
9	Andrea Brückmann	Germany	12:29.87	
10	Simone Thust	Germany	12:36.78	
11	Beata Kaczmarska	Poland	12:43.91	
	Madelein Svensson	Sweden	DQ	
