= Athletics at the 1995 Summer Universiade – Women's 10 kilometres walk =

The women's 10 kilometres walk event at the 1995 Summer Universiade was held on 2 September in Fukuoka, Japan.

== Results ==
Rank	Athlete	Nationality	Time	Notes
1st place, gold medalist(s)	Annarita Sidoti	Italy	43:22	
2nd place, silver medalist(s)	Rossella Giordano	Italy	43:30	
3rd place, bronze medalist(s)	Larisa Ramazanova	Russia	43:56	
4	Susana Feitor	Portugal	44:05	
5	Beate Gummelt	Germany	44:18	
6	Nina Alyushenko	Russia	44:21	
7	Li Jingxue	China	45:08	
8	Emi Hayashi	Japan	45:19	
9	Yelena Sayko	Russia	45:38	
10	Valentina Tsybulskaya	Belarus	46:18	
11	?	?	46:24	
12	Song Lijuan	China	46:48	
13	Deirdre Gallagher	Ireland	48:00	
14	Josephine Strangman	Australia	48:59	
15	Rachel Robichaud	Canada	50:16	
16	Celia Marcén	Spain	50:56	
17	Susan Armenta	United States	51:24	
18	Aida Isayeva	Azerbaijan	53:05	
19	Gretchen Eastler	United States	54:31	
20	Mimoza Xhafa	Albania	1:00:57	
