= 1990 in race walking =

This page lists the World Best Year Performance in the year 1990 in both the men's and the women's race walking distances: 10 km, 20 km and 50 km (outdoor).

== Abbreviations ==
- All times shown are in hours:minutes:seconds

WR	world record
AR	area record
CR	event record
NR	national record
PB	personal best

== Men's 20 km ==
=== Records ===
Standing records prior to the 1990 season in track and field
World record	Yevgeniy Misyulya (URS)	1:18:54	February 19, 1989	Sochi, Soviet Union
Broken records during the 1990 season in track and field
World record	Andrey Perlov (URS)	1:18:20	May 26, 1990	Moscow, Soviet Union
World record	Pavol Blažek (TCH)	1:18:13	September 16, 1990	Hildesheim, West Germany

=== 1990 World Year Ranking ===
Rank	Time	Athlete	Venue	Date	Note
1	1:18:13	Pavol Blažek (TCH)	Hildesheim, West Germany	16 September 1990	WR
2	1:18:20	Andrey Perlov (URS)	Moscow, Soviet Union	16 September 1990	NR
3	1:18:37	Aleksandr Pershin (URS)	Moscow, Soviet Union	26 May 1990	
4	1:18:51	Frants Kostyukevich (URS)	Moscow, Soviet Union	26 May 1990	
5	1:18:56	Grigoriy Kornev (URS)			
6	1:19:07	Mikhail Shchennikov (URS)			
7	1:19:21	Vladimir Andreyev (URS)			
8	1:19:32	Robert Korzeniowski (POL)			NR
9	1:19:33	Nicholas A'Hern (AUS)	Melbourne, Australia	15 December 1990	
10	1:19:39	Aleksey Pershin (URS)	Moscow, Soviet Union	26 May 1990	
11	1:19:50	Carlos Mercenario (MEX)			
12	1:19:58	Oleg Troshin (URS)			
13	1:20:07	Michail Orlov (URS)			
14	1:20:15	Yevgeniy Misyulya (URS)			
15	1:20:21	Roman Mrázek (TCH)			
16	1:20:28	Robert Ihly (FRG)			
17	1:20:37	Igor Kollár (TCH)			
18	1:20:43	Andrew Jachno (AUS)			
19	1:20:45	Igor Plotnikov (URS)			
20	1:20:50	Anatoliy Grigoryev (URS)			

== Men's 50 km ==
=== Records ===
Standing records prior to the 1990 season in track and field
World record	Andrey Perlov (URS)	3:37:41	August 5, 1989	Leningrad, Soviet Union

=== 1990 World Year Ranking ===
Rank	Time	Athlete	Venue	Date	Note
1	3:40:02	Aleksandr Potashov (URS)			
2	3:40:07	Andrey Plotnikov (URS)			
3	3:42:00	Stanislav Veshel (URS)			
4	3:44:45	Aleksey Volgin (URS)			
5	3:44:50	Ronald Weigel (GDR)			
6	3:46:43	Bernd Gummelt (GDR)			
7	3:46:51	Maurizio Damilano (ITA)			
8	3:47:08	Hartwig Gauder (GDR)			
9	3:47:12	Vityliy Popovich (URS)			
10	3:48:27	Modris Liepiņš (URS)			
11	3:50:05	Jorge Llopart (ESP)			
12	3:50:10	Carlos Mercenario (MEX)			
13	3:50:26	Zhai Wanbo (CHN)			NR
14	3:51:04	German Skurygin (URS)			
15	3:51:06	László Sator (HUN)			NR
16	3:51:30	Martín Bermúdez (MEX)			
17	3:51:37	Chris Maddocks (GBR)			NR
18	3:51:44	Jaroslav Makovec (TCH)			
19	3:51:47	Grzegorz Ledzion (POL)			
20	3:51:48	Andrey Perlov (URS)			

== Women's 5 km ==
=== Records ===
Standing records prior to the 1990 season in track and field
World record	Kerry Saxby (AUS)	20:34	September 24, 1987	Hildesheim, West Germany

=== 1990 World Year Ranking ===
Rank	Time	Athlete	Venue	Date	Note
1	21:22	Pier Carola Pagani (ITA)			
2	21:25	Mária Urbanik (HUN)			NR
3	21:37	Sari Essayah (FIN)			NR
4	21:38	Victoria Oprea (ROM)			NR
5	21:40	Vera Mokolova (URS)			
6	21:49	Monica Gunnarsson (SWE)			
7	21:50	Elisabeth Sworowski (GBR)			NR
8	21:50	Maria Reyes Sobrino (ESP)			
9	21:53	María Colín (MEX)			NR
10	21:56	Andrea Brückmann (FRG)			
11	21:57	Yelena Panfilova (URS)			
12	21:59	Franziska Martínez (MEX)			
13	22:15	Olga Sánchez (ESP)			
14	22:17	Dana Vavřačová (TCH)			NR

== Women's 10 km ==
=== Records ===
Standing records prior to the 1990 season in track and field
World record	Kerry Saxby-Junna (AUS)	41:30	August 27, 1988	Canberra, Australia

=== 1990 World Year Ranking ===
Rank	Time	Athlete	Venue	Date	Note
1	41:58	Kerry Saxby-Junna (AUS)			
2	42:30	Beate Anders (GDR)			
3	42:46	Tamara Kovalenko (URS)			
4	43:08	Olga Kardopoltseva (URS)			
5	43:11	Olga Krishtop (URS)			
6	43:13	Natalya Spiridonova (URS)			
7	43:40	Tamara Surovzeva (URS)			
8	43:47	Sari Essayah (FIN)			NR
9	43:52	Irina Tolstik (URS)			
10	44:00	Annarita Sidoti (ITA)			
11	44:02	Lidiya Fessenko (URS)			
12	44:04	Yelena Sayko (URS)			
13	44:13	Tatyana Ragosina (URS)			
14	44:16	Maria Reyes Sobrino (ESP)			NR
15	44:34	Marina Smyslova (URS)			
16	44:37	Alina Ivanova (URS)			
17	44:38	Ileana Salvador (ITA)			
18	44:38	Nina Alyushenko (URS)			
19	44:39	Natalya Misyuliya (URS)			
20	44:47	Chen Yueling (CHN)			
