= 1995 World Championships in Athletics – Women's 10 kilometres walk =

These are the official results of the Women's 10 km Walk event at the 1995 World Championships held on Monday 7 August 1995 in Gothenburg, Sweden. There were a total number of 45 participating athletes.

== Medalists ==
Gold	Irina Stankina; Russia (RUS)
Silver	Elisabetta Perrone; Italy (ITA)
Bronze	Yelena Nikolayeva; Russia (RUS)

== Abbreviations ==
- All times shown are in hours:minutes:seconds

DNS	did not start
NM	no mark
WR	world record
WL	world leading
AR	area record
NR	national record
PB	personal best
SB	season best

== Final ranking ==
Rank	Athlete	Time	Note
1st place, gold medalist(s)	Irina Stankina (RUS)	42:13	
2nd place, silver medalist(s)	Elisabetta Perrone (ITA)	42:16	
3rd place, bronze medalist(s)	Yelena Nikolayeva (RUS)	42:20	
4	Sari Essayah (FIN)	42:20	
5	Larisa Ramazanova (RUS)	42:25	
6	Rossella Giordano (ITA)	42:26	
7	Mária Urbanik (HUN)	42:34	
8	Liu Hongyu (CHN)	42:46	
9	Kerry Saxby-Junna (AUS)	43:06	
10	Beate Gummelt (GER)	43:15	
11	Gu Yan (CHN)	43:27	
12	Valentina Tsybulskaya (BLR)	43:34	
13	Annarita Sidoti (ITA)	44:06	
14	Olga Kardopoltseva (BLR)	44:07	
15	Michelle Rohl (USA)	44:17	
16	Encarna Granados (ESP)	44:19	
17	Susana Feitor (POR)	44:25	
18	Nataliya Misyulya (BLR)	44:27	
19	Graciela Mendoza (MEX)	44:44	
20	Norica Câmpean (ROM)	44:46	
21	Tina Poitras (CAN)	45:02	
22	Teresa Vaill (USA)	45:02	
23	Anikó Szebenszky (HUN)	45:03	
24	Debbi Lawrence (USA)	45:03	
25	Miriam Ramón (ECU)	45:04	
26	María Vasco (ESP)	45:05	
27	Anita Liepina (LAT)	45:12	
28	Maya Sazonova (KAZ)	45:13	
29	Simone Thust (GER)	45:24	
30	Janice McCaffrey (CAN)	45:41	
31	Francisca Martínez (MEX)	45:55	
32	Sonata Milušauskaitė (LTU)	45:55	
33	Deirdre Gallagher (IRL)	46:00	
34	Anne Manning (AUS)	46:04	
35	Lisa Langford (GBR)	46:06	
36	Marta Żukowska (POL)	46:14	
37	Rosario Sánchez (MEX)	46:54	
38	Kamila Holpuchová (CZE)	47:12	
39	Kada Delić (BIH)	47:43	
40	Kjersti Plätzer (NOR)	47:57	
41	Giovanna Morejon (BOL)	48:18	
DID NOT FINISH (DNF)
—	Tatyana Ragozina (UKR)	DNF	
DISQUALIFIED (DSQ)
—	Katarzyna Radtke (POL)	DSQ	
—	Gao Hongmiao (CHN)	DSQ	
—	Kathrin Born-Boyde (GER)	DSQ	

== See also ==
- 1992 Women's Olympic 10km Walk (Barcelona)
- 1993 Women's World Championships 10km Walk (Stuttgart)
- 1994 Women's European Championships 10km Walk (Helsinki)
- 1996 Women's Olympic 10km Walk (Atlanta)
- 1997 Women's World Championships 10km Walk (Athens)
- 1998 Women's European Championships 10km Walk (Budapest)
