= 1999 World Championships in Athletics – Women's 20 kilometres walk =

The official results of the Women's 20 km Walk at the 1999 World Championships in Sevilla, Spain, held on Friday 27 August 1999, starting at 18:50h local time.

== Medalists ==
Gold	Liu Hongyu; PR China (CHN)
Silver	Wang Yan; PR China (CHN)
Bronze	Kerry Saxby-Junna; Australia (AUS)

== Abbreviations ==
- All times shown are in hours:minutes:seconds

DNS	did not start
NM	no mark
WR	world record
WL	world leading
AR	area record
NR	national record
PB	personal best
SB	season best

== Records ==
Standing records prior to the 1999 World Athletics Championships
World Record	Liu Hongyu (CHN)	1:27:30	May 1, 1995	Beijing, PR China
World Record	Nadezhda Ryashkina (RUS)	1:27:30	February 7, 1999	Adler, Russia
Event Record	New Event			
Broken records during the 1999 World Athletics Championships
Event Record	Liu Hongyu (CHN)	1:30.50	August 27, 1999	Seville, Spain

== Intermediates ==
Rank	Number	Athlete	Time
10 KILOMETRES
1	547	Annarita Sidoti (ITA)	46:06
2	163	Liu Hongyu (CHN)	46:07
3	723	Kjersti Tysse Plätzer (NOR)	46:07
4	762	Susana Feitor (POR)	46:07
5	41	Kerry Saxby-Junna (AUS)	46:07
15 KILOMETRES
1	163	Liu Hongyu (CHN)	1:08:39
2	762	Susana Feitor (POR)	1:08:40
3	169	Wang Yan (CHN)	1:08:40
4	829	Natalya Fedoskina (RUS)	1:08:40
5	40	Jane Saville (AUS)	1:08:40

== Final ranking ==
Rank	Athlete	Time	Note
1st place, gold medalist(s)	Liu Hongyu (CHN)	1:30:50	CR
2nd place, silver medalist(s)	Wang Yan (CHN)	1:30:52	
3rd place, bronze medalist(s)	Kerry Saxby-Junna (AUS)	1:31:18	SB
4	Susana Feitor (POR)	1:31:23	
5	Katarzyna Radtke (POL)	1:31:34	
6	Erica Alfridi (ITA)	1:32:04	
7	Jane Saville (AUS)	1:32:13	
8	Maya Sazonova (KAZ)	1:32:19	
9	Kjersti Tysse Plätzer (NOR)	1:32:42	
10	María Vasco (ESP)	1:33:35	
11	Claudia Iovan (ROM)	1:33:46	
12	Yelena Nikolayeva (RUS)	1:34:10	
13	Christina Deskou (GRE)	1:34:39	
14	Nataliya Misyulya (BLR)	1:35:03	
15	Gao Hingmiao (CHN)	1:35:07	
16	Yuan Yufang (MAS)	1:35:31	
17	Irina Stankina (RUS)	1:35:42	
18	Kristina Saltanovič (LTU)	1:35:51	
19	Svetlana Tolstaya (KAZ)	1:35:54	
20	Nora Leksir (FRA)	1:36:17	
21	Elisabetta Perrone (ITA)	1:36:24	
22	Mária Urbanik (HUN)	1:36:48	
23	Fatiha Ouali (FRA)	1:36:57	
24	Yuka Mitsumori (JPN)	1:37:13	
25	María Guadalupe Sánchez (MEX)	1:37:31	
26	Teresa Linares (ESP)	1:37:51	
27	Rossella Giordano (ITA)	1:38:06	
28	Anikó Szebenszky (HUN)	1:38:27	
29	Jolanta Dukure (LAT)	1:38:34	
30	Sonata Milušauskaitė (LTU)	1:39:56	
31	Susan Armenta (USA)	1:40:20	
32	Gillian O'Sullivan (IRL)	1:40:33	
33	Melanie Seeger (GER)	1:40:51	
34	Rosario Sánchez (MEX)	1:41:04	
35	Teresita Collado (GUA)	1:41:12	
36	Geovana Irusta (BOL)	1:41:17	
37	Christina Kokotou (GRE)	1:42:50	
38	Danielle Kirk (USA)	1:43:27	
39	Kim Mi-Jung (PRK)	1:46:36	
DISQUALIFIED (DSQ)
	Joanne Dow (USA)	DSQ	
	Ivis Haydee Martinez (ESA)	DSQ	
	Natalya Fedoskina (RUS)	DSQ	
	Olga Kardopoltseva (BLR)	DSQ	
	Graciela Mendoza (MEX)	DSQ	
DID NOT FINISH (DNF)
	Norica Câmpean (ROM)	DNF	
	Larisa Ramazanova (BLR)	DNF	
	Susan Vermeulen (RSA)	DNF	
	Valentyna Savchuk (UKR)	DNF	
	Mónika Pesti (HUN)	DNF	
	Annarita Sidoti (ITA)	DNF	
	Celia Marcén (ESP)	DNF	
DID NOT START (DNS)
	Miriam Ramón (ECU)	DNS	

== See also ==
- 1996 Women's Olympic 10km Walk (Atlanta)
- 1998 Women's European Championships 10km Walk (Budapest)
- 1999 Race Walking Year Ranking
- 2000 Women's Olympic 20km Walk (Sydney)
- 2002 Women's European Championships 20km Walk (Munich)
