= 1998 European Athletics Championships – Women's 10 kilometres walk =

Women's 10 kilometres walk at the European Athletics Championships

These are the official results of the Women's 10 km walk event at the 1998 European Championships in Budapest, Hungary. The event was held on August 20, 1998.

== Medalists ==
Gold	Annarita Sidoti; Italy (ITA)
Silver	Erica Alfridi; Italy (ITA)
Bronze	Susana Feitor; Portugal (POR)

== Abbreviations ==
- All times shown are in hours:minutes:seconds

DNS	did not start
NM	no mark
WR	world record
AR	area record
NR	national record
PB	personal best
SB	season best

== Records ==
Standing records prior to the 1998 European Athletics Championships
World Record	Yelena Nikolayeva (RUS)	41.04	April 20, 1996	Sochi, Russia
Event Record	Sari Essayah (FIN)	42.37	August 9, 1994	Helsinki, Finland

== Final ranking ==
Rank	Athlete	Time	Note
1st place, gold medalist(s)	Annarita Sidoti (ITA)	42:49	SB
2nd place, silver medalist(s)	Erica Alfridi (ITA)	42:54	SB
3rd place, bronze medalist(s)	Susana Feitor (POR)	42:55	NR
4	Mária Urbanik (HUN)	42:59	SB
5	María Vasco (ESP)	43:02	NR
6	Katarzyna Radtke (POL)	43:09	SB
7	Nadezhda Ryashkina (RUS)	43:37	
8	Olga Kardopoltseva (BLR)	43:38	
9	Kjersti Plätzer (NOR)	43:49	NR
10	Nataliya Misyulya (BLR)	43:55	
11	Elisabetta Perrone (ITA)	44:04	
12	Claudia Iovan (ROM)	44:10	
13	Tatyana Ragozina (UKR)	44:17	
14	Ildikó Ilyés (HUN)	44:52	
15	Valentina Tsybulskaya (BLR)	45:22	
16	Celia Marcen (ESP)	45:34	
17	Nora Leksir (FRA)	45:38	SB
18	Lisa Kehler (GBR)	45:42	
19	Yolanta Dukure (LAT)	45:51	
20	Denise Friedenberger (GER)	46:18	
21	Sonata Milušauskaitė (LTU)	46:32	
22	Olga Panfyorova (RUS)	47:20	
23	Gillian O'Sullivan (IRL)	48:24	
24	Hanne Liland (NOR)	48:57	
DISQUALIFIED (DSQ)
—	Vera Nacharkina (RUS)	DSQ	
—	Kathrin Born-Boyde (GER)	DSQ	
—	Anikó Szebenszky (HUN)	DSQ	
—	Norica Câmpean (ROM)	DSQ	
DID NOT FINISH (DNF)
—	Melanie Seeger (GER)	DNF	
—	Anita Liepina (LAT)	DNF	
—	Encarna Granados (ESP)	DNF	

== See also ==
- 1995 Women's World Championships 10 km walk (Gothenburg)
- 1996 Women's Olympic 10 km walk (Atlanta)
- 1997 Women's World Championships 10 km walk (Athens)
- 1998 Race Walking Year Ranking
- 1999 Women's World Championships 10 km walk (Seville)
- 2000 Women's Olympic 20 km walk (Sydney)
- 2001 Women's World Championships 20 km walk (Edmonton)
