= 1988 European Athletics Indoor Championships – Women's 3000 metres walk =

The women's 3000 metres walk event at the 1988 European Athletics Indoor Championships was held on 6 March.

== Results ==
Rank	Name	Nationality	Time	Notes
1st place, gold medalist(s)	María Reyes Sobrino	Spain	12:48.99	CR
2nd place, silver medalist(s)	Dana Vavřačová	Czechoslovakia	12:51.08	
3rd place, bronze medalist(s)	Mari Cruz Díaz	Spain	12:55.03	
4	Ildikó Ilyés	Hungary	12:56.55	
5	Mária Rosza	Hungary	13:04.45	
6	Natalya Spiridonova	Soviet Union	13:08.83	
7	Ann Jansson	Sweden	13:09.04	
8	Atanaska Dzhivkova	Bulgaria	13:18.55	
9	Sari Essayah	Finland	13:19.02	
10	Anikó Szebenszky	Hungary	13:24.68	
11	Victoria Oprea	Romania	13:28.05	
12	Lisa Kehler	Great Britain	13:32.30	
13	Emilia Cano	Spain	13:37.03	
	Sada Eidikytė	Soviet Union	DQ	
