= 1990 European Athletics Championships – Women's 10 kilometres walk =

Women's 10 kilometres walk at the European Athletics Championships

These are the official results of the Women's 10 km walk event at the 1990 European Championships in Split, Yugoslavia, held on August 29, 1990.

== Medalists ==
Gold	Annarita Sidoti; Italy (ITA)
Silver	Olga Kardopoltseva; Soviet Union (URS)
Bronze	Ileana Salvador; Italy (ITA)

== Abbreviations ==
- All times shown are in hours:minutes:seconds

DNS	did not start
NM	no mark
WR	world record
AR	area record
CR	event record
NR	national record
PB	personal best
SB	season best

== Records ==
Standing records prior to the 1990 European Athletics Championships
World Record	Kerry Saxby-Junna (AUS)	41.30	August 27, 1988	Canberra, Australia
Event Record	Mari Cruz Díaz (ESP)	46.09	August 26, 1986	Stuttgart, West Germany
Broken records during the 1990 European Athletics Championships
Event Record	Annarita Sidoti (ITA)	44.00	August 29, 1990	(Socialist Federal Republic of Yugoslavia) Split, FR Yugoslavia

== Results ==
Rank	Athlete	Time	Note
1st place, gold medalist(s)	Annarita Sidoti (ITA)	44.00	CR
2nd place, silver medalist(s)	Olga Kardopoltseva (URS)	44.06	
3rd place, bronze medalist(s)	Ileana Salvador (ITA)	44.38	
4	Tamara Kovalenko (URS)	45.03	
5	Sari Essayah (FIN)	45.10	
6	Beate Anders (GDR)	45.18	
7	María Reyes Sobrino (ESP)	45.42	
8	Monica Gunnarsson (SWE)	45.48	
9	Mária Urbanik (HUN)	45.54	
10	Lisa Langford (GBR)	46.33	
11	Emilia Cano (ESP)	46.43	
12	Pier Carola Pagani (ITA)	46.55	
13	Ildikó Ilyés (HUN)	47.17	
14	Teresa Palacio (ESP)	47.30	
15	Betty Sworowski (GBR)	47.37	
16	Anikó Szebenszky (HUN)	47.46	
17	Madelein Svensson (SWE)	48.19	
18	Nathalie Marchand (FRA)	48.28	
19	Andrea Brückmann (FRG)	48.37	
20	Julie Drake (GBR)	49.26	
21	Isilda Gonçalves (POR)	50.49	
22	Victoria Oprea (ROM)	51.38	
23	Mirva Hämäläinen (FIN)	55.52	
—	Nadezhda Ryashkina (URS)	DQ	

== Participation ==
According to an unofficial count, 24 athletes from 12 countries participated in the event.

- East Germany (1)
- Finland (2)
- France (1)
- Hungary (3)
- Italy (3)
- Portugal (1)
- Romania (1)
- Soviet Union (3)
- Spain (3)
- Sweden (2)
- United Kingdom (3)
- West Germany (1)

== See also ==
- 1987 Women's World Championships 10km Walk (Rome)
- 1991 Women's World Championships 10km Walk (Tokyo)
- 1992 Women's Olympic 10km Walk (Barcelona)
- 1993 Women's World Championships 10km Walk (Stuttgart)
