= Song Hongjuan =

Chinese race walker

Song Hongjuan (simplified Chinese: 宋红娟; traditional Chinese: 宋紅娟; pinyin: Sòng Hóngjuān; born July 4, 1984, in Jilin) is a Chinese race walker.

== Achievements ==
Year	Competition	Venue	Position	Notes
Representing China
2003	World Championships	Paris, France	DSQ	20 km
2004	Olympic Games	Athens, Greece	14th	20 km
2004	World Race Walking Cup	Naumburg, Germany	6th	20 km
2005	World Championships	Helsinki, Finland	9th	20 km
2007	World Championships	Osaka, Japan	15th	20 km
