= Anne Manning (race walker) =

Australian racewalker (born 1959)

Anne Patricia Manning (born 13 November 1959 in Brisbane, Queensland) is a retired racewalker from Australia. She set her personal best in the women's 10 kilometres (6.2 mi) race walk event (44:27) in 1996.

== Achievements ==
Year	Competition	Venue	Position	Event	Notes
Representing Australia
1994	Commonwealth Games	Victoria, British Columbia	2nd	10 km	44:37
1995	World Championships	Göteborg, Sweden	34th	10 km	46:04
1996	Olympic Games	Atlanta, United States	19th	10 km	45:27
