= Jiang Jing =

Chinese race walker

Jiang Jing (born 23 October 1985 in Jiangsu) is a Chinese race walker.

== Achievements ==
Year	Competition	Venue	Position	Notes
Representing China
2004	World Race Walking Cup	Naumburg, Germany	2nd	20 km
2004	Olympic Games	Athens, Greece	32nd	20 km
2005	World Championships	Helsinki, Finland	DSQ	20 km
