= Nathalie Fortain =

French racewalker

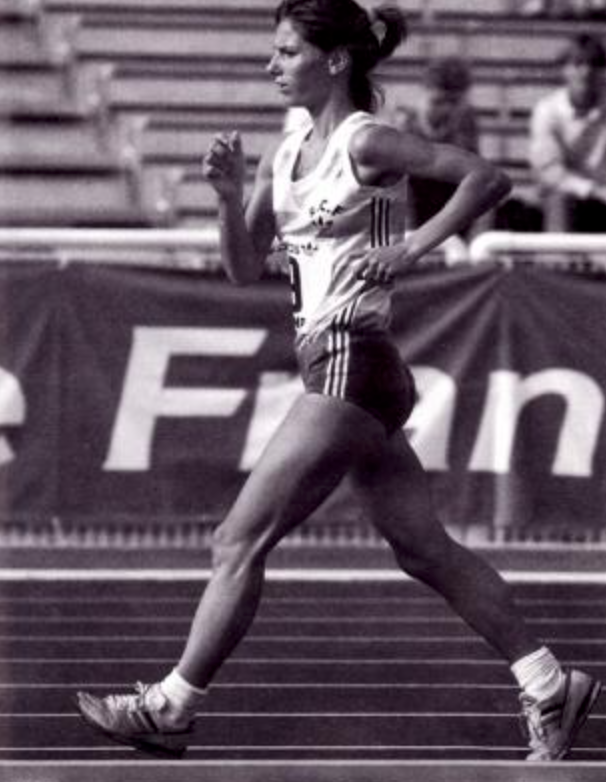
- Nathalie Fortain in 1990

Personal information
- Nationality: French
- Born: 12 July 1969 (age 57) Poitiers, France
- Height: 1.63 m (5 ft 4 in)

Sport
- Sport: Athletics
- Event: Racewalking
- Club: PEC Athlétisme

Nathalie Fortain (born 12 July 1969) is a French racewalker.

She was born in Poitiers. She finished ninth at the 1987 European Junior Championships (5000 m), sixth at the 1988 World Junior Championships in Athletics (5000 m), 18th at the 1990 European Championships, 18th at the 1996 European Race Walking Cup, 30th at the 1996 Summer Olympics and fourth at the 1997 Mediterranean Games.

She was disqualified at the 1992 European Indoor Championships and competed at the 1994 European Athletics Indoor Championships and the 1997 World Championships without reaching the final. She became French champion in 1989, 1990, 1991 and 1992.
