= Maria Grazia Orsani =

Italian racewalker (born 1969)

Personal information
- Nationality: Italian
- Born: 11 June 1969 (age 57)

Sport
- Country: Italy
- Sport: Athletics
- Event: Racewalking

Achievements and titles
- Personal bests: 5000 m walk: 22:04.74 (1988); 20 km walk: 1:38:13 (1993)
Medal record
World Junior Championships
Bronze medal – third place	1988 Sudbury	5000 m walk

Maria Grazia Orsani (born 11 June 1969) is an Italian retired racewalker, which participated at the 1987 World Championships in Athletics.

== Achievements ==
Year	Competition	Venue	Position	Event	Performance	Notes
1987	World Championships	(Italy) Rome	DNF	10 km walk	NM	
1988	World Junior Championships	(Canada) Sudbury	3rd	5000 metres walk	22:04.74	

== See also ==
- Italian team at the running events
- Italy at the IAAF World Race Walking Cup
