= Gao Hongmiao =

Chinese race walker (born 1974)

Medal record

Women's athletics

Representing China

Asian Championships
Gold medal – first place	1993 Manila	10 km walk

Gao Hongmiao (born 17 March 1974) is a Chinese race walker.

== International competitions ==
Year	Competition	Venue	Position	Event	Notes
Representing China
1992	World Junior Championships	Seoul, South Korea	1st	5000 m	21:20.03 = CR
1993	Asian Championships	Manila, Philippines	1st	10000 m	47:08.98 = CR
1994	Asian Games	Hiroshima, Japan	1st	10 km	44:11 = CR
1995	World Race Walking Cup	Beijing, China	1st	10 km	42:19 = CR
1995	World Championships	Gothenburg, Sweden	—	10 km	DSQ
1996	Olympic Games	Atlanta, United States	—	10 km	DQ
2001	Universiade	Beijing, China	1st	10 km	43:20 =CR
