= Mária Urbanik =

Hungarian racewalker

Mária Rosza-Urbanik (born 12 February 1967 in Törökszentmiklós, Jász-Nagykun-Szolnok) is a retired race walker for Hungary who competed in three consecutive Summer Olympics, starting in 1992. She married Sándor Urbanik, a fellow Hungarian race walker.

Urbanik represented Hungary at six consecutive editions of the World Athletics Championships, from 1991 to 1999, with her best result being seventh place at the 1995 World Championships in Athletics. She also competed at eight straight editions of the IAAF World Race Walking Cup, making her debut in 1987 and her final appearance in 2002. She was a silver medallist over 10 km at the 1998 European Race Walking Cup. Her best placing at a major outdoor competition was fourth, in the 10 km walk at the 1998 European Athletics Championships.

Urbanik is the Hungarian record holder over four events: 21:24.76 minutes for the 5000 m walk, 21:23+ for the 5 km walk, 44:13.76 for the 10,000 m walk, and 42:34 for the 10 km walk. She won nine national titles at the Hungarian Athletics Championships, over the 10 km and 20 km distances.

== International competitions ==
Representing Hungary
Year	Competition	Venue	Position	Event	Result	Notes
1986	European Championships	Stuttgart, West Germany	18th	10 km	51:05	
1987	World Race Walking Cup	New York City, United States	29th	10 km	48:05	
1988	European Indoor Championships	Budapest, Hungary	5th	3000 m	13:04.45	
1989	World Race Walking Cup	L'Hospitalet, Spain	10th	10 km	45:20	
1990	European Championships	Split, Yugoslavia	9th	10 km	45:54	
1991	World Indoor Championships	Seville, Spain	—	3000 m	DQ	Heats
1991	World Race Walking Cup	San Jose, United States	25th	10 km	47:25	
1991	World Championships	Tokyo, Japan	13th	10 km	45:00	
1992	Olympic Games	Barcelona, Spain	12th	10 km	45:50	
1993	World Race Walking Cup	Monterrey, Mexico	16th	10 km	47:37	
1993	World Championships	Stuttgart, Germany	10th	10 km	44:17	
1994	European Championships	Helsinki, Finland	14th	10 km	45:31	
1995	World Race Walking Cup	Beijing, China	29th	10 km	45:56	
1995	World Championships	Gothenburg, Sweden	7th	10 km	42:34	
1996	Olympic Games	Atlanta, United States	9th	10 km	43:32	
1997	World Race Walking Cup	Poděbrady, Czech Republic	20th	10 km	43:41	
1997	World Championships	Athens, Greece	11th	10 km	45:36.57	
1998	European Race Walking Cup	Dudince, Slovakia	2nd	10 km	43:08	
1998	European Championships	Budapest, Hungary	4th	10 km	42:59	
1999	World Race Walking Cup	Mézidon-Canon, France	26th	10 km	1:33:28	
1999	World Championships	Seville, Spain	22nd	20 km	1:36:48	
2000	European Race Walking Cup	Eisenhüttenstadt, Germany	12th	20 km	1:31:21	
2000	Olympic Games	Sydney, Australia	18th	20 km	1:34.45	
2001	European Race Walking Cup	Dudince, Slovakia	31st	20 km	1:37:48	
2002	World Race Walking Cup	Turin, Italy	57th	20 km	1:43:32	

== National titles ==
- Hungarian Athletics Championships
  - 10 km walk: 1989, 1990, 1993, 1994, 1995, 2001
  - 20 km walk: 1996, 1999, 2001
- Hungarian Indoor Athletics Championships
  - 3000 m walk: 1990, 1993, 1994

== See also ==
- List of Hungarian Athletics Championships champions (women)
- Hungary at the 1992 Summer Olympics
- Hungary at the 1996 Summer Olympics
- Hungary at the 2000 Summer Olympics
