= 1990 World Junior Championships in Athletics – Women's 5000 metres walk =

The women's 5000 metres walk event at the 1990 World Junior Championships in Athletics was held in Plovdiv, Bulgaria, at Deveti Septemvri Stadium on 12 August.

== Medalists ==
Gold	Susana Feitór; Portugal
Silver	Tatyana Shchastnaya; Soviet Union
Bronze	Simone Thust; East Germany

== Results ==
=== Final ===
12 August

Rank	Name	Nationality	Time	Notes
1st place, gold medalist(s)	Susana Feitór	Portugal	21:44.30	
2nd place, silver medalist(s)	Tatyana Shchastnaya	Soviet Union	22:28.74	
3rd place, bronze medalist(s)	Simone Thust	East Germany	22:44.65	
4	Miriam Ramón	Ecuador	22:51.10	
5	Vicky Lupton	United Kingdom	22:51.86	
6	Kamila Holpuchová	Czechoslovakia	23:04.67	
7	Mioara Papuc	Romania	23:13.92	
8	Jantien Saltet	Australia	23:15.25	
9	Andrea Szabó	Hungary	23:18.93	
10	Nevena Dimitrova	Bulgaria	23:20.00	
11	Luisa Nivicela	Ecuador	23:33.79	
12	Ginka Radeva	Bulgaria	23:35.18	
13	Jane Saville	Australia	23:42.46	
14	Beáta Szászi	Hungary	23:46.43	
15	María Vasco	Spain	23:47.98	
16	Muriel Eberhard	West Germany	23:49.17	
17	Raisa Shivireva	Soviet Union	23:49.19	
18	Rossella Giordano	Italy	23:53.80	
19	Nadia Santacaterina	Italy	24:00.18	
20	Anja Kondrup	Denmark	24:12.48	
21	Corinne Whissel	Canada	24:17.31	
22	Karianne Larsen	Norway	24:48.04	
23	Mira Saastamoinen	Finland	25:09.33	
24	Gretchen Eastler	United States	25:10.90	
25	Jennifer Zalewski	United States	25:19.34	
26	Ivana Henn	Brazil	25:39.18	
27	Angelamar da Silva	Brazil	25:53.07	
	Jin Bingyie	China	DQ	
	Maria del Rosario Sánchez	Mexico	DQ	

== Participation ==
According to an unofficial count, 29 athletes from 21 countries participated in the event.

- Australia (2)
- Brazil (2)
- Bulgaria (2)
- Canada (1)
- China (1)
- Czechoslovakia (1)
- Denmark (1)
- East Germany (1)
- Ecuador (2)
- Finland (1)
- Hungary (2)
- Italy (2)
- Mexico (1)
- Norway (1)
- Portugal (1)
- Romania (1)
- Soviet Union (2)
- Spain (1)
- United Kingdom (1)
- United States (2)
- West Germany (1)
