= Irina Stankina =

Russian racewalker

Irina Vasilyevna Stankina (Russian: Ирина Васильевна Станкина; born 25 March 1977 in Saransk, Mordovian ASSR, Soviet Union) is a Russian race walker. The 1994 World Junior champion and record holder, in 1995 she won the 10 kilometres race walk at the World Championships as the youngest-ever (18 years and 135 days). She later walked the 20 kilometres race walk in 1:25:29 hours, the fourth-best time ever.

== International competitions ==
Year	Competition	Venue	Position	Event	Notes
Representing Russia
1994	World Junior Championships	Lisbon, Portugal	1st	5000 m	21:05.41
1995	World Championships	Gothenburg, Sweden	1st	10 km	42:13
1996	Olympic Games	Atlanta, United States	—	10 km	DQ
1996	World Junior Championships	Sydney, Australia	1st	5000 m	21:31.85
1997	IAAF World Race Walking Cup	Poděbrady, Czech Republic	1st	10 km	41:52
1997	World Championships	Athens, Greece	—	10 km	DQ
1999	World Championships	Seville, Spain	17th	20 km	1:35:42
2000	Olympic Games	Sydney, Australia	—	20 km	DNF
