= Athletics at the 1991 Pan American Games – Women's 10,000 metres walk =

Women's 10 kilometres walk at the Pan American Games

The women's 10,000 metres walk event at the 1991 Pan American Games was held in Havana, Cuba on 8 August.

== Results ==
Rank	Name	Nationality	Time	Notes
1st place, gold medalist(s)	Graciela Mendoza	Mexico	46:41.56	
2nd place, silver medalist(s)	Debbi Lawrence	United States	46:51.53	
3rd place, bronze medalist(s)	Maricela Chávez	Mexico	47:44.73	
4	Lynn Weik	United States	47:54.05	
5	Yoslaine Puñales	Cuba	51:07.43	
6	Lora Rigutto	Canada	53:32.07	
7	María Calderín	Cuba	54:34.90	
8	Magdalena Guzmán	El Salvador	54:57.09	
9	Doris Vallecillo	Honduras	57:37.07	
