= 2005 World Championships in Athletics – Women's 20 kilometres walk =

The Women's 20 km race walk event at the 2005 World Championships in Athletics was held on August 7 in the streets of Helsinki with the start at 11:35h local time, and the goal line situated in the Helsinki Olympic Stadium. Russia's Olimpiada Ivanova won the race in a world record time of 1:25:41 hours.

== Medalists ==
Gold	Olimpiada Ivanova; Russia (RUS)
Silver	Ryta Turava; Belarus (BLR)
Bronze	Susana Feitor; Portugal (POR)

== Abbreviations ==
- All times shown are in hours:minutes:seconds

DNS	did not start
DSQ	disqualified
NM	no mark
WR	world record
WL	world leading
AR	area record
NR	national record
PB	personal best
SB	season best

== Intermediates ==
Rank	Number	Athlete	Time
5 kilometres
1	635	Olimpiada Ivanova (RUS)	21:43
2	112	Jiang Jing (CHN)	21:43
3	116	Song Hongjuan (CHN)	22:02
4	60	Ryta Turava (BLR)	22:02
5	391	Elisa Rigaudo (ITA)	22:14
10 kilometres
1	635	Olimpiada Ivanova (RUS)	42:54
2	60	Ryta Turava (BLR)	43:59
3	116	Song Hongjuan (CHN)	43:59
4	177	Cristina López (ESA)	44:04
5	337	Athanasia Tsoumeleka (GRE)	44:05
15 kilometres
1	635	Olimpiada Ivanova (RUS)	1:04:05
2	60	Ryta Turava (BLR)	1:05:26
3	391	Elisa Rigaudo (ITA)	1:05:57
4	337	Athanasia Tsoumeleka (GRE)	1:06:04
5	197	María Vasco (ESP)	1:06:10

== Finishing times ==
1. Olimpiada Ivanova, Russia 1:25:41 (WR)
2. Ryta Turava, Belarus 1:27:05 (NR)
3. Susana Feitor, Portugal 1:28:44 (SB)
4. María Vasco, Spain 1:28:51 (SB)
5. Barbora Dibelková, Czech Republic 1:29:05 (NR)
6. Athina Papayianni, Greece 1:29:21 (SB)
7. Elisa Rigaudo, Italy 1:29:52
8. Claudia Stef, Romania 1:30:07
9. Song Hongjuan, China 1:30:32
10. Yuliya Voyevodina, Russia 1:30:34
11. Melanie Seeger, Germany 1:31:00
12. Kristina Saltanovic, Lithuania 1:31:23 (SB)
13. Elena Ginko, Belarus 1:31:36
14. Ana Maria Groza, Romania 1:31:48 (SB)
15. Vera Santos, Portugal 1:32:17
16. Maria Teresa Gargallo, Spain 1:32:24
17. Svetlana Tolstaya, Kazakhstan 1:32:40
18. Tatyana Gudkova, Russia 1:33:05
19. Geovana Irusta, Bolivia 1:33:19
20. Jane Saville, Australia 1:33:44
21. Cheryl Webb, Australia 1:33:58
22. Jolanta Dukure, Latvia 1:34:24 (SB)
23. Sabine Zimmer, Germany 1:34:24
24. Mária Gáliková, Slovakia 1:34:38 (PB)
25. Gisella Orsini, Italy 1:35:05
26. Vira Zozulya, Ukraine 1:35:12
27. Inês Henriques, Portugal 1:35:44
28. María José Poves, Spain 1:36:12
29. Kim Mi-Jung, South Korea 1:37:01
30. Sonata Milušauskaitė, Lithuania 1:37:17
31. Mayumi Kawasaki, Japan 1:37:30
32. Monica Svensson, Sweden 1:38:11
33. Graciela Mendoza, Mexico 1:39:56
34. Mabel Oncebay, Peru 1:40:46
35. Outi Sillanpää, Finland 1:41:03

=== Athletes who did not finish ===
- Sachiko Konishi, Japan
- Teresa Vaill, United States
- Yelena Nikolayeva, Russia
- Miriam Ramón, Ecuador
- Nataliya Misyulya, Belarus
- Wang Liping, China

=== Athletes disqualified ===
- Olive Loughnane, Ireland
- Athanasia Tsoumeleka, Greece
- Cristina López, El Salvador
- Jiang Jing, China
- Evelyn Núñez, Guatemala
- Gulnara Mammadova, Azerbaijan

== See also ==
- 2005 Race Walking Year Ranking
