= Wang Yan (race walker) =

Chinese race walker (born 1971)

Wang Yan (Chinese: 王妍; pinyin: Wáng Yán; born 3 May 1971, in Liaoning) is a Chinese race walker, who won the bronze medal over 10 km at the 1996 Summer Olympics in Atlanta. She also won the 1993 IAAF World Race Walking Cup, as well as a silver medal at the 1999 World Championships and a bronze at the 2001 East Asian Games.

She was the world record holder for the 20 km walk from 2001 to 2005. She held the Asian record for the women's 20 km walk with her best of 1:26:22 hours from 2001 to 2012, until it was beaten by Liu Hong.

== Achievements ==
Year	Competition	Venue	Position	Event	Notes
Representing China
1986	World Junior Championships	Athens, Greece	1st	5000 m	22:03.65
1993	World Race Walking Cup	Monterrey, Mexico	1st	10 km	45:10
1993	World Championships	Stuttgart, Germany	—	10 km	DSQ
1995	World Race Walking Cup	Beijing, China	14th	10 km	44:25
1996	Olympic Games	Atlanta, United States	3rd	10 km	42:19
1997	World Championships	Athens, Greece	12th	10,000 m	46:21.69
1999	World Championships	Seville, Spain	2nd	20 km	1:30:52
2001	East Asian Games	Osaka, Japan	3rd	20 km	1:35:36

== See also ==
- China at the World Championships in Athletics

Records
Preceded by Liu Hongyu; Nadezhda Ryashkina	Women's 20 km Walk World Record Holder; November 19, 2001 – August 7, 2005	Succeeded by Olimpiada Ivanova
