= 1988 World Junior Championships in Athletics – Women's 5000 metres walk =

Athletics

The women's 5000 metres walk event at the 1988 World Junior Championships in Athletics was held in Sudbury, Ontario, Canada, at Laurentian University Stadium on 31 July.

== Medalists ==
Gold	Mari Cruz Díaz; Spain
Silver	Olga Sánchez; Spain
Bronze	Maria Grazia Orsani; Italy

== Results ==
=== Final ===
31 July

Rank	Name	Nationality	Time	Notes
1st place, gold medalist(s)	Mari Cruz Díaz	Spain	21:51.31	
2nd place, silver medalist(s)	Olga Sánchez	Spain	21:58.17	
3rd place, bronze medalist(s)	Maria Grazia Orsani	Italy	22:04.74	
4	Annarita Sidoti	Italy	22:36.47	
5	Wang Yili	China	22:38.33	
6	Nathalie Marchand	France	22:39.25	
7	Gabrielle Blythe	Australia	22:44.82	
8	Tatyana Titova	Soviet Union	23:00.82	
9	Mioara Papuc	Romania	23:39.85	
10	Corinne Whissel	Canada	24:32.25	
11	Julie Drake	United Kingdom	24:37.42	
12	Deirdre Collier	United States	24:40.14	
13	Agnetha Chelimo	Kenya	24:45.91	
14	Magdalena Pettersson	Sweden	24:51.54	
15	Aleyna Narbey	Australia	25:07.65	
16	Tina Poitras	Canada	25:09.73	
17	Liliana Bermeo	Colombia	25:11.55	
18	Marie Walsh	Ireland	26:11.14	
19	Josephine Quinlan	Ireland	26:29.59	
20	Sybil Perez	United States	26:34.44	
21	Ivana Henn	Brazil	26:49.30	
22	Teresa San Juan	Mexico	28:01.52	
23	Indra Mala	Nepal	29:25.04	
	Alina Ivanova	Soviet Union	DQ	
	Anita Blomberg	Norway	DNF	
	Karla Ramona Castro	Mexico	DNF	

== Participation ==
According to an unofficial count, 26 athletes from 18 countries participated in the event.

- Australia (2)
- Brazil (1)
- Canada (2)
- China (1)
- Colombia (1)
- France (1)
- Ireland (2)
- Italy (2)
- Kenya (1)
- Mexico (2)
- Nepal (1)
- Norway (1)
- Romania (1)
- Soviet Union (2)
- Spain (2)
- Sweden (1)
- United Kingdom (1)
- United States (2)
