= Norica Câmpean =

Romanian racewalker

Norica Câmpean (born 22 March 1972, in Teiuș) is a retired female race walker from Romania.

== Achievements ==
Year	Competition	Venue	Position	Event	Notes
Representing Romania
1994	European Indoor Championships	Paris, France	9th	3000 m	12:24.04
1994	European Championships	Helsinki, Finland	—	10 km	DQ
1995	World Championships	Gothenburg, Sweden	20th	10 km	44:46
1996	Olympic Games	Atlanta, United States	29th	10 km	46:19
1997	World Race Walking Cup	Poděbrady, Czech Republic	17th	10 km	43:21
1998	European Championships	Budapest, Hungary	—	10 km	DQ
1999	World Race Walking Cup	Mézidon-Canon, France	3rd	20 km	1:27:48
1999	World Championships	Seville, Spain	—	20 km	DNF
2000	European Race Walking Cup	Eisenhüttenstadt, Germany	6th	20 km	1:28:59
2000	Olympic Games	Sydney, Australia	6th	20 km	1:31:50
2001	European Race Walking Cup	Dudince, Slovakia	6th	20 km	1:29:25
2001	World Championships	Edmonton, Canada	6th	20 km	1:30:39
2002	World Race Walking Cup	Turin, Italy	10th	20 km	1:31:41
2002	European Championships	Munich, Germany	—	20 km	DSQ
2003	World Championships	Paris, France	—	20 km	DSQ
2004	Olympic Games	Athens, Greece	27th	20 km	1:34:30
2004	World Race Walking Cup	Naumburg, Germany	13th	20 km	1:29:51
