= Sonata Milušauskaitė =

Lithuanian racewalker (born 1973)

Sonata Milušauskaitė (born 31 August 1973 in Prienai, Kaunas) is a Lithuanian race walker.

== Achievements ==
Year	Competition	Venue	Position	Event	Notes
Representing Lithuania
1992	World Junior Championships	Seoul, South Korea	15th	5000 m	23:24.56
1994	European Championships	Helsinki, Finland	17th	10 km	46:17
1995	World Championships	Gothenburg, Sweden	32nd	10 km	45:55
1996	Olympic Games	Atlanta, United States	37th	10 km	48:05
1997	World Race Walking Cup	Poděbrady, Czech Republic	64th	10 km	47:28
1998	European Championships	Budapest, Hungary	21st	10 km	46:32
1999	World Race Walking Cup	Mézidon-Canon, France	47th	20 km	1:37:01
1999	World Championships	Seville, Spain	30th	20 km	1:39:56
2000	European Race Walking Cup	Eisenhüttenstadt, Germany	33rd	20 km	1:35:13
2000	Olympic Games	Sydney, Australia	31st	20 km	1:37:14
2001	European Race Walking Cup	Dudince, Slovakia	29th	20 km	1:37:31
2001	World Championships	Edmonton, Canada	18th	20 km	1:37:33
2002	European Championships	Munich, Germany	—	20 km	DNF
2002	World Race Walking Cup	Turin, Italy	35th	20 km	1:36:48
2003	World Championships	Paris, France	16th	20 km	1:32:58
2004	World Race Walking Cup	Naumburg, Germany	30th	20 km	1:32:11
2004	Olympic Games	Athens, Greece	23rd	20 km	1:33:36
2005	World Championships	Helsinki, Finland	30th	20 km	1:37:17
2006	World Race Walking Cup	A Coruña, Spain	25th	20 km	1:33:04
2006	European Championships	Gothenburg, Sweden	21st	20 km	1:36:20
2007	World Championships	Osaka, Japan	22nd	20 km	1:37:28
2008	IAAF World Race Walking Cup	Cheboksary, Russia	12th	20 km	1:30:35
2008	Olympic Games	Beijing, China	15th	20 km	1:30:26
2009	European Race Walking Cup	Metz, France	—	20 km	DNF
2011	European Race Walking Cup	Olhão, Portugal	—	20 km	DNF
2012	World Race Walking Cup	Saransk, Russia	—	20 km	DNF
