= Pier Carola Pagani =

Italian racewalker (born 1963)

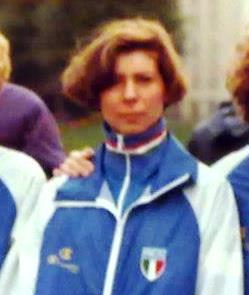

Personal information
- National team: Italy: 13 caps (1983-1992)
- Born: 10 November 1963 (age 62) Calepio, Italy

Sport
- Sport: Athletics
- Event: Racewalking
- Club: Fiamma Inglesina (1983-1989); Libertas Sesto (1990-1992)
- Retired: 1992

Achievements and titles
- Personal best: 10 km: 46:55 (1990)
Medal record
World Race Walking Cup
Silver medal – second place	1991 San Josè	Team 10 km

Pier Carola Pagani (born 10 November 1963) is a former Italian racewalker who was in the top eight at the 1992 European Athletics Indoor Championships in the 3000 m walk.

== Achievements ==
Senior

Year	Competition	Venue	Rank	Event	Performance	Notes
1983	World Race Walking Cup	(Norway) Bergen	41st	10 km walk	53:05	
1983	World Race Walking Cup	(Norway) Bergen	6th	Team	48 pts	
1985	World Race Walking Cup	(Isle of Man) St John	46th	10 km walk	52:20	
1985	World Race Walking Cup	(Isle of Man) St John	5th	Team	88 pts	
1990	European Indoor Championships	(United Kingdom) Glasgow	9th	3000 m walk	12:48.10	
1990	European Championships	(Socialist Federal Republic of Yugoslavia) Split	12th	10 km walk	46:55	
1991	World Race Walking Cup	(United States) San Josè	17th	10 km walk	46:33	
1991	World Race Walking Cup	(United States) San Josè	2nd	Team	180 pts	
1992	European Indoor Championships	(Italy) Genoa	8th	3000 m walk	12:14.74	

== National titles ==
Pagani won a national championship at individual senior level.

- Italian Athletics Indoor Championships
  - 3000 m walk: 1988

== See also ==
- Italian team at the running events
- Italy at the IAAF World Race Walking Cup
