= Yelena Gruzinova =

Russian racewalker

Yelena Gruzinova-Bronyukova (Russian: Елена Грузинова-Бронюкова; born December 24, 1967) is a retired female race walker from Russia. She competed for her native country at the 1996 Summer Olympics.

== Achievements ==
| Year | Competition | Venue | Position | Notes |
Representing Russia
| 1993 | World Race Walking Cup | Monterrey, Mexico | 11th | 10 km |
| 1995 | World Race Walking Cup | Beijing, PR China | 17th | 10 km |
| 1996 | Olympic Games | Atlanta, United States | 10th | 10 km |
