= María Vasco =

Spanish race walker

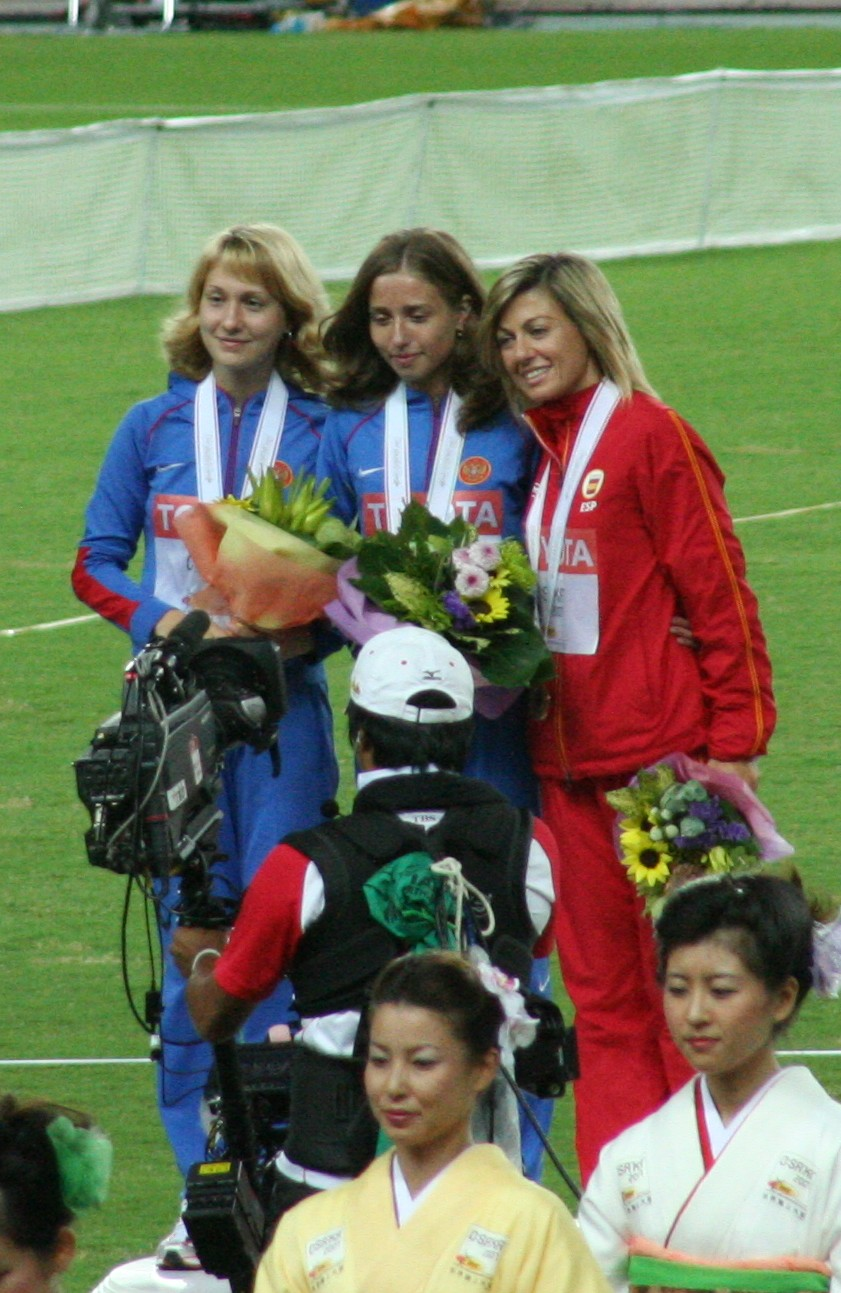
- María Vasco (on the right) in Osaka, 2007

Personal information
- Born: December 26, 1975 (age 50) Viladecans, Catalonia, Spain
- Height: 1.57 m (5 ft 2 in)
- Weight: 47 kg (104 lb)

Sport
- Country: Spain
- Sport: Athletics
- Event: 20km race walk
Medal record
Olympic Games
Bronze medal – third place	2000 Sydney	20 km walk
World Championships
Bronze medal – third place	2007 Osaka	20 km walk
World Race Walking Cup
Gold medal – first place	2010 Chihuahua	20 km walk
Bronze medal – third place	2004 Naumburg	20 km walk

María del Monte Vasco Pes Gallardo (born December 26, 1975) is a Spanish race walker. She won the bronze medal in the 20 km at the 2000 Summer Olympics in Sydney and the 2007 World Championships in Osaka. Vasco was also a gold and bronze medalist at the IAAF Race Walking Championships. She was born in Viladecans near Barcelona, Spain.

== International competitions ==
Year	Competition	Venue	Position	Event	Notes
Representing Spain
1990	World Junior Championships	Plovdiv, Bulgaria	15th	5000 m	23:47.98
1992	World Junior Championships	Seoul, South Korea	6th	5000 m	22:34.26
1993	European Junior Championships	San Sebastián, Spain	4th	5000 m	22:40.83
1994	World Junior Championships	Lisbon, Portugal	4th	5000 m	21:41.47
1995	World Race Walking Cup	Beijing, China	26th	10 km	45:40
1995	World Championships	Gothenburg, Sweden	26th	10 km	45:05
1996	European Race Walking Cup	A Coruña, Spain	13th	10 km	45:39
1996	Olympic Games	Atlanta, United States	28th	10 km	46:09
1997	World Race Walking Cup	Poděbrady, Czech Republic	22nd	10 km	43:54
1997	European U23 Championships	Turku, Finland	2nd	10 km	44:01
1998	European Race Walking Cup	Dudince, Slovakia	7th	10 km	43:23
1998	European Race Walking Cup	Dudince, Slovakia	3rd	Team - 10 km	41 pts
1998	European Championships	Budapest, Hungary	5th	10 km	43:02
1999	World Race Walking Cup	Mézidon-Canon, France	23rd	20 km	1:32:38
1999	World Championships	Seville, Spain	10th	20 km	1:33:35
2000	European Race Walking Cup	Eisenhüttenstadt, Germany	—	20 km	DNF
2000	Olympic Games	Sydney, Australia	3rd	20 km	1:30:23
2001	European Race Walking Cup	Dudince, Slovakia	7th	20 km	1:30:11
2001	World Championships	Edmonton, Canada	5th	20 km	1:30:19
2002	World Race Walking Cup	Turin, Italy	8th	20 km	1:30:57
2002	European Championships	Munich, Germany	—	20 km	DNF
2003	European Race Walking Cup	Cheboksary, Russia	3rd	20 km	1:28:10
2003	European Race Walking Cup	Cheboksary, Russia	2nd	Team - 20 km	40 pts
2003	World Championships	Paris, France	—	20 km	DNF
2004	Olympic Games	Athens, Greece	7th	20 km	1:30:06
2004	World Race Walking Cup	Naumburg, Germany	3rd	20 km	1:27:36
2005	World Championships	Helsinki, Finland	4th	20 km	1:28:51
2005	Mediterranean Games	Almería, Spain	2nd	20 km	1:34:28
2006	European Championships	Gothenburg, Sweden	15th	20 km	1:32:50
2007	European Race Walking Cup	Royal Leamington Spa, United Kingdom	5th	20 km	1:29:17
2007	European Race Walking Cup	Royal Leamington Spa, United Kingdom	3rd	Team - 20 km	25 pts
2007	World Championships	Osaka, Japan	3rd	20 km	1:30:47
2008	World Race Walking Cup	Cheboksary, Russia	5th	20 km	1:28:39
2008	Olympic Games	Beijing, China	5th	20 km	1:27:25
2009	European Race Walking Cup	Metz, France	1st	20 km	1:32:53
2009	European Race Walking Cup	Metz, France	2nd	Team - 20 km	18 pts
2009	World Championships	Berlin, Germany	—	20 km	DSQ
2010	World Race Walking Cup	Chihuahua, Mexico	1st	20 km	1:31:55
2010	European Championships	Barcelona, Spain	—	20 km	DNF
2011	European Race Walking Cup	Olhão, Portugal	4th	20 km	1:31:41
2011	European Race Walking Cup	Olhão, Portugal	2nd	Team - 20 km	22 pts
2011	World Championships	Daegu, South Korea	13th	20 km	1:32:42
2012	World Race Walking Cup	Saransk, Russia	—	20 km	DNF
2012	Olympic Games	London, United Kingdom	7th	20 km	1:28:14
