= Gu Yan =

Chinese racewalker

Gu Yan (born 17 March 1974) is a retired Chinese race walker.

== Achievements ==
Year	Tournament	Venue	Result	Extra
1994	Asian Games	Hiroshima, Japan	2nd	10 km
1995	World Race Walking Cup	Beijing, PR China	4th	10 km
1995	World Championships	Gothenburg, Sweden	11th	10 km
1996	Olympic Games	Atlanta, United States	4th	10 km
1997	World Race Walking Cup	Poděbrady, Czech Republic	3rd	10 km
1997	World Championships	Athens, Greece	7th	10 km
