= Tina Poitras =

Canadian racewalker

Personal information
- Born: October 5, 1970 (age 55) Thompson, Manitoba, Canada

Sport
- Sport: Race walking

Tina Poitras (born October 5, 1970) is a former race walker from Canada, who competed for her native country at two Summer Olympics: Barcelona 1992 and Atlanta 1996. She set her personal best time of 44:32 in the women's 10 km event in 1997.

Poitras was given the Terry Fox Humanitarian award in 1992 in recognition of her 'social spirit, humanitarian and community service, while maintaining excellence in academic, amateur sport and physical well-being'.

== Achievements ==
| Year | Competition | Venue | Position | Event | Notes |
Representing Canada
| 1988 | World Junior Championships | Sudbury, Canada | 16th | 5000 m | 25:09.73 |
| 1991 | Universiade | Sheffield, United Kingdom | 7th | 10 km | 46:25 |
| 1991 | World Championships | Tokyo, Japan | 28th | 10 km | 47:22 |
| 1992 | Olympic Games | Barcelona, Spain | 21st | 10 km | 46:50 |
| 1993 | World Championships | Stuttgart, Germany | 34th | 10 km | 48:24 |
| 1994 | Jeux de la Francophonie | Bondoufle, France | 6th | 10,000 m | 49:05.81 |
| 1995 | World Championships | Gothenburg, Sweden | 21st | 10 km | 45:02 |
| 1996 | Olympic Games | Atlanta, United States | 25th | 10 km | 46:51 |
