= Natalya Misyulya =

Belarusian racewalker

Natalya Misyulya (Belarusian: Наталля Місюля, maiden name Dmitrachenka; born April 16, 1966) is a retired female race walker from Belarus. She competed in two consecutive Summer Olympics for her native country: 1996 and 2000.

She is married with race walker Yevgeniy Misyulya.

== International competitions ==
Year	Competition	Venue	Position	Event	Notes
Representing Belarus
1993	World Race Walking Cup	Monterrey, Mexico	20th	10 km	47:59
1993	World Championships	Stuttgart, Germany	17th	10 km	46:22
1994	European Championships	Helsinki, Finland	6th	10 km	43:39
1995	World Championships	Gothenburg, Sweden	18th	10 km	44:27
1996	Olympic Games	Atlanta, United States	17th	10 km	45:11
1998	European Championships	Budapest, Hungary	10th	10 km	43:55
1999	World Championships	Seville, Spain	14th	20 km	1:35:03
2000	Olympic Games	Sydney, Australia	9th	20 km	1:33:08
2001	European Race Walking Cup	Dudince, Slovakia	10th	20 km	1:31:21
2005	World Championships	Helsinki, Finland	—	20 km	DNF
