= Athletics at the 1996 Summer Olympics – Women's 10 kilometres walk =

Women's 10 kilometres walk at the Games of the XXVI Olympiad
- Venue: Centennial Olympic Stadium
- Date: July 29
- Competitors: 44 from 25 nations
- Winning time: 41:49 OR

Medalists
1st place, gold medalist(s)		Yelena Nikolayeva; Russia
2nd place, silver medalist(s)		Elisabetta Perrone; Italy
3rd place, bronze medalist(s)		Wang Yan; China

These are the official results of the Women's 10 km Walk at the 1996 Summer Olympics in Atlanta, Georgia. There were a total of 44 competitors, with one athlete who did not finish the race and five disqualifications.

== Medalists ==
Gold	Yelena Nikolayeva; Russia
Silver	Elisabetta Perrone; Italy
Bronze	Wang Yan; China

== Abbreviations ==
- All times shown are in hours:minutes:seconds

DNS	did not start
NM	no mark
OR	olympic record
WR	world record
AR	area record
NR	national record
PB	personal best
SB	season best

== Final ranking ==
Rank	Athlete	Time	Note
1st place, gold medalist(s)	Yelena Nikolayeva (RUS)	41:49	
2nd place, silver medalist(s)	Elisabetta Perrone (ITA)	42:12	
3rd place, bronze medalist(s)	Wang Yan (CHN)	42:19	
4	Gu Yan (CHN)	42:34	
5	Rossella Giordano (ITA)	42:43	
6	Olga Kardopoltseva (BLR)	43:02	
7	Katarzyna Radtke (POL)	43:05	
8	Valentina Tsybulskaya (BLR)	43:21	
9	Mária Urbanik (HUN)	43:32	
10	Yelena Gruzinova (RUS)	43:50	
11	Annarita Sidoti (ITA)	43:57	
12	Kerry Saxby-Junna (AUS)	43:59	
13	Susana Feitor (POR)	44:24	
14	Michelle Rohl (USA)	44:29	
15	Kathrin Born-Boyde (GER)	44:50	
16	Sari Essayah (FIN)	45:02	
17	Nataliya Misyulya (BLR)	45:11	
18	Graciela Mendoza (MEX)	45:13	
19	Anne Manning (AUS)	45:27	
20	Debbi Lawrence (USA)	45:32	
21	Svetlana Tolstaya (KAZ)	45:35	
21	Anita Liepina (LAT)	45:35	
23	Deirdre Gallagher (IRL)	45:47	
23	Annastasia Raj (MAS)	45:47	
23	Janice McCaffrey (CAN)	45:47	
26	Jane Saville (AUS)	45:56	
27	Anikó Szebenszky (HUN)	45:57	
28	María Vasco (ESP)	46:09	
29	Norica Câmpean (ROU)	46:19	
30	Tatyana Ragozina (UKR)	46:25	
31	Nathalie Fortain (FRA)	46:43	
32	Tina Poitras (CAN)	46:51	
33	Vicky Lupton (GBR)	47:05	
34	Geovana Irusta (BOL)	47:13	
35	Maya Sazonova (KAZ)	47:33	
36	Valérie Nadaud (FRA)	47:49	
37	Sonata Milušauskaitė (LTU)	48:05	
38	Kada Delić (BIH)	48:47	
DID NOT FINISH (DNF)
—	Encarna Granados (ESP)	DNF	
DISQUALIFIED (DSQ)
—	Gao Hongmiao (CHN)	DSQ	
—	Beate Gummelt (GER)	DSQ	
—	Victoria Herazo (USA)	DSQ	
—	Yuka Mitsumori (JPN)	DSQ	
—	Irina Stankina (RUS)	DSQ	

== See also ==
- 1996 Race Walking Year Ranking
