= Simone Thust =

German racewalker

Simone Thust (born 22 September 1971) is a retired female race walker from Germany. Her only medal came in the 1990 World Junior Championships in Athletics, in which she placed bronze in the 5000 Metres Race Walk representing East Germany.

== Achievements ==
Year	Competition	Venue	Position	Event	Notes
Representing East Germany
1990	World Junior Championships	Plovdiv, Bulgaria	3rd	5000 m	22:44.65
Representing Germany
1993	World Championships	Stuttgart, Germany	35th	10 km	48:38
1994	European Championships	Helsinki, Finland	19th	10 km	46:26
1995	World Championships	Gothenburg, Sweden	29th	10 km	45:24
