= Deirdre Gallagher =

Irish racewalker

Personal information
- Born: 13 July 1974 (age 52) Ballina, County Mayo, Ireland

Sport
- Sport: Race walking

Deirdre Gallagher (born 13 July 1974) is a retired female race walker from Ireland. She represented Ireland in the 1996 Summer Olympics held in Atlanta.

== Achievements ==
Year	Competition	Venue	Position	Event	Notes
Representing Ireland
1992	World Junior Championships	Seoul, South Korea	25th	5000m	24:59.45
1994	European Championships	Helsinki, Finland	25th	10 km	48:50
1995	World Championships	Gothenburg, Sweden	33rd	10 km	46:00
1996	Olympic Games	Atlanta, United States	23rd	10 km	45:47
