= Hanne Liland =

Norwegian racewalker

Hanne Liland (born August 7, 1969) is a retired female race walker from Norway.

== Achievements ==
Year	Competition	Venue	Position	Event	Notes
Representing Norway
1993	World Race Walking Cup	Monterrey, Mexico	58th	10 km	52:22
1994	European Championships	Helsinki, Finland	21st	10 km	46:51
1997	World Race Walking Cup	Poděbrady, Czech Republic	72nd	10 km	48:22
1998	European Championships	Budapest, Hungary	24th	10 km	48:57
2001	European Race Walking Cup	Dudince, Slovakia	—	20 km	DNF
