= Rossella Giordano =

Italian race walker (born 1972)

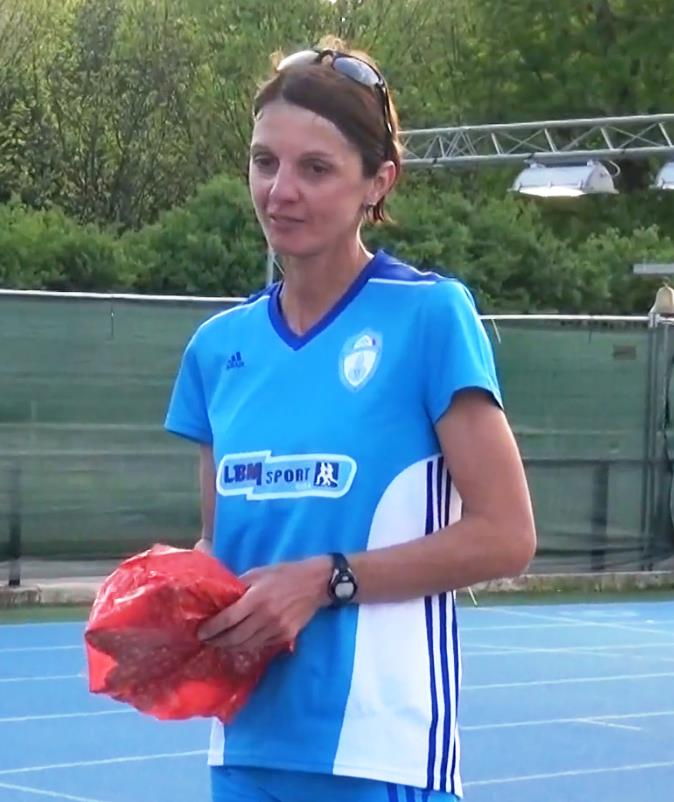
- Giordano in 2015 at 43.

Personal information
- Born: December 1, 1972 (age 53) Asti, Italy
- Height: 1.70 m (5 ft 7 in)
- Weight: 51 kg (112 lb)

Sport
- Country: Italy
- Sport: Athletics
- Event: Racewalking
- Club: G.S. Fiamme Azzurre
- Coached by: Sandro Damilano

Achievements and titles
- Personal bests: 10 km: 41:38 (1997); 10 km: 1:29:12 (1997)
Medal record
Event	1st	2nd	3rd
Summer Universiade	0	3	0
World Race Walking Cup	0	1	0
European Race Walking Cup	2	2	0

Rossella Giordano (born 1 December 1972) is an Italian race walker.

== Biography ==
Rossella Giordano won four silver medals, to senior level, at the International athletics competitions. She participated at two editions of the Summer Olympics (1996 and 2004), she has 25 caps in national team from 1996 to 2008.

== National record ==
- 20000 metres walk (track): 1:30:48 ( (Portugal) Almada, 4 August 2000)

== Achievements ==
Year	Competition	Venue	Position	Event	Notes
Representing Italy
1990	World Junior Championships	Plovdiv, Bulgaria	18th	5000m	23:53.80
1995	World Race Walking Cup	Beijing, PR China	7th	10 km	43:44
1995	World Student Games	Fukuoka, Japan	2nd	10 km	43:30
1995	World Championships	Gothenburg, Sweden	6th	10 km	42:26
1996	European Race Walking Cup	A Coruña, Spain	2nd	10 km	43:27
1996	Olympic Games	Atlanta, United States	5th	10 km	42:43
1997	World Race Walking Cup	Poděbrady, Czech Republic	5th	10 km	42:37
1997	World Student Games	Catania, Italy	2nd	10 km	44:31
1999	World Championships	Seville, Spain	27th	20 km	1:38:06
1999	World Student Games	Palma de Mallorca, Spain	2nd	10 km	44:39
2002	World Race Walking Cup	Turin, Italy	9th	20 km	1:31:10
2003	World Championships	Paris, France	6th	20 km	1:29:14
2004	Olympic Games	Athens, Greece	11th	20 km	1:30:39
2006	European Championships	Gothenburg, Sweden	18th	20 km	1:33:56

== National titles ==
She won three times the individual national championship.

- 3 wins in the 10 km walk (1996, 1998)
- 1 win in the 5000 m walk track (2006)

== See also ==
- Italy at the European Race Walking Cup - Multiple medalists
- Italian all-time lists - 20 km walk
