= Graciela Mendoza =

Mexican race walker (born 1963)

Graciela Mendozag
Personal information
- Full name: María Graciela Mendoza Barrios
- Born: 23 March 1963 (age 63) Ixtapan del Oro, México
- Height: 1.56 m (5 ft 1 in)
- Weight: 48 kg (106 lb)

Sport
- Country: Mexico
- Sport: Athletics
- Event: Race walking
Medal record
Representing Mexico
Pan American Games
Gold medal – first place	1991 Havana	10km walk
Gold medal – first place	1995 Mar del Plata	10km walk
Gold medal – first place	1999 Winnipeg	20km walk
Central American and Caribbean Games
Gold medal – first place	1990 Mexico City	10km walk
Gold medal – first place	1998 Maracaibo	10km walk
Silver medal – second place	1986 Santiago	10km walk
- Updated on 27 July 2013

María Graciela Mendoza Barrios (born 23 March 1963) is a Mexican retired race walker.

== Personal bests ==
- 10 km: 42:42 min – Naumburg, Germany, 5 April 1997
- 20 km: 1:30:03 hrs – Mézidon-Canon, France, 2 May 1999

== International competitions ==
Year	Competition	Venue	Position	Event	Notes
Representing Mexico
1986	Pan American Race Walking Cup	Saint-Leonard, Canada	1st	10 km	45:23
1986	Central American and Caribbean Games	Santiago de los Caballeros, Dominican Republic	2nd	10,000 m	51:56.62
1987	World Indoor Championships	Indianapolis, United States	16th	3000 m	14:01.21
1987	World Race Walking Cup	New York City, United States	6th	10 km	45:02
1987	Pan American Games	Indianapolis, United States	–	10,000 m	DQ
1987	World Championships	Rome, Italy	27th	10 km	49:46
1988	Ibero-American Championships	Mexico City, Mexico	2nd	10,000 m	51:09.8 A
1988	Pan American Race Walking Cup	Mar del Plata, Argentina	6th	10 km	48:32
1989	Central American and Caribbean Championships	San Juan, Puerto Rico	1st	10,000 m	48:19.28 CR
1990	Pan American Race Walking Cup	Xalapa, Mexico	1st	10 km	46:07
1990	Central American and Caribbean Games	Mexico City, Mexico	1st	10,000 m	49:09.45 A
1991	World Race Walking Cup	San Jose, United States	2nd	10 km	44:09
1991	Pan American Games	Havana, Cuba	1st	10,000 m	46:41.56
1991	World Championships	Tokyo, Japan	6th	10 km	44:03
1992	Olympic Games	Barcelona, Spain	—	10 km	DSQ
1994	Pan American Race Walking Cup	Atlanta, United States	1st	10 km	46:14
1995	Pan American Games	Mar del Plata, Argentina	1st	10,000 m	46:31.93
1995	World Championships	Gothenburg, Sweden	19th	10 km	44:44
1996	Pan American Race Walking Cup	Manaus, Brazil	1st	10 km	48:24
1996	Olympic Games	Atlanta, United States	18th	10 km	45:13
1997	Central American and Caribbean Championships	San Juan, Puerto Rico	1st	10,000 m	47:43.99
1998	Central American and Caribbean Games	Maracaibo, Venezuela	1st	10,000 m	46:30.16
1999	Pan American Games	Winnipeg, Canada	1st	20 km	1:34:19
1999	World Race Walking Cup	Mézidon-Canon, France	8th	20 km	1:30:03
1999	World Championships	Seville, Spain	—	20 km	DSQ
2000	Olympic Games	Sydney, Australia	—	20 km	DSQ
2005	Pan American Race Walking Cup	Lima, Peru	3rd	20 km	1:33:04
2005	World Championships	Helsinki, Finland	33rd	20 km	1:39:56
