= Tatyana Ragozina =

Ukrainian racewalker

Tatyana Ragozina (Ukrainian: Тетяна Рагозіна; born September 3, 1964) is a retired female race walker from Ukraine, who competed for her native country at the 1996 Summer Olympics in Atlanta, United States. She set her personal best (1:32:17) in the women's 20 km event on June 17, 2000 in Eisenhüttenstadt.

== Achievements ==
Year	Competition	Venue	Position	Event	Notes
Representing Ukraine
1993	World Championships	Stuttgart, Germany	13th	10 km	45:24
1994	European Championships	Helsinki, Finland	10th	10 km	44:15
1995	World Race Walking Cup	Beijing, PR China	18th	10 km	44:35
1995	World Championships	Gothenburg, Sweden	—	10 km	DNF
1996	Olympic Games	Atlanta, United States	30th	10 km	46:25
1998	European Championships	Budapest, Hungary	13th	10 km	44:17
2000	European Race Walking Cup	Eisenhüttenstadt, Germany	17th	20 km	1:32:17
