= Yuka Mitsumori =

Japanese racewalker

Personal information
- Nationality: Japanese
- Born: 8 January 1972 (age 54)

Sport
- Sport: Athletics
- Event: Racewalking
Medal record
Women's athletics
Representing Japan
Asian Championships
Bronze medal – third place	1993 Manila	10 km walk
Bronze medal – third place	1998 Fukuoka	10 km walk

Yuka Mitsumori (三森 由佳, Mitsumori Yuka; born 8 January 1972) is a Japanese racewalker. She competed in the women's 10 kilometres walk at the 1996 Summer Olympics.
