= Kamila Holpuchová =

Czech race walker

Kamila Holpuchová (born 27 September 1973) is a Czech retired race walker. She set her personal best (44.20 minutes) in the women's 10 km road race on 23 May 1993.

== Achievements ==
Year	Competition	Venue	Position	Event	Notes
Representing Czechoslovakia
1990	World Junior Championships	Plovdiv, Bulgaria	6th	5000 m	23:04.67
1991	World Championships	Tokyo, Japan	32nd	10 km	48:06
1992	World Junior Championships	Seoul, South Korea	5th	5000m	22:33.92
Representing Czech Republic
1993	World Championships	Stuttgart, Germany	25th	10 km	47:24
1995	World Championships	Gothenburg, Sweden	38th	10 km	47:12
1997	World Race Walking Cup	Poděbrady, Czech Republic	105th	10 km	52:58
