= Susana Feitor =

Portuguese racewalker

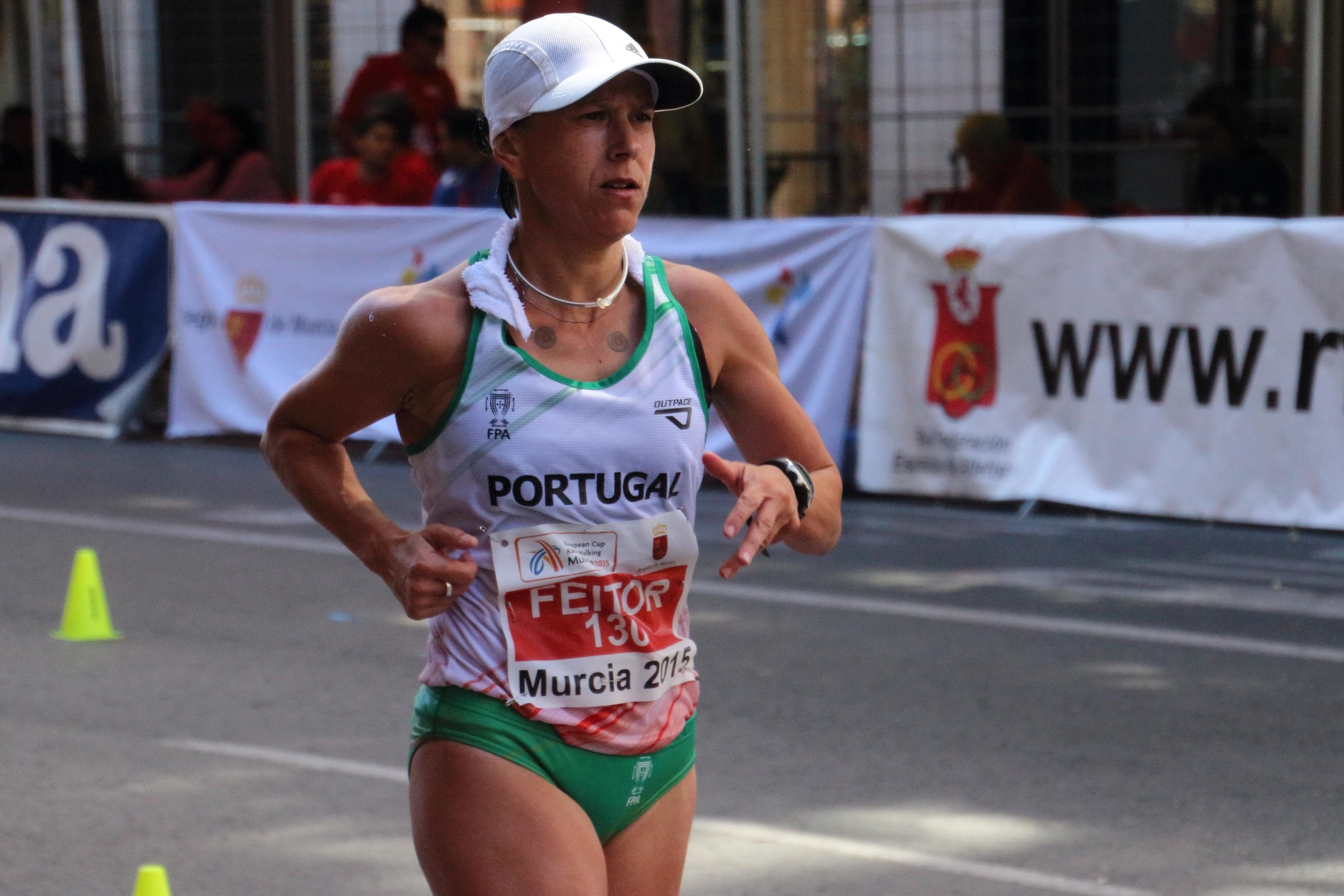
- Susana Feitor at the 2015 European Race Walking Cup

Personal information
- Born: 28 January 1975 (age 51) Alcobertas, Portugal

Sport
- Sport: Race walking
Medal record
Representing Portugal
World Championships
| Bronze medal – third place | 2005 Helsinki | 20 km walk |
European Championships
| Bronze medal – third place | 1998 Budapest | 10 km walk |
Summer Universiade
| Silver medal – second place | 2001 Beijing | 10 km walk |

Susana Paula de Jesus Feitor, DamIH (born 28 January 1975) is a Portuguese racewalker. She was born in Alcobertas.

== Achievements ==
| Year | Competition | Venue | Position | Event | Notes |
Representing Portugal
| 1990 | World Junior Championships | Plovdiv, Bulgaria | 1st | 5000 m | 21:44.30 |
| 1991 | World Championships | Tokyo, Japan | 17th | 10 km | 45:37 |
| 1992 | Olympic Games | Barcelona, Spain | — | 10 km | DSQ |
| 1992 | World Junior Championships | Seoul, South Korea | — | 5000 m | DQ |
| 1993 | World Race Walking Cup | Monterrey, Mexico | 8th | 10 km | 46:28 |
| 1993 | World Championships | Stuttgart, Germany | 11th | 10 km | 45:06 |
| 1994 | World Junior Championships | Lisbon, Portugal | 2nd | 5000 m | 21:12.87 |
| 1994 | European Championships | Helsinki, Finland | 8th | 10 km | 43:47 |
| 1995 | World Championships | Gothenburg, Sweden | 17th | 10 km | 44:25 |
| 1995 | World Race Walking Cup | Beijing, China | 16th | 10 km | 44:25 |
| 1996 | European Race Walking Cup | A Coruña, Spain | 3rd | 10 km | 43:41 |
| 1996 | Olympic Games | Atlanta, United States | 13th | 10 km | 44:24 |
| 1997 | World Race Walking Cup | Poděbrady, Czech Republic | — | 10 km | DNF |
| 1997 | European U23 Championships | Turku, Finland | 3rd | 10 km | 44:26 |
| 1997 | World Championships | Athens, Greece | 22nd (h) | 10,000 m | 45:00.77 |
| 1998 | European Championships | Budapest, Hungary | 3rd | 10 km | 42:55 |
| 1999 | World Championships | Seville, Spain | 4th | 20 km | 1:31:23 |
| 1999 | World Race Walking Cup | Mézidon-Canon, France | 9th | 20 km | 1:30:13 |
| 2000 | European Race Walking Cup | Eisenhüttenstadt, Germany | — | 20 km | DNF |
| 2000 | Olympic Games | Sydney, Australia | 14th | 20 km | 1:33:53 |
| 2001 | European Race Walking Cup | Dudince, Slovakia | — | 20 km | DSQ |
| 2001 | World Championships | Edmonton, Canada | — | 20 km | DSQ |
| 2002 | European Championships | Munich, Germany | — | 20 km | DNF |
| 2002 | World Race Walking Cup | Turin, Italy | 14th | 20 km | 1:32:57 |
| 2003 | World Championships | Paris, France | 9th | 20 km | 1:30:15 |
| 2004 | Olympic Games | Athens, Greece | 20th | 20 km | 1:32:47 |
| 2005 | European Race Walking Cup | Miskolc, Hungary | 2nd | 20 km | 1:29:01 |
| 2005 | European Race Walking Cup | Miskolc, Hungary | 1st | Team - 20 km | 25 pts |
| 2005 | World Championships | Helsinki, Finland | 3rd | 20 km | 1:28:44 |
| 2006 | World Race Walking Cup | A Coruña, Spain | — | 20 km | DNF |
| 2006 | European Championships | Gothenburg, Sweden | 14th | 20 km | 1:32:19 |
| 2007 | World Championships | Osaka, Japan | 5th | 20 km | 1:32:01 |
| 2008 | World Race Walking Cup | Cheboksary, Russia | 10th | 20 km | 1:29:38 |
| 2008 | Olympic Games | Beijing, China | — | 20 km | DNF |
| 2009 | European Race Walking Cup | Metz, France | — | 20 km | DNF |
| 2009 | World Championships | Berlin, Germany | 10th | 20 km | 1:32:42 |
| 2010 | World Race Walking Cup | Chihuahua, Mexico | 16th | 20 km | 1:37:58 |
| 2011 | European Race Walking Cup | Olhão, Portugal | 9th | 20 km | 1:32:43 |
| 2011 | World Championships | Daegu, South Korea | 6th | 20 km | 1:31:26 |
| 2012 | World Race Walking Cup | Saransk, Russia | 65th | 20 km | 1:42:48 |
| 2013 | European Race Walking Cup | Dudince, Slovakia | 31st | 20 km | 1:39:22 |
| 2013 | European Race Walking Cup | Dudince, Slovakia | 2nd | Team - 20 km | 23 pts |
| 2014 | World Race Walking Cup | Taicang, China | 17th | 20 km | 1:28:51 |
| 2015 | European Race Walking Cup | Murcia, Spain | 19th | 20 km | 1:31:58 |
| 2015 | European Race Walking Cup | Murcia, Spain | 3rd | Team - 20 km | 38 pts |
