= Valentina Tsybulskaya =

Belarusian race walker

Personal information
- Born: March 17, 1968 (age 58) Rostov-on-Don, Soviet Union

Sport
- Sport: Race walking
Medal record
Representing Belarus
World Championships
Silver medal – second place	2001 Edmonton	20 km walk
Bronze medal – third place	1997 Athens	20 km walk
Bronze medal – third place	2003 Paris	20 km walk

Valentina "Valya" Ivanovna Tsybulskaya (Belarusian: Валянціна Іванаўна Цыбульская; born March 17, 1968) is a Belarusian race walker. She has won World Championships silver and bronze medals. She competed at the 1996, 2000 and 2004 Summer Olympics.

== Achievements ==
Year	Competition	Venue	Position	Event	Notes
Representing Belarus
1994	European Championships	Helsinki, Finland	12th	10 km	45:06
1995	World Race Walking Cup	Beijing, China	13th	10 km	44:23
1995	World Championships	Gothenburg, Sweden	12th	10 km	43:34
1996	Olympic Games	Atlanta, United States	8th	10 km	43:21
1997	World Championships	Athens, Greece	3rd	10,000 m	43:49.24
1998	European Championships	Budapest, Hungary	15th	10 km	45:22
2000	European Race Walking Cup	Eisenhüttenstadt, Germany	8th	20 km	1:30:19
2000	Olympic Games	Sydney, Australia	28th	20 km	1:36:44
2001	European Race Walking Cup	Dudince, Slovakia	8th	20 km	1:30:37
2001	World Championships	Edmonton, Canada	2nd	20 km	1:28:49
2003	World Championships	Paris, France	3rd	20 km	1:28:10
2004	Olympic Games	Athens, Greece	15th	20 km	1:31:49
