= Anikó Szebenszky =

Hungarian racewalker

Personal information
- Born: August 12, 1965 (age 61) Tiszafüred, Jász-Nagykun-Szolnok, Hungary

Sport
- Sport: Race walking

Anikó Szebenszky (born August 12, 1965) is a retired female race walker from Hungary. She competed in two consecutive Summer Olympics for her native country, starting in 1996.

== Achievements ==
Year	Competition	Venue	Position	Event	Notes
Representing Hungary
1987	World Race Walking Cup	New York City, United States	47th	10 km	49:45
1989	World Race Walking Cup	L'Hospitalet, Spain	30th	10 km	47:14
1990	European Championships	Split, FR Yugoslavia	16th	10 km	47:46
1991	World Race Walking Cup	San Jose, United States	53rd	10 km	50:17
1993	World Race Walking Cup	Monterrey, Mexico	40th	10 km	50:01
1995	World Race Walking Cup	Beijing, PR China	28th	10 km	45:56
1995	World Championships	Gothenburg, Sweden	23rd	10 km	45:03
1996	Summer Olympics	Atlanta, United States	27th	10 km	45:57
1997	World Race Walking Cup	Poděbrady, Czech Republic	19th	10 km	43:41
1997	World Championships	Athens, Greece	6th	10 km	44:14.94
1998	European Championships	Budapest, Hungary	—	10 km	DSQ
1999	World Race Walking Cup	Mézidon-Canon, France	33rd	20 km	1:35:26
1999	World Championships	Seville, Spain	28th	20 km	1:38:27
2000	Olympic Games	Sydney, Australia	29th	20 km	1:36.46

== Awards ==
- Hungarian athlete of the Year (1): 1997
