= Victoria Herazo =

American racewalker

Personal information
- Full name: Victoria S. Herazo
- Nickname: Tori
- Nationality: American
- Born: June 2, 1959 (age 66)

Sport
- Sport: Athletics
- Event: Racewalking

Victoria S. "Tori" Herazo (born June 2, 1959) is an American racewalker. She competed in the women's 10 kilometres walk at the 1992 Summer Olympics and the 1996 Summer Olympics.
