= Elisabetta Perrone =

Italian racewalker (born 1968)

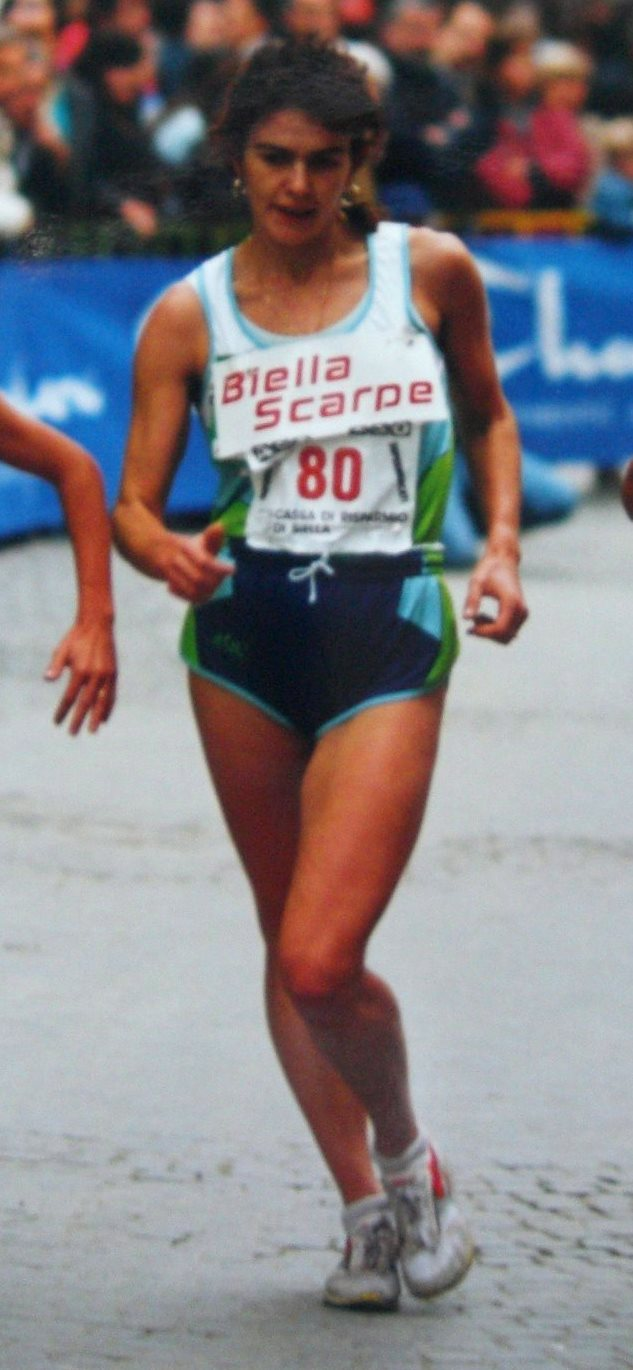
- Perrone in a race walk competition in Biella in 1993.

Personal information
- Born: 9 July 1968 (age 58) Camburzano, Biella, Italy
- Height: 1.68 m (5 ft 6 in)
- Weight: 56 kg (123 lb)

Sport
- Country: Italy
- Sport: Athletics
- Event: Racewalking
- Club: G.S. Forestale

Achievements and titles
- Personal bests: 10 km: 41:56 (1993); 20 km: 1:27:09 (2001)
Medal record
Individual
Event	1st	2nd	3rd
Olympic Games	0	1	0
World Championships	0	1	1
Mediterranean Games	1	1	0
European Race Walking Cup	0	2	1
Total	1	5	2
Team
Event	1st	2nd	3rd
World Race Walking Cup	1	4	0
European Race Walking Cup	3	2	0
Total	4	6	0
Olympic Games
Silver medal – second place	1996 Atlanta	10 km walk
World Championships
Silver medal – second place	1995 Gothenburg	10 km walk
Bronze medal – third place	2001 Edmonton	20 km walk

Elisabetta Perrone (born 9 July 1968) is a former race walker from Italy who won eighteen medals, eight of these at senior level, at the International athletics competitions.

== Biography ==
Elisabetta Perrone won six medals at the individual level, at the International athletics competitions. She participated in four editions of the Summer Olympics (1992, 1996, 2000, 2004). She has 39 caps in sixteen years in the national team from 1981 to 2004.

== National records ==
- 20 km race walk: 1:27:09 ( (Slovakia) Dudince, 19 May 2001). Record held until 17 May 2015 (broken by Eleonora Giorgi with 1:26:17)
- 5000 m race walk: 20:12.24 ( (Italy) Rieti, 2 August 2003). Record held until 18 May 2014 (broken by Eleonora Giorgi with 20.01.80)

== Achievements ==
Year	Competition	Venue	Position	Event	Notes
Representing Italy
1992	Olympic Games	Barcelona, Spain	19th	10 km	46:43
1993	World Race Walking Cup	Monterrey, Mexico	10th	10 km	46:49
1993	World Championships	Stuttgart, Germany	4th	10 km	43:26
1994	European Championships	Helsinki, Finland	7th	10 km	43:47
1995	World Race Walking Cup	Beijing, China	6th	10 km	43:13
1995	World Championships	Gothenburg, Sweden	2nd	10 km	42:16
1996	Olympic Games	Atlanta, United States	2nd	10 km	42:12
1997	World Championships	Athens, Greece	10th	10,000 m	45:16.64
1997	Mediterranean Games	Bari, Italy	1st	10 km	44:40
1998	European Championships	Budapest, Hungary	11th	10 km	44:04
1999	World Championships	Seville, Spain	21st	20 km	1:36:24
2000	European Race Walking Cup	Eisenhüttenstadt, Germany	2nd	20 km	1:27:42
2000	Olympic Games	Sydney, Australia	—	20 km	DSQ
2001	European Race Walking Cup	Dudince, Slovakia	3rd	20 km	1:27:09
2001	Mediterranean Games	Tunis, Tunisia	2nd	20 km	1:36:47
2001	World Championships	Edmonton, Canada	3rd	20 km	1:28:56
2002	European Championships	Munich, Germany	6th	20 km	1:30:25
2003	European Race Walking Cup	Cheboksary, Russia	2nd	20 km	1:27:58
2003	World Championships	Paris, France	—	20 km	DNF
2004	Olympic Games	Athens, Greece	18th	20 km	1:32:21

== National titles ==
Perrone won 9 national championships at the individual senior level.

- Italian Athletics Championships
  - 5000 m walk (track): 1994, 1996, 1997, 2003 (4)
  - 10,000 m walk (track): 1994, 1995 (2)
  - 20 km: 2001 (1)
- Italian Athletics Indoor Championships
  - 3000 m walk: 1998, 2003 (2)

== See also ==
- Italy at the European Race Walking Cup - Multiple medalists
- Italian all-time lists - 20 km walk
