= Ildikó Ilyés =

Hungarian racewalker

Ildikó Illyés (born August 28, 1966 in Békés) is a retired female race walker from Hungary, who competed for her native country at the 1992 Summer Olympics in Barcelona, Spain. She set her personal best (43.57) in the women's 10 km event in 1996.

== Achievements ==
Year	Competition	Venue	Position	Event	Notes
Representing Hungary
1986	European Championships	Stuttgart, West Germany	—	10 km	DSQ
1987	World Race Walking Cup	New York City, United States	38th	10 km	48:51
1989	World Race Walking Cup	L'Hospitalet, Spain	24th	10 km	46:46
1990	European Championships	Split, Yugoslavia	13th	10 km	47:17
1991	World Race Walking Cup	San Jose, United States	23rd	10 km	46:50
1992	Olympic Games	Barcelona, Spain	13th	10 km	45:54
1993	World Race Walking Cup	Monterrey, Mexico	29th	10 km	48:55
1993	World Championships	Stuttgart, Germany	20th	10 km	46:45
1995	World Race Walking Cup	Beijing, China	36th	10 km	46:00
1997	World Race Walking Cup	Poděbrady, Czech Republic	47th	10 km	45:56
1998	European Championships	Budapest, Hungary	14th	10 km	44:52
1999	World Race Walking Cup	Mézidon-Canon, France	60th	20 km	1:39:39
2001	European Race Walking Cup	Dudince, Slovakia	44th	20 km	1:41:10
2002	World Race Walking Cup	Turin, Italy	72nd	20 km	1:49:09
2004	World Race Walking Cup	Naumburg, Germany	60th	20 km	1:39:14
2006	World Race Walking Cup	A Coruña, Spain	—	20 km	DSQ
