= Olga Kardopoltseva =

Belarusian racewalker (born 1966)

Medal record

Women's athletics

Representing Soviet Union

European Championships
Silver medal – second place	1990 Split	10 km walk

Olga Kardopoltseva (Belarusian: Вольга Кардапольцава; born 11 September 1966 in Almaty, Kazakhstan) is a Belarusian race walker.

== International competitions ==
Year	Competition	Venue	Position	Event	Notes
Representing Soviet Union
1990	European Championships	Split, Yugoslavia	2nd	10 km	44:06
1991	World Indoor Championships	Seville, Spain	4th	3000 m	
1991	World Race Walking Cup	San Jose, United States	4th	10 km	44:36
Representing Belarus
1995	World Race Walking Cup	Beijing, China	20th	10 km	45:09
1995	World Championships	Gothenburg, Sweden	14th	10 km	44:07
1996	Olympic Games	Atlanta, United States	6th	10 km	43:02
1997	World Championships	Athens, Greece	2nd	10 km	43:30.20 = PB
1998	European Championships	Budapest, Hungary	8th	10 km	43:38
1999	World Championships	Seville, Spain	—	20 km	DSQ
2000	European Race Walking Cup	Eisenhüttenstadt, Germany	27th	20 km	1:34:53
2003	World Championships	Paris, France	—	20 km	DSQ
