= Nora Leksir =

French athlete (born 1974)

Personal information
- Nationality: French
- Born: 13 May 1974 (age 52) Montbéliard
- Years active: 1990-2000
- Height: 1.58 m (5 ft 2 in)

Sport
- Event: race walking

Nora Leksir (married name is Génébrier) (born 13 May 1974 at Montbéliard) is a French athlete, who specializes in race walking.

== Biography ==
She won six French Walking Championships, three at 10 km and three at 20 km. She also won three Indoor French walking titles at 3,000 m.

She is the current record holder of France's 20 km walk doing 1:31.15, on 17 June 2000 at Eisenhüttenstadt.

She placed 22nd at the 2000 Sydney Olympics.

=== Prize list ===
- French Championships in Athletics :
  - winner of the 10 km walk in 1994, 1998 and 1999
  - winner of the 20 km walk in 1998, 1999 and 2000
- French Indoor Athletics Championships:
  - winner of 3000 m walking 1998, 1999 and 2001

=== Records ===
Personal Bests
| Event | Performance | Location | Date |
|---|---|---|---|
| 20 km walk | 1:31.15 | Eisenhüttenstadt | 17 June 2000 |
