= Annarita Sidoti =

Italian race walker

Personal information
- Nationality: Italian
- Born: 25 July 1969^{[nb]} Gioiosa Marea, Sicily, Italy
- Died: 21 May 2015 (aged 45) Gioiosa Marea, Sicily Italy
- Height: 1.50 m (4 ft 11 in)
- Weight: 42 kg (93 lb)

Sport
- Country: Italy
- Sport: Athletics
- Event: Race walk

Achievements and titles
- Personal bests: 10 km: 41:46 (1994); 20 km: 1:28:38 (2000)
Medal record
Women's athletics
Representing Italy
Event	1st	2nd	3rd
World Championships	1	0	0
European Championships	2	1	0
European Indoor Championships	1	0	1
World Race Walking Cup	1	3	1
European Race Walking Cup	3	2	0
Summer Universiade	1	0	2
Mediterranean Games	0	1	0
Total	9	7	4
World Championships
Gold medal – first place	1997 Athens	10 km walk
European Championships
Gold medal – first place	1990 Split	10 km walk
Gold medal – first place	1998 Budapest	10 km walk
Silver medal – second place	1994 Helsinki	10 km walk
European Indoor Championships
Gold medal – first place	1994 Paris	3000 m walk
Bronze medal – third place	1990 Glasgow	3000 m walk
Summer Universiade
Gold medal – first place	1995 Fukuoka	10 km walk
Bronze medal – third place	1991 Sheffield	10 km walk
Bronze medal – third place	1997 Catania	10 km walk
Mediterranean Games
Silver medal – second place	1997 Bari	10 km walk

Annarita Sidoti (25 July 1969^{[nb]} – 21 May 2015) was an Italian race walker.

== Biography ==
Annarita Sidoti was born in Gioiosa Marea. She won eleven medals at senior level in international competition. She participated at three editions of the Summer Olympics (1992, 1996, 2000), and earned 47 caps in fifteen years in the national team from 1987 to 2002.

She appeared in the film Le complici (1998) by director Emanuela Piovano, in which she played a prostitute.

== Death ==
She died on 21 May 2015 in Gioiosa Marea, Italy, of metastatic breast cancer, which had spread to her liver and brain. She was 45 years old.^{[nb]}

== International competitions ==
Year	Competition	Venue	Position	Event	Notes
Representing Italy
1988	World Junior Championships	Sudbury, Canada	4th	5000m	22:36.47
1989	World Race Walking Cup	L'Hospitalet, Spain	8th	10 km	44:59
1990	European Indoor Championships	Glasgow, United Kingdom	3rd	3000 m	12:27.94
1990	European Championships	Split, Yugoslavia	1st	10 km	44:00
1991	Summer Universiade	Buffalo, United States	3rd	10 km	45:10
1991	World Race Walking Cup	San Jose, United States	9th	10 km	45:28
1991	World Championships	Tokyo, Japan	9th	10 km	44:18
1992	Olympic Games	Barcelona, Spain	7th	10 km	45:23
1993	World Race Walking Cup	Monterrey, Mexico	7th	10 km	46:14
1993	World Championships	Stuttgart, Germany	9th	10 km	44:13
1994	European Indoor Championships	Paris, France	1st	3000 m	11:54.32
1994	European Championships	Helsinki, Finland	2nd	10 km	42:43
1995	World Race Walking Cup	Beijing, China	8th	10 km	43:55
1995	Summer Universiade	Fukuoka, Japan	1st	10 km	43:22
1995	World Championships	Gothenburg, Sweden	13th	10 km	44:06
1996	European Race Walking Cup	A Coruña, Spain	1st	10 km	43:26
1996	Olympic Games	Atlanta, United States	11th	10 km	43:57
1997	Mediterranean Games	Bari, Italy	2nd	10 km	45:35
1997	World Championships	Athens, Greece	1st	10,000m	42:55.49
1997	Summer Universiade	Catania, Italy	3rd	10 km	44:38
1998	European Championships	Budapest, Hungary	1st	10 km	42:49
1999	World Championships	Seville, Spain	—	20 km	DNF
2000	European Race Walking Cup	Eisenhüttenstadt, Germany	5th	20 km	1:28:38
2000	Olympic Games	Sydney, Australia	—	20 km	DNF
2001	European Race Walking Cup	Dudince, Slovakia	11th	20 km	1:31:43
2001	World Championships	Edmonton, Canada	8th	20 km	1:31:40
2002	European Championships	Munich, Germany	8th	20 km	1:31:19

== National titles ==
She won ten times at the Italian Athletics Championships.

- 1 win in the 5 km walk (1995)
- 1 win in the 10 km walk (1991)
- 4 wins in the 20 km walk (1992, 1995, 2000, 2002)
- 4 wins in the 3000 metres walk indoor (1991, 1994, 2001, 2002)

== See also ==
- Italy at the European Race Walking Cup - Multiple medalists
- Italian all-time lists – 20 km walk
- FIDAL Hall of Fame

== Notes ==
^{nb} Sources give her age at death as 44, but this is contradicted by widespread record of her year of birth as 1969 throughout the entirely of her career (by international and national athletics federations and Olympic scholars) and before publication of her death.

Awards
Preceded by Angela Bandini	Italian Sportswoman of the Year; 1990	Succeeded by Giovanna Trillini
