= Katarzyna Radtke =

Polish race walker

Katarzyna Radtke, née Schewe (born 31 August 1969) is a retired Polish race walker born in Bydgoszcz.

== Achievements ==
Year	Competition	Venue	Position	Event	Notes
Representing Poland
1991	World Championships	Tokyo, Japan	12th	10 km	44:42
1992	Olympic Games	Barcelona, Spain	11th	10 km	45:45
1993	World Championships	Stuttgart, Germany	6th	10 km	43:33
1994	European Championships	Helsinki, Finland	—	10 km	DQ
1995	World Race Walking Cup	Beijing, China	10th	10 km	44:07
1995	World Championships	Gothenburg, Sweden	—	10 km	DQ
1996	Olympic Games	Atlanta, United States	7th	10 km	43:05
1998	European Championships	Budapest, Hungary	6th	10 km	43:09
1999	World Championships	Seville, Spain	5th	20 km	1:31:34
1999	World Race Walking Cup	Mézidon-Canon, France	14th	20 km	1:31:26
2000	Olympic Games	Sydney, Australia	—	20 km	DNF

== See also ==
- Polish records in athletics
