= Beate Gummelt =

German racewalker (born 1968)

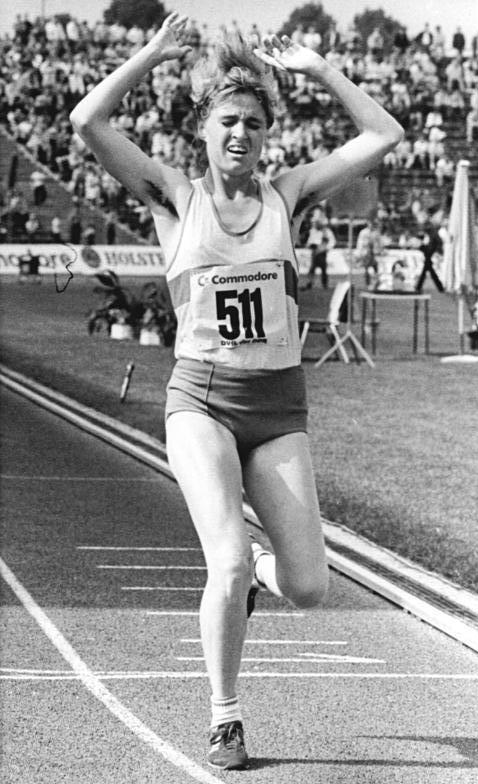
- Gummelt in 1988

Personal information
- Born: 4 February 1968 (age 58) Leipzig, East Germany

Sport
- Sport: Race walking
Medal record
Representing East Germany
World Indoor Championships
Gold medal – first place	1991 Seville	3000 m walk
Silver medal – second place	1989 Budapest	3000 m walk
World Race Walking Team Cup
Gold medal – first place	1989 L'Hospitalet	10 km team
European Championships
Gold medal – first place	1989 The Hague	3000 m walk
Gold medal – first place	1990 Glasgow	3000 m walk
Representing Germany
European Indoor Championships
Silver medal – second place	1994 Paris	3000 m walk
Bronze medal – third place	1992 Genoa	3000 m walk

Helga-Beate Gummelt (née Anders; born 4 February 1968) is a retired German racewalker. She competed in the 1980s until 2000 in the walk. Before 1991, she competed for East Germany.

Gummelt's biggest success was in 1991, when she became the indoor world champion in the 3,000 metre walk. In 1989 and 1990, she was the European indoor champion in the same event. In 1990 and 1991, she set four world records. Gummelt took part in the Summer Olympics 1992, 1996 and 2000.

== International results in detail ==
- 1987, 1987 world championship, 10 km street-walk: 16th place ( 47:00 Min.)
- 1989
  World indoor championship, 3000 m: 2nd place ( 12:07.73 Min.)
  European indoor championship: 3000 m: 1st place (12:21.91)
- 1990
  European indoor championship: 3000 m: 1st place (11:59.56)
  European championship: 6th place (45:18)
- 1991
  World indoor championship 3000 m: 1st place (11:50.90 Min.)
  World championship, 10 km street walk: 10th place (44:35 Min.)
- 1992
  Summer Olympics: 16th place (46:31 Min.)
  European indoor championship, 3000 m: 3rd place (11:55.41 Min.)
- 1993
  World championship, 10 km street walk: 5th place (43:28 Min.)
  World indoor championship 3000 m: 4th place (11:57.14 Min.)
- 1994
  European indoor championship, 3000 m: 2nd place (11:56.01 Min.)
  European championship, 10 km street walk: 9th place (44:09 Min.)
- 1995 World championship, 10 km street walk: 10th place (43:15 Min.)
- 1996 Summer Olympics: 10 km street walk: disqualified
- 1997 World championship 10,000 m track walk: quit
- 2000 Summer Olympics, 20 km street walk: 19th place (1:34:59)

== German titles (20 total wins) ==
- 1987—1989: East German champion, 10,000 Meter street walk
- 1990: East German champion in the 5000 meter track walk
- 1991—1997 (from 1994 under the name Beate Gummelt): German champion in the 5000 meter track walk and in the 10 km street walk
- 1999: German champion in the 20 km street walk
- 2000: German champion in the 5000 m track walk

== World records ==
- 3000 m track walk (indoor world records):
  11:59.36 Min., 4 March 1990 in Glasgow
  11:56.0 Min., 17 February 1991 in Dortmund
  11:50.90 Min., 9 March 1991 in Sevilla
- 5000 m track walk (unofficial free-air world record):
  20:07.52 Min., 23 June 1990 in Rostock

Gummelt belonged to the TSC Berlin when she represented East Germany and later the LAC Halensee Berlin. While she was competing, she was 1.69 meters tall and weighed 52 kilograms.
