= Italy at the World Athletics Indoor Championships =

- WA code: ITA
- National federation: FIDAL
- Website: www.fidal.it
- Medals Ranked 12th: Gold 12 Silver 11 Bronze 15 Total 38

World Athletics Indoor Championships appearances (overview)
- 1985; 1987; 1989; 1991; 1993; 1995; 1997; 1999; 2001; 2003; 2004; 2006; 2008; 2010; 2012; 2014; 2016; 2018; 2022; 2024

Italy has participated in all the World Athletics Indoor Championships since the beginning in 1985 IAAF World Indoor Games. Italy won a total of 24 medals (6 gold, 6 silver and 12 bronze). Italy is 21st on the all time medal table.

== Medal count ==
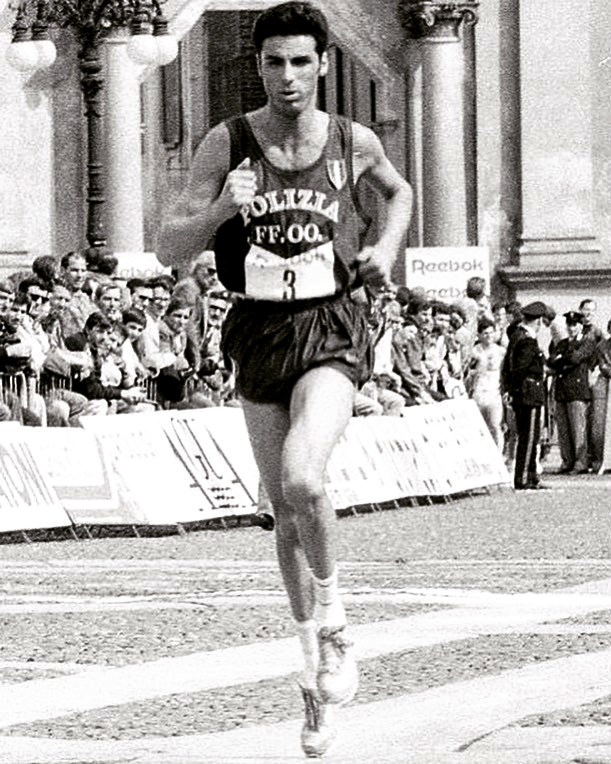
Gennaro Di Napoli, the only Italian athlete to win two gold medals at the World Indoor Athletics Championships.

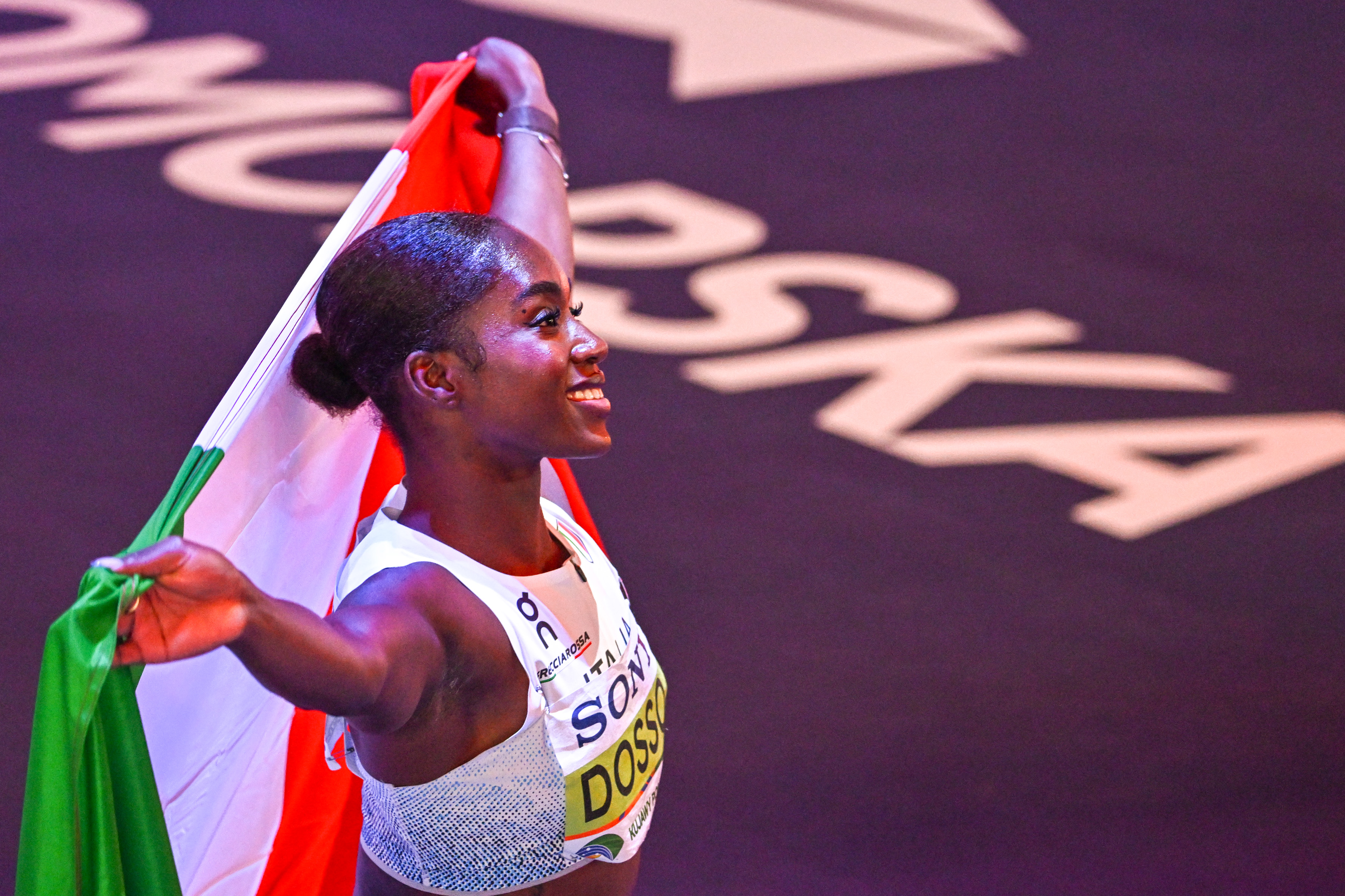
Zaynab Dosso, three medals in a row at the World Indoor: 2024 bronze, 2025 silver, 2026 gold.

Italy won 38 medals (12 gold) and ranked 12th in the all-time medal table of the championships. In six editions the azzurri team has not won any medals.

Best result
No medals

Edition	1st place, gold medalist(s)	2nd place, silver medalist(s)	3rd place, bronze medalist(s)	Rank
(France) Paris 1985	1	2	1	9
(United States) Indianapolis 1987	0	1	2	11
(Hungary) Budapest 1989	0	0	3	21
(Spain) Seville 1991	0	1	3	15
(Canada) Toronto 1993	1	0	1	10
(Spain) Barcelona 1995	1	1	0	6
(France) Paris 1997	1	0	0	11
(Japan) Maebashi 1999	0	0	0	-
(Portugal) Lisbon 2001	1	0	0	12
(United Kingdom) Birmingham 2003	0	0	0	-
(Hungary) Budapest 2004	0	0	0	-
(Russia) Moscow 2006	0	0	1	28
(Spain) Valencia 2008	0	0	0	-
(Qatar) Doha 2010	0	0	0	-
(Turkey) Istanbul 2012	0	1	0	17
(Poland) Sopot 2014	0	0	0	-
(United States) Portland 2016	1	0	0	10
(United Kingdom) Birmingham 2018	0	0	1	24
(Serbia) Belgrade 2022	1	0	1	13
(United Kingdom) Glasgow 2024	0	2	2	16
(China) Nanjing 2025	2	1	0	5
(Poland) Torun 2026	3	2	0	3
	12	11	15	12

== Medalists ==
Women medalists
No medals

Edition	Event	Gold	Silver	Bronze
(France) 1985 Paris	3000 metres walk	Giuliana Salce		
(France) 1985 Paris	5000 metres walks		Maurizio Damilano	
(France) 1985 Paris	3000 metres		Agnese Possamai	
(France) 1985 Paris	Long jump			Giovanni Evangelisti
(United States) 1987 Indianapolis	3000 metres walk		Giuliana Salce	
(United States) 1987 Indianapolis	60 metres			Pierfrancesco Pavoni
(United States) 1987 Indianapolis	Long jump			Giovanni Evangelisti
(Hungary) 1989 Budapest	60 metres			Pierfrancesco Pavoni
(Hungary) 1989 Budapest	800 metres			Tonino Viali
(Hungary) 1989 Budapest	3000 metres walk			Ileana Salvador
(Spain) 1991 Sevilla	5000 metres walk		Giovanni De Benedictis	
(Spain) 1991 Sevilla	4×400 metres relay			Marco Vaccari, Vito Petrella, Alessandro Aimar, Andrea Nuti
(Spain) 1991 Sevilla	Long jump			Giovanni Evangelisti
(Spain) 1991 Sevilla	3000 metres walk			Ileana Salvador
(Canada) 1993 Toronto	3000 metres	Gennaro Di Napoli		
(Canada) 1993 Toronto	3000 metres walk			Ileana Salvador
(Spain) 1995 Barcelona	3000 metres	Gennaro Di Napoli		
(Spain) 1995 Barcelona	4×400 metres relay		Fabio Grossi; Andrea Nuti; Roberto Mazzoleni; Ashraf Saber	
(France) 1997 Paris	Long jump	Fiona May		
(Japan) 1999 Maebashi				
(Portugal) 2001 Lisbon	Triple jump	Paolo Camossi		
(United Kingdom) 2003 Birmingham				
(Hungary) 2004 Budapest				
(Russia) 2006 Moscow	Long jump			Andrew Howe
(Spain) 2008 Valencia				
(Qatar) 2010 Doha				
(Turkey) 2012 Istanbul	High jump		Antonietta Di Martino	
(Poland) 2014 Sopot				
(United States) 2016 Portland	High jump	Gianmarco Tamberi		
(United Kingdom) 2018 Birmingham	High jump			Alessia Trost
(Serbia) 2022 Belgrade	60 m	Marcell Jacobs		
(Serbia) 2022 Belgrade	High jump			Gianmarco Tamberi
(United Kingdom) 2024 Glasgow	60 m hs		Lorenzo Simonelli	
(United Kingdom) 2024 Glasgow	Long jump		Mattia Furlan	
(United Kingdom) 2024 Glasgow	Shot put			Leonardo Fabbri
(United Kingdom) 2024 Glasgow	60 m			Zaynab Dosso
(China) 2025 Nanjing	Long jump	Mattia Furlan		
(China) 2025 Nanjing	Triple jump	Andy Diaz		
(China) 2025 Nanjing	60 m		Zaynab Dosso	
(Poland) 2026 Torun	Triple jump	Andy Diaz		
(Poland) 2026 Torun	60 m	Zaynab Dosso		
(Poland) 2026 Torun	3000 m	Nadia Battocletti		
(Poland) 2026 Torun	Long jump		Mattia Furlani	
(Poland) 2026 Torun	Long jump		Larissa Iapichino	
		12	11	15

== 1985 ==
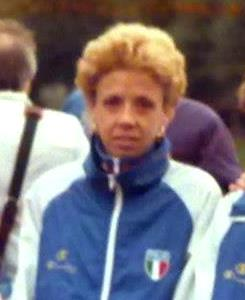
The racewalker Giuliana Salce, gold medal in 1985.

Italy participated with 19 competitors, 16 men (but one Roberto Ribaud in 400 m did not stsrt), and 3 women.

Top eight

=== Men ===
Athlete	60 m	200 m	400 m	800 m	1500 m	3000 m	60 m hs	5000 m walk	High jump	Pole vault	Long jump	Triple jump	Shot put
Antonio Ullo	8												
Pierfrancesco Pavoni	14												
Stefano Tilli		7											
Tonino Viali				6									
Riccardo Materazzi					5								
Alberto Corvo					6								
Stefano Mei						9							
Gianni Tozzi							9						
Luigi Bertocchi							11						
Maurizio Damilano								2					
Luca Toso									10				
Paolo Borghi									13				
Giovanni Evangelisti											3		
Mario Lega											10		
Marco Montelatici													6

=== Women ===
Athlete	60 m	200 m	400 m	800 m	1500 m	3000 m	60 m hs	3000 m walk	High jump	Long jump	Shot put
Antonella Ratti			6								
Agnese Possamai						2					
Giuliana Salce								1			

== 1987 ==
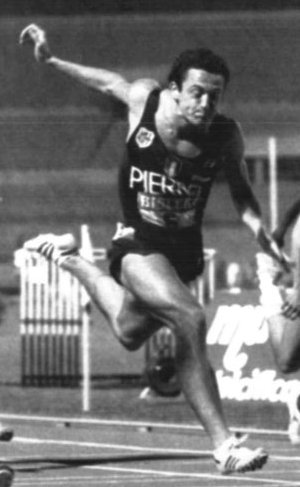
Pierfrancesco Pavoni, bronze medal in 60 m at the 1987 edition.

Italy participated with 14 competitors, 9 men and 5 women.

Top eight

=== Men ===
Athlete	60 m	200 m	400 m	800 m	1500 m	3000 m	60 m hs	5000 m walk	High jump	Pole vault	Long jump	Triple jump	Shot put
Pierfrancesco Pavoni	3												
Antonio Ullo	4												
Mauro Zuliani			13										
Alessandro Lambruschini					8	DNF							
Luigi Bertocchi							15						
Walter Arena								7					
Carlo Mattioli								13					
Gianni Stecchi										10			
Giovanni Evangelisti											3		

=== Women ===
Athlete	60 m	200 m	400 m	800 m	1500 m	3000 m	60 m hs	3000 m walk	High jump	Long jump	Shot put
Rossella Tarolo	21										
Daniela Ferrian		9									
Patrizia Lombardo							11				
Antonella Capriotti										8	
Giuliana Salce								2			

== 1989 ==
Italy participated with 11 competitors, 8 men and 3 women.

Top eight

=== Men ===
Athlete	60 m	200 m	400 m	800 m	1500 m	3000 m	60 m hs	5000 m walk	High jump	Pole vault	Long jump	Triple jump	Shot put
Pierfrancesco Pavoni	3												
Antonio Ullo	4												
Sandro Floris		4											
Paolo Catalano		10											
Tonino Viali				3									
Stefano Mei						8							
Giovanni De Benedictis								4					
Alessandro Andrei													7

=== Women ===
Athlete	60 m	200 m	400 m	800 m	1500 m	3000 m	60 m hs	3000 m walk	High jump	Long jump	Shot put
Ileana Salvador								3			
Antonella Capriotti										5	
Agnese Maffeis											12

== 1991 ==
Italy participated with 17 competitors, 13 men and 4 women.

Top eight

=== Men ===
Athlete	60 m	200 m	400 m	800 m	1500 m	3000 m	60 m hs	4×400 m relay	5000 m walk	High jump	Pole vault	Long jump	Triple jump	Shot put
Antonio Ullo	18													
Sandro Floris		7												
Paolo Catalano		9												
Davide Tirelli					16									
Laurent Ottoz							18							
Relay team Marco Vaccari; Vito Petrella; Alessandro Aimar; Andrea Nuti								3						
Giovanni De Benedictis									2					
Giovanni Evangelisti													3	
Dario Badinelli													7	
Alessandro Andrei														14

=== Women ===
Athlete	60 m	200 m	400 m	800 m	1500 m	3000 m	60 m hs	4×400 m relay	3000 m walk	High jump	Long jump	Shot put
Ileana Salvador									3			
Annarita Sidoti									DSQ			
Antonella Bevilacqua										17		
Valentina Uccheddu											7	

== 1993 ==
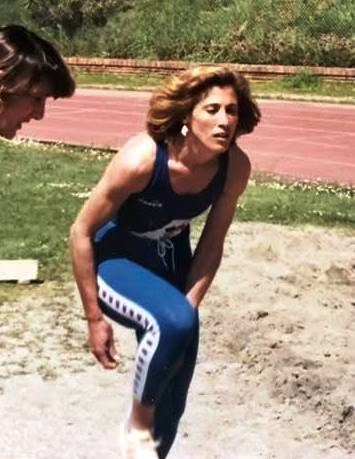
Antonella Capriotti, fourth place with the national record in the new introduction speciality (first time at this 1993 edition) women's triple jump.

Italy participated with 19 competitors, 14 men and 5 women.

Top eight

=== Men ===
Athlete	60 m	200 m	400 m	800 m	1500 m	3000 m	60 m hs	4×400 m relay	5000 m walk	High jump	Pole vault	Long jump	Triple jump	Shot put	Heptathlon
Stefano Tilli	16														
Marco Menchini		13													
Marco Vaccari			17												
Giuseppe D'Urso			10												
Amos Rota					16										
Gennaro Di Napoli						1									
Relay team Andrea Montanari; Vito Petrella; Fabio Grossi; Alessandro Aimar								6							
Roberto Ferrari										15					
Andrea Pegoraro											7				
Paolo Dal Soglio														5	
Luciano Zerbini														6	

=== Women ===
Athlete	60 m	200 m	400 m	800 m	1500 m	3000 m	60 m hs	4×400 m relay	3000 m walk	High jump	Long jump	Triple jump	Shot put	Pentathlon
Elisa Rea					11									
Ileana Salvador									3					
Annarita Sidoti									6					
Antonella Bevilacqua										18				
Antonella Capriotti											10	4		

== 1995 ==
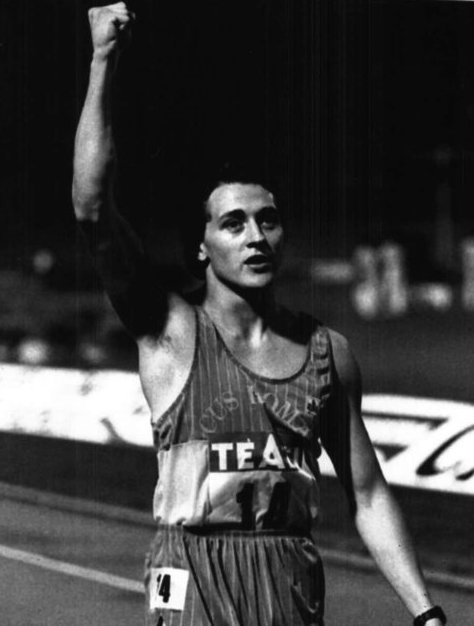
Stefano Tilli, semifinalist in 200 m at the 1995 edition.

Italy participated with 17 competitors, 13 men and 4 women.

Top eight

=== Men ===
Athlete	60 m	200 m	400 m	800 m	1500 m	3000 m	60 m hs	4×400 m relay	High jump	Pole vault	Long jump	Triple jump	Shot put	Heptathlon
Stefano Tilli	9													
Angelo Cipolloni		22												
Ashraf Saber			7											
Andrea Nuti			25											
Marco Chiavarini			19											
Massimo Pegoretti					18									
Andrea Giocondi					20									
Gennaro Di Napoli						1								
Relay team Fabio Grossi; Andrea Nuti; Roberto Mazzoleni; Ashraf Saber								2						
Ettore Ceresoli									8					
Gianni Iapichino										28				
Paolo Dal Soglio													7	

=== Women ===
Athlete	60 m	200 m	400 m	800 m	1500 m	3000 m	60 m hs	4×400 m relay	High jump	Long jump	Triple jump	Shot put	Pentathlon
Donatella Dal Bianco		18											
Elisa Rea						4							
Carla Tuzzi							13						
Barbara Lah											13		

== 2014 ==
Italy at the 2014 IAAF World Indoor Championships competed in Portland from 7 to 9 March, with 12 athletes, 3 men and 9 women.

=== Men ===
Athlete	Event	Date of birth	Personal Best	Season Best	Result	Performance
Fabio Cerutti	60 Metres	26 Sep 85	6.55	6.65	SF	6.71
Paolo Dal Molin	60 Metres Hurdles	31 Jul 87	7.51	7.60	Heat	7.76
Marco Fassinotti	High Jump	29 Apr 89	2.34 m	2.34 m	6th	2.29 m

=== Women ===
Athlete	Event	Date of birth	Personal Best	Season Best	Result	Performance
Audrey Alloh	60 Metres	21 Jul 87	7.30	7.32	Heat	7.35
Marzia Caravelli	60 Metres Hurdles	23 Oct 81	8.03	8.07	SF	7.97 PB
Giulia Pennella	60 Metres Hurdles	27 Oct 89	8.04	8.04	Heat	8.16
Marta Milani	4 x 400 Metres Relay	09 Mar 87			SF	3:31.99 NR
Maria Enrica Spacca	4 x 400 Metres Relay	20 Mar 86			SF	3:31.99 NR
Chiara Bazzoni	4 x 400 Metres Relay	05 Jul 84			SF	3:31.99 NR
Elena Maria Bonfanti	4 x 400 Metres Relay	09 Jul 88			SF	3:31.99 NR
Margherita Magnani	1500 Metres	26 Feb 87	4:06.34	4:09.27	DNS	
Margherita Magnani	3000 Metres	26 Feb 87	8:51.81	8:51.81	8th	9:10.13
Chiara Rosa	Shot Put	28 Jan 83	19.15 m	18.23 m	Qual	17.31 m

== 2016 ==
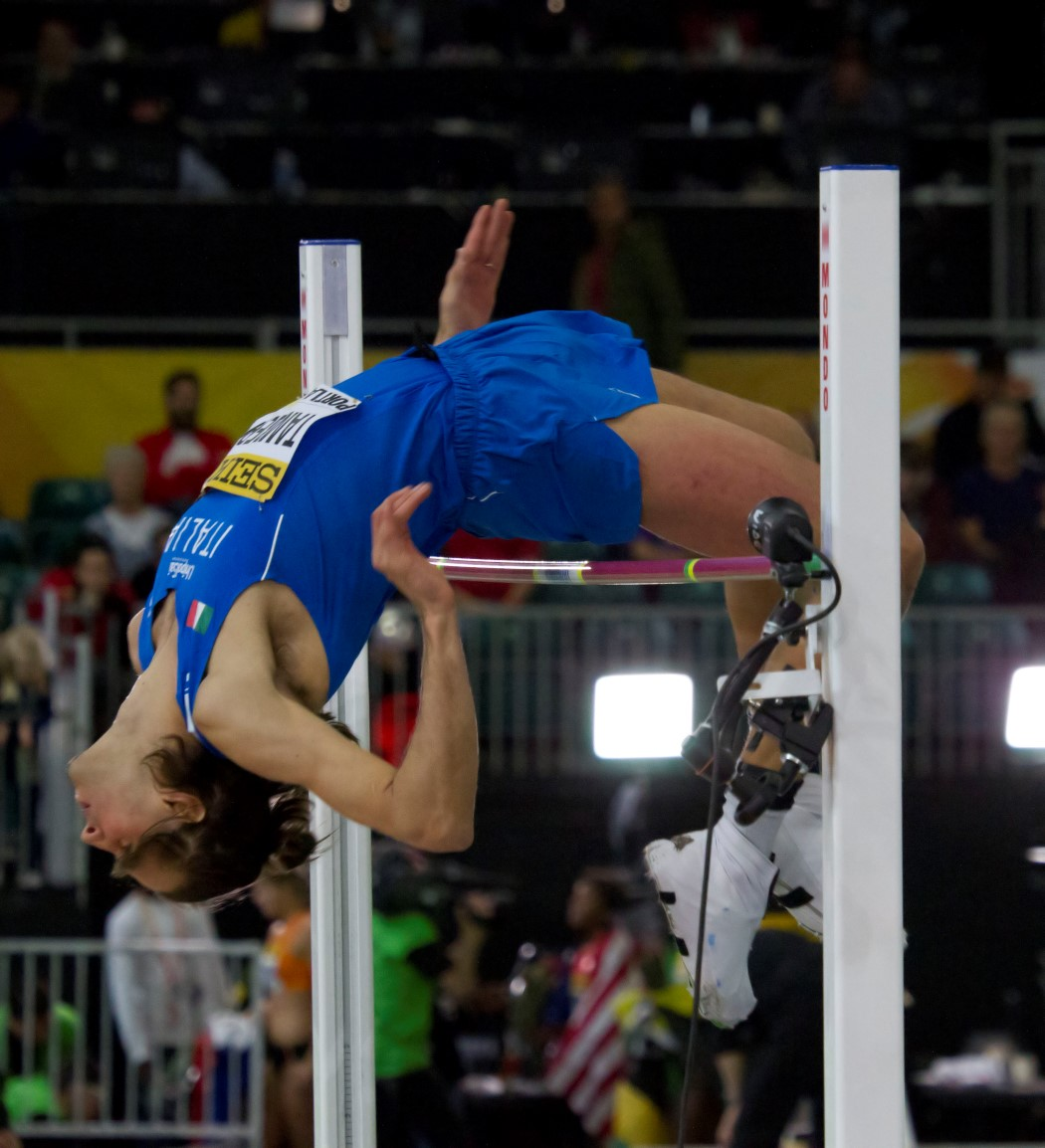
The gold medal jump of Tamberi, 2.36 m at the first attempt.

Italy at the 2016 IAAF World Indoor Championships competed from 17 to 20 March, with 5 athletes, 2 men and 3 women and won a gold medal with Gianmarco Tamberi in the high jump.

=== Men ===
Athlete	Event	Date of birth	Personal Best	Season Best	Result	Performance
Marco Fassinotti	High Jump	29 Apr 89	2.35 m	2.35 m	9th	2.25 m
Gianmarco Tamberi	High Jump	01 Jun 92	2.38 m	2.38 m	1st	2.36 m

=== Women ===
Athlete	Event	Date of birth	Personal Best	Season Best	Result	Performance
Gloria Hooper	60 Metres	03 Mar 92	7.32	7.32	SF	7.28 PB
Chiara Rosa	Shot Put	28 Jan 83	19.15 m	17.90 m	11th	17.10 m
Alessia Trost	High Jump	08 Mar 93	2.00 m	1.95 m	7th	1.93 m

== 2018 ==
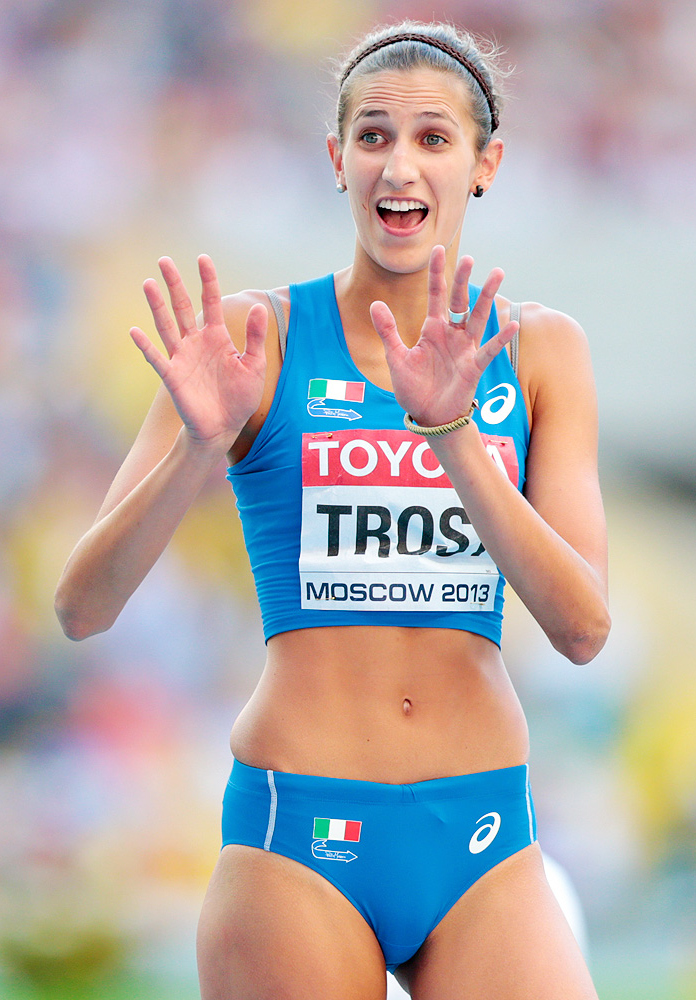
Alessia Trost, bronze medal in the high jump in 2018 edition.

Italy at the 2018 IAAF World Indoor Championships competed in Birmingham from 1 to 4 March, with 13 athletes, 4 men and 9 women.

=== Men ===
Event	Athlete	Club	Result	Performance	Notes
Triple jump	Fabrizio Donato	G.S. Fiamme Gialle	14th	15.96 m	
60 metres hurdles	Paolo Dal Molin	G.S. Fiamme Oro	Heat	7.81	
60 metres hurdles	Hassane Fofana	G.S. Fiamme Oro	Heat	7.81	
3000 metres	Yassin Bouih	G.S. Fiamme Gialle	11th	8:20.84	

=== Women ===
Event	Athlete	Club	Result	Performance	Notes
60 metres	Anna Bongiorni	C.S. Carabinieri	Semi	7.30	
60 metres hurdles	Veronica Borsi	ACSI Italia Atletica	Heat	8.27	
60 metres hurdles	Elisa Di Lazzaro	C.S. Carabinieri	Heat	8.35	
High jump	Alessia Trost	G.S. Fiamme Gialle	3rd	1.93 m	SB
400 metres	Ayomide Folorunso	G.S. Fiamme Oro	Heat	53.24	
400 metres	Raphaela Lukudo	C.S. Esercito	Semi	53.18	
4 × 400 m relay	Chiara Bazzoni; Marta Milani; Maria Enrica Spacca; Raphaela Lukudo; Ayomide Folorunso		5th	3:31.55	NR

== 2022 ==
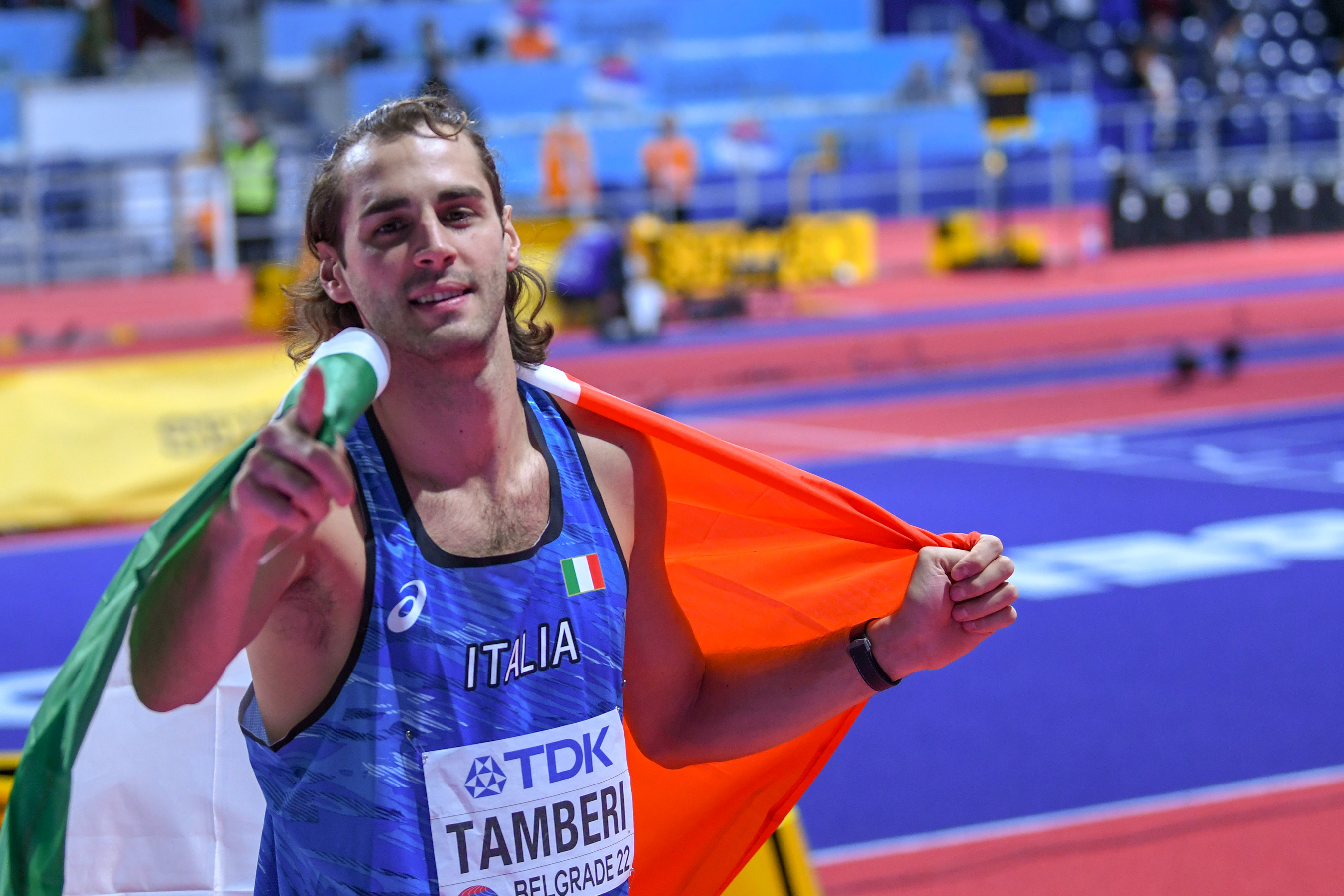
Gimbo Tamberi, bronze medal in the high jump in 2022 edition.

=== Medalists ===
Medal	Athlete	Event
1st place, gold medalist(s)	Marcell Jacobs	Men's 60 m
3rd place, bronze medalist(s)	Gianmarco Tamberi	Men's high jump

== See also ==
- Athletics in Italy
- Italy national athletics team
- Italy at the World Championships in Athletics
