= List of athletics events =

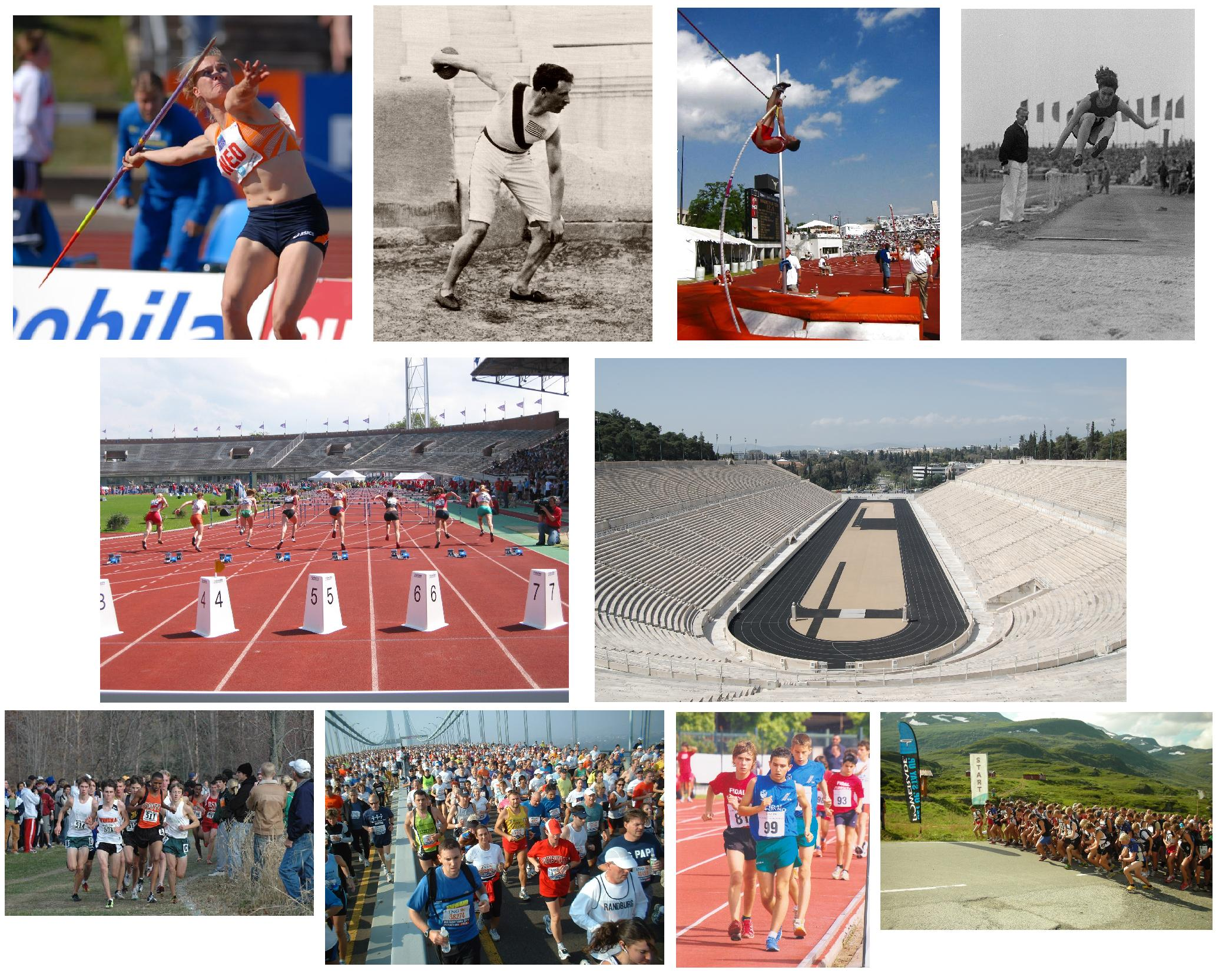
Athletics comprises a variety of running, jumping, throwing and walking events.

The sport of athletics is defined by the many events which make up its competition programmes. All events within the sport are forms of running, walking, jumping or throwing. These events are divided into the sub-sports of track and field, road running, racewalking and cross country running.

The Olympic athletics programme has played a significant role in shaping the most common events in the sport. The World Athletics Championships is the foremost World Championship event, holding the vast majority of World Championship-level events within the competition. A small number of events, such as the 60 metres, are exclusive to the World Athletics Indoor Championships.

Two further, separate World Championship events are held for their specific events: the World Athletics Half Marathon Championships and the World Athletics Cross Country Championships. Cross country is one of many events which have appeared at Olympics but no longer form part of the Olympic athletics schedule. Some events, such as the mile run, remain very popular at competitions, despite having neither Olympic nor World Championship status.

== Olympic and World Championship events ==
=== Current events ===
Event	Olympic Games		Outdoor Championships		Indoor Championships		Other World Athletics Championships		Notes
Event	Men	Women	Men	Women	Men	Women	Men	Women	Notes
60 metres	1900 – 1904				1985 – Present	1985 – Present			
100 metres	1896 – Present	1928 – Present	1983 – Present	1983 – Present					
200 metres	1900 – Present	1948 – Present	1983 – Present	1983 – Present	1985 – 2004	1985 – 2004			
400 metres	1896 – Present	1964 – Present	1983 – Present	1983 – Present	1985 – Present	1985 – Present			
800 metres	1896 – Present	1928, 1960 – Present	1983 – Present	1983 – Present	1985 – Present	1985 – Present			
1500 metres	1896 – Present	1972 – Present	1983 – Present	1983 – Present	1985 – Present	1985 – Present			
3000 metres		1984 – 1992		1983 – 1993	1985 – Present	1985 – Present			
5000 metres	1912 – Present	1996 – Present	1983 – Present	1995 – Present					
10,000 metres	1912 – Present	1988 – Present	1983 – Present	1987 – Present					
4 × 100 metres relay	1912 – Present	1928 – Present	1983 – Present	1983 – Present					
4 × 400 metres relay	1912 – Present	1972 – Present	1983 – Present	1983 – Present	1991 – Present	1991 – Present			
Mixed 4 × 400 metres relay	2020 – Present		2019 – Present						
60 metres hurdles					1985 – Present	1985 – Present			
100 metres hurdles		1972 – Present		1983 – Present					
110 metres hurdles	1896 – Present		1983 – Present						
400 metres hurdles	1900 – Present (except 1912)	1984 – Present	1983 – Present	1983 – Present					
3000 metres steeplechase	1920 – Present	2008 – Present	1983 – Present	2005 – Present					
Mile run (road)							2023 – Present	2023 – Present	World Road Running Championships
5 kilometres (road)							2023 – Present	2023 – Present	World Road Running Championships
Half-marathon (road)							1992 – Present (except 2006)	1992 – Present	Held annually as the World Half-Marathon Championships until 2010 and held biennially from 2012 to 2020; part of World Road Running Championships starting in 2023; 2006 edition replaced by a 20k run
Marathon (road)	1896 – Present	1984 – Present	1983 – Present	1983 – Present					
20 kilometres race walk (road)	1956 – Present	2000 – Present	1983 – Present	1999 – Present					
35 kilometres race walk (road)			2022 – Present	2022 – Present					
Marathon race walk mixed relay (road)	2024 – Present		2024 – Present						World Race Walking Team Championships
Cross country running	1912 – 1924						1973 – Present	1973 – Present	World Athletics Cross Country Championships
Cross country running mixed relay							2017 – Present		World Athletics Cross Country Championships
Pole vault	1896 – Present	2000 – Present	1983 – Present	1999 – Present	1985 – Present	1997 – Present			
High jump	1896 – Present	1928 – Present	1983 – Present	1983 – Present	1985 – Present	1985 – Present			
Long jump	1896 – Present	1948 – Present	1983 – Present	1983 – Present	1985 – Present	1985 – Present			
Triple jump	1896 – Present	1996 – Present	1983 – Present	1993 – Present	1985 – Present	1993 – Present			
Shot put	1896 – Present	1948 – Present	1983 – Present	1983 – Present	1985 – Present	1985 – Present			
Discus throw	1896 – Present	1928 – Present	1983 – Present	1983 – Present					
Hammer throw	1900 – Present	2000 – Present	1983 – Present	1999 – Present					
Javelin throw	1908 – Present	1932 – Present	1983 – Present	1983 – Present					
Pentathlon	1912 – 1924	1964 – 1980				1995 – Present			
Heptathlon		1984 – Present		1983 – Present	1995 – Present				
Decathlon	1912 – Present		1983 – Present						

=== Former championship events ===
Event	Olympic Games		Outdoor Championships		Indoor Championships		Other World Athletics Championships		Notes
Event	Men	Women	Men	Women	Men	Women	Men	Women	Notes
4 × 200 metres relay							2014 – 2021	2014 – 2021	
Sprint medley relay	1908								
Mixed 2 × 2 × 400 metres relay							2019 – 2021		World Relay Championships
4 × 800 metres relay							2014 – 2017	2014 – 2017	World Relay Championships
Distance medley relay							2015	2015	World Relay Championships
4 × 1500 metres relay							2014	2014	World Relay Championships
3000 metres team race	1912 – 1924								
80 metres hurdles		1932 – 1968							
200 metres hurdles	1900 – 1904								
Shuttle hurdle relay							2019 – 2021		World Relay Championships
3000 metres race walk (track)						1985 – 1993			
5000 metres race walk (track)					1985 – 1993				
10,000 metres race walk (track)	1912 – 1924, 1948 – 1952	1992 – 1996		1987 – 1997					
10 kilometres (road)								1983 – 1984	World Women's Road Race Championships
15 kilometres (road)								1985 – 1991	World Women's Road Race Championships
20 kilometres (road)							2006	2006	Replaced the half-marathon in 2006 only at the World Road Running Championships
50 kilometres race walk (road)	1932 – 2020 (except 1976)		1983 – 2019	2017 – 2019					
Marathon relay (road)							1992 – 1998	1992 – 1998	World Road Relay Championships
Cross country running short race							1998 – 2006	1998 – 2006	World Cross Country Championships
Standing high jump	1900 – 1912								
Standing long jump	1900 – 1912								
Standing triple jump	1900 – 1904								
56 pound weight throw	1904, 1920								

- NB: This list excludes Summer Olympic events which featured only once on the Olympic athletics programme during the first six editions

== Other common events ==
=== Sprints ===
- 50 metres
- 55 metres
- 100-yard dash
- 150 metres
- 200 metres straight
- 300 metres
- 440-yard dash

=== Middle-distance ===
- 1000 metres
- 1600 meters
- Mile run
- 2000 metres
- 3200 metres
- Two miles

=== Hurdles ===
- 50 metres hurdles
- 55 metres hurdles
- 300 metres hurdles
- 2000 metres steeplechase

=== Relays ===
- 4 × 110 m Shuttle hurdles relay
- Swedish relay
- Ekiden

=== Road events ===
- 5-mile run
- 10-mile run
- Quarter marathon
- 25K run
- 30K run
- 100K run
- Ultramarathon

=== Timed events ===
- One hour run
- 12-hour run
- 24-hour run
- Multi-day race

=== Misc ===
- Men's Indoor 35lb Weight Throw and Women's Indoor 20lb Weight Throw
- Octathlon, combined track and field event featured at the IAAF World Youth Championships in Athletics
- Throws pentathlon, a championship combined track and field event at the World Masters Athletics Championships
- Fierljeppen, Frisian sport of pole vaulting for distance
- Softball throw, athletics event throwing for distance using a softball

== See also ==
- List of world records in athletics
- Para-athletics
