= Ann Jansson (race walker) =

Swedish racewalker

Medal record

Women's athletics

Representing Sweden

European Championships
Silver medal – second place	1986 Stuttgart	10 km walk

World Race Walking Cup
Silver medal – second place	1981 Valencia	Team
Silver medal – second place	1979 Eschborn	Team

Ann Jansson (born 1 July 1958) is a Swedish former racewalking athlete.

== Career ==
She represented her country at the World Championships in Athletics, IAAF World Indoor Championships and six times at the IAAF World Race Walking Cup. She was a medallist at the European Athletics Championships in 1986.

She was a pioneer in the early period of international women's walking and broke several European records. Her 10 kilometres race walk time of 47:58.2 minutes in 1981 was the first ever ratified by the European Athletics Association and she improved this to 47:49.3 the following year, and twice more to 46:14.3 in 1985 and 46:13.2 in 1986. Her record was beaten that same year by Soviet walker Aleksandra Grigoryeva. Her 20 kilometres race walk time of 1:36:37 in 1985 was the best ever recorded by a European woman, though the woman's event was not an officially recognised one at that point. In world rankings, she was the world's number one 10 km walker in 1981, having been the second best to Briton Carol Tyson a year earlier.

In international competition, her greatest achievement was a silver medal in the 10 km walk at the 1986 European Athletics Championships, finishing behind Spain's Mari Cruz Díaz in the first ever women's European Championships event in walking. The following year she took part in the first World Championships event and was eleventh in the women's 10 km walk. She was also a competitor in the first major women's indoor walking races, coming fifth at the 1985 IAAF World Indoor Games, sixth at the 1987 IAAF World Indoor Championships and seventh at the 1988 European Athletics Indoor Championships. She raced at six consecutive edition of the IAAF World Race Walking Cup from 1979 to 1989, with her best finish being fifth in 1981. She was twice a team silver medallist with Sweden at that event.

Jansson was a dominant figure at national level. At the Swedish Athletics Championships she was a twenty-time national champion. She won the 3000 m title from 1979 to 1986 (interrupted once by Britt Holmquist in 1980), won six 5000 m titles from 1980 to 1987 (losing twice to Siv Gustafsson) and won seven 10 km road titles from 1980 to 1987 (losing to Gustafsson in 1984). At regional level, she was a five-time champion at the Nordic Race Walking Championships (three in 5 km, twice in 10 km).

Jansson was twice winner at the prestigious annual Coppa Città di Sesto San Giovanni meet.

== Personal bests ==
- 3000 metres race walk – 13:04.29 min (1987)
- 5 kilometres race walk – 23:08 min (1987)
- 10 kilometres race walk – 45:24 min (1987)
- 20 kilometres race walk – 1:34:59 min (1987)

== International competitions ==
Year	Competition	Venue	Position	Event	Notes
1976	Nordic Indoor Race Walking Championships	Östersund, Sweden	2nd	3000 m walk (junior)	15:10
1979	World Race Walking Cup	Eschborn, West Germany	17th	5 km walk	24:45
1979	World Race Walking Cup	Eschborn, West Germany	2nd	Team	74 pts
1979	Nordic Race Walking Championships	Härnösand, Sweden	2nd	5000 m walk	24:19
1981	World Race Walking Cup	Valencia, Spain	5th	5 km walk	23:42.2
1981	World Race Walking Cup	Valencia, Spain	2nd	Team	104 pts
1981	Nordic Race Walking Championships	Frøya, Norway	1st	5 km walk	23:57
1983	World Race Walking Cup	Bergen, Norway	14th	10 km walk	47:42
1983	World Race Walking Cup	Bergen, Norway	4th	Team	118 pts
1983	Nordic Race Walking Championships	Copenhagen, Denmark	1st	10 km walk	48:27
1985	World Indoor Games	Paris, France	5th	3000 m walk	13:47.18
1985	World Race Walking Cup	St John's, Isle of Man	11th	10 km walk	47:16
1985	World Race Walking Cup	St John's, Isle of Man	5th	Team	58 pts
1985	Nordic Race Walking Championships	Pori, Finland	1st	5000 m walk	22:17.1
1985	Nordic Race Walking Championships	Pori, Finland	1st	10,000 m walk	46:39.2
1986	European Championships	Stuttgart, West Germany	2nd	10 km walk	46.14
1987	World Indoor Championships	Indianapolis, United States	6th	3000 m walk	13:04.29
1987	World Race Walking Cup	New York City, United States	9th	10 km walk	45:24
1987	World Race Walking Cup	New York City, United States	7th	Team	146 pts
1987	Nordic Race Walking Championships	Gimo, Sweden	1st	5 km walk	22:06
1987	World Championships	Rome, Italy	11th	10 km walk	46:15
1988	European Indoor Championships	Budapest, Hungary	7th	3000 m walk	13:09.04
1989	World Race Walking Cup	L'Hospitalet, Spain	43rd	10 km walk	48:15
1989	World Race Walking Cup	L'Hospitalet, Spain	12th	Team	137 pts

== National titles ==
- Swedish Athletics Championships
  - 3000 m walk: 1979, 1981, 1982, 1983, 1984, 1985, 1986
  - 5000 m walk: 1980, 1982, 1984, 1985, 1986, 1987
  - 10 km walk: 1980, 1981, 1982, 1983, 1985, 1986, 1987
