= Alföldi =

Alföldi or Alföldy is a Hungarian surname. Alföld is Great Hungarian Plain. Notable people with the surname include:

- Andrea Alföldi (born 1964), Hungarian racewalker
- Andreas Alföldi (1895–1981), Hungarian historian
- Géza Alföldy, (1935–2011), Hungarian historian
- Róbert Alföldi (born 1967), Hungarian actor, theatre director and television host
