= Salce (surname) =

Salce is a surname. Notable people with the surname include:

- Giuliana Salce (born 1955), Italian race walker
- Luciano Salce (1922–1989), Italian film director
