= Alberto Corvo =

Italian middle-distance runner

Personal information
- National team: Italy: 6 caps (1983-1987)
- Born: 14 April 1963 (age 63) Latina, Italy

Sport
- Sport: Athletics
- Event: Middle-distance running
- Club: G.S. Fiamme Gialle (1984-1989)

Achievements and titles
- Personal bests: 1500 m: 3:39.30 (1986); Mile: 4:00.35 (1985)

Alberto Corvo (born 14 April 1963) is a former Italian middle-distance runner who was 6th in the 1500 m at the World Athletics Indoor Championships in 1985.

== Achievements ==
Year	Competition	Venue	Rank	Event	Time	Notes
1985	World Indoor Championships	(France) Paris	6th	1500 m	3:45.46	

== See also ==
- Italy at the World Athletics Indoor Championships
