= Alejandra Flores (athlete) =

Personal information
- Born: 1961 (age 64–65)

Sport
- Sport: Athletics
- Event(s): 100 metres, 200 metres
Medal record
Representing Mexico
Central American and Caribbean Games
Bronze medal – third place	1986 Santiago	4x100m relay

Alejandra Flores (born 1961) is a retired Mexican sprinter. She won several medals at regional level.

== International competitions ==
Year	Competition	Venue	Position	Event	Notes
Representing Mexico
1978	Central American and Caribbean; Junior Championships (U20)	Xalapa, Mexico	5th	100 m	12.73
1978	Central American and Caribbean; Junior Championships (U20)	Xalapa, Mexico	7th	200 m	26.30
1978	Central American and Caribbean; Junior Championships (U20)	Xalapa, Mexico	3rd	4 × 100 m relay	49.12
1979	Universiade	Mexico City, Mexico	23rd (h)	100 m	12.89
1982	Central American and Caribbean Games	Havana, Cuba	7th	4 × 100 m relay	47.41
1983	Universiade	Edmonton, Canada	17th (h)	100 m	12.21
1983	Universiade	Edmonton, Canada	12th (sf)	200 m	24.87
1985	World Indoor Games	Paris, France	9th (sf)	60 m	7.67
1985	World Indoor Games	Paris, France	7th (h)	200 m	25.54
1985	Central American and Caribbean Championships	Nassau, Bahamas	2nd	4 × 100 m relay	46.04
1986	Central American and Caribbean Games	Santiago, Dominican Republic	9th (h)	100 m	12.01
1986	Central American and Caribbean Games	Santiago, Dominican Republic	3rd	4 × 100 m relay	45.58
1986	Ibero-American Championships	Havana, Cuba	5th	200 m	24.32 (w)
1986	Ibero-American Championships	Havana, Cuba	1st	4 × 100 m relay	45.95
1986	Ibero-American Championships	Havana, Cuba	3rd	4 × 400 m relay	3:44.71
1987	Central American and Caribbean Championships	Caracas, Venezuela	2nd	100 m	12.01
1987	Central American and Caribbean Championships	Caracas, Venezuela	2nd	4 × 100 m relay	46.25
1987	Pan American Games	Indianapolis, United States	13th (sf)	100 m	11.81
1987	Pan American Games	Indianapolis, United States	5th	4 × 100 m relay	46.29
1988	Ibero-American Championships	Mexico City, Mexico	10th (h)	100 m	11.72
1988	Ibero-American Championships	Mexico City, Mexico	11th (h)	200 m	24.45
1988	Ibero-American Championships	Mexico City, Mexico	2nd	4 × 100 m relay	45.20
1991	Central American and Caribbean Championships	Xalapa, Mexico	3rd	100 m	12.18
1991	Central American and Caribbean Championships	Xalapa, Mexico	2nd	4 × 100 m relay	46.57

== Personal bests ==
Outdoor

- 100 metres – 11.72 (Mexico 1988)

Indoor

- 60 metres – 7.67 (Paris 1985)
- 200 metres – 25.54 (Paris 1985)
