= 1985 IAAF World Indoor Games – Women's 60 metres =

Sports event

The women's 60 metres event at the 1985 IAAF World Indoor Games was held at the Palais Omnisports Paris-Bercy on 19 January.

== Medalists ==
Gold	Silver	Bronze
Silke Gladisch; East Germany	Heather Oakes; Great Britain	Christelle Bulteau; France

== Results ==
=== Heats ===
First 3 of each heat (Q) and next 3 fastest (q) qualified for the semifinals.

Rank	Heat	Name	Nationality	Time	Notes
1	2	Christelle Bulteau	France	7.36	Q
1	3	Heather Oakes	Great Britain	7.36	Q
3	1	Silke Gladisch	East Germany	7.39	Q
4	2	Lyudmila Kondratyeva	Soviet Union	7.42	Q
5	1	Kim Robertson	New Zealand	7.45	Q
6	1	Gillian Forde	Trinidad and Tobago	7.50	Q
7	3	Angella Taylor	Canada	7.65	Q
8	2	Alejandra Flores	Mexico	7.70	Q
9	2	Sabine Seitl	Austria	7.75	q
10	3	Shen Shu-foog	Chinese Taipei	7.79	Q
11	1	Noha Samaha	Lebanon	7.81	q, NR
12	1	María Báez	Dominican Republic	7.82	q, NR
13	3	Elma Muros	Philippines	7.99	
14	3	Hikmat Bartouche	South Yemen	8.91	NR

=== Semifinals ===
First 3 of each semifinal (Q) qualified directly for the final.

Rank	Heat	Name	Nationality	Time	Notes
1	2	Heather Oakes	Great Britain	7.23	Q
2	2	Silke Gladisch	East Germany	7.24	Q
3	1	Lyudmila Kondratyeva	Soviet Union	7.33	Q
4	1	Christelle Bulteau	France	7.35	Q
5	1	Kim Robertson	New Zealand	7.43	Q, NR
6	2	Gillian Forde	Trinidad and Tobago	7.51	Q
7	2	Angella Taylor	Canada	7.52	
8	2	Shen Shu-foog	Chinese Taipei	7.64	NR
9	1	Alejandra Flores	Mexico	7.67	NR
10	1	Sabine Seitl	Austria	7.71	
11	2	Noha Samaha	Lebanon	7.93	
	1	María Báez	Dominican Republic	DNS	

=== Final ===
Rank	Lane	Name	Nationality	Time	Notes
1st place, gold medalist(s)	2	Silke Gladisch	East Germany	7.20	
2nd place, silver medalist(s)	3	Heather Oakes	Great Britain	7.21	PB
3rd place, bronze medalist(s)	5	Christelle Bulteau	France	7.34	
4	4	Lyudmila Kondratyeva	Soviet Union	7.36	
5	1	Kim Robertson	New Zealand	7.43	=NR
6	6	Gillian Forde	Trinidad and Tobago	7.59	
