= Mario Lega (athlete) =

Italian long jumper

Personal information
- National team: Italy: 8 caps (1978-1985)
- Born: 10 January 1957 (age 69) Molinella, Italy

Sport
- Sport: Athletics
- Event: Long jump
- Club: Virtus Bologna (1976-1979); Fiat Iveco (1980-1983); Pro Patria Milano (1985-1986)
- Retired: 1986

Achievements and titles
- Personal best: Long jump: 7.95 m (1980)

Mario Lega (born 10 January 1957) is a former Italian long jumper who was 10th in the long jump at the World Athletics Indoor Championships in 1985 and won two national championships at individual senior level.

Lega was also the Italian long jump record holder for one year.

== National records ==
- Long jump: 7.95 m ( (Italy) Salsomaggiore, 30 April 1980) - record holder until 11 April 1981.

== Achievements ==
Year	Competition	Venue	Rank	Event	Time	Notes
1985	World Indoor Championships	(France) Paris	10th	Long jump	3:45.46	

== National titles ==
Lega won two national championships at individual senior level.

- Italian Athletics Indoor Championships
  - Long jump: 1979, 1985 (2)

== See also ==
- Men's long jump Italian record progression
- Italy at the World Athletics Indoor Championships
