= 1989 European Athletics Indoor Championships – Women's 3000 metres walk =

The women's 3000 metres walk event at the 1989 European Athletics Indoor Championships was held on 18 and 19 February.

== Medalists ==
Gold	Silver	Bronze
Beate Anders; East Germany	Ileana Salvador; Italy	María Reyes Sobrino; Spain

== Results ==
=== Heats ===
First 4 from each heat (Q) and the next 4 fastest (q) qualified for the final.

Rank	Heat	Name	Nationality	Time	Notes
1	2	Ileana Salvador	Italy	13:08.87	Q
2	2	Beate Anders	East Germany	13:08.93	Q
3	2	Monica Gunnarsson	Sweden	13:09.45	Q
4	2	Dana Vavřačová	Czechoslovakia	13:09.90	Q
5	2	Olga Sánchez	Spain	13:10.85	q
6	2	Andrea Brückmann	West Germany	13:11.29	q
7	1	María Reyes Sobrino	Spain	13:26.71	Q
8	1	Anikó Szebenszky	Hungary	13:27.10	Q
9	1	Andrea Alföldi	Hungary	13:27.12	Q
10	1	Erica Alfridi	Italy	13:28.06	Q
11	1	Alina Ivanova	Soviet Union	13:31.32	q
12	1	Valeria Todorova	Bulgaria	13:52.10	q
13	1	Kristin Andreassen	Norway	13:53.53	
14	2	Anita Blomberg	Norway	14:06.21	
	1	Karin Jensen	Denmark	DNF	
	2	Mária Urbanik-Rosza	Hungary	DQ	
	2	Atanaska Dzhivkova	Bulgaria	DQ	

=== Final ===
Rank	Name	Nationality	Time	Notes
1st place, gold medalist(s)	Beate Anders	East Germany	12:21.91	CR
2nd place, silver medalist(s)	Ileana Salvador	Italy	12:32.40	
3rd place, bronze medalist(s)	María Reyes Sobrino	Spain	12:39.50	
4	Dana Vavřačová	Czechoslovakia	12:42.00	
5	Olga Sánchez	Spain	12:43.49	
6	Andrea Alföldi	Hungary	12:43.62	
7	Anikó Szebenszky	Hungary	12:44.37	
8	Monica Gunnarsson	Sweden	12:54.52	
9	Andrea Brückmann	West Germany	12:57.07	
10	Alina Ivanova	Soviet Union	12:57.36	
11	Erica Alfridi	Italy	13:04.71	
12	Valeria Todorova	Bulgaria	13:06.68	
