= 1985 IAAF World Indoor Games – Women's 200 metres =

The women's 200 metres event at the 1985 IAAF World Indoor Games was held at the Palais Omnisports Paris-Bercy on 18 January.

== Medalists ==
| Gold | Silver | Bronze |
|---|---|---|
| Marita Koch; East Germany | Marie-Christine Cazier; France | Kim Robertson; New Zealand |

== Results ==
=== Heats ===
First 2 of each heat (Q) and the next 2 fastest (q) qualified for the final.

| Rank | Heat | Name | Nationality | Time | Notes |
|---|---|---|---|---|---|
| 1 | 2 | Marita Koch | East Germany | 23.53 | Q |
| 2 | 2 | Marie-Christine Cazier | France | 23.74 | Q |
| 3 | 1 | Fabienne Ficher | France | 23.86 | Q |
| 4 | 1 | Kim Robertson | New Zealand | 23.91 | Q |
| 5 | 1 | Mary Bolden | United States | 24.25 | q |
| 6 | 2 | Semra Aksu | Turkey | 24.56 | q |
| 7 | 2 | Alejandra Flores | Mexico | 25.54 | NR |
| 8 | 1 | María Báez | Dominican Republic | 26.47 | NR |

=== Final ===
| Rank | Lane | Name | Nationality | Time | Notes |
|---|---|---|---|---|---|
| 1st place, gold medalist(s) | 2 | Marita Koch | East Germany | 23.09 | |
| 2nd place, silver medalist(s) | 5 | Marie-Christine Cazier | France | 23.33 | NR |
| 3rd place, bronze medalist(s) | 4 | Kim Robertson | New Zealand | 23.69 | AR |
| 4 | 3 | Fabienne Ficher | France | 23.75 | |
| 5 | 6 | Mary Bolden | United States | 23.89 | |
| 6 | 1 | Semra Aksu | Turkey | 24.97 | |
