= 1985 IAAF World Indoor Games – Women's 800 metres =

The women's 800 metres event at the 1985 IAAF World Indoor Games was held at the Palais Omnisports Paris-Bercy on 19 January.

== Results ==
Rank	Name	Nationality	Time	Notes
1st place, gold medalist(s)	Cristieana Cojocaru	Romania	2:04.22	
2nd place, silver medalist(s)	Jane Finch	Great Britain	2:04.71	
3rd place, bronze medalist(s)	Mariana Simeanu	Romania	2:05.51	
4	Nathalie Thoumas	France	2:07.63	
5	Shiny Abraham	India	2:08.09	NR
6	Fatima Aouam	Morocco	2:12.16	NR
7	Isabelle De Bruycker	Belgium	2:14.54	
