= 1987 IAAF World Indoor Championships – Women's 3000 metres walk =

The women's 3000 metres walk event at the 1987 IAAF World Indoor Championships was held at the Hoosier Dome in Indianapolis on 6 March.

== Results ==
Rank	Name	Nationality	Time	Notes
1st place, gold medalist(s)	Olga Krishtop	Soviet Union	12:05.49	WR, CR
2nd place, silver medalist(s)	Giuliana Salce	Italy	12:36.76	
3rd place, bronze medalist(s)	Ann Peel	Canada	12:38.97	AR
4	Dana Vavřačová	Czechoslovakia	12:47.49	NR
5	Emilia Cano	Spain	13:02.41	PB
6	Ann Jansson	Sweden	13:04.29	NR
7	Mirva Hämäläinen	Finland	13:08.42	NR
8	Maryanne Torrellas	United States	13:10.30	
9	Shi Xiaoling	China	13:14.55	PB
10	Kjersti Plätzer	Norway	13:18.35	NR
11	María Colín	Mexico	13:23.45	NR
12	Teresa Palacio	Spain	13:28.09	
13	Teresa Vaill	United States	13:32.82	
14	Suzanne Griesbach	France	13:33.33	
15	Sue Cook	Australia	13:45.75	AR
16	Graciela Mendoza	Mexico	14:01.21	
17	Alison Baker	Canada	14:22.75	
	Kerry Saxby	Australia	DQ	
	Chen Zhimin	China	DQ	
