= Athletics at the 1983 Summer Universiade – Women's 200 metres =

The women's 200 metres event at the 1983 Summer Universiade was held at the Commonwealth Stadium in Edmonton, Canada on 8, 9 and 10 July 1983.

== Medalists ==
Gold	Silver	Bronze
Randy Givens; United States	Marita Payne; Canada	Grace Jackson; Jamaica

== Results ==
=== Heats ===
Wind:
Heat 1: -1.0 m/s Heat 2: ? m/s, Heat 3: +1.0 m/s

Rank	Heat	Athlete	Nationality	Time	Notes
1	3	Randy Givens	United States	22.59	Q
2	3	Marita Payne	Canada	22.74	Q
3	1	LaShon Nedd	United States	22.89	Q
4	1	Grace Jackson	Jamaica	23.09	Q
5	2	Angella Taylor	Canada	23.10	Q
6	2	Irina Olkhovnikova	Soviet Union	23.61	Q
7	3	Marina Molokova	Soviet Union	23.63	Q
8	1	Marisa Masullo	Italy	23.67	Q
9	3	Leanne Evans	Australia	24.00	Q
10	2	Carla Mercurio	Italy	24.11	Q
11	2	Elke Vollmer	West Germany	24.20	Q
12	3	Elsia Thomas	Jamaica	24.23	q
13	1	Alejandra Flores	Mexico	24.73	Q
14	3	Nazel Kyomo	Tanzania	24.87	q
15	1	Noelia Shillingford	Dominican Republic	25.25	q
16	2	Selma Anene	Tunisia	26.31	q
17	2	May Sardouk	Lebanon	27.25	
18	3	Maria Gourgel	Angola	28.46	q

=== Semifinals ===
Wind:
Heat 1: -0.9 m/s, Heat 2: ? m/s

Rank	Heat	Athlete	Nationality	Time	Notes
1	2	Randy Givens	United States	22.69	Q
2	2	Grace Jackson	Jamaica	22.84	Q
3	1	Marita Payne	Canada	22.95	Q
4	2	Angella Taylor	Canada	23.00	Q
5	1	Marisa Masullo	Italy	23.09	Q
6	1	LaShon Nedd	United States	23.12	Q
7	1	Irina Olkhovnikova	Soviet Union	23.25	q
8	2	Marina Molokova	Soviet Union	23.75	q
9	2	Carla Mercurio	Italy	23.92	
10	1	Leanne Evans	Australia	24.13	
11	1	Elsia Thomas	Jamaica	24.32	
12	2	Alejandra Flores	Mexico	24.87	
13	1	Noelia Shillingford	Dominican Republic	25.57	
14	2	Selma Anene	Tunisia	25.96	
	?	Elke Vollmer	West Germany	??.??	
	?	Nazel Kyomo	Tanzania	??.??	

=== Final ===
Wind: +0.6 m/s

Rank	Athlete	Nationality	Time	Notes
1st place, gold medalist(s)	Randy Givens	United States	22.47	
2nd place, silver medalist(s)	Marita Payne	Canada	22.62	
3rd place, bronze medalist(s)	Grace Jackson	Jamaica	22.69	
4	Angella Taylor	Canada	22.94	
5	Marisa Masullo	Italy	23.00	
6	Irina Olkhovnikova	Soviet Union	23.31	
7	LaShon Nedd	United States	23.37	
8	Marina Molokova	Soviet Union	23.62	
