= María Reyes Sobrino =

Spanish racewalker (born 1967)

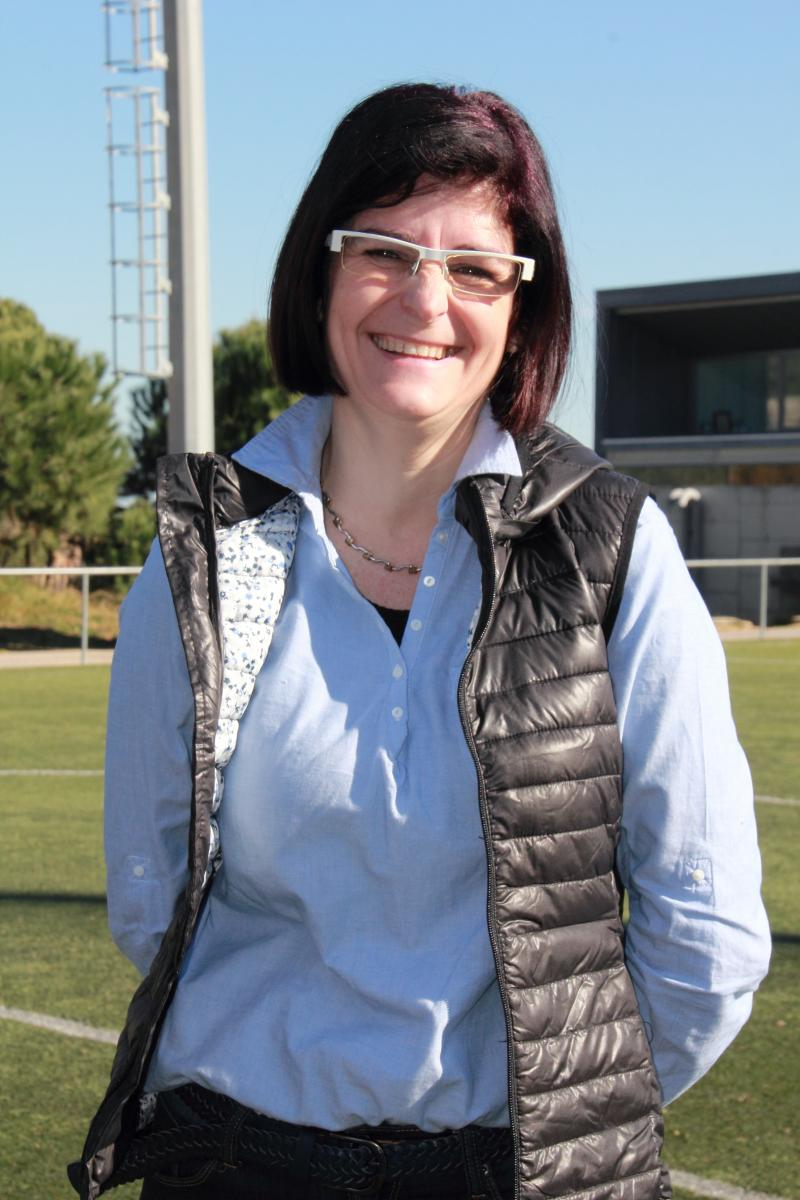
- Reyes Sobrino in 2015

Medal record

Women's athletics

Representing Spain

European Indoor Championships
Gold medal – first place	1988 Budapest	3000 m walk
Bronze medal – third place	1989 The Hague	3000 m walk

María Reyes Sobrino Jiménez (born 6 January 1967) is a Spanish former racewalking athlete who competed mainly in the 3000 metres race walk and 10 kilometres race walk. Her greatest achievement was a gold medal at the European Athletics Indoor Championships in 1988. She was a five-time participant at the IAAF World Racewalking Cup and twice a World Championships in Athletics competitor.

== Career ==
Reyes was born in Viladecans, near Barcelona. Her father was a founding member of the local athletics club – Club Atletismo Viladecans – and this was where she picked up the sport. She began her international career in 1985, making her global debut at the 1985 IAAF World Race Walking Cup, then winning the gold medal at the 1985 European Athletics Junior Championships. Her best finish at a major outdoor tournament followed at the 1986 European Athletics Championships, where she was fifth, and her first senior medal came a year later at the 1987 IAAF World Race Walking Cup, sharing in the women's team silver alongside Teresa Palacio, Mari Cruz Díaz and Emilia Cano. She placed ninth at the 1987 World Championships in Athletics, which was the first ever women's world championship race walk.

Reyes enjoyed her best year in 1988, in which she became continental champion at the 1988 European Athletics Indoor Championships with a 3000 m walk win in a championship record time of 12:48.99 minutes. She claimed a 10,000 m walk bronze at the 1988 Ibero-American Championships in Athletics outdoors. She would go on to win a further European indoor bronze medal in 1989 and took the Ibero-American title in 1990. She walked at the 1991 World Championships in Athletics and made three further appearances at the World Race Walking Cup but was largely out of contention, though she did place seventh at the 1990 European Athletics Championships.

She was a dominant figure nationally during her period, winning a total of 13 Spanish titles in her career – ahead of her contemporaries Palacio, Cruz Díaz and Cano. She was the inaugural winner of the 3000 m indoor title in 1984 and set a championship record of 12:42.29 minutes in 1989. She won five straight titles at the Spanish Athletics Championships from 1987 to 1991 in the 5000 m and 10,000 m distances, with her best of 22:09.21 minutes in the former distance being a championship record. At the national road walking championships, she won five titles between 1985 and 1993. She was a Spanish record holder in 3000 m, 5000 m, 10,000 m, 5 km and 10 km events during her career.

On the professional circuit she was the 1984 winner at the Coppa Città di Sesto San Giovanni and set a meeting record at the 1990 Míting Internacional d´Atletisme Ciutat de Barcelona. She took up coaching following her retirement and among those she trained was Beatriz Pascual, a fellow Viladecans native.

== International competitions ==
Year	Competition	Venue	Position	Event	Notes
1985	World Race Walking Cup	St John's, Isle of Man	23rd	10 km walk	49:31
1985	European Junior Championships	Cottbus, East Germany	1st	5000 m walk	22:56.84
1986	European Championships	Stuttgart, West Germany	5th	10 km walk	46.35
1987	World Race Walking Cup	New York City, United States	15th	10 km walk	46:22
1987	World Race Walking Cup	New York City, United States	2nd	Team	174 pts
1987	World Championships	Rome, Italy	9th	10 km walk	45:37
1988	European Indoor Championships	Budapest, Hungary	1st	3000 m walk	12:48.99 CR
1988	Ibero-American Championships	Mexico City, Mexico	3rd	10,000 m walk	52:00.4
1989	European Indoor Championships	The Hague, Netherlands	3rd	3000 m walk	12:39.50
1989	IAAF World Indoor Championships	Budapest, Hungary	—	3000 m walk	DQ
1989	World Race Walking Cup	Barcelona, Spain	40th	10 km walk	48:07
1990	European Championships	Split, Yugoslavia	7th	10 km walk	45.42
1990	Ibero-American Championships	Manaus, Brazil	1st	10,000 m walk	46:36.40
1991	World Race Walking Cup	San Jose, United States	52nd	10 km walk	50:10
1991	World Championships	Tokyo, Japan	29th	10 km walk	47:31
1993	World Race Walking Cup	Monterrey, Mexico	74th	10 km walk	54:43

== National titles ==
- Spanish Athletics Championships
  - 5000 m walk: 1987, 1988, 1989
  - 10,000 m walk: 1990, 1991
  - 10 km walk: 1985, 1988, 1989, 1990, 1993
- Spanish Indoor Athletics Championships
  - 3000 m walk: 1984, 1986, 1989

== Personal bests ==
- 3000 metres race walk – 12:27.82 min (1989)
- 5000 metres race walk – 21:57.86 min (1990)
- 5 kilometres race walk – 21:25 min (1987)
- 10,000 metres race walk – 46:04.05 min (1989)
- 10 kilometres race walk – 44:16 min (1990)

All information from All Athletics

== See also ==
- List of European Athletics Indoor Championships medalists (women)
