= 1985 IAAF World Indoor Games – Men's long jump =

The men's long jump event at the 1985 IAAF World Indoor Games was held at the Palais Omnisports Paris-Bercy on 19 January.

== Results ==
Rank	Name	Nationality	#1	#2	#3	#4	#5	#6	Result	Notes
1st place, gold medalist(s)	Jan Leitner	Czechoslovakia	x	7.59	7.95	x	x	7.96	7.96	
2nd place, silver medalist(s)	Gyula Pálóczi	Hungary	7.47	7.83	x	7.78	7.92	7.94	7.94	
3rd place, bronze medalist(s)	Giovanni Evangelisti	Italy	7.68	7.63	7.79	7.80	7.88	7.65	7.88	
4	László Szalma	Hungary	7.59	7.73	x	7.83	7.82	7.85	7.85	
5	Emiel Mellaard	Netherlands	x	7.78	6.93	x	x	x	7.78	
6	Serge Hélan	France	x	7.47	7.55	7.46	7.71	x	7.71	
7	Liu Yuhuang	China	7.45	7.36	7.64	x	x	x	7.64	
8	Junichi Usui	Japan	7.39	7.32	7.45	7.44	7.52	7.41	7.52	
9	Ján Čado	Czechoslovakia	x	x	7.40				7.40	
10	Mario Lega	Italy	7.29	7.33	7.31				7.33	
11	Kim Jong-Il	South Korea	x	7.31	x				7.31	
12	Marcus Barros	Brazil	7.24	7.07	x				7.24	
13	John Hunt	New Zealand	6.90	6.86	7.14				7.14	
14	Wanis Barsomian	Syria	6.83	x	6.65				6.83	NR
