= 1985 IAAF World Indoor Games – Women's 3000 metres walk =

The women's 3000 metres walk event at the 1985 IAAF World Indoor Games was held at the Palais Omnisports Paris-Bercy on 18 January.

== Results ==
Rank	Name	Nationality	Time	Notes
1st place, gold medalist(s)	Giuliana Salce	Italy	12:53.42	NR
2nd place, silver medalist(s)	Yan Hong	China	13:05.56	AR
3rd place, bronze medalist(s)	Ann Peel	Canada	13:06.97	
4	Dana Vavřačová	Czechoslovakia	13:29.06	
5	Ann Jansson	Sweden	13:47.18	
6	Teresa Vaill	United States	13:59.56	
7	Suzanne Griesbach	France	14:22.21	
8	Synnøve Olsen	Norway	14:22.40	
9	Karin Jensen	Denmark	14:40.59	NR
10	Ingrid Adam	West Germany	14:54.67	
