= Athletics at the 1991 Summer Universiade – Women's 10 kilometres walk =

The women's 10 kilometres walk event at the 1991 Summer Universiade was held at the Don Valley Stadium in Sheffield on 23 July 1991. This was the first time that this event was held at the Universiade replacing the 5 kilometres distance.

== Results ==
Rank	Athlete	Nationality	Time	Notes
1st place, gold medalist(s)	Sari Essayah	Finland	44:04	GR
2nd place, silver medalist(s)	Chen Yueling	China	44:33	
3rd place, bronze medalist(s)	Annarita Sidoti	Italy	45:10	
4	Olga Leonenko	Soviet Union	45:47	
5	Lynn Weik	United States	45:56	
6	Olga Sánchez	Spain	46:15	
7	Tina Poitras	Canada	46:25	
8	Andrea Alföldi	Hungary	46:41	
9	Ibolya Varadi	Hungary	48:02	
10	Viera Toporek	Austria	48:17	
11	Elisabetta Perrone	Italy	48:50	
12	Francisca Martínez	Mexico	49:11	
13	Karianne Larsen	Norway	50:26	
14	Sara Standley	United States	53:11	
	Victoria Lupton	Great Britain	DQ	
	Nina Alyushenko	Soviet Union	DQ	
