= 1985 IAAF World Indoor Games – Men's 5000 metres walk =

The men's 5000 metres walk event at the 1985 IAAF World Indoor Games was held at the Palais Omnisports Paris-Bercy on 19 January 1985.

The winning margin was 5.19 seconds which is the only time this event for men was won by more than four seconds at these championships. Since this event was discontinued after the 1993 championships, this record cannot be broken.

== Results ==
Rank	Name	Nationality	Time	Notes
1st place, gold medalist(s)	Gérard Lelièvre	France	19:06.22	NR
2nd place, silver medalist(s)	Maurizio Damilano	Italy	19:11.41	
3rd place, bronze medalist(s)	David Smith	Australia	19:16.04	
4	Roman Mrázek	Czechoslovakia	19:39.73	
5	Jan Staaf	Sweden	20:00.95	
6	Jim Heiring	United States	20:11.69	
7	Jorge Llopart	Spain	20:39.83	
8	Erling Andersen	Norway	21:07.43	
