= 1985 IAAF World Indoor Games – Women's 400 metres =

The women's 400 metres event at the 1985 IAAF World Indoor Games was held at the Palais Omnisports Paris-Bercy on 19 January.

== Results ==
Rank	Name	Nationality	Time	Notes
1st place, gold medalist(s)	Diane Dixon	United States	53.35	
2nd place, silver medalist(s)	Regine Berg	Belgium	53.81	
3rd place, bronze medalist(s)	Charmaine Crooks	Canada	54.08	
4	Antonella Ratti	Italy	55.30	
5	Oddný Árnadóttir	Iceland	56.94	
	Giannina Otoya	Peru	DNS	
