= 1985 IAAF World Indoor Games – Women's long jump =

The women's long jump event at the 1985 IAAF World Indoor Games was held at the Palais Omnisports Paris-Bercy on 19 January.

== Results ==
Rank	Name	Nationality	#1	#2	#3	#4	#5	#6	Result	Notes
1st place, gold medalist(s)	Helga Radtke	East Germany	6.74	6.72	6.81	6.82	6.86	6.88	6.88	
2nd place, silver medalist(s)	Tatyana Rodionova	Soviet Union	6.50	6.54	x	6.69	6.72	6.68	6.72	
3rd place, bronze medalist(s)	Nijolé Medvedeva	Soviet Union	x	6.41	x	6.30	6.44	6.43	6.44	
4	Lene Demsitz	Denmark	6.08	6.20	6.38	6.16	6.35	6.17	6.38	
5	Nicole Boegman	Australia	5.86	6.01	6.19	x	6.14	x	6.19	
6	Silvia Khristova	Bulgaria	6.12	6.17	6.00	6.15	6.08	5.98	6.17	
7	Shonel Ferguson	Bahamas	6.08	x	6.02	x	6.00	5.70	6.08	
8	Géraldine Bonnin	France	6.06	x	6.01	5.75	5.74	5.81	6.06	
9	Sabine Seitl	Austria	5.92	5.89	5.73				5.92	
10	Monika Staubli	Switzerland	5.87	5.73	5.91				5.91	
11	Angie Thacker	United States	x	x	5.83				5.83	
	Liao Wenfen	China	x	x	x				NM	
