= 1989 IAAF World Indoor Championships – Women's 3000 metres walk =

The women's 3000 metres walk event at the 1989 IAAF World Indoor Championships was held at the Budapest Sportcsarnok in Budapest on 3 and 4 March.

== Medalists ==
Gold	Silver	Bronze
Kerry Saxby; Australia	Beate Anders; East Germany	Ileana Salvador; Italy

== Results ==
=== Heats ===
First 2 of each heat (Q) and next 6 fastest (q) qualified for the final.

Rank	Heat	Name	Nationality	Time	Notes
1	1	Nadezhda Ryashkina	Soviet Union	12:20.28	Q, PB
2	1	Beate Anders	East Germany	12:22.22	Q
3	1	María Reyes Sobrino	Spain	12:27.82	q, NR
4	1	Ann Peel	Canada	12:36.46	q, AR
5	2	Ileana Salvador	Italy	12:41.12	Q
6	2	Kerry Saxby	Australia	12:41.55	Q
7	2	Anikó Szebenszky	Hungary	12:45.93	q
8	1	Andrea Alföldi	Hungary	12:47.70	q
9	2	Olga Sánchez	Spain	12:50.87	q
10	2	Dana Vavřačová	Czechoslovakia	12:52.01	q
11	2	Teresa Vaill	United States	12:52.39	
12	1	Bev Hayman	Australia	13:06.61	PB
13	1	Andrea Brückmann	West Germany	13:21.72	
	2	Alison Baker	Canada	DQ	
	2	Valeria Todorova	Bulgaria	DQ	

=== Final ===
Rank	Name	Nationality	Time	Notes
1st place, gold medalist(s)	Kerry Saxby	Australia	12:01.65	WR, CR
2nd place, silver medalist(s)	Beate Anders	East Germany	12:07.73	
3rd place, bronze medalist(s)	Ileana Salvador	Italy	12:11.33	NR
4	Nadezhda Ryashkina	Soviet Union	12:12.98	PB
5	Anikó Szebenszky	Hungary	12:27.20	NR
6	Andrea Alföldi	Hungary	12:31.66	PB
7	Ann Peel	Canada	12:32.34	AR
8	Olga Sánchez	Spain	12:34.02	WJR
9	Dana Vavřačová	Czechoslovakia	12:40.51	
	María Reyes Sobrino	Spain	DQ	
