= Mariana Simeanu =

Romanian middle-distance runner (born 1964)

Medal record

Women's athletics

Representing Romania

IAAF World Indoor Games
Bronze medal – third place	1985 Paris	800 m

Mariana Simeanu (born 15 August 1964) is a Romanian middle-distance runner who competed in the 800 metres. Her sole international achievement was a bronze medal at the 1985 IAAF World Indoor Games, held in Paris. Her personal bests for the distance were 2:02.41 minutes outdoors, set in Rome on 31 August 1984 and 2:05.51 minutes indoors, set during her medal win.
