= 1985 IAAF World Indoor Games – Women's 1500 metres =

The women's 1500 metres event at the 1985 IAAF World Indoor Games was held at the Palais Omnisports Paris-Bercy on 19 January 1985. The winning margin was 0.01 seconds, which (as of July 2024) remains the narrowest in the event's history.

== Results ==
Rank	Name	Nationality	Time	Notes
1st place, gold medalist(s)	Elly van Hulst	Netherlands	4:11.41	
2nd place, silver medalist(s)	Fiţa Lovin	Romania	4:11.42	
3rd place, bronze medalist(s)	Brit McRoberts	Canada	4:11.83	
4	Natalya Artyomova	Soviet Union	4:14.11	
5	Margareta Keszeg	Romania	4:21.02	
6	Dianne Rodger	New Zealand	4:29.38	
7	Khadija Al-Matari	Jordan	5:10.87	NR
