= 1985 IAAF World Indoor Games – Women's shot put =

The women's shot put event at the 1985 IAAF World Indoor Games was held at the Palais Omnisports Paris-Bercy on 18 January.

== Results ==
Rank	Name	Nationality	#1	#2	#3	#4	#5	#6	Result	Notes
1st place, gold medalist(s)	Natalya Lisovskaya	Soviet Union	18.29	18.29	19.08	19.52	19.30	20.07	20.07	
2nd place, silver medalist(s)	Ines Müller	East Germany	19.44	19.41	x	x	19.52	19.68	19.68	
3rd place, bronze medalist(s)	Nunu Abashidze	Soviet Union	18.47	x	18.82	x	x	x	18.82	
4	Li Meisu	China	17.20	x	16.82	x	17.67	17.45	17.67	
5	Ramona Pagel	United States	16.94	16.80	16.90	16.48	17.08	17.30	17.30	
6	Simone Créantor	France	16.02	17.10	x	x	16.38	16.53	17.10	
7	Gael Martin	Australia	16.71	16.14	x	15.78	x	x	16.71	
8	Carol Cady	United States	15.40	14.73	15.44	x	15.16	15.31	15.44	
