= 1985 IAAF World Indoor Games – Women's 3000 metres =

The women's 3000 metres event at the 1985 IAAF World Indoor Games was held at the Palais Omnisports Paris-Bercy on 19 January.

== Results ==
| Rank | Name | Nationality | Time | Notes |
|---|---|---|---|---|
| 1st place, gold medalist(s) | Debbie Scott | Canada | 9:04.99 | PB |
| 2nd place, silver medalist(s) | Agnese Possamai | Italy | 9:09.66 | |
| 3rd place, bronze medalist(s) | PattiSue Plumer | United States | 9:12.12 | |
| 4 | Dianne Rodger | New Zealand | 9:12.68 | |
| 5 | El-Hassania Darami | Morocco | 9:40.45 | NR |
| 6 | Leticia Mpoghole | Tanzania | 9:55.58 | |
| 7 | Luz Fabiola Rueda | Colombia | 10:07.18 | NR |
| | Natalya Artyomova | Soviet Union | DNS | |
