= 1985 IAAF World Indoor Games – Men's shot put =

Shot put Tournament

The men's shot put event at the 1985 IAAF World Indoor Games was held at the Palais Omnisports Paris-Bercy on 19 January.

== Results ==
Rank	Name	Nationality	#1	#2	#3	#4	#5	#6	Result	Notes
1st place, gold medalist(s)	Remigius Machura	Czechoslovakia	20.46	20.42	20.34	x	21.22	x	21.22	
2nd place, silver medalist(s)	Udo Beyer	East Germany	21.10	20.75	x	x	20.22	20.27	21.10	
3rd place, bronze medalist(s)	Janis Bojars	Soviet Union	19.94	x	19.77	19.77	19.74	x	19.94	
4	Jozef Lacika	Czechoslovakia	19.75	19.45	19.11	x	19.16	19.65	19.75	
5	Helmut Krieger	Poland	18.81	19.31	19.13	19.25	19.15	19.58	19.58	
6	Marco Montelatici	Italy	18.84	19.48	18.92	x	18.78	19.04	19.48	
7	Gert Weil	Chile	19.47	x	x	19.35	x	19.41	19.47	
8	Gregg Tafralis	United States	x	18.89	18.93	x	18.83	x	18.93	
9	Eugeniusz Bałło	Poland	18.40	18.02	18.09				18.40	
10	Kari Töyrylä	Finland	17.68	17.93	17.71				17.93	
11	Ali Saad	Bahrain	14.71	x	15.02				15.02	NR
12	Abdallah Soursour	Kuwait	x	x	13.73				13.73	NR
