= Christelle Bulteau =

French sprinter

Christelle Bulteau (married name Franquelin; born 23 July 1963) is a former French track and field athlete specialising in the sprints. She has two children.

== International competitions ==
Year	Competition	Venue	Position	Event	Notes
1985	World Indoor Games	Paris-Bercy	3rd	60 m	7.34

== Personal records ==
Event	Performance	Place	Date
50 m	6.37	Saumur	2 February 1991
60 m	7.34	Paris-Bercy	19 January 1985
