= Kim Robertson (athlete) =

New Zealand sprinter

Kim Annette Robertson
Personal information
- Full name: Kim Annette Robertson
- Nationality: New Zealand
- Born: March 10, 1957 (age 69) Mt. Eden, New Zealand

Sport
- Country: New Zealand
- Sport: athletics
Medal record
Representing New Zealand
IAAF World Indoor Games
| Bronze medal – third place | 1985 Paris | 200 m |
- Updated on 16 July 2012

Kim Annette Robertson (born 10 March 1957) is a New Zealand former track and field sprinter. She represented New Zealand at three Commonwealth Games, one World Indoor Championship, three IAAF World Cup and three Pacific Conference Games. She was also selected in the 1980 Moscow Olympic team in the 400 meters but did not compete due to the NZ Government boycotting the event.

== Early life ==
Robertson was born on 10 March 1957, the middle child of Maurice Robertson and Eileen Hobcraft, in Mt Eden, a suburb of Auckland. Both her parents were athletes in their own right. Her father captained the New Zealand national rugby league team in the 1940s and 1950s and was inducted into the Legends of League (Hall of Fame equivalent) in 2000. Her mother was a sprinter, netball, and basketball player for the Auckland province. Robertson was educated at Epsom Girls' Grammar School in Auckland, Eastern Institute of Technology, Viticulture and Winemaking Dept, Napier, New Zealand.

== Sporting career ==
She joined the Hillsborough Junior Athletic Club when she was seven years old and rarely lost a sprint race from that age through to 13 years old. When she was 13 years old, competing at the Auckland Children's Championships she completed a rare feat of winning all four events she was entered in – 75 meters, 100 meters, long jump, and high jump. Her athletic career continued at Epsom Girls’ Grammar where she won the inaugural New Zealand Secondary Schools Championship senior girls sprint double in the 100m and 200m in times that were to last for over 25 years - the 100-meter record of 11.66 still stands [2]. Two weeks later she finished in 3rd place in the New Zealand senior woman's 100m & 200m to secure a place in her first New Zealand team as the youngest member (16 years old and still at high school) of the 1974 Christchurch Commonwealth Games track team. She was also selected in the 4 × 100 meter relay which came 5th in the final.

After finishing school, Robertson began training with Tom McIntyre, a sprint and hurdles coach. Robertson won 32 national titles in the 100m, 200m, and 400m New Zealand Championship events between 1976 and 1984. McIntyre suggested that Robertson compete in the 400m, which she first contested at the New Zealand Track & Field Championships in Hamilton in March 1977. McIntyre, who was 95 years old at the time, presented Robertson with the gold medal for the 400m.

The move up to the 400m distance resulted in her 1st of six 400m titles, immediately breaking the Auckland record. Her times steadily improved until in 1980 she ran a world-class time (and new New Zealand Record [5]) of 51.60 in the televised New Zealand Track Series beating the current Commonwealth Games champion Donna Hartley from England. This time ranked Robertson 12th in the world and beat the Olympic Games qualifying time. She repeated this accomplishment one week later in her home city of Auckland running down the opposition in the final 150 meters to win in 51.80. Robertson's time of 51.60 still stands as a New Zealand record – the longest-standing Olympic track event record for women.

Unfortunately for Robertson the 1980 New Zealand Olympic team boycotted the Moscow Games and therefore she could not compete. She continued to compete in all sprint events and was 5th in the 1982 Commonwealth Games 400m behind the great Raelene Boyle. In 1985 Robertson was selected to compete in the first ever World Indoor Games in Paris, France. She was selected for both the 60m and 200m. Having never run on an indoor track before Robertson made both finals and won a bronze medal behind world record holder Marita Koch in the 200m [6]. Koch's winning time was 23.09 c.f. Robertson's 3rd place in 23.69. Robertson's times from that championship are still the fastest indoor times run by a New Zealand woman.

In the winter months, Robertson excelled in badminton representing Auckland at numerous tournaments and winning the Auckland A Grade singles and doubles in 1978.

== Coaching career ==
After retiring from competitive athletics Robertson moved to the small South Island city of Nelson and coached a number of young sprinters and jumpers. Brent Stebbings won the NZ Secondary Schools triple jump title 3 years running using the Robertson innovative style of sprint/jump training. Robertson also coached hockey, basketball, and soccer players, marathon runners, and Special Olympic athletes for over 20 years. Now living in California, US, she continues her interest in coaching speed work for track and soccer.

== Honours ==
New Zealand Athlete of the Year – 1980

North Shore Athlete of the Year - 1985

Epsom Girls Grammar School Track Captain – 1973–1975

== Personal bests ==
=== Outdoor ===
| Event | Time | Date | Place |
|---|---|---|---|
| 100m | 11.62 | March 1978 | Wellington, New Zealand |
| 200m | 23.13 | 15/07/1978 | Mt. Sac Relays, California, US |
| 400m | 51.60 | 19/01/1980 | Christchurch, New Zealand |
| 800m | 2:5.4 | February 1985 | Auckland, New Zealand |

=== Indoor ===
| Event | Time | Date | Place |
|---|---|---|---|
| 60m | 7.43 | 19/01/1985 | Paris, France |
| 200m | 23.69 | 19/01/1985 | Paris, France |
| 400m | 55.32 | 15/01/1986 | Osaka, Japan |

== International competitions ==
IAAF World Indoor Games

- 1985 Paris, France 60m 6th (Final)
- 200m 3rd Bronze (Final)

Commonwealth Games

- 1974 Christchurch, New Zealand 100m 4th (Heat), 200m 5th (Heat) 4 × 100 m 5th (Final)
- 1978 Edmonton, Canada 100m 5th (SemiFinal) 200m 6th (semi final) 4 × 100 m 4th (Final)
- 1982 Brisbane, Australia 400m 5th Final 4 × 400 m 6th (Final)

Australian Athletics Championships

- 1984 Melbourne 400m Gold

New Zealand Athletics Championships

- 1976 Auckland 100m Silver - 200m Gold
- 1977 Hamilton 100m Gold - 200m Gold - 400m Gold
- 1978 Wellington 100m Gold-200m Gold
- 1979 Christchurch 100m Gold-200m Gold-400m Gold
- 1980 Auckland 100m Gold-200m Gold-400m Gold
- 1982 Hamilton 100m Gold-200m Gold-400m Gold
- 1983 Christchurch 100m Gold-200m Gold-400m Gold
- 1984 Auckland 200m Gold-400m Gold

Auckland Badminton Championships

- 1978 A Grade Singles and Doubles champion
