= 1993 IAAF World Indoor Championships – Women's 3000 metres walk =

The women's 3000 metres walk event at the 1993 IAAF World Indoor Championships was held on 12 and 13 March.

== Medalists ==
| Gold | Silver | Bronze |
|---|---|---|
| Yelena Nikolayeva; Russia | Kerry Saxby-Junna; Australia | Ileana Salvador; Italy |

== Results ==
=== Heats ===
First 4 of each heat (Q) and next 2 fastest (q) qualified for the final.

| Rank | Heat | Name | Nationality | Time | Notes |
|---|---|---|---|---|---|
| 1 | 2 | Yelena Nikolayeva | Russia | 12:15.43 | Q |
| 2 | 2 | Kerry Saxby-Junna | Australia | 12:16.90 | Q |
| 3 | 1 | Ileana Salvador | Italy | 12:20.24 | Q |
| 4 | 1 | Yelena Arshintseva | Russia | 12:20.42 | Q |
| 5 | 1 | Debbi Lawrence | United States | 12:20.79 | Q, AR |
| 6 | 1 | Madelein Svensson | Sweden | 12:21.53 | Q |
| 7 | 2 | Beate Anders | Germany | 12:22.57 | Q |
| 8 | 2 | Annarita Sidoti | Italy | 12:26.12 | Q |
| 9 | 2 | Sari Essayah | Finland | 12:27.38 | q, NR |
| 10 | 1 | Sada Bukšnienė | Lithuania | 12:30.56 | q |
| 11 | 1 | Alison Baker | Canada | 12:33.62 | |
| 12 | 2 | Janice McCaffrey | Canada | 12:56.71 | |
| 13 | 1 | Simone Thust | Germany | 13:06.06 | |
| 14 | 2 | Victoria Herazo | United States | 13:08.74 | |
| 15 | 2 | Julie Drake | Great Britain | 13:12.01 | NR |
| 16 | 2 | Hilde Gustavsen | Norway | 13:20.95 | |
| 17 | 1 | Zuzana Zemková | Slovakia | 13:43.89 | |

=== Final ===
| Rank | Name | Nationality | Time | Notes |
|---|---|---|---|---|
| 1st place, gold medalist(s) | Yelena Nikolayeva | Russia | 11:49.73 | CR |
| 2nd place, silver medalist(s) | Kerry Saxby-Junna | Australia | 11:53.82 | AR |
| 3rd place, bronze medalist(s) | Ileana Salvador | Italy | 11:55.35 | |
| 4 | Beate Anders | Germany | 11:57.14 | |
| 5 | Yelena Arshintseva | Russia | 12:01.22 | |
| 6 | Annarita Sidoti | Italy | 12:04.16 | |
| 7 | Sari Essayah | Finland | 12:06.10 | NR |
| 8 | Madelein Svensson | Sweden | 12:18.10 | |
| 9 | Sada Bukšnienė | Lithuania | 12:40.18 | |
| | Debbi Lawrence | United States | DQ | |
