= Andrea Alföldi =

Hungarian race walker (born 1964)

Personal information
- Born: September 22, 1964 (age 61) Komló, Baranya, Hungary

Sport
- Sport: Race walking

Andrea Alföldi Rejtő (born September 22, 1964) is a retired female race walker from Hungary, who competed for her native country at the 1992 Summer Olympics in Barcelona, Spain. She set her personal best (43.41) in the women's 10 km event in 1992.

== Achievements ==
Year	Competition	Venue	Position	Event	Notes
Representing Hungary
1989	World Indoor Championships	Budapest, Hungary	6th	3000 m	12:31.66
1989	World Race Walking Cup	L'Hospitalet, Spain	22nd	10 km	46:43
1991	World Race Walking Cup	San Jose, United States	11th	10 km	45:42
1991	Universiade	Sheffield, United Kingdom	8th	10 km	46:41
1991	World Championships	Tokyo, Japan	14th	10 km	45:22
1992	Olympic Games	Barcelona, Spain	18th	10 km	46:35
1993	World Race Walking Cup	Monterrey, Mexico	19th	10 km	47:59
1993	World Championships	Stuttgart, Germany	14th	10 km	45:57
1995	World Race Walking Cup	Beijing, PR China	61st	10 km	48:20
