= 1985 IAAF World Indoor Games – Men's 1500 metres =

The men's 1500 metres event at the 1985 IAAF World Indoor Games was held at the Palais Omnisports Paris-Bercy on 18 and 19 January.

== Medalists ==
Gold	Silver	Bronze
Michael Hillardt; Australia	José Luis Gonzalez; Spain	Joseph Chesire; Kenya

== Results ==
=== Heats ===
First 4 of each heat qualified directly (Q) for the final.

Rank	Heat	Name	Nationality	Time	Notes
1	1	Joseph Chesire	Kenya	3:43.16	Q
2	2	Michael Hillardt	Australia	3:43.62	Q
3	2	Riccardo Materazzi	Italy	3:43.87	Q
4	1	José Luis Gonzalez	Spain	3:43.94	Q
5	2	Andrés Vera	Spain	3:44.31	Q
6	2	José Marajo	France	3:44.46	Q
7	1	Mirosław Żerkowski	Poland	3:44.52	Q
8	1	Alberto Corvo	Italy	3:45.05	Q
9	1	Clifton Bradeley	Great Britain	3:45.90	
10	1	Michel Wijnsberghe	Belgium	3:46.93	
11	1	Omer Khalifa	Sudan	3:48.41	
12	2	Enda Fitzpatrick	Ireland	3:48.95	
13	2	Costel Ene	Romania	3:53.56	
14	2	Angel Concepción	Puerto Rico	4:06.54	

=== Final ===
Rank	Name	Nationality	Time	Notes
1st place, gold medalist(s)	Michael Hillardt	Australia	3:40.27	
2nd place, silver medalist(s)	José Luis Gonzalez	Spain	3:41.36	
3rd place, bronze medalist(s)	Joseph Chesire	Kenya	3:41.38	PB
4	Mirosław Żerkowski	Poland	3:42.21	
5	Riccardo Materazzi	Italy	3:43.56	
6	Alberto Corvo	Italy	3:45.46	
7	José Marajo	France	3:47.53	
8	Andrés Vera	Spain	3:52.89	
