= Giuliana Salce =

Italian race walker (born 1955)

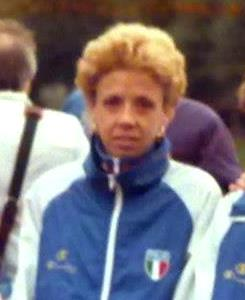

Personal information
- National team: Italy
- Born: 16 June 1955 (age 71) Rome, Italy

Sport
- Sport: Athletics
- Event: Racewalking
- Club: CUS Roma

Achievements and titles
- Personal bests: 5 km walk: 21:35:25 (1986); 3 km walk indoor: 12:31:57 (1985)
Medal record
World Indoor Championships
| Gold medal – first place | 1985 Paris | 3 km race walk |
| Silver medal – second place | 1987 Paris | 3 km race walk |
European Indoor Championships
| Silver medal – second place | 1987 Athens | 3 km race walk |

Giuliana Salce (born 16 June 1955 in Rome) is a retired female race walker from Italy. Her greatest achievement was the 1985 World Indoor gold medal.

In her career she set three world records in the beginning of the women's racewalking.

== Biography ==
She won three medal, at senior level, at the International athletics competitions. She has 17 caps in national team from 1979 to 1987.

After her career in athletics, she tried to go cycling master, but after some time has been involved in an ugly story of doping, after the inevitable disqualification is taken the complaint to the person who was involved and the publication of a book, Dalla vita inn giù, 2011.

== World record ==
Outdoor

- 5 km walk: 21:51:85 ( (Italy) L'Aquila, 1 October 1983)
- 5 km walk: 21:35:25 ( (Italy) Verona, 19 June 1986)

Indoor

- 3 km walk: 12:31:57 ( (Italy) Florence, 6 February 1985)

== Achievements ==
| Year | Competition | Venue | Position | Event | Notes |
|---|---|---|---|---|---|
| 1983 | World Race Walking Cup | Bergen, Norway | 18th | 10 km | |
| 1985 | World Indoor Championships | Paris, France | 1st | 3 km | |
| 1987 | European Indoor Championships | Athens, Greece | 2nd | 3 km | |
| 1987 | World Indoor Championships | Paris, France | 2nd | 3 km | |
| 1987 | World Championships | Rome, Italy | 18th | 10 km | |

== National titles ==
Salce won 12 national championships at individual senior level.

- Italian Athletics Championships
  - 5000 m walk (track): 1982, 1983, 1984, 1987 (4)
  - 10 km walk: 1984 (1)
- Italian Indoor Athletics Championships
  - 3000 m walk: 1981, 1982, 1983, 1984, 1985, 1986, 1987 (7)
