= 1985 IAAF World Indoor Games =

IAAF World Indoor Games
- Dates: 18–19 January
- Host city: Paris, France
- Venue: Palais Omnisports Paris-Bercy
- Events: 24
- Participation: 319 athletes from 69 nations

The World Indoor Games were arranged by the IAAF and held at the Palais Omnisports Paris-Bercy in Paris, France, from January 18 to January 19, 1985. In 1987 the championship was renamed to the IAAF World Indoor Championships and gained official status. There were a total number of 319 participating athletes from 69 countries.

== Results ==
=== Men ===
Event	Gold		Silver		Bronze	
60 metres	Ben Johnson; Canada	6.62	Sam Graddy; United States	6.63	Ronald Desruelles; Belgium	6.68
200 metres	Aleksandr Yevgenyev; Soviet Union	20.95	Ade Mafe; Great Britain	20.96	João Batista da Silva; Brazil	21.19
400 metres	Thomas Schönlebe; East Germany	45.60	Todd Bennett; Great Britain	45.97	Mark Rowe; United States	46.31
800 metres	Colomán Trabado; Spain	1:47.42	Benjamín González; Spain	1:47.94	Ikem Billy; Great Britain	1:48.28
1500 metres	Michael Hillardt; Australia	3:40.27	José Luis González; Spain	3:41.36	Joseph Chesire; Kenya	3:41.38
3000 metres	João Campos; Portugal	7:57.63	Don Clary; United States	7:57.78	Ivan Uvizl; Czechoslovakia	7:57.92
60 metres hurdles	Stéphane Caristan; France	7.67	Javier Moracho; Spain	7.69	Jon Ridgeon; Great Britain	7.70
5000 metres walk	Gérard Lelièvre; France	19:06.22	Maurizio Damilano; Italy	19:11.41	Dave Smith; Australia	19:16.04
High jump	Patrik Sjöberg; Sweden	2.32	Javier Sotomayor; Cuba	2.30	Othmane Belfaa; Algeria	2.27; NR
Pole vault	Sergey Bubka; Soviet Union	5.75	Thierry Vigneron; France	5.70	Vasiliy Bubka; Soviet Union	5.60
Long jump	Jan Leitner; Czechoslovakia	7.96	Gyula Pálóczi; Hungary	7.94	Giovanni Evangelisti; Italy	7.88
Triple jump	Khristo Markov; Bulgaria	17.22	Lázaro Betancourt; Cuba	17.15	Lázaro Balcindes; Cuba	16.83
Shot put	Remigius Machura; Czechoslovakia	21.22	Udo Beyer; East Germany	21.10	Jānis Bojārs; Soviet Union	19.94

=== Women ===
Event	Gold		Silver		Bronze	
60 metres	Silke Gladisch; East Germany	7.20	Heather Oakes; Great Britain	7.21	Christelle Bulteau; France	7.34
200 metres	Marita Koch; East Germany	23.09	Marie-Christine Cazier; France	23.33	Kim Robertson; New Zealand	23.69 (NR)
400 metres	Diane Dixon; United States	53.35	Regine Berg; Belgium	53.81	Charmaine Crooks; Canada	54.08
800 metres	Cristieana Cojocaru; Romania	2:04.22	Jane Finch; Great Britain	2:04.71	Mariana Simeanu; Romania	2:05.51
1500 metres	Elly van Hulst; Netherlands	4:11.41	Fiţa Lovin; Romania	4:11.42	Brit McRoberts; Canada	4:11.83
3000 metres	Debbie Scott; Canada	9:04.99	Agnese Possamai; Italy	9:09.66	PattiSue Plumer; United States	9:12.12
60 metres hurdles	Xénia Siska; Hungary	8.03	Laurence Elloy; France	8.08	Anne Piquereau; France	8.10
3000 metres walk	Giuliana Salce; Italy	12:53.42	Yan Hong; China	13:06.66	Ann Peel; Canada	13:06.97
High jump	Stefka Kostadinova; Bulgaria	1.97	Susanne Lorentzon; Sweden	1.94	Debbie Brill; Canada	1.90
High jump	Stefka Kostadinova; Bulgaria	1.97	Susanne Lorentzon; Sweden	1.94	Danuta Bułkowska; Poland	1.90
High jump	Stefka Kostadinova; Bulgaria	1.97	Susanne Lorentzon; Sweden	1.94	Silvia Costa; Cuba	1.90
Long jump	Helga Radtke; East Germany	6.88	Tatyana Rodionova; Soviet Union	6.72	Nijolė Medvedeva; Soviet Union	6.44
Shot put	Natalya Lisovskaya; Soviet Union	20.07	Ines Müller; East Germany	19.68	Nunu Abashidze; Soviet Union	18.82

== Medals table ==
Rank	Nation	Gold	Silver	Bronze	Total
1	East Germany (GDR)	4	2	0	6
2	Soviet Union (URS)	3	1	4	8
3	France (FRA)	2	3	2	7
4	Canada (CAN)	2	0	4	6
5	Czechoslovakia (TCH)	2	0	1	3
6	Bulgaria (BUL)	2	0	0	2
7	Spain (ESP)	1	3	0	4
8	United States (USA)	1	2	2	5
9	Italy (ITA)	1	2	1	4
10	Romania (ROU)	1	1	1	3
11	Hungary (HUN)	1	1	0	2
11	Sweden (SWE)	1	1	0	2
13	Australia (AUS)	1	0	1	2
14	Netherlands (NED)	1	0	0	1
14	Portugal (POR)	1	0	0	1
16	Great Britain (GBR)	0	4	2	6
17	Cuba (CUB)	0	2	2	4
18	Belgium (BEL)	0	1	1	2
19	China (CHN)	0	1	0	1
20	Algeria (ALG)	0	0	1	1
20	Brazil (BRA)	0	0	1	1
20	Kenya (KEN)	0	0	1	1
20	New Zealand (NZL)	0	0	1	1
20	Poland (POL)	0	0	1	1
Totals (24 entries)		24	24	26	74

== Participating nations ==
- Algeria (1)
- Argentina (2)
- Australia (6)
- Austria (2)
- Bahamas (2)
- Bahrain (2)
- Barbados (1)
- Belgium (7)
- Brazil (5)
- Bulgaria (6)
- Canada (10)
- Chile (2)
- China (9)
- Chinese Taipei (2)
- Colombia (2)
- Cuba (8)
- Czechoslovakia (10)
- Denmark (3)
- Dominican Republic (2)
- East Germany (6)
- Egypt (2)
- Finland (3)
- France (25)
- Great Britain (16)
- Greece (3)
- Hong Kong (2)
- Hungary (4)
- Iceland (2)
- India (2)
- Indonesia (2)
- Ireland (2)
- Israel (1)
- Italy (19)
- Ivory Coast (2)
- Jamaica (1)
- Japan (5)
- Jordan (1)
- Kenya (1)
- Kuwait (5)
- Lebanon (2)
- Morocco (5)
- Mexico (4)
- Netherlands (4)
- New Zealand (5)
- Norway (7)
- Palestine (1)
- Peru (2)
- Philippines (2)
- Poland (8)
- Portugal (2)
- Puerto Rico (2)
- Qatar (2)
- Romania (7)
- Senegal (3)
- South Korea (2)
- South Yemen (2)
- Soviet Union (16)
- Spain (9)
- Sudan (2)
- Sweden (4)
- Switzerland (7)
- Syria (2)
- Tanzania (2)
- Trinidad and Tobago (2)
- Turkey (1)
- Uganda (1)
- United States (22)
- West Germany (5)
- Yugoslavia (1)

== See also ==
- 1985 in athletics (track and field)
