= Lists of deaths by year =

This is a list of lists of deaths of notable people, organized by year. New deaths articles are added to their respective month (e.g., Deaths in October 2026) and then linked below.

== 2026 ==
- January
- February
- March
- April
- May
- June
- July
- August
- September
- October
- November

== 2025 ==
- January
- February
- March
- April
- May
- June
- July
- August
- September
- October
- November
- December

== 2024 ==
- January
- February
- March
- April
- May
- June
- July
- August
- September
- October
- November
- December

== 2023 ==
- January
- February
- March
- April
- May
- June
- July
- August
- September
- October
- November
- December

== 2022 ==
- January
- February
- March
- April
- May
- June
- July
- August
- September
- October
- November
- December

== 2021 ==
- January
- February
- March
- April
- May
- June
- July
- August
- September
- October
- November
- December

== 2020 ==
- January
- February
- March
- April
- May
- June
- July
- August
- September
- October
- November
- December

== 2019 ==
- January
- February
- March
- April
- May
- June
- July
- August
- September
- October
- November
- December

== 2018 ==
- January
- February
- March
- April
- May
- June
- July
- August
- September
- October
- November
- December

== 2017 ==
- January
- February
- March
- April
- May
- June
- July
- August
- September
- October
- November
- December

== 2016 ==
- January
- February
- March
- April
- May
- June
- July
- August
- September
- October
- November
- December

== 2015 ==
- January
- February
- March
- April
- May
- June
- July
- August
- September
- October
- November
- December

== 2014 ==
- January
- February
- March
- April
- May
- June
- July
- August
- September
- October
- November
- December

== 2013 ==
- January
- February
- March
- April
- May
- June
- July
- August
- September
- October
- November
- December

== 2012 ==
- January
- February
- March
- April
- May
- June
- July
- August
- September
- October
- November
- December

== 2011 ==
- January
- February
- March
- April
- May
- June
- July
- August
- September
- October
- November
- December

== 2010 ==
- January
- February
- March
- April
- May
- June
- July
- August
- September
- October
- November
- December

== 2009 ==
- January
- February
- March
- April
- May
- June
- July
- August
- September
- October
- November
- December

== 2008 ==
- January
- February
- March
- April
- May
- June
- July
- August
- September
- October
- November
- December

== 2007 ==
- January
- February
- March
- April
- May
- June
- July
- August
- September
- October
- November
- December

== 2006 ==
- January
- February
- March
- April
- May
- June
- July
- August
- September
- October
- November
- December

== 2005 ==
- January
- February
- March
- April
- May
- June
- July
- August
- September
- October
- November
- December

== 2004 ==
- January
- February
- March
- April
- May
- June
- July
- August
- September
- October
- November
- December

== 2003 ==
- January
- February
- March
- April
- May
- June
- July
- August
- September
- October
- November
- December

== 2002 ==
- January
- February
- March
- April
- May
- June
- July
- August
- September
- October
- November
- December

== 2001 ==
- January
- February
- March
- April
- May
- June
- July
- August
- September
- October
- November
- December

== 2000 ==
- January
- February
- March
- April
- May
- June
- July
- August
- September
- October
- November
- December

== 1999 ==
- January
- February
- March
- April
- May
- June
- July
- August
- September
- October
- November
- December

== 1998 ==
- January
- February
- March
- April
- May
- June
- July
- August
- September
- October
- November
- December

== 1997 ==
- January
- February
- March
- April
- May
- June
- July
- August
- September
- October
- November
- December

== 1996 ==
- January
- February
- March
- April
- May
- June
- July
- August
- September
- October
- November
- December

== 1995 ==
- January
- February
- March
- April
- May
- June
- July
- August
- September
- October
- November
- December

== 1994 ==
- January
- February
- March
- April
- May
- June
- July
- August
- September
- October
- November
- December

== 1993 ==
- January
- February
- March
- April
- May
- June
- July
- August
- September
- October
- November
- December

== 1992 ==
- January
- February
- March
- April
- May
- June
- July
- August
- September
- October
- November
- December

== 1991 ==
- January
- February
- March
- April
- May
- June
- July
- August
- September
- October
- November
- December

== 1990 ==
- January
- February
- March
- April
- May
- June
- July
- August
- September
- October
- November
- December

== 1989 ==
- January
- February
- March
- April
- May
- June
- July
- August
- September
- October
- November
- December

== 1988 ==
- January
- February
- March
- April
- May
- June
- July
- August
- September
- October
- November
- December

== 1987 ==
- January
- February
- March
- April
- May
- June
- July
- August
- September
- October
- November
- December

== 1986 ==
- January
- February
- March
- April
- May
- June
- July
- August
- September
- October
- November
- December

== 1985 ==
- January
- February
- March
- April
- May
- June
- July
- August
- September
- October
- November
- December

== 1984 ==
- January
- February
- March
- April
- May
- June
- July
- August
- September
- October
- November
- December

== 1983 ==
- January
- February
- March
- April
- May
- June
- July
- August
- September
- October
- November
- December

== 1982 ==
- January
- February
- March
- April
- May
- June
- July
- August
- September
- October
- November
- December

== 1981 ==
- January
- February
- March
- April
- May
- June
- July
- August
- September
- October
- November
- December

== 1980 ==
- January
- February
- March
- April
- May
- June
- July
- August
- September
- October
- November
- December

== 1979 ==
- January
- February
- March
- April
- May
- June
- July
- August
- September
- October
- November
- December

== 1978 ==
- January
- February
- March
- April
- May
- June
- July
- August
- September
- October
- November
- December

== 1977 ==
- January
- February
- March
- April
- May
- June
- July
- August
- September
- October
- November
- December

== Earlier years ==
Deaths in years earlier than this can usually be found in the main articles of the years.

== See also ==
- List of days of the year
- Lists of births by year
- Deaths by year (category)
