= Deaths in June 1984 =

The following is a list of notable deaths in June 1984.

Entries for each day are listed alphabetically by surname. A typical entry lists information in the following sequence:

- Name, age, country of citizenship at birth, subsequent country of citizenship (if applicable), reason for notability, cause of death (if known), and reference.

== June 1984 ==
=== 1 ===
- Violet La Plante, 76, American silent film actress, she was selected as a WAMPAS Baby Star in 1925
- Nana Palshikar, 76, Indian actor

=== 2 ===
- François de Menthon, 84, French politician and professor of law

=== 3 ===
- Aldo Campatelli, 65, Italian football manager and player
- Peter Wilson, 71, English auctioneer and chairman of Sotheby's

=== 4 ===
- Zbigniew Sawan, 80, Polish actor

=== 5 ===
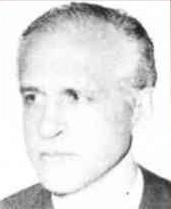
Ahmad Fuad Mohieddin

- Edward Virgil Abner, 59, American tenor and psychologist
- Ahmad Fuad Mohieddin, 58, 42nd Prime Minister of Egypt

=== 6 ===
- Jarnail Singh Bhindranwale, 37, Sikh religious leader and militant

=== 7 ===
- Ethel Gee, 70, Englishwoman who was a spy for the Soviet Union
- George Givot, 81, Russian-born American comedian & actor (Lady and the Tramp, Ain't Misbehavin, The Chief), heart attack.

=== 8 ===
- Musa Alami, Palestinian nationalist politician (b. 1897)

=== 9 ===
- Eric Persson, 86, chairman of the Swedish football club Malmö FF
- Adolf Wagner, 72, German weightlifter and Olympic medalist

=== 10 ===
- Marion Gilmore, 75, muralist and painter

=== 11 ===
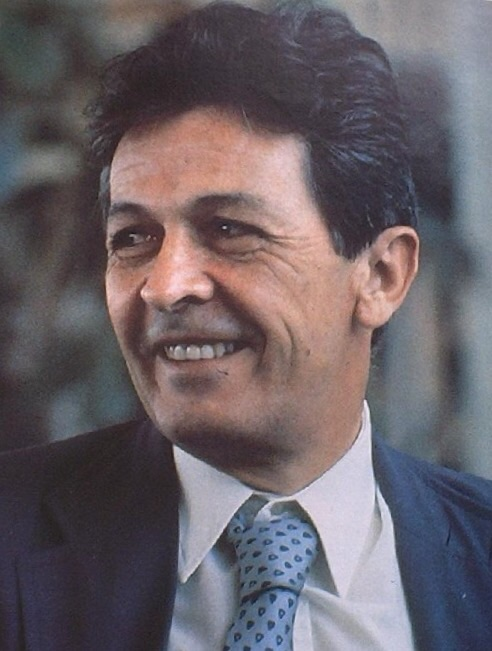
Enrico Berlinguer

- Enrico Berlinguer, 62, General Secretary of the Italian Communist Party, brain hemorrhage

=== 12 ===
- Michael Christiansen, 57, British newspaper editor
- János Ferencsik, 77, Hungarian conductor
- Kiril Simonovski, 68, Bulgarian Yugoslav footballer

=== 13 ===
- Ynso Scholten, 66, Dutch politician

=== 14 ===
- Noël Hutton, 76, British parliamentary draftsman

=== 15 ===
- Ned Glass, 78, Polish-born American actor
- Meredith Willson, 82, American composer, flutist, and comedian

=== 16 ===
- John Agar-Hamilton, South African historian and Anglican priest (b. 1895)
- Sir John Randall, English physicist (b. 1905)

=== 17 ===
- Milbourne Christopher, 70, American illusionist, magic historian, and author
- Nobuo Nakagawa, 79, a Japanese film director

=== 18 ===
- Alan Berg, 50, American talk radio show host, assassinated

=== 19 ===
- Lee Krasner, 75, American painter

=== 20 ===
- Estelle Winwood, 101, English actress

=== 21 ===
- Joseph Campbell, 84, fourth Comptroller General of the United States

=== 22 ===
- Joseph Losey, 75, American film director

=== 23 ===
- Carl Duane, 81, American boxer

=== 24 ===
- William Keighley, 94, American film director, stroke

=== 25 ===
- Michel Foucault, 57, French philosopher, AIDS

=== 26 ===
- Carl Foreman, 70, American screenwriter

=== 27 ===
- Oswald Jacoby, 81, American contract bridge player and author

=== 28 ===
- Yigael Yadin, 67, Israeli archeologist, politician and Military Chief of Staff
- Claude Chevalley, 75, French mathematician

=== 29 ===
- Jimmie Daniels, 76, American cabaret performer, actor, model, and nightclub owner

=== 30 ===
- Henri Fabre, 101, French aviator & inventor
- Lillian Hellman, 79, American playwright

== Sources ==
- Liebman, Roy (2000). The Wampas Baby Stars: A Biographical Dictionary, 1922–1934. Jefferson, North Carolina: McFarland. ISBN 0-7864-0756-5.
