= Deaths in November 1981 =

The following is a list of notable deaths in November 1981.

Entries for each day are listed alphabetically by surname. A typical entry lists information in the following sequence:

- Name, age, country of citizenship at birth, subsequent country of citizenship (if applicable), reason for notability, cause of death (if known), and reference.

== November 1981 ==
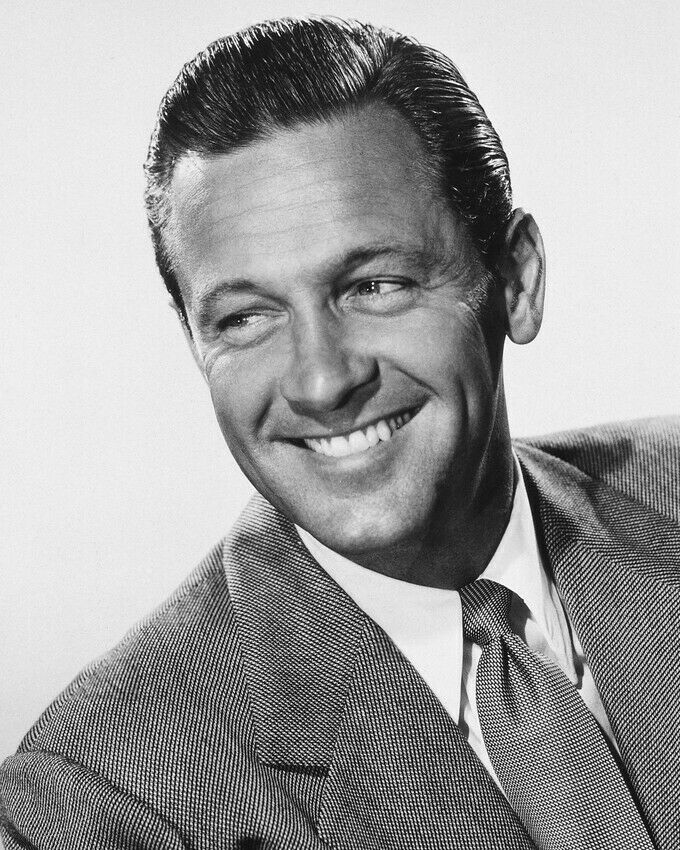
William Holden

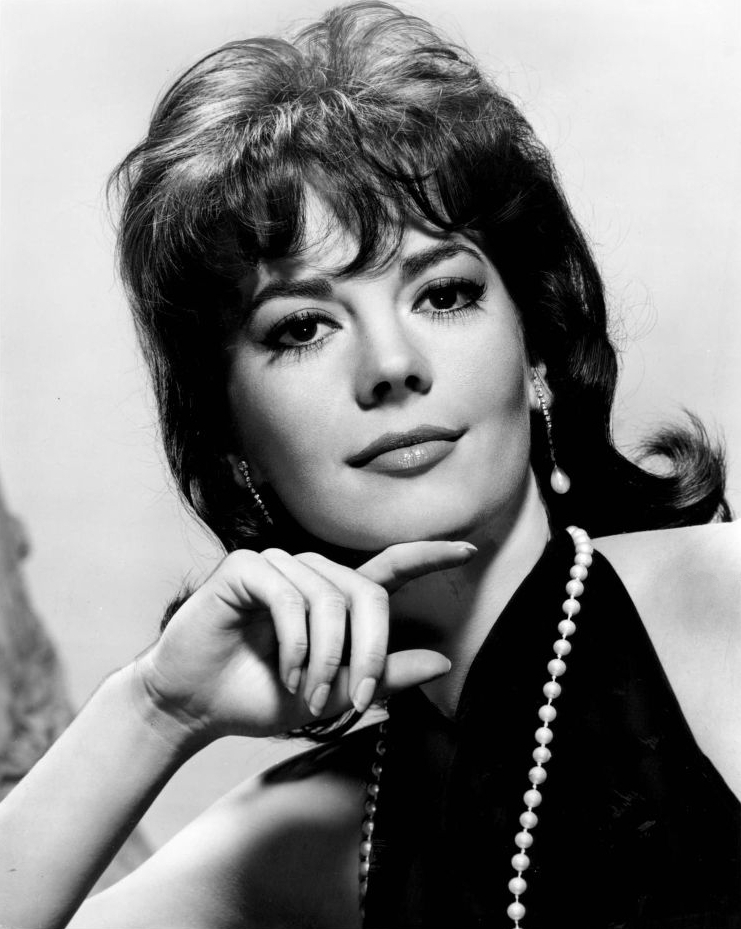
Natalie Wood

=== 2 ===
- Wally Wood, 54, American comic book writer, artist and independent publisher, his better known works include stories for EC Comics's titles such as Weird Science, Weird Fantasy, and MAD Magazine from its inception in 1952 until 1964, for the T.H.U.N.D.E.R. Agents, for Warren Publishing's Creepy, for the early issues of Marvel's Daredevil (where he established the title character's distinctive red costume), and for his own creator-owned characters Sally Forth and Cannon, suicide by gunshot, due to facing declining health and career prospects.

=== 3 ===
- Thérèse Casgrain, 85, French-Canadian feminist, reformer, politician and senator, she was a leader in the fight for the women's right to vote in the province of Quebec, she was also the first woman to lead a political party in Canada, in the 1960s, she became a campaigner against nuclear weapons, she founded in February 1961 the Quebec wing of the Voice of Women (VOW) and served as the national president of VOW from 1962 until 1963.

=== 5 ===
- Jean Eustache, 42, French film director and editor, his debut feature film The Mother and the Whore (1973) is considered a key work of the post-Nouvelle Vague French cinema,suicide by gunshot, after being partially immobilized in a car accident

=== 6 ===
- Frank Harvey, 69, English screenwriter and playwright

=== 10 ===
- Abel Gance, 92, French film director, producer, writer, and actor, he began directing his own films in 1911 with La Digue (ou Pour sauver la Hollande), Gance's innovations in the cinematic techniques included his multiscreen ventures with Polyvision, the superimposition of images, extreme close-ups, fast rhythmic editing, and unorthodox uses for mobile cameras (hand-held, mounted on wires or a pendulum, or strapped to a horse),tuberculosis

=== 12 ===
- William Holden, 63, American actor, he was nominated for the Academy Award for Best Actor for his role in the dark comedy Sunset Boulevard (1950), and he won the same award for his role in the war film Stalag 17 (1953), he bled to death in his apartment after lacerating his forehead by slipping on a rug while intoxicated and hitting a bedside table. The forensic evidence recovered at the scene suggested that Holden was conscious for at least half an hour after the fall. His body was found four days later.

=== 13 ===
- Gerhard Marcks, 92, German sculptor and potter, he was one of the first three faculty members hired by the Bauhaus in 1919, in the post-World War II era, his work was part of the art competitions at three Olympic Games.

=== 15 ===
- Walter Heitler, 77, German–Irish theoretical physicist, he co-published a paper on pair production of gamma rays in the Coulomb field of an atomic nucleus, developing the Bethe–Heitler formula for Bremsstrahlung (braking radiation), he also contributed to the understanding of cosmic rays, and he predicted the existence of the electrically neutral pi meson.
- Enid Markey, 87, American actress, she was the first actress to portray the literary character of Jane Porter in film, playing the character in both Tarzan of The Apes (1918) and The Romance of Tarzan (1918), complications from a heart attack which she had experienced on November 13

=== 18 ===
- Fredric Wertham, 86, German–American psychiatrist and author, he served as a professor of psychiatry at New York University, a senior psychiatrist in the New York City Department of Hospitals, and as both a psychiatrist and the director of the Mental Hygiene Clinic at the Bellevue Hospital Center, his best-known book is Seduction of the Innocent (1954), which asserted that comic books caused youth to become juvenile delinquents, many of Wertham's other conjectures, particularly about hidden sexual themes (e.g. images of female nudity concealed in drawings of muscles and tree bark, or Batman and Robin as gay lovers), were met with skepticism from his fellow mental health professionals, but found an audience in those concerned with "public morals", such as Senator Estes Kefauver, who had Wertham testify before the Senate Subcommittee on Juvenile Delinquency, which he led

=== 21 ===
- Harry von Zell, 75, American radio announcer and actor, CBS staff announcer and announcer of The Aldrich Family, during the 1920s and 1930s, von Zell served as the announcer on some 20 shows per week, he also worked in the early days of television, in 1931 describing boxing matches on experimental television boxing broadcasts,cancer

=== 22 ===
- Jack Fingleton, 73, Australian Test cricketer, journalist and commentator, he scored five Test match centuries, representing Australia in 18 Tests between 1932 and 1938.
- Hans Krebs, 81, German-British biologist, physician, and biochemist, in 1932, Krebs worked out the outlines of the urea cycle with a medical student, and they published their discovery within the same year. The urea cycle was the first metabolic cycle to be discovered.

=== 25 ===
- Jack Albertson, 74, American actor, comedian, dancer, singer, and vaudevillian, he won an Academy Award for Best Supporting Actor for his role in The Subject Was Roses (1968),colon cancer
- Morris Kirksey, 86, American track and field athlete and rugby union footballer who won two gold medals at the 1920 Summer Olympics

=== 26 ===
- Max Euwe, 80, Dutch chess player, mathematician, author, and chess administrator, he became the world amateur chess champion in 1928 with a score of 12/15, he served as was president of the Fédération Internationale des Échecs (FIDE) from 1970 until 1978.

=== 27 ===
- Lotte Lenya, 83, Austrian-American singer, diseuse, and actress, she was nominated for the Academy Award for Best Supporting Actress for her role in the romantic drama The Roman Spring of Mrs. Stone (1961), she portrayed the antagonist Rosa Klebb in the spy film From Russia with Love (1963), and her film character was described as one "the most dangerous female villains of the decade",cancer

=== 28 ===
- Bill Stalker, 33, New Zealand actor, he portrayed the popular character Peter Fanelli, the head of airport security, in both the airport drama serial Skyways and the police procedural Cop Shop, killed in a road accident taking place in wet weather, when his motorcycle slid and collided with a car

=== 29 ===
- Natalie Wood, 43, American actress, she began acting at age four and co-starred at age eight in Miracle on 34th Street (1947), critics have suggested that her cinematic career represents a portrait of modern American womanhood in transition, as she was one of the few actresses to take both child roles and those of middle-aged characters, death due to accidental drowning and hypothermia. Wood was on a weekend boat trip to Santa Catalina Island on board Splendour, a 58-foot (18 m) motor yacht owned by her husband, the local authorities recovered her body from the water, one mile (1.6 km) from the boat, with a small Valiant-brand inflatable dinghy beached nearby.

=== 30 ===
- Robert H. Harris, American character actor, he played Jake Goldberg in the television version of The Goldbergs from 1953 until 1956, serving as a replacement for Philip Loeb and Harold Stone

== Sources ==
- Noguchi, Thomas T.; DiMona, Joseph (1983). Coroner. New York: Simon & Schuster. ISBN 0-671-46772-7.
- Rulli, Marti; Davern, Dennis (2009). Goodbye Natalie, Goodbye Splendour. Medallion. ISBN 978-1-59777-639-4.
