= Deaths in May 1984 =

The following is a list of notable deaths in May 1984.

Entries for each day are listed alphabetically by surname. A typical entry lists information in the following sequence:

- Name, age, country of citizenship at birth, subsequent country of citizenship (if applicable), reason for notability, cause of death (if known), and reference.

== May 1984 ==
=== 1 ===
- Jüri Lossmann, 93, Estonian Olympic long-distance runner

=== 2 ===
- Jack Barry, 66, American game show host (The Joker's Wild), heart attack
- Bob Clampett, 70, American animator, film director, film producer and puppeteer, heart attack

=== 3 ===
- Aghashirin Jafarov, 77, Azerbaijani Red Army Starshina and a Hero of the Soviet Union.

=== 4 ===
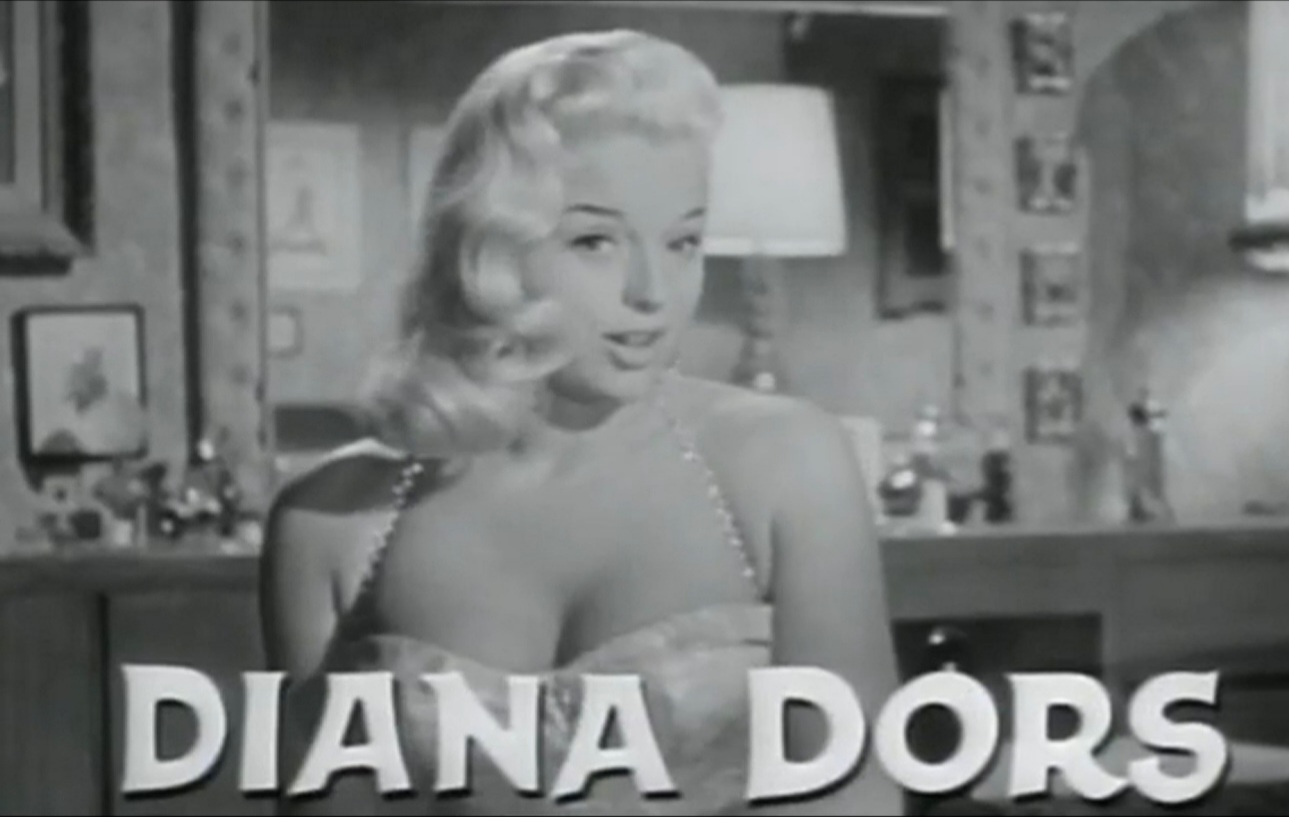
Diana Dors

- Diana Dors, 52, English actress, ovarian cancer

=== 5 ===
- J. C. Agajanian, 70, American motorsports promoter, race car owner, and Motorcycle Hall of Fame inductee

=== 6 ===
- Mary Cain, 79, American newspaper editor and politician

=== 7 ===
- Helen Kalvak, 82 or 83, Copper Inuk graphic artist

=== 8 ===
- William Ling, 75, English football referee

=== 9 ===
- Maureen O'Carroll, 71, Irish Labour Party politician
- Sergei Salnikov, 58, Russian footballer and Olympic gold medalist

=== 10 ===
- Joaquim Agostinho, 41, Portuguese professional bicycle racer

=== 11 ===
- Rajkavi Inderjeet Singh Tulsi, 58, Indian poet, lyricist, and author
- Toni Turek, 65, German football goalkeeper

=== 12 ===
- M. A. Muthiah Chettiar, 78, Indian Industrialist, banker, politician, philanthropist, and cultural activist

=== 13 ===
- Pat Abbott, 72, American golfer
- Stanislaw Ulam, 75, Polish-born American mathematician

=== 14 ===
- Walter Rauff, 77, SS commander in Nazi Germany

=== 15 ===
- Mary Adams, 86, English television producer, program director and administrator
- Lionel Robbins, Baron Robbins, 85, British economist
- Francis Schaeffer, 72, American Evangelical theologian, philosopher, and Presbyterian pastor

=== 16 ===
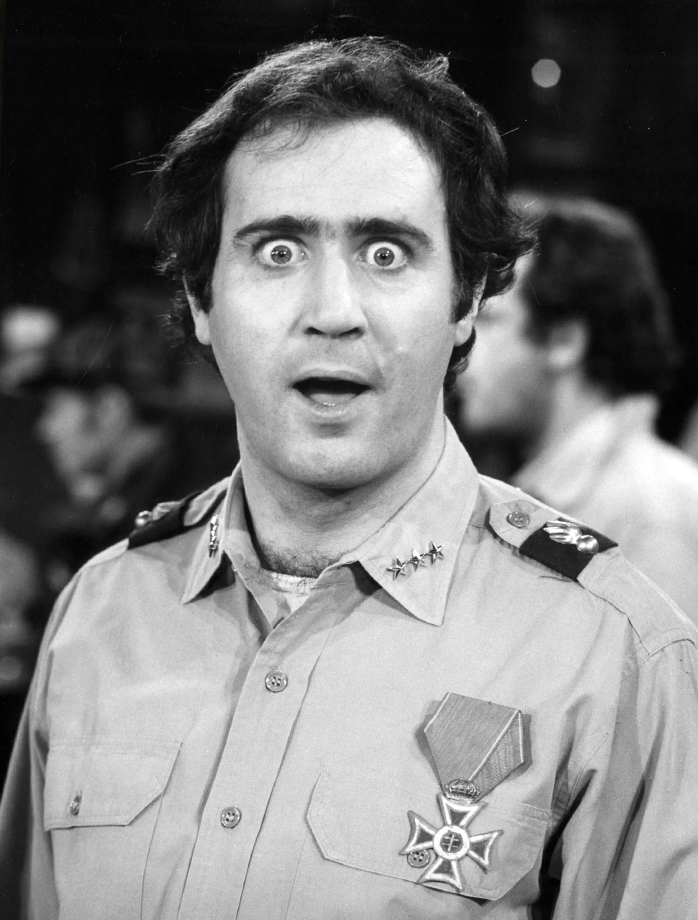
Andy Kaufman

- Ruth Ainsworth, 75, British writer
- Andy Kaufman, 35, American comedian
- Irwin Shaw, 71, American author, prostate cancer

=== 17 ===
- Frederick Alexander, 59, English cricketer

=== 18 ===
- Nasuh Akar, 59, Turkish sports wrestler and Olympic gold medalist

=== 19 ===
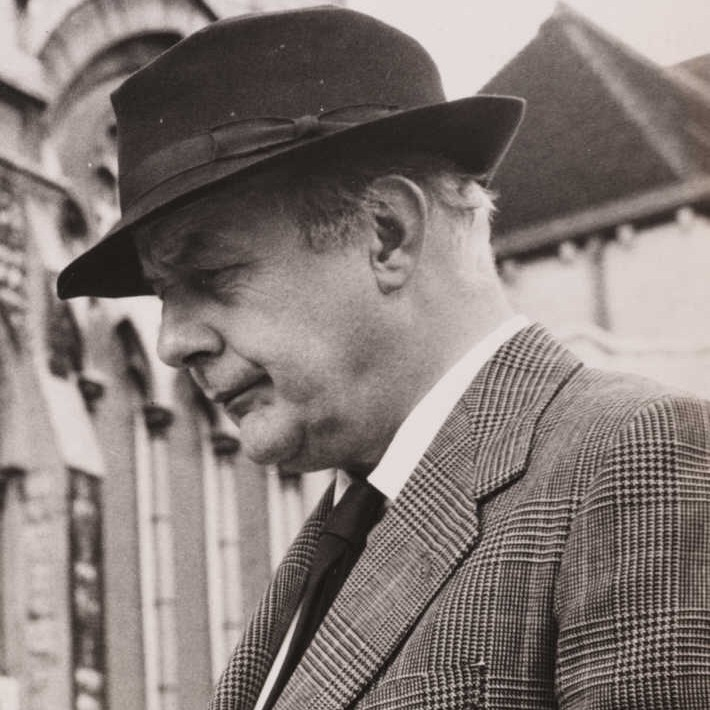
Sir John Betjeman

- Sir John Betjeman, 77, English diplomat and poet, Parkinson's disease

=== 20 ===
- Ólafur Jóhannesson, 71, 15th Prime Minister of Iceland

=== 21 ===
- Andrea Leeds, 70, American actress
- Ann Little, 93, American actress

=== 22 ===
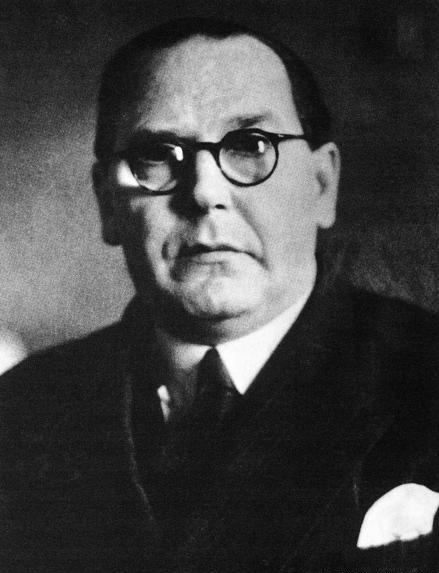
Karl-August Fagerholm

- Rambai Barni, 79, Queen consort of King Prajadhipok of Thailand
- Karl-August Fagerholm, 82, 20th Prime Minister of Finland
- John Marley, 76, American actor, death following open-heart surgery

=== 23 ===
- Luisa Rossi, 59, Italian actress

=== 24 ===
- Vincent J. McMahon, 69, American professional wrestling promoter

=== 25 ===
- Margaretha Reichardt, 77, German textile artist, weaver, and graphic designer

=== 26 ===
- Hilda Abbott, 93, Australian humanitarian
- Vera Stanley Alder, 85, English portrait painter and mystic

=== 27 ===
- Reginald Bosanquet, 51, British journalist and broadcaster

=== 28 ===
- Eric Morecambe, 58, British comedian
- D'Urville Martin, 45, American actor and director

=== 29 ===
- Cyril Lord, 72, British businessman and manufacturer

=== 30 ===
- Walter Smetak, 71, Swiss-born musician, composer, writer, sculptor and producer of musical instruments

=== 31 ===
- Juhani Järvinen, 49, Finnish speed skater
