= Deaths in February 1984 =

The following is a list of notable deaths in February 1984.

Entries for each day are listed alphabetically by surname. A typical entry lists information in the following sequence:

- Name, age, country of citizenship at birth, subsequent country of citizenship (if applicable), reason for notability, cause of death (if known), and reference.

== February 1984 ==
=== 1 ===
- Sir Arthur Armitage, 67, British academic, president of Queens' College, Cambridge and vice-chancellor of the University of Cambridge
- Hans Vinjarengen, 78, Norwegian skier

=== 2 ===
- Harry Lindblad, 71, Finnish ice hockey administrator, coach and player

=== 3 ===
- Paul Féret, 82, French tennis player
- Hubert Ney, 91, German politician

=== 4 ===
- Alan Buchanan, 78, Anglican bishop

=== 5 ===
- Allan Rogers Lindquest, 92, American voice teacher, tenor, recording artist, performer in musicals and operas, conductor, radio producer, and academic; also known as Albert Lindquest and Allan Rogers
- El Santo, 66, Mexican professional wrestler and actor

=== 6 ===
- Frank Byers, 68, British Liberal Party politician, heart attack
- Jorge Guillén, 91, Spanish poet

=== 7 ===
- Nolini Kanta Gupta, 71, Indian revolutionary, linguist, scholar, critic, poet, philosopher and yogi

=== 8 ===
- Karel Miljon, 80, Dutch boxer
- Philippe Ariès, 69, French medievalist and historian

=== 9 ===
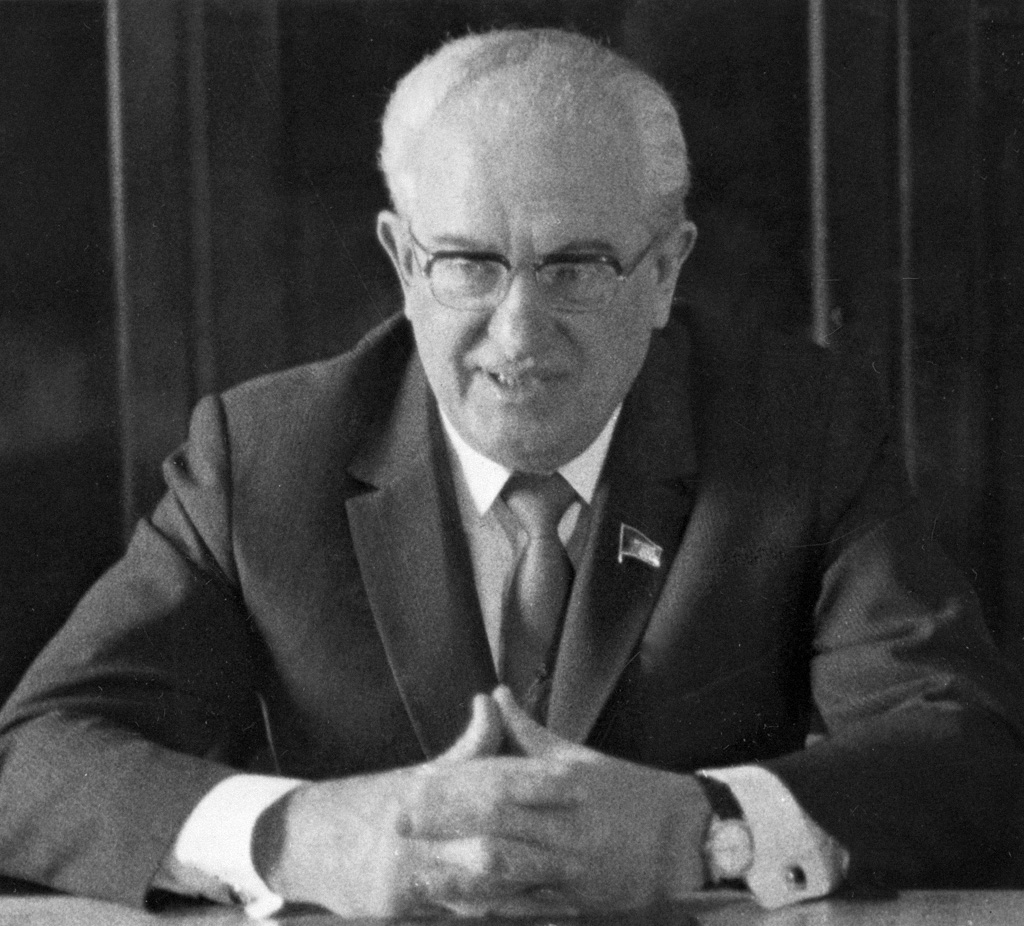
Yuri Andropov

- Yuri Andropov, 69, General Secretary of the Communist Party of the Soviet Union, kidney failure
- William Earl Rowe, 89, Canadian politician who was the 20th Lieutenant Governor of Ontario

=== 10 ===
- Tommy Briggs, 60, English professional footballer
- Ioan Evans, 56, Welsh politician

=== 11 ===
- Arlette Marchal, 82, French actress
- John Comer, 59, British actor (Last of the summer wine)

=== 12 ===
- Anna Anderson, 82, Pretender to the Russian throne
- Julio Cortázar, 69, Argentine writer, AIDS
- Elmer Keith, 84, American rancher, author, and firearms enthusiast

=== 13 ===
- Pierre Brambilla, 64, French road cyclist
- Naomi Uemura, 43, Japanese adventurer

=== 14 ===
- Haidakhan Babaji, Indian religious teacher
- Kevin Barrett, 68, Australian rules footballer

=== 15 ===
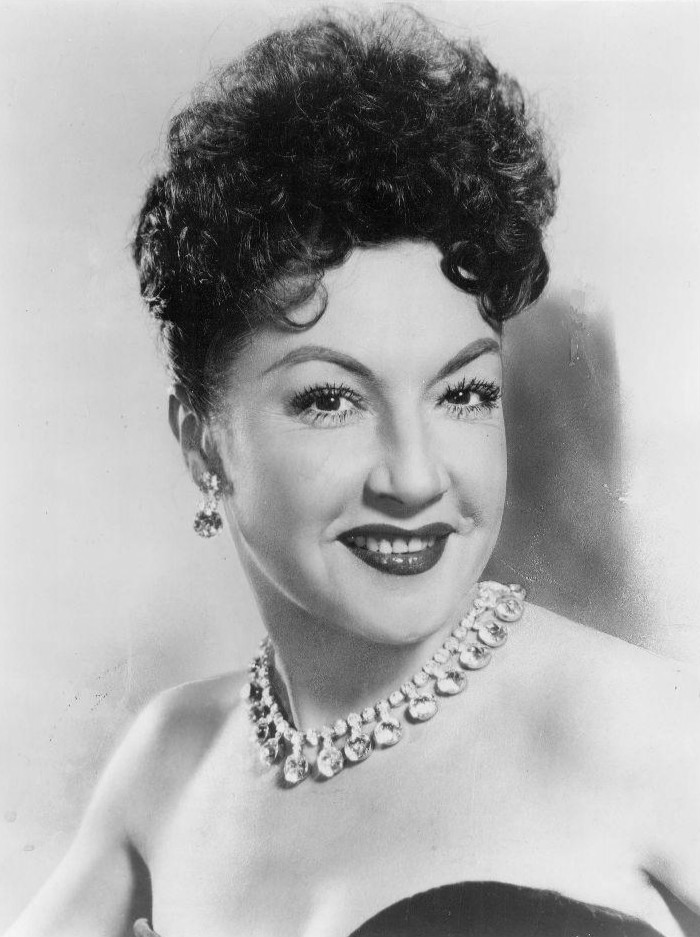
Ethel Merman

- Ethel Merman, 76, American singer and actress

=== 16 ===
- Kenny Williams, 69, American television announcer and host best known for his work on Hollywood Squares

=== 17 ===
- Pavel Batitsky, 73, Soviet military leader
- Yuri Andreyevich Smirnov, 60, Soviet linguist

=== 18 ===
- Betty Bryson, 72, American actress and dancer, she was frequently noted in the press for her physical resemblance to her fellow actress Janet Gaynor, a comparison which she described as both flattering and professionally limiting, she was named one of the year's WAMPAS Baby Stars in 1934, she wrote a syndicated beauty column in 1934 titled My Beauty Hint, which offered personal grooming tips and appeared in newspapers such as the Green Bay Press-Gazette
- Paul Gardiner, 25, English bass guitar player
- David Watson, 50, English Anglican priest, evangelist and author

=== 19 ===
- David Hacohen, 85, Israeli politician
- Jesse Pye, 64, English footballer

=== 20 ===
- Giuseppe Colombo, 63, Italian scientist, cancer

=== 21 ===
- Mikhail Sholokhov, 78, Russian writer, Nobel Prize laureate

=== 22 ===
- Uwe Johnson, 49, German novelist (died on either February 22 or February 23), suicide

=== 23 ===
- Maurice Tabard, 86, French photographer

=== 24 ===
- Ernst Hofbauer, 58, Austrian film director

=== 25 ===
- Bahram Afzali, 46, Iranian admiral who served as the Commander of the Iranian Navy

=== 26 ===
- Simone Berriau, 87, French actress
- Elizabeth Hoyer-Millar, 73, British naval officer who served as Commandant of the Women's Royal Naval Service

=== 27 ===
- Ana Rosa Tornero, Bolivian writer (b.1907, exact age unknown)

=== 28 ===
- Olu Aboderin, 49, Nigerian publisher

=== 29 ===
- Alexander Murray Drennan, 100, Scottish pathologist

== Sources ==
- Liebman, Roy (2000). The Wampas Baby Stars: A Biographical Dictionary, 1922–1934. Jefferson, North Carolina: McFarland. ISBN 0-7864-0756-5.
