= Deaths in August 1983 =

The following is a list of notable deaths in August 1983.

Entries for each day are listed alphabetically by surname. A typical entry lists information in the following sequence:

- Name, age, country of citizenship at birth, subsequent country of citizenship (if applicable), reason for notability, cause of death (if known), and reference.

== August 1983 ==
=== 1 ===
- Peter Arne, 64, British actor, bludgeoned to death in a murder-suicide

=== 2 ===
- James Jamerson, 47, American bassist and session musician, served as the uncredited bassist on most of Motown Records' hits during the 1960s and the early 1970s, he is reported to have played on nearly every Motown recording between 1963 and 1968, with his body of work during this era covering over 60 top-fifteen pop singles, complications from cirrhosis, heart failure and pneumonia

=== 3 ===
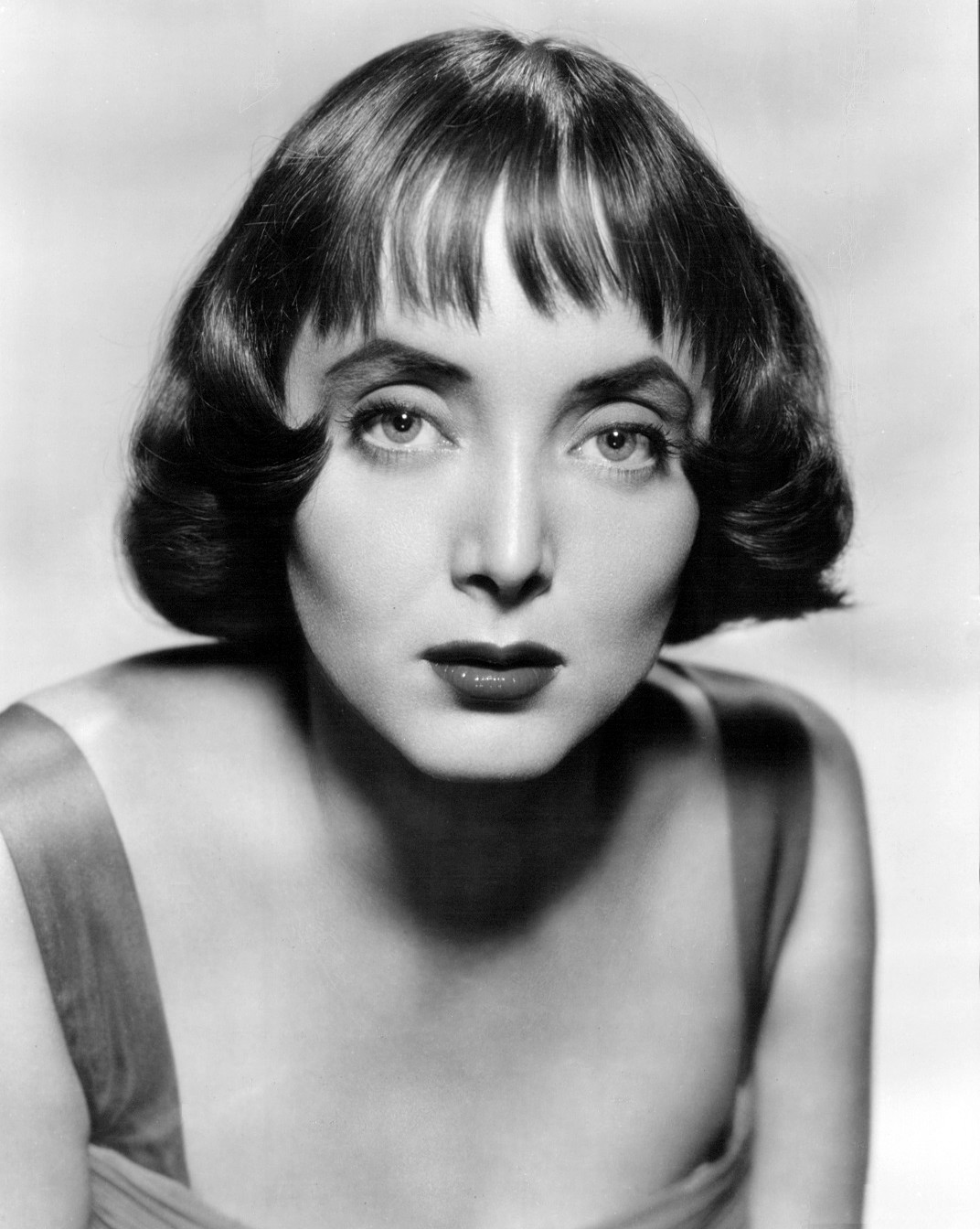
Carolyn Jones

- Jobriath, 36, American rock musician and actor, complications from AIDS (Note: Jobriath's death date has been given as August 3, 1983, and this is the date which appears on his gravestone. However, a 2021 article in The New York Times simply says he died "in the summer of 1983", and references a 2004 article in The Independent, which reports that he was found dead in July 1983, and had died more than a week before then.)
- Carolyn Jones, 53, American actress, colon cancer, died after falling into a coma

=== 4 ===
- Yuri Levitan, 68, Soviet radio announcer, he served as the primary radio announcer of Radio Moscow from the 1940s until the 1960s, covering all the major international events of the era, heart attack

=== 5 ===
- Bart Bok, 77, Dutch-born American astronomer, studied the structure and evolution of the Milky Way, he discovered the Bok globules , heart attack shortly after his return home from Java
- Judy Canova, 69, American comedienne, actress, singer and radio personality, cancer
- Joan Robinson, 79, British economist, one of the leaders of the neo-Ricardian and post-Keynesian schools
- Harold Shumate, 89, American screenwriter

=== 6 ===
- Grace Bailey, 79, American animator, head of the ink and paint department at Walt Disney Animation Studios
- Klaus Nomi, 39, German countertenor and performance artist, complications from AIDS. He was one of the earliest known figures from the arts community to die from the illness.

=== 7 ===
- David Ford, 57, American actor, heart attack

=== 11 ===
- Mamie Phipps Clark, 65, American social psychologist, her work focused on the development of self-consciousness in black preschool children, cancer
- Satsuo Yamamoto, 73, Japanese film director

=== 13 ===
- Bob Bailey, 70, American actor
- Sidney Ford, 73, British trade union leader, Parkinson's disease

=== 15 ===
- Al Kilgore, 55, American cartoonist and filmmaker

=== 16 ===
- Heinz Warneke, 88, German-born American sculptor and animalier, heart attack

=== 17 ===
- Ira Gershwin, 86, American lyricist, heart disease

=== 18 ===
- Nikolaus Pevsner, 81, German-born British historian, specialist in art history and the history of architecture

=== 21 ===
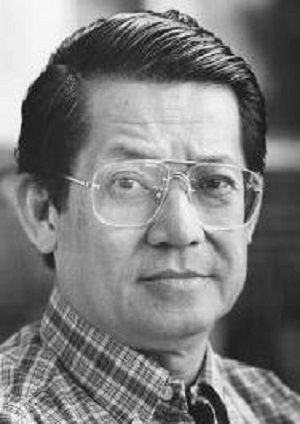
Ninoy Aquino

- Ninoy Aquino, 50, Filipino politician, served as the Governor of Tarlac from 1963 until 1967, and a senator from 1967 until 1972, assassinated shortly after his return from self-exile. The audio of the attack was recorded on a news camera, but the actual shooting of Aquino was not caught on camera due to the movement and exposure to bright sunlight.

=== 24 ===
- Jack Somack, 64, American chemical engineer and actor, heart attack

=== 26 ===
- Nazir Ahmed Khan, 78–79, Pakistani actor and filmmaker, considered one of the founding fathers for the cinema of Pakistan
- Mike Kellin, 61, American actor, lung cancer

=== 29 ===
- Rory Hayes, 34, American underground cartoonist and landscape painter, drug overdose
- Simon Oakland, 68, American actor and violinist, colon cancer

== Sources ==
- Hill, Gerald N.; Hill, Kathleen Thompson (1983). Aquino Assassination: The True Story and Analysis of the Assassination of Philippine Senator Benigno S. Aquino, Jr. Steve Psinakis. Sonoma, Calif.: Hilltop Pub. Co. ISBN 0-912133-04-X.
- Pylant, James (2012). In Morticia's Shadow: The Life & Career of Carolyn Jones. Jacobus Books. ISBN 978-0984185757.
