= John Agar-Hamilton =

South African historian and Anglican priest

John August Ion Agar-Hamilton (30 August 1895 – 16 June 1984) was a South African historian and Anglican priest. He was born in Cairo to Scottish parents who migrated to Transvaal Colony in 1906. He studied at Pretoria Boys High School and Transvaal University College, whence he obtained a BA in 1914. He may also have studied at the University of the Cape of Good Hope and Keble College, Oxford.

Returning to South Africa, he taught history at the University of Pretoria between 1923 and 1940. He served as a military historian during and after World War II and then as an Anglican clergyman in Pretoria from 1955 onwards. He moved to Grahamstown and joined Rhodes University in 1960 where he stayed till his retirement in 1966. He served the Diocese of Grahamstown editing the church directory and year book from 1967 to 1969, he was also a priest in the parish of Christ Church, Speke Street Grahamstown, he retired from active clerical life in 1980.

As a historian, he was influenced by George Cory. A prolific author, he is best known for Union war histories and The native policy of the Voortrekkers.

He died in Grahamstown in 1984.

== Published works ==
- These Men Shaped Your World. South African Broadcasting Corporation, Publicity Department. 1961.
- The Road to the North. South Africa, 1852-1886 ... With Maps. London. 1937.
- A Transvaal Jubilee: Being a History of the Church of the Province of South Africa in the Transvaal. Society for Promoting Christian Knowledge. 1928.
- If There Had Not Been Any Great Trek. 1943.
- The Native Policy of the Voortrekkers: An Essay in the History of the Interior of South Africa--1836-1858. M. Miller Limited. 1928.
- The Sidi Rezeg Battles, 1941. Oxford University Press. 1957. with Leonard Charles Frederick Turner
- South Africa. Arrowsmith. 1934.
- Crisis in the Desert, May July, 1942. [With Plates.]. Cape Town. 1952.
- "The South African Protectorates". Journal of the Royal African Society. 29 (113). Oxford University Press: 12–26. October 1929. JSTOR 716513.
