= Deaths in August 1982 =

The following is a list of notable deaths in August 1982.

Entries for each day are listed alphabetically by surname. A typical entry lists information in the following sequence:

- Name, age, country of citizenship at birth, subsequent country of citizenship (if applicable), reason for notability, cause of death (if known), and reference.

== August 1982 ==
=== 1 ===
- Agnes Gehrman, 89, American politician, member of the Washington State Legislature.
- T. Thirunavukarasu, 48, Sri Lankan Tamil politician, member of the Tamil United Liberation Front, MP for Vaddukoddai from 1977 until 1982,heart attack

=== 2 ===
- Cathleen Nesbitt, 93, English actress and autobiographer

=== 5 ===
- Dieter Borsche, 72, German actor.
- Sir John Charnley, 70, English orthopaedic surgeon, pioneer of hip replacement operation.

=== 6 ===
- S. K. Pottekkatt, 69, Indian writer of Malayalam literature, traveller, and politician, primarily known for his travelogues, complications from a paralytic stroke. Pottekkatt was hospitalized since July, without recovering his mobility

=== 7 ===
- Jill Banner, 35, American actress, she portrayed Virginia, the eponymous "spider baby" in the comedy horror film Spider Baby (1967), mortally injured in a car accident, when her car was hit by a truck

=== 9 ===
- Alexandre Alexeieff, 81. Russian expatriate filmmaker and illustrator, co-inventor of the pinscreen animation technique in the 1930s

=== 11 ===
- Tom Drake, 64, American actor, lung cancer

=== 12 ===
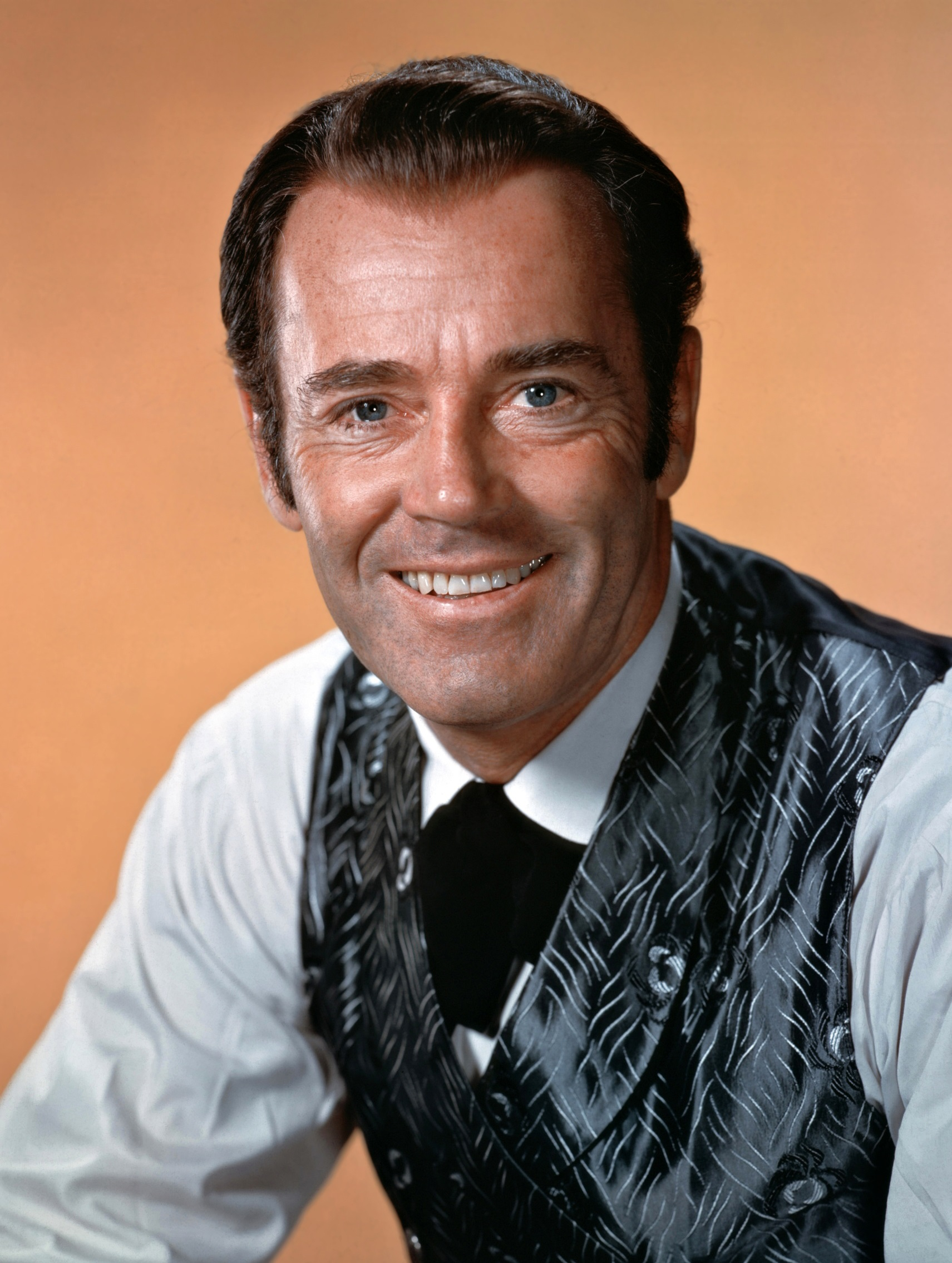
Henry Fonda

- Henry Fonda, 77, American actor, heart disease
- Salvador Sánchez, 23, Mexican professional boxer, featherweight champion from 1980 until 1982 for both the World Boxing Council (WBC) and The Ring, killed in a single-vehicle car accident, when he crashed his sports car along the federal highway

=== 13 ===
- Bjarne Andersen, 73, Norwegian actor, stage producer and theatre director,.
- Pratap Chandra Lal, 65, Indian chief of the Air Staff.
- Joe E. Ross, 68, American actor, comedian, and voice actor (Car 54, Where Are You? and Hong Kong Phooey), heart attack while performing in a clubhouse
- Joe Tex, 47, American singer and musician
- Charles Walters, 70, American film director and choreographer (Metro-Goldwyn-Mayer), lung cancer.

=== 14 ===
- Patrick Magee, 60, Irish actor, he created the role of the Marquis de Sade in the original stage and screen productions of Marat/Sade,heart attack

=== 15 ===
- George Brasno, 70, American actor, singer, and vaudevillian, part of a professional sibling duo of little persons with his sister
- Ernie Bushmiller, 76, American cartoonist, creator of the comic strip character Nancy, he had previously taken over the older comic strip Fritzi Ritz
- Maurice Gallay, 79, French footballer; he played as a defender for Olympique de Marseille and the French national team in the 1920s, he helped the OM team to win back-to-back Coupe de France titles in 1926 and 1927
- Hugo Theorell, 79, Swedish scientist, he received the Nobel Prize in Physiology or Medicine in 1955 for discovering oxidoreductase enzymes and their effects

=== 17 ===
- Barney Phillips, 68, American actor, cancer

=== 18 ===
- Carlos Botelho, 82, Portuguese painter, illustrator, comics artist, political cartoonist, satirist and caricaturist, writer of Ecos da Semana (Echoes of the Week), a series of autobiographical comics which lasted from 1928 until 1950

=== 20 ===
- Ulla Jacobsson, 53, Swedish actress, she became internationally famous for her nude scenes in One Summer of Happiness (1951), bone cancer
- George David Woods, 81, American investment banker and financier, chairman of the First Boston Corporation, he served as the President of the World Bank from 1963 until 1968, a director of The New York Times Company

=== 21 ===
- Connie Izay, 53, American professional nurse, actress, and medical technical advisor on several television series, including M*A*S*H, Marcus Welby, M.D., and Bonanza, her job involved reading scripts for medical errors, highlighting the terminology which the actors needed to pronounce correctly, and showing the actors how to properly hold medical equipment,breast cancer
- Sobhuza II, 83, King of Swaziland (reigned 1899-1906, 1968-1982), Paramount Chief of the Swaziland Protectorate (1906-1968)

=== 23 ===
- Alfred S. Bloomingdale, 86, American businessman (d. 1982)
- Alberto Cavalcanti, 85, Brazilian film director, producer, and set designer, director of propaganda films for the Ealing Studios during the 1940s,blacklisted as a communist
- Stanford Moore, 68, American chemist, Nobel Prize laureate.

=== 25 ===
- Hans van Tongeren, 27, Dutch actor, he portrayed the suicidal motocrosser Rien in his debut film Spetters (1980), death by suicide

=== 26 ===
- Anna German, 46, Polish singer, she toured, performed and recorded in the Soviet Union during the 1970s,

=== 27 ===
- Anandamayi Ma, 86, Indian saint, teacher, and mystic, she was revered as an incarnation of Hindu goddess Durga.

=== 29 ===
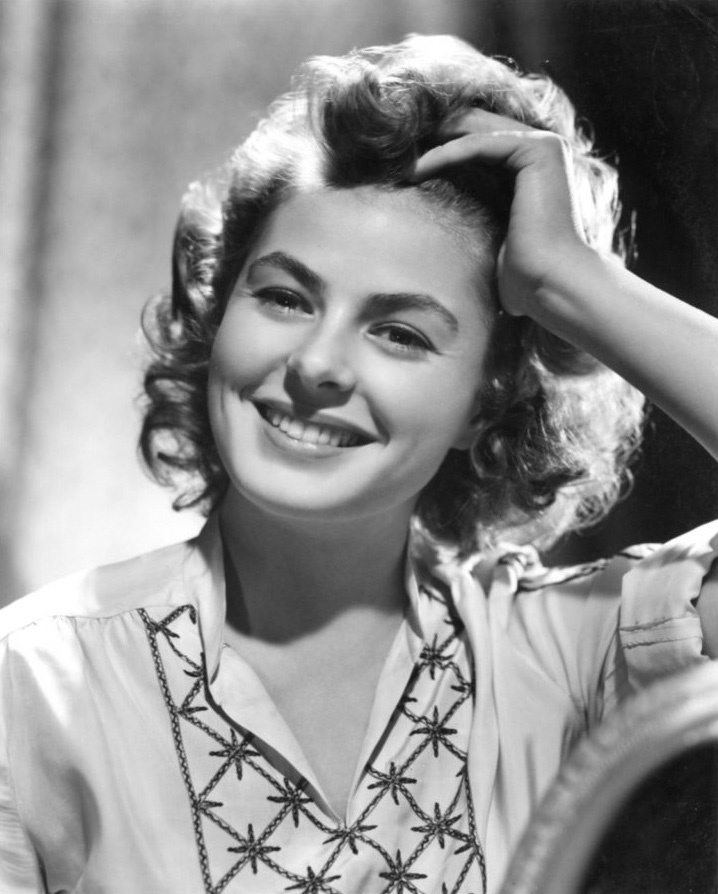
Ingrid Bergman

- Ingrid Bergman, 67, Swedish actress and autobiographer, breast cancer which had spread to her spine, collapsing her twelfth vertebra; her right lung no longer functioned, and only a small part of her left lung had not collapsed
- Nahum Goldmann, 87, Belarusian Zionist, founder of the World Jewish Congress, he served as the organization's president from 1951 until 1978, president of the World Zionist Organization from 1956 until 1968,pulmonary collapse

=== 30 ===
- Eugene Loring, 71, American dancer, choreographer, teacher, and administrator, he introduced his own dance notation, known as Kineseography, chairman of the Department of Dance in the University of California, Irvine from 1965 until his retirement in 1981

== Sources ==
- Leamer, Laurence (1986). As Time Goes By: The Life of Ingrid Bergman. New York: Harper & Row. ISBN 0-06-015485-3.
