= Deaths in November 1983 =

The following is a list of notable deaths in November 1983.

Entries for each day are listed alphabetically by surname. A typical entry lists information in the following sequence:

- Name, age, country of citizenship at birth, subsequent country of citizenship (if applicable), reason for notability, cause of death (if known), and reference.

== November 1983 ==
=== 1 ===
- Maurice Woods, 45, American actor, cancer

=== 3 ===
- Alfredo Antonini, 82, Italian–American orchestral conductor and composer, worked for the CBS radio and television networks from the 1930s until the early 1970s, died during his heart surgery

=== 5 ===
- Jean-Marc Reiser, 42, French comics creator and black comedy artist, bone cancer

=== 7 ===
- Germaine Tailleferre, 91, French composer, the only female member of the group of composers known as Les Six

=== 8 ===
- James Hayden, 29, American actor, heroin overdose
- Betty Nuthall, 72, English tennis player, coronary arrest

=== 13 ===
- Aliagha Aghayev, 70, Azerbaijani actor
- Jam Handy, 97, American Olympic breaststroke swimmer, water polo player, film producer, and pioneer in distance education
- Junior Samples, 57, American comedian, heart attack
- Louise Tracy, 87, founder of the John Tracy Clinic, a private, non-profit education center for the deaf

=== 15 ===
- John Le Mesurier, 71, English actor, recurring haemorrhage, had slipped into a coma shortly before his death

=== 19 ===
- Peter Coffield, 38, American actor, AIDS-related illness
- Tom Evans, 36, English bass guitarist, singer, and songwriter, member of the Welsh rock band Badfinger and influential musician in the power pop genre,suicide by hanging
- Carolyn Leigh, 57, American lyricist, heart attack

=== 20 ===
- Richard Loo, 80, American character actor

=== 22 ===
- Michael Conrad, 58, American actor, urethral cancer
- Leonard Wibberley, 68, Irish novelist, satirist, historian, and biographer, heart attack

=== 23 ===
- Waheed Murad, 45, Pakistani film actor, producer, and screenwriter, died after chewing a paan leaf containing an unidentified substance; unclear if the cause of death was a heart attack or suicide.

=== 23 ===
- Alberto Uribe Sierra, 50, Colombian rancher, businessman, and father of former Colombian President Álvaro Uribe Vélez, assassination.

=== 27 ===
- Jorge Ibargüengoitia, 55, Mexican novelist, playwright, satirist, and short-story writer, one of the victims of the Avianca Flight 011
- Ángel Rama, 57, Uruguayan academic and literary critic, one of the victims of the Avianca Flight 011
- Rosa Sabater, 54, Spanish pianist, one of the victims of the Avianca Flight 011
- Manuel Scorza, 55, Peruvian novelist, poet, and exiled political activist, one of the victims of the Avianca Flight 011
- Marta Traba, 53, Argentine art critic, museum director, and university teacher, one of the victims of the Avianca Flight 011>

=== 28 ===
- Christopher George, 52, American actor, heart attack. George had a known heart disease, and had undergone coronary bypass surgery about five years prior to his death.

=== 30 ===
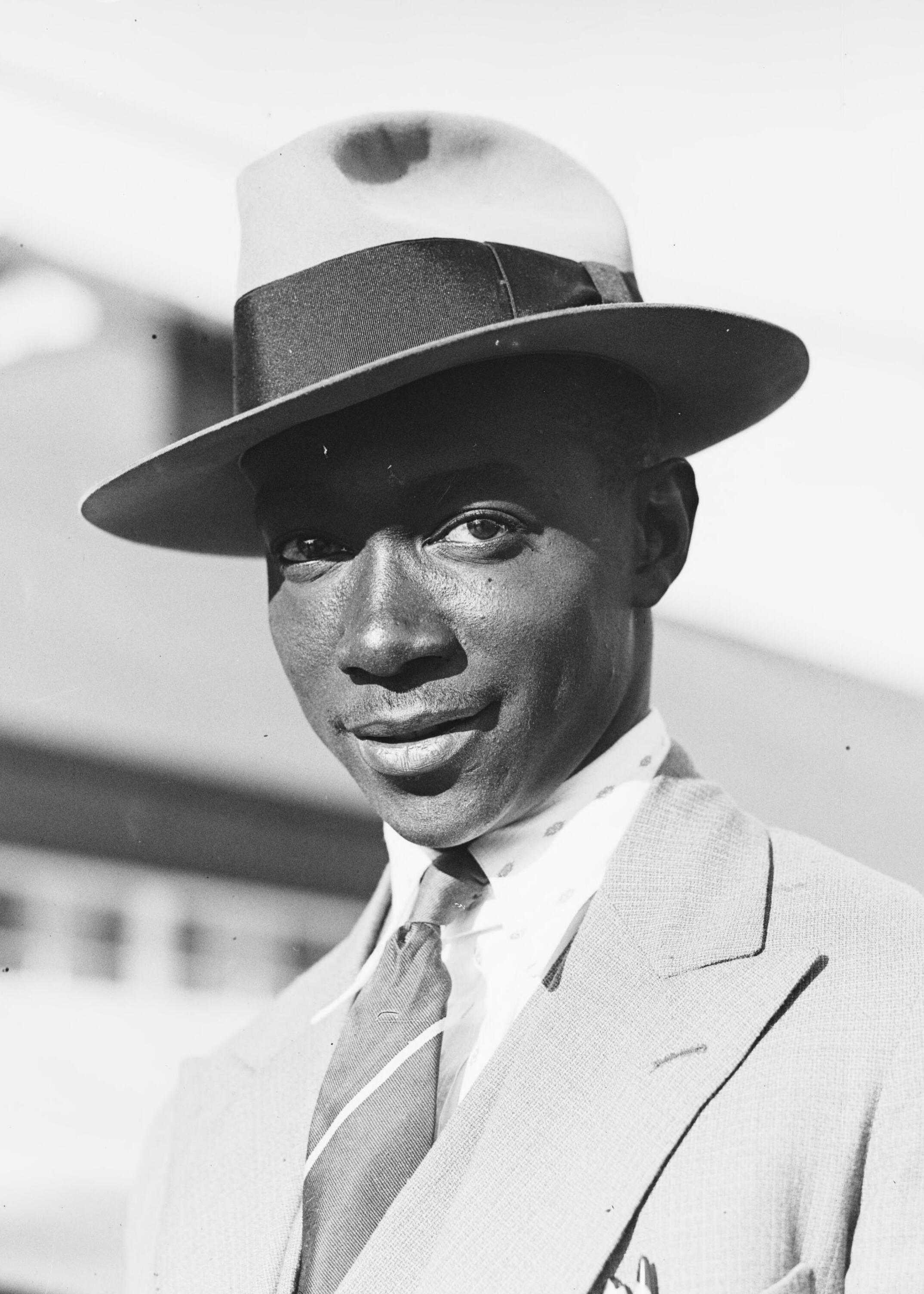
George Headley

- George Headley, 74, Jamaican cricketer, considered one of the best batsmen to play for the West Indies cricket team and one of the greatest cricketers of all time
- Richard Llewellyn, 77, British novelist, heart attack
- Michael Witney, 52, American actor, minor league pitcher for the Hornell Dodgers and the Great Falls Electrics,heart attack

== Sources ==
- Le Mesurier, Joan (1988). Lady Don't Fall Backwards: A memoir dedicated to Tony Hancock and John Le Mesurier. London: Sidgwick & Jackson. ISBN 978-0-283-99664-1.
- McCann, Graham (2010). Do You Think That's Wise? The life of John Le Mesurier. London: Aurum Press. ISBN 978-1-84513-583-6.
