= Deaths in April 1984 =

The following is a list of notable deaths in April 1984.

Entries for each day are listed alphabetically by surname. A typical entry lists information in the following sequence:

- Name, age, country of citizenship at birth, subsequent country of citizenship (if applicable), reason for notability, cause of death (if known), and reference.

== April 1984 ==
=== 1 ===
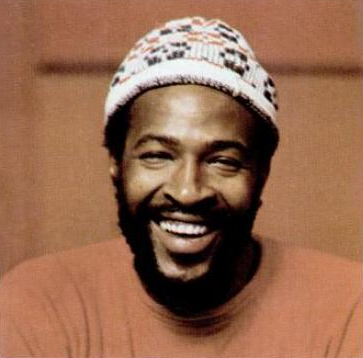
Marvin Gaye

- Marvin Gaye, 44, American singer, murdered by his father
- Elizabeth Goudge, 83, English writer

=== 2 ===
- Ernst van Aaken, 73, German sports physician and athletics trainer

=== 3 ===
- Gerhard Brosi, 40, German politician of the Social Democratic Party

=== 4 ===
- Oleg Antonov, 78, Soviet aeroplane designer

=== 5 ===
- Robert Adams, 67, English sculptor and designer
- Sir Arthur Harris, 91, British air marshal
- Giuseppe Tucci, 89, Italian scholar

=== 6 ===
- Jimmy Kennedy, 81, British songwriter

=== 7 ===
- Frank Church, 59, American politician

=== 8 ===
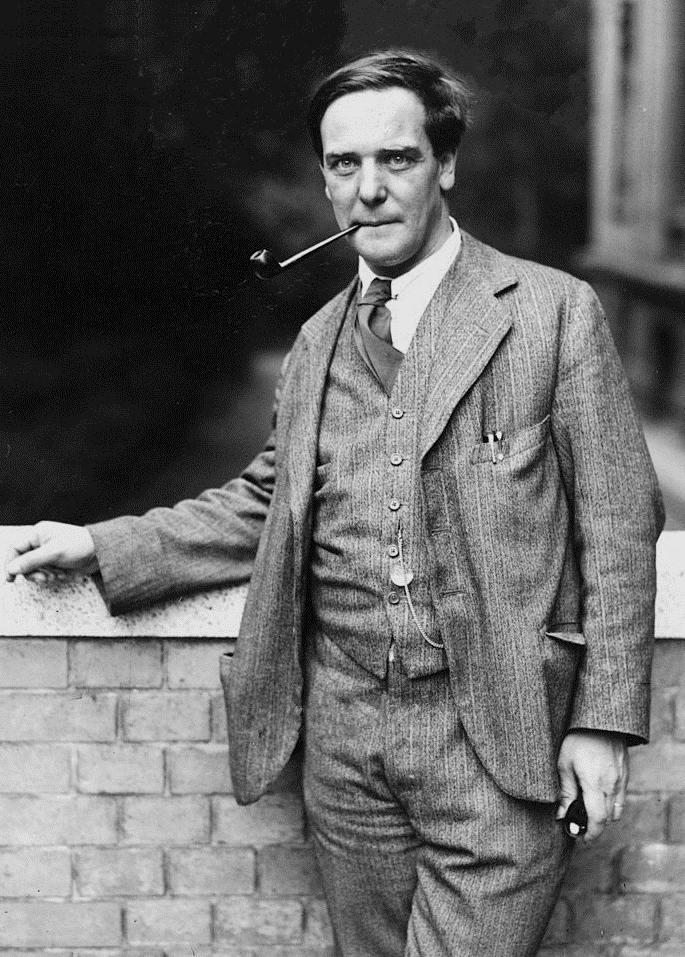
Pyotr Kapitsa

- Pyotr Kapitsa, 89, Russian physicist, Nobel Prize laureate

=== 9 ===
- Willem Sandberg, 86, Dutch typographer

=== 10 ===
- Jakub Berman, 82, Polish communist politician

=== 11 ===
- Adhémar Raynault, 92, Canadian politician and a Mayor of Montreal

=== 12 ===
- Edward Sokoine, 45, 2nd Prime Minister of Tanzania
- Ruth Taylor, 79, American actress in silent films and early talkies

=== 13 ===
- Richard Hurndall, 73, English actor

=== 14 ===
- Anatoly Agranovsky, 62, Soviet journalist, novelist, screenwriter, and animator

=== 15 ===
- Tommy Cooper, 63, Welsh comedian and magician
- Sir William Empson, 77, English poet and critic

=== 16 ===
- Byron Haskin, 84, American film and television director

=== 17 ===
- Mark W. Clark, 87, American general

=== 18 ===
- Pierre Frank, 78, French Trotskyist leader
- Francis de Wolff, 71, English character actor

=== 19 ===
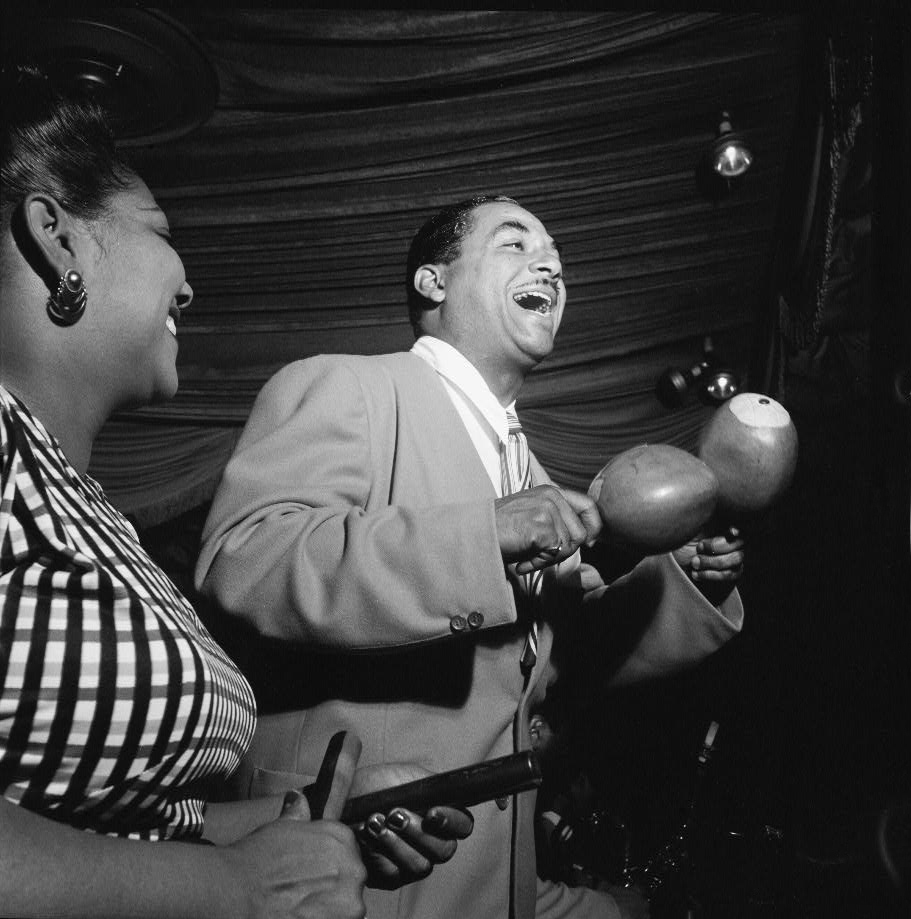
Machito

- Machito, 74, Cuban jazz musician

=== 20 ===
- Otto Arosemena, 58, 32nd President of Ecuador

=== 21 ===
- Marcel Janco, 88, Romanian-Israeli artist

=== 22 ===
- Ansel Adams, 82 American photographer, cardiovascular disease

=== 23 ===
- Roland Penrose, 83, English artist, historian and poet

=== 24 ===
- Shafee Okarvi, 54, Pakistani religious scholar and orator

=== 25 ===
- Anthony John Aglen, 72, Scottish civil servant
- Céleste Albaret, 92, French woman known for her association with Marcel Proust

=== 26 ===
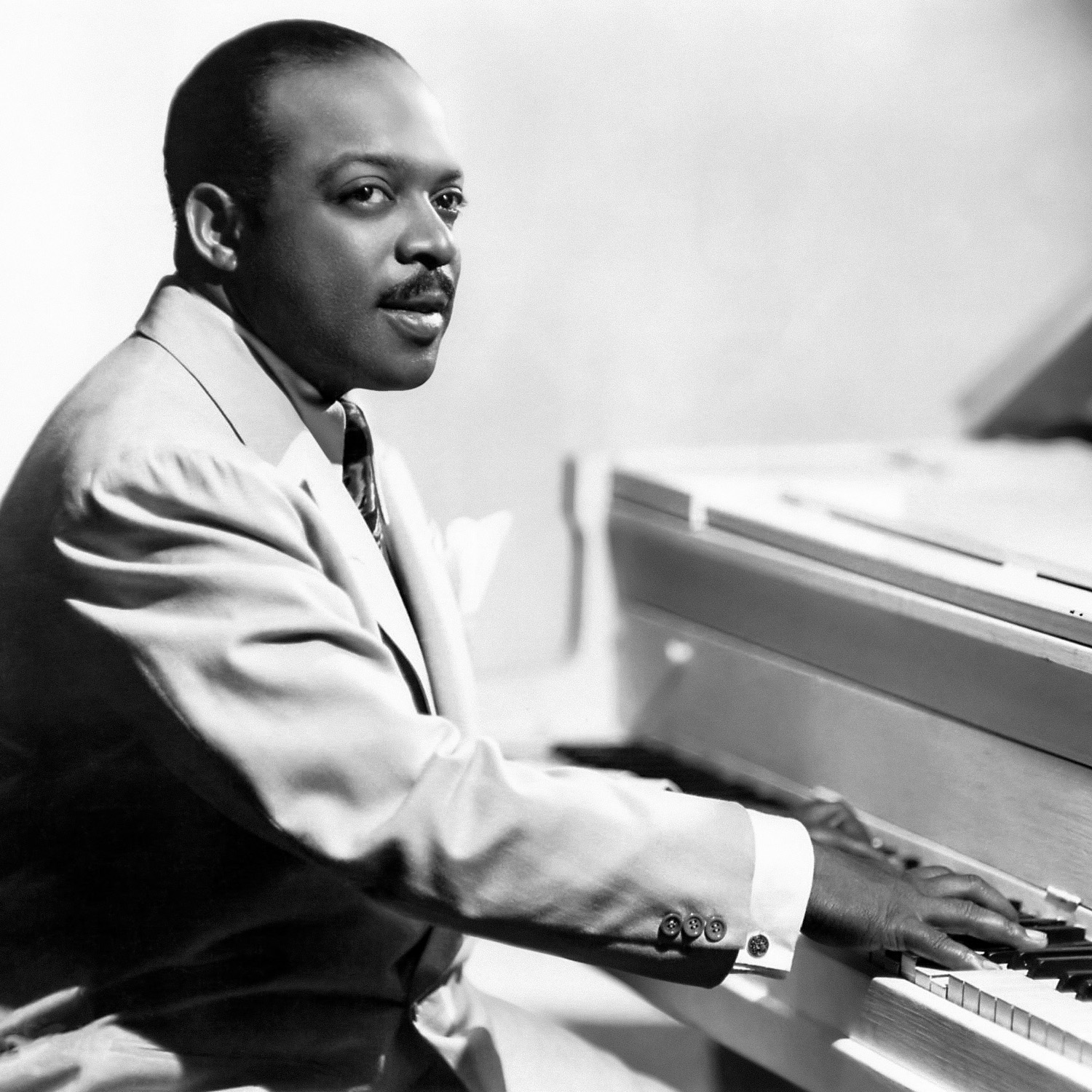
Count Basie

- Count Basie, 79, American musician and composer, pancreatic cancer
- May McAvoy, 84, American actress, heart attack

=== 27 ===
- Richard Durham, 66, American radio scriptwriter and civil rights activist

=== 28 ===
- Piet Kraak, 63, Dutch football goalkeeper and manager

=== 29 ===
- Karol Estreicher, 78, Polish historian of art, writer and bibliographer
- Baltzar von Platen, 86, Swedish engineer and inventor

=== 30 ===
- Johannes Aarøy, 73, a Norwegian civil servant
- Michael Adeane, Baron Adeane, 73, Private Secretary to Elizabeth II
- Rodrigo Lara Bonilla, 37, Colombian lawyer and politician
