= Deaths in July 1983 =

The following is a list of notable deaths in July 1983.

Entries for each day are listed alphabetically by surname. A typical entry lists information in the following sequence:

- Name, age, country of citizenship at birth, subsequent country of citizenship (if applicable), reason for notability, cause of death (if known), and reference.

== July 1983 ==
=== 1 ===
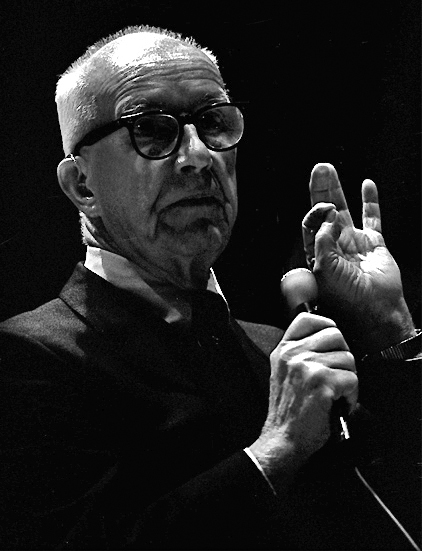
Buckminster Fuller

- Buckminster Fuller, 87, American architect, systems theorist, writer, designer, inventor, philosopher, and futurist, heart attack

=== 4 ===
- John Bodkin Adams, 84, British general practitioner, convicted fraudster, and suspected serial killer.Chest infection while hospitalized for a fractured hip.

=== 5 ===
- Harry James, 67, American bandleader, trumpeter, and actor, lymphatic cancer

=== 7 ===
- Herman Kahn, 61, American physicist and futurist, he posited the idea of a "winnable" nuclear exchange in his 1960 book On Thermonuclear War, for which he was one of the historical inspirations for the title character of Stanley Kubrick's classic black comedy film satire Dr. Strangelove, stroke
- Alexander Fu Sheng, 28, Hong Kong martial arts actor, chest injuries and shock as a passenger in a car accident
- Vic Wertz, 58, American baseball player, during heart surgery

=== 9 ===
- Robert Dawn, 61, American make-up artist and fighter pilot during World War II, earned the Distinguished Flying Cross, the Purple Heart and the Silver Star for his wartime service

=== 10 ===
- Paul Blaisdell, 55, American painter, sculptor and visual effects creator, created the effects for several science fiction and horror fiction B movies, cancer
- Estrellita Castro, 75, Spanish singer and actress

=== 11 ===
- Ross Macdonald, 67, American-Canadian crime fiction writer, representative of the hardboiled genre, creator of the character Lew Archer, Alzheimer's disease

=== 12 ===
- Chris Wood, 39, British rock musician, founding member of the rock band Traffic, liver disease

=== 13 ===
- Gabrielle Roy, 74, Canadian novelist and sketch artist

=== 15 ===
- Eddie Foy Jr., 78, American actor and vaudeville performer, pancreatic cancer

=== 16 ===
- Michel Micombero, 42, Burundian military officer and politician, ruled the country as a de facto military dictator from 1966 until 1976, heart attack (Note: According to the obituary published in The New York Times two days later, Micombero died on 16 July 1983. His entry in the Dictionary of African Biography gives 6 August 1983 instead.)

=== 17 ===
- Byron Kennedy, 33, Australian film producer, co-creator of the media franchise Mad Max, killed in a helicopter crash
- Hendra Gunawan, 65, Indonesian painter and sculptor, heart attack

=== 18 ===
- George Lichty, 78, American cartoonist, creator of the daily strip and Sunday strip Grin and Bear It, heart attack

=== 19 ===
- Erik Ode, 72, German actor.

=== 20 ===
- Frank Reynolds, 59, American television journalist for CBS and ABC News, acute viral hepatitis
- Ann Tyrrell, 74, American actress and dialectician, heart attack

=== 22 ===
- Jack Rickard, 61, American illustrator and comics artist, key contributor to Mad, cancer

=== 25 ===
- Jerome Moross, 69, American composer, complications of a stroke and congestive heart failure

=== 28 ===
- Katharine Bard, 66, American actress, cancer

=== 29 ===
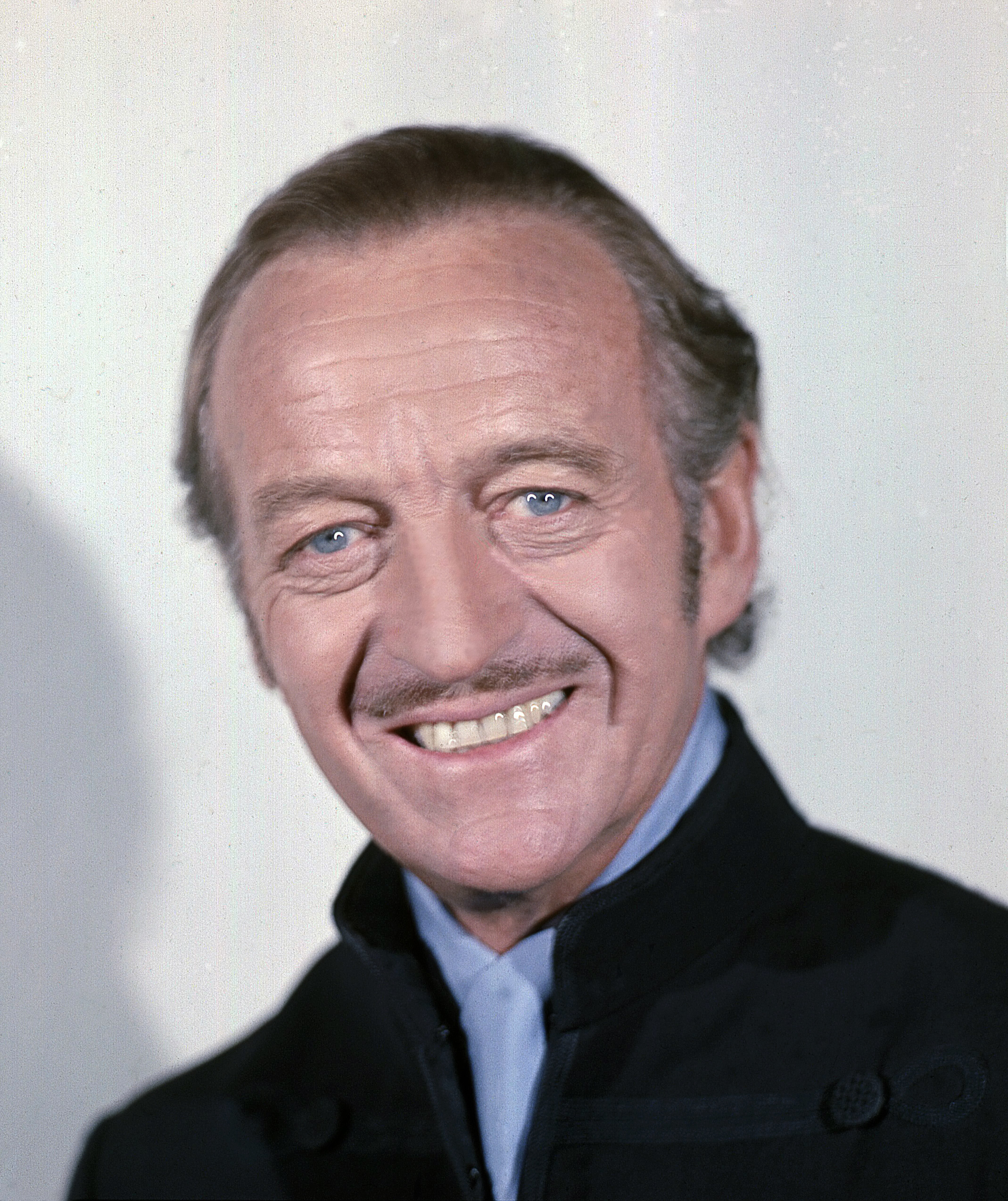
David Niven

- Luis Buñuel, 83, Spanish-born Mexican filmmaker, representative of surrealist cinema, diabetes complications
- Rocco Chinnici, 58, Italian anti-Mafia magistrate, creator of the Antimafia Pool, killed by a car bomb
- Raymond Massey, 86, Canadian actor, pneumonia
- David Niven, 73, English actor, soldier, raconteur, memoirist and novelist, ALS (amyotrophic lateral sclerosis)

=== 30 ===
- Howard Dietz, 86, American publicist, lyricist, and librettist, specialist in musical revues, Parkinson's disease
- Lynn Fontanne, 95, English actress, pneumonia

== Sources ==
- Schneider, Jane T. & Peter T. Schneider (2003). Reversible Destiny: Mafia, Antimafia, and the Struggle for Palermo, Berkeley: University of California Press ISBN 0-520-23609-2
- Stille, Alexander (1995). Excellent Cadavers: The Mafia and the Death of the First Italian Republic, New York: Vintage ISBN 0-09-959491-9
- "Michel Micombero, 43, Dies: Former President of Burundi". The New York Times. UPI. July 18, 1983.
- Chrétien, Jean-Pierre (2008). "Micombero, Michel". In Gates, Louis Jr.; Akyeampong, Emmanuel K. (eds.). Dictionary of African Biography. Vol. 4. Oxford: Oxford University Press.
- Robins, Jane (2013). The Curious Habits of Dr Adams: A 1950s Murder Mystery. John Murray. ISBN 978-1-84854-470-3.
- Cullen, Pamela V. (2006). A Stranger in Blood: The Case Files on Dr John Bodkin Adams. London: Elliott & Thompson. ISBN 1-904027-19-9.
