= Deaths in October 1983 =

The following is a list of notable deaths in October 1983.

Entries for each day are listed alphabetically by surname. A typical entry lists information in the following sequence:

- Name, age, country of citizenship at birth, subsequent country of citizenship (if applicable), reason for notability, cause of death (if known), and reference.

== October 1983 ==
=== 1 ===
- Hermione Hannen, 70, English actress

=== 3 ===
- John McCaffery, 69, American television host and anchorman
- Earl Tupper, 76, American businessman and inventor (Tupperware)

=== 4 ===
- Dino Battaglia, 60, Italian comics artist, co-founder of the magazine Asso di Picche, adapted gothic fiction short stories and novels into comic books, focusing primarily on the works Edgar Allan Poe, H. P. Lovecraft, Robert Louis Stevenson, Guy de Maupassant, E. T. A. Hoffmann, and François Rabelais

=== 6 ===
- Terence Cooke, 62, American Catholic prelate, Archbishop of New York from 1968 until his death, cardinal since 1969, leukemia
- Dennis Vance, 59, British television producer, television director, and occasional actor

=== 7 ===
- George O. Abell, 56, American astronomer and professor at the University of California, Los Angeles (UCLA), heart attack
- Christophe Soglo, 74, Beninese military officer and political leader, World War II veteran of the Allies' landings in Corsica, Elba, and southern France, President of Dahomey from 1965 until 1967

=== 8 ===
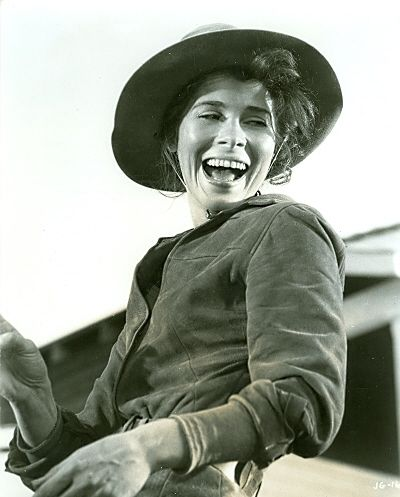
Joan Hackett

- Joan Hackett, 49, American actress, ovarian cancer

=== 10 ===
- Salise Abanozoğlu, 78–79, Turkish teacher and politician, member of the Republican People's Party and political representative for the Trabzon constituency
- Ruby Myers, 75–76, Indian actress, founder of the film production house Rubi Pics
- Ralph Richardson, 80, English actor, series of strokes

=== 11 ===
- Fay Tincher, 99, American actress and comedian

=== 12 ===
- Ernie Roth, 57, American professional wrestling manager, heart attack

=== 14 ===
- Paul Fix, 82, American character actor, kidney failure
- Hon Sui Sen, 67, Singaporean politician.

=== 15 ===
- Pat O'Brien, 83, American actor, heart attack

=== 16 ===
- George Liberace, 72, American musician

=== 17 ===
- Mary Ellen Bute, 76, American animator, producer, and director, creator of some of the first electronically generated film images, specialist in visual music, heart failure.

=== 18 ===
- Barbara Karinska, 97, Russian costume designer, complications from a debilitating stroke which had left her unable to speak or move for the last years of her life

=== 19 ===
- Maurice Bishop, 39, Grenadian revolutionary, leader of the New JEWEL Movement (NJM), head of the People's Revolutionary Government of Grenada (PRG) from 1979 until 1983, deposed as Prime Minister and executed by firing squad during a coup d'état.
- Dorothy Stuart Russell, 88, Australian-born British pathologist
- Carel Willink, 83, Dutch painter, representative of Magical realism

=== 20 ===
- Otto Aasen, 89, Norwegian Nordic skier
- Merle Travis, 65, American country and western singer, songwriter, actor, and guitarist, heart attack

=== 23 ===
- Jessica Savitch, 36, American television journalist, served as the weekend anchor of NBC Nightly News, a daily newsreader for NBC News, and the host of Frontline, drowned in the then-defunct Pennsylvania Canal following a car crash
- Tamara Shayne, 80, Russian-born American actress, complications following a heart attack

=== 26 ===
- Norman Cohen, 47, Irish film director and producer, heart attack

=== 28 ===
- Otto Messmer, 91, American animator and alleged creator or co-creator of Felix the Cat, heart attack

=== 30 ===
- Lillian Gordy Carter, 85, American nurse, Peace Corps volunteer in India, housemother of the Kappa Alpha Order from 1956 until 1962, letter writer with a published volume of correspondence, breast cancer metastasized to the bone

== Sources ==
- Blair, Gwenda. Almost Golden: Jessica Savitch and the Selling of Television News. New York: Simon & Schuster, 1988. ISBN 978-0671632854.
- Doyle, B.H.; Slide, A. (1995). The Ultimate Directory of the Silent Screen Performers: A Necrology of Births and Deaths and Essays on 50 Lost Players. G – Reference, Information and Interdisciplinary Subjects Series. Scarecrow Press. ISBN 978-0-8108-2958-9.
- Houngnikpo, Mathurin C.; Decalo, Samuel (2012). Historical Dictionary of Benin (4th ed.). Scarecrow Press. ISBN 9780810873735.
