= Edward Virgil Abner =

American Singer and Music Composer

Edward Virgil Abner (sometimes billed as E. Virgil Abner or simply Virgil Abner; 1925–1984) was an American tenor and psychologist. As a singer he was primarily active in the 1950s and 1960s. He performed with the Lyric Opera of Chicago among other organizations. He later was a research fellow at the University of Michigan where he taught psychology. At the time of his death in 1984 he was employed as a psychologist at the Clinton Valley Center in Pontiac, Michigan.

== Life and career ==
Abner studied at the Chicago Musical College, and in 1950 was the winner of the Chicago Music Association scholarship.

In 1949, Abner was the choral director of a 40-person gospel choir that performed a number of spirituals on Chicago's WMOR radio station.

In 1951, he led a vocal ensemble called the Knights of Music, which featured Alton Abraham, who would go on to become jazz composer Sun Ra's collaborator and business manager. The group performed a wide range of compositions in many different genres, from Bach and Handel to theatre songs by Rodgers and Hammerstein to spiritual music and even pop songs. The group would on occasion feature as guest accompanist a young Ramsey Lewis. In 1953, Abner performed at the convention of the National Association of Negro Musicians, presided over by blues composer W.C. Handy.

Throughout the 1950s and 1960s however, Virgil was more known for his work in the opera genre. In 1953, he became the director of the Chicago Opera Group. He sang in lead roles in Aida at the St. Louis Opera Company. He played the role of the messenger in Il trovatore and Giuseppi in La traviata in the Lyric Opera of Chicago's 1956 season. In 1960, Abner performed as a soloist with the North Side Symphony Orchestra of Chicago. And in 1962, Abner was the soloist in Ludwig van Beethoven's Missa solemnis at Milton College.

Abner died on June 5, 1984 in Ypsilanti, Michigan at the age of 59.
