= Deaths in July 1977 =

The following is a list of notable deaths in July 1977. Entries for each day are listed alphabetically by surname. A typical entry lists information in the following sequence:

- Name, age, country of citizenship at birth, subsequent country of citizenship (if applicable), reason for notability, cause of death (if known), and reference.

== July 1977 ==
=== 1 ===
- Karl Davis, 69, American professional wrestler,he is regarded as one of the most hated "heel performers" of the 1930s and the 1940s, he was given the moniker "Crippler" after injuring Whipper Billy Watson during a bout in Toronto,unclear cause of death. At the time of his death, Davis was living alone, destitute and surviving on social security, having lost most of his money through bad investments over the years.

=== 2 ===
- Vladimir Nabokov, 78, Russian and American novelist, poet, translator, and entomologist, his work had multiple nominations for the Nobel Prize in Literature, during the 1940s, as a research fellow in zoology, Nabokov was responsible for organizing the butterfly collection of Harvard University's Museum of Comparative Zoology, he published 18 scientific articles on lepidoptery and named 12 valid species and genera,throughout his life, Nabokov would remain committed to the classical liberal political philosophy of his father, and he equally opposed Tsarist autocracy, communism, and fascism,death caused by bronchitis.

=== 21 ===
- Lee Miller, 70, American photographer, photojournalist, and fashion model, during World War II, Miller was a war photographer and war correspondent for the magazine Vogue, covering events such as the London Blitz, the liberation of Paris and the concentration camps at Buchenwald and Dachau,Miller was investigated by the British security service MI5 during the 1940s and the 1950s, on suspicion of being a Soviet spy,death caused by pancreatic cancer.
- John Robert Powers, 84, American talent agent and modeling agent, he was the eponymous founder of the John Robert Powers Agency which has since transformed from a modeling school to a school focused on personality development all throughout East Asia and Southeast Asia, specifically countries such as China, Indonesia, the Philippines, and Thailand,Michele Carey, Betty Ford, and Grace Kelly worked as models for Powers' JRP agency, as did Kim Basinger's mother Ann Cordell, the 10th anniversary issue of Life described the then 11-year-old Nancy Malone (née Maloney) as one of the most successful young "Powers models".

=== 22 ===
- Erik Chitty, 70, English actor and genealogist,his television credits included a major role as the aged Mr Smith in the sitcom Please Sir!, and multiple appearances in Dad's Army, Raffles, Doctor Who, Danger Man, Maigret, Man About the House and The Goodies.

=== 29 ===
- David Lochary, 32, American actor, primarily remembered as a member of John Waters' cast and crew of Dreamlanders,death caused by an overdose of phencyclidine (PCP, angel dust)..

== Sources ==
- Boyd, Brian (1990). Vladimir Nabokov: The Russian Years. Princeton, N.J.: Princeton University Press. ISBN 0-691-06794-5. (hardback) 1997. ISBN 0-691-02470-7 (paperback). London: Chatto & Windus, 1990. ISBN 0-7011-3700-2 (hardback)
