= Deaths in December 1982 =

The following is a list of notable deaths in December 1982.

Entries for each day are listed alphabetically by surname. A typical entry lists information in the following sequence:

- Name, age, country of citizenship at birth, subsequent country of citizenship (if applicable), reason for notability, cause of death (if known), and reference.

== December 1982 ==
=== 2 ===
- David Blue, 41, American folk music singer-songwriter and actor, heart attack while jogging
- Marty Feldman, 48, British actor, comedian and writer, heart attack

=== 7 ===
- Will Lee, 74, American actor, played the character Mr. Hooper on the educational children's television series Sesame Street, heart attack
- Sam Theard, 78, American singer, songwriter, actor and comedian, writer of the song You Rascal You (1929), complications from a stroke
- Dave Torbert, 34, American musician

=== 8 ===
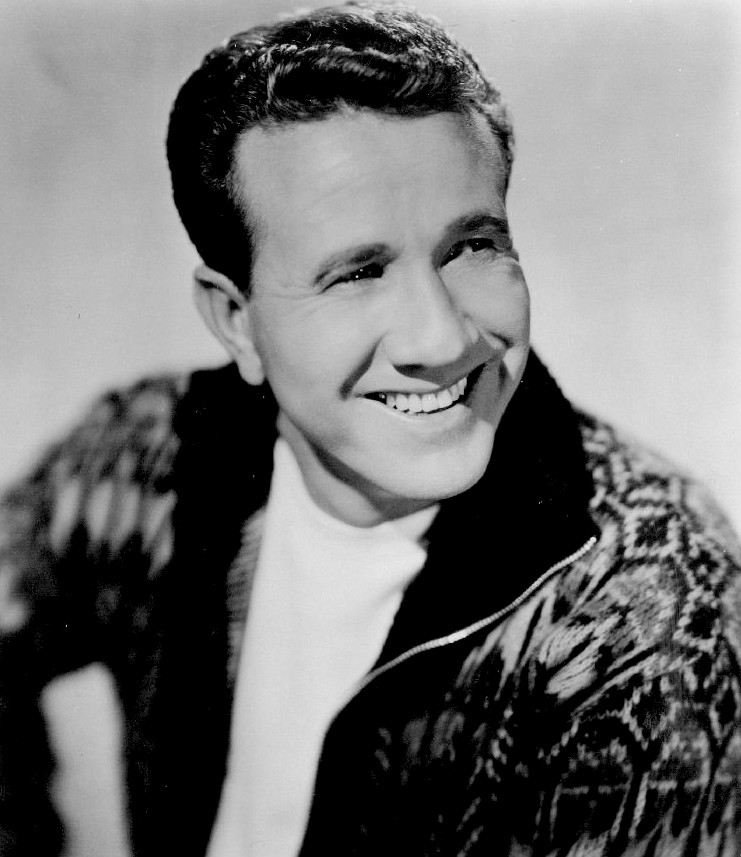
Marty Robbins

- Encarnación Fuyola, 75, Spanish teacher, Communist activist and propagandist
- Marty Robbins, 57, American country and western singer and songwriter, pioneer of the subgenre outlaw country, complications from his third heart attack and a subsequent quadruple coronary artery bypass surgery

=== 9 ===
- Joey Forman, 53, American comedian and actor, pulmonary fibrosis.
- Silvia Pinto, 45, Chilean journalist and politician, deputy (1973), plane crash.

=== 10 ===
- Freeman Gosden, 83, American comedian and actor, pioneer in the development of the sitcom genre, co-creator of the radio sitcom Amos 'n' Andy,congestive heart failure

=== 11 ===
- Worthington Miner, 82, American film producer, director, screenwriter, and actor

=== 16 ===
- Colin Chapman, 54, English design engineer, inventor, and builder in the automotive industry, founder of the sports car company Lotus Cars, heart attack

=== 17 ===
- Homer S. Ferguson, 93, American politician, ambassador, and judge, he served as a United States senator from Michigan from 1943 until 1955
- Big Joe Williams, 79, American Delta blues guitarist, singer, and songwriter

=== 18 ===
- Hans-Ulrich Rudel, 66, German ground-attack pilot during World War II, neo-Nazi political activist and arms dealer in the post-war period, leading member of the Neo-Nazi party German Reich Party (Deutsche Reichspartei or DRP), stroke

=== 19 ===
- Andy Anderson, 77, African-American jazz trumpeter
- Frederick Terman, 82, American professor and academic administrator, he spearheaded the creation of the Stanford Research Park in 1951, and he is credited as the founding father of the Silicon Valley

=== 20 ===
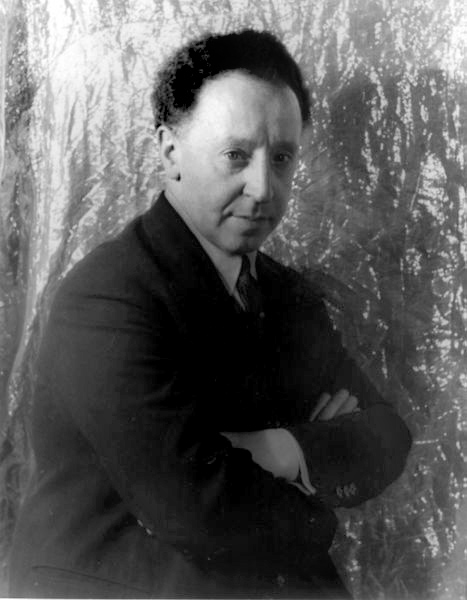
Arthur Rubinstein

- Arthur Rubinstein, 95, Polish pianist, died in his sleep

=== 21 ===
- Charles Hapgood, 78, American college professor and writer, promoted the cataclysmic pole shift hypothesis
- Tomaž Hostnik, member of the band Laibach

=== 23 ===
- Gino Corrado, 89, Italian character actor and restaurateur, he played Aramis in The Iron Mask (1929)

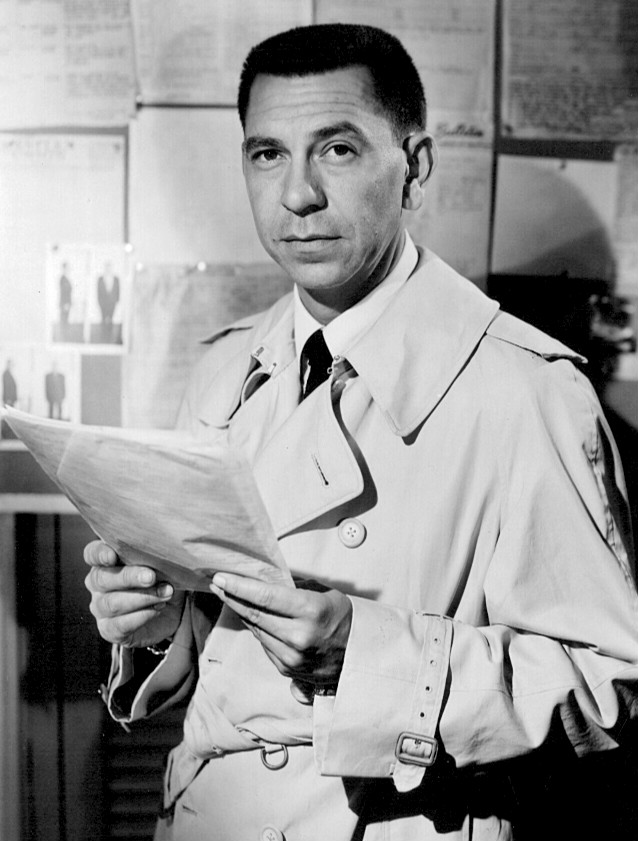
Jack Webb

- Jack Webb, 62, American actor, television producer, director, and screenwriter, creator of the media franchise Dragnet and founder of the production company Mark VII Limited, heart attack.

=== 24 ===
- Louis Aragon, 85, French poet, novelist, and editor, among the leading figures of the surrealist movement in France

=== 25 ===
- Helen Foster, 76, American actress, named a WAMPAS Baby Star in 1929

=== 27 ===
- Jack Swigert, 51, American NASA astronaut, test pilot, mechanical engineer, aerospace engineer, United States Air Force pilot, and politician, command module pilot of Apollo 13, one of the 24 astronauts who flew to the Moon, respiratory failure

=== 28 ===
- Louise Stanley, 67, American actress, cancer

=== 29 ===
- Sol C. Siegel, 79, American film producer, head of studio operations and vice president in charge of production in the film studio Metro-Goldwyn-Mayer from 1958 until 1962, heart attack

=== 30 ===
- Giuseppe Aquari, 66, Italian cinematographer, died shortly before undergoing a major surgery intended to deal with his health problems

=== 31 ===
- John Collins, 77, English Anglican priest and political activist, founder of the inter-church movement Christian Action, anti-apartheid activist

== Sources ==
- Beeson, Trevor (October 4, 2008). "Collins, (Lewis) John". Oxford Dictionary of National Biography (online ed.). Oxford University Press. doi:10.1093/ref:odnb/30954. (Subscription, Wikipedia Library access or UK public library membership required.)
- Chaikin, Andrew (1998). A Man on the Moon. Penguin Books Ltd. ISBN 978-0-14-024146-4.
- Gérard ('Jabby') Crombac, Colin Chapman: The Man and His Cars (Patrick Stephens, Wellingborough, 1986) ISBN 1-85960-844-2
- Gikow, Louise A. (2009). Sesame Street: A Celebration— Forty Years of Life on the Street. New York: Black Dog & Leventhal Publishers. ISBN 978-1-57912-638-4.
- Hamilton, Charles (1996). Leaders & Personalities of the Third Reich, Vol. 2. R. James Bender Publishing. ISBN 978-0-912138-66-4.
- "Fuyola Miret, Encarnación". Parque de la Memoria. Archived from the original on April 2, 2015.
- "Hans-Ulrich Rudel". Der Spiegel (in German) (52). 1982. ISSN 0038-7452. Archived from the original on March 1, 2021.
- "Letzter Flug" [Last Flight]. Der Spiegel (in German) (1). 1983. ISSN 0038-7452.
