= Deaths in December 1983 =

The following is a list of notable deaths in December 1983.

Entries for each day are listed alphabetically by surname. A typical entry lists information in the following sequence:

- Name, age, country of citizenship at birth, subsequent country of citizenship (if applicable), reason for notability, cause of death (if known), and reference.

== December 1983 ==
=== 2 ===
- Fifi D'Orsay, 79, Canadian-American actress and singer, cancer

=== 5 ===
- John Robinson, 64, English New Testament scholar, Anglican Bishop of Woolwich, lecturer at Trinity College, Cambridge, and later Dean of Chapel at Trinity College, cancer

=== 6 ===
- Gul Khan Nasir, 69, Pakistani politician, historian, and journalist, lung cancer

=== 7 ===
- Fanny Cano, 39, Mexican actress and producer, one of the passengers killed in the 1983 Madrid Airport runway collision
- Antal Molnár, Hungarian musicologist, violist, composer, and music educator. "One of the founders of modern Hungarian musicology".
- Marc Raubenheimer, 31, South African pianist, winner of the 1982 version of the Paloma O'Shea International Piano Competition, one of the passengers killed in the 1983 Madrid Airport runway collision

=== 8 ===
- Keith Holyoake, 79, New Zealand politician, Governor-General of New Zealand (term 1977-1980) and Prime Minister of New Zealand (terms 1957, 1960–1972)

=== 9 ===
- David Rounds, 53, American actor, cancer

=== 10 ===
- Nicolay Aarestrup, 85, Norwegian businessperson, former chief executive officer of Hygea

=== 11 ===
- Neil Ritchie, 86, British military officer and businessperson, veteran of both world wars, the 1936–1939 Arab revolt in Palestine, and the Malayan Emergency

=== 13 ===
- Leora Dana, 60, American actress, cancer
- Mary Renault, 78, British historical novelist whose work focused on Ancient Greece, lung cancer and pneumonia

=== 15 ===
- Eden Hartford, 53, American actress, endometrial cancer

=== 19 ===
- Alan Dexter, 65, American actor, heart attack

=== 20 ===
- John Vivyan, 68, American actor, heart failure

=== 21 ===
- Rod Cameron, 73, Canadian actor, cancer

=== 22 ===
- Charles Lloyd-Pack, 81, British actor

=== 24 ===
- Paul Gégauff, 61, French screenwriter, winner of an Edgar Award, mariticide, fatally stabbed by his second wife

=== 25 ===
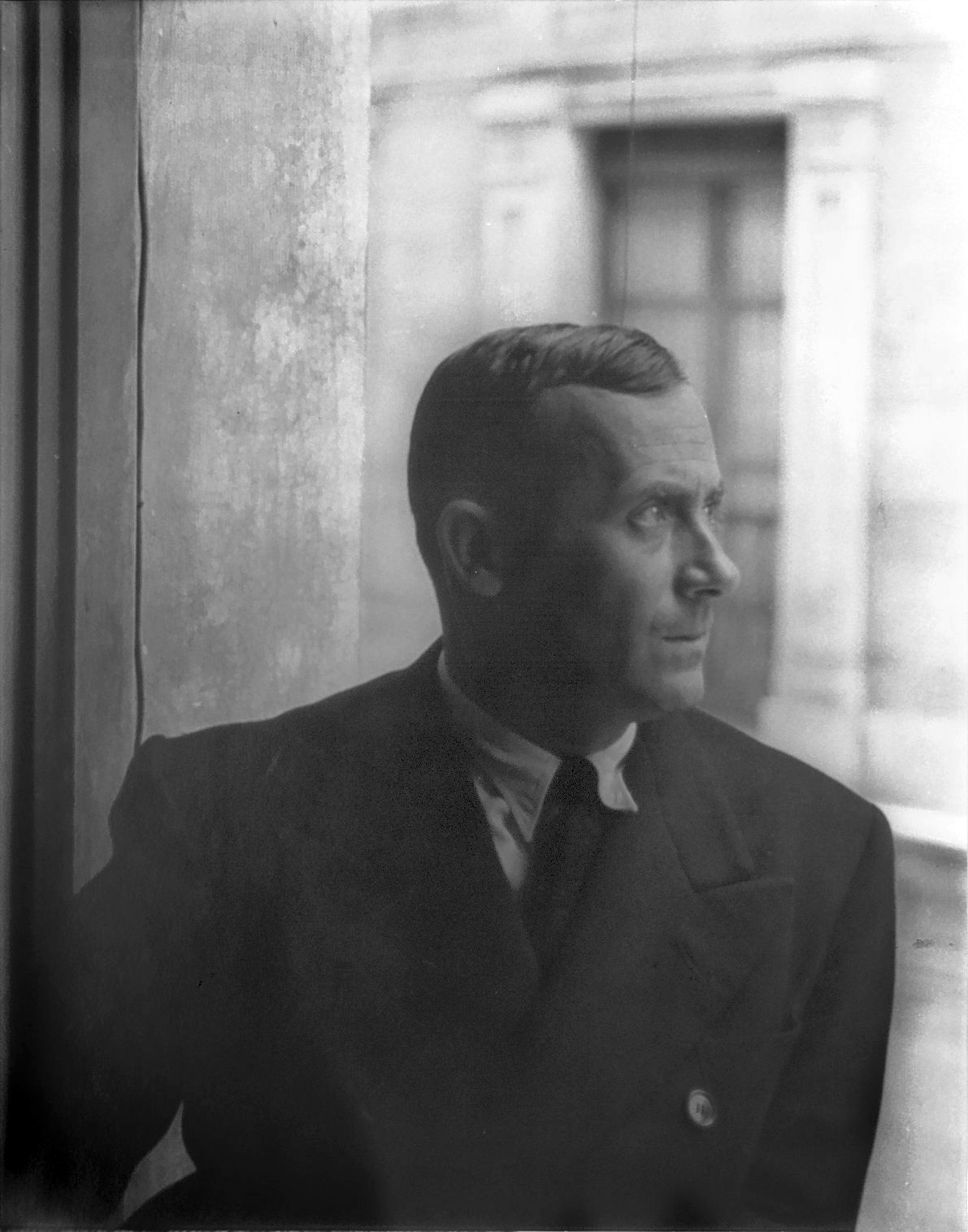
Joan Miró

- Joan Miró, 90, Catalan painter, sculptor and ceramist, representative of Surrealism, Fauvism, and Expressionism,heart failure

=== 26 ===
- Violet Carson, 85, British actress, singer, and pianist, heart failure

=== 28 ===
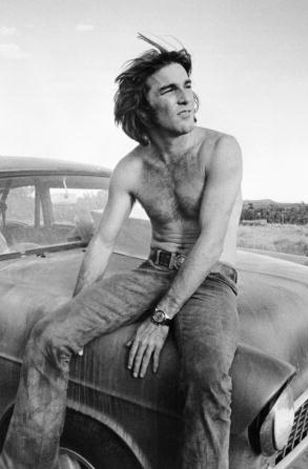
Dennis Wilson

- William Demarest, 91, American actor
- Jimmy Demaret, 73, American professional golfer, heart attack
- Dennis Wilson, 39, American drummer, singer, and songwriter, co-founder of the rock band The Beach Boys, associate and landlord of the commune Manson Family, drowned as a probable result of shallow-water blackout

=== 29 ===
- Lloyd Ahern, 78, American cinematographer, complications from strokes.

== Sources ==
- Badman, Keith (2004). The Beach Boys: The Definitive Diary of America's Greatest Band, on Stage and in the Studio. Backbeat Books. ISBN 978-0-87930-818-6.
- Sweetman, David (1993). Mary Renault: A Biography. London: Chatto & Windus. ISBN 0-7011-3568-9.
- Who Was Who 1981-1990: A Companion to Who's Who Containing the Biographies of Those Who Died During the Decade 1981-1990. Vol. 8. London: A. & C. Black. 1991. ISBN 978-0-7136-3336-8. OCLC 26303805.
