= Deaths in April 1983 =

The following is a list of notable deaths in April 1983.

Entries for each day are listed alphabetically by surname. A typical entry lists information in the following sequence:

- Name, age, country of citizenship at birth, subsequent country of citizenship (if applicable), reason for notability, cause of death (if known), and reference.

== April 1983 ==
=== 1 ===
- John R. Buckmaster, 67, English actor and cabaret singer-songwriter, suicide at the end of 23 years of confinement at the Priory Hospital

=== 3 ===
- Jimmy Bloomfield, 49, English football player and manager, he served as the manager of Orient from 1968 until 1971, and again from 1977 until 1981, and as the manager of Leicester City from 1971 until 1977, cancer

=== 4 ===
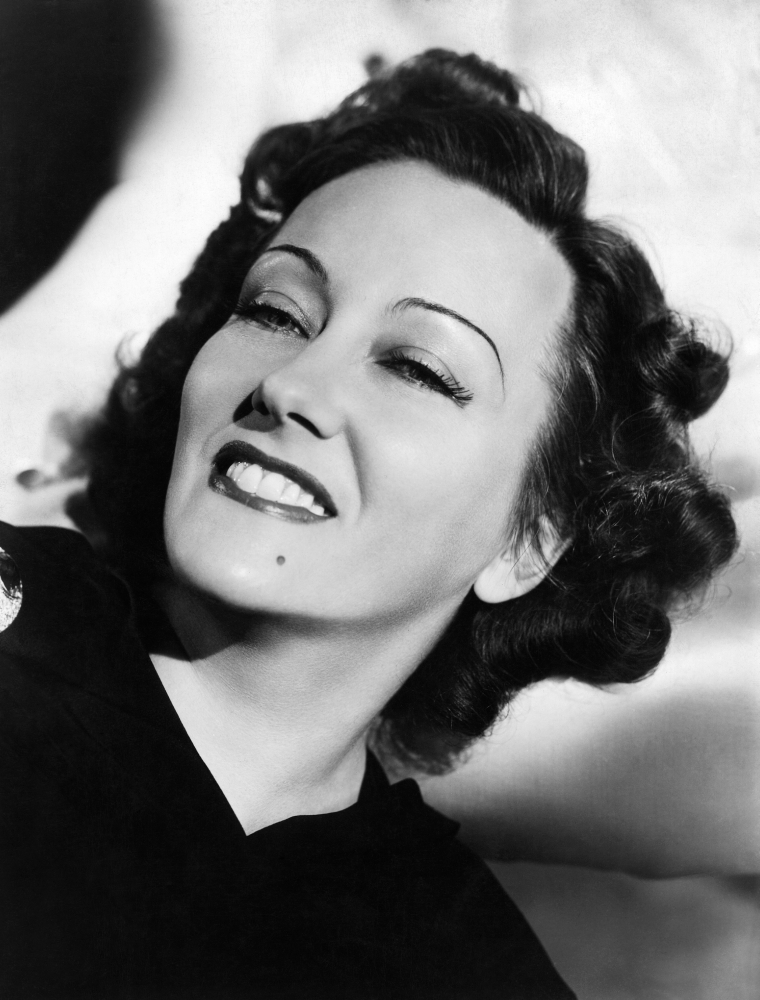
Gloria Swanson

- Jacqueline Logan, 80, American actress, screenwriter, and film director, named a WAMPAS Baby Star of 1922.
- Gloria Swanson, 84, American actress, heart disease

=== 6 ===
- Christopher Rule, 88, American comic book artist, he served as the first regular Marvel Comics inker for the artwork of Jack Kirby during the Silver Age of Comic Books, he was previously a staff artist for Timely Comics during the Golden Age of Comic Books

=== 7 ===
- Gavin Gordon, 82, American actor
- Kenyon Hopkins, 71, American film composer and arranger, representative of the jazz music tradition

=== 11 ===
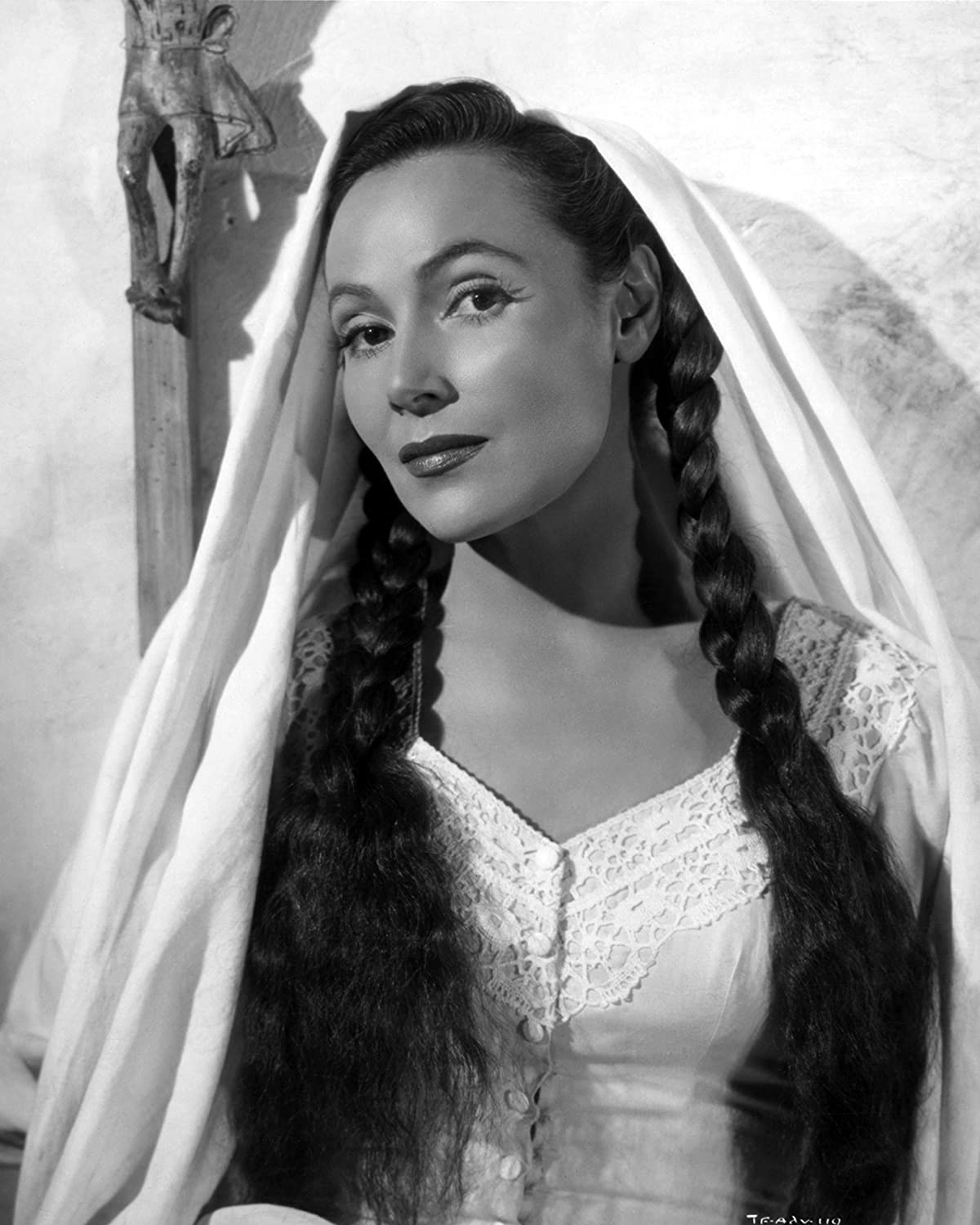
Dolores del Río

- Dolores del Río, 78, Mexican actress, one of the most important female figures in the Golden Age of Mexican cinema, famed in American cinema for portraying a feminine version of the Latin lover,liver failure

=== 12 ===
- Desmond Bagley, 59, English journalist and novelist, he specialized in writing thrillers and he is credited with setting the genre's conventions, complications from a stroke
- Jørgen Juve, 76, Norwegian football player, jurist, journalist, and non-fiction writer, minor ballot candidate for the Liberal Party in the 1949 Norwegian parliamentary election

=== 13 ===
- Gloria Marín, 63, Mexican actress, emphysema

=== 14 ===
- Elisabeth Lutyens, 76, English composer and autobiographer

=== 15 ===
- Corrie ten Boom, 91, Dutch watchmaker, Christian writer and autobiographer, public speaker, former prisoner in the Ravensbrück concentration camp,stroke
- Rodolfo Hoyos Jr., 67, Mexican-American actor
- Ernestine Wade, 76, American actress, portrayed Sapphire Stevens on both the radio and TV versions of The Amos 'n' Andy Show

=== 17 ===
- Siegfried Müller, 62, German-born soldier and mercenary, he was an officer-candidate in the Wehrmacht during World War II and a commander in the 5 Commando during the Congo Crisis,stomach cancer
- Felix Pappalardi, 43, American music producer, songwriter, vocalist, and bassist, he served as the bassist and co-lead vocalist of the hard rock band Mountain, shot and killed by his own wife, Gail Collins Pappalardi

=== 21 ===
- Walter Slezak, 80, Austrian actor, suicide by firearm while suffering from a series of health problems, including heart and prostate ailments, and a shoulder injury

=== 22 ===
- Earl Hines, 79, American jazz pianist and bandleader, heart attack
- Lamberto Maggiorani, 73, Italian actor

=== 23 ===
- Anita Blanch, 72, Spanish-born Mexican actress, member of the activist group Rosa Mexicano, which requested protection for actresses and their children, and the formation of nurseries for the children of actresses
- Buster Crabbe, 75, American Olympic swimmer and actor, he portrayed in film adaptations the top three syndicated comic-strip heroes of the 1930s: Tarzan, Flash Gordon, and Buck Rogers, heart attack
- Suzanne La Follette, 89, American journalist, magazine editor, and advocate for libertarian feminism
- Selena Royle, 78, American actress, cookbook writer, writer and editor for magazines

=== 25 ===
- Jack Ritchie, 61, American crime fiction writer, primarily a short story writer, he published well over 500 stories during his career,heart attack
- Saloma, 48, Singaporean-Malaysian singer, actress, and fashion icon, liver failure associated with jaundice

=== 26 ===
- Henrietta Buckmaster, 74, American activist, journalist, and author
- Shirley Deane, 70, American actress, portrayed Princess Aura in the third Flash Gordon serial, Flash Gordon Conquers the Universe, cancer
- Bronisław Kaper, 81, Polish film composer, worked in the theater and the film industries of France, Germany, and the United States, co-wrote the jazz standard "All God's Chillun Got Rhythm"
- Vaughn Taylor, 73, American actor, cerebral hemorrhage

=== 30 ===
- George Balanchine, 79, Georgian-American ballet choreographer, recognized as one of the most influential choreographers of the 20th century,
- Jerry Fujikawa, 71, American actor and veteran of World War II, having taken part in military operations in Italy and France
- Muddy Waters, 70, American blues singer-songwriter and bandleader, regarded as the founding father of the music genre of Chicago blues, heart failure and cancer-related complications

== Sources ==
- Bunnenberg, Christian (2007). Der "Kongo-Müller" : eine deutsche Söldnerkarriere. Berlin: Lit. ISBN 9783825899004.
- Doerschuk, Robert L. (2001), 88: The Giants of Jazz Piano, San Francisco: Backbeat Books, ISBN 0-87930-656-4.
- Hall, Linda (2013). Dolores del Río: Beauty in Light and Shade (1st ed.). Redwood City, California: Stanford University Press. ISBN 978-0-8047-8621-8.
- Morley, Sheridan (1979). Gladys Cooper : A Biography (hardcover). London: Heinemann. ISBN 978-0-434-47896-5.
- Vickers, Hugo (1990) [First published 1988]. Vivien Leigh (softcover). London: Pan Macmillan. ISBN 978-0-330-31166-3.
- Zolov, Eric (2015). Iconic Mexico: An Encyclopedia from Acapulco to Zócalo. New York: ABC-CLIO. ISBN 978-1-61069-044-7.
