= Deaths in September 1983 =

The following is a list of notable deaths in September 1983.

Entries for each day are listed alphabetically by surname. A typical entry lists information in the following sequence:

- Name, age, country of citizenship at birth, subsequent country of citizenship (if applicable), reason for notability, cause of death (if known), and reference.

== September 1983 ==
=== 1 ===
- Henry M. Jackson, 71, American lawyer and politician, he represented Washington's 2nd congressional district from 1941 until 1953, he served as a senator from Washington from 1953 until his death in 1983, he led two failed presidential campaigns in 1972 and 1976, he suffered a heart attack a few hours after his final news conference
- Larry McDonald, 48, American physician and politician, member of the United States House of Representatives (since 1975), murdered.

=== 4 ===
- Jon Brower Minnoch, 41, American taxi driver and owner of his own taxi company, cardiac arrest, with respiratory failure and restrictive lung disease as contributing factors, considered the heaviest recorded human in history, weighing approximately 1,400 lb (635 kilograms; 100 stone) at his peak.

=== 5 ===
- Ken Carter, 44–45, Canadian stunt driver, killed in a failed stunt with a rocket-powered car, when his car overshot its target
- John Gilpin, 53, English ballet dancer and actor, heart attack
- Yale Gracey, 73, American layout artist, special effects designer, and Disney Imagineer, he designed many of the special effects for the Pirates of the Caribbean and Haunted Mansion attractions at Disneyland, murdered in his sleep by an unidentified intruder in his cabana
- Lloyd Piper, 59, Australian cartoonist and art teacher, served as a graphic design teacher at the National Art School from 1970 until 1983, died in a car accident

=== 7 ===
- Georgia Backus, 81, American character actress, writer, director and producer of radio dramas, dramatic director of the Columbia Broadcasting System

=== 8 ===
- Ibrahim Abboud, 82, Sudanese military officer and political figure, he served as the head of state of Sudan between 1958 and 1964, and briefly as President of Sudan in 1964, veteran of World War II in Egypt and Iraq.

=== 10 ===
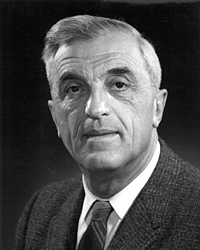
Felix Bloch

- Felix Bloch, 77, Swiss-American theoretical physicist,, CERN's first director-general
- John Vorster, 67, prime minister and state president of South Africa.

=== 11 ===
- John Ducey, 75, Canadian baseball executive and umpire, inductee of the Canadian Baseball Hall of Fame and Alberta Sports Hall of Fame
- Brian Lawrance, 74, Australian singer, violinist, and bandleader, considered one of the leading British dance band vocalists of the 1930s, who drew a large radio audience

=== 12 ===
- Ranjan, 65, Indian actor, singer, and journalist, cardiac arrest

=== 14 ===
- Robert C. Dennis, 67, Canadian-born American pulp fiction writer, scriptwriter for both radio and television, co-created the character King Tut for the television series Batman

=== 15 ===
- Johnny Hartman, 60, American jazz singer, lung cancer
- Beverley Nichols, 85, English playwright, mystery writer, and non-fiction writer on the topics of house maintenance and gardening
- LeRoy Prinz, 88, American choreographer, director, and producer, directed dance sequences for dozens of films for Paramount Pictures between 1933 and 1941, when he left to become the dance director of Warner Brothers, he staged all of Warner's musical sequences for 16 years, he worked on over 150 films as a choreographer

=== 16 ===
- Danny Webb, 77, American voice actor, comedian, and vaudeville performer, served as the voice of the animated characters Egghead, Elmer Fudd, Goofy, and Woody Woodpecker, assistant producer for NBC's Wide Wide World

=== 17 ===
- Humberto Sousa Medeiros, 67, Portuguese-American cleric of the Roman Catholic Church, Archbishop of Boston from 1970 until his death in 1983, a cardinal since 1973, heart failure during open heart surgery

=== 21 ===
- Birgit Tengroth, 68, Swedish actress

=== 25 ===
- Jim O'Brien, 43, American newscaster, sports anchor and weather reporter, killed in a skydiving accident caused by a collision with another skydiver

=== 26 ===
- Tino Rossi, 76, French actor and singer

=== 29 ===
- Alan Moorehead, 73, Australian war correspondent in World War II, popular historian, and biographer, first recipient of the Duff Cooper Memorial Award for his book on the Gallipoli campaign (1915–1916)

=== 30 ===
- William Elliott, 49, American actor and jazz musician, heart attack
- Freddy Martin, 76, American bandleader and tenor saxophonist, stroke
