= Deaths in November 1977 =

The following is a list of notable deaths in November 1977. Entries for each day are listed alphabetically by surname. A typical entry lists information in the following sequence:

- Name, age, country of citizenship at birth, subsequent country of citizenship (if applicable), reason for notability, cause of death (if known), and reference.

== November 1977 ==
=== 2 ===
- Harold E. Stine, 74, American cinematographer, sound engineer, visual effects artist and cameraman,while working for RKO Pictures, he filmed the rear projection for Mighty Joe Young (1949) and The Thing from Another World (1951),he was nominated for the Academy Award for Best Cinematography for his work on the disaster film The Poseidon Adventure (1972).

=== 3 ===
- Florence Vidor, 82, American silent film actress,her career ended with the advent of sound films, in 1929, she became so frustrated by the difficulties of making the partial sound film Chinatown Nights that she retired from acting before the production was completed, the film's director William A. Wellman had to use a voice double to complete some of her scenes.

=== 5 ===
- René Goscinny, 51, French comics writer and magazine editor, he co-created the comics series Asterix and Oumpah-pah with his partner Albert Uderzo,he served as the main writer of Lucky Luke from 1955 until his death in 1977,he co-created Iznogoud with his collaborator Jean Tabary, he co-created the children's book series Le Petit Nicolas, which he initially wrote in short story form,death caused by a sudden heart attack, which took place during a routine stress test at a doctor's office.
- Guy Lombardo, 75, Canadian and American bandleader, violinist, and hydroplane racer, the total sales from Lombardo's recordings exceeded 300 million copies by the early 1970s and supported his reputation as the leader of the most popular dance band of his era,Lombardo is perhaps best remembered for his big band remote broadcasts which were carried on several national radio and television networks for nearly fifty years;, starting in 1929, Lombardo's Royal Canadians began broadcasting live from the Roosevelt Grill in the Roosevelt Hotel in Midtown Manhattan as "radio's first nationwide New Year's Eve broadcast", invariably, each broadcast closed with Lombardo's rendition of the song "Auld Lang Syne" (1788) as part of the annual New Year's Eve tradition,death caused by a heart attackwhile Lombardo was already hospitalized. A spokesman from the hospital attributed the death to "respiratory insufficiency" relating to a pulmonary problem.

=== 8 ===
- Ted Ray, 71, English comedian, he played comedy roles in several British films—notably appearing as the headmaster in Carry On Teacher (1959), he is best remembered for his starring role in the BBC Radio show Ray's a Laugh (1949-1961),death caused by a heart attack.

=== 9 ===
- Gertrude Astor, 90, American character actress and trombonist,she was a tall, angular and beautiful woman, who frequently towered over the leading men of her era; she was frequently utilized in comedy roles, portraying aristocrats, gold-diggers, and the "heroine's best pal",death caused by a stroke.

=== 10 ===
- Dennis Wheatley, 80, English writer,his prolific output of thrillers and occult novels made him one of the world's best-selling authors from the 1930s until the 1960s,Wheatley's work reflects his conservative worldview, his protagonists are generally supporters of the British monarchy, the British Empire and the British class system, and many of his villains are villainous because they attack these ideas, Wheatley was an opponent of both Nazism and Communism, believing them to be controlled by Satanic power,Wheatley's Gregory Sallust series has been cited as an inspiration for Ian Fleming's James Bond stories.

=== 13 ===
- Shirō Toyoda, 71, Japanese film director and screenwriter,he directed over 60 films during his career which spanned 50 years,he was denoted for his high-quality adaptations of works by many important twentieth-century Japanese writers.

=== 14 ===
- Richard Addinsell, 73, English composer, working as a film composer for decades,Addinsell's first film score of the 1940s was the one composed for the psychological thriller Gaslight (1940), an adaptation of Patrick Hamilton's 1938 stage play Gas Light.
- A. C. Bhaktivedanta Swami Prabhupada, 81, Indian spiritual, philosophical, and religious teacher, in July 1966, Prabhupada incorporated the International Society for Krishna Consciousness (ISKCON), death after an unspecified "long illness", with some sources attributing the death to diabetes. (Note: Eastern mysteries (1991) cites "diabetes and complications following a stroke" as the cause of Prabhupada's death.)

=== 21 ===
- Lester Koenig, 59, American screenwriter, film producer, and founder of the jazz record label Contemporary Records, in the early 1950s, Koenig was blacklisted by the House Un-American Activities Committee, and consequently some of his production credits were excised, death caused by a heart attack.

=== 22 ===
- George Mann, 71, American vaudevillian,he rose to fame as part of the double act Barto and Mann, following a successful performance at the Palace Theatre in March 1927, the duo received offers from all the major vaudeville circuits, ;they chose to sign with the Orpheum Circuit, with whom they toured across the United States until they signed with the Earl Carroll's Vanities from August 1928 to February 1929, in the early 1970s, Mann was hired by Quaker Oats to portray King Vitaman in commercials and on the front of the King Vitaman cereal box.

=== 25 ===
- Richard Carlson, 65, American actor, film director, and screenwriter, he was the director of the science fiction film Riders to the Stars (1954),which was later adapted into the television series Men Into Space (1959),death caused by cerebral hemorrhage

=== 26 ===
- Alexey Gribov, 75, Soviet actor and pedagogue of the Moscow Art Theatre, he was named People's Artist of the USSR in 1948, Hero of Socialist Labour in 1972 and awarded four Stalin Prizes (1942, 1946, 1951 and 1952).

=== 30 ===
- Olga Petrova, 93, British-American actress, screenwriter, and playwright,she presented herself to the public as a glamorous Russian or Polish actress, she made her first notable appearance under her Russian pseudonym at the London Pavilion in April 1911, and her success led to her being quickly signed up for the Folies-Bergere cabaret in New York City,she eventually set up her own film company and wrote for a number of periodicals,she starred in a number of films for Solax Studios and Metro Pictures, where she was usually given the role of a femme fatale,; during her seven years in film, Petrova appeared in more than two dozen films and wrote the script for several others, most of her films are now lost, including what she considered her best pictures, those directed by Maurice Tourneur.
- Terence Rattigan, 66, British dramatist and screenwriter, Rattigan was a troubled gay man who saw himself as an outsider, he wrote a number of plays which centred on the issues of sexual frustration, failed relationships, and a world of repression and reticence.

== Sources ==
- Doyle, Robert A. (1991), "3", Easter Mysteries, Alexandria, VA: Time-Life Books, pp. 114–142, ISBN 978-0-8094-6504-0
- Jones, Constance A. (2007), Encyclopedia of Hinduism, New York: Infobase Publishing, pp. 77–78, ISBN 978-0-8160-5458-9
- Ketola, Kimmo (2008), The Founder of the Hare Krishnas as Seen by Devotees: A Cognitive Study of Religious Charisma, Numen, vol. 120, Leiden: Brill, ISBN 978-9-0474-3326-2
- New York Times (November 16, 1977), "Swami Prabhupada, 'Hare Krishna', Dead", The New York Times, p. 2
- Rochford, E. Burke (2007), Hare Krishna Transformed, The New and Alternative Religions Series, New York, NY: New York University Press, ISBN 978-0-8147-7579-0
- Westfahl, Gary. The Spacesuit Film: A History, 1918-1969. Jefferson, North Carolina: McFarland & Company, 2012. ISBN 978-0-7864-4267-6.
