= Deaths in February 1983 =

The following is a list of notable deaths in February 1983.

Entries for each day are listed alphabetically by surname. A typical entry lists information in the following sequence:

- Name, age, country of citizenship at birth, subsequent country of citizenship (if applicable), reason for notability, cause of death (if known), and reference.

== February 1983 ==
=== 1 ===
- Elena Fiore, 68, Italian actress

=== 3 ===
- Josephine Dunn, 76, American actress, cancer

=== 4 ===
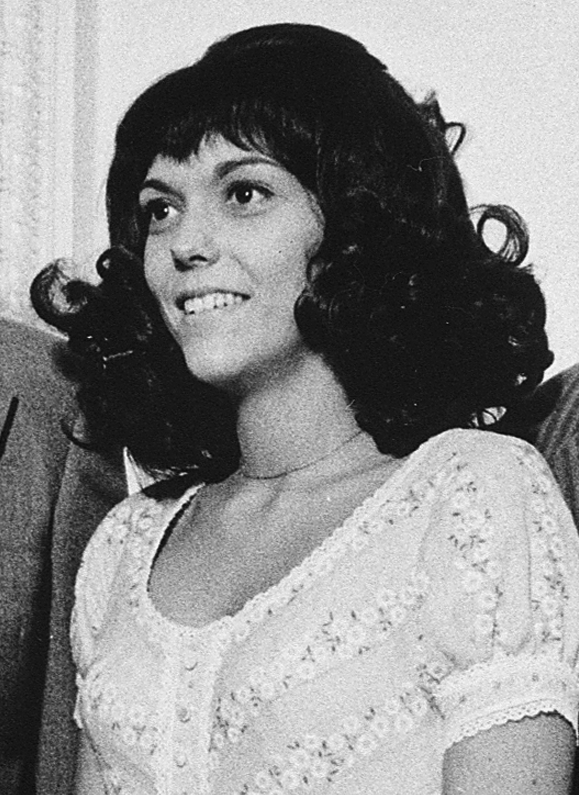
Karen Carpenter

- Jim Ameche, 67, American actor, lung cancer
- Karen Carpenter, 32, American musician, she served as the lead vocalist and the drummer of the sibling duo the Carpenters, death from cardiac arrest, officially attributed to "emetine cardiotoxicity due to or as a consequence of anorexia nervosa"
- Reginald Denham, 89, English playwright, screenwriter, theatre and film director, actor and film producer, stroke

=== 6 ===
- Eben Bartlett, 70, American army officer and politician

=== 8 ===
- Charlotte Francis, 79, English actress and playwright

=== 9 ===
- Zinaida Semyonovna Brumberg, 82, Soviet animation director, animator, and screenwriter, one of the pioneers of the Soviet animation industry

=== 10 ===
- Eduard Franz, 80, American actor

=== 11 ===
- Max Ehrlich, 73, American writer.

=== 12 ===
- Eubie Blake, 96, American pianist and composer of ragtime, jazz, and popular music, pneumonia

=== 13 ===
- Marian Nixon, 78, American actress, identified as a WAMPAS Baby Star in 1924, post-surgery complications following an open heart surgery

=== 16 ===
- Florence Hall, 94, American civil servant who was chief of the Women's Land Army

=== 19 ===
- Charles Bluhdorn, 56, Austrian-born American industrialist, owner of the conglomerate Gulf and Western Industries and chairman of its subsidiary film studio Paramount Pictures, heart attack
- Alice White, 78, American actress, complications from a stroke

=== 20 ===
- Caryl Lincoln, 79, American actress, she was selected as a WAMPAS Baby Star in 1929
- Ray Vitte, 33, American actor, death from sickle cell disease while held in police custody

=== 22 ===
- Sir Adrian Boult, 93, British conductor, founder and chief conductor of the BBC Symphony Orchestra, director of music for the BBC
- Georg Rydeberg, 75, Swedish actor

=== 23 ===
- Herbert Howells, 90, English composer, organist, and teacher, known for his large output of Anglican church music

=== 24 ===
- Roy Krenkel, 64, American illustrator, specialist in fantasy and historical drawings and paintings

=== 25 ===
- Mignon Anderson, 90, American actress.
- Tennessee Williams, 71, American playwright and screenwriter, death from a toxic level of secobarbital while ingesting barbiturates

=== 27 ===
- Nikolai Aleksandrovich Kozyrev, 74, Soviet astronomer and astrophysicist, primarily known for his 1958 observation of the transient lunar phenomenon in the crater Alphonsus on the Moon

=== 28 ===
- Winifred Atwell, c. 73, Trinidad and Tobago-born British composer and pianist, known for a series of boogie-woogie and ragtime hits, selling over 20 million records

=== Specific date unknown ===
- Helen Ogger, 73, American inker and cartoonist, worked in the Ink and Paint Department of the Walt Disney Animation Studios throughout the 1930s, she applied the dye used for Snow White's blush

== Sources ==
- Kennedy, Michael (1987). Adrian Boult. London: Hamish Hamilton. ISBN 0-333-48752-4.
- Lahr, John. Tennessee Williams: Mad Pilgrimage of the Flesh. W. W. Norton & Co. New York. Print. 2014. ISBN 978-0-393-02124-0.
- Liebman, Roy (2000). The Wampas Baby Stars: A Biographical Dictionary, 1922–1934. Jefferson, North Carolina: McFarland. ISBN 0-7864-0756-5.
