= Deaths in June 1983 =

The following is a list of notable deaths in June 1983.

Entries for each day are listed alphabetically by surname. A typical entry lists information in the following sequence:

- Name, age, country of citizenship at birth, subsequent country of citizenship (if applicable), reason for notability, cause of death (if known), and reference.

== June 1983 ==
=== 1 ===
- Ernest Graves, 64, American actor, cancer
- Anna Seghers, 82, German writer, repeatedly nominated for the Nobel Prize in Literature in 1959, 1967, 1968, 1969 and 1972.

=== 2 ===
- Stan Rogers, 33, Canadian folk musician and songwriter, smoke inhalation, one of the victims of the fire in Air Canada Flight 797

=== 3 ===
- John Trent, 48, British-born Canadian film director and producer, killed in a car accident involving a head-on collision with a police car

=== 4 ===
- Daniele Amfitheatrof, 81, Russian, American, and Italian composer and conductor
- Ivan Tors, 66, Hungarian playwright, film director, screenwriter, film producer, and television producer, heart attack

=== 8 ===
- Miško Kranjec, 74, Slovene writer
- Jacques Van Melkebeke, 78, Belgian painter, journalist, comic strip writer, and playwright, first chief editor of the Tintin magazine, one of the main sources of inspiration for the Blake and Mortimer character Philip Angus Mortimer

=== 10 ===
- Larry Hooper, 66, American singer and pianist, member of Lawrence Welk's band, kidney failure

=== 12 ===
- Norma Shearer, 80, Canadian-American actress, active on film from 1919 through 1942, feminist pioneer,bronchial pneumonia

=== 15 ===
- Mario Casariego y Acevedo, 74, Spanish-born Guatemalan Catholic, served as the Archbishop of Santiago de Guatemala from 1964 until his death in 1983, Cardinal since 1969

=== 16 ===
- Ofelia Montesco, 46, Peruvian expatriate actress, stomach cancer

=== 17 ===
- George Benson, 72, British actor

=== 18 ===
- Ana María González, 64, Mexican singer

=== 23 ===
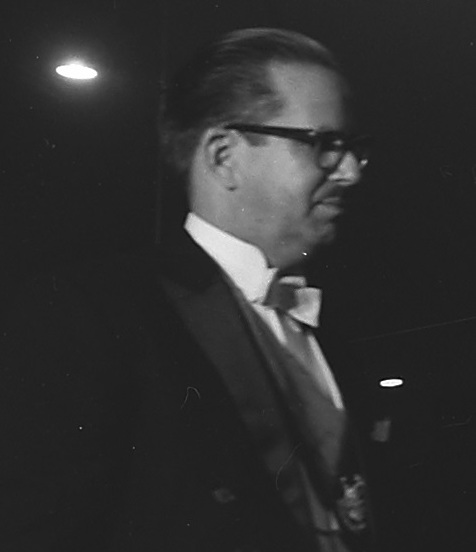
Osvaldo Dorticós Torrado

- Osvaldo Dorticós Torrado, 64, Cuban politician, served as President of Cuba from 1959 until 1976, suicide by firearm
- Jonathan Latimer, 76, American crime writer, screenwriter, and journalist, his stories typically combined hardboiled crime fiction with elements of screwball comedy, lung cancer

=== 25 ===
- Alberto Ginastera, 67, Argentine classical composer

=== 27 ===
- Juan Torena, 85, Filipino footballer and Hollywood actor, played as a forward for Barcelona in the late 1910s

=== 28 ===
- Dorothy Annan, 83, English painter, potter and muralist

=== 30 ===
- Herbert Baker, 62, American songwriter and screenwriter
- Mary Livingstone, 78, American radio comedienne, actress, and biographer, heart disease

== Sources ==
- LaSalle, Mick (2000). Complicated Women: Sex and Power in Pre-Code Hollywood. New York: St Martin's Press. ISBN 978-0-312-25207-6.
- Obituary of Mr George Benson, The Times, 21 June 1983 (pg. 12; Issue 61564; col G)
- Palmer, Christopher; Miceli, Sergio (November 26, 2013). "Amfitheatrof [Amfitheatrov; Amfiteatrov], Daniele (Alexandrovich)". Grove Music Online. doi:10.1093/omo/9781561592630.013.3000000173.
