= Deaths in March 1999 =

The following is a list of notable deaths in March 1999.

Entries for each day are listed alphabetically by surname. A typical entry lists information in the following sequence:

- Name, age, country of citizenship at birth, subsequent country of citizenship (if applicable), reason for notability, cause of death (if known), and reference.

== March 1999 ==
=== 1 ===
- Hans Andersen, 73, Norwegian footballer.
- Vasile Chelaru, 77, Romanian fencer and Olympian (1952).
- Ann Corio, 89, American burlesque stripper and actress, pneumonia.
- Carl Crawford, 63, Guyanese boxer and Olympian (1960).
- Christine Glanville, 74, British puppeteer.
- Enneüs Heerma, 54, Dutch politician, lung cancer.
- Digger Kettle, 76, English footballer.
- Harry Mather, 78, English football player and manager.
- Jozo Matošić, 86, Yugoslav football player and coach.
- Christophe Mirgain, 96, Luxembourgian Olympic sprinter (1924).
- Steve Sinko, 89, American football player (Boston Redskins), and coach.

=== 2 ===
- David Ackles, 62, American singer-songwriter and child actor, lung cancer.
- Leslie Edward Wostall Codd, 90, South African plant taxonomist.
- Nick Cooney, 64, Irish Olympic sports shooter (1980).
- Janusz Kalbarczyk, 88, Polish Olympic speed skater (1936).
- Kaushal Kishore, 56, Indian polymer chemist, cardiac arrest.
- Stuart Mossman, 56, American guitar maker and entertainer, heart attack.
- Tommy Pearson, 85, Scottish football player and manager.
- Dusty Springfield, 59, British traditional pop singer and entertainer, breast cancer.
- Francisco Nunes Teixeira, 89, Mozambican Roman Catholic bishop, Roman Catholic Diocese of Quelimane (1955−1975).
- Jack Webster, 80, Canadian journalist and radio / television personality.

=== 3 ===
- John Brown, 80, American baseball player.
- Glennon Engleman, 72, United States Army veteran and hitman, diabetes.
- Jackson C. Frank, 56, American folk musician, pneumonia and cardiac arrest.
- John Frawley, 98, Australian actor.
- Gerhard Herzberg, 94, German-Canadian physicist and physical chemist.
- William McGonagle, 73, American naval officer and recipient of the Medal of Honor.
- Gian Vincenzo Moreni, 67, Italian prelate of the Catholic Church.
- Lee Philips, 72, American actor and film / television director, PSP.
- Ling Zifeng, 81, Chinese film director.

=== 4 ===
- Harry Blackmun, 90, American lawyer, jurist and Associate Justice of the Supreme Court.
- Del Close, 64, American comedian and actor (The Blob, Next of Kin, The Untouchables), emphysema.
- Richard Joseph Davis, 78, American politician.
- Eddie Dean, 91, American country singer-songwriter and actor, heart and lung disease.
- Reza Entezari, 52, Iranian Olympic sprinter (1972).
- Fritz Honegger, 81, Swiss politician.
- Miłosz Magin, 69, Polish composer and pianist, heart attack.
- Teddy McRae, 91, American jazz tenor saxophonist and arranger.
- Hawley Pratt, 87, American film director, animator and illustrator.
- Karel van het Reve, 77, Dutch writer and literary historian and brother of writer Gerard Reve.

=== 5 ===
- Avery Alexander, 88, American civil rights leader and politician.
- William Allis, 97, American theoretical physicist.
- John Leland Atwood, 94, American engineer and aerospace executive.
- Tom Denning, Baron Denning, 100, English lawyer and judge.
- Walter Diggelmann, 83, Swiss road bicycle racer.
- Alex Eagle, 85, American football player (Brooklyn Dodgers).
- John Figueroa, 78, Jamaican poet.
- John Harkins, 66, American actor (Being There, Absence of Malice, Birdy).
- Bob Hendren, 75, American gridiron football player (Washington Redskins).
- Maurice Jouvet, 76, French-Argentine actor.
- Richard Kiley, 76, American Emmy Award-winning film, television and stage actor, bone marrow disease.

=== 6 ===
- Ted Alexander, 86, American baseball player.
- Graham Armitage, 62, English actor.
- Jack Aubin, 91, Canadian swimmer and Olympian (1928).
- Rafael Celestino Benítez, 81, American submarine commander and admiral.
- William Fox, 86, English wrestler and Olympian (1936).
- Klaus Gysi, 87, German communist journalist, publisher, and resistance member during World War II.
- Hiroshi Hamaya, 83, Japanese photographer.
- Loni Heuser, 91, German film actress.
- Branka Jurca, Slovene writer.
- Ferenc Kardos, 61, Hungarian film director, producer and screenwriter, heart attack.
- Isa bin Salman Al Khalifa, 67, emir of Bahrain (1961–1999), heart attack.
- Venâncio da Silva Moura, 59, Angolan politician and diplomat.
- János Parti, 66, Hungarian sprint canoeist and Olympic champion (1952, 1956, 1960).
- William Petten, 76, Canadian politician, member of the Senate of Canada (1968-1998).
- Dennis Viollet, 65, English footballer.
- Olof Widgren, 91, Swedish stage and film actor.
- Eric Wolf, 76, Austrian-American anthropologist and activist, liver cancer.

=== 7 ===
- Friedrich Asinger, 91, Austrian chemist and academic.
- Lowell Fulson, 77, American blues guitarist and songwriter.
- Sidney Gottlieb, 80, American chemist and spymaster.
- Kurt Hasse, 82, German cinematographer.
- Antônio Houaiss, 83, Brazilian writer and lexicographer.
- Stanley Kubrick, 70, American film director and screenwriter (2001: A Space Odyssey, The Shining, Dr. Strangelove), heart attack.
- Linda Hodge McLaughlin, 57, American district judge (United States District Court for the Central District of California).
- Roger Rouse, 64, American boxer and Olympian (1956).
- Ladislav Vodička, 68, Czech country music singer and songwriter.

=== 8 ===
- António Campos, 76, Portuguese film director.
- Giovan Battista Carpi, 71, Italian comics artist, he worked mainly for Disney comics, mostly on books featuring Donald Duck and Scrooge McDuck, although he occasionally drew Mickey Mouse as well, he was a co-creator of Paperinik and the creator of several characters for Edizioni Bianconi, such as Geppo, Nonna Abelarda, and Soldino.
- Adolfo Bioy Casares, 84, Argentine writer and journalist.
- Peggy Cass, 74, American actress, comedian, and announcer, heart failure.
- Hans Eklund, 71, Swedish composer
- Joe DiMaggio, 84, American Hall of Fame baseball player (New York Yankees), lung cancer.
- Anne T. Hill, 82, American fashion designer and yoga teacher, she designed dresses for her own line, Taffy, from 1937 until March 1958, her products were featured as "outstanding" in a Palm Springs Tennis Club fashion luncheon in 1948, Vogue and Harper's Bazaar carried full page ads for Taffy fashions during the 1950s, heart failure.
- Walter Kolm-Veltée, 88, Austrian film director.
- Walter Ledgard, 83, Peruvian Olympic swimmer (1936).

=== 9 ===
- Ernst Foreth, 74, Austrian footballer.
- Marcellino Gavilán, 89, Spanish equestrian and Olympic medalist (1948, 1952).
- Arnold Machin, 87, British artist and sculptor.
- Hermann Merkin, 91, American businessman and philanthropist, heart failure.
- Éliane Richepin, 88, French classical pianist.
- Harry Somers, 73, Canadian composer.

=== 10 ===
- Bob Cotton, 78, American basketball player.
- William Eriksen, 90, Norwegian footballer.
- Zvi Fuchs, 81, Israeli football player.
- Oswaldo Guayasamín, 79, Ecuadorian painter and sculptor, heart attack.
- Kusumagraj, 87, Indian poet, playwright and novelist.
- Alta Little, 75, American baseball player.
- Adrian Love, 54, British radio presenter.
- Valentino Mazzia, 77, American forensic anesthesiologist, cirrhosis.

=== 11 ===
- C. Clyde Atkins, 84, American district judge (United States District Court for the Southern District of Florida).
- Howell Conant, 82, American fashion photographer.
- Peter Franken, 70, American physicist.
- Herbert Jasper, 92, Canadian psychologist, neurologist, and epileptologist.
- Jack Jones, 83, Scottish football player.
- Camille Laurin, 76, Canadian psychiatrist and politician, liver cancer.
- Erich Natusch, 87, German sailor and Olympic medalist (1952, 1956).
- Stefan Schnabel, 87, German-American actor, heart attack.
- Kaoru Tada, 38, Japanese manga artist, cerebral hemorrhage.

=== 12 ===
- John Archer, 75, British Army officer and Commander in Chief.
- Moose Dunstan, 84, American football player (Chicago Cardinals, Cleveland Rams).
- Miloslav Holub, 84, Czech actor.
- William Jackson, 81, British Army general, military historian and author.
- Sydney Lewis, 79, American businessman, philanthropist, and art collector.
- Yehudi Menuhin, 82, American-born British violinist and conductor, bronchitis.
- Alf Murray, 83, Irish Gaelic footballer.
- Richard Parsons, 88, American Olympic cross-country skier (1932, 1936).
- Bidu Sayão, 96, Brazilian operatic soprano.

=== 13 ===
- Lucienne Bloch, 90, Swiss-American artist.
- Emmy Bridgwater, 92, English artist and poet.
- Giordano Damiani, 68, Italian Olympic basketball player (1952).
- Isidore de Souza, 64, Beninese priest, heart attack.
- Lee Falk, 88, American cartoonist (The Phantom, Mandrake the Magician).
- Seán Fortune, 45, Irish Catholic priest, and child molester, suicide by drug overdose.
- Bob Hollway, 73, American football player and coach.
- Garson Kanin, 86, American writer and director of plays and films.
- Bill Peterman, 77, American baseball player (Philadelphia Phillies).
- Michel Picard, 64, French Olympic canoeist (1960).
- Anton Raadik, 82, Estonian-American boxer.
- Kurt Von Hess, 56, Canadian wrestler known as Kurt Von Hess, heart attack.
- Christopher York, 89, British politician.

=== 14 ===
- Kirk Alyn, 88, American actor (Superman, Blackhawk, Call of the Rockies), Alzheimer's disease.
- Tex Blaisdell, 78, American cartoonist (Little Orphan Annie).
- John Broome, 85, American comic book writer for DC Comics.
- Gregg Diamond, 49, American pianist, drummer, songwriter, and producer, gastrointestinal bleeding.
- Kjell Holmström, 82, Swedish bobsledder and Olympian (1952, 1956, 1964).
- Abraham Kurland, 86, Danish wrestler and Olympic silver medalist (1932, 1948).
- Stig Lindbäck, 61, Swedish Olympic middle-distance runner (1964).
- Robert Q. Marston, 76, American physician and research scientist.
- Marius Müller, 40, Norwegian musician, television host and record producer, traffic collision.

=== 15 ===
- Guy D'Artois, 81, Canadian army officer and SOE agent.
- Harry Callahan, 86, American photographer.
- Rosemary Nelson, 40, Northern Irish human rights solicitor, killed by Ulster loyalists.
- Ray Russell, 74, American writer of short stories, novels and screenplays, complications from a stroke.
- Ian Thompson, 30, Bahamian high jumper and Olympian (1992, 1996).

=== 16 ===
- Trygve Bull, 93, Norwegian lecturer and politician.
- Harry Colville, 75, Scottish football player and manager.
- Hendrik de Wit, 89, Dutch botanist.
- Peter Farrell, 76, Irish footballer.
- Ignazio Gardella, 93, Italian architect and designer.
- Gratien Gélinas, 89, Canadian author, playwright, actor and producer.
- Åsta Holth, 95, Norwegian novelist, poet and short story writer.
- Vijay Kumar Kapahi, 55, Indian astrophysicist.
- John Liddell, 65, Scottish football player.
- Gustav Lohse, 87, German film editor.
- Willie Toner, 69, Scottish football player and manager.

=== 17 ===
- Lloyd Appleton, 93, American wrestler and Olympian (1928).
- Boleslaw Barlog, 92, German stage, film, and opera director.
- Paul Campbell, 76, American film actor.
- Frankie Curry, Northern Irish Ulster loyalist, shot.
- Nicolae Dumitrescu, 77, Romanian footballer and manager.
- Ernest Gold, 77, Austrian-American film composer (Exodus, It's a Mad, Mad, Mad, Mad World, Judgment at Nuremberg), stroke.
- Herbert E. Grier, 87, American electrical engineer and business executive.
- Rod Hull, 63, British entertainer and comedian, fall.
- Humberto Fernández Morán, 75, Venezuelan research scientist.
- Elling Øvergård, 51, Norwegian Olympic sports shooter (1968).
- Hildegard Peplau, 89, American nursing theorist.
- Jean Pierre-Bloch, 93, French politician and resistance member during World War II.
- Eric Stanton, 72, American underground cartoonist and fetish art pioneer.

=== 18 ===
- Patricia Bowman, 90, American ballerina, musical theatre actress, and television personality.
- Knut Dahlen, 76, Norwegian footballer.
- Werner Danz, 75, German politician and member of the Bundestag.
- George Hinterhoeller, 71, Canadian boat designer and builder, heart attack.
- Karl Litschi, 86, Swiss road bicycle racer.
- Gilbert Ralston, 87, British-American screenwriter, congestive heart failure.
- Russell Ross, 69, American professor of pathology.
- Gerlando Sciascia, 65, American mobster and member of the Bonanno crime family, shot.

=== 19 ===
- Tofilau Eti Alesana, 74, Samoan politician.
- William F. Bringle, 85, American four-star admiral and World War II aviator, pneumonia.
- Bob Cato, 76, American photographer and graphic designer, Alzheimer's disease.
- Joseph DePietro, 84, American weightlifter, Olympic champion (1948).
- José Agustín Goytisolo, 70, Spanish poet, scholar and essayist, suicide by jumping.
- Peppermint Harris, 73, American blues singer and guitarist.
- Juanita Reina, 73, Spanish actress and copla singer.
- Jaime Sabines, 72, Mexican contemporary poet.
- Pritam Singh Sandhu, 67, Kenyan Olympic field hockey player (1960).

=== 20 ===
- Elsa Barraine, 89, French composer.
- Alfred Gansiniec, 79, Polish ice hockey player and Olympian (1948, 1952).
- Patrick Heron, 79, British artist, critic, writer, and polemicist.
- Roy L. Johnson, 93, American admiral.
- David Anthony Klarner, 58, American mathematician and author.
- Sivert Mattsson, 91, Swedish Olympic cross-country skier (1932).
- Mickey S. Michaels, 67, American set decorator (Airport, The Hunt for Red October, Crimson Tide).
- Paul Toth, 63, American baseball player (St. Louis Cardinals, Chicago Cubs), heart attack.
- Igor Vladimirov, 80, Soviet film and theater actor and director.

=== 21 ===
- Mary Ainsworth, 85, American-Canadian developmental psychologist, stroke.
- René Charrière, 75, Swiss Olympic racewalker (1952, 1960).
- Henry V. Graham, 82, American Army general.
- Jean Guitton, 97, French Catholic philosopher and theologian.
- John Linus Paschang, 103, American Roman Catholic bishop.
- George Reedy, 81, American White House Press Secretary under President Lyndon B. Johnson (1964–1965).
- Ernie Wise, 73, British comedian (Morecambe and Wise), heart failure.

=== 22 ===
- Max Beloff, Baron Beloff, 85, British historian.
- Keith Grogono, 86, British Olympic sailor (1936).
- C. Gregg Singer, 89, American historian and theologian.
- Sandy Singleton, 84, English cricket player.
- David Strickland, 29, American actor, suicide by hanging.

=== 23 ===
- Scott D. Anderson, 33, American pilot, inventor, and author, plane crash.
- Luis María Argaña, 66, Paraguayan politician and Supreme Court judge, shot.
- Osmond Borradaile, 100, Canadian cameraman, cinematographer and veteran of World War I and II.
- Robert Edward DeMascio, 76, American district judge (United States District Court for the Eastern District of Michigan).
- Norman Jones, 69, Australian Olympic boxer (1952).
- Koentjaraningrat, Indonesian anthropologist.
- Sergio Montanari, 61, Italian film editor.
- Percy Samaraweera, 70, Sri Lankan politician.
- Willi Stadel, 86, German gymnast and Olympic champion (1936).
- Kazue Takahashi, 70, Japanese voice actress, multiple myeloma.
- Petrus Tun, 63, Micronesian politician.

=== 24 ===
- Edmund Tobin Asselin, 78, Canadian politician, member of the House of Commons of Canada (1962-1965).
- Rodolfo Clavería, 76, Chilean footballer.
- Pierre H. Dubois, 81, Dutch writer and critic.
- Ellen Hall, 75, American actress.
- Tunde Idiagbon, 56, Nigerian Army general.
- Henry Brandon, Baron Brandon of Oakbrook, 78, British judge.
- Odd Sannes, 76, Norwegian Olympic sports shooter (1948).
- Gertrud Scholtz-Klink, 97, German leader of the nazi National Socialist Women's League.
- Birdie Tebbetts, 86, American baseball player (Detroit Tigers, Boston Red Sox, Cleveland Indians), manager and scout.
- Val Valentin, 79, American recording engineer.
- Mighty Joe Young, 71, American chicago blues guitarist, pneumonia.
- Osman Örek, 73, Turkish Cypriot politician, prime minister (1978).

=== 25 ===
- Ryszard Bakst, 72, Polish pianist and piano teacher.
- Viacheslav Chornovil, 61, Ukrainian politician, car crash.
- Bobby Jones, 86, American football player (Green Bay Packers).
- Cal Ripken Sr., 63, American baseball coach and manager, lung cancer.
- Doug Sherrington, 84, Australian politician.
- Enrique Wirth, 74, Argentine Olympic modern pentathlete (1948).

=== 26 ===
- Harry Hodson, 92, English economist and editor.
- David Holliday, 61, American actor (Thunderbirds), cancer.
- Reşit Kaynak, 46, Turkish football player.
- Eva Kolstad, 80, Norwegian politician and gender equality activist.
- Andrzej Konopka, 64, Polish Olympic gymnast (1960, 1964).
- Sel Lisle, 77, Australian rugby league footballer.
- Margaret Mason, 58, American actress, heart attack.
- Andrija Otenhajmer, 72, Yugoslav Olympic middle-distance runner (1952).
- Zoran Radosavljević, 34, Yugoslav Air Force pilot, shot down.
- Ananda Shankar, 56, Indian musician, heart attack.

=== 27 ===
- Michael Aris, 53, English historian, prostate cancer.
- Ernestina de Champourcín, 93, Spanish poet.
- Gordon Cowey, 68, Australian Olympic rower (1956).
- Albert Huybrechts, 84, Belgian Olympic sailor (1948).
- Rolf Ludwig, 73, German actor and voice actor.
- Nahum Stelmach, 62, Israeli footballer and manager.
- Oskar Øksnes, 77, Norwegian politician.

=== 28 ===
- Harihar Banerjee, 76, Indian Olympic sports shooter (1952, 1956).
- Jens Book-Jenssen, 88, Norwegian pop singer, songwriter, revue artist and theatre director.
- Eva Franco, 92, Argentine actress, pneumonia.
- Franco Gasparri, 50, Italian actor, respiratory failure.
- Angelo J. LaPietra, 79, American mobster and member of the Chicago Outfit.
- Gil Perkins, 91, Australian actor.
- Robert W. Pidacks, 70, American Olympic cross-country skier (1952).
- Edmund Schallenberg, 85, American Olympic handball player (1936).
- Freaky Tah, 27, American MC, hype man and hip hop promoter, shot.
- Bill Touhey, 93, Canadian ice hockey player (Montreal Maroons, Ottawa Senators, Boston Bruins).
- Doody Townley, 73, New Zealand harness racer.
- Jim Turner, 54, American editor and publisher.

=== 29 ===
- Lucien Aigner, 97, Hungarian photojournalist.
- Lennart Brunnhage, 83, Swedish diver and Olympian (1948).
- Dayendranath Burrenchobay, 80, Mauritian politician, Governor-General.
- Marty Christiansen, 82, American football player (Chicago Cardinals).
- Helmer Dahl, 90, Norwegian electrical engineer and researcher.
- Raimo Kuuluvainen, 43, Finnish football player and Olympian (1980).
- James Penberthy, 81, Australian composer and journalist.
- Brock Speer, 79, American gospel singer (Speer Family).
- Vera Tolstoy, 95, Russian-American émigré, broadcaster and granddaughter of novelist Leo Tolstoy.
- Joe Williams, 80, American jazz singer.
- Gyula Zsengellér, 83, Hungarian footballer.

=== 30 ===
- Albert Coppé, 87, Belgian politician and economist.
- Michel Crépeau, 68, French politician, heart attack.
- Marcel de Wolf, 79, French Olympic gymnast (1948, 1952).
- Michel Etcheverry, 79, French actor.
- Gary Morton, 74, American stand-up comedian, lung cancer.
- Jens Müller, 81, Norwegian fighter pilot and POW during World War II and author.
- Igor Netto, 69, Soviet-Russian footballer and Olympian (1952, 1956).
- Glen Smith, 68, Canadian ice hockey player (Chicago Black Hawks).
- Terry Wilson, 75, American actor.

=== 31 ===
- David Brooks, 83, American actor, singer, director, and producer.
- Aleksandr Filatov, 71, Soviet Olympic alpine skier (1956).
- Chuck Hanneman, 84, American football player (Detroit Lions, Cleveland Rams).
- Curt James Haydn, 80, Norwegian Olympic bobsledder (1952).
- Ike Kahdot, 99, American baseball player (Cleveland Indians).
- Yuri Knorozov, 76, Soviet linguist, pneumonia.
- Ramón Balcells Rodón, 79, Spanish Olympic sailor (1952, 1972).
- Herbert H. Rowen, 82, American historian.
- Church Russell, 76, Canadian ice hockey player (New York Rangers).
- Jerry Toth, 70, Canadian musician, composer, and record producer.
