= Deaths in December 2003 =

The following is a list of notable deaths in December 2003.

Entries for each day are listed alphabetically by surname. A typical entry lists information in the following sequence:

- Name, age, country of citizenship at birth, subsequent country of citizenship (if applicable), reason for notability, cause of death (if known), and reference.

== December 2003 ==
=== 1 ===
- Hamza Alavi, 82, Pakistani-British sociologist and activist (Campaign Against Racial Discrimination).
- Fernando Di Leo, 71, Italian film director and script writer.
- Clark Kerr, 92, American academic, chancellor of the University of California, Berkeley (1952–58), complications from a fall.
- Eugenio Monti, 75, Italian bobsledder and Olympian (1956, 1964, 1968), suicide by gunshot.
- Ken Moore, 86, American football player (New York Giants).
- Carl Schenkel, 55, Swiss film director, heart attack.
- Uday Singh Taunque, 21, U.S. Army soldier.

=== 2 ===
- Ruth Nanda Anshen, 103, American philosopher, author and editor.
- Suzanne Cloutier, 80, Canadian film actress, liver cancer.
- Alan Davidson, 79, British food writer and diplomat.
- Vic Gordon, 92, British Australian actor of vaudeville, television and film.
- Ignaz Kiechle, 73, German politician and minister for agriculture (1983–1993).
- Coy Koopal, 71, Dutch footballer.
- Frances Morris, 95, American actress.
- Rudolph A. Peterson, 98, American banker.
- Jim Sheehan, 90, American baseball player (New York Giants).

=== 3 ===
- Dulce Chacón, 49, Spanish poet, novelist and playwright, pancreatic cancer.
- Jay Difani, 80, American baseball player (Washington Senators).
- Ellen Drew, 88, American film actress, liver ailment.
- Heinrich Enea, 81, Romanian Olympic bobsledder (1956).
- Sita Ram Goel, 82, Indian historian, activist, writer, and publisher.
- David Hemmings, 62, British actor and director, heart attack.

=== 4 ===
- Jace Bugg, 27, American professional golfer.
- Ramón Climent, 74, Chilean footballer.
- John H. Hannah, Jr., 64, American judge (U.S. District Judge of the U.S. District Court for the Eastern District of Texas), heart attack.
- John Haley, 72, American attorney, plane crash.
- Iggy Katona, 87, American racing driver.
- Dezső Lemhényi, 85, Hungarian water polo player, coach and Olympic champion (1948, 1952).
- Georges Moreel, 79, French footballer.
- Louis Prahm, 91, Danish Olympic field hockey player (1936).
- Jimmy Smith, 92, Scottish football player.
- David Vaughan, 59, English psychedelic artist.
- Jacques Viau, 84, Canadian lawyer and reformist.

=== 5 ===
- Paul Busby, 85, American baseball player (Philadelphia Phillies).
- Vasile Chitaru, 44, Romanian footballer.
- Bob Gregory, 82, American comics artist and writer.
- Felix Kaspar, 88, Austrian figure skater and Olympian (1936).
- Jack Keller, 61, American poker player.
- José Manuel Pesudo, 67, Spanish football goalkeeper and coach.
- Antony Rowe, 79, English rower and Olympian (1948).
- Gregorio García Segura, 74, Spanish composer of film scores.
- Yasuo Tanaka, 71, Japanese voice actor.

=== 6 ===
- Haddis Alemayehu, 93, Ethiopian Foreign Minister and novelist.
- John Bingham, 61, British classical pianist.
- Paul-Louis Halley, 69, French businessman, plane crash.
- Hans Hotter, 84, German operatic bass-baritone.
- José María Jiménez, 32, Spanish road bicycle racer, heart attack.
- Barry Long, 77, Australian spiritual teacher and writer.
- P. Madhavan, 75, Indian film director and producer in Tamil cinema.
- Javier Montez, 74, American Olympic middle-distance runner (1952).
- Carlos Manuel Arana Osorio, 85, Guatemalan military ruler, President of Guatemala.
- Jerry Tuite, 36, American wrestler, heart attack.

=== 7 ===
- Roland Asselin, 86, Canadian Olympic fencer (1948, 1952, 1956).
- Barta Barri, 92, Hungarian-Spanish film actor.
- Robert R. Benton, 79, American set decorator, respiratory failure.
- Carl F. H. Henry, 90, American Evangelical theologian and founder of Christianity Today magazine.
- Esko Karu, 57, Canadian cross-country skier (1968).
- Azie Taylor Morton, 67, American public servant (Treasurer of the United States), complications from a stroke.
- Joe Skeen, 76, American politician, member of the United States House of Representatives (1981-2003), Parkinson's disease.

=== 8 ===
- Lewis M. Allen, 81, American film and Broadway producer, nominated for seven Tony Awards, pancreatic cancer.
- Margaret Jean Anderson, 84, Canadian businesswoman and senator (representing Northumberland--Miramichi, New Brunswick).
- Nelson Bobb, 79, American professional basketball player (Temple University, Philadelphia Warriors), cancer.
- Agnès Delahaie, 83, French actress and film producer.
- Robert Detweiler, 73, American competition rower and Olympic champion (1952), naval officer, and scientist.
- Timothy Feruka, 49, Zambian Olympic boxer (1972).
- Rubén González, 84, Cuban pianist.
- Pekka Siitoin, 59, Finnish satanist, occultist and neo-Nazi, esophageal cancer.
- Francine Weisweiller, 87, French socialite and patron of Jean Cocteau.

=== 9 ===
- Carol M. Bundy, 61, American serial killer, heart failure.
- Blackie Ko, 50, Taiwanese film director, stuntman, singer and actor, blood poisoning.
- Keith McCreary, 63, Canadian hockey player (Montreal Canadiens, Pittsburgh Penguins, Atlanta Flames), cancer.
- Thomas M. Rees, 78, American politician, member of the United States House of Representatives (1965-1977).
- Bill Schroeder, 80, American basketball and football player (Wisconsin Badgers, Chicago Rockets, Sheboygan Red Skins).
- Gladys Shelley, 91, American lyricist and composer.
- Paul Simon, 75, American author and politician, United States Senator from Illinois (1985-1997), surgical complications.
- Norm Sloan, 77, American college basketball player and coach (The Citadel, University of Florida, North Carolina State).

=== 10 ===
- Abida Ahmed, 80, Indian politician, First Lady of India as wife of Fakhruddin Ali Ahmed (1974-1977).
- Robert L. Bartley, 66, American newspaper editor (The Wall Street Journal editorial page) and Pulitzer Prize winner.
- Oswald Cheung, 81, Hong Kong lawyer and politician, complications from burns.
- Elizabeth Harrower, 85, American actress and television writer, cancer.
- László Jeszenszky, 76, Hungarian Olympic middle-distance runner (1952, 1952).
- Sean McClory, 79, Irish actor.
- Bill Morey, 83, American actor.
- Bob Ross, 69, American publisher (Bay Area Reporter) and gay rights activist, complications from diabetes.
- Raúl Armando Savoy, 63, Argentine football player.
- Don Wheeler, 81, American baseball player (Chicago White Sox).

=== 11 ===
- Malcolm Clarke, 60, British composer.
- Ahmadou Kourouma, 76, Ivorian novelist.
- Shah Ahmad Noorani, 77, Pakistani Islamic scholar, mystic, philosopher, revivalist and an ultra–conservative politician.
- Ann Petersen, 76, Belgian actress.
- Paschoal Rapuano, 93, Brazilian Olympic rower (1936).
- Ram Kishore Shukla, 80, Indian politician.
- Paulos Tzadua, 82, Ethiopian Catholic Archbishop of Addis Ababa.

=== 12 ===
- Heydar Aliyev, 80, Azerbaijani politician, served as the third president of Azerbaijan.
- Ross Belsher, 70, Canadian politician (member of Parliament of Canada for Fraser Valley East, British Columbia).
- Eva Besnyö, 93, Dutch-Hungarian photographer.
- Michael Casson, 78, British potter.
- Howard Edward Crosby, 70, Canadian politician and lawyer, member of the House of Commons of Canada (1978-1993).
- Joseph Anthony Ferrario, 77, American Roman Catholic prelate, Bishop of Honolulu (1982–1993), heart attack.
- Earl Gillespie, 81, American sportscaster, voice of the Milwaukee Braves.
- Marcello Giombini, 75, Italian composer.
- Keiko, 27, orca famed for Reino Aventura and Free Willy, pneumonia.
- Rudolf Krause, 76, German football player and coach.
- Kurt Magnus, 91, German scientist.
- George Pastushok, 81, American basketball player (St. John's Red Storm, Providence Steamrollers).
- Fadwa Tuqan, 86, Palestinian poet.
- Skip Wolters, 74, Singaporean Olympic water polo player (1956).

=== 13 ===
- Elizabeth Bates, 56, American professor of cognitive science, pancreatic cancer.
- Luis González y González, 78, Mexican historian.
- Mollie Hardwick, 87, British writer.
- Alexis Kanner, 61, French-Canadian film and television actor, heart attack.
- Yuriy Kutenko, 71, Soviet Ukrainian decathlete and Olympian (1956, 1960).
- David Perlov, 73, Israeli documentary filmmaker.
- Balasubramaniam Ramamurthi, 81, Indian neurosurgeon and author.
- William Roth, 82, American lawyer and politician United States Senator from Delaware from 1971 to 2001.
- Xie Tian, 89, Chinese actor and director.
- Webster Young, 71, American jazz trumpeter (Miles Davis, John Coltrane, Dizzy Gillespie), brain cancer.
- Māris Čaklais, 63, Latvian poet and writer.

=== 14 ===
- Daniel Arasse, 59, French art historian, amyotrophic lateral sclerosis.
- Don Concannon, 73, British Labour Party politician.
- Jeanne Crain, 78, American actress, heart attack.
- Vladimir Kotyrev, 72, Soviet Russian Olympic canoeist (1952).
- Blas Ople, 75, Filipino journalist and politician, heart attack.
- François Rauber, 70, French pianist, composer, arranger and conductor.
- Frank Sheeran, 83, American labor union leader and mobster, "The Irishman", cancer.

=== 15 ===
- Valerio Bonini, 79, Italian racing cyclist.
- Johnny Cunningham, 46, British folk musician, heart attack.
- Jack Gregory, 80, British athlete and Olympic silver medalist (1948, 1952).
- Garvin Hamner, 79, American baseball player (Philadelphia Phillies).
- Göthe Hedlund, 85, Swedish speed skater and Olympic medalist (1948, 1952).
- David S. Lewis, 86, American aerospace engineer.
- Keith Magnuson, 56, Canadian ice hockey player (Chicago Black Hawks), road accident.
- Edward Montagne, 91, American television series producer and film director.
- Sergio Vergara, 76, Chilean Olympic fencer (1964).
- Dora Wasserman, 84, Russian-Canadian actress, playwright, and theater director.

=== 16 ===
- Siegfried Hold, 72, German cinematographer.
- Alfred Lynch, 72, English actor, cancer.
- Judd Marmor, 93, American psychoanalyst and psychiatrist.
- Hugo Moser, 77, Argentine television and film producer and screenwriter, cardiovascular disease.
- Madlyn Rhue, 68, American actress (It's a Mad, Mad, Mad, Mad World, Days of Our Lives, Bracken's World), pneumonia.
- Aglaja Schmid, 77, Austrian stage and film actress.
- Veikko Sinisalo, 77, Finnish actor.
- Robert Stanfield, 89, Canadian politician (member of Parliament representing Colchester—Hants and Halifax, Nova Scotia), pneumonia.
- Gary Stewart, 58, American country music singer "She's Actin' Single (I'm Drinkin' Doubles)", suicide by gunshot.
- Peter Hardy, Baron Hardy of Wath, 72, British Labour Party politician.

=== 17 ===
- Fujinishiki Akira, 66, Japanese sumo wrestler.
- Bonnie Baker, 85, Canadian baseball player.
- Thomas Coulter, 92, Canadian-American ice hockey player (Chicago Black Hawks).
- Ed Devereaux, 78, Australian actor, cancer.
- Otto Graham, 82, American gridiron football (Cleveland Browns) and member of the Pro Football Hall of Fame, heart aneurysm.
- Wally Hedrick, 75, Seminal American artist in the 1950s California counterculture, gallerist, and educator.
- Mary Ann Jackson, 80, American child actress, heart attack.
- Franz Offenberger, 72, Austrian Olympian speed skater (1952, 1956, 1960).
- José Richa, 69, Brazilian politician.
- David Smith, 69, English cricketer.
- Alan Tilvern, 86, English actor and voice artist (Bhowani Junction, The Lord of the Rings, Who Framed Roger Rabbit).
- Jim Wolf, 51, American gridiron football player (Prairie View A&M, Pittsburgh Steelers, Kansas City Chiefs), multiple sclerosis.

=== 18 ===
- Charles Berlitz, 90, American linguist, spoke 32 languages.
- Glenn Cunningham, 91, American politician, member of the United States House of Representatives (1957-1971).
- Jack Dormand, 84, British politician.
- Ergilio Hato, 77, Dutch Antillean goalkeeper from Curaçao and Olympian (1952).
- Branko Horvat, 75, Croatian economist and politician.
- Cresson Kearny, 89, United States Army officer.
- Susan Travers, 94, only English woman to serve in the French Foreign Legion.
- Richard Wahlstrom, 72, American Olympic rower (1952).

=== 19 ===
- Roger Conant, 94, American herpetologist, cancer.
- Yan Frid, 95, Soviet screenwriter and film director.
- Roy Hughes, Baron Islwyn, 78, British Labour Party politician and trade union organiser.
- Klaus Lahti, 94, Finnish Olympic sports shooter (1948, 1952).
- Hope Lange, 70, American actress, ischemic colitis, infectious disease.
- Heinz Marquardt, 80, German Luftwaffe fighter ace during World War II and recipient of the Knight's Cross of the Iron Cross.
- Carmen Mauro, 77, American baseball player (Chicago Cubs, Brooklyn Dodgers, Washington Senators, Philadelphia Athletics).
- Les Tremayne, 90, English actor, heart failure.

=== 20 ===
- Charles Randolph Grean, 90, American producer and composer.
- Grigore Grigoriu, 62, Moldovan actor, car accident.
- Rudy Houtsch, 87, Luxembourger Olympic cyclist (1936).
- Alan Magee, 84, American World War II airman, survived 22,000 ft. fall, stroke, kidney failure.
- Gil Reece, 61, Welsh footballer.
- Kostas Valsamis, 95, Greek sculptor.

=== 21 ===
- Gawaine Baillie, 69, British amateur racing driver, industrialist, and stamp collector.
- Lucio Figueirêdo, 76, Brazilian Olympic water polo player (1952).
- M. J. Gopalan, 94, Indian sportsman, among which cricket.
- Prince Alfonso of Hohenlohe-Langenburg, 79, Spanish businessman and playboy, prostate cancer.
- G. V. Iyer, 86, Indian film director and actor.
- Judit Kiss-Gerhardt, 62, Hungarian Olympic volleyball player (1972).
- Hans Koller, 82, Austrian jazz tenor saxophonist and bandleader.
- Andrea Scotti, 72, Italian film and television actor.
- Oleg Troyanovsky, 84, Soviet ambassador to Japan and China and representative to the United Nations (1976-1986).
- Wanda Włodarczyk, 78, Polish Olympic fencer (1952).

=== 22 ===
- Mikhail Borodulin, 36, Kazakhstani Olympic ice hockey player (1998), lung cancer.
- Wah Chang, 86, Chinese-American designer, sculptor, and artist.
- Dave Dudley, 75, American country music singer, heart attack.
- Mohamed Ali Ahmed El-Rashidy, 80, Eygptian basketball player and Olympian (1952).
- Rose Hill, 89, English actress and operatic soprano.
- John Holter, 87, American toolmaker and medical device inventor.
- George Patterson, 64, American basketball player (Toledo Rockets, Detroit Pistons).
- Doris Shadbolt, 85, Canadian art curator and writer.
- Andreas Tietze, 89, Austrian scholar of Turkish lexicography and language.

=== 23 ===
- Charlie Bowles, 86, American baseball player (Philadelphia Athletics).
- Kriangsak Chamanan, 86, Prime minister of Thailand.
- Valentin Gavrilov, 57, Russian high jumper and Olympic medalist (1968).
- Don Lamond, 83, American jazz drummer, brain tumor.
- John Newlove, 65, Canadian poet and editor.
- John Sanders, 70, British organist, pneumonia.
- Chandu Sarwate, 83, Indian cricketer and fingerprint expert.
- Guglielmo Trevisan, 85, Italian football manager and football player.

=== 24 ===
- Manfred Ebert, 68, German footballer.
- Juan García, 77, Cuban Olympic basketball player (1948, 1952).
- Fernando Gazapo, 83, Spanish Olympic equestrian (1948).
- Herman Keiser, 89, American golfer, Alzheimer's disease.
- James Kitching, 81, South African vertebrate palaeontologist, cancer.
- Gunnar Alf Larsen, 83, Norwegian Labour Party politician.
- Eugene Maltsev, 74, Soviet Russian painter.
- Noel Toy, 84, American burlesque performer.

=== 25 ===
- Charles Concordia, 95, American electrical engineer and computer pioneer.
- Ulf Isaksson, 49, Swedish ice hockey player (AIK IF, Los Angeles Kings).
- Nicholas Mavroules, 74, American politician, member of the United States House of Representatives (1979-1993).
- Nicola Paone, 88, American singer, songwriter, and restaurateur.

=== 26 ===
- Hugh Bean, 74, English violinist, teacher and leader of the Philharmonia Orchestra.
- Gale Bishop, 81, American professional basketball player (Washington State, Philadelphia Warriors).
- Redfern Froggatt, 79, English footballer.
- Phil Goldman, 39, American engineer and entrepreneur, heart failure.
- Joanna de Tuscan Harding, 95, American fencer and Olympian (1936).
- Chauncy Harris, 89, American geographer.
- Alain-François Lehoerff, 62, French Olympic sailor (1964).
- Clifton McNeely, 84, American basketball player and coach.
- Poul Otto, 90, Danish Olympic high jumper (1936).
- Paul Owens, 79, American Major League Baseball manager, and scout (Philadelphia Phillies).
- Ivan Petrov, 83, Soviet and Russian bass opera singer.
- Yoshio Shirai, 80, first Japanese world boxing champion, pneumonia.
- Milan Vasić, 75, Serbian historian.

=== 27 ===
- Pete Alvarado, 83, American animation and comic book artist (Disney Studios, Warner Bros. Animation, Western Publishing), heart attack.
- Alan Bates, 69, British actor (The Fixer, Zorba the Greek, Women in Love), pancreatic cancer.
- Iván Calderón, 41, Puerto Rican baseball player (Seattle Mariners, Chicago White Sox, Montreal Expos), homicide by gunshot.
- Ingeborg Cook, 88, Norwegian actress and singer.
- Lawrence Cook, 73, American actor.
- Gerhard Doerfer, 83, German philologist.
- Vestal Goodman, 74, American Southern Gospel singer, complications from influenza.
- Elmo Bolton Hunter, 88, American district judge (United States District Court for the Western District of Missouri).
- Heinz Kiessling, 77, German musician, conductor, composer and music producer.
- Nagavally R. S. Kurup, 86, Indian writer and broadcaster.
- E. Arsenio Manuel, 94, Filipino academic, historian, and anthropologist.
- K. S. Narasimhaswamy, 88, Indian poet.
- Richie Niemiera, 82, American basketball player and coach (Notre Dame, Fort Wayne Pistons, Anderson Packers).
- Juan García Ponce, 71, Mexican novelist, short-story writer, essayist, and art critic.
- Patrick J. Reynolds, 83, Irish politician.
- Ying Ruocheng, 74, Chinese actor (Marco Polo, The Last Emperor, Little Buddha), director, and China's vice-minister of culture.
- Melvin Storer, 82, American shipfitter and navy diver
- Chet Tollstam, 85, American basketball player.

=== 28 ===
- Harald Feller, 90, Swiss diplomat and Righteous Among the Nations for his efforts during World War II.
- Guy Héraud, 83, French politician and lawyer.
- Helen Kleeb, 96, American film and television actress.
- Michael Melle, 73, South African cricket player.
- Frank Parr, 85, British chess player.
- Thomas Pearsall, 83, Australian politician.
- Polly Rosenbaum, 104, American politician and teacher.
- Johannes Schmitt, 60, German athlete and Olympian (1964).
- Murray Smith, 63, British television writer and producer.
- A. William Sweeney, 83, American soldier and lawyer.
- John Terraine, 82, British military historian.
- Kushabhau Thakre, 81, Indian politician and a Member of parliament.

=== 29 ===
- Charles E. Beatley, 87, American politician, mayor of Alexandria, Virginia.
- Michael Courtney, 58, Irish prelate of the Catholic Church, homicide.
- Jaime de Piniés, 86, Spanish diplomat.
- Gerald Gutierrez, 53, American Tony Award-winning stage director, respiratory failure.
- Earl Hindman, 61, American actor (Home Improvement, The Parallax View, Taps), lung cancer.
- Dinsdale Landen, 71, British actor, pneumonia.
- Don Lawrence, 75, British comic book artist, pulmonary emphysema.
- Bob Monkhouse, 75, British comedian and game show host, prostate cancer.
- Veikko Räsänen, 75, Finnish cross-country skier and Olympian (1956, 1960).
- Tino Schwierzina, 76, German lawyer and politician.
- Miko Sotto, 21, Filipino matinee idol.
- Michel Zanoli, 35, Dutch road cyclist and Olympian (1988), heart failure.
- Ersa Siregar, 52, Indonesian journalist, murdered

=== 30 ===
- David Bale, 62, South African businessman and activist, lymphoma.
- Vladimir Bogomolov, 77, Soviet writer (The Moment of Truth, 1973).
- John Gregory Dunne, 71, American novelist and screenwriter, heart attack.
- Bobby Freeman, 71, American football player (Cleveland Browns, Green Bay Packers, Philadelphia Eagles).
- Nora Heysen, 92, Australian artist.
- Dick Holmberg, 72, US Virgin Islander Olympic sailor (1972).
- John Koniszewski, 82, American football player (Washington Redskins).
- Ibram Lassaw, 90, Russian-American sculptor.
- Anita Mui, 40, Hong Kong pop queen, cervix uterine cancer.
- Patricia Roc, 88, English film actress, kidney failure.
- Johnny Sands, 75, American film and television actor.
- Salma Sobhan, 66, Bangladeshi lawyer, academic, and human rights activist.
- Hukwe Zawose, 65, Tanzanian musician.

=== 31 ===
- German Apukhtin, 67, Soviet Russian football player.
- Geoffrey Thomas Sandford Baylis, 90, New Zealand botanist and academic.
- John A. Franks, 78, American businessman and a thoroughbred racehorse owner and breeder.
- Dora Gad, 91, Israeli interior designer.
- Gerald Goldberg, 91, Irish lawyer and politician.
- Béla Julesz, 75, Hungarian-American visual neuroscientist and experimental psychologist.
- Béla Kárpáti, 74, Hungarian football player.
- John Prchlik, 78, American football player (Detroit Lions).
- Paula Raymond, 79, American model and actress, respiratory failure.
- David Scott-Barrett, 81, British army general.
- Danny Taylor, 82, Irish Olympic rower (1948).
- Valentin Vdovichenko, 75, Soviet Olympic fencer (1956).
- Sieglinde Wagner, 82, Austrian operatic contralto.
- Max West, 87, American baseball player (Boston Bees/Braves, Cincinnati Reds, Pittsburgh Pirates), brain cancer.
