= Deaths in November 2002 =

The following is a list of notable deaths in November 2002.

Entries for each day are listed alphabetically by surname. A typical entry lists information in the following sequence:

- Name, age, country of citizenship at birth, subsequent country of citizenship (if applicable), reason for notability, cause of death (if known), and reference.

== November 2002 ==
=== 1 ===
- Ekrem Akurgal, 91, Turkish archaeologist.
- Yisrael Amir, 99, Israeli Air Force commander.
- Edward Brooke, 85, Canadian Olympic fencer (1952).
- Nicholas John Bua, 77, American district judge (United States District Court for the Northern District of Illinois).
- Eduardo Decena, 76, Filipino Olympic basketball player (1948).
- Amadou Cissé Dia, 87, Senegalese politician and playwright.
- Käte Jaenicke, 79, German theater and film actress.
- Benjamin Keen, 89, American historian specialising in the history of colonial Latin America.
- Lester Morgan, 26, Costa Rican professional football goalkeeper, suicide.
- Keith A. Wester, 62, American sound engineer (The Rock, Air Force One, Armageddon).

=== 2 ===
- Brian Behan, 75, Irish writer and playwright, younger brother of Brendan Behan.
- Paul Gordon, 75, American basketball player (Baltimore Bullets).
- Robert Haslam, Baron Haslam, 79, British industrialist and life peer.
- Annelisa Kilbourn, 35, British conservationist and veterinarian, plane crash.
- Lo Lieh, 63, Hong Kong actor, heart attack.
- Felicity Peake, 89, British Director of the Women's Royal Air Force.
- Tonio Selwart, 106, Bavarian actor and Broadway performer.
- Charles Sheffield, 67, English-born American science fiction author and physicist.

=== 3 ===
- Ulrika Babiaková, 26, Slovak astronomer and discoverer of minor planets, accident.
- Mary Bird, 92, American Olympic alpine skier (1936).
- Lonnie Donegan, 71, British skiffle musician ("Rock Island Line", "John Henry"), heart attack.
- John Habakkuk, 87, British economic historian.
- Jonathan Harris, 87, American actor (Lost in Space, A Bug's Life, The Third Man), heart failure.
- Torsten Lindqvist, 76, Swedish modern pentathlete and Olympian (1952).
- William M. Packard, 69, American poet and author.
- Warren Peace, 81, American baseball player.

=== 4 ===
- Raoul Diagne, 91, French football player.
- Antonio Margheriti, 72, Italian filmmaker, heart attack.
- Juan Araújo Pino, 81, Spanish football player.
- Marvin Porter, 78, American racing driver.
- Malcolm Ross, 91, Canadian literary critic, pneumonia.
- Jerry Sohl, 88, American television scriptwriter and science fiction author.
- Jack Thornton, 92, American baseball player.
- Ross Wilson, 83, Canadian ice hockey trainer (Detroit Red Wings).

=== 5 ===
- Vinnette Justine Carroll, 80, American Broadway director (Don't Bother Me, I Can't Cope, Your Arms Too Short to Box with God).
- Ansley J. Coale, 84, American demographer.
- Marcel Dheere, 83, Canadian ice hockey player (Montreal Canadiens).
- Billy Guy, 66, American singer.
- Bunjaku Han, 54, Taiwanese actress, complications of cancer.
- Joaquín Navarro Perona, 81, Spanish football player.
- Arthur Winfree, 60, American theoretical biologist, known for his studies of biological oscillations.
- Jaroslav Zajíček, 82, Czech Olympic cross-country skier (1948).

=== 6 ===
- Alfonso Martínez Domínguez, 80, Mexican governor.
- Folke Frölén, 94, Swedish Olympic equestrian (1952).
- René Kremer, 77, Luxembourgian Olympic decathlete (1948).
- Roy Leaper, 96, Australian rules footballer.
- Michel Majerus, 35, Luxembourgish artist, killed aboard Luxair Flight 9642.
- Bruno Petronio, 66, Italian Olympic sailor (1964).
- Sid Sackson, 82, American board game designer.
- Gianluca Signorini, 42, Italian footballer, amyotrophic lateral sclerosis.
- Joginder Singh, 62, Indian field hockey player and Olympic champion (1960, 1964).
- Ed Smallwood, 65, American college basketball player (Evansville Purple Aces).
- Stefan Wagner, 89, Austrian football player.

=== 7 ===
- Rudolf Augstein, 79, German journalist and publisher, founder of Der Spiegel, pneumonia.
- Charles Hambro, Baron Hambro, 72, British merchant banker and political fundraiser.
- Dilys Hamlett, 74, British actress.
- James Grier Miller, 86, American biologist, a pioneer of systems science.
- Peg Phillips, 84, American actress (Northern Exposure), pulmonary disease.
- Tino Sabbadini, 74, French road bicycle racer.
- Pedro Juan Soto, 74, Puerto Rican writer, killed by police officers.

=== 8 ===
- Tom Barrington, 58, American gridiron football player (Ohio State, Washington Redskins, New Orleans Saints).
- Jon Elia, 70, Pakistani Marxist.
- Querube Makalintal, 91, Filipino Chief Justice of the Supreme Court.
- Tove Nielsen, 85, Danish Olympic swimmer (1936).
- Rudolf Noelte, 81, German film director, theater director and opera director.
- Zoé Oldenbourg, 86, Russian-born French historian and novelist.
- Christopher Parsons, 70, English wildlife film-maker and producer.
- Antonín Šponar, 82, Czech Olympic alpine skier (1948).
- Ke Zhao, 92, Chinese mathematician.

=== 9 ===
- Adrian Aeschbacher, 90, Swiss classical pianist.
- Bill Baxter, 78, Scottish footballer.
- Jan Hulsker, 95, Dutch art historian.
- Richard Jeffrey, 76, American philosopher, logician, and probability theorist, lung cancer.
- Cliff Patton, 79, American professional football player (Philadelphia Eagles, Chicago Cardinals).
- Merlin Santana, 26, American actor (The Steve Harvey Show, Getting By, The Cosby Show), shot.
- William Schutz, 76, American psychologist.
- Eusebio Tejera, 80, Uruguayan footballer.

=== 10 ===
- Michel Boisrond, 81, French film director and screenwriter, known for directing Brigitte Bardot in Naughty Girl.
- Anne-Marie Brunius, 86, Swedish film actress.
- Franco Fantasia, 78, Italian actor.
- Johnny Griffith, 66, American musician, heart attack.
- Émile Ollivier, 62, Haitian-Canadian writer.
- Ken Raffensberger, 85, American baseball player (St. Louis Cardinals, Chicago Cubs, Philadelphia Phillies, Cincinnati Reds/Redlegs).
- Yevgeni Skomorokhov, 57, Russian football coach and player.
- Gert Westphal, 82, German-Swiss actor, recitator and director, cancer.

=== 11 ===
- Frances Ames, 82, South African neurologist, psychiatrist, and human rights activist, leukemia.
- Sir Michael Clapham, 90, British industrialist.
- Zoe Ducós, 74, Argentine actress.
- Pietro Giudici, 81, Italian racing cyclist.
- Mary Hamilton, 67, American civil rights activist (Hamilton v. Alabama).
- Esther Raziel-Naor, 90, Israeli Zionist, Irgun leader and politician.
- Marcia Van Dyke, 80, American violinist and actress.
- Yoo Youngkuk, 86, Korean abstract artist.

=== 12 ===
- William Wallace Barron, 90, American politician (26th governor of West Virginia), indicted and pleaded guilty to jury tampering.
- Glenn Dobbs, 82, American gridiron football player (Brooklyn Dodgers, Los Angeles Dons) and college football coach (University of Tulsa).
- Lester Holtzman, 89, American jurist and politician, member of the United States House of Representatives (1953-1961).
- Johannes Kerkorrel, 42, South African singer-songwriter, journalist and playwright, suicide by hanging.
- Nicholas Mukomberanwa, 62, Zimbabwean sculptor.
- John Westbergh, 87, Swedish skier.

=== 13 ===
- Frederick Valentine Atkinson, 86, British mathematician (Atkinson's theorem, Atkinson–Wilcox theorem).
- Bill Berry, 72, American jazz trumpeter (Duke Ellington Orchestra, Bill Berry and the L.A. Band).
- Alexandru Dragomir, 86, Romanian philosopher.
- Roland Hanna, 70, American jazz pianist, composer, and teacher, viral infection.
- Taylor Howard, 70, American scientist and radio engineer, plane crash.
- Kaloji Narayana Rao, 88, Indian poet, freedom fighter, and political activist.
- Siri Rom, 84, Norwegian actress.
- Irv Rubin, 57, Canadian chairman of the Jewish Defence League, fall.
- Juan Alberto Schiaffino, 77, Italian-Uruguayan football player.
- Rishikesh Shah, 77, Nepalese writer, politician and human rights activist.
- Michael Stewart, 57, American musician, songwriter, and producer, suicide.
- Ken Thomas, 42, American football player (Kansas City Chiefs).

=== 14 ===
- Eddie Bracken, 87, American actor (Hail the Conquering Hero, The Miracle of Morgan's Creek, National Lampoon's Vacation), surgical complications.
- René Meléndez Brito, 73, Chilean football player, cancer.
- Sir Walter Crocker, 100, Australian diplomat, writer and war veteran.
- James R. Hendrix, 77, US Army sergeant and a recipient of the Medal of Honor, cancer.
- Jim Hester, 57, American football player (New Orleans Saints, Chicago Bears).
- Gourish Kaikini, 90, Indian litterateur, teacher and columnist.
- Elena Nikolaidi, 93, Greek-American opera singer and teacher.
- Gedong Bagus Oka, 81, Indonesian Hindu reformer and philosopher.
- Mir Qazi, 38, Pakistani convicted criminal, executed by lethal injection.
- Dale Emerson Saffels, 81, American lawyer, legislator, and District Judge.
- Manohar Singh, 64, Indian film and theatre actor and director, lung cancer.

=== 15 ===
- W. J. Burley, 88, British crime writer.
- André Clot, 93, French historian and essayist.
- Ed Freed, 83, American baseball player (Philadelphia Phillies).
- Bert Granet, 92, American writer and television producer.
- Myra Hindley, 60, British serial killer, cardiovascular disease.
- Sohn Kee-chung, 90, Korean Olympic athlete (1936), and long-distance runner, pneumonia.
- Terry Kendall, 55, New Zealand golfer, car fire.
- Reijo Kiiskilä, 38, Finnish Olympic weightlifter (1988).
- Nils Landgren, 79, Swedish bobsledder and Olympian (1952).
- Mary Meigs, 85, American painter and writer.
- Ihor Shcherbak, 59, Soviet Ukrainian runner and Olympian (1972).
- John Joseph Stewart, 79, New Zealand rugby coach, cancer.

=== 16 ===
- Ramli Ahmad, 46, Malaysian Olympic sprinter (1976), stroke.
- George Barrie, 90, American businessman (owner and CEO of Fabergé Inc.) and songwriter (two-time nominee for Academy Award for Best Original Song).
- Steve Durbano, 50, Canadian ice hockey player (Pittsburgh Penguins, St. Louis Blues), lung cancer.
- Tom Farris, 82, American professional football player (University of Wisconsin, Chicago Bears, Chicago Rockets).
- George Gardiner, 67, British politician.
- Alfred Lewis Levitt, 86, American film and television screenwriter, heart failure.
- Sima Milovanov, 79, Serbian football player and manager.
- Frank Smithies, 90, British mathematician.
- Dick Snoek, 76, Dutch footballer.
- Zdeněk Žára, 70, Czech rower and Olympian (1956).

=== 17 ===
- Abba Eban, 88, Israeli Foreign Affairs Minister, ambassador to the U.S., ambassador to the U.N.
- Frank McCarthy, 78, American artist and painter, lung cancer.
- Marvin Mirisch, 84, American film producer, cancer.
- Akshaya Mohanty, 65, Indian singer, musician and writer.
- Chagdud Tulku Rinpoche, 72, Tibetan teacher of Vajrayana Tibetan Buddhism.

=== 18 ===
- Alberto Barenghi, 72, Argentine Olympic boxer (1952).
- Bolot Beishenaliev, 65, Soviet cinematographer, film and theater actor.
- Angus Cameron, 93, American book editor and publisher, known for being blacklisted during McCarthy era.
- James Coburn, 74, American actor (The Magnificent Seven, The Great Escape, Affliction), Oscar winner (1999), heart attack.
- Francesco De Martino, 95, Italian jurist and politician, considered to be the conscience of the Italian Socialist Party.
- Kim Gallagher, 38, American middle-distance runner and Olympian (1984, 1988), stroke.
- Edith Hirsch Luchins, 80, Polish-American mathematician.
- Pete Orr, 46, American racing driver.
- Ulysses Redd, 88, American baseball player.
- Pasquale Vivolo, 74, Italian footballer and Olympian (1952).
- Juliusz Wyrzykowski, 56, Polish movie and stage actor.
- Zaldy Zshornack, 64, Filipino actor.

=== 19 ===
- Vito Ciancimino, 78, Italian politician (mayor of Palermo, Sicily) and Mafia member, heart attack.
- George Fullerton, 79, South African cricketer.
- K. M. George, 88, Indian writer and educator.
- Max Reinhardt, 86, British publisher.
- Jean-Claude Renard, 80, French poet.
- André Roch, 96, Swiss mountaineer, avalanche researcher, and author.
- Harry Watson, 79, Canadian professional hockey player (Detroit Red Wings, Toronto Maple Leafs, Chicago Black Hawks).

=== 20 ===
- Kakhi Asatiani, 55, Georgian football player and manager, shot.
- Louis van den Bogert, 78, Dutch footballer.
- Billy Goelz, 84, American professional wrestler, booker and trainer.
- George Guest, 78, British organist and choirmaster.
- Niddy Impekoven, 98, German dancer and actress.
- Webster Lewis, 59, American jazz and disco composer, arranger and keyboardist, pneumonia and diabetes.
- Margita White, 65, American White House press official under Richard M. Nixon and Gerald R. Ford.

=== 21 ===
- Robert Brentano, 76, American historian specializing in medieval England and Italy.
- Hadda Brooks, 86, American jazz singer, pianist and composer, known as the "Queen of the Boogie".
- Amílcar de Castro, 82, Brazilian sculptor, known for works in iron.
- Arturo Guzmán Decena, 26, Mexican drug trafficker and founder of criminal syndicate Los Zetas, shot.
- George Emslie, Baron Emslie, 82, Scottish judge and life peer.
- Buddy Kaye, 84, American songwriter, producer, and author.
- Norihito, Prince Takamado, 47, Japanese prince, heart attack.

=== 22 ===
- Parley Baer, 88, American radio, television and film actor (The Andy Griffith Show, The Adventures of Ozzie and Harriet, The Addams Family), stroke.
- Joan Barclay, 88, American actress.
- Rafał Gan-Ganowicz, 70, Polish mercenary, journalist, and social activist, lung cancer.
- Adele Jergens, 84, American actress, pneumonia.
- Arne Mellnäs, 69, Swedish composer.
- C. S. Nayudu, 88, Indian cricket player.
- Miomir Petrović, 79, Yugoslavian footballer.
- Azra Quraishi, 57, Pakistani botanist.
- Noël Regney, 80, French World War II veteran and songwriter, pick disease.
- Infanta Beatriz of Spain, 93, Spanish noblewoman and daughter of King Alfonso XIII.
- Harry Sharkey, 86, American Olympic rower (1936).
- Tsuneharu Sugiyama, 62, Japanese wrestler and Olympian (1964), heart failure.

=== 23 ===
- Erna Bogen-Bogáti, 95, Hungarian Olympic fencer (1928, 1932, 1936).
- Boudewijn Büch, 53, Dutch writer, poet and television presenter, cardiac arrest.
- Maritie Carpentier, 79, French television show producer.
- Jackie Gayle, 76, American standup comedian and actor.
- Roberto Matta, 91, Chilean artist.
- Richard Mohr, 83, American producer of classical and operatic music recordings.
- Tibor Polakovič, 67, Slovak Olympic canoeist (1960).
- Billy Travis, 41, American professional wrestler, heart attack.

=== 24 ===
- Branko Dangubić, 80, Yugoslavian and Serbian Olympic javelin thrower (1952).
- Noel Davis, 75, English film and television actor and casting director (Merlin, Reds), pulmonary emphysema.
- Mikhail Devyatayev, 85, Soviet fighter pilot who escaped from a Nazi concentration camp during World War II.
- Harriet Doerr, 92, American author.
- Lewis Samuel Feuer, 89, American sociologist, philosopher, professor and author.
- Richard Lazarus, 80, American psychologist.
- Philip B. Meggs, 60, American graphic designer, leukemia.
- John Rawls, 81, American moral and political philosopher.
- John Tosi, 88, American football player.

=== 25 ===
- Ed Bliss, 90, American broadcast journalist and news editor.
- Charles E. Chamberlain, 85, American politician (U.S. Representative for Michigan's 6th congressional district), heart failure.
- Gordon Davidson, 87, Australian politician (member of Australian Senate representing South Australia).
- Patricio Escobal, 99, Spanish footballer and Olympian (1924).
- Woodrow W. Jones, 88, American politician and judge.
- John Drummond, 8th Earl of Perth, 95, British politician and aristocrat.
- Karel Reisz, 76, British film director (The French Lieutenant's Woman, Saturday Night and Sunday Morning, The Gambler).
- Eugene V. Rostow, 89, American legal scholar and public servant.
- Louis Schmit, 94, Luxembourgian Olympic middle-distance runner (1928).
- Meta Vannas, 78, Estonian Soviet politician.

=== 26 ===
- Frank Allaun, 89, British politician (member of Parliament for Salford East from 1955 to 1983).
- Jim Butterfield, 74, American college football coach (Ithaca Bombers).
- Ruzha Delcheva, 87, Bulgarian actress.
- Ralph Engelstad, 72, American casino executive (Imperial Palace).
- Erika Helmke, 96, German stage and film actress.
- Isabel McLaughlin, 99, Canadian painter and philanthropist.
- Polo Montañez, 47, Cuban singer and songwriter, traffic collision.
- Verne Winchell, 87, American business executive, president and CEO of Denny's, heart attack.

=== 27 ===
- Billie Bird, 94, American actress (Sixteen Candles, Ernest Saves Christmas, Home Alone, Dennis the Menace), Alzheimer's disease.
- Stanley Black, 89, English bandleader, composer, conductor and pianist.
- Laurence J. Burton, 76, American politician (U.S. Representative for Utah's 1st congressional district).
- George Christian, 75, American journalist, White House press secretary for President Lyndon B. Johnson.
- Bob deLauer, 82, American gridiron football player (USC, Cleveland/Los Angeles Rams).
- Larry Duran, 77, American actor and stuntman.
- Thor Lunde, 78, Norwegian footballer.
- Edwin L. Mechem, 90, American politician.
- Yeruham Meshel, 90, Israeli union leader and politician.
- Wolfgang Preiss, 92, German theatre, film and television actor.
- Urho Sirén, 70, Finnish Olympic cyclist (1952).
- Pascasio Sola, 74, Argentine footballer.
- Robert W. Straub, 82, American politician, Alzheimer's disease.
- Shivmangal Singh Suman, 87, Indian poet, heart attack.
- Fred Tittle, 82, American politician.

=== 28 ===
- Melih Cevdet Anday, 87, Turkish author.
- Ray Erickson, 84, American racing driver.
- Mike Haggerty, 57, American football player (Pittsburgh Steelers, New England Patriots, Detroit Lions).
- Lennaert Nijgh, 57, Dutch lyricist, gastrointestinal bleeding.
- Billy Pearson, American jockey, film actor, and an art dealer.
- Juan Carlos Díaz Quincoces, 69, Spanish football player.

=== 29 ===
- Damien Covington, 29, American gridiron football player (Buffalo Bills), killed in an attempted robbery.
- Daniel Gélin, 81, French film and television actor, kidney failure.
- Saburo Ienaga, 89, Japanese historian.
- John Justin, 85, British stage and film actor.
- David Weiss, 93, American novelist (Naked Came I).

=== 30 ===
- Alan Ashman, 74, English football player.
- Charles E. Dibble, 93, American academic, anthropologist, linguist, and scholar of pre-Columbian Mesoamerican cultures.
- Kozaburo Hirai, 92, Japanese composer and professor of music.
- Oddrunn Pettersen, 65, Norwegian politician for the Labour Party.
- Bill Sparks, 80, British Royal Marine commando during World War II.
- Mr. Wrestling, 68, professional wrestler, heart attack.
- Þórður Þórðarson, 72, Icelandic footballer.
