= Raymond Argentin =

French sprint canoeist (1924–2022)

Personal information
- Birth name: René Raymond Argentin
- Born: 15 October 1924; Champagne, Marne, France
- Died: 14 October 2022 (aged 97); Pontault-Combault, Seine-et-Marne, France

Sport
- Sport: Canoe sprint

René Raymond Argentin (15 October 1924 – 14 October 2022) was a French sprint canoeist who competed in the late 1940s. He finished fourth in the C-1 10000 m event at the 1948 Summer Olympics in London. Argentin was a national champion in canoeing in both 1948 and 1949.

== Biography ==
René Raymond Argentin was born in Champagne, Marne on 15 October 1924. He started canoeing in 1942, and quickly gained proficiency in the sport. His time on the national canoeing team would last just three years, from 1948 to 1950. However, he got the opportunity to represent France in the C-1 10000 event at the 1948 Summer Olympics in London. After being selected, Argentin would train alone in Marne every day for 10 km (10,000m an hour). At the Games, he finished in fourth place and missed the podium, coming in just over two minutes after Canada's Norm Lane. He finished with a time of 1:06:44.

Argentin was also selected to compete, alongside his friend Robert Boutigny, at the 1950 World Championships, but did not attend, stating that he had been sacked following his return from the 1948 Olympics missing work due to sport, and had been rehired on the condition that he did not do it again. Argentin was the national C-1 1000 champion in 1948, as well as the C-1 1000 and 10000 champion in 1949.

As of 2010, Argentin was still actively canoeing at the age of 86. In June 2017, Argentin stated his belief that Olympic champion František Čapek should have been disqualified at the 1948 Games for using a non-approved boat. In January 2020, Argentin was noted as being the oldest surviving member of the Association of French Canoe-Kayak Internationals (AIFCK). He died in Pontault-Combault, Seine-et-Marne on 14 October 2022, one day before his 98th birthday.
