= Canoeing at the 1952 Summer Olympics – Men's C-1 10000 metres =

These are the results of the men's C-1 10000 metres competition in canoeing at the 1952 Summer Olympics. The C-1 event is raced by single-man sprint canoes and took place on July 27.

== Medalists ==
Gold	Silver	Bronze
Frank Havens (USA)	Gábor Novák (HUN)	Alfréd Jindra (TCH)

== Final ==
With only ten competitors in the event, no prelims were held.

Rank	Athlete	Time
1st place, gold medalist(s)	Frank Havens (USA)	57:41.1
2nd place, silver medalist(s)	Gábor Novák (HUN)	57:49.9
3rd place, bronze medalist(s)	Alfréd Jindra (TCH)	57:53.1
4	Bengt Backlund (SWE)	59:08.2
5	Norman Lane (CAN)	59:26.4
6	Jarl Fagerström (FIN)	59:45.9
7	Franz Johannsen (GER)	1:00:26.5
8	Robert Boutigny (FRA)	1:01:15.2
9	Gerald Marchand (GBR)	1:02:21.7
10	Pavel Kharin (URS)	1:03:03.2

After his victory, Havens sent a telegraph to his father Bill, who missed the canoeing events (it was a demonstration sport at the time) at the 1924 Summer Olympics in Paris to be with his wife during Frank's childbirth. The telegram ended with "I'm coming home with the gold medal you should've won."

Charles W "Bud" Havens, Frank Havens' uncle and Bill Havens Sr's brother, did participate in the canoeing events in 1924 and won 3 unofficial gold medals.
