= Canoeing at the 1964 Summer Olympics – Men's C-1 1000 metres =

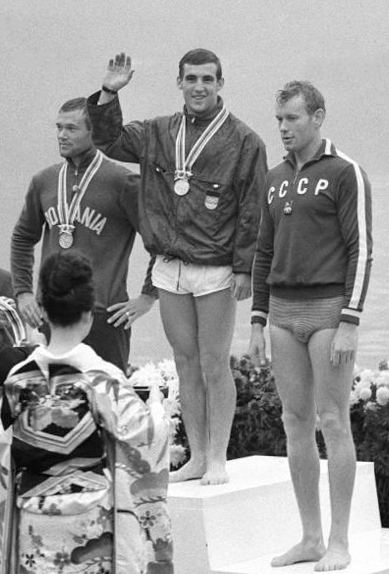
Andrei Igorov, Jürgen Eschert and Yevgeny Penyayev on the podium

The men's C-1 1000 metres event was an open-style, individual canoeing event conducted as part of the Canoeing at the 1964 Summer Olympics programme on Lake Sagami, Japan.

The preliminary heats were held on 20 October 1964; 11 competitors entered and were split into two heats of 6 and 5 canoeists. The top three placers in each heat advanced to the final, while the remaining five entrants had to compete in a semifinal held the next day. The 2 slowest canoeists were eliminated in the semifinal on 21 October, with the top 3 joining the initial 6 finalists. The final was held on 22 October, following the 2 individual kayaking event finals but preceding the 4 pairs and fours events.

== Medallists ==
Gold	Silver	Bronze
Jürgen Eschert (EUA)	Andrei Igorov (ROU)	Yevgeny Penyayev (URS)

== Results ==
=== Heats ===
Top three in each heat move on to final, all others relegated to semifinal.

==== Heat 1 ====
Rank	Canoer	Country	Time	Notes
1.	Yevgeny Penyayev	Soviet Union	4:41.06	QF
2.	Andras Toro	Hungary	4:42.31	QF
3.	Bogdan Ivanov	Bulgaria	4:48.39	QF
4.	Paul Stahl	Canada	5:08.28	QS
5.	Dennis van Valkenburgh	United States	5:12.63	QS
6.	Fred Wasmer	Australia	5:26.80	QS

==== Heat 2 ====
Rank	Canoer	Country	Time	Notes
1.	Jürgen Eschert	United Team of Germany	4:36.92	QF
2.	Andrei Igorov	Romania	4:39.57	QF
3.	Ove Emanuelsson	Sweden	4:46.73	QF
4.	Shoji Yoshio	Japan	5:05.11	QS
5.	Jan Jiran	Czechoslovakia	5:18.33	QS

=== Semifinal ===
Only the five canoeists who had not advanced during the first round competed in the semifinal. The top three of these five received another chance, moving on to the final. The other two were eliminated.

Rank	Canoer	Country	Time	Notes
1.	Paul Stahl	Canada	4:55.79	QF
2.	Jan Jiran	Czechoslovakia	4:58.59	QF
3.	Dennis van Valkenburgh	United States	5:00.34	QF
4.	Shoji Yoshio	Japan	5:00.88	
5.	Fred Wasmer	Australia	5:16.40	

=== Final ===
Rank	Canoer	Country	Time	Notes
1st place, gold medalist(s)	Jürgen Eschert	United Team of Germany	4:35.14	
2nd place, silver medalist(s)	Andrei Igorov	Romania	4:37.89	
3rd place, bronze medalist(s)	Yevgeny Penyayev	Soviet Union	4:38.31	
4.	Andras Toro	Hungary	4:39.95	
5.	Ove Emanuelsson	Sweden	4:42.70	
6.	Bogdan Ivanov	Bulgaria	4:44.76	
7.	Paul Stahl	Canada	5:04:79	
8.	Dennis van Valkenburgh	United States	5:12.55	
9.	Jan Jiran	Czechoslovakia	5:40.00	
