= Danzy =

Danzy is both a surname and a given name. Notable people with the name include:

- Theophilus Danzy (1930–2012), American football coach
- Danzy Senna (born 1970), American writer

== See also ==
- Danny
- Danz
