= Donald Stringer (canoeist) =

Canadian canoeist (1933–1979)

Personal information
- Born: December 29, 1933; Canada
- Died: January 8, 1979 (aged 45)

Sport
- Sport: Canoeing
- Event: Sprint canoe

Donald Stringer (December 29, 1933 – January 8, 1979) was a Canadian sprint canoer who competed in the late 1950s and the early 1960s. Competing in two Summer Olympics, he earned his best effort of seventh twice (1956: C-1 10000 m, 1960: C-1 1000 m).

== Early life ==
=== Early competitions ===
Don Stringer started canoeing in 1948 aged 14. He won the Canadian Juvenile Singles championship in 1950 then the Canadian Juniors and the 10,000 metres Open in 1951.

Stringer failed to make the 1952 Olympic team due to overturning his boat in the Ottawa trials. However, he broke Frank Amyot's 1936 record when he won the senior 1,000 metre singles at the Canadian national championships in 1952. The next year he beat the Olympic gold medallist Frank Havens at a competition in Washington. He was named to the 1956 Olympic team and finished seventh in the C-1 10,000m, which was the best Canadian result in canoe-kayak at those games. He moved to Montreal after those games, but still made the 1960 canoe team. He again finished seventh, this time in C-1 1000m.

Stringer retired from the sport in 1962, and died 16 years later. He was survived by three sons. He was inducted into the Greater Sudbury Sports Hall of Fame in 2019. The Canadian national championship trophy for U17 Men's C-1 is named for him.
