= William Schuette =

William Schuette may refer to:

- Bill Schuette (born 1953), American congressman from Michigan (1985–91)
- William Schuette (canoeist) (1933–2002), American canoer who competed in the 1950s
