= Tognon =

Tognon is an Italian surname. Notable people with the surname include:

- Danilo Tognon (born 1937), Italian sprint canoer
- Gianluca Tognon Italian food scientist, researcher, public health expert, author, and speaker
- Omero Tognon (1924–1990), Italian footballer and manager
