= Canoeing at the 1952 Summer Olympics – Men's C-1 1000 metres =

These are the results of the men's C-1 1000 metres competition in canoeing at the 1952 Summer Olympics. The C-1 event is raced by single-man sprint canoes. Because there were ten competitors in the event, heats were introduced. Both the heats and final took place on July 28.

== Medalists ==
Gold	Silver	Bronze
Josef Holeček (TCH)	János Parti (HUN)	Olavi Ojanperä (FIN)

== Results ==
=== Heats ===
The ten competitors first raced in two heats. The top four finishers in each heat moved directly to the final.

==== Heat 1 ====
Rank	Canoer	Country	Time	Notes
1	Jean Molle	France	4:56.1	QF
2	János Parti	Hungary	4:58.5	QF
3	Frank Havens	United States	5:09.3	QF
4	Ingemar Andersson	Sweden	5:11.9	QF
5	George Bossy	Canada	5:25.8	

==== Heat 2 ====
Rank	Canoer	Country	Time	Notes
1	Josef Holeček	Czechoslovakia	5:06.0	QF
2	Olavi Ojanperä	Finland	5:09.8	QF
3	Ralf Berckhan	Germany	5:17.3	QF
4	Vladimir Kotyrev	Soviet Union	5:21.2	QF
5	Gerald Marchand	Great Britain	5:28.8	

==== Final ====
Rank	Canoer	Country	Time	Notes
1st place, gold medalist(s)	Josef Holeček	Czechoslovakia	4:56.3	
2nd place, silver medalist(s)	János Parti	Hungary	5:03.6	
3rd place, bronze medalist(s)	Olavi Ojanperä	Finland	5:08.5	
4	Frank Havens	United States	5:13.7	
5	Ingemar Andersson	Sweden	5:15.0	
6	Ralf Berckhan	Germany	5:22.8	
7	Jean Molle	France	5:24.1	
8	Vladimir Kotyrev	Soviet Union	5:24.5	
