= Canoeing at the 1948 Summer Olympics – Men's C-1 10000 metres =

These are the results of the men's C-1 10000 metres competition in canoeing at the 1948 Summer Olympics. The C-1 event is raced by single-man sprint canoes and took place on August 11.

== Final ==
With only five competitors in the event, a final was held. (Note: A sixth canoeist, Karl Molnar, competing for Austria, did not start.)

Rank	Canoeist	Country	Time
1st place, gold medalist(s)	František Čapek	Czechoslovakia	1:02:05.2
2nd place, silver medalist(s)	Frank Havens	United States	1:02:40.4
3rd place, bronze medalist(s)	Norman Lane	Canada	1:04:35.3
4	Raymond Argentin	France	1:06:44.2
5	Ingemar Andersson	Sweden	1:07:27.1
