= Canoeing at the 1960 Summer Olympics – Men's C-1 1000 metres =

Men's canoe sprint C-1 1000 metres at the Games of the XVII Olympiad
- Venue: Lake Albano
- Date: 26–29 August 1960
- Competitors: 13 from 13 nations
- Winning time: 4:33.03

Medalists
1st place, gold medalist(s)		János Parti	Hungary
2nd place, silver medalist(s)		Aleksandr Silayev	Soviet Union
3rd place, bronze medalist(s)		Leon Rotman	Romania

The men's C-1 1000 metres event was an open-style, individual canoeing event conducted as part of the Canoeing at the 1960 Summer Olympics program on Lake Albano.

== Competition format ==
The competition was held over four rounds: heats, repechages, semifinals, and a final. Nobody was eliminated in the heats; the top three canoeists in each of the two heats advanced to the semifinals while all others who competed moved to the repechages. With only 13 competitors entering, this put seven canoeists in the repechages. There were two repechage heats, with the top three in each heat advancing to the semifinals—and only one canoeist eliminated. The semifinals consisted of three heats of four boats each, with the top three in each advancing to the final and only the fourth-place finisher eliminated. Thus, the first three rounds of competition narrowed the field only from 13 to nine boats.

== Results ==
=== Heats ===
Fifteen competitors were entered, but only 13 competed on August 26. The top three finishers in both heats advanced in the semifinals while the others went to the repechages.

==== Heat 1 ====
Rank	Canoer	Country	Time	Notes
1	Aleksandr Silayev	Soviet Union	4:41.81	Q
2	Bogdan Ivanov	Bulgaria	4:47.65	Q
3	Erik Christensen	Denmark	4:50.71	Q
4	Olavi Ojanperä	Finland	4:54.37	R
5	Danilo Tognon	Italy	4:56.58	R
6	Adrian Powell	Australia	5:00.54	R
7	Frank Havens	United States	5:19.40	R

==== Heat 2 ====
Rank	Canoer	Country	Time	Notes
1	János Parti	Hungary	4:36.80	Q
2	Ove Emanuelsson	Sweden	4:36.92	Q
3	Tibor Polakovič	Czechoslovakia	4:38.25	Q
4	Leon Rotman	Romania	4:39.36	R
5	Detlef Lewe	United Team of Germany	4:43.07	R
6	Donald Stringer	Canada	4:44.55	R
–	Kurt Liebhart	Austria	DNS	
–	Michel Picard	France	DNS	

=== Repechages ===
Competed on August 26, the top three finishers in each of the two heats move to the semifinals.

==== Repechage 1 ====
Rank	Canoer	Country	Time	Notes
1	Detlef Lewe	United Team of Germany	4:46.99	Q
2	Adrian Powell	Australia	4:55.24	Q
3	Olavi Ojanperä	Finland	5:00.92	Q

==== Repechage 2 ====
Rank	Canoer	Country	Time	Notes
1	Donald Stringer	Canada	4:44.36	Q
2	Leon Rotman	Romania	5:03.98	Q
3	Danilo Tognon	Italy	5:06.86	Q
4	Frank Havens	United States	5:13.34	

=== Semifinals ===
Twelve canoers competed in the semifinals on August 27. The top three finishers in each semifinal advanced to the final.

==== Semifinal 1 ====
Rank	Canoer	Country	Time	Notes
1	Aleksandr Silayev	Soviet Union	4:36.89	Q
2	Tibor Polakovič	Czechoslovakia	4:37.94	Q
3	Donald Stringer	Canada	4:41.35	Q
4	Olavi Ojanperä	Finland	5:00.88	

==== Semifinal 2 ====
Rank	Canoer	Country	Time	Notes
1	János Parti	Hungary	4:40.50	Q
2	Leon Rotman	Romania	4:43.66	Q
3	Erik Christensen	Denmark	4:48.18	Q
4	Adrian Powell	Australia	4:59.81	

==== Semifinal 3 ====
Rank	Canoer	Country	Time	Notes
1	Ove Emanuelsson	Sweden	4:44.68	Q
2	Bogdan Ivanov	Bulgaria	4:44.93	Q
3	Detlef Lewe	United Team of Germany	4:47.06	Q
4	Danilo Tognon	Italy	5:04.82	

=== Final ===
The final took place on August 29. Parti won using a canoe of his own design.

Rank	Canoer	Country	Time	Notes
1st place, gold medalist(s)	János Parti	Hungary	4:33.03	
2nd place, silver medalist(s)	Aleksandr Silayev	Soviet Union	4:34.41	
3rd place, bronze medalist(s)	Leon Rotman	Romania	4:35.87	
4	Ove Emanuelsson	Sweden	4:36.46	
5	Tibor Polakovič	Czechoslovakia	4:39.72	
6	Detlef Lewe	United Team of Germany	4:39.72	
7	Donald Stringer	Canada	4:40.65	
8	Bogdan Ivanov	Bulgaria	4:42.52	
9	Erik Christensen	Denmark	4:49.63	
