= Canoeing at the 1948 Summer Olympics – Men's C-1 1000 metres =

These are the results of the men's C-1 1000 metres competition in canoeing at the 1948 Summer Olympics. The C-1 event is raced by single-man sprint canoes and took place on August 12.

== Results ==
With only six competitors in the event, a final was held. (Note: A seventh canoeist, Karl Molnar, competing for Austria, did not start.)

=== Final ===
Rank	Canoer	Country	Time	Notes
1st place, gold medalist(s)	Josef Holeček	Czechoslovakia	5:42.0	
2nd place, silver medalist(s)	Douglas Bennett	Canada	5:53.3	
3rd place, bronze medalist(s)	Robert Boutigny	France	5:55.9	
4	Ingemar Andersson	Sweden	6:06.0	
5	William Havens	United States	6:14.3	
6	Harold Maidment	Great Britain	6:37.0	
