= Fagerström =

Fagerström is a surname, with the variant spelling Fagerstrom. Notable people with these surnames include:

== People with the surname Fagerström ==
- Ann-Marie Fagerström (born 1953), Swedish politician
- Asser Fagerström (1912–1990), Finnish pianist, composer and actor
- Christoffer Fagerström (born 1992), Swedish bandy player
- Jarl Fagerström (1914–1975), Finnish sprint canoer
- Linda Fagerström (born 1977), Swedish footballer
