= Paul Stahl =

Canadian canoeist

Paul Stahl (May 18, 1940 – April 20, 2016) was a Canadian sprint canoer who competed in the mid-1960s. At the 1964 Summer Olympics in Tokyo, he finished seventh in the C-1 1000 m event. He won many North American and Canadian Championships in Single and War Canoe.
