= Canoeing at the 1956 Summer Olympics – Men's C-1 10000 metres =

The men's C-1 10000 metres was a competition in canoeing at the 1956 Summer Olympics. The C-1 event is raced by single-man sprint canoes and took place on November 30. This would the last time this event was held in the Summer Olympics though it would be held at the ICF Canoe Sprint World Championships from 1950 to 1993.

== Medalists ==
Gold	Silver	Bronze
Leon Rotman (ROU)	János Parti (HUN)	Gennady Bukharin (URS)

== Final ==
With only nine competitors in the event, a final was held.

Gold	Leon Rotman (ROU)	56:41.0
Silver	János Parti (HUN)	57:11.0
Bronze	Gennady Bukharin (URS)	57:14.5
4.	Jiří Vokněr (TCH)	57:44.5
5.	Franz Johannsen (EUA)	58:50.1
6.	Werner Wettersten (SWE)	59:24.7
7.	Donald Stringer (CAN)	59:57.5
8.	Frank Havens (USA)	1:01:23.6
9.	Bryan Harper (AUS)	1:02:12.1
