= Andrei Igorov =

Romanian canoeist

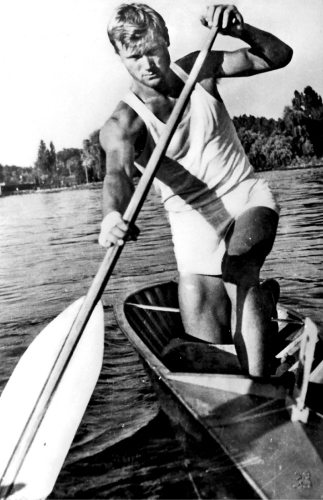
- Igorov at the 1964 Olympics

Personal information
- Born: 10 December 1939 Brăila, Romania
- Died: 10 November 2011 (aged 71) Brăila
- Height: 1.83 m (6 ft 0 in)
- Weight: 87 kg (192 lb)

Sport
- Sport: Canoe racing
Medal record
Representing Romania
Olympic Games
Silver medal – second place	1964 Tokyo	C-1 1000 m
World Championships
Silver medal – second place	1963 Jajce	C-1 10000 m
European Championships
Silver medal – second place	1963 Jajce	C-1 10000 m
Gold medal – first place	1965 Bucharest	C-1 10000 m
Gold medal – first place	1967 Duisburg	C-1 10000 m

Andrei Igorov (10 December 1939 – 10 November 2011) was a Romanian canoe sprinter. He specialized in the C-1 10000 m event, in which he won silver medals at the 1963 World and European Championships, as well as two European titles, in 1965 and 1967. This event was not available at the 1964 Olympics, and Igorov had to compete in the C-1 1000 m. He won a silver medal finishing 0.42 seconds ahead of the third place.
