= Canoeing at the 1956 Summer Olympics – Men's C-1 1000 metres =

The men's C-1 1000 metres was a competition in canoeing at the 1956 Summer Olympics. The C-1 event is raced by single-man sprint canoes. The final took place on December 1.

== Medalists ==
Gold	Silver	Bronze
Leon Rotman (ROU)	István Hernek (HUN)	Gennady Bukharin (URS)

== Results ==
=== Final ===
Ten competitors entered, but one withdrew prior to the event. With only nine competitors, a final was held.

Rank	Canoer	Country	Time	Notes
1st place, gold medalist(s)	Leon Rotman	Romania	5:05.3	
2nd place, silver medalist(s)	István Hernek	Hungary	5:06.2	
3rd place, bronze medalist(s)	Gennady Bukharin	Soviet Union	5:12.7	
4	Karel Hradil	Czechoslovakia	5:15.9	
5	Franz Johannsen	Germany	5:18.6	
6	Werner Wettersten	Sweden	5:28.0	
7	Bryan Harper	Australia	5:37.6	
8	George Bossy	Canada	5:39.4	
9.	William Schuette	United States	5:47.7	
