= Leon Rotman =

Romanian canoeist

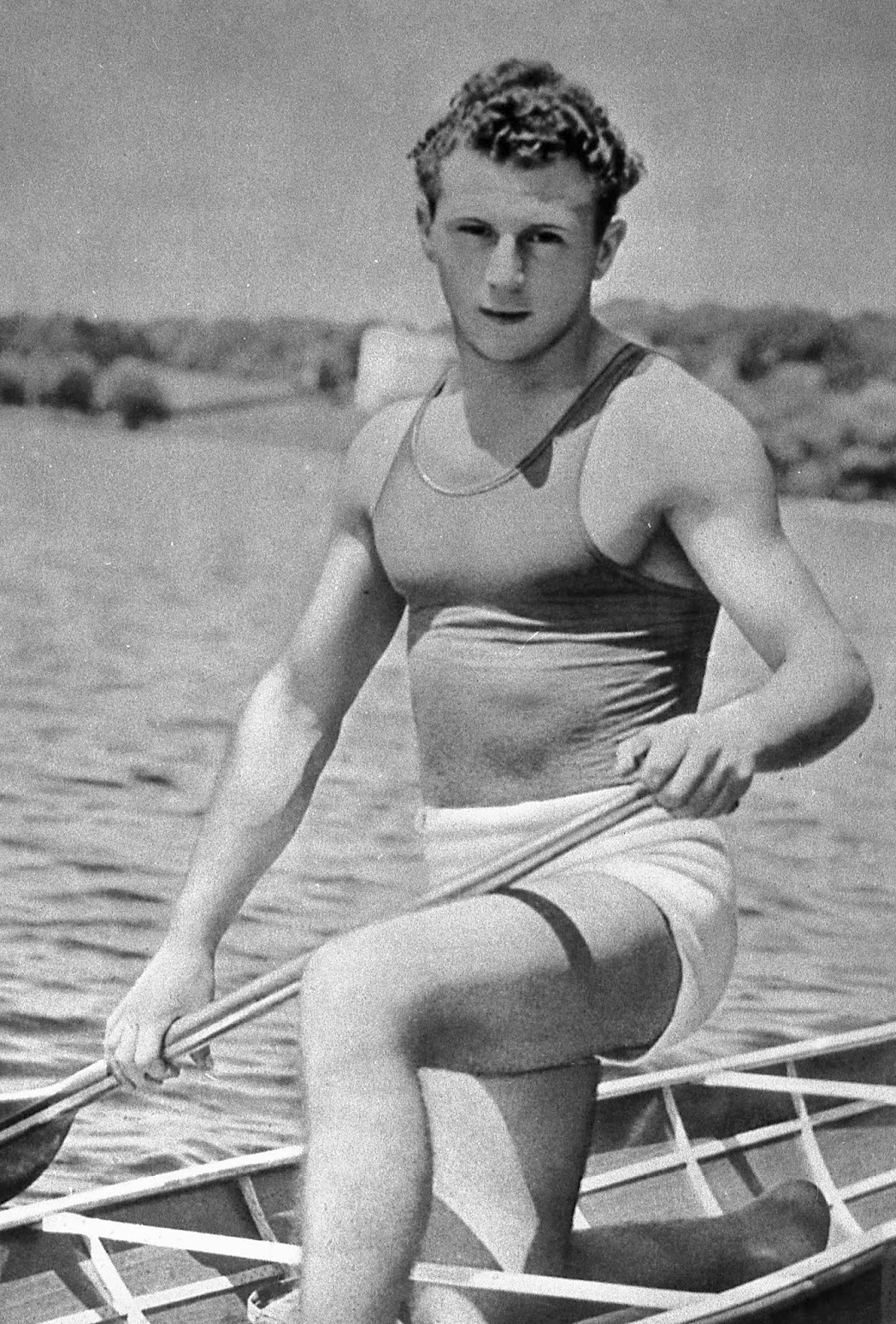
- Rotman in 1956

Personal information
- Born: 22 July 1934 (age 91) Bucharest, Romania
- Height: 171 cm (5 ft 7 in)
- Weight: 72 kg (159 lb)

Sport
- Sport: Canoe sprint
- Club: Dinamo Bucharest
- Coached by: Radu Huţan
Medal record
Representing Romania
Olympic Games
Gold medal – first place	1956 Melbourne	C-1 1000 m
Gold medal – first place	1956 Melbourne	C-1 10000 m
Bronze medal – third place	1960 Rome	C1 1000 m

Leon Rotman (born 22 July 1934) is a retired Romanian sprint canoeist. He won two individual gold medals at the 1956 Olympics and a bronze medal in 1960.

== Life and sporting career ==
Rotman is Jewish, and was born to a working-class Jewish family. He took up several sports in the years immediately after World War II and was fascinated by canoeing after seeing the famous Czech champions Jan Brzák-Felix and Bohumil Kudrna compete on Lake Snagov near Bucharest in 1953. He joined the Dinamo Bucharest sports club, in the hope of getting one of the Czech-made canoes left by the two in Romania. He did not, but he was remarked by famous coach Radu Huţan after becoming national champion in improvised canoes.

He would eventually compete at the Olympics on the first canoe ever made in Romania (at the factories in Reghin, Mureș County). At the 1956 Summer Olympic Games in Melbourne, despite having a sprained ankle, Rotman won both the C-1 1000 m and 10000 m events, equaling Swede Gert Fredriksson's performance who, at the same Olympics, won gold in both individual kayak events. He was the first Romanian to win two medals in one Olympics. At the next Olympics he won a bronze in the C-1 1000 m event. He was slightly less successful in other competitions (fifth in the 1957 and 1961 European Championships in C-1 1000 m, and seventh at the 1963 World Championships in C-1 10000 m). He won, however, the Snagov Regatta seven times and 14 national titles before retiring in 1963.

After retiring from competitions Rotman worked as a canoeing coach in Bucharest.

== See also ==
- List of select Jewish canoeists
