= Dennis van Valkenburgh =

American sprint canoer (born 1944)

Dennis van Valkenburgh (born August 16, 1944 in El Paso, Texas) is an American sprint canoer who competed in the mid-1960s. At the 1964 Summer Olympics in Tokyo, he finished eighth in the C-1 1000 m event.
