= Werner Wettersten =

Swedish canoeist (1923–2009)

Werner Wettersten (19 April 1923 – 15 August 2009) was a Swedish sprint canoeist who competed from the late 1940s to the late 1950s. At the 1948 Summer Olympics in London, he finished sixth both in the C-2 1000 m and C-2 10000 m events. Eight years later, Wettersten also finished sixth both in the C-1 1000 m and C-1 10000 m events.
