= Bryan Harper (canoeist) =

Australian canoeist (born 1927)

Bryan Leslie Harper (born 12 July 1927) is an Australian sprint canoeist who competed in the late 1950s. At the 1956 Summer Olympics in Melbourne, he finished seventh in the C-1 1000 m event and ninth in the C-1 10000 m event.
