= Kenneth Lane (canoeist) =

Canadian canoeist (1923–2010)

Personal information
- Born: August 16, 1923 Toronto, Ontario, Canada
- Died: January 22, 2010 (aged 86) Toronto, Ontario, Canada
Medal record
Men's canoe sprint
Silver medal – second place	1952 Helsinki	C-2 10000 m

Kenneth Lane (August 16, 1923 - January 22, 2010) was a Canadian sprint canoeist who competed in the early 1950s. He won a silver medal in the C-2 10,000 metres event at the 1952 Summer Olympics in Helsinki, narrowly beaten into second place by the French team.

== Biography ==
Kenneth Ralph Lane was born in Toronto, Ontario on August 16, 1923, the second son of Harry Jabez Lane, a London-born commercial artist, and Maude Lane. He and his brother Norman Lane became members of the Balmy Beach Canoe Club.

Kenneth Lane won his first Canadian championship in 1946 in the C1 event. In his career, he won 14 gold medals and 19 Canadian championships. Ken Lane, along with Don Hawgood won the silver medal in the Canadian Doubles, C-2 10,000 metres event at the 1952 Summer Olympics in a photo-finish, narrowly beaten into second place by the French team.

Kenneth Lane managed the Canadian canoe team at the 1967 Pan American Games and the canoe and whitewater team at the 1972 Summer Olympics, in addition to serving as an official at the 1976 Summer Olympics.

Lane continued to race in masters competition until 1991. He was inducted into the Canadian Olympic Hall of Fame in 2003.

Lane remained in the sport as an administrator, helping to found Canoe Ontario. Lane managed the Canadian national team in the 1967 Pan-Am Games and the 1972 Olympics. He was an administrator of the Western Ontario division of the Canadian Canoe Association from 1945 to 2000.

Lane won the R. Edgar Gilbert Award, the highest honor of the Canadian Canoe Association, as a builder, as well as the Queen's Jubilee Award for his volunteer efforts.

== See also ==
- Norman Lane
