= Gerald Marchand =

British competitive canoeist (1921–2005)

Gerald Denys Marchand (24 April 1921 – 26 March 2005) was a British canoe sprinter who competed in the early 1950s. At the 1952 Summer Olympics in Helsinki, he finished ninth in the C-1 10000 m event and was eliminated in the heats of the C-1 1000 m event.
