= Karel Hradil (canoeist) =

Czechoslovak sprint canoer (born 1937)

Karel Hradil (4 January 1937 — 23 May 2024) was a Czechoslovak sprint canoer who competed in the late 1950s. He finished fourth in the C-1 1000 m event at the 1956 Summer Olympics in Melbourne.

Hradil was born in Prague. Hradil went on to have two children, who were both involved in canoeing, as well as some grandchildren. He was the honorary president of the rowing and canoe club in Beroun. He died on 23 May 2024.
