= Jürgen Eschert =

East German canoeist

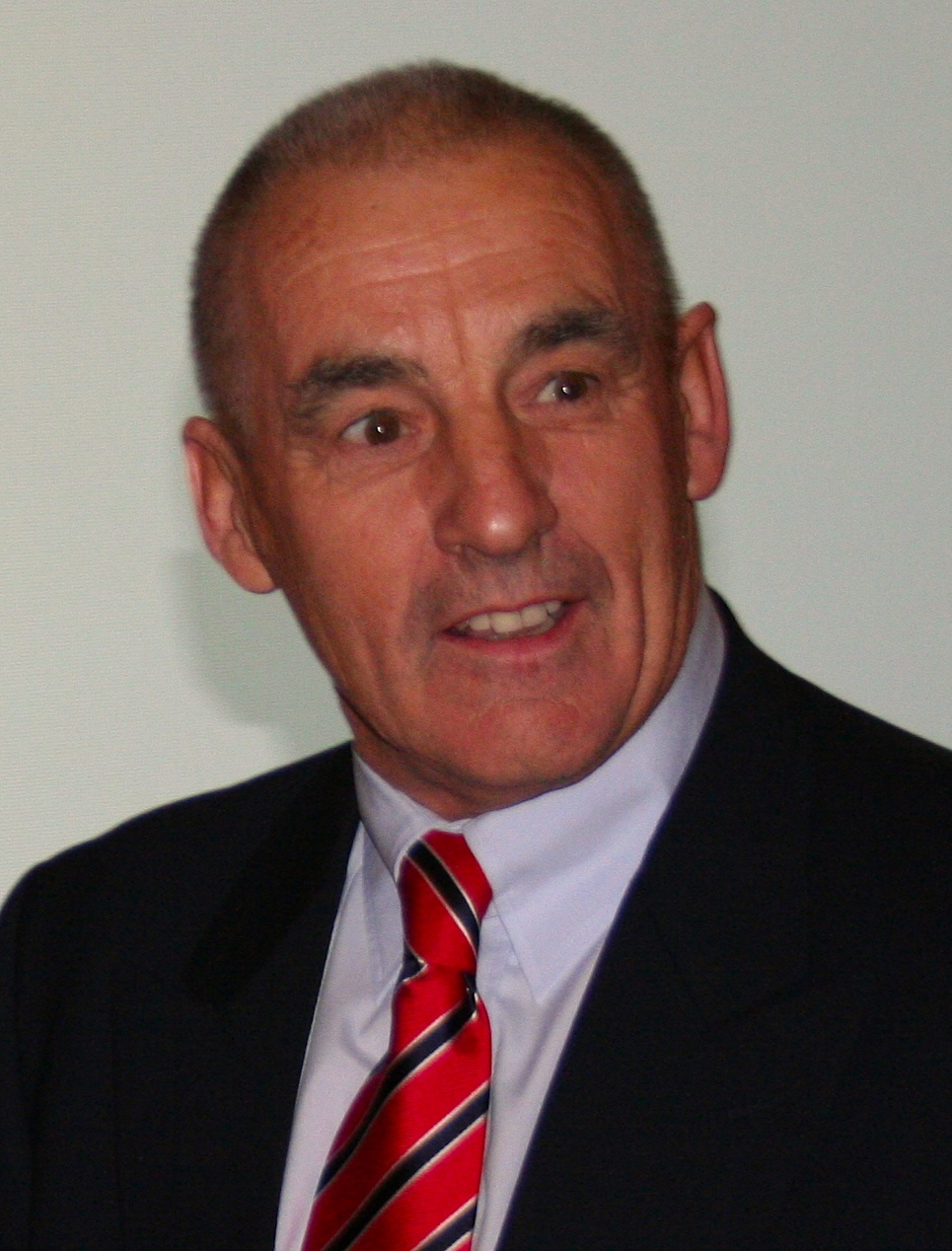
- Jürgen Eschert in 2011

Personal information
- Born: 24 August 1941 (age 84) Magdeburg, Germany
- Height: 1.76 m (5 ft 9 in)
- Weight: 73 kg (161 lb)

Sport
- Sport: Canoe sprint
- Club: ASK Vorwärts Berlin
Medal record
Representing Germany
Olympic Games
Gold medal – first place	1964 Tokyo	C-1 1000 m
European championships
Bronze medal – third place	1965 Bucharest	C-1 1000 m

Jürgen Eschert (born 24 August 1941) is a retired German sprint canoeist. Competing in the C-1 1000 m event he won a gold medal at the 1964 Olympics and a bronze at the 1965 European Championships.

In 1971 Eschert was expelled from the East Germany national team for wearing in public a T-shirt featuring the U.S. flag. He was a member of German military at the time. He retired from competitions and later worked as a coach and sports organizer. Eschert holds a PhD in physical education.
