= Gábor Novák =

Hungarian canoeist (1934–2021)

Medal record

Men's canoe sprint

Representing Hungary

Olympic Games
Silver medal – second place	1952 Helsinki	C-1 10000 m

Gábor Novák (14 August 1934 – 6 August 2021) was a Hungarian canoe sprinter who competed in the early 1950s. He won a silver medal in the C-1 10000 m event at the 1952 Summer Olympics in Helsinki.

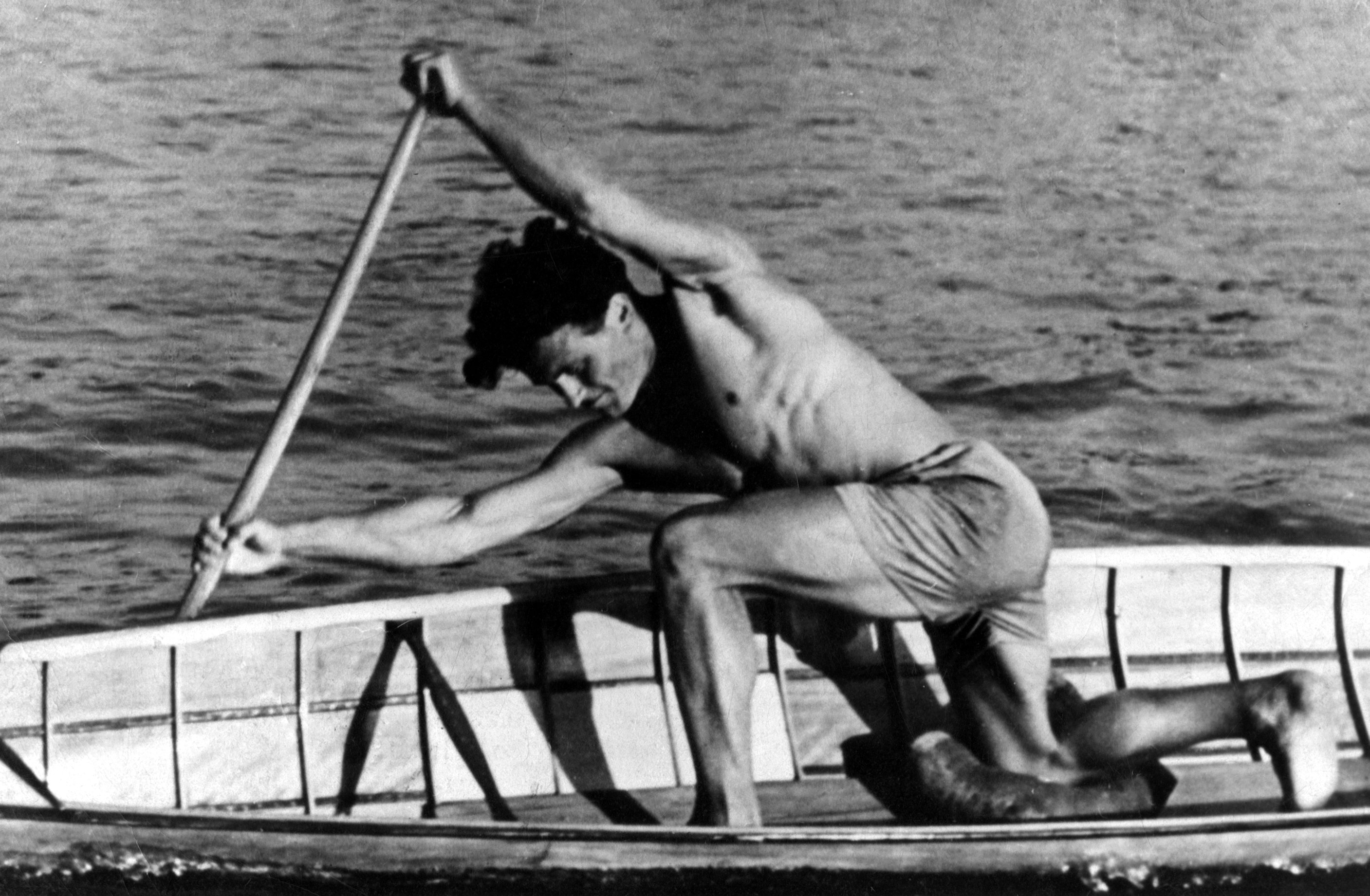
Novák Gábor
