= Gennady Bukharin =

Russian Soviet canoe racer (1929–2020)

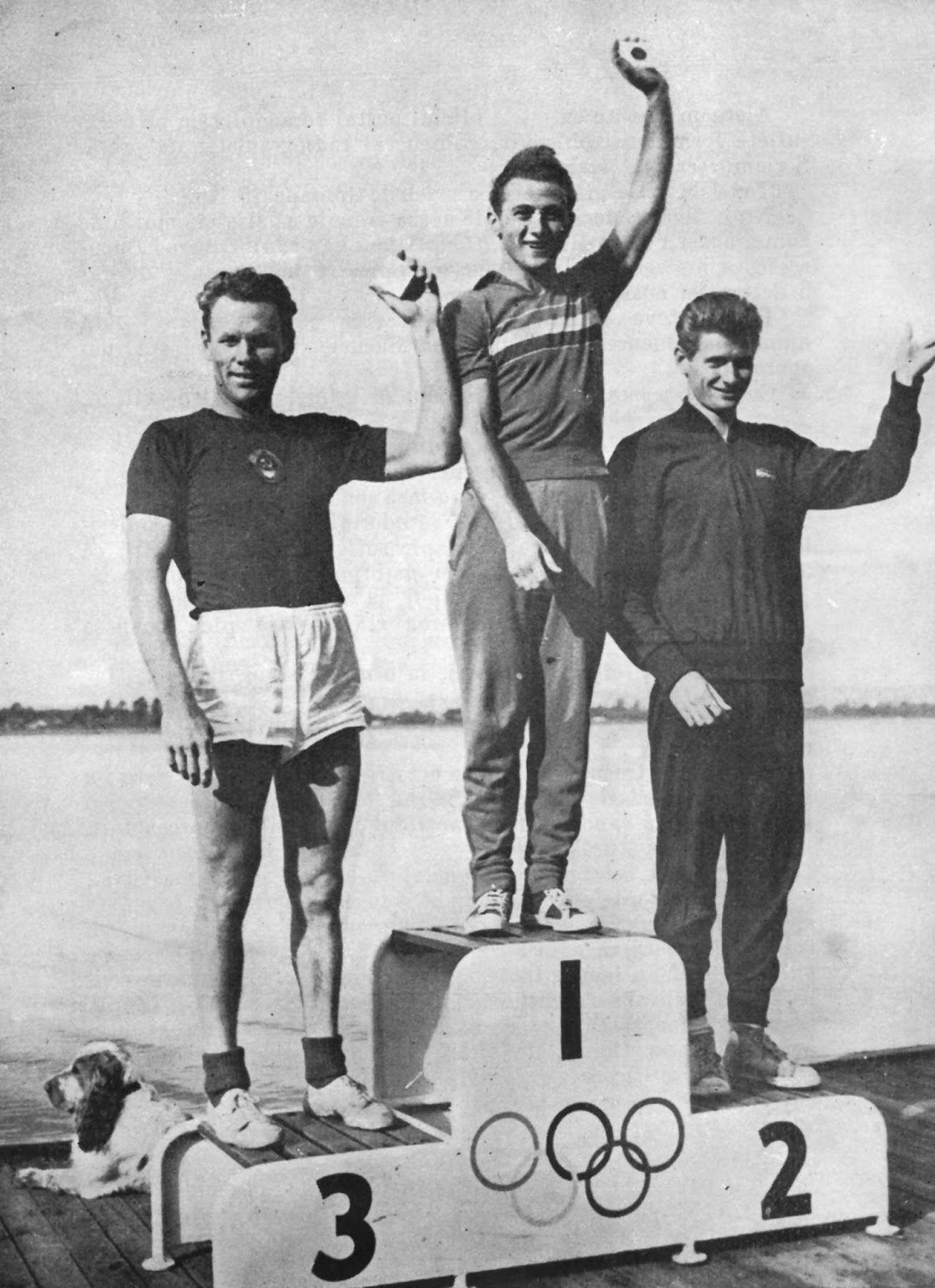
- Bukharin (left) at the 1956 Olympics

Personal information
- Born: 16 March 1929 Rybnaya Sloboda, Tatar ASSR, Russian SFSR, Soviet Union
- Died: 3 November 2020 (aged 91)

Sport
- Sport: Canoe sprint
- Club: Dynamo Moscow
Medal record
Representing the Soviet Union
Olympic Games
Bronze medal – third place	1956 Melbourne	C-1 1000 m
Bronze medal – third place	1956 Melbourne	C-1 10000 m
World Championships
Gold medal – first place	1958 Prague	C-1 1000 m
Gold medal – first place	1958 Prague	C-1 10000 m

Gennady Ivanovich Bukharin (Russian: Геннадий Иванович Бухарин; 16 March 1929 – 3 November 2020) was a Russian Soviet sprint canoeist.

He won the individual 1000 m and 10,000 m events at the 1958 World Championships and placed third in both at the 1956 Olympics.
