= Danz =

Danz is a German surname. Notable people with the surname include:

- Hailey Danz, American paratriathlete
- Ingeborg Danz, German mezzo-soprano
- Johann Traugott Leberecht Danz (1769–1851), German theologian and church historian
- Luise Danz (1917–2009), German concentration camp guard
- Tamara Danz (1952–1996), German singer
- Werner Danz (1923–1999), German politician

Danz is also the nickname of the American musician and producer Danz CM.
