= Harold Maidment =

British sprint canoeist

Harold Edward Maidment (12 February 1906 – 11 March 1977) was a British sprint canoeist who competed in the late 1940s. He finished sixth in the C-1 1000 m event at the 1948 Summer Olympics in London.
