= Yevgeny Penyayev =

Russian canoe racer

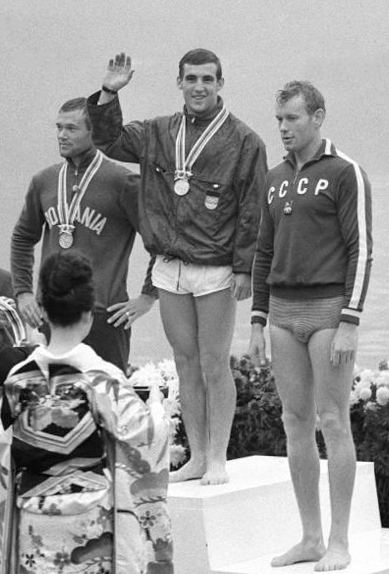
- Yevgeny Penyayev (right) at the 1964 Olympics

Personal information
- Born: 16 May 1942 (age 84) Moscow, Russian SFSR, Soviet Union
- Height: 1.86 m (6 ft 1 in)
- Weight: 80 kg (180 lb)

Sport
- Sport: Canoe sprint
- Club: Spartak Moscow
Medal record
Representing the Soviet Union
Olympic Games
Bronze medal – third place	1964 Tokyo	C-1 1000 m

Yevgeny Ivanovich Penyayev (Russian: Евгений Иванович Пеняев, born 16 May 1942) is a retired Russian canoe sprinter. He won a bronze medal in the C-1 1000 m event at the 1964 Olympics finishing 0.42 seconds behind the second place.
