= Aleksandr Silayev =

Soviet canoeist

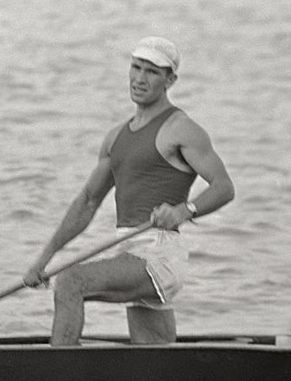
- Aleksandr Silayev at the 1960 Olympics

Personal information
- Born: 2 April 1928 Moscow, Russian SFSR, Soviet Union
- Died: 31 December 2005 (aged 77) Moscow, Russia
- Height: 1.87 m (6 ft 2 in)
- Weight: 78 kg (172 lb)

Sport
- Sport: Canoe racing
- Club: Dynamo Moscow
Medal record
Representing the Soviet Union
Olympic Games
| Silver medal – second place | 1960 Rome | C-1 1000 m |
World Championships
| Gold medal – first place | 1958 Prague | C-2 10000 m |

Aleksandr Pavlovich Silayev (Russian: Александр Павлович Силаев; 2 April 1928 – 31 December 2005) was a Russian sprint canoeist who competed for the Soviet Union in the late 1950s and early 1960s. He won a silver medal in the C-1 1,000 m event at the 1960 Summer Olympics, as well as a world title in the C-2 10,000 m event in 1958. At the European championships he won two gold and one silver medals (in 1957 and 1959) in the C-2 1,000 and 10,000 m events.
