= Jean Molle =

French canoeist

Jean Molle (30 May 1933 – 28 December 1975) was a French sprint canoeist who competed in the early 1950s. He finished seventh in the C-1 1000 m event at the 1952 Summer Olympics in Helsinki.
