= Alfréd Jindra =

Medal record

Men's canoe sprint

Representing Czechoslovakia

Olympic Games
Bronze medal – third place	1952 Helsinki	C-1 10000 m

Alfréd Jindra (31 March 1930 – 7 May 2006) was a Czech canoe sprinter who competed for Czechoslovakia in the early 1950s. He won a bronze medal in the C-1 10000 m event at the 1952 Summer Olympics in Helsinki. Jindra was born and died in Prague.
