= Josef Holeček (canoeist) =

Medal record

Men's canoe sprint

Representing Czechoslovakia

Olympic Games
Gold medal – first place	1948 London	C-1 1000 m
Gold medal – first place	1952 Helsinki	C-1 1000 m

World Championships
Gold medal – first place	1950 Copenhagen	C-1 1000 m
Silver medal – second place	1950 Copenhagen	C-1 10000 m

Josef Holeček (Czech pronunciation: [ˈjozɛv ˈɦolɛtʃɛk]; 25 January 1921 – 20 February 2005) was a Czech sprint canoeist who competed for Czechoslovakia in the late 1940s and early 1950s. Competing in two Summer Olympics, he won gold medals in the C-1 1000 m event in both 1948 and 1952.

Holeček was born in Říčany. In addition to his Olympic record, he won two medals at the 1950 ICF Canoe Sprint World Championships in Copenhagen with a gold in the C-1 1000 m and a silver in the C-1 10000 m events.
