= Jan Jiráň =

Czechoslovak sprint canoer

Jan Jiráň (19 June 1941 – 9 March 2017) was a Czechoslovak sprint canoer who competed in the mid-1960s. At the 1964 Summer Olympics in Tokyo, he finished ninth in the C-1 1000 m event.
