= Fred Wasmer =

Australian sprint canoeist (born 1938)

Fred Wasmer (born 7 August 1938) is an Australian sprint canoeist who competed in the mid-1960s. At the 1964 Summer Olympics in Tokyo, he was eliminated in the semifinals of both the C-1 1000 m and C-2 1000 m events.
