= Klaus Lahti =

Finnish sports shooter

Personal information
- Born: 9 July 1909 Hollola, Finland
- Died: 19 December 2003 (aged 94) Helsinki, Finland

Sport
- Sport: Sports shooting

Klaus Lahti (7 July 1909 – 19 December 2003) was a Finnish sports shooter. He competed at the 1948 Summer Olympics and 1952 Summer Olympics.
