= Joanna de Tuscan Harding =

American fencer

Joanna de Tuscan
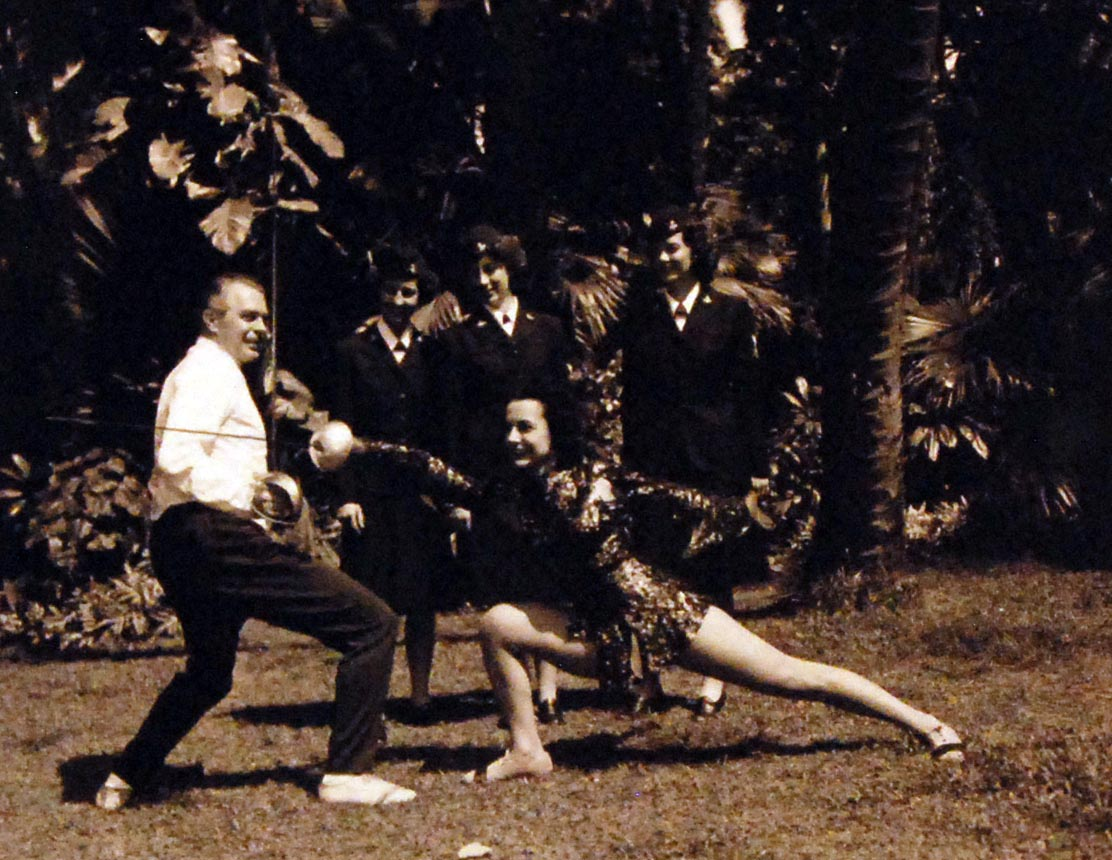
- De Tuscan, center, husband Bela, left, with the USO at Waikiki Beach in 1945

Personal information
- Born: April 30, 1908 Detroit, Michigan, United States
- Died: December 26, 2003 (aged 95) Los Angeles, California, United States

Sport
- Sport: Fencing

Joanna Savich de Tuscan Harding (April 30, 1908 – December 26, 2003) was an American Olympic foil fencer who competed in the 1936 Summer Olympics in Berlin.

Born April 30, 1908, in Detroit, Michigan, de Tuscan graduated from Highland Park High School. After high school, she attended an arts and crafts school in Detroit and began designing and selling jewelry. Later, she attended the Rhode Island School of Design and studied portrait painting.

De Tuscan started fencing in Detroit at age 17 after being introduced to Bela de Tuscan, who, in 1931, became her husband. She soon won the Michigan state fencing title and became the Midwest section champion. She also was the first woman in fencing history to compete in pants. To advance her fencing, de Tuscan travelled to New York to train with Giorgio Santelli.

Leading up to the 1936 Olympic Games, de Tuscan won the Amateur Fencers League of America title in foils in 1936. She went on to compete in the women's foil at the Olympics.

After the Olympics, de Tuscan fenced in exhibitions and performed in theatrical fencing with sabres in London. She was the first woman to fence sabre. She has sponsored several companies, including Maxwell House Coffee, Camel Cigarettes, and Wheaties.

Upon return to the U.S., de Tuscan suffered a car accident that caused an injury to her back. During her recovery, she moved to Southern California, where she later started fencing at local clubs, including the Los Angeles Athletic Club and Hollywood Athletic Club. She then began working in real estate and served as a fencing double in films. She also became the first woman commander of the Los Angeles Power Squadron, where she taught safety at sea courses and worked on charting for the Coast Guard.

In 2001, de Tuscan was inducted into the U.S. Fencing Hall of Fame.
