= C. Gregg Singer =

American historian and theologian

Charles Gregg Singer (1910 – 22 March 1999) was an American historian and theologian. He was born in Philadelphia, and studied at Haverford College, and the University of Pennsylvania. Singer taught at Wheaton College, Salem College, the University of Pennsylvania, Belhaven College, Catawba College, Furman University, and Greenville Presbyterian Theological Seminary.

Singer was involved in the formation of the Presbyterian Church in America, as the last President of Concerned Presbyterians, a layman's group within the Presbyterian Church in the United States. Singer left the PCUS in 1975, and joined the Associate Reformed Presbyterian Church, before finally joining the PCA in 1987.

Singer is best known for his 1964 work, A Theological Interpretation of American History. In it he argued that only "in the light of the Christian revelation can American history be brought into proper perspective."
