= Coy Koopal =

Dutch footballer (1932–2003)

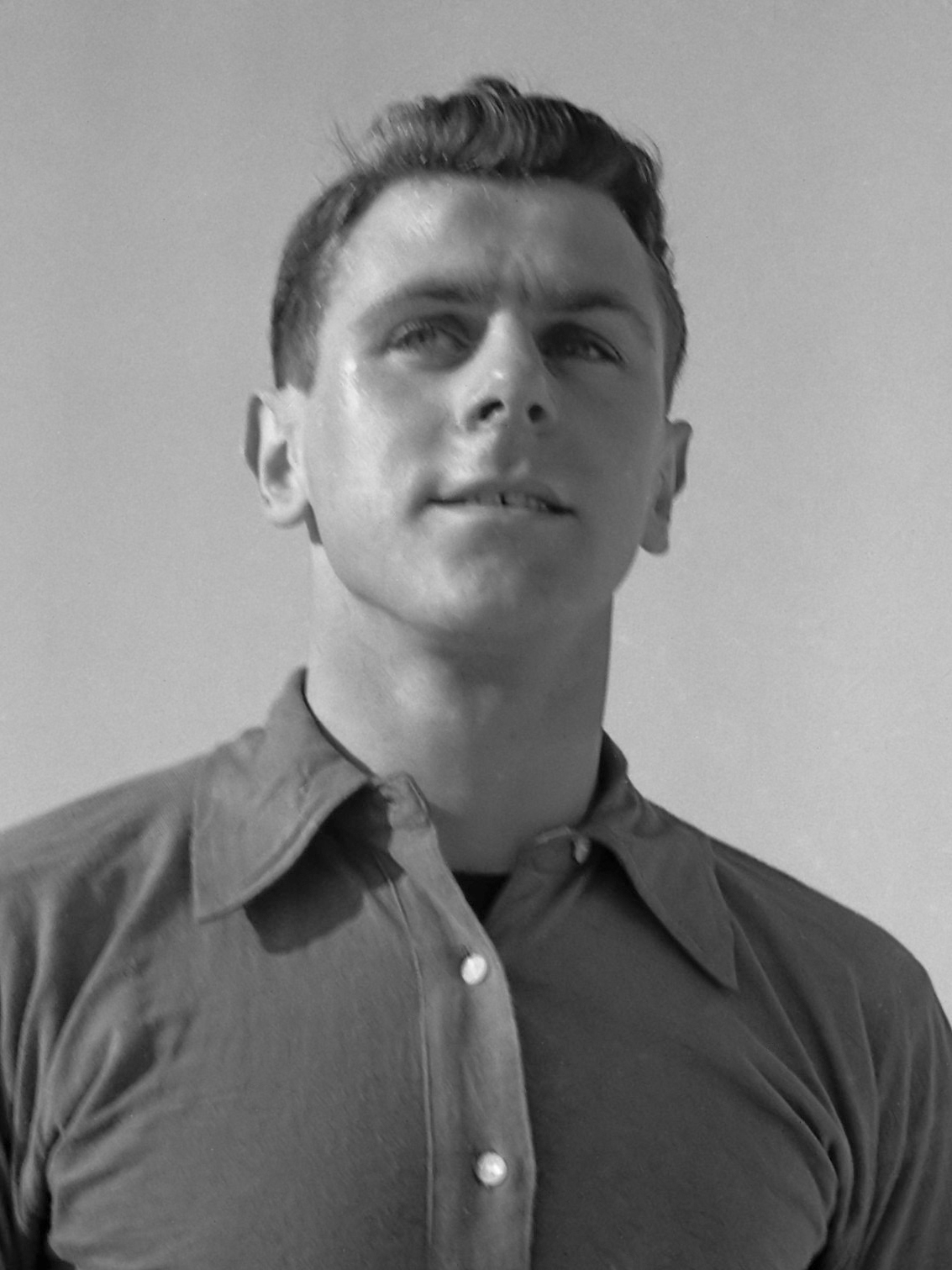
- Koopal at his debut with the Orange (1956)

Personal information
- Full name: Cornelis Jan Marinus Koopal
- Date of birth: 22 July 1932
- Place of birth: Blerick, Netherlands
- Date of death: 2 December 2003 (aged 71)
- Position: Forward

Senior career*
Years	Team	Apps	(Gls)
1954–1956	VVV-Venlo		
1956–1964	Willem II Tilburg		
1964–1966	Fortuna '54		

International career
1956	Netherlands	6	(2)

Managerial career
- 1968–1972: RKVV Voerendaal
- 1972–1973: Heerlen Sport
- 1975–1978: BSV Limburgia
- 1988–1989: RKVV Voerendaal
- * Club domestic league appearances and goals

Cornelis Jan Marinus "Coy" Koopal (22 July 1932 – 2 December 2003) was a Dutch footballer who played as a forward. He made six appearances for the Netherlands national team in 1956.
