= Hans Andersen (footballer, born 1925) =

Norwegian footballer (1925-1999)

Personal information
- Date of birth: 27 May 1925
- Date of death: 1 March 1999 (aged 73)
- Position: Striker

Senior career*
Years	Team	Apps	(Gls)
1947–1962	Lisleby		

International career
1949–1951	Norway	5	(1)
- * Club domestic league appearances and goals

Hans Andersen (27 May 1925 – 1 March 1999) was a Norwegian footballer who played as a striker for Lisleby, and the Norwegian national team.
