= Tibor Polakovič =

Czechoslovak sprint canoer

Tibor Polakovič (May 25, 1935 – November 23, 2002) was a Czechoslovak sprint canoer who competed in the early 1960s. He finished fifth in the C-1 1000 m event at the 1960 Summer Olympics in Rome.
