= George Bossy =

Canadian canoeist

Personal information
- Born: May 21, 1927 Winnipeg, Manitoba, Canada
- Died: October 29, 2012 (aged 85) San Jose del Cabo, Mexico

George Bossy (May 21, 1927 – October 29, 2012) was a Canadian sprint canoer who competed in the 1950s. Competing in two Summer Olympics, he earned his best finish of eighth in the C-1 1000 m event at Melbourne in 1956. Having moved to Montreal when he was young, Bossy was drafted by the Montreal Alouettes in 1952 out of McGill University and played one game with the Alouettes in 1952.

He died in San Jose del Cabo, Mexico on October 29, 2012. He is the uncle of Mike Bossy, a member of the Hockey Hall of Fame.
