= Thor Lunde =

Norwegian footballer (1924-2002)

Personal information
- Date of birth: 19 November 1924
- Date of death: 27 November 2002 (aged 78)

International career
Years	Team	Apps	(Gls)
1948	Norway	1	(0)

Thor Lunde (19 November 1924 – 27 November 2002) was a Norwegian footballer. He played in one match for the Norway national football team in 1948.
