= František Čapek =

Medal record

Men's Canoe sprint

Olympic Games
Gold medal – first place	1948 London	C-1 10000 m

World Championships
Silver medal – second place	1954 Mâcon	C-1 10000 m

František Čapek (24 October 1914 – 31 January 2008) was a Czech sprint canoeist who competed for Czechoslovakia from the late 1940s to the mid-1950s. He won a gold medal in the C-1 10000 m event at the 1948 Summer Olympics in London.

Born in Branice, he also won a silver medal at the 1954 ICF Canoe Sprint World Championships in Mâcon in the C-1 10000 m event.
