= Wanda Włodarczyk =

Polish fencer (1925–2003)

Personal information
- Born: 15 July 1925 Jasienica, Poland
- Died: 21 December 2003 (aged 78) Katowice, Poland

Sport
- Sport: Fencing

Wanda Włodarczyk (Polish pronunciation: [ˈvanda vwɔˈdart͡ʂɨk]; 15 July 1925 – 21 December 2003) was a Polish fencer. She competed in the women's individual foil event at the 1952 Summer Olympics.

== Sources ==
- B. Tuszyński, H. Kurzyński, Od Chamonix i Paryża do Vancouver. Leksykon olimpijczyków polskich 1924-2010 wyd. Fundacja Dobrej Książki, b.d i m. w., str. 915, ISBN 978-83-86320-01-1
