= Alfred Gansiniec =

Polish ice hockey player

- Born: October 29, 1919; Katowice, Poland
- Died: March 20, 1999 (aged 79); Katowice, Poland
- Position: Forward
- Played for: OMP Giszowiec; Polonia Janów; Siła Giszowiec; Górnik Janów; Górnik Katowice; Fortuna Wyry
- National team: Poland
- Playing career: 1934–1939; 1946–1960

Alfred Konrad Gansiniec (29 October 1919 – 20 March 1999) was a Polish ice hockey player. He played for OMP Giszowiec, Polonia Janów, Siła Giszowiec, Górnik Janów, Górnik Katowice, and Fortuna Wyry during his career. He also played for the Polish national team at the 1948 and 1952 Winter Olympics, and the 1955 World Championship. Gansiniec was awarded the Order of the Banner of Work for his efforts.
