= William Schuette (canoeist) =

American canoeist

William Schuette (November 5, 1933 – September 21, 2002) was an American sprint canoer who competed in the 1950s. Competing in two Summer Olympics, he earned his best finish of ninth in the C-1 1000 m event at Melbourne in 1956.
