= Ove Emanuelsson =

Swedish sprint canoer (1941–2021)

Personal information
- Nationality: Swedish
- Born: 24 May 1941
- Died: 19 June 2021

Sport
- Sport: canoe racing

Ove Emanuelsson (24 May 1941 – 19 June 2021) was a Swedish canoe sprinter who competed in the 1960s. Competing in three Summer Olympics, he earned his best finish of fourth in the C-1 1000 m event in Italy during the 1960 Summer Olympics.
