= Kaushal Kishore (scientist) =

Indian polymer chemist

- Born: 31 December 1940; Uttar Pradesh, India
- Died: 2 March 1999 (aged 56); Bengaluru, Karnataka, India
- Education: Lucknow University; Deen Dayal Upadhyay Gorakhpur University
- Known for: Studies on thermochemistry and combustion of polymers
- Awards: 1988 Shanti Swarup Bhatnagar Prize
- Scientific career
- Fields: Polymer chemistry
- Workplaces: Deen Dayal Upadhyay Gorakhpur University; Indian Institute of Science
- Doctoral advisor: R. P. Rastogi

Kaushal Kishore (1942–1999) was an Indian polymer chemist and head of the department of inorganic and physical Chemistry at the Indian Institute of Science (IISc). He was known for his researches on thermochemistry and combustion of polymers. and was an elected fellow of the National Academy of Sciences, India, Indian National Science Academy, and the Indian Academy of Sciences. The Council of Scientific and Industrial Research, the apex agency of the Government of India for scientific research, awarded him the Shanti Swarup Bhatnagar Prize for Science and Technology, one of the highest Indian science awards, in 1988, for his contributions to chemical sciences.

== Biography ==
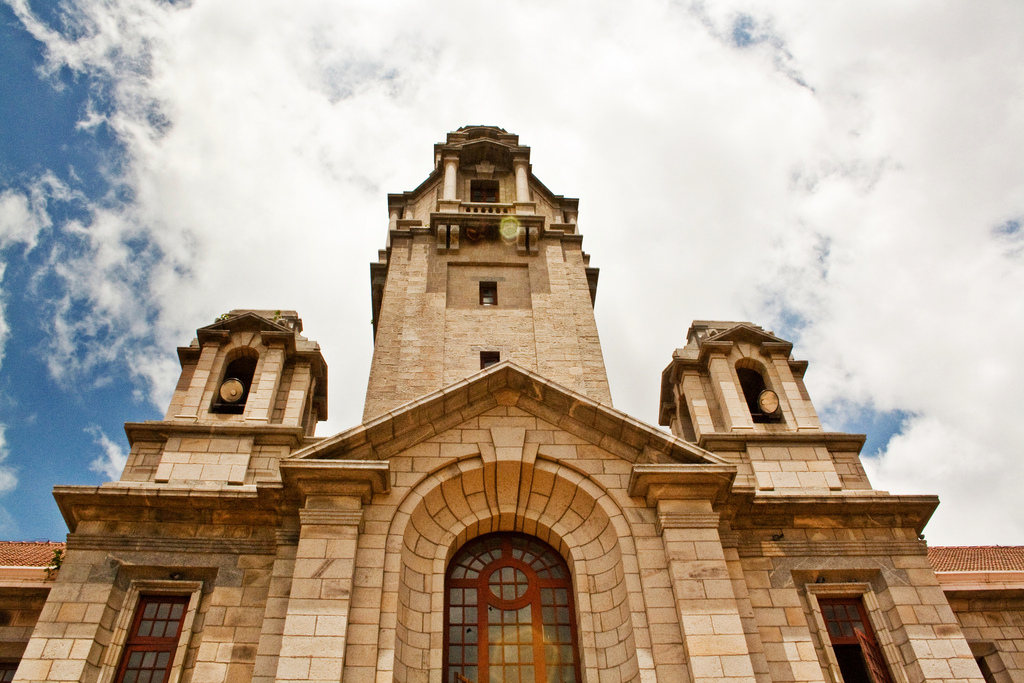
IISc - Main Building

Kaushal Kishore, born on the last day of 1942 in the Indian state of Uttar Pradesh, did his graduate studies in chemistry at Lucknow University and obtained his master's degree from the same institution before enrolling for doctoral studies at Deen Dayal Upadhyay Gorakhpur University where he studied under the guidance of R. P. Rastogi to secure a PhD for his thesis on mechanism of combustion of non-hypergolic propellants. His career started at Gorakhpur University as a teaching faculty but he moved to the Indian Institute of Science in 1974 where he rose in ranks to head the department of inorganic and physical chemistry from 1994. His early researches were on thermochemistry and combustion of polymers with focus on the kinetics and thermodynamics of combustion, particularly with solid propellants. These researches assisted him in discovering autopyrolysis, a term he coined for a phenomenon related to accelerated combustion caused by polyperoxides, details of which he published in one of his articles. He was credited with developing Flammability Index, a dimensionless quantity to assess the flammability of combustible materials. He also worked on plasticization and his studies have assisted in widening the understanding of plasticizers and flame-retardants containing phosphorus. He published several articles in peer-reviewed journals (Note: Please see Selected bibliography section) and the online repository of the Indian Academy of Sciences has listed 165 of them. He was associated with the Journal of Applied Polymer Science as a member of their editorial board and sat on a number of councils and committees.

Kishore lived in Bengaluru and it was here he died on 2 March 1999, the day of the Indian festival Holi, succumbing to a cardiac arrest at the age of 56.

== Awards and honors ==
The Council of Scientific and Industrial Research awarded Kishore the Shanti Swarup Bhatnagar Prize, one of the highest Indian science awards, in 1988. He received the Indian Thermal Analysis Award of NICAR in 1991. The Indian Academy of Sciences elected him as their fellow in 1991 and the Indian National Science Academy followed suit in 1999. He was also a fellow of the National Academy of Sciences, India. He was also associated with Indian Thermal Analysis Society, Indian High Energy Materials Society, Indian Polymer Society and Materials Research Society of India as their Life Member.

== Selected bibliography ==
- Palaninathan Kannan, Kaushal Kishore (March 1993). "New flame-retardant poly(pyromellitic imide aryl phosphoramide-ester)s". Macromolecular Materials and Engineering. 206 (1): 63–68. doi:10.1002/apmc.1993.052060106.
- Gangadhara; Kishore, Kaushal (1995). "Synthesis and characterization of photo-crosslinkable main-chain liquid-crystalline polymers containing bis(benzylidene)cycloalkanone units". Polymer. 36 (9): 1903–1910. doi:10.1016/0032-3861(95)90938-X.
- Murthy, K. Shanmugananda; Ganesh, Kannan; Kishore, Kaushal (1996). "Poly(styrene disulfide) and poly(styrene tetrasulfide) as chain transfer agents in the radical polymerization of styrene". Polymer. 37 (24): 5541–5543. doi:10.1016/S0032-3861(96)00463-6.
- Subramanian, K.; Kishore, K. (1997). "Application of polystyrene peroxide as a curative in coating and molding compositions". European Polymer Journal. 33 (8): 1365–1367. Bibcode:1997EurPJ..33.1365S. doi:10.1016/S0014-3057(96)00141-3.
- Jayaseharan, J.; Kishore, K. (1998). "Biomimetic aerobic polymerization of vinyl monomers". Journal of the American Chemical Society. 120 (4): 825–826. Bibcode:1998JAChS.120..825J. doi:10.1021/ja971335s.
- A. K. Nanda, K. Kishore (2002). "Synthesis, properties, and comparative analyses on the chain flexibility of an ultrastable vinyl polyperoxide". Journal of Applied Polymer Science. 86 (8): 2108–2114. doi:10.1002/app.11189.

== See also ==
- Plasticizer
