= Valentin Vdovichenko =

Soviet fencer

Personal information
- Born: 28 October 1928
- Died: 31 December 2003 (aged 75)

Sport
- Sport: Fencing

Valentin Vdovichenko (Russian: Валентин Петрович Вдовиченко, 28 October 1928 – 31 December 2003) was a Soviet Olympic fencer. He competed in the team épée event at the 1956 Summer Olympics.
