= Judit Kiss-Gerhardt =

Hungarian volleyball player (1941–2003)

Personal information
- Nationality: Hungarian
- Born: 1 February 1941; Tiszakécske, Hungary
- Died: 21 December 2003 (aged 62); Budapest, Hungary

Sport
- Sport: Volleyball

Judit Kiss-Gerhardt (1 February 1941 – 21 December 2003) was a Hungarian volleyball player. She competed in the women's tournament at the 1972 Summer Olympics.
