= Jack Jones (footballer, born 1916) =

Scottish footballer

Personal information
- Full name: John Jones
- Date of birth: 29 January 1916
- Place of birth: Gourock, Scotland
- Date of death: 11 March 1999 (aged 83)
- Place of death: Greenock, Scotland
- Position: Inside left

Youth career
- Morton Juniors

Senior career*
Years	Team	Apps	(Gls)
1936–1947	Third Lanark	67	(30)
1946	→ Bradford City (trial)	2	(1)
1947	Morton	0	(0)
1947–1948	Cowdenbeath	0	(0)
1948–1949	Stirling Albion	23	(12)
1949–1950	St Mirren	5	(1)
1950–1951	Kilmarnock	15	(10)
Total		112	(54)
- * Club domestic league appearances and goals

John Jones (29 January 1916 – 11 March 1999) was a Scottish professional footballer who played as an inside left.

== Career ==
Born in Gourock, Jones played for Morton Juniors, Third Lanark, Bradford City, Morton, Cowdenbeath, Stirling Albion, St Mirren and Kilmarnock. He trialled for Bradford City from Third Lanark between September and October 1946, scoring once in two Football League appearances.

Jones was part of the Scottish Football Association XI that toured Canada and the United States in 1939.

== Sources ==
- Frost, Terry (1988). Bradford City A Complete Record 1903-1988. Breedon Books Sport. ISBN 0-907969-38-0.
