= János Parti =

Hungarian canoeist

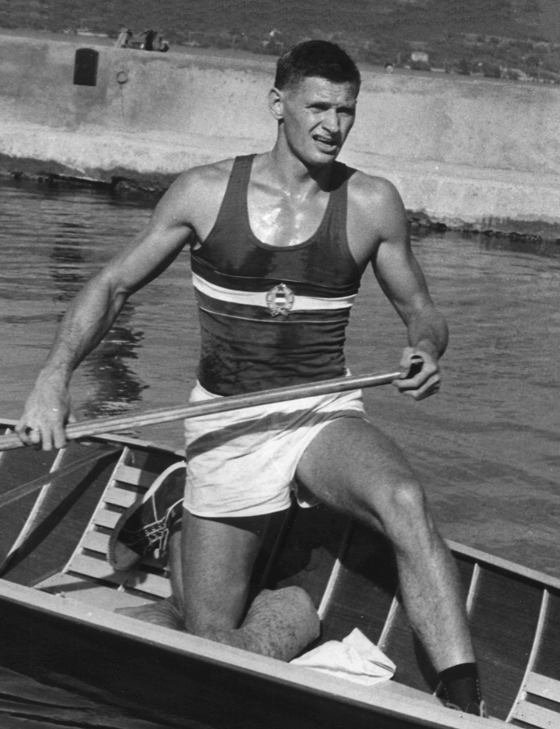
- Parti at the 1960 Olympics

Personal information
- Born: 24 October 1932 Budapest, Hungary
- Died: 6 March 1999 (aged 66) Budapest, Hungary
- Height: 1.82 m (6 ft 0 in)
- Weight: 83 kg (183 lb)

Sport
- Sport: Canoe sprint
- Club: Közalkalmazottak Sport Egyesülete; VTSK
Medal record
Representing Hungary
Olympic Games
Silver medal – second place	1952 Helsinki	C-1 1000 m
Silver medal – second place	1956 Melbourne	C-1 10000 m
Gold medal – first place	1960 Rome	C-1 1000 m
Canoe Sprint World Championships
Gold medal – first place	1954 Mâcon	C-1 1000 m

János Parti (24 October 1932 – 6 March 1999) was a Hungarian sprint canoeist. He competed in singles at the 1952, 1956 and 1960 Olympics and won one gold and two silver medals. He also won a gold medal in the C-1 1000 m event at the 1954 ICF Canoe Sprint World Championships in Mâcon.
