= Jarl Fagerström =

Finnish canoeist

Jarl Fagerström (12 April 1914 in Porvoo – 5 December 1975) is a Finnish sprint canoeist who in the early 1950s. He finished sixth in the C-1 10000 m event at the 1952 Summer Olympics in Helsinki.
