= Ernst Foreth =

Austrian footballer

Personal information
- Full name: Ernst Josef Foreth
- Date of birth: 24 February 1925
- Date of death: 9 March 1999 (aged 74)
- Position: Defender

International career
Years	Team	Apps	(Gls)
1956	Austria	3	(0)

Ernst Foreth (24 February 1925 – 9 March 1999) was an Austrian footballer. He played in three matches for the Austria national football team in 1956.
