= Skip Wolters =

Singaporean water polo player

Personal information
- Nationality: Singaporean
- Born: 23 November 1929
- Died: 12 December 2003 (aged 74)

Sport
- Sport: Water polo

Alexander Nicolaas "Skip" Wolters (23 November 1929 – 12 December 2003) was a Singaporean water polo player. He competed in the men's tournament at the 1956 Summer Olympics.
