= Danilo Tognon =

Italian canoeist (born 1937)

Danilo Tognon (born October 9, 1937 in Padua) is an Italian sprint canoer who competed in the early 1960s. He was eliminated in the semifinals of the C-1 1000 m event at the 1960 Summer Olympics in Rome.
