= Vladimir Kotyrev =

Soviet canoeist

Vladimir Kotyrev (17 July 1931 –14 December 2003) was a Soviet sprint canoer who competed in the early 1950s. At the 1952 Summer Olympics in Helsinki, he finished eighth in the C-1 1000 m.
