= Franz Johannsen =

German sprint canoer (1921–2006)

Franz Johannsen (4 May 1921 – 11 August 2006) was a German sprint canoer who in the 1950s. Competing in two Summer Olympics, he earned his best finish of fifth twice (1956: C-1 1000 m, C-1 10000 m).
