= Bogdan Ivanov =

Bulgarian canoeist

Bogdan Ivanov (Bulgarian: Богдан Иванов; born July 22, 1937) is a Bulgarian former sprint canoer who competed in the early to mid-1960s. Competing two Summer Olympics, he earned his best finish of sixth in the C-1 1000 m event at Tokyo in 1964.
