= Olavi Ojanperä =

Olympic medal record

Men's canoe sprint
Bronze medal – third place	1952 Helsinki	C-1 1000 m

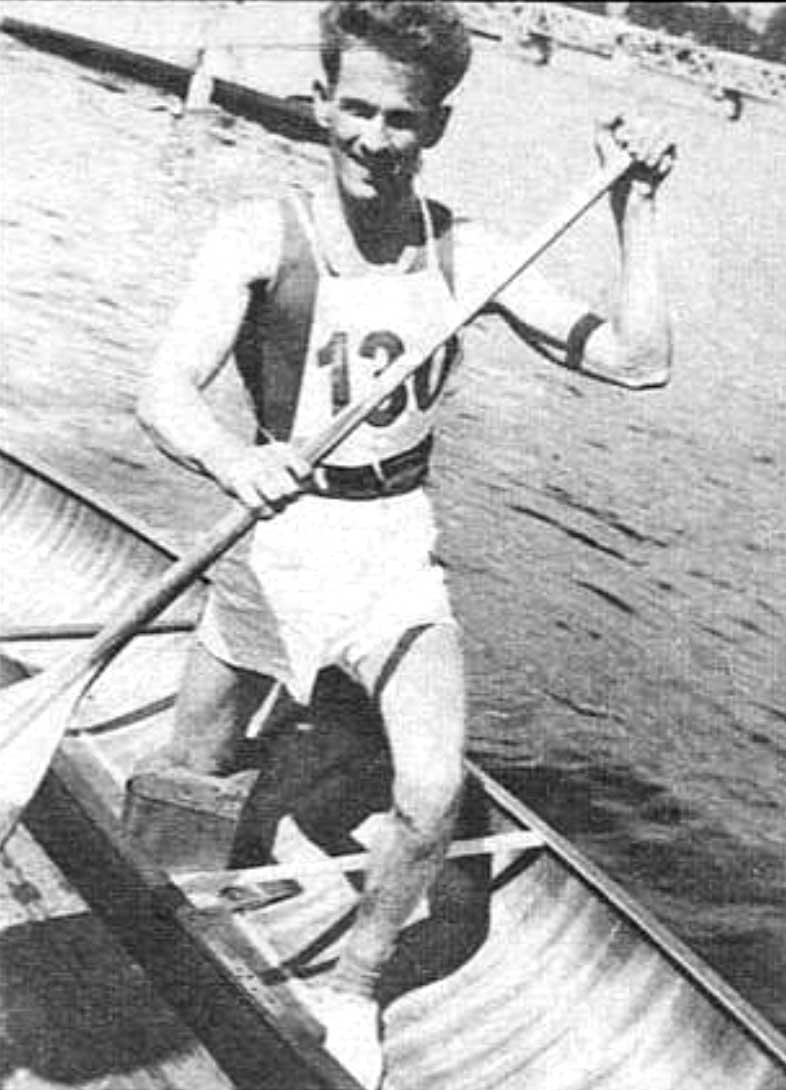
Olavi Portrait

Arvo Kalle Olavi Ojanperä (27 October 1921 – 8 May 2016) was a Finnish sprint canoeist who competed in the early 1950s. Competing in two Summer Olympics, he won the bronze medal in the C-1 1000 m event at Helsinki in 1952. He was born in Tyrvää.
