= William Havens =

American canoeist

William Dodge Havens, Jr. (January 29, 1919 – May 5, 2013) was an American canoeist who competed in the 1948 Summer Olympics.
