= Werner Danz =

German politician (1923–1999)

Member of the Bundestag
- In office 17 October 1961 – 17 October 1965

Personal details
- Born: 3 June 1923 Koblenz
- Died: 18 March 1999 (aged 75)
- Party: FDP

Werner Danz (3 June 1923 – 18 March 1999) was a German politician of the Free Democratic Party (FDP) and former member of the German Bundestag.

== Life ==
Danz was a member of the Bad Kreuznach city council from 1960 to 1969. In the 1961 federal elections he entered the German Bundestag via the Rhineland-Palatinate state list, of which he was a member until 1965.

From 1967 to 1983 he was a member of the Rhineland-Palatinate state parliament, where he was deputy chairman from 1967 to 1969 and then chairman of the FDP parliamentary group until 1982. In 1982/83 he was again vice-chairman of the parliamentary group. At the same time, he served as Vice-President of the state parliament. From 1979 to 1989, Danz was a member of the Bad Kreuznach district council.

== Literature ==
Herbst, Ludolf; Jahn, Bruno (2002). Vierhaus, Rudolf (ed.). Biographisches Handbuch der Mitglieder des Deutschen Bundestages. 1949–2002 [Biographical Handbook of the Members of the German Bundestag. 1949–2002] (in German). München: De Gruyter - De Gruyter Saur. p. 1715. ISBN 978-3-11-184511-1.
