= Ingemar Andersson =

Swedish sprint canoeist (1928–1992)

Ingemar Andersson (1 June 1928 – 17 July 1992) was a Swedish sprint canoeist who competed in the late 1940s and early 1950s. Competing in two Summer Olympics, he earned his best finish of fourth in the C-1 1000 m event at London in 1948.
