= Norman Lane =

Canadian canoeist (1919–2014)

Olympic medal record

Men's Canoe sprint
Bronze medal – third place	1948 London	C-1 10000 m

See also Norlane, Victoria, named after Norman Lane, an Australian serviceman

Norman D. Lane (November 6, 1919 – August 6, 2014) was a Canadian sprint canoeist who competed in the late 1940s and early 1950s. Competing in two Summer Olympics, he won a bronze in the C-1 10,000 m event at London in 1948. He competed in the 1952 Helsinki Olympics and finished fifth. His brother Ken Lane was a medallist at the 1952 Games in sprint canoe.

Born in Toronto in 1919, Lane earned a PhD in Mathematics from the University of Toronto, and was a distinguished professor of Mathematics at McMaster University from 1952 to 1987. He and his wife, Doris, had five sons: Douglas, Brian, Stephen, Alan, and Christopher. Lane died in Hamilton, Ontario on August 6, 2014, aged 94.

== See also ==
- Kenneth Lane (canoeist)
