= Frank Havens (canoeist) =

American canoeist (1924–2018)

Personal information
- Full name: Frank Benjamin Havens
- Born: August 1, 1924 Arlington, Virginia, U.S.
- Died: July 22, 2018 (aged 93) Harborton, Virginia, U.S.
- Resting place: Arlington National Cemetery
Medal record
Men's canoe sprint
Representing the United States
Olympic Games
Gold medal – first place	1952 Helsinki	C-1 10000 m
Silver medal – second place	1948 London	C-1 10000 m

Frank Benjamin Havens (August 1, 1924 – July 22, 2018) was an American sprint canoeist who competed from the late 1940s to the early 1960s. He was born in Arlington, Virginia. Competing in four Summer Olympics, he won two medals: in the C-1 10000 m event with a silver in 1948, and a gold in 1952. In Havens' first shot in the 1948 Olympic games, he finished second to Capek by 35.4 seconds in a canoe he borrowed from the Czechs. In 1952, his world record was set in a canoe he and his brother, Bill, imported from Sweden for about $160. He was the only American Olympic gold medal winner in a singles canoeing event until the 2021 Tokyo Olympics where Nevin Harrison won the C-1 Womens 200 m race. He was a member of the Virginia Sports Hall of Fame and an American Canoe Association Legend of Paddling. He died in July 2018 at the age of 93.
