= 2002 in baseball =

The following are the baseball events of the year 2002 throughout the world.

== Champions ==
=== Major League Baseball ===
- Regular Season Champions

League	Eastern Division Champion	Central Division Champion	Western Division Champion	Wild Card Qualifier
American League	New York Yankees	Minnesota Twins	Oakland Athletics	Anaheim Angels
National League	Atlanta Braves	St. Louis Cardinals	Arizona Diamondbacks	San Francisco Giants

- World Series Champion – Anaheim Angels
- Postseason – October 1 to October 27

Division Series; TV: ESPN/ABC Family/FOX
1	New York Yankees	1
4	Anaheim Angels	3
American League
2	Oakland Athletics	2
3	Minnesota Twins	3
1	Atlanta Braves	2
4	San Francisco Giants	3
National League
2	Arizona Diamondbacks	0
3	St. Louis Cardinals	3

League Championship Series; TV: FOX
4	Anaheim Angels	4
3	Minnesota Twins	1
4	San Francisco Giants	4
3	St. Louis Cardinals	1

World Series; TV: FOX
AL4	Anaheim Angels	4
NL4	San Francisco Giants	3

Click on any series score to link to that series' page.
Higher seed has home field advantage during Division Series and League Championship Series.
The American League Champion has home field advantage during World Series as a result of the pre-2003 "alternating years" rule.

- Postseason MVPs
  - World Series MVP – Troy Glaus
  - ALCS MVP – Adam Kennedy
  - NLCS MVP – Benito Santiago
- All-Star Game, July 9 at Miller Park – Tie game, 7–7 (11 inn.); no MVP selected
  - Home Run Derby, July 8 – Jason Giambi, New York Yankees

=== Other champions ===
- Caribbean World Series: Tomateros de Culiacán (Mexico)
- College World Series: Texas
- Cuban National Series: Holguín over Sancti Spíritus (4–3)
- European Cup (baseball): Neptunus (Netherlands) over HCAW Bussum (Netherlands)
- Japan Series: Yomiuri Giants over Seibu Lions (4–0)
- Korean Series: Samsung Lions over LG Twins (4–2)
- Big League World Series: San Juan, Puerto Rico
- Junior League World Series: Cartersville, Georgia
- Little League World Series: Valley Sports American, Louisville, Kentucky
- Senior League World Series: Willemstad, Curaçao
- Taiwan Series: Brother Elephants over Chinatrust Whales
- Intercontinental Cup: Cuba

== Awards and honors ==
- Baseball Hall of Fame
  - Ozzie Smith
- Most Valuable Player
  - Miguel Tejada, Oakland Athletics, SS (AL)
  - Barry Bonds, San Francisco Giants, OF (NL)
- Cy Young Award
  - Barry Zito, Oakland Athletics (AL)
  - Randy Johnson, Arizona Diamondbacks (NL)
- Rookie of the Year
  - Eric Hinske, Toronto Blue Jays, 3B (AL)
  - Jason Jennings, Colorado Rockies, P (NL)
- Manager of the Year Award
  - Mike Scioscia, Anaheim Angels (AL)
  - Tony La Russa, St. Louis Cardinals (NL)
- Woman Executive of the Year (major or minor league): Brenda Yoder, Greenville Braves, Southern League

== MLB statistical leaders ==
	American League		National League
Type	Name	Stat	Name	Stat
AVG	Manny Ramírez BOS	.349	Barry Bonds SF	.370
HR	Alex Rodriguez TEX	57	Sammy Sosa CHC	49
RBI	Alex Rodriguez TEX	142	Lance Berkman HOU	128
Wins	Barry Zito OAK	23	Randy Johnson AZ	24
ERA	Pedro Martínez BOS	2.26	Randy Johnson AZ	2.32
Ks	Pedro Martínez BOS	239	Randy Johnson AZ	334

== Major league baseball final standings ==
American League
Rank	Club	Wins	Losses	Win %	GB
East
1st	New York Yankees	103	58	.640	--
2nd	Boston Red Sox	93	69	.574	10.5
3rd	Toronto Blue Jays	78	84	.481	25.5
4th	Baltimore Orioles	67	95	.414	36.5
5th	Tampa Bay Devil Rays	55	106	.342	48.0
Central
1st	Minnesota Twins	94	67	.584	--
2nd	Chicago White Sox	81	81	.500	13.5
3rd	Cleveland Indians	74	88	.457	20.5
4th	Kansas City Royals	62	100	.383	32.5
5th	Detroit Tigers	55	106	.342	39.0
West
1st	Oakland Athletics	103	59	.636	--
2nd	Anaheim Angels *	99	63	.611	4.0
3rd	Seattle Mariners	93	69	.574	10.0
4th	Texas Rangers	72	90	.444	31.0

National League
Rank	Club	Wins	Losses	Win %	GB
East
1st	Atlanta Braves	101	59	.631	--
2nd	Montreal Expos	83	79	.512	19.0
3rd	Philadelphia Phillies	80	81	.497	21.5
4th	Florida Marlins	79	83	.488	23.0
5th	New York Mets	75	86	.466	26.5
Central
1st	St. Louis Cardinals	97	65	.599	--
2nd	Houston Astros	84	78	.519	13.0
3rd	Cincinnati Reds	78	84	.481	19.0
4th	Pittsburgh Pirates	72	89	.447	24.5
5th	Chicago Cubs	67	95	.414	30.0
6th	Milwaukee Brewers	56	106	.346	41.0
West
1st	Arizona Diamondbacks	98	64	.605	--
2nd	San Francisco Giants *	95	66	.590	2.5
3rd	Los Angeles Dodgers	92	70	.568	6.0
4th	Colorado Rockies	73	89	.451	25.0
5th	San Diego Padres	66	96	.407	32.0

- The asterisk denotes the club that won the wild card for its respective league.

== Events ==
=== January ===
- January 8 – Ozzie Smith is elected to the Baseball Hall of Fame in his first year of eligibility. Smith, named on 91.7 percent of the ballots, became the 37th player in baseball history in being elected to be elected to the hall in his first year on the ballot.

=== February ===
- February 11 – Major League Baseball owners approve the sales of the Florida Marlins and Montreal Expos clubs. Marlins owner, John Henry, is selling the team to Jeffrey Loria for $158.5 million, while Loria is selling the Expos to Baseball Expos LP, a limited partnership owned by the other 29 MLB teams, for $120 million.
- February 12 – New York Mets assistant general manager Omar Minaya is named general manager of the Montreal Expos, Minaya, a native from the Dominican Republic, becomes the first Hispanic by accepting the GM position in Major League Baseball history. Hall of Fame player-manager Frank Robinson is also announced as the manager of the Expos, which will be run by MLB during the 2002 season.
- February 27 – The sale of the Boston Red Sox to a group headed by John Henry becomes official.

=== March ===
- March 1 – The Boston Red Sox dismissed general manager Dan Duquette and replaced him with Mike Port on an interim basis.
- March 5 – The Boston Red Sox dismissed manager Joe Kerrigan and replaced him with Mike Cubbage on an interim basis.
- March 11 – The Boston Red Sox hire Grady Little as their new manager.
- March 19 – The YES Network is officially launched, going on air at noon on this day. The first live event to be broadcast on the network that day was a spring training game between the Yankees and the Cincinnati Reds.
- March 22 – The Chicago Cubs send Ryan Jorgensen, Julián Tavárez, Dontrelle Willis and minor leaguer José Cueto to the Florida Marlins in exchange for Antonio Alfonseca and Matt Clement.

=== April ===
- April 2 – In beating the San Diego Padres, 9–0, the Arizona Diamondbacks became the first defending World Champions to open the season with back-to-back shutouts since the 1918-19 Boston Red Sox; the Sox shutouts were thrown by Carl Mays and Sad Sam Jones. Besides, the last team to start the year with consecutive shutouts was the 1994 San Francisco Giants. Curt Schilling is the winning pitcher against the Padres, following Randy Johnson's 2–0 two–hitter a day before.
- April 3
  - The San Francisco Giants defeat the Los Angeles Dodgers, 12–0, as Barry Bonds hits a pair of home runs for the second day in a row. Bonds becomes the second player in MLB history to begin a season with consecutive two-homer games. Previously, Eddie Mathews also hit a pair of homers in each of the Milwaukee Braves first two games against the Pittsburgh Pirates to start the 1958 season.
  - At Oakland Coliseum, the Oakland Athletics lose to the Texas Rangers, 9–6, as the Rangers score three runs in the 8th inning. The loss snaps the A's string of 20 straight wins at home stretching back to August 24. Oakland moved past the 1974–75 Cincinnati Reds for most consecutive home wins over two seasons, as the Reds mark was 17.
- April 5 – The San Francisco Giants defeat the San Diego Padres 3–1, in 10 innings, on Barry Bonds' fifth home run of the year. In doing so, Bonds ties the mark for most home runs in the first four games of the season, set by Lou Brock in 1967.
- April 7 – The Arizona Diamondbacks defeats the Milwaukee Brewers, 2–0, as Curt Schilling strikes out 17 batters in hurling a one–hitter. Raúl Casanova's 2nd–inning single is the only Milwaukee hit.
- April 11 – The Baltimore Orioles pound the Tampa Bay Devil Rays, 15–6, scoring a franchise–high 12 runs in the 6th inning. They also collect a club–high 11 hits in 16 at-bats.
- April 14 – Baltimore Orioles infielder Mike Bordick begins a streak which leads to a Major League record for the most errorless games [95] and total chances [431] by a shortstop.
- April 16 – The Detroit Tigers win for the first time this season, defeating the Tampa Bay Devil Rays, 9–3. The Tigers had lost their first 11 games for the fifth-worst start by a major league team.
- April 21
  - Rafael Furcal hits three triples to tie the modern major league record, as the Atlanta Braves defeat the Florida Marlins 4–2. The last player to accomplish the feat was Lance Johnson of the Chicago White Sox in 1995.
  - The Arizona Diamondbacks trounce the Colorado Rockies, 7–1, as Randy Johnson strikes out 17 batters in becoming the first pitcher this year to win five games. It is the sixth time that Johnson has fanned 17 or more batters in a game.
  - Making his first start in almost seven years, the Cincinnati Reds' José Rijo allows one unearned run in five innings as the Reds defeat the Cubs, 5–3. It is Rijo's first win since July 13, 1995.
- April 27 – Boston Red Sox pitcher Derek Lowe hurls the first no-hitter at Fenway Park since the 1965 season, when Dave Morehead no-hit the Cleveland Indians 2–0 before only 1,247 fans at the ballpark. Lowe shutout the Tampa Bay Devil Rays 10–0. It was also the first career complete game for Lowe, who began last season as the Red Sox closer. In his first start this year, Lowe hurled seven hitless innings against the Baltimore Orioles.
- April 29 – Former major league outfielder Darryl Strawberry is sentenced to 18 months in prison for violating the terms of his probation six times.
- April 30 – Al Leiter of the New York Mets earns a win over the Arizona Diamondbacks, to become the first pitcher in Major League history to record wins over all 30 franchises that have existed since 1901.

=== May ===
- May 2 – The Seattle Mariners rout the Chicago White Sox, 15–4, as outfielder Mike Cameron becomes the thirteenth player in Major League history to slug four home runs in a single game, all solo shots. In doing so, he becomes the first American League player in 43 years to accomplish the feat. Cameron is also hit by a pitch and flies out to deep right field in a bid for a 5th homer. Cameron and second baseman Bret Boone also become the first teammates in history to hit back–to–back home runs twice in the same inning, performing the feat in Seattle's 10–run 1st inning. The Mariners also tie a team record with seven homers in the game. James Baldwin is the easy winner, with seven innings pitched. There had only been 39 previous occasions of a player hitting two home runs in an inning, according to the Elias Sports Bureau. Eric Karros was last to do it, on August 22, 2000, for the Dodgers. Mark McGwire was the previous AL player to do it, on September 22, 1996, for Oakland.
- May 4 – Barry Bonds hits his 400th home run as a Giant, leading his team to a 3–0 win over Cincinnati. Bonds is the first player to hit 400 homers for one team and 100 with another.
- May 10 – The Anaheim Angels crush the White Sox 19–0. The Angels join the 1923 Indians, 1939 Yankees and 1950 Red Sox as the only teams to beat two opponents by 19 or more runs in the same season. Earlier this year, the Angels beat the Indians 21–2. The Anaheim victory over Chicago is just the 11th since 1901 in which a team scored 19 or more runs while shutting out its opponent, and the first such shutout in the AL since 1955 when Cleveland beat Boston 19–0.
- May 17 – With the New York Yankees trailing the Minnesota Twins by three runs in the bottom of the 14th inning, Jason Giambi hits a walk-off grand slam to give the Yankees a 13–12 victory.
- May 18 – During a rehab start with the triple A Pawtucket Red Sox, Manny Ramirez loses his $15,000 diamond earring while sliding into third base. About half his teammates on their hands and knees, along with the Syracuse grounds crew, are unable to recover it despite combing the third base area after the game.
- May 23

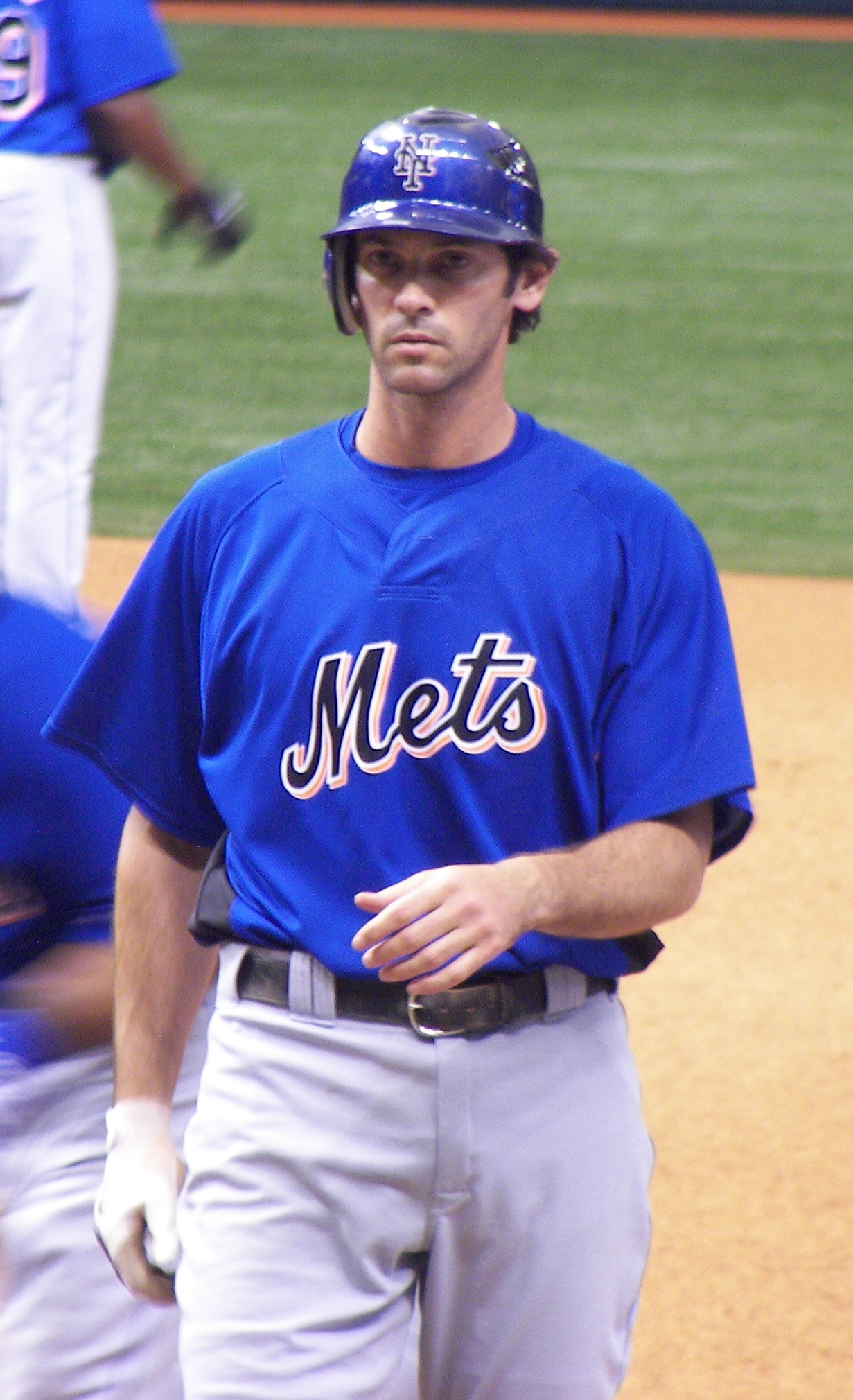
Shawn Green

  - At Miller Park, Los Angeles Dodgers outfielder Shawn Green becomes the 14th man in major league history to hit four home runs in a game and sets a big league record with 19 total bases. He goes 6-for-6, scores six runs (both Dodgers records), and gets seven RBI in a 16–3 win over the Milwaukee Brewers. Green is the second player this year to hit four home runs in a game. He also surpasses Joe Adcock's former mark of 18 total bases, set in 1954. According to the Elias Sports Bureau, six players have produced 17 or more total bases in a game, with the last being Mike Schmidt in 1976. Green also is the first major league player to collect six hits while hitting four homers, and his four homers plus a double ties the NL mark for extra base hits. The Dodgers hit eight homers in the game, another franchise record. Before today's power display, Green had gone 0-for-15, and had been benched May 18.
  - The Gary SouthShore RailCats played their first Northern League game on the road versus the Sioux Falls Canaries.
- May 24 – The Los Angeles Dodgers lose to the Arizona Diamondbacks, 14–3, despite Shawn Green's fifth home run in two games, tying a major league record. Green also hits two singles to tie another mark with 25 total bases in the two games.
- May 25
  - The Colorado Rockies beat the San Francisco Giants, 6–3, as Barry Bonds takes over sole possession of fifth place on the all-time home run list with the 584th four-bagger of his career.
  - The Los Angeles Dodgers top the Arizona Diamondbacks, 10–5, as Shawn Green hits two more home runs and drives home six runs. The seven home runs in three games is a new major league record.
- May 29 – In an article in Sports Illustrated, former National League MVP Ken Caminiti admits using steroids and says that about 50 percent of current major league players use some form of steroids.
- May 31 – Carlos Beltrán, Mike Sweeney and Joe Randa hit consecutive home runs in the top of the 11th inning to pace the Kansas City Royals to a 10–7 victory over the Texas Rangers. The Royals became just the second team in MLB history to hit at least three consecutive home runs in extra innings. On May 2, 1964, the Minnesota Twins hit four consecutive home runs, also in the top of the 11th inning, as Tony Oliva, Bob Allison, Jimmie Hall and Harmon Killebrew went deep in a 7–3 victory against the Kansas City Athletics.

=== June ===
- June 2 – Philadelphia Phillies pitcher Robert Person puts on one of the best offensive displays by a pitcher in Major League history. In his team's 18–2 victory over the Montreal Expos at Veterans Stadium, he hits two home runs and drives in seven runs. The first home run is a grand slam and comes off Bruce Chen in the first inning; the second comes in the fifth off Masato Yoshii with two men on base. In between, in the third inning, he barely misses joining Tony Cloninger in 1966 as the only pitchers to hit two grand slams in the same game; he strikes out to end the inning. With the second grand slam, Person, the first Phillie pitcher to hit two home runs in one game since Randy Lerch in 1978, would also have broken Cloninger's record of nine RBIs in one game by a pitcher, as well as become only the second pitcher to hit three home runs in one game, joining Jim Tobin in 1942.
- June 4 – The Minnesota Twins score 10 runs in the 7th inning to close out the scoring in a 23–2 win over the Indians, the largest margin of victory in Twins history. They stroke a franchise-record 25 hits (the team hit 24 five times while playing as the Washington Senators) in the contest, and tie their club record for total RBI with 22. They also tie the AL record as four players have four or more hits – Jacque Jones, Dustan Mohr, A. J. Pierzynski and Luis Rivas. Rivas scores five times to tie a club record. The Indians tie their team record for biggest loss, tying the mark set in a 21–0 loss to the Tigers on September 15, 1901. Cleveland also becomes the first team since the 1969 San Diego Padres to lose two games in the same season by 19 or more runs.
- June 10 – In an interleague game against the Arizona Diamondbacks at Yankee Stadium, Marcus Thames of the New York Yankees becomes the first player ever to hit a home run off a defending Cy Young Award winner in his very first Major League at-bat. The home run comes in the third inning off defending National League Cy Young Award winner Randy Johnson in the Yankees' 7–5 victory.
- June 18 – Jack Buck, Hall of Fame Broadcaster for the St. Louis Cardinals, passes away after months of hospitalization. He worked football games and playoff games as well—noted for his call in the 1988 World Series following the game-winning home run by Kirk Gibson and the 1991 World Series game winning "And we'll see you tomorrow night" home run by Kirby Puckett. On the date of his death, Darryl Kile pitched the Cardinals into a tie for first place, their first time at the top of the division since early April. It would be his final start before his sudden death.
- June 20
  - The Florida Marlins beats the Cleveland Indians, 3–0, as the Marlins' Luis Castillo extends his hitting streak to 34 games, the longest ever by a second baseman.
  - The St. Louis Cardinals drop a 3–2 decision to the Anaheim Angels at Busch Stadium following a memorial service for Jack Buck.
- June 22
  - St. Louis Cardinals pitcher Darryl Kile dies suddenly in his hotel room in downtown Chicago. When he didn't arrive at the ballpark, his room was checked. Kile had died in his sleep from 90% blockage of his arteries. He was 33. The game was postponed after the fans waited in the dark for an hour. Chicago Cubs catcher Joe Girardi (who later played for the Cardinals) made the announcement to the crowd that the game was canceled due to a "tragedy in the Cardinal family." The game was rescheduled for August 31 with the Cardinals winning 10–4.
  - In the 2002 College World Series, Texas defeats South Carolina 12–6 to win their 5th NCAA baseball title. It is the last College World Series championship to be decided by a single game before moving to a three-game format the following year.
- June 27 – Montreal Expos GM Omar Minaya sends P Cliff Lee, 2B Brandon Phillips, OF Grady Sizemore and 1B Lee Stevens to the Cleveland Indians in exchange for Ps Bartolo Colón and Tim Drew. Colón will win 10 of 17 starts for Montreal, but Sizemore with Cleveland and Phillips in Cincinnati will have solid careers for the rest of the decade.
- June 28
  - The Tampa Bay Devil Rays defeat their cross-state rival Florida Marlins, 4–0 behind Wilson Álvarez and two relievers. Kevin Millar of the Marlins hits a towering fly that lands on one of the catwalks that hang from the stadium's dome. It never comes down and is ruled a double. It's the second time a ball has gotten stuck in a catwalk at Tropicana Field. In 1999, José Canseco hit a home run drive that lodged there. Millar joins Ruppert Jones, Ricky Nelson, Dave Kingman, Álvaro Espinoza and Canseco as the only players in major league history to hit a fair ball that got stuck in a stadium obstruction; Jones and Nelson both had hits get caught in the overhead speakers at the old Kingdome, while the balls hit by Kingman and Espinoza were at the Hubert H. Humphrey Metrodome, with Kingman's getting stuck in a drainage valve and Espinoza's lodging in an overhead speaker.
  - The Chicago Cubs take an 8–0 lead over the Chicago White Sox at Comiskey Park behind Kerry Wood. After Wood hits Paul Konerko, the White Sox collect thirteen runs before allowing the Cubs to score one run late. Konerko had four hits, two of which were home runs in the 13–9 win for the Sox.

=== July ===
- July 2 – A combined total of 62 home runs are hit in today's games, breaking the old major league mark of 57 set on April 7, 2000. A record 9 players have multiple home run games, breaking the previous mark of 8 set on May 19, 1999.
- July 6 – Daryle Ward of the Houston Astros hits the first home run ever to exit PNC Park and land in the Allegheny River on the fly. The shot comes off Pittsburgh Pirate pitcher Kip Wells in the fifth inning of a 10–2 Astro victory.
- July 9 – In a controversial finish, the 2002 All-Star Game held at Miller Park ends in a 7–7 tie after 11 innings as both the National and American Leagues run out of pitchers. Both managers discuss it with commissioner Bud Selig, who calls the game.
- July 23 – Nomar Garciaparra hits three home runs with eight RBI on his birthday as the Boston Red Sox defeat the Tampa Bay Devil Rays 22–4, in the opener of a day–night doubleheader. The round–trippers give him five in two games to tie a major league record. Garciaparra also becomes the only player in major league history to hit three home runs in two back-to-back innings.

=== August ===
- August 7 – In a historic movement, major league players end their long-held opposition to mandatory drug testing by agreeing to be tested for illegal steroids beginning in 2003.
- August 8 – Braves pitcher John Smoltz reaches 40 saves in a season faster than any pitcher in major league history.
- August 9
  - The Giants' Barry Bonds hits the 600th home run of his career, but his team still falls to the Pirates by a score of 4–3. Bonds joins Hank Aaron, Babe Ruth and Willie Mays in the exclusive 600-HR club.
  - Vladimir Guerrero hits his 200th career home run helping the Montreal Expos beat the Milwaukee Brewers 11–4.
- August 10 – Sammy Sosa hits 3 home runs, helping the Chicago Cubs the beat the Colorado Rockies 15–1.
- August 11 – Sammy Sosa hits a grand slam and drives in five runs in the Chicago Cubs' 12–9 victory over Colorado to set an NL record for RBIs in consecutive games with 14.
- August 17 – The Yankees defeat the Mariners 8–3, as Alfonso Soriano hits a home run to become the first second baseman ever to join the 30–30 club.
- August 26 – New York Yankees shortstop Derek Jeter scores his 100th run of the season, joining Ted Williams (1939–49) and Earle Combs (1925–32) as the only players in modern history to score at least 100 runs in their first seven full seasons. Jeter scored again in the bottom of the eighth as the Yankees routed the visiting Texas Rangers 10–3.
- August 28 – Éric Gagné earns a save in a Los Angeles victory over the Arizona Diamondbacks. It is the first of his Major League record 84 consecutive save opportunities that he will convert.
- August 29 – First baseman Mark Bellhorn becomes the first player in NL history to homer from both sides of the plate in the same inning, doing so in the Cubs' 10–run 4th inning at Miller Park in Milwaukee. Chicago wins 13–10 over the Brewers. Bellhorn also ties a team record with five RBI in the inning.
- August 30 – Major league players and owners agree to a historic contract that prevents the players from going out on strike, marking the first time in over 30 years that a collective bargaining negotiation in baseball was met without a work stoppage.
- August 31 – The New York Mets are shut out by the Philadelphia Phillies 1–0, to mark their 13th consecutive home defeat. In doing so, they become the first NL team to lose all their home games over the course of a month.

=== September ===
- September 1
  - Jeff Kent of the San Francisco Giants becomes the first second baseman in history to record 100 or more RBI for six consecutive years. The Giants lose to the Arizona Diamondbacks 7–6.
  - Miguel Tejada of the Oakland Athletics hits his 30th home run of the season as Oakland beats the Minnesota Twins 7–5. Tejada is only the third shortstop in history with at least three seasons with 30 or more home runs and with 30 HR in three consecutive seasons. Alex Rodriguez leads in both categories with six such seasons, five in a row.
- September 3
  - The Mets lose the first game of their doubleheader against the Marlins 3–2, but bounce back to take the nightcap 11–5. The loss in the opener sets a new NL record for consecutive home losses with 15.
  - Texas Rangers reliever Joaquín Benoit pitches seven innings of one-hit ball against the Baltimore Orioles to record the longest save in Major League history.
- September 4
  - The Oakland Athletics set an AL record by defeating the Kansas City Royals 12–11 for their 20th straight win. Oakland blows an 11–0 lead, but scores in the bottom of the 9th for the victory. The old mark of 19 wins was shared between the 1906 Chicago White Sox and the 1947 New York Yankees.
  - Aaron Myette, ejected yesterday for two pitches behind Melvin Mora, starts today's game. According to The New York Times, it is the first back-to-back start by a pitcher since Steve McCatty in 1980, though five pitchers – Dennis Martínez, Bert Blyleven, Pete Vuckovich, Rick Langford and Juan Eichelberger – made their last start before the 1981 strike and their first start after.
- September 5
  - In a Texas 11–2 victory over Baltimore, shortstop Alex Rodriguez becomes the fifth player in major league history to record successive 50–home run seasons.
  - Drew Henson makes his major league debut pinch-running for Bernie Williams in the eighth inning of the New York Yankees' 9–3 victory over the Detroit Tigers.
- September 6
  - The St. Louis Cardinals defeat the Chicago Cubs 11–2, as brothers Andy Benes and Alan Benes oppose each other in the seventh matchup of brothers in major league history. Andy gets the win while Alan takes the loss. The Cardinals score all 11 of their runs in the third inning.
  - The Oakland Athletics' 20-game winning streak is snapped as Brad Radke pitches the Minnesota Twins to a 6–0 victory at home. The Athletics fall short of matching the second-longest winning streak in baseball history. The Chicago Cubs of 1880 and 1935 both won 21 straight.
- September 8
  - The Atlanta Braves win their 11th straight NL division title when the second-place Philadelphia Phillies lose to the New York Mets 6–4.
  - The Texas Rangers set a major league record by homering in their 26th consecutive game as Texas falls to the Tampa Bay Devil Rays 6–3. Rafael Palmeiro's solo shot in the sixth inning is the record–breaker. The streak will be ended at 27 games two days later.
- September 9 – Pitcher Randy Johnson reaches 300 strikeouts for the fifth consecutive season, extending his major league record.
- September 14
  - Pitcher Derek Lowe gets his 20th victory as the Red Sox beat the Orioles 6–4. Lowe becomes the first pitcher in major league history to win 20 games the season after saving 20. He is also the first pitcher to record at least 40 saves and later win 20. Dennis Eckersley and John Smoltz did it the other way around.
  - Barry Bonds ties Hank Aaron for the most 100-RBI seasons by an NL player as he drives in his 100th run of the season for the 11th time in his career. The major league record is 13, shared by Jimmie Foxx, Lou Gehrig and Babe Ruth.
  - Chin-Feng Chen becomes the first Taiwan-born player to appear in the major leagues as he walks and scores as a pinch-hitter for the Los Angeles Dodgers against the Colorado Rockies. The 24-year-old first baseman-outfielder played for the 1990 Taiwan team which won the Little League World Series.
- September 15 – Sammy Sosa joins Mel Ott and Willie Mays as the only NL players to post eight consecutive 100-RBI seasons.
- September 17 – Minnesota Twins outfielder Jacque Jones hits a lead-off home run against the Detroit Tigers, his eleventh of the season. That season total will place Jones second in AL history, only behind the twelve hit by Baltimore's Brady Anderson in 1996.
- September 18 – Arizona defeats San Diego 10–3, as Greg Colbrunn is the first player to hit two home runs in a game while hitting for the cycle since George Brett (May 28, 1979).
- September 20 – Shortstop Mike Bordick sets a major league record with his 102nd consecutive errorless game at shortstop. He also extends his major league mark of errorless chances at SS to 504.
- September 22
  - Greg Maddux joins Cy Young as the only pitchers in major league history to win 15 or more games in 15 consecutive seasons.
  - Fred McGriff becomes the first major league player to hit 30 homers for five different teams, and the first to homer in 42 different ballparks.
  - The Cincinnati Reds play their last game at Riverfront Stadium, losing 4–3 to the Philadelphia Phillies. Aaron Boone hit the stadium's last home run, and 1990 World Series hero José Rijo took the loss for the Reds.
- September 29 – Albert Pujols becomes the fourth hitter in the major leagues, and the first batter since Ted Williams in 1939–40, to collect more than 250 RBI in his first two seasons in the majors. Pujols drove in 257 runs in his first two campaigns. Joe DiMaggio holds the record with 292 RBI, Dale Alexander is second with 272, and Williams is third with 258.

=== October ===
- October 2 – Seibu Lions first baseman Alex Cabrera hits his 55th home run of the season, off Osaka Kintetsu Buffaloes pitcher Akira Okamoto, to tie the Japanese League record set by Sadaharu Oh in 1964 and matched by Tuffy Rhodes last year. Like Rhodes, Cabrera will see few good pitches for the remaining games.
- October 10 – The San Francisco Giants take a 2–games–to–0 lead in the NLCS with a 4–1 win over the St. Louis Cardinals. Jason Schmidt pitches shutout ball into the eighth inning while shortstop Rich Aurilia hits a pair of home runs with three RBI.
- October 13 – Adam Kennedy of the Anaheim Angels becomes the first player since Reggie Jackson in 1977 to hit three home runs in a single postseason game as the Angels defeat the Minnesota Twins to claim their first American League title in their 42-year existence.
- October 26 – The Anaheim Angels stage one of the great comebacks in World Series history to force a seventh game. With one out in the 7th inning, the Giants are leading 5–0 and are just 8 outs from their first World Series title since moving to San Francisco. But after two singles, Scott Spezio fouls off several pitches before hitting a 3-run homer to get the Angels close. In the bottom of the 8th, Darin Erstad led off with a home run to make it 5–4. After two singles, the Giants brought in their ace reliever Rob Nen. Series MVP Troy Glaus greeted him with a 2-run double to give the Angels a 6–5 lead. Reliever Troy Percival pitched a 1-2-3 ninth inning for the save.
- October 27 – The Anaheim Angels win their first World Series as they defeat the San Francisco Giants 4–1 in Game Seven. Pitcher John Lackey (with relief help from Brendan Donnelly, Francisco Rodríguez, and Troy Percival) becomes the first rookie to win a 7th game of a World Series since 1909. Garret Anderson's bases-loaded double in the third inning scores three runs for Anaheim to break a 1–1 tie and provide the margin of victory. Troy Glaus is named Series MVP.
- October 28 – Lou Piniella asks to be released from his managerial contract with the Seattle Mariners so that he may sign with the Tampa Bay Devil Rays.

=== November ===
- November 4 – It was a busy rookie awards day. First Eric Hinske of the Toronto Blue Jays was named American League Rookie of the Year getting 19 of the 28 first-place votes while the National League Rookie of the Year was won by Colorado Rockies' Jason Jennings who himself got 27 of the 32 first-place votes.
- November 6 – It was a busy manager awards day. First Mike Scioscia who led the Anaheim Angels to a 24-game turnaround from a 74-88 record in 2001 to a World Championship was named American League Manager of the Year, then Tony La Russa who led the Cardinals to 96 wins and overcoming with the deaths of Jack Buck and Darryl Kile to win the National League Central was named National League Manager of the Year.
- November 12 – Oakland Athletics shortstop Miguel Tejada, who receives 356 points from the BBWAA, including 21 first-place votes of the 28 cast, is selected as the American League MVP. Tejada joins countrymen George Bell (1987) and Sammy Sosa (1998) as Dominican Republic natives to win the award.
- November 22 – Houston Astros right fielder Richard Hidalgo is shot in the left forearm during a carjacking in Venezuela. He is released from the hospital and is expected to go to Houston for more tests.
- November 25 – The Boston Red Sox sign 28-year–old Theo Epstein as their new general manager. He becomes the youngest GM in major league history.
- November 26 – Prior to playing two regular-season games against the Oakland Athletics to open the major league season in Japan, the Seattle Mariners will face the Seibu Lions and Yomiuri Giants in exhibition contests on March 22 and 23 of spring training.

=== December ===
- December 2
  - In support of a national strike, the Venezuelan professional league suspends its games. Many of the eight teams in the league belong to news media owners opposed to President Hugo Chávez. When the strike continues, the league will cancel its season on January 13, 2004.
  - In the biggest free agent signing this year, the Philadelphia Phillies sign Cleveland Indians first baseman Jim Thome to a 6-year contract.
- December 29 – Riverfront Stadium, home of the Cincinnati Reds since 1970, is imploded. The team will start playing in Great American Ball Park next season.

== Books ==
- The Last Commissioner: A Baseball Valentine, an autobiography by Fay Vincent.
- Summerland, a novel by Michael Chabon.
- Win Shares, by Bill James, presenting the sabermetrician's new system for evaluating player performance.
- Moneyball, by Michael Lewis, presenting the A's statistical method to the 2002 season.

== Movies ==
- Bleacher Bums (TV)
- The Rookie

== Births ==
=== January ===
- January 11 – Elly De La Cruz
- January 12 – Anthony Molina
- January 17 – Zach Thornton
- January 17 – Tommy Troy
- January 18 – Brody Hopkins
- January 24 – Carson Tucker
- January 26 – George Klassen
- January 27 – Drew Cavanaugh
- January 27 – Ángel Martínez
- January 28 – Luis Matos
- January 29 – Ed Howard IV
- January 31 – Carter Baumler

=== February ===
- February 7 – Josh Ekness
- February 9 – Cesar Perdomo
- February 14 – Nolan Schanuel
- February 15 – Kyle Teel
- February 22 – Abimelec Ortiz
- February 23 – Cooper Ingle
- February 26 – Dylan Crews
- February 27 – Colson Montgomery

=== March ===
- March 1 – Hurston Waldrep
- March 2 – Logan Henderson
- March 6 – Charles McAdoo
- March 8 – Rhett Lowder
- March 12 – Luisangel Acuña
- March 12 – Bryan Ramos
- March 16 – Brice Matthews
- March 19 – Brett Bateman
- March 21 – Masyn Winn
- March 25 – Pete Crow-Armstrong
- March 25 – Wikelman González
- March 30 – Jacob Wilson

=== April ===
- April 2 – Nick Yorke
- April 3 – Connelly Early
- April 3 – Jacob Misiorowski
- April 10 – Thomas Saggese
- April 15 – Winston Santos
- April 16 – LuJames Groover
- April 22 – John Klein
- April 23 – Jesús Rodríguez
- April 28 – Hancel Rincon

=== May ===
- May 5 – Philip Abner
- May 7 – Yohendrick Piñango
- May 8 – Cole Carrigg
- May 9 – Khristian Curtis
- May 18 – Trey Gibson
- May 20 – Grant Taylor
- May 22 – Jordan Walker
- May 23 – Jonatan Clase
- May 26 – Petey Halpin
- May 29 – Paul Skenes
- May 30 – José Cabrera
- May 30 – Jacob Gonzalez

=== June ===
- June 1 – Jared Serna
- June 6 – Warming Bernabel
- June 16 – Nick Bitsko
- June 19 – Miguel Ullola
- June 21 – Kade Morris
- June 24 – Edgardo Henriquez
- June 28 – Kristian Campbell

=== July ===
- July 5 – Bo Davidson
- July 8 – Owen Caissie
- July 12 – Kevin Alcántara
- July 17 – Jordan Lawlar
- July 18 – John Peck
- July 22 – Sean Sullivan
- July 26 – Kyle Karros
- July 27 – Angel Chivilli
- July 30 – Jackson Jobe

=== August ===
- August 5 – Ryan Johnson
- August 7 – Marco Raya
- August 15 – Luke Keaschall
- August 18 – Ricky Tiedemann
- August 25 – Max Muncy
- August 25 – Ethan Pecko
- August 28 – Travis Bazzana
- August 29 – Evan Carter
- August 30 – Andrew Sears

=== September ===
- September 3 – Javier Sanoja
- September 10 – JJ Wetherholt
- September 14 – Bubba Chandler
- September 17 – James Wood
- September 24 – Luis Morales
- September 25 – Wilber Dotel

=== October ===
- October 7 – Ryan Waldschmidt
- October 8 – Jeferson Quero
- October 10 – Alejandro Osuna
- October 21 – Christian Moore
- October 29 – Maximo Acosta

=== November ===
- November 1 – Payton Tolle
- November 20 – AJ Smith-Shawver
- November 26 – Kendry Rojas
- November 30 – Daylen Lile

=== December ===
- December 10 – Matt Wilkinson
- December 11 – Jhostynxon Garcia
- December 12 – Marcelo Mayer
- December 19 – Blaze Jordan
- December 21 – Cristian Mena
- December 27 – Joe Mack
- December 29 – Kaelen Culpepper

== Deaths ==
=== January ===
- January 2 – Bob Stevens, 85, sportswriter for the San Francisco Chronicle for over 40 years.
- January 3 – Al Smith, 73, three-time All-Star outfielder who, after three seasons in the Negro leagues, spent 12 years (1953–1964) in the American League with four different clubs, chiefly the Cleveland Indians and Chicago White Sox; member of two pennant-winners: the 1954 Indians, who won a then-AL record 111 games, and 1959 White Sox.
- January 4 – Adrián Zabala, 85, Cuban pitcher who played for the New York Giants in the 1945 and 1949 seasons, and also one of the players barred from organized baseball in 1946 by Commissioner of Baseball Happy Chandler for jumping to the Mexican League.
- January 6 – Fred Taylor, 77, first baseman who played from 1950 through 1952 for the Washington Senators.
- January 7 – Hal Marnie, 83, backup infielder who played for the Philadelphia Phillies in part of three seasons spanning 1940–1942.
- January 18 – Quincy Smith, 83, outfielder for the 1943 Cleveland Buckeyes and 1947 Birmingham Black Barons of the Negro American League who later played six seasons in racially integrated "Organized Baseball" minor leagues.
- January 24 – Irene Kotowicz, 82, All-American Girls Professional Baseball League pitcher.
- January 24 – Tommy Sampson, 89, All-Star second baseman (1940–1947) and player-manager (1946–1947) of the Birmingham Black Barons; signed teenager and future Hall-of-Famer Willie Mays to Mays' first pro contract.
- January 26 – Ray Yochim, 79, who played for the St. Louis Cardinals from 1948 to 1949.
- January 27 – Reggie Sanders, 52, first baseman for the 1974 Detroit Tigers, who hit a home run off pitcher Catfish Hunter in his first major league at bat.
- January 31 – Harry Chiti, 69, catcher for the Chicago Cubs, Kansas City Athletics, Detroit Tigers and New York Mets in a span of ten seasons from 1950 to 1962; regarded as a specialist in catching knuckleball pitchers.

=== February ===
- February 2 – Andy Hansen, 77, pitcher who played for the New York Giants and Philadelphia Phillies over all or parts of nine seasons from 1944 to 1953.
- February 3 – Mel McGaha, 75, manager of the Cleveland Indians (1962) and Kansas City Athletics (June 12, 1964 to May 15, 1965); coached for Indians (1961), Athletics (1963 to June 11, 1964) and Houston Astros (1968–1970).
- February 8 – Steve Roser, 84, pitcher who played from 1944 to 1946 for the New York Yankees and Boston Braves.
- February 10 – Chet Clemens, 84, outfielder who played in 28 career games for the Boston Bees/Braves in two separate stints (1939 and 1944).
- February 10 – Jim Spencer, 54, All-Star first baseman who played for five American League teams, earning Gold Gloves with the California Angels in 1970 and the Chicago White Sox in 1977, while winning a 1978 World Series ring with the New York Yankees.
- February 11 – Frankie Crosetti, 91, All-Star shortstop and longtime coach for the New York Yankees, who spent 37 straight seasons (1932 to 1968) in a Yankee uniform and played or coached on 17 World Series champions; scored 100 runs four times and led American League in stolen bases in 1938.
- February 11 – Les Peden, 78, backup catcher for the 1953 Washington Senators, who later spent ten seasons as a playing manager in the Chicago Cubs and Kansas City Athletics minor league systems.
- February 15 – Mike Darr, 25, outfielder for the San Diego Padres from 1999 until the time of his death, when he was killed in a car accident during spring training in Arizona.
- February 21 – Bill Faul, 61, pitcher who played for the Detroit Tigers, Chicago Cubs and San Francisco Giants in a span of six seasons from 1962 to 1970.
- February 27 – Dykes Potter, 91, pitcher for the 1938 Brooklyn Dodgers.

=== March ===
- March 5 – Clay Smith, 87, pitcher who played with the Cleveland Indians in the 1938 season and for the Detroit Tigers in 1940.
- March 7 – Mickey Haslin, 92, middle infielder for the Philadelphia Phillies, Boston Bees and New York Giants during six seasons from 1933 to 1938.
- March 8 – Ted Sepkowski, 78, infield/outfield utility man who appeared in 19 games for the Cleveland Indians and New York Yankees in part of three seasons from 1942 to 1947.
- March 9 – Jack Baer, 87, coach who led the Oklahoma team to the 1951 College World Series title.
- March 11 – Al Cowens, 50, right fielder for four American League teams (1974 to 1986), who batted .312, won a Gold Glove, and was the AL MVP runner-up for the 1977 Kansas City Royals.
- March 11 – Genevieve George, 74, Canadian catcher who played in the All-American Girls Professional Baseball League.
- March 12 – Steve Gromek, 82, All-Star pitcher who won 19 games for the 1945 Cleveland Indians and hurled a 2–1 victory against the Boston Braves in Game 4 of the 1948 World Series, won by Cleveland in six games.
- March 13 – Lou Kahn, 86, member of St. Louis Cardinals' coaching staff (1954–1955); former minor-league catcher and manager; later, longtime scout for Philadelphia Phillies.
- March 17 – Lefty Bertrand, 93, pitcher who appeared in one game for the 1936 Philadelphia Phillies.
- March 23 – Minnie Rojas, 68, Cuban relief pitcher for the 1966–1968 California Angels who led the American League in saves (27) in 1967.
- March 24 – Mace Brown, 92, All-Star relief pitcher who played for the Pittsburgh Pirates, Brooklyn Dodgers and Boston Red Sox in a span of ten seasons from 1935 to 1946; later a longtime scout and pitching coach in Red Sox' organization.
- March 26 – Whitey Wietelmann, 83, infielder for the Boston Bees/Braves and Pittsburgh Pirates from 1939 through 1947; spent a decade as a coach in Pacific Coast League and 13 years as MLB coach for the 1966–1967 Cincinnati Reds and 1969–1979 San Diego Padres.

=== April ===
- April 1 – Russell Awkard, 84, outfielder in the Negro National League in 1940 and 1941, then served in the United States Army during World War II.
- April 3 – Roy Nichols, 81, infielder for the 1944 New York Giants.
- April 3 – Karl Swanson, 101, second baseman for the Chicago White Sox in the 1928 and 1929 seasons, who at the time of his death was the oldest living major leaguer.
- April 5 – Paul Erickson, 86, pitcher who appeared in 207 games for the Chicago Cubs, Philadelphia Phillies and New York Giants between 1941 and 1948, being a contributor to the Cubs in their run for the 1945 National League championship, going 7–4 with 3.32 ERA in 28 games while compiling three complete games and three saves, then working in four of the seven games of the 1945 World Series, including the decisive Game 7 defeat against the Detroit Tigers.
- April 5 – Sheriff Robinson, 80, minor-league catcher and manager who spent all or parts of five seasons as an MLB coach for the New York Mets between 1964 and 1972; longtime scout.
- April 6 – Tom Sunkel, 89, pitcher who played for the St. Louis Cardinals, New York Giants, and Brooklyn Dodgers in part of six seasons spanning 1937–1944, even though his left eye was damaged when he was a child which caused him to lose all sight in this eye in 1941.
- April 9 – James T. Gallagher, 97, sportswriter turned executive; general manager of Chicago Cubs from 1941 to 1949, and business manager from 1950 through 1956.
- April 21 – Sam Dente, 79, reliable shortstop for the Boston Red Sox, St. Louis Browns, Washington Senators and Chicago White Sox, as well as a member of the 1954 American League champion Cleveland Indians.
- April 23 – Jim "Fireball" Cohen, 83, All-Star pitcher for the 1948 Indianapolis Clowns of the Negro American League.
- April 23 – Pee Wee Jenkins, 79, southpaw who pitched for the Negro leagues' Birmingham Black Barons (1944) and New York Cubans (1946–1948).
- April 26 – John "Red" Davis, 86, third baseman who played in 21 games for the 1941 New York Giants and later managed in the minor leagues for 27 years.
- April 27 – Jerry Witte, 86, first baseman who played for the St. Louis Browns in part of two seasons from 1946 to 1947.

=== May ===
- May 10 – Larry Napoleon, 79, southpaw who pitched for the 1947 Kansas City Monarchs of the Negro American League.
- May 10 – Willie Simms, 93, outfielder for the Chicago American Giants and Kansas City Monarchs between 1937 and 1943.
- May 11 – Steve Rachunok, 85, pitcher for the 1940 Brooklyn Dodgers.
- May 13 – Bill Rodgers, 79, backup outfielder for the Pittsburgh Pirates from 1944 to 1945, who was one of many ballplayers who only appeared in the major leagues during World War II.
- May 17 – Joe Black, 78, Brooklyn Dodgers pitcher who was named National League Rookie of the Year in 1952, while becoming the first black pitcher to win a World Series game, doing it in his rookie season.
- May 17 – Bobby Robinson, 98, slick-fielding third baseman who played in the Negro leagues between 1925 and 1940; known as "The Human Vacuum Cleaner".
- May 21 – Bob Poser, 92, who played with the Chicago White Sox in the 1932 season and for the St. Louis Browns in 1935, whose nine-game major league career emerged from oblivion when Chris Resop appeared in the majors, as Poser and Resop became the third pair of big leaguers with reversed surnames.
- May 22 – Fritz Ackley, 65, pitcher who appeared in five games for the Chicago White Sox in 1963 and 1964.
- May 22 – Joe Cascarella, 94, pitcher for the Philadelphia Athletics, Boston Red Sox, Washington Senators, and Cincinnati Reds in the 1930s, and the last surviving member of the 1934 U.S. All-Star team which toured Japan.
- May 22 – Faye Dancer, 78, All-American Girls Professional Baseball League center fielder, who served as inspiration for the character portrayed by Madonna in the 1992 film A League of Their Own.
- May 22 – Paul Giel, 69, relief pitcher who played from 1954 through 1962 for the New York/San Francisco Giants, Pittsburgh Pirates, Kansas City Athletics and Minnesota Twins.
- May 22 – Warren Hacker, 77, pitcher for the Chicago Cubs, Cincinnati Reds, Philadelphia Phillies and Chicago White Sox for a dozen seasons spanning 1948 to 1961.
- May 24 – Jim "Big Stick" McCurine, 81, outfielder for the 1946–1948 Chicago American Giants of the Negro American League.
- May 25 – Adolph Matulis, 81, Chicago-area multi-sport athlete who starred in baseball, basketball and football at the University of Arizona who later was a pitcher and player-manager in the Cubs' organization.
- May 28 – Wes Westrum, 79, catcher for the New York Giants from 1947 to 1957; member of 1954 World Series champions and two-time NL All-Star; manager of the New York Mets (1965–1967) and San Francisco Giants (1974–1975); longtime coach and scout.
- May 29 – Sam Page, 86, pitcher for the 1939 Philadelphia Athletics.

=== June ===
- June 12 – Hank Boney, 98, relief pitcher for the 1927 New York Giants.
- June 17 – Bill Adair, 89, longtime manager in the minor leagues who briefly served as interim manager of the Chicago White Sox in 1970; coached for White Sox, Milwaukee/Atlanta Braves, and Montreal Expos.
- June 18 – Jack Buck, 77, broadcaster who worked for the St. Louis Cardinals for nearly 50 years, whose play-by-play work earned him recognition from numerous Halls of Fame, such as the National Baseball Hall of Fame, the Pro Football Hall of Fame, and the National Radio Hall of Fame.
- June 18 – Jack Jenkins, 59, pitcher who played with the Washington Senators in the 1962 and 1963 seasons and for the Los Angeles Dodgers in 1969.
- June 20 – Cecil Cole, 82, pitcher for the 1946 Newark Eagles of the Negro National League.
- June 22 – Darryl Kile, 33, three-time All-Star pitcher for the Houston Astros, Colorado Rockies and St. Louis Cardinals from 1991 through 2002, who threw a no-hitter for the Astros in 1993, won 20 games for St. Louis in 2000, and died of coronary disease in Chicago, where he and the Cardinals were staying for a weekend series against the Chicago Cubs.
- June 22 – Ron Kline, 70, pitcher for nine teams, primarily with the Pittsburgh Pirates, who led the American League in saves while pitching for the 1965 Washington Senators.
- June 24 – June Schofield, 76, Canadian infielder who played from 1948 to 1949 in the All-American Girls Professional Baseball League.
- June 25 – Joe Antolick, 86, backup catcher for the 1944 Philadelphia Phillies, who later served as a player/manager in the minor leagues from 1946 to 1951.
- June 27 – Ralph Erickson, 100, relief pitcher for the Pittsburgh Pirates in 1929 and 1930, who upon the April 3 death of Karl Swanson became baseball's oldest living player, dying two days after his 100th birthday.
- June 30 – Pete Gray, 87, outfielder who played in the major leagues for the 1945 St. Louis Browns despite having lost his right arm in a childhood accident.
- June 30 – Raúl Sánchez, 71, Cuban pitcher for the Washington Senators and Cincinnati Redlegs/Reds during three seasons from 1952 to 1960, who also played for the Havana Sugar Kings of the International League.
- June 30 – Wilmore Williams, 84, third baseman for the 1943 Newark Eagles of the Negro National League.

=== July ===
- July 3 – Earl Francis, 66, pitcher for the Pittsburgh Pirates and St. Louis Cardinals during six seasons from 1960 to 1965.
- July 5 – Ted Williams, 83, Hall of Fame and 17-time All-Star left fielder for the Boston Red Sox, widely regarded as the greatest hitter in the sport's history, who won two Triple Crowns, two MVP awards and six batting titles, including a .406 season in 1941, the last .400 mark in the major leagues, while posting a .344 lifetime average (7th highest ever), a .634 slugging average mark (2nd to Babe Ruth), including 521 home runs with four AL titles and a .482 on-base percentage (MLB all-time record); manager of Washington Senators/Texas Rangers franchise (1969–1972).
- July 14 – Alphonso Gerard, 85, outfielder and only native of U.S. Virgin Islands to play in the Negro leagues, primarily as a member of the New York Black Yankees from 1945 to 1947.
- July 17 – Lee Maye, 67, outfielder who played 13 seasons from 1959 through 1971 for the Milwaukee Braves, Houston Astros, Cleveland Indians, Washington Senators and Chicago White Sox; led the major leagues with 44 doubles in 1964.
- July 18 – Del Wilber, 83, catcher for the St. Louis Cardinals, Philadelphia Phillies and Boston Red Sox during eight seasons between 1946 and 1954; a manager, scout and coach after his playing days.
- July 19 – Spec Shea, 81, All-Star pitcher who played for the New York Yankees and Washington Senators in parts of 8 seasons from 1947 to 1955 who also won a World Series championship in his rookie season of 1947.
- July 23 – Ned Martin, 78, play-by-play broadcaster for Boston Red Sox for 32 seasons (1961 through 1992) known for his wit, Shakespearean quotes, and restrained delivery; "Voice of the Red Sox" on radio (1972–1978) and television (1979–1992), and called post-season baseball for CBS Radio during the 1970s.
- July 24 – Pete Coscarart, 87, All-Star second baseman who played for the Brooklyn Dodgers and Pittsburgh Pirates in nine seasons from 1938 to 1946.
- July 24 – Al Silvera, 66, outfielder for the Cincinnati Redlegs during the 1955 and 1956 seasons.
- July 24 – Barney White, 79, infielder for the 1945 Brooklyn Dodgers.
- July 25 – Bob Barr, 94, relief pitcher for the 1935 Brooklyn Dodgers.
- July 25 – Izzy León, 91, Cuban pitcher for the 1945 Philadelphia Phillies, and one of many ballplayers who only appeared in the majors during World War II.
- July 26 – Ed Runge, 87, American League umpire from 1954 to 1970 who worked in three World Series; his son Paul and grandson Brian also became MLB umpires.
- July 28 – Steve Souchock, 83, outfielder and first baseman who played for three teams, most notably the Detroit Tigers in parts of 8 seasons from 1946 to 1955.
- July 28 – Hal Spindel, 89, backup catcher for the St. Louis Browns and Philadelphia Phillies in parts of three seasons between 1939 and 1946.

=== August ===
- August 1 – Jack Tighe, 88, former minor league catcher and longtime employee of Detroit Tigers; coached for Tigers (1942 and 1955–1956) and served as manager from 1957 to June 9, 1958.
- August 4 – Mike Payne, 40, pitcher for the 1984 Atlanta Braves.
- August 5 – Willis Hudlin, 96, pitcher who won 158 games in 16 seasons in the majors with almost all of them coming with the Cleveland Indians from 1926 through 1940.
- August 5 – Darrell Porter, 50, All-Star catcher who overcame drug and alcohol addiction to become the Most Valuable Player of the 1982 World Series with the St. Louis Cardinals.
- August 8 – Willie Young, 90, southpaw pitcher for the 1945 Birmingham Black Barons of the Negro American League; born without a right hand.
- August 12 – Enos Slaughter, 86, Hall of Fame right fielder who spent 13 seasons (1938–1942, 1946–1953) with the St. Louis Cardinals and was a ten-time All-Star, batting .300 lifetime and leading the National League in triples twice and in doubles, hits and RBI once each; best known for his "mad dash" to score from first base on Harry Walker's double to win Game 7 of the 1946 World Series over the Boston Red Sox; won four World Series rings with Cardinals, and — late in his career — New York Yankees.
- August 13 – Jack Creel, 86, pitcher for the 1945 St. Louis Cardinals.
- August 15 – Arnie Moser, 87, pinch hitter for the 1937 Cincinnati Reds.
- August 16 – John Roseboro, 69, six-time All-Star catcher and two-time Gold Glove Award winner, who won three World Series with the Los Angeles Dodgers, being also involved in a major altercation with pitcher Juan Marichal during a game between the Dodgers and San Francisco Giants at Candlestick Park in 1965.
- August 17 – Jimmy Bloodworth, 85, second baseman for the Washington Senators, Detroit Tigers, Pittsburgh Pirates, Cincinnati Reds and Philadelphia Phillies in parts of 11 seasons from 1937 to 1951; backup infielder for 1950 Phils' "Whiz Kids".
- August 18 – Dick O'Connell, 87, executive; general manager of the Boston Red Sox from September 16, 1965, to October 24, 1977; two-time (1967, 1975) The Sporting News Major League Executive of the Year.
- August 23 – Hoyt Wilhelm, 80, Hall of Fame knuckleball pitcher, who in 1985 became the first reliever so honored; set records for career games (1,070) and saves (227) over 21 seasons (1952–1972), winning 143 games, despite ending rookie year at age 30; threw a no-hitter in a rare 1958 start; led National League in earned-run average and games pitched in debut season with 1952 New York Giants, and later led American League in ERA in 1959, while posting a career 2.52 ERA — lowest of any modern pitcher with 2,000 innings.

=== September ===
- September 4 – Jim Constable, 69, pitcher for the New York/San Francisco Giants, Cleveland Indians, Washington Senators and Milwaukee Braves in parts of 5 seasons from 1956 to 1963.
- September 14 – Jim McKee, 55, pitcher for the Pittsburgh Pirates in the 1972 and 1973 seasons.
- September 14 – Eddie Shokes, 82, first baseman for the Cincinnati Reds in parts of two seasons from 1941 to 1946.
- September 22 – Don Carlsen, 75, pitcher for the Chicago Cubs and Pittsburgh Pirates in parts of 3 seasons from 1948 to 1952.
- September 25 – Ray Hayworth, 98, the last surviving teammate of Ty Cobb, who worked in baseball for over a half-century in different roles; spent 15 seasons in the majors as a catcher, almost all of it with the Detroit Tigers, including Detroit's World Series teams in 1934 and 1935, while setting an American League record for most consecutive without committing an error at 439 between 1931 and 1932, later broken by Yogi Berra.
- September 26 – Al Kvasnak, 81, outfielder for the 1942 Washington Senators.
- September 30 – Eddie McGah, 81, catcher for the Boston Red Sox from 1946 to 1947, who later became a minority owner of the AFL-NFL Oakland Raiders from 1959 to 2002.

=== October ===
- October 4 – Edgar Munzel, 95, sportswriter for the Chicago Herald-Examiner and Sun-Times from 1929 to 1973.
- October 8 – Jodie Beeler, 81, infielder for the 1944 Cincinnati Reds.
- October 10 – Joe Wood, 86, son of the legendary Smoky Joe Wood, who pitched briefly for the Boston Red Sox in their 1944 season.
- October 11 – Toots Ferrell, 73, pitcher for the 1947 Newark Eagles and 1948–1949 Baltimore Elite Giants of the Negro National League.
- October 20 – Mel Harder, 93, who spent 36 seasons with the Cleveland Indians, as a pitcher from 1928 to 1947, pitching coach from 1948 to 1963, and interim manager in 1961 (one game) and 1962 (two games), with Cleveland retiring his #18 uniform in 1990; appeared in four All-Star games from 1934 to 1937, throwing a record 13 straight shutout innings; set Cleveland franchise records for wins (223), games started (433) and innings pitched (3,426 1/3) that were later broken by Bob Feller; holds club record of 582 career games pitched; after 1963, a coach for the Mets, Cubs, Reds and Royals.

=== November ===
- November 3 – Warren Peace, 81, pitcher for the 1945–1947 Newark Eagles of the Negro National League.
- November 10 – Ken Raffensberger, 85, All-Star pitcher who played for the St. Louis Cardinals, Chicago Cubs, Philadelphia Phillies, and Cincinnati Reds/Redlegs during 14 seasons spanning 1939–1954, being noted for his pinpoint control, as he hurled four one-hitters and led National League in shutouts twice.
- November 15 – Ed Freed, 83, outfielder who played briefly with the Philadelphia Phillies in the 1942 season.
- November 17 – Ulysses Redd, 88, shortstop for the 1940–1941 Birmingham Black Barons of the Negro American League.

=== December ===
- December 1 – Dave McNally, 60, three-time All-Star pitcher and member of two World Series championship teams with the Baltimore Orioles, who had four consecutive 20-win seasons from 1968 to 1971, pitched a 1–0 shutout in Game 4 of the 1966 World Series to swept the defending champion Los Angeles Dodgers, and batted a grand slam in Game 3 of the 1970 World Series, to become the only pitcher to hit a slam in Series history; also known, along with Andy Messersmith, for challenging the reserve clause in standard player contracts, which resulted in a December 1975 arbitrator's decision permitting free agency in professional baseball.
- December 2 – Frank Bradley, 84, pitcher for the Kansas City Monarchs of the Negro American League from 1937 through 1942.
- December 2 – Ben Wade, 80, pitcher who played for the Chicago Cubs, Brooklyn Dodgers, St. Louis Cardinals and Pittsburgh Pirates in a span of five seasons between 1948 and 1955, as well as a distinguished scout and then director of scouting for the Los Angeles Dodgers, supplying the club with players that would lead it to eight National League championships and four World Series titles during the 1960s, 1970s and 1980s.
- December 3 – Jug Thesenga, 88, pitcher who appeared in five games for the Washington Senators in the 1944 season.
- December 6 – Clarence Beers, 83, relief pitcher who appeared in one game (and two-thirds of an inning) for the 1948 St. Louis Cardinals.
- December 9 – Johnny Lazor, 90, outfielder who provided four years of good services for the Boston Red Sox while left fielder Ted Williams and center fielder Dom DiMaggio were in the military service from 1943 to 1946.
- December 10 – Earl Henry, 85, pitcher who played from 1944 to 1945 for the Cleveland Indians.
- December 10 – Mike Kosman, 85, minor-league second baseman who appeared in one game as a pinch runner for the 1944 Cincinnati Reds.
- December 10 – Homer Spragins, 82, relief pitcher who played for the Philadelphia Phillies in the 1947 season.
- December 11 – Bob Loane, 88, center fielder who played with the Washington Senators in the 1939 season and for the Boston Bees in 1940.
- December 14 – Hank Arft, 80, first baseman who played from 1948 through 1952 for the St. Louis Browns.
- December 15 – Dick Stuart, 70, two-time All-Star first baseman who played for six different clubs from 1958 to 1969, notably the Pittsburgh Pirates and Boston Red Sox; member of the 1960 world champion Pirates; poor fielder (known as "Dr. Strangeglove") who hit at least 30 homers with 100 or more RBIs in each league while ranking among the top-ten home run hitters in five seasons.
- December 19 – Claude Crocker, 78, pitcher for the 1944 Brooklyn Dodgers, and one of several players who only appeared in the major leagues during World War II.
- December 19 – Bob Rinker, 81, catcher for the 1950 Philadelphia Athletics.
- December 23 – George Bullard, 74, shortstop for the 1954 Detroit Tigers.
- December 26 – Frank Reiber, 93, backup catcher who appeared in 44 games for the Detroit Tigers in three seasons spanning 1933–1936, including the team that won the 1935 World Series.
