= Deaths in May 2002 =

The following is a list of notable deaths in May 2002.

Entries for each day are listed alphabetically by surname. A typical entry lists information in the following sequence:

- Name, age, country of citizenship at birth, subsequent country of citizenship (if applicable), reason for notability, cause of death (if known), and reference.

== May 2002 ==
=== 1 ===
- Ade Bethune, 88, American Catholic liturgical artist.
- Aspy Engineer, 89, Indian Air Force officer.
- John Nathan-Turner, 54, British television producer (Doctor Who), infection.
- Hal Prescott, 81, American football player (Green Bay Packers, Philadelphia Eagles, Detroit Lions).
- Tom Sutton, 65, American comic book artist (Vampirella, Doctor Strange, Ghost Rider), heart attack.
- Roger Teillet, 89, Canadian politician.
- Raymond Thomas, 71, French Olympic shot putter (1956).
- Charles Tremblay, 71, American Olympic skier (1956).

=== 2 ===
- Rosa García Ascot, 100, Spanish composer and pianist.
- Peter Thomas Bauer, 86, Hungarian-British economist.
- Lucien Bochard, 76, French Olympic footballer (1952).
- Olive Cook, 90, British writer and artist, cancer.
- Constanța Crăciun, 88, Romanian politician and educator.
- Devika, 59, Indian actress, heart attack.
- Carl Heger, 92, Danish actor.
- Sihung Lung, 72, Taiwanese movie and TV actor, liver failure.
- Viktor Lyoskin, 48, Soviet Russian Olympic speed skater (1980).
- Izet Sarajlić, 72, Bosnian historian of philosophy, essayist, and poet.
- Willi Schreyer, 87, Austrian Olympic gymnast (1948).
- Ron Soble, 70, American actor in films and television.
- Richard Stücklen, 85, German politician, President of the Bundestag.
- Judy Toll, 44, American actress, writer and comedian, melanoma.
- W. T. Tutte, 84, British-Canadian cryptographer during World War II and mathematician.

=== 3 ===
- Livingston L. Biddle, Jr., 83, American author and promoter of funding for the arts.
- Malcolm Bosse, 75, American author, known for his historical novels set in Asia.
- Barbara Castle, 91, British Labour politician and female life peer.
- Muhammad Haji Ibrahim Egal, 73, president of Somaliland and former prime minister of the Somali Republic.
- Mohan Singh Oberoi, 103, Indian hotelier and retailer.
- Yevgeny Svetlanov, 73, Russian conductor, composer and pianist.
- Mariana Yampolsky, 76, Mexican photographer.

=== 4 ===
- Ishaya Mark Aku, Nigerian politician, Minister of Sports (since 2001), plane crash.
- Don Allard, 66, American football player (New York Titans, Boston Patriots) and coach.
- Clarence Boston, 85, American college football coach, head coach of New Hampshire Wildcats from 1949 to 1964.
- Ernesto Díaz, 49, Colombian football player and Olympian (1972).
- Eugene Andrew Gordon, 84, American district judge (United States District Court for the Middle District of North Carolina).
- John Hasted, 81, British physicist and folk musician.
- John Kohn, 76, American writer and producer, cancer.
- Rolf Friedemann Pauls, 86, German diplomat.
- Elizabeth Russell, 85, American actress.
- Gerónimo Saccardi, 52, Argentine football player and manager, heart attack.
- Abu Turab al-Zahiri, 79, Saudi Arabian writer of Arab Indian descent.

=== 5 ===
- Randy Anderson, 42, American wrestling referee, testicular cancer.
- Hugo Banzer, 75, Bolivian politician, Bolivian dictator (1971 to 1978), President of Bolivia (1997 to 2001), lung cancer.
- Howard C. Bratton, 80, American district judge (United States District Court for the District of New Mexico).
- Dick Farman, 85, American professional football player (Washington State, Washington Redskins).
- Andrei Rostotsky, 45, Soviet and Russian actor, film director, screenwriter, and TV host, fall.
- Hank Rushmere, 89, British rower and Olympian (1948).
- Clarence Seignoret, 83, president of Dominica (1983–1993).
- George Sidney, 85, American film director (Bye Bye Birdie, Viva Las Vegas, Anchors Aweigh), lymphoma.
- Jimmy Smith, 67, American basketball player.
- Odell Stautzenberger, 77, American football player (Buffalo Bills).
- Mike Todd, Jr., 72, American film producer, introduced short-lived movie format Smell-O-Vision (Scent of Mystery), lung cancer.
- Čestmír Vycpálek, 80, Czech football player and manager.
- Louis C. Wyman, 85, American politician (U.S. Representative for New Hampshire's 1st congressional district), cancer.

=== 6 ===
- Murray Adaskin, 96, Canadian violinist, composer, conductor and teacher.
- Heinz Arndt, 87, German-Australian economist, traffic collision.
- Otis Blackwell, 71, American songwriter, singer and pianist ("Great Balls of Fire", "Don't Be Cruel", "All Shook Up", "Return to Sender").
- James Lawton Collins Jr., 84, U.S. Army brigadier general and military historian.
- Harry George Drickamer, 83, American chemical engineer, a pioneer in high-pressure studies of condensed matter.
- Pim Fortuyn, 54, Dutch politician, assassinated.
- Shanta Gandhi, 84, Indian theatre director, dancer and playwright.
- Bjørn Johansen, 61, Norwegian jazz musician.
- Bronisław Pawlik, 76, Polish actor, stomach cancer.
- Saleh Selim, 71, Egyptian football player, actor, and Olympian (1960), liver cancer.

=== 7 ===
- Kevyn Aucoin, 40, American make-up artist and author (The Art of Makeup, Making Faces, Face Forward), multiple organ dysfunction syndrome.
- Durga Bhagwat, 92, Indian scholar, socialist and writer.
- Bernard Burrows, 91, British diplomat.
- Ewart Jones, 91, Welsh chemist.
- Robert Kanigher, 86, American comic book writer and editor (Wonder Woman, The Flash, Sgt. Rock).
- Dick Meissner, 62, Canadian ice hockey player (Boston Bruins, New York Rangers).
- Masakatsu Miyamoto, 63, Japanese football player, manager, and Olympian (1964, 1968), pneumonia.
- Xavier Montsalvatge, 90, Spanish composer and music critic.
- Seattle Slew, 28, American thoroughbred racehorse champion.
- Monica Sinclair, 77, British operatic contralto.

=== 8 ===
- Sylvester Barrett, 75, Irish politician (Minister for the Environment, Minister for Defence, Member of the European Parliament).
- Alexander Bottini, 33, Venezuelan footballer.
- Basil Chubb, 80, English-Irish political scientist and author (The Government and Politics of Ireland).
- Edward Jackson, 76, English diplomat (Ambassador to Cuba, Ambassador to Belgium).
- Tilly Lauenstein, 85, German film and television actress.
- Lou Lombardo, 70, American film editor (The Wild Bunch, McCabe & Mrs. Miller, Moonstruck), stroke.
- Ahmad Mazhar, 84, Egyptian actor, pneumonia.
- Boyce McDaniel, 84, American nuclear physicist, worked on the Manhattan Project, heart attack.
- Thore Skredegaard, 92, Norwegian Olympic sports shooter (1948).

=== 9 ===
- Dan Devine, 77, American football player and coach (Arizona State, Missouri, Green Bay Packers, Notre Dame).
- Bill Garnaas, 80, American football player (Pittsburgh Steelers).
- Robert Layton, 76, Canadian politician and a member of Parliament (House of Commons representing Lachine and Lachine—Lac-Saint-Louis, Quebec).
- Leon Stein, 91, American composer and music analyst.
- Sam Walton, 59, American gridiron football player (East Texas State, New York Jets, Houston Oilers), heart attack.

=== 10 ===
- Philip Edward Archer, 77, Ghanaian lawyer and Chief Justice (1991-1995).
- Kaifi Azmi, 83, Indian Urdu poet.
- Lynda Lyon Block, 54, American convicted murderer, executed by electric chair.
- George Cates, 90, American music arranger, conductor, songwriter and record producer.
- John Cunniff, 57, American hockey player and coach (Hartford Whalers, Boston Bruins, New Jersey Devils), esophageal cancer.
- Austen Kark, 75, British television executive, managing director of the BBC World Service.
- Larry Napoleon, 79, American baseball player.
- David Riesman, 92, American sociologist, educator, and commentator on American society.
- Yves Robert, 81, French actor, screenwriter, director, and producer, cerebral hemorrhage.
- Bill Simms, 93, American baseball player.

=== 11 ===
- Joseph Bonanno, 97, Italian-American mafia boss, heart attack.
- Renaude Lapointe, 90, Canadian journalist and a politician.
- Bill Peet, 87, American animator and screenwriter (Cinderella, Peter Pan, Alice in Wonderland).
- Steve Rachunok, 85, American baseball player (Brooklyn Dodgers).
- Abida Sultan, 88, Pakistani princess and daughter of Nawab Hamidullah Khan.
- Jerzy Tabeau, 83, Polish Holocaust survivor.
- Nika Turbina, 27, Soviet and Russian poet, suicide by jumping.

=== 12 ===
- Edward M. Carey, 85, American oil industry executive.
- Richard Chorley, 74, English geographer, heart attack.
- Luciano Galesi, 75, Italian Olympic sports shooter (1952).
- Bruce Hansen, 74, New Zealand Olympic equestrian (1964).

=== 13 ===
- Clinton Adams, 83, American artist, art historian and head of the Tamarind Institute, liver cancer.
- Alan P. Bell, 70, American psychologist (Kinsey Institute).
- Ruth Cracknell, 76, Australian actress (Mother and Son), pneumonia.
- George Gordienko, 74, Canadian professional wrestler and artist, melanoma.
- Valeriy Lobanovskyi, 63, Ukrainian football coach, stroke.
- Douglas Pike, 77, American historian and scholar on the Vietnam War.
- Bill Rodgers, 79, American baseball player (Pittsburgh Pirates).
- Morihiro Saito, 74, Japanese aikido teacher, cancer.
- Pyotr Tolstikhin, 75, Soviet Russian Olympic sailor (1956).

=== 14 ===
- Derek Birley, 75, British educationist, writer and sports historian.
- Rawshan Jamil, 71, Bangladeshi actress and dancer.
- José Lutzenberger, 75, Brazilian agronomist and environmentalist, heart attack.
- Gordon J. F. MacDonald, 72, American geophysicist.
- Dale Morey, 83, American basketball player.
- Ray Stricklyn, 73, American actor and publicist, emphysema.

=== 15 ===
- Kofoworola Ademola, 88, Nigerian educationist.
- Bernard Benjamin, 92, British statistician, a leading figure in the field of demography.
- Darwood Kaye, 72, American child actor (Our Gang), hit and run accident.
- Tatiana Okunevskaya, 88, Soviet and Russian actress.
- Arthur Peddy, 85, American comic book artist.
- Bryan Pringle, 67, British actor.

=== 16 ===
- José Aceituno, 65, Chilean long distance runner and Olympian (1960).
- Shoichi Arai, 36, Japanese professional wrestling promoter, suicide by hanging.
- Eduard de Atzel, 85, Peruvian Olympic sports shooter (1960, 1964).
- Alec Campbell, 103, Australian World War I veteran, nation's last surviving ANZAC at the Gallipoli campaign.
- Jim Dewar, 59, Scottish musician, stroke.
- Big Dick Dudley, 34, American professional wrestler (ECW), kidney failure.
- Kenneth Fung, 90, Hong Kong politician and businessman.
- Ferenc Kemény, 79, Hungarian Olympic gymnast (1952).
- Salcia Landmann, 90, Jewish Ukrainian writer.
- José Reis, 94, Brazilian scientist, journalist, and science writer.
- José Riesgo, 82, Spanish actor.
- Gavril Serfőző, 75, Romanian football player and Olympian (1952).

=== 17 ===
- Dave Berg, 81, American cartoonist (Mad, The Lighter Side of...), cancer.
- Joe Black, 78, American first Black baseball pitcher to win a World Series game (Brooklyn Dodgers, Cincinnati Redlegs, Washington Senators), prostate cancer.
- Edwin Alonzo Boyd, 88, Canadian bank robber and prison escapee of the 1950s (Citizen Gangster).
- James Chichester-Clark, 79, Northern Ireland politician, Prime Minister of Northern Ireland from 1969 to 1971.
- John de Lancie, 80, American oboist, principal oboist of the Philadelphia Orchestra and director of the Curtis Institute of Music.
- László Kubala, 74, Hungarian and Slovak football player.
- Bobby Robinson, 98, American baseball player.
- Sharon Sheeley, 62, American songwriter.
- Little Johnny Taylor, 59, American singer.
- Aşık Mahzuni Şerif, 61, Turkish folk musician, composer, poet, and author, heart failure.
- Norman Vaughan, 79, English comedian.

=== 18 ===
- Sergio Andreoli, 80, Italian football player.
- Song Hye-rim, 65, North Korean actress, best, breast cancer.
- Egidio Premiani, 93, Italian Olympic basketball player (1936).
- Wolfgang Schneiderhan, 86, Austrian classical violinist.
- Davey Boy Smith, 39, British professional wrestler, myocardial infarction, heart attack.
- Zypora Spaisman, 86, Polish-American actress and Yiddish theatre empresaria.
- Gordon Wharmby, 68, British actor (Last of the Summer Wine), cancer.

=== 19 ===
- René de Chambrun, 95, French-American aristocrat, lawyer, businessman and author.
- Raymond Durgnat, 69, British film critic (Films and Filming, Film Comment, Monthly Film Bulletin) and author.
- Herbert Familton, 74, New Zealand Olympic alpine skier (1952).
- Sir John Gorton, 90, 19th Prime Minister of Australia.
- Earl Hammond, 80, American voice actor (Thundercats).
- Walter Lord, 84, American historian, Parkinson's disease.
- Otar Lordkipanidze, 72, Georgian archaeologist, heart attack.
- Giuseppe Maria Scotese, 86, Italian screenwriter and film director.
- Bryant Tuckerman, 86, American mathematician.

=== 20 ===
- David Abrahamsen, 98, Norwegian forensic psychiatrist, psychoanalyst and author.
- Renzo Barbera, 82, Italian businessman and soccer executive.
- Jerry Dunphy, 80, American Los Angeles television news anchor, heart attack.
- Stephen Jay Gould, 60, American paleontologist, evolutionary biologist and popular science author, cancer.
- Jack Helms, 80, American football player (Detroit Lions).
- Sándor Kónya, 78, Hungarian tenor.
- Eduardo de Medeiros, 79, Brazilian Olympic modern pentathlete (1952).
- Eberle Hynson Schultz, 84, American football player.

=== 21 ===
- Rogers Albritton, 78, American philosopher, pulmonary emphysema.
- Joe Cobb, 86, American child actor, appeared as the original "fat boy" in the Our Gang comedies.
- Michel Grosclaude, 75, French linguist, and author of works on grammar and lexicography.
- Andrzej Herder, 64, Polish film and theatre actor.
- Roy Paul, 82, Welsh footballer.
- Niki de Saint Phalle, 71, French artist, pulmonary emphysema.
- Bob Poser, 92, American baseball player (Chicago White Sox, St. Louis Browns).
- Teddy Saunders, 90, Canadian ice hockey player (Ottawa Senators).

=== 22 ===
- Fritz Ackley, 65, American baseball player (Chicago White Sox).
- Sultan Ahmed, 64, Indian film director and producer.
- Joe Cascarella, 94, American baseball player (Philadelphia Athletics, Boston Red Sox, Washington Senators, Cincinnati Reds).
- Faye Dancer, 77, American baseball player.
- Paul Giel, 69, American baseball player (New York/San Francisco Giants, Pittsburgh Pirates, Minnesota Twins).
- Warren Hacker, 77, American baseball player (Chicago Cubs, Cincinnati Redlegs, Philadelphia Phillies, Chicago White Sox).
- Dick Hern, 81, British racehorse trainer.
- Fritz Hippler, 92, German filmmaker.
- Creighton Miller, 79, American football player and attorney, heart attack.
- Alexandru Todea, 89, Romanian Greek-Catholic cardinal.
- Patrick Wolrige-Gordon, 66, British (Scottish) politician (Member of Parliament for East Aberdeenshire).

=== 23 ===
- Umberto Bindi, 70, Italian singer-songwriter, heart disease.
- Wally Fromhart, 89, American football player and coach.
- Nick Kerasiotis, 83, American football player (Chicago Bears).
- Bill Neidjie, 80s, Aboriginal Australian Gaagudju elder, last speaker of the Gaagudju language.
- Timur Novikov, 43, Russian visual artist, designer, art theorist, philosopher, and musician, pneumonia.
- Sam Snead, 89, American golfer, complications from a stroke.
- Dorothy Spencer, 93, American film editor (Stagecoach, Cleopatra, Earthquake).
- Herbert Ulrich, 80, Austrian Olympic ice hockey player (1948).

=== 24 ===
- Joseph Bau, 81, Polish-Israeli artist, philosopher, animator, comedian, and poet, pneumonia.
- Susie Garrett, 72, American actress (Punky Brewster) and jazz vocalist, cancer.
- Jim McCurine, 81, American baseball player.
- Antonia Pantoja, 79, Puerto Rican educator, feminist, and civil rights leader, cancer.
- Vladimír Skovajsa, 73, Slovak Olympic swimmer (1952).
- Itō Toshihito, 40, Japanese actor, subarachnoid hemorrhage.
- Xi Zhongxun, 88, Chinese communist revolutionary.

=== 25 ===
- Josephine Abady, 52, American film and stage director, producer.
- Pat Coombs, 75, English actress (Till Death Us Do Part, EastEnders, Ooh... You Are Awful), pulmonary emphysema.
- Bart de Graaff, 35, Dutch television presenter/producer and founder of broadcasting network BNN, kidney failure.
- Ștefan Augustin Doinaș, 80, Romanian neoclassical poet, heart failure.
- Zoran Janković, 62, Yugoslavian Olympic water polo player (1964, 1968, 1972), liver cancer.
- You Jih-cheng, 53, Taiwanese politician, member of the Legislative Yuan (1993-1996), plane crash.
- Michel Jobert, 80, French politician, cerebral hemorrhage.
- Pål-Nils Nilsson, 72, Swedish photographer and filmmaker.
- Nathan Mantel, 83, American biostatistician, heart attack.
- Henry Anthony Politz, 70, American circuit judge (United States Court of Appeals for the Fifth Circuit).
- Jack Pollard, 75, Australian sports journalist, stroke.

=== 26 ===
- Jon Bannenberg, English-Australian yacht designer, brain cancer.
- William Austin Ingram, 77, American district judge (United States District Court for the Northern District of California).
- Flora Lewis, 84, American journalist (The Washington Post, The New York Times), cancer.
- Ivo Maček, 88, Croatian pianist, composer and academian.
- John Alexander Moore, 86, American biologist.
- Vicente Nebrada, 72, Venezuelan dancer and choreographer, cancer.
- Jean-Jacques Petter, 74, French primatologist.
- Giuseppe Pintarelli, 71, Italian racing cyclist.
- Mohinder Singh, 68, Indian Olympic triple jumper (1956).
- Mamo Wolde, 69, Ethiopian Olympic long-distance runner (1956, 1964, 1968, 1972), liver cancer.

=== 27 ===
- Marjorie Ogilvie Anderson, 93, Scottish historian and paleographer.
- Barbara Hamilton, 14th Baroness Dudley, 95, British noblewoman, member of the House of Lords.
- Urho Julin, 73, Finnish Olympic middle-distance runner (1952).
- Shabtai Konorti, 58, Israeli actor (Schindler's List), traffic collision.
- Ray Mathew, 73, Australian author.
- Dave Mayor, 85, American Olympic weightlifter (1936).
- Roberts Ozols, 96, Latvian Olympic cyclist (1928).
- Vitaly Solomin, 60, Soviet and Russian actor, director and screenwriter, stroke.

=== 28 ===
- Ibrahim al-Urayyid, 94, Bahraini writer and poet.
- Knut Andersen, 71, Norwegian footballer.
- Napoleon Beazley, 25, American juvenile offender, executed by lethal injection.
- Mildred Benson, 96, American journalist and author of children's books (Nancy Drew Mystery Stories), lung cancer.
- Jean Berger, 92, German-American composer and conductor.
- Ruby Bradley, 94, US Army colonel and one of the most decorated women in its military history.
- Claude Heim, 89, French Olympic long jumper (1936).
- Norman King, 87, New Zealand politician and cabinet minister.
- David Parker Ray, 62, American serial killer, heart attack.
- Wes Westrum, 79, American baseball player (New York Giants) and manager (New York Mets, San Francisco Giants), cancer.
- Rostislav Yurenev, 90, Soviet and Russian film critic and teacher.

=== 29 ===
- Stan Bentham, 87, English footballer, Alzheimer's disease.
- Gunnar Jarring, 94, Swedish diplomat and Turkologist.
- Sándor Mátrai, 69, Hungarian football player.
- Robert Dale Morgan, 90, American district judge.
- Sam Page, 86, American baseball player (Philadelphia Athletics).
- Sher Ali Khan Pataudi, 89, Pakistani politician and diplomat.
- Elémire Zolla, 75, Italian essayist, philosopher and historian.

=== 30 ===
- Kees Boertien, 74, Dutch politician (Christian Democratic Appeal) and jurist.
- Kenny Craddock, 52, British instrumentalist (Ringo Starr, Ginger Baker, Gerry Rafferty), composer and producer, car crash.
- John B. Keane, 73, Irish playwright, novelist and essayist, prostate cancer.
- Mario Lago, 90, Brazilian lawyer, poet, composer and actor, pneumonia.
- Walter Laird, 81, British ballroom dancer.

=== 31 ===
- Jeremy Bray, 71, British politician (member of Parliament representing Middlesbrough West, Motherwell and Wishaw and Motherwell South).
- Subhash Gupte, 72, Indian cricket player.
- Takhir Sabirov, 72, Soviet and Tajik film actor, director and screenwriter.
- Eleanor D. Wilson, 93, American actress (Weekend, Alice's Restaurant, Reds) and artist.
