= 2002 in film =

2002 in film is an overview of events, including the highest-grossing films, award ceremonies, festivals, a list of country- and genre- specific lists of films released, notable deaths and film debuts. Paramount Pictures and Universal Pictures celebrated their 90th anniversaries in 2002.

== Highest-grossing films ==
The top 10 films released in 2002 by worldwide gross are as follows:

Highest-grossing films of 2002
Rank	Title	Distributor	Worldwide gross
1	The Lord of the Rings: The Two Towers	New Line	$936,689,735
2	Harry Potter and the Chamber of Secrets	Warner Bros.	$878,979,634
3	Spider-Man	Sony	$821,708,551
4	Star Wars: Episode II – Attack of the Clones	20th Century Fox	$653,741,940
5	Men in Black II	Sony	$441,818,803
6	Die Another Day	MGM / 20th Century Fox	$431,971,116
7	Signs	Buena Vista	$408,247,917
8	Ice Age	20th Century Fox	$383,257,136
9	My Big Fat Greek Wedding	IFC	$368,744,044
10	Minority Report	20th Century Fox / DreamWorks	$358,372,926

2002 was the first year to see three films cross the eight-hundred-million-dollar milestone, surpassing the previous year's record of two eight-hundred-million-dollar films. It also surpasses the previous year's record of having the most ticket sales in a single year (fueled by the success of various sequels and the first Spider-Man movie).

== Events ==
- March 1 — Paramount Pictures reveals a new-on screen logo that was used until December 2011 to celebrate its 90th anniversary.
- March 15 - Blue Sky Studios releases their first feature film, Ice Age, starring the voices of Ray Romano, John Leguizamo, and Denis Leary. The film was a massive box office success, thus launching one of the highest-grossing franchises in film history.
- May – The Pianist directed by Roman Polanski wins the "Palme d'Or" at the Cannes Film Festival.
- May 3–5 – Spider-Man becomes the first film to earn $100 million in one weekend. This surpassed the previous all-time opening weekend record held by Harry Potter and the Sorcerer's Stone, as well as the previous May opening weekend record held by The Lost World: Jurassic Park. The film went on to earn over $800 million worldwide, surpassing Batman to become the highest-grossing superhero film of all time and Men in Black to become Sony's most successful film.
- May 16 – Star Wars: Episode II – Attack of the Clones opens in theaters. Although a huge success, it was the first Star Wars film not to be the highest-grossing of the year.
- Amélie directed by Jean-Pierre Jeunet wins the 2002 César Award for Best Film, Best Director, Best Music, and Best Art Direction. Amélie also became the highest-grossing French-language film in the United States ever.
- Another French-language film Brotherhood of the Wolf also became the second-highest-grossing French-language film in the United States in the last two decades.

== Awards ==
Category/Organization	8th Critics' Choice Awards January 17, 2003	60th Golden Globe Awards January 19, 2003		56th BAFTA Awards February 23, 2003	Producers, Directors, Screen Actors, and Writers Guild Awards	75th Academy Awards March 23, 2003
Category/Organization	8th Critics' Choice Awards January 17, 2003	Drama	Musical or Comedy	56th BAFTA Awards February 23, 2003	Producers, Directors, Screen Actors, and Writers Guild Awards	75th Academy Awards March 23, 2003
Best Film	Chicago	The Hours	Chicago	The Pianist	Chicago	
Best Director	Steven Spielberg; Catch Me If You Can and Minority Report	Martin Scorsese; Gangs of New York		Roman Polanski; The Pianist	Rob Marshall; Chicago	Roman Polanski; The Pianist
Best Actor	Jack Nicholson; About Schmidt; Daniel Day-Lewis; Gangs of New York	Jack Nicholson; About Schmidt	Richard Gere; Chicago	Daniel Day-Lewis; Gangs of New York		Adrien Brody; The Pianist
Best Actress	Julianne Moore; Far from Heaven	Nicole Kidman; The Hours	Renée Zellweger; Chicago	Nicole Kidman; The Hours	Renée Zellweger; Chicago	Nicole Kidman; The Hours
Best Supporting Actor	Chris Cooper; Adaptation.			Christopher Walken; Catch Me If You Can		Chris Cooper; Adaptation.
Best Supporting Actress	Catherine Zeta-Jones; Chicago	Meryl Streep; Adaptation.		Catherine Zeta-Jones; Chicago		
Best Screenplay, Adapted	Adaptation. and Confessions of a Dangerous Mind; Charlie Kaufman	About Schmidt; Alexander Payne and Jim Taylor		Adaptation. Charlie and Donald Kaufman	The Hours; David Hare	The Pianist; Ronald Harwood
Best Screenplay, Original	Adaptation. and Confessions of a Dangerous Mind; Charlie Kaufman	About Schmidt; Alexander Payne and Jim Taylor		Talk to Her; Pedro Almodóvar	Bowling for Columbine; Michael Moore	Talk to Her; Pedro Almodóvar
Best Animated Film	Spirited Away	—N/a	—N/a	—N/a	—N/a	Spirited Away
Best Original Song	Lose Yourself; 8 Mile	The Hands That Built America; Gangs of New York		—N/a	—N/a	Lose Yourself; 8 Mile
Best Original Score	Catch Me If You Can; John Williams	Frida; Elliot Goldenthal		The Hours; Philip Glass	—N/a	Frida; Elliot Goldenthal
Best Foreign Language Film	Y Tu Mamá También	Talk to Her			—N/a	Nowhere in Africa

Palme d'Or (55th Cannes Film Festival):

The Pianist, directed by Roman Polanski, Poland

Golden Lion (59th Venice International Film Festival):

The Magdalene Sisters, directed by Peter Mullan, U.K. / Ireland

Golden Bear (52nd Berlin International Film Festival):

Spirited Away (Sen to Chihiro no kamikakushi), directed by Hayao Miyazaki, Japan
Bloody Sunday, directed by Paul Greengrass, U.K. / Ireland

== 2002 films ==
=== By country/region ===
- List of American films of 2002
- List of Argentine films of 2002
- List of Australian films of 2002
- List of Bangladeshi films of 2002
- List of British films of 2002
- List of Canadian films of 2002
- List of Chinese films of 2002
- List of French films of 2002
- List of Hong Kong films of 2002
- List of Indian films of 2002
  - List of Bengali films of 2002
  - List of Hindi films of 2002
  - List of Kannada films of 2002
  - List of Malayalam films of 2002
  - List of Marathi films of 2002
  - List of Punjabi films of 2002
  - List of Tamil films of 2002
  - List of Telugu films of 2002
- List of Japanese films of 2002
- List of Mexican films of 2002
- List of Nepalese films of 2002
- List of Pakistani films of 2002
- List of Russian films of 2002
- List of South Korean films of 2002
- List of Spanish films of 2002

=== By genre/medium ===
- List of action films of 2002
- List of animated feature films of 2002
- List of avant-garde films of 2002
- List of crime films of 2002
- List of comedy films of 2002
- List of drama films of 2002
- List of horror films of 2002
- List of science fiction films of 2002
- List of thriller films of 2002
- List of western films of 2002

== Births ==
- January 4 – Tunisha Sharma, Indian actress (died 2022)
- January 15 - Levon Hawke, American actor
- January 18 – Samuel Joslin, British actor
- January 20 – Michael Barbieri, American actor
- January 30 - Joshua Colley, American actor
- February 2 – Madina Nalwanga, Ugandan actress
- February 13 – Sophia Lillis, American actress
- February 18 – Mark Eydelshteyn, Russian actor
- February 23 – Emilia Jones, English actress, singer and songwriter
- March 4 – Jacob Hopkins, American actor
- March 10 – Júlia Gomes, Brazilian actress
- March 15 – Sam McCarthy, American actor
- March 27 – Ty Tennant, English actor
- April 2 – Emma Myers, American actress
- April 4 – Damian Hurley, English actor and model
- April 8 – Skai Jackson, American actress
- April 12 - Filip Geljo, Canadian actor
- April 15 – Clara Galle, Spanish actress
- April 16 – Sadie Sink, American actress
- May 6 – Emily Alyn Lind, American actress
- May 7
  - Andrew Barth Feldman, American actor
  - Jake Bongiovi, American actor
- May 16 – Isaac Kragten, Canadian actor
- May 22 – Maisa Silva, Brazilian actress and television host
- May 26 – Georgie Farmer, English actor
- June 2 – Madison Hu, American actress
- June 3 – Eva Bella, American actress
- June 4 - Taylor Ann Thompson, American actress
- June 5 – Lewis MacDougall, Scottish actor
- July 18 – Tyler Lawrence Gray, American actor
- July 2 – Abraham Attah, Ghanaian actor
- July 16 – Milly Shapiro, American actress and singer
- July 24 – Benjamin Flores Jr., American actor and rapper
- July 25 – Shunsuke Michieda, Japanese actor and singer
- August 1 – Oona Laurence, American actress
- August 12 – Iman Vellani, Pakistani-Canadian actress
- August 16 – Talia Ryder, American actress
- August 19 – Francesco Gheghi, Italian actor
- August 23 – Indiana Massara, Australian actress and singer
- September 6 – Asher Angel, American actor
- September 8 – Gaten Matarazzo, American actor
- September 13 – Chiara Aurelia, American actress
- September 20 - Gabriel LaBelle, Canadian actor
- September 27 – Jenna Ortega, American actress
- September 28 – Kyline Alcantara, Filipino actress, singer and television host
- September 30
  - Levi Miller, Australian actor
  - Maddie Ziegler, American actress
- October 9 – Choi Min-young, South Korean actor
- October 12 – Iris Apatow, American actress
- October 16 - Madison Wolfe, American actress
- October 25 - Dominic Sessa, American actor
- October 26
  - Julian Dennison, New Zealand actor
  - Emma Schweiger, American actress
- October 28 – Lola Tung, American actress
- December 13 – AC Bonifacio, Canadian actress, dancer, singer, vlogger
- December 17 – Guilherme Seta, Brazilian actor
- December 23 – Finn Wolfhard, Canadian actor

== Deaths ==
Month	Date	Name	Age	Country	Profession	Notable films
January	1	Carol Ohmart	74	US	Actress	The Scarlet Hour; House on Haunted Hill
January	1	Julia Phillips	57	US	Producer	Taxi Driver; The Sting
January	1	Meg Wyllie	84	US	Actress	Marnie; The Last Starfighter
January	2	Bibi Osterwald	81	US	Actress	The World of Henry Orient; As Good as It Gets
January	6	Mario Nascimbene	88	Italy	Composer	The Vikings; Room at the Top
January	7	Avery Schreiber	66	US	Actor	Robin Hood: Men in Tights; Caveman
January	9	Bill McCutcheon	77	US	Actor	Steel Magnolias; Family Business
January	11	Henri Verneuil	81	Turkey	Director, Screenwriter	I as in Icarus; The Sheep Has Five Legs
January	12	Stanley Unwin	90	UK	Actor	Chitty Chitty Bang Bang; Carry On Regardless
January	13	Ted Demme	38	US	Director, Producer	Blow; Rounders
January	15	Jeremy Hawk	83	UK	Actor	Elizabeth; Stealing Heaven
January	16	Ron Taylor	49	US	Actor	Trading Places; The Mighty Quinn
January	17	Queenie Leonard	96	UK	Actress	And Then There Were None; Alice in Wonderland
January	19	Roy Conrad	61	US	Actor	Patch Adams; Casino
January	20	Carrie Hamilton	38	US	Actress	Tokyo Pop; Cool World
January	20	Harold Kasket	75	UK	Actor	The Man Who Knew Too Much; The 7th Voyage of Sinbad
January	21	Peggy Lee	81	US	Singer, Actress	Lady and the Tramp; Pete Kelly's Blues
January	23	Howard A. Smith	89	US	Film Editor	Breakfast at Tiffany's; The Delicate Delinquent
January	29	Stratford Johns	76	UK	Actor	Cromwell; Wild Geese II
January	29	Harold Russell	88	Canada	Actor	The Best Years of Our Lives; Inside Moves
February	1	Hildegard Knef	76	Germany	Actress	The Snows of Kilimanjaro; Fedora
February	4	George Nader	80	US	Actor	Congo Crossing; Four Girls in Town
February	6	Guy Stockwell	68	US	Actor	The War Lord; Tobruk
February	7	Diane Hart	75	UK	Actress	The Wicked Lady; Happy Go Lovely
February	9	Judson Pratt	85	US	Actor	The Horse Soldiers; Vigilante Force
February	11	Barry Foster	74	UK	Actor	Frenzy; Ryan's Daughter
February	13	Waylon Jennings	64	US	Singer, Actor	Nashville Rebel; Moonrunners
February	15	Lucille Lund	88	US	Actress	Prison Shadows; The Black Cat
February	18	Giustino Durano	78	Italy	Actor	Life Is Beautiful; Lucky to Be a Woman
February	18	Jack Lambert	81	US	Actor	How the West Was Won; Kiss Me Deadly
February	18	Byrne Piven	72	US	Actor	Being John Malkovich; Miracle on 34th Street
February	19	Gene Ruggiero	91	US	Film Editor	Around the World in 80 Days; The Shop Around the Corner
February	20	Fredric Steinkamp	73	US	Film Editor	Tootsie; Out of Africa
February	21	John Thaw	60	UK	Actor	Chaplin; Sweeney!
February	22	Chuck Jones	89	US	Animator, Director	The Bugs Bunny/Road Runner Movie; Gay Purr-ee
February	24	Mel Stewart	72	US	Actor	Trick Baby; Let's Do It Again
February	25	Claire Davenport	68	UK	Actress	Return of the Jedi; The Elephant Man
February	26	Lawrence Tierney	82	US	Actor	Reservoir Dogs; Dillinger
February	26	Tony Young	64	US	Actor	Charro!; Play It as It Lays
February	27	Spike Milligan	83	India	Actor	Life of Brian; The Big Freeze
February	28	Mary Stuart	75	US	Actress	Adventures of Don Juan; The Big Punch
March	2	Mary Grant	85	UK	Costume Designer	Sweet Smell of Success; We're No Angels
March	4	Eric Flynn	62	China	Actor	Empire of the Sun; Safari 3000
March	4	Shirley Russell	66	UK	Costume Designer	Reds; Tommy
March	10	Irene Worth	85	US	Actress	Deathtrap; Lost in Yonkers
March	16	Carmelo Bene	64	Italy	Actor, Director	One Hamlet Less; Oedipus Rex
March	17	Rosetta LeNoire	90	US	Actress	The Sunshine Boys; Brewster's Millions
March	17	William Witney	86	US	Director	The Crimson Ghost; Adventures of Captain Marvel
March	18	Denis Forest	41	Canada	Actor	The Mask; Cliffhanger
March	23	Richard Sylbert	73	US	Production Designer	Chinatown; The Graduate
March	23	James Culliford	74	UK	Actor	The Trygon Factor; Quatermass and the Pit
March	26	Louis M. Heyward	81	US	Producer, Screenwriter	The Abominable Dr. Phibes; Pajama Party
March	27	Milton Berle	93	US	Actor, Comedian	It's a Mad, Mad, Mad, Mad World; Who's Minding the Mint?
March	27	Dudley Moore	66	UK	Actor	Arthur; 10
March	27	Glen Robinson	87	US	Special Effects Artist	Logan's Run; Earthquake
March	27	Billy Wilder	95	Austria	Director, Screenwriter	Some Like It Hot; Double Indemnity
April	2	Jack Kruschen	80	Canada	Actor	The Apartment; The War of the Worlds
April	3	Roy Huggins	87	US	Screenwriter	Pushover; Too Late for Tears
April	4	Harry O'Connor	44	US	Stuntman	The Perfect Storm; Charlie's Angels
April	6	Nobu McCarthy	67	Canada	Actress	The Geisha Boy; Wake Me When It's Over
April	7	John Agar	81	US	Actor	Sands of Iwo Jima; Fort Apache
April	8	María Félix	88	Mexico	Actress	Enamorada; French Cancan
April	15	Dave King	72	UK	Actor	Reds; The Long Good Friday
April	16	Alexander Doré	78	UK	Actor	Chitty Chitty Bang Bang; Casino Royale
April	16	Robert Urich	55	US	Actor	Magnum Force; Turk 182
April	17	James Copeland	84	UK	Actor	Torture Garden; The Private Life of Sherlock Holmes
April	18	Thor Heyerdahl	87	Norway	Documentarian	Kon-Tiki; Ra
April	19	Reginald Rose	81	US	Screenwriter	12 Angry Men; The Wild Geese
April	21	Terry Walsh	62	UK	Stuntman	Who Framed Roger Rabbit; Superman III
April	22	Linda Lovelace	53	US	Actress	Deep Throat; Linda Lovelace for President
April	23	Carla Fry	40	US	Producer, Executive	The Mask; Lost in Space
April	25	Michael Bryant	74	UK	Actor	Gandhi; Hamlet
April	28	John Wilkinson	82	US	Sound Engineer	Platoon; Breakfast at Tiffany's
May	2	Sihung Lung	72	China	Actor	The Wedding Banquet; Crouching Tiger, Hidden Dragon
May	2	Ron Soble	74	US	Actor	Papillion; True Grit
May	4	John Kohn	76-77	US	Screenwriter, Producer	The Collector; Shanghai Surprise
May	5	George Sidney	85	US	Director	Show Boat; Annie Get Your Gun
May	8	Lou Lombardo	91	US	Film Editor	The Wild Bunch; Moonstruck
May	10	Linda Francis	62	US	Casting Director	Swingers; Prince of Darkness
May	11	Bill Peet	87	US	Screenwriter	Dumbo; Peter Pan
May	14	Ray Stricklyn	73	US	Actor	Young Jesse James; The Lost World
May	15	Bryan Pringle	67	UK	Actor	Brazil; Three Men and a Little Lady
May	23	Albert Carrier	82	Canada	Actor	Scarface; Fitzwilly
May	23	Roy Field	87	UK	Special Effects Artist	Superman; The Dark Crystal
May	23	Dorothy Spencer	93	US	Film Editor	Stagecoach; Cleopatra
May	25	Pat Coombs	75	UK	Actress	Willy Wonka & the Chocolate Factory; Carry On Doctor
June	2	Herman Cohen	76	US	Producer	I Was a Teenage Werewolf; Berserk!
June	3	Lew Wasserman	89	US	Studio Executive	
June	3	Sam Whipple	41	US	Actor	The Rock; The Doors
June	7	Signe Hasso	86	Sweden	Actress	Where There's Life; Johnny Angel
June	7	James Luisi	73	US	Actor	Killer's Delight; The Hidden
June	14	Albert Band	78	France	Director, Producer	The Young Guns; Troll
June	21	Sidney Armus	77	US	Actor	Sleepless in Seattle; One Fine Day
June	22	Chang Cheh	79	China	Director, Screenwriter	The One-Armed Swordsman; Vengeance
June	23	Enzo Barboni	79	Italy	Director, Screenwriter, Cinematographer	They Call Me Trinity; Crime Busters
June	25	Charles C. Bennett	62	US	Production Designer	New Jack City; Hoodlum
June	26	Dolores Gray	78	US	Actress	The Opposite Sex; Designing Woman
June	28	François Périer	82	France	Actor	Nights of Cabiria; Orpheus
June	29	Rosemary Clooney	74	US	Singer, Actress	White Christmas; Red Garters
July	4	Ivan Moffat	84	Cuba	Screenwriter	Giant; Black Sunday
July	5	Katy Jurado	78	Mexico	Actress	High Noon; One-Eyed Jacks
July	6	John Frankenheimer	72	US	Director, Producer	The Manchurian Candidate; Ronin
July	8	Ward Kimball	88	US	Animator	Snow White and the Seven Dwarfs; Mary Poppins
July	9	Gerald Campion	81	UK	Actor	Chitty Chitty Bang Bang; Little Dorrit
July	9	Rod Steiger	77	US	Actor	In the Heat of the Night; On the Waterfront
July	15	Phil Roth	72	US	Actor	One Flew Over the Cuckoo's Nest; Harry and Tonto
July	17	Harry W. Gerstad	93	US	Film Editor	High Noon; Champion
July	18	Vince Howard	72	US	Actor	Trouble Man; Lethal Weapon 3
July	23	Leo McKern	82	Australia	Actor	A Man for All Seasons; Ladyhawke
July	24	Maurice Denham	92	UK	Actor	Animal Farm; The Day of the Jackal
July	26	Buddy Baker	84	US	Composer	The Fox and the Hound; Napoleon and Samantha
July	29	Peter Bayliss	80	UK	Actor	From Russia with Love; Vampira
July	31	Pauline Chan Bo-Lin	29	China	Actress	From Beijing with Love; Flying Dagger
August	3	Peter Miles	64	US	Actor	Quo Vadis; Possessed
August	9	Peter Matz	73	US	Composer, Arranger, Conductor	Funny Lady; Marlowe
August	14	Peter R. Hunt	77	UK	Film Editor, Director	On Her Majesty's Secret Service; Dr. No
August	15	Henry Batista	88	US	Film Editor	The Caine Mutiny; Riders in the Sky
August	15	Yuriy Yakovlev	71	Bulgaria	Actor	The Past-Master; Farsighted for Two Diopters
August	16	Jeff Corey	88	US	Actor	Butch Cassidy and the Sundance Kid; Little Big Man
August	18	Dean Riesner	83	US	Screenwriter	Dirty Harry; Play Misty for Me
August	23	Dennis Fimple	78	US	Actor	King Kong; House of 1000 Corpses
August	25	Stanley R. Greenberg	74	US	Screenwriter	Soylent Green; Skyjacked
August	30	J. Lee Thompson	88	UK	Director	The Guns of Navarone; Cape Fear
September	3	Ted Ross	68	US	Actor	The Wiz; Arthur
September	5	Cliff Gorman	65	US	Actor	All That Jazz; Night and the City
September	7	Katrin Cartlidge	41	UK	Actress	From Hell; Breaking the Waves
September	7	Michael Elphick	55	UK	Actor	Cry of the Banshee; O Lucky Man!
September	11	Kim Hunter	79	US	Actress	A Streetcar Named Desire; Planet of the Apes
September	14	Michael Greer	64	US	Actor	The Gay Deceivers; The Rose
September	14	LaWanda Page	81	US	Actress	Zapped!; Friday
September	16	James Gregory	90	US	Actor	The Manchurian Candidate; The Sons of Katie Elder
September	18	Hazel Brooks	78	South Africa	Actress	Body and Soul; Arch of Triumph
September	20	Sergei Bodrov Jr.	30	US	Actor	Brother; Prisoner of the Mountains
September	22	Carmen Phillips	65	US	Actress	Easy Rider; Please Don't Eat the Daisies
September	27	P.A. Lundgren	91	Sweden	Art Director, Production Designer	The Seventh Seal; Through a Glass Darkly
September	28	Whitney Blake	76	US	Actress	My Gun Is Quick; -30-
October	3	Tad Horino	81	US	Actor	Mulholland Drive; Red Sonja
October	4	André Delvaux	76	Belgium	Director	The Man Who Had His Hair Cut Short; Rendezvous at Bray
October	4	Buddy Lester	85	US	Actor	Ocean's 11; The Nutty Professor
October	8	Phyllis Calvert	87	UK	Actress	Indiscreet; Oh! What a Lovely War
October	9	Charles Guggenheim	78	US	Documentarian	The Johnstown Flood; Robert Kennedy Remembered
October	10	Teresa Graves	54	US	Actress	Vampira; Black Eye
October	12	Hilyard M. Brown	92	US	Art Director	Cleopatra; The Night of the Hunter
October	13	Keene Curtis	79	US	Actor	Macbeth; Sliver
October	13	Dennis Patrick	84	US	Actor	Joe; House of Dark Shadows
October	18	Chuck Domanico	58	US	Musician	Midnight Run; The Truth About Cats & Dogs
October	21	George Hall	85	Canada	Actor	Big Daddy; Mrs Brown
October	23	Adolph Green	87	US	Screenwriter, Lyricist, Actor	Singin' in the Rain; My Favorite Year
October	23	Marianne Hoppe	93	Germany	Actress	The Rider on the White Horse; Wrong Move
October	23	Nathan Juran	95	Romania	Director	The 7th Voyage of Sinbad; 20 Million Miles to Earth
October	24	Charmian May	65	UK	Actress	Bridget Jones's Diary; The Dawning
October	24	Peggy Moran	84	US	Actress	The Mummy's Hand; King of the Cowboys
October	24	Scott Plank	43	US	Actor	Holes; Mr. Baseball
October	25	Micheline Cheirel	85	France	Actress	Flight to Nowhere; Cornered
October	25	Richard Harris	72	UK	Actor	A Man Called Horse; Gladiator
October	25	Rainbeaux Smith	47	US	Actress	Cinderella; Massacre at Central High
October	27	André de Toth	90	Hungary	Director, Screenwriter	House of Wax; The Gunfighter
October	28	Margaret Booth	104	US	Film Editor	Mutiny on the Bounty; The Way We Were
October	28	Lawrence Dobkin	83	US	Actor, Director	Patton; The Ten Commandments
October	29	Marina Berti	78	Italy	Actress	Prince of Foxes; Eager to Live
October	29	Glenn McQueen	41	Canada	Animator	Toy Story; Monsters, Inc.
October	30	Juan Antonio Bardem	80	Spain	Director	Death of a Cyclist; Foul Play
October	30	Lee H. Katzin	67	US	Director	What Ever Happened to Aunt Alice?; Le Mans
October	31	Raf Vallone	86	Italy	Actor	Bitter Rice; The Godfather Part III
November	1	Keith A. Wester	62	US	Sound Engineer	The Rock; Air Force One
November	2	Lo Lieh	63	Indonesia	Actor	King Boxer; The 36th Chamber of Shaolin
November	3	Jonathan Harris	87	US	Actor	Botany Bay; The Big Fisherman
November	4	Antonio Margheriti	72	Italy	Director, Screenwriter	Code Name: Wild Geese; The Stranger and the Gunfighter
November	8	Jack Solomon	89	US	Sound Engineer	Hello, Dolly!; King Kong
November	14	Eddie Bracken	87	US	Actor	The Miracle of Morgan's Creek; Home Alone 2: Lost in New York
November	17	Marvin Mirisch	84	US	Producer	Romantic Comedy; Dracula
November	18	James Coburn	74	US	Actor	The Great Escape; Affliction
November	22	Parley Baer	88	US	Actor	The Young Lions; The Ugly Dachshund
November	22	Joan Barclay	88	US	Actress	The Singing Outlaw; The Shanghai Cobra
November	22	Adele Jergens	84	US	Actress	The Dark Past; Down to Earth
November	23	Jackie Gayle	76	US	Actor, Comedian	Broadway Danny Rose; Bulworth
November	24	Noel Davis	75	UK	Casting Director	Reds; Robin Hood: Prince of Thieves
November	25	Karel Reisz	76	Czech Republic	Director, Producer	The French Lieutenant's Woman; Isadora
November	26	Stanley Black	89	UK	Composer, Conductor	The Day the Earth Caught Fire; The Trollenberg Terror
November	27	Billie Bird	94	US	Actress	Sixteen Candles; Dennis the Menace
November	27	Wolfgang Preiss	92	Germany	Actor	The Longest Day; A Bridge Too Far
November	29	Daniel Gélin	81	France	Actor	The Man Who Knew Too Much; Murmur of the Heart
November	29	John Justin	85	UK	Actor	The Thief of Bagdad; The Big Sleep
December	2	Edgar Scherick	78	US	Producer	The Stepford Wives; The Taking of Pelham One Two Three
December	3	Klaus Löwitsch	66	Germany	Actor	Cross of Iron; Firefox
December	3	Glenn Quinn	32	Ireland	Actor	Live Nude Girls; Dr. Giggles
December	10	Peter Tanner	88	UK	Film Editor	Kind Hearts and Coronets; Hamburger Hill
December	12	Brad Dexter	85	US	Actor	The Magnificent Seven; The Asphalt Jungle
December	14	Sidney Glazier	86	US	Producer	The Producers; Take the Money and Run
December	14	Ruth Kobart	78	US	Actress	Dirty Harry; Sister Act
December	15	Arthur Jeph Parker	79	US	Set Decorator	Silverado; Private Benjamin
December	17	James Hazeldine	55	UK	Actor	Pink Floyd – The Wall; The Ruling Class
December	18	Edward Norris	91	US	Actor	Career Girl; Decoy
December	22	Duke Callaghan	88	US	Cinematographer	Conan the Barbarian; Jeremiah Johnson
December	22	Susan Fleming	94	US	Actress	Million Dollar Legs; Range Feud
December	22	Joe Strummer	50	Turkey	Singer, Composer	Walker; Grosse Pointe Blank
December	22	Clay Tanner	71	US	Actor	Rosemary's Baby; The Outlaw Josey Wales
December	22	Kenneth Tobey	85	US	Actor	The Thing from Another World; The Candidate
December	25	William T. Orr	85	US	Producer, Actor	Sex and the Single Girl; Wicked, Wicked
December	27	George Roy Hill	81	US	Director	The Sting; Butch Cassidy and the Sundance Kid
December	30	Mary Brian	96	US	Actress	The Virginian; The Front Page
December	30	Antony Ponzini	69	US	Actor	Friday the 13th: The Final Chapter; The Other Side of Midnight

== Film debuts ==
- Fred Armisen – Like Mike
- Beyoncé – Austin Powers in Goldmember
- Lake Bell – Speakeasy
- Jon Bernthal – Mary/Mary
- Abigail Breslin – Signs
- Kristin Chenoweth – Topa Topa Bluffs
- Priyanka Chopra – Thamizhan
- Joshua Close – K-19: The Widowmaker
- Martin Compston – Sweet Sixteen
- Jean Dujardin – Ah! Si j'étais riche
- Jesse Eisenberg – Roger Dodger
- America Ferrera – Real Women Have Curves
- Josh Gad – Mary and Joe
- Romola Garai – Nicholas Nickleby
- Brian Geraghty – Petty Crimes
- Maggie Grace – Shop Club
- Javier Gutiérrez – The Other Side of the Bed
- Kevin Hart – Paper Soldiers
- Sally Hawkins – All or Nothing
- Emile Hirsch – The Dangerous Lives of Altar Boys
- Rachel House – Whale Rider
- Kevin James – Pinocchio
- Diane Kruger – The Piano Player
- Derek Luke – Antwone Fisher
- Anthony Mackie – 8 Mile
- Joe Manganiello – Spider-Man
- Rachel McAdams – My Name Is Tanino
- Elliot Page – Marion Bridge
- Nathan Phillips – Australian Rules
- Rosamund Pike – Die Another Day
- Clémence Poésy – Olgas Sommer
- Manolo Solo – Everything in Place
- Sam Spruell – K-19: The Widowmaker
- Aaron Taylor-Johnson – Tom & Thomas
- Natalia Tena – About a Boy
- Sofía Vergara – Big Trouble
- Katt Williams – Friday After Next
