= List of Nepalese films of 2002 =

A list of the earliest films produced in the Cinema of Nepal, ordered by year of release from 2002. For an alphabetical list of articles on Nepalese films, see Category:Nepalese films.

Title	Director	Cast	Genre	Notes
2002
Ajambhari Maya				
Anjuli				
Baacha Bandhan				
BabuSaheb				
Bakshis				
Bhagya Le Jurayo				
Bhai Tika				
Darpan Chaya	Tulsi Ghimire	Dilip Raimajhi, Niruta Singh and Uttam Pradhan	Comedy, Drama	
Dhansamphati				
Hateri			Action	
Maan			Drama	
Malai Maaf Garidau				
Malati				
Mama Bhanja				
Mamaghar				
Manmandir				
Maya Namara				
Melong				
Mero Hajur				
Mitini				
Mohani Lagla Hai				
Muskan				
Pheri Temro Yaad Aayo				
Pijanda				
Pirati Aafai Hudon Rahechha				
Pooja				
Rickshaw Puller, The				
Sahid Gate				
Santan Ko Maya				
Sanyas				
Shadhyantra				
Yastai Rahecha Jindagi				
