= Eduard de Atzel =

Peruvian sports shooter (1917–2002)

Personal information
- Full name: G. Eduard de Atzel Gyulay
- Born: 11 March 1917 Budapest, Austria-Hungary
- Died: 16 May 2002 (aged 85) Budapest, Hungary

Sport
- Sport: Sports shooting

Eduard de Atzel (11 March 1917 – 16 May 2002) was a Peruvian sports shooter. He competed at the 1960 Summer Olympics and the 1964 Summer Olympics.
