= Lucien Bochard =

French footballer (1925-2002)

Personal information
- Date of birth: 10 August 1925
- Date of death: 2 May 2002 (aged 76)
- Position: Defender

International career
Years	Team	Apps	(Gls)
- France

Lucien Bochard (10 August 1925 – 2 May 2002) was a French footballer. He competed in the men's tournament at the 1952 Summer Olympics.
