= You Jih-cheng =

Taiwanese politician

- 游日正
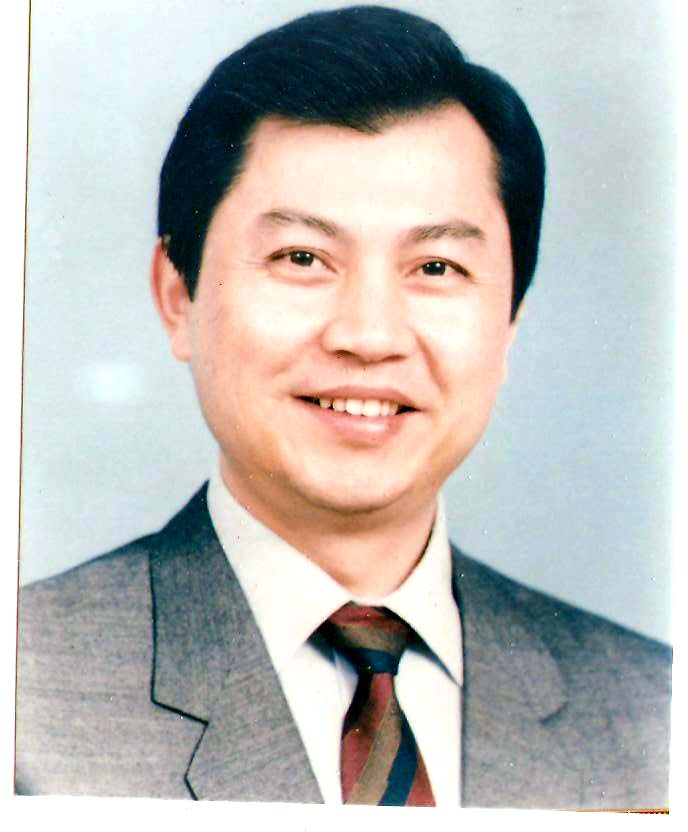
- You during his term as a member of the Legislative Yuan.

Member of the Legislative Yuan
- In office 1 February 1993 – 31 January 1996

Personal details
- Born: May 15, 1949 Longtan District, Taoyuan, Taiwan
- Died: May 25, 2002 (aged 53) China Airlines Flight 611, 23 nautical miles (26 mi; 43 km) northeast of Magong, Penghu Islands, Taiwan Strait
- Party: Kuomintang
- Education: National Taiwan University (BA)

You Jih-cheng
- Chinese: 游日正
Transcriptions
Standard Mandarin
- Hanyu Pinyin: Yóu Rìzhèng

You Jih-cheng (15 May 1949 – 25 May 2002) was a Taiwanese politician who served as the mayor of Longtan District in Taoyuan City and was elected as the second legislator in Taoyuan County on behalf of the Kuomintang party. He was killed in the crash of China Airlines Flight 611 on 25 May 2002. The Boeing 747 operating the flight broke apart in mid-air near Magong, Penghu. All 225 people on board including You Jih-cheng were killed and he was among the 50 bodies that have never been found or identified.
