= Ulysses Redd =

American baseball player

- Shortstop
- Born: November 13, 1914; Baton Rouge, Louisiana, U.S.
- Died: November 17, 2002 (aged 88); Baton Rouge, Louisiana, U.S.
- Batted: Right Threw: Right

Negro league baseball debut
- 1940, for the Birmingham Black Barons

Last appearance
- 1941, for the Birmingham Black Barons
- Stats at Baseball Reference

Teams
- Birmingham Black Barons (1940–1941)

Ulysses Adolph Redd (November 13, 1914 – November 17, 2002), nicknamed "Hickey", was an American Negro league shortstop for the Birmingham Black Barons in 1940 and 1941.

A native of Baton Rouge, Louisiana, Redd served in the US Army during World War II. He played for the Harlem Globetrotters in 1947. Redd died in Baton Rouge in 2002 at age 88.
