= List of Pakistani films of 2002 =

List of Pakistani films by year 2002

This is a list of films produced in Pakistan in 2002 and in the Urdu language

== 2002 ==
Title	Director	Cast	Genre	Notes
2020
Baghawat		Sana, Shaan, Nirma		
Behram Daku		Saima, Shaan, Babur		
Border		Sana, Shaan, Reema		
Babbu Khan		Saima, Shaan, Bader Munir		
Chalo Ishq Larain	Sajjad Gul	Meera, Zara Sheikh, Ali Haider	Musical, Comedy, Romance	The film was released in April 2002
Daku		Saima, Shaan, Noor		
Fire		Reema, Mohammar Rana		The film was released on 6 December 2002
Ghazi Ilmuddin Shaheed		Noor, Moamar Rana		
Geo Jatta		Reema, Nazo, Baber Ali, Saud		
Ishtehari		Sana, Shaan, Laila		
Jahad		Saima, Shaan, Meera		
Kon Banega Karorpati		Reema, Moamar Rana		
Khuda Qasam		Reema, Saud, Amman		
Maneela Ke Jasoos		Sana, Shaan, Babur		
Mohabbat Mar Nahin Sakti				
Pehla Sajdah		Aleena, Balal, Rashid		
Raqasa		Meera, Shaan, Resham		
Shikari Haseena		Haseena, Shaan, Babur Ali		
Sholay		Saima, Shaan, Reema		
Toofaan		Saima, Shaan, Moamar		
Yeh Dil Aap Ka Huwa	Javed Sheikh	Babar Ali, Veena Malik, Moammar Rana, Sana, Javed Sheikh, Saleem Sheikh	Romance	The film was released on July 19, 2002

== See also ==
- 2002 in Pakistan
