= Cecil Cole =

American baseball player

- Pitcher
- Born: September 23, 1919; Connellsville, Pennsylvania, U.S.
- Died: June 20, 2002 (aged 82); Connellsville, Pennsylvania, U.S.
- Batted: Right Threw: Right

Negro league baseball debut
- 1946, for the Newark Eagles

Last appearance
- 1946, for the Newark Eagles
- Stats at Baseball Reference

Teams
- Newark Eagles (1946)

Cecil Edward Cole (September 23, 1919 – June 20, 2002) was an American Negro league pitcher in the 1940s.

A native of Connellsville, Pennsylvania, Cole graduated from Connellsville High School in 1937, and served in the US Army during World War II. He played for the Newark Eagles during their 1946 Negro World Series championship season. Cole went on to become a scout for the Pittsburgh Pirates for 35 years. He died in Connellsville in 2002 at age 82.
