= Willie Young (baseball) =

American baseball player

- Pitcher
- Born: July 12, 1912; Birmingham, Alabama, U.S.
- Died: August 8, 2002 (aged 90); Birmingham, Alabama, U.S.
- Batted: Left Threw: Left

Negro league baseball debut
- 1945, for the Birmingham Black Barons

Last appearance
- 1945, for the Birmingham Black Barons

Teams
- Birmingham Black Barons (1945)

Willie Clarence Young Jr. (July 12, 1912 – August 8, 2002) was an American Negro league pitcher for the Birmingham Black Barons in 1945.

A native of Birmingham, Alabama, Young was born without a right hand. He died in Birmingham in 2002 at age 90.
