= China Airlines Flight 611 =

2002 aviation accident in the Taiwan Strait

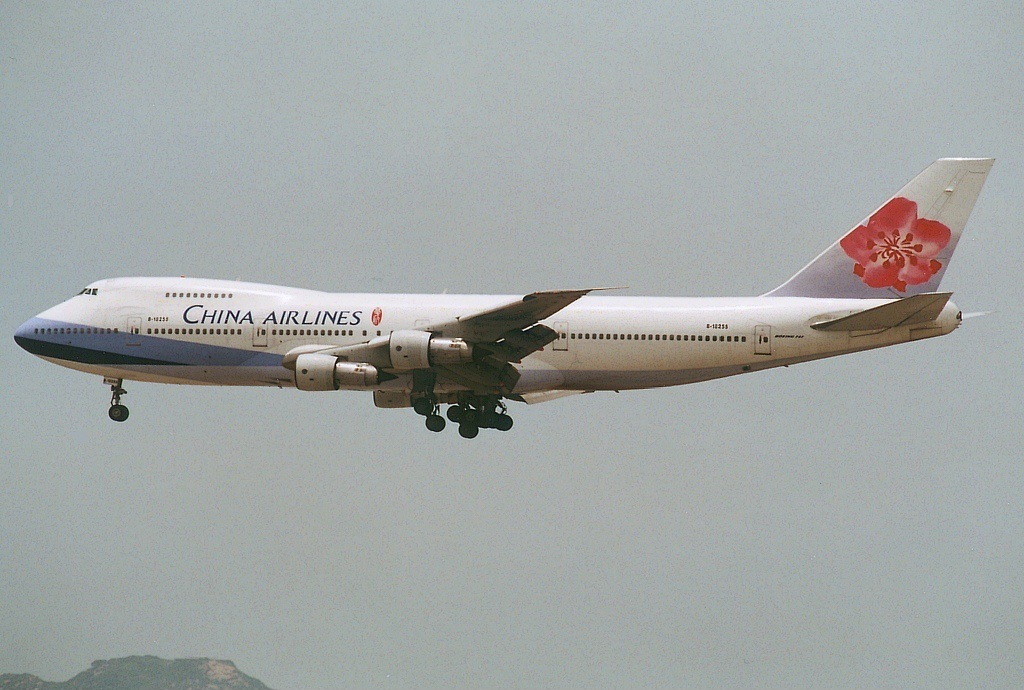
- B-18255, the aircraft involved in the accident, seen in 2000

Accident
- Date: 25 May 2002
- Summary: In-flight breakup due to incorrect tailstrike repair
- Site: Taiwan Strait, 28 miles (24 nmi; 45 km) NE of Magong, Penghu Islands, Taiwan; 23°59′23″N 119°40′45″E

Aircraft
- Aircraft type: Boeing 747-209B
- Operator: China Airlines
- IATA flight No.: CI611
- ICAO flight No.: CAL611
- Call sign: DYNASTY 611
- Registration: B-18255
- Flight origin: Chiang Kai-shek International Airport, Taoyuan, Taiwan
- Destination: Hong Kong International Airport, Hong Kong
- Occupants: 225
- Passengers: 206
- Crew: 19
- Fatalities: 225
- Survivors: 0

China Airlines Flight 611 was a regularly scheduled international passenger flight operated by a Boeing 747-200 from Chiang Kai-shek International Airport (now Taoyuan International Airport) in Taiwan to Hong Kong International Airport. On May 25th, 2002, the flight disintegrated midair and crashed into the Taiwan Strait, 26 miles (23 nmi; 42 km) northeast of the Penghu Islands, 20 minutes after takeoff, killing all 225 people on board. The in-flight breakup was caused by metal fatigue cracks from a tailstrike at Kai Tak Airport on 7 of February 1980 after which the aircraft was not properly repaired according to Boeing policies and manuals. Metal fatigue from over 22 years of service and repeated pressurization cycles caused tiny cracks that led to the aircraft's breakup.

The crash remains the deadliest in Taiwan, as well as the most recent accident with fatalities involving China Airlines, and the second-deadliest accident in China Airlines history, behind China Airlines Flight 140 with 264 fatalities.

== Aircraft ==
The aircraft involved, registered as B-18255, was the only Boeing 747-200 passenger aircraft left in China Airlines's fleet at the time. The plane was delivered new to the airline on 2 August 1979, and spent its entire life with the airline. The aircraft had logged more than 64,800 hours of flight time at the time of the accident. The plane was equipped with 4 Pratt and Whitney JT9D-7AW engines and had a 355-seat configuration. The accident flight was to be the aircraft's penultimate flight for China Airlines, as it was scheduled to be delivered to Orient Thai Airlines after its return flight from Hong Kong to Taipei. Only four passenger 747-200s were delivered to China Airlines, all from 1979 to 1980. The other three had been in full passenger service until 1999 when they were converted to freighters. They were immediately grounded by the ROC's Civil Aviation Administration (CAA) after the crash for maintenance checks.

== Accident ==
The flight took off at 15:08 Taipei local time (07:08 UTC), and was originally scheduled to arrive at Hong Kong at 16:45 Hong Kong Time (08:45 UTC). The flight crew consisted of 51-year-old Captain Yi Ching-Fong, (Note: traditional Chinese: 易清豐; simplified Chinese: 易清丰; Hanyu Pinyin: Yì Qīngfēng; Tongyong Pinyin: I Cingfong) 52-year-old First Officer Shieh Yea-Shyong, (Note: traditional Chinese: 謝亞雄; simplified Chinese: 谢亚雄; Hanyu Pinyin: Xiè Yàxióng; Tongyong Pinyin: Syieh Yasyong) and 54-year-old Flight Engineer Chao Sen-Kuo. (Note: traditional Chinese: 趙盛國; simplified Chinese: 赵盛国; Hanyu Pinyin: Zhào Shèngguó; Tongyong Pinyin: Jhao Shengkuo) All three pilots were highly experienced – both pilots had more than 10,100 hours of flying time and the flight engineer had logged more than 19,100 flight hours.

At 15:16 Taipei local time, the flight was cleared to climb to flight level 350—about 35,000 feet (11,000 m). At 15:33, contact with the plane was lost. Chang Chia-juch, the Taiwanese Vice Minister of Transportation and Communications at that time, said that two Cathay Pacific aircraft in the area received B-18255's emergency location-indicator signals. All 206 passengers and 19 crew members on board the aircraft were killed.

== Passengers ==
The passengers included Taiwanese politician You Jih-cheng. and two reporters from the United Daily News. Most of the passengers, 114 people, were members of a Taiwanese group tour to China organised by four travel agencies.

Nationality	Total
Taiwan	209 (Note: 190 passengers and 19 crew members)
China	9
Hong Kong	5
Singapore	1
Switzerland	1
Total	225

Of the 225 passengers and crew on board, remains of 175 were recovered and identified. The first 82 bodies were found floating on the ocean surface of the Taiwan Strait, and were recovered by fishing boats and military vessels. Contracted recovery vessels were subsequently used for the recovery of the aircraft wreckage and the remaining bodies.

The victims were identified by visual identification, personal effects, fingerprints, dental examinations, and through DNA testing. Only the three recovered flight crew member bodies were autopsied. The victims' bodies were photographed and their clothing and possessions were catalogued and returned to the victims' families. The victims' records, including body diagrams, injury protocols, photographs, and other documents related to the recovery and identification of the individuals were then correlated for each identified victim.

Most of the victims had extensive injuries consistent with head trauma, tibia and fibula fractures, significant back abrasions, and pelvic injuries. Most of the bodies were nearly intact except, in some cases, for fractured bones. Some of the victims had expansion of lung tissue, subcutaneous emphysema, and bleeding of the nose and mouth. No carbon remains were found on any of the recovered bodies or their clothes, and no sign of fire, burning, or blast damage was found.

== Search, recovery and investigation ==
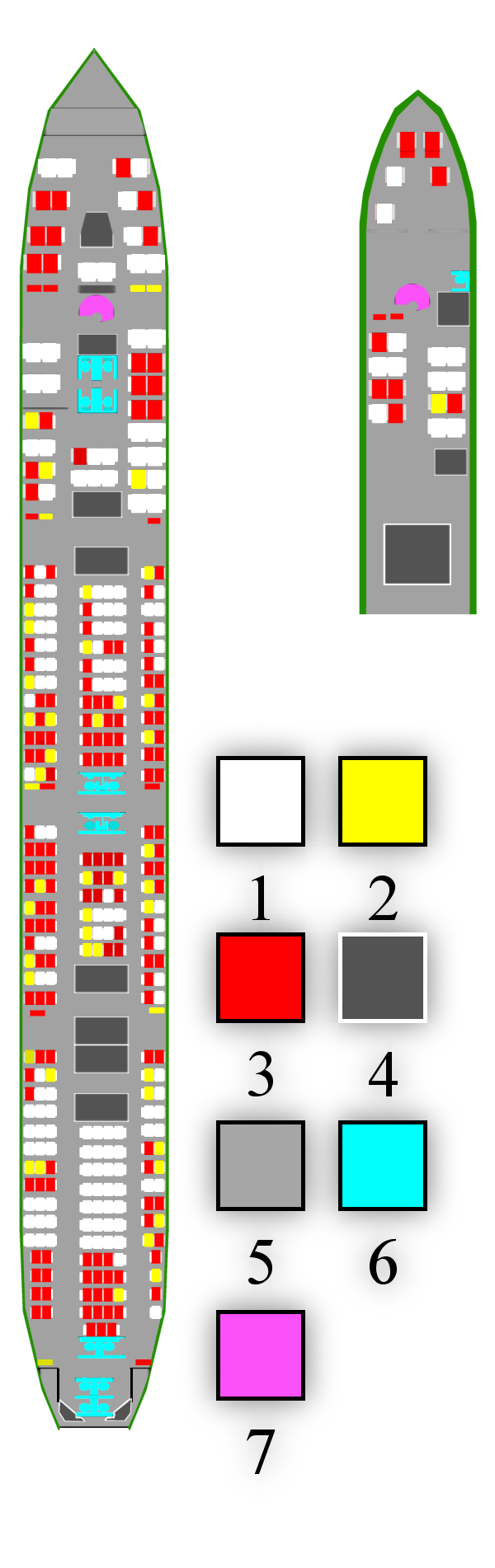
B-18255 seat-plan: Empty seat Not recovered Recovered

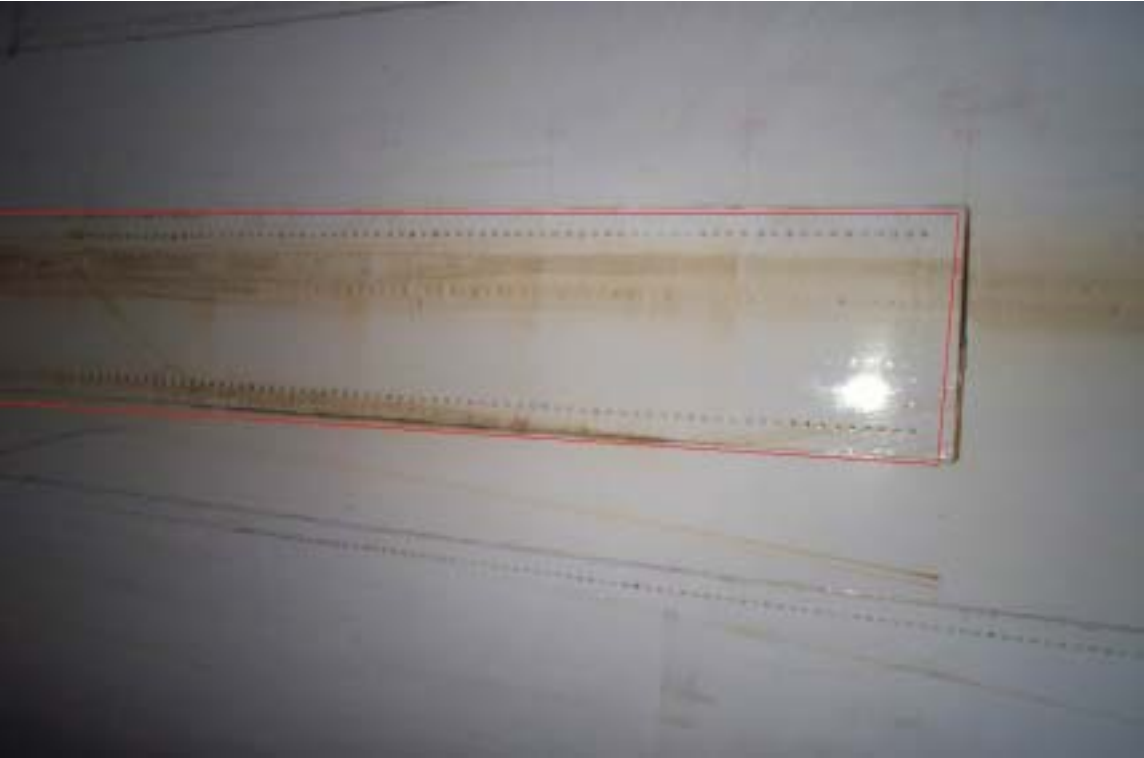
Around 1995, China Airlines started to ban smoking on board. During the time when smoking was still allowed, cabin pressurisation forced the smoke out through the cracks. Over time, the smoke deposited tar stains on the metal. These stains were an indication of possible hidden cracks beneath the doubler plate, which means that the cracks had been there long before 1995.

At 17:05 local time, a military Lockheed C-130 Hercules aircraft spotted a crashed airliner 23 nautical miles (43 km; 26 mi) northeast of Magong, Penghu Islands. Oil slicks were also spotted at 17:05; the first body was found at 18:10.

No distress signal or communication was sent out prior to the crash. Radar data suggest that the aircraft broke into four pieces whilst at FL 350. This theory is supported by the fact that some lighter articles that would have been found inside the aircraft were found up to 81 miles (70 nmi; 130 km) from the crash site at villages in central Taiwan. The items included magazines, documents, luggage, photographs, New Taiwan dollars, aircraft safety cards and a China Airlines-embossed, blood-stained pillow case.

The plane was supposed to be leveling off then, as it approached its cruising altitude of 35,000 ft (11,000 m). Shortly before the breakup, two of the aircraft's four engines began providing slightly higher thrust, which was later found to have been within the normal ranges of deviation. All four engines were recovered from the sea and found not to have suffered any malfunction prior to the crash. Pieces of the aircraft were found in the ocean and on Taiwan, including in the city of Changhua.

The governments of Taiwan and the People's Republic of China co-operated in the recovery of the aircraft; the Chinese allowed personnel from Taiwan to search for bodies and aircraft fragments in those parts of the Taiwan Strait controlled by the People's Republic of China.

China Airlines requested relatives to submit blood samples for DNA testing at the Criminal Investigation Bureau of National Police Administration (now National Police Agency) and two other locations.

The United Daily News stated that some relatives of passengers described the existence of this flight to Hong Kong as being "unnecessary". Most of the passengers intended to arrive in mainland China, but because of a lack of direct air links between Taiwan and mainland China, the travellers had to fly via Hong Kong; the relatives advocated the opening of direct air links between Taiwan and mainland China, which was eventually realised.

== Cause ==
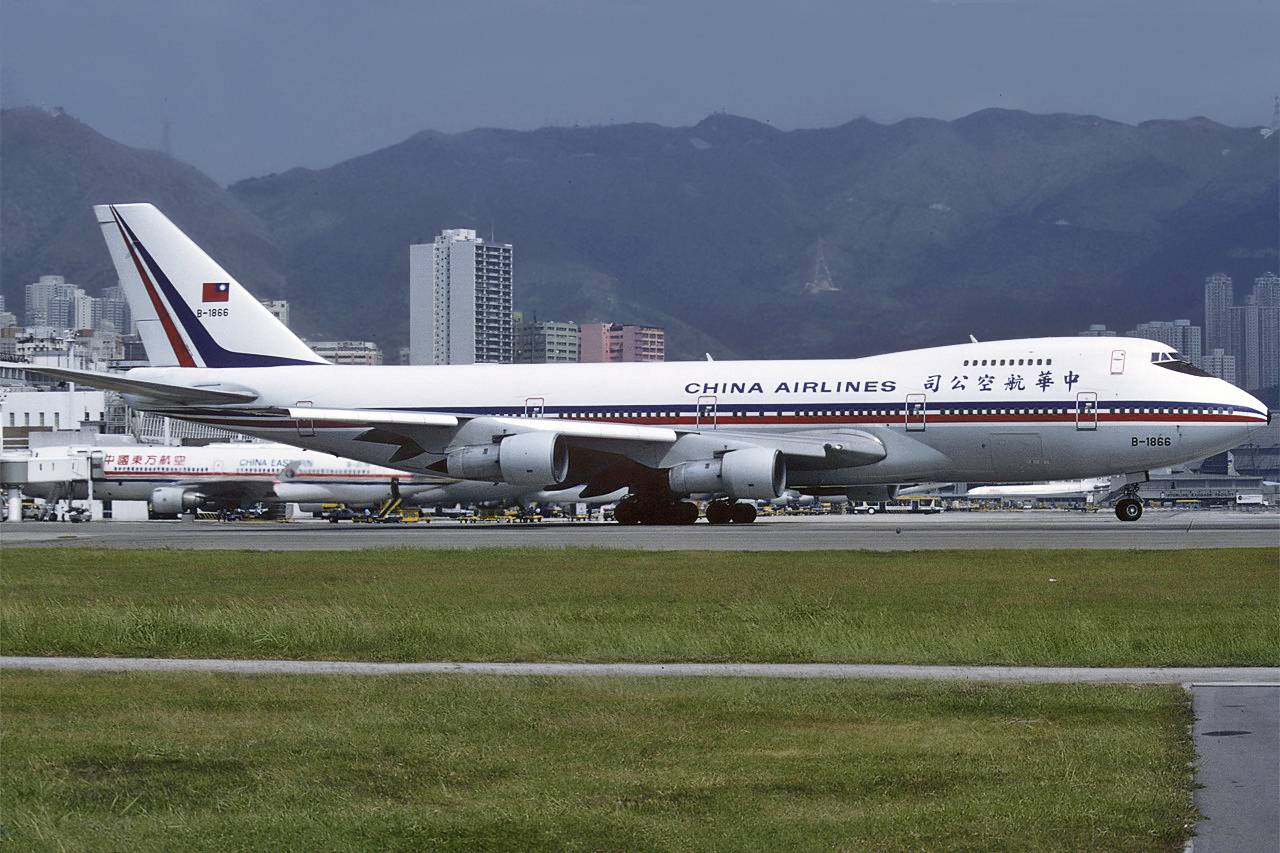
At the time the 1980 tailstrike incident happened, B-18255 was wearing the pre-1995 livery with Republic of China flag on tail fin, also with a previous registration (B-1866), as can be seen here.

The final investigation report found that the accident was the result of metal fatigue cracking caused by an unapproved repair procedure that was performed on the aircraft after a much earlier tailstrike incident. On 7 February 1980, the aircraft was flying from Stockholm Arlanda Airport to Taoyuan International Airport via Jeddah International Airport and Kai Tak Airport as China Airlines Flight 009 (Callsign CAL009, pronounced Dynasty 009). While landing in Hong Kong, part of the plane's tail had scraped along the runway. The aircraft was depressurised, ferried back to Taiwan on the same day, and a temporary repair done the day after. A more permanent repair was conducted by a team from China Airlines from 23 to 26 May 1980.

The permanent repair of the tailstrike was not carried out in accordance with the Boeing Structural Repair Manual (SRM). According to the SRM, repairs could be made by replacing the entire affected skin or by cutting out the damaged portion and installing a reinforcing doubler plate to restore the structural strength. Rather than following the SRM, the China Airlines team installed a doubler over the damaged skin.

Though the kind of damage inflicted on the tail was far beyond the damage that a doubler plate is meant to fix, this accident would have probably not occurred had the doubler been installed properly. This would mean that all of the scratches would be completely contained by the innermost row of fasteners, and the fasteners themselves would be strong enough to stop the propagation of any new and existing fatigue cracks. However, the doubler that was installed on the aircraft was too small, so it failed to completely and effectively cover the damaged area, as scratches were found at, and outside, the outermost row of fasteners securing the doubler. Installing the doubler with scratches remaining outside the rivets provided no protection against the propagation of any concealed cracks beneath the doubler, or worse, in the area between its perimeter and the rows of rivets.

Consequently, after repeated cycles of pressurisation and depressurisation during flight, cracks began to form around the exposed scratches until finally, on 25 May 2002, coincidentally 22 years to the day after the faulty repair was made on the damaged tail, the hull broke open in midair. A rapid decompression occurred once the crack opened up, causing the separation of the aircraft's fuselage at section 46 (aft of the main wingbox). The remainder of the aircraft forward of section 46 entered an abrupt descent, causing all four engines to separate from the wings near-simultaneously, as the engine fuse pins failed at about 29,000 feet (8,800 m). After this point, the wings and fuselage forward of the initial breakpoint remained connected until impact with the sea.

This was not the first time that a 747 had crashed because of a faulty repair following a tailstrike. On 12 August 1985, 17 years before Flight 611's crash and 7 years after the accident aircraft's repair, Japan Air Lines Flight 123 from Tokyo to Osaka with 524 people on board had crashed when the vertical stabiliser was torn off and the hydraulic systems severed by explosive decompression, leaving only four survivors. That crash had been attributed to a faulty repair to the rear pressure bulkhead, which had been damaged in 1978 in a tail strike incident. In both crashes, a doubler plate was not installed according to Boeing standards at the time.

China Airlines disputed much of the report, stating that investigators did not find the pieces of the aircraft that would prove the contents of the investigation report. One piece of evidence during the investigation that came up was the discolouration on the damaged section of the tail from photographs from maintenance records. The discolouration was determined to be tar stains from cigarette and cigar smoke. Smoking was permitted onboard China Airlines' flights until 1995. Had the stains been investigated, the cracks in the fuselage would have been discovered, and the plane might have avoided the fateful flight.

== In popular culture ==
The accident was featured in a Season 7 episode of the Canadian documentary series Mayday (Air Disasters in the U.S.), entitled "Scratching the Surface".

== See also ==
- Japan Air Lines Flight 123, another aviation accident, also caused by a faulty tailstrike repair seven years before the accident
- BOAC Flight 781, another aviation accident involving metal fatigue which caused the aircraft to disintegrate in mid-flight
- Alaska Airlines Flight 261, another aviation accident caused by improper maintenance which caused the aircraft to lose control mid-flight
