= Bob Poser =

American baseball player (1910–2002)

- Pitcher
- Born: March 16, 1910; Columbus, Wisconsin, U.S.
- Died: May 21, 2002 (aged 92); Columbus, Wisconsin, U.S.
- Batted: Left Threw: Right

MLB debut
- April 17, 1932, for the Chicago White Sox

Last MLB appearance
- August 27, 1935, for the St. Louis Browns

MLB statistics
- Win–loss record: 1-1
- Earned run average: 10.05
- Strikeouts: 2
- Stats at Baseball Reference

Teams
- Chicago White Sox (1932); St. Louis Browns (1935)

John Falk "Bob" Poser (March 16, 1910 – May 21, 2002) was an American professional baseball pitcher in Major League Baseball. He played for the Chicago White Sox and St. Louis Browns. Although Poser was listed as a pitcher, he was a good hitting outfielder in the minor leagues, and was used more as a pinch hitter than as a pitcher by the White Sox.
