= Jim McCurine =

American baseball player

- Outfielder
- Born: May 8, 1921; Clinton, Kentucky, U.S.
- Died: May 24, 2002 (aged 81); Chicago, Illinois, U.S.
- Batted: Left Threw: Right

Negro league baseball debut
- 1946, for the Chicago American Giants

Last appearance
- 1949, for the Chicago American Giants

Teams
- Chicago American Giants (1946–1949)

James McCurine Jr. (May 8, 1921 – May 24, 2002), nicknamed "Big Stick", was an American Negro league outfielder for the Chicago American Giants from 1946 to 1949.

A native of Clinton, Kentucky, McCurine's powerful hitting caught the eye of Chicago American Giants manager Candy Jim Taylor in a 1945 exhibition game. Taylor signed him, and McCurine and John "Mule" Miles became one of the top slugging duos in the Negro leagues. McCurine played for the Giants through 1949, and died in Chicago, Illinois in 2002 at age 81.
