= Bill Simms =

American baseball player

- Outfielder
- Born: December 23, 1908; Shreveport, Louisiana, U.S.
- Died: May 10, 2002 (aged 93); Perris, California, U.S.
- Batted: Left Threw: Left

Negro league baseball debut
- 1937, for the Cincinnati Tigers

Last appearance
- 1944, for the Atlanta Black Crackers
- Stats at Baseball Reference

Teams
- Cincinnati Tigers (1937); Chicago American Giants (1937–1940); Kansas City Monarchs (1937, 1941–1943); Atlanta Black Crackers (1944)

Willie Simms (December 23, 1908 – May 10, 2002) was an American professional baseball outfielder in the Negro leagues. He played from 1937 to 1944 with several teams.
