= Larry Napoleon =

American baseball player

- Pitcher
- Born: June 11, 1922; Marion, Louisiana, U.S.
- Died: May 10, 2002 (aged 79); Monroe, Louisiana, U.S.
- Batted: Unknown Threw: Left

Negro leagues baseball debut
- 1947, for the Kansas City Monarchs

Last appearance
- 1947, for the Kansas City Monarchs

Career statistics
- Win–loss record: 1–0
- Earned run average: 3.75
- Strikeouts: 12

Teams
- Kansas City Monarchs (1947)

Lawrence Napoleon Jr. (June 11, 1922 – May 10, 2002) was an American professional baseball pitcher in the Negro leagues. He played with the Kansas City Monarchs in 1947.

A native of Marion, Louisiana, Napoleon served in the US Army during World War II. He died in Monroe, Louisiana in 2002 at age 79.
