= Deaths in June 1994 =

The following is a list of notable deaths in June 1994.

Entries for each day are listed alphabetically by surname. A typical entry lists information in the following sequence:

- Name, age, country of citizenship at birth, subsequent country of citizenship (if applicable), reason for notability, cause of death (if known), and reference.

== June 1994 ==
=== 1 ===
- Jean-Joël Barbier, 74, French writer and pianist.
- David Guthrie Catcheside, 87, British plant geneticist.
- Herrlee Glessner Creel, 89, American sinologist and philosopher.
- Henri Desroche, 79, French sociologist.
- David Fairbairn, 77, Australian politician.
- Frances Heflin, 73, American actress, lung cancer.
- Frans Mosman, 89, Dutch Olympic fencer (1928, 1936, 1948).
- Jack Stroud, 66, American football player (New York Giants).
- Bill Webb, 80, American baseball player (Philadelphia Phillies).
- John Yurchey, 76, American football player (Pittsburgh Steelers).

=== 2 ===
- Odd Dahl, 95, Norwegian engineer and explorer.
- Mort Flohr, 82, American baseball player (Philadelphia Athletics).
- Ole Hegge, 95, Norwegian cross-country skier, ski jumper and Olympian (1928, 1932).
- Sandhya Kumari, 49, Sri Lankan actress.
- Paul Miller, 81, American football player (Green Bay Packers).
- Phil O'Donohue, 67, Australian rules footballer.
- David Stove, 66, Australian philosopher, suicide.

=== 3 ===
- Puig Aubert, 69, French rugby player, and football player and coach, heart attack.
- Duarte de Almeida Bello, 72, Portuguese Olympic sailor (1948, 1952, 1956, 1960, 1964).
- Stuart Blanch, 76, English Anglican priest, bishop and archbishop.
- Savaş Buldan, 30, Kurdish businessman, homicide.
- Jack Cowie, 82, New Zealand cricket player.
- William Everson, 81, American poet and literary critic.
- Wally Fowler, 77, American gospel music singer, manager, and music promoter.
- Harry Hickox, 83, American actor.
- Les Johnson, 77, Australian rules footballer.
- Tribhuvandas Kishibhai Patel, 90, Indian politician.
- Lucien Prival, 92, American film actor.
- Jack Stroud, 66, American gridiron football player.
- Pablo Muñoz Vega, 91, Ecuadorian Roman Catholic prelate and Jesuit.

=== 4 ===
- Giovanni Azzini, 64, Italian football player and Olympian (1952).
- Toto Bissainthe, 60, Haitian actress and singer, liver cancer.
- Zeke Clements, 82, American country musician.
- Jean Daetwyler, 87, Swiss composer and musician.
- Vittorio Dagianti, 75, Italian footballer.
- Derek Leckenby, 51, English musician and lead guitarist, non-Hodgkin lymphoma
- Roberto Burle Marx, 84, Brazilian landscape architect, painter, naturalist, and musician.
- Stephen McNally, 82, American actor, heart failure.
- Gregory Scarpa, 66, American mobster and FBI informant, AIDS-related complications.
- Peter Thorneycroft, Baron Thorneycroft, 84, British politician.
- Massimo Troisi, 41, Italian actor, cabaret performer, screenwriter, and film director (Il Postino: The Postman, I'm Starting from Three), heart attack.
- Anatoli Vasiliev, 77, Russian/Soviet realist painter, he was one of the representatives of the Leningrad School of Painting
- Earle Warren, 79, American saxophonist.

=== 5 ===
- Krishna Chaithanya, 75, Indian writer.
- Albert McDonald Cole, 92, American politician, member of the United States House of Representatives (1945-1953).
- Nikolay Dementyev, 78, Soviet/Russian football player and coach.
- Buraro Detudamo, 63, Nauruan politician.
- Mario Recordón, 71, Chilean athlete and Olympian (1948).
- Robert Howard Schnacke, 80, American district judge (United States District Court for the Northern District of California).

=== 6 ===
- Yohai Ben-Nun, 69, Israeli Navy general.
- Ramdew Chaitoe, 51, Surinamese artist and a harmonium player.
- Johnny Downs, 80, American child actor, singer, and dancer, cancer.
- Princess Faiza Fuad of Egypt, 70, Egyptian princess and a Muhammad Ali Dynasty member.
- Peter Graves, 82, English actor and nobleman, heart attack.
- Miloud Hadefi, 45, Algerian football player and manager.
- Bill Hoffman, 92, American gridiron football player (Frankford Yellow Jackets).
- Mark McManus, 59, Scottish actor, pneumonia.
- Nicholas Spanos, 52, American professor of psychology, plane crash.
- Barry Sullivan, 81, American movie actor.

=== 7 ===
- Verlon Biggs, 51, American gridiron football player (New York Jets, Washington Redskins), leukemia.
- Rudolph Cartier, 90, Austrian television director, filmmaker, screenwriter and producer.
- Vince Cross, 75, Australian rules footballer.
- Anatolii Dorodnitsyn, 83, Russian mathematician, physicist, and professor.
- Willie Humphrey, 93, American jazz clarinetist.
- Vincent Nsengiyumva, 58, Rwandan prelate of the Roman Catholic Church, homicide.
- Serafim Pereira, 50, Portuguese footballer.
- Dennis Potter, 59, English television dramatist, screenwriter and journalist (Pennies from Heaven, Blue Remembered Hills, The Singing Detective), pancreatic cancer.

=== 8 ===
- Eddie Ambrose, 100, American jockey in thoroughbred horse racing.
- Antonietta Baistrocchi, 38, Italian Olympic basketball player (1980).
- Enrico Calcaterra, 89, Italian ice hockey player and Olympian (1936).
- Fritz Gaiser, 87, German Olympic cross-country skier (1936).
- Eddie King, 82, Canadian Olympic middle-distance runner (1932).
- William Marshall, 76, American singer, bandleader and a film actor and director.
- Dorothy Shoemaker McDiarmid, 87, American politician, heart attack.
- Emil Seidler, 80, Austrian Olympic ice hockey player (1936).

=== 9 ===
- Dhirendra Brahmachari, 70, Indian spiritual leader and yoga instructor, plane crash.
- István Kocsis, 44, Hungarian football player, cancer.
- Lynn Harold Loomis, 79, American mathematician.
- David Reynoso, 68, Mexican actor, cancer.
- Jan Tinbergen, 91, Dutch economist and Nobel Prize laureate.

=== 10 ===
- Vic Bradford, 79, American Major League Baseball player (New York Giants).
- Jimmy Cameron, 70, Canadian cricket player.
- Mary Maxwell Gates, 64, American businesswoman and civic activist, breast cancer.
- Nils Holmer, 90, Swedish linguist.
- Edward Kienholz, 66, American installation artist and assemblage sculptor.
- Guillermo Pérez de Arce Plummer, 87, Chilean politician and entrepreneur.
- Noël Vantyghem, 46, Belgian cyclist.

=== 11 ===
- Herbert Anderson, 77, American actor, stroke.
- Richard Bartlett, 71, American director and producer in film and TV.
- Jerome W. Conn, 86, American endocrinologist.
- Jack Hannah, 81, American animator and writer and director of animated shorts, cancer.
- Harry New, 73, Australian rules footballer.
- Manolita Piña, 111, Spanish-Uruguayan artist and wife of Joaquín Torres García.
- Pietro Reggio, 72, Italian Olympic sailor (1952, 1960).
- Giovanni Turba, 88, Italian Olympic sprinter (1932).

=== 12 ===
- Christopher Collins, 44, American actor (G.I. Joe, Transformers, Inhumanoids) and stand-up comedian, stroke.
- Jack Howell, 69, Australian rules footballer.
- Menachem Mendel Schneerson, 92, Russian-American Orthodox rabbi
- Nicole Brown Simpson, 35, American murder victim and ex-wife of former American football player O. J. Simpson, stabbed.
- Ronald Goldman, 25, American murder victim, stabbed alongside Nicole Brown Simpson.
- William Elgin Swinton, 93, Scottish paleontologist.

=== 13 ===
- Anne Hopkins Aitken, 83, American Zen Buddhist, heart attack.
- Charles Alvin Beckwith, 65, American Special Forces officer.
- June Dayton, 70, American television actress.
- Enrique Fava, 74, Argentine actor.
- Nadia Gray, 70, Romanian film actress, cerebrovascular disease.
- Stasys Lozoraitis Jr., 69, Lithuanian diplomat and politician, kidney failure.
- Knud Olsen, 87, Danish Olympic rower (1928, 1932).
- James B. Pollack, 55, American astrophysicist, cancer.
- K. T. Stevens, 74, American actress, lung cancer.
- Igor Youskevitch, 82, Russian-Ukrainian ballet dancer and choreographer.

=== 14 ===
- Ismail Chirine, 74, Egyptian diplomat and army officer.
- Tom Fowler, 70, Canadian ice hockey player (Chicago Black Hawks).
- Lionel Grigson, 52, English jazz musician, writer and teacher.
- Emil Göing, 82, German Olympic basketball player (1936).
- John Hammond, 61, British Olympic bobsledder (1972).
- Denys Hay, 78, British historian.
- Francisco Isoldi, 70, Brazilian Olympic sailor (1952).
- Victor Jorgensen, 80, American photographer and photo journalist.
- Thomas Joseph Lane, 95, American politician, member of the United States House of Representatives (1941-1963).
- Stig Lindberg, 72, Swedish Olympic speed skater (1952).
- Henry Mancini, 70, American composer, conductor, pianist and flautist, pancreatic cancer.
- Marcel Mouloudji, 71, French singer and actor.
- Michel Vitold, 78, Russian-French stage and film actor.
- Lucien Vlaemynck, 79, Belgian road bicycle racer.
- Monte Weaver, 87, American baseball player (Washington Senators, Boston Red Sox).

=== 15 ===
- Clara Colosimo, 72, Italian film actress.
- William Goodsir-Cullen, 87, Indian field hockey player and Olympian (1928).
- Manos Hatzidakis, 68, Greek composer and theorist, pulmonary edema.
- Rich Johnson, 47, American basketball player.
- Jack Schwartzman, 61, American film producer (Never Say Never Again, Being There, I Am the Cheese), pancreatic cancer.

=== 16 ===
- Yohanan Bader, 92, Israeli politician and revisionist Zionist leader.
- Milton Busin, 67, Brazilian Olympic diver (1948, 1952).
- Len Butt, 83, English football player and manager.
- Chrix Dahl, 88, Norwegian painter and illustrator.
- Franjo Krajčar, 79, Yugoslavian Olympic long-distance runner (1952).
- Comte George Raphaël Béthenod de Montbressieux, 84, French-Argentine racing driver.
- Bernard Moitessier, 69, French sailor, prostate cancer.
- Kristen Pfaff, 27, American bassist and singer (Hole), drug overdose.
- Marlin Stuart, 75, American baseball player (Detroit Tigers, St. Louis Browns/Baltimore Orioles, New York Yankees).
- Eileen Way, 82, British actress.

=== 17 ===
- Boris Alexandrovich Alexandrov, 88, Soviet/Russian composer.
- Leonid Baykov, 74, Russian/Soviet painter.
- Kurt Hessenberg, 85, German composer and professor of art.
- Eigil Olaf Liane, 78, Norwegian politician.
- Edward McCullough, 85, Canadian politician, member of the House of Commons of Canada (1945-1949, 1953-1958).
- Martin Metzger, 68, Swiss cyclist.
- Yuri Nagibin, 74, Soviet/Russian writer, screenwriter and novelist.
- Branko Petranović, 66, Serbian historian.
- Charlie Shaw, 67, American football player (San Francisco 49ers).
- Len White, 64, English football player.
- Terence de Vere White, 82, Irish lawyer, writer and editor, Parkinson's disease.
- Frank Yates, 92, British statistician.

=== 18 ===
- Arturo Ruiz Castillo, 83, Spanish screenwriter and film director, stroke.
- Yekusiel Yehudah Halberstam, 89, Polish-American Orthodox rabbi and holocaust survivor.
- Margret Hofheinz-Döring, 84, German painter and graphic artist.
- Roger Lebel, 71, Canadian actor.

=== 19 ===
- Émilienne Demougeot, 84, French historian.
- Babatunde Elegbede, 55, Nigerian politician and admiral, homicide.
- Norm Honey, 80, Australian rules footballer.
- Tadeusz Kondrat, 86, Polish actor.
- Krešimir Račić, 61, Croatian hammer thrower and Olympian (1956, 1960).
- Bakri Siregar, 71, Indonesian socialist literary critic and writer.

=== 20 ===
- Robert Armbruster, 96, American composer, conductor, pianist and songwriter.
- John Farrell, 87, American Olympic speed skater (1928, 1932), and speed skating coach.
- Frank Filchock, 77, American gridiron football player (Pittsburgh Pirates, Washington Redskins, New York Giants) and coach (Denver Broncos).
- Einar Haugen, 88, American linguist, author, and professor.
- Don Macintosh, 62, Canadian Olympic basketball player (1956).
- Jay Miner, 62, American integrated circuit designer, kidney failure.
- Robin Raymond, 77, American film actress.
- Frederick William Rowe, 81, Canadian politician, member of the Senate of Canada (1971-1987).
- Vieno Simonen, 95, Finnish politician and farmer.
- Norm Wallen, 76, American baseball player (Boston Braves).

=== 21 ===
- Orien Crow, 81, American football player (Boston Redskins)
- Odd Harsheim, 69, Norwegian Olympic sailor (1956, 1960).
- Inger Lemvigh-Müller, 91, Danish Olympic equestrian (1956).
- Carlos Jiménez Mabarak, 78, Mexican composer.
- Winston Miller, 83, American screenwriter, film producer, and actor, heart attack.
- William Wilson Morgan, 88, American astronomer and astrophysicist.
- Walter Riml, 88, Austrian cameraman and actor.
- Wash Serini, 72, American football player (Chicago Bears, Green Bay Packers).

=== 22 ===
- Otto Bradfisch, 91, German SS-Obersturmbannführer and war criminal during World War II.
- Yitzhak Coren, 83, Israeli politician.
- Jack Davies, 80, English screenwriter, producer, editor and actor.
- Jorgjia Filçe-Truja, 87, Albanian soprano.
- Ilya Frez, 84, Soviet/Russian film director.
- Lisa Lindstrom, 81, American swimmer and Olympian (1928).
- Antonia Matos, 91, Guatemalan painter.
- L. V. Prasad, 86, Indian film producer, actor, director, and cinematographer.
- Julius Adams Stratton, 93, American electrical engineer.
- Xəlil Rza Ulutürk, 61, Azerbaijani poet.
- Eric Bransby Williams, 94, British actor.

=== 23 ===
- Joe Dobson, 77, American baseball player (Cleveland Indians, Boston Red Sox, Chicago White Sox).
- Robert T. Orr, 85, American biologist.
- Chang Shuhong, 90, Chinese painter.
- Antoni Sobik, 89, Polish Olympic fencer (1936, 1948).
- Marv Throneberry, 60, American Major League Baseball player, cancer.
- Kin Vassy, 50, American singer-songwriter, lung cancer.
- Dave Withers, 83, Australian rules footballer.

=== 24 ===
- James C. Adkins, 79, American judge.
- Gerald Burke, 63, Australian rules footballer.
- Len Einsaar, 81, Australian Olympic rower (1936).
- Thorstein Guthe, 82, Norwegian physician and Olympic fencer (1936).
- Bondoc Ionescu-Crum, 79, Romanian athlete, manager and Olympian (1936).
- Atila Kelemen, 75, Romanian Olympic water polo player (1952).
- Egon Knudsen, 79, Danish footballer.
- Leon MacLaren, 83, British philosopher and the founder of the School of Economic Science.
- Vijay Saxena, 26, Indian actor.
- Jean Vallerand, 78, Canadian musician and writer.
- Vecheslav Zagonek, 74, Soviet/Russian painter.

=== 25 ===
- Cecil Abel, 91, Papua New Guinean missionary, after an operation.
- James Philo Hagerstrom, 73, American fighter pilot and flying ace, stomach cancer.
- Pierre Leichtnam, 83, French Olympic middle-distance runner (1936).
- Haji Mastan, 68, Indian mafia gang leader, cardiac arrest.
- Matvey Shaposhnikov, 87, Soviet military commander.

=== 26 ===
- Jan-Erik Aarberg, 69, Norwegian Olympic sailor (1968, 1972).
- Thomas Armstrong, 96, English organist, conductor, composer and educationalist.
- Bobby Bonales, 77, Mexican professional wrestler.
- A. den Doolaard, 93, Dutch writer and journalist.
- Joseph Aloysius Durick, 79, American Roman Catholic bishop and civil rights advocate.
- Jahanara Imam, 65, Bangladeshi writer and political activist, cancer.

=== 27 ===
- Jacques Berthier, 71, French composer of liturgical music.
- Charles K. Duncan, 82, American Navy admiral, cancer.
- Sam Hanks, 79, American racecar driver.
- Louise Henderson, 92, New Zealand artist and painter.
- Alan Strange, 87, American baseball player (St. Louis Browns, Washington Senators), and manager.
- Larry Visnic, 75, American football player (New York Giants).

=== 28 ===
- Richard Bickenbach, 86, American animator.
- Russ Carroccio, 63, American football player (New York Giants, Philadelphia Eagles).
- Idel Ianchelevici, 85, Romanian-Belgian sculptor and draughtsman.
- Ulrik Neumann, 75, Danish film actor and musician.
- Giancarlo Sbragia, 68, Italian actor, stage director and playwright.
- Fredi Washington, 90, American actress, civil rights activist, and writer, stroke.

=== 29 ===
- Peter Blair, 62, American naval officer, wrestler and Olympian (1956).
- Kurt Eichhorn, 85, German conductor.
- Bob Masterson, 78, American gridiron football player (Washington Redskins).
- Ray Mueller, 82, American baseball player.
- Otis M. Smith, 72, American judge, Michigan Auditor General (1959–1961), Justice of the Michigan Supreme Court (1961–1966).
- Jack Unterweger, 43, Austrian serial killer, suicide.

=== 30 ===
- Georgie Abrams, 75, American boxer.
- Walter Chikowski, 78, Canadian football player.
- Halim Dener, 16, Kurdish murder victim.
- Jim Doran, 66, American gridiron football player (Detroit Lions, Dallas Cowboys).
- Don Kolloway, 75, American Major League Baseball player (Chicago White Sox, Detroit Tigers, Philadelphia Athletics).
- Dennis J. Roberts, 91, American politician
- Taro Yashima, 85, Japanese-American artist and children's author.

== Sources ==
- Carlin, Richard (2003) Country Music: A Biographical Dictionary, Taylor & Francis
- Sergei V. Ivanov. Unknown Socialist Realism. The Leningrad School. - Saint Petersburg: NP-Print Edition, 2007. – pp. 9, 18, 26, 29, 52, 230, 257, 261, 358, 388, 390-400, 402-405, 413, 415, 416, 418-422. ISBN 5-901724-21-6, ISBN 978-5-901724-21-7.
