= Athletics at the 1948 Summer Olympics – Men's marathon =

Men's marathon at the Games of the XIV Olympiad
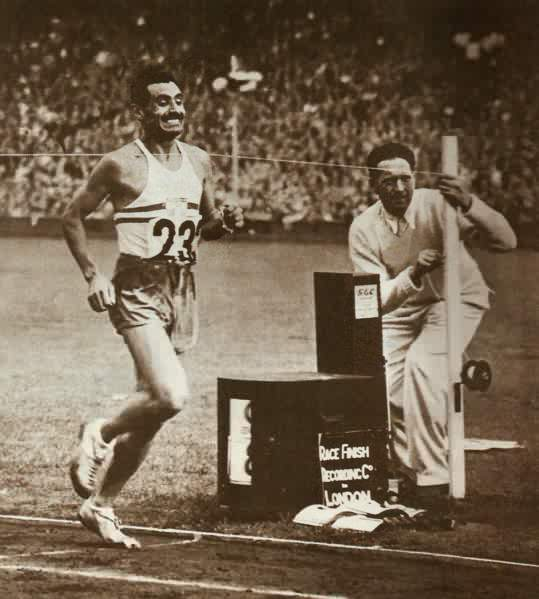
- Delfo Cabrera crossing the finish line
- Venue: Start and finish at Wembley Stadium
- Dates: August 7, 1948
- Competitors: 41 from 21 nations
- Winning time: 2:34:51.6

Medalists
1st place, gold medalist(s)		Delfo Cabrera; Argentina
2nd place, silver medalist(s)		Tom Richards; Great Britain
3rd place, bronze medalist(s)		Étienne Gailly; Belgium

Official Video Highlights

The men's marathon event at the 1948 Summer Olympic Games took place on August 7. Forty-one athletes from 21 nations competed. The maximum number of athletes per nation had been set at 3 since the 1930 Olympic Congress. The race was won by Delfo Cabrera of Argentina, the nation's second victory in three Games (though the victories were 16 years apart). Tom Richards's silver medal put Great Britain on the podium for the third time in a row, while Étienne Gailly earned Belgium's first marathon medal with his bronze.

Reminiscent of Dorando Pietri's final-lap ordeal when the Olympics were held in the same city 40 years earlier, Gailly entered the London stadium in first place, but was exhausted and running very slowly. He was passed first by Cabrera, then by Richards, but managed to hold on for the bronze medal. South African Johannes Coleman, who finished 4th in this race, had placed 6th in the last Olympic marathon in Berlin twelve years earlier.

== Background ==
This was the 11th appearance of the event, which is one of 12 athletics events to have been held at every Summer Olympics. Returning runners from the pre-war 1936 marathon included sixth-place finisher Johannes Coleman of South Africa. There was no clear favorite, though Viljo Heino (world record holder in the 10,000 metres) "was considered someone to watch" as he made his marathon debut.

Ireland, South Korea, and Turkey each made their first appearance in Olympic marathons. The United States made its 11th appearance, the only nation to have competed in each Olympic marathon to that point.

== Competition format and course ==
As all Olympic marathons, the competition was a single race. The 1908 course (the first Olympic marathon at the now-standard marathon distance of 26 miles, 385 yards) was not used. Instead, a course was designed that "started and finished at Wembley Stadium, looping thru the London suburbs."

== Records ==
These were the standing world and Olympic records prior to the 1948 Summer Olympics.

World record	Suh Yun-bok (KOR)	2:25:39	Boston, United States	19 April 1947
Olympic record	Sohn Kee-chung (JPN)	2:29:19.2	Berlin, Germany	9 August 1936

No new world or Olympic bests were set during the competition.

== Schedule ==
All times are British Summer Time (UTC+1)

Date	Time	Round
Saturday, 7 August 1948	15:00	Final

== Results ==
Rank	Athlete	Nation	Time
1st place, gold medalist(s)	Delfo Cabrera	Argentina	2:34:51.6
2nd place, silver medalist(s)	Tom Richards	Great Britain	2:35:07.6
3rd place, bronze medalist(s)	Étienne Gailly	Belgium	2:35:33.6
4	Johannes Coleman	South Africa	2:36:06.0
5	Eusebio Guiñez	Argentina	2:36:36.0
6	Syd Luyt	South Africa	2:38:11.0
7	Gustav Östling	Sweden	2:38:40.6
8	John Systad	Norway	2:38:41.0
9	Armando Sensini	Argentina	2:39:30.0
10	Henning Larsen	Denmark	2:41:22.0
11	Viljo Heino	Finland	2:41:32.0
12	Anders Melin	Sweden	2:42:20.0
13	Jussi Kurikkala	Finland	2:42:48.0
14	Ted Vogel	United States	2:45:27.0
15	Enrique Inostroza	Chile	2:47:48.0
16	Lloyd Evans	Canada	2:48:07.0
17	Gérard Côté	Canada	2:48:31.0
18	Stylianos Kyriakides	Greece	2:49:00.0
19	József Kiss	Hungary	2:50:20.0
20	Şevki Koru	Turkey	2:51:07.0
21	Johnny Kelley	United States	2:51:56.0
22	Kaspar Schiesser	Switzerland	2:52:09.0
23	Walter Fedorick	Canada	2:52:12.0
24	Ollie Manninen	United States	2:56:49.0
25	Hong Jong-o	South Korea	2:56:54.0
26	Paddy Mulvihill	Ireland	2:57:35.0
27	Suh Yun-bok	South Korea	2:59:36.0
28	Sven Håkansson	Sweden	3:00:09.0
29	Jakob Jutz	Switzerland	3:03:55.0
30	Stan Jones	Great Britain	3:09:16.0
—	Salvatore Costantino	Italy	DNF
—	Pierre Cousin	France	DNF
—	Hans Frischknecht	Switzerland	DNF
—	Mikko Hietanen	Finland	DNF
—	Jack Holden	Great Britain	DNF
—	René Josset	France	DNF
—	Lou Wen-ngau	Republic of China	DNF
—	Arsène Piesset	France	DNF
—	Athanasios Ragazos	Greece	DNF
—	Chhota Singh	India	DNF
—	Choi Yun-chil	South Korea	DNF
—	José María Blay	Spain	DNS
—	Charles Heirendt	Luxembourg	DNS
—	István Simon	Hungary	DNS
