= 1950 European Athletics Championships – Men's marathon =

Men's marathon at the European Athletics Championships

The men's marathon at the 1950 European Athletics Championships was held in Brussels, Belgium, on 23 August 1950.

== Medalists ==
Gold	Jack Holden; Great Britain
Silver	Veikko Karvonen; Finland
Bronze	Feodosiy Vanin; Soviet Union

== Results ==
=== Final ===
23 August

Rank	Name	Nationality	Time	Notes
1st place, gold medalist(s)	Jack Holden	Great Britain	2:32:14	CR
2nd place, silver medalist(s)	Veikko Karvonen	Finland	2:32:45	
3rd place, bronze medalist(s)	Feodosiy Vanin	Soviet Union	2:33:47	
4	Gösta Leandersson	Sweden	2:34:26	
5	Vasiliy Gordiyenko	Soviet Union	2:34:37	
6	Charles Cérou	France	2:36:09	
7	Jean Leblond	Belgium	2:36:55	
8	Étienne Gailly	Belgium	2:38:24	
9	John Systad	Norway	2:39:50	
10	Gustav Östling	Sweden	2:41:18	
11	Edward Denison	Great Britain	2:44:31	
12	Vilho Partanen	Finland	2:45:26	
13	Miroslav Glogonjac	Yugoslavia	2:55:41	
14	Luka Bosanac	Yugoslavia	2:59:05	
15	Alfons Zwicker	Switzerland	3:01:04	
16	Adri Moons	Netherlands	3:01:50	
17	Athanasios Ragazos	Greece	3:01:52	
18	Behzat Akdeniz	Turkey	NT	
19	Gottfried Knecht	Switzerland	NT	
	René Josset	France	DNF	
	Joop Overdyk	Netherlands	DNF	
	Ludwig Jahn	Austria	DNF	

== Participation ==
According to an unofficial count, 22 athletes from 13 countries participated in the event.

- Austria (1)
- Belgium (2)
- Finland (2)
- France (2)
- Greece (1)
- Netherlands (2)
- Norway (1)
- Soviet Union (2)
- Sweden (2)
- Switzerland (2)
- Turkey (1)
- Great Britain (2)
- Yugoslavia (2)
