= 1946 European Athletics Championships – Men's marathon =

Men's marathon at the European Athletics Championships

The men's marathon at the 1946 European Athletics Championships was held in Oslo, Norway, on 22 August 1946.

== Medalists ==
Gold	Mikko Hietanen; Finland
Silver	Väinö Muinonen; Finland
Bronze	Yakov Punko; Soviet Union

== Results ==
It is reported that the event was held on a short course measuring only 40.1 kilometres. Therefore, the winning time is no new championship record.

=== Final ===
22 August

Rank	Name	Nationality	Time	Notes
1st place, gold medalist(s)	Mikko Hietanen	Finland	2:24:55	
2nd place, silver medalist(s)	Väinö Muinonen	Finland	2:26:08	
3rd place, bronze medalist(s)	Yakov Punko	Soviet Union	2:26:21	
4	Pierre Cousin	France	2:27:05	
5	Gösta Leandersson	Sweden	2:28:30	
6	Erik Jonsson	Sweden	2:30:08	
7	Squire Yarrow	Great Britain	2:30:40	
8	Henning Larsen	Denmark	2:32:50	
9	Athanasios Ragazos	Greece	2:32:58	
10	Kaspar Schiesser	Switzerland	2:36:42	
11	Václav Weisshäutel	Czechoslovakia	2:37:07	
12	John Systad	Norway	2:42:59	
13	Robert Nevens	Belgium	2:50:23	
14	Antonín Špiroch	Czechoslovakia	2:57:44	
	Horace Oliver	Great Britain	DNF	
	Øivind Gundhu	Norway	DNF	
	Stylianos Kiriakidis	Greece	DNF	

== Participation ==
According to an unofficial count, 17 athletes from 11 countries participated in the event.

- Belgium (1)
- Czechoslovakia (2)
- Denmark (1)
- Finland (2)
- France (1)
- Greece (2)
- Norway (2)
- Soviet Union (1)
- Sweden (2)
- Switzerland (1)
- Great Britain (2)
