= Deaths in September 2002 =

The following is a list of notable deaths in September 2002.

Entries for each day are listed alphabetically by surname. A typical entry lists information in the following sequence:

- Name, age, country of citizenship at birth, subsequent country of citizenship (if applicable), reason for notability, cause of death (if known), and reference.

== September 2002 ==
=== 1 ===
- Yuji Ichioka, 66, American historian and civil rights activist, cancer.
- B. V. Karanth, 72, Indian actor and director.
- Turk Van Lake, 84, American arranger, composer and jazz guitarist.
- Arthur Shannos, 64, Australian weightlifter and Olympian (1960, 1964).
- Rodney Taylor, 62, Australian Navy officer, lung cancer.

=== 2 ===
- Geoff Bennett, 75, Australian Olympic field hockey player (1956).
- Leon Campbell, 75, American gridiron football player (University of Arkansas, Chicago Bears, Pittsburgh Steelers).
- Abe Lemons, 79, American college basketball player and coach, complications from Parkinson's disease.
- Ken Menke, 79, American basketball player.
- Rodica Ojog-Brașoveanu, 63, Romanian writer, severe lung problems.
- Ahmad Rahi, 78, Pakistani poet and writer.
- F.X. Toole, 72, American boxing trainer and short story writers.
- Robert Wilson, 75, British astrophysicist, known for his research in optical and solar plasma spectroscopy.

=== 3 ===
- Floyd Collier, 78, American football player (San Francisco 49ers).
- Dirk ter Haar, 83, Anglo-Dutch physicist.
- Kenneth Hare, 83, Canadian scientist.
- Ted Ross, 68, American actor (The Wiz, Arthur, Police Academy).
- Mercedes Sibanda, 36, Zimbabwean footballer (Highlanders, national team).
- William Clement Stone, 100, American businessman, philanthropist and self-help book author.
- Len Wilkinson, 85, British cricketer.
- Eugene Allen Wright, 89, American circuit judge (United States Court of Appeals for the Ninth Circuit).

=== 4 ===
- Frankie Albert, 82, American professional football player (Stanford, San Francisco 49ers), Alzheimer's disease.
- Dave Baker, 65, American professional football player (University of Oklahoma, San Francisco 49ers).
- Jerome Biffle, 74, American Olympic long jumper (gold medalist 1952), pulmonary fibrosis.
- Jim Constable, 69, American baseball player (New York/San Francisco Giants, Cleveland Indians, Washington Senators, Milwaukee Braves).
- Andrew Forge, 78, American painter, art critic and professor of painting at Yale University.
- Vlado Perlemuter, 98, Lithuanian-French pianist and teacher.
- Fozia Soomro, 36, Pakistani regional folk singer, kidney failure.

=== 5 ===
- K. T. Achaya, 78, Indian oil and food scientist and writer.
- Robert W. Brooks, 49, American mathematics professor, known for his work in spectral geometry and fractals.
- William Cooper, 92, English novelist.
- Cliff Gorman, 65, American actor (The Boys in the Band, All That Jazz, Ghost Dog: The Way of the Samurai), Tony winner (1972), leukemia.
- Frank Hewitt, 66, American hard bop jazz pianist.
- James Iremonger, 84, British Olympic bobsledder (1948).
- Jackie Kelk, 79, American actor and stand-up comedian, lung infection.
- Amon Nikoi, 72, Ghanaian economist and diplomat.
- Ingeborg Taschner, 72, German film editor.
- David Todd Wilkinson, 67, American cosmologist, known for thermal cosmic background radiation, cancer.

=== 6 ===
- Michael Argyle, 77, British psychologist, a pioneer of social psychology in Britain.
- Roxy Atkins, 90, Canadian hurdler and Olympian (1936).
- Gabriel Camps, 75, French archaeologist and social anthropologist.
- Bobby Clancy, 75, Irish singer and musician, pulmonary fibrosis.
- Rafael Druian, 79, American violinist and conductor (New York Philharmonic, Cleveland Orchestra).
- Orvan Hess, 96, American physician.
- Géza Hollósi, 64, Hungarian Olympic wrestler (1960, 1964, 1968).
- Philip LaBatte, 91, American Olympic ice hockey player (1936).
- Martin Matsbo, 90, Swedish cross-country skier and Olympic medalist (1936).
- Janet Young, Baroness Young, 75, British politician (Leader of the House of Lords), cancer.

=== 7 ===
- Katrin Cartlidge, 41, English actress (Brookside, Before the Rain, Breaking the Waves), complications from pneumonia and sepsis.
- Jonathan Charney, 59, American academic, author, and lawyer.
- Eugenio Coșeriu, 81, linguist specialized in Romance languages.
- Gene Donaldson, 59, American and Canadian football player (Buffalo Bills).
- Michael Elphick, 55, English actor (Boon, EastEnders, Gorky Park, Private Schulz), heart attack.
- Cyrinda Foxe, 50, American actress, model and publicist, brain cancer.
- John Paul Frank, 84, American lawyer and scholar, helped shape U.S. Supreme Court cases (Brown v. Board of Education, Miranda v. Arizona).
- Erma Franklin, 64, American gospel and soul singer ("Piece of My Heart"), older sister of Aretha Franklin, laryngeal cancer.
- Uziel Gal, 78, German-Israeli firearm designer who invented the Uzi submachine gun, cancer.
- Arcadie Sarcadi, 77, Romanian Olympic water polo player (1952).
- Don Smith, 73, Canadian ice hockey player (New York Rangers).
- Edward Spotovich, 86, American football and basketball player.
- Doyle Tackett, 79, American football player (Brooklyn Dodgers).

=== 8 ===
- Mireia Casas, 33, Spanish Olympic windsurfer (1992, 1996).
- Georges-André Chevallaz, 87, Swiss historian and politician.
- Rulon Jeffs, 92, American polygamist and religious leader.
- Lucas Moreira Neves, 76, Brazilian Roman Catholic prelate.
- Henri Rol-Tanguy, 94, French communist and a leader in the Resistance during World War II.
- Marco Siffredi, 23, French snowboarder (last seen on this date).
- Laurie Williams, 33, West Indian cricketer, car accident.

=== 9 ===
- Tom Bradley, 76, British politician (member of Parliament representing Leicester North East and Leicester East).
- Geoffrey Dummer, 92, English electronics engineer, built the first prototype of the integrated circuit.
- Gerald W. Johnson, 83, US Air Force lieutenant general and flying ace during World War II.
- Graham Kennedy, 63, New Zealand rugby league footballer.
- José Luis Massera, 87, Uruguayan mathematician.
- Ali As-Suwaisy, 75, Egyptian Quran reciter

=== 10 ===
- Augusto Lamo Castillo, 63, Spanish football referee.
- René Cousineau, 72, Canadian politician (member of Parliament representing Gatineau, Quebec).
- Sandor Elès, 66, Hungarian actor.
- Alexander Farrelly, 78, American politician, governor of the United States Virgin Islands from 1987 to 1995.
- David Grene, 89, Irish-American professor of classics.
- Zoltán Kávay, 71, Hungarian rower and Olympian (1956).
- Kuo Pao Kun, 63, Chinese playwright, theatre director, and arts activist, kidney and liver cancer.
- Žarana Papić, 53, Serbian social anthropologist and feminist theorist.
- T. Viswanathan, 75, Indian musician specializing in the carnatic flute and voice.

=== 11 ===
- Bruce Howard, 79, Canadian politician, member of the House of Commons of Canada (1968-1972).
- Kim Hunter, 79, American actress (A Streetcar Named Desire, Planet of the Apes, The Edge of Night), Oscar winner (1952), heart attack.
- Howard Levi, 85, American mathematician.
- Leonardo Marquicias, 71, Filipino basketball player and Olympian (1956).
- Howard T. Odum, 78, American ecologist.
- Johnny Unitas, 69, American gridiron football player and a member of the Pro Football Hall of Fame (Baltimore Colts, San Diego Chargers), cardiovascular renal disease.
- Martin Urra, 71, Filipino basketball player and Olympian (1956).
- David Wisniewski, 49, American writer and illustrator of children's books.

=== 12 ===
- Lloyd Biggle, Jr., 79, American musician and author, leukemia and cancer.
- Mitsuo Ikeda, 67, Japanese freestyle wrestler and Olympic gold medalist (1956).
- Sheikh Mohammad Rashid, 87, Pakistani politician.
- Neil Shields, 83, British politician and businessman.

=== 13 ===
- Sir Douglas Black, 89, British physician, played a key role in the development of the National Health Service.
- Richard Foster, 83, American modernist architect.
- George Hills, 84, British journalist and historian.
- Alexander Kazantsev, 96, Soviet and Russian science fiction writer, ufologist and chess composer.
- Charles Herbert Lowe, 82, American biologist.
- William Phillips, 94, American editor, writer and public intellectual.
- Brooks Richards, 84, British diplomat and SOE operative.
- Blanca de Silos, 88, Spanish film actress.
- George Stanley, 95, Canadian historian and public servant.

=== 14 ===
- Jim "Bad News" Barnes, 61, American basketball player (Los Angeles Lakers, Boston Celtics), and Olympian (1964), heart problems.
- Frederic Bennett, 83, British journalist, barrister politician (member of Parliament for Torbay, Torquay and Reading North).
- Roberto Cavanagh, 87, Argentine Olympic polo player (1936).
- Michael Greer, 64, American actor, comedian and cabaret performer, cancer.
- Jim McKee, 55, American baseball player (Pittsburgh Pirates), traffic collision.
- LaWanda Page, 81, American actress (Sanford and Son), diabetes.
- Geoffrey Picard, 59, American Olympic rower (1964).
- Eddie Shokes, 82, American baseball player (Cincinnati Reds).
- Lolita Torres, 72, Argentine film actress and soprano.
- Paul Williams, 87, African American jazz and blues saxophonist, bandleader, and songwriter ("The Huckle-Buck").

=== 15 ===
- Ibrahim Awariki, 74, Lebanese Olympic wrestler (1960).
- Kay Espenhayn, 34, German paralympic swimmer, complications to lung, kidney and heart disease.
- Jenny Maakal, 89, South African freestyle swimmer and Olympic medalist (1932).
- George Maina, 28, Kenyan Olympic boxer (1996).
- James Mitchell, 76, British writer, principally of crime fiction and spy thrillers.
- Jean Rousset, 92, Swiss literary critic.

=== 16 ===
- James Gregory, 90, American actor (Barney Miller, The Manchurian Candidate, The Lawless Years).
- Archibald Hall, 78, British criminal known as the "Killer Butler", stroke.
- Jiří Javorský, 70, Czech tennis player.
- Thomas Roberts McMillen, 86, American district judge (United States District Court for the Northern District of Illinois).
- Raymond Reiter, 63, Canadian computer scientist and logician.
- Mary Stott, 95, British journalist and feminist.
- Nguyen Van Thuan, 74, Vietnamese Roman Catholic prelate, cancer.
- Jean Vernette, 73, French Roman Catholic prelate and researcher of cults.

=== 17 ===
- Eileen Colwell, 98, British author and librarian.
- Jack Ferguson, 78, Australian politician (Deputy Premier of New South Wales), mesothelioma.
- Denys Fisher, 84, British inventor of the Spirograph.
- Edward Kocząb, 74, Polish ice hockey player and Olympian (1956).
- James Macdonald, 83, Scottish-Australian ornithologist.
- Dodo Marmarosa, 76, American jazz pianist, composer, and arranger.
- Govind Perumal, 76, Indian field hockey player and Olympic champion (1952, 1956).
- Frederick Robertson, 93, Canadian politician, member of the House of Commons of Canada (1949-1957).
- Edvaldo Alves de Santa Rosa, 68, Brazilian football player and manager, cancer.

=== 18 ===
- Hazel Brooks, 78, American actress.
- Mike Brunson, 55, American football player (Atlanta Falcons).
- Andreas Burnier, 71, Dutch writer who focussed on homosexuality, transsexuality and discrimination, intracranial hemorrhage.
- Boris Carmi, 88, Russian-Israeli photographer.
- Herbert Allan Fogel, 73, American district judge (United States District Court for the Eastern District of Pennsylvania).
- Bob Hayes, 59, American football player (Dallas Cowboys), member of the Pro Football Hall of Fame, and Olympic sprinter (1964), prostate cancer.
- Ned Mathews, 84, American football player (Detroit Lions, Boston Yanks, San Francisco 49ers).
- Mauro Ramos, 72, Brazilian football player, intestinal cancer.
- Shivaji Sawant, 62, Indian novelist in the Marathi language.
- Herbert Schmidt, 88, German rower and Olympic medalist (1936).
- Margita Stefanović, 43, Serbian musician, complications from HIV.

=== 19 ===
- Albert Ando, 72, Japanese-American economist, leukemia.
- John Arundel, 74, Canadian ice hockey player (Toronto Maple Leafs).
- Robert Guéï, 61, Ivorian politician and its military ruler (1999-2000), murdered along with his family.
- Duncan Hallas, 76, British communist politician and Marxist theorist.
- Ian Hutchinson, 54, English football player.
- Swede Johnston, 92, American football player (Green Bay Packers, Chicago Cardinals, Pittsburgh Pirates/Steelers).
- Francisco Lojacono, 66, Italian Argentine football player and manager.
- Pétur Sigurðsson, 74, Icelandic Olympic sprinter (1952).
- Priya Tendulkar, 47, Indian actress, social activist and writer, heart attack.
- Carl W. Thompson, 88, American lawyer and Democratic politician.
- Tatyana Velikanova, 70, Soviet dissident and mathematician.

=== 20 ===
- Les Auge, 49, American professional ice hockey player (Colorado Rockies).
- Sergey Bodrov, Jr., 30, Russian movie star, Kolka-Karmadon rock ice slide, accidental death.
- Vittorio Bolla, 70, Italian Olympic ice hockey player (1956, 1964).
- Bruce Edwards, 90, American actor and photographer.
- Necdet Kent, 91, Turkish diplomat and humanitarian.
- Eduardo Gudiño Kieffer, 66, Argentine writer.
- Joan Littlewood, 87, English theatre director.
- Francisco Monteiro, 76, Hong Kong Olympic swimmer (1952).
- Pat Saward, 74, English football player, Alzheimer's disease.
- Irmgard Schmelzer, 81, German Olympic long jumper (1952).
- Bob Wallace, 53, American computer scientist, helped invent "shareware" software marketing.

=== 21 ===
- Henry Pybus Bell-Irving, 89, Canadian World War II commander and Lieutenant Governor of British Columbia.
- Angelo Buono, 67, American serial killer, kidnapper and rapist (the "Hillside Strangler"), heart attack.
- Robert L. Forward, 70, American physicist and science fiction author, founded Tethers Unlimited to manufacture tethers for NASA.
- Peter Kowald, 58, German free jazz double bassist and tubist, heart attack.
- Stuart Leggatt, 70, Canadian politician and judge.
- Maurice Manson, 89, Canadian actor.
- Rocco Rock, 49, American professional wrestler, heart attack.
- William Schuette, 68, American Olympic canoeist (1952, 1956).
- Robert White, 81, American sculptor, professor and poet.

=== 22 ===
- André Antunes, 79, Portuguese Olympic sports shooter (1960, 1972).
- Don Carlsen, 75, American baseball player (Chicago Cubs, Pittsburgh Pirates).
- Jan de Hartog, 88, Dutch-American novelist and playwright.
- Anthony Lancelot Dias, 92, Indian politician.
- Harry Glancy, 98, American competition swimmer and Olympic champion (1924).
- Antonio Haro, 91, Mexican Olympic épée and sabre fencer (1932, 1936, 1948, 1952).
- Pierre Jacquinot, 92, French physicist.
- Joseph Nathan Kane, 103, American historian and author.
- Anthony Milner, 77, British musician, multiple sclerosis.
- Marga Petersen, 83, German athlete and Olympian (1952).
- Julio Pérez, 76, Uruguayan football player.
- William Rosenberg, 86, American entrepreneur, bladder cancer.
- Anel Sudakevich, 95, Soviet silent film actress.

=== 23 ===
- James Scarlett, 8th Baron Abinger, 87, British peer.
- Vernon Corea, 75, Sri Lankan-born British radio broadcaster.
- George Georges, 82, Australian politician.
- Eduard Gufeld, 66, Soviet/Russian International Grandmaster of chess and chess author, heart attack.
- Erich Oberdorfer, 97, German biologist specializing in phytosociology and phytogeography.
- John Wu, 77, Hong Kong Roman Catholic cardinal, diabetes.

=== 24 ===
- Hobbs Adams, 99, American football player and coach (USC, Kansas State).
- Tetsuya Ayukawa, 83, Japanese literary critic and novelist.
- Sergio Bergonzelli, 78, Italian director, screenwriter, producer and actor.
- Robert Anthony Buell, 62, American serial killer, child murderer and serial rapist, execution by lethal injection.
- Leon Hart, 73, American football player and Heisman recipient (Notre Dame Fighting Irish, Detroit Lions).
- Tim Rose, 62, American singer and songwriter, heart attack.
- Ludwig Warnemünde, 85, German Olympic long-distancer runner (1952).
- Mike Webster, 50, American football player (Pittsburgh Steelers) and a member of the Pro Football Hall of Fame, heart attack.

=== 25 ===
- Bailey Aldrich, 95, American judge.
- Jacques Borel, 76, French author.
- Ray Hayworth, 98, American baseball player (Detroit Tigers, Brooklyn Dodgers, New York Giants, St. Louis Browns).
- Wesley Liebeler, 71, American law professor, plane crash.
- Roman Pucinski, 83, American Democratic politician.
- Arnold Ross, 96, American mathematician.
- Naeem Siddiqui, 86, Pakistani Islamic scholar, writer and politician.

=== 26 ===
- Enzo Andronico, 78, Italian actor and comedian.
- Eleonore Bjartveit, 78, Norwegian politician.
- Nils Bohlin, 82, Swedish mechanical engineer, invented the three-point car safety belt.
- Ricardo Calvo, 58, Spanish chess master and historian and author on chess, esophageal cancer.
- Kenny Griffin, 90, American Olympic gymnast (1936).
- Alex Kvasnak, 81, American baseball player (Washington Senators).
- Henry Larsen, 86, Danish Olympic rower (1948).
- Thomas Sidney Smith, 84, American politician, member of the New Jersey General Assembly.
- Philippe Tailliez, 97, French diving pioneer, underwater photographer and colleague of Jacques Cousteau.

=== 27 ===
- Lidia Chmielnicka-Żmuda, 63, Polish volleyball player and Olympian (1968).
- Wally Dreyer, 79, American gridiron football player (Chicago Bears, Green Bay Packers) and college football coach.
- Charles Henri Ford, 94, American poet, novelist, and filmmaker.
- David Granger, 99, American Olympic bobsledder (1928), and businessman.
- Attila Keresztes, 74, Hungarian-American fencer and Olympic champion (1956, 1964).
- Per Axel Lundgren, 91, Swedish art director.
- Ed Mills, 80, American basketball player.
- Anna Murià, 98, Spanish Catalan narrator, literary critic, and journalist.
- Bill Pearson, 80, New Zealand writer.
- Glen Rounds, 96, American author and illustrator.
- Svend Aage Sørensen, 76, Danish Olympic boxer (1948).

=== 28 ===
- Alicia Barrié, 86, Chilean actress.
- Whitney Blake, 76, American actress (Hazel), director and producer (One Day at a Time), esophageal cancer.
- John Cannady, 79, American gridiron football player (Indiana University, New York Giants).
- Patsy Mink, 74, American lawyer and politician, viral pneumonia.
- Hartland Molson, 95, Canadian statesman, senator and businessman.
- Maurice Novarina, 95, French architect.

=== 29 ===
- Bob Cobbing, 82, British poet.
- Zvi Kolitz, 89, Lithuanian-American writer and film and theatrical producer.
- Ine ter Laak-Spijk, 71, Dutch Olympic middle-distance runner (1960).
- Ellis Larkins, 79, American jazz pianist, pneumonia.
- Mickey Newbury, 62, American songwriter and recording artist, emphysema.
- Harry Street, 75, English rugby league footballer.
- Giuliana Tesoro, 81, American organic chemist.

=== 30 ===
- Robert Battersby, 77, British businessman and politician, member of the European Parliament.
- Len Casanova, 97, American college football coach (Santa Clara Broncos, Pittsburgh Panthers, Oregon Ducks).
- Ron Duhamel, 64, Canadian politician (member of Parliament representing Saint Boniface, Manitoba, Senator for Manitoba).
- Göran Kropp, 35, Swedish adventurer and mountaineer, fall.
- Miloš Macourek, 75, Czech poet, playwright, author and screenwriter.
- Germana Malabarba, 88, Italian gymnast and Olympic medalist (1928).
- Eddie McGah, 81, American baseball player (Boston Red Sox).
- Meinhard Michael Moser, 78, Swiss mycologist, heart attack.
- Ewart Oakeshott, 86, British illustrator.
- Hans-Peter Tschudi, 88, Swiss politician and minister.
