= Athletics at the 1952 Summer Olympics – Men's marathon =

Men's marathon at the Games of the XV Olympiad
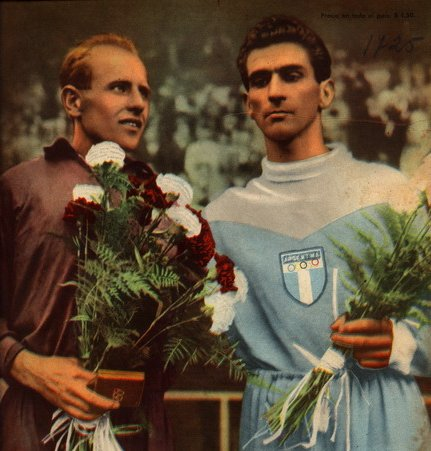
- Zátopek and Gorno
- Venue: Helsinki Olympic Stadium, Helsinki
- Dates: July 27, 1952
- Competitors: 66 from 32 nations
- Winning time: 2:23:03.2 OR

Medalists
| 1st place, gold medalist(s) | | Emil Zátopek; Czechoslovakia |
| 2nd place, silver medalist(s) | | Reinaldo Gorno; Argentina |
| 3rd place, bronze medalist(s) | | Gustaf Jansson; Sweden |

The marathon at the 1952 Summer Olympics was held on 27 July on a course running from the Helsinki Olympic Stadium to Korso, Helsinki Rural Municipality (now Vantaa) and back. Sixty-six athletes from 32 nations competed. The maximum number of athletes per nation had been set at three since the 1930 Olympic Congress. The winning margin was 2 minutes 31.8 seconds.

The event was won by Emil Zátopek of Czechoslovakia, the nation's first Olympic marathon medal. Zátopek completed a long distance triple that has never been matched: the 5,000 metres, 10,000 metres, and marathon golds in a single Games. Reinaldo Gorno's silver medal put Argentina on the marathon podium for the second straight Games, and the third of the four times Argentina had competed. Sweden took its first marathon medal since 1900, as Gustaf Jansson matched the nation's best result to date in the event. Great Britain's three-Games marathon medal streak ended.

Official Video

Approximately halfway through the race, Zátopek famously pulled alongside pre-race favorite Jim Peters and asked him, "Jim, is this pace too fast?" Peters replied, "No, it isn't fast enough." Peters later said he was joking, but Zátopek accelerated into the lead and won by more than two and a half minutes. Peters failed to finish.

== Background ==
This was the 12th appearance of the event, which is one of 12 athletics events to have been held at every Summer Olympics. Returning runners from the 1948 marathon included defending champion Delfo Cabrera of Argentina and sixth- through eighth-place finishers Syd Luyt of South Africa, Gustav Östling of Sweden, and John Systad of Norway. The favorite was Jim Peters of Great Britain, the 1951 and 1952 Polytechnic Marathon winner who had broken the world record at the 1952 race. Emil Zátopek of Czechoslovakia had never run a marathon before, but had won the 5000 metres and 10000 metres earlier in the Games and decided to enter the marathon.

Egypt, Guatemala, Pakistan, and the Soviet Union each made their first appearance in Olympic marathons. The United States made its 12th appearance, the only nation to have competed in each Olympic marathon to that point.

== Competition format and course ==
As all Olympic marathons, the competition was a single race. The marathon distance of 26 miles, 385 yards was run over a "straight out-and-back course, starting and finishing at the Olympic Stadium" and going to Korso. The full length of the road was hard-surfaced.

== Records ==
These were the standing world and Olympic records prior to the 1952 Summer Olympics.

| World record | Jim Peters (GBR) | 2:20:42 | Shepherd's Bush, England | 14 June 1952 |
| Olympic record | Sohn Kee-chung (JPN) | 2:29:19.2 | Berlin, Germany | 9 August 1936 |

Emil Zátopek set a new Olympic best at 2:23:03.2.

== Schedule ==
The day was "fairly cool."

All times are Eastern European Summer Time (UTC+3)

| Date | Time | Round |
|---|---|---|
| Sunday, 27 July 1952 | 15:25 | Final |

== Results ==
| Rank | Athlete | Nation | Time | Notes |
|---|---|---|---|---|
| 1st place, gold medalist(s) | Emil Zátopek | Czechoslovakia | 2:23:03.2 | OR |
| 2nd place, silver medalist(s) | Reinaldo Gorno | Argentina | 2:25:35.0 | |
| 3rd place, bronze medalist(s) | Gustaf Jansson | Sweden | 2:26:07.0 | |
| 4 | Choi Yun-Chil | South Korea | 2:26:36.0 | |
| 5 | Veikko Karvonen | Finland | 2:26:41.8 | |
| 6 | Delfo Cabrera | Argentina | 2:26:42.4 | |
| 7 | József Dobronyi | Hungary | 2:28:04.8 | |
| 8 | Erkki Puolakka | Finland | 2:29:35.0 | |
| 9 | Geoffrey Iden | Great Britain | 2:30:42.0 | |
| 10 | Wally Hayward | South Africa | 2:31:50.2 | |
| 11 | Syd Luyt | South Africa | 2:32:41.0 | |
| 12 | Gustaf Östling | Sweden | 2:32:48.4 | |
| 13 | Victor Dyrgall | United States | 2:32:52.4 | |
| 14 | Luis Celedón | Chile | 2:33:45.8 | |
| 15 | Adrien van de Zande | Netherlands | 2:33:50.0 | |
| 16 | Viktor Olsen | Norway | 2:33:58.4 | |
| 17 | Mikko Hietanen | Finland | 2:34:01.0 | |
| 18 | Charles Dewachtere | Belgium | 2:34:32.0 | |
| 19 | Bill Keith | South Africa | 2:34:38.0 | |
| 20 | Yakov Moskachenkov | Soviet Union | 2:34:43.8 | |
| 21 | Mihály Esztergomi | Hungary | 2:35:10.0 | |
| 22 | Doroteo Flores | Guatemala | 2:35:40.0 | |
| 23 | Jean Simonet | Belgium | 2:35:43.0 | |
| 24 | Jakob Kjersem | Norway | 2:36:14.0 | |
| 25 | Katsuo Nishida | Japan | 2:36:19.0 | |
| 26 | Keizo Yamada | Japan | 2:38:11.2 | |
| 27 | Feodosy Vanin | Soviet Union | 2:38:22.0 | |
| 28 | Grigory Suchkov | Soviet Union | 2:38:28.8 | |
| 29 | Henry Norrström | Sweden | 2:38:57.4 | |
| 30 | Dieter Engelhardt | Germany | 2:39:37.2 | |
| 31 | Cristea Dinu | Romania | 2:39:42.2 | |
| 32 | Jean Leblond | Belgium | 2:40:37.0 | |
| 33 | Choi Chung-Sik | South Korea | 2:41:23.0 | |
| 34 | John Systad | Norway | 2:41:29.8 | |
| 35 | Jaroslav Šourek | Czechoslovakia | 2:41:40.4 | |
| 36 | Tom Jones | United States | 2:42:50.0 | |
| 37 | Robert Prentice | Australia | 2:43:13.4 | |
| 38 | Muhammad Havlidar Aslam | Pakistan | 2:43:38.2 | |
| 39 | Adolf Gruber | Austria | 2:45:02.0 | |
| 40 | Paul Collins | Canada | 2:45:58.0 | |
| 41 | Vasile Teodosiu | Romania | 2:46:00.8 | |
| 42 | Erik Simonsen | Denmark | 2:46:41.4 | |
| 43 | Ludwig Warnemünde | Germany | 2:50:00.0 | |
| 44 | Ted Corbitt | United States | 2:51:09.0 | |
| 45 | Claude Smeal | Australia | 2:52:23.0 | |
| 46 | Asfò Bussotti | Italy | 2:52:55.0 | |
| 47 | Winand Osiński | Poland | 2:54:38.2 | |
| 48 | Olaf Sørensen | Denmark | 2:55:21.0 | |
| 49 | Joseph West | Ireland | 2:56:22.8 | |
| 50 | Rudolf Morgenthaler | Switzerland | 2:56:33.0 | |
| 51 | Abdelgani Abdel Fattah | Egypt | 2:56:56.0 | |
| 52 | Surat Mathur | India | 2:58:09.2 | |
| 53 | Artidoro Berti | Italy | 2:58:36.2 | |
| — | Ahmet Aytar | Turkey | DNF | |
| — | Franjo Krajčar | Yugoslavia | DNF | |
| — | Hong Jong-O | South Korea | DNF | |
| — | Muhammad Ben Aras | Pakistan | DNF | |
| — | Lionel Billas | France | DNF | |
| — | Constantin Radu | Romania | DNF | |
| — | Corsino Fernández | Argentina | DNF | |
| — | Raúl Inostroza | Chile | DNF | |
| — | Luis Velásquez | Guatemala | DNF | |
| — | Stan Cox | Great Britain | DNF | |
| — | Jim Peters | Great Britain | DNF | |
| — | Egilberto Martufi | Italy | DNF | |
| — | Yoshitaka Uchikawa | Japan | DNF | |
| — | Hans Frischknecht | Switzerland | DNS | |
| — | Les Perry | Australia | DNS | |
