= Sensini =

Sensini is a surname. Notable people with the surname include:

- Alessandra Sensini (born 1970), Italian windsurfer
- Armando Sensini (1909–1970), Argentine marathon runner in the 1948 Olympics
- Kristian Sensini (born 1976), Italian film composer
- Roberto Sensini (born 1966), Argentine football manager and former player
