= Dieter Engelhardt =

Dieter Engelhardt may refer to:

- Dieter Engelhardt (athlete) (born 1926), German long-distance runner
- Dieter Engelhardt (footballer) (1938–2018), German football player
