= Stan Jones (athlete) =

British long-distance runner

Personal information
- Nationality: British (English)
- Born: 26 December 1914 Cricklewood, Greater London, England
- Died: 18 May 2006 (aged 91) Windsor, England

Sport
- Sport: Athletics
- Event: Long-distance running
- Club: Polytechnic Harriers

Stanley Francis Jones (26 December 1914 – 18 May 2006) was a British long-distance runner who competed at the 1948 Summer Olympics.

== Biography ==
Jones ran in an era when British marathon runners were competing with the world's best and he was denied much national success by Jack Holden and Tom Richards. In 1946, Jones finsished fourth at the AAA Championships and second in the Polytechnic Marathon.

At the 1948 AAA Championships, Jones finished third behind Holden and Richards in the marathon event.

Shortly after the AAAs, Jones represented the Great Britain team at the 1948 Olympic Games in London. He competed in the marathon event, finishing 30th.

Jones was a stockbroker by trade and continued running marathons even after he had given up serious compeitition.
