= Viktor Olsen =

Norwegian long-distance runner (1924–2023)

Viktor Olaf Olsen (5 February 1924 – 21 April 2023) was a Norwegian long-distance runner who specialized in the marathon race. He finished sixteenth at the 1952 Summer Olympics, ninth at the 1954 European Championships and finally eighteenth at the 1958 European Championships.

Olsen became Norwegian marathon champion in 1954, 1956, 1957, 1958 and 1959, breaking a four-year dominance of John Systad. He also won a bronze medal in 1950 as well as silver medals in 1951, 1952, 1953, 1955, 1960 and 1961. He also dominated the 25 kilometre road race in the 1950s, winning a bronze in 1949 and 1950; silver in 1958 and gold in 1953, 1954, 1955, 1956 and 1957. He represented the club Charlottenlund SK in Trondheim. His personal best time was 2:28:50 hours, achieved in August 1958 in Trondheim.

Olsen died on 21 April 2023, at the age of 99.
