= Charles Dewachtere =

Belgian long-distance runner (1927–2020)

Personal information
- Full name: Charles Paul Dewachtere
- Nationality: Belgian
- Born: 22 December 1927 Ghent, Belgium
- Died: 22 July 2020 (aged 92) Ghent, Belgium

Sport
- Sport: Long-distance running
- Event: Marathon

Charles Paul Dewachtere (22 December 1927 – 22 July 2020) was a Belgian long-distance runner. He competed in the marathon at the 1952 Summer Olympics. Dewachtere became twice Belgian champion.

In 1951 he became Belgian champion in a race over 35 km, between Waregem and Ghent. In 1952, the Belgian championship was held over the official marathon distance as qualification race for the 1952 Summer Olympics in Helsinki. Helped by the high pace of Jean Leblond, Dewachtere won the Belgian championship in a very fast time. Only two Englishmen ran a faster marathon at that time. Dewachtere was therefore one of the main favorites for the Games. However, due to a heel bone injury, he finished 18th. Winner Emil Zátopek was only four seconds faster than Dewachtere's time at the Belgian championships.

After the 1952 Summer Olympics, Dewachtere was unemployed. He got into an altercation soon after the games, for which he was sentenced to thirty months in prison, effectively ending his sporting career. He died on July 22, 2020, at the age of 92.
