= Constantin Radu =

Constantin Radu may refer to:

- Constantin Radu (athlete), Romanian long-distance runner
- Constantin Radu (footballer) (1945–2020), Romanian footballer
- Constantin Radu (rower) (born 1996), Romanian rower
