= Yakov Moskachenkov =

Soviet long-distance runner

Personal information
- Nationality: Soviet
- Born: 17 August 1916
- Died: 1992 (aged 75–76)

Sport
- Sport: Long-distance running
- Event: Marathon

Yakov Moskachenkov (7 August 1916 – 1992) was a Soviet long-distance runner. He competed in the marathon at the 1952 Summer Olympics.
