= Gustaf Jansson =

Swedish long-distance runner

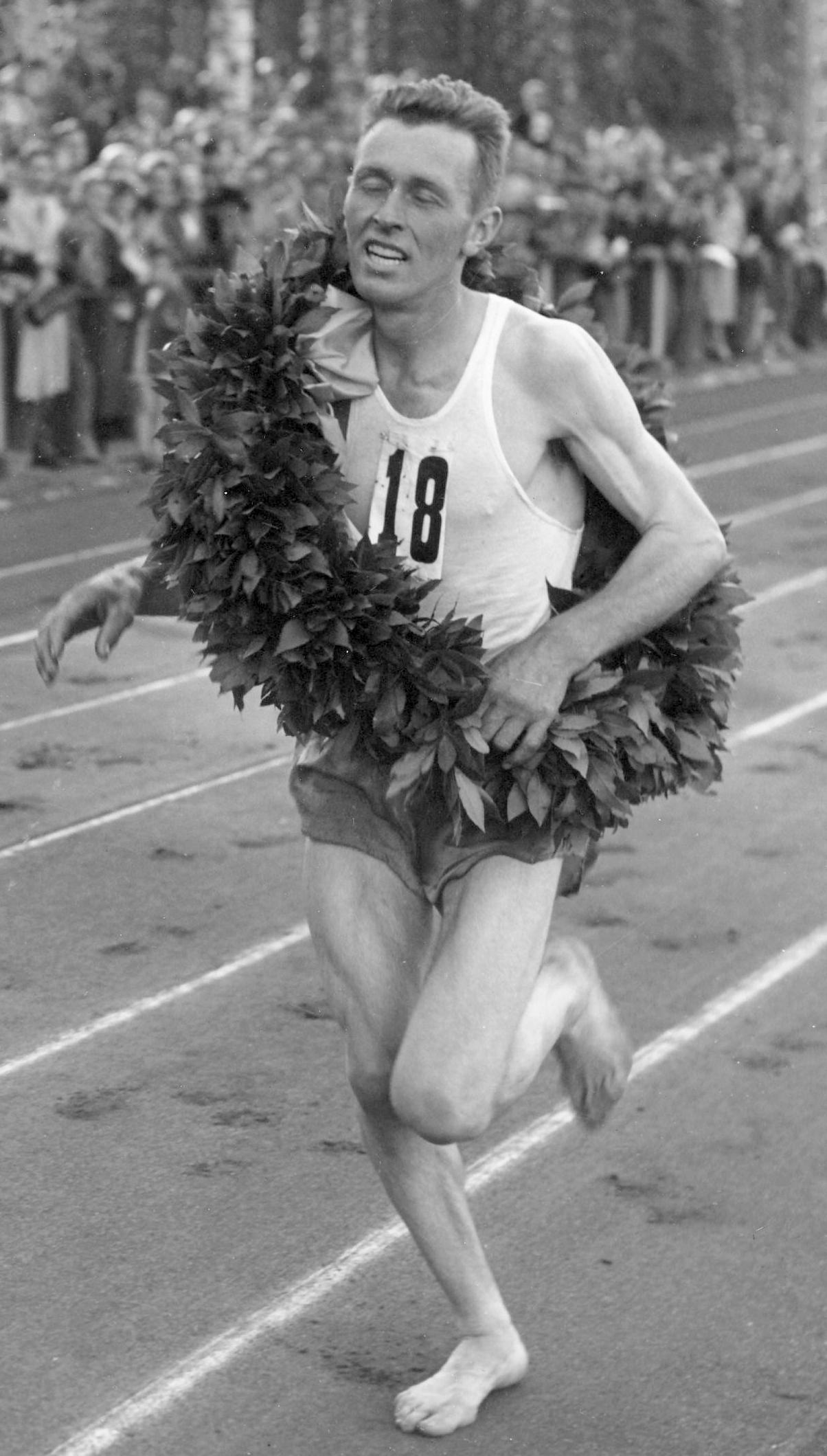

Personal information
- Born: 5 January 1922 Brattfors, Sweden
- Died: 11 April 2012 (aged 90) Karlstad, Sweden
- Height: 1.78 m (5 ft 10 in)
- Weight: 67 kg (148 lb)

Sport
- Sport: Athletics
- Events: Marathon, 10000 m
- Club: IK Viking, Hagfors

Achievements and titles
- Personal bests: 10000 m – 29:51.2 (1952); Mar – 2:21:40 (1955)
Medal record
Representing Sweden
Olympic Games
Bronze medal – third place	1952 Helsinki	Marathon

Gustaf Nils Jansson (5 January 1922 – 11 April 2012) was a Swedish long-distance runner who won the bronze medal in the marathon at the 1952 Summer Olympics. He finished fifth at the 1954 European Athletics Championships.
