= Athanasios Ragazos =

Greek long-distance runner

Personal information
- Nationality: Greek
- Born: 15 August 1913 Almyros, Greece
- Died: March 30, 1993 (aged 79)
- Height: 1.68 m (5 ft 6 in)

Sport
- Sport: Long-distance running
- Event: Marathon
- Club: GS Almyriou

Athanasios Ragazos (Greek: Αθανάσιος Ραγάζος; 15 August 1913 – 30 March 1993) was a Greek long-distance runner.

Before the Second World War, Ragazos won four Balkan Championships titles in the 10,000 metres and the marathon race in 1938, 1939 and 1940. After the war he finished ninth at the 1946 European Championships, seventeenth at the 1950 European Championships won the silver medal at the 1951 Mediterranean Games, all in the marathon. He also competed in the marathon at the 1948 Summer Olympics without finishing the race.

His personal best time in the marathon race was 2:35.27 hours, achieved in 1951.
