= Étienne Gailly =

Belgian soldier and Olympic athlete

Medal record

Men's athletics

Representing Belgium

Olympic Games
Bronze medal – third place	1948 London	Marathon

Étienne Gailly (French pronunciation: [etjɛn ɡaji]; 26 November 1922, Beringen – 3 November 1971, Genval) was a Belgian soldier and Olympic athlete who competed mainly in the Marathon.

== Career ==
Étienne Gailly was a Belgian who served as a paratrooper during World War II. Towards the end of the War, as he participated in the liberation of his home country in late 1944, Gailly was profoundly moved by the devastation to his home. He vowed that he would win an Olympic gold medal or drop trying.

He was a club runner, wearing the colors of London's Belgrave Harriers. After the war he continued running. His results after the war were moderately good but not threatening to the world leaders. In 1948, he was not rated as a serious contender for the Olympic marathon, held in London.

In his first full marathon run, in very hot conditions Gailly took the race out hard. Inexperienced at this distance, and underestimating the dehydrating effect of the severe and unusual heat and humidity, he opened up a lead of over half a minute at the course midpoint. On two occasions he beat back challenges, first from Korean Choi and then from Argentinian Cabrera. It seemed he might win, although by this point his lead was dwindling and his pace was slowing.

However, nearing the stadium and the finish, he suddenly ran out of gas. As he faded, Gailly was reeled in by Delfo Cabrera (ARG) and Tom Richards (GBR). Entering the stadium in the lead but stumbling with exhaustion, the crowd roaring encouragement, he was passed by Cabrera during the final lap. He fell and was then passed by Richards. Despite falling again, he dragged himself half-standing over the line. He finished third to a standing ovation. Cabrera finished in 2:34:51.6, Richards in 2:35.07.6, and Gailly in 2:35.33.6.

Gailly was unable to attend the victory ceremony because his efforts put him in hospital.

Gailly contested the 1950 European Championship marathon, but his subsequent career was cut short by an injury sustained during service in the Korean War. During the Battle of Haktang-ni, Gailly stepped on a trip-flare sustaining a minor wound.

== Other ==
Both Étienne and his brother Pierre served during the Korean War as part of the Belgian United Nations Command. Pierre Gailly was killed in action, Étienne seriously wounded.
