= Asfò Bussotti =

Italian long-distance runner

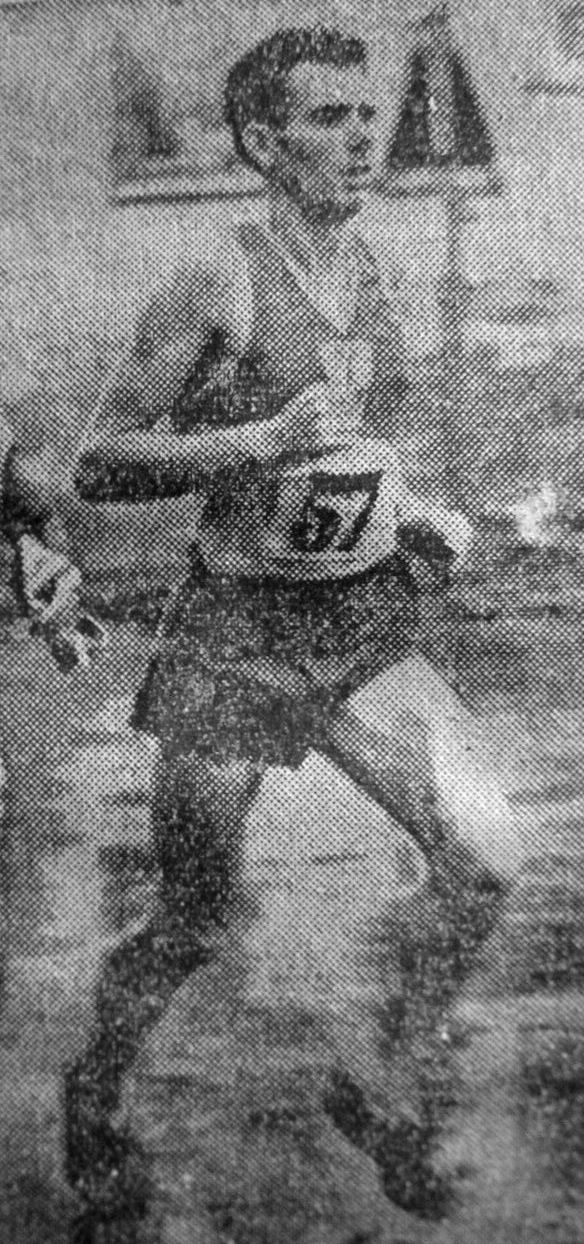
- Asfò Bussotti at the 1952 Olympic games in Helsinki

Personal information
- Nationality: Italian
- Born: 2 December 1925 Florence, Italy
- Died: 24 December 1987 (aged 62) Florence, Italy

Sport
- Sport: Athletics
- Event: Long-distance running
- Club: Giglio Rosso

Asfò Bussotti (2 December 1925 – 24 December 1987) was an Italian long-distance runner. He competed in the marathon at the 1952 Summer Olympics.
