= Joseph West (athlete) =

Irish long-distance runner

Personal information
- Nationality: Irish
- Born: 6 January 1921 Cork, Ireland
- Died: 26 June 2000 (aged 79)

Sport
- Sport: Long-distance running
- Event: Marathon

Joseph West (6 January 1921 – 26 June 2000) was an Irish long-distance runner. He competed in the marathon at the 1952 Summer Olympics in Helsinki, Finland.
