= Lloyd Evans (athlete) =

Canadian long-distance runner (1915–2002)

Personal information
- Born: 31 July 1915 Montreal, Quebec, Canada
- Died: 29 July 2002 (aged 86) Calgary, Alberta, Canada

Sport
- Sport: Long-distance running
- Event: Marathon

Lloyd George Evans (31 July 1915 – 29 July 2002) was a Canadian long-distance runner. He competed in the men's marathon at the 1948 Summer Olympics, placing 16th with a time of 2 hours, 48 minutes and 7 seconds. His personal best time for the men's marathon was 2 hours, 39 minutes and 41 seconds in 1947.
