= Feodosy Vanin =

Soviet long-distance runner

Personal information
- Nationality: Soviet
- Born: 25 February 1914 Baturinsky, Russian Empire
- Died: 26 December 2009 (aged 95)

Sport
- Sport: long-distance running
- Event: Marathon

Achievements and titles
- Olympic finals: 1952 Summer Olympics
Medal record
Men's athletics
Representing Soviet Union
European Championships
Bronze medal – third place	1950 Brussels	Marathon

Feodosy Vanin (25 February 1914 – 26 December 2009) was a Soviet long-distance runner. He competed in the marathon at the 1952 Summer Olympics.
