= Anders Melin =

Swedish long-distance runner

Personal information
- Nationality: Swedish
- Born: 31 July 1921 Sundsvall, Sweden
- Died: 5 June 2001 (aged 79) Sundsvall, Sweden

Sport
- Sport: Long-distance running
- Event: Marathon

Anders Melin (31 July 1921 – 5 June 2001) was a Swedish long-distance runner. He competed in the marathon at the 1948 Summer Olympics.
