= Lionel Billas =

French long-distance runner

Personal information
- Nationality: French
- Born: 3 February 1929 Commercy, France
- Died: 17 July 1995 (aged 66)

Sport
- Sport: Long-distance running
- Event: Marathon

Lionel Billas (3 February 1929 – 17 July 1995) was a French long-distance runner. He competed in the marathon at the 1952 Summer Olympics.
