= Grigory Suchkov =

Soviet athlete

Personal information
- Nationality: Soviet
- Born: 1917 Tula, Imperial Russia
- Died: 1979 (aged 61–62)

Sport
- Sport: Long-distance running
- Event: Marathon

Grigory Suchkov (1917–1979) was a Soviet long-distance runner. He competed in the marathon at the 1952 Summer Olympics.
