= Muhammad Ben Aras =

Pakistani long-distance runner

Personal information
- Nationality: Pakistani
- Born: 13 September 1930

Sport
- Sport: Long-distance running
- Event: Marathon

Muhammad Ben Aras (born 13 September 1930) is a Pakistani long-distance runner. He competed in the marathon at the 1952 Summer Olympics.
