= Luis Celedón =

Chilean long-distance runner

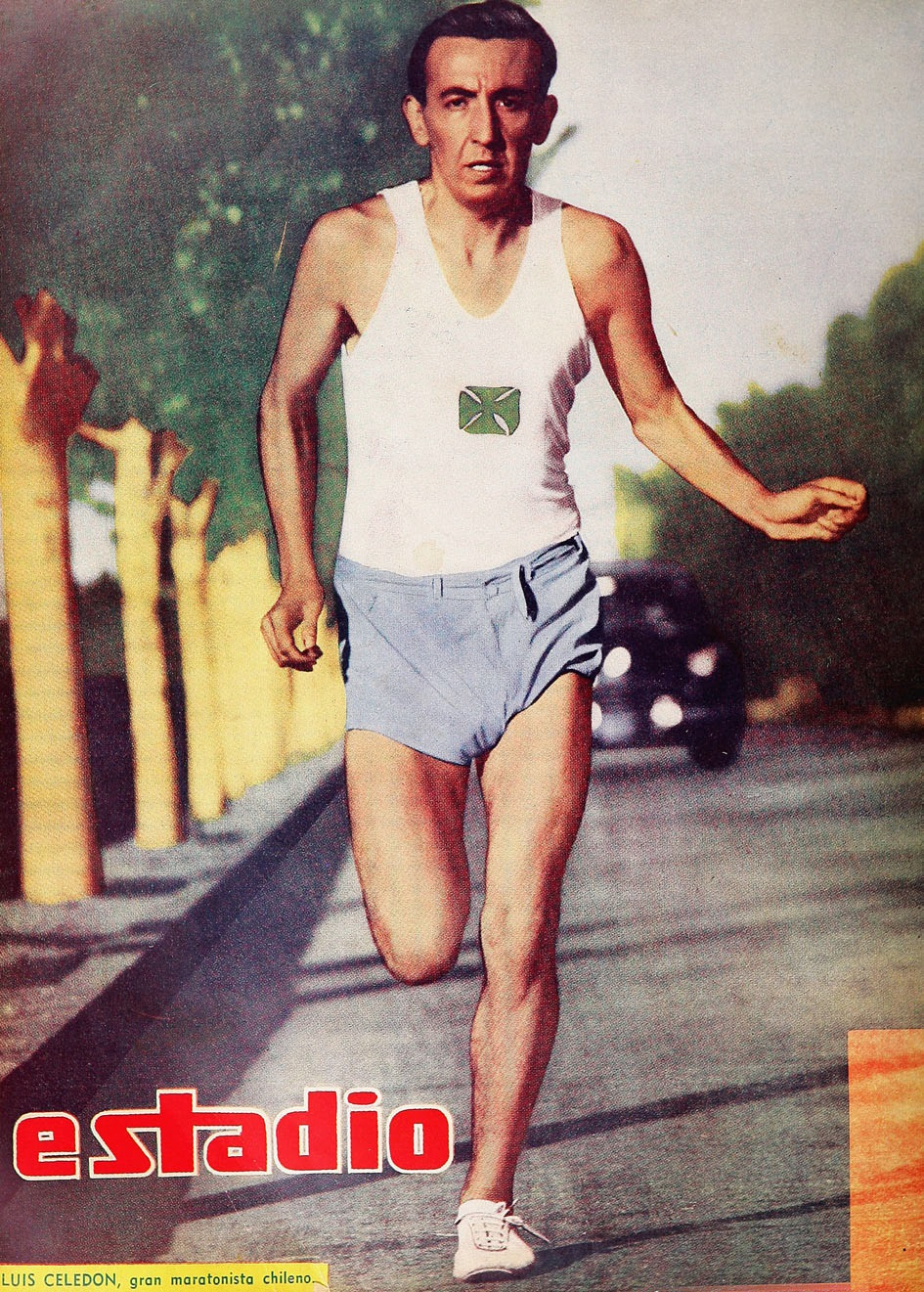

Personal information
- Full name: Ramón Luis Celedón Nilo
- Born: 16 December 1926 Los Andes, Chile

Sport
- Sport: Long-distance running
- Event: Marathon

Luis Celedón (born 16 December 1926) was a Chilean long-distance runner. He competed in the marathon at the 1952 Summer Olympics.

== International competitions ==
Year	Competition	Venue	Position	Event	Notes
Representing Chile
1952	South American Championships	Buenos Aires, Argentina	–	Half marathon	NT
1952	Olympic Games	Helsinki, Finland	14th	Marathon	2:33:46

== Personal bests ==
- Marathon – 2:33:46 (Helsinki 1952)
