= Yoshitaka Uchikawa =

Japanese athlete

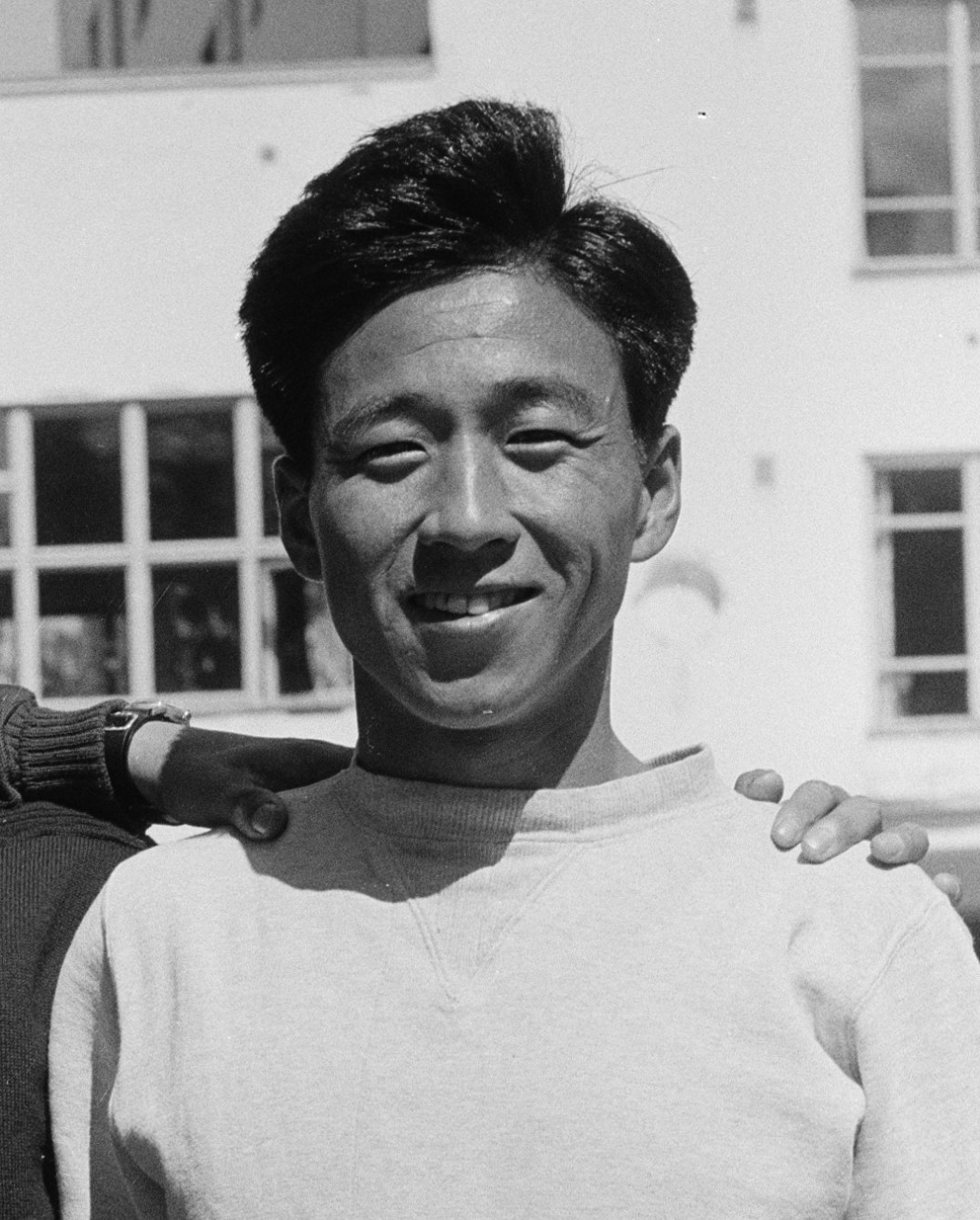
- Yoshitaka Uchikawa in 1952

Personal information
- Nationality: Japanese
- Born: 4 April 1931

Sport
- Sport: Long-distance running
- Event: Marathon

Yoshitaka Uchikawa (内川 義高, Uchikawa Yoshitaka; born 4 April 1931) is a Japanese long-distance runner. He competed in the marathon at the 1952 Summer Olympics.
