= Winand Osiński =

Polish long-distance runner

Personal information
- Nationality: Polish
- Born: 22 August 1913 Gladbeck, Germany
- Died: 11 April 2006 (aged 92) Sławkowo, Poland
- Height: 1.76 m (5 ft 9 in)
- Weight: 75 kg (165 lb)

Sport
- Sport: Long-distance running
- Event: Marathon
- Club: Sokół Bydgoszcz (1935–1936); Polonia Warsaw (1937–1938); Warszawianka Warsaw (1939); HKS Bydgoszcz (1946–1948); Darzbór–Unia Szczecinek (1948–1956)

Winand Osiński (22 August 1913 – 11 April 2006) was a Polish long-distance runner. He competed in the marathon at the 1952 Summer Olympics.

== International competitions ==
| Year | Competition | Venue | Position | Event | Notes |
Representing Poland
| 1952 | Olympic Games | Helsinki, Finland | 47th | Marathon | 2:54:38.2 |

== Personal bests ==
- 3000 metres – 9:24.0h (Warsaw 1938)
- 5000 metres – 15:52.5h (Warsaw 1938)
- 10,000 metres – 34:03.4h (Wrocław 1952)
- Marathon – 2:43:06.0h (Elbląg 1951)
- 3000 metres steeplechase – 10:50.6h (Kraków 1938)
