= Henry Norrström =

Swedish long-distance runner

Personal information
- Nationality: Swedish
- Born: 28 January 1918 Gävle, Sweden
- Died: 14 May 1996 (aged 78) Gävle, Sweden

Sport
- Sport: Long-distance running
- Event: Marathon

Henry Norrström (28 January 1918 – 14 May 1996) was a Swedish long-distance runner. He competed in the marathon at the 1952 Summer Olympics.
