= Vasile Teodosiu =

Romanian long-distance runner

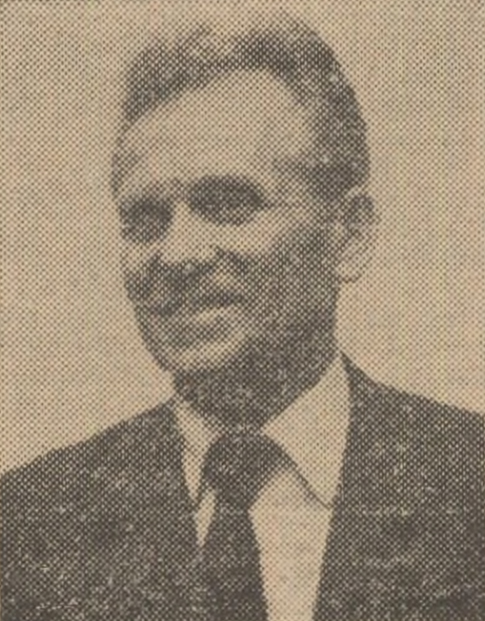
- Teodosiu in 1976

Personal information
- Nationality: Romanian
- Born: 21 December 1916 Bucharest, Kingdom of Romania
- Died: 12 April 1989 (aged 72)

Sport
- Sport: Long-distance running
- Event: Marathon

Vasile Teodosiu (21 December 1916 – 12 April 1989) was a Romanian long-distance runner. He competed in the marathon at the 1952 Summer Olympics.
