= Rudolf Morgenthaler =

Swiss long-distance runner

Personal information
- Nationality: Swiss
- Born: 22 March 1926 Wyssachen, Bern, Switzerland
- Died: 25 September 2014 (aged 88)

Sport
- Sport: Long-distance running
- Event: Marathon

Rudolf Morgenthaler (22 March 1926 – 25 September 2014) was a Swiss long-distance runner. He competed in the marathon at the 1952 Summer Olympics.
