= Claude Smeal =

Australian long-distance runner

Personal information
- Nationality: Australian
- Born: 22 September 1918 Waverley, New South Wales, Australia
- Died: 1 January 1993 (aged 74) Nords Wharf, New South Wales, Australia

Sport
- Sport: Long-distance running
- Event: Marathon

Claude Smeal (22 September 1918 – 1 January 1993) was an Australian long-distance runner. He competed in the marathon at the 1952 Summer Olympics."
