= Abdelgani Abdel Fattah =

Egyptian long-distance runner

Personal information
- Nationality: Egyptian
- Born: 23 October 1920

Sport
- Sport: Long-distance running
- Event: Marathon

Abdelgani Abdel Fattah (born 23 October 1920) was an Egyptian long-distance runner. He competed in the marathon at the 1952 Summer Olympics.
