= Olaf Sørensen (athlete) =

Danish long-distance runner

Personal information
- Nationality: Danish
- Born: 30 November 1917 Aarhus, Denmark
- Died: 25 May 2008 (aged 90) Aarhus, Denmark

Sport
- Sport: Long-distance running
- Event: Marathon

Olaf Sørensen (30 November 1917 – 25 May 2008) was a Danish long-distance runner. He competed in the marathon at the 1952 Summer Olympics.
