= Mikko Hietanen =

Finnish long-distance runner

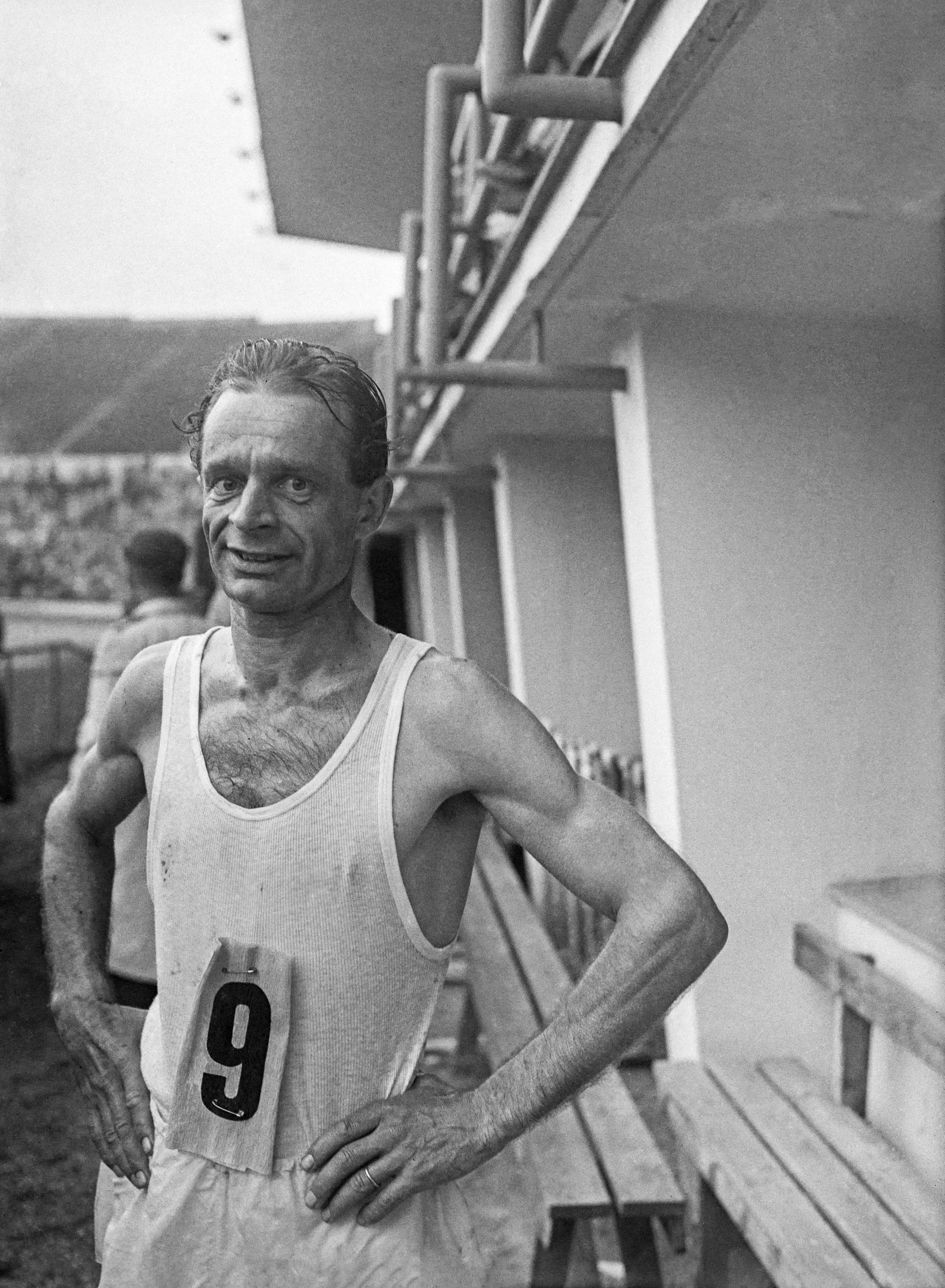
- 1952

Personal information
- Full name: Mikko Hietanen
- Nationality: Finnish
- Born: 22 September 1911 Uusikirkko, Karelia
- Died: 3 February 1999 (aged 87) Laukaa, Central Finland
- Height: 1.67 m (5 ft 6 in)
- Weight: 54 kg (119 lb; 8.5 st)

Sport
- Sport: Running
- Event: Marathon
- Club: Uudenkylän Terävä; Kouvolan Urheilijat; Johanneksen Kireät; Pölläkkälän Ura; Lahden Ahkera; Vihtavuoren Pamaus
Medal record
Men's athletics
Representing Finland
European Championships
Gold medal – first place	1946 Oslo	Marathon

Mikko Hietanen (September 22, 1911 – February 3, 1999) was a Finnish long-distance runner, European Champion and world record holder, who competed for his native country at the Summer Olympics in London 1948 and in Helsinki 1952.

== Biography ==
Mikko Hietanen was born in Uusikirkko, Karelia, 22 September 1911. He died in Laukaa, Central Finland, 3 February 1999.

== Career ==
Hietanen is best known for winning the gold medal in the men's marathon at the 1946 European Championships in Oslo, Norway.

In Oslo 1946, the marathon race took place on 22 August, which was the first day of the championships. At the same time, the final of the 10000 meter race was being held. As Viljo Heino of Finland was running towards victory in the 10000 meters, his fellow countryman Mikko Hietanen entered Bislett Stadium as leader of the marathon. Inside the stadium, the marathon runners were running clockwise to the finish line using the outside lane. It so happened, that Heino and Hietanen met each other on the track as they were both running towards victory.

In the marathon, Mikko Hietanen had the fastest time in the world in 1946, 1947 and 1948. During his career, he set six new world records at distances between 15 miles and 30000 meters.

Mikko Hietanen was not very successful in the Olympic Games. He took part in the marathon in London 1948, but did not finish the race due to promblems with his Achilles tendon. Four years later, on home soil in Helsinki, he finished in 17th place.

Hietanen became Finnish champion in marathon four years in a row between 1945 and 1948.

== Achievements ==
=== Games ===
Year	Competition	Venue	Position	Event	Notes
Representing Finland
1946	European Championships	Oslo, Norway	1st	Marathon	2:24:55
1946	Košice Peace Marathon	Košice, Czechoslovakia	1st	Marathon	2:35:02
1947	Boston Marathon	Boston, United States	2nd	Marathon	2:29:39
1948	Olympic Games	London, United Kingdom	—	Marathon	DNF
1952	Olympic Games	Helsinki, Finland	17th	Marathon	2:34:01.0

=== World records ===
- 25,000 m world record with 1:20.58,8 in Vuoksenniska, 17 June 1946
- 25,000 m world record with 1:20.14,0 in Kokkola, 23 May 1948
- 30,000 m world record with 1:40.49,8 in Jyväskylä, 28 September 1947
- 30,000 m world record with 1:40.46,4 in Jyväskylä, 20 June 1948
- 15 miles world record with 1:17.28,6 in Kokkola, 23 May 1948
- 20 miles world record with 1:49.20,8 in Jyväskylä, 20 June 1948
