= Jean Simonet =

Belgian long-distance runner

Personal information
- Nationality: Belgian
- Born: 5 May 1927 Tubize, Belgium
- Died: 17 March 2022 (aged 94)

Sport
- Sport: Long-distance running
- Event: Marathon

Jean Simonet (5 May 1927 – 17 March 2022) was a Belgian long-distance runner. He competed in the marathon at the 1952 Summer Olympics.
