= Şevki Koru =

Turkish long-distance runner

Personal information
- Nationality: Turkish
- Born: 1 April 1913
- Died: 27 September 2003 (aged 90)

Sport
- Sport: Long-distance running
- Event: Marathon

Şevki Koru (1 April 1913 – 27 September 2003) was a Turkish long-distance runner. He competed in the marathon at the 1948 Summer Olympics.
