= Egilberto Martufi =

Italian long-distance runner (1926–1989)

Personal information
- Nationality: Italian
- Born: 5 May 1926 Rome, Italy
- Died: 1989 (aged 62–63)

Sport
- Sport: Long-distance running
- Event: Marathon

Egilberto Martufi (5 May 1926 – 1989) was an Italian long-distance runner. He competed in the marathon at the 1952 Summer Olympics.
