= Mihály Esztergomi =

Hungarian long-distance runner

Personal information
- Nationality: Hungarian
- Born: 13 June 1912 Csolnok, Austria-Hungary
- Died: 25 November 1993 (aged 81) Budapest, Hungary

Sport
- Sport: Long-distance running
- Event: Marathon

Mihály Esztergomi (13 June 1912 – 25 November 1993) was a Hungarian long-distance runner. He competed in the marathon at the 1952 Summer Olympics.
