= Lou Wen-ngau =

Chinese long-distance runner (1919–1960s)

Personal information
- Nationality: Chinese
- Born: 1919 Shanghai, China
- Died: 1960s

Sport
- Sport: Long-distance running
- Event: Marathon

Lou Wen-ngau (Chinese: 樓文敖; pinyin: Lóu Wén'áo; 1919–1960s) was a Chinese long-distance runner who was deaf and mute. He competed in the marathon at the 1948 Summer Olympics.
