= Ollie Manninen =

American long-distance runner

Personal information
- Nationality: American
- Born: January 9, 1917 Worcester, Massachusetts, United States
- Died: January 7, 1999 (aged 81) Gardner, Massachusetts, United States

Sport
- Sport: Long-distance running
- Event: Marathon

Ollie Manninen (January 9, 1917 – January 7, 1999) was an American long-distance runner. He competed in the marathon at the 1948 Summer Olympics.
