= József Dobronyi =

Hungarian marathon runner

- Born: 17 June 1917; Budapest, Hungary
- Died: 24 March 1993 (aged 75); Budapest, Hungary

József Dobronyi (17 June 1917 – 24 March 1993) was a Hungarian athlete who came in 7th place in the men's marathon at the 1952 Summer Olympics in Helsinki.

Dobronyi was born and died in Budapest.
