= Arsène Piesset =

French long-distance runner

Personal information
- Nationality: French
- Born: 31 July 1919
- Died: 21 December 1987 (aged 68)

Sport
- Sport: Long-distance running
- Event: Marathon

Arsène Piesset (31 July 1919 – 21 December 1987) was a French long-distance runner. He competed in the marathon at the 1948 Summer Olympics.
