= Paddy Mulvihill =

Irish long-distance runner

Personal information
- Nationality: Irish
- Born: 8 August 1909
- Died: 24 November 1965 (aged 56)

Sport
- Sport: Long-distance running
- Event: Marathon

Francis Patrick Dominic Mulvihill (8 August 1909 – 24 November 1965) was an Irish long-distance runner. He competed in the marathon at the 1948 Summer Olympics.
