= Erik Simonsen =

Danish long-distance runner

Personal information
- Nationality: Danish
- Born: 5 August 1915 Aalborg, Denmark
- Died: 1 December 2000 (aged 85)

Sport
- Sport: Long-distance running
- Event: Marathon

Erik Simonsen (5 August 1915 – 1 December 2000) was a Danish long-distance runner. He competed in the marathon at the 1952 Summer Olympics.
