= Krishna Chaithanya =

Writer

Krishna Chaitanya was the pen name of Krishnapillai Krishnankutty Nair (24 November 1918 – 5 June 1994), known as K.K. Nair. He is an author of about 40 books on the subjects of art, literature, philosophy and education, and an art critic, musicologist and photographer.

== Early life and education ==
Nair was the eldest of three children born to P.A. Krishna Pillai, an advocate, and Gowri Thankamma, a housewife. He was born in Trivandrum and died in New Delhi. His early schooling and education was between Trivandrum and Allepy in the erstwhile state of Travancore at that time under the Madras Presidency. Chaitanya graduated from the Madras University, standing first both in B.A. and M.A. with Biology as his subject in the former and English Literature in the latter.

== Career ==
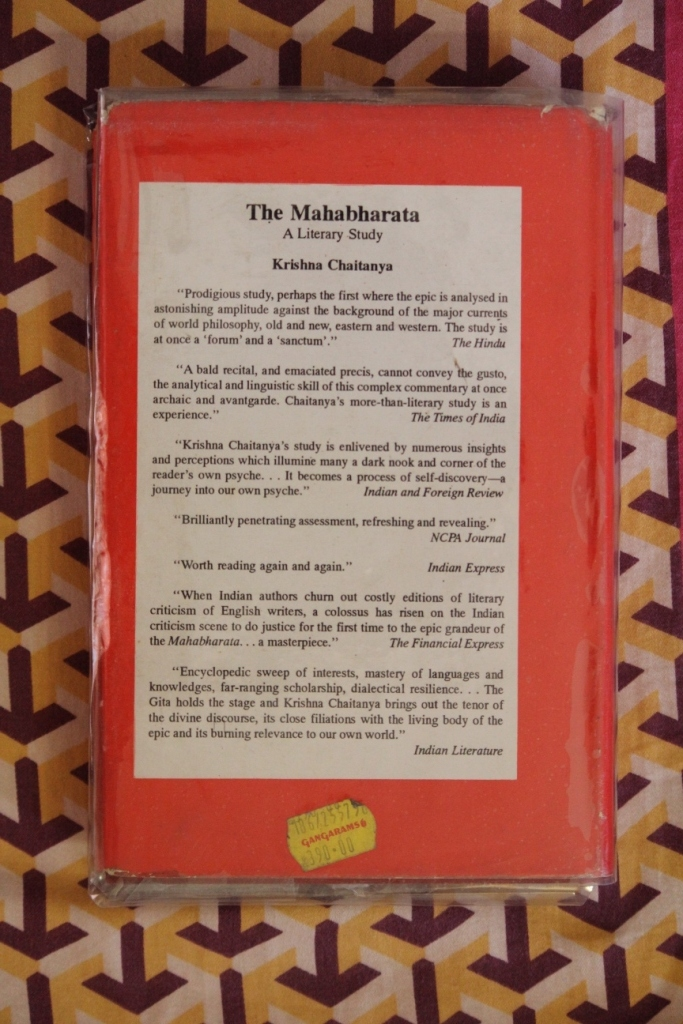
This is the reviews of the book Mahabharata, a literary study by Krishna Chaitanya a.k.a. K.K Nair, on the back cover of his book.

Nair spent most of his life in Delhi where he retired as Director, Directorate of Advertising and Visual Publicity of the Government of India. Most of his works are related to the history of literature.

The major categories of his works are: a five-volume philosophy of freedom for which he got a Jawaharlal Nehru Fellowship (1978); a ten-volume history of world literature in English and several Indian languages which won a special award from the Kerala Sahitya Academy; several books on Indology; books for children published during the International Year of the Child.

Chaitanya is the author of a four-volume history of Indian painting, has been for three decades art critic of one Indian periodical and music and dance critic of another, has been a member of the jury for Madhya Pradesh Government's Kalidas Samman Award for eminent musician (1985) and visual artist (1987).

As Chairman or member of functional committees he has been associated with over a dozen national cultural organizations and institutions in India. He is a recipient of the ‘Critics of ideas’ award (1964) from the Institute of International education, New York. He was honoured with a D Litt (Honoris Causa) by the Rabindra Bharati University in 1986 and received the Padma Shri from the Indian Government in 1992.

== Works ==
Malayalam

- Samskrithahile Sahitya thathwa chintha
- Samskritha Sahithya Charithram
- Yavana Sahithya Charithram
- Roman Sahithya Charithram
- Yahooda Sahithya Charithram
- Pilkala Latheen Sahithya Charithram
- Egyptian Sahithya Charithram
- Mesopotemian Sahithya Charithram
- Purathana Greek sahithyam
- Purathana Jutha sahithyam
- Vijnanathinte moulika Thathwa thrayam
- Shasthrathinte Viswavalokanam

English

- Sanskrit Poetics
- A new History of Sanskrit literature
- Ravi varma
- Portfolio of Indian Paintings
- The Mahabharata-a literary study
- The Gita for Modern Man
- The Betrayal of Krishna
- The biology of freedom
- The sociology of freedom
- The physics and chemistry of freedom
- The psychology of freedom
- A History of World Literature: Vol.1 Ancient Mesopotamian and Egyptian Literature (pub 1964)
- A History of World Literature: Vol.2 Ancient Greek Literature (pub 1965)
- A History of World Literature: Vol.3 Ancient Roman Literature (pub 1966)
- A History of World Literature: Vol.4 Ancient Jewish Literature (pub 1968)
