= Pierre Cousin =

French long-distance runner

Personal information
- Nationality: French
- Born: 14 June 1913
- Died: 25 March 1963 (aged 49)

Sport
- Sport: Long-distance running
- Event: Marathon

Pierre Cousin (14 June 1913 – 25 March 1963) was a French long-distance runner. He competed in the marathon at the 1948 Summer Olympics.
