= Antonia Matos =

Guatemalan painter

- Born: 21 November 1902; Guatemala City, Guatemala
- Died: 22 June 1994 (aged 91); Guatemala City, Guatemala
- Occupation: Painter

Antonia Matos (21 November 1902 – 22 June 1994) was a Guatemalan painter. Her work was part of the painting event in the art competition at the 1932 Summer Olympics in which she submitted the oil painting "La Carrera de Piraguas". She is most well known for her nude paintings.

She studied painting at the private academy of Justo de Gandarias and Agustin Iriarte between 1916 and 1917, and was among the first registered to the National Academy of Painting, founded in 1920. She spent a considerable amount of her life in Paris, where she came into contact with many notable figures in the art world of the early 1900s, as well as participating in art exhibitions such as the Salon des Tuilleries, the Salon de la Sociente des Artistes Francais in 1928, and the Exposition of the Societe des Artistes Independants in 1930.

== Biography ==
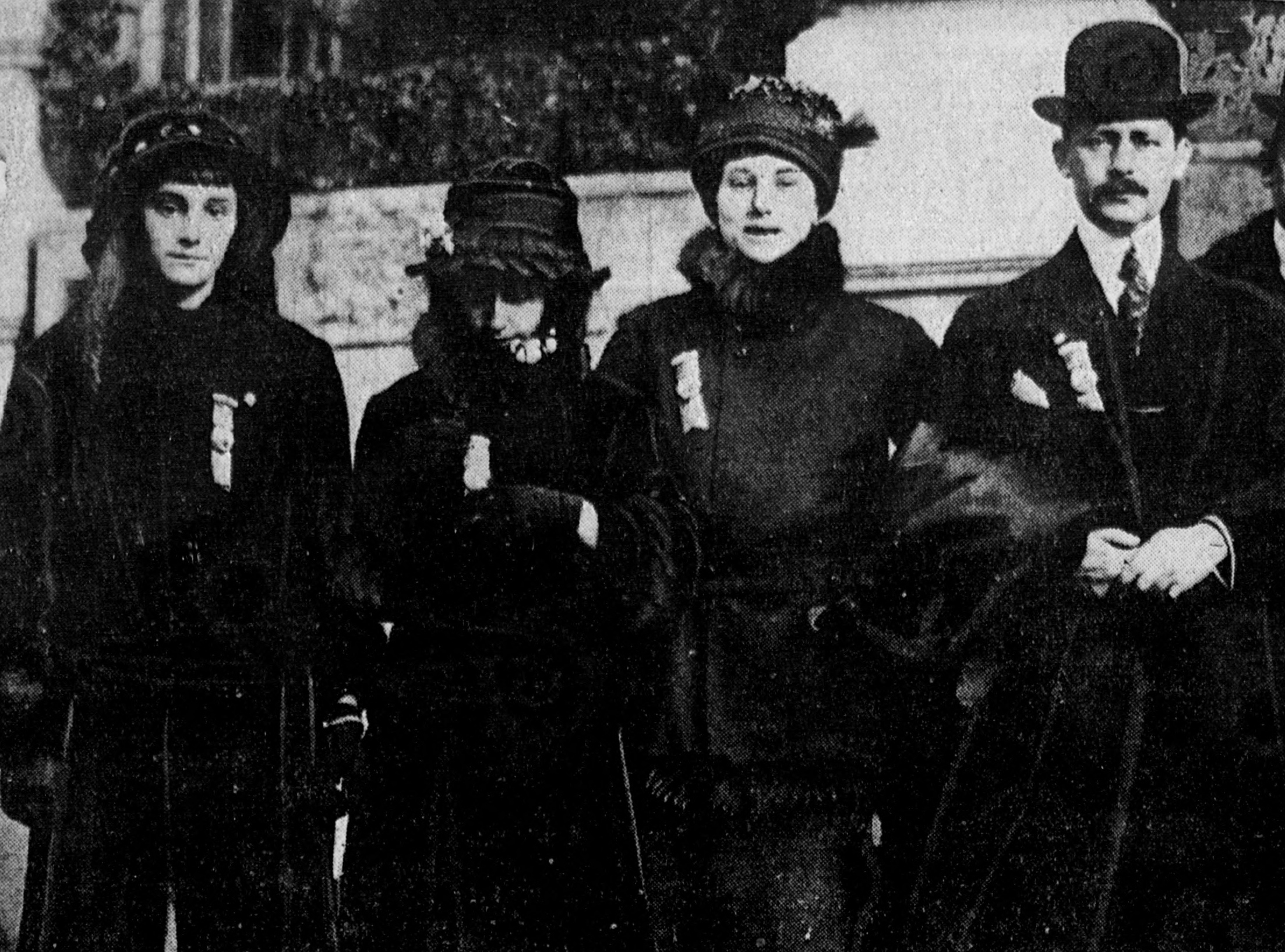
Matos (second from left) with her parents and sister visiting Philadelphia in January, 1916

Born the 21st of November in 1902, Antonia Clementina Matos Aycinena was born in zone 1 of Guatemala City to parents Don Jose Matos Pacheco, a doctor of International Law from the Central University of Madrid, and Antonia Aycinena Payes. Born before her was an older sister named Maria, who would later study piano under the tutelage of Jan Paderewski in Paris. Both of her parents were of distinguished Guatemalan families.

Guatemala in the early 1900s was idyllic and peaceful, but also very conservative and rife with prejudice. Traditionally, men saw over the maintenance and decisions of the home and women were expected to stay home and learn to cook, sew, paint, and play the piano. The expectations of women were slim an only extended to that of childrearing and schooling limited to language and religion. These expectations were even stricter for someone like Antonia, who was born of high social status. And so Antonia and her sister followed in that path, studying to cook at the Cordon Bleu school of Paris, France and each developing their crafts in the arts.

Her father, Don Jose Matos, carried out a successful political life. During the reign of General Jorge Ubico, he was close friends with the then Prime Minister of England Anthony Eden. General Ubico himself wished for Don Jose to be sent as a diplomat to the League of Nations in order to resolve the dispute with Belize. This endeavor to settle the dispute would eventually fail, as Anthony Eden disproved of the idea of Belize being returned to Guatemala, but this opportunity would allow for Don Jose to flourish in his position at the League of Nations and eventually be elected its president.

== Career ==
Antonia would travel to Paris between the years 1927 and 1928, and during her time spent in Paris she experienced the intense cultural difference between that of Guatemala and France. Juxtaposed to the extreme conservatism she knew in her home country, Parisian society instead celebrated a certain level of moral and religious freedom, often expressed in the surrealist and Dadaist art styles of the time.

It would be through this comparative freedom that Antonia Mato's style and vision would fully develop, since it was in France she would develop her signature style and skill in oil painting through nude studies. She was admitted to the School of Fine Arts of Paris as the first Latin American woman and studied under her teacher Lucien Simon. Although her life as a painter was criticized by her parents, her time in France would see her experience an unusual amount of success and allowed her a rich social life amongst peers like Pablo Picasso and Carlos Mérida, the latter of whom would prove to be a great influence on her art.

Antonia Mato's most notable achievement would be her participation in the 1932 Olympics Los Angeles painting competition, for which she entered with her painting "La Carerra de Piraguas". Even though she was permitted to participate, her participation wasn't official since Guatemala was not a recognized participating nation at the time. For her skill she was awarded an honorable mention, and her painting for the event was displayed at the Los Angeles Country Museum of History, Science, and Art from July to August.

Nearing the end of the 1930s, however, saw the election and rise of the National Party in Germany and as political tension rose, Antonia's father decided to leave Paris before the beginning of any conflict and return home to Guatemala. Instead of settling into a large city with any friends she'd made abroad, Antonia agreed to return home to Guatemala as the social climate was unfriendly to the idea of a single socialite to live alone abroad.

== Education ==
Antonia attended several schools in her life targeted towards the arts. At home in Guatemala she was enrolled in the National Academy of Painting, and then later enrolled in the National School of Fine Arts in 1920.

Most of her scholastic achievements come from her time in Paris between 1927 and 1928 at the Parisian School of Fine Arts, during which time she would paint "Los Desnudos", a series of nude paintings that denote her style and gain her recognition as an artist. During this time, between 1931 and 1933 she would win four awards as well as participate in the 1932 Olympics in California, USA.

During her time in Paris, along with her sister, she also attended the Cordon Bleu School of Culinary arts to improve upon her cooking skills.

== Controversies ==
Upon returning from it and settling down again in Guatemala, Antonia Matos made contact with her former teachers and colleagues in local Guatemalan art, without realizing that she had already advanced much more than all of them, both in subject matter and in quality. Eventually, she decided to try and set up an exhibition in Guatemala similar to the one she'd set up at the Zak Gallery in Paris. Between the ninth and the 23rd in the exhibition hall of the National Academy of Arts in Guatemala, Antonia displayed the nude paintings she'd displayed to great praise in France, and was instead met with an intense wave of backlash and negative criticism, as the conservative nature of Guatemala at the time found it unbecoming for a woman of high social standing to paint nudes.

The exhibition was brief, and with no one in the arts scene of Guatemala defending her, Antonia Matos was ostracized from both the artistic and social world. In the aftermath, Antonia disappeared into her home and painted only for herself. Although her paintings would occasionally travel throughout Europe and the US in mobile exhibitions, it would take fifty years before any of her paintings to be exhibited in Guatemala.

== Accomplishments ==
=== Paintings ===
- La Carerra de Piraguas, oil painting on canvas, 1932. Exhibited at the 1932 Olympics.
- Los Desnudos, series of unnamed oil paintings on canvas.
- El Mulato, oil painting on cavas, date unknown.
- Indigenous Paintings, series of unnamed oil paintings.
- Still Lifes, series of unnamed oil paintings.
- Paisaje de Los Altos (Landscape of the Highlands), oil painting, 1933. Exhibited at the Zak Gallery.
- Retratos Familiares, series of unnamed oil paintings regarding Antonia's family.

=== Awards ===
- In 1931 she placed third in Oil Painting.
- In 1932 she placed first in Oil painting, and gains an honorable mention in the Olympics for her painting "La Carrrera de Piraguas" which was inspired by jungles she'd seen at Covadonga Hacienda in Guatemala.
- In 1933 she placed second place in Oil Painting and second place in Drawing.

=== Exhibitions ===
- Participated in the collective exhibitions of the Autumn Salon and Salon des Indépendants.
- Exhibited in the Zak Gallery in 1933.
- Solo exhibit in Guatemala, National Academy of Fine Arts, June 9 to the 23rd of 1934.

== General and cited references ==
- Francisco, Aguirre Matos, and Berger de Aguirre, Desirée. La Obra de Antonia Matos (Spanish Edition). CreateSpace Independent Publishing Platform, 2002.
- Grandin, Greg. The Guatemala Reader: History, Culture, Politics (The Latin America Readers). Duke University Press Books Duke University Press Books, 2011.
- Grandin, Greg. The Blood of Guatemala. Duke University Press, 2000.
- Bossan, Enrico. Guatemala: Memory and Timeless Avant-Garde: Contemporary Artists from Guatemala. First edition, Antiga edizioni, 2016.
- "Antonia Matos (Matos Aycinena-) (-De Massot) Biography, Olympic Medals, Records and Age". Olympics.com, International Olympic Committee, https://olympics.com/en/athletes/antonia-matos-matos-aycinena-de-massot.
- "Antonia Matos". Mente Creativa, Creative Mind, https://mentecreativagt.com/antonia-matos/.
- Cazali, Rosina. “One Hundred Times One: Hammer Museum.” Radical Women: Latin American
- Art, 1960–1985 Digital Archive | Hammer Museum, DelMonico Books, https://hammer.ucla.edu/radical-women/essays/one-hundred-times-one .
- Elattico. "Antonia Matos". GALERÍA EL ATTICO, GALERÍA EL ATTICO, 25 Apr. 2022, https://www.galeriaelattico.com/post/antonia-matos.
- Ruiz/elPeriódico, Ana Lucía Mendizábal. "Biografia De Antonia Matos, Pintora De Principios Del Siglo Xx Que Enfrentó La Censura". ElPeriodico, 9 Nov. 2022, https://elperiodico.com.gt/cultura/arte-diseno/2022/11/08/la-historia-de-antonia-matos-pintora-de-principios-del-siglo-xx-que-enfrento-la-censura/
