= Phil O'Donohue =

Australian rules footballer

Personal information
- Full name: Philip O'Donohue
- Born: 8 August 1926; Koroit, Victoria
- Died: 2 June 1994 (aged 67)
- Original team: Hawthorn CYMS (CYMSFA)
- Height: 180 cm (5 ft 11 in)
- Weight: 81 kg (179 lb)

Playing career^{1}
Years	Club	Games (Goals)
1945–46	Hawthorn	6 (0)
- ^{1} Playing statistics correct to the end of 1946.

Philip O'Donohue (8 August 1926 – 2 June 1994) was an Australian rules footballer who played with Hawthorn in the Victorian Football League (VFL).

He was the younger brother of Hawthorn player Peter O'Donohue.
