= Franjo Krajčar =

Yugoslav long-distance runner

Personal information
- Nationality: Yugoslav
- Born: 7 September 1914 Volosko, Austria-Hungary
- Died: 16 June 1994 (aged 79) Velika Gorica, Croatia

Sport
- Sport: Long-distance running
- Event: Marathon

Franjo Krajčar (7 September 1914 – 16 June 1994) was a Yugoslav long-distance runner. He competed in the marathon at the 1952 Summer Olympics.
