= Sven Håkansson =

Swedish long-distance runner

Sven Håkansson (14 November 1909 – 7 July 1997) was a Swedish long-distance runner who competed in the 1948 Summer Olympics.
