= Harry New (footballer) =

Australian rules footballer

Personal information
- Full name: Henry George Callow New
- Born: 16 July 1920; St Kilda, Victoria
- Died: 11 June 1994 (aged 73); Western Australia

Playing career^{1}
Years	Club	Games (Goals)
1944–45	Melbourne	2 (0)
1946	Brighton (VFA)	10 (1)
- ^{1} Playing statistics correct to the end of 1946.

Henry George Callow New (16 July 1920 – 11 June 1994) was an Australian rules footballer who played with Melbourne in the Victorian Football League (VFL).

Prior to playing with Melbourne, New served in the Australian Army during World War II.

After playing two senior games in two years with Melbourne, New switched to Brighton where he played with his brother Thomas New in 1946.
