= Norm Honey =

Australian rules footballer, born 1914

Personal information
- Full name: Norman McLeod Honey
- Born: 26 January 1914
- Died: 19 June 1994 (aged 80); Albury
- Height: 157 cm (5 ft 2 in)
- Weight: 60 kg (132 lb)

Playing career^{1}
Years	Club	Games (Goals)
1933–34	Footscray	10 (4)
- ^{1} Playing statistics correct to the end of 1934.

Norman McLeod Honey (26 January 1914 – 19 June 1994) was an Australian rules footballer who played with Footscray in the Victorian Football League (VFL).
