= René Josset =

French long-distance runner

René Raymond Josset
Personal information
- Nationality: French
- Born: 28 July 1910 Paris, France
- Died: 19 January 1979 (aged 68) Saint-Georges-de-Didonne, France

Sport
- Sport: Long-distance running
- Event: Marathon

René Raymond Josset (28 July 1910 – 19 January 1979) was a French long-distance runner. He competed in the marathon at the 1948 Summer Olympics.
