= Les Johnson (footballer, born 1917) =

Australian rules footballer, born 1917

Personal information
- Full name: Les Johnson
- Born: 10 February 1917
- Died: 3 June 1994 (aged 77)
- Height: 183 cm (6 ft 0 in)
- Weight: 80 kg (176 lb)

Playing career^{1}
Years	Club	Games (Goals)
1936	Footscray	5 (0)
- ^{1} Playing statistics correct to the end of 1936.

Les Johnson (10 February 1917 – 3 June 1994) was an Australian rules footballer who played with Footscray in the Victorian Football League (VFL).
