= Arcadie Sarcadi =

Romanian water polo player (born 1925)

Personal information
- Nationality: Romanian
- Born: 15 January 1925; Aiud, Romania
- Died: 7 September 2002 (aged 77)

Sport
- Sport: Water polo

Arcadie Sarcadi (15 January 1925 – 7 September 2002) was a Romanian water polo player. He competed in the men's tournament at the 1952 Summer Olympics.
