= Henning Larsen (athlete) =

Danish marathon runner

Henning Karl Larsen (12 December 1910 – 11 January 2011) was a Danish marathon runner who competed at the 1948 Summer Olympics in London. Larsen joined Helsingør IF's football program at the age of 13 but eventually switched to representing the club in track and field athletics. He went on to earn twelve national titles, including nine in the marathon, and finished 8th and 10th in the marathon at the 1946 European Athletics Championships and 1948 Summer Olympics respectively. Outside of athletics he ran a grocery store and a dry cleaning business and provided the financing to found the Helsingør Pigegarde (Helsingør Women's Guard). He died in January 2011, one month after his hundredth birthday.

== Early life and athletic career ==
Larsen was born on 12 December 1910 in Helsingør, Denmark. At the age of 13 he began playing football for Helsingør IF (now Elite 3000 Fodbold). By 1928, however, he had switched to track and field athletics and began running for the club in cross-country tournaments. During the early 1930s he was both a cross-country and middle distance runner for the club, but he later focused exclusively on long distances, after coming in third in the 5,000m event at the Danish National Championships in 1935.

Larsen became the Danish national 5,000 and 10,000m champion in 1937, earning Helsingør IF's first running title. He went on to capture ten more national championships, nine in the marathon (1941, 1943–1950) and one in the 20 km (1950), as well as coming in third place in the 10,000m in 1938. In 1946 he set the Danish national record for the marathon at 2:38:36 and competed in that year's European Athletics Championships, placing eighth in the marathon. His next major international stop was the 1948 Summer Olympics, where he came in tenth in a field of 41 competitors in the same event.

== Later life ==
Larsen retired from active competition in 1954, at the age of 44, having earned 43 Zealand titles in addition to his national and international achievements. He continued to run non-competitively alongside his brothers for many years after his retirement and also took up pigeon racing as a hobby. Outside of athletics he worked as an errand boy before managing a grocery store in Helsingør from 1932 through 1964. He also ran a dry cleaning store and helped provide the financing to found the Helsingør Pigegarde (Helsingør Women's Guard) in 1957. He was an honorary chairman of Helsingør IF and a member for almost 90 years. He turned 100 on 12 December 2010, and, as part of the celebrations, a fund to help finance youth programs for Helsingør IF was established in his honour. He died one month later, on 11 January 2011, in a nursing home in Helsingør.

== See also ==
- List of centenarians (sportspeople)
