= Dieter Engelhardt (athlete) =

German long-distance runner

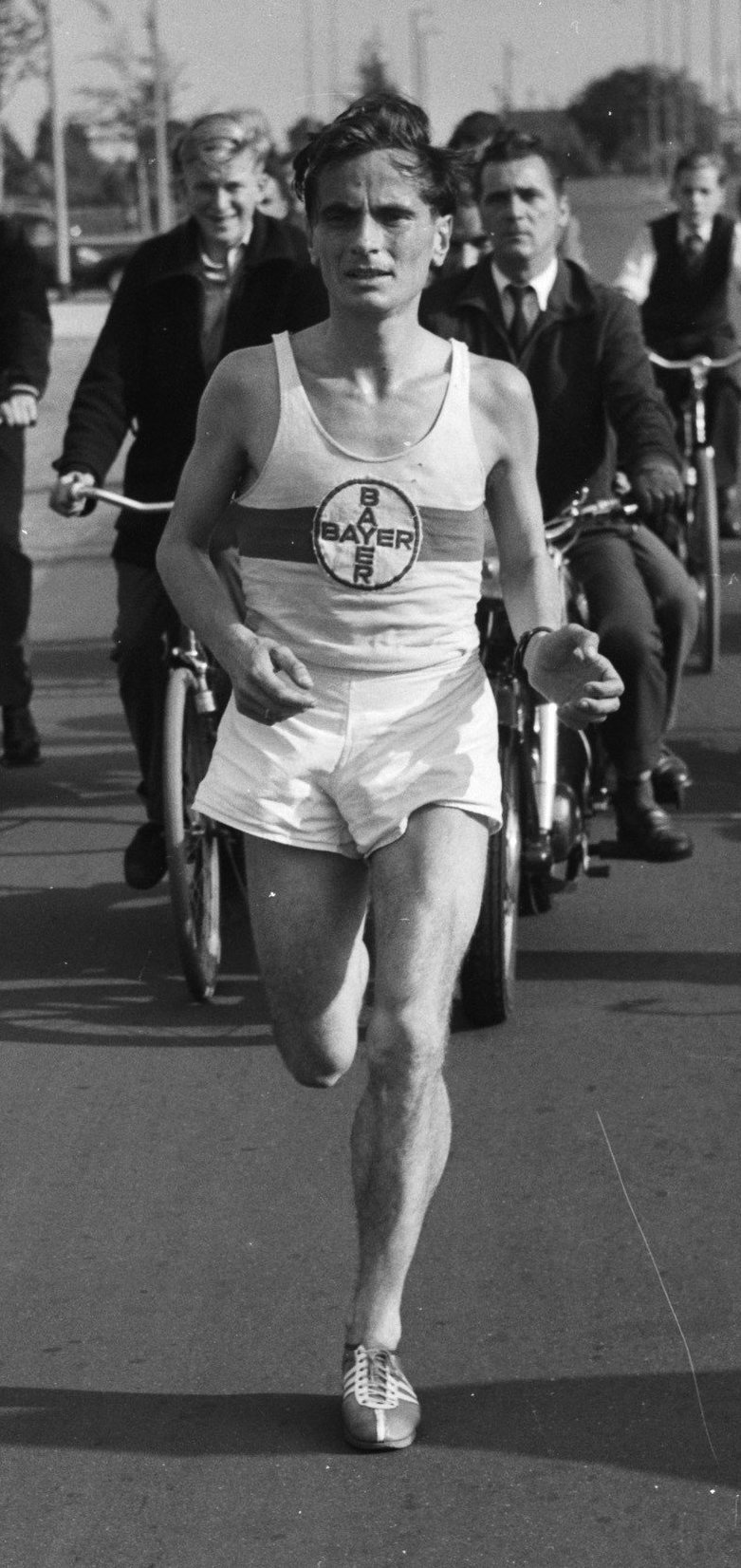
- Dieter Engelhardt (1956)

Personal information
- Nationality: German
- Born: 24 February 1926 Hanover, Lower Saxony, Germany

Sport
- Sport: Long-distance running
- Event: Marathon

Dieter Engelhardt (born 24 February 1926) was a German long-distance runner. He competed in the marathon at the 1952 Summer Olympics.
