= Armando Sensini =

Argentine marathon runner

Personal information
- Full name: Armando Pedro Sensini
- Born: 21 September 1909 Bahia Blanca, Argentina
- Died: 21 October 1979 (aged 70) Mar del Plata, Argentina
- Height: 1.70 m (5 ft 7 in)
- Weight: 65 kg (143 lb)

Sport
- Sport: Track & Field
- Event: marathon

Armando Pedro Sensini (21 September 1909 – 21 October 1979) was an Argentine athlete who competed in the 1948 Summer Olympics in the marathon, where he finished 9th.

== International competitions ==
Year	Competition	Venue	Position	Event	Notes
Representing Argentina
1947	South American Championships	Rio de Janeiro, Brazil	1st	Road race	1:56:23
1948	Olympic Games	London, United Kingdom	9th	Marathon	2:39:30
1949	South American Championships	Lima, Peru	5th	20 km	1:09:36

== Personal bests ==
- Marathon – 2:39:30 (1948)
