= Johannes Coleman =

South African marathon runner

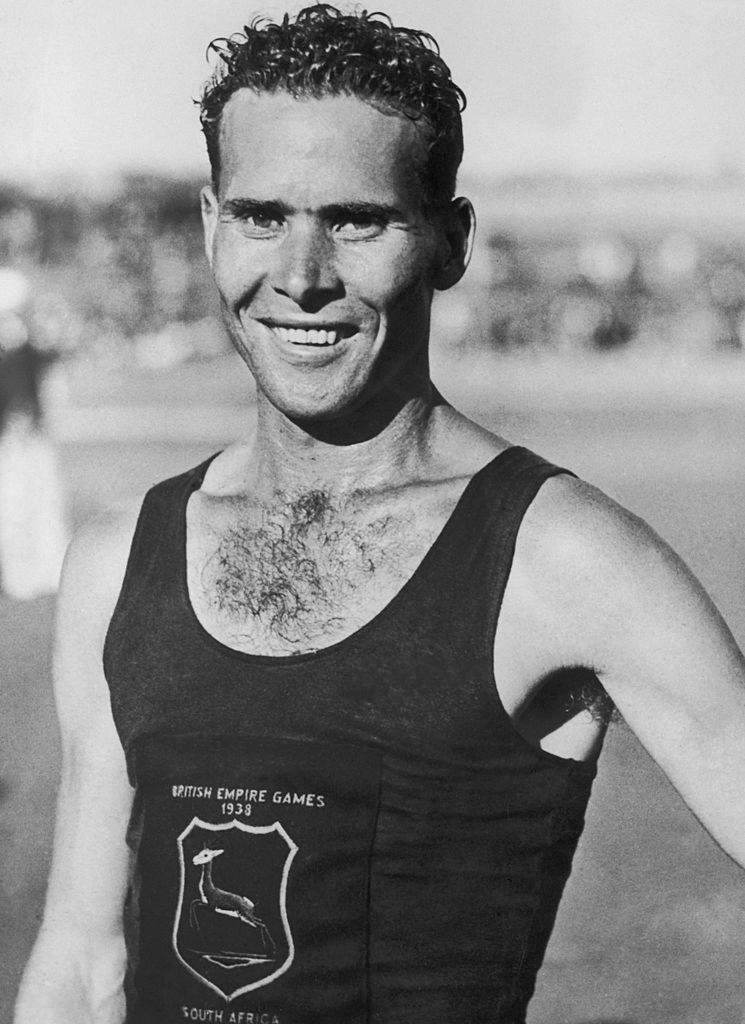
- Coleman at the 1938 British Empire Games

Personal information
- Born: 5 June 1910 Oudtshoorn, South Africa
- Died: 13 January 1997 (aged 86) Johannesburg, South Africa

Sport
- Sport: Athletics
- Event: Marathon

Achievements and titles
- Personal best: 2:30:49 (1938)
Medal record
Representing South Africa
British Empire Games
| Gold medal – first place | 1938 Sydney | Marathon |

Johannes Lodewyk Meyer Coleman (5 June 1910 – 13 January 1997) was a South African marathon runner. He won a gold medal at the 1938 British Empire Games, and placed sixth and fourth at the 1936 and 1948 Summer Olympics, respectively. At the 1938 Games he also participated in the 6 mile event, but was disqualified.
