= Constantin Radu (athlete) =

Romanian long-distance runner

Personal information
- Nationality: Romanian
- Born: 13 February 1912

Sport
- Sport: Long-distance running
- Event: Marathon

Constantin Radu (born 13 February 1912) was a Romanian long-distance runner. He competed in the marathon at the 1952 Summer Olympics.
