= Hans Frischknecht =

Swiss long-distance runner

Personal information
- Nationality: Swiss
- Born: 31 December 1922
- Died: 9 August 2003 (aged 80)

Sport
- Sport: Long-distance running
- Event: Marathon

Hans Frischknecht (31 December 1922 – 9 August 2003) was a Swiss long-distance runner. He competed in the marathon at the 1948 Summer Olympics.
