= John Yurchey =

American football player (1917–1994)

- Yurchey in 1939.

No. 11
- Positions: Quarterback, halfback, defensive back

Personal information
- Born: November 12, 1917; Bridgeville, Pennsylvania, U.S.
- Died: June 1, 1994 (aged 76); Bridgeville, Pennsylvania, U.S.
- Listed height: 5 ft 11 in (1.80 m)
- Listed weight: 188 lb (85 kg)

Career information
- High school: Bridgeville (PA)
- College: Duquesne
- NFL draft: 1940: undrafted

Career history
- Pittsburgh Steelers (1940)

Career NFL statistics
- Games played: 1
- Punts: 3
- Punting yards: 121
- Stats at Pro Football Reference

John Henry Yurchey (November 12, 1917 – June 1, 1994) was an American professional football player who was a quarterback, halfback, and defensive back for one game in the National Football League (NFL) with the Pittsburgh Steelers. He played college football for the Duquesne Dukes.

Yurchey was born on November 12, 1917, in Bridgeville, Pennsylvania. He attended Bridgeville High School there before playing college football at Duquesne University. He saw significant playing time starting as a sophomore, playing the quarterback position. As a senior, he helped the team achieve an undefeated 8–0–1 record, including an upset victory over number one ranked Pittsburgh.

Though Yurchey went unselected in the 1940 NFL draft, he was signed by the Pittsburgh Steelers, and appeared in one regular season game. He wore number 11, and played halfback and defensive back. He also made three punts for 121 yards, with two going for 40 yards and one for 41. It would be his only career game.

After his brief stint in professional football, Yurchey served as an air traffic controller during World War II, and was a postal clerk at the Bridgeville Post Office for 15 years. He died on June 1, 1994, in Bridgeville, from a heart attack.
