= Kaspar Schiesser =

Swiss long-distance runner

Personal information
- Nationality: Swiss
- Born: 28 January 1916
- Died: 25 May 2007 (aged 91)

Sport
- Sport: Long-distance running
- Event: Marathon

Kaspar Schiesser (28 January 1916 – 25 May 2007) was a Swiss long-distance runner. He competed in the marathon at the 1948 Summer Olympics.
