= Edward Kocząb =

Polish ice hockey player (1928–2002)

- Born: 2 August 1928; Krynica, Poland
- Died: 17 September 2002 (aged 74); Płock, Poland
- Height: 5 ft 7 in (170 cm)
- Weight: 141 lb (64 kg; 10 st 1 lb)
- Position: Goaltender
- Played for: Legia Warsaw; KTH Krynica
- National team: Poland
- Playing career: 1946–1964

Edward Kocząb (2 August 1928 — 17 September 2002) was a Polish ice hockey player. He played for Legia Warsaw and KTH Krynica during his career. He also played for the Polish national team at the 1956 Winter Olympics and several World Championships.
