= Dave Withers =

Australian rules footballer, born 1911

Personal information
- Full name: David Egerton Withers
- Born: 15 February 1911; Maryborough, Victoria
- Died: 23 June 1994 (aged 83)
- Original team: West Hawthorn
- Height: 188 cm (6 ft 2 in)
- Weight: 72 kg (159 lb)

Playing career^{1}
Years	Club	Games (Goals)
1928–30	Hawthorn	11 (18)
- ^{1} Playing statistics correct to the end of 1930.

David Egerton Withers (15 February 1911 – 23 June 1994) was an Australian rules footballer who played with Hawthorn in the Victorian Football League (VFL).
