= Atila Kelemen =

Romanian water polo player

Personal information
- Nationality: Romanian
- Born: 7 May 1919; Târgu Mureș, Romania
- Died: 24 June 1994 (aged 75); Târgu Mureș, Romania

Sport
- Sport: Water polo

Atila Kelemen (born 7 May 1919 – 24 June 1994) was a Romanian water polo player. He competed in the men's tournament at the 1952 Summer Olympics.
