= Vince Cross =

Australian rules footballer, born 1919

Personal information
- Full name: Vince Cross
- Born: 22 February 1919
- Died: 7 June 1994 (aged 75)
- Height: 184 cm (6 ft 0 in)
- Weight: 89 kg (196 lb)

Playing career^{1}
Years	Club	Games (Goals)
1943–45	North Melbourne	4 (0)
- ^{1} Playing statistics correct to the end of 1945.

Vince Cross (22 February 1919 – 7 June 1994) was an Australian rules footballer who played with North Melbourne in the Victorian Football League (VFL).
