= Inger Lemvigh-Müller =

Danish equestrian

Personal information
- Nationality: Danish
- Born: 28 October 1902; Copenhagen, Denmark
- Died: 21 June 1994 (aged 91); Virum, Denmark

Sport
- Sport: Equestrian

Inger Lemvigh-Müller (28 October 1902 – 21 June 1994) was a Danish equestrian. She competed in two events at the 1956 Summer Olympics.
