= Ludwig Warnemünde =

German long-distance runner (1916–2002)

Personal information
- Nationality: German
- Born: 30 October 1916 Kiel, Germany
- Died: 24 September 2002 (aged 85) Pinneberg, Germany

Sport
- Sport: Long-distance running
- Event: Marathon

Ludwig Warnemünde (10 October 1916 – 24 September 2002) was a German long-distance runner. He competed in the marathon at the 1952 Summer Olympics.
