= Walter Chikowski =

Canadian football player (1915–1994)

Chick Chikowski
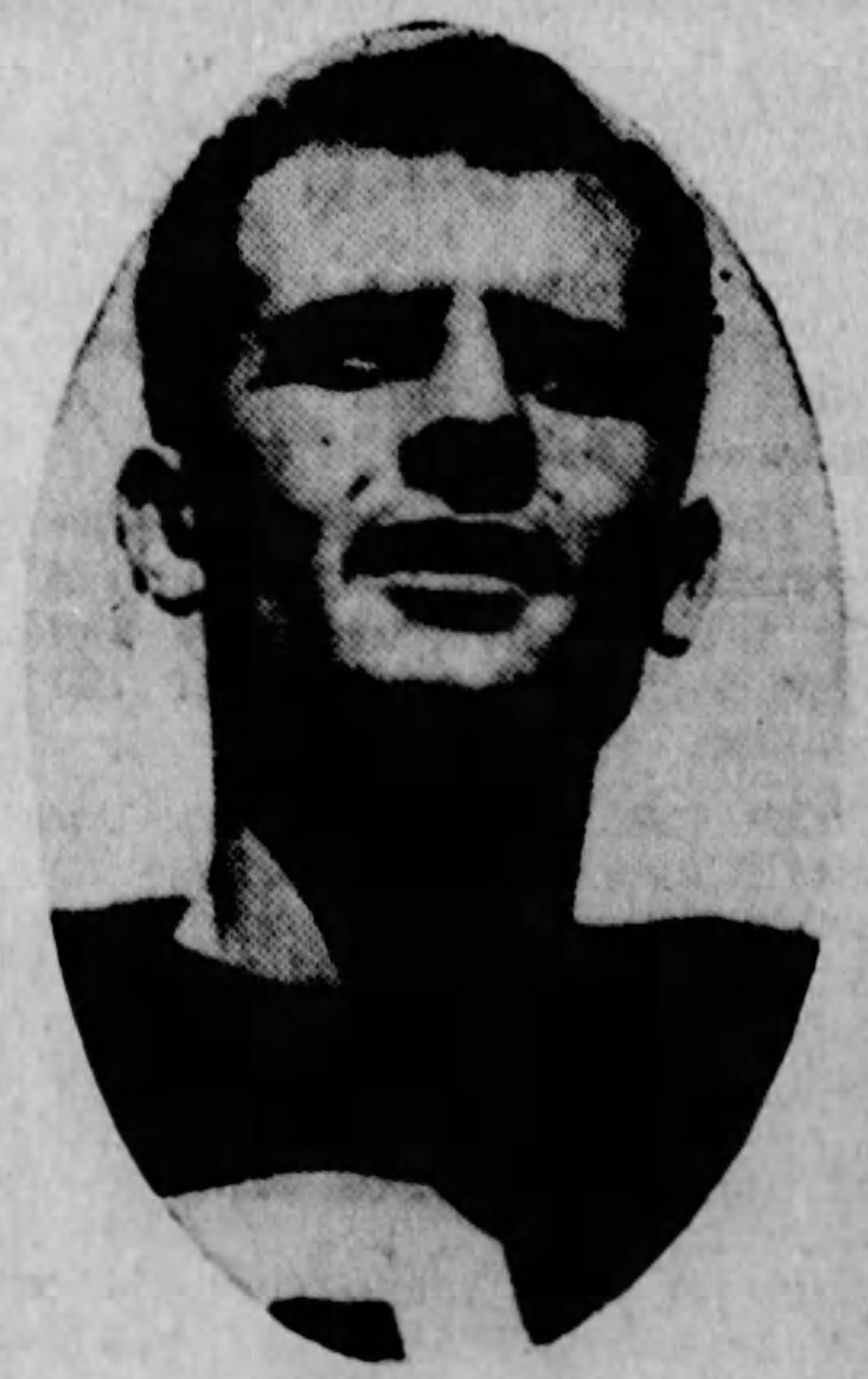
- Chikowski c. 1947

Profile
- Positions: End, Halfback

Personal information
- Born: November 23, 1915; Springwell, Rural Municipality of Lac du Bonnet, Manitoba, Canada
- Died: June 30, 1994 (aged 78); Winnipeg, Manitoba, Canada
- Listed height: 6 ft 0 in (1.83 m)
- Listed weight: 190 lb (86 kg)

Career history
- 1941, 1946: Winnipeg Blue Bombers
- 1948: Calgary Stampeders

Awards and highlights
- Grey Cup champion (1948)

Walter Chikowski (November 23, 1915 – June 30, 1994) was a Canadian professional football player who played for the Calgary Stampeders and Winnipeg Blue Bombers. He won the Grey Cup with the Stampeders in 1948. He played junior football in Winnipeg and was a veteran of the Royal Canadian Air Force in World War II. He died in 1994.
