= Hong Jong-o =

South Korean long-distance runner (1925–2011)

Personal information
- Nationality: South Korean
- Born: 7 July 1925
- Died: 13 September 2011 (aged 86)

Sport
- Sport: Long-distance running
- Event: Marathon

Hong Jong-o (Korean: 홍종오, 7 July 1925 – 13 September 2011) was a South Korean long-distance runner. He competed in the marathon at the 1948 Summer Olympics and the 1952 Summer Olympics.

Hong won the first Son Kee-chung World Championship Chosun Ilbo Marathon. He later served as the director of the Monopoly Bureau, the CEO of Namyang Ink, and the director of the Jeong Jin-gi Media and Culture Foundation. Hong died on 13 September 2011, at the age of 86.
