= Jean Leblond =

Belgian marathon runner (1920–1996)

Personal information
- Nationality: Belgian
- Born: 2 June 1920 Brugelette, Belgium
- Died: 1996 (aged 75–76) Ath, Belgium

Sport
- Sport: Long-distance running
- Event: Marathon

Jean Leblond (2 June 1920 – 1996) was a Belgian long-distance runner. He competed in the marathon at the 1952 Summer Olympics.

Leblond died in Ath in 1996.
