= Syd Luyt =

South African long-distance runner

Personal information
- Nationality: South African
- Born: 11 December 1925 Germiston, South Africa
- Died: 4 June 2010 (aged 84)

Sport
- Sport: Long-distance running
- Event: Marathon

Thomas Sydney Andrew Luyt (11 December 1925 – 4 June 2010) was a South African long-distance runner. He competed in the marathon at the 1948 Summer Olympics and the 1952 Summer Olympics.
