= Tom Richards (athlete) =

British long-distance runner (1910–1985)

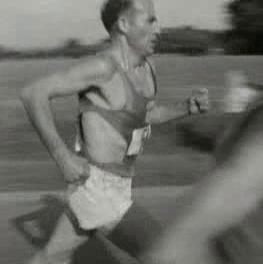
- Tom Richards (1951)

Personal information
- Nationality: British (Welsh)
- Born: 15 March 1910 Upper Cwmbran, Wales
- Died: 19 January 1985 (aged 74) London, England
- Height: 165 cm (5 ft 5 in)
- Weight: 55 kg (8 st 9 lb)

Sport
- Sport: Athletics
- Event: long-distance
- Club: South London Harriers
Medal record
Representing Great Britain
Athletics
Summer Olympics
| Silver medal – second place | 1948 London | Marathon |

Thomas John Henry Richards (15 March 1910 – 19 January 1985) was a Welsh athlete who specialised mainly in the marathon. He competed at the 1948 Summer Olympics and won a silver medal. He was the first Welsh athlete to win an individual Olympic track and field medal.

== Biography ==
Richards, born in Upper Cwmbran, Wales, moved to London in the 1930s to find work and found it at Tooting Bec Hospital, in South London. He initially ran for Mitcham AC before joining South London Harriers. He finished third behind Squire Yarrow in the marathon event at the 1946 AAA Championships The following two years, Richards finished runner-up to Jack Holden at Loughborough in the 1947 AAA Championships and in London at the 1948 AAA Championships.

Richards represented the Great Britain team at the 1948 Olympic Games in London, where he won the Olympic silver medal behind Argentinian Delfo Cabrera in the marathon.

At the 1949 AAA Championships, Richards was once again beaten by his nemesis (but later a great friend) Jack Holden. He represented the Welsh athletics team at the 1950 British Empire Games in Auckland, New Zealand, finishing fifth (the race being won by Holden). Richards never won an AAA title, having to contend with Holden before he finally had a chance to win the 1951 AAA Championships but came up against the new marathon star Jim Peters (who would break the world record four times).

He won the Welsh marathon title five times and was inducted into the Welsh Athletics Hall of Fame.
