= Gustav Östling =

Swedish long-distance runner

Personal information
- Nationality: Swedish
- Born: 17 December 1914 Gävle, Sweden
- Died: 9 July 1989 (aged 74) Gävle, Sweden

Sport
- Sport: Long-distance running
- Event: Marathon

Gustav Östling (17 December 1914 – 9 July 1989) was a Swedish long-distance runner. He competed in the marathon at the 1948 Summer Olympics and the 1952 Summer Olympics.
