= John Systad =

Norwegian long-distance runner

Personal information
- Nationality: Norwegian
- Born: September 14, 1912
- Died: September 16, 1998 (aged 86)

Sport
- Sport: Athletics

John Systad (14 September 1912 – 16 September 1998) was a Norwegian long-distance runner who specialized in the marathon race. He represented TIF Viking in Bergen.

He finished twelfth at the 1946 European Championships, eighth at the 1948 Summer Olympics, ninth at the 1950 European Championships and finally 34th at the 1952 Summer Olympics. He became Norwegian marathon champion in the years 1950-1953 and 1955.

His personal best time was 2:32:16 hours, achieved in October 1956 in Sandvika.

== Achievements ==
Year	Competition	Venue	Position	Event	Notes
Representing Norway
1952	Olympic Games	Helsinki, Finland	34th	Marathon	2:41:29.8
