= Henry Awards =

Award organization

The Henry Awards
- 7/20/26
- Awarded for: Excellence in professional Colorado theatre
- Sponsored by: Colorado Theatre Guild
- Location: Denver, Colorado
- Country: United States
- First award: 2006
- Website: coloradotheatreguild.org

Established in 2006, The Henry Awards honor outstanding achievements during the past season and serves as the Colorado Theatre Guild’s annual fundraising event. The awards are named for theatre producer Henry Lowenstein. Nominations are determined through a judging process conducted by more than 100 statewide peer professionals, academics / educators and other theatre lovers.

== Henry Lowenstein ==
The awards are named in honor of longtime Colorado theatre producer and director Henry Lowenstein, who made significant artistic and advocacy contributions to the local theatre community over many decades.

== Current Awards ==
In 2026, awards were presented in 28 categories. The categories are Outstanding Production of a Play, Outstanding Production of a Musical, Outstanding Direction of a Play, Outstanding Direction of a Musical, Outstanding Musical Direction, Outstanding Lead Performance in a Play (Tier 1), Outstanding Lead Performance in a Play (Tier 2), Outstanding Lead Performance in a Musical (Tier 1), Outstanding Lead Performance in a Musical (Tier 2), Outstanding Featured Performance in a Play (Tier 1), Outstanding Featured Performance in a Play (Tier 2), Outstanding Featured Performance in a Musical (Tier 1), Outstanding Featured Performance in a Musical (Tier 2), Outstanding Ensemble Performance, Outstanding Choreography, Outstanding New Play or Musical - World Premiere, Outstanding Costume Design (Tier 1), Outstanding Costume Design (Tier 2), Outstanding Lighting Design (tier 1), Outstanding Lighting Design (tier 2), Outstanding Scenic Design (tier 1), Outstanding Scenic Design (Tier 2), Outstanding Sound Design (Tier 1), Outstanding Sound Design (Tier 2) and the Lifetime Achievement Award.

Eligibility for nomination is open to organizational member productions produced in Colorado that meet the Henry Award criteria. Judging categories are for productions, directors, designers and performers. Lifetime Achievement qualification has its own distinct criteria. Productions that are solely produced by a high school, college or university, children's theatre (shows that are by children for children), puppet shows, opera, performance art, mime theatre, unscripted, improvised productions or staged readings are not eligible for the Henry Awards.

Nominations and awards are determined by a panel of trained judges made up of theatre professionals, theatre educators and qualified theatre patrons. The Lifetime Achievement Award is determined by nominations from members of the Colorado theatre community. The recipient is selected from the nominees by the Colorado Theatre Guild Board of Directors.

== History ==
The first Henry Awards were presented on June 5, 2006 at the New Denver Civic Theatre. The original award statue was a ceramic mask designed to resemble the face of Henry Lowenstein, In 2018, the Henry Award was redesigned as a custom, engraved commemorative plaque.

In 2008, Outstanding Musical Direction was added as a award category.

In 2013, the pool of eligible productions expanded outside Denver and Northern Colorado to include Southern Colorado and theatres in the Mountains.

Also in 2013, the Colorado Theatre Guild decided to separate technical design categories into two tiers which were determined by the annual budget of the producing theatres. In 2022, the tier system was applied to the acting categories as well.

In 2025, the Colorado Theatre Guild chose to eliminate gender in the acting categories and present each acting award to the top two performers.

== 20th Annual Henry Awards ==
The 20th Annual Henry Awards were presented on July 20, 2026 at the Arvada Center for Arts and Humanities for the 2025-2026 season.

The 2025-2026 Henry Award winners were:

| Category | Winner |
| Outstanding Production of a Play | English, Denver Center Theatre Company |
| Outstanding Production of a Musical | Nice Work If You Can Get It, Lone Tree Arts Center |
| Outstanding Direction of a Play | Gordon Greenberg, Dracula: A Comedy of Terrors, DCPA Cabaret |
| Outstanding Direction of a Musical | Kate Gleason, Nice Work If You Can Get It, Lone Tree Arts Center |
| Outstanding Musical Direction | Alec Steinhorn, Nice Work If You Can Get It, Lone Tree Arts Center |
| Outstanding Lead Performance in a Play (Tier 1) | Bernard Dotson, Driving Miss Daisy, Theatre Aspen Kenneth Tigar, The Happiest Man on Earth, Denver Center Theatre Company |
| Outstanding Lead Performance in a Play (Tier 2) | Jeffrey Bigger, Another Medea, Bas Bleu Theatre Company Martha Harmon Pardee, Alabama Story, Firehouse Theatre Company |
| Outstanding Lead Performance in a Musical (Tier 1) | Adriane Leigh Robinson, Nice Work If You Can Get It, Lone Tree Arts Center Marco Alberto Robinson, Nice Work If You Can Get It, Lone Tree Arts Center |
| Outstanding Lead Performance in a Musical (Tier 2) | Adam Brett, Cabaret, Stage of Life (SoL) Theatre Company Maura Fawley, Cabaret, Stage of Life (SoL) Theatre Company |
| Outstanding Featured Performance in a Play (Tier 1) | Leslie O’Carroll, Dracula: A Comedy of Terrors, DCPA Cabaret Adriane Leigh Robinson, Dracula: A Comedy of Terrors, DCPA Cabaret |
| Outstanding Featured Performance in a Play (Tier 2) | Steve Emily, Frozen, Springs Ensemble Theatre Dia Kline, The Last Yiddish Speaker, Theatre Or |
| Outstanding Featured Performance in a Musical (Tier 1) | Elise Daniells,Nice Work If You Can Get It, Lone Tree Arts Center Jennifer DeDominici, Nice Work If You Can Get It, Lone Tree Arts Center Shabazz Green, Nice Work If You Can Get It, Lone Tree Arts Center |
| Outstanding Featured Performance in a Musical (Tier 2) | Jeffrey Parker, South Pacific, Performance Now Theatre Company Jason Rexx, Something Rotten!, StageDoor Theatre |
| Outstanding Ensemble Performance | Nice Work If You Can Get It, Lone Tree Arts Center |
| Outstanding Choreography | Christopher Page-Sanders, Nice Work If You Can Get It, Lone Tree Arts Center |
| Outstanding New Play or Musical - World Premiere | Godspeed, Written by Terence Anthony, Denver Center Theatre Company |
| Outstanding Costume Design (Tier 1) | Madison Booth, Nice Work If You Can Get It, Lone Tree Arts Center |
| Outstanding Costume Design (Tier 2) | Charlotte Campbell, Disney’s The Little Mermaid, Performance Now Theatre Company |
| Outstanding Lighting Design (Tier 1) | Charles R. MacLeod, Dracula: A Comedy of Terrors, DCPA Cabaret |
| Outstanding Lighting Design (Tier 2) | Josiah Croegaert, Jacob Marley’s Christmas Carol, Breckenridge Backstage Theatre |
| Outstanding Scenic Design (Tier 1) | Christopher L. Sheley, The Roommate, Colorado Springs Fine Arts Center at Colorado College |
| Outstanding Scenic Design (Tier 2) | Jim & Carla Brookman, The Cottage, OpenStage Theatre & Company |
| Outstanding Sound Design (Tier 1) | Max Silverman, Nice Work If You Can Get It, Lone Tree Arts Center |
| Outstanding Sound Design (Tier 2) | Madison Kuebler, Alabama Story, Firehouse Theatre Company |
| Lifetime Achievement Award | Dr. Brian Kelly, DDS |

== 19th Annual Henry Awards ==
The 19th Annual Henry Awards were presented on July 28, 2025 at the Lone Tree Arts Center for the 2024-2025 season.

The 2024-2025 Henry Award winners were:

| Category | Winner |
| Outstanding Production of a Play | Downstate, Curious Theatre Company |
| Outstanding Production of a Musical | Come From Away, Rocky Mountain Repertory Theatre |
| Outstanding Direction of a Play | Rick Barbour, Grounded, Boulder Ensemble Theatre Company (BETC) |
| Outstanding Direction of a Musical | Jeff Duke, Come from Away, Rocky Mountain Repertory Theatre |
| Outstanding Musical Direction | Michael Querio, The Music Man, Rocky Mountain Repertory Theatre |
| Outstanding Lead Performance in a Play (Tier 1) | Anne Penner, Grounded, Boulder Ensemble Theatre Company (BETC) Rosa Isabella Salvatierra, I Am Not Your Perfect Mexican Daughter, DCPA Theatre Company |
| Outstanding Lead Performance in a Play (Tier 2) | Miranda Byers, Perfect Arrangement, Firehouse Theater Company Wendy Ishii, The Trip to Bountiful, Bas Bleu Theatre Company Johnathan Underwood, Blues for an Alabama Sky, Firehouse Theater Company |
| Outstanding Lead Performance in a Musical (Tier 1) | Shabazz Green, A Gentleman’s Guide to Love and Murder, Arvada Center for the Arts and Humanities Luiza Vitucci, Come From Away, Rocky Mountain Repertory Theatre |
| Outstanding Lead Performance in a Musical (Tier 2) | Clark Destin Jones, Hedwig and the Angry Inch, Give 5 Productions Jennasea Pearce, Joseph and the Amazing Technicolor Dreamcoat, Performance Now Theatre Company |
| Outstanding Featured Performance in a Play (Tier 1) | Isaiah Tyrelle Boyd, The Hot Wing King, DCPA Theatre Company Leslie Sophia Pérez, I Am Not Your Perfect Mexican Daughter, DCPA Theatre Company |
| Outstanding Featured Performance in a Play (Tier 2) | Heather Ostberg Johnson, The 39 Steps, OpenStage Theatre & Company Kelly Uhlenhopp, Perfect Arrangement, Firehouse Theater Company |
| Outstanding Featured Performance in a Musical (Tier 1) | Will Branner, Little Shop of Horrors, DCPA Theatre Company Mitchell Lewis, The Music Man, Rocky Mountain Repertory Theatre |
| Outstanding Featured Performance in a Musical (Tier 2) | Jennifer Burnett, Cabaret, Platte Valley Theatre Arts Jessica Sotwick, Sweeney Todd, StageDoor Theatre |
| Outstanding Ensemble Performance | Come From Away, Rocky Mountain Repertory Theatre |
| Outstanding Choreography | Jennifer Lupp, Come From Away, Rocky Mountain Repertory Theatre |
| Outstanding New Play or Musical - World Premiere | The Reservoir, by Jake Brasch, DCPA Theatre Company |
| Outstanding Costume Design (Tier 1) | Kevin Copenhaver, A Gentleman’s Guide to Love and Murder, Arvada Center for the Arts and Humanities |
| Outstanding Costume Design (Tier 2) | Susan Rahmsdorff-Terry, Joseph and the Amazing Technicolor Dreamcoat, Performance Now Theatre Company |
| Outstanding Lighting Design (Tier 1) | Vance McKenzie, National Bohemians, Miners Alley Performing Arts Center |
| Outstanding Lighting Design (Tier 2) | Brett Maughan, Hedwig and the Angry Inch, Give 5 Productions Vance McKenzie, Joseph and the Amazing Technicolor Dreamcoat, Performance Now Theatre Company |
| Outstanding Scenic Design (Tier 1) | Tony Cisek, The Hot Wing King, DCPA Theatre Company |
| Outstanding Scenic Design (Tier 2) | Andrew Bates, Joseph and the Amazing Technicolor Dreamcoat, Performance Now Theatre Company |
| Outstanding Sound Design (Tier 1) | John Hauser, National Bohemians, Miners Alley Performing Arts Center |
| Outstanding Sound Design (Tier 2) | Brendan O’Hara, Every Christmas Story Ever Told (And Then Some!), Breckenridge Backstage Theatre Kitty Robbins, On Clover Road, Springs Ensemble Theatre |
| Lifetime Achievement Award | KQ, Artistic Director, Magic Moments, Inc. |

== 18th Annual Henry Awards ==
The 18th Annual Henry Awards were presented on July 29, 2024 at the Lone Tree Arts Center for the 2023-2024 season.

The 2023-2024 Henry Award winners were:

| Category | Winner |
| Outstanding Production of a Play | Endgame, Thunder River Theatre Company |
| Outstanding Production of a Musical | A Little Night Music, DCPA Theatre Company |
| Outstanding Direction of a Play | Margot Bordelon, The Lehman Trilogy, DCPA Theatre Company |
| Outstanding Direction of a Musical | Chris Coleman, A Little Night Music, DCPA Theatre Company Lynne Collins, Beautiful: The Carole King Musical, Arvada Center for the Arts and Humanities |
| Outstanding Musical Direction | David Nehls, Natasha, Pierre & the Great Comet of 1812, Arvada Center for the Arts and Humanities |
| Outstanding Lead Actor in a Play (Tier 1) | Brian Landis Folkins, Endgame, Thunder River Theatre Company |
| Outstanding Lead Actor in a Play (Tier 2) | Kent-Jameson Ehrman, Inventing Van Gogh, Breckenridge Backstage Theatre Steve Emily, Annapurna, Springs Ensemble Theatre |
| Outstanding Lead Actress in a Play (Tier 1) | Emma Messenger, Misery, Miners Alley Playhouse |
| Outstanding Lead Actress in a Play (Tier 2) | Anne Oberbroeckling, The Heartbeat of the Sun, Cherry Creek Theatre |
| Outstanding Lead Actor in a Musical (Tier 1) | Edward Staudenmayer, A Little Night Music, DCPA Theatre Company |
| Outstanding Lead Actor in a Musical (Tier 2) | Keith J. Warren, A Gentleman’s Guide to Love and Murder, Breckenridge Backstage Theatre |
| Outstanding Lead Actress in a Musical (Tier 1) | Emily Van Fleet, Beautiful: The Carole King Musical, Arvada Center for the Arts and Humanities |
| Outstanding Lead Actress in a Musical (Tier 2) | Carolyn Lohr, The Music Man, Performance Now Theatre Company |
| Outstanding Supporting Actor in a Play (Tier 1) | Andrew Uhlenhopp, Art, Aurora Fox Arts Center |
| Outstanding Supporting Actor in a Play (Tier 2) | Felix Mayes, Inventing Van Gogh, Breckenridge Backstage Theatre |
| Outstanding Supporting Actress in a Play (Tier 1) | Anastasia Davidson, Coal Country, BETC |
| Outstanding Supporting Actress in a Play (Tier 2) | Erin Rollman, 125 ‘NO’s, Buntport Theater Company |
| Outstanding Supporting Actor in a Musical (Tier 1) | Lawrence Flowers, Dreamgirls, Lone Tree Arts Center |
| Outstanding Supporting Actor in a Musical (Tier 2) | Vern Moody, Man of La Mancha, Platte Valley Players Theatre George Zamarripa, Man of La Mancha, Platte Valley Players Theatre |
| Outstanding Supporting Actress in a Musical (Tier 1) | Cate Hayman, A Little Night Music, DCPA Theatre Company |
| Outstanding Supporting Actress in a Musical (Tier 2) | Jennifer Burnett, The Music Man, Performance Now Theatre Company |
| Outstanding Ensemble Performance | The Lehman Trilogy, DCPA Theatre Company |
| Outstanding Choreography | Jessica Hindsley, Rodgers and Hammerstein's Cinderella, Arvada Center for the Arts and Humanities Kelly Van Oosbree, The Music Man, Performance Now Theatre Company |
| Outstanding New Play or Musical | Mountain Octopus,Written by Beth Kander, Creede Repertory Theatre Truth Be Told, Written by William Cameron, Curious Theatre Company Rubicon, Written by Kirsten Potter, DCPA Theatre Company |
| Outstanding Costume Design (Tier 1) | Sarah M. Stark, Natasha, Pierre & the Great Comet of 1812, Arvada Center for the Arts and Humanities |
| Outstanding Costume Design (Tier 2) | Rebecca Evans, The Book of Will, OpenStage Theatre & Company |
| Outstanding Lighting Design (Tier 1) | Vance McKenzie, Misery, Miners Alley Playhouse |
| Outstanding Lighting Design (Tier 2) | Maxwell O’Neill, Clink, Clink, Two Cent Lion Theatre Company |
| Outstanding Scenic Design (Tier 1) | Christopher L. Sheley, Misery, Colorado Springs Fine Arts Center at Colorado College |
| Outstanding Scenic Design (Tier 2) | Susan Crabtree, You Enjoy Myself, Local Theater Company |
| Outstanding Sound Design (Tier 1) | John Hauser, Misery, Miners Alley Playhouse |
| Outstanding Sound Design (Tier 2) | Kevin Douglas and Taelor Hansen, Clink, Clink, Two Cent Lion Theatre Company |
| Outstanding Youth Performer | Ethan Hershman, The Music Man, Performance Now Theatre Company Nicole Siegler, All Shook Up, Town Hall Arts Center |
| Lifetime Achievement Award | Sue Leiser |

== 17th Annual Henry Awards ==
The 17th Annual Henry Awards were presented on July 24, 2023 at the Denver Center for the Performing Arts for the 2022-2023 season.

The 2022-2023 Henry Award winners were:

| Category | Winner |
| Outstanding Production of a Play | The Royale, BETC |
| Outstanding Production of a Musical | Into the Woods, Arvada Center for the Arts and Humanities |
| Outstanding Direction of a Play | Jada Suzanne Dixon, The Royale, BETC |
| Outstanding Direction of a Musical | Hunter Foster, Jersey Boys, Theatre Aspen |
| Outstanding Musical Direction | Jordan Ortman, Disney’s Beauty and the Beast, Arvada Center for the Arts and Humanities |
| Outstanding Lead Actor in a Play (Tier 1) | Geoffrey Kent, Much Ado About Nothing, DCPA Theatre Company |
| Outstanding Lead Actor in a Play (Tier 2) | Lavour Addison, The Royale, BETC |
| Outstanding Lead Actress in a Play (Tier 1) | Dana Green, Much Ado About Nothing, DCPA Theatre Company |
| Outstanding Lead Actress in a Play (Tier 2) | Jessica Robblee, The Belle of Amherst, Clover & Bee Productions |
| Outstanding Lead Actor in a Musical (Tier 1) | Mitchell Lewis, Jersey Boys, Rocky Mountain Repertory Theatre |
| Outstanding Lead Actor in a Musical (Tier 2) | Miracle Myles, Footloose, Give 5 Productions and Parker Arts Jeremy Rill, Footloose, Give 5 Productions and Parker Arts |
| Outstanding Lead Actress in a Musical (Tier 1) | Maiesha McQueen, The Color Purple, DCPA Theatre Company |
| Outstanding Lead Actress in a Musical (Tier 2) | GerRee Hinshaw, Raised on Ronstadt, Local Theater Company |
| Outstanding Supporting Actor in a Play (Tier 1) | Sammy Gleason, It's A Wonderful Life - A Live Radio Play, Fine Arts Center Theatre Company at Colorado College Michael Lee, It's A Wonderful Life - A Live Radio Play, Fine Arts Center Theatre Company at Colorado College |
| Outstanding Supporting Actor in a Play (Tier 2) | Cris Davenport, The Royale, BETC |
| Outstanding Supporting Actress in a Play (Tier 1) | Alexis B. Santiago, Quixote Nuevo, DCPA Theatre Company |
| Outstanding Supporting Actress in a Play (Tier 2) | Sarah Sheppard Shaver, The Revolutionists, Springs Ensemble Theatre Alicia “Lisa” Young, The Royale, BETC |
| Outstanding Supporting Actor in a Musical (Tier 1) | Colin Alexander, Disney's Beauty and the Beast, Arvada Center for the Arts and Humanities |
| Outstanding Supporting Actor in a Musical (Tier 2) | Jeffrey Parker, Peter and the Starcatcher, Cherry Creek Theatre Carter Edward Smith, Footloose, Give 5 Productions and Parker Arts |
| Outstanding Supporting Actress in a Musical (Tier 1) | Adriane Leigh Robinson, Damn Yankees, Arvada Center for the Arts and Humanities |
| Outstanding Supporting Actress in a Musical (Tier 2) | Danielle Hermon, Sound of Music, Sasquatch Productions |
| Outstanding Ensemble Performance | The Royale, BETC |
| Outstanding Choreography | Jessica Hindsley, Disney's Beauty and the Beast, Arvada Center for the Arts and Humanities |
| Outstanding New Play or Musical | Hotter Than Egypt, written by Yussef El Guindi, DCPA Theatre Company |
| Outstanding Costume Design (Tier 1) | Helen Q. Huang, Quixote Nuevo, DCPA Theatre Company |
| Outstanding Costume Design (Tier 2) | Sarah Zinn, The Royale, BETC |
| Outstanding Lighting Design (Tier 1) | Pablo Santiago, Quixote Nuevo, DCPA Theatre Company |
| Outstanding Lighting Design (Tier 2) | Emily A. Maddox, The Royale, BETC |
| Outstanding Scenic Design (Tier 1) | Efren Degadillo, Jr., Quixote Nuevo, DCPA Theatre Company Brian Mallgrave, Disney's Beauty and the Beast, Arvada Center for the Arts and Humanities |
| Outstanding Scenic Design (Tier 2) | Colin Tugwell, You Can't Take It With You, Thunder River Theatre Company |
| Outstanding Sound Design (Tier 1) | David R. Molina, Hotter Than Egypt, DCPA Theatre Company |
| Outstanding Sound Design (Tier 2) | Cece Smith, The Royale, BETC |
| Outstanding Youth Performer | Jackson Baldwin, A Fairy Tale Christmas Carol, Steel City Theatre Company Jacob L. Johnson, A Christmas Story, Breckenridge Backstage Theatre Nolan McDowell, The Addams Family, Sasquatch Productions |
| Lifetime Achievement Award | Jeffrey Wayne Nickelson |

== 16th Annual Henry Awards ==
The 16th Annual Henry Awards were presented on July 25, 2022 at the Arvada Center for the Arts and Humanities for the 2021-2022 season.

The 2021-2022 Henry Award winners were:

| Category | Winner |
| Outstanding Production of a Play | Guadalupe in the Guest Room, Colorado Springs Fine Arts Center at Colorado College |
| Outstanding Production of a Musical | Kinky Boots, Arvada Center for the Arts and Humanities Rattlesnake Kate, DCPA Theatre Company, |
| Outstanding Direction of a Play | James Bruenger-Arreguin, Guadalupe in the Guest Room, Colorado Springs Fine Arts Center at Colorado College |
| Outstanding Direction of a Musical | Chris Coleman, Rattlesnake Kate, DCPA Theatre Company |
| Outstanding Musical Direction | Mark G. Meadows, Choir Boy, DCPA Theatre Company |
| Outstanding Lead Actor in a Play (Tier 1) | Jihad Milhem, The Crucible, Miners Alley Playhouse |
| Outstanding Lead Actor in a Play (Tier 2) | Jacob Dresch, It's a Wonderful Life: A Live Radio Play, Breckenridge Backstage Theatre |
| Outstanding Lead Actress in a Play (Tier 1) | Elise Santora, Guadalupe in the Guest Room, Colorado Springs Fine Arts Center at Colorado College |
| Outstanding Lead Actress in a Play (Tier 2) | A. Lee Massaro, Sisters In Law, Theatre Or |
| Outstanding Lead Actor in a Musical (Tier 1) | Esteban Suero, Rattlesnake Kate, DCPA Theatre Company |
| Outstanding Lead Actor in a Musical (Tier 2) | Bernie Cardell, The Drowsy Chaperone, Performance Now Theatre Company |
| Outstanding Lead Actress in a Musical (Tier 1) | Alyse Alan Louis, Rattlesnake Kate, DCPA Theatre Company |
| Outstanding Lead Actress in a Musical (Tier 2) | Emma Rebecca Maxfield, The Drowsy Chaperone, Performance Now Theatre Company |
| Outstanding Supporting Actor in a Play (Tier 1) | Matthew Hancock, In the Upper Room, DCPA Theatre Company |
| Outstanding Supporting Actor in a Play (Tier 2) | Brian Colonna, <3 Richard, Buntport Theater |
| Outstanding Supporting Actress in a Play (Tier 1) | Rebecca Myers, By the Way, Meet Vera Stark, Colorado Springs Fine Arts Center at Colorado College |
| Outstanding Supporting Actress in a Play (Tier 2) | Erin Rollman, <3 Richard, Buntport Theater |
| Outstanding Supporting Actor in a Musical (Tier 1) | Matthew Bryan Feld, Rattlesnake Kate, DCPA Theatre Company |
| Outstanding Supporting Actor in a Musical (Tier 2) | Jeffrey Parker, The Drowsy Chaperone, Performance Now Theatre Company |
| Outstanding Supporting Actress in a Musical (Tier 1) | Neyla Pekarek, Rattlesnake Kate, DCPA Theatre Company |
| Outstanding Supporting Actress in a Musical (Tier 2) | Nancy Evans Begley, The Drowsy Chaperone, Performance Now Theatre Company |
| Outstanding Ensemble Performance | Guadalupe in the Guest Room, Colorado Springs Fine Arts Center at Colorado College |
| Outstanding Choreography | Dominique Kelley, Rattlesnake Kate, DCPA Theatre Company |
| Outstanding New Play or Musical | Rattlesnake Kate, written by Neyla Pekarek and Karen Hartman, DCPA Theatre Company |
| Outstanding Costume Design (Tier 1) | Nicole Watts, Kinky Boots, Arvada Center for the Arts and Humanities |
| Outstanding Costume Design (Tier 2) | Rebecca Spafford, Agatha Christie's Murder on the Orient Express, OpenStage Theatre & Company |
| Outstanding Lighting Design (Tier 1) | Charles R. MacLeod, In the Upper Room, DCPA Theatre Company |
| Outstanding Lighting Design (Tier 2) | Brett Maughan, The Drowsy Chaperone, Performance Now Theatre Company |
| Outstanding Scenic Design (Tier 1) | Efren Delgadillo Jr., In the Upper Room, DCPA Theatre Company |
| Outstanding Scenic Design (Tier 2) | Kelsey Colwell, It's a Wonderful Life: A Live Radio Play, Breckenridge Backstage Theatre |
| Outstanding Sound Design (Tier 1) | Jeff Gardner, In the Upper Room, DCPA Theatre Company |
| Outstanding Sound Design (Tier 2) | Riley Goossen, It's a Wonderful Life: A Live Radio Play, Breckenridge Backstage Theatre |
| Outstanding Youth Performer | Evan Duncan, Once on This Island, Town Hall Arts Center Nathaniel Waite-Lutz, A Very Merry Unauthorized Children’s Scientology Pageant, Aurora Fox Arts Center |
| Lifetime Achievement Award | Lucy M. Walker, the founder of EDEN Theatrical Workshop. The founders of Phamaly Theatre Company, Gregg Vigil, Teri Westerman Wagner, Kathleen Traylor, Kevin Ahl and Richard Britton. |

== 2020 to 2021 Pause ==
The Colorado Theatre Guild briefly paused show adjudications and judging from March 2020 through April 2021 as live performances remained largely shut down due to the COVID pandemic.

== 15th Annual Henry Awards ==
Presented in an online ceremony due to the COVID-19 pandemic on July 26, 2020.

Previous Henrys seasons ran from June 1 through May 31. With the pandemic the 2020 season, the Henrys Season closed on March 31. Because of the shortened theatre season no special awards or Lifetime Achievement Awards were presented.

| Category | Winner |
| Outstanding Production of a Play | The Curious Incident of the Dog In The Night-Time, Fine Arts Center Theatre Company at Colorado College |
| Outstanding Production of a Musical | The Bridges of Madison County, Fine Arts Center Theatre Company at Colorado College |
| Outstanding Direction of a Play | donnie l. betts, The Mountaintop, Theatreworks |
| Outstanding Direction of a Musical | Nathan Halvorson, The Bridges of Madison County, Fine Arts Center Theatre Company at Colorado College |
| Outstanding Musical Direction | Stephanie McGuffin, The Bridges of Madison County, Fine Arts Center Theatre Company at Colorado College |
| Outstanding Lead Actor in a Play | Logan Riley Bruner, The Curious Incident of the Dog In The Night-Time, Fine Arts Center Theatre Company at Colorado College |
| Outstanding Lead Actress in a Play | Marisa D. Hébert, The Mountaintop, Theatreworks |
| Outstanding Lead Actor in a Musical | Perry Davis Harper, Jekyll & Hyde, Thingamajig Theatre Company |
| Outstanding Lead Actress in a Musical | Jennifer DeDominici, The Bridges of Madison County, Fine Arts Center Theatre Company at Colorado College |
| Outstanding Supporting Actor in a Play | Chris Kendall, Tuesdays with Morrie, Cherry Creek Theatre |
| Outstanding Supporting Actress in a Play | Marisa D. Hébert, Tiny Beautiful Things, Fine Arts Center Theatre Company at Colorado College |
| Outstanding Supporting Actor in a Musical | Jeff Roark, The Bridges of Madison County, Fine Arts Center Theatre Company at Colorado College |
| Outstanding Supporting Actress in a Musical | Annie Dwyer, Cabaret, Town Hall Arts Center |
| Outstanding Ensemble Performance | The Mountaintop, Theateworks |
| Outstanding Choreography | Christopher Page-Sanders, The Scottsboro Boys, Vintage Theatre |
| Outstanding New Play or Musical | Hazardous Materials, written by Beth Kander, Creede Repertory Theatre |
| Outstanding Costume Design (Tier 1) | Meghan Anderson Doyle, A Doll’s House, DCPA Theatre Company |
| Outstanding Costume Design (Tier 2) | Buntport Theater, Universe 92, Buntport Theater Suzanne Couch, Noises Off, StageDoor Theatre Nancy Hankin, The Great American Trailer Park Musical, Mountain Repertory Theatre Company at the Butte Theater |
| Outstanding Lighting Design (Tier 1) | Holly Anne Rawls, The Curious Incident of the Dog In The Night-Time, Fine Arts Center Theatre Company at Colorado College |
| Outstanding Lighting Design (Tier 2) | Sean Jeffries, A View From the Bridge, Thunder River Theatre Company |
| Outstanding Scenic Design (Tier 1) | Lindsay Fuori, Hazardous Materials, Creede Repertory Theatre Charles Packard, The Mountaintop, Theatreworks |
| Outstanding Scenic Design (Tier 2) | Dean Arniotes, Noises Off, StageDoor Theatre |
| Outstanding Sound Design (Tier 1) | Jacob Keough-Mishler, The Bridges of Madison County, Fine Arts Center Theatre Company at Colorado College |
| Outstanding Sound Design (Tier 2) | Buntport Theater, Universe 92, Buntport Theater |

== 14th Annual Henry Awards ==
Presented on July 22, 2019 at the Lone Tree Arts Center for the 2018-2019 season.

The 2018-2019 Henry Award winners were:

| Category | Winner |
| Outstanding Season for a Theatre Company | Fine Arts Center Theatre Company at Colorado College |
| Outstanding Production of a Play | Church & State, Fine Arts Center Theatre Company at Colorado College |
| Outstanding Production of a Musical | Oklahoma!, DCPA Theatre Company |
| Outstanding Direction of a Play | Rebecca Martinez, Anna in the Tropics, Fine Arts Center Theatre Company at Colorado College Christy Montour-Larson, The Diary of Anne Frank, Arvada Center for the Arts and Humanities |
| Outstanding Direction of a Musical | Chris Coleman, Oklahoma!, DCPA Theatre Company |
| Outstanding Musical Direction | Eric Alsford, Ragtime, Theatre Aspen |
| Outstanding Lead Actor in a Play | Brian Landis Folkins, Church & State, Fine Arts Center Theatre Company at Colorado College Owen O’Farrell, Of Mice and Men, Thunder River Theatre Company |
| Outstanding Lead Actress in a Play | Elise Santora, Anna in the Tropics, Fine Arts Center Theatre Company at Colorado College Missy Moore, The Pink Unicorn, And Toto Too Theatre Company |
| Outstanding Lead Actor in a Musical | Antoine L. Smith, Oklahoma!, DCPA Theatre Company |
| Outstanding Lead Actress in a Musical | Mary Louise Lee, Caroline, or Change, Aurora Fox Arts Center |
| Outstanding Supporting Actor in a Play | Kevin Hart, Lend Me a Tenor, Breckenridge Backstage Theatre |
| Outstanding Supporting Actress in a Play | Brittany Dye, Equus, Thunder River Theatre Company |
| Outstanding Supporting Actor in a Musical | Rennie Anthony Magee, Oklahoma!, DCPA Theatre Company |
| Outstanding Supporting Actress in a Musical | Bre Jackson, Oklahoma!, DCPA Theatre Company |
| Outstanding Ensemble Performance | Oklahoma!, DCPA Theatre Company |
| Outstanding Choreography | Dominique Kelley, Oklahoma!, DCPA Theatre Company |
| Outstanding New Play or Musical | Paper Cut, written by Andrew Rosendorf, Local Theater Company |
| Outstanding Costume Design (Tier 1) | Kevin Brainerd, Ragtime, Theatre Aspen Jeff Cone, Anna Karenina, DCPA Theatre Company |
| Outstanding Costume Design (Tier 2) | Madeline Miles & Colin Tugwell, Equus, Thunder River Theatre Company |
| Outstanding Lighting Design (Tier 1) | Paul Black, Ragtime, Theatre Aspen |
| Outstanding Lighting Design (Tier 2) | Sean Jeffries, Equus, Thunder River Theatre Company |
| Outstanding Scenic Design (Tier 1) | Caitlin Ayer, You Can’t Take It With You, Colorado Shakespeare Festival |
| Outstanding Scenic Design (Tier 2) | Brian Miller, The Waverly Gallery, Bas Bleu Theatre |
| Outstanding Sound Design (Tier 1) | Jason Ducat, The Diary of Anne Frank, Arvada Center for the Arts and Humanities |
| Outstanding Sound Design (Tier 2) | Peter Anthony, Frankenstein, OpenStage Theatre & Company |
| Lifetime Achievement Award | Beki Pineda |
| Excellence in Children’s Theatre | Denver Children’s Theatre at the Mizel Arts & Culture Center |

== 13th Annual Henry Awards ==
Presented on July 23, 2018 at the Lone Tree Arts Center for the 2017-2018 season.

The 2017-2018 Henry Award winners were:

| Category | Winner |
| Outstanding Season for a Theatre Company | Arvada Center for the Arts and Humanities |
| Outstanding Production of a Play | Sense and Sensibility, Arvada Center for the Arts and Humanities |
| Outstanding Production of a Musical | Fun Home, Miners Alley Playhouse |
| Outstanding Direction of a Play | Lynne Collins, Sense and Sensibility, Arvada Center for the Arts and Humanities |
| Outstanding Direction of a Musical | Len Matheo, Fun Home, Miners Alley Playhouse |
| Outstanding Musical Direction | Mitch Samu, Fun Home, Miners Alley Playhouse |
| Outstanding Lead Actor in a Play | Chris Kendall, District Merchants, Miners Alley Playhouse |
| Outstanding Lead Actress in a Play | Erin Rollman, The Book Handlers, Buntport Theater |
| Outstanding Lead Actor in a Musical | Jake Mendes, Hedwig and the Angry Inch, Aurora Fox Arts Center |
| Outstanding Lead Actress in a Musical | Jalyn Courtenay Webb, Always...Patsy Cline, Midtown Arts Center |
| Outstanding Supporting Actor in a Play | Bob Moore, The Price, Thunder River Theatre Company |
| Outstanding Supporting Actress in a Play | Emma Messenger, Mud Blue Sky, The Edge Theater Company |
| Outstanding Supporting Actor in a Musical | Brandon Bill, Hairspray, Inspire Creative & Parker Arts |
| Outstanding Supporting Actress in a Musical | Sophia Dotson, Fun Home, Miners Alley Playhouse |
| Outstanding Ensemble Performance | Sense and Sensibility, Arvada Center for the Arts and Humanities |
| Outstanding Choreography | Kitty Skillman Hilsabeck, Joseph and the Amazing Technicolor Dreamcoat, Arvada Center for the Arts and Humanities |
| Outstanding New Play or Musical | Colorism: Breaking the Chains of Complexion, written by Kenya Fashaw, 5280 Artists Coop The Great Leap, written by Lauren Yee, DCPA Theatre Company |
| Outstanding Costume Design (Tier 1) | Clare Henkel, Sunday in the Park with George, Arvada Center for the Arts and Humanities |
| Outstanding Costume Design (Tier 2) | Rebecca Spafford, The Crucible, OpenStage Theatre & Company |
| Outstanding Lighting Design (Tier 1) | Shannon McKinney, Sunday in the Park with George, Arvada Center for the Arts and Humanities Holly Rawls, Fun Home, Colorado Springs Fine Arts Center at Colorado College |
| Outstanding Lighting Design (Tier 2) | Brian Miller, The Crucible, OpenStage Theatre & Company |
| Outstanding Scenic Design (Tier 1) | Brian Mallgrave, Joseph and the Amazing Technicolor Dreamcoat, Arvada Center for the Arts and Humanities |
| Outstanding Scenic Design (Tier 2) | Ed Haynes, Fences, Lone Tree Arts Center |
| Outstanding Sound Design (Tier 1) | Torri Higgins, Fun Home, Colorado Springs Fine Arts Center at Colorado College |
| Outstanding Sound Design (Tier 2) | Justin Babcock, Fun Home, Miners Alley Playhouse |
| Lifetime Achievement Award | Wendy Ishii |

== 12th Annual Henry Awards ==
Presented on July 17, 2017 at the PACE Center for the 2016-2017 season.

The 2016-2017 Henry Award winners were:

| Category | Winner |
| Outstanding Season for a Theatre Company | OpenStage Theatre and Company |
| Outstanding Production of a Play | The Game of Love and Chance, TheatreWorks |
| Outstanding Production of a Musical | Evita, Lone Tree Arts Center |
| Outstanding Direction of a Play | Dulcie Willis, August: Osage County, OpenStage Theatre & Company |
| Outstanding Direction of a Musical | LScott RC Levy, Man of La Mancha, Colorado Springs Fine Arts Center Theatre Company |
| Outstanding Musical Direction | Max Mamon, Evita, Lone Tree Arts Center |
| Outstanding Lead Actor in a Play | Steven P. Sickles, Le Bete, OpenStage Theatre & Company |
| Outstanding Lead Actress in a Play | Sydney Parks Smith, August: Osage County, OpenStage Theatre & Company |
| Outstanding Lead Actor in a Musical | Stephen Day, Man of La Mancha, Colorado Springs Fine Arts Center Theatre Company |
| Outstanding Lead Actress in a Musical | Colby Dunn, The Toxic Avenger, Breckenridge Backstage Theatre |
| Outstanding Supporting Actor in a Play | Triney Sandoval, The Book of Will, DCPA Theatre Company |
| Outstanding Supporting Actress in a Play | Miriam A. Laube, The Book of Will, DCPA Theatre Company |
| Outstanding Supporting Actor in a Musical | Matt LaFontaine, Jesus Christ Superstar, Arvada Center for the Arts and Humanities |
| Outstanding Supporting Actress in a Musical | Megan Van De Hey, The Toxic Avenger, Breckenridge Backstage Theatre |
| Outstanding Ensemble Performance | The Book of Will, DCPA Theatre Company |
| Outstanding Choreography | Matthew D. Peters, Joseph and the Amazing Technicolor Dreamcoat, BDT Stage |
| Outstanding New Play or Musical | The Book of Will, writtenby Lauren Gunderson, DCPA Theatre Company |
| Outstanding Costume Design (Tier 1) | Camille Assaf, The Book of Will, DCPA Theatre Company |
| Outstanding Costume Design (Tier 2) | Jesus Perez, The Little Mermaid, Rocky Mountain Repertory Theatre |
| Outstanding Lighting Design (Tier 1) | Holly Anne Rawls, Man of La Mancha, Colorado Springs Fine Arts Center Theatre Company |
| Outstanding Lighting Design (Tier 2) | Jen Kiser, Evita, Lone Tree Arts Center |
| Outstanding Scenic Design (Tier 1) | Christopher L. Sheley, Man of La Mancha, Colorado Springs Fine Arts Center Theatre Company |
| Outstanding Scenic Design (Tier 2) | Sean Jeffries, Dr. Jekyll and Mr. Hyde, Thunder River Theatre Company |
| Outstanding Sound Design (Tier 1) | Benjamin Heston, Man of La Mancha, Colorado Springs Fine Arts Center Theatre Company |
| Outstanding Sound Design (Tier 2) | Sean Jeffries, The Tempest, Thunder River Theatre Company |
| Lifetime Achievement Award | Ed Baierlein and Sallie Diamond |
| Outstanding Theatre Benefactors | Les Crispelle & Glenn Tiedt |
| Outstanding Improvisational Theatre | SCRIPTprov |
| Excellence in Special Makeup Effects | Todd Debreceni |

== 11th Annual Henry Awards ==
Presented on July 18, 2016 at the PACE Center for the 2015-2016 season.

The 2015-2016 Henry Award winners were:

| Category | Winner |
| Outstanding Season for a Theatre Company | Theatre Aspen |
| Outstanding Production of a Play | Rabbit Hole, Vintage Theatre Productions |
| Outstanding Production of a Musical | Cabaret, Theatre Aspen |
| Outstanding Direction of a Play | Sarna Lapine, Other Desert Cities, Theatre Aspen |
| Outstanding Direction of a Musical | Kent Thompson, Sweeney Todd, DCPA Theatre Company |
| Outstanding Musical Direction | Eric Alsford, Cabaret, Theatre Aspen |
| Outstanding Lead Actor in a Play | Jonathan Farwell, The Outgoing Tide, Bas Bleu Theatre Company |
| Outstanding Lead Actress in a Play | Missy Moore, Getting Out, The Edge Theater Company |
| Outstanding Lead Actor in a Musical | Jon Peterson, Cabaret, Theatre Aspen |
| Outstanding Lead Actress in a Musical | Linda Mugleston, Sweeney Todd, DCPA Theatre Company |
| Outstanding Supporting Actor in a Play | Marc Stith, Rabbit Hole, Vintage Theatre Productions |
| Outstanding Supporting Actress in a Play | Maggy Stacy, Rabbit Hole, Vintage Theatre Productions |
| Outstanding Supporting Actor in a Musical | Steven Sitzman, The Addams Family, Rocky Mountain Repertory Theatre |
| Outstanding Supporting Actress in a Musical | Lori Wilner, Cabaret, Theatre Aspen |
| Outstanding Ensemble Performance | Rabbit Hole, Vintage Theatre Productions |
| Outstanding Choreography | Mark Martino, Cabaret, Theatre Aspen |
| Outstanding New Play or Musical | The Rembrandt Room, written and produced by Buntport Theater |
| Outstanding Costume Design (Tier 1) | Kevin Copenhaver, Sweeney Todd, DCPA Theatre Company |
| Outstanding Costume Design (Tier 2) | Cindy Franke, Ragtime-The Musical, Performance Now Theatre Company |
| Outstanding Lighting Design (Tier 1) | Paul Black, Peter and the Starcatcher, Theatre Aspen |
| Outstanding Lighting Design (Tier 2) | Shannon McKinney, Faith, Local Theater Company |
| Outstanding Scenic Design (Tier 1) | Jim Kronzer, Sweeney Todd, DCPA Theatre Company |
| Outstanding Scenic Design (Tier 2) | Michael R. Duran, The Explorers Club, Lone Tree Arts Center |
| Outstanding Sound Design (Tier 1) | Craig Breitenbach, Tribes, DCPA Theatre Company |
| Outstanding Sound Design (Tier 2) | Jonathan Scott-McKean, Pump Boys and Dinettes, Miners Alley Playhouse |
| Lifetime Achievement Award | Deborah Persoff |
| Outstanding High School Educator | Melody Duggan |

== 10th Annual Henry Awards ==
Presented on July 22, 2015 at the Arvada Center for the Arts and Humanities for the 2014-2015 season.

The 2014-2015 Henry Award winners were:

| Category | Winner |
| Outstanding Season for a Theatre Company | DCPA Theatre Company |
| Outstanding Production of a Play | ‘Night, Mother, Vintage Theatre Productions |
| Outstanding Production of a Musical | The Unsinkable Molly Brown, DCPA Theatre Company |
| Outstanding Direction of a Play | Billie McBride, 'Night Mother, Vintage Theatre Productions |
| Outstanding Direction of a Musical | Kathleen Marshall, The Unsinkable Molly Brown, DCPA Theatre Company |
| Outstanding Musical Direction | Michael Rafter, The Unsinkable Molly Brown, DCPA Theatre Company |
| Outstanding Lead Actor in a Play | Mike Hartman, Benediction, DCPA Theatre Company |
| Outstanding Lead Actress in a Play | Emma Messenger, 'Night, Mother, Vintage Theatre Productions |
| Outstanding Lead Actor in a Musical | Wayne Kennedy, Fiddler on the Roof, BDT Stage |
| Outstanding Lead Actress in a Musical | Beth Malone, The Unsinkable Molly Brown, DCPA Theatre Company |
| Outstanding Supporting Actor in a Play | Benjamin Cowhick, Good Television, A & A Productions |
| Outstanding Supporting Actress in a Play | Billie McBride, Benediction, DCPA Theatre Company |
| Outstanding Supporting Actor in a Musical | Michael Wordly, Memphis, Midtown Arts Center |
| Outstanding Supporting Actress in a Musical | Annie Dwyer, Young Frankenstein, Town Hall Arts Center |
| Outstanding Ensemble Performance | Middle Aged People Sitting in Boxes, Buntport Theater |
| Outstanding Choreography | Kathleen Marshal, The Unsinkable Molly Brown, DCPA Theatre Company |
| Outstanding New Play or Musical | The 12, book and lyrics by Robert Schenkkan; music and lyrics by Neil Berg; produced by DCPA Theatre Company |
| Outstanding Costume Design (Tier 1) | Paul Tazewell, The Unsinkable Molly Brown, DCPA Theatre Company |
| Outstanding Costume Design (Tier 2) | Linda Morken, Mary Poppins, BDT Stage |
| Outstanding Lighting Design (Tier 1) | Donald Holder, The Unsinkable Molly Brown, DCPA Theatre Company |
| Outstanding Lighting Design (Tier 2) | Brett Maughan, Mary Poppins, BDT Stage |
| Outstanding Scenic Design (Tier 1) | Brian Mallgrave, She Loves Me, Arvada Center for the Arts and Humanities |
| Outstanding Scenic Design (Tier 2) | Christopher Waller, Jerusalem, The Edge Theater Company |
| Outstanding Sound Design (Tier 1) | David Thomas, Memphis, Arvada Center for the Arts and Humanities |
| Outstanding Sound Design (Tier 2) | Ren Manley, Jerusalem, The Edge Theater Company |
| Lifetime Achievement Award | Jo Bunton Keel |
| Outstanding Stage Management | Lisa Cook |

== 9th Annual Henry Awards ==
Presented on July 21, 2014 at the Arvada Center for the Arts and Humanities for the 2013-2014 season.

The 2013-2014 Henry Award winners were:

| Category | Winner |
| Outstanding Season for a Theatre Company | Denver Center Theatre Company |
| Outstanding Production of a Play | The Whipping Man, Curious Theatre Company |
| Outstanding Production of a Musical | Animal Crackers, Denver Center Theatre Company |
| Outstanding Direction of a Play | Kate Folkins & Chip Walton, The Whipping Man, Curious Theatre Company |
| Outstanding Direction of a Musical | Bruce K. Sevy, Animal Crackers, Denver Center Theatre Company |
| Outstanding Musical Direction | David Nehls, End of the Rainbow, Arvada Center for the Arts and Humanities |
| Outstanding Lead Actor in a Play | Cajardo Lindsey, The Whipping Man, Curious Theatre Company |
| Outstanding Lead Actress in a Play | Karen Slack, Painted Bread, Aurora Fox Theatre |
| Outstanding Lead Actor in a Musical | TJ Hogle, I Love You, You're Perfect, Now Change, Breckenridge Backstage Theatre |
| Outstanding Lead Actress in a Musical | Tari Kelly, End of the Rainbow, Arvada Center for the Arts and Humanities |
| Outstanding Supporting Actor in a Play | Laurence Curry, The Whipping Man, Curious Theatre Company |
| Outstanding Supporting Actress in a Play | Emma Messenger, The Beauty Queen of Leenane, The Edge Theater Company |
| Outstanding Supporting Actor in a Musical | Colin Alexander, Curtains, Arvada Center for the Arts and Humanities |
| Outstanding Supporting Actress in a Musical | Christine Rowan, Animal Crackers, Denver Center Theatre Company |
| Outstanding Ensemble Performance | The Whipping Man, Curious Theatre Company |
| Outstanding Choreography | Kelly Van Oosbree, Hairspray, Performance Now |
| Outstanding New Play or Musical | The Legend of Georgia McBride, by Matthew Lopez; produced by Denver Center Theatre Company |
| Outstanding Costume Design (Tier 1) | Dane Laffrey, The Legend of Georgia McBride, Denver Center Theatre Company |
| Outstanding Costume Design (Tier 2) | Rebecca Spafford, Dangerous Liaisons, OpenStage Theatre & Company |
| Outstanding Lighting Design (Tier 1) | Shannon McKinney, The Whipping Man, Curious Theatre Company |
| Outstanding Lighting Design (Tier 2) | Shannon McKinney, Painted Bread, Aurora Fox Theatre |
| Outstanding Scenic Design (Tier 1) | Markas Henry, The Whipping Man, Curious Theatre Company |
| Outstanding Scenic Design (Tier 2) | Charles Dean Packard, Metamorphoses, Aurora Fox Theatre |
| Outstanding Sound Design (Tier 1) | Brian Freeland, The Whipping Man, Curious Theatre Company |
| Outstanding Sound Design (Tier 2) | William Burns, Metamorphoses, Aurora Fox Theatre |
| Lifetime Achievement Award | Billie McBride |
| Outstanding Regional Theatre Award | Rocky Mountain Repertory Theatre |
| Special Award for Excellence in Educational Theatre | Rosey Waters and Imagination Makers |
| Special Award for Outstanding Puppet Artistry | Cory Gilstrap |

== 8th Annual Henry Awards ==
Presented on July 22, 2013 at the Arvada Center for the Arts and Humanities for the 2012-2013 season.

The 2012-2013 Henry Award winners were:

| Category | Winner |
| Outstanding Season for a Theatre Company | Curious Theatre Company |
| Outstanding Production of a Play | The Brothers Size, Curious Theatre Company |
| Outstanding Production of a Musical | Man of La Mancha, Arvada Center for the Arts and Humanities |
| Outstanding Direction of a Play | Robert Wells, The 39 Steps, Town Hall Arts Center |
| Outstanding Direction of a Musical | Rod A. Lansberry, Man of La Mancha. Arvada Center for the Arts and Humanities |
| Outstanding Musical Direction | David Nehls, Man of La Mancha, Arvada Center for the Arts and Humanities |
| Outstanding Lead Actor in a Play | Jonathan Farwell, Amadeus, OpenStage Theatre & Company |
| Outstanding Lead Actress in a Play | Laura Norman, Ghost-Writer, Boulder Ensemble Theatre Company |
| Outstanding Lead Actor in a Musical | Joshua Blanchard, Kiss of the Spider Woman, Lake Dillon Theater Company |
| Outstanding Lead Actress in a Musical | SuCh, The Color Purple, Aurora Fox Theatre |
| Outstanding Supporting Actor in a Play | Bob Moore, The Sunshine Boys, Lake Dillon Theatre Company |
| Outstanding Supporting Actress in a Play | Jeanne Paulsen, Romeo & Juliet, Denver Center Theatre Company |
| Outstanding Supporting Actor in a Musical | Thomas Rainey, Kiss of the Spider Woman, Lake Dillon Theater Company |
| Outstanding Supporting Actress in a Musical | Ruth Gottschall, Sense & Sensibility, The Musical, Denver Center Theatre Company |
| Outstanding Ensemble Performance | Hair, Town Hall Arts Center |
| Outstanding Choreography | Kitty Skillman Hilsabeck, Man of La Mancha, Arvada Center for the Arts and Humanities |
| Outstanding New Play or Musical | Sweet Tooth by Buntport Theater & Adam Stone, produced by Buntport Theater |
| Outstanding Costume Design (Tier 1) | Chris Campbell, Man of La Mancha, Arvada Center for the Arts and Humanities |
| Outstanding Costume Design (Tier 2) | Linda Morken, The Wizard of Oz, Boulder's Dinner Theatre |
| Outstanding Lighting Design (Tier 1) | Shannon McKinney, Man of La Mancha, Arvada Center for the Arts and Humanities |
| Outstanding Lighting Design (Tier 2) | Jacob M. Welch, Kiss of the Spider Woman, Lake Dillon Theatre Company |
| Outstanding Scenic Design (Tier 1) | Brian Mallgrave, Man of La Mancha, Arvada Center for the Arts and Humanities |
| Outstanding Scenic Design (Tier 2) | Abster Productions, August: Osage County, Abster Productions |
| Outstanding Sound Design (Tier 1) | Brian Freeland, The Elaborate Entrance of Chad Deity, Curious Theatre Company |
| Outstanding Sound Design (Tier 2) | Adam Stone, Wake, Buntport Theater |
| Lifetime Achievement Award | Jim Hunt |
| Outstanding Regional Theatre Award | TheatreWorks |
| Outstanding Volunteer | Randy Dipnet |
| Advocate for Theatre Arts Education | Colorado State Thespians |

== 7th Annual Henry Awards ==
Presented on July 16, 2012 at the L2 Arts & CultureCenter for the 2011-2012 season.

The 2011-2012 Henry Award winners were:

| Category | Winner |
| Outstanding Season for a Theatre Company | Arvada Center |
| Outstanding Production of a Play | Red, Curious Theatre Company |
| Outstanding Production of a Musical | Ragtime, Arvada Center |
| Outstanding Direction of a Play | Christy Montour-Larson, Red, Curious Theatre Company |
| Outstanding Direction of a Musical | Nick Sugar, The Who's Tommy, Town Hall Arts Center |
| Outstanding Musical Direction | Donna K. Debreceni, The Who's Tommy, Town Hall Arts Center, |
| Outstanding Lead Actor in a Play | Sean Scrutchins, 9 Circles, Curious Theatre Company, |
| Outstanding Lead Actress in a Play | Lisa Bruneau, Heartbreak House, Denver Center Theatre Company |
| Outstanding Lead Actor in a Musical | Tally Sessions, Chess, Arvada Center |
| Outstanding Lead Actress in a Musical | Megan Van de Hey, Ragtime, Arvada Center |
| Outstanding Supporting Actor in a Play | Benjamin Bonenfant, Red, Curious Theatre Company |
| Outstanding Supporting Actress in a Play | Erin Rollman, The Roast Beef Situation, Buntport Theater, Hannah Duggan, Tommy Lee Jones Goes to the Opera Alone, Buntport Theater, |
| Outstanding Supporting Actor in a Musical | Seth Caikowski, The Drowsy Chaperone, Boulder's Dinner Theatre |
| Outstanding Supporting Actress in a Musical | Arlene Rapal, Avenue Q, Vintage Theatre Productions |
| Outstanding Ensemble Performance | Red, Curious Theatre Company |
| Outstanding Choreography | Nick Sugar, The Who's Tommy,Town Hall Arts Center |
| Outstanding New Play or Musical | Tommy Lee Jones Goes to the Opera Alone, Buntport Theater |
| Outstanding Costume Design | Christina Wright, American Night, Denver Center Theatre Company |
| Outstanding Lighting Design | Shannon McKinney, Red, Curious Theatre Company |
| Outstanding Scenic Design | Susan Crabtree, Red, Curious Theatre Company |
| Outstanding Sound Design | Will Burns, Red, Curious Theatre Company |
| Lifetime Achievement Award | Tom McNally |
| Outstanding Regional Theatre Award | Thunder River Theatre Company |
| Journalist Excellence in the Arts | John Moore |
| Outstanding Multi-media Presentation | Charlie Miller |

== 6th Annual Henry Awards ==
Presented on July 18, 2011 at the Denver Center for the Performing Arts for the 2010-2011 season.

The 2010-2011 Henry Award winners were:

| Category | Winner |
| Outstanding Season for a Theatre Company | Denver Center Theatre Company |
| Outstanding Production of a Play | Ruined, Denver Center Theatre Company |
| Outstanding Production of a Musical | Rent, Town Hall Arts Center |
| Outstanding Direction of a Play | Kafka On Ice, Buntport Theater, Buntport Theater |
| Outstanding Direction of a Musical | Steve Wilson, Beauty and the Beast, PHAMALY |
| Outstanding Musical Direction | Donna Debreceni and Mary Dailey, Chicago, Town Hall Arts Center |
| Outstanding Lead Actor in a Play | Jake Walker, The Pride, Paragon Theatre Company |
| Outstanding Lead Actress in a Play | Kim Staunton, Ruined, Denver Center Theatre Company |
| Outstanding Lead Actor in a Musical | Nick Sugar, Hedwig and the Angry Inch, Avenue Theater |
| Outstanding Lead Actress in a Musical | Megan Van de Hey, Grey Gardens, Vintage Theatre Productions |
| Outstanding Supporting Actor in a Play | Pun Bandhu, The Catch, Denver Center Theatre Company |
| Outstanding Supporting Actress in a Play | Erin Rollman, Kafka On Ice, Buntport Theater |
| Outstanding Supporting Actor in a Musical | Stephen Day, Sunset Boulevard, Arvada Center |
| Outstanding Supporting Actress in a Musical | Tracy Warren, Hello Dolly, Boulder's Dinner Theatre |
| Outstanding Ensemble Performance | Kafka On Ice, Buntport Theater |
| Outstanding Choreography | Kelly Van Oosbree, The Music Man, Performance Now Theatre Company |
| Outstanding New Play or Musical | The Catch, written by Ken Weitzman, produced by Denver Center Theatre Company |
| Outstanding Costume Design | Cindy Franke, The Music Man, Performance Now Theatre Company |
| Outstanding Lighting Design | Jane Spencer, House of Spirits, Denver Center Theatre Company |
| Outstanding Scenic Design | Michael Ganio, Ruined, Denver Center Theatre Company |
| Outstanding Sound Design | Jane Shaw, The Catch, Denver Center Theatre Company |
| Lifetime Achievement Award | Joey Wishnia |
| Outstanding Regional Theatre Award | OpenStage Theatre & Company |
| Outstanding Performance of a Children’s Theatre Production | The Sound of Music, Northglenn Youth Theatre |
| Outstanding Achievement in Fight Direction | Geoffrey Kent |

== 5th Annual Henry Awards ==
Presented on July 19, 2010 at the Denver Center for the Performing Arts for the 2009-2010 season.

The 2009-2010 Henry Award winners were:

| Category | Winner |
| Outstanding Season for a Theatre Company | Miners Alley Playhouse |
| Outstanding Production of a Play | A Picasso, Miners Alley Playhouse, Robert Kramer, Director |
| Outstanding Production of a Musical | Miss Saigon, Arvada Center |
| Outstanding Direction of a Play | Robert Kramer, Grace and Glorie, Miners Alley Playhouse |
| Outstanding Direction of a Musical | Steve Wilson, Man of La Mancha, PHAMALY |
| Outstanding Musical Direction | David Nehls, Miss Saigon, Arvada Center |
| Outstanding Lead Actor in a Play | Chris Kendall, A Picasso, Miners Alley Playhouse |
| Outstanding Lead Actress in a Play | Billie McBride, Grace and Glorie, Miners Alley Playhouse |
| Outstanding Lead Actor in a Musical | Kevin Vortmann, Miss Saigon, Arvada Center |
| Outstanding Lead Actress in a Musical | EJ Zimmerman, Miss Saigon, Arvada Center |
| Outstanding Supporting Actor in a Play | Jean-Pierre Serret, Mariela in the Desert, Denver Center Theatre Company |
| Outstanding Supporting Actress in a Play | Hannah Duggan, The World is Mine, Buntport Theatre |
| Outstanding Supporting Actor in a Musical | Daniel Herron, Miss Saigon, Arvada Center |
| Outstanding Supporting Actress in a Musical | Erin Rollman, Jugged Rabbit Stew, Buntport Theatre |
| Outstanding Ensemble Performance | A Picasso, Miners Alley Playhouse |
| Outstanding Choreography | Stephen Bourneuf, Joseph and the Amazing Technicolor Dreamcoat, Arvada Center |
| Outstanding New Play or Musical | The World is Mine, Buntport Theatre |
| Outstanding Costume Design | Chris Campbell, Joseph and the Amazing Technicolor Dreamcoat, Arvada Center |
| Outstanding Lighting Design | Gail Gober, Joseph and the Amazing Technicolor Dreamcoat, Arvada Center |
| Outstanding Scenic Design | Vicki Smith, Mariela in the Desert, Denver Center Theatre Company |
| Outstanding Sound Design | Steve Stevens, Miss Saigon, Arvada Center |
| Lifetime Achievement Award | Bill McHale |
| Outstanding Regional Theatre Award | Breckenridge Backstage Theatre |
| Outstanding Scenic Painting | Daniel Lowenstein |
| Outstanding Props and Set Dressing | Beki Pineda |
| Outstanding Children's Theatre | Aurora Fox "Little Foxes" |

== 4th Annual Henry Awards ==
Presented on June 29, 2009 at the Denver Center for the Performing Arts for the 2008-2009 season.

The 2008-2009 Henry Award winners were:

| Category | Winner |
| Outstanding Season for a Theatre Company | Denver Center Theatre Company |
| Outstanding Production of a Play | Glengarry Glen Ross, Denver Center Theatre Company |
| Outstanding Production of a Musical | Les Miserables. Arvada Center |
| Outstanding Direction of a Play | Jeffrey Nickelson, Joe Turner’s Come and Gone, Shadow Theatre Company |
| Outstanding Direction of a Musical | Rod A. Lansberry, Les Miserables, Arvada Center |
| Outstanding Musical Direction | David Nehls, Les Miserables, Arvada Center |
| Outstanding Lead Actor in a Play | Cajardo Lindsey, Joe Turner’s Come and Gone, Shadow Theatre Company |
| Outstanding Lead Actress in a Play | Kathleen M. Brady, A Trip to Bountiful, Denver Center Theatre Company |
| Outstanding Lead Actor in a Musical | Randal Keith, Les Miserables, Arvada Center |
| Outstanding Lead Actress in a Musical | Regan Linton, Side Show, PHAMALY |
| Outstanding Supporting Actor in a Play | Mike Hartman, Glengarry Glen Ross, Denver Center Theatre Company |
| Outstanding Supporting Actress in a Play | Julie Jesneck, The Trip to Bountiful, Denver Center Theatre Company |
| Outstanding Supporting Actor in a Musical | Stephen Day, Les Miserables, Arvada Center |
| Outstanding Supporting Actress in a Musical | Beth Flynn, Les Miserables, Arvada Center |
| Outstanding Ensemble Performance | Les Miserables, Arvada Center |
| Outstanding Choreography | Kitty Skillman-Hilsabeck, Les Miserables, Arvada Center |
| Outstanding New Play or Musical | Sunsets and Margaritas, written by Jose Cruz Gonzales, produced by Denver Center Theatre Company |
| Outstanding Costume Design | Sally A. Burkes and Jane Shafer, Les Miserables, Arvada Center |
| Outstanding Lighting Design | Gail J. Gober, Les Miserables, Arvada Center |
| Outstanding Scenic Design | Brian Mallgrave, Les Miserables, Arvada Center |
| Outstanding Sound Design | Craig Breitenbach, Quilters, Denver Center Theatre Company |
| Lifetime Achievement Award | Robert Wells |
| Outstanding Regional Theatre Award | Theatre Aspen |
| Outstanding Children’s Theater | Denver Children’s Theatre at the Mizel Center |
| Outstanding Stage Management | Paul Behrhorst |

== 3rd Annual Henry Awards ==
Presented on July 7, 2008 at Town Hall Arts Center for the 2007-2008 season.

The 2007-2008 Henry Award winners were:

| Category | Winner |
| Outstanding Season for a Theatre Company | Denver Center Theatre Company |
| Outstanding Production of a Play | Lydia, Denver Center Theatre Company |
| Outstanding Production of a Musical | La Cage aux Folles, Arvada Center |
| Outstanding Direction of a Play | Warren Sherrill, Who’s Afraid of Virginia Woolf? Paragon Theatre Company |
| Outstanding Direction of a Musical | Steve Wilson, Urinetown, the Musical, PHAMALY |
| Outstanding Lead Actor in a Play | Gene Gillette, The Lieutenant of Inishmore, Curious Theatre Company |
| Outstanding Lead Actress in a Play | Jeanne Paulsen Doubt, Denver Center Theatre Company’s |
| Outstanding Lead Actor in a Musical | Michael E. Gold, La Cage aux Folles, Arvada Center |
| Outstanding Lead Actress in a Musical | Juliet Villa, Urinetown, the Musical, PHAMALY |
| Outstanding Supporting Actor in a Play | Mike Hartman, Plainsong, Denver Center Theatre Company |
| Outstanding Supporting Actress in a Play | Barbra Andrews, Who’s Afraid of Virginia Woolf? Paragon Theatre Company, |
| Outstanding Supporting Actor in a Musical | Marcus Waterman. The Best Little Whorehouse in Texas, Arvada Center |
| Outstanding Supporting Actress in a Musical | Megan Van de Hey, Company, Town Hall Arts Center |
| Outstanding Ensemble Performance | Lydia, Denver Center Theatre Company |
| Outstanding Choreography | Urinetown, the Musical, Debbie Stark and Cindy Bray, PHAMALY |
| Outstanding New Play or Musical | Lydia, written by Octavio Solis, produced by Denver Center Theatre Company |
| Outstanding Costume Design | Nicole Harrison, La Cage aux Folles, Arvada Center |
| Outstanding Lighting Design | Stephen D. Mazzeno, Urinetown, the Musical, PHAMALY |
| Outstanding Scenic Design | David Lafont, Who's Afraid of Virginia Woolf? Paragon Theatre Company |
| Outstanding Sound Design | Craig Beitenbach, Plainsong, Denver Center Theatre Company |
| Lifetime Achievement Award | John Ashton |
| Outstanding Regional Theatre Award | Bas Bleu |
| Special Achievement in Children’s Theatre | Buntport Theater |
| Special Achievement in Theatre Technology and Engineering | El Armstrong |

== 2nd Annual Henry Awards ==
Presented on July 9, 2007 at the Aurora Fox Theatre for the 2006-2007 season.

The 2006-2007 Henry Award winners were:

| Category | Winner |
| Outstanding Season for a Theatre Company | Boulder’s Dinner Theatre |
| Outstanding Production of a Play | Frankie and Johnny at the Claire de Lune, Paragon Theatre Company |
| Outstanding Production of a Musical | Ragtime, Boulder’s Dinner Theatre |
| Outstanding Direction of a Play | Nick Sugar, Dog Sees God, The Avenue Theatre |
| Outstanding Direction of a Musical | Michael J. Duran, Ragtime, Boulder’s Dinner Theatre |
| Outstanding Lead Actor in a Play | Thomas Borrillo, Frankie and Johnny at the Claire de Lune, Paragon Theatre Company |
| Outstanding Lead Actress in a Play | Emily Paton Davies, Frankie and Johnny at the Claire de Lune, Paragon Theatre Company |
| Outstanding Lead Actor in a Musical | Wayne Kennedy, Ragtime, Boulder’s Dinner Theatre |
| Outstanding Lead Actress in a Musical | Shelley Cox-Robie, Ragtime, Boulder’s Dinner Theatre |
| Outstanding Supporting Actor in a Play | Jason Henning, tempOdyssey, Curious Theatre Company |
| Outstanding Supporting Actress in a Play | Elgin Kelley, Dog Sees God, The Avenue Theatre |
| Outstanding Supporting Actor in a Musical | Brandon Dill, Ragtime, Boulder’s Dinner Theatre |
| Outstanding Supporting Actress in a Musical | Genevieve Baer, Urinetown, Score Marketing |
| Outstanding Ensemble Performance | Dog Sees God, The Avenue Theatre |
| Outstanding Choreography | Kitty Skillman Hilsabeck, Swing, Country Dinner Playhouse |
| Outstanding New Play or Musical | Something Is Rotten, written and produced by Buntport Theater |
| Outstanding Costume Design | Linda Morken, Ragtime, Boulder’s Dinner Theatre |
| Outstanding Lighting Design | Shannon McKinney, tempOdyssey, Curious Theatre Company |
| Outstanding Scenic Design | Christopher Wink, Hedda Gabler, Paragon Theatre Company |
| Outstanding Sound Design | Dave Johnson, Dog Sees God, The Avenue Theatre |

== 1st Annual Henry Awards ==
Presented on June 5, 2006 at the New Denver Civic Theatre for the 2005-2006 season.

The 2005-2006 Henry Award winners were:

| Category | Winner |
| Outstanding Season for a Theatre Company | Denver Center Theatre Company |
| Outstanding Production of a Play | After Ashley, Denver Center Theatre Company |
| Outstanding Production of a Musical | Assassins, Next Stage |
| Outstanding Direction of a Play | Bruce K. Sevy, All My Sons, Denver Center Theatre Company |
| Outstanding Direction of a Musical | Steve Wilson, Joseph and the Amazing Technicolor Dreamcoat, PHAMALy |
| Outstanding Lead Actor in a Play | William Hahn, Frozen, Curious Theatre Company |
| Outstanding Lead Actress in a Play | Rhonda Lee Brown, Bug, Curious Theatre Company |
| Outstanding Lead Actor in a Musical | Nick Sugar, The Rocky Horror Show, The Avenue Theatre |
| Outstanding Lead Actress in a Musical | Shelly Cox-Robie, The King and I, Boulder’s Dinner Theatre |
| Outstanding Supporting Actor in a Play | Charles Weldon, Gem of the Ocean, Denver Center Theatre Company |
| Outstanding Supporting Actress in a Play | Kim Staunton, Gem of the Ocean, Denver Center Theatre Company |
| Outstanding Supporting Actor in a Musical | Todd Coulter, Assassins, Next Stage |
| Outstanding Supporting Actress in a Musical | Julie Reiber, Aida, Arvada Center for the Arts and Humanities |
| Outstanding Ensemble Performance | The War Anthology, Curious Theatre Company |
| Outstanding Choreography | Alicia Dunfee, The Music Man, Boulder’s Dinner Theatre |
| Outstanding New Play or Musical | The War Anthology, written by Will Eno, Tony Kushner, Melissa Lucero McCarl, Bonnie Metzgar, Suzan-Lori Parks, Elaine Romero, Mildred Ruiz, Robert Lewis Vaughan and Paula Vogel; produced by Curious Theatre Company |
| Outstanding Costume Design | Kevin Copenhaver, Crowns, Denver Center Theatre Company |
| Outstanding Lighting Design | Jane Cox, The Clean House, Denver Center Theatre Company |
| Outstanding Scenic Design | Alexander Dodge, The Clean House, Denver Center Theatre Company |
| Outstanding Sound Design | Brian Freeland, Bug, Curious Theatre Company |
