= List of theaters in Colorado =

Theater venues in the US state of Colorado include:

- Arvada
  - Arvada Center for the Arts and Humanities
- Boulder:
  - Chautauqua Auditorium
  - University of Colorado at Boulder runs several theaters, and hosts the annual Colorado Shakespeare Festival.
- Denver:
  - The Aurora Fox
  - The Avenue Theater is located four blocks from Downtown Denver, providing high-class performances.
  - Denver Center for the Performing Arts is the second largest performing arts center in the US.
  - The E-vent Center
  - Germinal Stage Denver
  - Next Stage Denver
  - The Theater Off Broadway is located four blocks south of Downtown Denver, in the Santa Fe Arts District.
- Fort Collins:
  - Bas Bleu Theatre Company
- Littleton:
  - Town Hall Arts Center
- Southern Colorado
  - Historic Jones Theater located in Westcliffe in the Wet Mountain Valley

== See also ==
- Theater in the United States
- Phamaly Theatre Company has performed at numerous Denver venues since 1989.
