= Nehls =

The surname Nehls may refer to:

- David Nehls (born 1964), American actor, performer, musical director, and composer
- Michael Nehls (born 1962), German doctor of medicine, author, and former cyclist
- Troy Nehls (born 1968), American politician from Texas
