= Peggy Jo Tallas =

American bank robber (1944–2005)

- Caught by a security camera in 1992
- Born: June 6, 1944; Kaufman, Texas, U.S.
- Died: May 5, 2005 (aged 60); Tyler, Texas, U.S.
- Cause of death: Gunshot wounds
- Other name: Cowboy Bob
- Height: 5 ft 10 in (177 cm)

Peggy Jo Tallas (June 6, 1944 – May 5, 2005) was an American bank robber who would cross-dress as a man to conceal her identity, earning her the media epithet Cowboy Bob for always sporting a white ten-gallon hat. She robbed a total of five banks in Texas between 1991 and 1992 before she was caught by the Federal Bureau of Investigation, but as Tallas never used a weapon during her robberies, she received a light sentence of 33 months. In 2005, after living quietly for the past decade, she committed suicide by cop after police caught up to her escaping the scene of her final bank robbery.

Her story is to be filmed as Peggy Jo by Phillip Noyce in which she will be played by Lily James. Her story was theatricalized by Buntport Theater and Square Product Theatre in their 2014 play Peggy Jo & the Desolate Nothing. A Cowboy Bob musical was produced at the Alley Theatre in 2023.

== Biography ==
Peggy Jo Tallas was born in Kaufman, TX on June 6, 1944 to Pete Tallas Sr. and Helen Fay Tallas. She was the youngest of three children. Her father died of cancer when she was four years old. As a result, her mother was forced to get a job as a nurse aide to support the family. Unlike her siblings, Tallas was a free-spirited teenager and dropped out of high school in the tenth grade. She was constantly on the go, always looking for new adventures. Karen Jones, Tallas' childhood friend, recalls that one day Tallas hopped in her car and decided to drive to San Francisco, because she wanted to see what life was like there. Her favorite movie was Butch Cassidy and the Sundance Kid. In her twenties, she moved to North Dallas and got a job as a receptionist at a Marriott Hotel. While working at the Marriott, she became close friends with another receptionist named Cherry Young. Young noted that Tallas had no desire to get married or have children soon, nor did she think about a career or money. One afternoon while the two were driving, they passed a Wells Fargo armored truck. Tallas said, "you know, I could rob that and not have to worry about anything for a while." Young laughed, not thinking twice about Tallas ever doing such a thing.

Many years passed, and Tallas's friends were all married, but a bad experience with a man left a bad taste in her mouth, steering her away from all men. In 1977, Tallas was booked for car theft in Tarrant County. In 1984, she moved with her mother Helen to a Dallas suburb to help care for her, as she had fallen ill with a degenerative bone disease. The medical bills kept rising. Tallas felt like she was falling behind and could not catch up, and she was too proud to ask for help. Young explained that it was likely that Tallas felt as if her "life was slipping away," and she was "losing her wild side".

=== Bank robberies ===
In May 1991, wearing a pair of men's pants, a dark men's shirt, a brown leather jacket, a fake beard, aviator sunglasses, oversized riding boots and a cowboy hat, Tallas walked into an American Federal Bank in Irving, Texas. With her head down, she walked up to a teller and slid her a note saying, "this is a bank robbery. Give me your money. No marked bills or dye packs." The teller handed her the money as her instructions stated, and she walked out with a stack of cash without anyone else noticing. After her first success, Tallas continued to rob banks all around the Dallas area, as well as Garland and Mesquite, using the same disguise. She gained herself the name of Cowboy Bob. She was careful not to make small mistakes, leaving FBI's Steve Powell with few to no leads. In September 1992, after many robberies, Tallas committed two robberies in one day. She used her personal license plate, which was traced back to her apartment. It was there that all her schemes were finally uncovered. Powell admitted that he never considered the possibility that Cowboy Bob could be a woman. Tallas was sentenced to 33 months in prison. After her release, she returned home to her mother, and continued to care for her until she died in December 2002. Tallas always had a dream of going down to Padre Island or Mexico to live out the rest of her life.

=== Death ===
On May 5, 2005, Tallas drove her RV to the Guaranty Bank in Tyler, Texas. She told a young teller, "this is a robbery. I need all of your money. Don't set any alarms." Tallas got the money but failed to check for a dye pack, which exploded when she left the bank. The smoke caught the attention of pedestrians, and law enforcement was notified. The police found her in her RV, and surrounded her. Tallas climbed out of her car, telling police that she had a gun, and that they'd have to kill her. When they refused, she pulled out her toy pistol, and they immediately shot her dead. She is buried in Kaufman Cemetery in her hometown.
