= Aurora Symphony Orchestra =

Orchestra in Aurora, Colorado, U.S.

- community symphony orchestra
- Short name: ASO
- Founded: 1978 (48 years ago)
- Location: Aurora, Colorado, U.S.
- Concert hall: Aurora Fox Arts Center, Aurora, Colorado
- Music director: Jeremy Cuebas
- Website: aurorasymphony.org

The Aurora Symphony Orchestra is an all-volunteer community-based orchestra, founded in 1978, based in Aurora, Colorado, United States.

== Season ==
The orchestra's regular season occurs annually from August through May of each year, during which it performs public concerts, including: Fall Masterworks Concert, Holiday Concert, Family Concert, Spring Masterworks Concert and the Arts for a Better Tomorrow Concert. The orchestra also performs during select summer events.

== Musicians ==
All musicians of the Aurora Symphony Orchestra are volunteers and are accepted by audition. Auditions are held annually during the month of August and throughout the year, and are open to all musicians who play an orchestral instrument at a proficient-through-advanced level. Membership ranges from high-school age through retirees. The basic commitment for musicians includes: weekly rehearsals, dress rehearsals and scheduled performances.

== Organization ==
The Aurora Symphony Orchestra operates as a 501(c)(3) organization (non-profit) and is governed by a board of directors consisting of community members and orchestra-musician representatives.

== Special events ==
=== Children & Family Concert ===
The orchestra annually produces a concert specifically designed for young children, first-time concert goers and their families. This concert is presented free of charge to all attendees and typically includes programing of music with a multi-cultural theme, including selections with vocal narration, which is often presented in both English and Spanish. Other activities designed to engage children include the "Instrument Petting Zoo", where children are encouraged to come on stage with the orchestra members, ask questions and receive first-hand experience holding the instruments to make that first positive impression of music.

== Collaborations ==
The Aurora Symphony Orchestra has been collaborating with other performing-arts organizations.

=== List of collaborations ===
- 2016 Aurora Dance Arts – The Nutcracker (ballet composed by Pyotr Ilyich Tchaikovsky)
- 2016 Opera on Tap Colorado – Die Fledermaus (opera composed by Johann Strauss II)
- 2018 Aurora Dance Arts – The Nutcracker (ballet composed by Pyotr Ilyich Tchaikovsky)

== See also ==
- List of symphony orchestras in the United States
- Music of Colorado
