= Elaine Romero =

Latina playwright and professor

Elaine Romero is a Latina playwright and professor at the University of Arizona School of Theatre, Film & Television, where she teaches playwriting, screenwriting, and dramaturgy. She is the author of more than 100 plays, including the Border Trilogy (Wetback, Mother of Exiles, and Title IX) and the War Pentalogy (Graveyard of Empires, A Work of Art, Revóluciones/Revolutions, When Reason Sleeps, and Martínez in Taos). In 2026, she was awarded a Guggenheim Fellowship in Drama & Performance Art by the John Simon Guggenheim Memorial Foundation in recognition of her demonstrated achievement and exceptional promise in playwriting.

== Childhood ==
Romero has three brothers. Her mother was an educator and her father was a businessman. Her parents encouraged Romero and her siblings to be socially conscious and to be able to express their thoughts. As a result, her home was a home where “conversations about poverty, the death penalty, the prevalence of homelessness, presidential elections and warfare were commonplace, as were talks about the importance of community and charity”. This social consciousness is reflected in her plays, where characters that live in tragic and unfortunate situations are explored and social justice issues are presented to start conversations. Her work oftentimes presents characters that exist in more than one realm. She believes that every individual exists in different planes and is interested in capturing those unique experiences.

Romero began writing at a young age, but she didn't tell anyone. In fact, her mother didn't discover her daughter's interest in writing until she found and read Romero's diary while cleaning the house. In high school, she mostly wrote short stories. At age fifteen, she went to a PEN conference with a short story about the death of her uncle, who died during active duty.

== Education ==
Romero received her BA in creative writing from Linfield College (now Linfield University) and her MFA in playwrighting from University of California, Davis. At the beginning of her undergraduate education, she planned to get major in literature, get her PhD, and become a literature teacher. Her first semester at Linfield, she took a dramatic literature class, and her second semester, she took a creative writing class with the same professor. When the only words coming to her were dialogue, her professor suggested she write a play. At nineteen years old, Romero realised that instead of teaching what other authors had written, she wanted to explore what she was capable of writing. Coincidentally, Linfield had just added a creative writing major, so Romero switched from literature to creative writing, becoming one of the first creative writing majors to graduate from Linfield. In retrospect, she realises how important it was that she took a chance on herself. She completed her BA in three years, graduating second in her entire class. Her thesis was a novella, titled Dead Birds Don’t Sing, which was the beginning of her fascination with the potential of nuclear war. This story inspired the final play in Romero's pentalogy on war.

Knowing she wanted to be a playwright, Romero began her master's program at University of California, Davis immediately after graduating. She was given a full ride, and spent three years in the program, getting many of her plays produced by the department.

After moving to Arizona, Romero began a long-term residency with the Arizona Theatre Company. She is also a student of renowned Latine playwright, Maria Irene Fornes.

== Role in the Latine Theatre Community ==
Romero is part of Latinx Theatre Commons, and runs a contest for Latine playwrights to support up-and-coming artists. She is committed to uplifting other playwrights of colour, using her success to bring success to others, and being generous with her time and energy to empower those who are also telling the stories that need to be told.

== Writing Process ==
According to Romero, “rewriting is writing”. She writes many drafts of each play, and is a proponent of starting over from scratch when something isn't working. In an ideal scenario, she would finish a draft within a matter of days. However, her real process begins when she is able to hear her work. Once she has a draft of any script, she hires one actor to read through the whole story aloud. She finds her own revision notes for herself to be the most important. Once she knows her goal for a given a script, she likes to get specific feedback from others, but she prefers not to receive general feedback too early, as this risks her becoming alienated from her own work.

Her biggest advice on process is not to decide “this is how I’m going to write a play”, rather let each play inform you how best to write it. She also advises aspiring writers not to worry too much about writing the theme. “What you believe will come through in what you write,” she says, in characters, circumstances, etc. If you keep the theme in mind while writing, it doesn't need to be spelled out for the audience. Overthinking, in general, can be a way for playwrights to shoot themselves in the foot. Instead, when Romero sits down to write, she deliberately tries not to know anything. She attributes her output to tricking herself into learning the play's truth rather than imposing her intellect on the story.

== Work ==
Romero’s plays often focus on themes of immigration, border identity, social justice, and the experiences of marginalized communities in the United States. Her work has been produced at regional and national theatres including Arizona Theatre Company, Goodman Theatre, and Actors Theatre of Louisville.

=== Border Trilogy: Wetback, Mother of Exiles, and Title IX ===
Romero, who is of Mexican American descent, has an interest in the Mexico–United States border. She had to go through a border checkpoint on the U.S. side to visit her grandparents in San Diego, California. Romero decided to write a trilogy that looks at the Mexican/Arizona border issues. Two plays from the trilogy are Wetback and Mother of Exiles. With the help of a grant from the National Endowment of the Arts, the Arizona Theatre Company was able to commission Romero to write the last play of her trilogy, Title IX, as well as give the playwright the opportunity to lead a project called Voices of a New America. This project focuses on developing and celebrating the voices of Latino writers all over the country.

=== War Pentalogy: Graveyard of Empires, A Work of Art, Revóluciones/Revolutions, When Reason Sleeps, and Martinez in Taos ===
She also has an interest in plays that talk about war. Romero's grandfather fought in the Battle of Iwo Jima and her uncle was lost in the Vietnam War when she was five years old. Romero started the war project by writing ten-minute plays about war, until she realized that she had a lot more to say about the subject. Romero decided to write a pentalogy of war plays, which are Graveyard of Empires, A Work of Art, Revóluciones/Revolutions, When Reason Sleeps, and Martínez in Taos. Graveyard of Empires was produced by the 16th Street Theater and won the American Blues Theater's Blue Ink Playwriting Award. In developing A Work of Art, Romero was a member of the Goodman Playwrights Unit at the Goodman Theatre. In both plays, Romero focuses on how war emotionally traumatizes those who do service for the United States as well as family members. There is no representation of the United States as a nation or information on war combats. Thus, Romero concentrates on the emotional damage caused by war in a non-linear and in some instances, non-realistic way.

=== Collaborative and community-based works ===
Romero was one of the contributing playwrights to Barrio Stories, a site-specific theatrical production developed from oral histories of Tucson’s demolished Mexican-American barrio and created in collaboration with Borderlands Theater and other playwrights. The work was staged as a walking tour performance at the site of the former neighborhood and transformed community interviews into theatrical vignettes and installations.

== Accomplishments ==
Romero has participated in the National Hispanic Media Coalition's Television Writer's Program, NBCS's Writers on the Verge Program, and CBS Diversity Institute's Writer's Mentorship Program. She has also received many awards, some of which are the Arizona Commission on the Arts Playwriting Fellowship, TCG/Pew National Theatre Artist in Residence grant, the Los Angeles Film School Scholarship, the Sprenger-Lang New History Play Contest, the Tennessee Williams One-Act Play Award, Henry Award for Outstanding New Play and the Chicano/Latino Literary Award. In 2021, the Arizona Theatre Company organised a virtual festival to celebrate Romero's work, called RomeroFest. They produced twenty plays, in coordination with several other theatre companies in the US and internationally.
