= Arizona Onstage Productions =

Non-profit theater company in Tucson, Arizona

Arizona Onstage Productions is a non-profit theater company in Tucson, Arizona. The company was founded by former touring actor Kevin Johnson and is mainly known for producing unusual, thought-provoking and often controversial musicals. Although the small company lacks the resources or theater space of comparatively gigantic companies such as Arizona Theatre Company and the University of Arizona theater department, it has drawn great amounts of praise from local theater critics for its intelligent and irreverent productions. In 2004, the company won three MAC Awards (the local awards for theater in Tucson) for its production of Stephen Sondheim's musical Assassins, specifically best musical, best actor, and best director. In 2005, the company received two nominations for best musical (one for Joel Payley's Ruthless! The Musical, and one for William Finn and James Lapine's A New Brain), two nominations for Best Actress and one for Best Actor.

In 2006, Arizona Onstage Productions collaborated with the BASIS Charter School (where Johnson teaches theatre arts) to produce the first original work for the company, the children's opera Brundibar: Hear My Voice, a new version of Hans Krasa's classic children's opera Brundibar. This new version kept Krasa's original text and music, but added new material (written by one of Johnson's students) which tells the story of the piece's production in the Theresienstadt concentration camp. Brundibar: Hear My Voice played April first and second at the Temple of Music and Art in Tucson. New material was scored for performances in late 2006-early 2007.

William Finn's Elegies—Looking Up in mid-November 2006 won the MAC award for best musical. Later shows for the company include Paul Bonin-Rodriguez's one man show Talk of the Town in January 2007 and its follow-up The Bible Belt... and Other Accessories in January 2008. The musicals The Full Monty (February 2007), Bark: The Musical (July 2007) and Stephen Sondheim's Sunday in the Park with George (June 2008) are among their recent successes.

In January 2010, they will present a production of The Great American Trailer Park Musical, featuring what is believed to be the first-ever use of scratch and sniff cards in a theatrical production.
