= The Great American Trailer Park Musical =

- Original cast recording
- Music: David Nehls
- Lyrics: David Nehls
- Book: Betsy Kelso
- Productions: 2005 Off-Broadway; 2008 US tour

The Great American Trailer Park Musical is a two-act musical, written by David Nehls and Betsy Kelso. It explores the relationships between the tenants at the Armadillo Acres Trailer Park in Starke, Florida, particularly between Pippi, "the stripper on the run," the Dr. Phil-loving agoraphobic, Jeannie, and Jeannie's tollbooth-collector husband, Norbert. It was performed in the first annual New York Music Theater Festival in 2004 and Off-Broadway in 2005.

== Productions ==
The musical opened Off-Broadway at Bows at Dodger Stages on September 22, 2005, and starred Marya Grandy (Lin), Linda Hart (Betty), Shuler Hensley (Norbert), Kaitlin Hopkins (Jeannie), Leslie Kritzer (Pickles), Orfeh (Pippi), and Wayne Wilcox (Duke); Betsy Kelso is the director. The show closed on December 4, 2005, after 121 performances.

The U.S. regional premiere of Trailer Park opened on June 2, 2006, at Hippodrome State Theatre in Gainesville, Florida.

The First National Tour of The Great American Trailer Park Musical began January 2008 in Spokane, Washington. Directed and choreographed by Steven Smeltzer; starring Erica Livingston (Jeannie), David Howard (Norbert), Sara Ruzicka (Pippi), MaryAnne Piccolo (Lin), Lindsay Devino (Pickles), Dane Agostinis (Duke), Doreen Barnard (Betty), Kenneth D'Elia and Carolyn Kimmel (Swings). The role of Jeannie was replaced by Amanda Earls and the role of Pickles was replaced by Caitlin Maloney in the second U.S. portion.

The Great American Trailer Park Musical made its UK premiere with the same cast from the 1st National Tour at the Edinburgh Fringe Festival in 2008. It then made its English premiere later that year in Birmingham, England.

In January 2010, Tucson, Arizona based theatre company Arizona Onstage Productions presented what is believed to be the world's first scratch and sniff musical, with scent cards distributed to the audience to be scratched at specific points in the show.

In April 2010, the show had its New England premiere with the SpeakEasy Stage Company, with Leigh Barrett (Jeannie), Mary Callanan (Lin), Kerry A. Dowling (Betty), and David Benoit (Norbert).

The Great American Trailer Park Musical made its Australasian premier at the New Theatre (Newtown) in Sydney, NSW, Australia on 18 November 2010.

A French-Canadian production of «The Great American Trailor Park Musical» called «Ma femme, ma blonde, ma roulotte» was presented alternately with the original show at the 2011 edition of Montreal's Next Wave Festival, with Monik Vincent (Betty), Lisa Forget (Jeannie), Pierre Lenoir (Norbert), Cecile Cristobald (Pippi), Stéphanie Lessard (Pickles), Tina Mancini (Lin) and Jérôme Roy (Duke). Stephen Pietrantoni was directing while Maxime Bégin did the musical direction and Lorna Wayne was choreographer. The book was translated by Stephen Pietrantoni, David Laurin and Patrick Olafson. In October 2011, the French production was invited to perform in New York city during the NYMF.

The Finger Lakes Musical Theatre Festival (Auburn, N.Y.) put on a production of the show from June 6 to July 14, 2013, with LilyAnn Carlson (Pickles), Kristen Gehling (Lin), Andy Lindberg (Norbert), Chelsey Whitelock (Betty), and Brooke Wilson (Jeannie). The production was part of the Festival's MGR Downtown series.

== Plot ==
At the Armadillo Acres trailer park in Starke, Florida, high school sweethearts Norbert and Jeannie have settled into a loveless marriage, complicated by Jeannie's unwillingness to leave her trailer since the abduction of her son two decades prior. Norbert has purchased tickets for the couple to watch the Ice Capades as a present for their upcoming anniversary, in hopes of coaxing Jeannie out of the trailer. Soon arriving in town is Pippi, a stripper on the run from her abusive boyfriend, hoping the drama at Armadillo Acres will distract everyone else from her plight to allow her to live in peace.

One night, Norbert's brother dupes him into going to the strip club where Pippi works. Pippi and Norbert find they have much in common with each other and begin an affair, leaving Jeannie alone to sulk, unaware of what her husband is doing.

Eventually, back in Oklahoma, Pippi's ex-boyfriend Duke, who gets high from sniffing markers and carries a large handgun named "Bertha," finds out that Pippi has fled to Starke and tracks her down to Armadillo Acres. In the climax, Jeannie discovers Norbert's affair, Pippi learns that Duke has found her, and Duke arrives—only to find that "Bertha" is a harmless squirt gun and that, to the surprise of everyone, Duke is actually Norbert and Jeannie's long-lost son, who fled his captors after they tried to raise him as a vegetarian. Both couples reconcile.

== Recording ==
The Great American Trailer Park Musical was recorded on October 26, 2005, at Right Track Studio A in NYC and was released on January 17, 2006, by Sh-K-Boom Records.

== Music, Lyrics and Book ==
The Music, Lyrics and Book of The Great American Trailer Park Musical are published in paperback by Dramatists Play Service, Inc. (ISBN 978-0822221371, December 30, 2006).

== Webisodes ==
In 2009, a Nashville production of The Great American Trailer Park Musical released a series of webisodes with the characters from the musical. The storyline followed the introduction of the Internet to the trailer park and the mayhem it caused.

== Musical numbers ==
- This Side of the Tracks
- One Step Closer
- The Buck Stops Here
- It Doesn't Take A Genius
- Owner of My Heart
- The Great American TV Show
- Flushed Down the Pipes
- Storm's A-Brewin'
- Road Kill
- But He's Mine / It's Never Easy
- That's Why I Love My Man
- Panic
- Finale
- This Side of the Tracks (Reprise)
