= David Nehls =

American actor

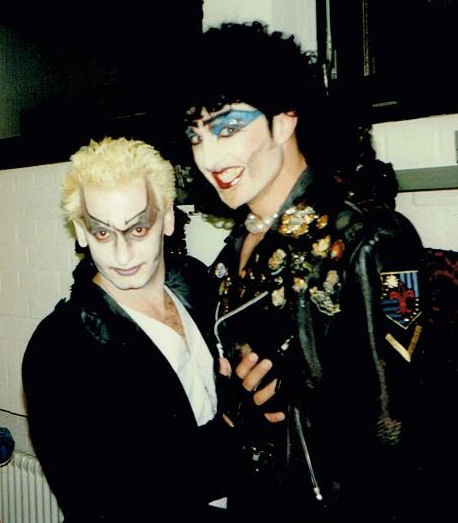
David Nehls (left) as Riff Raff and William E. Lester as Frank N. Furter in the 1996 European tour of The Rocky Horror Show

David Nehls (born 28 April 1964) is an American actor, singer, composer and lyricist who, with Betsy Kelso, wrote The Great American Trailer Park Musical. Among other appearances he originated the role of Riff Raff in the 1996-2000 European tour of The Rocky Horror Show. Today he works as a musical director for various theatres across the United States.

== Acting career ==
Born as David Ronald Nehls and a native of Uniontown in Pennsylvania, he is the son of Ronald Nehls (1937–2008), a former Fayette County commissioner, and Darlene (née Duall), who worked at the Uniontown Hospital. In 1982 Nehls graduated from Laurel Highlands High School; he had studied piano for ten years before being accepted into the Shenandoah Conservatory, an arts college near Washington, D.C., where in 1987 he wrote his first musical, Starting Another Day.

Following this Nehls began an acting career which included playing in American National Tours as Seymour in Little Shop of Horrors; Lord Jasper Tring in Me and My Girl; Sonny the Gangster in City of Angels, and Eddie Cantor in Ziegfeld: A Night at the Follies (1991). He originated the role of Don Wand in a Rock'n'Roll version of Beauty and the Beast. In regional theatre Nehls appeared as Cosmé McMoon in Souvenir; Tom Sawyer in Big River; Herod in Jesus Christ Superstar; George M. Cohan in George M!; and The Top Banana in Little Rhody's Big Burlesque opposite Gennifer Flowers.

From 1996 to 2000 Nehls played Riff Raff in the European tour of The Rocky Horror Show and appeared on the soundtrack CD which was released by Lava Records/Polymedia International Music Service and which had been recorded in January 1996 at the Livingstone Studios in London.

== Writing credits ==
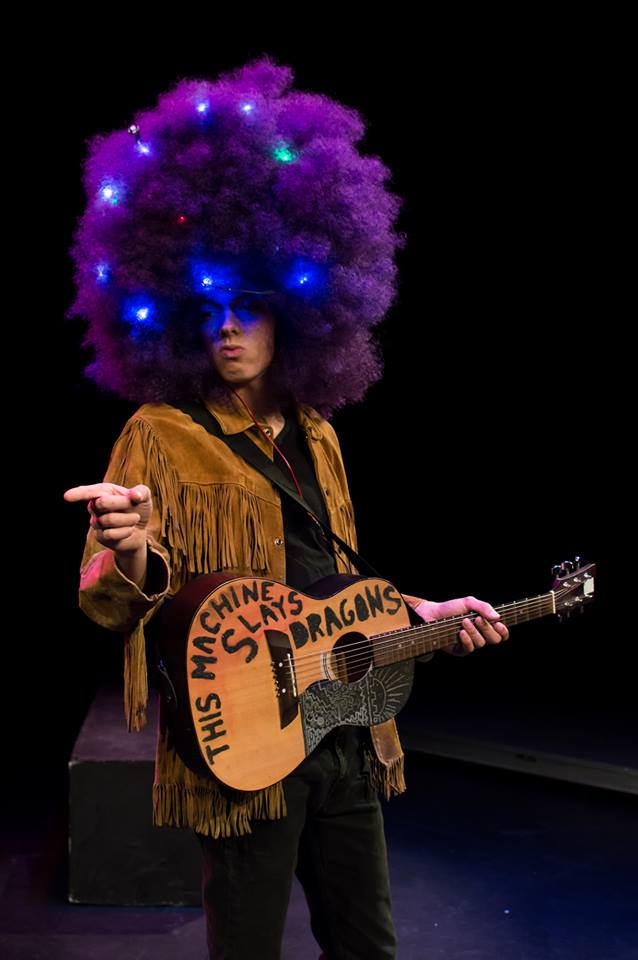
Nate Christensen in Killer Wigs From Outer Space (2017)

Among others, Nehls wrote the music and lyrics for Starting Another Day (1987), which premiered at the John F. Kennedy Center for the Performing Arts in 1987; The Great American Trailer Park Musical (New York Musical Theatre Festival (2004), Off-Broadway Production (2005), National Tour (2007), the Edinburgh Festival (2008) and various regional productions across the U.S.), written with Betsy Kelso during their European tour of The Rocky Horror Show; Broadway Bares; The Watercoolers (Off-Broadway Production (2002) and a 2007 National Tour); Breach (Evolution Theatre Company, 2011); It's A Wonderful Life (National Tour (1993) and regional productions); Killer Wigs from Outer Space (animation project - GenCon Selection (2013), Terror Film Festival, Philadelphia (2013), New York Musical Theatre Festival (2017); The Great American Trailer Park Christmas Musical (Stages Repertory Theatre 2016); Down on the Pharm; and Mommie Dearest (2017) in collaboration with Christina Crawford, produced by Out of the Box Theatrics in New York City. He composed the score for the short Rogue Eagle Creek (2010).

With Sheryl McCallum Nehls co-wrote Miss Rhythm – The Legend of Ruth Brown which is playing at the Garner Galleria Theatre in the Denver Center for the Performing Arts from May to October 2023. Written during the COVID lockdown, and inspired by a chance meeting Nehls had with Brown on the streets of New York in his youth, the "intimate cabaret experience" explores the life of R&B performer Ruth Brown through song and story. McCallum plays Brown, who the script allows to "...interact with the audience and demonstrate her skills as a dynamic storyteller. Each tale is interwoven with a thoughtfully curated song, allowing her to delve even further into the character."

== Musical Director ==
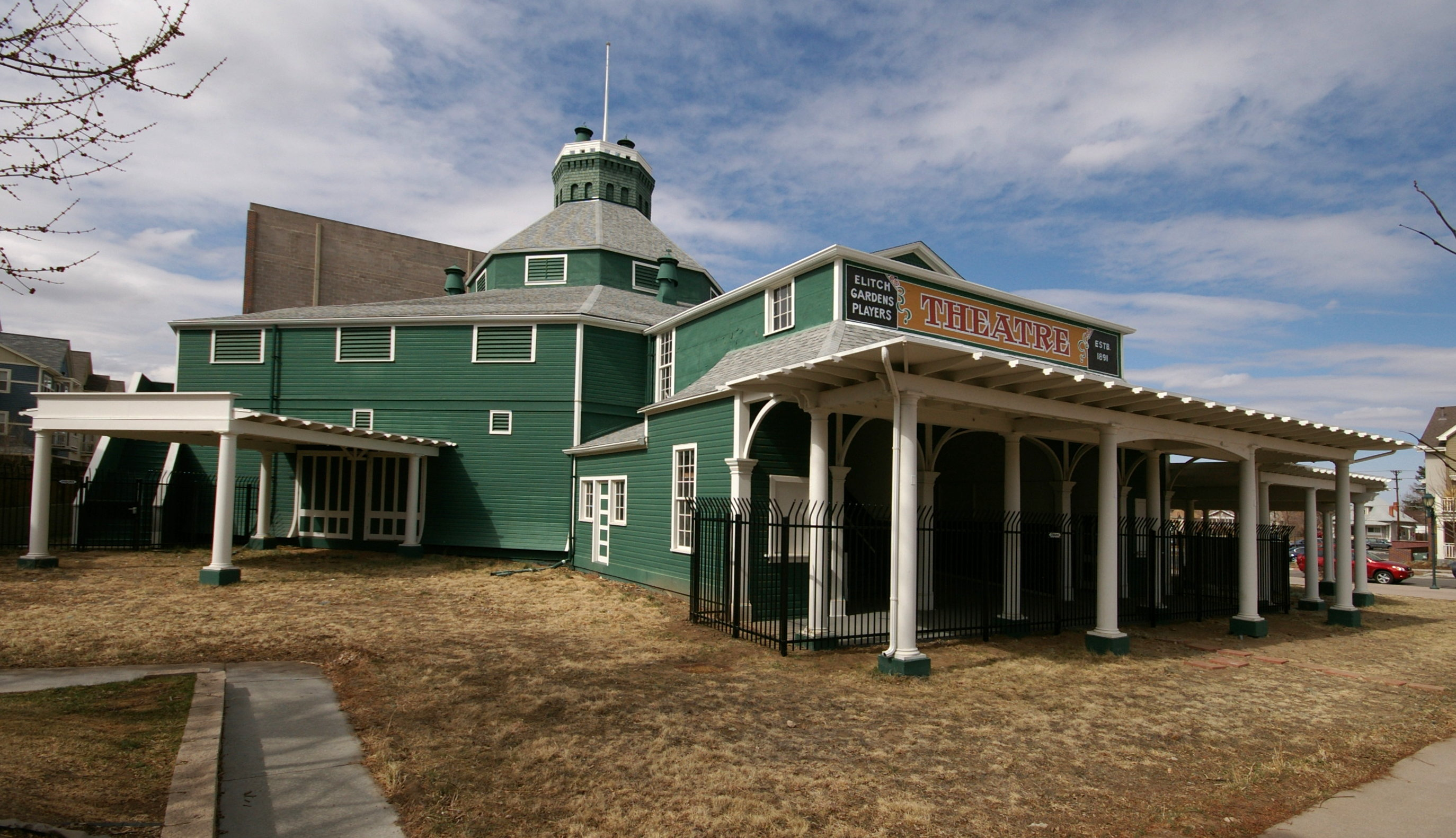
The Elitch Theatre in Denver

As a Musical Director Nehls has overseen 50 productions at the Arvada Center for the Arts and Humanities in Colorado and winning 9 Henry Awards - four for Musical Direction (2008, 2009, 2013, 2014) and five for Best Musical Production of the year (2007, 2008, 2009, 2011, 2013). He has also worked regionally as musical director at theatres including the Riverside Theatre in Vero Beach, Florida; the Fox Theatre in Denver, Colorado; American Musical Theatre of San Jose, California; Institute of Contemporary Art, Boston; TheatreWorks in Hartford, Connecticut and Carousel Dinner Theatre in Akron, Ohio.

Nehls was vice president of the Historic Elitch Gardens Theatre Foundation (2014–16), working to restore the 125-year-old Elitch Theatre in Denver, Colorado. He also served as co-chairman of the Elitch Theatre New Works Festival (2015–16). He is a member of BMI and is represented by Creative Artists Agency.
