= Karen Hartman =

American playwright and librettist

Karen Hartman is an American playwright and librettist. Her plays have been produced at 59e59, Primary Stages, Yale Repertory Theatre, Seattle Repertory Theatre, Directors Company, Denver Center Theatre, Chicago Shakespeare Theatre, People's Light, Victory Gardens, Everyman Theatre, and numerous others.

In 2022, the VOLT festival produced by off-Broadway theatre 59e59 simultaneously premiered three of Hartman's plays: New Golden Age, The Lucky Star, and Goldie, Max & Milk. Hartman’s plays have been celebrated as passionate, relevant storytelling that “resonate in the current moment with overpowering force."

== Biography ==
Hartman grew up in San Diego, California. She completed her bachelor's degree in Literature at Yale University and received Master of Fine Arts in Playwriting from Yale School of Drama.

After graduating from Yale, she moved to New York City. She was Senior Artist-in-Residence at the University of Washington School of Drama in Seattle from 2014-2019, and currently lives in Brooklyn, NY with her family.

== Career ==
Karen Hartman's plays have been produced all around the United States, including in New York at the Women's Project, National Asian American Theatre Company, P73, and Summer Play Festival, and regionally at Cincinnati Playhouse, Dallas Theater Center, the Magic, Seattle Repertory Theatre, San Diego Repertory Theatre, Victory Gardens, Theater J, Horizon Theatre, Unicorn Theater, and elsewhere.

Three of Hartman's works, Roz and Ray, The Lucky Star (as The Book of Joseph), and Project Dawn (NEA Art Works Grant, NNPN Rolling World Premiere) had ten productions across the U.S. in the 2016-18 seasons, premiering at Chicago Shakespeare Theater, People's Light, Seattle Rep, and Victory Gardens, and are published by Samuel French/Concord. The Lucky Star set records as the highest grossing play in the history of Everyman Theatre in Baltimore. Hartman is currently developing Project Dawn for Population Media Center as a television series, and another project for 20th Television.

Hartman's essays and commentary have been published in the New York Times and the Washington Post. She is the co-founder of national program #TogetherForAbortion, which brings people together for conversations about women's reproductive rights.

Hartman’s work has been supported by the Rockefeller Foundation at Bellagio, the National Endowment for the Arts, Princeton’s Hodder Fellowship, the Helen Merrill Foundation, Space at Ryder Farm, Hedgebrook, MacDowell Colony, the O’Neill Playwrights Conference, the Sustainable Arts Foundation, a Daryl Roth Creative Spirit Award, a Joseph A. Callaway Award from New Dramatists, a Jerome Fellowship, a Fulbright Scholarship, and more. She has been a guest artist at the Royal National Theatre of Great Britain.

Hartman held the Playwright Center's McKnight Residency and Commission for a nationally recognized playwright in 2014 and 2015. She held a 2019-2020 Guggenheim Fellowship and is an alumnus of New Dramatists

== Plays ==
- 2022. The Lucky Star. Commissioned by Chicago Shakespeare Theater (as The Book of Joseph) with world premiere, 2017. Off-Broadway premiere at Primary Stages (59e59 Theaters New York City). Published by Concord Theatricals
- 2022. New Golden Age. Premiered at Primary Stages (59e59 Theaters New York City) Published by Concord Theatricals
- 2022. Goldie, Max & Milk. Premiered at Florida Stage Company (West Palm Beach) 2010. Off-Broadway premiere, produced by MBL Productions at 59E59 Theaters, 2022. Published by Concord Theatricals
- 2019. Good Faith: Four Chats about Race and the New Haven Fire Department. Premiered at Yale Repertory Theatre (New Haven).
- 2018. SuperTrue. Premiered at Know Theatre (Cincinnati).
- 2017. Project Dawn. National New Play Network Rolling World Premiere. People's Light Theatre (Malvern, PA). Published by Concord Theatricals
- 2016. Roz and Ray. Co-World Premiere, Victory Gardens (Chicago) and Seattle Repertory Theatre. Published by Concord Theatricals
- Gum. Published by Dramatists Play Service
- The Mother of Modern Censorship. Published by Dramatists Play Service
- Troy Women. Published by Playscripts
- Girl Under Grain. Published by NoPassportPress
- Leah's Train. Published by Playscripts.
- Alice: Tales of a Curious Girl (adapted from Lewis Carroll). Published by Playscripts.
- Wild Kate: A Tale of Revenge at Sea (adapted from Moby-Dick). Published by Playscripts.
- Antigone Project –co-author. Published by NoPassportPress.
- New America: Contemporary Literature for a Changing Society –co-author.
- Going Gone
- No Second Troy
- Reproducing Georgia

== Musical books ==
- 2022 Rattlesnake Kate. Music & lyrics by Neyla Pekarek
- 2019 Alice Bliss. Music by Jenny Giering, Lyrics by Adam Gwon, Based on the novel by Laura Harrington
- The Magic Flute. Produced by Seattle Meany Theater
- MotherBone. Produced by Salvage Vanguard Theater

== Awards & Honors ==
- Susan Smith Blackburn Award (Finalist) for New Golden Age, 2023
- Henry Award for Best New Work for Rattlesnake Kate (book by Karen Hartman, score by Neyla Pekarek), 2022
- John Simon Memorial Guggenheim Fellow, 2022
- Weston-Ghostlight New Musical Award for Alice Bliss, 2019
- Edgerton New Play Prize for Roz and Ray, 2016
- Deborah Salzer Award for Excellence in Arts Education, 2017
- Lambda Literary Award for LGBTQ+ Drama for Goldie, Max & Milk, 2025
