= Phamaly Theatre Company =

Theater group and touring company based in Denver, Colorado

- Company type: Non-profit
- Industry: Entertainment
- Genre: Theatre / Disability
- Founded: 1989
- Headquarters: Denver, CO, United States
- Area served: Denver Metro
- Website: www.phamaly.org

Phamaly Theatre Company (formerly the Physically Handicapped Actors & Musical Artists League or PHAMALy), also known as just Phamaly (as in "family"), is a theater group and touring company based in Denver, Colorado, formed entirely of people with disabilities from across the spectrum. Phamaly was founded in 1989 by five people living with disabilities who wanted to create a theatre company that provided individuals like them with the opportunity to perform. Since their debut, Phamaly Theatre Company (PTC) has produced more and more shows each year, including original works which have received multiple local awards, such as Denver Post Ovation Awards, Westword Awards, and Colorado Theatre Guild Henry Awards. The company's season also includes various touring and educational shows.

== Origin ==
A group of five students living with disabilities (Kevin Ahl, Richard Britton, Kathleen Traylor, Gregg Vigil, and Teri Westerman Wagner) from the Boettcher School in Denver, Colorado founded Phamaly in 1989. They all shared a frustration for the lack of theatrical opportunities for individuals with disabilities from all identities—racial, ethnic, gender, and class. Beginning in 1990 with their first show Guys and Dolls, the art company has reimagined their work to maintain the principle of inclusion. The spacial and structural challenges characteristic of American theatres persisted in the company's early days as it was founded before the Americans with Disabilities Act was passed.

PTC performed shows that were traditionally not about disability, such as Oklahoma!, The Wiz, and Joseph and the Amazing Technicolor Democrat in order to "reframe the audience's thinking about what it means to have a disability." Their shows presented the actors as "real" people who face the realities of disability, stretching the able-bodied limitations of the traditional shows. Although PTC is now the leader in theatre with disabled artists, they struggled to be seen as a serious company because their approach is about the normalcy of disability, something not yet represented in current spaces.

== History (1992–2007) ==
In their successful debut at the Denver Center for Performing Arts (DCPA) with Anything Goes (1992), PTC entered a prevailing community partnership with the DCPA. After their tenth show – Side Show (1999) – Denver Mayor's Award for Excellence in Arts and Culture is awarded to PTC. In 2003, The Pajama Game received the Denver Post Ovation Award for Best Choreography (Debbie Stark).

At the turn of the new year, Steve Wilson stepped into the art company as the new artistic director, implementing a new direction for PTC while maintaining inclusivity. Along with Wilson's appointment, PTC's second production of Guys and Dolls (2004) received the Westword Award for Best Supporting Actress in a Musical (Lucy Roucis). 2005 came with even more recognition for PTC as Joseph and the Amazing Technicolor Dreamcoat (2005) received the Denver Post Ovation Award for Best Musical and Best Director (Steve Wilson) as well as the Colorado Theatre Guild Henry Award for Outstanding Direction of a Musical (Steve Wilson).

On August 29, 2006, Phamaly was featured in a lengthy segment of The News Hour with Jim Lehrer on PBS. This marked the company's first mainstream national publicity. Previous to that, Phamaly is also the subject of a documentary short entitled We Are PHAMALY directed by Daniel Junge. Long-time company member Mark Dissette made a feature-length documentary, There's Still Hope for Dreams (A PHAMALy Story) (2008). In 2007, PTC debuted their first non-musical Our Town (2007) in the Aurora Fox Arts Center which begins a 10-year partnership between the two organizations. That same year, PTC received the Colorado Theatre Guild Henry Award for Outstanding Actress in a Musical (Juliet Villa), Outstanding Lighting Design (Stephen D. Mazzeno), Outstanding Choreography (Debbie Stark, Cindy Bray) and Outstanding Direction of a Musical (Steve Wilson) for Urinetown the Musical (2007).

== Theatre accessibility ==
Phamaly Theatre company provides various accommodations to its performers in order to make theatre more accessible. The actors are offered these accommodations from the get-go, as they are stated on casting calls.

To make the audition process more accessible for neurodivergent people, Phamaly Theatre Company provides detailed information about what to expect at their facilities. This information is provided on their website and includes pictures to give cast members a heads up about sensory information such as what colors to expect. Further Phamaly Theatre's The Wiz makes the stage more accessible by allowing the actor to explore creative liberty with their disability such as using it as a metaphor, instead of labeling it as distracting for the audience.

Phamaly theatre contrasts with other disability theatres because their aim is producing traditional works while other theatre companies center disability in their narratives. In its founding, the theatre company did not focus on making social commentary about disabilities and they continue to view their social impact as a result that comes with their main goal, making theatre accessible. Phamaly theatre's style is that of Bertolt Brecht which is described as alienating the audience instead of alienating the actor and their disabilities. The goal of the Brecht model is to make the audience think critically about their presumptions about disabilities. Regular attendees of the Phamaly Theatre Company claim that the performers' disabilities go to the back of their minds as they watch performances until the script requires them to consider the experience of inaccessibility.

== 2007–2022 ==
Since the fall of 2008, PTC produced a series of sketch comedy productions entitled Vox Phamalia. Performed by Phamaly artists, these cabaret-style shows consist of original comedic, dramatic, and musical material written in a workshop over several weeks before being performed. The 2011 version – Vox Phamalia: Quadrapalooza – received numerous awards and nominations from Denver theatre critics, including one for Best Director for Edith Weiss, who originated the Vox Phamalia series.

Year after year, PTC continued to win community awards. 2012 saw another original comedy series titled disLabled marked the company's debut appearance in the city of Boulder, Colorado, and recurred for two years in 2013 and 2014. Then, as Bryce Alexander took over as artistic director, Phamaly traveled to Osaka, Japan to present its first international performance The Fantasticks (2015). The production won Denver Mayor's Award for Excellence in Arts and Culture. In 2016, Regan Linton became the first person with a disability to be artistic director as well as the "first wheelchair user to head a major U.S. theatre company".

Through the development of Morph Masters: How Disability Made Famous Artists Awesome! (2019), PTC collaborated with Phamaly actors to present a show that focuses on famous artists who live(d) and work(ed) with a disability. PTC was awarded Best Theater for the Classics by Best of Denver 2020 Westword. With the onset of the COVID-19 pandemic, PTC stayed resilient. Utilizing the unpredictability and adaptability of the disabled experience became their advantage, PTC created accessible and inclusive online programming for artists and audiences. Along with the launch reading salons which gave Phamaly actors the change to read classic and contemporary works, the art company also developed a web series known as Rewrite- which views classics from a disability perspective.

== Phamaly success stories ==
Two members of Phamaly – Regan Linton and Jason Dorwart – have gone on to earn, respectively, a Master of Fine Arts degree in acting and a PhD in Theatre and Drama, both through the University of California, San Diego. In fact, Regan Linton was the first actor in a wheelchair admitted into this MFA at UCSD. Linton went on to become the first wheelchair user to be cast as a company member of the Oregon Shakespeare Festival and currently serves as Phamaly's Artistic Director. Dorwart is now assistant professor of Global Theatre Studies at Hong Kong Baptist University after spending four years as visiting assistant professor of theater at Oberlin College. In addition, Laura Alsum, one of the original Vox Phamalia actors/writers, completed the Masters program for screenwriting at UCLA where she won the Tribeca Sloan Student Grand Jury Prize for Screenwriting. Long-time Phamaly member Lucy Roucis was featured doing her stand-up comedy act about Parkinson's disease in the 2010 romantic comedy Love & Other Drugs. Long-time company member Jeremy Palmer earned his MFA in Screenwriting from the University of Southern California and went on to win the Tribeca Sloan Student Grand Jury Prize in 2018.

== Inclusion ==
As PTC values access and inclusion, the company provides accommodations that are not often seen in other theatre companies. For example, during the audition process, PTC provides actors with materials in braille and American Sign Language upon request, viewing events to explore the space, and neutral readers to assist in cold readings. In addition, PTC hosts post-show talkbacks with their audiences where actors laugh and connect with audiences who feel uncomfortable or unfamiliar with disabilities. Through the process of show production, accommodations have created a humanizing and de-sensitized space for disability.

In addition, PTC manipulates the stage in innovative ways to place disability onstage. Urinetown, the Musical! is a prime example of the "provocative" productions which showcase the actors' differences and capabilities. For example, Steve Wilson's decision to incorporate a blind chorus line during the song "Mr. Cladwell," acquired a new meaning to an "ensemble" as performers helped one another to enter, exit, and change positions. The scenic design of the stage was also carefully and creatively calculated for the disabled actors, reimagining artistically the stigmatization of disability. By considering sight-line issues, the designers painted two traps with the prominent wheelchair logo, acting as a public pay toilet. As actors rolled over the traps, they were lowered to be in partial view of the audience to "empty their colostomy bag," thereby commenting on the daily realities and privacy concerns of those with physical disabilities.

== Production history (1990–2019) ==
Previous Phamaly productions have included:

- Guys and Dolls (1990)
- Oklahoma! (1991)
- Anything Goes (1992)
- Kiss Me, Kate (1993)
- Fiddler on the Roof (1994)
- How to Succeed in Business Without Really Trying (1995)
- A Funny Thing Happened on the Way to the Forum (1996)
- Mame (1997)
- The Boy Friend (1998)
- Side Show (1999)
- Grand Hotel (2000)
- Damn Yankees (2001)
- Once Upon a Mattress (2002)
- The Pajama Game (2003)
- Guys and Dolls (2004)
- Joseph and the Amazing Technicolor Dreamcoat (2005)
- The Wiz (2006)
- Our Town (2007)
- Urinetown: the Musical (2007)
- One Flew Over the Cuckoo's Nest (2008)
- Side Show (2008)
- Vox Phamalia: Tales from the Crips (2008)
- Stand Up for Democracy (2008)
- Steel Magnolias (2009)
- Man of La Mancha (2009)
- Vox Phamalia: Redux (2009)
- Barefoot in the Park (2010)
- Beauty and the Beast (2010)
- Vox Phamalia: Triage (2010)
- The Diviners (2011)
- How to Succeed in Business Without Really Trying (2011)
- Vox Phamalia: Quadrapalooza (2011)
- The Elephant Man (2012)
- Cyrano, an adaptation by Joe Roets of Cyrano de Bergerac (2012 touring production)
- disLabled (2012)
- Little Shop of Horrors (2012)
- Vox Phamalia: Cinco de Vox (2012)
- The Foreigner (2013)
- disLabled: Improvise, Adapt, & Overact (2013)
- Fiddler on the Roof (2013)
- Vox Phamalia: G.I.M.P. Nation (2013)
- It's a Wonderful Life (2013)
- The Velveteen Rabbit (2013 touring production)
- The Glass Menagerie (2014)
- disLabled: Disorderly Conduct (2014)
- Joseph and the Amazing Technicolor Dreamcoat (2014)
- Vox Phamalia: Pity Pity Bang Bang (2014)
- Rapunzel (2014 touring production)
- The Fantasticks (2015) Toured to Osaka, Japan
- Baby With the Bathwater (2015)
- Red Riding Hood (2015)
- Fuddy Meers (2016)
- Taking Leave (2016)
- Evita (2016)
- James and the Giant Peach (2016)
- Pygmalion (2017)
- A Midsummer Night's Dream: Workshop Production (2017)
- Annie (2017)
- VOX: Under Construction (2017)
- Romeo and Juliet: Workshop Production (2018)
- Into the Woods (2018)
- Harvey (2018)
- Morph Masters: How Disability Made Famous Artists Awesome! (2019)
- Phamaly 30th Anniversary Concert (2019)
- Summer Musical TBA (2019)
- Come to Your Senses Play Festival (2019)
