= Michael Nehls =

German doctor of medicine, author and cyclist

Michael Nehls (born October 20, 1962) is a German doctor of medicine, author, and former competitive cyclist]. From 1983 until 1989 he studied medicine at the universities of Freiburg and Heidelberg. In 1997, he attained his postdoctoral lecture qualification in molecular genetics. Nehls has authored over 50 scientific publications, two of which were published with the Nobel Prize winners Paul Greengard and Martin Evans.

== Career ==
In 2003, after a career in scientific research and upper management, the former marathon runner decided - after 20 years of a sedentary lifestyle - to reconnect with a serious sport.

In 2008, after having successfully competed in several long-distance cycling events, he finished the Race Across America in 10 days, 22 hours and 56 minutes to cover a distance of 3.000 miles between Oceanside, California, and Annapolis, Maryland. Out of 27 solo-participants he finished in seventh position. Nehls devised a new regenerative strategy and rested for a total of over 90 hours, several times more than his competitors. He wrote a book about his experience called "Herausforderung Race Across America" ("Challenge Race Across America") and produced a DVD called 'Du musst nicht siegen, um zu gewinnen. (English translation: "You need no victory to be a winner") on his own.

Since 2011, Nehls has published several books on the necessary behavioral changes required for healthy aging from an evolutionary history point of view. First "The Methuselah-Strategy" then with Alzheimer-Lüge (English translation: "The Alzheimer's Lie") and Alzheimer ist heilbar (English translation: "Alzheimer's can be cured") two books about Alzheimer's disease, in which he presents his theory about the development of this special form of dementia from evolutionary history of life and systems biology point of view.

The German biochemist Christian Haass criticized Nehls' statements on Alzheimer's disease for the Alzheimer-Gesellschaft München (Munich Alzheimer Society) in 2015 as misleading and harmful for those affected, that behavior and preventive measures did have an influence on the onset and progression of the disease. In principle, however, Alzheimer's disease cannot be prevented in this way. “Preventing Alzheimer’s disease simply through a correct lifestyle” is “too nice a pipe dream” and “does not do justice to the 1.2 million people affected in Germany.” Such claims are “well suited for pseudo-scientific treatises, but they are... On closer inspection, it only serves the author’s vanity.” In 2021, the bioethiciane Silke Schicktanz described Nehls as a “popular science author”, whose content is more or less ignored by the scientific mainstream, with his focus on prediction and preventing dementia (as opposed to curing it) is illustrative of the contemporary discourse in Germany on the topic.

Dr. Nehls' article titled "Unified theory of Alzheimer's disease (UTAD): implications for prevention and curative therapy" was internationally published in the Journal of Molecular Psychiatry. And for his breakthrough discovery regarding the development, prevention and therapy of Alzheimer's disease, he received the 2015 Hanse-Award for Psychiatry from the University of Rostock, Germany.

== Controversies and criticism ==
Nehls' book The Indoctrinated Brain has sparked considerable controversy for its bold claims about the effects of mRNA COVID-19 vaccines on human cognition and autonomy. Nehls suggests that these vaccines, among other modern pressures, are part of a global assault manipulating the human mind, aiming to facilitate increased governmental control over individuals. His theories align with broader conspiratorial narratives, which have been disseminated through various platforms known for hosting such content.

Nehls' work was featured in a discussion with Tucker Carlson, where he outlined his views on the manipulation of human memory and cognition through fear, suggesting a deliberate effort to control the populace. Furthermore, Nehls' theories have been cited by conspiratorial outlets such as Infowars in an article called "Molecular Geneticist Explains How mRNA Vaccines Were Designed to Conquer the Human Mind", further associating his work with fringe narratives.

Moreover, The Indoctrinated Brain was published by Skyhorse Publishing, a company that has a record of publishing works with conspiratorial angles. Skyhorse Publishing has built a reputation for taking on authors that other publishers avoid, including figures who have propagated misinformation such as false theories about coronavirus vaccines.

== Books ==
- Studien zur Phylogenese cardialer Hormone bei Vertebraten und Evertebraten. Uni Heidelberg, Dissertation 1989.
- Molekulargenetische Mechanismen der Thymusentwicklung. med. Hochschule Hannover, Habilitationsschrift 1996.
- Herausforderung Race Across America: 4800 km Zeitfahren von Küste zu Küste. Delius Klasing, 2008, ISBN 978-3-7688-5283-8.
- Die Methusalem-Strategie. Vermeiden, was uns daran hindert, gesund älter und weiser zu werden. Mental Enterprises, 2011, ISBN 978-3-9814048-3-8.
- Herausforderung Race Across America: 4800 km Zeitfahren von Küste zu Küste. Überarbeitet und aktualisiert und mit neuem Bildmaterial, Mental Enterprises, 2012, ISBN 978-3-9814048-5-2
- Die Alzheimer-Lüge: Die Wahrheit über eine vermeidbare Krankheit. Heyne, 2014, ISBN 978-3-453-20069-2
- Alzheimer ist heilbar. Rechtzeitig zurück in ein gesundes Leben. Heyne, 2015, ISBN 978-3-453-20100-2.
- Demenz vorbeugen. Mediterran essen. Fona, 2017, ISBN 978-3-03780-619-7
- Kopfküche. Das Anti-Alzheimer-Kochbuch. Systemed, 2017, ISBN 978-3-95814-084-4
- Die Formel gegen Alzheimer. Die Gebrauchsanweisung für ein gesundes Leben - Ganz einfach vorbeugen und rechtzeitig heilen. Heyne, 2018, ISBN 978-3-453-20275-7
- Algenöl. Die Ernährungsrevolution aus dem Meer. Heyne, 2018, ISBN 978-3-453-60493-3
- Das Corona Syndrom. Wie das Virus unsere Schwächen offenlegt – und wie wir uns nachhaltig schützen können. Heyne, 2021, ISBN 3-453-60611-6.
- Das erschöpfte Gehirn. Der Ursprung unserer mentalen Energie – und warum sie schwindet Willenskraft, Kreativität und Fokus zurückgewinnen. Heyne, 2022, ISBN 978-3-453-21813-0.
- Herdengesundheit: Der Weg aus der Corona-Krise und die natürliche Alternative zum globalen Impfprogramm. Mental Enterprises, 2022, ISBN 978-3-9814048-7-6.
- The Indoctrinated Brain: How to Successfully Fend Off the Global Attack on Your Mental Freedom. Skyhorse Publishing, 2023, ISBN 978-1-5107783-6-8.

== DVDs ==
- Du musst nicht siegen, um zu gewinnen. 2010, ISBN 978-3-9814048-0-7.
- Gipfel der Freiheit – Herausforderung Kilimanjaro. 2011, ISBN 3-9814048-4-X.
