= OpenStage Theatre and Company =

Theatre company in Colorado, US

OpenStage Theatre & Company
- Formation: 1973
- Type: Theatre group
- Purpose: Stage
- Location: Fort Collins, Colorado
- Website: http://www.openstage.com/

OpenStage Theatre & Company, Inc. is a theatre company in northern Colorado.

== Formation ==
Since its inception in 1973, OpenStage has actively produced and promoted live performing arts in Northern Colorado, making it one of the longest-practicing theatrical producers in the state. In addition to being the foremost local producer at the Fort Collins Lincoln Center, the city's primary performance space, OpenStage is a figure in the statewide arts producing community.

== Work ==
OpenStage Theatre produces a season of six productions, each performing for five weeks.
