= Town Hall Arts Center =

Historic theater in Coloardo, United States

- Town Hall Arts Center, formerly the Littleton Town Hall
- U.S. National Register of Historic Places
- Colorado State Register of Historic Properties
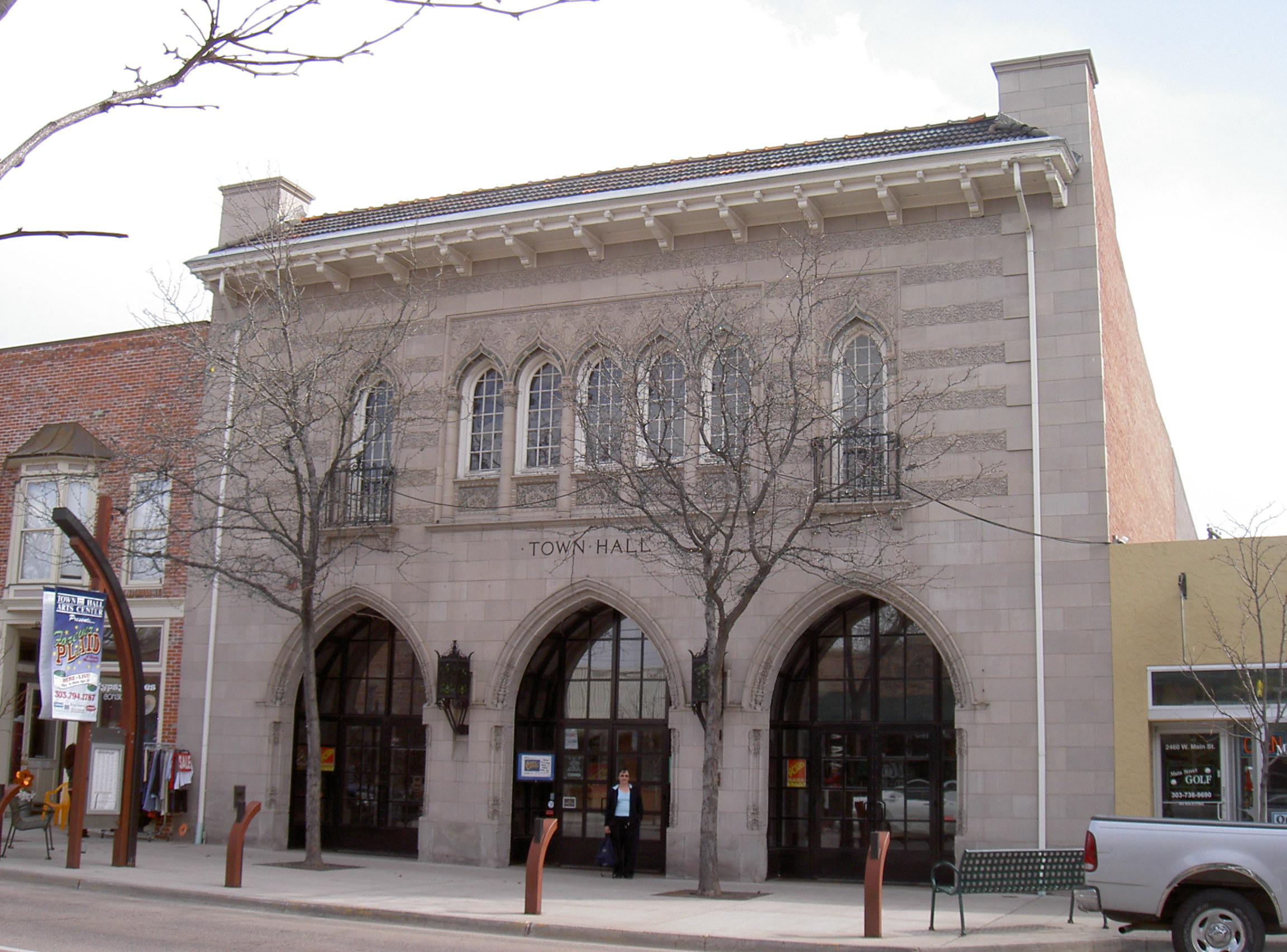

- Location within Colorado Location within the United States
- Location: 2450 W. Main St., Littleton, Colorado
- Coordinates: 39°36′48″N 105°0′59″W
- Area: 0.2 acres (0.1 ha)
- Built: 1920
- Architect: Jacques Benedict
- Architectural style: Italianate
- Website: townhallartscenter.org
- NRHP reference No.: 80000876
- CSRHP No.: 5AH.161
- Added to NRHP: September 4, 1980

Town Hall Arts Center, formerly the Littleton Town Hall, is located in downtown Littleton, Colorado and has been a local professional theater, producing comedies, musicals and plays to the Denver metropolitan area for over 30 years. The building was designated a National Register of Historic Places on September 4, 1980.

== Littleton Town Hall (1920–1977) ==
Designed by Colorado architect Jacques Benedict and built in 1920 as a new center for civic activities, the Italianate building contained the treasurer's office, council chambers, fire truck and hose rooms, and a large second-floor auditorium. The design was inspired by the Palazzo della Ragione in Vicenza, northern Italy, yet it has American elements like an eagle in the lunettes over the second story windows and the Colorado state flower, the Columbine on the facade.

The floor plan was modified beginning in the 1950s to add offices. The Town Hall was one of the first buildings designated under the historic preservation ordinance in 1972. A new office building was occupied by the City of Littleton in 1977. Through fundraising and other efforts, it opened as a performing arts center and art gallery in 1983.

== Town Hall Arts Center (since 1983) ==
Town Hall Arts Center is now a live theater, cultural center, and art gallery, offering six main stage musicals or comedies and seven to eight concerts during the September through June production season. The theater program for children produces two shows annually with professional actors. Classes are held throughout the year for students aged seven to seventeen in stage craft, acting, and creative dramatics.
