= Buntport Theater =

Non-profit professional theater group based in Denver, Colorado

Buntport Theater Company
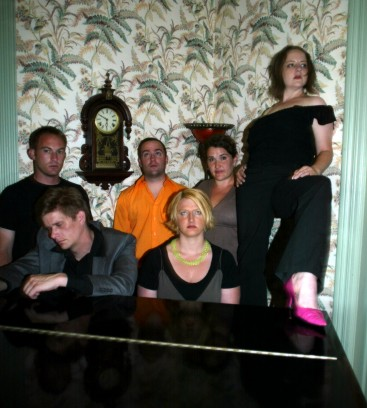
- Buntport Theater Company
- Formation: 1990s
- Type: Theatre group
- Location: Denver, Colorado
- Members: Brian Colonna; Hannah Duggan; Erik Edborg; Erin Rollman; Samantha Schmitz
- Website: buntport.com

Buntport Theater Company is a non-profit professional theater group in Denver, Colorado. The company creates and produces original works and adaptations through a collaborative team approach without officially designated positions for writers, directors, or designers.

The core members currently include Brian Colonna, Hannah Duggan, Erik Edborg, Erin Rollman, and Samantha Schmitz. Co-founder Evan Weissman transitioned to focus on a "civic health club" called Warm Cookies of the Revolution in 2013.

The Company welcomes visual and performing artists from various locations, including Philadelphia, New York City, Seattle, and Australia, to perform for Denver audiences.

== History ==
The members of Bundport Theater Company began collaborating while attending Colorado College in Colorado Springs in the late 1990s. Their first performance, "Quixote," was staged in July 1998.

The company initially produced a few shows and toured theaters, schools, and fringe theatre festivals. In 2000, they transformed a cement warehouse into a fully operational black box theater with adaptable seating. As of 2022, Buntport has staged 45 mainstage productions and 100 episodes of two "live sitcoms" (Magnets on the Fridge and Starship Troy). They also present an all-ages live comic book show, tRUNks, which has produced over 40 installments.

Buntport has received over 75 awards, including the Denver's Mayor Award in 2010.

== Special Productions ==
Buntport has defined its mission as providing high-quality programming, keeping ticket prices affordable, and ensuring audience engagement.

To foster regular audience participation, Buntport introduced a live sitcom format. Over six months, they debuted a new episode of a "sitcom" every other Tuesday and Wednesday night, complete with commercial breaks and summer reruns. Each episode was crafted based on an audience suggestion from the previous episode and often featured guest stars from the Denver theater scene.

The inaugural sitcom production, Magnets on the Fridge, gained a devoted following, earning numerous accolades from the media and critics. It ran for five seasons before being succeeded by Starship Troy, which had a successful three-season run.

Buntport brought their live sitcoms to a close on December 31, 2008, with the airing of the 100th episode of the show.

== tRUNks ==
The Buntport ensemble, drawing from the style of their live sitcom, has developed and presents a family-friendly live comic book named tRUNks. This production, which runs on alternate Saturdays, is produced by Buntport and occasionally features ensemble members as guest stars. tRUNks is scripted and performed by Jessica Robblee, Mitch Slevc, and Matt Zambrano. It has received recognition for outstanding children's theater from notable Colorado publications and the Colorado Theatre Guild.

== Productions (chronological) ==
Buntport Theater Company produces a minimum of two original plays annually. The following is a list of original plays performed by the Buntport Theater with premiere dates.

- Quixote (July, 1998)
- “...and this is my significant bother.” (March, 2001) – Based on nine short stories by James Thurber.
- Word-Horde: an adaptation of sorts of Beowulf (March, 2001)
- Fin (June, 2001)
- Ward #6 (August, 2001) – Adaptation of a short story by Anton Chekhov.
- Donner: A Documentary (December, 2001)
- Titus Andronicus: The Musical! (May, 2002)
- The Odyssey: A Walking Tour (October, 2002)
- The 30th of Baydak (June, 2003) – Inspired by the novel Too Loud a Solitude.
- Elevator (September, 2003)
- < Cinderella (September, 2003) – An adaptation of Cinderella.
- Idiot Box (December, 2003) – Sketch comedy based on television.
- McGuinn & Murry (January, 2004)
- MacBlank (October, 2004) – Inspired by MacBeth.
- Kafka On Ice (October, 2004)
- Horror: The Transformation (October, 2005) – Adaptation of Wieland: or, The Transformation: An American Tale.
- Realism: The Mythical Brontosaurus (October, 2005)
- A Synopsis Of Butchery (April, 2006)
- Something is Rotten (September, 2006) – Interpretation of Hamlet.
- Winter in Graupel Bay (December, 2006)
- Moby Dick Unread (April, 2007)
- Vote For Uncle Marty (September, 2007)
- Musketeer (August, 2008) – Based the novel The Three Musketeers.
- Anywhere But Rome (November, 2008) – Based on Ovid.
- Seal. Stamp. Send. Bang. (March, 2009)
- The Squabble (May, 2009) - Based on the Gogol short story
- Indiana, Indiana (September, 2009) – An adaptation of the novel by Laird Hunt.
- The World is Mine (February, 2010)
- Jugged Rabbit Stew (June, 2010)
- My Hideous Progeny (September, 2011)
- Tommy Lee Jones Goes to Opera Alone (March, 2012)
- The Roast Beef Situation (May, 2012)
- Sweet Tooth (October, 2012)
- Wake (January, 2013), based on William Shakespeare’s The Tempest
- A Knight to Remember- My Quest to Gallantly Recapture the Past by Brian Colonna (April, 2013)
- Electra Onion Eater (November, 2013) – Based on Sophocles’ Electra.
- Jugged Rabbit Stew (February, 2014)
- Peggy Jo and the Desolate Nothing (May, 2014)
- Naughty Bits (September, 2014)
- Middle Aged People Sitting in Boxes (April, 2015)
- 10 Myths on the Proper Application of Beauty Products (March, 2016)
- The Rembrandt Room (April, 2016)
- Greetings from Camp Katabasis (May, 2016)
- Middle Aged People Sitting In Boxes (September, 2016)
- The Zeus Problem (February, 2017)
- The Crud (May, 2017)
- Edgar Allan Poe Is Dead and So Is My Cat (October, 2017)
- The Book Handlers (February 2018) – Inspired by a short story by Brian O’Nolan.
- Remembering A Knight To Remember (April, 2018)
- Coyote. Badger. Rattlesnake. (November, 2018)
- Universe 92 (September, 2019)
- 3×3 Projects: Rocky Mountain Locusts (December, 2020)
- The Grasshoppers (October, 2020)
- Buntport Bored Post Society Society! (September, 2020)
- Cabaret De Profundis or How To Sing While Ugly Crying (January, 2021) – A filmed stage production.
- Space People In Space (May, 2021)
- Cabaret De Profundis, or How to Sing While Ugly Crying (October, 2021)
- ♥️ Richard (April, 2022) – Buntport Theater's 50th collaboratively-created, full-length play
- Public Domain Theatre Festival (June, 2022)
- The Death of Napoleon: A Play in Less Than Three Acts (January, 2023)
- Best Town (May, 2023)

== Awards ==
- The American Theatre Wing's 2011 National Theatre Company Grant
- Westword Reader's Choice 2008:
  - “Best Theater Season”
  - Moby Dick Unread “Best Theater Production”
- Outfront Magazine Marlowe Awards 2007:
  - Moby Dick Unread “Best Production - Comedy”
- KMGH-TV A*List 2007:
  - “Best Live Theater”
- Alliance For Colorado Theatre:
  - “Theater Company of the Year”
- Denver Post 2007 Ovation Awards:
  - tRUNks “Best Children's Show”
- 5280 Magazine Reader's Choice 2007:
  - “Top Dance/Arts/Theater Company”
- Colorado Theatre Guild Henry Awards:
  - Something Is Rotten “Outstanding New Play”
- Westword Best of Denver 2007:
  - “Best Theater Season”
  - A Synopsis of Butchery “Best Original Play”
  - A Synopsis of Butchery “Best Set - Small Theater”
- Denver Post 2006 Ovation Awards:
  - “Best Year for a Company” Something Is Rotten “Best Comedy”
- Westword Mastermind Award 2005:
  - “Innovation in the Performing Arts”
- Westword Best of Denver 2005:
  - Kafka On Ice “Best Experimental Play”
- Rocky Mountain News Top Of The Rocky 2004:
  - “Top Playwright”
- Denver Post 2003 Ovation Awards:
  - Misc. “Best New Work”
  - “Best Sound Design, The 30th of Baydak”
- Westword Reader's Choice 2003:
  - “Best Season”
  - Titus Adronicus! The Musical “Best Production”
- Rocky Mountain News Top Of The Rocky 2003: “Top Theater Company”
