= Aurora Fox Arts Center =

Performing arts center in Aurora, Colorado

Coordinates: 39°44′23″N 104°52′21″W

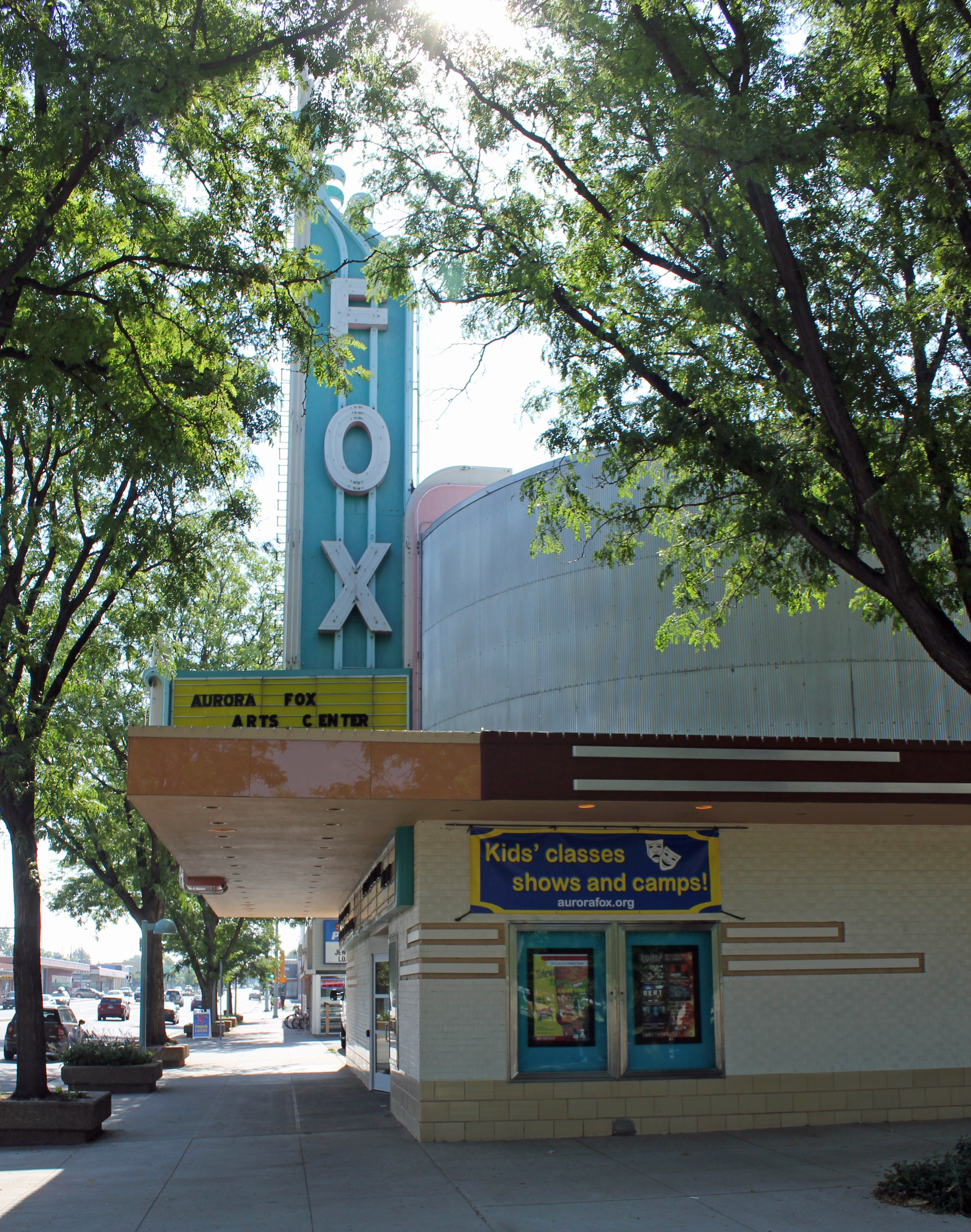
- Aurora Fox Arts Center (Aurora, CO)
- Interactive map of Aurora Fox Arts Center
- Address: 9900 E Colfax Ave; Aurora, CO United States
- Operator: City of Aurora, Colorado - Library and Cultural Services Department
- Capacity: 245
- Type: Performance Arts Venue
- Event: Theater / Dance / Film / Music

Construction
- Built: 1946
- Renovated: 1985

The Aurora Fox Arts Center is located at 9900 E Colfax Avenue in Aurora, Colorado in the Aurora Cultural Arts District. It is the City of Aurora's performing arts center run by the City of Aurora Cultural Services Division and supported by the many theater-goers.

== Building ==
Originally a movie theater, the building first opened on October 30, 1946. The building, a modified Quonset hut, was first used for military purposes at the nearby Lowry Army Air Force Base.

== Resident organizations ==
- Aurora Symphony Orchestra - As of October 2017, the Aurora Fox Arts Center once again became the home of the Aurora Symphony Orchestra (ASO).
