= Arvada Center for the Arts and Humanities =

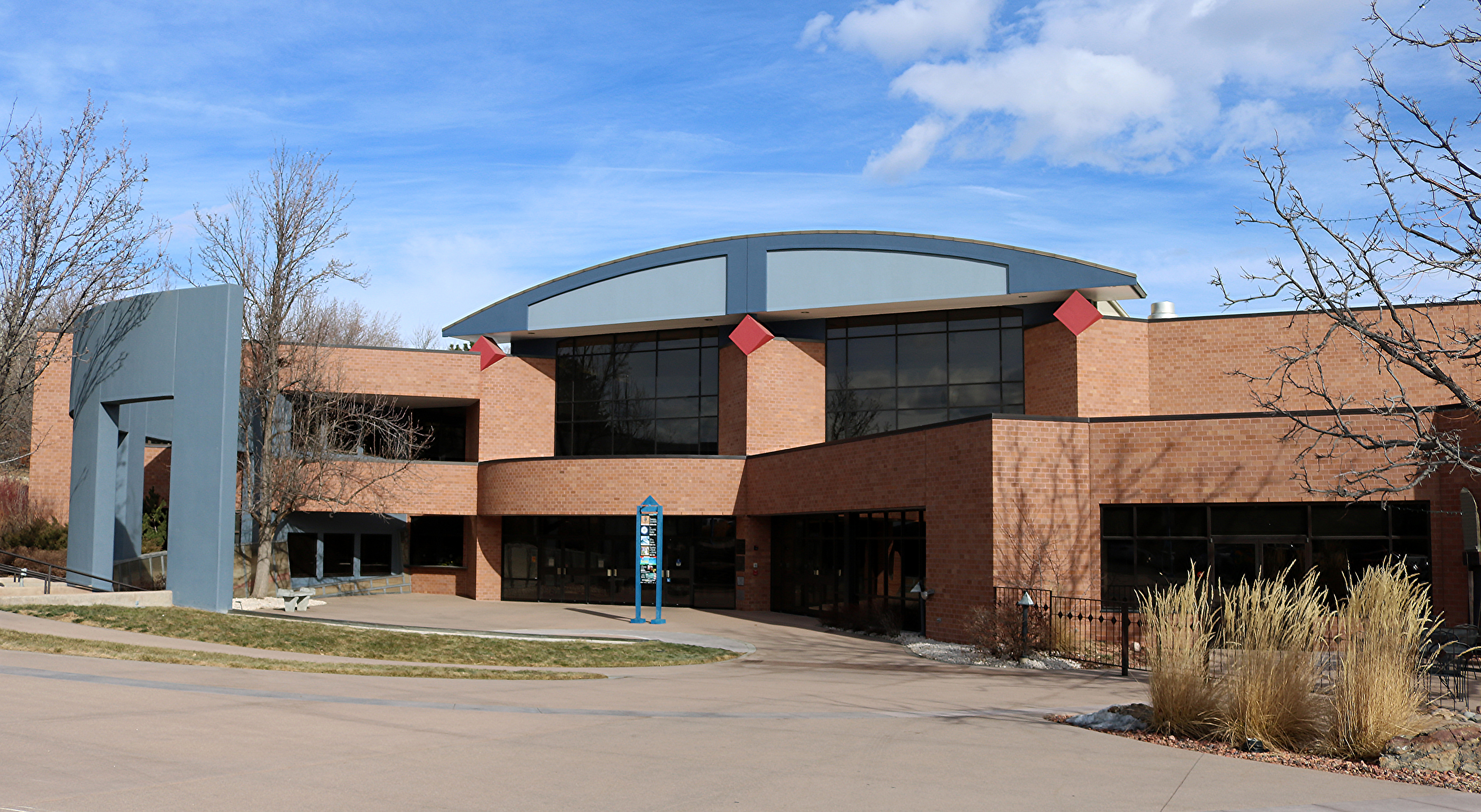
- The Arvada Center's main entrance area.
- Established: 1976
- Location: 6901 Wadsworth Blvd. Arvada, Colorado
- Coordinates: 39.823252°N 105.083531°W
- Type: Arts center
- Website: arvadacenter.org

The Arvada Center for the Arts and Humanities is a nonprofit, multi-use cultural facility in Arvada, Colorado, United States, which opened in 1976. The Arvada Center facility comprises the Arvada History Museum, three theatres, 10,000 square feet of art galleries, music, dance, and theatre rehearsal rooms, classrooms, a conference center, and an amphitheater.

== Facility ==
Located 7.8 miles northwest of Denver, the Arvada Center for the Arts and Humanities is the thirteenth largest cultural attraction in the Denver metro area, and Colorado's third-largest theatre company. The Arvada Center comprises the Arvada History Museum, three theatres, 10,000 square feet of art galleries, music, dance, and theater rehearsal rooms, classrooms, a conference center, and an amphitheater.

The center offers classes in the visual and performing arts for people of all ages. The Arvada Center runs a summer theater program, composed of several stage plays and musicals performed by various companies, both run by the center, as well as independently.

The center is also home to the Front Range Youth Symphony Orchestra, which provides a community orchestra for school-age students. It has welcomed students for over 10 years.

== Expansion ==
After the Center opened there was demand for more space. In 1992 a major expansion was approved, and this nearly doubled the size of the center. In December 2002 another expansion was approved, this expansion was designed by Fentress Bradburn Architects LTD at a cost of $69 million. Fentress Bradburn Architects Ltd. proposed this major expansion be carried out in two phases, but on October 4, 2004, the Arvada City Council voted to complete it in three phases.

The first phase included the completion of a small theater initially built in 1992, increasing the ballroom/conference facility seating from 500 to 750, providing storage space for hospitality services, providing rehearsal and storage space for performing arts, increasing exhibition space for the history museum and additional collection storage, refurbishing the existing interior, and modifying site work including exterior lighting and signage upgrades. Phase 2 was completed in 2006 and it included construction of a new performing-arts shop, dedicated rehearsal space and self-contained dressing rooms with showers. New patios and gathering spots dot the area outside.

The second phase also saw expansion of the art gallery and history museum, improvements to the ballroom, additional rest- rooms, landscaping and 60 new parking spaces.

Phase 3 will not be completed until 2018.

== See also ==
- State of Colorado
  - Jefferson County, Colorado
    - Arvada, Colorado
