= Deaths in February 2006 =

The following is a list of notable deaths in February 2006.

Entries for each day are listed alphabetically by surname. A typical entry lists information in the following sequence:

- Name, age, country of citizenship at birth, subsequent country of citizenship (if applicable), reason for notability, cause of death (if known), and reference.

== February 2006 ==
=== 1 ===
- Roy Alon, 63, British stuntman (Die Another Day, Willow, 101 Dalmatians), heart attack.
- Dick Bass, 68, American football player (Los Angeles Rams) and radio analyst.
- Dick Brooks, 63, American NASCAR race car driver and radio broadcaster, heart attack.
- Ronald B. Cameron, 78, American politician, U.S. Representative from California (1963–1967).
- Robin Donkin, 78, British historian and geographer.
- Ernest Dudley, 97, British novelist, journalist, screenwriter, actor, radio broadcaster.
- Sam Goddard Jr., 86, American politician, Governor of Arizona 1965–1967.
- Carlson Gracie, 72, Brazilian martial artist, complications from kidney stones.
- Bryce Harland, 74, New Zealand diplomat, Permanent Representative to the United Nations (1982–1985), High Commissioner to the United Kingdom (1985–1991).
- Barry Harris, 67, Australian rugby league footballer.
- Shirley Maheu, 74, Canadian politician.
- Jean-Philippe Maitre, 56, Swiss politician, former President of the Swiss National Council, brain tumor.
- Jake Wade, 93, American baseball player.
- John Woollam, 78, British politician, former Conservative Member of Parliament.

=== 2 ===
- Lo Hartog van Banda, 89, Dutch comics writer.
- Ken Brogan, 78, Australian rugby league footballer.
- Armando Castillo, 73, Guatemalan Olympic cyclist (1952).
- Jill Chaifetz, 41, American lawyer and executive director of the nonprofit legal group Advocates for Children of New York, ovarian cancer.
- Mizanur Rahman Chowdhury, 77, Bangladeshi politician, former prime minister of Bangladesh.
- Chris Doty, 39, Canadian documentarian and playwright, suicide by hanging.
- Guglielmo Letteri, 80, Italian comic book artist.
- Franco Rossi, 90, Italian ice hockey player and Olympian (1936, 1948).
- Pat Rupp, 63, American ice hockey player (Detroit Red Wings), and Olympian (1964, 1968), cancer.
- S. K. Ramachandra Rao, 78, Indian scholar.
- Kent Ryan, 91, American football player (Detroit Lions).
- Athol Shephard, 85, Australian cricketer.
- Nicholas Swarbrick, 107, English sailor, one of the last two surviving World War I Merchant Navy veterans.
- Sir Reginald Swartz, 94, Australian politician, Minister for Civil Aviation from 1966 to 1969.
- Chris Walton, 72, English cricketer.
- Stephen Worobetz, 91, Canadian politician, former lieutenant governor of Saskatchewan.

=== 3 ===
- Ustad Qawwal Bahauddin, 72, Indian-Pakistani Qawwali singer.
- Rufino Bernedo, 79, Chilean basketball player and Olympian (1952, 1956).
- Walerian Borowczyk, 82, Polish-born surrealist filmmaker, heart failure.
- Jean Byron, 80, American actress (The Patty Duke Show, The Many Loves of Dobie Gillis, Johnny Concho), infection following hip replacement surgery.
- Ernie Clements, 83, British road racing cyclist and Olympian (1948).
- Frank Ellis, 100, British radiologist.
- Frank Goodman, 89, American Broadway press agent, congestive heart failure.
- Lou Jones, 74, American Olympic runner (1956).
- Sonny King, 83, American comedian-singer, Jimmy Durante's sidekick, cancer.
- Joe Klukay, 83, Canadian ice hockey player (Toronto Maple Leafs, Boston Bruins).
- Duma Kumalo, 48, South African human rights activist, one of the Sharpeville Six, film-maker and founding member of the Khulumani Support Group for victims of apartheid-related violence.
- Raymond Lesage, 88, French Olympic racewalker (1952).
- Al Lewis, 82, American actor (The Munsters, Car 54, Where Are You?, They Shoot Horses, Don't They?).
- Romano Mussolini, 78, Italian jazz musician and painter.
- Denne Bart Petitclerc, 76, American journalist, screenwriter, and friend of Ernest Hemingway.
- Reinhold Steingräber, 49, German Olympic wrestler (1980).
- Johnny Vaught, 96, American college football player, coach, and college athletics administrator, NCAA championship-winning University of Mississippi football coach.

=== 4 ===
- Jenő Dalnoki, 73, Hungarian football player, manager, and Olympian (1952, 1960).
- Friedrich Engel, 97, German Nazi SS officer.
- Betty Friedan, 85, American feminist and writer, congestive heart failure.
- William Augustus Jones Jr., 71, American Civil Rights pioneer.
- Barbara W. Leyden, 56, American palynologist and paleoecologist.
- Joe McGuff, 79, American sportswriter and newspaper editor, amyotrophic lateral sclerosis (Lou Gehrig's Disease).
- Elena Carter Richardson, 57, Mexican-born principal dancer and teacher, cancer.
- Jack Taylor, 60, once heaviest man in UK.
- Myron Waldman, 97, American animator (Betty Boop, Superman), congestive heart failure.

=== 5 ===
- Norma Candal, 75, Puerto Rican comedian, actress and drama teacher, head injury.
- Franklin Cover, 77, American actor (The Jeffersons, Wall Street, The Stepford Wives), pneumonia.
- Reuven Frank, 85, American TV journalism pioneer and former NBC News president, complications from pneumonia.
- Stuart Mason, 57, English footballer.
- Ray Owen, 65, English rugby league player and administrator.
- Peter Philp, 85, British dramatist and antiques expert.
- Sir Alberto Rodrigues, 94, Hong Kong physician and politician.

=== 6 ===
- John Brightman, Baron Brightman, 94, UK lawyer and former Lord of Appeal.
- Mario Condello, 53, Australian lawyer and gangland criminal, shot.
- Pedro Gonzalez Gonzalez, 80, American comedian and actor (Rio Bravo, The High and the Mighty, Dreamer), cancer.
- Stella Ross-Craig, 99, English illustrator, one of the most prodigious of flora illustrators.
- Esther Sandoval, 78, Puerto Rican actress.
- Karin Struck, 58, German writer, cancer.
- Kōji Totani, 57, Japanese voice actor (Fist of the North Star, Metal Gear, Dragon Ball Z), heart failure.

=== 7 ===
- Glenn Lee Benner II, 43, American convicted murderer, executed by lethal injection.
- Dürrüşehvar Sultan, 92, Ottoman princess.
- Sándor Garay, 86, Hungarian Olympic athlete (1948, 1952).
- George Millay, 76, American businessman and founder of SeaWorld, lung cancer.
- Gérald Piaget, 81, Swiss Olympic basketball player (1948).
- Max Rosenn, 96, American judge on the U.S. Court of Appeals for the Third Circuit (1970–2006).
- Mitchell Rupe, 51, American convicted murderer ruled too heavy to be hanged, liver disease.
- Alan Shalleck, 76, American television writer and director (Curious George), murdered.
- Olof Stolpe, 78, Finnish footballer and Olympian (1952).
- Alberto Terry, 76, Peruvian footballer.
- Lajos Varga, 72, Hungarian Olympic gymnast (1960, 1964).

=== 8 ===
- Larry Black, 54, American sprinter and Olympic medalist (1972), aneurysm.
- Gil Bouley, 84, American football player (Boston College Eagles, Cleveland/Los Angeles Rams).
- Haruhisa Chiba, 54, Japanese Olympic alpine skier (1972, 1976).
- Elton Dean, 60, English jazz saxophonist, heart and liver related problems.
- Michael Gilbert, 93, British mystery author and lawyer.
- Ron Greenwood, 84, British football manager, England national team, West Ham United.
- Akira Ifukube, 91, Japanese film composer (Godzilla).
- Mart Kenney, 95, Canadian jazz musician and bandleader, "Canada's Big Band King," complications from a fall.
- Kurt Orban, 89, American Olympic field hockey player (1948, 1956).
- Gigi Parrish, 93, American actress, later known as Katherine Weld.
- Kuljeet Randhawa, 30, Indian actress, suicide by hanging.
- David Stupich, 84, Canadian politician, member of the House of Commons of Canada (1988-1993).

=== 9 ===
- Phil Brown, 89, American actor (Star Wars, Calling Dr. Gillespie, Oppenheimer).
- Ibolya Csák, 91, Hungarian high jumper and Olympian (1936).
- Motoshi Fujita, 74, Japanese baseball player.
- Gilles Kahn, 59, French computer scientist.
- Sir Freddie Laker, 83, British entrepreneur, founder of Laker Airways.
- Nadira, 75, Indian Bollywood actress.
- Jorma Vaihela, 80, Finnish footballer and Olympian (1952).
- Laurie Z, 48, American musician, lung cancer.

=== 10 ===
- John Belluso, 36, American playwright, Engleman-Camurdrie syndrome.
- Josef Bělohradský, 79, Czech Olympic basketball player (1948).
- Fernando Brobró, 71, Brazilian Olympic basketball player (1960).
- Jill Fraser, 59, British theatre director, cancer.
- Dick Harmon, 58, American golfer and golf instructor.
- Knut-Olaf Haustein, 71, German physician.
- J Dilla 32, American hip hop record producer and MC, lupus nephritis.
- L.C. Joyner, 72, American football player (Oakland Raiders).
- Louis Moolman, 55, South African rugby union player (Bulls, national team), stroke.
- John Prentice, 79, Scottish football player and manager.
- Norman Shumway, 83, American surgeon, performed first U.S. heart transplant, lung cancer.
- Peter Smith, 65, British trade union leader, oesophageal cancer.
- Juan Soriano, 85, Mexican painter and sculptor.
- André Strappe, 77, French football player and Olympian (1948).

=== 11 ===
- Wendy Barnes, 89, British overseas radio broadcaster.
- Fred de Belin, 85, Australian rugby league footballer.
- Peter Benchley, 65, American author and screenwriter (Jaws, The Deep), pulmonary fibrosis.
- Peggy Cripps Appiah, 84, British-Ghanaian children's author.
- Ken Fletcher, 65, Australian tennis player, cancer.
- Rankin Johnson Jr., 88, American baseball player (Philadelphia Athletics).
- Jackie Pallo, 79, British professional wrestler, cancer.
- Altynbek Sarsenbayev, 43, Kazakh politician, former cabinet minister, assassinated.
- Harry Schein, 81, Austrian-born founder of Swedish Film Institute, author and columnist.
- Thomas A. Spragens, 88, American administrator, former president of Centre College.
- Harry Vines, 67, American wheelchair basketball coach.

=== 12 ===
- Lenny Dee, 83, American virtuoso organist.
- Henri Guédon, 61, French percussionist.
- Pamela O'Malley, 76, Irish-Spanish activist and educationalist and radical, stroke.
- Juan Sánchez-Navarro y Peón, 92, Mexican entrepreneur and co-founder of National Action Party.
- Roland Perret, 78, Swiss Olympic equestrian (1956).
- Kharis Yunichev, 74, Soviet Russian Olympic swimmer (1956).

=== 13 ===
- John Brooke-Little, 78, English author and officer of arms.
- Ilan Halimi, French Jew kidnapped and murdered by a gang from a banlieue. Possibly anti-Semitic murder.
- Jaakko Honko, 83, Finnish economist.
- Andreas Katsulas, 59, American actor (Babylon 5, The Fugitive, Star Trek: The Next Generation), lung cancer.
- Alan M. Levin, 79, American documentary filmmaker.
- Edna Lewis, 89, American author of cookbooks on Southern U.S. cuisine.
- Bud McFadin, 77, American football player (Los Angeles Rams, Denver Broncos, Houston Oilers).
- Curt Sandig, 87, American football player (Pittsburgh Steelers, Buffalo Bisons).
- Sir Peter Strawson, 86, British philosopher.
- Joseph Ujlaki, 76, Hungarian-born French football player.
- Wang Xuan, 70, Chinese academic and IT expert.

=== 14 ===
- Ramon Bagatsing, 89, Filipino politician, Mayor of Manila, cardiac arrest.
- Steve Bracey, 55, American basketball player (Atlanta Hawks, Golden State Warriors).
- Yehuda Chitrik, 106, Russian-born rabbi and Lubavitch storyteller.
- Darry Cowl, 80, French actor and pianist, lung cancer.
- Shoshana Damari, 83, Yemeni-born Israeli singer, "Queen of Israeli song," pneumonia.
- Michael G. Fitzgerald, 55, American film historian and author.
- Lynden David Hall, 31, British soul singer, Hodgkin's lymphoma.
- Tage Møller, 91, Danish Olympic cyclist (1936).
- Don Paarlberg, 94, American agricultural economics adviser to three U.S. Presidents.
- Michael Posner, 74, British economist.
- Putte Wickman, 81, Swedish jazz orchestra leader and clarinetist, cancer.

=== 15 ===
- Barbara Guest, 85, American poet of the New York School.
- Anna Marly, 88, Russian-born songwriter, France's "Troubadour of the Resistance.".
- Andrei Petrov, 75, Russian composer.
- Robert E. Rich Sr., 92, American businessman, creator of first non dairy whipped topping.
- Sun Yun-suan, 93, Chinese engineer and politician, former Premier of Republic of China, heart attack.
- Josip Vrhovec, 79, Croatian Yugoslav communist politician, former foreign minister of Yugoslavia.
- Lim Hock Soon, 41, murder victim who was shot to death in Singapore by former acquaintance and gangster Tan Chor Jin

=== 16 ===
- Paul Avrich, 74, American professor and historian of anarchism, Alzheimer's disease.
- Benno Besson, 83, Swiss stage director.
- Johnny Grunge, 40, American pro wrestler, sleep apnea complications.
- Sid Feller, 89, American music arranger, conductor and record producer.
- Dennis Kirkland, 63, British television producer and director, after a short illness.
- Adolfo Mazzini, 96, Italian Olympic basketball player (1936).
- Ernie Stautner, 80, German-born American football player (Pittsburgh Steelers) and member of the Pro Football Hall of Fame, Alzheimer's disease.
- Gennadiy Tsygankov, 58, Soviet Russian ice hockey player and Olympian (1972, 1976).

=== 17 ===
- Ray Barretto, 76, American-born Latin jazz percussionist and bandleader, heart failure.
- Sybille Bedford, 94, German-born British novelist and memoirist.
- Paul Carr, 72, American actor (Akira, Raise the Titanic, Star Trek), lung cancer.
- Bill Cowsill, 58, American singer, lead of The Cowsills, emphysema and other ailments.
- Gertrude Ganote, 86, American baseball player (AAGPBL).
- Harold Hunter, 31, American pro skateboarder, in movie Kids, suspected drug overdose.
- Bob Lewis, 81, American race horse owner, congestive heart failure.
- Jorge Mendonça, 51, Brazilian football player, heart attack.
- Yevgeny Samoylov, 94, Russian actor.

=== 18 ===
- Richard Bright, 68, American actor (The Godfather, Marathon Man, Once Upon a Time in America), traffic collision.
- Paul Carr, 74, American football player (San Francisco 49ers).
- Bill Hartley, 75, Australian political activist and trade unionist.
- Laurel Hester, 49, American gay rights activist, lung cancer.
- Charles Leonard, 92, American US Army Major General and Olympic sharpshooter (1936).
- Saulius Mykolaitis, 40, Lithuanian director, actor, and singer-songwriter.
- Tom Sellers, 83, American newspaper reporter and 1955 Pulitzer Prize winner, heart attack.
- Ruth Taylor, 44, Canadian poet, alcohol poisoning.

=== 19 ===
- Bill Abernathie, 77, American baseball player (Cleveland Indians).
- Angelo Brignole, 81, Italian cyclist.
- Godtfred Holmvang, 88, Norwegian decathlete, skier, and Olympian (1948).
- Ken Keuffel, 82, American college football coach, prostate cancer.
- Erna Lazarus, 102, American screenwriter.
- Edward H. McNamara, 79, American county official.
- Errol Prisby, 63, American football player (Cincinnati Bearcats, Denver Broncos).
- Earl Putman, 74, American football player (Arizona State Sun Devils, Chicago Cardinals).
- Roger Stillwell, 54, American football player (Stanford Cardinal, Chicago Bears).
- Stephen Theobald, 82, British field hockey player and Olympian (1952).
- Franco Vescovi, 76, Italian Olympic boxer (1952).

=== 20 ===
- Ion Drîmbă, 63, Romanian fencer and Olympian (1960, 1964, 1968).
- Lou Gish, 35, British stage, film and television actress, cancer.
- Curt Gowdy, 86, American sports broadcaster, leukemia.
- Paul Marcinkus, 84, American Catholic archbishop, President of Vatican Bank and Pro-President of Vatican City State.
- Lucjan Wolanowski, 86, Polish journalist, writer and traveller.

=== 21 ===
- Gennadiy Aygi, 71, Russian author and poet who wrote in the Chuvash language.
- Scott Breeden, 68, American baseball player and coach.
- Theodore Draper, 93, American historian and political commentator.
- Mark Freeman, 75, American baseball player (Kansas City Athletics, New York Yankees, Chicago Cubs).
- Donnie Gibbs, 60, American football player (TCU Horned Frogs, New Orleans Saints).
- Mirko Marjanović, 68, Serbian politician, Prime Minister of Serbia (1994–2000).
- Angelica Rozeanu, 84, Romanian-born table tennis world champion, cirrhosis.
- Stefan Terlezki, 78, British Conservative Member of Parliament 1983–1987.

=== 22 ===
- Bill Bagnall, 80, American magazine publisher and editor (Motorcyclist).
- Atwar Bahjat, 30, Iraqi journalist for al-Arabiya, abducted and killed in Iraq.
- Anthony Burger, 44, American gospel music pianist, collapsed during performance.
- Hilde Domin, 96, German poet and writer.
- Donelson Hoopes, 73, American curator.
- Odell Horton, 76, American district judge (United States District Court for the Western District of Tennessee).
- Marius Mora, 84, French Olympic cross-country skier (1948).
- Edward Nalbandian, 78, American businessman, owner of Zachary All Clothing in Los Angeles, Alzheimer's disease.
- Dumitru Paraschivescu, 82, Romanian Olympic racewalker (1952, 1956).
- S. Rajaratnam, 90, Singaporean politician, first Senior Minister of Singapore, heart failure.
- John Sullivan, 61, English cricketer.
- Bill Tung, 72, Hong Kong actor, horse racing commentator.
- Richard Wawro, 52, Scottish autistic savant internationally recognized artist, cancer.

=== 23 ===
- Giuseppe Amici, 67, Sammarinese politician, former Captain Regent of San Marino.
- Frederick Busch, 64, American author, heart attack.
- Said Mohamed Djohar, 87, Comorian politician, former President of Comoros.
- Muhammad Shamsul Huq, 93, Bangladeshi academic and minister of foreign affairs.
- Luna Leopold, 90, American ecologist and author.
- Machteld Mellink, 88, Dutch-born American archaeologist of sites in Anatolia.
- Diane Shalet, 71, American actress and author.
- Earl Stallings, 89, American Baptist minister and activist, praised by Martin Luther King Jr. in the "Letter from Birmingham Jail".
- Telmo Zarra, 85, Spanish football player, heart attack.

=== 24 ===
- Octavia E. Butler, 58, American science fiction author and MacArthur Foundation Fellow, head injury.
- Harold Faragher, 88, English cricketer.
- Don Knotts, 81, American actor (The Andy Griffith Show, Three's Company, The Ghost and Mr. Chicken), 5-time Emmy winner, complications from pneumonia and lung cancer.
- John Martin, 58, Canadian broadcaster, throat cancer.
- Andrew Sherratt, 59, British archaeologist at the University of Sheffield, heart failure.
- Denis Twitchett, 80, British Sinologist and scholar, Gordon Wu Professor of Chinese Studies, Princeton University (1980–1994), creator of the 15 volume The Cambridge History of China.
- Sanjeeva Uchil, Indian Olympic footballer (1948).
- Dennis Weaver, 81, American actor (Gunsmoke, McCloud, Duel), Emmy winner (1959), complications from cancer.

=== 25 ===
- Kenneth Deane, 45, Canadian police officer convicted in Ipperwash shooting, automobile accident.
- Thomas Koppel, 61, Danish musician and composer from the band Savage Rose.
- Liang Lingguang, 89, Chinese Communist revolutionary and politician, Minister of Light Industry (1977–1980), Mayor of Guangzhou (1980–1983), Governor of Guangdong (1983–1985).
- Darren McGavin, 83, American actor (Kolchak: The Night Stalker, A Christmas Story, Mickey Spillane's Mike Hammer).
- Henry M. Morris, 87, American young earth creationist leader, complications of stroke.
- Tsegaye Gabre-Medhin, 69, Ethiopian Poet Laureate, kidney disease.
- Imette St. Guillen, 24, American Hispanic John Jay College of Criminal Justice student, murdered.

=== 26 ===
- Ace Adams, 95, American baseball player (New York Giants).
- Georgina Battiscombe, 100, British author and biographer.
- Bill Cardoso, 68, American writer and editor, coined the term "gonzo", heart failure.
- Noel Diprose, 83, Australian cricketer.
- Sir Hans Singer, 95, German-born British economist, helped create the World Food Programme and the United Nations Development Programme.
- Charlie Wayman, 84, English footballer (Southampton, Preston North End).

=== 27 ===
- Alice Baker, 107, British World War I service veteran, last surviving British woman to serve in the First World War, member of the Royal Flying Corps.
- Ferenc Bene, 61, Hungarian football player and Olympian (1964), fall.
- Otis Chandler, 78, American former publisher of the Los Angeles Times, Lewy body disease.
- Tom Hodgson, 81, Canadian artist, canoeist, and Olympian (1952, 1956).
- Fahd Faraj al-Juwair, 36, Saudi Arabian alleged head of al-Qaeda in the Arabian peninsula, killed in foiled bombing attempt.
- Milton Katims, 96, American violist and conductor, long-time conductor and leader of the Seattle Symphony.
- Bob McFarlane, 78, Canadian sprinter and Olympian (1948).
- Tsakani Mhinga, 27, South African R&B singer, drug overdose.
- William Musto, 88, American politician, former mayor of Union City, New Jersey, convicted of racketeering.
- Robert Lee Scott Jr., 97, American general officer, retired United States Air Force brigadier general and fighter ace, author (God is My Co-Pilot).
- Linda Smith, 48, British comedian, ovarian cancer.

=== 28 ===
- Bunkie Blackburn, 69, American NASCAR driver.
- Owen Chamberlain, 85, American particle physicist, co-discoverer of the antiproton, winner of the 1959 Nobel Prize in Physics, complications from Parkinson's Disease.
- Travis Claridge, 27, American football player (Atlanta Falcons, Carolina Panthers, Hamilton Tiger-Cats), pneumonia.
- Lodovico Espinosa, 79, Filipino Olympic sports shooter (1972).
- Hugh McCartney, 86, Scottish politician, former Labour Party MP.
- Ron Cyrus, 70, American politician, lung cancer.
- Vojko Šeravić, 79, Croatian Olympic rower (1952).
- Peter Snow, c. 70, New Zealand doctor who discovered "Tapanui flu" (chronic fatigue syndrome).
- Arno Wallaard, 26, Dutch cyclist.
