= Athletics at the 1952 Summer Olympics – Men's 50 kilometres walk =

Men's 50 kilometres walk at the Games of the XV Olympiad
- Venue: Helsinki Olympic Stadium
- Dates: July 21, 1952
- Competitors: 31 from 16 nations
- Winning time: 4:28:07.8 OR

Medalists
1st place, gold medalist(s)		Giuseppe Dordoni	Italy
2nd place, silver medalist(s)		Josef Doležal	Czechoslovakia
3rd place, bronze medalist(s)		Antal Róka	Hungary

The Men's 50 kilometres walk at the 1952 Summer Olympics took place on July 21 at the Helsinki Olympic Stadium. Italian athlete Giuseppe Dordoni earned the gold medal and set a new Olympic Record.

== Results ==
Rank	Athlete	Nationality	Time	Notes
1st place, gold medalist(s)	Giuseppe Dordoni	Italy	4:28:07.8	OR
2nd place, silver medalist(s)	Josef Doležal	Czechoslovakia	4:30:17.8	
3rd place, bronze medalist(s)	Antal Róka	Hungary	4:31:27.2	
4	Rex Whitlock	Great Britain	4:32:21.0	
5	Sergey Lobastov	Soviet Union	4:32:34.2	
6	Vladimir Ukhov	Soviet Union	4:32:51.6	
7	Dumitru Paraschivescu	Romania	4:41:05.2	
8	Ion Baboie	Romania	4:41:52.8	
9	John Ljunggren	Sweden	4:43:45.2	
10	Giuseppe Kressevich	Italy	4:44:30.2	
11	Harold Whitlock	Great Britain	4:45:12.6	
12	Sándor László	Hungary	4:45:55.8	
13	Rudi Lüttge	Germany	4:47:28.6	
14	Pekka Viljanen	Finland	4:49:16.4	
15	Donald Tunbridge	Great Britain	4:50:40.4	
16	Raymond Lesage	France	4:52:37.8	
17	Edgar Bruun	Norway	4:52:48.4	
18	Claude Hubert	France	4:55:28.2	
19	Salvatore Cascino	Italy	4:56:46.0	
20	Harry Kristensen	Denmark	4:57:35.8	
21	Jean Strunc	France	4:59:08.2	
22	Adolf Weinacker	United States	5:01:00.4	
23	Pavel Kazankov	Soviet Union	5:02:37.8	
24	Gilbert Marquis	Switzerland	5:02:56.2	
25	Ferd Hayward	Canada	5:04:40.4	
26	René Charrière	Switzerland	5:08:59.0	
27	Gerhard Winther	Norway	5:11:40.2	
28	Åke Söderlund	Sweden	5:30:56.6	
	Guillermo Weller	Argentina	DNF	
	John Deni	United States	DNF	
	Leo Sjogren	United States	DNF	
	Baruch Elias	Romania	DNS	
	Verner Ljunggren	Sweden	DNS	
