= 1954 European Athletics Championships – Men's 50 kilometres walk =

Men's 50 kilometres walk at the European Athletics Championships

The men's 50 kilometres race walk at the 1954 European Athletics Championships was held in Bern, Switzerland, on 27 August 1954.

== Medalists ==
Gold	Vladimir Ukhov; Soviet Union
Silver	Josef Doležal; Czechoslovakia
Bronze	Antal Róka; Hungary

== Results ==
=== Final ===
27 August

Rank	Name	Nationality	Time	Notes
1st place, gold medalist(s)	Vladimir Ukhov	Soviet Union	4:22:11.2	CR
2nd place, silver medalist(s)	Josef Doležal	Czechoslovakia	4:25:07.4	
3rd place, bronze medalist(s)	Antal Róka	Hungary	4:31:32.2	
4	John Ljunggren	Sweden	4:38:09.6	
5	János Somogyi	Hungary	4:41:40.4	
6	Frank Bailey	Great Britain	4:46:06.4	
7	Abdon Pamich	Italy	4:49:06.4	
8	Ionescu Baboe	Romania	4:49:30.0	
9	Edgar Bruun	Norway	4:52:13.0	
10	Paavo Saira	Finland	5:06:58.0	
11	René Charrière	Switzerland	5:08:21.0	
12	Marcel Petitville	France	5:12:02.4	
13	Trayko Mastagarkov	Bulgaria	5:23:14.4	
14	Jules Gosse	Belgium	5:23:19.4	
	Albert Johnson	Great Britain	DNF	
	Louis Marquis	Switzerland	DNF	
	Åke Söderlund	Sweden	DNF	
	Pavel Kazankov	Soviet Union	DNF	
	Harald Persson	Norway	DNF	
	Giuseppe Dordoni	Italy	DNF	
	Roger Chaylat	France	DNF	

== Participation ==
According to an unofficial count, 21 athletes from 13 countries participated in the event.

- Belgium (1)
- Bulgaria (1)
- Czechoslovakia (1)
- Finland (1)
- France (2)
- Hungary (2)
- Italy (2)
- Norway (2)
- Romania (1)
- Soviet Union (2)
- Sweden (2)
- Switzerland (2)
- Great Britain (2)
