= 1950 European Athletics Championships – Men's 50 kilometres walk =

Men's 50 kilometres walk at the European Athletics Championships

The men's 50 kilometres race walk at the 1950 European Athletics Championships was held in Brussels, Belgium, on 25 August 1950.

== Medalists ==
Gold	Giuseppe Dordoni; Italy
Silver	John Ljunggren; Sweden
Bronze	Verner Ljunggren; Sweden

== Results ==
=== Final ===
25 August

Rank	Name	Nationality	Time	Notes
1st place, gold medalist(s)	Giuseppe Dordoni	Italy	4:40:43	
2nd place, silver medalist(s)	John Ljunggren	Sweden	4:43:25	
3rd place, bronze medalist(s)	Verner Ljunggren	Sweden	4:49:28	
4	Josef Doležal	Czechoslovakia	4:55:49	
5	John Proctor	Great Britain	4:58:01	
6	Alfred Cotton	Great Britain	5:03:30	
7	Claude Hubert	France	5:07:49	
8	Georges Pouchet	France	5:12:16	
9	Salvatore Cascino	Italy	5:17:15	
10	Anton Kluyskens	Netherlands	5:18:31	
11	Harry Kristensen	Denmark	5:18:55	
12	Oddvar Sponberg	Norway	5:22:41	
13	Jules Thibaut	Belgium	5:23:47	
14	Oddvar Sandvik	Norway	5:24:46	
15	Louis Philippen	Belgium	5:41:15	
	René Charrière	Switzerland	DQ	
	Louis Marquis	Switzerland	DQ	

== Participation ==
According to an unofficial count, 17 athletes from 10 countries participated in the event.

- Belgium (2)
- Czechoslovakia (1)
- Denmark (1)
- France (2)
- Italy (2)
- Netherlands (1)
- Norway (2)
- Sweden (2)
- Switzerland (2)
- Great Britain (2)
