= Theatre and disability =

Representation and portrayal of disability in theatre

Theatre and disability is a subject focusing on the inclusion of disability within a theatrical experience, enabling cultural and aesthetic diversity in the arts. Showing disabled bodies on stage can be to some extent understood as a political aesthetic as it challenges the predominately abled audience's expectations as well as traditional theatre conventions. However, the performance of disabilities on stage has raised polarising debates about whether the performers are exposed and reduced to their disability or whether they have full agency of who they are and what they represent.

== History ==
Disability theatre formally arose out of the disability arts and culture movement in the 1980s in the United States and the United Kingdom. There were, however, some disability-focused theatre companies predating this movement, including the National Theatre of the Deaf, founded in 1967. Notable early disability theatre companies include Graeae Theatre Company (1980 – UK), Theatre Terrific (1985 - Canada), Back to Back Theatre (1988 - Australia) and Phamaly Theatre Company (founded in 1989).

There were some disabled actors such as Esmond Knight (4 May 1906 – 23 February 1987) and Lionel Barrymore (April 28, 1878 – November 15, 1954) already working at the top of their profession, often playing both disabled and non-disabled characters, but they were able to access opportunities because of privileged circumstances as well as talent. Most opportunity, of which there was very little, came through stage comedy or traditions such as pantomime.

== Political change ==
Change does not happen easily and the campaign for political change within society, Nothing About Us Without Us, is as relevant in theatre as it has been in TV, Film, Politics and Design. Campaigns from Disability Rights UK, Disability Arts Alliance, UK Disability Artists Alliance, Disability Artists Community Network (DANC) and others have campaigned for the creative arts to simply be more open to new ideas when it comes to disability. From a creative standpoint they focus on two basic premises that disabled actors and creatives should be the first choice for telling stories about disability, and that disability should not be an unconscious bias barrier to accessing any role in any play.

Disabled mimicry, erasure and absence has no place in the arts. To bring about its end is an industry wide task - inciting best practice guidelines and multi-disciplinary non-hierarchical collaboration…. These casting decisions, and their detrimental effect, have long since been condemned. Disabled artists have been campaigning for 50 years, incrementally growing from the generations before. The work done by our predecessors has allowed this conversation to become mainstream. But as our collective voice grows, it becomes harder to ignore. Excerpt from the open letter written by Disabled Artists Alliance in 2024, and published in The Guardian. This was signed by over 300 disabled artists, theatre professionals and 21 theatre companies.

This campaigning has become more publicly visible especially in the UK with mainstream news vendors such as The Guardian, The Economist, the BBC, PBS News, HuffPost and The Stage have published articles on the historic exclusion of visible disability both from stage and screens, as well as the need for change from within the industry.

== Disability as a creative opportunity ==
The role of an actor is to present interesting choices to the director and to be able to tell someone else's story through themselves. Shifting attitudes in the industry from seeing disability as a diversity target to embracing it as a creative opportunity is an ongoing process, however a deeper understanding of unconscious biases towards disability is evident with more directors casting disabled talent beyond authentically telling stories about disability.

=== Casting without disability bias ===
"How does a character in the script enter the stage?"

This is a question used by disability dramaturgs to analyse unconsciously biases and attitudes in the casting process. The issue that the question raises is why, if it is not stated, is it presumed that the character walked? This methodology draws inspiration from what is often termed as colour-blind casting, where the presumption is removed from every character in a script that they are white.

Roughly 7% of the population has a visible disability, so if there were no biases 7% characters we see on stage would have a visible disability regardless of whether the script says they do or not. Because of under-representation, theatre companies such as the Royal Shakespeare Company and Shakespeare's Globe Theatre have put in place casting and diversity policies to begin to redress that imbalance.

Casting disabled actors as a process has two creative lenses to consider:

1. Disability and incidental portrayal. Despite the characters in most plays being able to be played by disabled actors, with a very few exceptions, disabled actors are rarely given the opportunity to portray them. A question that theatre directors have used at the start of the process when looking at each character in isolation is, "why can't a disabled actor be cast in this role?", followed up with, "what would disability bring to this role?" This gives the director an opportunity to think about how disability could add a dimensions to a role not otherwise considered and whether or not it is truly authentic to the story that will be told. If a disability is written into the character, it should be cast authentically given there are people who audition, if not, it should be a chance for the director to educate themself and the actor cast in that specific role about what disability they will be portraying and how to do so without causing harm.
2. Disability and authentic portrayal. There is an equality opportunity perspective in the acting profession that any actor should be allowed to play any role, however like all ideals there are issues and caveats especially when dealing with protected characteristics. It also presumes that no actors face biases, and as disabled actors are given few opportunities for access mainstream roles, the case for authentic casting for disability is strengthened.

=== Disability dramaturgy ===
This is a role that is very similar to a regular dramaturge. It can be utilised by any stage, TV or film production that is creating, casting or telling a story about disability, or are exploring the possibility of casting disabled actors into mainstream roles. The engagement of a disability dramaturge happens at the start of the casting process to help directors identify characters that could be played by visibly disabled actors, and discuss ideas that come from potential choices and the lenses that bring to the meaning of the play, TV drama or movie. The engagement progresses beyond casting in a traditional way, working with the director and the actors by focusing on aspects of storytelling and meaning. The aim is to ensure that both authenticity and creative opportunity stay forefront with regards to visible disability.

==== What is a disability dramaturg? ====
This is a creative role and is usually carried out by a person with experience as either a professional stage or screen actor, or theatre director, and who has lived experience as a visibly disabled or Deaf person. This role is not to be confused with a Disability, Accessibility or Access Consultant as these are more functional roles that focus on practical accessibility considerations, communication strategies and organisational culture, rather than the creative process.

In short, having a disability dramaturg who is a disabled person provides a safe-creative space in the rehearsal room that can work to educate a production, cast, team, playwright on the certain topic of disability that the specific production deals with. A disabled disability dramaturg can provide a stronger experience that can strengthen respectful representation of disability on stage.

Research

A disability Dramaturg provides research especially if the script features a disabled literary or historical figure. They focus on the history, sociology, art, and linguistics of the work, which includes providing practical advice on the difference between literal condition portrayal, or the portrayal of the lived experience of disability. This can also include ideas such as transposing a character's visible condition to that of the actor has because the attitudes and experience are the important factor rather than the exact condition, or working with the production to explore the impact of introducing a visible condition to a character not just on them but on how the other characters would behave.

===== Provide context =====
Disability Dramaturgs share their insight of their and other lived experiences with the production team including the Director, Producers and Actors, to ensure there is a shared understanding about disability portrayal.

===== Support writers =====
Disability can be a story, but it can also be subtext, and in either case it's not just the character, but the attitudes of those around them that lend themselves to the authenticity of portrayal. Having a creative advisor with a lived experience will enable writers to explore possibilities, try out ideas and discuss the topic in a safe and creative space. They provide feedback to the writers during the process, so if changes are made during production, they can be made with confidence.

===== Support the casting process =====
When casting disabled actors there are several things a disability dramaturg can help with, especially when it comes to progressive conditions within the story where the Director may need input to support an approach of where an actor is being asked to mask and then reveal their condition to an audience. Other than that they are very useful when it comes to evaluating roles for incidental portrayal casting. What is commonly overlooked is that most roles can be played by actors with different visible disabilities. So even if characters are not identified as disabled or non-disabled in the script, the disability dramaturg will support the production team to explore the possibilities for each character, and help evaluate whether disability could bring something interesting to the role.

===== Support the director =====
Disability Dramaturgs provide support to the director as they develop their concept for the production, and where the Director has ideas about weaving in stories or portrayal, whether it is authentic or incidental, the disability dramaturg is there to help them evaluate and develop those ideas.

===== Enhance the audience experience =====
Disability Dramaturgs can also help the marketing and publicity teams identify stories about the story that would be good to create greater public interest.

== Examples of scripted disabled characters in plays ==
There are many examples of disabled characters in plays, some fictional and others focusing lives of disabled people from history such as Lord Byron, Franklin D. Roosevelt, Frida Kahlo or Henri de Toulouse-Lautrec. Historically these have been played by non-disabled actors, which is commonly referred to as 'cripping-up', but because of changes in casting practices and more disabled actors coming through, this is becoming less common. Because historically disability was more common in Victorian or earlier times, especially amongst the general population because of diseases, work injuries, war and diet, plays that focus on everyday people that look to historical accuracy would need physical disabilities in more than 10% of the cast, which could be things like limb differences or mobility issues. For example the works of Charlies Dickens, especially Oliver Twist, Les Miserables by Victor Hugo or adaptations of the works of Catherine Cookson should need to have much higher instances of visible disabilities if authenticity is a consideration.

Diana in Next to Normal

The musical Next to Normal navigates the story of Diana Goodman, her bipolar disorder, and the effects it has on her whole family. It uses a pop-contemporary score.

=== Laura in The Glass Menagerie ===
Tennessee Williams explains that the character Laura (The Glass Menagerie) has grown up with a disability: "A childhood illness has left her crippled, one leg slightly shorter than the other, and held in a brace."

=== Nessarose in Wicked ===
The musical Wicked by Stephen Schwartz and Winnie Holzman has been running on Broadway since 2003, and has launched multiple national tours and productions worldwide. In the musical, the character of Elphaba has a sister who is a wheelchair user named Nessarose. She was disabled at birth due to a congenital birth defect, and goes through the production inhabiting the role of villain. The production has come under fire for not casting a physically disabled actor in the role.

=== Duke of Gloucester/The King in Richard III ===
In Shakespeare's play Richard III, ableism is a central theme as to some degree attitudes and prejudice drive Richard to become who he becomes. Playing Richard as non-disabled has been called out as "Disability Erasure", where non-disabled directors try to remove mentions of disability from the script in order to cast a non-disabled actor.

Duke of Gloucester/The King in Richard III (A One Person Show) adapted by Kolbrun Bjort Sigfusdottir & Emily Carding (adaptation of William Shakespeare's Richard III), Richard III (1699 play) by Colley Cibber or Teenage Dick by Mike Lew.

Duke of Gloucester in Henry VI part 2 and Henry VI part 3, by William Shakespeare, and as such he appears in The Wars of the Roses, an adaptation of William Shakespeare's Richard III and Henry VI plays.

=== Joseph Merrick in The Real and Imagined History of The Elephant Man. An historical figure previously misnamed as 'John' Merrick in The Elephant Man. ===
Plays about important disabled historical figures can be fraught with difficulties when a non-disabled actor is cast. Understanding what it is to be a disabled person is far more than portraying a condition and how Joseph Merrick's story has evolved from John Merrick in The Elephant Man, a play that drifts from his story missing not only much of who he was (even his name is wrong) and what it is to be a disabled person, to a play that dives deeply into the lived experience. This second play has had two professional productions to date in Australia and the United Kingdom. The Real and Imagined History of the Elephant Man by Tom Wright premiered on 4 August 2017, starring Daniel Monks in the title role. The cast also featured Paula Arundell, Julie Forsyth, Emma J. Hawkins, and Sophie Ross. The play toured the UK in 2023, directed by Stephen Bailey and starring Zak Ford-Williams as Joseph. This cast of this production included Annabelle Davies, Daneka Etchells and Nadia Nadarajah.

=== Hamm, Clov, Nagg and Nell in Samual Beckett's Endgame ===
Each character has a disability as an underlying characteristic. In the book, Samuel Beckett and Disability Performance, author Hannah Simpson reveals how Beckett's theatre, "compulsively interrogates alternative embodiments, unexpected forms of agency, and the extraordinary social interdependency of the human body."

=== Further examples of disabled fictional and non-fictional characters ===
Play	Disabled Character(s)	Writer(S)
55 Days	Charles I of England	Howard Brenton
A Christmas Carol	Tiny Tim	Charles Dickens, with stage adaptations by David Edgar, Jack Thorne and most notably Mark Gatiss's, A Christmas Carol: A Ghost Story.
A Bequest to the Nation	Horatio Nelson, 1st Viscount Nelson	Terence Rattigan
All of Us	Jess	Francesca Martinez
Bubble Boy	Jimmy	Cinco Paul and Ken Daurio
Byron	Lord George Gordon Byron	Alicia Ramsey
Camino Real	Lord George Gordon Byron	Tennessee Williams
Carrie's War	Mr Johnny Gotobed	Nina Bawden
Coram Boy	Meshak Gardiner	Helen Edmundson
Cost of Living	John	Martyna Majok
Cyrano de Bergerac	Cyrano de Bergerac	Edmond Rostand
Dangerous to Know	Lord George Gordon Byron	Deborah Clair
Dr. Strangelove	Dr. Strangelove	Stanley Kubrick, Terry Southern and Peter GeorgeAdapted for the stage by Armando Iannucci and Sean Foley
Equivocation	Robert Cecil, 1st Earl of Salisbury	Bill Cain
Flowers for Algeron	Charlie	Daniel Keyes
Frankenstein	The Monster, Igor and De Lacey	Mary Shelly Stage adaptations by Nick Dear, Barbara Field, Jonathan Christenson, Richard Brinsley Peake and Eric B. Sirota
Glee	Artie	Ryan Murphy, Brad Falchuk and Ian Brennan
Happy Days	Winnie and Willie	Samual Beckett
I, Claudius	Claudius	John Mortimer and Michael White Based on the Robert Graves books I, Claudius and Claudius the God
I Won't Dance	Dom	Oliver Hailey
In the Burning Darkness	Ignacio, Carlos and the other boys	Antonio Buero Vallejo
Johnny Belinda	Belinda MacDonald	Elmer Blaney Harris
Kafka	Franz Kafka	Jack Klaff
Kafka's Dick	Franz Kafka	Alan Bennett
Kafka the Musical	Franz Kafka	Murray Gold
Lady Chatterley's Lover	Clifford	D.H. Lawrence Adapted for stage by John Harte
Lautrec	Henri de Toulouse-Lautrec	Robert Kornhiser
Lautrec The Musical	Henri de Toulouse-Lautrec	Charles Aznavour
Lord of the Flies	Simon	William Golding
Moby Dick	Captain Ahab	Herman Melville, with adaptations for stage by Mark Rosenwinkel, Jim Burke, Julian Rad, Morris Panych and David Catlin
Molly Sweeney	Molly	Brian Friel
Moulin Rouge	Henri de Toulouse-Lautrec	Baz Luhrmann and Craig Pearce
Nelson – The Sailor's Story	Lord Horatio Nelson	Nicholas Collett
Nicholas Nickleby	Smike	Charles Dickens, with theatrical adaptations by Edward Stirling and David Edgar, as well as a musical adaptation "Smike" by Simon May, Clive Barnett and Roger Holman
Of Mice and Men	Lennie Small, Candy and Crooks	John Steinbeck
Oedipus	Tiresias	An adaption of Sophocles' Oedipus Rex, written by John Dryden and Nathaniel Lee
Pollyanna	Pollyanna	Eleanor H. Porter Adapted for stage by Catherine Chisholm Cushing
Rear Window	Hal Jeffries	Cornell Woolrich Stage adaptation by Keith Reddin
Stuck in Neutral	Shawn	Based on the novel Stuck in Neutral by Terry Trueman Stage adaptation by Allison Cameron Gray and Matt Corpenning
Sunrise at Campobello	Franklin D. Roosevelt	Dore Schary
Sweet Nothing in My Ear	Laura, Max, Sally and Dr Walters	Stephen Sachs
The Boys Next Door	Arnold, Lucien Sheila, Barry and Norman	Tom Griffin
The Chairs	Old Man and Old Woman	Eugène Ionesco
Children of a Lesser God	Sarah Norman	Mark Medoff
The Cripple of Inishmaan	Billy Claven	Martin McDonagh
The Curious Incident of the Dog in the Night-Time	Christopher	Mark Haddon Stage adaptation by Simon Stephens
The Hunchback of Notre Dame	Quasimodo	Victor Hugo Stage adaptations by Ken Hill, Robert Hossein, Nicholas DeBaubien, Pip Utton, James Villafuerte, Harold Hodge Jr and Benjamin Polya
The Life and Death of Lord Byron	Lord George Gordon Byron	Stage adaptation by Arthur Kahn
The Metamorphosis	Gregor Samsa	Franz Kafka Adaptations for stage by Lemm Sissay, E. Thomalen, Steven Berkoff and Steve Moulds
The Miracle Worker	Helen	William Gibson
The Return of The Soldier	Christopher	Rebecca West Stage adaptation by John Van Druten
The Rules of Charity	Monty	John Belluso
The Secret Garden	Colin	Frances Hodgson Burnett Adaptations by Pamela Sterling, Thomas W. Olson, Lucy Simon, Jessica Swale, Rosalind Sydney, and Anna Himali Howard & Holly Robinson
The Trial of Davros	Davros	Kevin Taylor and Michael Wisher
The Who's Tommy	Tommy	Pete Townshend
Trafalgar - Nelson's Finest Hour	Lord Horatio Nelson	Daniel Dalton and Tim Spencer
Treasure Island	Long John Silver and Blind Pew	Robert Louis Stevenson Stage adaptations by Jules Eckert Goodman, Jule Styne, Sebastian, Ken Ludwig, B.H. Barry & Vernon Morris, Mike Kenny, Bryony Lavery, Nicolas Billon and Sandi Toksvig
Tribes	Billy	Nina Raine
Wait Until Dark	Susy	Frederick Knott
Waiting for Godot	Pozzo and Lucky	Samual Beckett
Whatever Happened to Baby Jane	Blanche	Henry Farrell

== Disabled talent and theatre companies ==
The UK's Royal National Theatre launched a service in 2021 aimed at Casting Directors called ProFile which enables access professional disabled actor details and a showreel in the form of a short performance.

=== Notable living stage actors and production reviews ===
The following examples of actors playing both disabled characters and bringing their whole selves to what could be regarded as mainstream characters, in major professional mainstream productions. This list of actors and reviews demonstrates that disabled actors in both disabled and non-disabled roles is not an act of worthiness but a creative opportunity.

- Nadia Albina, A Streetcar Named Desire, English, Othello, Merchant of Venice
- Liz Carr, Unspeakable Conversations, The Normal Heart, Assisted Suicide
- Peter Dinklage, Cyrano, Richard III
- Daneka Etchells, The Welkin, Much Ado About Nothing, Brassed Off
- Madison Ferris, All of Me, The Glass Menagerie
- Zak Ford-Williams, The Real & Imagined History of The Elephant Man, A Christmas Carol: A Ghost Story Richard III
- Mat Frazer, Richard III, Unspeakable Conversations, Beauty and the Beast
- Sarah Gordy, Crocodiles, Jellyfish
- Alison Halstead, The Cherry Orchard, Future Bodies, Hole, The House Of Bernarda Alba
- Kate Hood, The Cost of Living
- Arthur Hughes, Richard III, The Dutchess of Malfi, La Cage Aux Folles, One Flew Over The Cuckoo's Nest
- Melissa Johns, One Flew Over The Cuckoo's Nest, Henry V
- Francesca Martinez, All of Us
- Francesca Mills, The Dutchess of Malfi, The American Clock, Mallory Towers
- Daniel Monks, Richard III, The Seagul, The Real and Imagined History of the Elephant Man
- Tom Mothersdale, Richard III, London Tide, Love and Other Acts of Violence
- Kate Mulvany, Richard III, Every Brilliant Thing, Julius Caesar
- Nadia Nadarajah, Antony and Cleopatra, Grounded, Loves Labour Lost, A Midsummer Night's Dream
- Jan Potměšil, Richard III, Flowers for Algernon, Hamlet, Trouble in the House of God
- Sophie Leigh Stone, Frozen, Mother Courage and Her Children, Woman of Flowers
- Katy Sullivan, The Cost of Living, Richard III
- Michael Patrick Thornton, Richard III, Macbeth, A Doll's House
- Amy Trigg, The Little Big Things, Reasons You Should(n't) Love Me, The Taming of the Shrew, The Glass Menagerie

==== Advice for disabled actors ====
In recent years the intake of disabled students has increased, although for some after years of actively blocking disabled student applications they are now actively looking for disabled students as attitudes in the theatre, TV and film industries are beginning to change. To support emerging talent publications such as The Actors' & Performers' Yearbook now provide guidance specifically targeted at young disabled actors.

"The presence of marginalised groups can bring about social and political change: the normalised presence of marginalised groups cements it. The rest is celebration." Zak ford-Williams 2024.

=== Contemporary disability-led theatre companies ===
Since the 1980s there has been a movement focusing primarily on telling disability stories. From this, several well-funded and popular professional theatre companies have formed and this has become an important branch of theatremaking. This is particularly significant because these companies have become a training ground for disabled actors, directors, producers, and writers who have been excluded from mainstream training channels.

- ARBOS – Company for Music and Theatre, founded in 1994
- Back to Back Theatre (Geelong, Australia), founded in 1987
- Blue Apple Theatre, founded in 2005
- Canadian Deaf Theatre, founded in 1989
- Chickenshed Theatre Company, founded in 1974
- CO_LAB Theater Company, founded in 2011
- Deaf West Theatre (Los Angeles, USA), founded in 1991
- Definitely Theatre, founded in 2002
- Detour Theatre Company, founded in 2000
- Dream Street Theater, New York
- EPIC Players, New York and L.A., founded in 2016
- Extant (London, UK), founded in 1997
- Graeae Theatre Company, founded in 1980
- Hijinx Theatre, founded in 1981
- Joe Jack & John (Montreal, Canada), founded in 2003
- Queen's Theater,
- Mind The Gap, founded in 1998
- National Theatre of the Deaf, founded in 1968
- Open Circle Theatre, founded in 2003
- Phamaly Theatre Company, founded in 1989
- Ramps On The Moon, founded in 2015
- Realwheels Theatre (Vancouver, Canada), founded in 2003
- Sick + Twisted Theatre Inc. (Winnipeg, Canada), founded in 2016
- The Southside Group (Glasgow, Scotland), founded in 2020
- Theater Breaking Through Barriers, founded in 1979
- Theatre Terrific (Vancouver, Canada), founded in 1984
- VitalXposure, founded in 2011
