= 1946 European Athletics Championships – Men's 50 kilometres walk =

Men's 50 kilometres walk at the European Athletics Championships

The men's 50 kilometres race walk at the 1946 European Athletics Championships was held in Oslo, Norway, on 23 August 1946.

== Medalists ==
Gold	John Ljunggren; Sweden
Silver	Harry Forbes; Great Britain
Bronze	Charles Megnin; Great Britain

== Results ==
=== Final ===
23 August

Rank	Name	Nationality	Time	Notes
1st place, gold medalist(s)	John Ljunggren	Sweden	4:38:20	CR
2nd place, silver medalist(s)	Harry Forbes	Great Britain	4:42:58	
3rd place, bronze medalist(s)	Charles Megnin	Great Britain	4:57:04	
4	Oddvar Sponberg	Norway	5:00:27	
5	Harry Kristensen	Denmark	5:03:18	
	Harry Olsson	Sweden	DNF	
	Edgar Bruun	Norway	DQ	
	Josef Doležal	Czechoslovakia	DQ	

== Participation ==
According to an unofficial count, 8 athletes from 5 countries participated in the event.

- Czechoslovakia (1)
- Denmark (1)
- Norway (2)
- Sweden (2)
- Great Britain (2)
