= The Rules of Charity =

2005 play by John Belluso

The Rules of Charity is a 2005 play by the American playwright John Belluso. The play premiered on April 23, 2005, at the Magic Theatre in San Francisco, California. It has since had an Off-Broadway run. The play focuses on a man named Monty with cerebral palsy who uses a wheelchair, and whose adult daughter takes care of him.

John Belluso - whose contemporaries included the playwright Tony Kushner - used a wheelchair himself. His wheelchair use was a result of a bone disease called Camurati–Engelmann disease. The Rules of Charity, like most of Belluso's work, explores what it means to be disabled or marginalized in modern American society. He was an advocate for writers, playwrights, and artists with disabilities and used his own personal experience to deepen and drive his own work. As a young playwright, Belluso worked with the New Dramatists, connecting with his fellow playwrights of the time and making an impression during his unfortunately short career that impacted many.

The Dramatists Play Service version of the published script contains, next to the character descriptions and play setting, a poem by Wallace Stevens entitled A Postcard from the Volcano. The poem speaks to the leaving behind of the experience of an older generation, a generation that suffered and that the younger generation will know nothing about.

This speaks to the themes of the play as a whole, as it focuses heavily on familial relationships, and the younger generation being so preoccupied with their own problems that they cannot see the long-suffering of the older generation.

== Plot summary ==
The Rules of Charity focuses on a middle-aged man named Monty, and his daughter Loretta. Monty has cerebral palsy and uses a wheelchair, and Loretta, a grown woman, cares for him. The play focuses around their relationship, the anger and resentment that lives within their connection, as well as the love between them. The play also focuses on how one navigates our world when one is an outsider, whether that is because of one's ability or disability, sexuality, religion, or social class.

Structurally, The Rules of Charity is in a standard two-act dramatic structure with Act I taking place in the present day, and Act II taking place one year later. The play is also split up by named sections that divide up the action further, framed by a prologue and an epilogue.

=== Prologue: The Introduction of Cruelty ===
The play opens with Loretta at the end of her rope, in the apartment that she and her father share, having just slapped her father, knocking over his wheelchair. "Cruelty is a form of goodness", she tells him. Menacingly, but laced with the love that she has for her father, she tells him that she will only treat him with cruelty from that moment on.

=== Act One, Section 1: Apothetai (The Place of Exposure) ===
The next morning, Loretta and Monty are at home, things are normal again. LH, the superintendent of the building comes in with a bottle of scotch, celebrating his recent raise. Monty invites him to stay for dinner, and LH encourages Monty to try and leave his apartment in order to look for a job. Monty refuses, and it is revealed that Monty and LH are secret lovers. LH tells Monty that he has invited over the daughter of the building owner Paz, who is a documentary filmmaker. She wants to talk to Monty. Monty is unsure, but LH assures him that everything will be fine.

Later that evening, Loretta meets a dull man named Horace by a street corner. They flirt and he asks her out on a date, which she refuses.

The next morning, Paz arrives with LH at Monty and Loretta's apartment. Paz pitches her documentary to Monty - she wants to write about what she perceives as the enormous and dramatic struggle of disabled people. Monty is clearly far superior to her in intelligence, and does not take to her well. However, she offers him a large sum of money to be a part of her documentary, and so Monty promises LH that he will consider it. Monty and Loretta are left alone and share a brief moment of tenderness, it is also revealed that Loretta's mother, Monty's wife, is no longer living and that that day would have been her birthday.

Loretta returns to the street corner to invite Horace over to her apartment for dinner. Initially he is nervous about going to dinner, and says that he usually works until late at the fish factory. She promises him that she will give her father pills to fall asleep so that he can come over without Monty bothering them. He accepts, and she kisses him.

LH and Monty are alone, drinking in Loretta and Monty's apartment. They recount the tales of Greek Mythology that LH read about in books that Monty lent him. Monty describes to LH what the Apothetai was in ancient Greece - the place where disabled babies were left to die. LH is very moved, and asks Monty if he knew he was gay, even when he was married. Monty says that yes, he did. Loretta then enters and puts Monty to bed, giving him his pill that helps him sleep. Monty whispers to himself that he wants to go away with LH and let her live on her own, and in doing so, he throws himself from his bed and lands on the floor. Angry and exasperated, Loretta tells him that he can sleep on the floor.

=== Act One, Section 2: The Poor Laws ===
The following morning. Monty is sitting on the couch of his apartment while Paz prepares to begin shooting the documentary. LH and Loretta, one after the other, enter the apartment. They watch as Paz begins to interview Monty for the camera. Her questions offend Monty, as they obsess over what Paz determines to be the 'grotesque' aspect of Monty's disabled existence. She suggests that he ask her some questions in order to make them more comfortable around one another. When he is asking questions about her personal life, Paz reveals that she and LH are together. Monty did not know this and is blindsided. Unaware of Monty and LH's relationship, Paz continues to question Monty, pressing him on his sexuality and financial situation. Turning the questions once more back on her, Monty suggests to Paz that she make her film more about the overall concept of charity. He suggests that she structure her film around the origins of how disability caused societal isolation. She is disappointed, and when she once again asks to hear about his life story, he is enraged and asks her to leave his house. She does.

Once Paz leaves, Monty tells LH that he wants them to be together. LH responds saying that he doesn't want to be with Monty, both because he doesn't want to be gay and because he doesn't want to have to take care of him. LH breaks it off between them, leaving Monty in the apartment alone.

LH and Paz stand outside of the apartment building under a lamppost. LH has moved out of the building and is no longer the janitor there. He proposes marriage to Paz. She accepts.

Back in the apartment, Loretta has fed Monty four of his pills to make him sleep while she and Horace have dinner. They talk about their families and Loretta admits, while Horace sleeps, that she both loves and hates her father. Monty groggily hears her say all of this. Loretta and Horace exit to her bedroom to make love. Monty takes the pill bottle from his bedside table and slowly eats every pill.

=== Act Two, Section 3: The Baby, Or A Testimony of Dark Things ===
One year after the events of Act I, Loretta and Horace, and Monty are back in the apartment. Loretta has developed a habit of pretending to be pregnant by sticking a balloon under her shirt, but she tells Horace that they can't afford a real baby.

Later, on a street corner, Loretta, wearing the balloon as a fake pregnant belly, runs into Paz. Paz introduces herself by her real name, Joyce. She tells Loretta that she and LH (now known as Mr. Millicent) are married and are born-again Christians. Seemingly relieved to see Loretta, she asks if a publisher has published her father's journal. Loretta is surprised by this and answers that the journal is not published, that it is not even finished. Joyce offers Loretta money in exchange for her father's journal, for his story.

Back at the apartment, Loretta tries to convince Monty to give her his journal for money. He refuses, especially refusing to give his journal to LH. LH is seen desperately trying to read, but since he can't without Monty, he despairs. At the apartment once again, Horace comes home very drunk after having gotten in a bar fight. Loretta approaches him and tells him that they are going to pretend to be a happily married, pregnant couple in order to sell her father's journal to Joyce. She tells him that after they do so, he is going to leave the apartment and never come back, calling him a cripple who has made her life even worse.

=== Act Two, Section 4: Knot Stew ===
Loretta and Horace set up dinner at the apartment, nervous that everything will go well for the dinner with LH (now Mr. Millicent) where they will try to sell Monty's journal. Mr. Millicent arrives at dinner, appearing much changed from the last time Loretta, Horace, and Monty saw him. Monty arrives as well, and begins grilling Mr. Millicent on his latest reading material. Mr. Millicent has trouble keeping up with Monty, which makes Monty smug. Angry, Mr. Millicent reveals that he has come to dinner to ask for the pages in Monty's journal in which he wrote about their romantic relationship, claiming that those stories are lies. Loretta begs for charity, for money in exchange for the journal. Mr. Millicent declares that they are unworthy of charity and refuses Monty's journal, violently flipping over Monty's wheelchair in the process. In response, Horace slits Mr. Millicent's throat, killing him. He apologizes profusely as Mr. Millicent dies, with Monty and Loretta looking on.

=== Epilogue: The Swallows ===
Loretta and Monty sit on the floor, Loretta cradling Monty, who is hurt from his fall from his wheelchair. Horace has put Mr. Millicent's body in his car, and tells Loretta that he will drive away with it forever. He tells her to blame the murder all on him, and she agrees. Horace leaves, and Monty hands Loretta the last pages of his journal to read. She reads out loud the last passage from his journal, where he describes telling her, as a baby, that she will have to learn to swallow her pain. Monty dies in Loretta's arms. She smiles.

== Characters ==
Loretta - Monty's daughter, mid-20s

Monty - Loretta's father, late 40s. Monty is very intelligent and handsome, he also has cerebral palsy, but is only slightly impaired in his speech. Monty keeps a journal, which Paz wants to use in her documentary. He also uses a wheelchair.

Horace Arby - An unemployed former security bouncer who falls in love with Loretta. He eventually comes to live with her, until she kicks him out.

LH (later Mr. Millicent) - The superintendent of Loretta and Monty's apartment building, mid-40s. LH is attracted to Monty, but is in a relationship with Paz/Joyce. Once he starts dating her, he finds religion and becomes a fanatic.

Paz (later Joyce) - The daughter of the owner of the building in which Loretta and Monty live. Early 30s. She is a documentary filmmaker who wants to make a film about Monty's struggle as a disabled person.

Theatre and disability has grown as a movement and portrayal of characters like these characters is subject to greater scrutiny, as disabled actors are more commonly authentically cast, reclaiming disabled stories, bringing authenticity, subtext and postmodern perspective of disability in performance.

== Playwright ==
John Belluso (1969–2006) was a well-established young American playwright whose works focused on the life of people with disabilities in modern America, and how they navigated a world that was generally set against them. Belluso had Camurati-Englemann Disease and used a wheelchair. He believed that disability created a perfect mindset for a person to have a yearning to make theatre - as someone who is often looked at and scrutinized by society, he felt that it was a natural feeling for a person to want to turn that mirror back on society, and he chose to do so by creating theatre. The Rules of Charity, like most of Belluso's work, explores what it means to be disabled or marginalized in modern American society. Belluso was an advocate for writers, playwrights, and artists with disabilities, and used his own personal experience to deepen and drive his own work.

As a young playwright, John Belluso worked with the New Dramatists, connecting with his fellow contemporary playwrights (for example, the playwright Tony Kushner) and making an impression during his unfortunately short career that impacted many.

== Production history ==
=== Premiere production ===
The premiere production of The Rules of Charity opened on April 23, 2005, at the Magic Theatre in San Francisco. The production was directed by Chris Smith and featured Arwen Anderson, Gabriel Marin, David Warren Keith, Andrew Hurteau, and Sally Clawson.

=== Off-Broadway production ===
The Off-Broadway production of The Rules of Charity ran from May 26, 2007, to July 24, 2007. It was presented by Theatre by the Blind at the Lion Theatre in New York City. The production was directed by Ike Schambelan and featured Gregg Mozgala, Christopher Hurt, Pamela Sabaugh, Brian Bielawski, Nicholas Viselli, Hollis Hamilton, and George Ashiotis.

=== Casts ===
Character	Premiere	Off-Broadway
Loretta	Arwen Anderson	Pamela Sabaugh
Horace	Gabriel Marin	Brian Bielawski
Monty	David Warren Keith	Christopher Hurt
LH	Andrew Hurteau	Nicholas Viselli
Paz	Sally Clawson	Hollis Hamilton

Note: For accessibility reasons, the Off-Broadway production also included an unseen narrator played by Gregg Mozgala.

== See also ==
- Theatre and disability
- Disability in the arts
