= Honko =

Honko is a Finnish-language surname. Notable people with the surname include:

- Jaakko Honko (1922–2006), Finnish business economist
- Lauri Honko (1932–2002), professor of folklore studies and comparative religion
