= Postage stamps and postal history of Kastellorizo =

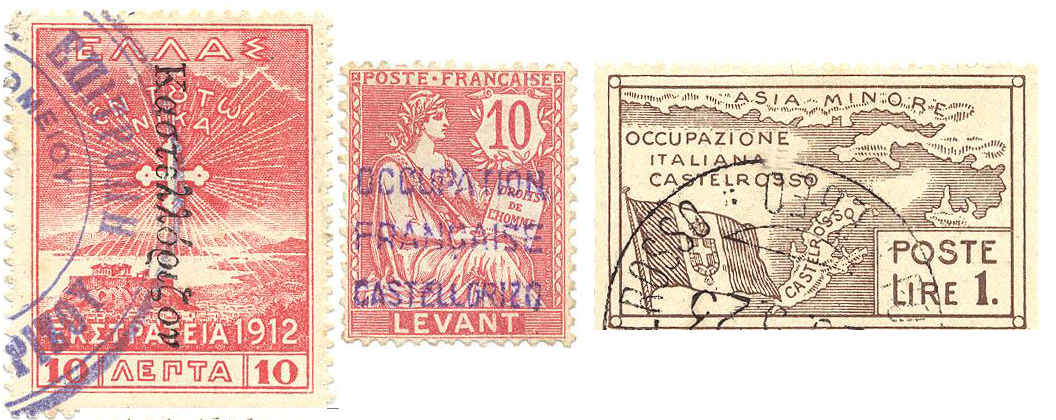
Greek (1912), French, and Italian stamps from the island

Kastellorizo is the easternmost Greek island and is situated in the Eastern Mediterranean. It lies about 2 miles (3 km) from the Anatolian coast (Lycia), more or less halfway between Rhodes and Antalya.

== Early history ==
The island was colonised by Dorian Greeks, during the Hellenistic period the island was ruled by Rhodes, being part of its Peraia. In the Byzantine Empire it was part of the province of the Islands, whose capital was Rhodes. In 1306 the island was taken over by the Knights of St. John Hospitaller of Jerusalem, headed by Foulques de Villaret. In 1512 it was conquered by Ottoman Sultan Suleiman I.

== French occupation ==
On 14 March 1913 the local population imprisoned the Turkish governor and his Ottoman garrison and proclaimed a provisional government. In August 1913, the Greek government sent from Samos a provisional governor supported by gendarmes. On 28 December 1915, the French navy occupied the island.

In 1920, the French occupation forces issued stamps of the French post offices in the Turkish Empire overprinted O.N.F. / Castellorizo, then with B.N.F. / CASTELLORIZO and then O F / CASTELLORISO oriented vertically. All of these overprints are uncommon, with prices ranging from US$10 up to over US$500 for some types.

== Italian rule ==
In the Treaty of Sèvres the island was assigned to Italy and the Italian navy assumed it from the French on 1 March 1921. The Treaty of Lausanne confirmed the Italian claim on Kastellorizo, and the island – under the Italian name "Castelrosso" – was then integrated in the possession of the Isole Italiane dell'Egeo.

Starting in 1922, the Italians overprinted their own stamps with CASTELROSSO horizontally. In 1923 they issued a series of five stamps depicting a map of the island and an Italian flag, then went back to more overprints on Italian stamps, with a regular issue in 1924 where the overprint was applied diagonally, the Ferrucci issue in 1930, and the Garibaldi issue of 1932. A few types are readily available unused and cost under US$1, but the others, and all used copies, are in the US$10–60 range.

== Post war ==
When Italy capitulated to the Allies (8 September 1943), the island was occupied by Allied forces. Kastellorizo was assigned to Greece with the Paris Peace Treaties, 1947. In 1947 Greek stamps overprinted Σ.Δ.Δ. were used in the Dodecanese. The island formally joined the Greek State on 7 March 1948 together with the other Dodecanese islands.

== Sources ==
- Stanley Gibbons Ltd: various catalogues
- Sassone: Catalogo Specializzato dei Francobolli d'Italia e dei paesi Italiani, 2011
- Encyclopaedia of Postal Authorities
- Stuart Rossiter & John Flower: The Stamp Atlas
- Bertarelli, L.V. (1929). Guida d'Italia, Vol. XVII (in Italian). Milano: Consociazione Turistica Italiana.
