= Paraschivescu =

Paraschivescu is a Romanian surname. Notable people with the surname include:

- Dumitru Paraschivescu (1923–2006), Romanian racewalker
- Miron Radu Paraschivescu (1911–1971), Romanian poet, essayist, journalist
