= Ukhov =

Ukhov or Uhov is a Russian male surname, its feminine counterpart is Ukhova. It derives from the word ухо (ukho, meaning "ear") and may refer to:

- Ivan Ukhov (born 1986), Russian high jumper
- Vladimir Ukhov (1924–1996), Russian race walker
