= Theatre Terrific =

Disability theatre in Vancouver, Canada

- Formation: 1985
- Type: Theatre group
- Purpose: Disability theatre
- Location: Vancouver, British Columbia
- Website: www.theatreterrific.ca

Theatre Terrific, also known as the Theatre Terrific Society, is a Canadian disability theatre company based in Vancouver, British Columbia. It is western Canada's oldest disability theatre company.

== History ==
In 1984, Connie Hargrave began to conceive of a theatre company focussed on disabled performers. Theatre Terrific was officially founded in 1985 and was one of Canada's first mixed-ability theatre companies. At this time, Sue Lister was hired as an instructor and soon became Artistic Director. Their first show, a musical revue by Leonard Angel titled Dancing on the Head of a Pin with a Mouse in my Pocket, was performed at the 1986 Vancouver Fringe Festival.

Theatre Terrific launched its outreach program, Direct Access, in 1987. The program was a student-focussed performance group whose ensemble members attended any of Theatre Terrific's drama classes. In 1988, Lister started the process of auditioning and hiring for school tours composed of both abled and disabled actors. They toured across the province of British Columbia, performing commissioned plays at both primary and secondary schools.

In the early 1990s, Theatre Terrific began to receive international attention. They officially gained membership with the Vancouver Professional Theatre Alliance in 1992.

In 1995, the company appointed its second artistic director, Jamie Norris, ^{[2]:74} and Sue Lister returned home to the UK in 1996. Norris left in 1998 and was replaced by co-artistic directors Elaine Avila and Trevor Found. Avila and Found focussed on artistic education before resigning in 2000. In 2001, Liesl Lafferty became Theatre Terrific's artistic director. The company had not been active for over one year preceding Lafferty's appointment. She resigned in November 2004.

Susanna Uchatius became artistic director in 2005, at which point the company shifted away from explicitly disability-centred themes. As artistic director, Uchatius has produced some of her own plays, including Hello in 2019, which focussed on the untold story of Arthur Miller's son, Daniel.

== Artistic directors ==
- Sue Lister (1986-95)
- Jamie Norris (1995–1998)
- Elaine Avila and Trevor Found (1998–2000)
- Liesl Lafferty (2001–2004)
- Susanna Uchatius (2005–2023)
- Laen Hershler (2024-2025)
- Kevin Jesuino (2025- present)

== Production history ==
- Dancing on the Head of a Pin with a Mouse in my Pocket by Leonard Angel (Fringe 1986)
- Such Stuff as Dreams are Made On (cast collaboration for the Fringe 1987)
- One on One (forum theatre touring secondary schools 1988/9)
- Syllabub by Kico Gonzalez-Risso (touring primary schools 1990/91)
- Good-Looking Friends by John Lazarus (touring secondary schools 1992/93)
- Ring of Fire by Margaret Hollingsworth (touring primary schools 1994/95)
- Breeding Doubts by Sandra Ferens (Fringe 1995)
- Scraping the Surface by Lyle Victor Albert (1996)
- Step Right Up by Elaine Avila and Trevor Found (1999)
- Spiralling Within by Siobhan McCarthy (2003)
- Jumpin' Jack by Lyle Victor Albert (2004)
- Error of Eros' Arrows (2004)
- Ugly (2005)
- slowrunning (2006)
- Workin' (2007)
- doGs by Susanna Uchatius in collaboration with the cast (2007)
- The Glass Box (2008)
- The Secret Son (2009)
- dirty white by Susanna Uchatius (2010)
- I Love Mondays by Susanna Uchatius (2015)
- The Ridiculous Darkness by Wolfram Lotz - with Alley Theatre and Neworld Theatre (2017)
- Hello by Susanna Uchatius (2019)
- Digital Fracture: VOICES (2020)
- WINDOWS (2021 - online production)

== Awards ==
Year	Award	Category	Work	Result	Notes	Ref.
1994	Jessie Richardson Theatre Awards	Special Award for "Distinctive Mandate"	n/a	Won		
1994	Jessie Richardson Theatre Awards	Outstanding Script for Young Audiences	Good-Looking Friends	Nominated	for John Lazarus	
1995	Jessie Richardson Theatre Awards	Outstanding Script	Breeding Doubts	Nominated		
1995	Jessie Richardson Theatre Awards	Outstanding Ensemble Performance	Breeding Doubts	Nominated		
1996	Jessie Richardson Theatre Awards	Outstanding Performance by an Actor in a Lead Role	Scraping the Surface	Nominated	for Lyle Victor Albert	
1996	Jessie Richardson Theatre Awards	Outstanding Play or Musical	Scraping the Surface	Nominated		
2020	Jessie Richardson Theatre Awards	Outstanding Sound Design or Original Composition - Small Theatre	Hello	Nominated	for Angelo Moroni	

== Notable performers ==
- Jan Derbyshire (doGs - 2007)
