= Pekka Viljanen (athlete) =

Finnish racewalker

Personal information
- Nationality: Finnish
- Born: 13 June 1921
- Died: 2 December 1995 (aged 74)

Sport
- Sport: Athletics
- Event: Racewalking

Pekka Viljanen (13 June 1921 – 2 December 1995) was a Finnish racewalker. He competed in the Men's 50 Kilometres Walk at the 1952 Summer Olympics.
