= Jean Strunc =

French racewalker

Personal information
- Nationality: French
- Born: 17 June 1911

Sport
- Sport: Athletics
- Event: Racewalking

Jean Strunc (born 17 June 1911, date of death unknown) was a French racewalker. He competed in the men's 50 kilometres walk at the 1952 Summer Olympics.
