= Sassone =

Sassone is an Italian surname meaning "Saxon". Notable people with the surname include:

- Bob Sassone (born 1965), American writer
- Florindo Sassone (1912–1982), Argentinian violinist and composer
- Marco Sassone (born 1942), Italian painter
- Robert Sassone (basketball), American college basketball player and coach
- Robert Sassone (cyclist)
