= Antal Róka =

Hungarian racewalker

Medal record

Men's athletics

Representing Hungary

Olympic Games
Bronze medal – third place	1952 Helsinki	50 km walk

European Championships
Bronze medal – third place	1954 Bern	50 km walk

Antal Róka (June 25, 1927 – September 16, 1970) was a Hungarian athlete who competed mainly in the 50 kilometre walk. He competed for a Hungary in the 1952 Summer Olympics held in Helsinki, Finland in the 50 kilometre walk where he won the bronze medal.
