= Marco Sassone =

Italian painter

Marco Sassone, OMRI
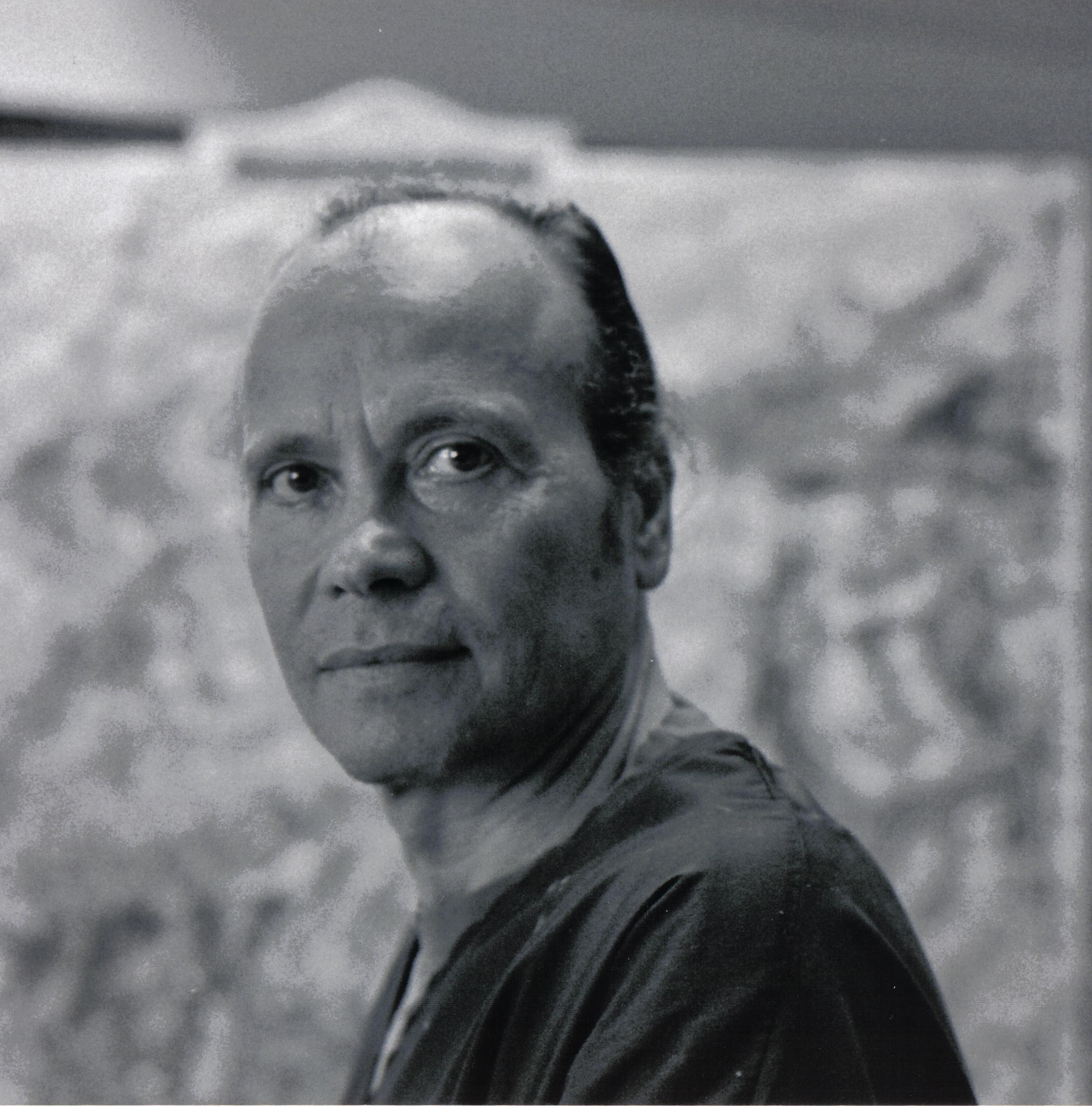
- Marco Sassone in his studio.
- Born: Marco Sassone; July 27, 1942; Campi Bisenzio, Tuscany, Kingdom of Italy
- Education: Istituto Galileo Galilei
- Known for: Painter
- Movement: Expressionism
- Awards: Gold medal award from the Italian Academy of Arts, Literature and Science, (1978) Knighted, Order to the Merit of the Italian Republic, (1982); Commendation from Los Angeles Mayor Tom Bradley in recognition 20 years of painting in California, (1987) Proclamation of "Marco Sassone Day in San Francisco", 30 March 1994 from Mayor of San Francisco Frank Jordan

Marco Sassone, OMRI (born 1942, in Campi Bisenzio) is an American-Italian painter. He moved to Florence in 1954, where his interest in painting began. He studied architectural drafting at the Istituto Galileo Galilei, and sold his first works, watercolor sketches, to tourists. Sassone studied with painter Silvio Loffredo, who had been a pupil of the Austrian artist Oskar Kokoschka. These artists formed Sassone's early influences.

In November 1967, after the destructive flood that had devastated Florence, Sassone traveled to the United States where he settled in California. He moved to Laguna Beach, where he exhibited at the annual Festival of the Arts. In the early 1980s Sassone moved his studio to San Francisco, where he encountered homelessness. He spent several years sketching the homeless people he met while observing life on the streets. This work formed the exhibition "Home on the Streets" which opened in 1994, at the Museo ItaloAmericano in San Francisco, and traveled to Los Angeles and Florence, Italy.

In 1982, Marco Sassone was knighted by the then president of Italy, Sandro Pertini, into the Order to the Merit of the Italian Republic and received a gold medal award from the Italian Academy of Arts, Literature and Science.

In 2005, Marco Sassone relocated to Toronto, Ontario, Canada.

== Early life and career ==
Sassone was born in Campi Bisenzio (Florence), Italy on July 27, 1942 during World War II. A childhood encounter with a homeless man in Campi Bisenzio first inspired the artist's lifelong interest in marginalized people and places in society. In 1950 he moved to Florence and attended the school Niccolò Machiavelli where he studied life drawings under professor Ugo Maturo; he attended then the Instituto Galileo Galilei where he met Silvio Loffredo, an important figurative painter, himself the pupil of Austrian master Oskar Kokoschka. He began exhibiting his work in numerous exhibitions in Italy including Galleria Mentana and Lo Sprone Art Centre in Florence. His personal experience of the destruction of the city of Florence during the flood of 1966 left a lasting impression that can be seen in his work, throughout his career.

== Work ==
=== Paintings ===
"Sassone is a Florentine by birth, ancestry and temperament. But his training and experience have combined to give him a view of the world that is truly international - spiritually as well as geographically. He has remained faithful to his innate genius and deeply-held convictions as an artist." (Charles Speroni, Dean, College of Fine Arts, UCLA)

Marco Sassone was born in Campi Bisenzio, a Tuscan village, in 1942. His family moved to Florence in 1954, and there he met painters Ottone Rosai and Ugo Maturo, who encouraged him to follow his interest in art. He enrolled at the Istituto Galileo Galilei, where he studied architectural drafting for several years. During this period he supported himself by selling watercolour sketches of Florence to tourists, many of whom were Americans, which increased his fluency in English.

Later, he studied with painter Silvio Loffredo, professor of art at the Accademia in Florence, a pupil himself of the Austrian master Oskar Kokoschka. Loffredo encouraged him to develop his own style and vision. For inspiration, Sassone studied the works of the 19th-century Italian impressionists, the Macchiaioli - Giovanni Fattori, Vito D’Ancona and Silvestro Lega. He began exhibiting his first works at this time. At the age of 25, he was selected to exhibit at Lo Sprone Cultural Center in Florence.

In November 1967, soon after the painful experience of the Florentine flood, Sassone traveled to the United States and settled in California. He later moved to Laguna Beach, a small seaside community, Mediterranean in geography and climate, with its own commitment to the arts. He became a regular exhibitor at the annual Festival of the Arts.

Throughout the seventies, he participated in a variety of exhibitions in the U.S. and abroad. Of his work then, the art critic for the Los Angeles Times, William Wilson, wrote: "Sassone is impressively gifted as a colorist and skilled in rendering reflections and color in light." (Wilson was reviewing a one-person show of his work at the Haggenmaker Galleries in Los Angeles, 11/14/75.)

In 1982, Marco Sassone was knighted by president of Italy, Sandro Pertini, into the "Order to the Merit of the Italian Republic" and received a gold medal award from the Italian Academy of Arts, Literature and Science.

In the early 1980s, Sassone moved his studio to San Francisco. In March 1988, the Los Angeles Municipal Art Gallery hosted the American Preview for his one-person exhibition to be held at the Bernheim-Jeune Gallery in Paris that April.

Art historian Donelson Hoopes published Sassone, a monograph, in concurrence with the artist's exhibition at the Laguna Art Museum (November - December 1979). With prescience, Hoopes had observed: "Sassone’s art has evolved from within, and such an organic, psychological and spiritual process may take his work along new and unforeseen paths." By the late eighties, Sassone had become increasingly concerned with social themes. He started working with the InterAid organization, donating paintings to raise money for the group's work with children in crisis. He also donated works to a non-profit group called Another Planet, based in Los Angeles, supporting that group's work with the homeless.

He began extensive - and personal - research on the homeless and painted a series of large canvasses and charcoal drawings portraying the life he observed on the streets. A number of these works have been exhibited at the Chicago International Art Exposition, the Basel Art Fair in Switzerland and the Jan Baum Gallery in Los Angeles, as well as in the exhibition Body Politic at the San Francisco Arts Commission Gallery and Issue of Choice at the Los Angeles Contemporary Exhibition (LACE).

In March 1994, his exhibition Home on the Streets opened at the Museo ItaloAmericano in San Francisco later traveling to Los Angeles and Florence, Italy. Kenneth Baker, art critic for the San Francisco Chronicle wrote about his work: "There is true technical brilliance here…In the drawings, his technique seems to discover fresh descriptive possibilities each time out." Home on the Streets traveled to Los Angeles in 1996 and Florence, Italy in 1997, where the exhibition was mounted in the Cloisters of the Santa Croce Church. Paola Bortolotti, art critic for La Nazione, writes: "The persistent theme does not carry a denunciation of a social problem, but it is rather the pretext to pour forth onto canvas the urgency of the brush strokes."

In 1997, Marco Sassone received a commission to create a 200 square foot mural in downtown San Francisco. The finished work is composed of five canvasses dedicated to the theme of Il Palio, and is presently in the collection of Santa Clara University, Santa Clara, California.

In May, 2001, the Museo ItaloAmericano in San Francisco inaugurated the exhibition, Master and Pupil, works by Oskar Kokoschka, Silvio Loffredo, and Sassone. Author Peter Selz, writing in the catalog about the artist's work, described the link between the three artists: "A canvas like Chinese Reds (1990) in scarlet color relates to the chromatic scheme of his teacher’s Angel of Death (1998), while alarming paintings like Marlboro Country (1990) with its human skulls spread in the foreground, or Coit Tower Night (1988) – a painting of deep blue water, a brown hill and a violent purple sky – all done with an agitated brush, elicit a fervent emotion, comparable to the sensations evoked by the canvases of Kokoschka himself."

The Palazzo Ducale Museum in Massa-Carrara, Italy presented his retrospective exhibition in March–April, 2002 with the publication of a catalog written by Massimo Bertozzi. The exhibition was reviewed by La Nazione, Florence and La Repubblica, Rome. Ilaria Bonuccelli writes for La Repubblica, "The man with blue eyes stares out at you. No concessions made. He offers you – perhaps forces upon you – a magnified view of trashed humanity. The kind that rummages around along the sidewalks of San Francisco. His pupils gape at an interior world which he invites you to enter, without knocking. The brush-strokes are merciless. As a man and as a painter, Sassone, sucked up onto the world of the homeless from the time he was a child, at Campi Bisenzio.

The exhibition Master and Pupil held in San Francisco in 2001 was installed in the Cloister of Sant’ Agostino in Pietrasanta, Italy in 2003. The museum published a catalog with an essay by the art writer Domenico Pugliese. Milly Mostardini wrote in a review for Il Tirreno: "From Kokoschka to Loffredo and Sassone: The lessons are passed on from master and pupil. Sassone’s expressionism leads to visionary transformations, in an intense dance of chromatic impastos, with furious, explosive strokes of pigment."

In 2005, Marco Sassone relocated his studio to Toronto, Ontario, Canada.

In 2008, his exhibition entitled Marco Sassone: Toronto, opened on April 3 at the Odon Wagner Contemporary. Jonathan Goodman, art critic for Art in America, wrote in the exhibition catalog, "Sassone’s audience approaches his work knowing that the paintings are in dialogue with a tradition going back to the early twentieth century. His expressionism escapes the epithet of anachronistic, however, by being so sharply lived. While his works are not overly emotional, they gain success because they relate to a complete life of the imagination in which feelings and intellect combine. " Deirdre Kelly wrote in the Globe and Mail: "With gestural brush strokes and an expressionistic use of color, Mr. Sassone romanticizes such banal views as a Carlaw parking lot and the westbound Gardiner Expressway."

He received a commission to create a mural for the lobby of the Bellagio, a glass tower in downtown Toronto. The artist prepared drawings and a final study in pastel, in scale for the space. The completed work, composed of three panels and titled Waterfront, was installed in late October.

In the following year, Sassone participated at the International Art Fair, Palm Beach 3 in Florida and in the Group exhibition Summerset at David Findlay Jr. Fine Art, New York. The artist lectured at Seaton House, the largest homeless shelter in Toronto.

In 2010, he returned to San Francisco to attend the October 1st inauguration of his one-man show installed in the splendid space of the Shrine of Saint Francis of Assisi. He traveled to Rome for his premiere exhibition Santuario at the Palazzo dell’ Informazione. The exhibition was composed of thirty works featured urban landscapes from his Toronto series. The Adnkronos news agency produced a video-interview titled Marco Sassone - Quando l'anima resta inchiodata alla tela. (Marco Sassone – When the Soul is Nailed to the Canvas).

In 2012, the exhibition Marco Sassone: Watercolours opened at Berenson Fine Art, Toronto. Peter Clothier wrote in the Huffington Post: "These dark paintings are, after all, not primarily about the darkness that pervades them, but about the light that manages to shine through."

In October, he traveled to Bartlesville, Oklahoma to attend the opening of his exhibition Architecture and Nature installed at the Price Tower Art Center, a museum designed by Frank Lloyd Wright.

In 2014, his exhibition Oil and Water was inaugurated at the San Angelo Museum of Fine Art in Texas.

In 2016, the Bata Museum in Toronto, Canada opened the exhibition Marco Sassone: His Boots and Other Works accompanied by a catalogue written by Deirdre Kelly. CBC National Television, Canada broadcast a feature profile of the artist with an interview at the museum and at his studio in Toronto.

In 2017, Berenson Fine Art mounted the exhibition Marco Sassone: Viaticus, a body of work representing "a microcosm of collective memory, giving expression to historical allusions, as a literal and philosophical journey along tracks and converging furrows that visually draw the eye on a voyage." The exhibition was part of a feature article that appeared in the Toronto Star on November 1, 2017.

=== Drawings and Pastels ===
Sassone began his career as a draftsman in Florence where he studied life drawing and the art of chiaroscuro with professor Ugo Maturo. Throughout his career his employment of charcoal and pastel has been ever present. 1994 he presented a series of charcoal portraits for his exhibition Home on the Streets at Museo Italo Americano, San Francisco reviewed by art critic Kenneth Baker who wrote: "There is true technical brilliance here... In the drawings, his technique seems to discover fresh descriptive possibilities each time out." And again in 2002, for his retrospective exhibition in Italy, the Palazzo Ducale Museum selected a series of charcoals and pastels depicting homeless portraits. Ilaria Bonuccelli wrote for La Repubblica: "The man with blue eyes stares out at you. No concessions made. His pupils gape at an interior world which he invites you to enter, without knocking."

=== Studios ===
Sassone first made art at home in Florence. He painted on location in Italy, Greece, England and departed for California in 1967 where he established his studio in Laguna Beach at the top of a 4-story home overlooking the Pacific. In 1981 he moved to San Francisco and converted a large loft with sky lights and enormous industrial windows facing north. It was here that he painted his entire series for Home on the Streets from 1990 to 1994, which included all of his charcoal portraits and his large-scale canvases of the homeless, which he painted on an enormous, specially constructed wood easel. In 2005 he moved to Toronto Canada and reconstructed an old loft in a former Colgate factory in the east side of town; most of his work dealing with railroad tracks and urban industrial sites were produced in this studio for the Toronto exhibition of 2008 and the 2011 exhibition in Oklahoma at Price Tower Art Centre.

=== Social Commitment ===
On November 23, 1980, an earthquake struck the Irpinia region of Italy, and 500 000 families were made homeless. Marco Sassone quickly organized an auction with Sotheby Park Bernet, "Sassone Earthquake Benefit" to raise funds for the victims made homeless by the earthquake. The artist donated 18 original works which raised $17 000. These funds contributed to the reconstruction of a family farm house destroyed in the Valva region.

In the following years, the artist has organized other auctions of his work, donating the proceeds to charity, including the Inter-Aid organization. In 1984, Sassone's work was auctioned to raise $28 000 to provide medical attention and food to impoverished children. From 1990 to present the artist has donated artwork to the annual Oziku Foundation auction in California for aid to children with cancer.

== Exhibitions ==
In 1967, Sassone, along with Pietro Annigoni and Silvio Loffredo was invited to participate at the Lo Sprone Centro di Cultura for the exhibition Perchè non si Dimentichi, commemorating the flood of Florence. His work was selected in 1977 for the annual exhibition at the National Academy of Design in New York. He participated in 1990 at the Chicago International Art Exposition and Basel Art Fair. The Los Angeles Contemporary Exhibitions (LACE) presented his work in the show Issue of Choice in 1992. In 2001 Sassone was a part of the exhibition Master and Pupil at the Museo-Italo Americano, San Francisco with Oskar Kokoschka ad Silvio Loffredo. He was also featured in the exhibition Sommerset at David Findlay Jr, New York in 2009 and 2010. Comprehensive solo exhibitions of Sassone's work have been organized by the Laguna Art Museum in Laguna Beach, California (1979); Los Angeles Municipal Art Gallery and Bernheim-Jeune, Paris (1988); Italian Cultural Institute, San Francisco (1989); Buschlen-Mowatt Gallery, Vancouver, British Columbia, Canada (1990); Museo Italo-Americano, San Francisco (1994); Pasquale Iannetti Gallery, San Francisco (1996); Cloisters of Santa Croce, Florence (1997); MB Modern, New York and Odon Wagner Gallery, Toronto (2000); Isetan Gallery, Tokyo (2001); Palazzo Ducale, Massa-Carrara, Italy (2002); Cloister of Sant'Agostino, Pietrasanta, Italy (2003); SCAPE, Corona del Mar, California (2007); National Shrine of S. Francis, San Francisco (2010); Palazzo dell'Informazione, Rome, Italy (2010); Price Tower Arts Center, Oklahoma (2012); Berenson Fine Art, Toronto (2012); San Angelo Museum of Fine Art, Texas (2014); Bata Museum, Toronto (2016); Orange Coast College, Costa Mesa, California (2016).

== Home on the Streets ==
Sassone's encounter with a homeless man named Willie in San Francisco lead to an exhaustive personal research by the artist. Sassone lived and worked among the homeless of that city, sketching and talking with the people he met. These sketches resulted in the exhibition, Home on the Streets, which consisted of large-scale oil paintings and intimate pastel portraits depicting life on the streets. This exhibition has helped to raise awareness and funds for various homeless organizations in the United States. The artist has donated his work to benefit numerous charities, including Inter-Aid and Another Planet.

== Reviews ==
Excerpts from selected reviews and catalog essays

". . .Evolving a vision and style of painting distinctly his own. . ." - FRIDOLF JOHNSON, American Artist, New York (July 1980)

"One of the foremost colorists working in America today, Sassone is a gestural painter, an artist who becomes totally absorbed in the act of painting. The result is work powerfully expressive, evocative, and sometimes haunting in its beauty." - JANET DOMINIK, Sassone, Bernheim-Jeune, exhibition catalog, Paris, France (April 13 - May 4, 1988)

"The persistent theme does not carry a denunciation of a social problem, but it is rather the pretext to pour forth onto canvas the urgency of the brush strokes…Here it is the water that becomes the turbulent element, troubled by vestiges and shadows resulting from distant echoes of Sassone’s teacher, Silvio Loffredo, who paints with similar, quick brush strokes, trailing onto the canvas a wake of vibrant color." - PAOLA BORTOLOTTI, La Nazione, Florence, Italy (May 16, 1997)

"These places are seen from the distance of affection mixed with longing, of memory mixed with the immediacy of everyday experience. Through Sassone’s vision of the two worlds in which he will always live, we can experience what it is like to find ourselves far from where we started, yet be at home wherever we are." - MARIA PORGES, MB Modern, Marco Sassone exhibition catalog, New York (December 7 – 22, 2000)

"Sassone’s paintings explode with color and light. His passion for architecture and water is obvious. From his scenes of Venice canals to the streets of San Francisco, Sassone uses his cities not as a subject but rather as the canvas. He paints over the city with his interpretation of the pace and mood he sees." - FRANCIS MILL, NY Arts, New York, (May 2001)

"A canvas like Chinese Reds (1990) in its scarlet color relates to the chromatic scheme of his teacher’s Angel of Death (1998), while alarming paintings like Marlboro Country (1990) with its human skulls spread in the foreground, or Coit Tower Night (1988) – a painting of deep blue water, a brown hill and a violent purple sky – all done with an agitated brush, elicit a fervent emotion, comparable to the sensations evoked by the canvases of Kokoschka himself." - PETER SELZ, Museo ItaloAmericano, Master and Pupil exhibition catalog, San Francisco (May 10 – July 8, 2001)

"In these persuasively lonely and poignant paintings, the grey-blue tracks, which invariably look like tracks that have borne no trains for decades, begin in the foreground and wander off into the distance. They thread this way and that through foggy grey middle grounds and out into oblivion, the flecking and dabbing of Sassone’s brush reading now as the rusting, flaking and slow ruin that comes with abandonment." - GARY MICHAEL DAULT, The Globe and Mail, Toronto, Ontario, Canada (April 12, 2008)

"As products of Sassone’s hand, even such unsightly things as expressways and parking lots become magical, not only because they are cast in an ethereal, post-impressionistic glow, but also because the artist sees them as dynamic, muscular roots into the heart of a vibrant city." - DAVID BALZER, Toronto Life, Toronto, Ontario, Canada (April 2008)

"These dark paintings are, after all, not primarily about the darkness that pervades them, but about the light that manages to shine through." - PETER CLOTHIER, The Huffington Post, Canada (March 2012)

== Catalogues, monographs, documentaries, interviews ==
BERTOZZI, MASSIMO. Marco Sassone. Exhibition catalogue. Essays by Peter Clothier, Tomasso Paloscia, Peter Selz. Massa, Italy. Palazzo Ducale Museum, 2002, 134 pp., Ill. (Italian /English text).

CLOTHIER, PETER. Marco Sassone. Close to the Bone. Exhibition catalogue. San Francisco, Italian Cultural Institute, 1991, 24 pp., ill.

CLOTHIER, PETER. Marco Sassone. Home on the Streets. Exhibition catalogue. Foreword by Tom Bradley, Robert A. Whyte. San Francisco, Museo ItaloAmericano, 1994, 64 pp., ill. (English/Italian text). ISBN 0-935194-08-8

DOMINIK, JANET B. Sassone. Exhibition catalogue. Foreword by Louis Stern. Paris, France, Bernheim-Jeune, 1988, 108 pp., ill. (French/English/Italian text). ISBN 0-935194-03-7

GOODMAN, JONATHAN. Marco Sassone. The Toronto Series. Exhibition catalogue. Odon Wagner Contemporary, Toronto, Ontario, Canada, 2008. ISBN 978-0-9781635-9-4

GLADYSZ, THOMAS. Marco Sassone: New Paintings. Diane Nelson Gallery, San Francisco, California, 1989.

HOOPES, DONELSON F. Sassone. Introduction by Dean Charles Speroni, U.C.L.A., Florence, Italy, Arti Grafiche Il Torchio, 1979, 302 pp., ill. ISBN 0-935194-00-2

MARVIN, MARIAH. Marco Sassone Body of Water. Exhibition catalogue. San Francisco, Pasquale Iannetti Galleries, 1993, 48 pp., ill.

PALOSCIA, TOMMASO. Marco Sassone. The Roots of Marco Sassone. Exhibition catalogue. Florence, Italy, Galleria d’Arte Mentana, 1997, 76 pp., ill. (Italian/English text).

PORGES, MARIA. Marco Sassone. Exhibition catalogue. New York, MB Modern, 2000, 20 pp., ill.

SELZ, PETER. Il Maestro e l’allievo / Master and Pupil – Oskar Kokoschka, Silvio Loffredo, Marco Sassone. Exhibition catalogue. San Francisco, Museo Italo Americano, 2001, 64 pp., ill. (English/Italian text). ISBN 0-935194-11-8

BOTTO, DANIELA. Viva Domenica. Toronto, Telelatino, April 12, 2008. Interview.

D’APRILE, LAURA. Arts and Entertainment, Toronto, Omni 1-TV Channel 47, May 17, 2012. Interview.

GUILBAULT, ROSE. Sunday on 7. San Francisco, KGO-TV, May 1, 1994. Interview.

HOWARD, DAVID. Marco Sassone. San Francisco, 1990, 25 minutes, color and sound. Video documentary.

WILSON, JOHN. Sassone. Los Angeles, Fine Arts Films, Inc., 1976, 20 min., color and sound.

KELLY, DEIRDRE. Marco Sassone: His Boots and Other Works. Exhibition Catalogue, Bata Shoe Museum, Toronto, Ontario, Canada. 2016, 36 pp., ill.

FERNANDEZ, MERELLA. Italian Painter Marco Sassone discusses Da Vinci on CTV News Channel. CTV News, November 17, 2017.

LIGHTLE-QUAN, DEBBIE. Our Toronto. CBC, June 18, 2016.

KELLY, DEIRDRE. The Urban Made Poetic: In Conversation with Marco Sassone. Critics at Large, 2012.

== Personal life ==
Marco Sassone was married in 1972 to Diane Nelson in Florence, Italy, with whom he has one son, Nicola. They divorced in 1983.

Sassone was remarried in 2006 to Russian writer Emilia Ianeva, in Toronto.
