= Pavel Kazankov =

Soviet racewalker (1926–2018)

Personal information
- Nationality: Soviet
- Born: 30 June 1926 Dmitriyevka, Russian SFSR, USSR
- Died: 19 January 2018 (aged 91)

Sport
- Sport: Athletics
- Event: Racewalking

Pavel Kazankov (30 June 1926 – 19 January 2018) was a Soviet racewalker. He competed in the men's 50 kilometres walk at the 1952 Summer Olympics. He died on 19 January 2018 at the age of 91.
