= Rudi Lüttge =

German racewalker (1922–2016)

Personal information
- Full name: Rudolf Wilhelm August Lüttge
- Nationality: German
- Born: 19 December 1922 Ilsenburg, Germany
- Died: 23 September 2016 (aged 93) Bad Schwartau, Germany
- Height: 1.78 m (5 ft 10 in)
- Weight: 65 kg (143 lb)

Sport
- Sport: Athletics
- Event: Racewalking
- Club: Büssing Braunschweig; Eintracht Braunschweig

Achievements and titles
- Personal best: 50 km – 4:38:40 (1952)

Rudi Lüttge (19 December 1922 – 23 September 2016) was a German racewalker, who competed in the 1952 Summer Olympics.

== Career ==
Lüttge competed for the clubs BSG Büssing Braunschweig (from 1938 to 1941) and Eintracht Braunschweig (from 1941 on). During his career, he won 16 national championships – 11 in individual competitions and five with the racewalking team of Eintracht Braunschweig.

In 1948, Lüttge set an unofficial world record in the 30 kilometres race walk in Braunschweig's Eintracht-Stadion. The record was never recognized by the International Association of Athletics Federations, as the German Athletics Association had not yet been readmitted as a member after World War II.

Lüttge competed in the 50 km walk at the 1952 Summer Olympics in Helsinki, where he finished 13th.

In 1988, he was inducted into the hall of fame of the Lower Saxon Institute of Sports History. He died on 23 September 2016 at the age of 93.
