= Yehuda Chitrik =

Yehuda Chitrik (August 28, 1899 – February 14, 2006) was an author and Mashpia in the Chabad Hasidic community in Brooklyn, New York. He had written the Reshimot Devorim and From my Father's Shaboos Table, a Treasury of Chabad Chassidic Stories.

Chitrik was born in 1899 in Krasnaluk, a small Jewish shtetl in Belarus. In 1926 he married Kayla Tomarkin.

== Writings ==
- Reshimot Devorim, four volumes.
- From My Father's Shabbos Table, A Treasury of Chabad Chassidic Stories
