= Nicholas Swarbrick =

Nicholas Joseph Swarbrick (14 November 1898 – 2 February 2006) was, at age 107, the final surviving English merchant sailor of the First World War at the time of his death.

He was born in Grimsargh, near Preston in Lancashire, where his father was a farmer. His mother died of tuberculosis when he was only six and he was later to lose his only sister to the same illness. He was only four when she first fell ill and, as she was infectious, he was not able to come near her because of her coughing. His elder (by 11 years) sister was forced to run the household.

He attended Winckley Square School, a Jesuit school in Preston, but dropped out at 14 after being administered especially severe corporal punishment.

As a radio officer in the Merchant Navy, he made several transatlantic crossings to transport horses and troops. He left the Navy in 1929 to help his father's business, later taking up an interest in cattle breeding.

He never married and died in his native Grimsargh on 2 February 2006, aged 107.
