= Josef Doležal =

Medal record

Men's athletics

Representing Czechoslovakia

Olympic Games
Silver medal – second place	1952 Helsinki	50 km walk

European Championships
Gold medal – first place	1954 Bern	10 km walk
Silver medal – second place	1954 Bern	50 km walk

Josef Doležal (Czech pronunciation: [ˈjozɛv ˈdolɛʒal]; 12 December 1920 in Příbram – 28 January 1999 in Prague) was a Czech athlete who competed mainly in the 50 kilometre walk.

He competed for Czechoslovakia in the 1952 Summer Olympics held in Helsinki, Finland in the 50 kilometre walk where he won the silver medal.

Records
Preceded by John Mikaelsson; Vladimir Golubnichy	Men's 20km Walk World Record Holder; 5 June 1955 – 23 September 1955; 25 July 1956 – 13 April 1957	Succeeded by Vladimir Golubnichy; Vladimir Guk
Preceded by Viggo Ingvorsen; Vladimir Ukhov	Men's 50km Walk World Record Holder; 4 August 1946 – 29 August 1952; 12 September 1954 – 17 November 1955	Succeeded by Vladimir Ukhov; Anatoliy Yegorov
