= Elena Carter Richardson =

American ballerina and dance instructor

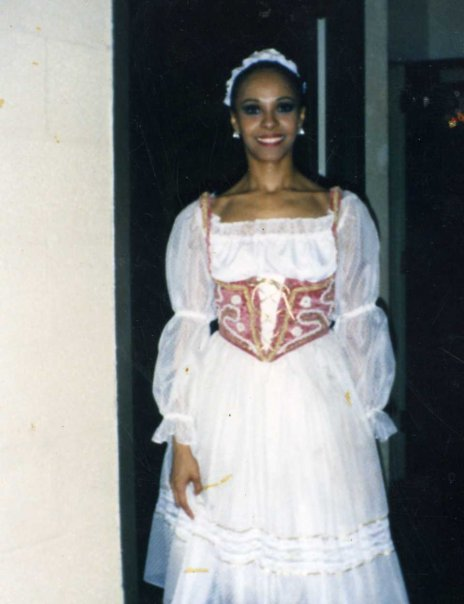
Elena Carter Richardson in costume as Swanhilda in Coppélia.

Elena Carter Richardson (26 December 1948 – 4 February 2006) was an American ballerina and dance instructor.

Born and raised in Mexico City, Mexico, she trained at the Academia de Ballet de Coyoacán, going on to be a principal dancer at Compania Nacional de Danza, and with Ballet Classico 70.

Richardson later joined Dance Theatre of Harlem and toured the world as a principal before taking time off to have children in 1982. She moved to Portland, Oregon and became a principal in Pacific Ballet Theatre and Oregon Ballet Theatre as well as a faculty member in the Performing Arts Program at Jefferson High School and at Da Vinci Arts Middle School.

Richardson was diagnosed with cancer in 2000 and died from it in 2006.
