= Knut-Olaf Haustein =

German physician

Knut-Olaf Haustein (20 September 1934 – 10 February 2006) was a German physician best known for his work studying the effects of tobacco smoking.
