= Donelson Hoopes =

American art historian

- Born: Donelson Farquhar Hoopes, Jr. December 3, 1932; Philadelphia, Pennsylvania, United States
- Died: February 22, 2006 (aged 73); Bangor, Maine, United States
- Occupations: Art historian Curator

Academic background
- Education: University of Pennsylvania

Academic work
- Discipline: Art history
- Sub-discipline: Nineteenth- and twentieth-century American art
- Institutions: Portland Museum of Art; Corcoran Gallery of Art; Brooklyn Museum; Los Angeles County Museum of Art; Thomas Cole National Historic Site

Donelson Farquhar Hoopes, Jr. (December 3, 1932 – February 22, 2006) was an American art historian and curator. Hoopes was a scholar of nineteenth- and twentieth-century American art, especially the work of Thomas Eakins, Winslow Homer, John Singer Sargent, and Marco Sassone.

== Career ==
Born in Philadelphia to Donelson Wood and Esther Taylor Dechert, Hoopes served in the United States Army from 1953 to 1955, rising to the rank of Sergeant. He then received a Bachelor of Arts from the University of Pennsylvania in 1960.

In that year, Hoopes began his curatorial career as Director of the Portland Museum of Art. In 1962, he moved to the Corcoran Gallery of Art for a role as curator. Two years later, Hoopes curated the landmark exhibition there titled The Private World of John Singer Sargent. Hoopes was thus credited with restoring the reputation of the artist John Singer Sargent.

In 1965, Hoopes was hired as Curator of Paintings and Sculptures at the Brooklyn Museum until 1969. Three years later, he became Senior Curator of American Art at the Los Angeles County Museum of Art until 1976, when he resigned due to the museum board's decisions to mount the landmark exhibition Two Centuries of Black American Art, despite the curatorial staff having rejected the exhibition proposal. Contemporaneous reporting described Hoopes' decision to resign, along with several colleagues, as having been made due to perceived overreach by the board into curatorial decisions, although several curators at the museum had refused to attend the proposal presentation given by the guest curator, arts educator and artist David C. Driskell. Hoopes also was nominated to serve on the Committee for the Preservation of the White House by United States President Jimmy Carter from 1977 to 1980. Three years after that, Hoopes took the role of Director of the Thomas Cole National Historic Site, a post that he held until retirement in 1997.

Hoopes resided in Steuben before his death in Bangor in 2006.

== See also ==
- List of people from Philadelphia
- List of University of Pennsylvania people
