= Pino Dordoni =

Italian racewalker (1926–1998)

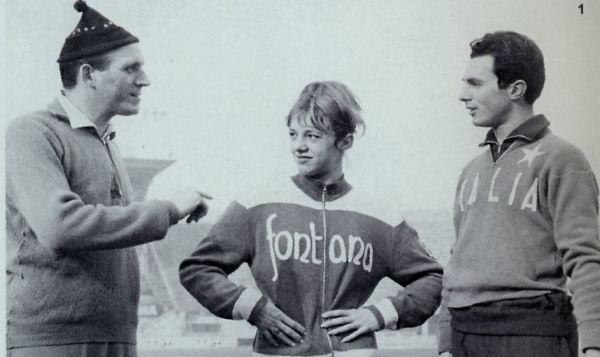
- Pino Dordoni (left), with Donata Govoni and Livio Berruti

Personal information
- Nationality: Italian
- Born: 28 June 1926 Piacenza, Italy
- Died: 24 October 1998 (aged 72) Piacenza, Italy

Sport
- Sport: Athletics
- Event: Race walk
- Club: Diana PC

Achievements and titles
- Personal bests: 10km w.: 45:42.2 (1954); 20km w.: 1:32:38 (1960); 50km w.: 4:28:07 (1952)
Medal record
Men's athletics
Representing Italy
Olympic Games
Gold medal – first place	1952 Helsinki	50 km walk
European Championships
Gold medal – first place	1950 Brussels	50 km walk
Mediterranean Games
Gold medal – first place	1951 Alexandria	10 km walk
Gold medal – first place	1955 Barcelona	10 km walk

Giuseppe Dordoni (28 June 1926 – 24 October 1998) was an Italian athlete who competed mainly in the 50 kilometre race walk.

== Biography ==
He competed for Italy at the 1952 Summer Olympics held in Helsinki, Finland, where he won the gold medal in the men's 50 kilometre walk event. In 1950 he became European champion.

Dordoni finished second behind Ken Matthews in the 2 miles walk event at the 1961 AAA Championships.

== Achievements ==
Year	Competition	Venue	Position	Event	Performance	Note
1950	European Championships	(Belgium) Brussels	1st	50 km walk	4:40:43	
1952	Olympic Games	(Finland) Helsinki	1st	50 km walk	4:28:07.8	

== National titles ==
Pino Dordoni has won 26 times the individual national championship.

- 11 wins on 10000 metres walk (1946, 1947, 1948, 1949, 1950, 1951, 1952, 1953, 1954, 1955, 1957)
- 10 wins on 20 km walk (1947, 1948, 1949, 1950, 1952, 1953, 1954, 1955, 1956, 1957)
- 5 wins on 50 km walk (1949, 1950, 1952, 1953, 1954)

== See also ==
- Legends of Italian sport - Walk of Fame
- FIDAL Hall of Fame
- Italian Athletics Championships - Multi winners
