= The Southside Group =

Theatre company in Glasgow, Scotland

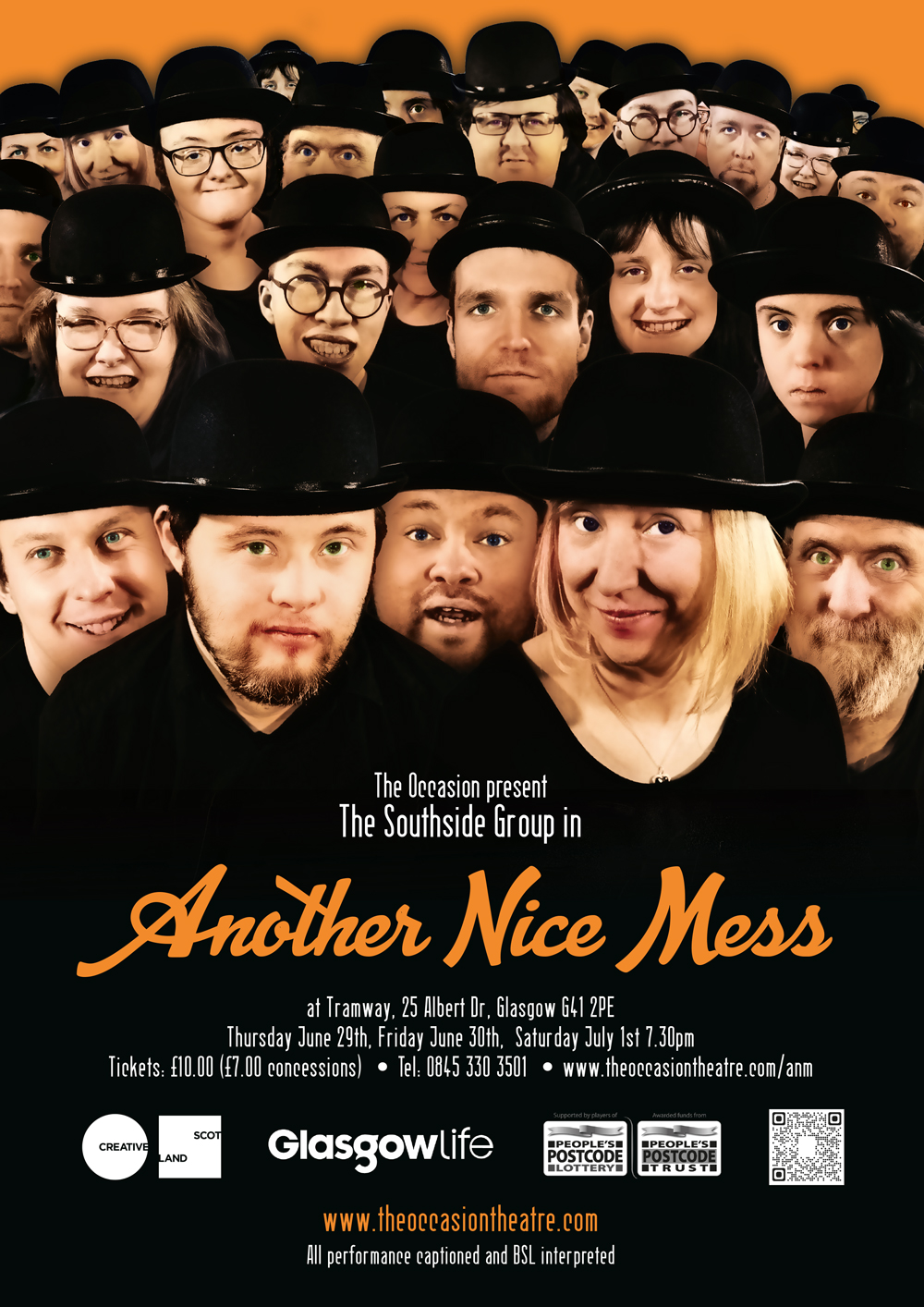
The Southside Group in 'Another Nice Mess' at Tramway, Glasgow in 2023.

Formed in January 2020, The Southside Group is a Glasgow based theatre company based on the South Side of Glasgow designed to increase opportunities for adults with learning disabilities to become involved in theatre.

The group was set up by Peter Clerke and Catherine Gillard of The Occasion Theatre Company, both of whom studied under Philippe Gaulier in Paris.

Before forming The Occasion in 2010, both Clerke and Gillard shared the Artistic Directorship of the Scottish touring theatre company, Benchtours (1991–2009), as well as working extensively with Blue Apple Theatre and Lung Ha's Theatre Company amongst others.

Members of The Southside Group range in age from late teens to sixty, and all cast members have some degree of learning disability.

Regular collaborators include writers Stewart Ennis and Michael Duke, set designer Ali Maclaurin, and musician and graphic designer Richard Williams.

== Productions ==
=== Another Nice Mess ===
The Southside Group played three sell-out performances of Another Nice Mess at Tramway, Glasgow from June 29 to July 1, 2023.

Written by Stewart Ennis, the show was set in June 1947 and was a fictionalised account of events that took place around Stan Laurel and Oliver Hardy's appearance at The Glasgow Empire Theatre that year.

Joyce McMillan in The Scotsman wrote: "A strikingly well-made show that succeeds in transporting us not only to the Glasgow of 75 years ago, but also into a world of joyful ensemble work that lifts the heart, and inspires as much as it entertains."
