= Nadia Nadarajah =

Deaf Sri Lankan-British actress

Nadia Nadarajah is a British actress. She has appeared on a number of stage shows, including a Shakespeare's Globe production of Antony and Cleopatra, as well as playing a part in the TV series Vampire Academy.

She is Deaf and uses the British Sign Language.

== Early life ==
Born to Sri Lankan parents, Nadarajah grew up in Luton. Her older brother is also deaf. After attending a mainstream primary school with support, Nadarajah boarded at Mary Hare Grammar School in Berkshire. She began her studies at the University of Hertfordshire.

== Career ==
At 21, she moved to Australia, where she joined the committee of the SAAD (South-Australian Association of the Deaf) and campaigned on several issues. She has finished her BA Honours Degree in Applied Arts at University of South Australia. She worked as Sign Language Teacher.

She trained as an actress at the International Visual Theatre in Paris in physical and bilingual acting. After spending three years teaching Sign Language on Reunion Island, she returned to the UK. She has appeared in Deafinitely Theatre productions including Shakespearean plays such as Love's Labour's Lost and A Midsummer Night's Dream, and other plays like Grounded.

Other credits include Can I start again Please, Tanika's Journey and A Christmas Carol.

In 2018 she played Guildenstern in Shakespeare's Globe production of Hamlet.

In 2024 she played leading role, Cleopatra Queen of Egyptian in Shakespeare's Globe production of Antony and Cleopatra.

== Personal life ==
Nadarajah lives in Peterborough. She was previously married to a Frenchman, whom she divorced in 2008.

She is fluent in five sign languages (British, French, Australian, American and French Creole).
