= Pamela O'Malley =

- Born: 12 July 1929; Dublin, Ireland
- Died: 12 February 2006 (aged 76); Madrid, Spain
- Education: University College Dublin
- Occupations: Bohemian; Educationalist; Radical
- Spouse: Gainor Crist (m. 1952; died 1964)

Pamela O'Malley (12 July 1929 – 12 February 2006) was an Irish-Spanish bohemian, educationalist and radical. She taught at the British School in Madrid until her retirement in 2003 and was also a member of the Spanish Communist Party. O'Malley was a co-founder of the Workers' Commissions's education branch and contributed to the passing of the General Assembly of the College of Doctors and Graduates of Madrid of the Alternative Public School in 1974. She worked to establish and develop the Madrid Education Union and the State Federation of the Workers' Commissions and was also involved in feminist and radical politics. The City Council of Madrid voted to name a thoroughfare in the city after O'Malley in February 2019.

== Early life ==
On 12 July 1929, O'Malley was born in Dublin, Ireland, to the Limerick spirit, tea and wine importer Patrick O'Malley, and his wife Kathleen (née Bonass). Raised in Limerick, she had an elder brother and was a second cousin to Donogh O'Malley. She made her first visit to a sherry supplier in Spain in 1947, and was impressed at the country being more puritanical than Ireland. O'Malley went to University College Dublin, becoming friends with literary figures Brendan Behan and Kate O'Brien.

== Career ==
She returned to Spain in 1953 and settled in Madrid. In the 1960s, O'Malley became a member of the Spanish Communist Party and co-established the illegal Workers' Commission's education branch, which was an underground trade union movement. She said she joined the Communist Party because it was the only one with sufficient organisation and coherence to establish "an effective underground opposition to Franco" and was impressed by its strategy to reconcile Spain and promote democracy as it wanted to avoid another Spanish Civil War. O'Malley was twice expelled from the party for her independent thinking, only to be readmitted. Her political activities saw her serve two prison sentences; while serving her sentence at Carabanchel Prison for distribution and possession of communist material, O'Malley taught fellow inmates to read and write.

She later became a member of the staff at the British School. Several of O'Malley's pupils were children of leading Franco government members, and she adopted dual Irish and Spanish nationality. She was a contributor to the passing and the approval of the General Assembly of the College of Doctors and Graduates of Madrid of the Alternative Public School in 1974. Following the restoration of democracy in Spain, O'Malley worked to establish and develop the Madrid Education Union and the State Federation of the Workers' Commissions. She continued to remain involved in feminist and radical politics, regularly taking part in street protests over impositions imposed on women by the Taliban in Afghanistan. O'Malley was one of several Eurocommunist activists to be expelled from the Spanish Communist Party in 1982. She joined in forming the United Left but did not always concur with their views and gradually became sympathetic to the Socialist Party.

In 1995, O'Malley authored the doctoral thesis on the education movement under Franco that she completed in the United Kingdom. She also co-edited the book Education Reform in Democratic Spain with Oliver Boyd-Barrett. She retired from the British School in 2003. The following year, O'Malley received the Medal of Merit in Labour by the Ministry of Labour "for her work to further Spanish education." That same year, she was appointed President of the Assembly for Cooperation and Peace, a non-governmental organization promoting racial harmony between different races of children and constructing schools and undertaking other projects in the countries in the Third World. She was also a recipient of the Civil Order of Alfonso X, the Wise from the Ministry of Education.

== Personal life ==
O'Malley was an avid bullring fan and was described as having "an encyclopaedic knowledge of the history and art of bullfighting." She was married the American divorcé Gainor Crist in Gibraltar in 1952. They did not have any children, and she did not remarry following Crist's death in 1964. On 12 February 2006, O'Malley died suddenly from a stroke in Madrid. A memorial service was held for her at the Irish Labour History Museum, Dublin, on 2 April.

== Personality and legacy ==
The Irish Times wrote of her, "For her Irish friends, she will be remembered more for culture than politics, and most of all for her exuberant and generous sense of life." Seamus Heaney noted the aspect of O'Malley being "amicable, intellectually springy, intoxicatingly companionable Irishwoman, capable of banter and laughter but equally capable of passionate argument and advocacy." Manus O’Riordan said of her, "Pamela O’Malley’s own undying voice is the exuberant voice of the democratic Spain of today that she herself fought so courageously to bring about by peaceful methods of struggle." In February 2019, the City Council of Madrid voted to name a city thoroughfare Calle Pamela O'Malley after O'Malley, making her the second local women to be recognised this way on the Iberian Peninsula.
