= Peter Clothier =

British writer and art critic

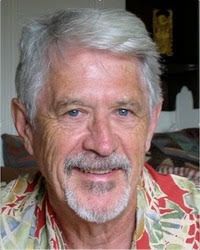
- Born: 1 August 1936 (age 90); Newcastle-upon-Tyne
- Website: peterclothier.com

Peter Clothier (born 1 August 1936) is a British writer and art critic who has published reviews, books of poetry, novels, and non-fiction works, mostly with a focus on art and artists.

== Early life and education ==
Clothier was born in Newcastle upon Tyne and spent his early years in English country villages. His father Reverend Canon Harry L. Clothier was an Anglican minister.

Clothier attended Windlesham House School and graduated from Lancing College in 1953. He went on to attend Gonville and Caius College, Cambridge, graduating in 1958 with a BA in Modern and Medieval Languages and French Philology. In 1959, he earned a Diploma of Education from the College of SS. Mark & John London, and in 1960 he received an MA from Cambridge University.

After teaching for two years at the Berlitz School in Düren, Germany, where he also served as director, and two years teaching languages at the Halifax Grammar School in Halifax, Nova Scotia. He was invited as a poet to the US in 1964 to attend the Iowa Writers Workshop at the University of Iowa. While attending the workshop, he embarked on a PHD course in Comparative Literature and completed a dissertation on Contemporary French Poetics in 1969. In his final year at the University of Iowa, he served as Instructor of the International Writers Workshop.

== Career ==
In 1969, Clothier was appointed Assistant Professor of Comparative Literature at the University of Southern California. In 1972, he co-designed an interdisciplinary course of study, the Semester of the Arts, and served as Director of that program for the following three years.

Clothier resigned his professorship in literature and in 1976 accepted an appointment as Dean of Otis Art Institute of Los Angeles County (later the Otis College of Art and Design). He was appointed acting director in 1977 and oversaw the merger of the school with Parsons School of Design, The New School in New York. He left Otis in 1979 in order to accept a Rockefeller Fellowship for a study of the life and work of the pioneering African American artist Charles White. From 1983 to 1985, Clothier served as Dean of the College of Fine & Communication Arts at Loyola Marymount University. In 1985, Clothier left the university to work as a freelance writer and lecturer.

== Personal life ==
Clothier lives in Los Angeles, California with his wife Ellie Blankfort. He is the father of three children, Matthew, Jason, and Sarah, and the grandfather of four.

== Works ==
=== Fiction ===
- Chiaroscuro. St. Martin's Press. 1985. Signet Paperback. 1986.
- Dirty Down. Atheneum. 1994.
- The Pilgrim’s Staff. CreateSpace Independent Publishing. 2014.

=== Children's books ===
- The Carton of Bright Blue Paper Towels: A Kind of Cautionary Tale. CreateSpace Independent Publishing. 2016.

=== Nonfiction ===
- While I Am Not Afraid: Secrets of a Man’s Heart. High Mountain Press. 1997.
- The Real Bush Diaries: Second Term, First Year. 2006.
- Persist: In Praise of the Creative Spirit in a World Gone Mad with Commerce. Parami Press, Portland Oregon. 2010.
- Mind Work: Shedding Delusions on the Path to the Creative Core. Parami Press, Portland, Oregon. 2012.
- Slow Looking: The Art of Looking at Art. CreateSpace Independent Publishing. 2012.
- A Serious Conversation with Myself. CreateSpace Independent Publishing. 2018.

=== Monographs ===
- David Hockney (Modern Masters Series, Vol. 17). Abbeville Press. 1995.
- David Whaley. Friesens. 2016.

=== Poetry ===
- Aspley Guise. Red Hill Press. 1969.
- Parapoems. Horizon Press. 1972.
