= Frank Goodman =

Frank Goodman (5 May 1916 in New York City – 3 February 2006 in Manhattan) was an American Broadway theatre publicist.

== Career ==
Goodman began in theatre during the Great Depression, when he worked for the Federal Theater Project under the Works Projects Administration. From 1939, when he started his career, to 1961, Mr. Goodman represented more than 50 Broadway productions, including eight shows in 1960 alone. He also handled stars as varied as Jerome Robbins to Audrey Hepburn, and playwrights William Inge and Clifford Odets.

In his early days as a publicist, he worked with John Houseman and Orson Welles at the Mercury Theatre. He worked with Ethel Merman on Gypsy and Mary Martin on The Sound of Music. Goodman claimed the producer David Merrick once fired him from three shows at once for taking a rival's account.

He died of congestive heart failure in Manhattan. He was 89 years old.
