= Noel Diprose =

Australian cricketer

Personal information
- Full name: Noel Vertigan Diprose
- Born: 5 March 1922; Hobart, Tasmania, Australia
- Died: 26 February 2006 (aged 83); Hobart, Tasmania, Australia
- Batting: Right-handed
- Bowling: Right-arm medium-pace

Domestic team information
- Years: Team
- 1947–1957: Tasmania

Career statistics
Competition	First-class
Matches	15
Runs scored	187
Batting average	8.90
100s/50s	0/0
Top score	33 not out
Balls bowled	2987
Wickets	36
Bowling average	38.16
5 wickets in innings	2
10 wickets in match	0
Best bowling	7/83
Catches/stumpings	1/0
- Source: Cricinfo, 22 January 2017

Noel Diprose (5 March 1922 – 26 February 2006) was an Australian cricketer. He played fifteen first-class matches for Tasmania between 1947 and 1957. His best bowling figures were 7 for 83 against Victoria in 1950–51.

== See also ==
- List of Tasmanian representative cricketers
