= Barbara W. Leyden =

Barbara W. Leyden (18 December 1949 – 4 February 2006) was an American palynologist and paleoecologist.

Leyden earned her Ph.D. from Indiana University Bloomington in 1982. She conducted her research and taught at University of South Florida and frequently wrote about climate change in the late Pleistocene era in the Western Hemisphere.
