= Raymond Lesage =

French racewalker

Personal information
- Full name: Raymond Georges Lesage
- Nationality: French
- Born: 27 June 1917 Bonny-sur-Loire, France
- Died: 3 February 2006 (aged 88) Vatan, Indre, France

Sport
- Sport: Athletics
- Event: Racewalking

Raymond Georges Lesage (27 June 1917 – 3 February 2006) was a French racewalker. He competed in the men's 50 kilometres walk at the 1952 Summer Olympics.
