= John Belluso =

American playwright

- Born: November 13, 1969; Warwick, Rhode Island, U.S.
- Died: February 10, 2006 (aged 36); New York City, New York, U.S.
- Education: New York University (BA, MA)
- Occupations: Playwright, television writer, director

John Belluso (November 13, 1969 – February 10, 2006) was an American playwright best known for his works focusing on the lives of disabled people. He also directed a writing program for disabled people.

== Early life and education ==
Born in Warwick, Rhode Island, he began using a wheelchair at the age of 13 due to a bone disease, Camurati-Engelmann syndrome. He completed both Bachelors and Masters degrees at New York University's Tisch School of the Arts Dramatic Writing program.

== Career ==
In 2001, he wrote The Body of Bourne, based on the life of Randolph Bourne, a World War I pacifist and author. It was produced in Los Angeles by the Mark Taper Forum. He also directed the Forum's Other Voices program for writers with a disability. After that, he wrote Pyretown, which criticises America's managed care health system through a romance between a divorced mother and a young, wheelchair-using man.

Belluso joined the crew of the HBO western drama Deadwood as a writer for the first season in 2004, writing "The Trial of Jack McCall".

=== Selected work ===
- The Rules of Charity, in which the resentful caregiver adult daughter of a wheelchair user with cerebral palsy tries to rebel against the care-giving, and pursue her own desires, with variously disastrous consequences;
- Gretty Good Time, about a 32-year-old disabled woman living in a nursing home;
- Travelling Skin, about a waitress with cerebral palsy;
- Henry Flamethrowa, about a comatose woman who is believed to cause miracles; and
- A Nervous Smile, about the parents of a severely disabled child who consider abandoning her.

== Death ==
He died in February 2006 in New York City, where he was writing a play for New York's Public Theater about a disabled veteran returning from Iraq. In March 2008, the show was directed by his friend Lisa Peterson as an unfinished work in the Public's "Lab" series.

Season 1, episode 17, of Ghost Whisperer is dedicated to his memory.
