= Jaakko Honko =

Finnish economist (1922–2006)

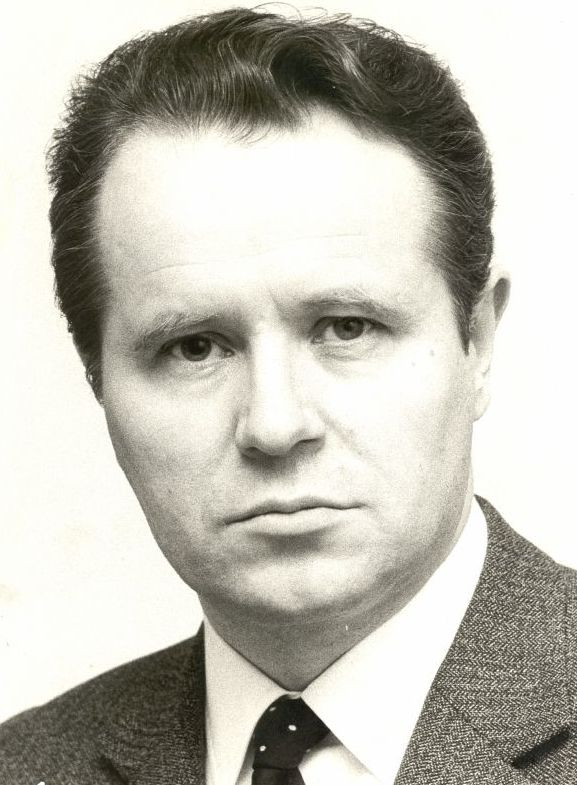

Jaakko Honko (November 30, 1922 – February 13, 2006) was a Finnish business economist, Professor at the Helsinki School of Economics, and its rector for many years.

Born in Tampere, Honko obtained MA in economics in 1946 at the Helsinki School of Economics, where in 1955 he also obtained his PhD with a thesis on investment problems and calculations. He was professor of business economics at the Helsinki School of Economics from 1960 to 1986, and its rector from 1980 to 1989. He was a visiting professor at universities in Sweden, Germany and the United States, and was affiliated with the Humboldt University after his retirement. He also held several positions in management for many years.

== Selected publications ==
- Honko, Jaakko. On investment decisions in finnish industry. Helsinki research Institute for business economics, 1966.
- Honko, J., Prihti, A., Virtanen, K. Critical areas in the capital investment process of enterprises : a study of the success and failure of strategy and capital investments in the 30 largest Finnish industrial enterprises. Helsinki, 1982.

Articles, a selection:

- Honko, Jaakko. "Das finnische Investitionsfonds-System." Weltwirtschaftliches Archiv (1962): 132–146.
- Honko, Jaakko. "Über einige Probleme bei der Ermittlung des Jahresgewinns der Unternehmung." Zeitschrift für Betriebswirtschaft 35.S 611 (1965).
- Honko, Jaakko. "The Challenges of the 1970s to Management." The Finnish Journal of Business Economics 2 (1970).
