= Claude Hubert =

French racewalker

Personal information
- Nationality: French
- Born: 16 March 1914
- Died: 12 December 1977 (aged 63)

Sport
- Sport: Athletics
- Event: Racewalking

Claude Hubert (16 March 1914 – 12 December 1977) was a French racewalker. He competed in the men's 50 kilometres walk at the 1948 Summer Olympics and the 1952 Summer Olympics.
