= John Ljunggren =

Swedish racewalker (1919–2000)

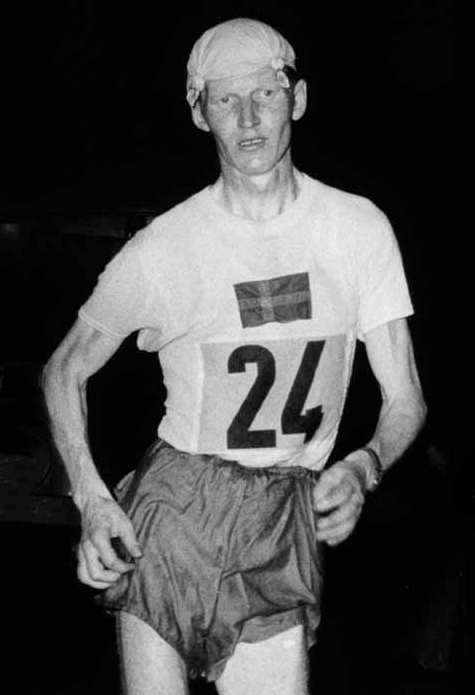
- Ljunggren racing at the 1960 Olympics

Personal information
- Full name: John Arthur Ljunggren
- Born: 9 September 1919 Forsheda, Sweden
- Died: 13 January 2000 (aged 80) Bor, Sweden
- Height: 1.78 m (5 ft 10 in)
- Weight: 59 kg (130 lb)

Sport
- Country: Sweden
- Sport: Athletics
- Event: Race walking
- Club: Värnamo GK

Achievements and titles
- Personal bests: 20 km – 1:31:19 (1956); 50 km – 4:19:40 (1956)
Medal record
Men's athletics
Representing Sweden
Olympic Games
Gold medal – first place	1948 London	50 km walk
Bronze medal – third place	1956 Melbourne	50 km walk
Silver medal – second place	1960 Rome	50 km walk
European Championships
Gold medal – first place	1946 Oslo	50 km walk
Silver medal – second place	1950 Brussels	50 km walk

John Arthur Ljunggren (9 September 1919 – 13 January 2000) was a Swedish race walker. He competed in the 50 kilometer event at the 1948, 1952, 1956, 1960 and 1964 Olympics and finished in first, ninth, third, second and 16th place, respectively. At the European Championships he won a gold medal in 1946, a silver medal in 1950, and finished fourth in 1954 and fifth in 1962.

Ljunggren got used to long walks as a child, along with his brothers Verner and Gunnar, as they did not have bicycles. He was known for his walking technique, and was never disqualified during his 499 races. He also competed nationally in cycling, orienteering, running and cross-country skiing. Ljunggren was used to hot, but not cold weather; so he got cramps in the cold Helsinki at the 1952 Olympics and finished ninth. At the 1960 Games in Rome, a friendly race official poured a bucket of ice water close to the finish; Ljunggren cramped again and finished second. At the 1956 Olympics he got a bad infection in a toe before the final race, yet managed to finish third.

Ljunggren continued race walking until 1984, and won the 20 km event at the 1977 World Championships in the masters category. An accountant by trade, he was deeply religious.
