= Harry Kristensen =

Danish racewalker

Personal information
- Nationality: Danish
- Born: 26 April 1915
- Died: 20 April 1982 (aged 66)

Sport
- Sport: Athletics
- Event: Racewalking

Harry Kristensen (26 April 1915 – 20 April 1982) was a Danish racewalker. He competed in the men's 50 kilometres walk at the 1952 Summer Olympics.
