= René Charrière =

Swiss racewalker

Personal information
- Nationality: Swiss
- Born: 30 July 1923
- Died: 21 March 1999 (aged 75)

Sport
- Sport: Athletics
- Event: Racewalking

René Charrière (30 July 1923 – 21 March 1999) was a Swiss racewalker. He competed in the men's 50 kilometres walk at the 1952 Summer Olympics and the 1960 Summer Olympics.
