= Dumitru Paraschivescu =

Romanian racewalker

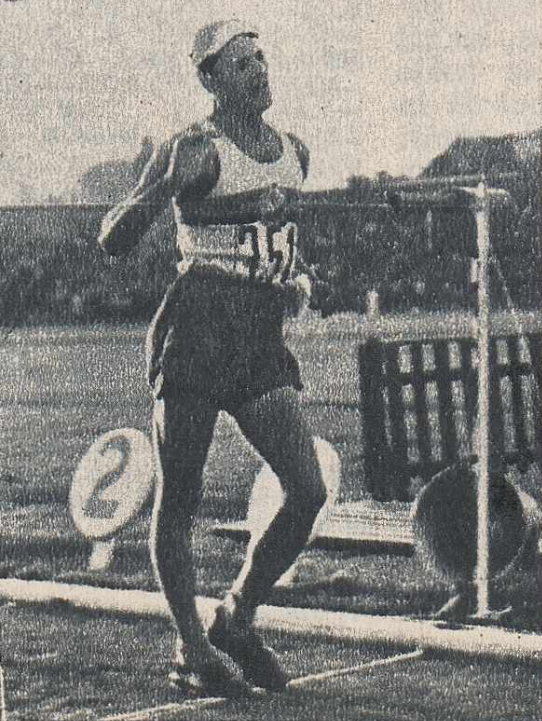

Personal information
- Nationality: Romanian
- Born: 18 April 1923 Bucharest, Kingdom of Romania
- Died: 22 February 2006 (aged 82) Nyon, Switzerland

Sport
- Sport: Athletics
- Event: Racewalking

Dumitru Paraschivescu (18 April 1923 – 22 February 2006) was a Romanian racewalker. He competed at the 1952 Summer Olympics and the 1956 Summer Olympics.
