= Vladimir Ukhov =

Russian racewalking athlete

Medal record

Men's athletics

Representing Soviet Union

European Championships
| Gold medal – first place | 1954 Bern | 50 km walk |

Vladimir Ukhov (21 January 1924 – 25 May 1996) was a Russian racewalking athlete who competed in the 1952 Summer Olympics. He was born in Saint Petersburg.
