= The Organization of Amputees UDAS Republike Srpske =

- Founded: 2002.05.23.
- Founder: Disabled military veterans and amputees
- Purpose: support programs for amputees and other people with disabilities
- Location(s): Sime Miljusa 2, Banja Luka, 78 000; Republika Srpska, Bosnia and Herzegovina
- Region served: Bosnia and Herzegovina
- Website: https://www.udas.rs.ba/

The Organization of Amputees Republike Srpske (UDAS) (Serbian: Организација Aмпутираца УДАС Републике Српске/Organizacija amputiraca "UDAS" Republike Srpske) is registered as a nonprofit organization and non-governmental organization based in Banja Luka, Bosnia and Herzegovina (BiH), founded by amputees which are mostly landmine victims in order to provides support for victims of landmines, unexploded ordnance (UXO), cluster munition and other persons with disabilities and their families to integrate them back into the community, thus enabling them to live normal lives.

== Overview ==
Organization of Amputees UDAS Republike Srpske is intended to protect and promote the rights of the disabled population regardless of the type and manner of acquiring disability. The UDAS provides assistance primarily to survivors and their families, as well as other people with disabilities with various types of projects and activities: peer support, referrals, social and economic inclusion activities, legal advising, survivors and disability rights campaigns, disability arts and disabled sports.

The UDAS maintains partnership with a number of local and regional organizations that support people with disabilities and organizations which are working on demining. In addition to that, UDAS has partnerships with the city of Banja Luka and Ministries on both levels: Republic of Srpska and Bosnia and Herzegovina. UDAS has participated and created various numbers of projects and activities supported by local, republic, and state governments, as well as USAID, the EU and the Norwegian Embassy in Sarajevo.

The organization covers the entire area of the Republic of Srpska through five regional associations in Banja Luka, Doboj, Bijeljina, Istocno Sarajevo and Trebinje. It has around 4500 members, mostly victims of the mines and cluster munitions in BiH. The leaders of the UDAS are the survivors themselves. UDAS is a member of the KOMA Coalition (coalition for marginalized groups) and the ICBL-CMC Coalition.

=== Brief history ===
In the aftermath of the Yugoslav wars, the disabled population in Bosnia and Herzegovina found themselves seriously disadvantaged. People with disabilities with serious lack of governmental support faced poverty and social exclusion, unequal access to health services, prejudice and discrimination.

In order to meet the basic needs of amputees (civilian and military) and other people with disabilities, UDAS was founded in 2002, mostly by landmine victims. In the beginning, UDAS received a lot of educational support from the former local non-governmental organization Landmine Survivors Initiatives (LSI). The organization began as the Association of Amputees UDAS Srpske but later became the Organization of Amputees UDAS of Republic of Srpska. In 2006 due to gained achievements and support given to persons with disabilities, the government of the Republic of Srpska declared UDAS an organisation of public interest.

== Land mine situation ==
During the 1992–1995 Bosnian war, an estimated two million landmines were planted. The majority of the locations of the landmines were not thoroughly mapped out and documented. This lack of documentation has complicated the demining process. Additionally, Bosnia's mountainous and densely forested territory pose a major impediment to the demining process, as the best mechanical methods for demining only work on flat land. Thus, the demining process has largely been done by hand, an assuredly slow and laborious undertaking. As a result, Bosnia and Herzegovina is still one of the most mine-contaminated countries in Southeastern Europe. The current size of the mine-suspected area in BiH covers 1,165 km^{2} (450 sq mi) or 2.3% of the total country size, with 1,417 affected communities, directly impacting the safety of about 538,500 people, or about 15% of the total country population. The cluster munition suspect area is 8.76 km^{2} (3.38 sq mi). An estimated 120,000 mines remain, according to the Bosnia and Herzegovina Mine Action Centre (BHMAC). For the period 1992–2013, BHMAC recorded a total of 8,319 mine/UXO casualties: 1,833 killed, 6,039 survivors, and 447 unknown. In many cases, one or more limbs had to be amputated. The number keeps growing every year. Ten people were involved in land mine accidents in January 2014 alone, including a ten-year-old boy who died in an explosion.

In May 2014, BiH was severely affected by the worst Balkan flood in over a century. Almost one third of Bosnia is affected by floods, with houses, roads and railway lines being submerged in the northeastern part of the country. One million people – approximately a quarter of the population – have been affected by the floods. Around 70 percent of the flood-affected zones were in areas contaminated by mines. Bosnian authorities reported that the floods had moved mines, cluster munitions, and unexploded ordnance (UXO), and had damaged minefield fencing and signs. At an ammunition depot in Orašje, some 250 tons of ammunition were reported as being underwater on 25 May 2014. Landmine Survivors Initiatives reported that more than 3,000 mine survivors were living in the flood-affected region.

== Inclusion ==
The UDAS is constantly working to improve the quality of life of persons with disabilities. UDAS actively organizes and participate in a range of innovative projects and activities together with organizations that focus on inclusion for people with disabilities. These activity projects cover community life, healthcare, employment, legislation, art and healthy lifestyle.

=== Health and social welfare ===
In cooperation with the Dr Miroslav Zotović Institute for Physical Medicine and Rehabilitation, UDAS provides an individual and peer group to support people with disabilities, organizes educational seminars on the topic of healthcare and social welfare, and psychological counseling for disabled war veterans, amputees and mine victims. All activities are led by professional associates, doctors and specialists. Also, in cooperation with Family Medicine Service, UDAS offers referrals for CBR centers.

=== Financial inclusion ===
Landmine contamination in BiH has a significant impact on its economy, in particular, the tourism industry, hunting and fishing, agriculture, and animal husbandry, as well as the safe use of natural resources. As a result of the poor post-war economy, persons with disabilities on average as a group experience worse socioeconomic situations, while simultaneously facing unemployment and prejudice especially regarding employment. People with disabilities in BiH live below the poverty threshold. As a result, persons with disabilities are usually perceived as charity cases.

In order to fight poverty, the main economic strategy of UDAS is to increase the income of persons with disabilities, through improvement of employment and self-employment opportunities. To do so, UDAS, in cooperation with relevant foundations and/or institutions, provides support in the informal employment sector to people with disabilities to start up or expand small businesses (primarily in livestock and agriculture), which will be run by themselves or their families. Besides that, UDAS organises various educational and business seminars, workshops, and consulting.

=== Legislation and public advocacy ===
When it comes to various sectors of public policy, disability is an often misunderstood and stigmatized condition. For that reason, UDAS's leadership takes particular interest in implementation of advocacy, social policies and legislation for persons with disabilities.

As a disability-rights organisation, UDAS in cooperation with Ministries and Services has worked on the drafting, improvement, practical implementation and adjustment of existing laws and regulations with the Convention on the Rights of Persons with Disabilities. The outcome of the combined actions was in the creation of the Soldiers' Rights Act, Pension and Disability Insurance Act and Social Protection Act. UDAS has mounted activities to educate individuals with disabilities on their new rights as well.

UDAS offers persons with disability legal support in terms of legal counseling, references and writing acts to relevant institutions.

=== Culture ===
Through cultural activities, primarily through disability arts, UDAS wants to create a network of local and regional artists to highlight the barriers faced by persons with disabilities and promote the creative potential of artists on the local, regional, and national levels.

UDAS organizes various cultural and creative projects and activities for persons with and without disabilities, such as drawing school and painting for children, creative writing workshops, graphic workshops, art colonies, and individual and collective exhibitions of artwork, where priority is given to persons with disabilities. All activities have a clear psychotherapeutic aspect. The main cultural activity is art and handcrafts.

The organization operates the Udas Art Gallery, a unique gallery in Southeast Europe because it provides an opportunity for young students of the Academy of Fine Arts, aspiring artists and artists with and without disabilities, to showcase their artwork free of charge. Besides the gallery, UDAS owns a graphic workshop. The Udas Art Gallery is the only place in Bosnia and Herzegovina where persons with disability have the opportunity to showcase their artwork. Within the gallery, UDAS shows documentaries and movies that are associated directly or indirectly with the present time and situation in society, free of charge. The screenings are led by dramaturges, who after the presentations discuss and analyze the movies' themes with participants.

=== Sport ===
Since a healthful lifestyle is one of the most important segments of rehabilitation, the UDAS encourages and supports persons with disabilities (primarily amputees) in participation in sporting activities, as well as developing confidence, independence and general health. In keeping with that, UDAS financially supports the Borac Banja Luka Shooting Club of amputees through projects, and individuals through one-off aid, so amputees can participate in disabled sports. UDAS also regularly organizes sporting events in chess, badminton and table tennis. All sporting events are led by persons who are trained to work with disabled people.
