= National Theatre Workshop of the Handicapped =

National Theatre Workshop of the Handicapped (NTWH) was a New York City-based repertory theatre company and theatre school, providing training and performing space for writers and performers with disabilities, founded in 1977 by Father Rick Curry, S.J. NTWH had programs for acting, singing, voice, writing, and theatre production, and thousands of theatre students and performers with disabilities participated in the company's programs in New York City as well as a campus in Belfast, Maine.

== History ==
Father Rick Curry's interest in performing became a major activity during his years in university. He gained experience in theatre and television commercial work. His university graduate studies were in theatre arts, which led to a PhD in the field from New York University.

Curry, born without a right hand and forearm, had his first experience with open discrimination against his disability allegedly when he tried to audition for a role in a mouthwash commercial, and the receptionist burst out laughing, assuming he had been sent in as a joke. Months later, he founded NTWH in 1977 in Lower Manhattan.

The company's goals included training students in communication skills that would help them in professional theatre, and to "enhance their opportunities in the workplace". Theatre schools commonly overlooked or excluded students who have a disability; so NTWH helped address this problem, offering courses in academic subjects and also practical theatre skills. NTWH aimed to "create a theatrical arena in which disabled and able-bodied actors and playwrights collaborate, train, and perform together". Community events were also held to stage dramatic works dealing with "themes of disability".

Curry brought a new focus to projects involving disabled veterans. The Writers' Program for Wounded Warriors provided a forum for veterans to write dramatic monologues about their war experiences.

Curry was a member of the Roman Catholic Jesuit order for more than 50 years, first as a Jesuit Brother, and more recently, as a priest and Chaplain at Georgetown University. Curry maintained that his theatre values reflected his Jesuit training:

Eloquentia perfecta, the perfection of eloquence, is the end result of Jesuit education," Curry said. "The student can stand on his or her own two feet and defend what he or she believes. This is what I wanted to do for the disabled, who have been ignored for so long. People never asked them what they thought or how they felt, so once you have empowered a disabled person artistically, you have in fact empowered a disabled person."

=== Maine projects ===
NTWH expanded its scope in 1996, launching a campus in Belfast, Maine, as a seasonal adjunct, and purchasing a local school from the city. A variety of projects were run through NTWH's Belfast campus, such as a theatre workshop, a fine arts gallery, a baking school, and a bakery in Belfast, all managed by people with disabilities. The Maine facility was also residential and fully accessible. NTWH's Belfast projects additionally included Summer theatre camps for children, both with and without disabilities.

=== Decline ===
Beginning in 2004, NTWH began having several financial problems which caused it to go into arrears on mortgage payments both with its New York studio and Belfast campus. This nearly culminated in a foreclosure auction in 2005, though NTWH was able to temporarily satisfy its debts by selling auxiliary buildings in Belfast. Later years, however, were more difficult for NTWH, and in 2010 the City of Belfast temporarily seized the Maine campus for non-payment of a sewer bill. Belfast City Manager Joe Slocum toured the building in January 2011 and found it abandoned and neglected. In January 2017, a local Belfast resident purchased the building with plans to renovate it for multi-functional use.

NTWH's New York ensemble gave a final performance on August 25, 2008, in Sag Harbour, New York, before suspending its operations. NTWH's final production was titled In Honour of Service, a performance of monologues written by participants in the NTWH Writer's Program for Wounded Warriors. Some of the former members of NTWH Cabaret, a project of the larger NTWH, continue performing in New York City as of 2011, and they have reformed in a new performing organization called Encompassing Voices.

Rick Curry died on December 19, 2015, in Philadelphia, PA after a long, undisclosed illness.

== See also ==
- Disability in the arts
- Disability art
- Expressive therapy
- Repertory theatre
