= EyeHarp =

Electronic musical instrument

The EyeHarp is an electronic musical instrument controlled by the player's eye or head movements. It combines eye tracking hardware and specially designed software, which has one component for defining chords and arpeggios, and another to change those definitions and play melodies. People with severely impaired motor function can use this instrument to play music or as an aid to learning or composition.

== History ==
The idea for the EyeHarp was born in 2010 when a friend of musician and computer scientist Zacharias Vamvakousis was involved in a serious motorcycle accident which left him quadriplegic. Vamvakousis noticed a distinct lack of accessible musical instruments for people with disabilities, so he began designing the EyeHarp to create opportunities for people with physical disabilities to make music. The development of the EyeHarp started in 2011 in Barcelona under the auspices of Pompeu Fabra University.

In 2019, Vamvakousis founded the EyeHarp association, a non-profit organisation which works to give people with disabilities access to cheap musical education and assistive technology.

== See also ==
Disability in the arts
