= Disability in the arts =

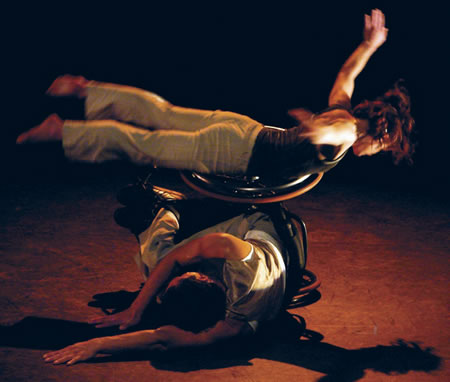
AXIS Dance Company members Sonsherée Giles and Rodney Bell perform a dance piece by Joe Goode in 2008.

Disability in the arts is an aspect within various arts disciplines of inclusive practices involving disability. It manifests itself in the output and mission of some stage and modern dance performing-arts companies, and as the subject matter of individual works of art, such as the work of specific painters and those who draw.

Disability in the arts is distinguished from disability art in that it refers to art that includes people with disabilities, whether in themes, performance, or the creation of the artwork, rather than works focusing on disability as the central theme. Disability in the arts can also refer to work that is made as a political act toward shaping a new community, fostering disability culture:

Disability culture is the difference between being alone, isolated, and individuated with a physical, cognitive, emotional or sensory difference that in our society invites discrimination and reinforces that isolation – the difference between all that and being in community. Naming oneself part of a larger group, a social movement or a subject position in modernity can help to focus energy, and to understand that solidarity can be found – precariously, in improvisation, always on the verge of collapse.

— Petra Kuppers

People with disabilities sometimes participate in artistic activities as part of expressive therapy (also known as "expressive arts therapy" or "creative arts therapy"). Expressive therapy may take the form of writing therapy, music therapy, drama therapy, or another artistic method. While creativity and artistic expression are parts of expressive therapy, they are secondary to the goal of achieving a therapeutic benefit. This article describes disability in the arts where artistic achievement is the primary goal.

== Performing arts ==
=== Dance ===
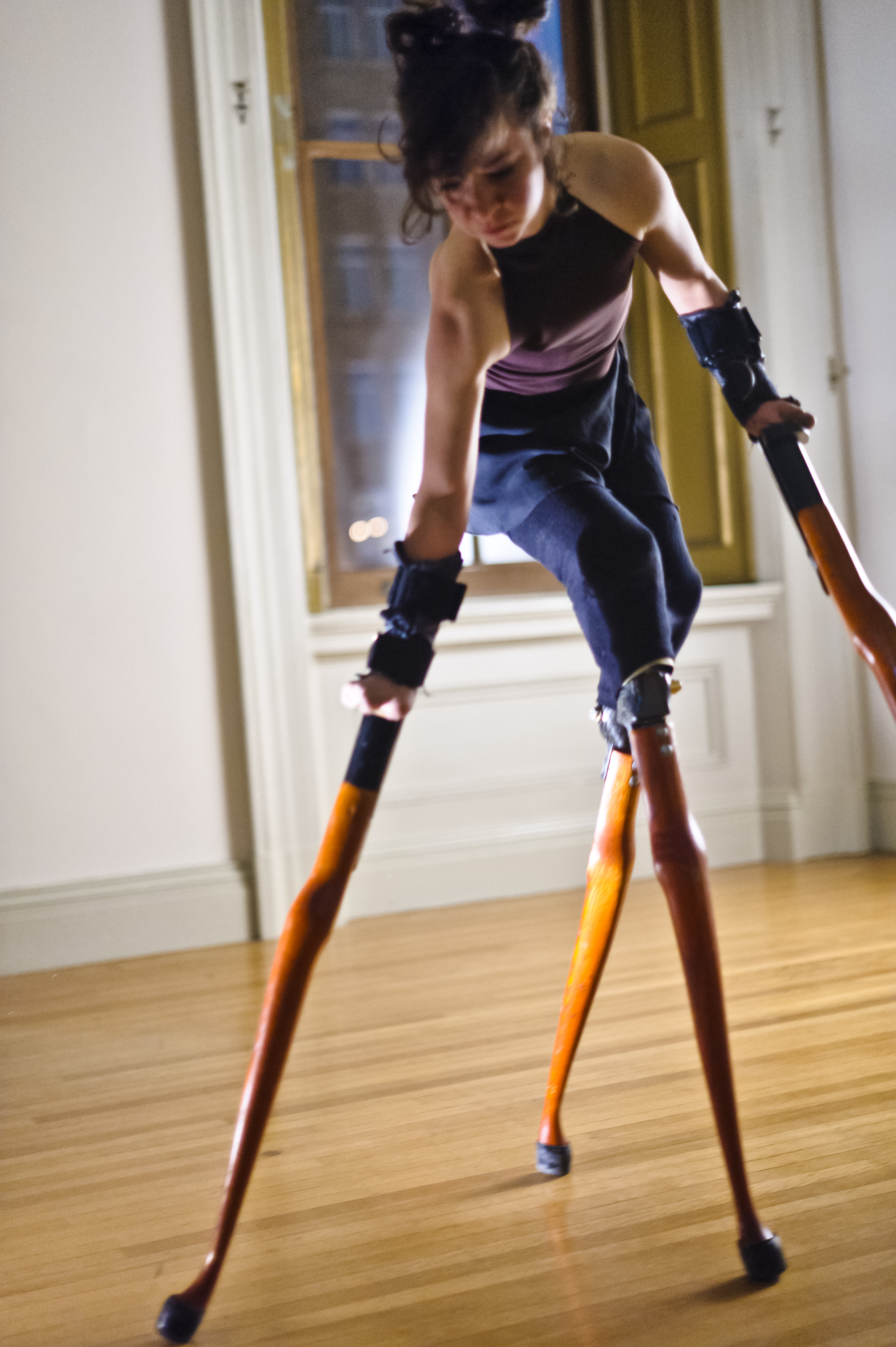
Lisa Bufano performing on her signature orange Queen Anne table legs

The physically integrated dance movement is part of the disability culture movement, which recognizes the first-person experience of disability. This means disability is integrated not as a medical model construct but as a social phenomenon, through artistic, literary, and other creative means.

=== Music ===
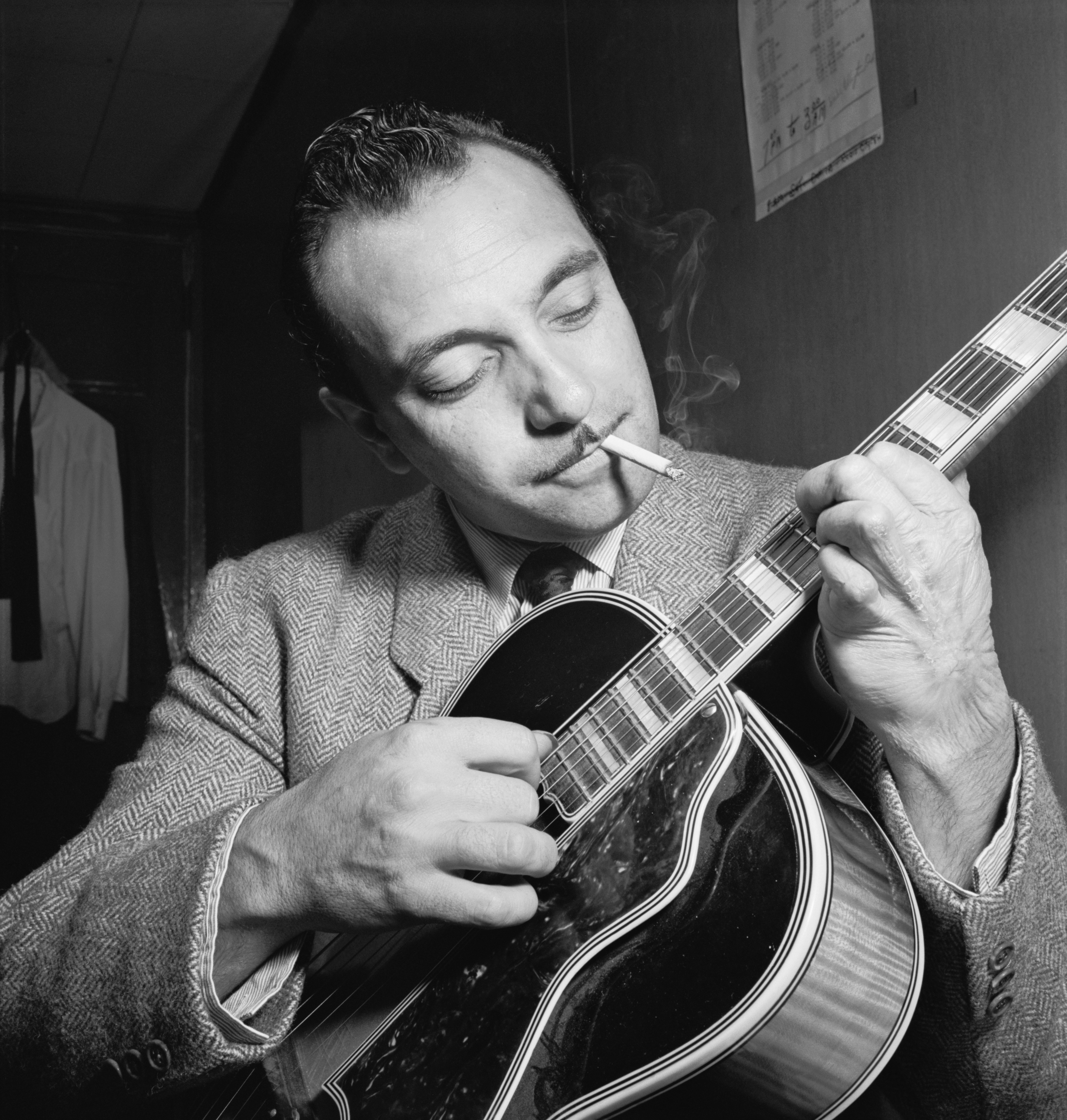
Jazz guitarist and composer Django Reinhardt became a top-selling recording artist. He developed new guitar techniques used by many guitarists today.

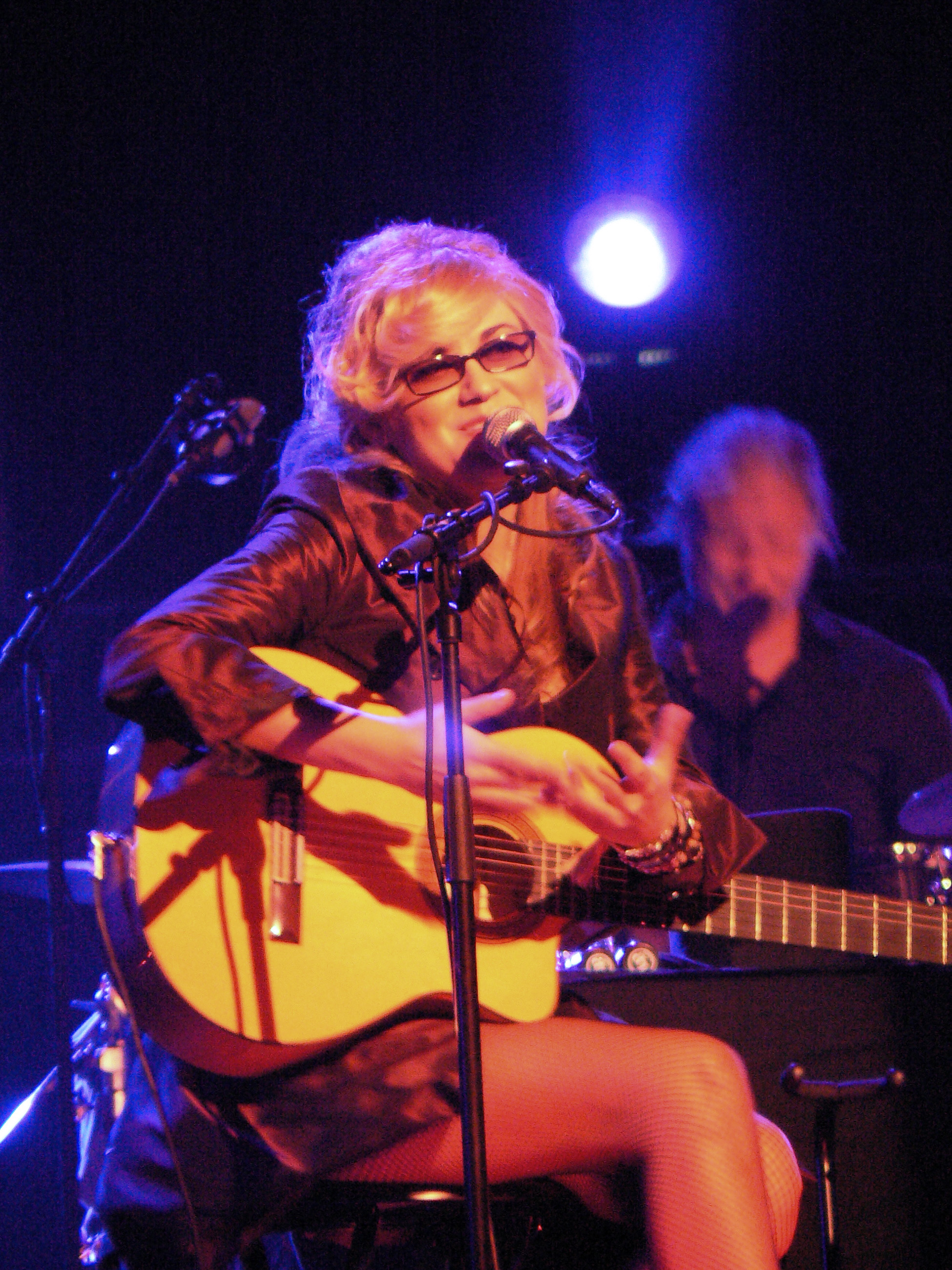
Singer Melody Gardot used music as therapy to improve her memory while recovering from a traumatic brain injury. She later became a top-selling jazz vocalist, and now tours internationally.

The Italian organist and composer Francesco Landini (c. 1325—1397) was the central figure of the Trecento style in late medieval music, his blindness makes him among the earliest figures in the history of disability in the arts.

Beethoven is remembered for his ability to compose classic music after completely losing his hearing. He tried several ways of using his deteriorating hearing before it completely disappeared. He had the legs of his pianoforte cut off, so that it was sitting directly on the floor. By lying on the floor in front of the keyboard, he could feel vibrations while he played, helping him to compose. Different attempts were made to help Beethoven with adaptive or assistive technology. Thomas Broadwood, the Streichers, and Conrad Graf were all piano manufacturers who tried different methods of adapting the instrument to make it louder for Beethoven: ear trumpets were attached to the soundboard, resonance plates were added to the underside of a piano, and using four strings for every key were all tried. Beethoven ultimately lost all hearing, and could no longer rely on an instrument to help him compose. Beethoven composed his Ninth Symphony at this time in his life.

Belgian jazz guitarist Django Reinhardt was a 20-year-old, accomplished guitarist when his left hand was severely burned in a house fire, leaving him with only the use of two fingers for playing the fretboard on the neck of the guitar. While he recovered from his burns, his brother gave him a new guitar. Reinhardt devised his own physical therapy, practising daily to stretch his fingers. He also invented new techniques to compensate for the lost fingers:

Instead of playing scales and arpeggios horizontally across the fretboard as was the norm, he searched out fingerings that ran vertically up and down the frets as they were easier to play with just two fingers. He created new chord forms using a minimum of notes—often just triads with his two good fingers on the bass strings. He pushed his paralyzed fingers to grip the guitar as well, his smallest digit on the high E string, his ring finger on the B, and sometimes barring his index finger to fashion chords of four to five notes. He then slid his hand up and down the fretboard, employing these chord forms to craft a fluent vocabulary.

Reinhardt continued to work as a guitarist, and became world-famous as a recording artist. Reinhardt's creative techniques became part of the jazz guitar repertoire.

Melody Gardot, a jazz vocalist, sustained a traumatic brain injury after she was hit by a car while riding a bicycle. Gardot's injury impaired her memory, including her ability to speak. She spent a year recovering in hospital. While in hospital, her therapy required her to relearn the process of completing simple tasks, such as remembering to shut off a water tap after brushing her teeth. Remembering words to complete sentences was a challenge for Gardot. A doctor suggested that Gardot try singing sentences as an alternative to speaking them, as a way of improving her ability to remember longer sentences. Gardot discovered that this method improved her memory. Gardot gained a music following by adding recordings of her music to Myspace in 2006. Gardot is now a world-famous recording artist, in both French and English, and gives concerts around the globe. She sometimes still has memory lapses while performing, and Gardot needs to wear sunglasses to protect her light-sensitive eyes. She carries a cane as she occasionally experiences vertigo.

In 2011, British composer Charles Hazlewood formed the British Paraorchestra, an orchestra that aims to consist entirely of skilled disabled musicians to counter his belief that orchestras do not contain enough disabled musicians. The formation of the orchestra was the subject of a Channel 4 documentary, and it also performed during the closing ceremony of the 2012 Summer Paralympics in London.

In the UK the One Handed Musical Instrument Trust has the objective of removing the barriers to music-making faced by physically disabled people. It comments: "There is currently no orchestral instrument that can be played without two fully functioning hands and arms, denying unlimited participation in musical life to those with congenital disabilities and amputees, as well as the millions who may have been injured, had a stroke or developed arthritis. The primary obstacle is the absence of suitable instruments."

The EyeHarp and the Clarion are examples of electronic musical instruments controlled by the player's eye or head movements. People with severely impaired motor function can use these instruments to play music or as an aid to learning or composition.

=== Theatre ===
In modern times, the treatment of disability in theatre works has reflected an evolution in mainstream social attitudes towards disability. In Western culture, disability was once rarely mentioned in plays. Notable exceptions include Shakespeare's Richard III. The character of Richard III was depicted as "deformed, unfinish'd" has served as an example of an "anti-hero" and illustrated the depiction of people with disabilities in the arts as villains. Richard's physical disabilities are used to symbolize the fundamental weakness in his character. Yet Shakespeare was conscious of the common mistake of equating physical beauty with personal or moral qualities, or the reverse perception, that physical unattractiveness represents personal flaws (he satirizes such attitudes in his Sonnet 130). Richard III is portrayed as a complex character, one whose tragedy is in surrendering to his moral weaknesses rather than overcoming them.

The inclusion of performers with disabilities in theatre has developed in tandem with wider public acceptance of integrating people with disabilities in mainstream society. French theatre actress Sarah Bernhardt was already famous when she had a leg amputation at age 71. She continued her acting career. Bernhardt disliked her prosthetic limbs and chose to use a sedan chair.

The National Theatre Workshop of the Handicapped (NTWH) was a repertory theatre company based in New York City that worked in advocacy, training, and production in theatre for performers with disabilities. It was primarily inclusive of performers and playwrights with physical disabilities when it was founded in 1977. NTWH oversaw projects such as the Writers' Program for Wounded Warriors, which served as both a therapeutic and artistic program for war veterans to explore the psychological, emotional and spiritual experiences of war. Famous People Players, founded in 1974, is a touring black light theatre company based in Toronto, Canada that employs people with disabilities as performers and staff.

Some notable 20th-century plays have dealt directly with disability. American playwright Tennessee Williams wrote many plays with female leads who were at least in part inspired by his sister Rose, who was diagnosed with schizophrenia, and then left severely disabled by a lobotomy as a young woman. Characters who reflect Rose's struggle with mental illness include Laura in The Glass Menagerie, Blanche DuBois in A Streetcar Named Desire, and Catherine in the screenplay Williams wrote for the 1959 film Suddenly, Last Summer. In Williams' plays, such women are seen as suffering tragedy as a result of their illness.

Leonard Gershe's Butterflies Are Free, about a young blind man who wins his independence from an overprotective mother, debuted on Broadway in 1969, was made into a film in 1972. The main character was played by non-blind actors in both the original run of the play and the film version. In contrast, the play Children of a Lesser God, written by Mark Medoff and debuting in 1980, included a deaf actress playing the female lead role of a character who is deaf. This continued in the 1986 film version; Marlee Matlin, who is deaf, won an Academy Award for Best Actress. In addition, the musical Spring Awakening (based on the 1891 German play), a production by Deaf West that debuted in 2015 on Broadway, featured a large cast of Deaf actors. The play featured both hearing and Deaf actors that performed using American Sign Language. In 2019, Ali Stroker became the first wheelchair-using actor to win the Tony Award for Best Featured Actress in a Musical for her performance of Ado Annie in the revival of Oklahoma!.

In Canada, one of the earliest plays by and about people with disabilities is David Freeman's Creeps, originally published by the University of Toronto Press in 1971, and it is this work that “broke new ground by bringing to life stories about people with disabilities." Freeman was born with cerebral palsy, and by the age of seventeen, he found himself sanding blocks in Toronto's Adult Interfraternity Workshop for a meagre seventy-five cents every two weeks; a deadening experience he wrote about for Maclean’s Magazine in 1964. Freeman penned a screenplay for CBC-TV based on the same subject matter, but it was passed over (the characters were deemed “too unattractive for television).” In the early 1970s, in his search for new Canadian work, Bill Glassco suggested Freeman rewrite the work as a play, a process Freeman found “painful” because he “lived it.” The result was Creeps, and it was a “major success” when presented by Factory Theatre Lab in February 1971. The play was then revised and remounted as the inaugural production of the newly established Tarragon Theatre in October 1971, and it was “an even bigger hit” than the premiere. That production won the first Chalmers Award for Outstanding Play in Toronto in 1972, and a Washington, DC showing in NYC garnered a New York Critics Drama Desk Award for Outstanding New Playwright in 1973. Since then, the play has been produced frequently in Canada, the US, and the UK.

Creeps involves five men with cerebral palsy who retreat to a men's washroom to avoid their mundane jobs, debate their lot in life, and rage against their ill treatment by society. Realism, black comedy, and grotesque characterization are interspersed with poignant fantasy scenes. Creeps depicts “a repressive system whose agents (flat characters […]) thwart the protagonists’ desire for freedom and fulfilment. But the real thematic focus [...] is the self-imprisonment, the self-condemnation and self-destruction of those who internalize the system's view of them and thus become incapable of freeing themselves from it.” As Freeman himself stated, “The play was about freedom and having the guts to reach for it.” While the play has many flaws, it is praised for its visceral (“like a punch in the mouth,” Douglas Watt wrote in the Daily News), gut-wrenching characterizations, and it is precisely this “power of three-dimensional humanity that made Creeps such a major dramatic achievement.” Fifty years later, as part of Stage Left's Step Right Up! Symposium, held online and in Victoria, BC in December 2023, Creeps was positioned as an important theatrical first and is understood as a harbinger of the disability arts movement in Canada.

During the last half century, a number of playwrights have created various kinds of works related to disability, ranging from teens dealing with mental illness, as with as Eufemia Fantetti's The Last Moon (1988), and Joan MacLeod's Toronto, Mississippi (Talonbooks, 1989), to children with physical ailments, as with Lina Chartrand's La P'tite Miss Easter Seals (premiered by Theatre Francais in 1988) and Shirley Barrie's TYA play, What If? (premiered by Straight Stitching Productions on tour in January 1995). There are quite a few plays that relate specifically to the experiences of parents who have children with disabilities. Examples in this vein include Emil Sher's Mourning Dove, about cerebral palsy and featuring a character with Down's Syndrome (first produced by CBC Radio in 1996), and his adaptation of The Boy in the Moon, a true story about parenting a child with a rare genetic disorder (premiered by the Great Canadian Theatre Company in September 2014 and chosen as the closing show for Crow's Theatre premiere season in May 2017.). Oftentimes, these plays are autobiographical, and there is a growing body of work about parenting children with disabilities such as autism, as with Saskatchewan playwright Kelley Jo Burke's Ducks on the Moon (Radiant Press, 2010), and its follow-up companion piece, Why Ducks, Anyway?, anthologized in 2016 by the League of Canadian Poets, or God’s Middle Name (Scirocco Drama, 2010) and Spelling 2-5-5 (premiered by Carousel Players in 2012) by Nova Scotian playwright Jennifer Overton. Coming out of Montreal, Christine Rodriguez likewise writes about autism in her works, Dreaming in Autism (2013, premiered at the Asper Centre for Theatre & Film), and The Autism Monologues (2018, premiered at the Montreal Fringe Festival)., while Michaela di Cesare also touches on the subject matter in Fear of Missing Out (premiered by Geordie Productions in 2019).

Theatre practitioners with disabilities have emerged in Canada as well. Some notable creators include Lyle Victor Albert, who has cerebral palsy (Scraping the Surface [1995], Objects in the Mirror [1997], Jumpin' Jack [2002]); blind playwright Alex Bulmer (Smudge [2000], May I Take Your Arm? [2018], Perpetual Archeology [2023]); Deaf playwrights Adam Pottle (Ultrasound) and Chris Dodd (Deafy), and award-winning black, disabled, trans, activist performer Syrus Marcus Ware (Antarctica).

Stage Left Productions in Alberta is one of Canada's longest running disability theatres, and it has produced a number of notable plays, including Alain Shain's solo shows, Still Waiting for that Special Bus (1999), and Time to Put My Socks On (2008). The latter was collaboratively written with Michele Decottignies and Nicole Dunbar, and it had a Bow Valley run in 2008, presentations in 2009, and a 2010 tour to Ottawa. JD Derbyshire’s one-person comedic show about living with bipolar disorder, Funny in the Head, was performed at Stage Left’s Balancing Acts Festival in 2008, and in 2010 at the Winter Paralympic Games in Vancouver, and the Dublin International Gay Theatre Festival. Poet, broadcaster, and new media artist Meg Torwl’s work, That’s So Gay! was commissioned and presented by Stage Left in 2009, and due to its success, in 2010, Stage Left presented another new play by Torwl, Cancer Town. There are many other shows to the company’s credit, but scholars have deemed Michele Decottignies’ collectively-created Mercy Killing or Murder: The Tracy Latimer Story, winner of the 2006 Moondance Columbine Playwriting Award, to be a “critically important” work. Drawing on documentary and verbatim theatre techniques, Mercy Killing or Murder unpacks the 1993 premeditated murder of Tracy Latimer and the sensationalist trial that followed after her father, Robert Latimer, killed her because she was in constant pain due to cerebral palsy. Presented in December 2003, the play emphasized the polarity of perspectives in the case between the general public and people with disabilities, as well as between “experts” and “ordinary people,” employing a trial-within-a-trial set-up in which the people/characters with disabilities, as well as the audience, function as jury. Given its articulation of “pressing human rights concerns for people with disabilities,” the efficacy of popular theatre tactics, and the innovations of disability aesthetics, Mercy Killing or Murder: The Tracy Latimer Story is considered an important and canonical work for disability theatre in Canada.

With organisations such as Disability Arts Alliance pushing an agenda for change, particularly in UK theatres, authenticity in casting where disabled fictional and historic figures are being re-claimed by casting with disabled actors, for example Duke of Gloucester/The King in Richard III has been played in professional productions by Peter Dinklage, Mat Frazer, Arthur Hughes, Daniel Monks, Tom Mothersdale, Kate Mulvany, Jan Potměšil, Katy Sullivan, Michael Patrick Thornton, Zak Ford-Williams and Michael Patrick. The Theatre and Disability movement is also focusing on incidental portrayal and there are more instances of casting disabled actors into roles that are not scripted as disabled, but where disability can act subtext. This is becoming more common in Shakespearean productions in companies such as Shakespeare's Globe and The Royal Shakespeare Company.

=== Theatre Companies ===
Notable disability theatre companies in Canada include the now defunct Kiss and Tell Collective (Vancouver), Inside Out Theatre (Calgary), Realwheels Theatre (Vancouver), Stage Left Productions (Canmore),Theatre Terrific (Vancouver), Workman Arts (Toronto), and renowned playwright, Judith Thompson's company, R.A.R.E., which was established to put disabled performers and marginalized communities in the spotlight.

==== The Apothetae ====
A theater in New York City created by Gregg Mozgala, a professional actor with spastic diplegia cerebral palsy. The name of the theater company comes from the play The Rules of Charity, where John Belluso referenced the apothetae, a chasm in Ancient Greece where infants, who were found by elders to be too small or disabled, were left to die from exposure. The term means "the place of exposure", and the theater company aims to expose the disabled experience though history. The Apothetae focuses on "The Disabled Experience" and integrates able bodied actors with actors who have mental and physical disabilities. Their first larger production was "The Penalty" which was based on a film from the 1920s.

==== Blue Apple Theatre ====
Blue Apple Theatre is a theatre company based in Winchester, England. It was founded in 2005 by Jane Jessop to pioneer the inclusion of actors with intellectual disabilities on mainstream stages. In May 2012, six Blue Apple actors made history by touring a ground-breaking re-imagining of William Shakespeare's Hamlet around the South of England. They were the first actors with Down syndrome to perform the play professionally. The title role was played by Tommy Jessop.

==== Graeae Theatre Company ====
Graeae Theatre Company is a British organisation composed of artists and managers with physical and sensory impairments. It was founded in 1980 by Nabil Shaban and Richard Tomlinson and named for the Graeae of Greek mythology. In 1981 the company was offered the use of an office, rehearsal space and facilities for 18 months by the West End Centre, an Arts Centre in Aldershot in Hampshire.

==== Nicu's Spoon Theater Company ====
Nicu's Spoon is an inclusion-oriented Off-Off-Broadway theater company in New York City.

==== Phamaly Theatre Company ====
Phamaly Theatre Company, (formerly the Physically Handicapped Actors & Musical Artists League), is a theater group and touring company formed in 1989 when a group of former students of the Boettcher School in Denver, Colorado, frustrated with the lack of theatrical opportunities for people with disabilities, decided to found a company of their own. Phamaly performs at the Denver Performing Arts Complex and the Aurora Fox Theatre. The company's season also includes various touring and educational shows.

==== Theater Breaking Through Barriers ====
Theater Breaking Through Barriers (TBTB – formerly Theater By The Blind) is an Off-Broadway, all-inclusive theater company in New York City dedicated to advancing the work of professional actors, writers and directors with disabilities. Founded by Ike Schambelan in 1979, TBTB began as a company of sighted actors hired to record plays for the blind. In 1982, the theater incorporated and began creating showcases, which mixed blind, low-vision and sighted performers. By 1985 the troupe began producing full stage productions featuring integrated casts of blind/low vision and sighted actors for blind and sighted audiences. In 2008, TBTB expanded their mission to include all performers with disabilities and officially changed their name from TBTB – Theater By The Blind to TBTB – Theater Breaking Through Barriers to reflect the expansion.

== Film ==
For filmmakers and audiences alike, there is an unspoken appeal for disabled people on screen. Films have an impact in shaping society's views of specific groups. For films with disability, these views and stereotypes are drawn from social institutions and norms in Western culture. Several influential pieces of writing that predate film which include disability:

- Moby-Dick, Captain Ahab's sole purpose is to take revenge on the whale that made him disabled.
- The Old Testament, disability as a punishment from God is found in several passages.
- Richard III by William Shakespeare, there is a character, Richard Crookback, whose disability and villainy are inseparable.

These examples point to a reoccurring theme of disability in mainstream culture and in film, it is pervasive and often overlooked. One theory movie goers continue to watch films with disability is explained psychologically. In Sigmund Freud's 1919 essay "Uncanny", he attributes the fear of disability as a substitute for castration anxiety and veering from the norm.

Film in disability typically involves the portrayal of one disability or another in a way that is meant to communicate a specific message or perspective. Many films strive to create a sense of inclusiveness and awareness, thereby eliminating the apparent social stigma associated with disability. Many films aim to trigger discussion and other forms of engagement revolving around disability.

Independent disability film is often screened on a larger scale during disability film festivals. ReelAbilities, for example, is an annual film festival in the United States screening films about disability issues, which acts to "[promote] appreciation and awareness of the lives, stories and artistic expressions of people with various disabilities." They additionally aim to "bring together our community to explore, discuss, embrace, and celebrate the diversity of our shared human experience."

Disability in film has been a relatively recent phenomenon; as Hollywood has "kept its distance, favouring conditions such as blindness, deafness and discreet mental illnesses which exhibit no outward sign of deformity, though good-looking wheelchair users have proved acceptable." According to scholar David T. Mitchell, it was nearly thirty years ago that "a resurgence of concern over the consequences of dehumanizing representations (monster, freak, madman, suffering innocent, hysteric, beggar) resulted in suspicion over the ultimate utility of representational studies about disability." Mitchell further discusses the shift to altering the social perception of various disabilities in the public sphere.

Disability has been portrayed in film since the era of silent cinema. Disability may be an essential plot element or make a significant contribution in another way as part of the screenplay. The experiences of disabled war veterans were often the basis of early films that dealt with disability. The Light That Failed, a popular short story by British author Rudyard Kipling, was filmed in 1916, 1923 and 1939. The protagonist, a veteran gradually losing his eyesight, became in many ways a template for many films that would portray disabled veterans as tragic victims. Films in this pattern include The Men (1950), starring Marlon Brando, and Johnny Got His Gun (1971), an anti-war film directed by Dalton Trumbo. Other early films established the pattern of portraying disabled soldiers as "noble warriors", confronting and overcoming both physical disability and society's lack of understanding upon their return home. Some examples include Thirty Seconds Over Tokyo (1944), Since You Went Away (1944), and the groundbreaking The Best Years of Our Lives (1945). The Best Years of Our Lives tells the story of several veterans who are disabled in battle, then return home to face their own bitterness and the challenge of reintegrating into society as men with a disability. Some members of the film industry opposed the decision to cast Harold Russell, a real-life veteran who lost both hands in a training accident, stating that it was in "poor taste". However, the film was popular with audiences, and Russell was awarded the Academy Award for Best Supporting Actor, as well as "a special Oscar for 'Bringing hope and courage to his fellow veterans'".

Early portrayals of women with disabilities rarely strayed from an image of an innocent, sheltered young woman. Even a nuanced film like Charlie Chaplin's City Lights (1931) follows this pattern. This film tells the story of the Little Tramp's efforts to help a blind flower girl with whom he falls in love. The film was radical in challenging the audience at the end of the film to take the point of view of someone blind, to metaphorically "see" beyond their prejudices towards others. The melodrama Johnny Belinda (1948), which depicts an innocent young deaf woman raped and then defending herself from an attempted murder, does little to give the lead character any depth beyond being a typical "plucky" and brave hero. Yet, the film was notable for bringing sign language to mainstream film audiences for the first time, and for making a woman with a disability the main character and allowing her to triumph over adversity. Children of a Lesser God (1986) shattered the stereotype of the innocent young woman with a disability. The character Sarah is independent, strong-willed, and often fails to recognize what is in her own best interests. Marlee Matlin won the Academy Award for Best Actress, and was an exception to the general rule that only non-disabled actors would appear in high-profile film roles depicting someone with a disability.

Disabled actors that are older, over 40 more specifically, are more likely to be chosen for roles in films, compared to their younger counterparts. This suggests that the perception of the disability in film becomes more acceptable as one gets older.

=== Plot ===
- Sur mes lèvres features a heroine who is introduced immediately with a shot of her putting her earpiece in. Carla (Emmanuelle Devos) is by no means weak-willed, but her partial deafness makes it more distressing to watch her cope with her job as an overworked and under-appreciated secretary. It is only when she faints from the exhaustion of picking up after her unpleasant coworkers that Carla accepts the boss's offer of an intern assistant. She rapidly falls in love with her new colleague, an ex-convict, and ends up colluding with him in an outlandish scheme.
- Rory O'Shea Was Here, about a young rebel man with muscular dystrophy who tries to help a fellow young man with cerebral palsy follow him in the arts of "getting drunk and getting laid". Rory dies at the film's end, but his mission has been accomplished: his friend with CP has successfully been taught self-determination, and carries on the legacy.
- One Flew Over the Cuckoo's Nest is a drama about the mistreatment of mental patients which was the second film to win all five main Academy Awards.
- The Cost of Living (2004), by DV8 Physical Theatre, which is a less coherent plotline and more a loosely gathered collection of scenes features dancer David Toole interacting with other dancers and having a close friendship with an able-bodied fellow artist.
- Helena Bonham Carter plays a woman with motor neurone disease in The Theory of Flight. The film deals with the sexuality of people with disabilities.
- The Australian film Dance Me to My Song, with similar themes to The Theory of Flight, was written by and stars Heather Rose, who herself has cerebral palsy.
- In Wait Until Dark (1967), a blind woman (Audrey Hepburn) must fight criminals who break into her home. Hepburn was nominated for an Academy Award for Best Actress.
- In Snow Cake (2006), Sigourney Weaver plays an autistic woman, and has said that she spent enormous amounts of time with a real-life autistic individual in order to totally immerse herself in this role.
- In The Horse Whisperer (1998), teenager Grace (Scarlett Johansson) loses her lower right leg in a riding accident which also leaves her horse traumatised. The film portrays the physical and mental recovery of both horse and rider after her mother (Kristin Scott Thomas) drives them from New York to Montana to meet "horse whisperer" Robert Redford.
- The 2010 Chinese film Ocean Heaven is about an autistic son.
- In Rust and Bone, Marion Cotillard plays Stéphanie, an orca trainer who loses her legs after an accident at the marine park she works. Stéphanie, now in a wheelchair, is terminally depressed and starts a relationship with Ali Matthias Schoenaerts, who brings her back to life.

=== Screenplay ===
In the 2009 science fiction film Avatar, the paraplegic protagonist (Sam Worthington) experiences a new freedom as a fully mobile human-alien hybrid (avatar).

Spencer Tracy plays a disabled war veteran in Bad Day at Black Rock. He steps off the train at the almost-deserted desert hamlet of Black Rock. It is the first time the train has stopped there in four years. The remaining inhabitants are unaccountably hostile, but Tracy proves that one good arm is all you need to win a fight.

=== Film by era ===
Disability in film can be categorized into three eras: silent film to the 1930s, 1940s to the 1970s, and post 1970s.

==== Silent films to the 1930s ====
One of the first disability films is Thomas Edison's Fake Beggar in 1898. This short film of fifty seconds, is about a fake beggar who poses as blind, but is eventually caught by the police. Early depictions of disabled people involved criminality and freak shows. In this era, scientist tried to rationalize and catalog people's abnormalities, for example Francis Bacon attempt in 1620 to Isidore Geoffroy Saint-Hillaire actualized catalog in the 1830s. In addition, Cesare Lombroso, a criminal anthropologist, drew a direct correlation between body and mind as a sign of degeneracy. This idea points to a common trope, one of the disabled criminal. Furthermore, these early films coincided with the accepted idea of eugenics at the time, leaning heavily towards the medical model of disability.

- The Cabinet of Dr. Caligari (1919) contains the trope of the insane hypnotist, Dr. Caligari, as a criminal and villain. The disabled insane criminal in this film also touches on another stereotype, that of the disabled person exacting revenge on the non-disabled world. This reaction assumes the nefarious character also has a loss of humanity. Also, the expressionist style of shooting, gives the viewer a distinct perspective of a mentally disabled person.
- Freaks (1932) is an exploitative film by definition. This is achieved through the use of real disabled and freak show actors in the film. Though director Tod Browning is able to show the humanity of the freaks through marriage, birth, community, and other aspects of being a human, the second half of the film reverts to a dehumanizing revenge scene. The abnormal bodies are a metaphor for a lack of emotional and spiritual capacity, that the latter part of the film displays. The freak show characters are also placed in the center framing of many shots, as spectacles.

==== 1940s to the 1970s ====
This era of disability films can be described as post-war films. The trope of the disabled alcoholic veteran in a wheelchair became passé. The WWII and the Vietnam War were publicly perceived and reacted to differently, therefore representations of disabled veterans from these respective wars were also different. Post-traumatic stress is a reoccurring theme in the 1970s, as action films that previously upheld American culture and values, no longer did as a result of the Vietnam War.

- The Men (1950) used paraplegic veterans of WWII. It documented the lives of returning veterans. This film is able to move past veterans "bound" by wheelchairs and to show another side of their lives. However, there are instances of characters in the film who speak about their disability in spite
- In The Conversation (1974), private surveillance expert Harry Caul realizes that one of his recording jobs will result in a murder. As a result, Harry refuses to hand over the recordings. This leads him into a spiral of helplessness, where Harry is no longer in control of his precious privacy. This exemplifies PTSD, as the protagonist is betrayed by authority and in a position of powerlessness.
- The Deer Hunter (1978) followed a group of returning veterans in varying conditions. However, the stereotype of the helpless disabled veteran is not evident in this film, though for much of the film the disabled character, Steven, is in a place of powerlessness. In the last scene, the group comes together singing "God Bless America" and toasting, representing his return to group society and away from the helpless disabled person.

==== Post 1970s ====
Contemporary films have attempted more nuanced and humanistic portrayals of disabled people. One particular movement, Dogme 95, attempted to change the standard narratives, aesthetics and productions of studio film.

Notable examples:

- Lars and the Real Girl (2007) is about a withdrawn young man who has a relationship with his sex doll, who uses a wheelchair. The townspeople are hesitant to accept Lars' companion, but eventually welcome her into the community. The doll, Bianca, represents a wheelchair-user/disabled person, who is accepted. Furthermore, Lars uses the doll for the community to accept his disability.
- Julien Donkey Boy (1999) Where director Harmony Korine attempts to film a character with untreated schizophrenia in a nuanced perspective. Following the Dogme 95 movement, it is shot in an unfiltered manner and anti-Hollywood style. In addition, there are scenes where disabled characters create artistic and creative performances, a divergence from disability tropes

=== Media companies ===
Some visual media companies have a particular focus on issues involving disability. Some examples follow.

- Digital Theatre Systems – Surround sound and DTS-CSS or Cinema Subtitling System, captioning for film theatres
- Narrative Television Network in Tulsa, Oklahoma, adds audio description (delivered by television broadcast, cable, satellite, and the Internet) to an existing soundtrack.
- Roaring Girl Productions is a professional media company based in Bristol, UK, which creates fresh representations of disability in its productions. Founded in 1999 by artist-activist Liz Crow, RGP's work tours internationally and has set new standards of good practice for the inclusion of disabled people in film production and as audiences.
- Audio Description Associates creates audio description services for theatre, media, and visual arts exhibitions.

== Visual arts ==
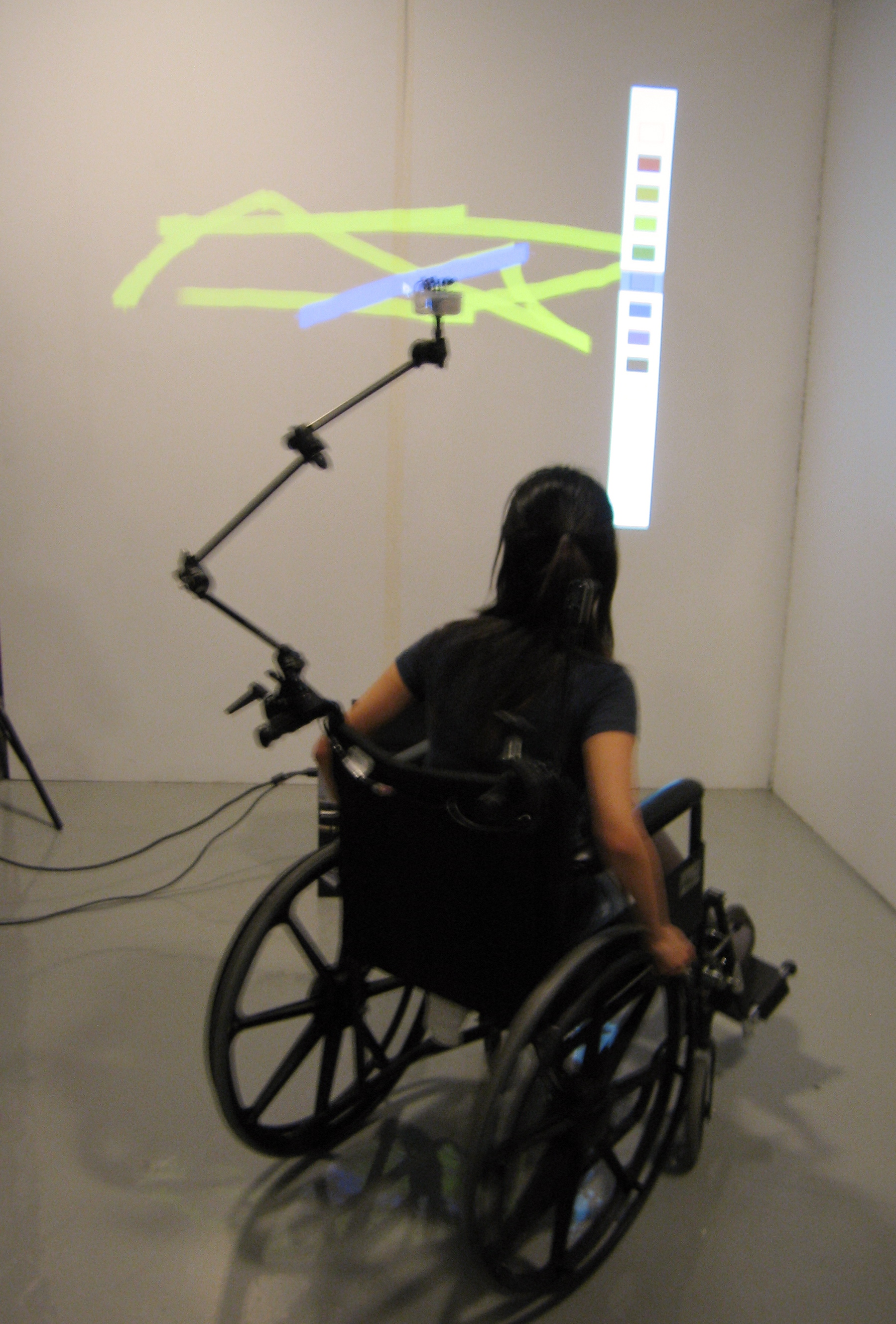
Digital drawing using a Wii Remote to overcome mobility restrictions

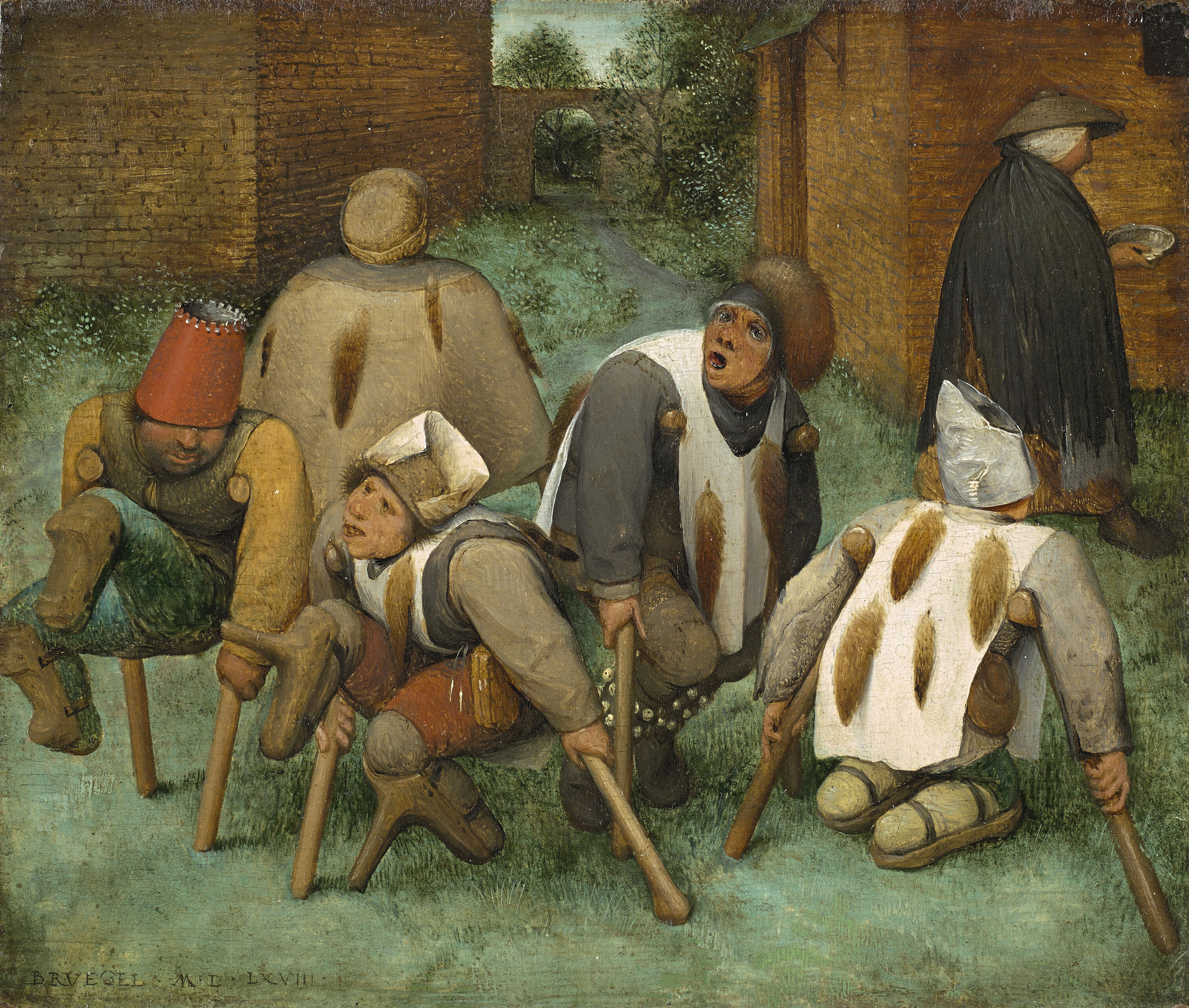
The Cripples (a.k.a. The Beggars) by Pieter Breugel the Elder (1568). A 16th-century artistic representation of disabled beggars.

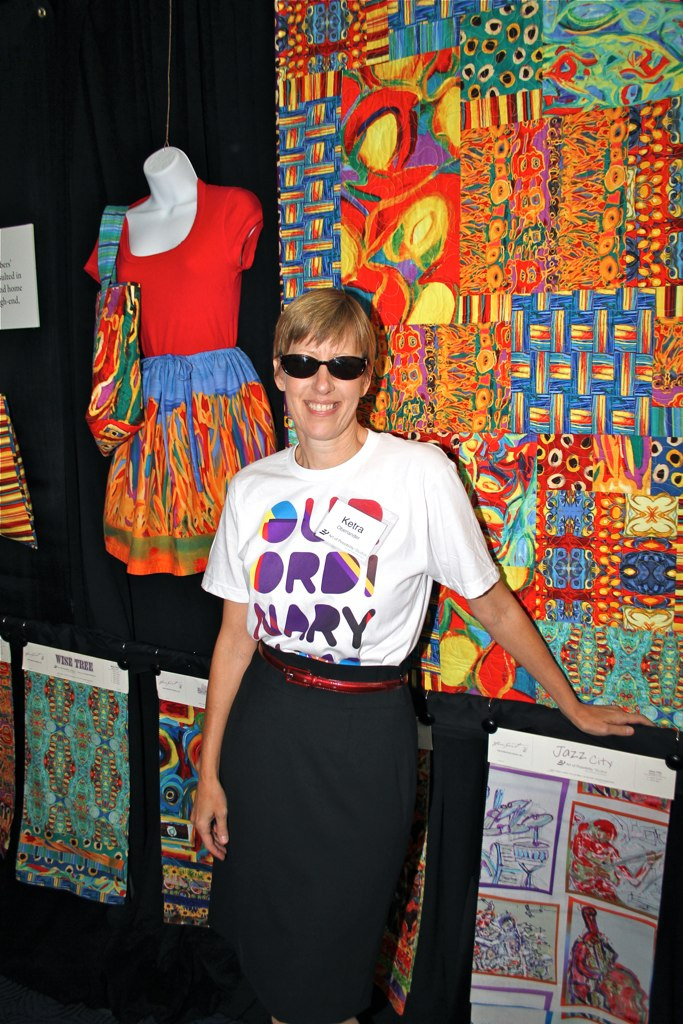
Ketra Oberlander is a visually impaired artist.

=== Disabled artists ===
Adaptive technology is helping an increasing number of artists overcome challenges that would otherwise prevent them from fully exercising their creativity. Mobility impairments can be overcome with tools such as Wii Remote, which allows users to create digital graphics and digital paintings. Computer technology can also help artists with restricted vision.

The creative use of adaptive or assistive technology in media can also provide ways for the visually impaired to enjoy visual arts. Audio devices are made available to visitors at some museums, galleries, and other cultural institutions, to provide an informative narration for visitors, whether or not they have a visual impairment. Audio narration for theatre, film or television provides necessary description, added between dialogue, for visually impaired audience members.

Conceptual art is also a way for disabled artists to engage in the arts, by using studio assistants to carry out the artist's creative vision. This is prevalent in current art practice, where several disabled artists have found success in this field.

A number of well-known visual artists have worked professionally despite the challenges of disability. Some include:

- Henri de Toulouse-Lautrec, who had restricted mobility in his legs, and became famous for his paintings of 19th-century French dancers.
- Frida Kahlo, a Mexican feminist and painter, wore a body brace due to multiple severe body injuries, which she depicted in self-portraits.
- Claude Monet, French Impressionist painter, gradually lost much of his vision from cataracts. His vision was left restricted to a mainly blue colour range, so he used a predominantly blue palette in his later works, such as Water Lilies.
- Vincent van Gogh, Dutch post-Impressionist painter, probably had bipolar disorder. Symptoms of hallucinations and psychosis that he experienced may have influenced some of his experiments with visual style in his paintings.
- Al Capp, American cartoonist (Li'l Abner), had a leg amputation at age nine, which was said to have influenced his sardonic humour.
- John Callahan, American cartoonist, began his career after becoming a quadriplegic in an accident at age 21.
- Chuck Close, American painter, paralyzed in 1988, a quadriplegic.
- Yinka Shonibare, MBE, British conceptual artist, diagnosed with transverse myelitis. Turner Prize nominee.
- Ryan Gander, British conceptual artist, a wheelchair user with a long term disability.
- Kathleen Morris, Canadian Impressionist painter, had cerebral palsy and became one of the most well known woman modernist painters.
- Ketra Oberlander gradually lost much of her vision, including much of her colour perception (cone of the eye) and black-and-white perception (rod of the eye). She is now legally blind, although she retains a restricted degree of vision. In mid-life, she changed careers, becoming a professional artist. Oberlander is able to use computers to create digital graphics, and also paints in acrylics. She founded an art licensing company that helps mobility-impaired artists distribute their work.
- Riva Lehrer, an American artist with spina bifida, draws and paints largely from life.
- Angela de la Cruz, London-based Spanish artist, paralysed following a stroke at the age of 40 and uses a wheelchair, Turner Prize nominee.
- Judith Scott, an American fiber sculptor with Down syndrome.
- Paul Darke, Wolverhampton-based artist, with spina bifida, who works in all digital forms.

== Literature ==
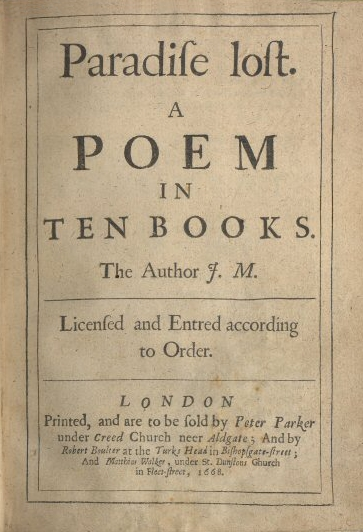
The title page of the first edition of Paradise Lost, 1668. John Milton, who was blind, composed the epic poem by dictating it to assistants who transcribed it for publication.

Oral literature, the oldest form of literature, can be enjoyed by anyone, including the deaf or hearing-impaired (depending upon their ability to lip-read), and impaired verbal ability is the only impediment to storytelling. Homer, the ancient Greek author of the verse epics the Odyssey and the Iliad, is believed to have been blind. This disability was no barrier to the challenge of composing, and reciting for others, his classic creations, which contain over 15,000 lines (Iliad) and 12,000 lines (Odyssey). The Iliad itself is divided into 24 "books" that each take around one hour to recite. The tradition of oral storytelling, and the greater ease with which verse stories are memorized and retold, helped John Milton compose the 17th-century epic English poem Paradise Lost. Milton gradually lost most of his eyesight and dictated Paradise Lost to willing assistants who wrote it down for publication (a process called Amanuensis).

The shift in modern Western culture away from oral storytelling to the written and printed word has created a barrier for the visually impaired. Writing and self-editing prose writing is often impossible without the use of assistive technology. Software developed for the visually impaired, called screen readers, enable users to hear a voice reading the user's choice of digital printed material, such as e-books or Websites. Braille keyboards enable users to type and edit using a computer. Assistive technology is also available to help users with a learning disability, such as dyslexia, that impairs literacy, to read and write more easily using computers.

Literature that includes disability as a theme has become more common in recent decades. In non-fiction, memoirs have raised mainstream awareness of the experiences of people with disabilities. Notable recent first-person accounts include My Left Foot, written by painter and writer Christy Brown. First published in 1954, it describes his upbringing in Ireland, his challenges brought on by severe cerebral palsy, and his early career. It was made into a popular film in 1989, for which Daniel Day-Lewis won an Academy Award for Best Actor. American writer Jim Knipfel took a humorous, irreverent approach with Slackjaw (1999), a memoir in which he details his struggles in accepting the loss of his eyesight to retinitis pigmentosa.

The Ship Who Sang is a collection of stories by science fiction author Anne McCaffrey about the brainship Helva. In a far future, young children with severe physical handicaps can be placed in a life-support shell and specially trained for tasks that a "normal" human would be unable to undertake. McCaffrey, who has described The Ship Who Sang, an early work, as the best story she ever wrote, asked herself one day: "what if severely disabled people were given a chance to become starships?"

The historical novel Four Freedoms deals with the often overlooked contributions made by disabled persons to the war industry during World War II.

== Accessibility of arts and cultural facilities and programs ==
Accessibility is one component of serving the public that arts organizations may overlook. Universal design provides a means of including audience members, or participants, with disabilities. Some of the accessibility factors that cultural facilities and arts organizations can take into account include:

- accessible seating integrated into the audience area;
- accessible production areas, such as the stage, backstage, and orchestra pit areas;
- audio description devices, film captioning, and even sign language interpreting;
- Signage indicating accessible entrances and elevators;
- Accessible height and design for displays, food services, and box office;
- Exhibition labels and printed materials can include braille.
- Visiting a trained low vision Optometrists specializing in the advanced optic techniques that can improve the remaining vision a person with advanced eye disease, Low vision doctors are trained to provide numerous techniques to help to the visually impaired a variety of optical, surgical and adaptive techniques to help one continue performing the field of art.

Adaptive or accessible technology is an innovative way of making traditional arts and cultural programs available to a larger audience that includes people with disabilities. For example, audio can be added to programs through live or pre-recorded captioning. Subtitling, audio description for broadcast programs, DVD and other home entertainment, and Internet projects, are some of the ways arts venues and groups can remove barriers faced by people with disabilities.

== Accessibility Organizations for the Arts ==
=== Canada ===
In Canada, the oldest and largest disability arts organization is the National accessArts Centre (NaAC), which was originally named the In-Definite Arts Society when it was founded in 1975. The NaAC's mission is to provide “artistic training, creation, exhibition, and presenting opportunities for artists with disabilities,” and to share “the power of their creativity through local and global partnerships and advocacy that opens doors for their inclusion in our arts and culture ecosystem.”

Founded in 2012, the Deaf, Disability and Mad Arts Alliance of Canada (DDMAAC) also provides support and solidarity for artists with disabilities. A national initiative of Stage Left Productions, DDMMAC's vision is to nurture “grassroots conduits of cultural affinity, artistic autonomy and disability justice in Canada's Deaf/ Disability/ Mad Arts domain,” and to promote "the collective interests of artists whose lived experience of disablement advances artistic and aesthetic non-normativity. DDMAAC conducted the first national survey of Canada's disability arts domain in 2016, which found that the sector is primarily multidisciplinary, and the greatest concentrations of artists work in theatre, dance, visual art, and new media.

=== United Kingdom ===
- Shape Arts is a charity based in London that develops opportunities for disabled artists.
- Carousel is a learning disability led arts organization based in Brighton, working in music, radio, performance, digital media and film.

=== United States ===
There are many government initiatives that support the participation of people with disabilities in arts and cultural programs. Most U.S. state governments include an accessibility coordinator with their state arts agency or regional arts organization. There are a variety of non-governmental organizations (NGOs) and non-profit groups that support initiatives for inclusive arts and culture.

- Office for Accessibility at the National Endowment for the Arts
- Media Access Group at WGBH WGBH is the Public Television broadcaster for the Boston region. It has three divisions: the Caption Center, Descriptive Video Services (DVS), and the Carl and Ruth Shapiro Family National Center for Accessible Media (NCAM). WGBH pioneered accessible television and video in the United States.
- International Center on Deafness and the Arts provides education, training, and arts projects in areas such as theatre, arts festivals, museums, dance, distance learning, and children's programming.
- Metropolitan Washington Ear is a non-profit organization founded in 1974 to develop projects that assist people with visual impairments. They have a program with Arena Stage in Washington, D.C., to advance audio description, a technique that uses trained narrators to provide descriptions of theatre or film action between lines of dialogue.
- Taping for the Blind provides free 24-hour radio programming, as well as custom recording, and audio description.
- National Captioning Institute is the largest captioning service provider in the United States, working with private broadcasters as well as colleges, corporations, and government agencies. It is a nonprofit corporation.

=== Finland ===
- Culture for All is an association promoting accessibility, inclusion and equality in the art and culture field of Finland.

=== Israel ===
- Kenafayim is an organization and cultural center in Tel Aviv for artists with special needs and mental health challenges.

== See also ==
- Disability in children's literature
- Disability in the media
- Expressive therapy
- Shameless: The ART of Disability (documentary film)
- Social model of disability
- List of fictional characters with disabilities
