= Bufano =

Bufano is a surname. Notable people with the surname include:

- Beniamino Bufano (1890–1970), Italian American sculptor
- Lisa Bufano (1972–2013), American interdisciplinary performance artist
