= Stage Left Productions =

Canadian theatre company

- Address: Canmore, Alberta; Canada

Construction
- Years active: 1999 - Present

Website
- https://stageleftists.weebly.com/

Stage Left Productions is an interdisciplinary performance company dedicated to collaborative arts forms, community theatre practices, Disability art, and social activism. Self-described as “a grassroots, Popular Theatre company of diverse artists and non-artists/catalysts of change who create pathways to systemic equity – in and through the arts,” Stage Left’s activities “promote equity & diversity, provide support services for still-excluded artists and community groups, and produce radical forms of Political Art.” Based in Canmore, Alberta, the company is active in Calgary, as well as provincially, nationally, and internationally. Stage Left’s output is intercultural and multifaceted, encompassing Guerrilla theatre actions, production, presenting, training, education, advocacy, and organizational support work.

== Company Origins ==
Stage Left was established in 1999 by a group of individuals including Michele Decottignies, a lesbian activist-artist with mental and physical disabilities who serves as the current Artistic Director. Decottignies founded a theatre company and adopted Augusto Boal’s Theatre of the Oppressed techniques, which became a cornerstone of the company’s practice. With various productions, Stage Left forged a distinctive aesthetic described by scholar Kirsty Johnston as “a combination of Popular Theatre genres (e.g., Theatre of the Oppressed, Agitprop, Guerrilla theatre, Theatre of the Streets, Workers’ Theatre), Political drama, Documentary theatre, Performance Creation, Digital media and New media art, Interdisciplinarity Production, and Artist-Community Collaboration with anti-oppressive, arts-based change processes.”

Stage Left incorporated as a Nonprofit organization in 2003. In its early years, the company operated primarily through project grants and working collaborations/partnerships, which in turn influenced and shaped funding opportunities. Decottignies explains the approach in a 2010 interview: “We identify programming needs from long-standing and continued engagement with specific communities. We work with our partners to figure out how best to offer programming that may meet those needs. We apply for funding to support that programming.” In 2012, the Canada Council for the Arts “officially recognized the arts and disability sector as a new field of exploration,” and Stage Left started receiving multi-year operational funding to help support and sustain its activities. By that time, the theatre had become “Calgary’s most accomplished performance company engaging exclusively in artist-community collaboration and in professional production with marginalized artists.

== Theatre of the Oppressed ==
Augusto Boal’s popular theatre techniques are an important aspect and hallmark of Stage Left’s activities, from the company’s inception through to the present day. In 2005 the organization was officially endorsed by Boal as an International Centre for Theatre of the Oppressed in Canada. Taking theatre to the people (rather than bringing people to the theatre), Stage Left often collaborates with historically-marginalized groups (though not exclusively so), such as Indigenous Nations; people of colour; folks with mental and physical disabilities; LGBTTTIQ+; and at-risk youth. As Decottignies explains in a 2005 profile article, Stage Left’s mandate is to craft a “professional artist-community collaboration” performance model that will “integrate marginalized people into the creative, artistic, and social life of [the] community by providing safe and accessible space in which they can explore, define, and celebrate their culture; develop confidence, imagination, and artistic expression; contribute to the culture of community in meaningful ways; and express both individual and collective identity.” Moreover, the company uses “the arts to enable marginalized people to establish a visible presence in the larger community, increasing awareness of specific issues and fostering an appreciation of diverse cultures through the presentation of authentic, dynamic, and non-sentimental images of personal experience.”

By the early 2000s, Stage Left was facilitating different streams of activity grounded in Theatre of the Oppressed and other popular and political theatre practices, such as Active Arts for people with disabilities and Acting Out for LGBTTTIQ+ youth. Engagement with First Nations communities has always been central as well, as demonstrated by a 2004/05 joint initiative with Dr. Lindsay Crowshoe (a physician and assistant professor in the Department of Family Medicine at the University of Calgary at that time) intended to improve doctor training and cultural competency for Aboriginal healthcare. The Medical Education journal reports that Forum Theatre was utilized for first-year students “to connect mentally, physically, spiritually and emotionally with the content and begin to develop an appropriate approach towards interacting with Aboriginal patients.” Forum Theatre is an interactive technique in which various problematic scenarios are played out on stage, facilitated by a ‘joker’ or emcee figure who encourages audience members to stop the action on stage, replay it, and insert themselves into the scene in an attempt to find an acceptable resolution for the issue at hand. Three “real-life” scenarios were developed as part of this “comprehensive curriculum project,” which was designed to place “human relationship and understanding at the heart” of medical training, and to “address both a gap in Aboriginal health and a gap in student understanding in Aboriginal and medical cultures. The medical students found Forum Theatre to be “a very effective way of engaging the class in conflict resolution strategies,” and as Crowshoe notes, it is a useful way “to strip away the layers of prejudice and political correctness and start getting at the real issues and truly begin opening up dialogue.” Implementing Forum Theatre practices for medical training is “ground breaking” work, ensuring that Indigenous health issues and curricula are not “an addendum to mainstream medical education,” but rather incorporated “as an integral part of medical education."

The efficacy of this work is evident in the ongoing relationship of Stage Left and Dr. Crowshoe, who have continued to partner on various projects over time. In 2018, the University of Calgary’s Indigenous, Local, and Global Health Office partnered with Stage Left and a team of doctors, including Dr. Lindsay Crowshoe, on a knowledge exchange platform aimed at enhancing “Indigenous youth capacity to understand, articulate, and address toxic stress as well as to influence policy and services affecting their wellness.” Entitled Interrupting Toxic Stress in Indigenous Youth: A Social Congress for Indigenous Health, Stage Left and Dr. Crowshoe once again utilized Theatre of the Oppressed techniques to engage Indigenous youth, and “to invite civil society partners to become more aware, engaged, and networked in identifying options available to prevent and mitigate toxic stress impacting Indigenous youth and communities.”

In addition to educational training, Stage Left uses Theatre of the Oppressed for different kinds of advocacy work. In 2006, the company partnered with the Autism Aspergers Friendship Society to create a Forum Theatre piece involving youth with disabilities, many of them on the Autism spectrum, that was performed at Stage Left’s Disability Arts Festival. The presentation is described as “a brief skit that brought the audience a sense of what it would be like to be a high school student living with the challenges of a disability. The skit highlighted what it would be like to be "different"; the frustration of having learning challenges, the anxiety of dealing with issues of peer acceptance and bullying, and struggles with special needs assistants and teachers who, at times, do not understand.” Audience members were able to stop to the play and insert themselves into the action to find alternate solutions to the problems presented. As one witness remarked, “What was most remarkable with the performance that night was the engagement of the audience. Some of the audience members who joined on stage, themselves had a disability. The play fostered a profound sense of empathy and understanding, while empowered many with ideas on how to cope with a disability themselves, or how to make life better for a disabled person in our community." Moving beyond the usual theatrical paradigms, this groundbreaking work of Stage Left’s created theatre by and for people with disabilities.

That same year, the company was also commissioned by the Alberta Council for Global Cooperation (ACGC) to work with immigrant populations “in rural areas of Alberta in international development issues and global citizenship.” Stage Left created We Are Global Citizens!, a Forum Theatre piece that provided “a safe space for individuals to share, discuss, and learn about the concept of global citizenship and to examine the impact of their own actions on our global community.” The ACGC’s Art Aware! conference kicked off with a performance of the piece, and Stage Left wrapped up the event with a Popular Theatre workshop about arts-based community development. Forging new collaborations, the conference also included a “Painting Our Change” mural workshop, the final products of which toured to high schools as an art exhibit along with subsequent productions of We Are Global Citizens!, presented in Edmonton, Smoky Lake, Fort McMurray, Jasper, Brooks, High River, Three Hills, Kathryn, Sundre, and Rosebud. This “interactive” play was “extremely well-received” and “proved to be a highly effective tool of public engagement for the Council.”

While Stage Left does not consider itself a TYA company, it frequently works with (often at-risk) youth, as evidenced by the high school tour of We Are Global Citizens!, and other productions, such as The Hate Show, an original piece presented at the Calgary International Children’s Festival in May 2011. That play was an intercultural work exploring “how a group of diverse urban teenagers – dis-abled, queer, Muslim, Aboriginal or poor – are forming their identities while trying to fit in with their peers.”

Moving beyond Alberta’s borders, Stage Left has also formed national and international partnerships based on its Theatre of the Oppressed work. The most far-reaching of these was a 2016 Arts exCHANGE Project involving “cross-continental collaboration” between Stage Left and Australia’s Third Way Theatre. The two groups teamed up to offer “equity intervention training” intensives delivered via “embodied learning.”

Theatre of the Oppressed rarely occurs in designated theatre spaces, so it often goes unreviewed and undocumented, and thus, it is worth noting that a company such as Stage Left has collaborated and engaged with thousands of people through its projects over time, far more than a regular theatre company of comparable size.

== Epic Theatre ==
As part of its expansive political theatre practice, Stage Left also engages in Performance Creation for the development of original, often venue-based, performance works. This branch of activity likewise employs artist-community collaboration and draws on a fusion of popular and political theatre techniques, most especially Bertolt Brecht’s Epic Theatre practices.

=== Mercy Killing or Murder: The Tracy Latimer Story ===
Mercy Killing or Murder: The Tracy Latimer Story is considered a “critically important” work by scholars. The subject matter for the play is an actual Canadian crime: the 1993 premeditated killing of 13-year-old Tracy Latimer by her father, Robert Latimer, who claimed he had no choice but to kill her because she was in “constant, excruciating pain” from cerebral palsy. Robert Latimer employed this “necessity” defense in court, creating a sympathetic media storm, and even though the murder was premeditated, he received a second- rather than a first-degree murder sentence resulting in ten years’ jail time. Mercy Killing or Murder: The Tracy Latimer Story, “explores the extreme positions taken during Robert Latimer's trials and offers up voices that were seldom heard amid the dialogue around his case: those of people with physical and developmental disabilities like Tracy Latimer."

The production “sought to redress an imbalance the artists perceived in the media coverage of the criminal case,” which was “more typically focused on public sympathy for Robert as well as debates about euthanasia and the human rights of people with disabilities." Michele Decottignies is credited as the play’s author, but a collaborative building process is acknowledged in the billing credits, which note the play was borne “out of a performance creation process in which all team members are co-authors.”

Company members found that “Tracy Latimer had been belittled, dehumanized, and under-represented in the legal process," and so the creative process “focused on finding, supporting, and featuring” the voices of people with disabilities" Consequently, the play offers up perspectives and viewpoints of people with disabilities, while also presenting additional facts about the case that were not made public at the time. Stylistically, the play draws on documentary and verbatim theatre techniques, quoting from media coverage and trial transcripts for the lines of the Latimers, Judges, Lawyers, Witnesses, and the like, whereas the dialogue of the other characters is original and most often the performers’ own. The latter input was developed collaboratively with extensive research and dramaturgical support over an extended period of time, “by six performers with physical and developmental disabilities, by a host of professional artists, some with disabilities and some not, and by community collaborators interested in giving voice to perspectives of people with disabilities on the case."

Presented in December 2003, both the play's setting and staging emphasized the polarity of perspectives in the case between the general public and people with disabilities, as well as between “experts” and “ordinary people,” and due to the central role of the media, it also had a strong presence on stage throughout, underscored by the use of film and digital media projections. In a homage to the Canadian Workers Theatre Movement (and more specifically to Eight Men Speak), Mercy Killing or Murder employs a trial-within-a-trial set-up in which the people/characters with disabilities function as a jury, while the staging suggests that the audience functions as jury as well. The original production included one of the actors with a disability sitting in the house and delivering his lines from there, implicating and involving the audience further by breaking the fourth wall. Additional tactics along these lines included the audience sharing popcorn with the actors, and at the end of the play, participating in a candlelight vigil for Tracey Latimer, so that spectators were “aligned” with the “layered and complex” perspectives of people with disabilities. As disability theatre scholar Kirsty Johnston writes, “the production did not step back from being critical, judgemental, and hard-hitting in its rhetoric and arguments” while evoking empathetic responses to a dehumanizing situation, a “greater questioning of Tracy Latimer’s story,” and additional understanding about “how disability is understood and experienced in contemporary Canadian society. Given its articulation of “pressing human rights concerns for people with disabilities," the efficacy of popular theatre tactics, and the innovations of disability aesthetics, Mercy Killing or Murder: The Tracy Latimer Story is considered a germinal and canonical work of disability theatre in Canada.

=== Time to Put My Socks On ===
Another piece in the Epic Theatre vein, and a coproduction this time around, is Time to Put My Socks On, the brainchild of Alan Shain, a stand-up comic, dancer, and professional actor with cerebral palsy from Ontario. He worked with Stage Left on a few different shows over time. Time to Put My Socks On was collaboratively written by Shain, Decottignies, and the Associate Artistic Director of Stage Left at the time, Nicole Dunbar. The piece is a dramady exploring “love between a disabled guy, Marc, and his non-disabled lover, Linda,” and it includes “sexuality and adult themes” dealing with “the dynamics of relationships and Marc’s independence as an individual with a disability. A sequel to Shain’s 1999 Still Waiting for that Special Bus, Time to Put My Socks On had a Bow Valley run in 2008, presentations in 2009, and a 2010 tour to Ottawa.

== Disability Ethos ==
Disability Art is defined in Wikipedia as any artwork centring disability in terms of topic, theme, or context. This is contrasted with the Wikipedia entry for Disability in the Arts, which involves the inclusion and direct involvement of people with disabilities, and is sometimes understood as a political act. Stage Left is firmly situated in the latter quadrant, but the company employs the former term, “Disability Arts” (in the opposite manner of current Wikipedia descriptions), as it is understood and utilized by scholars such as Colin Barnes, Emeritus Professor of Disability Studies at the University of Leeds. He defines disability art as: “not simply about disabled people obtaining access to the mainstream of artistic consumption and production. It is the development of shared cultural meanings and collective expression of the experience of disability and struggle. This entails using art to expose the discrimination and prejudice disabled people face and to generate group consciousness and solidarity.”

Decottignies elaborates further in a 2017 interview, citing three distinct (though often overlapping) practices of disability art in Canada: art and disability, disability-inclusive art, and disability-identified art. Art and disability is defined as “traditional art forms practiced by artists with disabilities, without regard for disability politics, culture or pride,” whereas disability-inclusive art refers to “when disabled people receive accommodations that allow non-traditional artists to adapt to traditional aesthetics,” while disability-identified art “embraces and promotes disability politics, culture and pride,” centring “resistance, affirmation, and inversion,” which can be revolutionary in both form (e.g., “when impairments are positioned as a source of artistic enrichment”) and content (e.g., “when disability stereotypes and biases are challenged and reframed, and disability is celebrated as a kind of diversity instead of shame)."

Some claim that “Canada has the oldest history of disability arts production in the world," and Stage Left is one of the country’s longest running disability arts companies, positioning it at the forefront of the movement. As Canadian scholar Kirsty Johnston frames it (quoting Decottignies), Stage Left subscribes to the “global disability arts movement’s promotion of a distinctive artistic practice which resists ‘dominant norms that frame disability as undesirable,’ advances new ideas of equity, and reflects a disability aesthetic.” This means understanding disability “‘as a unique culture in society – the value of which can be commented on and shared with a largely ignorant and biased society in artistically engaging ways – just as ‘queer’ or ‘feminist’ art contributed a new understanding of humanity to society through artistic channels.” In this way, Johnson connects the foregrounding of radical disability arts politics to a larger international scene as a “marker” of Stage Left’s “connection to the global movement,” warranting the use of one of the company’s taglines: “Stage Left: Canada’s leading contributor to the global Disability Arts & Culture Movement.

== Balancing Acts ==
Stage Left also functions as a presenter, as with its notable disability arts festival, Balancing Acts. In Stage Turns: Canadian Disability Theatre, Kirsty Johnston writes that “Since 2000, Canadians have played an important role in organizing disability arts festivals with local, national, and international reach,” and this has “raised the profile of disability arts in general and helped connect discrete pockets of disability arts activity.” Johnston further notes Stage Left’s significant contributions to this phenomenon, starting in February 2002, when the company teamed up with the Calgary SCOPE Society and Transition to Independence to produce Calgary’s first disability arts festival. Entitled “Stages: Unmasking Disability Culture,” the festival “was a celebration of disability culture through shows in drama, dance, music, poetry, photography, and the fine arts,” involving over fifty artists with disabilities. Stage Left and the Calgary SCOPE Society joined forces again at the end of the year in December for another rendition, called “A Second Look at Disability Culture: Another Disability Arts Festival,” this time presented by One Yellow Rabbit. “Second Look” was designed to increase “awareness and appreciation of disability issues by providing authentic, dynamic, and non-sentimental images of disability experience and by integrating disability culture into the creative, artistic, and social life of our community.”

The following year, in December 2003, Stage Left produced the festival again, this time independently, renamed it Balancing Acts, and co-presented it with One Yellow Rabbit. Balancing Acts was repeated annually in December 2004 through to 2009. The company defined the festivals as “a celebration of creative self-expression by people with developmental, physical, or sensory disability, mental illness, brain injury, and/or chronic illness,” articulating “distinct explorations, representations, and declarations of disability identity, highlighting the creativity of disabled performers and offering artistic expressions that celebrate and challenge both the ethos and the perception of disability culture.” Moreover, Balancing Acts “promotes the professional advancement of disabled artists and fosters an appreciative, educated audience for disability culture through the presentation of thought-provoking, innovative performances, visual arts displays, arts-based workshops, and panel discussions. The work of over 100 disabled artists is showcased over the week long festival, with a primary focus on performances of originally created work and on diversity in performance and across disability."

Poignant and political, Balancing Acts, as Kirsty Johnston writes, “built critical connections between Canadian and international disability theatre artists,” featuring acclaimed disability theatre artists such as Mat Fraser, as well as nationally renowned artists, like Alex Bulmer, Jan (JD) Derbyshire, Rachel Gorman, Victoria Maxwell, Alan Shain, and Spirit Synott, as well as homegrown community performance groups like Inside Out and MoMo.

Stage Left expanded its activities and moved into the realm of commissioning in 2008 when it introduced the Balancing Acts Commissioning Project to bring into being “challenging, thought-provoking performance work of high artistic merit from emerging and established professional disabled artists whose work aligns with the goals and principles of the global disability arts and culture movement. The company focused on developing “a global rather than a national culture, and it commissioned ten new plays by artists with disabilities with the intent of a series of mainstage production between the years 2008 and 2010.

The Commissioning Project supported the development of poet, broadcaster, and new media artist Meg Torwl’s That’s So Gay!. Presented in 2009, that piece was “a multidisciplinary solo performance examining gender, disability, and sexuality."

Stage Left presented ten festivals over the course of eight years, involving the participation of more than 1200 artists.

== Disability Arts and Culture Network ==
Stage Left’s activities includes advocacy, alliance building, and support for organizations working towards greater equity, diversity, and inclusion in the arts. One project was the formation of the Disability Arts and Culture Network (DACN) in 2006.

Inspired by her work on the Performance Creation Canada network with Michael Green, Decottignies received funding to create a national presenters’ network for disability arts organizations, which according to Kirsty Johnston, constituted, “[o]ne of the few coordinated national-scale efforts in service of Canadian disability arts.” The goal was for presenters to “forge professional ties, exploring possibilities for coalition, and work toward improving such efficiencies as: developing co-production or sharing touring costs; determining best practices for serving artists with disabilities; or problem-solving around such recurring festival challenges as media relations or arranging travel and accommodation for specific disability needs.” The idea was to create a support network for discussion and coordinated efforts between disability arts presenters.

The inaugural meeting was held in Calgary in March 2006, and it was the first time that disability arts presenters met as a group to discuss the future of disability arts presenting in Canada. The meeting involved people from six organizations – Stage Left for Balancing Acts (Calgary), Ryerson’s Art With Attitude (Toronto), Kick-START (Vancouver), S$DAC (Vancouver), Madness and the Arts World Festival (Toronto), and the Abilities Festival (Toronto). Representatives from each organization met for three days and discussed such issues as: “the balance of professional and community-based art; audience development; sustainability and lack of operating funds; burnout and coping with success; relations with mainstream arts organizations; research and documentation; marginalization; assimilation and cultural appropriation; regional disparities; lack of colleagues/support; competition and cooperation within the network,” and more. A second gathering was held in Toronto in February 2007 at which eight presenters came together to draft vision and mission statements. DACN did not meet again in subsequent years (it was not intended to be a long-term initiative), but the two gatherings laid important groundwork for additional transitions in the field, such as the formation of the DisArts Collective and its Beyond Access High Impact Gathering (which in turn led to the first national arts service association for artists with disabilities in Canada), and historical firsts, such the Canada Council for the Arts officially recognizing disability arts in 2007 with its 2008 – 2011 Strategic Plan, which came about due to “initial lobbying by Decottignies, other network members and disability artists and their supporters across the country.”

== Beyond Access High Impact Gathering ==
Following in the wake of DACN, by 2009, Decottignies was “organizing a separate and differently-oriented network of radical disabled artists ‘concerned with disability arts practices as a unique mode of cultural production, rather than with assimilation into the mainstream.’” The greater political emphasis of the DisArts Collective is manifest in Beyond Access: A Disability Arts Gathering, a conference produced and hosted by Stage Left in their hometown of Canmore, Alberta from September 29 to October 6, 2012. This was “Canada's First National Disability Arts Gathering,”,” and the theme was working together “to shift Canada’s Disability & Arts and Culture Movement discourse away from the over-represented access issues that dominate the milieu to the more pressing artistic practice issues that too many disabled artists are up against.” The Gathering’s core purpose was discussion and conversation to devise collaboratively a proposed national Disability Arts and Culture Strategy via a three-pronged approach involving knowledge sharing, performance labs, and public engagement. The Beyond Access Gathering featured discourse, an artists’ roundtable, a reception with stakeholders, and more, providing “a domain of collective resistance to the cultural erasure of the true purpose and practice of Disability Arts.” Also of significance, it was the Beyond Access Gathering that led to the formation of a more permanent network and an arts service organization; the Deaf, Disabled and Mad Arts Alliance of Canada.

== Deaf, Disability & Mad Arts Alliance of Canada ==
As a Stage Left initiative, the Deaf, Disability & Mad Arts Alliance of Canada (DDMAAC) has been led by Michele Decottignies as the Executive Director from its inception to the present day. Decottignies refers to DDMAAC as “a collective of long-established, disability-identified artists who came together in 2012 in response to increasing disability inequity in the disability arts domain.” For this context, in a 2016 Canadian Theatre Review article, Decottignies adopts a Ryerson University description of “disability arts” as marking “the growing political power of disabled people… [who] use it to counter cultural misrepresentation, establish disability as a valued human condition, [and] shift control to disabled people.”

DDMAC’s mission is to advocate for “disability justice” via the “advancement of counter-cultural, non-normative aesthetics, through the integration of decolonization, anti-racism and anti-oppression into production and presenting processes.”

DDMAAC is also noteworthy for conducting the first national survey of Canada’s disability arts domain. The 2016 study found that in Canada the sector is primarily multidisciplinary, and the most popular disciplines are theatre, dance, visual art, and new media. DDMAAC reported a total of twenty-nine professional companies, approximately 250 artists, several commercial organizations, and an unknown number of amateur arts groups. The survey’s most startling finding was that while “very high degrees of both equity and diversity exist in disability-identified artwork,” disability equity had decreased in the disability arts domain, in so far as people with disabilities were “dependent on the non-disabled for access to the arts. This inequity, it was argued, “seems to be tied to disability arts policies, funding interventions, and market-access collaborations that focus on the inclusion of disabled people in the arts as the principle concern of disability arts, rather than the production of disability-identified art work by qualified disabled artists.” As a result of these findings, DDMAAC committed to three priorities to help bring about greater equity in the disability arts domain in Canada: “(1) educating stakeholders and collaborators on the difference between disability-inclusive art and disability-identified art; (2) promoting disability-identified artists, art forms, and artistic practices; and (3) insisting on increased investment in disability-identified artwork that is produced by disability-identified artists.” The organization has carried out related activities ever since: presenting workshops, forming strategic alliances on various initiatives, and devising policy recommendations for the Canada Council for the Arts.

== Recent Years ==
The breadth of Stage Left’s work is impressive. By 2013, the company had facilitated 150 community arts performances with youth and adults with disabilities, and it had introduced more than 5000 people with disabilities to “arts-based self-advocacy programming.” As of 2016, Stage Left could boast “ten disability arts festivals, fifteen original theatre productions, and thirty digital films,” all of which Decottignies describes as “intercultural, intersecting, and interdisciplinary fusions of feminist art, queer art, and disability art – co-created with teams of diverse collaborating artists from across Canada.” By 2017, add to that the three hundred plus equity workshops that Decottignies conducted across Canada, in the United States, and abroad.

Stage Left continues its work unbated, its statistics ever-growing, except for the usual shut-down period during the COVID-19 pandemic, but even then, the company kept busy. Stage Left’s work with multi-media and digital forms took precedent, and the theatre once again partnered with Dr. Crowshoe (and others) on The KIT (“Keeping It Together”) Podcast. KIT is “an Indigenous-oriented audio/visual podcast showcasing stories and strategies for maintaining wellness in a post-pandemic world.” There are eighteen episodes, hosted by a team of four - Louis Crowshoe, Bridget White, Dr. Adam Murry, and Dr. Lyndsay Crowshoe – who share their own and invited guests’ experiences throughout the pandemic, as well as “the activities and hobbies that helped them ‘keep it together’.”

Coming full circle, since 2021, Stage Left has also been working with Dr. Lindsay Crowshoe and a team of doctors at the University of Calgary on the next iteration of Interrupting Toxic Stress in Indigenous Youth; a continuation of the initiative started in 2018 with the Social Congress for Indigenous Health. The purpose of the recent project is twofold: to involve youth directly in the work as experts with the formation of a Youth Advisory Circle (YAC), and to gather and share learnings via a knowledge exchange platform with a focus on Indigenous approaches to help mitigate toxic stress and foster healthier people. Referring to this ongoing and multi-year project as “Metaxis: An Arts in Indigenous Health Congress”, Stage Left’s role is to support a pan-Indigenous Youth Coalition by working with Boal’s Legislative Theatre techniques to advocate for the Truth and Reconciliation Commission’s Calls to Action, particularly numbers 18 to 22, which address the legacy of residential schools and colonization as it pertains to health in present day Canada. Stage Left has also conducted workshops for the Cummings School of Medicine at the University of Calgary, such as the June 2022 offering, “Disrupting Anti-Indigenous Racism.” This workshop utilized forum theatre techniques with the Indigenous Health Leadership Pathways graduating class as a tool for disrupting racism and bringing about positive change.

Stage Left celebrated its twentieth anniversary in 2023. Apropos of the occasion, the company programmed a retrospective symposium called Step Right Up!. Executed in partnership with the Canadian College of Performing Arts (CCPA) in Victoria, BC, the event was originally planned as a live affair for June, but due to high demand, the format was switched to a digital presentation model for the end of the year. The conference’s content revisited and commemorated Canadian Disability Theatre “firsts” from the last fifty years, such as the first disability theatre production in the western world; Creeps by David Freeman. The symposium’s presenters included Lyle Victor Albert, Rachel da Silveira Gorman, Michele Decottignies, Brian Paisley, Ruth Ruth Stackhouse, Adam Warren, and more. There was one live presentation at the CCPA, a closing event called the CripTeases Cabaret, and it included solo performances and a presentation of Alain Shain and Karine Rathle’s “Closet Freaks,” which is described as “a physical theatre spectacular that strips away the many layers of oppression which exist amid the intersections of disability, sex and society.” Indicative of a post-pandemic approach, the symposium team created a series of videos of the conference presentations, the cabaret included, which will be available on Vimeo in 2024.
