= Disability art =

Creative works with disability-related themes or contexts

Disability art or disability arts is any art, theatre, fine arts, film, writing, music or club that takes disability as its theme or whose context relates to disability.

== Meaning and context ==
Disability art is a creative work, such as visual art, film, writing, music, or fine arts, that explores the themes and experiences of disabilities or is created in the context of disability. It aims to challenge stereotypes about disabled people, by highlighting its meaningfulness instead of having negative connotations. Because it increases representation, disability art helps to encourage more inclusivity into society as a whole.

Disability art is different from disability in the arts, focusing more on the participation of disabled people rather than the subject of the work itself. Disability arts zooms in more on disability as a theme or context, and does not require the artist to be disabled. On the other hand, art created by a person with a disability is not automatically considered disability art because of the artist’s identity.

- An example of disability art by a person without a disability: Alison Lapper Pregnant, 2005, Marc Quinn is disability art because of its context as he reveals the concept of the work was to make "the ultimate statement about disability"
- An example of disability art by a person with a disability: effective, defective, creative, 2000, Yinka Shonibare, shows photos of foetuses from women deemed to be at risk of delivering a defective baby, therefore looking at the relationship of defectiveness and disability.
- An example of art made by a person with a disability that is not disability art: Dorothea, 1995, Chuck Close; relates to his "strict adherence to the self-imposed rules that have guided his art" and "formal analysis and methodological reconfiguration of the human face" therefore conceptually has nothing to do with disability therefore is not disability art. Themes in disability art incorporate with the individual past, and present of how they look at their disadvantages. These disadvantages can be resulted in creating work to better understand them to those who do not. The themes that surround disability art are stereotypes, advantages, disadvantages, inclusion, exclusion, physical and mental health.

=== Context of disability art in the disability arts movement ===
Disability art is a concept which was developed out of the disability arts movement. In the disability arts movement disability art stood for "art made by disabled people which reflects the experience of disability." To be making disability art in the disability arts movement it is conditional on being a person with a disability.

== Development in Britain ==
The development of disability art began in the 1970s / 80s as a result of the new political activism of the disabled peoples' movement. The exact date the term came into use is currently unverified, although the first use of the term in the Disability Arts Chronology is 1986. During this period the term "disability art" in the disability arts movement has been retrospectively agreed to mean "art made by people with a disability which reflects the experience of disability".

As the movement and term developed, the disability arts movement began to expand from what mainly started out as people with a disability cabaret to all art forms. The disability arts movement began to grow year on year and was at its height during the late 1990s. Key exhibitions which looked at disability art happened like Barriers, which was an exhibition considering physical, sensory and intellectual limitation and its effect on personal art practice. (8 Feb – 16 Mar 2007: Aspex Gallery, Portsmouth) and the creation of the Disability Film Festival in London in 1999, – both of which looked at work by disabled people as well as disability arts.

Disabled people's politics in Britain was changed by the Disability Discrimination Act 1995. In the subsequent years as people adapted to the protection of legislation a new wave of politics entered in the disability arts movement. The revised Disability Discrimination Act 2005 signified the end of the domination of art based on discrimination politics in the disability arts movement. A new generation of people with a disability were less political and carried an agenda of integration. This combined with the carers movement highlighted a change in attitude that acknowledged the work of the disability arts movement to claim the term "disability art" but showed a movement away from the idea that only people with a disability could make disability art. It began to be recognised that disability art needs to be "supported by society itself and not just by disabled people".

In 2007 the London Disability Arts Forum held a debate at the Tate Modern on the motion 'Should disability and Deaf art be dead and buried in the 21st Century?' produced in response to arts cuts from the Arts Council faced by disabled-led arts organisations at the time. This debate has become significant in the way Melvyn Bragg's article highlighted how disability art like Marc Quinn's sculpture Alison Lapper Pregnant raise the profile of disability in the arts. This debate and subsequent article set in motion a change for many people to recognise that the new generation of people with a disability and artists did not feel it necessary to control the term disability arts but to open it out for a wider view on disability.

Very few people are aware of disability as a topic of art, mainly due to the lack of accessible and cohesive academic work and publications around the subjects of disability art and the disability arts movement. It has yet to enter into the art curriculum or establish itself as a strongly recognised concept in the arts – so development of the subject needs much more work for it to justify its place as a relevant term long term in the arts. On the other hand, in some instances, artists, curators or theorists who identify has a disability and make, curate or write about disability in their creative practices feel ambivalent about this category.

In some circles disability art is still promoted as "art made by disabled people that reflects the experience of disability." This is most notably the line taken by NDACA, which is predominantly made up of members who were key to the development of the disability arts movement. However, it is also commonly accepted (even by those who strongly align with the disability arts movement) that people without a disability with a personal connection to disability might make valid disability art about their own experiences, so long as they are not claiming to "speak for people with a disability." Places that support disabled artists are organisations like Shape Arts which is an arts charity funded by Arts Council England. Shape Arts works to improve access to culture for disabled people by providing opportunities for disabled creatives, training cultural institutions to be more open to disabled people, and through running participatory arts and development programmes.

== Development in the United States ==
VSA, (previously Very Special Arts), the international organization on arts and disability in the United States, was founded more than 35 years ago by Ambassador Jean Kennedy Smith to provide arts and education opportunities for people with disabilities and increase access to the arts for all. With 52 international affiliates and a network of nationwide affiliates, VSA is providing arts and education programming for youth and adults with disabilities around the world.

The development of disability arts in the US is also tied to several non-profit organizations such as Creative Growth in Oakland, CA, that serves adult artists with developmental, mental and physical disabilities, providing a professional studio environment for artistic development, gallery exhibition and representation and a social atmosphere among peers. Organizations with similar mandates in the Bay Area include Creativity Explored in San Francisco, and NIAD Art Center in Richmond, California. NIAD Art Center – Nurturing Independence through Artistic Development (formerly registered as National Institute of Art & Disabilities) – was established in 1982 by the late Florence Ludins-Katz and the late Elias Katz, PhD. Many other organizations with similar visions and mandates can be found across the country. There also exist disability art & performance collectives such as Sins Invalid which are led by disabled people with intent to explore disabled embodiment.

Currently, the leading scholars in disability arts in the US include Michael Davidson, Lennard Davis, Rosemarie Garland-Thomson, Ann Fox, Jessica Cooley, Joseph Grigely, Georgina Kleege, Petra Kuppers, Simi Linton, Ann Millett-Gallant, Amanda Cachia, David. T Mitchell, Carrie Sandahl, Susan Schweik, Tobin Siebers and Sharon L. Snyder, who write about a range of topics within disability arts, such as performance, literature, aesthetics, visual art, music, art history, theatre, film, dance, curatorial studies, and more.

Bodies of Work: Network of Disability Arts & Culture (including artists and organizations) is one of the leading disability arts festivals occurring in Chicago every few years, whose art illuminates the disability experience. From the local to the international, "bodies of work" explores innovative forms of artistic expression, derived from unique bodies and minds, that explore the disability experience, advance the rights of disabled people, and widen society's understanding of what it means to be human.

Artists who identify as disabled and make work about disability are growing in numbers, as are curators who identify as disabled and curate exhibitions on disability. Katherine Ott is a curator at the National Museum of American History at the Smithsonian Institution who has curated a number of exhibits on the history of the body, disability, ethnic and folk medicine, integrative and alternative medicine, ophthalmology, plastic surgery and dermatology, medical technology, prosthetics and rehabilitation, sexuality, visual and material culture and other ephemera. Places that support disability artists aims to organize and take action for disabled artists to thrive and emerge. While deconstructing the discrimination practices and policies faced by disabled artists, programs and studios work to support and evolve the community of experienced disabled artists. Some places are professional studios where disabled people can work, create, and put on a show. Communities as such are Art Enables, Disability/Arts/NYC (DANT).

== Australia ==
In Australia, there are non-profit, government-funded organizations dedicated to providing resources and support towards activities in disability art such as Arts Access Australia (peak body), Accessible Arts (NSW), DADAA (WA), Arts Access Victoria (VIC) and more.

== Canada ==
Non-profit, government-funded organizations dedicated to providing resources and support towards activities in disability art exist in Canada. Organizations include the Indefinite Arts Centre (Calgary, AB); Arts & Disability Network Manitoba (Winnipeg, MB); Kickstart Arts – Disability Arts and Culture (Vancouver, BC); Stage Left Productions (Canmore, AB), which also heads up the Deaf, Disability and Mad Arts Alliance of Canada (DDMAC); and the Tangled Art + Disability Gallery, which showcases Disability Art in Toronto (ON). These organizations work to increase opportunities and access for people with disability as artists, arts-workers, participants and audiences. They offer services to their members, such as representation and advocacy, facilitation and development, information and advice, grants and more. Many of these organizations use the Social model of disability, thus they use the term 'disability' to refer to barriers, rather than medical conditions or impairments. They might categorize 'people with disability', to mean anyone with sensory or physical impairments, hidden impairments, intellectual impairments, learning difficulties or mental health conditions. These organizations recognize and value the culture and language of the Deaf community, and include them within this definition in recognition of the similar barriers that many deaf people face accessing the arts.

In Canada, there are also well-established networks of governmental departments involved in programming disability arts. During the Depression of the 1920s in Canada, the federal government created the Dominion-Provincial Training Program to alleviate unemployment and social issues by training young leaders and carrying out community projects such as trail and park development. Thus national, provincial and municipal parks were born. By the 1950s, a formal approach to parks and recreation developed which included granting programs to construct recreational facilities, such as community centres. Today, these facilities operate under health and well-being policy frameworks that address inclusion and access goals. These goals are met through the development of sports and arts programs, including those that fall under disability arts.

An example of Canadian artists exploring disabilities in their work is the Canadian collective Kiss & Tell. Comprising Persimmon Blackbridge (b.1951), Lizard Jones (b.1961), and Susan Stewart (b.1952), the Kiss & Tell collective primarily focused on lesbian sexuality and representation in their work, though themes relating to disability, mental health, and chronic illness permeated as well, due to the connections between sexuality and the body. Persimmon was open about her mental health, as she had learning disabilities and severe depression that both affected and inspired her work. Lizard Jones shared her multiple sclerosis diagnosis, exploring the relationship between this illness and her sexuality. Lizard also served as the artistic director of the Vancouver non-profit, Kickstart Disability Arts & Culture.

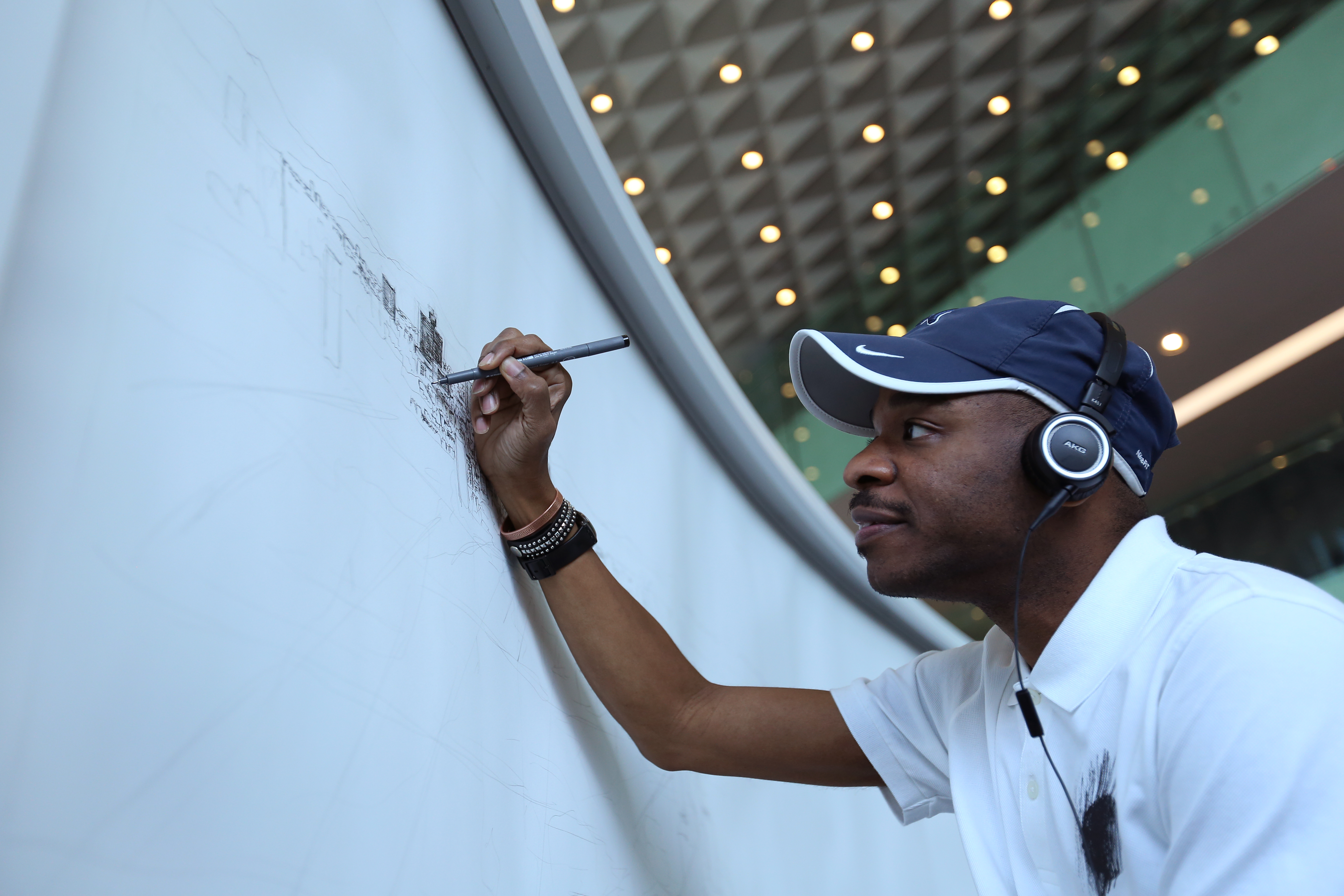
Stephen Wiltshire, 24 October 2016, Disabled Artist

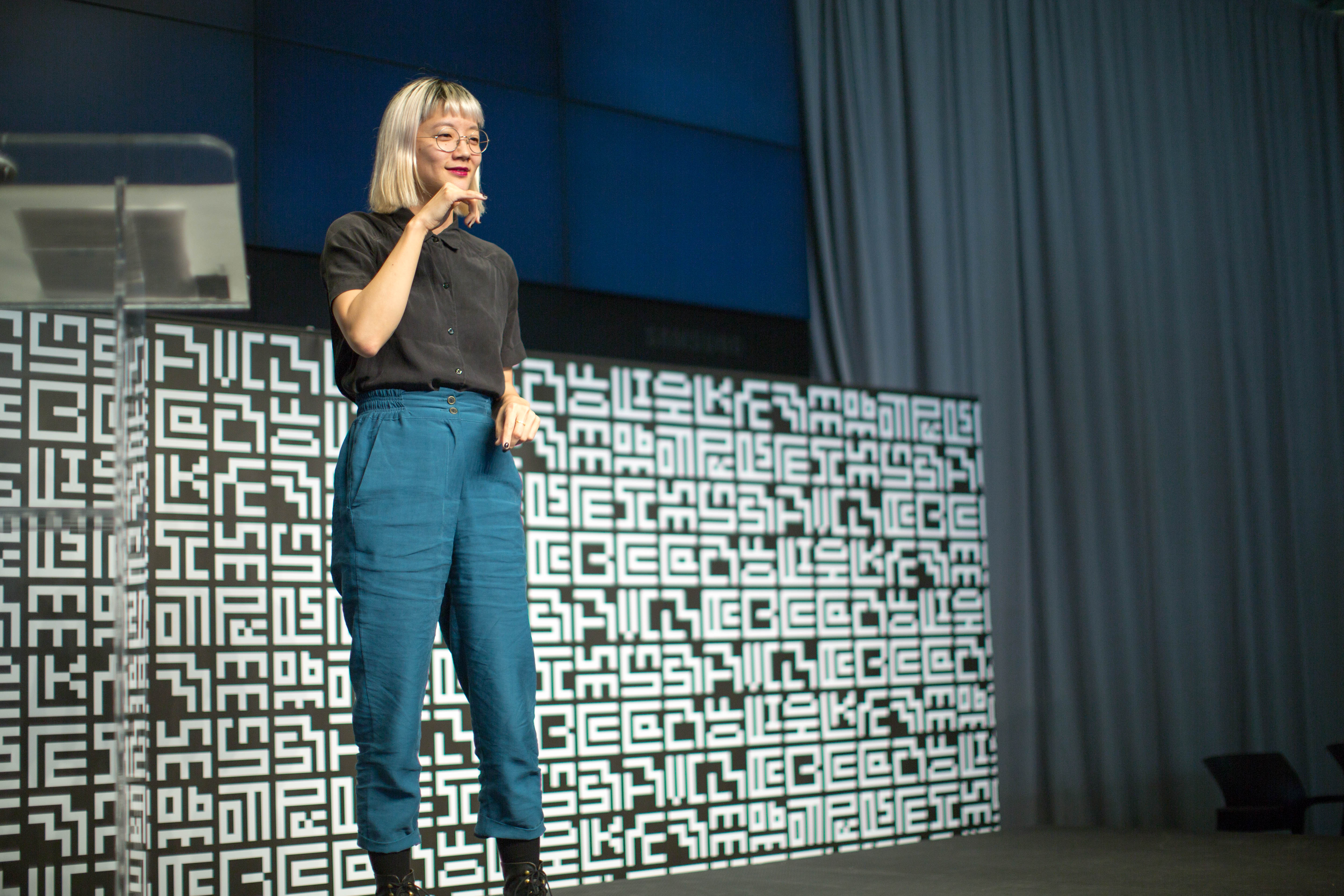
Christine Sun Kim, 13 February 2020, Disable Artist

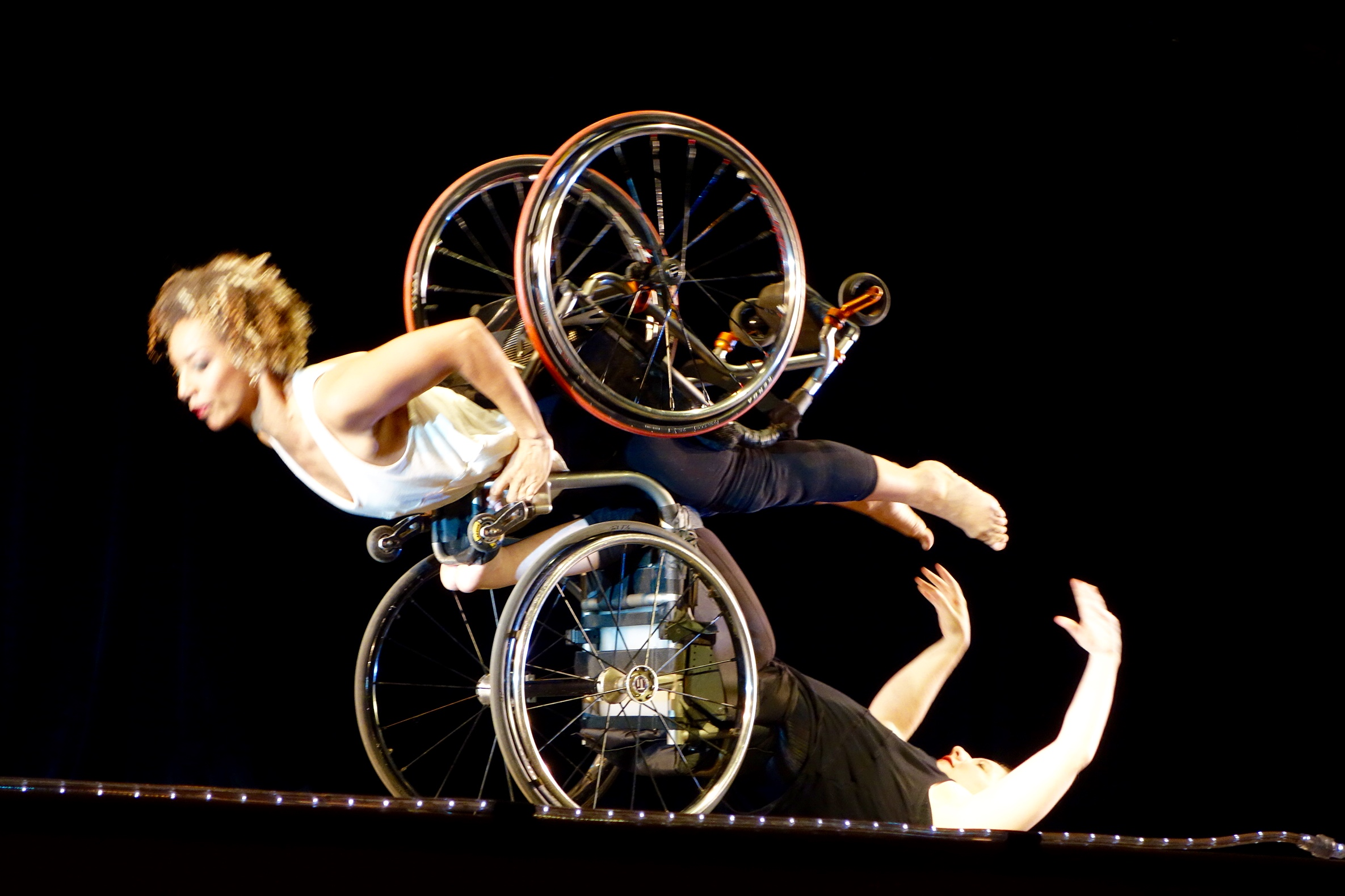
Alice Sheppard and Laurel Lawson perform "Excerpt from Snapshot" Minsky's Burlesque, New Jersey, ca. 1954

== Notable artists ==
- Rora Blue
- Lisa Bufano
- Paul Darke
- Jerron Herman
- Carolyn Lazard
- Riva Lehrer
- Park McArthur
- Finnegan Shannon
- Alice Sheppard
- Christine Sun Kim
- Sunaura Taylor
- Stephen Wiltshire
- Constantina Zavitsanos
- Kiss & Tell
