= Robert Latimer =

Canadian farmer and convicted murderer

- Born: March 13, 1953 (age 73)
- Occupation: Farmer
- Spouse: Laura Latimer
- Children: Tracy Latimer (deceased), 3 others
- Conviction: Second-degree murder
- Penalty: Life sentence with no possibility of parole for 10 years; paroled in 2010

Robert William Latimer (born March 13, 1953) is a Canadian canola and wheat farmer who was convicted of second degree murder in the death of his daughter Tracy Lynn Latimer (November 23, 1980 – October 24, 1993). This case caused a national controversy concerning the definition and ethics of euthanasia as well as the rights of people with disabilities, and resulted in two Supreme Court decisions, R. v. Latimer (1997), on section 10 of the Canadian Charter of Rights and Freedoms, and later R. v. Latimer (2001), concerning cruel and unusual punishments with reference to section 12 of the Charter. Latimer was released on day parole in March 2008 and was granted full parole in December 2010.

== Farm and family ==
Before his imprisonment, Latimer lived near Wilkie, Saskatchewan, on a 1280 acre (520 ha) wheat and canola farm with his wife, Laura, and their four children.

=== Tracy Latimer ===
Tracy Lynn Latimer was born November 23, 1980. An interruption in Tracy's supply of oxygen during the childbirth caused severe cerebral palsy, resulting in severe intellectual and physical disabilities, including violent seizures which were controlled with seizure medication. She had little or no voluntary control of her muscles, wore incontinence pants, and could not walk or talk. Her doctors described the care given by her family as excellent.

The Supreme Court judgment of 1997 noted, "It is undisputed that Tracy was in constant pain". In her medical testimony Dr. Dzus, Tracy's orthopaedic surgeon, noted "the biggest thing I remember from that visit is how painful Tracy was. Her mother was holding her right leg in a fixed, flexed position with her knee in the air and any time you tried to move that leg Tracy expressed pain and cried out". She also noted that despite having a hip that had been dislocated for many months Tracy could not take painkillers because she was on anti-seizure medication which, in combination with painkillers, could lead to renewed seizures, stomach bleeding, constipation, aspiration and aspiration pneumonia. Robert Latimer reported that the family was not aware of any medication other than Tylenol that could be safely administered to Tracy.

Considering it too intrusive, the Latimers did not wish a feeding tube to be inserted, though according to the 2001 Supreme Court judgment, it might have allowed more effective pain medication to be administered and it might have improved her nutrition and health. During her life, Tracy had several surgeries, including surgery to lengthen tendons and release muscles, and surgery to correct scoliosis in which rods were inserted into her back.

Tracy attended school regularly in Wilkie. People who worked with Tracy in group homes and schools described her smile, love of music and reaction to horses at the circus. According to the Crown prosecutors' brief presented at the second trial, "She also responded to visits by her family, smiling and looking happy to see them. There is no dispute that through her life, Tracy at times suffered considerable pain. As well, the quality of her life was limited by her severe disability. But the pain she suffered was not unremitting, and her life had value and quality."

== Tracy's murder ==
In October 1993, Dr. Dzus recommended and scheduled further surgery on November 19, 1993, in the hope that it would lessen the constant pain in Tracy's dislocated hip. Depending on the state of her hip joint, the procedure might have been a hip reconstruction or it might have involved removing the upper part of her thigh bone, leaving the leg connected to her body by only muscles and nerves. The anticipated recovery period for this surgery was one year. The Latimers were told that this procedure would cause pain, and the doctors involved suggested that further surgery would be required in the future to relieve the pain emanating from various joints in Tracy's body. Dr. Dzus reported that "the post operative pain can be incredible", and described the only useful short-term solution being the use of an epidural to anesthetize the lower part of the body and help alleviate pain while Tracy was still in the hospital.

On October 24, 1993, Laura Latimer found Tracy dead. She had died under the care of her father while the rest of the family was at church. At first, Latimer stated that Tracy had died in her sleep. When confronted by police with autopsy evidence that high levels of carbon monoxide were found in Tracy's blood, Latimer confessed that he had killed her by placing her in his truck and connecting a hose from the truck's exhaust pipe to the cab. He said he had also considered other methods of killing Tracy, including Valium overdose and "shooting her in the head".

Latimer said his actions were motivated by love for Tracy and a desire to end her pain.

== Murder trials and appeals ==
Latimer was charged with first degree murder, convicted of second degree murder by a jury, and sentenced to life imprisonment without possibility of parole for 10 years. He subsequently lost an appeal to the Saskatchewan Court of Appeal. In February 1996, the Supreme Court of Canada agreed to hear a further appeal; and in June 1996, the original Crown prosecutor was charged with attempting to obstruct justice by jury tampering. In February 1997, the Supreme Court of Canada ordered a new trial for Latimer because of the allegations of jury tampering; it began on 22 October 1997. Latimer was convicted of second degree murder. The second trial judge found that the statutory life sentence with no parole for ten years was cruel and unusual, infringing section 12 of the Charter. He granted Latimer a constitutional exemption from the mandatory life sentence and instead sentenced Latimer to one year in prison followed by a year of probation. On appeal both the Saskatchewan Court of Appeal and the Supreme Court of Canada held that the statutory sentence did not infringe section 12, and sentenced Latimer to a life sentence with no parole for ten years.

Latimer began serving his sentence on January 18, 2001, and was incarcerated at William Head Institution, a minimum-security facility located 30 kilometres west of Victoria, British Columbia, on Vancouver Island. While in prison, he completed the first year of carpentry and electrician apprenticeships. He continued to operate his family's farm with the help of a manager.

In 2001, the Supreme Court of Canada ruled that Latimer's crime could not be justified by the defence of necessity, and found that, despite the particular circumstances of the case, the lengthy prison sentence given to Latimer was not cruel and unusual, and therefore not a breach of section 12 of the Canadian Charter of Rights and Freedoms. The Court also ruled that Latimer was not denied rights to jury nullification, as no such rights exist, and his prison sentence was thus upheld.

== Public debate ==
=== Support for Latimer ===
A 1999 poll found that 73% of Canadians believed that Latimer acted out of compassion and should receive a more lenient sentence. The same poll found that 41% believe that mercy killing should be legal. Ethicist Arthur Schafer argued that Latimer was "the only person in Canadian history to spend even a single day in prison for a mercy killing" and that compassion and common sense dictated a reduced sentence and the granting of parole. In the introductory college coursebook, The Elements of Moral Philosophy, James Rachels and Stuart Rachels present Latimer's actions sympathetically.

=== Support for Latimer's conviction and sentence ===
Numerous disability rights groups obtained intervenor status in the Latimer's appeal to the Supreme Court of Canada, arguing that killing a disabled child like Tracy is no different from killing a non-disabled child and should carry the same penalty. To do otherwise, they argued, would devalue the lives of disabled people and increase the risk of more such killings by their caregivers. Religious groups representing the Roman Catholic church and the Evangelical Fellowship of Canada also appeared as intervenors in Latimer's Supreme Court appeal.

Latimer's 2007 application for day-parole was rejected primarily because he still denied any wrongdoing. Maclean's columnist Andrew Coyne argued that the National Parole Board was right to expect remorse on Latimer's part, because to do otherwise might inspire others to similar actions.

== Parole ==
On December 5, 2007, Latimer requested day parole from the National Parole Board in Victoria. He told the parole board that he believed killing his daughter was the right thing to do. The board denied his request, saying that Latimer had not developed sufficient insight into his actions, despite psychological and parole reports that said he was a low risk to reoffend unless he was in the same situation again. In January 2008, lawyer Jason Gratl filed the appeal on Latimer's behalf, arguing that in denying parole, the board had violated its own rules by requiring admission of wrongdoing and by ignoring the low risk for reoffending. In February 2008, a review board overturned the earlier parole board decision, and granted Latimer day parole stating that there was low risk that Latimer would re-offend. Latimer was released from William Head Prison and began his day parole in Ottawa in March. On his release he stated that he planned to work for a new trial and for identification of the pain medication that the 2001 Supreme Court ruling suggested he could have used instead of killing his daughter.

He later relocated to Victoria, where he was required to live in a half-way house five days a week and could live in his own apartment two days a week. He had been seeking looser parole conditions since August 2009. In July 2010, the National Parole Board denied his request to be allowed to leave the halfway house for five days a week. In August 2010, an appeal was made to the Federal Court of Canada. Justice Mactavish ordered the board to reassess Latimer's application. The National Parole Board was also directed by the Judge to apply the least restrictive conditions consistent with society's protection. Latimer was assessed to have a low risk of re-offending. In September 2010, the parole board ruled he could be away from his Victoria halfway house for five days a week, but had to check in on the other two days. On November 29, 2010, Latimer was granted full parole and this decision took effect on December 6, 2010.

In 2013, Latimer challenged international travel restrictions set by the parole board. These restrictions were overturned in 2014. Since this decision, he has been able to travel internationally, including a vacation to Peru.

In 2018, Latimer applied for a ministerial review of his sentence. As of 2026, he believes that his killing was justified and that his conviction should be overturned or be pardoned. He also believes that disability rights activism regarding his case has been "sadistic" and that legislation regarding assisted death should be extended to minors.

== In popular culture ==
In the song "Latimer's Mercy" from his album Scream, Ozzy Osbourne references the Latimer case.

First presented as a radio play on CBC in 1996, and then adapted and produced on stage by the Great Canadian Theatre Company in 2005, Mourning Dove by playwright Emil Sher explores the quandary that Robert Latimer faced as a father.

Premiering at Stage Left's Balancing Acts Disability Arts Festival in 2003, Mercy Killing or Murder: The Tracy Latimer Story, a community collaboration by Michele Decottignies and company, presents a multimedia, Epic Theatre approach to the subject that centres the experiences of Tracy Latimer and people with disabilities.

== See also ==
- Disability Day of Mourning
- Groningen Protocol
