= JD Derbyshire =

Canadian theatre artist, comedian, and writer

- Born: Jan Derbyshire; Calgary, Alberta, Canada
- Died: September 26, 2025
- Spouse: Michael Rohl (divorced)
- Children: Kacey Rohl

Jan "JD" Derbyshire (died September 26, 2025) was a Canadian theatre artist, comedian, and writer. They performed their one-person show, Certified, across Canada, including in Vancouver where it won two Jessie Richardson Theatre Awards.

== Early life and education ==
Derbyshire was born and raised in Calgary, Alberta. They completed a master's degree from the Ontario College of Art and Design in Inclusive Design in 2014.

== Career ==
Derbyshire's play, Funny in the Head, about their experiences with bipolar disorder, was commissioned by Stage Left Productions, and it premiered at the Balancing Acts Disability Arts Festival in Alberta, Canada in 2008. In 2010, alongside the Paralympic Games, Derbyshire performed their one-person show Funny in the Head at the Kickstart Disability Arts and Culture Festival, and it was the only show performed at Kickstart.

Derbyshire developed another one-person show, Certified, which premiered at the Vancouver Fringe Festival in 2016. They have performed Certified for Handsome Alice Theatre (Calgary) in 2018, Touchstone Theatre (Vancouver) in 2019, at One Yellow Rabbit's High Performance Rodeo (Calgary) in 2020, and at the Progress Festival (Toronto) in 2020. Derbyshire was set to perform Certified as part of Gateway's 2020–2021 season but the show was cancelled due to COVID-19.

In 2020, Derbyshire was writer-in-residence at Mount Royal University. They were a recipient of a Fleck Fellowship at the Banff Centre for Arts and Creativity in 2021. In 2023, their first novel, Mercy Gene: The Man-made Making of a Mad Woman, a work of auto-fiction, was published by Goose Lane Editions.

== Personal life ==
Derbyshire and their ex-husband, TV director Michael Rohl, had a daughter, actress Kacey Rohl. They were non-binary and used they/them pronouns. They died on September 26, 2025.

== Works ==
=== Plays ===
- Labour Unions, the Brotherhood of Mothers
- Freaky Jane Fine Takes on the Serious World
- Bearded Circus Ladies
- Ingenius Speculations — co-written with Kim Selody, Rita Bozi, and Roy Surette
- Joke You
- Maharani and the Maple Leaf
- Under the Big Top
- All In
- Funny in the Head
- Turkey in the Woods
- Sorry Toronto, Really I Am
- Certified

=== Novels ===
- Mercy Gene: The Man-made Making of a Mad Woman (2023)

=== Exhibitions ===
- Re:purpose, August 9–September 7, 2014, Art Work: 'Value Village'. Curated by Syrus Marcus Ware and Elizabeth Sweeney, The Robert McLaughlin Gallery

== Awards ==
Year	Award	Category	Work	Result	Notes	Ref.
2020	Jessie Richardson Theatre Awards	Outstanding Original Script	Certified	Won		
2020	Jessie Richardson Theatre Awards	Critics' Choice Innovation Award	Certified	Won	for Touchstone Theatre	
