= Lisa Bufano =

American dancer and artist

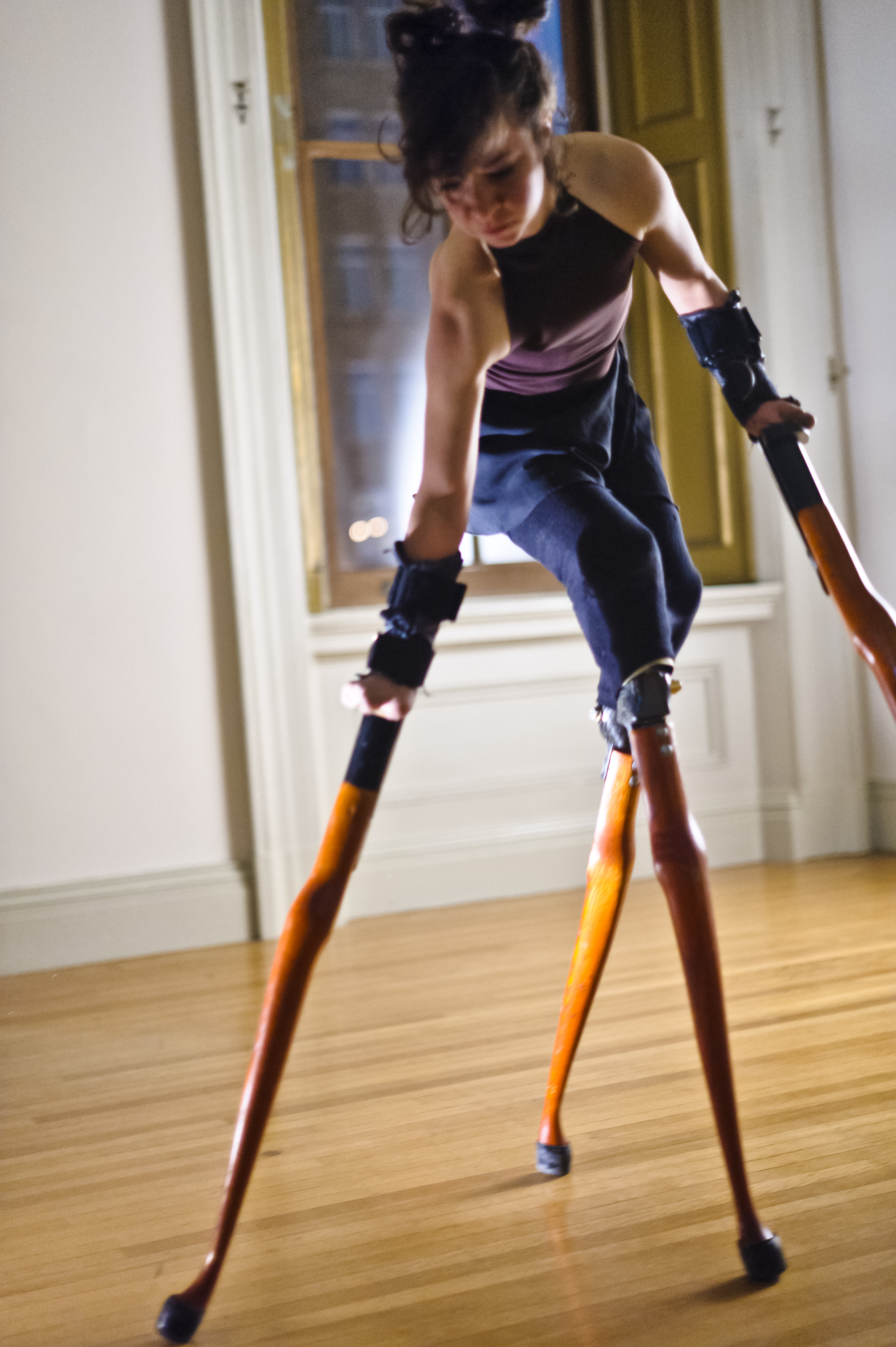
- Lisa Bufano performing on her signature orange Queen Anne table legs at All Worlds Fair 2013.
- Born: October 20, 1972; Bridgeport, Connecticut, U.S.
- Died: October 3, 2013 (aged 40); San Francisco, California, U.S.

Lisa Bufano (October 20, 1972 – October 3, 2013) was an American interdisciplinary performance artist whose work incorporated elements of doll-making, fabric work, animation, and dance.

== Early life ==
Born to Louis A. Bufano and Elizabeth "Betty" Bufano in 1972 in Bridgeport, Connecticut, Bufano graduated from Tufts University in 2003, and later from the School of the Museum of Fine Arts, Boston (SMFA) in 2003. A competitive gymnast as a child (and a go-go dancer in college), she became a bilateral below-the-knee and total finger-thumb amputee due to a life-threatening staphylococcus bacterial infection at the age of 21.

== Career ==
After losing her lower legs and most of her fingers and thumbs, Bufano began her performance and dancing career when a professor at the University of Linz doing research on the lives of amputees discovered her web page and offered her a stipend to perform in Vienna. She toured from 2006 to 2010 with the AXIS Dance Company, performing works variously choreographed by Victoria Marks, Joe Goode, and Kate Weare to audiences in Austria, Croatia, Slovenia, and Canada, and performed to a packed house at the John F. Kennedy Center for the Performing Arts in a program honoring fellow amputee and dancer Homer Avila (featured in Modern Dance Videos) as well as at the Baryshnikov Arts Center and Judson Memorial Church, among other venues.

Her dance work typically incorporated a variety of prosthetics and props (such as using wooden Queen Anne table legs as legs and arms), but also included segments where her unadorned body was the focus of the performance. According to Bufano she manipulated her body as a way to explore alternative locomotion (at age 34 she ran several miles a day on high-tech carbon fiber prosthetic legs), corporeal difference, her sexual identity (an aspect of her work which was of particular interest to the artistic LGBT community), and animation/manipulation, interests which led to many fruitful collaborations.

Bufano listed among her influences medical drawings, historical wax models and dolls, and optical toys; flip dolls and paper dolls; the structural aspects of Japanese jointed dolls, Hans Bellmer's doll work, Louise Bourgeois' cell installations, and the animation of Jan Švankmajer and the Brothers Quay. One of her main projects was a white muslin dress which turned into a squid, for which she sewed thousands of detailed suckers. "She loved sewing sculptures made of fabric," her brother remarked in a remembrance. "She had a thing for the creepy-cute, the exotic, the bizarre. Things that were dark but also beautiful."

She explained her aesthetic and political goals when she claimed that:

Despite my own terror and discomfort in being watched (or, maybe, because of it), I am finding that being in front of viewers as a performer with deformity can produce a magnetic tension that could be developed into strength. I attempt to channel this tension by exaggerating the mode of physical difference (for example, presenting myself on stilts).

She likewise explained during her time at the School of the Museum of Fine Arts, Boston:

My eye has always been drawn to abnormal forms ... It's just that now my tool is my body. I'm still animating a form, but it's my own form ... I'm not an astounding dancer ... But being a performer with a deformity, I find that there's a gut response in audiences, an attraction/repulsion aspect to it that can be compelling. I just hope that there's a balance between that gut response and the substance of a performance.

She has had an artist residency at the Contemporary Artists Center, North Adams; and also at the 8th Street Air Program (2010), Boise, Idaho. She was a Franklin Furnace Fund recipient in 2006–2007.

Originally based in Boston, Massachusetts, and relocated to San Francisco, California in December 2011.

== Death and legacy ==
Lisa Bufano died by suicide on October 3, 2013, in San Francisco, California; no suicide note was found. Two months later, her brother reflected on the inexplicable nature of her death.

I'm surrounded by speculation about why Lisa took her own life. Facebook, friends, family members, and her fans would all like to know. They want it to make sense to them. They want to feel okay. Ultimately they want her back.

But I am having great difficulty with all of this. Lisa didn't like other people projecting their idea of who she was on her. We'll never understand why. It will never make sense.

I believe she lived her entire life and that her life was many lives. I don't believe it was cut-off short. Her mission was completed and she must have understood that fact when she departed from this world. She was alone with her dog in her home in the middle of the night.

More than a year after her death, her work, along with that by Cara Levine, Shari Paladino and Sadie Wilcox, was included in Four Choreographies at the Worth Ryder Art Gallery in Berkeley, California. A further retrospective was held Storefront Lab in San Francisco in 2015.
