= List of children's books featuring deaf characters =

Children's books featuring deaf characters

Approximately 466 million people or five percent of the world's population has disabling hearing loss (term defined and used by the World Health Organization); 34 million of these are children. Despite approximately one third of people over 65 years of age being affected by disabling hearing loss Deaf adult characters are significantly underrepresented in children's books; even within books which do include a Deaf character. There have been several studies into how Deaf children are portrayed in children's literature. Historically children's books have generally conformed to an outdated cultural view of Deaf people, which resulted in books which portray those characters who happen to be Deaf as in need of saving or to be pitied. In more recent times society has improved attitudes towards deaf people and this has led in part to better representation in literature. This article highlights some of the books which reflect the diversity found within the deaf community.

There have been several campaigns such as "toy like me" and "in the picture" (by Scope UK) to encourage toy manufacturers and children's publishers to more accurately reflect society. In response to these campaigns there has been a gradual increase in the quality and quantity of Deaf characters in children's books. BookTrust, a UK children's charity, have published advice for illustrators and publishers on how to naturally include Deaf and disabled characters in children's books.

The term 'Deaf' is generally used to refer to a linguistic and cultural minority group who use sign language and are members of Deaf culture. The term 'deaf' or 'hard of hearing' is commonly used to refer to individuals with partial deafness or hearing loss. People who identify as hard of hearing or small 'd' deaf are generally not members of the Deaf sign language-using community. This distinction is useful in academic settings where precision is needed. For the purpose of this article the term 'deaf' is used to include characters with any level of deafness/hearing loss, their communication styles, use of hearing technology or none and cultural setting such as living with a hearing family or being part of the Deaf Sign Language using community to enable the reader to form their own judgements on where the character falls on the Deaf/hearing culture continuum. As in real life many fictional characters participate at least in part in both Deaf and hearing cultures and manage cross cultural relationships.

== Board books for young children featuring deaf characters ==
Books are listed by publication date, although books are only included in the list if they have a deaf character some books also contain illustrations of other disabled characters and so when present this information has also been included in the table. Deaf adult characters are highlighted in Bold.

Title (Series)	Author/Illustrator	Deaf and disabled characters / Awards won	Year 1st Published	Child's Age	Book type
My Family's Joy	Hanna Ahn, Jenny Han	My Family’s Joy follows six-year-old Lyra as she celebrates her grandmother’s birthday with her family, including her baby sister, father, and grandparents, who are all Deaf. The story centers Deaf culture and sign language as something rich, joyful, and deeply bonding.	2025	3-10	picture book
The Animal Orchestra Plays Beethoven	Sam Taplin, Ag Jatkowska	Describes the life of **Ludwig van Beethoven** and how in later life he lost his hearing and how for the last 10 years of his life couldn't hear at all. During that time he composed Symphony No. 9. and only "ever heard it in his head."	2020	0–2 yrs	Board book that plays music
This old Man	Claire Keay	The illustrations include a **medical professional** wearing a hearing aid.	2019	2–6 yrs	Board Book & Soft Cover
Baby Loves the Five Senses: Hearing! (Baby Loves Science)	Ruth Spiro, Irene Chan	The illustrations include a child wearing a hearing aid and another wearing a cochlear implant. The book also includes a reference to ASL.	2019	0–2 yrs	Board Book
Round and Round the Garden	Annie Kulber	The illustrations include a character with hearing aids, a child with glasses and a child with an arm splint.	2018	0–2 yrs	Board Book
Zoom, Zoom, Zoom	Annie Kulber	The illustrations include a child with a hearing aid, a child wearing an eye patch, a child with glasses, another using a wheelchair.	2018	0–2 yrs	Board Book
Sleeping Bunnies	Annie Kulber	The illustrations include a child with a hearing aid, a child with glasses and a child with a walking frame,.	2018	0–2 yrs	Board Book
Sleep Tight, Teddy! (New Chatterboox)	Jo Byatt	The central character wears a cochlear implant on her right side. The illustrations also show her cochlear implant charging station on her bedside table. Earlier editions have different illustrations and they don't include any deaf characters.	2018	0–3 yrs	Board Book
Feeling Great! (Just Like Me!)	Ailie Busby	The illustrations include a toddler using a hearing aid. Earlier editions have different illustrations and they don't include any deaf characters.	2018	0–2 yrs	Board Book
Farm (Wheels at work)	Cocoretto	The illustrations include a **character** wearing a hearing aid in each ear while riding a quad bike.	2017	1–4 yrs	Board Book
Clive is a Librarian (Clive's Jobs)	Jessica Spanyol	The illustrations include Wilfred wearing a hearing aid and Anisa wearing a leg splint and another child wearing glasses.	2017	1–3 yrs	Board Book
Clive is a Waiter (Clive's Jobs)	Jessica Spanyol	The illustrations include Wilfred wearing a hearing aid and Anisa wearing a leg splint and another child wearing glasses.	2017	1–3 yrs	Board Book
Clive is a Teacher (Clive's jobs)	Jessica Spanyol	The illustrations include Wilfred wearing a hearing aid and Anisa wearing a leg splint and another child wearing glasses.	2017	1–3 yrs	Board Book
Sing (Amazing Me!)	Carol Thompson	The illustrations include two children wearing hearing aids and another child wearing glasses.	2017	1–3 yrs	Board Book
Baby Talk	Auditory Verbal UK	In this picture book all the photos are of babies and young children wearing hearing aids or cochlear implants.	2016	0–2 yrs	Thick Card
Goat goes to Playgroup	Julia Donaldson, Nick Sharratt	The illustrations include Monkey wearing a hearing aid; Monkey features several times in the book.	2015	2–5 yrs	Board Book & Soft Cover
Autumn (Seasons)	Ailie Busby	The illustrations include a child wearing a hearing aid, a child wearing 'Boots and a Bar' which implies the child had talipes (club foot) and another child with a built-up shoe. Part of a series which won a Practical Preschool Silver award (UK) 2015.	2015	0–3 yrs	Board Book
Spring (Seasons)	Ailie Busby	The illustrations include a child with a hearing aid, children wearing glasses and a child wearing a wrist splint. Part of a series which won a Practical Preschool Silver award (UK) 2015.	2015	0–3 yrs	Board Book
	Carol Thompson	The illustrations include a child wearing a hearing aid and a child with Down syndrome. Part of a series which won Practical Preschool Silver award.	2014	1–4 yrs	Board Book
Sun (Whatever the weather)	Carol Thompson	The illustrations include a child signing 'SUN' in BSL, a child with Down's syndrome, another child wearing a protective helmet and a child with a nasal oxygen cannula and a walking frame. Part of a series which won Practical Preschool Silver award.	2014	1–4 yrs	Board Book
Jump! (Little movers)	Carol Thompson	The illustrations include a child wearing a cochlear implant, a child wearing leg splints and another child wearing a safety helmet. This book was included in Guardian's top 10 most inclusive books in 2013.	2013	1–3 yrs	Board Book
Blankies	Carol Thompson	The illustrations include a child with a hearing aid and a child wearing an eye patch.	2012	0–3 yrs	Board Book
Mary had a Little Lamb (Classic Books with Holes)	Marina Aizen	The illustrations include a child wearing a hearing aid and a child using a wheelchair.	2012	3–6 yrs	Board Book and Soft Cover
School (First Time)	Jan Lewis	The illustrations include a child with a hearing aid, a child wearing a leg splint and another child using tripods.	2012	2–6 yrs	Thick Card
Performance (First Time)	Jan Lewis	The illustrations clearly show a teacher wearing a radio aid/FM system presumably for the benefit of a deaf child, but there are several female children wearing square hairclips which could be interpreted as hearing technology; there is no clear illustration of a child wearing a hearing aid or cochlear implant etc. The illustrations also include a child with their leg in a cast and using crutches.	2012	2–6 yrs	Thick Card
What Can I feel (Small senses)	Annie Kulber	The illustrations include a child wearing a hearing aid. Selected for Bookbug Baby Pack by the Scottish Book Trust.	2011	0–3 yrs	Board Book
What Can I taste (Small senses)	Annie Kulber	The illustrations include a child wearing a hearing aid and a child wearing a leg splint.	2011	0–3 yrs	Board Book
What Can I hear (Small Senses)	Annie Kulber	The illustrations include a child wearing a hearing aid and a child wearing an eye patch.	2011	0–3 yrs	Board Book
What Can I see (Small senses)	Annie Kulber	The illustrations include a child wearing a hearing aid.	2011	0–3 yrs	Board Book
Vet (First Time)	Jess Stockham	The illustrations include a child wearing a hearing aid, a child wearing glasses and another child with a guide dog.	2011	2–6 yrs	Thick Card
Doctor (First Time)	Jess Stockham	The illustrations include a **receptionist** wearing a hearing aid and a child wearing a hearing aid who is visiting a doctor. Another child has eczema. Part of a series which won a Bizziebay Silver Award in 2010.	2011	2–6 yrs	Thick Card
Pat-a-Cake	Annie Kulber	The illustrations include a child wearing a hearing aid. Part of a series which won a Practical Pre-School Gold Award 2014 (UK).	2010	0–2 yrs	Board Book
You and Me (New Baby)	Rachel Fuller	The illustrations include a child wearing a hearing aid.	2009	1–3 yrs	Board Book
Baby sitter (First Time)	Jess Stockham	The illustrations show the **babysitter** and child signing 'DUCK' to each other in BSL. This book has won a Practical Pre-School Bronze Award (UK) 2009, Oppenheim Toy Portfolio, Best Book Award Gold (US) 2010 and won a Bizziebaby Silver Award (UK) 2011.	2009	2–6 yrs	Tough Card
Big Day Out (First Time)	Jess Stockham	The illustrations include two background characters signing, while waiting in a queue to buy tickets. The **adult** is signing 'TICKET' in BSL and the child is signing 'EXCITED' in response. The pictures also include the hearing loop sign used in the UK. This book was a joint winner of a Practical Pre-School Bronze Award (UK) 2009 and a Bizziebaby Silver Award 2011.	2009	2–6 yrs	Tough Card
Together (Just Like Us!)	Jess Stockham	The illustrations include a young child wearing a hearing aid while playing in the sand and another child wearing a safety helmet. Part of a series which won a Practical Parenting Gold Award.	2008	1–3 yrs	Board Book
Making Friends! (Just Like Us!)	Jess Stockham	The illustrations include a child with a hearing aid and a child with Down syndrome. Part of a series which won a Practical Parenting Gold Award.	2008	1–3 yrs	Board Book
I'm a Little teapot	Annie Kulber	The illustrations include a child wearing a hearing aid. Part of a series which won a Practical Pre-School Gold Award (UK) 2014.	2007	0–2 yrs	Board Book
Bounce & Jiggle (Baby Gym)	Sanja Rešcek	The illustrations include a baby with a hearing aid. This book won a Practical Pre-School Bronze Award (UK) 2008.	2007	0–2 yrs	Board Book
Touch and Tickle (Baby Gym)	Sanja Rešcek	The illustrations include a baby with a hearing aid and a wheelchair-using parent or carer. This book has won the Oppenheim Toy Portfolio Best Book Award Gold, Myra Robertson Baby Book of the Year 2009, Practical Pre-School Bronze Award 2008 and Oppenheim Toy Portfolio Special Needs Adaptable Product Award.	2007	0–2 yrs	Board Book
Little Ocean Explorers (Little explorers)	Anthony Lewis	The double-sided character which can be inserted into each scene, features a girl wearing a hearing aid on a retainer cord on one side and a boy without a hearing aid on the other side.	2007	1–4 yrs	Board Book
See-Saw! Nursery Songs (Nursery Time)	Annie Kubler	The illustrations include a child wearing a hearing aid and another with a cochlear implant.	2006	1–3 yrs	Board Book
Peek-a-Boo! Nursery Games (Nursery Time)	Annie Kubler	The illustrations include an adult wearing a hearing aid and a child wearing a leg splint.	2005	2–3 yrs	Board Book
Noo-Noo! (My New Baby)	Carol Thompson	The illustrations include a baby wearing a hearing aid and a baby wearing an eye patch.	2009	0–2 yrs	Tough Card

== Picture books with deaf characters ==
The books are listed in date order. deaf authors and illustrators are highlighted in bold.

Table of Children's picture books with deaf Characters
Title	Author/Illustrator	Deaf characters	Child's Age	Year 1st Published
The Gallaudet Eleven: The Story of NASA's Deaf Bioastronauts	Kerry O'Malley Cerra Kristina Gehrmann	Tells the true story of eleven deaf men, recruited by NASA and the US Navy from Gallaudet University at the beginning of the Space Race, to study the effects of motion sickness. Their ten years of service helped American win the Space Race.	4-9	2026
The First Splash in Space	Twinkl original	Central character wears a right-sided CI, which clearly visible on the front cover, and in subsequent illustrations, she uses speech to communicate.	4-7 yrs	2025
Dreams Take Flight: The Story of Deaf Pilot Nellie Zabel Willhite (Own Voices, Own Stories)	**Brittany Richman**	Based on the true story of how Nellie became deaf aged four after an illness and then later attended a deaf school in 1905 and learnt ASL, lip reading, and speech and how she later in adult life became the first deaf pilot in the United States.	8-12 yrs	2025
Sound Switch Wonder	Dr. Christine J. Ko, **Owen Whang**, **Katie Crumpton**	A young boy has cochlear implants that he takes off when it's too noisy. The book discussion his experience when not wearing his CI's, he uses speech to communicate mostly and signs I love you (ASL) under water.	5-8 yrs	2024
Mara hears in Style	Terri Clemmons, **Lucy Rogers**	Mara has purple hearing aids and hot pink earmolds and starts school, the teacher forgets to use the radio aid/FM and the dining hall is noisy and child ask about her hearing aids. Some ASL in the illustrations.	4-8 yrs	2024
Listening to the Quiet	Cassie Silva	The mother in the story is losing her hearing, the family learn sign language.	3-6 yrs	2024
Dance with Oti: The Turtle Tango	Oti Mabuse, Samara Hardy	Book about dancing, with girl with right sided CI on cover and in the book	4-7 yrs	2024
Cesaria Feels the Beat	Denise Rosario Adusei, **Priscila Scores**	Cesaria a black deaf child (unaided Sign language user) wants to perform barefoot at the carnival so she can feel the vibrations.	3-6 yrs	2024
Butterfly on the wind	**Adam Pottle**	Aurora (unaided, sign language user) is nervous about using sign language to present a fairy tale at a talent show. The butterfly sign gets sent and returned to her from the worldwide deaf community.	3-6 yrs	2024
So Much More to Helen: The Passions and Pursuits of Helen Keller	Meeg Pincus	This book focuses on the various personal and professional achievements of Helen Keller the famous deaf-blind activist and author.	6-9 yrs	2022
The Moonlight Zoo	Maudie Powell-Tuck	Eva the central character has hearing aids and must find the zoo.	3-6 yrs	2022
Sometimes I Like the Quiet (Duke the Deaf Dog ASL Series)	Kelly Brakenhoff, Caterina Baldi	Duke the Deaf Dog is the only deaf member of his family. He uses ASL and English to communicate.	3-9 yrs	2022
My Dawg Koa (Duke the Deaf Dog ASL Series)	Kelly Brakenhoff, Theresa Murray	Duke the Deaf Dog is hard of hearing and his best friend Koa is deaf. They use ASL to chat with each other.	3-9 yrs	2022
Listen: How Evelyn Glennie, a Deaf Girl, Changed Percussion	Shannon Stocker, Devon Holzwarth	Based on the true story of Evelyn Glennie, the book tells the story of how during childhood her ears hurt and her auditory nerve became damaged so she started to wear hearing aids. She uses speech to communicate and the book tells how she overcame prejudice and went on to become a world-famous percussionist.	4–8 yrs	2022
Making Friends: A lift-the-flap board book about friendship	Pat-a-Cake (Author), Louise Forshaw	The illustrations include a diverse range of people including a young boy wearing glasses and a red cochlear implant on the cover.	3+ yrs	2021
Dance with Oti: The Bird Jive	Oti Mabuse	Front cover shows a girl with brown skin with a left sided cochlear implant	4-7 yrs	2021
Standing Up to Racism: A lift-the-flap board book about standing together	Dr Pragya Agarwal, Louise Forshaw	The illustrations include a diverse range of people including a white girl with a blue cochlear implant and girl with brown skin with a red cochlear implant and a boy with brown skin and a green hearing aid. The pictures also show a girl wearing glasses with an eye patch, a boy in a wheelchair and several children and adults wearing glasses.	3+ yrs	2021
The Visible Sounds:	Yin Jianling, Yu Rong, Filip Selucky	Based on the true story of professional Chinese dancer, Lihua Tai, who is Deaf and uses sign language and some speech to communicate. The book tells how the central character called MiLi aged two has an illness and becomes profoundly deaf. Initially, she experiences isolation and grief, later vividly discovering that she could experience sound through feeling the vibrations.	4–8 yrs	2021
See What I can do?	Jon Roberts, Hannah Rounding	The book covers many children with disabilities including a child who is deaf.		2021
The Most Awesome Character in the World	**Adam Pottle**, Ana Sanfelippo	The book's protagonist Philomena is a young deaf girl who suffers from excessive feedback in her hearing aids. She cannot use her imagination when wearing them and prefers to communicate with sign language.		2020
Farts Make Noise (Duke the Deaf Dog ASL Series)	Kelly Brakenhoff, Theresa Murray	Duke the Deaf Dog wears a hearing aid on one ear and signs ASL with his family.	3-9 yrs	2020
Can Bears Ski?	**Raymond Antrobus** **Polly Dunbar**	The central character baby Bear is deaf and gets hearing aids in the book. The storyline incorporates some deaf awareness tips.	3–6	2020
Mila gets her Super Ears	Ashley Machovec	The central character Mila tells the story of how her hearing loss was detected when she was a baby and how aged two she became eligible for and had cochlear implant surgery.		2020
Zola Gets Hearing Aids	**Narita Snead**, Dawn Campbell	The central character Zola has a hearing aid fitted in the story.	5–12 yrs	2020
The adventures of Billie BAHA and her Super HEARo friends!	Jessica Jordan-Hogan	The central character Billie has microtia, is hard of hearing and wears a Baha. In the book Billie goes to school with a range of deaf characters including one who is deaf-blind (shown wearing hearing aids and glasses) and another who wears cochlear implants and a wheelchair-user wearing a Baha.		2020
Mikah's Wandering Feet (Mikah Can! 2)	Tabitha J Page, Alexander Kulieshov	Mikah monkey is deaf, he lives in a Zoo enclosure with his family and uses Auslan sign language to communicate with his family.	3–10 yrs	2020
Bessie Needs Hearing Aids	**Jenna Harmke,**Toby Mikle	The central character Bessie, a rabbit, has hearing aids fitted in the story.		2020
Maxi's Super Ears	Maggie Klein	The central character, Maxi has his first set of hearing aids fitted aged three. This is a central part of the story.		2020
The Quest for the Cockle Implant	**Maya Wasserman**, **Lucy Rogers**	The main character a mermaid, Angel, is Deaf and wears bilateral cochlear implants, the book also features another deaf character called Merkitty and they communicate in BSL. The storyline incorporates some Deaf awareness tips and a BSL version is available on ITV's Signed Stories app. The book was published by the NDCS in the UK.		2020
Ling Ling Bird, seen and heard: A joyous tale of friendship, acceptance and magic ears! (The Adventures of Ling Ling Bird)	Tanya Sauders	The main character is a Bird called Ling Ling who is profoundly deaf and has "Magic ears" (cochlear implants) and speaks clearly now after many hours of speech therapy.	6–8 yrs	2020
Never Mind (Duke the Deaf Dog ASL Series)	Kelly Brakenhoff, Theresa Murray	Duke the Deaf Dog is the only deaf member of his family. He does not like being told "never mind."	3-9 yrs	2019
Sammy and His Super Ears	Kay Hoffman Brocato, Cameron Wilson	One of the main characters, Sammy the turtle wears cochlear implants.	8–12 yrs	2019
Just Read!	Lori Degman	One page has an illustration showing a child signing 'I LOVE YOU' in ASL with the text, "I read with my voice or my hands, using signs". The illustrations also feature a child reading a book in braille.	4–7 yrs	2019
Super Kena: A Girl Make Fierce with Hearing aids	Becky Cymbaluk, Zuzana Svobodova	The main character is a female superhero called Super Kena who wears two hearing aids.		2019
The Secrets Hidden Beneath the Palm Tree	Angeliki Stamatopoulou-Pedersen, Tety Solou	One of the main characters is Jacob and attends a mainstream school; he wears hearing aids.		2019
Preemie Powered: The Story of SoundWave	Maria Addison Gray	The main character 'recruit' wears two blue hearing aids.		2019
What did you say?	Dr Zeenat Abdulshakur, Tajmul Riyaz Tajmul Rizwan, Tazmeen Rukhsana Tajmul Rizwan	The main characters are Ray and Rui who are identical twins. Ray has ANSD, wears hearing aids and uses speech to communicate.		2019
Deafinitely Awesome: The Story of Acorn	Mary L. Motley, Timy Sullivan, Jenny Campbell	The central character, Acorn the dog is Deaf and once this is identified, the people caring for the dog teaches him to understand sign language.		2019
Deaf Cinderella	Adonia Smith Maureen Klusza	The Cinderella in this story is Deaf and uses ASL to communicate.		2019
The Brave Princess and Me	Kathy Kacer, Juliana Kolesova	This book is based on part of the life of Princess Alice of Battenberg who was born deaf and used sign language, speech (English, German and Greek) and lip reading to communicate.	5–6 yrs	2019
This Old Man	Claire Keay	The illustrations include a medical professional wearing a hearing aid. Also available as a board book.	2–6 yrs	2019
Happy To Be Me	Emma Dodd	The illustrations include a BME young boy wearing a bright blue hearing aid in his right ear. There is also another child wearing glasses and a child sitting in a wheelchair.	3–5 yrs	2019
Ninita's Big World: The True Story of a Deaf Pygmy Marmoset	Sarah Glenn Marsh, Stephanie Fizer Coleman	This story is about a deaf monkey.	4–7 yrs	2019
Out of My Window; a Rhyme and Sign Adventure	Sue Searle, Chris Hammond, Cath Smith, Shelley Ensor	The illustrations include characters with hearing loss (CI and HA?) and diagrams of BSL signs.	2–7 yrs	2018
There's Only One You	Kathryn Heling, Deborah Hembrook, Rosie Butcher	The illustrations include a girl with ginger hair wearing two hearing aids. There is also a character wearing glasses, another using a forearm crutch and another using a wheelchair.	3–7 yrs	2018
The Rock that Couldn't Roll	Jay Miletsky, Erin Wozniak	The illustrations include a 'rock' called Leesie wearing a BAHA on a light pink soft band.	4–8 yrs	2018
My Happy Place	Amy Crockford, Daniel Butler	The main character Amy is 10 years old and Deaf and uses ASL to communicate.		2018
The Monster at the Park	Leah Carroll, Ekaterina Voytes	One of the central characters, Magi, wears a cochlear implant on her right side.		2018
Ezekiel Helps Clean the House (Ezekiel the Deaf Therapy Dog)	Mary Lyons, Tom Lyons	The main character, Ezekiel, is Deaf and his owners instruction him in American Sign Language.		2018
Violet's Story	Frances Clark	The central character, Violet, loses her hearing as a child then gets a cochlear implant.	5+ yrs	2018
Silent Star: The Story of Deaf Major Leaguer William Hoy	Bill Wise, Adam Gustavson	Book on the life of William Hoy who became deaf after having meningitis, aged three.	6–11 yrs	2018
Elephant and the Lost Blanket	Alex Nadioo	The central elephant character in this story wears bilateral hearing aids and the tiger is wearing bilateral cochlear implants.		2018
Boy	Phil Cummings, Hane Devries	The central character is Deaf and uses Auslan sign language, writing and gestures to communicate.		2018
Mikah's Big Move (Mikah Can! 1)	Tabitha Page, Alexander Kulieshov	Mikah monkey was born deaf and uses Auslan and the BANZSL alphabet.	3–7 yrs	2018
Meet Justin: A Story About a Hearing Impairment (Someone Special Books)	Heather McCarthy, Kate Ryan	Justin has "hearing impairment" and the book contains some deaf awareness tips at the back. (Only available as a Kindle edition.)		2017
Silent Days, Silent Dreams	Allen Say	This biography of James Castle who was born two months premature and was deaf and autistic was an accomplished artist despite difficulties with communication as he never learned to read or write, use sign language or speech. The Book does not contain images of James's work. This book won the ALA Schneider Family Book Award for Young Children in 2018.	8–12 yrs	2017
National Geographic Readers: Helen Keller (Level 2) (Readers Bios)	Kitson Jazynka	Picture book biography of Helen Keller.	5–8 yrs	2017
Proud to be Deaf	**Ava Beese,**, **Lilli Beese,** **Nick Beese,** Romina Martí	The central character, Ava, is Deaf and wears hearing aids and also uses BSL to communicate. The book also features her parents who are both Deaf and many other Deaf role models.	6–8 yrs	2017
Helen's Big World (Big Words): The Life of Helen Keller	Doreen Rappaport, Matt Tavares	A picture biography of Helen Keller who became Deaf-Blind aged 19 months and used a mixture of the Rochester method, ASL, speech and braille.	6-9 yrs	2017
The Gingerbread Witch	Paul Miller	The main characters are twins and one twin, Anders, is Deaf and uses ... to communicate.		2017
Fairy Magic	Cerrie Burnell, Laura Ellen Anderson	The main character wears a BAHA hearing aid on a soft band.	3–6 yrs	2017
A Bear Hug at Bedtime	Jana Novotny-Hunter, Kay Widdowson	The main character wears a hearing aid.	3–7 yrs	2017
And so, Ahmed hears	Dawn Doig	Central character Ahmed can't hear speech before being fitted with his hearing aids.		2017
Marvelous Mary: Deaf with Cochlear Implants	Emily Christensen	The central character, Mary, uses sign language, speech and bilateral cochlear implants to communicate.		2017
Jake and Jasmine to the Rescue	Karen Harlow, Sandra Aguilar	Jake is one of the two main characters, he is deaf and has a cochlear implant.	4–7 yrs	2017
Emma's Ears	Gianna Righi	The central character, Emma, was born profoundly deaf and gets a cochlear implant after trailing her hearing aid.	5–6 yrs	2016
Max and His Hearing Aids	Emily Mikoski	The central character, Max, wears hearing aids. (Kindle edition only)		2016
Ranvir Cannot Hear	Genevieve Yusuf, Shermain Philip	The central character, Ranvir the Elephant, is Deaf.		2016
Dodger Dog Meets Shea: Volume 3 (Adventures of Dodger Dog)	Karen Gee, Kim Wymer	The main character, Dodger, meets Holly, a Deaf dog and they learn to communicate.		2016
The Sound of All Things	Myron Uhlberg, Ted Papoulas	The book is written from the perspective of one of the hearing children of Deaf parents who use ASL to communicate. This book has won several awards including Notable Books for a Global Society 2017, Notable Social Studies Trade Books for Young People 2017, CCBC Choices 2017, Best Children's Books of the Year (Starred) 2017.	6–10 yrs	2016
The William Hoy Story: How a Deaf Baseball Player Changed the Game	Nancy Churnin, Jez Tuya	William Hoy is Deaf and uses ASL to communicate. This book has won several awards including Storytelling World Resource Award Honor Book 2017, New York Public Library Best Books for Kids 2016, Best Children's Books of the Year 2017 and Louisiana Young Readers' Choice list 2018.	4–8 yrs	2016
Daisy and Ted's Awesome Adventures	Alex Nadioo	Daisy, one of the main characters, wears a hearing aid.	4–7 yrs	2016
The Little Deaf Squirrel	Mrs. Barbara Richford	The central character is Deaf	5–6 yrs	2016
Simone	Sonya B. P. Giridhar	The central character, Simone, uses an FM system to hear the teacher. As her ears are covered by her hair in the illustrations, you can't see the cochlear implant or hearing aids.		2016
My Friend is Deaf	James Kerwin, Marie Kerwin	One of the two main characters, James, is Profoundly Deaf and uses Auslan to communicate.		2015
The Elephant in the Room	Jim Bombicino, Gildas Chatal	The central character Skyler has hearing loss and wears hearing aids and uses speech to communicate.		2015
Mike & the Deaf Student (The Walk a Mile in My Shoes Club)	Sharon Straka Hendricks	David, the Deaf student, is bullied but after spending a day Deaf he learns some ASL and then stops bullying David.	5-9 yrs	2015
Maxi's Super Ears	Maggie Klein	The central character, Maxi, gets hearing aids.		2015
Goat Goes to Playgroup	**Julia Donaldson**, Nick Sharratt	The illustrations show a monkey wearing a hearing aid.		2015
I Am Helen Keller (Ordinary People change the world)	Brad Meltzer	A picture book biography of Helen Keller.		2015
The Five of Us	Quentin Blake	There are five main characters and one is deaf.	5–7 yrs	2014
Young Thomas Edison	Michael Dooling	This book is a biography of Thomas Edison. He became Deaf (totally deaf on his left and hard of hearing on his right side) aged approximately 9–12 years old. He used speech and lip-reading to communicate.		2014
Hands & Hearts: With 15 Words in American Sign Language	Donna Jo Napoli Amy Bates (Il	The mother and daughter in this story use ASL to communicate.		2014
The Mitten String	Jennifer Rosner / Kristina Swarner	One of the main characters, Bayla, is Deaf and cares for her baby.	3–7 yrs	2014
Harmony Hears a Hoot	Fara Augustover	The central character, Harmony, gets a hearing aid and uses an FM system at school.		2014
Kylie Gets a Cochlear Implant	Marilyn C. Rose	The main character, Kylie, loses her hearing after an illness aged six and after lip-reading and using sign language for two years (without trailing hearing aids) had a cochlear implant.		2013
Dachy's Deaf (Dinosaurs Friends)	Jack Hughes	The central character, Dachy, is deaf and uses a hearing aid.	8–12 yrs	2013
Helen Keller's Best Friend Belle	Holly M. Barry, Jennifer Thermes	The central character of this book is Helen Keller who became deaf-blind after an illness at 19 months old. In the book, she uses ASL fingerspelling, braille and speech to communicate.	4–8 yrs	2013
My Magic Ears	Bob Kennedy	The central character has bilateral cochlear implants fitted in the book.		2013
Max and George Make New Friends	Matthew Robins	One of the central characters, Max, is Deaf and uses BSL to communicate.		2013
Annie and Helen	Deborah Hopkinson, Raul Colón	This book is about the life of Helen Keller (Deaf-Blind) and her teacher Annie Sullivan (Blind.)	4–8 yrs	2012
Silent Star: The Story of Deaf Major Leaguer William Hoy	Bill Wise, Adam Gustavson	A picture book biography of William Hoy who became Deaf after having meningitis aged three.	6–11 yrs	2012
Helen's Big World: The Life of Helen Keller (Big Words)	Doreen Rappaport, Matt Tavares	A picture book biography of Helen Keller.	6–8 yrs	2012
Let's Hear it for Almigal	Wendy Kupfer	The central character Almigal has lost her hearing and then gets bilateral cochlear implants. Mom's Choice Gold Award Winner for Values and Life Lessons.	5–7 yrs	2012
Can You Hear a Rainbow?	Jamee Riggio Heelan, Nicola Simmonds	The central character, Chris, is Deaf uses sign language, hearing aids, lip-reading to communicate.	5–8 yrs	2012
Sophie's Tales: Overcoming Obstacles	Melanie Paticoff	The central character, Sophie, is a dog with hearing loss who uses a cochlear implant.		2012
Freddie and the Fairy	**Julia Donaldson**, Karen George	The fairy is the story has difficulty hearing speech with clarity and the illustrations show a bow in the fairy but no clearly visible hearing technology.	3–5 yrs	2011
Samantha's Fun FM and Hearing Aid Book!	Samantha Brownlie	The main character, Samantha, wears a hearing aid and uses an FM unit.		2011
Gracie's Ears	Debbie Blackington	The main character, Gracie has hearing loss and gets hearing aids.		2011
John Gets Ready for School	Joanne Zellweger, Andy Elliot	One of the main characters, John has a hearing aid on his left ear and a cochlear implant on his right side and communicates using speech.		2010
Dad, Jackie, and Me	Myron Uhlberg, Colin Bootman	The father in the story is a Deaf ASL user. This book has won American Library Association Schneider Award, the 2006 Storytelling World Award, the IBBY Outstanding Books for Young People with Disabilities, and International Reading Association Teacher's Choice Award	4–8 yrs	2010
The Cloud	Hannah Cumming	The illustrations include two background characters signing to each other.		2010
Rivers' Walk	Natalie Johnson	The Rabbit gets hearing aids.		2010
Sunny and her Cochlear Implants	Susanna Dussling	The central character, Sunny, is deaf and initially, she uses hearing aids and then moves onto cochlear implants.		2010
Sophie's Tales: Learning to Listen (Sophie's Tales)	Melanie Paticoff	The main character Sophie is deaf, she has hearing aids initially then uses a cochlear implant to 'learn to listen.'		2010
Julia's Words	Judith L. Roth, Brooke Rothshank	One of the two main characters, Julia, is Deaf and uses ASL to communicate	6–10 yrs	2009
Now I Can Hear	Connie Losacano, Matthew Graves	The main character gets hearing aids and then can hear sounds.		2009
A Birthday for Ben	Kate Gaynor	The central character, Ben, is Deaf, he goes to a mainstream school and uses hearing aids, sign language and speech to communicate?. This book was awarded a silver medal at the Moonbeam children's books awards in 2009.		2009
The Printer	Myron Uhlberg, Henri Sorensen	The father is Deaf and uses ASL to communicate. Some of his father's colleagues are also Deaf ASL users.	4–8 yrs	2009
I Am Deaf	Jennifer Moore-Mallinos, Marta Fabrega	The main character, Lana, is Deaf and uses a combination hearing aids, FM system, lip reading and ASL to communicate.	6-9 yrs	2009
Enrique Speaks with His Hands	Benjamin Fudge, Tim Edmonson	The central character Enrique was born deaf and then he is taught sign language by he meets other Deaf children.	3+ yrs	2008
Helen Keller: The World in Her Heart	Lesa Cline-Ransome, James Ransome	This book is a picture book biography of Helen Keller.	5-9 yrs	2008
Abby Gets a Cochlear Implant	Maureen Cassidy Riski	The central character Abby wears purple hearing aids and has progressive hearing loss and then gets cochlear implants. The book focuses on the process of the cochlear implant assessment and then the aftercare.		2008
My Heart Glow: Alice Cogswell, Thomas Gallaudet, and the Birth of American Sign Language	Emily Arnold McCully	Based on the true story of how Deaf education in America was developed, Alice becomes Deaf after illness aged two.	6-9 yrs	2008
A Day at the Park (Hattie and Friends)	Lesley Bremington, Karen Middleton	One of the main characters Hattie is deaf and the illustrations show her wearing a cochlear implant.		2008
Friends, Like You	Melissa Griswold, Cynthia Fisher	The two main characters, Molly and Max, –both are Deaf; Molly uses a cochlear implant and Max wears hearing aids. Their teacher uses an FM system to help them hear.		2007
Lucy: Loud and Clear	Laila Lavan, Beatriz Iglesias	The central character is using a hearing aid and uses sign language to communicate.	5–6 yrs	2007
My Hearing Loss and Me: We Get Along Most of the Time	John F. Anderson Jr., William Bushell	The books central character Jack uses a cochlear implant and spoken language to communicate.	4–12 yrs?	2004
Jason and the Blind Puppy	Dawn McMillan, Warwick Bennett	The main character, Jason, is deaf and wears hearing aids and uses sign language to communicate.	7+ yrs	2004
Missing!	Dawn McMillan	The main character, Jason, is deaf and wears hearing aids and uses sign language to communicate.		2004
I'm the Boss of my Hearing Loss	Amy Knoll	The central character uses hearing aids and speech to communicate.		2004
Moses Sees a Play	Isaac Millman	The main character who uses ASL to communicate teaches some signs to a new child, then the children see a performance put on by the Little theatre of the deaf.	4–8 yrs	2004
Moses Goes to the Circus	Isaac Millman	The main character Moses uses ASL to communicate with his hearing family and teaches his young sister some ASL.	4–6 yrs	2003
Secret Signs: Along the Underground Railroad	Anita Riggio	The central character, Luke, is Deaf and uses sign language to communicate	5–7 yrs	2003
Lucy	Sally O. Lee	The central character has single sided deafness.		2003
Moses Goes to a Concert	Isaac Millman	The main character, who uses ASL to communicate, goes with his deaf classmates to see a concert, one of the musicians is also deaf.	5–8 yrs	2002
Helen Keller and the Big Storm	Patricia Lakin, Diana Magnuson	This book tells the story of part of Helen Keller's life.	6–7 yrs	2002
Moses Goes to School	Isaac Millman	The main character, Moses, uses ASL to communicate goes to a school for the Deaf.	5–8 yrs	2000
Zoo Keeper: Katy Is Deaf (Making It)	Eleanor Archer	The central character Katy is Profoundly Deaf and uses BSL to communicate. Based on a true story		2000
Elana's Ear, Or How I Became the Best Big Sister in the World	Gloria Roth Lowell, Karen Stormer Brooks	One of the main characters, Elana, the newborn baby is Deaf and wears hearing aids.		2000
	Monica Hughes, Julie Anderson	The illustrations show the main character, a young girl wearing a hearing aid on her right ear.	3–5 yrs	2000
A Screaming Kind of Day	Rachna Gilmore, Gordon Sauve	The main character, Scully, is deaf and wears hearing aids. This book won the 1999 Governor General's Literary Award for Children's Literature	6–7 yrs	1999
Dina the Deaf Dinosaur	Carole Addabbo Valentine	The central character, Dina, is Deaf and then learns sign language after she has run away from her hearing parents which don't know and won't learn sign language.		1997
Rosa's Parrot	Jan Wahl, Kim Howard	The central character Rosa struggles to hear speech without the help of her parrot that repeats phrases loudly.		1999
The Quiet World (Voyages Series)	Raewyn Caisley, Leanne Fleming	The main characters baby brother is born deaf. The main character wants to experience deafness for himself so stuffs his ears with cotton balls and wears headphones for a day, he thinks that his brother is going to be a football star.		1996
Cosmo Gets an Ear	Gary Clemente, Eugene Yelchin	The central character Cosmo gets hearing aids in the story.		1994
Dad and Me in the Morning	Patricia Lakin, Robert C. Steel	The central character is Deaf and he tells the story. He uses ASL and lip-reading to communicate.	4–8 yrs	1994
One TV Blasting and a Pig Outdoors	Deborah Abbott, Henry Kisor, Leslie Morrill	Written by Henry Kisor (Deaf after a period of illness aged three) and his wife (hearing) about the family dynamics where one parent has hearing loss. The father in the family went to a mainstream school and has excellent literacy skills and uses lip-reading and speech to communicate.	4–8 yrs	1994
Silent Observer	Inez MacKinnon, Christy MacKinnon	This book was compiled by Inez MacKinnon about Christy MacKinnon's childhood, Christy created the illustrations. Christy became Deaf after an illness aged two.		1993
The Spelling Window	Dawn L. Watkins	One of the main characters, Seth, is Deaf who communicates using speech and ASL.		1993
Mandy	Barbara D. Booth	The main character, Mandy, is Deaf and uses ASL and lip reading to communicate.	4–8 yrs	1991
A Picture Book of Helen Keller (Picture Book Biography)	David A. Adler, John Wallner, Alexandra Wallner	A picture book biography of Helen Keller's who was deaf-blind after an illness at aged 19 months.	4–8 yrs	1990
I'm Deaf and It's Okay	Lorraine Aseltine, Evelyn Mueller, Nancy Tait	The main character is Deaf; he signs and wears hearing aids and he meets an older Deaf child.	4+ yrs	1986
I Have a Sister. My Sister is Deaf	Jeanne Whitehouse Peterson	One of the main characters, Asian, is profoundly Deaf; he does not use hearing technology and uses lip-reading and gestures to communicate. This book was a Coretta Scott King Award Honor Book (1979) and a Reading Rainbow Selection Children's Books of 1977 (Library of Congress).	4–8 yrs	1984
Alan and the Baron	Ron Hamilton, Peggy B. Deal	The main character is a Deaf boy who uses sign language to communicate. Published by the National Association of the Deaf.		1983
Jamie's Tiger	Jan Wahl, Tomie dePaola	Jamie the central character becomes deaf after having German Measles.		1978
A Button in Her Ear (Concept book)	Ada Bassett Litchfield	The central character wears hearing aids with a body-worn box typical of the technology worn by deaf children in the 1970s.		1976

== Early Reader's Books with deaf characters ==
The books are listed in date order. Deaf authors and illustrators are highlighted in bold. Note the Emma Everyday series has UK editions without fingerspelling on the cover and American editions with ASL fingerspelling illustrations on the front covers.

Title	Author	Deaf characters	Child's age	Year 1st Published
The Big Bike (Emma Every Day)	**C L Reid**, Elena Aiello	Emma is Deaf and wears a cochlear implant. She uses speech and ASL or BSL (depending on the edition) to communicate depending on the situation and who she is communicating with. Early reader chapter book.	5–7 yrs	2023
The Writing Contest (Emma Every Day)	**C L Reid**, Elena Aiello	Emma is Deaf and wears a cochlear implant. She uses speech and ASL or BSL (depending on the edition) to communicate depending on the situation and who she is communicating with. Early reader chapter book.	5–7 yrs	2023
The Lemonade Stand (Emma Every Day)	**C L Reid**, Elena Aiello	Emma is Deaf and wears a cochlear implant. She uses speech and ASL or BSL (depending on the edition) to communicate depending on the situation and who she is communicating with. Early reader chapter book.	5–7 yrs	2022
Jazz and Pop's Adventure (Big Cat Phonics for Little Wondle Letters and Sounds Revised)	Tarnelia Matthews, **Lucy Rogers**	Jazz is deaf, wears hearing aids, and has a hearing dog to "listen out for the sounds I don't hear because I'm deaf." Phase 5 book.	6–7 yrs	2022
Roller skating Worries (Emma Every Day)	**C L Reid**, Elena Aiello	Emma is Deaf and wears a cochlear implant. She uses speech and ASL or BSL (depending on the edition) to communicate depending on the situation and who she is communicating with. Early reader chapter book.	5–7 yrs	2022
Dog Watch (Emma Every Day)	**C L Reid**, Elena Aiello	Emma is Deaf and wears a cochlear implant. She uses speech and ASL or BSL (depending on the edition) to communicate depending on the situation and who she is communicating with. Early reader chapter book.	5–7 yrs	2022
Swimming Struggle (Emma Every Day)	**C L Reid**, Elena Aiello	Emma is Deaf and wears a cochlear implant. She uses speech and ASL to communicate depending on the situation and who she is communicating with. Early reader chapter books.	5–7 yrs	2022
Friendship Goals (Emma Every Day)	**C L Reid**, Elena Aiello	Emma is Deaf and wears a cochlear implant. She uses speech and ASL or BSL (depending on the edition) to communicate depending on the situation and who she is communicating with. Early reader chapter book.	5–7 yrs	2021
A Trip to Grandma's (Emma Every Day)	**C L Reid**, Elena Aiello	Emma is Deaf and wears a cochlear implant. She uses speech and ASL or BSL (depending on the edition) to communicate depending on the situation and who she is communicating with. Early reader chapter book.	5–7 yrs	2021
The Boy in the Jam Jar	**Joyce Dunbar**, John Shelley	The central character, Dillan, experiences progressive hearing loss and wants things to go back to the way things were. Lime book band.	6–7 yrs	2020
Crazy for Apples (Emma Every Day)	**C L Reid**, Elena Aiello	Emma is Deaf and wears a cochlear implant. She uses speech and ASL or BSL (depending on the edition) to communicate depending on the situation and who she is communicating with. Early reader chapter book.	5–7 yrs	2020
Party Problems (Emma Every Day)	**C L Reid**, Elena Aiello	Emma is Deaf and wears a cochlear implant. She uses speech and ASL or BSL (depending on the edition) to communicate depending on the situation and who she is communicating with. Early reader chapter book.	5–7 yrs	2020
Tap Dance Troubles (Emma Every Day)	**C L Reid**, Elena Aiello	Emma is Deaf and wears a cochlear implant. She uses speech and ASL or BSL (depending on the edition) to communicate depending on the situation and who she is communicating with. Early reader chapter book.	5–7 yrs	2020
Going on a Field Trip (Emma Every Day)	**C L Reid**, Elena Aiello	Emma is Deaf and wears a cochlear implant. She uses speech and ASL or BSL (depending on the edition) to communicate depending on the situation and who she is communicating with. Early reader chapter book.	5–7 yrs	2020
I know Someone with a Hearing Impairment (understanding Health Issues)	Vic Parker		5–7 yrs	2012
The Den (Rigby star guided reading scheme) Red level	Monia Hughes, Julie Anderson	The illustrations show the main character who is a young girl wearing a hearing aid on her right ear building a de. There is one very simple sentence per page.	4–5 yrs	2007
I am Deaf (PM Science Facts)	Heather Hammond	The central character is a young Deaf boy who uses sign language (Auslan) to communicate, and attends a school for Deaf children.	5–7 yrs	2006

== Comics with deaf characters ==
The comics are listed in date order.

Comics with deaf characters
Title	Author / Illustrator	Deaf characters	Child's Age	Year 1st Published
Avatar Volume 3: The Cracks of My Carven	Juan Miguel Aguilera, Rafael Fonteriz	The central character Manuel Gomez is a police detective who was born "deaf mute". He communicates using special glasses.		2019
Iron Man: Sound Effects 2014 #1	Marvel Comics	It features Sapheara a superhero with bilateral pink cochlear implants and Superhero Blue Ear with two blue hearing aids. This comic was created in partnership with the Children's Hearing Institute.	8–11 yrs	2014
Avatar Volume 2: Claws in the Wind	Juan Miguel Aguilera, Rafael Fonteriz	The central character, Manuel Gomez, is a police detective who was born "deaf mute", he communicates using special glasses.		2009
New Averagers #27		Deaf superhero, Echo, was born Deaf and uses ASL, Indo-Pakistani Sign Language, art and performance and lip-reading to communicate.		2007
New Averagers #11		The book has Deaf superhero character, Ronin, (also known as Maya Lopez and Echo).		2005
Avatar Volume 1: A Look into Abyss	Juan Miguel Aguilera, Rafael Fonteriz	The central character, Manuel Gomez, is a police detective who was born "deaf mute"; he communicates using special glasses.		2003
Batman Beyond: Hear No Evil	Random House	The villain Shriek uses deafness as a shield and uses sound as a weapon.		2002
Daredevil issue 9	Marvel Comics	The superhero Echo was born Deaf and uses both ASL and a Native American system for communicating between tribes speaking different languages.		1999
Daredevil: Parts of a Hole Volume 2, #9-15		One of the characters, Maya Lopez, also called Echo & Ronin, is deaf and as she gets older becomes a part of the Deaf community. Echo was born Deaf and uses ASL, Indian Sign Language, art and performance and lip-reading to communicate.		2003
Daredevil: Echo - Vision Quest Volume 2, # 51–55		One of the characters, Maya Lopez, also called Echo & Ronin, is deaf and becomes part of the Deaf community. Echo uses ASL, Indian Sign Language, art and performance and lip-reading to communicate.		2004
The Listener	Elizabeth Laird, Pauline Hazelwood	One of the characters is deaf and helps when a neighbour is injured.		1997
Justice League of America #163	DC Comics	The Amazing Allergo (musician) loses his hearing which then causes him to become evil.		1970
Life With ARCHIE-The Sound of Silence #119		Archie the main character befriends a deaf character and teaches her to lipread.		1970?

== Graphic novels with deaf characters ==
The graphic novels are listed in date order.

Graphic novels with deaf characters
Title	Author	Deaf characters / Awards won	Child's age	Year 1st published
That Deaf Guy: A Wild Ride!	Matt Daigle	This comic book includes a series of comics featuring Desmond who is Deaf and uses ASL to communicate.		2014
El Deafo	Cece Bell	This loosely autobiographical book is about Cece who wore hearing aids at school and used lip-reading and speech to communicate. The book won the 2015 Eisner Award for Best Publication for Kids (ages 8–12) and a Newbery Honor in 2015.	8–12 yrs	2014
Annie Sullivan and the Trials of Helen Keller (The Center for Cartoon Studies Presents)	Joseph Lambert	This book is about the lives of Helen Keller (Deaf-Blind) and her teacher Annie Sullivan who was Blind.	10+ yrs	2012
Helen Keller: Courageous Advocate (Graphic Biographies)	Scott R. Welvaert, Cynthia Martin, Keith Tucker	This book is a biography of Helen Keller and her adult life advocating for the Blind community.	9–12 yrs	2006

== Middle grade books with deaf characters ==
The readers of these books are expected to be approximately between the ages of 8 and 12 years of age. Deaf authors names are highlighted in Bold. The books are listed in date order.

Title	Author	Deaf characters / Awards won	Readers Age	Topics, Themes	Year 1st Published
Make a Little Wave	Kerry O'Malley Cerra	A deaf girl who hears with the help of cochlear implants becomes an accidental activist when she learns about the horrific act of shark finning. This book won a Florida Book Award and was named an Honor Book for the National Green Earth Book Award	8-14 yrs	deafness, activism, conservation, environmentalism, sharks, shark finning	2024
Hear Me	**Kerry O'Malley Cerra**	This #ownvoices contemporary middle-grade novel follows 12-year-old Rayne who, at odds with her parents over her sudden hearing loss and looming cochlear implant surgery, sets off on a journey where she discovers that even though her ears may be broken, she is not. Written in first person point of view, the author uses *** to denote words the main character cannot hear, effectively putting the readers into her shoes.	8–14 yrs	hearing loss, cochlear implants, having a say in your medical decisions	2022
Lizzie & Lucky: The Mystery of the Missing Dog	**Megan Rix,** Tim Budgen	The central character, Lizzie (eight) is deaf. In the book she lives at home with her deaf parents, they all wear colourful bilateral hearing aids and at-home use BSL to communicate. Accessibility is gently addressed when the characters experience communication difficulties such as trying to lip-read in the dark, when people don't speak clearly or turn away mid-sentence and not everyone uses or understands BSL. They make a video relay call to the police through a BSL interpreter.	6–8 yrs	Dog lovers, Detective	2021
Lizzie & Lucky: The Mystery of the Missing Puppies	**Megan Rix,** Tim Budgen	The central character, Lizzie (eight), is deaf. She lives at home with her deaf parents. They all wear colourful bilateral hearing aids and at home use BSL to communicate.	6–8 yrs	Dog lovers, Detective	2021
Normal: One Kid's Extraordinary Journey	Magdalena Newman, **Nathaniel Newman** Treacher Collins syndrome and has had 67 operations for him to be able to breathe, eat and hear better. He wears BAHA hearing aids. This book is co-written with his mother and includes graphic information on his treatment.	10–14 yrs	Treacher Collins syndrome Autobiography	2020	
Now Hear This: Harper soars with her magic ears	Valli Gideons, **Harper Gideons**, Priscila Soares	The central character, Harper, has one cochlear implant and one hearing aid. It discusses different communication methods including speech and ASL and different hearing technology including Baha hearing aids,	7–12 yrs	Deaf awareness	2020
TURBO Racers: Escape Velocity	Austin Aslan	The central character is a 12-year-old CODA. Both his parents are Deaf ASL users. He is fluent in ASL.	8–12 yrs	Racing	2020
Harriet Versus the Galaxy	**Samantha Baines**	The central character, Harriet (10), wears hearing aids and uses speech to communicate. When she finds herself defending the human race against extra-terrestrial characters with her Gran she discovers that her hearing aids as well as amplifying sound can also tune into the wavelength of many languages. There is a non-binary character called Robin also in the book. Harriet lives with her grandmother while her father is away driving lorries and there is no mention of her mother. The book has many black and white illustrations.	7–11 yrs	Space adventure	2019
Joss: Touch the Sky - Book 2 (Girl of the Year 2020)	Erin Falligant, Maike Plenzke	This book is made by the company American Girl and a matching doll is also available. The main character Joss (10) was born profoundly deaf in her left ear and some hearing in her right ear. She wears a hearing aid on her right ear (sometimes with a headband). She predominately uses speech to communicate at school but her mother uses ASL when communicating with her and her friends and brother sign to her when she isn't wearing her hearing aid (e.g. when she is on the beach). She takes her hearing aid out for some activities such as surfing and uses an FM system at the cheerleading gym. She requests that her friends face her when speaking to her and sit on her right side and sometimes she needs to ask them to repeat themselves etc.	8–10 yrs	Friendship, Surfing And Family	2019
Joss - Book 1 (Girl of the Year 2020)	Erin Falligant Maike Plenzke	This book is made by the company American Girl and so a matching doll is also available. The main character Joss (10) was born profoundly deaf in her left ear and some hearing in her right ear. She wears a hearing aid on her right ear (sometimes with a headband). She predominately uses speech to communicate at school but her mother uses ASL when communicating with her and her friends and brother sign to her when she isn't wearing her hearing aid e.g. when she's on the beach. She takes her hearing aid out for some activities such as surfing and uses an FM system at the cheerleading gym. She requests that her friends face her when speaking to her and sit on her right side and sometimes she needs to ask them to repeat themselves etc.	8–10 yrs	Friendship, Surfing and Family	2019
Toad Attack!	Patrice Lawrence, Becka Moor	Rosa is one of the two main characters wears a hearing aid and uses sign language and lip-reading to communicate. She has two fathers. This book has a dyslexia-friendly layout.	8–10 yrs	Mystery, Friendship	2019
The Sound of Silence, Growing up with Deaf parents	Myron Uhlberg	This book is an adaptation of Myron Uhlberg's memoir 'Hands of My Father' containing details of his childhood as the hearing son of Deaf parents.	9–12 yrs	Autobiography	2019
TURBO Racers: Trailblazer	Austin Aslan	The central character is a 12-year-old CODA. Both his parents are Deaf ASL users. He is fluent in ASL.	8–12 yrs	Racing	2018
You Don't Know Everything, Jilly P!	Alex Gino	The central character is a 12-year-old girl and her parents have a baby, Emma, who is born deaf. The book includes their initial feelings of grief and consultations with professionals where they are encouraged to consider a CI and not to use gestures or ASL with their baby. The main Deaf character is Derek who uses ASL as his first language and is Black. He attends California School for the Deaf. There are several other Deaf characters in the story.	8–12 yrs	Racism & Attitudes towards difference including Deafness.	2018
Diary of a Hard of Hearing Kid	Isaiah John Baier	This memoir is written by 11-year-old Isaiah, he became deaf after having meningitis at 20 months olds and wears a hearing aid on one ear, has a cochlear implant on the other side and uses speech when communicating.	8+ yrs	Humorous / autobiographical 11-year-old's diary	2018
Left Out	Tim Green	The central character, Landon (12), is Deaf and has cochlear implants and uses speech to communicate.	8–12 yrs	Sports fiction - American Football	2017
Macy McMillan and the Rainbow Goddess	Shari Green	The central character, Macy (12), is Deaf and uses ASL to communicate as well as note writing. This book won the ALA Schneider Family Book Award, for Middle Grade Books in 2018 and has been shortlisted for many other awards.	8–12 yrs	Friendships & family life	2017
Echo Comes Home	Megan Rix	The central character, Jake (11), became deaf after having meningitis as a younger child. He attends a mainstream school and wears hearing aids and uses lip reading and ASL to communicate better. He is lonely and longs for a hearing dog.	9–11 yrs	Animal lovers	2016
Feel the Sound	Evangeline Duran Fuentes	One of the main characters, Jake (12), became deaf after having meningitis. He uses ASL to communicate with his mother and he is teaching two friends ASL. He does not wear hearing aids.	9–12 yrs	Friendships and relationships	2015
Destiny And Faith Get Stuck In The Country (Destiny and Faith series)	Teddy O'Malley, Angie Dickens	One of the characters, Dustin, is Deaf and uses ASL to communicate. There is another character called Cissy who is blind.	6-9 yrs	Friendship and Adventure	2015
Silence in the Wild: A Summer in Maine	Dale C. Jellison	The central character, Jake (12), wears a hearing aid. He loses his hearing aid when he is left alone in a remote area.	7–12 yrs	Friendship and Adventure Set in 1986 American Camp	2014
Destiny and Faith Go To Twincentric Academy! (Destiny and Faith series)	Teddy O'Malley, Angie Dickens	One of the characters, Dustin, is Deaf and uses ASL to communicate.	6-9 yrs	Friendship and Adventure	2014
Destiny And Faith's Summer Adventures (Destiny and Faith series #2)	Teddy O'Malley, Angie Dickens	One of the characters, Dustin, is Deaf and uses ASL to communicate, other characters sign fluently despite never meeting a Deaf person before.	6-9 yrs	Friendship and Adventure	2014
Wonder	R. J. Palacio	The central character August (10) has Treacher Collins syndrome and has had 27 surgeries to correct his craniofacial anomalies. He also wears BAHA hearing aids. In the book, he starts attending the local mainstream school where he is bullied. This book is written from a variety of perspectives and is required reading for 4–5 graders at schools across the US. The book was made into a film where August still has the craniofacial syndrome but no longer has hearing loss so does not wear BAHA hearing aids. The book is a New York Times bestseller and is on Time Magazine's 100 Best Young Adult Books of All Time and on the Publishers Weekly and Kirkus Reviews List of Best of Children's Books, amongst many others.	8–12 yrs	Learning to accept others	2012
The Salt-Stained Book (Strong Winds Trilogy #1)	Julia Jones, Claudia Myatt	The main character Donny (13) is a CODA, his mother, Skye, is profoundly deaf and dyslexic and uses BSL to communicate.	9+ yrs	Sailing	2011
A Ravelled Flag(Strong Winds Trilogy #2)	Julia Jones, Claudia Myatt	The main character Donny (14) is a CODA. His mother, Skye, is Profoundly Deaf and dyslexic and uses BSL to communicate.	9+ yrs	Sailing	2011
Young Thomas Edison	Sterling North	This book is a biography of Thomas Edison. He became deaf at approximately 8–12 years of age. Study notes	5–11 yrs	American History	2009
Mask of the Jackal	Christine Harris	One of the main characters, Jordy, is deaf and uses Auslan to communicate.	9–12 yrs	Thriller	2008
Rally Caps	Stephen Culter, Jodi Cutler	One of the main characters in the book, Luca (10ish), is Deaf and has a cochlear implant.	8–12 yrs	Sports Fiction -Baseball	2007
The Smart Princess and Other Deaf Tales	**Keelin Carey Kristina Guevremont**, **Nicole Marsh**	This collection of short stories written by Canadian Deaf children, the book includes several different Deaf characters, including Deaf friends, sign language and an adult who discourages sign language.	8–12 yrs	Friendships And Deaf identity	2007
Changes for Julie 1974 (American Girl: Julie #6)	Megan McDonald	One of the main characters Joy (nine) is deaf and uses lip-reading, ASL and unclear speech to communicate while attending the local mainstream school.	8+ yrs	Set in 1970s America	2007
Feathers	Jacqueline Woodson	The central characters brother is a Deaf ASL user called Sean, he is also a Black African-American. This book won a Newbery Honor in 2008.	9–12 yrs	Set in the 1970s / race / region and understanding difference	2007
Nobody's Perfect (Deaf Child Crossing #2)	**Marlee Matlin**	The central character, Megan (nine), is Deaf and an ASL user. She attends a mainstream school and has a Sign language interpreter with her at School. A secondary character Justin is autistic and Megan teaches him some ASL.	8–12 yrs	Friendship	2007
Deaf Culture Fairy Tales	**Roz Rosen**, Yiqiao Wang	This collection of 20 adapted classic short stories e.g. Beauty and the Beast. Each story has been adapted to include Deaf characters or characters who sign in ASL. Some characters are "mute" and other have speech lessons.	?	Deaf culture / ASL Fairy tales	2007
Leading Ladies (Deaf Child Crossing #3)	**Marlee Matlin**	The central character, Megan (nine), is Deaf ASL user and she attends a mainstream school and has a Sign language interpreter with her at School. Lizzie (9), her best friend from camp, transfers to her School and is a main character. She is Deaf and an ASL user too.	8–12 yrs	Friendship / sign language	2007
Singing Hands	Delia Ray	The central character, Gussie (12), is one of three hearing children born to a Deaf Couple CODA. Her father, Reverend Davis is Deaf as is her mother. They are both ASL users. In the story, she takes part in a trip with Alabama School for the Deaf. As the book is set in the Deaf community there are several other Deaf characters including Abe a Black Deaf child who attends Alabama School for the Deaf. The book is partially based on the author's mother's CODA experience. This book was a Book Sense Summer 2006 Children's Pick, A 2007 Notable Children's Trade Book in the Field of Social Studies, Named to the 2007 Bank Street Best Children's Books of the Year List and a Kansas’ William Allen White Award Nominee, 2008–09.	10–14 yrs	Set in America in the 1940s / Racism	2006
Smart Princess: And Other Deaf Tales	Canadian Cultural Society of the Deaf	This compilation of five short stories was written by Deaf young people and Deaf young adults who won the Ladder Awards competition. This collection of five short stories feature a range of Deaf characters. including a young princess Lyla who would one day be queen, and how she runs away from her Aunt Belle, who refuses to learn sign language. In another story, a Deaf child is teased in her mainstream school for being Deaf until she moves to the Newfoundland School for the Deaf. The group of Deaf and hearing astronauts end up on a planet where hearing people have special needs.	7-9 yrs		2005
Teamwork at Camp Tiago (Keystone Stables #4)	Marsha Hulber	One of the main characters, Jonathan, is Deaf and uses ASL to communicate. The book is set on an American special needs Summer camp and one of the other main characters lives in foster care and has completed a crash course in ASL so can communicate with Jonathon. This book contains a Christian message. This book was reprinted in 2009 under the new title Summer Camp Adventures.	9–12 yrs	Foster care, Horse care, Animal Lovers	2005 (reprinted in 2009)
Helen Keller: A photographic story of a life	Leslie Garrett, Annie Tremmel Wilcox	This book is a biography of Helen Keller, who became Deaf-Blind at 19 months old after an illness. She initially was taught through a manual alphabet and then learned to speak and 'read lip' through touching the speaker's lips. She was also proficient in braille.	10–14 yrs	Biography America 1980s onwards	2004
Deaf Child Crossing (Deaf Child Crossing #1)	**Marlee Matlin**	The main character, Megan (10), is Deaf and uses ASL and "voice that sounded different to others" to communicate. One of her friends learns some ASL.	8–12 yrs	Friendship	2004
Who was Helen Keller	Gare Thompson, Nancy Harrison	This is a biography of Helen Keller. Part of a #1 New York Times bestselling series.	8–12 yrs	Biography America 1980s onwards	2003
Amelia Lends a Hand (Amelia's Notebooks #12)	Marissa Moss	One of the main characters, Enzo, is Deaf and uses ASL to communicate. He doesn't hear the main character when she calls to him, but he later teaches her ASL. Journal style Book, it contains plenty of doodle style pictures. Printed by American Girl.	9–12 yrs	Friendship	2002
Deafness (Living with)	Emma Haughton	This book factual approaches deafness through looking at the lives of a group of deaf children and one deaf adult; it discusses BSL different levels of hearing loss, technology and its limitations and touches on BSL, though deaf culture isn't really discussed fully.	10–12 yrs	Deaf children	2002
The Mystery of the Totems (Flying Fingers Club Book 5/5)	Jean F. Andrews	One of the two main characters is a boy called Matt who is Deaf and uses ASL to communicate.	8–12 yrs	Friendship & Detective group	2001
Super-Tuned!	Heather Hammonds	The central character, Nick, has hearing aids and uses speech and lip-reading to communicate. His hearing aid tunes into a boat in distress.	5-9 yrs	Rescues	2001
River of Hands	**Shron Kirsh**	This collection of four short stories by young Deaf authors and illustrators includes Deaf character in each story and references to sign language. The contributors have all won the ladder awards. A project of Canadian Cultural Society of the Deaf	7–11 yrs	Short stories	2000
Doggy Dare (Animal Ark Pets #12)	Ben M. Baglio (pseudonym Lucy Daniels)	One of the main characters, Joey, is deaf and isn't allowed much dependence by his mother so some children train a stray dog to be a hearing dog so they can keep him. The books originally were published in England, under the pseudonym Lucy Daniels in 1988.)	6–8 yrs	Animal lovers	2000
Nick's Secret (Nick's Mission #2)	**Claire H. Blatchford**	The central character, Nick (14), became Deaf aged six after having meningitis and communicates using lip-reading and speech. He has regular speech therapy sessions and attends a mainstream school.	9–12 yrs	Children's Mystery series	2000
Dovey Coe	Frances O'Roark Dowell	One of the main characters, Amos (13), is deaf and uses ASL to communicate with the dogs. He goes on to become a sign language teacher as an adult. The main character is accused of murder. This book won the William Allen White Children's Book Award (2013) and Edgar Award, Best Children's (2001).	10–12 yrs	Historical Mystery set in the 1920s America	2000
Can You Feel the Thunder	Lynn E. McElfresh	One of the main characters, Stephanie, is DeafBlind. The book is told from her younger brother's (13) perspective and his mixed feelings about his older DeafBlind sister. She uses touch and tactile signed manual alphabet to communicate.	9–14 years	Accepting a family member	1999
Dangerous Games (The Wolves Chronicles #5)	Joan Aiken MBE	The Islands King is Deaf. This book is also published in the UK under the title Limbo Lodge.	12–15 yrs	Fantasy historical fiction	1999
Going with the Flow	**Claire Blatchford**	The central character, Mark (11), is the only deaf child in his mainstream school. He became deaf after having meningitis aged three, he wears hearing aids and has an ASL interpreter in class with him.	8–10 yrs	Friendship, anger and loneliness	1998
Hannie	Barbara Luetke-Stahlman	Two of the main characters are Deaf sisters. Based on a true story and written by Hannah's mother.	11 yrs	Deaf siblings	1996
Tuck Triumphant (Tuck #2)	Theodore Taylor	One of the main characters, Chok-do wo, is adopted and is from Korea. He is referred to as "deaf-mute". The dog Tuck is blind.	9+ yrs	Adoption Friendship	1996
Gaps in Stone Walls	John Neufield	The central character, Merry (12), is Deaf and uses sign language to communicate. This book is set in Chilmark Martha's Vineyard in the 1880s, where at least a fifth of the population had hereditary deafness so sign language was widely used by Deaf and hearing people across island life. So the book contains a range of characters who sign, some Deaf, some hearing.	10–14 yrs	Murder mystery	1996
The Deadly Chase (The Colonial Captives #2)	Angela Elwell Hunt	The book lightly touches on the history of slave trading and is set on a transatlantic boat filled with children soon to be sold into slavery. One of the characters is a deaf girl who tries to save a baby whale. This book also has a religious theme: a Jewish boy accepts Christ and becomes a Christian.	10–13 yrs	Historical fiction set in 1627	1996
Cheshire Moon	Nancy Butts	The central character, Miranda (13), is Deaf and uses ASL, lipreading and speech to communicate. Her parents insist that she speaks instead of signing.	10+ yrs	Fantasy	1996
Signs in Success Profiles of Deaf Americans	Ron Podmore	This book is the biographies of five Deaf Americans including Marlee Matlin and the first Deaf president of Gallaudet University, I. King Jordan.	8+ yrs	Biography	1995
Deaf Communities A Worldwide Perspective	Jack Olson	This books explorers Deaf experiences in different countries.	11–13 yrs	Deaf culture	1995
Thanks A Lot!	Lucille Kraiman	The central character, Jordan, is moved from a School for the Deaf, where sign language is used, to a mainstream school where a deaf student cannot sign and must use speech to communicate.	8–18 yrs	Friendship	1995
Nick's Mission (Nick's Mission #1)	**Claire H. Blatchford**	The central character, Nick (13), became Deaf aged six after having meningitis and communicates using lip-reading and speech. He has regular speech therapy sessions and attends a mainstream school.	9–12 yrs	Children's mystery series	1994
The Ghost of Tomahawk Creek (Flying Fingers Club 4/5)	Jean F. Andrews	One of the two main characters is a boy called Matt who is Deaf and uses ASL to communicate.	9–12 yrs	Friendship & detective group	1993
Laurent Clerc: The Story of His Early Years	Cathryn Carroll, Harlan L. Lane	This fictionalised autobiography of Laurent Cleric covers his early life as a Deaf student in France and then how he came to co-found the first School for the Deaf in North America and develop new teaching methods including the use of ASL. Published by Gallaudet University Press.		American Deaf History	1991, reprinted in 2002
Hasta Luego, San Diego (Flying Fingers Club Book 3/5)	Jean F. Andrews	One of the two main characters is Matt, who is Deaf and uses ASL to communicate. Printed by Gallaudet University Press.	8–12 yrs	Friendship & detective group	1991
Secret in the Dorm Attic, The (Flying Fingers Club Book 2/5)	Jean F. Andrews	One of the two main characters is Matt, who is Deaf and uses ASL to communicate. This book is set in Matt's residential Deaf school and includes other Deaf characters. Printed by Gallaudet University Press.	9–12 yrs	Friendship & detective group	1990
Jessi's Secret Language (The Baby-Sitters Club #16)	Ann M. Martin	One of the main characters Matt (a young child) was born Deaf; he uses ASL to communicate. He teaches ASL to his babysitter and other interested children ASL.	8–12 yrs	Friendships	1988
The Flying Fingers Club (The Flying Fingers Club Book 1/5)	Jean F. Andrews	One of the main characters, Matt, is Deaf and uses ASL to communicate. He teaches the central character Donald, who has a learning disability, to sign in ASL. Gallaudet University Press.	9–12 yrs	Friendship & detective group	1988
All Alone (Except for My Dog Friday)	**Claire Blatchford**	The central character, Margret (12), is deaf and she is sure that no-one understands what it's like to be deaf apart from the dog.	9–12 yrs	Isolation & Animals	1983
Hero	Christina Bridges	One of the two main characters, Jacob, is Deaf. His ability to read lips makes him the 'hero' of the story.	7–12 yrs	Friendship & detective story	1982
Apple is my sign	Troy Howell, Mary Riskind	The central character, Harry (10), is Deaf and is sent the residential Mr Bertie's School for the Deaf, in Philadelphia. His family are Deaf and sign ASL discreetly in public. His family live on an Apple farm so his Sign name is Apple. The book is set at the residential Deaf School where he meets other Deaf children including Landis whose parents encourage him to speak and lipread.	10–12 yrs	Set in 1899, Adventure	1981 republished in 1993
Child of the Silent Night	Edith Fisher Hunter, Bea Holmes	This book is based on the true story of Laura Bridgman who became deaf-blind and lost her sense of smell/taste aged two after an illness (possibly scarlet fever). She could read Braille and used tactile sign language to communicate. She spent most of her school and adult life at the Perkins Institution for the Blind. She was born 50 years before Helen Keller.	9–12 yrs	A slightly fictionalised account of Laura Bridgman's life, 1829–1889	1963, reprinted in 1971

== Young Adult books with deaf characters ==
The readers of these books are intended to be between 13 and 18. The books are in date order.

33YA books with deaf characters
Title	Author	Deaf Characters / Awards Won	Target Age	Gerne	Year First Published
Impossible Music	Sean Williams,	The central character, Simon (18), becomes Profoundly Deaf after a stroke aged 18. Initially he communicates through text messages and written messages and is reluctant to learn Auslan. Another main character, "G", also known as George, has recently become deaf and she also has tinnitus.	14+ yrs	YA Relationships And Music	2019
This Is Kind of an Epic Love Story	Kacen Callender	One of the main characters, Ollie (16), is deaf and in a Gay relationship. He uses ASL or written English to communicate. He is surrounded by hearing characters who use some ASL to communicate with him. This book was nominated for the Lambda Literary Award for LGBTQ Children's/Young Adult (2019).	14–18 yrs	YA Romance / LGBTQ	2018
Opal (The Raven Cycle #4.5)	Maggie Stiefvater	One of the main characters, Adam, is deaf in his left ear.	13+ yrs	YA Fantasy	2018
27 Hours (The Nightside Saga #1)	Tristina Wright	One of the main characters, Nyx, is deaf and uses ASL to communicate. He has Cuban ancestry and is pansexual.		YA Science Fiction	2017
Begin, End, Begin: A #LoveOzYA Anthology	Danielle Binks, Amie Kaufman, Melissa Keil, Will Kostakis, Ellie Marney, Jaclyn Moriarty, Michael Pryor, Alice Pung, Gabrielle Tozer, Lili Wilkinson	This collection of short stories includes Last Night at the Mount Solemn Observatory by Danielle Binks, which has a deaf character called King (18) who uses Auslan to communicate. This Anthology won the Australian Book Industry Award (ABIA) for Older Children Age 13+ (2018.) Teacher notes are available.	14+ yrs		2017
Smelly Hearing Aids and Fishy Lips: a deaf teenager's journal	Marc Heyez	The central character, Egg (17), is a teenage deaf boy "living in a hearing society" who uses lip-reading, hearing aids and speech to communicate. He has speech lessons in the book.	14–18 yrs	Set in 1983 Canada Comedy / Fiction	2017
You're Welcome, Universe	Whitney Gardner	The central character, Julia, is Deaf and has two Deaf mothers, is of Indian descent and uses ASL, lip-reading and written English to communicate. She first attends Kingston School for the Deaf and then attends a mainstream school. Her friend, Jordyn, is also deaf, has a cochlear implant and uses both her voice and ASL to communicate. Winner of the Schneider Family Book Award for teenagers in 2018. and Official Selection, Bank Street College Best Children's Book of the Year and Official selection, Tayshas Reading List.	14+ yrs	YA Realistic Fiction / Art	2017
Being Jazmine (Invisible book 3)	Cecil Paterson	The central character, Jazmine (14), starts by wearing hearing aids but stops wearing them and develops friendships with Deaf Auslan users. She attends deaf camp where she makes friends with many Deaf Auslan users.	13-16 yrs	YA Friendships And Deaf Identity	2017
A Quiet Kind of Thunder	Sara Barnard	One of the two main characters, Rhys, is Deaf and uses BSL to communicate. The other main character Steffi has been a selective mute for much of her life and the characters use BSL to communicate with each other.		Romance / Mental Health	2017
Tone Deaf	Olivia Rivers	The main character, Ali Collins, is 17 and became Deaf at the age of 10 following a brain tumour. She uses lip-reading, speech and ASL to communicate.		YA Romance, Music	2016
The Ghost Rebellion (A Ministry of Peculiar Occurrences Novel #5)	Pip Ballantine, Tee Morris, Philippa Ballantine	One of the characters is deaf and uses sign language. They are an active operative of the Ministry.		Science Fiction, Steampunk	2016
The Raven King (The Raven Cycle #4)	Maggie Stiefvater	One of the main characters, Adam, is deaf in his left ear. This book was a Mythopoeic Fantasy Award Nominee for Adult Literature (2017) and Goodreads Choice Award Nominee for Young Adult Fantasy & Science Fiction (2016).		YA Fantasy	2016
Talk Under Water	Kathryn Lomer	One of the two main characters, Summer (16), has been deaf since birth and uses Auslan and written English to communicate. In the story, one of the other main characters learns Auslan.		YA Romance & Family	2015
There Will Be Lies	Nick Lake	One of the main characters, Shelby (17), is profoundly deaf and uses lip-reading and ASL to communicate.		YA Mystery / Fantasy	2015
Song of Summer	Laura Lee Anderson	One of the two central characters is Carter, who is Profoundly Deaf and was adopted by a family which are part of the New York Deaf community. His father is Deaf, his mother a housewife and an ASL interpreter and his sister (nine) has a cochlear implant which works well. Carter has had unsuccessful cochlear implant surgery and uses ASL to communicate. He often feels left out of the conversation when with hearing people. One of the main characters learns ASL in the book.	12+ yrs	YA Music / Romance	2015
Silence	Deborah Lytton	One of the two main characters, Stella (15), becomes deaf after a head injury which takes place during the book. She uses speech to communicate and gets a cochlear implant. The other main character Hayden has a stutter. Described as a Clean Romance Book. Both the main characters have "damaged childhoods".	12+ yrs	YA Romance	2015
A Handful of Spells	Kimberley A. Shaw	The central character, Caitlin, is deaf and uses speech and lip-reading to communicate. She goes to the school for witches, and there are attempts to assist her hearing using magi—the effect is similar to wearing hearing aids and does not cure or completely restore her hearing, as she still has many misunderstandings.		YA Fantasy	2014
Flying to the Fire (Flying #2)	Elyse Salpeter	One of the two main characters, Danny (13), is Deaf and uses ASL to communicate combined with some lip-reading and speech.		YA Action / Thriller / Afterlife	2014
Waiting for a Sign	Esty Schachter	One of the main characters, Ian (17) is Deaf and uses lip-reading and ASL to communicate. He attends Hawthorne School for the Deaf. The central character is his hearing sister and she is a fluent ASL signer. The book explores the relationships within families when one member is Deaf.	12+ yrs	YA Fiction Deaf culture	2014
Blue Lily, Lily Blue (The Raven Cycle #3)	Maggie Stiefvater	One of the main characters, Adam (17-18), is deaf in his left ear. Adam is bisexual. This book has been nominated for these awards, Locus Award Nominee for Best Young Adult Novel (2015), Mythopoeic Fantasy Award Nominee for Adult Literature (2017), Goodreads Choice Award Nominee for Young Adult Fantasy & Science Fiction (2014).	14+ yrs	YA Fantasy / Paranormal / LGBTQ	2014
Invisible (Book 1)	Cecil Paterson	The central character Jazmine aged 12, sometimes wears a hearing aid and uses lip-reading and speech to communicate. This book was a semi-finalist in the Amazon Breakthrough novel award in 2014.	10-17 yrs	YA Romance	2014
Invincible (Invisible book 2)	Cecil Paterson	The central character, Jazmine (13), sometimes wears a hearing aid and uses lip-reading and speech to communicate.	9-16 yrs	YA	2014
The Fifth Vertex (The Sigilord Chronicles #1)	Kevin Hoffman	The central character, Urus, was born Deaf and uses sign language to communicate. The book started with him attempting to commit suicide; he later becomes the hero of the story with his magical powers, which develop as a result of his suicide attempt.		YA Fantasy	2014
The Dream Thieves (The Raven Cycle #2)	Maggie Stiefvater	One of the main characters, Adam, is Deaf in his left ear and is in a homosexual relationship. This book has been nominated for several awards including the Locus Award Nominee for Best Young Adult Novel (2014), Mythopoeic Fantasy Award Nominee for Adult Literature (2017), Milwaukee County Teen Book Award Nominee (2015), Goodreads Choice Award Nominee for Young Adult Fantasy & Science Fiction (2013).		YA Fantasy	2013
Sounds of Silence	Phillip Tomasso III	The central character, Marco, becomes deaf aged 12 after being ill with meningitis. He attends a residential Deaf School while learning ASL.		YA Fiction	2013
My Haunting Love	J. S. Wilsoncroft	The central character, Calista (16), is deaf and starts the book by leaving the school for the Deaf she attends to go to a mainstream school. She uses ASL to communicates and so does the Ghost in the story.		YA Ghost	2013
Dragonswood (Wilde Island Chronicles #2)	Janet Lee Carey	The central character, Tess (17), is deaf in one ear which is swollen and cauliflower-shaped as a consequence of repeatedly being beaten by her father. The book is set in the Middle Ages.		YA Fantasy	2012
Goodbye Tchaikovsky	Michael Thal	The central character, David (12), is a violist and suddenly becomes profoundly deaf. In the story, he learns ASL and lip-reading.	8+ yrs	YA Music	2012
The Raven Boys (The Raven Cycle #1)	Maggie Stiefvater	One of the main characters, Adam, is Deaf in his left ear. This book has been nominated for several awards including Bram Stoker Award Nominee for Best Young Adult Novel (2012), Mythopoeic Fantasy Award Nominee for Adult Literature (2017), Rhode Island Teen Book Award Nominee (2015), Milwaukee County Teen Book Award Nominee (2014), The Inky Awards for Silver Inky (2013).		YA Fantasy	2012
Invincible Summer	Hannah Moskowitz	One of the main characters, Gideon, was born deaf and uses a form of sign language to communicate.		YA Romance	2011
Whisper	Chrisse Keighery	The central character, Demi (16), became profoundly deaf when she had meningitis aged 14. She uses lip-reading, speech and Auslan to communicate. She attends a college for the Deaf and has a Deaf friend called Stella who uses Auslan to communicate and is proud to be Deaf.		YA Romance	2011
Wonderstruck	Brian Selznick	Both the main characters are Deaf: Ben was born deaf in his left ear then becomes profoundly deaf after being hit by lightning. He uses speech and written English to communicate. Rose is born Deaf and communicates using ASL and some lipreading and speech. The story is told in pictures when telling Rose's story. This book won the Schneider Family Book Award - Middle School Winner 2012. It was made into a film in 2017 called Wonderstruck.		YA Fiction	2011
Five Flavors of Dumb	Antony John	This book's main character is Piper who is Deaf and uses ASL to communicate. The family has a hereditary deafness and her new baby sister is born deaf and has a cochlear implant fitted. Winner of a 2011 Schneider Family Book Award.	12+ yrs	YA Romance / Music	2010
Freak City	Kathrin Schrockle	One of the two main characters, Leah, is deaf from birth and uses speech, lipreading and sign language to communicate. This book has been translated from German by Tammi Reichel and in 2019 a film based on the book was to be launched entitled Freak City.		YA Romance	2010 Reprinted in 2014
The Dark Days of Hamburger Halpin	Josh Berk	The central character, Will, transfers from a Deaf School to a mainstream school and uses lip-reading and sign language to communicate.		YA Fiction	2010
T4: A Novel in Verse	Ann Clare Lezotte	The central character, Paula (13), is Deaf from an early age and used gestures to communicate before learning sign language in the book. The T4 program aimed to sterilize and/or kill thousands of Jews with disabilities.	12+ yrs	Set in Nazis Germany	2008
Read My Lips	Teri Brown	The central character, Serena, is deaf and wears hearing aids and uses lip-reading and speech to communicate. Reading lips sometimes causes some confusion.		YA Romance	2008
At Face Value	Emily Franklin	The central character is taught ASL by Linus who is a hearing child of Deaf parents or a CODA.	12+ yrs	YA Romance	2008
The King Commands: (Tales of the Borderlands #2)	Meg Burden	The Deaf character Finn has a more prominent role in this book. He uses sign language to communicate with his family and also occasionally uses lip reading and telepathy as many of the other characters in the book are also telepathic.	11–15 years	YA Fantasy	2008
The White Darkness	Geraldine McCaughrean	The central character, Sym (14), is deaf, she wears hearing aids and uses speech and lip-reading to communicate. This book was a Michael L. Printz award winner (2008) and Whitbread Children's Book Award (2005).		YA Adventure	2008
Northlander (Tales of the Borderlands #1)	Meg Burden	One of the characters is called Finn. He is Deaf and uses Sign Language to communicate with his family and occasionally uses lip reading and telepathy as many of the other characters in the book are also telepathic. This book was awarded Book of the Year, YA Fiction by ForeWord Magazine and International Reading Association Notable Book.	12+ yrs	YA Fantasy	2007
Hurt Go Happy	Ginny Rorby	The central character, Joey (13), became deaf when she was six years old following abuse and wears hearing aids and uses speech and lip-reading (with limited success) to communicate. Her mother doesn't let her learn to sign but in the story she learns ASL. This book has won the Schneider Family Book Award for Teen Book (2008) and was a Missouri Truman Readers Award Nominee (2009.)	12+ yrs	YA Realistic Fiction/ Animal testing, rights	2006
Dr Sylver and the Repository of the Past (The Sylver Chronicles #2)	Paul Kercal	One of the main characters, Charlotte, is deaf, she attends a mainstream school.	12-16 yrs	YA Christian novel, teenage pregnancy, depression and self harm	2006
Dr Sylver and the Library of Everything (The Sylver Chronicles #1)	Paul Kercal	One of the main characters, Charlotte, is deaf and attends a mainstream school.	12-16 yrs	YA Christian novel, bullying	2004
The Raging Quiet	Sherryl Jordan	This book is set in medieval times. One of the main characters, Raven, is deaf. He is frequently misunderstood but does develop a signed/gestural communication system with one of the other characters.	12–14 yrs	YA Historical Romantic Fiction	2004
Of Sound Mind	Jean Ferris	The central character, Theo, is a CODA and is bilingual in English and ASL. He is the only hearing person in his family and his brother and his parents are Deaf and communicate using ASL. There is another CODA in the book called Ivy.	12-17 yrs		2004
Read My Lips	Jana Novotny Hunter	The central character, Cat (teenager), became Profoundly deaf after having meningitis when she was five. In the story, she had learnt to speak before she lost her hearing but as she now lives in a residential Deaf school she no longer uses her voice. The students at the Deaf School are divided—some use spoken English to communicate, others use sign language. Cat's best friend is a Deaf sign language user. There is also another main character Joey who has transferred from another school and uses a total communication approach (speech and sign similarly). In the book, there is a school debate on speaking vs. signing vs. total communication. The writer has two profoundly deaf siblings were and hearing parents.	12–14 yrs	Romance	2002
Finding Abby	Virginia M. Scott	One of the main characters, Abby, becomes deaf aged 14 after meningitis and dies aged 16. The book explores Abby's feeling about becoming deaf.	13+ yrs		2000
Balancing Act	Virginia M. Scott	The central character, Beth (15), became deaf and has balance difficulties after a childhood illness.		YA Family Relationships	1997
Mary Mehan Awake (Becoming Mary Mehan Book 2)	Jennifer Armstrong	The central character falls in love with Henry, left deaf by the war after exposure to loud explosions. He communicates by writing notes and she describes sounds to him.	11+ yrs	Historical fiction, set in America	1997
A Sudden Silence	Eve Bunting	The central character's brother, Bry (16), is deaf and uses lip-reading and sign language to communicate. He is killed in the presence of the main character by a hit-and-run driver. He could not hear the car coming from behind. This book has won the California Young Readers Medal for Young Adult (1992) and Oklahoma Sequoyah Award for YA (1991).	12+ yrs	Murder mystery / Alcoholism	1988 reprinted in 2007
Bird-eyes	Madelyn Arnold	One of the main characters is Anna, who is a Deaf widow admitted to a mental hospital in the 1960s for depression. She is 'not allowed' to sign by the authorities but does teach the central character to sign. This book won the Lambda Literary Award for Lesbian Debut Fiction (1988).		LGBQ / Mental Health	1988, reprinted in 2000
Belonging	Virginia M. Scott	The main character, Gustie, is 15 when she becomes deaf in her right ear after having meningitis. The book is about her adjusting to her new circumstances. Gustie uses a hearing aid and lip reading to communicate and then learns to fingerspell. She has a boyfriend and meets his brother and sister-in-law who are both Deaf. She returns to her mainstream school where her friends are unkind. She has a notetaker at School. Published by Gallaudet University Press.		YA Romance / Friendships	1986

== Books for Adults with deaf characters ==
Title	Author	Deaf Characters / Awards Won	Target Age	Gerne	Year 1st Published
Normal: A Mother and Her Beautiful Son	Magdalena Newman	This book is the autobiography of the mother of a teenage son with severe Treacher Collins syndrome, a craniofacial condition which affects his ability to breathe, hear or eat. In the book he has 67 surgeries and wears BAHA hearing aids.		Autobiography	2020
Dark Pines (Tuva Moodyson Mystery 1)	Will Dean	The central character, Tuva, became deaf after having meningitis as a child and as an adult she wears hearing aids and uses lip-reading and speech to communicate.		Crime thriller	2018
Friend (With Benefits) Zone	Laura Brown	Both the main characters, which are in a romantic relationship, are deaf.		Romance	2017
Diary of a Beautiful Disaster	Kristin Bartzokis	This book is the autobiography of a lady with Treacher Collins syndrome, a craniofacial condition which can also cause hearing loss. She wears a BAHA hearing aid and uses speech to communicate. In the book she has some awful medical experiences following surgery.		Autobiography	2017
Levi (Forbidden Desires #2)	Justine Elvira	A small character, a child, is Deaf and uses ASL to communicate.	18+ yrs	Erotic Fiction	2017
Silent Fear	Lance Morcan, James Morcan	This book is set in a fictional University for the Deaf—most of the characters are Deaf or can use BSL to communicate.		Horror	2017
And Fire Came Down (Caleb Zelic #2)	Emma Viskic	The central character, Caleb, is Profoundly Deaf since a young child and uses lip-reading and Auslan to communicate. There are other characters who use sign language.		Australian Crime / Mystery	2017
Deafness Gain	Michael Uniacke	This second book in the autobiography of Michael Uniacke tells how, as an adult, he explores his deaf identity and joins a deaf community of non-signers.		Autobiography	2016
The Silent Book: A Deaf Family and the Disappearing Australian-Irish Sign Language	Bernadette T Wallis	This book is based on the true story of a deaf family in Victoria, Australia and focuses on the Australian-Irish Sign language that was used by the Catholic Deaf Community but is no longer taught in Schools.		Australian Deaf History	2016
Signs of Attraction	Laura Brown	The main character, Carli, has hearing aids and uses speech to communicate and learns ASL. Another character Reed is also deaf. They meet while studying at university.	18-25 yrs	New Adult / Romance	2016
Rock Candy Kisses (3:AM Kisses #5)	Addison Moore	The central character, Annie (19), was born Profoundly Deaf and uses lip-reading and ASL to communicate. In the book, her mother encourages her to get a cochlear implant which she does and then rapidly develops very clear speech. Annie previously attended a school for the hearing impaired and is starting at Whitney Briggs University where she has an ASL interpreter in class.		New Adult / Erotic Romance	2015
Resurrection Bay (Caleb Zelic #1)	Emma Viskic	The central character, Caleb (in his 30s), is a deaf private detective. He became deaf aged five after having meningitis and uses lip-reading with strangers and Auslan to communicate with his deaf friends. The book describes times when he can't follow what is being said and reminds others to move to ensure their face is well lit. This book has won several awards: the 2016 Ned Kelly Award for Best First Fiction, Davitt Awards for Best Novel, Best Debut and Reader's Choice, iBooks Australia's Crime Novel of the Year and was shortlisted for the UK Gold Dagger and New Blood Awards. Nominated for Barry Award for Best paperback.		Australian Crime Thriller	2015
Graeme Clark: the man who invented the bionic ear	Mark Worthing	This book is a biography of Graeme Clark, the man who invented cochlear implants. There deaf people in the book include his father who had hearing loss.		Biography	2015
Signs	Anna Martin	The central character, Caleb (18), wears hearing aids, has social anxiety and doesn't feel part of the Deaf community. He uses a shorthand form of ASL to communicate at home with his parents. In the story, he's in a Gay relationship and the book includes explicit sex scenes. He previously went to a special school but is now in a mainstream school.	18+ yrs	New Adult, Erotic, LGBTQ Romance	2015
Not Fade Away: A Memoir of Senses Lost and Found	Rebecca A. Alexander, Sascha Alper	This autobiography is written by Rebecca Alexander. She has Usher syndrome type III which has caused her to have progressive hearing and sight loss from childhood.		Autobiography	2015
Different ways of being	Alan Balter	The book starts with Willa and Robert, a couple deaf from birth who are culturally Deaf, and have a child called Seth. Seth goes to Gallaudet University and has a Deaf boyfriend called Jacob. The Deaf characters and Seth use ASL to communicate.		Deaf culture, LGBTQ+	2015
Deafness Down	Michael Uniacke, Rachel Burt	This autobiography tells the story of Michael Uniacke's (6+) childhood, while deaf in a Catholic mainstream school. He also has three deaf siblings and one hearing sister.		Autobiography 1960s Australia	2015
Maybe Someday (Maybe #1)	Colleen Hoov	One of the main characters, Ridge (24), is Deaf and uses ASL to communicate.		New Adult Romance	2014
What Is Visible	Kimberly Elkins	This book is based on the true story of Laura Bridgman who became deaf-blind and lost her sense of smell/taste aged two after an illness (possibly scarlet fever). She could read Braille and used tactile sign language to communicate. She spent most of her school and adult life at the Perkins Institution for the Blind. She was born 50 years before Helen Keller. The book includes her periods of unhappiness, self-harm and anorexia. This book has won the David J. Langum Sr. Prize for American Historical Fiction (2014).		Historical Biography set in America 1829–1889	2014
Finding Zoe: A Deaf Woman's Journey of Love, Identity, and Adoption	Brandi Rarus, Gail Harris	This is the true story of a Deaf couple: Brandi was raised orally after becoming Deaf aged six and then later joined the Deaf community and her husband Tim was from a Deaf multigenerational family which used ASL to communicate. They had three hearing sons before they adopted Zoe, a baby with progressive hearing loss.		Deaf Culture/ Adoption / Autobiography	2014
The Art of Being Deaf: A Memoir	Donna McDonald	In this autobiography, Donna tells how she went to an oral deaf school aged five then onto mainstream schools where she used lip-reading and speech to communicate and then spent her adult life in the 'hearing world'. This book is published by the Gallaudet University Press.		Autobiography	2014
Smart, Sexy and Secretive (The Reed Brothers #2)	Tammy Falkner	One of the two main characters, Logan, became deaf after a childhood illness and uses speech to communicate.	18+	Romance	2013
Song Without Words: Discovering My Deafness Halfway through Life	Gerald Shea	This autobiography is by Gerald Shea who became deaf after an illness aged six, His hearing status was discovered when he went to a mandatory hearing test for a new job aged 34. He now wears hearing aids and uses lip-reading and speech to communicate.		Autobiography	2013
Tall, Tatted and Tempting (The Reed Brothers #1)	Tammy Falkner	One of the two main characters, Logan, became deaf after a childhood illness and initially chooses not to talk but later uses speech to communicate.	18 +	Romance	2013
What Did You Say? An Unexpected Journey Into the World of Hearing Loss	Monique E. Hammond				2012
Listening Closely: A Journey to Bilateral Hearing	Arlene Romoff	The author started to become deaf in her teenage years and much later had bilateral cochlear implant surgery.		Autobiography	2011
Kicking Up Dirt: A True Story of Determination, Deafness, and Daring	Ashley Fiolek, Caroline Ryder	This book is an autobiography of Ashley Fiolek's life and career. She was born Deaf and uses ASL to communicate.			2011
Deaf in DC: A Memoir (Gallaudet New Deaf Lives Book 9)	Madan Vasishta	This autobiography by Madan tells how he became deaf aged 11 and later went on to learn Indian Sign Language and ASL and become an associate professor at Gallaudet University.		Autobiography	2011
Flying to the Light (Flying #1)	Elyse Salpeter	One of the two main characters, Danny (six), is Deaf and uses ASL to communicate, combined with some lip-reading and speech.		Fantasy / Thriller	2011
Breaking the Sound Barriers: 9 Deaf Success Stories	Julie Postance	Nine true stories: five parents of deaf children and four children from deaf adults and the variety of paths they took in life. The stories include different communication choices including speech, Auslan and bilingual upbringings.		Biographies	2009
St. Nacho's (St. Nacho's #1)	Z. A. Maxfield	One of this book's two main characters is deaf. Shawn is part of a Deaf theatre group as is Kevin, also Deaf. Shawn is also Gay and uses lip-reading, written English and ASL to communicate. This book is very sexually explicit.	18 +	LGBTQ / Romance	2008
Echo (Sensations #2)	Clint Kelly	One of the main characters, Cody (13), is deaf, wears hearing aids and uses speech to communicate.	18 yrs		2007
Whitethorn Woods	Maeve Binchy	Melanie is the Deaf Character in the story and she appears towards the end of the book. She is Profoundly deaf, attended an all-girl deaf school as a child and communicates in sign language and speech and later enrols in a training program to teach deaf children.		Irish Family Saga / Romance	2007
Teaching from the Heart and Soul: The Robert F. Panara Story (Deaf Lives Series, Vol. 6)	Harry G. Lang	This biography is about Robert who became deaf aged 10 after having meningitis. He used ASL to communicate.		Biography	2007
Neither–Nor: A Young Australian's Experience with Deafness (The Fifth Deaf Lives Series)	Paul Jacobs	This is a biography of Jason who became deaf aged five and uses speech and lip-reading to communicate. He attends university and plays in the Deaf Australian World Cup cricket team but never learns to sign. Published by the Gallaudet University Press.		Biography, Australia	2007
Deafening	Frances Itani	The main character in this book, Grania O'Neill, becomes Deaf after having Scarlet fever aged five. She initially lives at home, then attends Ontario School for the Deaf where she learns sign language and speech. This book won the Commonwealth Writers' Prize for Best Book in Caribbean and Canada (2004). This book starts in Canada but follows characters to the United States, England, Belgium and France.		Set in WW1 (1915–19) Canada	2007
Buy a Watch, Get a Wife!	Rachel Brown	The main character, Rachel, has a master's degree in Deaf Education and is an "elementary school hearing-impaired teacher," her role includes ASL interpreting for deaf and hard of hearing students across the school. Her students and her relationship with them are included in the book.		Romance, Husband in US Army goes to Iraq	2006
Isles of view	C. F. Brunner	The book focuses on a couple's relationship dynamics, as deaf/hearing, of which the author has first-hand experience One of the two main characters is Dan who has been profoundly deaf since he was a toddler and uses speech, lip-reading and sign language to communicate.		Love story, relationship conflict	2006
Girl in the Shadow	V. C. Andrews	The central character comes to life with Echo (14), who is deaf and uses ASL to communicate, and her elderly grandmother.		Horror / Family saga	2006
Deaf in Delhi: A Memoir (Deaf Lives Series, Vol. 4)	Madan Vasishta	This autobiography tells the story of Madan's life, how he went deaf at 11 after being ill with typhoid fever and the mumps. He started life in India and at aged 20, learnt Indian Sign Language and later gained a Degree from Gallaudet college where he learnt ASL.		Autobiography	2006
Silent Ears, Silent Heart: A Deaf Man's Journey Through Two Worlds	Blair LaCrosse, Michelle LaCrosse	The main character, Christopher, was born into a hearing family and the book follows his journey navigating the Deaf and hearing worlds.		Deaf culture and identity	2003
Hear Again: Back to Life with a Cochlear Implant	Arlene Romoff	The author's experience of having a cochlear implant.		Autobiography	2002
Havana Heat: A novel	Darryl Brock	The central character in this book is Luther "Dummy" Taylor who was born deaf and used ASL to communicate. He was a successful baseball pitcher in the early 1900s. This semi-fictional account of his life includes a trip to Cuba where he meets children from the deaf School, La Escuela delOrejas, and specifically forms a friendship with another deaf character called Luis (19) who also uses ASL to communicate. The book is set in 1911 America. Later in the book he teaches and coaches at the Illinois School for the Deaf and shortly before his death is honored by Kansas School for the Deaf which he attended as a child. The book was awarded the Dave Moore Award in 2000.		Baseball Historical Fiction	2000
Talk Talk	T. C. Boyle	Dana, now in her 30s, became deaf aged four after an infection. She is now a fiercely independent strong woman who is an English teacher at a school for the deaf in San Roque. Her voice gives away that she is deaf and she also uses ASL to communicate. This book won the California Book Award for Fiction (Silver) (2006).		Suspense & Thriller / Crime	2000
A Quiet World: Living with Hearing Loss	David Myres	The author's experience of hearing loss later in life.		Biography	2000
Living Legends Stories about Successful Deaf People, Book 2	Darlene Toole	Biographies of Danny Delcambre, Kathy Buckley, Ken Glickman, Bethany "Buffy" Hummel, Dr.Robert Davila and Laurene Gallimore.		Biography	1998
Discoveries Significant Contributions of Deaf Women and Men	Anita Davis, Katharine Preston	Twenty Deaf people who have made significant contributions to their field of specialism.			1998
Melody	V. C. Andrews	The main character moves in with May (10) who is deaf and uses ASL to communicate with her family.		Family saga / Horror	1996
Living Legends Stories about Successful Deaf People, Book 1	Darlene Toole	Biographies of six Deaf people, Evelyn Glennie, Howie Seago, Dr. Shirley Allen, John Woo, Karen Meyer and Paul Ogden.		Biographies	1996
A Maiden's Grave	Jeffery Deaver	The main event in this book is that a bus of eight deaf students (aged 8–17 years) are taken hostage with their teachers. The children from the School for the Deaf all use ASL to communicate. This book was made into a film called Dead Silence in 1997.	18+ yrs	Suspense & Thriller	1995, republished in 2001.
Silent Songs (StarBridge #5)	A. C. Crispin, Kathleen O'Malley	One of the main characters, Tesa, is a Native American woman who was born Deaf, uses sign language and sometimes communicates through a telepath. There is another deaf character with an alternative attitude to her deafness.		Science Fiction	1994
Silent Dances (StarBridge #2)	A. C. Crispin, Kathleen O'Malley	One of the main characters, Tesa, is a Native American woman who was born Deaf and uses sign language to communicate.		Science Fiction	1994
My island: The True Story of a Silent Challenge	Maggie Gordon, Hamish Rosie	Autobiography of Hamish Rosie, landscape artist and graphic designer, who was profoundly Deaf and lived on the island of Orkney in Scotland. His illustrations are used in the book.		Autobiography	1991
What's That Pig Outdoors?: A Memoir of Deafness	Henry Kisor	This book is an autobiography by Henry Kisor. He became deaf aged three after having meningitis and communicates by using lip-reading, written and spoken English.		Autobiography	1990
Deaf Heritage - a Narrative History of Deaf America (Gallaudet Classics in Deaf Studies)	Jack Gannon	Detailed American Deaf History			1981 republished in 2012
The Stand	Stephen King	One of the main characters, Nick, was born profoundly deaf and aged nine he was taught to lip-read, read and write by another "deaf-mute" called Rudy. Neither child uses sign language to communicate. The original 1978 book won several awards Locus Award Nominee for Best SF Novel (1979), World Fantasy Award Nominee for Best Novel (1979), Gandalf Award Nominee (1979), Balrog Award Nominee for Best Novel (1979) (1980).	18+ yrs	Postapocalyptic Horror/Fantasy	1978 uncut version published in 1991
In This Sign	Joanne Greenberg	The central characters, Abel and Janice, are both Deaf and use ASL to communicate. They are both members of the Deaf community and met at a school for the Deaf and Blind. They have a daughter called Margret who is hearing. As a CODA she often interprets for them at the bank etc and she feels the weight of this responsibility. The book was made into a 1985 film called Love Is Never Silent.		Set in the 1920s till the 1960s, Deaf Culture, Something of a CODA child's perspective	1970 republished in 1984

== See also ==
- British Sign Language
- American Sign Language Literature
- Disability in children's literature
- Disability in the arts
