= Disability in children's literature =

The representation of disability in children's literature is a matter of scholarly research, and has been a relevant subject particularly since the 1970s. However, disability representation is still a modern issue. A 2011 World Report on Disability conducted by the World Health Organization found that around 15% of the global population, 1 billion people, have a disability, yet in 2019 only 3.4% of children's books had disabled main characters. The quality of disability representation can vary depending on the specific disability portrayed. Even though society has included more diverse characters with disabilities, this representation must be handled with care to avoid promoting existing negative stereotypes.

== History of disability representation ==
=== 19th century ===
Professor Ian Davidson and colleagues analyzed the depiction of disabled characters in a collection of 19th children's literature from the Toronto Public Library. The researchers found certain common characteristics of disability representation in 19th-century children's literature: disabled characters rarely appeared as individuals, but are usually depicted as impersonal groups and reduced to five oversimplified categories: the diseased or extremely sick, the "crippled" and "deformed", the blind, the "deaf" or "mute", and the broad category of the "insane" or 'mad". The language used to describe disabled characters was often patronizing or offensive, and disabled characters were often made to suffer and were poorly treated by other characters.

Oxford Professor Ann Dowker describes how in many 19th-century books, disability representation was often vague and unclear. This lack of description results in a highly inaccurate depiction of disability that was based heavily on stereotypes. Disability representation was also often tied to moral character. For example, in What Katy Did (1872), the main character Katy's disability is depicted as an opportunity presented by God to experience the "School of Pain" through which she will learn important moral lessons. Other disabled characters, such as Tiny Tim in A Christmas Carol (1843), were depicted as saintly and pure.

Hans Christian Andersen's work present the opportunity to explore disability representation in 19th-century fairy tales. Dr. Vivian Yenika-Agbaw found that in these fairy tales, the relationship between disabled and non-disabled characters was defined by power imbalances. She argues that these relationships reinforced existing societal hierarchies. In four of Andersen's fairy tales—The Little Mermaid (1837), The Brave Tin Soldier, also known as The Steadfast Tin Soldier (1838), Little Tiny or Thumbelina (1835), and The Ugly Duckling (1843)—the character's place in the social hierarchy was determined by their disability. In all of these examples the disabled character was portrayed as "other" and at the bottom of the social hierarchy.

Though these problematic themes were common, not all disability representation in 19th-century children's literature was harmful. Dowker identifies a few examples in 19th-century literature in which the disabled characters were not helpless or saintly. The Pillars of the House (1873), The Clever Woman of the Family (1865), and The Fifth Form at St. Dominic's (1887) contain multidimensional disabled characters.

The majority of 19th century disability representation reduced disabled characters to the "other" while preaching messages of obedience to God's will and moral lessons taught through suffering.

=== 20th and 21st centuries ===
==== United States ====
In the United States, about 26% of the population has a disability, slightly higher than the 17% worldwide figure. In 2019 only 3.4% of children's books published in the US had disabled main characters, Having children read about characters with disabilities, scholars suggest, helps promote acceptance and empathy. The approach of children and youth literature (collectively called "juvenile literature") can have a significant impact on the children reading it, whether they personally have experienced disability or not; literature "has proven to be an agent capable of influencing attitudes and acceptance of impairments". Stereotypes of disabilities could also have an impact on children, this may cause children to misunderstand and view disabilities in a negative way. In "The Ethical Responsibility of Representing Disability in Children's Literature," Anna Purkiss describes how "the way disability is represented in children's literature has the potential to affect non-disabled young readers' views of disabled people in real life and also to reflect disabled readers' lived experiences back to them from the page."

Perhaps no group has been as overlooked and inaccurately represented in children's books as individuals with disabilities. Most often they were not included in stories and when they were, many negative stereotypes prevailed, such as characters who were pitiful or pathetic, evil or superheroes, or a burden and incapable of fully participating in the events of everyday life. Often the difference or disability was the main personality trait emphasized to the reader, not a balance of strengths and weaknesses. Blaska, 1996.

From 1940 to 1970, around 311 books for children were published in the United States that included characters with disabilities as main characters. Some of these books romanticized the disability, some were infantilized, while others portrayed the disabled characters as avoiding the world. Such portrayals did not reflect lived reality; an oddity is that the portrayal of blind individuals exceeded their actual numbers in the real population. Blindness was noted as being the most common disability among African-American characters in children's fiction, used as a plot device to represent the ability to see beyond racial prejudices, making the disability secondary to its significance as a plot device.

In 1986, the Individuals with Disabilities in Education Act (IDEA) was put into force in the United States, which ended the exclusion of children with disabilities from publicly funded school systems. With the integration of children with disabilities into public schools, a new interest arose in representing disabled people in children's books. Barbara Holland Baskin and Karen H. Harris conducted influential research into the portrayal of disability in children and youth literature in the late 1970s. They published the seminal study Notes from a Different Drummer (1977), followed by More Notes from a Different Drummer (1984). Today, disability in juvenile literature is a standard topic included in bibliographies, research, criticism, and review sources. Several bibliographies and studies reviewing fiction and non-fiction have been produced in the years since.

The evolution of the portrayal of disability can be seen in the books written since the 1970s. Judy Blume shows the experience of a teenage girl diagnosed with idiopathic scoliosis in Deenie (1973). The protagonist, Deenie, faces the challenges brought by having to wear a body brace during her treatment, which impacts her perceptions of herself and those of her family and fellow students. Deenie does not overcome the disability by the end of the story, nor is she defeated by it; the conclusion more realistically shows her continuing to face challenges and learning to adjust to them.

A trend in current juvenile fiction is the portrayal of characters with "hidden disabilities" that have become more common diagnoses in recent decades. Examples include Petra Mathers' Sophie and Lou (1991), about extreme shyness that is an emotional and social disability, and Caroline Janover's The Worst Speller in Jr. High (1995) about a boy with dyslexia. In fiction for older youth, disability has recently been dealt with in complex situations with nuanced techniques such as multiple-perspective narrative; an example is Erika Tamar's Fair Game (1993), about a group of male students who repeatedly sexually assault an intellectually disabled girl at their school.

Bibliographer Debra Robertson, who wrote Portraying Persons with Disabilities: An Annotated Bibliography of Fiction for Children and Teenagers (1992), pointed out in the early 1990s that not every disability has to be a "metaphor for a protagonist's development", and the tendency of writers to romanticize or stigmatize medical conditions in this way is a persistent problem in juvenile literature.

More recent studies have indicated that educators may improve student understanding of disability with "follow-up discussion or activities and stories that portray characters with disabilities accurately, realistically, and positively".

Researchers from the University of Prešov completed a research project focused on human disadvantage in book production for children and young people (original and translated literature from the mid-19th century to 2020). The results showed the historical variability of literary and artistic creative approaches to depicting the topic.

Every two years, the International Board on Books for Young People (IBBY) published a list of books for and about young people with disabilities.

== Features of harmful disability representation ==
Representation of disabled characters in literature has come a long way over the years but continued uses of stereotypes and misleading representations have a harmful effect on readers. When done correctly disabled characters can be used to aid in conversations about the disabled and what they experience in everyday life.

== Features of positive disability representation ==
Professors Alicia Rieger and Ewa McGrail discuss how authentic disability representation portrays disability as a part of the character, rather than making it their entire identity. Monica Kleekamp and Angie Zapata, in a 2019 article in The Reading Teacher, introduce four features of positive representation in children's literature, which include presenting characters with a disability as multidimensional, having their voices tell the story, position readers to not take disabled characters for granted, and have such characters have authentic relationships.

When authors write books with characters who have disabilities as the main characters, they have a responsibility to write books that are "accurate and authentic" to the experiences of disabled people.

== See also ==
- Ableism
- Children's literature
- Disability in the arts
- Inclusion (disability rights)
- List of children's books featuring deaf characters
- List of children's books featuring characters with limb differences
