= List of children's books featuring characters with limb differences =

In the United States each year, roughly 1 in 1,900 people are born with a limb difference, and an additional 185,000 individuals experience a limb amputation. Children's literature with representation of characters with upper limb differences help empower children to accept their own, as well as others', differences.

== Series of books for children featuring characters with limb differences ==
Includes series of three or more books (two book series and standalone series are included on the next list). Series are listed by publication date. Bold text indicates author or illustrator with a limb difference.

Title (Series)	Author/Illustrator	Character(s) with limb difference(s)	Year 1st Published	Book type
Aven Green	Dusti Bowling/Gina Perry	Protagonist is a girl with no arms.	2021-Present	Chapter book
What Happened to You?	**James Catchpole** & Lucy Catchpole/Karen George	Protagonist is a boy missing his right leg.	2021-2024	Picture book
The Wolf in Underpants	Wilfrid Lupano/Mayana Itoïz	Protagonist has a friend that is a bird with one small wing. Featured prominently in the second ("The Wolf in Underpants: At Full Speed") and third ("The Wolf in Underpants Breaks Free") books in the series.	2019-Present	Graphic novel
Mia Mayhem	Kara West/Leeza Hernandez	Protagonist's friend has prosthetic legs. This friend is in some books of this series.	2018-Present	Chapter book
5 Worlds	Mark Siegel, Alexis Siegel /Xanthe Bouma, Matt Rockefeller, Boya Sun	One protagonist is a robot who loses his right arm in an accident and then receives a new mechanical arm. Another protagonist begins losing his right hand due to a mysterious illness.	2017-2022	Picture book
Just Jessica	**Jessica Smith**/Hasīna Shafad	Protagonist is a girl without a right hand.	2022	Picture book
Dinosaur Farm: A story about a kid with a limb difference that is NOT about the limb difference	Kristen Silva	The author has written versions of this story with various protagonists, including: a boy missing fingers on his left hand, a girl with a prosthetic left leg, and a boy with a prosthetic right leg.	2019	Picture book
Avery Takes the Stage	Kristen Silva	Various versions of this book. Sophia: prosthetic left leg. Ava: congenital left-hand limb difference. Clara: missing part of her right arm (congenital amputee). Kyra: missing part of her right arm (congenital amputee).	2018-2019	Picture book
The Chronicles of Claudette	Kara West/Leeza Hernandez	Protagonist's father has above knee and left arm amputations from fight with dragon.	2012-2018	Chapter book

== Other books for children featuring characters with limb differences ==
Books are listed by publication date. Bold text indicates author or illustrator with a limb difference.

Title (Series)	Author/Illustrator	Character(s) with limb difference(s)	Year 1st Published	Book type
I am the Cage	**Allison Sweet Grant**	Protagonist is a girl with a congenital short femur.	2025	Chapter book
Lucy's Fancy Leg	**Lisa DeJong**	Protagonist is a girl with a below-the-knee amputation on her left leg.	2024	Picture book
The abilities in me: Limb Difference	Gemma Keir/Yevheniia Lisovaya	Protagonist is a girl missing fingers on her right hand as well as her right leg below her knee.	2022	Picture book
Baking Up a Storm	Jessica Parham/Srimalie Bassani	Protagonist is a boy without a left hand.	2022	Picture book
Come Over to My House	Eliza Hull, Sally Rippin/Daniel Gray-Barnett	Examples of lots of different disabilities and how people live by showing kids playing at each other's houses. One family includes a dad with a missing forearm and his various prosthetics. There is also a parent with dwarfism who uses a reaching claw to assist.	2022	Picture book
Goldie's Tasty Tacos	Nicole Julia/Jeff Crowther	Protagonist is a girl goat who does not have a left hand.	2022	Chapter book
I am Sheriauna: We are Able	Sherylee Honeyghan/Ana Patankar	Protagonist is Sheriauna Haase, a girl with a congenital upper limb difference on his left side.	2022	Picture book
My Friend Jackson	Sharon Wasson	Protagonist is a boy with congenital limb differences.	2022	Picture book
Perfectly Precious Peggy: A True Story about Challenges, Acceptance, and Friendship	Dale Lee Loomis/Maria Mughal	Protagonist is a female goat missing her front right leg.	2022	Picture book
Why Me, Mama?	Katherine Lockwood/Evgeniya Erokhina	Two of the characters have a limb difference. Every character in the story represents a different disability.	2022	Picture book
ABC Let's Celebrate You and Me	Sugar Snap Studio	Features several characters with limb differences, including a boy with a prosthetic right leg, a boy with a prosthetic left leg, a boy with two short fingers on his left hand, and a girl without a left hand.	2021	Picture book
The Bare Naked Book	Kathy Stinson/Meilssa Cho	Depiction of many people, including some with limb differences.	2021	Picture book
What makes you Super?: Let's talk about Amniotic Band Syndrome	Fernanda Neves/Leonardo Zampronio	Protagonist is a girl missing her index and middle fingers on her right hand, from Amniotic Band Syndrome.	2021	Picture book
When You See a Child Who's Different	Abbey Luckett Benjamin/Michael Garriga	Depiction of children with various limb differences.	2021	Picture book
Bodies are Cool	Tyler Feder	Book shows a variety of different bodies (including ones with varied limb differences).	2021	Picture book
Good to Be Me	Jessica Parham/Srimalie Bassani	Depiction of many kids, including some with limb differences.	2021	Picture book
Kodi	Jared Cullum	One of the main characters is an amputee from a fishing accident.	2021	Graphic novel
Roxy and Maliboo: It's Okay to Be Different	Hillary Sussman/Blake Marsee	Protagonist is a dog missing her right back leg because she was ill.	2021	Picture book
Roxy and Tully: Words Matter	Hillary Sussman/Blake Marsee	Protagonist is a dog missing her right back leg because she was ill.	2021	Picture book
Splash	**Claire Cashmore**/Sharon Davey	Protagonist is Claire Cashmore (Paralympian) as a child. She does not have a left hand.	2021	Picture book (based on true story)
Timo the Adventurer	Jonathan Garnier/Yohan Sacré	Protagonist loses his arm (due to magic) near the end of the book.	2021	Graphic novel
The Wonky Donkey	Craig Smith	Protagonist is a donkey missing front left leg; wears a prosthetic.	2021	Picture book
Alf's Power	Mina Minozzi/Miruna Prunache	Protagonist is a boy without his lower left arm.	2020	Picture book
Brooklyn's Lucky Fin	Jenna Regan	Protagonist is a girl with what she calls a "lucky fin," referring to her right hand specifically.	2020	Picture book
Evie's Missing Something	Khadija Johnson	Protagonist is a girl missing the lower part of her left arm.	2020	Picture book
We Are Little Feminists On-the-Go	Brook Sitgraves Turner/Archaa Shrivastav	Depicts many children, including some with various limb differences.	2020	Board book
5 Fingers and 10 Toes: Jo-Jo Goes to School	Dawn Civitello/Francisco Villa	Protagonist is a boy with a congenital upper limb difference on his left side.	2019	Picture book
Awesomely Emma: A Charley and Emma Story	Amy Webb/Merrilee Liddiard	One of the two protagonists is a girl with a congenital upper and lower limb differences.	2019	Picture book
The Bionic Kid: Bionic Beginnings	Zachary Pamboukas, Christo Pamboukas, Niko Pamboukas	Protagonist is a boy with a congenital upper limb difference on his right side.	2019	Comic
The Bionic Kid, Issue 2	Zachary Pamboukas, Christo Pamboukas, Niko Pamboukas	Protagonist is a boy with a congenital upper limb difference on his right side.	2019	Comic
Hands (My Body, Your Body)	John Wood	Book displays a variety of hands, some displaying hands with varied lengths of fingers or number of fingers.	2019	Picture book
Rae's First Day: The First Story in the Capable Series	Danny Jordan/Agustina Perciante	Protagonist is a girl with radial dysplasia (on her right side).	2019	Comic
Sophia Takes the Stage	Kristen Silva	Protagonist is a girl with a prosthetic left leg.	2019	Picture book
When Charley Met Emma	Amy Webb/Merrilee Liddiard	One of the two protagonists is a girl with a congenital upper and lower limb differences.	2019	Picture book
5 Fingers and 10 Toes	Dawn Civitello/Francisco Villa	Protagonist is a boy with a congenital upper limb difference on his left side.	2019	Picture book
Momentous Events in the Life of a Cactus	Dusti Bowling	Protagonist is a girl who is a congenital double-arm amputee.	2019	Chapter book
Ava Takes the Stage	Kristen Silva	Protagonist is a girl with a congenital left-hand limb difference.	2018	Picture book
Barefoot Books: Children of the World	Tessa Strickland, Kate DePalma/David Dean	Depiction of many children, including those with limb differences.	2018	Picture book
Clara Takes the Stage	Kristen Silva	Protagonist is a girl missing part of her right arm (congenital amputee).	2018	Picture book
Kyra Takes the Stage	Kristen Silva	Protagonist is a girl missing part of her right arm (congenital amputee).	2018	Picture book
Look What Kate Can Do: One Hand Works as Well as Two	Katie Leatherwood, Paul Leatherwood	Protagonist is a girl with symbrachydactyly on her left hand.	2018	Picture book
Reindeer in Here	Adam Reed/Xindi Yan	Protagonist is a reindeer with shortened left antler.	2018	Picture book
Rescue and Jessica: A Life-Changing Friendship	**Jessica Kensky**/**Patrick Downes**	Protagonist is a girl who is a double-leg below-knee (acquired) amputee. Her left leg is amputated at start of the book, and her right is amputated during the book. An author's note explains how the real Jessica and Patrick became amputees following the Boston Marathon bombing in 2013.	2018	Picture book (based on true story)
I am Sheriauna	Sherylee Honeyghan/Ana Patankar	Protagonist is Sheriauna Haase, a girl with a congenital upper limb difference on her left side.	2017	Picture book
I Have a Doll Just Like You!	Julie Ann Zitterkopf Larson/Jacqueline Kerr	One of the protagonists is a boy with a congenital amputation of his left arm.	2017	Picture book
Insignificant Events in the Life of a Cactus	Dusti Bowling	Protagonist is a girl who is a congenital double-arm amputee.	2017	Chapter book
Rising Above: How 11 Athletes Overcame Challenges in Their Youths to Become Stars	Gregory Zuckerman, Elijah Zuckerman, Gabriel Zuckerman	Includes the story of a professional baseball pitcher Jim Abbott, who was born without a right hand.	2017	Non-fiction
Uniquely Brave	Trace Wilson/Ana Sebastian	Protagonist is a boy with a congenital upper limb difference on his left side.	2017	Picture book
Different is Awesome	**Ryan Haack**/Wes Molebash	Protagonist is a boy with a congenital upper limb difference on his left side.	2015	Picture book
Emmanuel's Dream: The True Story of Emmanuel Ofosu Yeboah	Laurie Ann Thompson, Sean Qualls	Protagonist is a boy with a congenital lower limb different on right-hand side.	2015	Picture book (non-fiction)
My Little Leg	Robyn Lambert	Protagonist is a girl with a prosthetic leg.	2015	Picture book
My Little Leg Grows Bigger	Robyn Lambert	Protagonist is a girl with a prosthetic leg.	2015	Picture book
Nimona	ND Stevenson	One protagonist is a man with an amputated right arm.	2015	Graphic novel
Uniquely Me	Trace Wilson/Ana Sebastian	Protagonist is a boy with a congenital upper limb difference on his left side.	2015	Picture book
Just Like Us: A Coloring Book Celebrating Children with Limb Differences	Jennifer Latham Robinson	Depiction of many kids with varying limb differences.	2014	Coloring book
Harry and Willy and Carrothead	Judith Caseley	One of the protagonists (Harry) is a congenital left hand amputee.	1991	Picture book

== See also ==
- Congenital limb deformities
- Amputation
- List of children's books featuring deaf characters
- List of amputees in film
- Category:Amputees
- Category:Fiction about amputees
