= ToyLikeMe =

UK-based arts and play organisation

ToyLikeMe is a UK-based arts and play not-for-profit organisation which campaigns for better disability representation in the toy industry.

== History ==
ToyLikeMe was established in April 2015 by Rebecca Atkinson. Atkinson and cofounder Karen Newell began making over toys to represent disability in a positive way. The company offers various toys representing alopecia, vision impairment, hearing aids and cochlear implants, limb difference, mobility difference and more. Other toys available include puzzles and LEGO.

== Significance ==
ToyLikeMe began with Atkinson creating toys representing disability in a positive way. ToyLikeMe hopes offering toys with disabilities will help improve self-esteem for children with disabilities and start conversations about disability. Atkinson states producing toys with disabilities reflects the message of all bodies being included and celebrated. Similarly, working towards the social model of disability rather than the medical model of disability. Providing toys with disabilities works to separate disability from negative stereotypes and villainous characters portraying disability.

== Influence Within the Global Toy Industry ==
Historically, toys representing a disability were geared specifically towards kids with disabilities. Since the #ToyLikeMe campaign of 2015 many toy brands have produced toys which represent disability. Lottie dolls have issued dolls with cochlear implants, autism and achondroplasia, whilst Barbie have extended their line to include wheelchairs, prosthetic limps, vitiligo and albinism.

== Disability Education ==
=== Teaching Resources ===
ToyLikeMe has developed three downloadable resources on TES.com for teachers of KS1 and KS2 about disability, identity, play and representation. The company has expanded by offering coloring sheets.

=== Events ===
One form of event for disability education that ToyLikeMe offers are workshops. Other ways the company engages with the community is through events such as art exhibitions.

== Pre-school animation series ==
In May 2019 ToyLikeMe co-founder Rebecca Atkinson announced that she's creating a pre-school animation series called Mixmups along with Mackinnon & Saunders and Raydar Media.

The Mixmups show centres around three little friends with a light-up wooden spoon and a magical mixing box combining play and imagination to mix up adventures. The show features lead characters with a wheelchair and another with a guide dog.
