= The Most Awesome Character in the World =

2020 children's book by Adam Pottle

- Author: Adam Pottle
- Illustrator: Ana Sanfelippo
- Language: English
- Genre: Adventure; Children's
- Publisher: Reycraft Books
- Publication date: 2020
- Publication place: United States
- Pages: 32
- ISBN: 978-1-4788-6812-5

The Most Awesome Character in the World is a 2020 children's adventure book by author Adam Pottle and illustrator Ana Sanfelippo. The book depicts a deaf girl named Philomena who uses her imagination and drawing skills to create her own superhero (the titular "Most Awesome Character").

Shortly after the book's publication in September 2020, Pottle asked readers not to buy it due to an illustration that he viewed as racially insensitive. The publisher Reycraft Books later withdrew it from sale.

== Plot ==
Philomena, a young deaf girl, suffers from excessive feedback in her hearing aids. She cannot use her imagination when wearing them and prefers to communicate with sign language.

While Philomena is exploring an imaginary jungle, her father interrupts her to give her a book about a deaf woman. However, she thinks the woman on the cover looks "sad" and is not interested in reading it.

Believing she can tell a better story than the book, Philomena starts to draw. She envisions a colorful set of characters in her bedroom around her, including monsters, robots, and people in wheelchairs. Finally, a giant three-eyed green woman in a superhero costume, whom Philomena calls "THE MOST AWESOME CHARACTER", emerges from the page.

THE MOST AWESOME CHARACTER demands that the other characters hold a talent show. The monsters release a symphony of burps, while the people in wheelchairs perform aerial stunts. THE MOST AWESOME CHARACTER defeats one monster by breathing lightning and beats two others in a wrestling ring. Philomena shows off her own talent by growing fifty feet tall and creating a new star, which she throws into the sky.

After she finishes imagining, Philomena takes a rest and collects her drawings into a book, which she tells her father was written by "the most awesome writer in the world—me".

== Background ==
Pottle, a Canadian author, was born in Kamloops and as of 2020 lived in Saskatoon. He was born deaf and wrote The Most Awesome Character in the World due to feeling that children's literature lacked relatable deaf characters.

The Most Awesome Character in the World was written in 2017 after an editor at Reycraft Books, a publisher based in New York, saw Pottle's posts on Twitter about deaf literature. The book was commissioned under Reycraft's "Own Voices" imprint, which focused on books with characters of diverse identities written by authors who share those identities.

Pottle signed a work for hire contract with Reycraft, receiving a flat payment while giving the publisher ownership of the story. Pottle said that he requested a deaf illustrator for the book; Reycraft selected Sanfelippo, a non-deaf children's book illustrator born in Argentina and based in Madrid.

== Publication history ==
The Most Awesome Character in the World was published in September 2020. Within weeks, its publisher Reycraft Books agreed to pause sales of the book after Pottle expressed concerns that the book's illustrations contained racial stereotypes. In November, the publisher decided to withdraw the book from sale permanently.

== Reception ==
The illustration criticized by Pottle

=== Initial reception ===
Reviews for The Most Awesome Character in the World began to appear in July 2020, ahead of the book's September publication date. Kirkus Reviews called the book a "colorful celebration of creativity and Deafness", although it said the plot was "thin" and one character "unfortunately plays into Asian stereotypes". School Library Journal said that the book's "well-intentioned and truly empowering message" was "obscured by a confusing narrative and problematic illustrations".

=== Reaction from Pottle ===
After reading the advance reviews of his book, Pottle grew concerned that both reviews mentioned a character that "plays into Asian stereotypes". The character in question is depicted as an Asian girl in a wheelchair wearing a kimono, with her hair styled in two buns.

Pottle said that he had not seen the book's illustrations until after it had been sent out for reviews. He requested an advance copy of The Most Awesome Character in the World three weeks before its publication date, and said he felt "nauseated" upon viewing the illustrations.

Pottle consulted with an Asian-Canadian sensitivity reader, who agreed with him that the portrayal was racially stereotypical. The character was shown practicing martial arts and laughing with her hand in front of her mouth, which the sensitivity reader said was an Asian stereotype. The character's clothing also contrasted with other characters wearing "contemporary American clothes", which the sensitivity reader said was Orientalist.

Two days before the book's publication, Pottle asked Reycraft Books to delay its release date in order to change the artwork. Reycraft declined, saying that the book had already been printed. Pottle then told Reycraft that he would not promote or support the book.

Pottle spoke out against The Most Awesome Character in the World in a social media campaign, asking readers, booksellers, and libraries not to purchase it. In interviews with media outlets, he said he felt "robbed of my own story", adding: "I don’t like readers to feel alienated, and I don’t want to spread the message that we can celebrate one culture at the expense of another." Pottle said he wanted Reycraft to republish his book using a deaf illustrator and issue an apology to Asian readers.

=== Publisher response ===
Sera Reycraft, publisher at Reycraft Books, disagreed with Pottle's view of the illustration. Reycraft, an Asian woman born in South Korea who immigrated to the United States, said that the book's artwork was "thoughtfully crafted by a very talented illustrator with careful oversight by our Asian-American editor." The character's appearance was reportedly based on a combination of Princess Leia and WWE performers.

Reycraft called the artwork "a fun celebratory depiction of a Japanese girl in a festive yukata" that represented Philomena's love for Japanese culture, also demonstrated by the maneki-neko on her desk and the robot characters in her drawings. She argued that by "affirming children’s place as global citizens when we include characters in our books that appreciate other cultures", the illustrations could better reflect the diverse realities of the book's audience.

In a statement, Reycraft Books also disputed Pottle's version of events. The publisher said that Pottle had been shown a final version of The Most Awesome Character in the World, contradicting his statement that he had not seen the illustrations beforehand. Furthermore, the publisher said Pottle had initially called the book "fantastic", only criticizing the artwork after reading the advance reviews.

Responding to Pottle's campaign, Reycraft Books said in October that it would "reassess" the book and pause sales to "think about how we might address concerns", such as by adding a note explaining the Japanese cultural references in the artwork. In November, the publisher informed Pottle's agent that the book had been permanently removed from distribution.

=== Reactions from third parties ===
Another Story Bookshop in Toronto wrote an open letter to Reycraft Books asking them to honor Pottle's request to withdraw the book. Other bookstores and libraries across Canada and the U.S., including McNally Robinson and Powell's Books, declined to sell or lend the book as well. It was also removed from the U.S. website of Barnes & Noble.

Jonathan Kay, columnist for the National Post, said that The Most Awesome Character in the World represented a "particularly absurd" controversy "over a drawing of an Asian kid dressed like a space princess." He called Pottle "the world's first cancel-culture soloist" for criticizing his own book "so he can protect readers from a fictional thoughtcrime."

Sanfelippo reportedly received hate mail and threats due to the controversy, and requested that her name be removed from the book.
