= 1967 IAAF World Race Walking Cup =

- Organisers: IAAF
- Edition: 4th
- Date: October 15
- Host city: Bad Saarow, Bezirk Frankfurt (Oder), German Democratic Republic (East Germany)
- Events: 2
- Participation: 48 athletes from 8 nations

The 1967 IAAF World Race Walking Cup was held in Bad Saarow, German Democratic Republic, on October 15, 1967. The event was also known as Lugano Trophy.

Complete results were published.

== Medallists ==
Event	Gold		Silver		Bronze	
Men
20 km walk	Nikolay Smaga (URS)	1:28:39	Vladimir Golubnichiy (URS)	1:28:58	Ron Laird (USA)	1:29:13
50 km walk	Christoph Höhne (GDR)	4:09:09	Peter Selzer (GDR)	4:11:40	Aleksandr Shcherbina (URS)	4:13:07
Men (Team)
Team	East Germany	128 pts	Soviet Union	107 pts	United Kingdom	104 pts

== Results ==
=== Men's 20 km ===
Place	Athlete	Nation	Time
1st place, gold medalist(s)	Nikolay Smaga	Soviet Union (URS)	1:28:39
2nd place, silver medalist(s)	Vladimir Golubnichiy	Soviet Union (URS)	1:28:58
3rd place, bronze medalist(s)	Ron Laird	United States (USA)	1:29:13
4	Gerhard Sperling	East Germany (GDR)	1:30:15
5	Peter Frenkel	East Germany (GDR)	1:30:30
6	Peter Fullager	Great Britain (GBR)	1:31:34
7	Hans-Joachim Pathus	East Germany (GDR)	1:33:07
8	John Webb	Great Britain (GBR)	1:33:56
9	Ron Wallwork	Great Britain (GBR)	1:34:54
10	Julius Müller	West Germany (FRG)	1:35:00
11	Bernhard Nermerich	West Germany (FRG)	1:35:37
12	Åke Söderlund	Sweden (SWE)	1:36:02
13	Karl-Heinz Pape	West Germany (FRG)	1:36:06
14	István Göri	Hungary (HUN)	1:36:09
15	Pasquale Busca	Italy (ITA)	1:36:22
16	Tom Dooley	United States (USA)	1:37:21
17	János Dalmati	Hungary (HUN)	1:37:53
18	Andor Antal	Hungary (HUN)	1:38:03
19	Örjan Andersson	Sweden (SWE)	1:38:15
20	Gabriele Nigro	Italy (ITA)	1:40:48
21	Ingvar Pettersson	Sweden (SWE)	1:41:39
22	Jack Mortland	United States (USA)	1:42:14
23	Gennadiy Solodov	Soviet Union (URS)	1:48:24
—	Nicola De Vito	Italy (ITA)	DNF

=== Men's 50 km ===
Place	Athlete	Nation	Time
1st place, gold medalist(s)	Christoph Höhne	East Germany (GDR)	4:09:09
2nd place, silver medalist(s)	Peter Selzer	East Germany (GDR)	4:11:40
3rd place, bronze medalist(s)	Aleksandr Shcherbina	Soviet Union (URS)	4:13:07
4	Kurt Sakowski	East Germany (GDR)	4:13:52
5	Sergey Bondarenko	Soviet Union (URS)	4:21:52
6	Don Thompson	Great Britain (GBR)	4:25:21
7	Stig Lindberg	Sweden (SWE)	4:28:53
8	Ray Middleton	Great Britain (GBR)	4:29:23
9	Shaun Lightman	Great Britain (GBR)	4:31:24
10	Igor Della-Rossa	Soviet Union (URS)	4:31:28
11	István Havasi	Hungary (HUN)	4:33:01
12	Gerhard Weidner	West Germany (FRG)	4:35:25
13	Horst-Rüdiger Magnor	West Germany (FRG)	4:36:53
14	Max Sjöholm	Sweden (SWE)	4:40:21
15	Sante Mancini	Italy (ITA)	4:41:26
16	Antonio De Gaetano	Italy (ITA)	4:41:49
17	Goetz Klopfer	United States (USA)	4:46:42
18	Werner Hupfeld	West Germany (FRG)	4:50:46
19	Luigi De Rosso	Italy (ITA)	4:51:50
20	James Clifton	United States (USA)	4:57:07
21	János Szabó	Hungary (HUN)	5:02:53
22	Larry Young	United States (USA)	5:06:08
23	Tibor Balajcza	Hungary (HUN)	5:18:05
—	Stefan Ingvarsson	Sweden (SWE)	DNF

=== Team ===
The team rankings, named Lugano Trophy, combined the 20km and 50km events team results.

Place	Country	Points
1st place, gold medalist(s)	East Germany	128 pts
2nd place, silver medalist(s)	Soviet Union	107 pts
3rd place, bronze medalist(s)	United Kingdom	104 pts
4	West Germany	73 pts
5	Sweden	52 pts
6	United States	50 pts
7	Hungary	46 pts
8	Italy	40 pts
9	South Africa	DNS

== Participation ==
The participation of 48 athletes from 8 countries is reported.

- East Germany (6)
- Hungary (6)
- Italy (6)
- Soviet Union (6)
- Sweden (6)
- United Kingdom (6)
- United States (6)
- West Germany (6)

== Qualifying rounds ==
From 1961 to 1985 there were qualifying rounds with the first two winners proceeding to the final. This year, the German Democratic Republic, the United Kingdom, Hungary, the United States, and the Republic of South Africa proceeded directly to the final.

Countries qualifying for the final are highlighted in green

=== Zone 1 ===
Dole, France, August 26/27

Rank	Nation	Points
1	Italy	75 pts
2	West Germany	65 pts
3	France	41 pts
4	Switzerland	37 pts
5	Belgium	22 pts

=== Zone 2 ===
København, Denmark, September 9/10

Rank	Nation	Points
1	Soviet Union	86 pts
2	Sweden	60 pts
3	Czechoslovakia	37 pts
4	Bulgaria	34 pts
5	Denmark	23 pts
