= 1963 IAAF World Race Walking Cup =

- Organisers: IAAF
- Edition: 2nd
- Date: October 12–13
- Host city: Varese, Lombardy, Italy
- Events: 2
- Participation: 36 athletes from 12 nations

The 1963 IAAF World Race Walking Cup was held in Varese, Italy, on October 12–13, 1963. The event was also known as Lugano Trophy.

Complete results were published.

== Medallists ==
Event	Gold		Silver		Bronze	
Men
20 km walk	Ken Matthews (GBR)	1:30:10	Paul Nihill (GBR)	1:33:18	Antal Kiss (HUN)	1:33:38
50 km walk	István Havasi (HUN)	4:14:25	Ray Middleton (GBR)	4:17:15	Ingvar Pettersson (SWE)	4:19:11
Men (Team)
Team	United Kingdom	93 pts	Hungary	64 pts	Sweden	63 pts

== Results ==
=== Men's 20 km ===
Place	Athlete	Nation	Time
1st place, gold medalist(s)	Ken Matthews	Great Britain (GBR)	1:30:10
2nd place, silver medalist(s)	Paul Nihill	Great Britain (GBR)	1:33:18
3rd place, bronze medalist(s)	Antal Kiss	Hungary (HUN)	1:33:38
4	István Göri	Hungary (HUN)	1:34:33
5	Erik Söderlund	Sweden (SWE)	1:35:16
6	John Edgington	Great Britain (GBR)	1:35:22
7	John Ljunggren	Sweden (SWE)	1:35:53
8	Stefano Serchinich	Italy (ITA)	1:36:23
9	Alexander Bílek	Czechoslovakia (TCH)	1:36:28
10	Kurt Schreiber	West Germany (FRG)	1:36:37
11	Vladimír Kánský	Czechoslovakia (TCH)	1:37:29
12	Alberto Carocci	Italy (ITA)	1:40:08
13	Lennart Back	Sweden (SWE)	1:40:38
14	Horst Brüning	West Germany (FRG)	1:42:02
15	Giuseppe Doro	Italy (ITA)	1:42:37
16	Tibor Balajcza	Hungary (HUN)	1:43:43
17	Herbert Staubach	West Germany (FRG)	1:44:24
18	Vilém Švajda	Czechoslovakia (TCH)	1:45:09

=== Men's 50 km ===
Place	Athlete	Nation	Time
1st place, gold medalist(s)	István Havasi	Hungary (HUN)	4:14:25
2nd place, silver medalist(s)	Ray Middleton	Great Britain (GBR)	4:17:15
3rd place, bronze medalist(s)	Ingvar Pettersson	Sweden (SWE)	4:19:11
4	Ladíslav Moc	Czechoslovakia (TCH)	4:23:11
5	Ron Wallwork	Great Britain (GBR)	4:23:46
6	Charley Fogg	Great Britain (GBR)	4:30:16
7	Antonio De Gaetano	Italy (ITA)	4:32:01
8	Roy Syversson	Sweden (SWE)	4:33:09
9	Hannes Koch	West Germany (FRG)	4:39:03
10	Gianni Corsaro	Italy (ITA)	4:41:52
11	Mario Algeri	Italy (ITA)	4:43:07
12	Jan Brandejský	Czechoslovakia (TCH)	4:43:22
13	Ferencz Tesch	Hungary (HUN)	4:43:50
14	Béla Dinesz	Hungary (HUN)	4:44:09
15	Stig Lindberg	Sweden (SWE)	4:46:51
16	Jaroslav Fiala	Czechoslovakia (TCH)	5:00:52
—	Julius Müller	West Germany (FRG)	DQ
—	Bernhard Nermerich	West Germany (FRG)	DQ

=== Team ===
The team rankings, named Lugano Trophy, combined the 20km and 50km events team results.

Place	Country	Points
1st place, gold medalist(s)	United Kingdom	93 pts
2nd place, silver medalist(s)	Hungary	64 pts
3rd place, bronze medalist(s)	Sweden	63 pts
4	Italy	51 pts
5	Czechoslovakia	44 pts
6	West Germany	26 pts

== Participation ==
- Czechoslovakia (6)
- West Germany (6)
- Hungary (6)
- Italy (6)
- Sweden (6)
- United Kingdom (6)

== Qualifying rounds ==
From 1961 to 1985 there were qualifying rounds with the winners proceeding to the final. Hungary progressed to final directly due to an epidemic in Hungary at time of qualifying round.

Countries qualifying for the final are highlighted in green

=== Zone 1 ===
Essen, Federal Republic of Germany, September 22

Rank	Nation	Points
1	West Germany	32 pts
2	Belgium	11 pts

=== Zone 2 ===
Fredrikstad, Norway, August 24/25

Rank	Nation	Points
1	Sweden	48 pts
2	Denmark	26 pts
3	Norway	17 pts

=== Zone 3 ===
Sofia, Bulgaria, September 1

Rank	Nation	Points
1	Czechoslovakia	24 pts
2	Bulgaria	20 pts
3	Hungary	DNS

=== Zone 4 ===
Lausanne, Switzerland, September 7/8

Rank	Nation	Points
1	Italy	30 pts
2	Switzerland	14 pts

=== Zone 5 ===
Challes-les-Eaux, France, September 14/15

Rank	Nation	Points
1	United Kingdom	25 pts
2	France	19 pts
