= 1970 IAAF World Race Walking Cup =

- Organisers: IAAF
- Edition: 5th
- Date: October 10
- Host city: Eschborn, Hessen, Federal Republic of Germany
- Events: 2
- Participation: 60 athletes from 8 nations

The 1970 IAAF World Race Walking Cup was held in Eschborn, Federal Republic of Germany, on October 10, 1970. The event was also known as Lugano Trophy.

Complete results were published.

== Medallists ==
Event	Gold		Silver		Bronze	
Men
20 km walk	Hans-Georg Reimann (GDR)	1:26:55	Vladimir Golubnichiy (URS)	1:27:22	Peter Frenkel (GDR)	1:27:33
50 km walk	Christoph Höhne (GDR)	4:04:36	Veniamin Soldatenko (URS)	4:09:52	Burkhard Leuschke (GDR)	4:11:10
Men (Team)
Team	East Germany	134 pts	Soviet Union	125 pts	West Germany	88 pts

== Results ==
=== Men's 20 km ===
Place	Athlete	Nation	Time
1st place, gold medalist(s)	Hans-Georg Reimann	East Germany (GDR)	1:26:55
2nd place, silver medalist(s)	Vladimir Golubnichiy	Soviet Union (URS)	1:27:22
3rd place, bronze medalist(s)	Peter Frenkel	East Germany (GDR)	1:27:33
4	Nikolay Smaga	Soviet Union (URS)	1:28:09
5	Gennadiy Agapov	Soviet Union (URS)	1:28:25
6	Gerhard Sperling	East Germany (GDR)	1:28:48
7	Wilfried Wesch	West Germany (FRG)	1:30:16
8	Dave Romansky	United States (USA)	1:30:47
9	Tom Dooley	United States (USA)	1:30:50
10	Ron Wallwork	Great Britain (GBR)	1:31:36
11	Bernhard Nermerich	West Germany (FRG)	1:32:14
12	Pasquale Busca	Italy (ITA)	1:32:31
13	Edoardo Quirino	Italy (ITA)	1:32:42
14	Andor Antal	Hungary (HUN)	1:32:50
15	Paul Nihill	Great Britain (GBR)	1:33:10
16	Gabriele Nigro	Italy (ITA)	1:33:53
17	Siegfried Zschiegner	East Germany (GDR)	1:34:01
18	Shaun Lightman	Great Britain (GBR)	1:34:38
19	Heinz Mayr	West Germany (FRG)	1:34:55
20	Stefan Ingvarsson	Sweden (SWE)	1:35:06
21	Lennart Back	Sweden (SWE)	1:35:29
22	Hans Tenggren	Sweden (SWE)	1:35:58
23	Ronald Daniel	United States (USA)	1:37:02
24	Ronald Kulik	United States (USA)	1:37:38
25	Gerd Schuth	West Germany (FRG)	1:38:29
26	Kåre Moen	Sweden (SWE)	1:40:46
27	János Tábori	Hungary (HUN)	1:40:50
28	Robert Hughes	Great Britain (GBR)	1:41:41
29	Sándor Forian	Hungary (HUN)	1:44:09
—	Nicola De Vito	Italy (ITA)	DNF

=== Men's 50 km ===
Place	Athlete	Nation	Time
1st place, gold medalist(s)	Christoph Höhne	East Germany (GDR)	4:04:36
2nd place, silver medalist(s)	Veniamin Soldatenko	Soviet Union (URS)	4:09:52
3rd place, bronze medalist(s)	Burkhard Leuschke	East Germany (GDR)	4:11:10
4	Peter Selzer	East Germany (GDR)	4:11:48
5	Winfried Skotnicki	East Germany (GDR)	4:13:33
6	Yevgeniy Lyungin	Soviet Union (URS)	4:14:50
7	Herbert Meier	West Germany (FRG)	4:15:52
8	Otto Barch	Soviet Union (URS)	4:16:47
9	Horst-Rüdiger Magnor	West Germany (FRG)	4:18:41
10	Örjan Andersson	Sweden (SWE)	4:19:02
11	Ray Middleton	Great Britain (GBR)	4:19:58
12	Antal Kiss	Hungary (HUN)	4:20:31
13	Bernd Kannenberg	West Germany (FRG)	4:21:44
14	Walter Sgardello	Italy (ITA)	4:26:25
15	Bob Dobson	Great Britain (GBR)	4:26:59
16	John Knifton	United States (USA)	4:28:42
17	Domenico Carpentieri	Italy (ITA)	4:31:26
18	Gerhard Weidner	West Germany (FRG)	4:32:52
19	Goetz Klopfer	United States (USA)	4:33:24
20	Stig Lindberg	Sweden (SWE)	4:34:03
21	John Warhurst	Great Britain (GBR)	4:34:31
22	Bob Kitchen	United States (USA)	4:37:54
23	Armando Zambaldo	Italy (ITA)	4:40:17
24	Ken Harding	Great Britain (GBR)	4:42:04
25	Tivadar Schiller	Hungary (HUN)	4:48:22
26	Ingvar Pettersson	Sweden (SWE)	4:53:49
—	István Havasi	Hungary (HUN)	DNF
—	Vittorio Visini	Italy (ITA)	DNF
—	Daniel Björkgren	Sweden (SWE)	DNF
—	Jim Lopes	United States (USA)	DNF

=== Team ===
The team rankings, named Lugano Trophy, combined the 20km and 50km events team results.

Place	Country	Points
1st place, gold medalist(s)	East Germany	134 pts
2nd place, silver medalist(s)	Soviet Union	125 pts
3rd place, bronze medalist(s)	West Germany	88 pts
4	United Kingdom	65 pts
5	Italy	59 pts
6	United States	59 pts
7	Sweden	40 pts
8	Hungary	31 pts
9	India	DNS

== Participation ==
The participation of 60 athletes from 8 countries is reported.

- East Germany (8)
- Hungary (6)
- Italy (8)
- Soviet Union (6)
- Sweden (8)
- United Kingdom (8)
- United States (8)
- West Germany (8)

== Qualifying rounds ==
From 1961 to 1985 there were qualifying rounds with the first two winners proceeding to the final. This year, the German Democratic Republic, the United Kingdom, India, the United States, and the Soviet Union proceeded directly to the final.

Countries qualifying for the final are highlighted in green

=== Zone 1 ===
Odense, Denmark, August 15/16

Rank	Nation	Points
1	West Germany	98 pts
2	Sweden	87 pts
3	France	69 pts
4	Norway	38 pts
5	Denmark	29 pts
6	Belgium	22 pts

=== Zone 2 ===
Dunaújváros, Hungary, August 26/27

Rank	Nation	Points
1	Italy	44 pts
2	Hungary	40 pts
3	Czechoslovakia	39 pts
4	Switzerland	19 pts
5	Poland	DNS
5	Spain	DNS
