= 1965 IAAF World Race Walking Cup =

- Organisers: IAAF
- Edition: 3rd
- Date: October 9–10
- Host city: Pescara, Abruzzo, Italy
- Events: 2
- Participation: 42 athletes from 7 nations

The 1965 IAAF World Race Walking Cup was held in Pescara, Italy, on October 9–10, 1965. The event was also known as Lugano Trophy.

Complete results were published.

== Medallists ==
Event	Gold		Silver		Bronze	
Men
20 km walk	Dieter Lindner (GDR)	1:28:10	Antal Kiss (HUN)	1:29:09	Gerhard Sperling (GDR)	1:31:30
50 km walk	Christoph Höhne (GDR)	4:03:14	Burkhard Leuschke (GDR)	4:06:02	Abdon Pamich (ITA)	4:06:40
Men (Team)
Team	East Germany	117 pts	United Kingdom	87 pts	Hungary	64 pts

== Results ==
=== Men's 20 km ===
Place	Athlete	Nation	Time
1st place, gold medalist(s)	Dieter Lindner	East Germany (GDR)	1:28:10
2nd place, silver medalist(s)	Antal Kiss	Hungary (HUN)	1:29:09
3rd place, bronze medalist(s)	Gerhard Sperling	East Germany (GDR)	1:31:30
4	Peter Fullager	Great Britain (GBR)	1:31:52
5	Hans-Joachim Pathus	East Germany (GDR)	1:32:13
6	Ron Wallwork	Great Britain (GBR)	1:32:41
7	Lennart Back	Sweden (SWE)	1:33:32
8	Karl-Heinz Pape	West Germany (FRG)	1:34:29
9	István Göri	Hungary (HUN)	1:34:42
10	János Dalmati	Hungary (HUN)	1:35:35
11	Vittorio Visini	Italy (ITA)	1:36:11
12	Nicola De Vito	Italy (ITA)	1:37:09
13	Stefan Ingvarsson	Sweden (SWE)	1:37:19
14	Malcolm Tolley	Great Britain (GBR)	1:37:35
15	Jean Bouillon	France (FRA)	1:37:44
16	Hans-Jürgen Paul	West Germany (FRG)	1:38:00
17	Kurt Schreiber	West Germany (FRG)	1:38:10
18	Göte Nygren	Sweden (SWE)	1:38:46
19	Robert Poirier	France (FRA)	1:39:23
20	Guy Bailly	France (FRA)	1:41:18
21	Alfredo Vismara	Italy (ITA)	1:43:18

=== Men's 50 km ===
Place	Athlete	Nation	Time
1st place, gold medalist(s)	Christoph Höhne	East Germany (GDR)	4:03:14
2nd place, silver medalist(s)	Burkhard Leuschke	East Germany (GDR)	4:06:02
3rd place, bronze medalist(s)	Abdon Pamich	Italy (ITA)	4:06:40
4	Don Thompson	Great Britain (GBR)	4:09:14
5	Kurt Sakowski	East Germany (GDR)	4:12:37
6	Ingvar Pettersson	Sweden (SWE)	4:16:57
7	Ray Middleton	Great Britain (GBR)	4:19:14
8	Gilbert Belin	France (FRA)	4:20:11
9	Stig Lindberg	Sweden (SWE)	4:22:30
10	Charley Fogg	Great Britain (GBR)	4:23:24
11	Jacques Arnoux	France (FRA)	4:25:09
12	István Havasi	Hungary (HUN)	4:27:10
13	Hannes Koch	West Germany (FRG)	4:30:42
14	Gerd Schuth	West Germany (FRG)	4:32:14
15	Luigi De Rosso	Italy (ITA)	4:37:18
16	Antonio De Gaetano	Italy (ITA)	4:40:01
17	Béla Dinesz	Hungary (HUN)	4:40:07
18	Ferencz Tesch	Hungary (HUN)	4:43:19
19	Jean Leroy	France (FRA)	4:43:44
20	Kurt Olander	Sweden (SWE)	4:44:52
21	Gerhard Weidner	West Germany (FRG)	4:53:02

=== Team ===
The team rankings, named Lugano Trophy, combined the 20km and 50km events team results.

Place	Country	Points
1st place, gold medalist(s)	East Germany	117 pts
2nd place, silver medalist(s)	United Kingdom	87 pts
3rd place, bronze medalist(s)	Hungary	64 pts
4	Sweden	59 pts
5	Italy	54 pts
6	West Germany	43 pts
7	France	40 pts

== Participation ==
The participation of 42 athletes from 7 countries is reported.

- East Germany (6)
- France (6)
- Hungary (6)
- Italy (6)
- Sweden (6)
- United Kingdom (6)
- West Germany (6)

== Qualifying rounds ==
From 1961 to 1985 there were qualifying rounds with the winners proceeding to the final. This year, United Kingdom, Hungary, and Sweden proceeded directly to the final.

Countries qualifying for the final are highlighted in green

=== Zone 1 ===
Frankfurt am Main, Federal Republic of Germany, August 22

Rank	Nation	Points
1	West Germany	28 pts
2	Belgium	15 pts

=== Zone 2 ===
La Chaux-de-Fonds, Switzerland, August 14/15

Rank	Nation	Points
1	France	28 pts
2	Switzerland	16 pts

=== Zone 3 ===
San Remo, Italy, September 19

Rank	Nation	Points
1	Italy	24 pts
2	Czechoslovakia	17 pts

=== Zone 4 ===
Potsdam, German Democratic Republic, September 19

Rank	Nation	Points
1	East Germany	30 pts
2	Bulgaria	11 pts
