= Athletics at the 1964 Summer Olympics – Men's 50 kilometres walk =

Men's 50 kilometres walk at the Games of the XVIII Olympiad
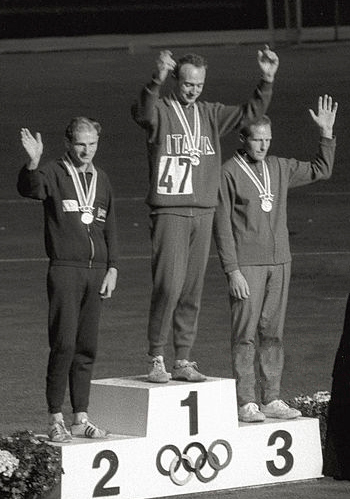
- Paul Nihill, Abdon Pamich and Ingvar Pettersson
- Venue: Olympic Stadium
- Dates: 18 October 1964
- Competitors: 39 from 20 nations
- Winning time: 4:11:12.4 OR

Medalists
| 1st place, gold medalist(s) | | Abdon Pamich | Italy |
| 2nd place, silver medalist(s) | | Paul Nihill | Great Britain |
| 3rd place, bronze medalist(s) | | Ingvar Pettersson | Sweden |

Official Video Highlights @1:39:32 Video on YouTube

The men's 50 kilometres walk was the longer of the two men's race walking events on the Athletics at the 1964 Summer Olympics program in Tokyo, as well as the longest event on the program. It was held on 18 October 1964. 39 athletes from 20 nations entered, with 34 starting and 31 finishing.

== Results ==
12 walkers beat the old Olympic record.

| Place | Athlete | Nation | Time |
|---|---|---|---|
| 1 | Abdon Pamich | Italy | 4:11:12.4 OR |
| 2 | Paul Nihill | Great Britain | 4:11:31.2 |
| 3 | Ingvar Pettersson | Sweden | 4:14:17.4 |
| 4 | Burkhard Leuschke | United Team of Germany | 4:15:26.8 |
| 5 | Bob Gardiner | Australia | 4:17:06.8 |
| 6 | Christoph Höhne | United Team of Germany | 4:17:41.6 |
| 7 | Anatoly Vediakov | Soviet Union | 4:19:55.8 |
| 8 | Kurt Sakowski | United Team of Germany | 4:20:31.0 |
| 9 | Charles Sowa | Luxembourg | 4:20:37.2 |
| 10 | Don Thompson | Great Britain | 4:22:39.4 |
| 11 | Ronald Crawford | Australia | 4:24:19.6 |
| 12 | Gennady Agapov | Soviet Union | 4:24:34.0 |
| 13 | Ray Middleton | Great Britain | 4:25:49.2 |
| 14 | Alex Oakley | Canada | 4:27:24.6 |
| 15 | Henri Delerue | France | 4:27:47.6 |
| 16 | John Ljunggren | Sweden | 4:29:09.2 |
| 17 | Ted Allsopp | Australia | 4:31:07.8 |
| 18 | Eugeny Liungin | Soviet Union | 4:32:01.6 |
| 19 | István Havasi | Hungary | 4:34:14.0 |
| 20 | Alexander Bilek | Czechoslovakia | 4:34:54.2 |
| 21 | Christopher McCarthy | United States | 4:35:41.6 |
| 22 | Tadamasa Ejiri | Japan | 4:37:31.8 |
| 23 | Erwin Stütz | Switzerland | 4:40:45.0 |
| 24 | Malkolm Roy Syversson | Sweden | 4:41:47.6 |
| 25 | Kazuo Saito | Japan | 4:43:01.0 |
| 26 | Bruce MacDonald | United States | 4:45:10.4 |
| 27 | Sumio Miwa | Japan | 4:52:00.6 |
| 28 | Ilie Popa | Romania | 4:57:40.8 |
| 29 | Mike Brodie | United States | 4:57:41.0 |
| 30 | Chedli El Marghni | Tunisia | 4:59:13.0 |
| 31 | So Kam Tong | Hong Kong | 5:07:53.2 |
| — | Maung Rajan | Burma | Did not finish 1:48:39 at 20 km |
| — | Mieczysław Rutyna | Poland | Disqualified; 1:17:08 at 15 km |
| — | Naceur Ben Messaoud | Tunisia | Disqualified; 0:24:34 at 5 km |
| — | Emil Dragan | Romania | Did not start |
| — | Istvan Gori | Hungary | Did not start |
| — | Kim Tai Koo | North Korea | Did not start |
| — | Antal Kiss | Hungary | Did not start |
| — | Pak Tai Keun | North Korea | Did not start |
