= Athletics at the 1968 Summer Olympics – Men's 50 kilometres walk =

Men's 50 kilometres walk at the Games of the XIX Olympiad
- Venue: Estadio Olímpico Universitario
- Date: October 17, 1968
- Competitors: 36 from 19 nations
- Winning time: 4:20:13.6

Medalists
1st place, gold medalist(s)		Christoph Höhne	East Germany
2nd place, silver medalist(s)		Antal Kiss	Hungary
3rd place, bronze medalist(s)		Larry Young	United States

The men's 50 kilometres race walk at the 1968 Summer Olympics in Mexico City, Mexico was held on October 17. It was won by Christoph Höhne of East Germany.

== Records ==
Prior to this event, the world and Olympic records stood as follows:

World record	Gennadiy Agapov (URS)	3:55:36	Almaty, Soviet Union	October 17, 1965
Olympic record	Abdon Pamich (ITA)	4:11:12	Tokyo, Japan	October 18, 1964

== Result ==
Rank	Athlete	Nation	Time
1st place, gold medalist(s)	Christoph Höhne	East Germany	4:20:13.6
2nd place, silver medalist(s)	Antal Kiss	Hungary	4:30:17.0
3rd place, bronze medalist(s)	Larry Young	United States	4:31:55.4
4	Peter Selzer	East Germany	4:33:09.8
5	Stig Lindberg	Sweden	4:34:05.0
6	Vittorio Visini	Italy	4:36:33.2
7	Bryan Eley	Great Britain	4:37:32.2
8	José Pedraza	Mexico	4:37:51.4
9	Karl-Heinz Merschenz	Canada	4:37:57.4
10	Goetz Klopfer	United States	4:39:13.8
11	Horst-Rüdiger Magnor	West Germany	4:39:43.2
12	Frank Clark	Australia	4:40:13.8
13	Örjan Andersson	Sweden	4:40:42.6
14	Gerhard Weidner	West Germany	4:43:26.2
15	Sergey Grigoryev	Soviet Union	4:44:39.2
16	Charles Sowa	Luxembourg	4:44:45.2
17	Kazuo Saito	Japan	4:47:29.6
18	Shaun Lightman	Great Britain	4:52:20.0
19	Bob Gardiner	Australia	4:52:29.0
20	Erwin Stütz	Switzerland	4:53:33.8
21	Henri Delerue	France	4:57:40.2
22	Mieczysław Rutyna	Poland	4:58:03.8
23	Felix Cappella	Canada	4:58:31.6
24	Shaul Ladany	Israel	5:01:06.0
25	Pablo Colín	Mexico	5:01:30.0
26	Dave Romansky	United States	5:38:03.4
27	Ismael Hernández	Mexico	5:56:09.2
28	Ricardo Cruz	El Salvador	5:56:22.0
	Bernhard Nermerich	West Germany	DSQ
	Abdon Pamich	Italy	DNF
	Burkhard Leuschke	East Germany	DNF
	Gennady Agapov	Soviet Union	DNF
	Ihor Della-Rossa	Soviet Union	DNF
	John Kelly	Ireland	DNF
	Paul Nihill	Great Britain	DNF
	Stefan Ingvarsson	Sweden	DNF
	József Csermák	Hungary	DNS
	Euclides Calzado	Cuba	DNS
	Katsuo Nishida	Japan	DNS
	Carlos Vanegas	Nicaragua	DNS
