= Athletics at the 1964 Summer Olympics – Men's 20 kilometres walk =

Men's 20 kilometres walk at the Games of the XVIII Olympiad
- Venue: Olympic Stadium
- Dates: 15 October 1964
- Competitors: 35 from 15 nations
- Winning time: 1:29:34.0 OR

Medalists
1st place, gold medalist(s)		Ken Matthews	Great Britain
2nd place, silver medalist(s)		Dieter Lindner	United Team of Germany
3rd place, bronze medalist(s)		Vladimir Golubnichy	Soviet Union

The men's 20 kilometres walk was the shorter of the two men's racewalking events on the Athletics at the 1964 Summer Olympics program in Tokyo. It was held on 15 October 1964. 35 athletes from 15 nations entered, with 30 starting and 26 finishing.

== Results ==
Matthews and Lindner both beat the old best Olympic time.

Rank	Athlete	Nation	Time	Time behind	Notes
1st place, gold medalist(s)	Ken Matthews	Great Britain	1:29:34.0		OB
2nd place, silver medalist(s)	Dieter Lindner	United Team of Germany	1:31:13.2		
3rd place, bronze medalist(s)	Volodymyr Holubnychy	Soviet Union	1:31:59.4		
4	Noel Freeman	Australia	1:32:06.8		
5	Gennadiy Solodov	Soviet Union	1:32:33.0		
6	Ron Zinn	United States	1:32:43.0		
7	Boris Khrolovich	Soviet Union	1:32:45.4		
8	John Edgington	Great Britain	1:32:46.0		
9	Gerhard Sperling	United Team of Germany	1:33:15.8		
10	John Chester Paddick	Great Britain	1:33:28.4		
11	Alexander Bílek	Czechoslovakia	1:33:45		
12	Hans-Georg Reimann	United Team of Germany	1:34:51.0		
13	Henri Delerue	France	1:34:58		
14	Tommy Kristensen	Denmark	1:35:30		
15	István Göri	Hungary	1:35:38		
16	Charles Sowa	Luxembourg	1:36:16		
17	Jack Mortland	United States	1:36:35		
18	Åke Söderlund	Sweden	1:36:53		
19	John Artur Ljunggren	Sweden	1:37:03		
20	Roine Karlsson	Sweden	1:37:07		
21	Antal Kiss	Hungary	1:38:27		
22	Ronald John Crawford	Australia	1:38:47		
23	Noboru Ishiguro	Japan	1:39:40		
24	Chedli El-Marghni	Tunisia	1:41:11		
25	Kiue Kuribayashi	Japan	1:43:07		
26	Mieczysław Rutyna	Poland	1:48:41		
—	Robert Charles Gardiner	Australia	DNF		1:12:29 at 15 km
—	Alex Harold Oakley	Canada	DNF		0:47:25 at 10 km
—	Ronald Owen Laird	United States	DSQ		1:11:31 at 15 km
—	Yasuo Naito	Japan	DSQ		0:23:43 at 5 km
—	Naceur Ben Messaoud	Tunisia	DNS		
—	Elias Baruh	Romania	DNS		
—	István Havasi	Hungary	DNS		
—	Andrei Savescu	Romania	DNS		
