= 1966 European Athletics Championships – Men's 50 kilometres walk =

Men's 50 kilometres walk at the European Athletics Championships

The men's 50 kilometres race walk at the 1966 European Athletics Championships was held in Budapest, Hungary, on 3 September 1966.

== Medalists ==
Gold	Abdon Pamich; Italy
Silver	Gennadiy Agapov; Soviet Union
Bronze	Oleksandr Shcherbyna; Soviet Union

== Results ==
=== Final ===
3 September

Rank	Name	Nationality	Time	Notes
1st place, gold medalist(s)	Abdon Pamich	Italy	4:18:42.0	
2nd place, silver medalist(s)	Gennadiy Agapov	Soviet Union	4:20:01.2	
3rd place, bronze medalist(s)	Oleksandr Shcherbyna	Soviet Union	4:20:47.2	
4	Kurt Sakowski	East Germany	4:21:35.0	
5	Ray Middleton	Great Britain	4:23:01.0	
6	Henri Delerue	France	4:24:37.4	
7	Günther Rieger	East Germany	4:25:50.8	
8	Vittorio Visini	Italy	4:26:22.4	
9	Donald Thompson	Great Britain	4:27:11.2	
10	Charles Sowa	Luxembourg	4:30:13.6	
11	Peter Selzer	East Germany	4:33:57.4	
12	István Havasi	Hungary	4:35:11.0	
13	Alexandr Bílek	Czechoslovakia	4:36:59.8	
14	Erwin Stutz	Switzerland	4:37:51.4	
15	Bernhard Nermerich	West Germany	4:39:04.8	
16	Stig Lindberg	Sweden	4:40:39.8	
17	Anatoliy Penek	Soviet Union	4:41:23.2	
18	Gerhard Weidner	West Germany	4:44:04.2	
19	Charles Fogg	Great Britain	4:45:16.6	
20	Oldřich Stránský	Czechoslovakia	4:49:57.8	
21	Eugeniusz Ornoch	Poland	4:56:13.4	
22	Werner Hupfeld	West Germany	5:02:41.8	
	Ingvar Pettersson	Sweden	DNF	
	Jacques Arnoux	France	DNF	
	Béla Dinesz	Hungary	DQ	
	Max Sjöholm	Sweden	DQ	

== Participation ==
According to an unofficial count, 26 athletes from 12 countries participated in the event.

- Czechoslovakia (2)
- East Germany (3)
- France (2)
- Hungary (2)
- Italy (2)
- Luxembourg (1)
- Poland (1)
- Soviet Union (3)
- Sweden (3)
- Switzerland (1)
- Great Britain (3)
- West Germany (3)
