= 1961 IAAF World Race Walking Cup =

- Organisers: IAAF
- Edition: 1st
- Date: 15–16 October
- Host city: Lugano, Ticino, Switzerland
- Events: 2
- Participation: 24 athletes from 4 nations

The 1961 IAAF World Race Walking Cup was held in Lugano, Ticino, Switzerland, on October 15–16, 1961. The event was also known as Lugano Trophy.

Complete results were published.

== Medallists ==
Event	Gold		Silver		Bronze	
Men
20 km walk	Ken Matthews (GBR)	1:30:55	Lennart Back (SWE)	1:32:12	George Williams (GBR)	1:34:02
50 km walk	Abdon Pamich (ITA)	4:25:38	Don Thompson (GBR)	4:30:35	Åke Söderlund (SWE)	4:36:48
Men (Team)
Team	United Kingdom	53 pts	Sweden	53 pts	Italy	28 pts

== Results ==
=== Men's 20 km ===
Place	Athlete	Nation	Time
1st place, gold medalist(s)	Ken Matthews	Great Britain (GBR)	1:30:55
2nd place, silver medalist(s)	Lennart Back	Sweden (SWE)	1:32:12
3rd place, bronze medalist(s)	George Williams	Great Britain (GBR)	1:34:02
4	John Ljunggren	Sweden (SWE)	1:34:22
5	Erik Söderlund	Sweden (SWE)	1:35:17
6	Tibor Balajcza	Hungary (HUN)	1:36:17
7	Bob Clark	Great Britain (GBR)	1:36:52
8	Giuseppe Dordoni	Italy (ITA)	1:37:17
9	Antal Kiss	Hungary (HUN)	1:37:39
10	István Göri	Hungary (HUN)	1:39:06
11	Gianni Corsaro	Italy (ITA)	1:42:46
—	Stefano Serchinich	Italy (ITA)	DNF

=== Men's 50 km ===
Place	Athlete	Nation	Time
1st place, gold medalist(s)	Abdon Pamich	Italy (ITA)	4:25:38
2nd place, silver medalist(s)	Don Thompson	Great Britain (GBR)	4:30:35
3rd place, bronze medalist(s)	Åke Söderlund	Sweden (SWE)	4:36:48
4	Ray Middleton	Great Britain (GBR)	4:39:24
5	Ingvar Green	Sweden (SWE)	4:42:27
6	Evert Leonardsson	Sweden (SWE)	4:43:25
7	István Havasi	Hungary (HUN)	4:46:59
8	Luigi De Rosso	Italy (ITA)	4:49:22
9	Charley Fogg	Great Britain (GBR)	4:49:22
10	Antonio De Gaetano	Italy (ITA)	5:05:02
11	Géza Szabó	Hungary (HUN)	5:12:57
12	Béla Dinesz	Hungary (HUN)	5:13:03

=== Team ===
From this edition up to 1997, the team ranking was named Lugano Trophy and combined the results of the 20km and 50km races.

Place	Country	Points
1st place, gold medalist(s)	United Kingdom	53 pts
2nd place, silver medalist(s)	Sweden	53 pts
3rd place, bronze medalist(s)	Italy	28 pts
4	Hungary	23 pts

== Participation ==
- Hungary (6)
- Italy (6)
- Sweden (6)
- United Kingdom (6)

== Qualifying rounds ==
From 1961 to 1985 there were qualifying rounds with the winners proceeding to the final.

Countries qualifying for the final are highlighted in green

=== Zone 1 ===
London, United Kingdom, August 12

Rank	Nation	Points
1	United Kingdom	41 pts
2	Germany^{†}	39 pts
3	Belgium	12 pts

^{†}: Combined East and West German Team.

=== Zone 2 ===
København, Denmark, August 26/27

Rank	Nation	Points
1	Sweden	50 pts
2	Denmark	23 pts
3	Norway	18 pts

=== Zone 3 ===
Spoleto, Italy, September 3

Rank	Nation	Points
1	Italy	48 pts
2	France	27 pts
3	Switzerland	17 pts

=== Zone 4 ===
Cancelled

Rank	Nation	Points
1	Hungary	
2	Turkey	DNS
