= 1966 European Athletics Championships – Men's 20 kilometres walk =

Men's 20 kilometres walk at the European Athletics Championships

The men's 20 kilometres race walk at the 1966 European Athletics Championships was held in Budapest, Hungary, on 30 August 1966.

== Medalists ==
Gold	Dieter Lindner; East Germany
Silver	Volodymyr Holubnychy; Soviet Union
Bronze	Nikolay Smaga; Soviet Union

== Results ==
=== Final ===
30 August

Rank	Name	Nationality	Time	Notes
1st place, gold medalist(s)	Dieter Lindner	East Germany	1:29:25.0	CR
2nd place, silver medalist(s)	Volodymyr Holubnychy	Soviet Union	1:30:06.0	
3rd place, bronze medalist(s)	Nikolay Smaga	Soviet Union	1:30:18.0	
4	Gerhard Sperling	East Germany	1:31:25.8	
5	Anatoly Vedyakov	Soviet Union	1:32:00.8	
6	Antal Kiss	Hungary	1:32:42.4	
7	Peter Fullager	Great Britain	1:33:02.4	
8	Henri Delerue	France	1:33:41.2	
9	Ron Wallwork	Great Britain	1:34:38.0	
10	János Dalmati	Hungary	1:34:42.6	
11	Karl-Heinz Pape	West Germany	1:34:48.0	
12	Charles Sowa	Luxembourg	1:34:50.0	
13	John Webb	Great Britain	1:34:52.0	
14	Nicola de Vito	Italy	1:37:07.6	
15	Stefan Ingvarsson	Sweden	1:38:39.0	
16	Andrzej Czapliński	Poland	1:40:41.0	
17	Edmund Paziewski	Poland	1:40:56.0	
18	Göte Nygren	Sweden	1:41:22.0	
19	Lennart Larsson	Sweden	1:42:20.0	
20	Sadik Demiraj	Albania	1:45:33.0	
	Alexandr Bílek	Czechoslovakia	DNF	
	István Göri	Hungary	DNF	
	Eugeniusz Ornoch	Poland	DNF	
	Jacques Arnoux	France	DQ	
	Stanimir Stoykov	Bulgaria	DQ	
	Hans-Georg Reimann	East Germany	DQ	
	Dimitar Georgiev	Bulgaria	DQ	

== Participation ==
According to an unofficial count, 27 athletes from 13 countries participated in the event.

- Albania (1)
- Bulgaria (2)
- Czechoslovakia (1)
- East Germany (3)
- France (2)
- Hungary (3)
- Italy (1)
- Luxembourg (1)
- Poland (3)
- Soviet Union (3)
- Sweden (3)
- Great Britain (3)
- West Germany (1)
