= 1971 European Athletics Championships – Men's 20 kilometres walk =

Men's 20 kilometres walk at the European Athletics Championships

The men's 20 kilometres race walk at the 1971 European Athletics Championships was held in Helsinki, Finland, on 10 August 1971.

== Medalists ==
Gold	Nikolay Smaga; Soviet Union
Silver	Gerhard Sperling; East Germany
Bronze	Paul Nihill; Great Britain

== Results ==
=== Final ===
10 August

Rank	Name	Nationality	Time	Notes
1st place, gold medalist(s)	Nikolay Smaga	Soviet Union	1:27:20.2	CR
2nd place, silver medalist(s)	Gerhard Sperling	East Germany	1:27:29.0	
3rd place, bronze medalist(s)	Paul Nihill	Great Britain	1:27:34.8	
4	Peter Frenkel	East Germany	1:27:52.8	
5	Hans-Georg Reimann	East Germany	1:28:56.8	
6	Phil Embleton	Great Britain	1:29:31.6	
7	Boris Yakovlev	Soviet Union	1:29:49.4	
8	Yevgeniy Ivchenko	Soviet Union	1:31:32.2	
9	Bernhard Kannenberg	West Germany	1:32:06.4	
10	Pasquale Busca	Italy	1:32:44.2	
11	Antal Kiss	Hungary	1:33:15.4	
12	Charles Sowa	Luxembourg	1:33:54.6	
13	Charles Sutherland	Great Britain	1:34:15.0	
14	Andor Antal	Hungary	1:35:09.6	
15	Sándor Fórián	Hungary	1:35:24.2	
16	Kåre Moen	Norway	1:35:28.2	
17	Jan Ornoch	Poland	1:35:33.4	
18	Stefan Ingvarsson	Sweden	1:36:17.2	
19	Hans Tenggren	Sweden	1:36:54.8	
20	Wilfried Wesch	West Germany	1:37:39.4	
21	Jan Rolstad	Norway	1:39:14.8	
22	Kjell Lund	Norway	1:40:28.6	

== Participation ==
According to an unofficial count, 22 athletes from 10 countries participated in the event.

- East Germany (3)
- Hungary (3)
- Italy (1)
- Luxembourg (1)
- Norway (3)
- Poland (1)
- Soviet Union (3)
- Sweden (2)
- Great Britain (3)
- West Germany (2)
