= Borys Yakovlev =

Personal information
- Born: 16 July 1945 Petrovsk, Russian SFSR
- Died: 23 June 2014 (aged 68)
- Height: 1.73 m (5 ft 8 in)
- Weight: 63 kg (139 lb)

Sport
- Sport: Athletics
- Event: Race walking
Medal record
Representing Soviet Union
IAAF World Race Walking Cup
Silver medal – second place	1979 Eschborn	20 km walk

Borys Yakovlev (Ukrainian: Борис Яковлев, Russian: Борис Александрович Яковлев,Boris Aleksandrovich Yakovlev; 16 July 1945 – 23 June 2014) was a Soviet-Ukrainian race walker.

== Career ==
Yakovlev competed in both the 20 km walk and the 50 km walk. He represented the Soviet Union at 20 km in the European Athletics Championships of 1969, 1971 and 1978, always placing in the top eight with a best result of fourth place in 1978. At the 1980 Summer Olympics he competed at the longer distance, but failed to finish.

Track & Field News ranked Yakovlev in the world's top 10 at 20 kilometres four times between 1970 (the first year walkers were ranked) and 1979, when his ranking peaked at #3. In 1979 he placed third behind fellow Ukrainians Mykola Vynnychenko and Anatoliy Solomin at the Soviet Spartakiad and second behind Mexico's Daniel Bautista at the 1979 IAAF World Race Walking Cup; he was ranked behind Bautista and another Mexican, Domingo Colín, and ahead of the other top Soviets.

Yakovlev later became a coach in Ukraine.
