= 1962 European Athletics Championships – Men's 20 kilometres walk =

Men's 20 kilometres walk at the European Athletics Championships

The men's 20 kilometres race walk at the 1962 European Athletics Championships was held in Belgrade, then Yugoslavia, on 12 September 1962.

== Medalists ==
Gold	Kenneth Matthews; Great Britain
Silver	Hans-Georg Reimann; East Germany
Bronze	Volodymyr Holubnychy; Soviet Union

== Results ==
=== Final ===
12 September

Rank	Name	Nationality	Time	Notes
1st place, gold medalist(s)	Kenneth Matthews	Great Britain	1:35:54.8	
2nd place, silver medalist(s)	Hans-Georg Reimann	East Germany	1:36:14.2	
3rd place, bronze medalist(s)	Volodymyr Holubnychy	Soviet Union	1:36:37.6	
4	Anatoly Vedyakov	Soviet Union	1:37:23.6	
5	Lennart Back	Sweden	1:38:16.2	
6	Dieter Lindner	East Germany	1:38:34.8	
7	Alexandr Bílek	Czechoslovakia	1:38:42.6	
8	Franciszek Szyszka	Poland	1:40:30.8	
9	Erik Söderlund	Sweden	1:40:45.4	
10	Charles Sowa	Luxembourg	1:41:24.2	
11	Robert Clark	Great Britain	1:41:30.0	
12	Henri Delerue	France	1:41:58.2	
13	Joël Vanderhaegen	Belgium	1:42:31.8	
14	Karl-Heinz Pape	West Germany	1:45:39.8	
15	Arthur Thomson	Great Britain	1:50:08.2	
16	Ozbi Vister	Yugoslavia	1:56:21.4	
	Stavros Hadjilaios	Greece	DNF	
	Sezer Selek	Turkey	DNF	
	Tommy Kristensen	Denmark	DQ	

== Participation ==
According to an unofficial count, 19 athletes from 14 countries participated in the event.

- Belgium (1)
- Denmark (1)
- Czechoslovakia (1)
- East Germany (2)
- France (1)
- Greece (1)
- Luxembourg (1)
- Poland (1)
- Soviet Union (2)
- Sweden (2)
- Turkey (1)
- Great Britain (3)
- West Germany (1)
- Yugoslavia (1)
