= Ray Middleton (race walker) =

British racewalker (1936–2023)

Personal information
- Nationality: British (English)
- Born: 9 August 1936 Marylebone, England
- Died: 8 January 2023 (aged 86)
- Height: 190 cm (6 ft 3 in)
- Weight: 87 kg (192 lb)

Sport
- Sport: Athletics
- Event: racewalking
- Club: Belgrave Harriers
Medal record
Representing Great Britain
IAAF World Race Walking Cup
Silver medal – second place	1963 Varese	50 km walk
Representing England
British Empire and Commonwealth Games
Silver medal – second place	1966 Kingston	20 mi walk

Raymond Christopher Middleton (9 August 1936 – 8 January 2023) was a British racewalker. He represented Great Britain at the 1964 Summer Olympics in the 50 kilometres race walk. He was also a six-time participant at the IAAF World Race Walking Cup between 1961 and 1973. He took silver medals at the 1963 IAAF World Race Walking Cup (behind István Havasi) and 1966 British Empire and Commonwealth Games (behind Ron Wallwork).

== Biography ==
Born in Marylebone, Middleton was a high jumper and half-miler at school. He joined Belgrave Harriers athletics club and began competing internationally for Great Britain in his twenties. He competed at the European Athletics Championships on three occasions (1962, 1966, 1969) with his best placing at that competition being fifth (achieved in both 1966 and 1969).

Nationally, he had much success at the Race Walking Association championships. He won the 50 km title in 1963 as well as being runner-up in 1965, 1964, 1966, 1967 and 1970. He placed in the top three on five occasions over the 20-mile championship distance. He also was third in the 7-mile race at the 1962 AAA Championships.

By trade, Middleton was a London Post Office worker and won the 1970 European Postal Road Walking Championships.

Middleton died of respiratory failure following an infection, on 8 January 2023, at the age of 86.

== International competitions ==
Year	Competition	Venue	Position	Event	Notes
1961	IAAF World Race Walking Cup	Lugano, Switzerland	4th	50 km walk	4:39:24
1962	European Championships	Belgrade, Yugoslavia	—	50 km walk	DQ
1963	IAAF World Race Walking Cup	Varese, Italy	2nd	50 km walk	4:17:15
1964	Olympic Games	Tokyo, Japan	13th	50 km walk	4:25:49.2
1965	IAAF World Race Walking Cup	Pescara, Italy	7th	50 km walk	4:19:14
1966	British Empire and Commonwealth Games	Kingston, Jamaica	2nd	20 mi walk	2:45:19
1966	European Championships	Budapest, Hungary	5th	50 km walk	4:23:01.0
1967	IAAF World Race Walking Cup	Bad Saarow, East Germany	8th	50 km walk	4:29:23
1969	European Championships	Athens, Greece	5th	50 km walk	4:27:00.0
1970	IAAF World Race Walking Cup	Eschborn, West Germany	11th	50 km walk	4:19:58
1973	IAAF World Race Walking Cup	Lugano, Switzerland	19th	50 km walk	4:22:25
