= George Williams (race walker) =

British racewalker

Personal information
- Nationality: British (English)
- Born: 1935
- Died: 24 December 2016 (aged 80–81)

Sport
- Sport: Athletics
- Event: xx
Medal record
Representing Great Britain
IAAF World Race Walking Cup
Bronze medal – third place	1961 Lugano	20 km walk

George Williams (1935 – 24 December 2016) was a British racewalking athlete.

== Biography ==
Williams finished third behind George Coleman in the 2 miles walk event at the 1955 AAA Championships, finished third behind Bob Goodall in the 1956 AAA Championships and third behind Ken Matthews at the 1959 AAA Championships.

Williams won the bronze medal in the 20 kilometres race walk at the inaugural 1961 IAAF World Race Walking Cup. He was one of three Britons to medal at the event, the others being Ken Matthews and Don Thompson – both went on to win Olympic titles.

He retired from the sport in his twenties, though Paul Nihill (an Olympic and European medallist) credited Williams with his successful approach to training methods in the developing sport. Williams published an autobiography, Run, Rabbit, Run, Rabbit, Run, Run, Run, in 2010 covering his sporting exploits. He died on 24 December at the age of 81.
