= 1969 European Athletics Championships – Men's 20 kilometres walk =

Men's 20 kilometres walk at the European Athletics Championships

The men's 20 kilometres race walk at the 1969 European Athletics Championships was held in Athens, Greece, on 16 September 1969.

== Medalists ==
Gold	Paul Nihill; Great Britain
Silver	Leonida Caraiosifoglu; Romania
Bronze	Nikolay Smaga; Soviet Union

== Results ==
=== Final ===
16 September

Rank	Name	Nationality	Time	Notes
1st place, gold medalist(s)	Paul Nihill	Great Britain	1:30:48.0	
2nd place, silver medalist(s)	Leonida Caraiosifoglu	Romania	1:31:06.4	
3rd place, bronze medalist(s)	Nikolay Smaga	Soviet Union	1:31:20.2	
4	Gerhard Sperling	East Germany	1:32:04.0	
5	Hans-Georg Reimann	East Germany	1:33:04.0	
6	Abdon Pamich	Italy	1:34:15.0	
7	Boris Yakovlev	Soviet Union	1:35:19.0	
8	John Webb	Great Britain	1:35:51.0	
9	Stefan Ingvarsson	Sweden	1:36:26.8	
10	Pasquale Busca	Italy	1:37:11.0	
11	Victor Schuch	Romania	1:37:42.0	
12	Gabriele Nigro	Italy	1:38:15.0	
13	Peter Fullager	Great Britain	1:38:24.0	
14	Vasile Ilie	Romania	1:43:23.0	
15	János Dalmati	Hungary	1:43:53.8	
16	Kjell Lund	Norway	1:45:22.4	
17	Edmund Paziewski	Poland	1:46:45.8	
18	Helge Abrahamsen	Norway	1:47:37.4	
19	Robert Rinchard	Belgium	1:50:25.6	
	Charles Sowa	Luxembourg	DQ	
	Gennadiy Agapov	Soviet Union	DQ	

== Participation ==
According to an unofficial count, 21 athletes from 11 countries participated in the event.

- Belgium (1)
- East Germany (2)
- Hungary (1)
- Italy (3)
- Luxembourg (1)
- Norway (2)
- Poland (1)
- Romania (3)
- Soviet Union (3)
- Sweden (1)
- Great Britain (3)
