= Mykola Vynnychenko =

Medal record

Representing Soviet Union

European Junior Championships
| Gold medal – first place | 1977 Athens | 10,000 m walk |
| Bronze medal – third place | 1975 Athens | 10,000 m walk |

IAAF World Race Walking Cup
| Bronze medal – third place | 1979 Eschborn | 20 km walk |

Mykola Alekseyevich Vynnychenko (Russian: Николай Алексеевич Винниченко; born 12 November 1958) is a former Soviet Ukrainian race walker.

Vinnichenko won bronze in men's 10,000 m walk at the 1975 European Junior Championships as a 16-year-old. He was still eligible to compete as a junior in the 1977 championships in Donetsk, and won in the meeting record time of 41:31.6.

In 1979 Vinnichenko won the 20 kilometres race walk at the Soviet Spartakiad, ahead of Anatoliy Solomin and Boris Yakovlev; his time of 1:22:29.0 was a new championship record. Later that year he placed third behind Mexico's Daniel Bautista and Yakovlev in the IAAF Race Walking Cup; his time of 1:20:05 would have been his personal best and well under the previous world record of Reima Salonen, but the measurement of the course was questionable. Track & Field News ranked him fourth in the world at 20 km that year, behind Bautista, Mexico's Domingo Colín and Yakovlev.

Vinnichenko repeated as Soviet champion in 1980 (as his victory at the 1979 Spartakiad also counted as a national title); his time of 1:21:47 was again a meeting record, and he was ranked seventh in the world despite not competing at the Olympics. Vinnichenko won his third Soviet national title at the 1983 Spartakiad.

== National titles ==
- Soviet Athletics Championships
  - 20 km walk: 1979, 1980, 1983
