= Solodov =

Solodov (Russian: Солодов) is a Russian masculine surname, its feminine counterpart is Solodova. It may refer to

- Gennady Solodov (1934–2020), Russian racewalker
- Viktor Solodov (born 1962), Russian weightlifter
