= Ilie Popa =

Ilie Popa may refer to:

- Ilie Popa (racewalker), Romanian racewalker
- Ilie Popa (mathematician) (1907–1983), Romanian mathematician
