= Ronald Wallwork =

Ronald Wallwork may refer to:

- Ron Wallwork (born 1941), British racewalker
- Ronnie Wallwork (born 1977), English footballer
