= John Paddick =

British racewalker

John Chester Paddick (born 31 August 1943 in Newcastle-under-Lyme, England) was a British athlete. In 1964, he represented Great Britain and Northern Ireland in the Tokyo Olympics in the men's 20 kilometre walk event and came 10th overall with a time of 1 hour, 33 minutes and 28.4 seconds. He was just under four minutes behind the winner, Ken Matthews.

He currently lives in Redcar, North Yorkshire. He is married to Spanish wife Concepcion and has two daughters.
