= Sergey Grigoryev =

Sergey Grigoryev may refer to:

- Sergey Grigoryev (pole vaulter) (born 1992), Kazakhstani athlete
- Sergey Grigoryev (racewalker) (born 1937), Soviet athlete
