= Ismael Hernández (disambiguation) =

Ismael Hernández (born 1964) is a Mexican politician who served as governor of Durango from 2004 to 2010.

Ismael Hernández may also refer to:

- Ismael Hernández (athlete) (born 1946), Mexican racewalker
- Ismael Hernández (pentathlete) (born 1990), Mexican modern pentathlete
- Ismael Hernandez Vallejo, convicted Mexican criminal, accomplice in the killing of United States Border Patrol agent Javier Vega Jr.
