= Sumio Miwa =

Japanese racewalker

Personal information
- Nationality: Japanese
- Born: 25 July 1932 (age 93)

Sport
- Sport: Athletics
- Event: Racewalking

Sumio Miwa (三輪 寿美雄, Miwa Sumio; born 25 July 1932) is a Japanese racewalker. He competed in the men's 50 kilometres walk at the 1964 Summer Olympics.
