= Bryan Eley =

British racewalker

Personal information
- Nationality: British
- Born: 28 January 1939 (age 87)

Sport
- Sport: Athletics
- Event: Racewalking

Bryan Eley (born 28 January 1939) is a British racewalker. He competed in the men's 50 kilometres walk at the 1968 Summer Olympics.
