= Men's 20 kilometres walk world record progression =

The following table shows the world record progression in the men's 20 kilometres race walk, as recognised by the IAAF. Notice that the records for road walk and track walk are considered separately.

== World record progression ==
Ratified
Not ratified
Ratified but later rescinded
Pending ratification

Time	Athlete	Date	Place
1:38:43	Hermann Müller (GER)	1911-10-04	Berlin, Germany
1:37:57	Emile Anthoine (FRA)	1913-07-13	Paris, France
1:34:15	Václav Balšán (TCH)	1933-08-13	Český Brod, Czechoslovakia
1:33:25	Fritz Bleiweiss (GER)	1936-06-07	Fürstenwalde, Germany
1:32:12	John Mikaelsson (SWE)	1937-05-30	Malmö, Sweden
1:31:44	John Mikaelsson (SWE)	1946-06-10	Stockholm, Sweden
1:31:21	Josef Doležal (TCH)	1955-06-05	Prague, Czechoslovakia
1:30:36	Volodymyr Holubnychy (URS)	1955-09-23	Kiev, Soviet Union
1:30:00	Josef Doležal (TCH)	1956-07-25	Prague, Czechoslovakia
1:28:39	Valentin Guk (URS)	1957-04-13	Kiev, Soviet Union
1:27:29	Leonid Spirin (URS)	1959-07-07	Moscow, Soviet Union
1:27:04	Volodymyr Holubnychy (URS)	1959-07-15	Moscow, Soviet Union
1:25:58	Anatoly Vedyakov (URS)	1959-09-06	Moscow, Soviet Union
1:25:22	Gennadiy Agapov (URS)	1968-07-21	Leningrad, Soviet Union
1:25:19	Gennadiy Agapov (URS)	1972-05-07	Berlin, Germany
1:24:50	Paul Nihill (GBR)	1972-07-30	Munich, Germany
1:23:40	Daniel Bautista (MEX)	1976-05-30	Bydgoszcz, Poland
1:23:30	Anatoliy Solomin (URS)	1978-07-19	Vilnius, Soviet Union
1:23:12	Roland Wieser (GDR)	1978-08-30	Prague, Czechoslovakia
1:22:19	Vadim Tsvetkov (URS)	1979-05-13	Klaipėda, Soviet Union
1:22:16	Daniel Bautista (MEX)	1979-05-19	Valencia, Spain
1:21:04	Daniel Bautista (MEX)	1979-06-09	Vretstorp, Sweden
1:21:01	Reima Salonen (FIN)	1979-06-09	Raisio, Finland
1:21:00	Daniel Bautista (MEX)	1980-03-30	Xalapa, Mexico
1:19:35	Domingo Colin (MEX)	1980-04-27	Cherkasy, Soviet Union
1:19:30	Jozef Pribilinec (TCH)	1983-09-24	Bergen, Norway
1:19:24	Carlos Mercenario (MEX)	1987-05-03	New York City, United States
1:19:12	Axel Noack (GDR)	1987-06-21	Karl-Marx-Stadt, GDR
1:19:08	Mikhail Shchennikov (URS)	1988-07-30	Kiev, Soviet Union
1:18:20	Andrey Perlov (URS)	1990-05-26	Moscow, Soviet Union
1:18:13	Pavol Blažek (TCH)	1990-09-16	Hildesheim, West Germany
1:18:04	Bu Lingtang (CHN)	1994-04-07	Beijing, PR China
1:17:46	Julio Martinez (GUA)	1999-05-08	Eisenhüttenstadt, Germany
1:17:22	Paquillo Fernández (ESP)	2002-04-28	Turku, Finland
1:17:21	Jefferson Pérez (ECU)	2003-08-23	Paris, France
1:17:16	Vladimir Kanaykin (RUS)	2007-09-29	Saransk, Russia
1:17:02	Yohann Diniz (FRA)	2015-03-08	Arles, France
1:16:36	Yusuke Suzuki (JPN)	2015-03-15	Nomi, Japan
1:16:10	Toshikazu Yamanishi (JPN)	2025-02-16	Kobe, Japan

== See also ==
- Women's 20 kilometres walk world record progression
