= Pablo Colín =

Mexican racewalker

Personal information
- Born: 29 June 1937 (age 89) Pachuca, Mexico
- Height: 1.74 m (5 ft 9 in)
- Weight: 62 kg (137 lb)

Sport
- Sport: Athletics
- Event: Racewalking

Pablo Colín Martínez (born 29 June 1937) is a retired Mexican racewalker. He competed in the men's 50 kilometres walk at the 1968 Summer Olympics.

His brothers Domingo Colín and Marcelino Colín were also racewalkers.

== Personal bests ==
- 50 kilometres walk – 4:21:43 (1970)
