= Tadamasa Ejiri =

Japanese racewalker

Personal information
- Nationality: Japanese
- Born: 11 May 1934 (age 91)

Sport
- Sport: Athletics
- Event: Racewalking

Tadamasa Ejiri (江尻 忠正, Ejiri Tadamasa; born 11 May 1934) is a Japanese racewalker. He competed in the men's 50 kilometres walk at the 1964 Summer Olympics.
