= Åke Söderlund =

Swedish racewalker

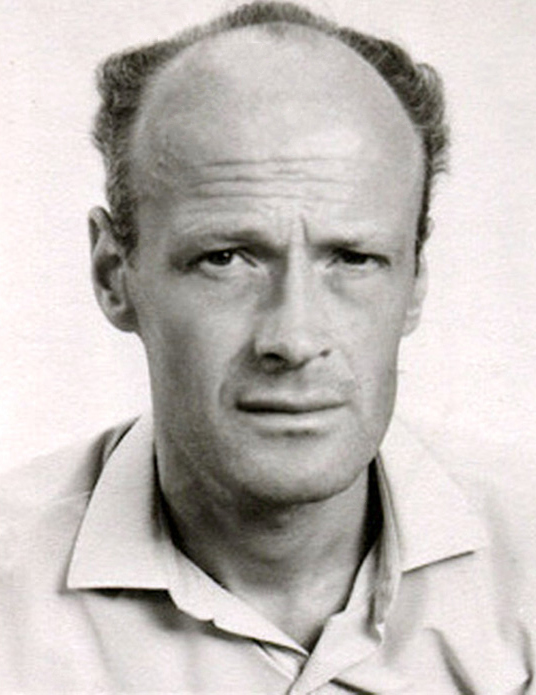

Personal information
- Born: 11 April 1925 Stockholm, Sweden
- Died: 25 August 2002 (aged 77) Tyresö, Sweden
- Height: 185 cm (6 ft 1 in)
- Weight: 73 kg (161 lb)

Sport
- Sport: Athletics
- Event: Race walking
- Club: Stockholms GK

Achievements and titles
- Personal bests: 20 kmW – 1:33:19 (1957); 50 kmW – 4:18:52 (1956)
Medal record
Representing Sweden
IAAF World Race Walking Cup
| Bronze medal – third place | 1961 Lugano | 50 km walk |

Åke Wilhelm Söderlund (11 April 1925 – 25 August 2002) was a Swedish racewalking athlete. He competed at the 1952, 1960 and 1964 Summer Olympics with the best result of 18th place in the 20 km event in 1964.

Söderlund twice competed at the European Athletics Championships, but failed to finish the 50 kilometres race walk. He also took part in the IAAF World Race Walking Cup twice, winning a bronze medal in the 50 km event in 1961 and placing 12th in the 20 km in 1967. Söderlund won three Nordic Race Walking Championships, in the 20 km in 1957 and 1967 and in the 50 km in 1961.

Söderlund later competed in the masters category and won the 25 km event at the 1975 World Association of Veteran Athletes Championships. His twin brother Erik was also an elite racewalker.

== International competitions ==
| Year | Competition | Venue | Position | Event | Notes |
|---|---|---|---|---|---|
| 1952 | Olympic Games | Helsinki, Finland | 28th | 50 km walk | 5:30:56.6 |
| 1954 | European Championships | Bern, Switzerland | — | 50 km walk | DNF |
| 1958 | European Championships | Stockholm, Sweden | — | 50 km walk | DNF |
| 1960 | Olympic Games | Helsinki, Finland | — | 50 km walk | DNF |
| 1961 | IAAF World Race Walking Cup | Lugano, Switzerland | 3rd | 50 km walk | 4:36:48 |
| 1964 | Olympic Games | Tokyo, Japan | 18th | 20 km walk | 1:36:53 |
| 1967 | IAAF World Race Walking Cup | Bad Saarow, East Germany | 12th | 20 km walk | 1:36:02 |

== National titles ==
- 50 km walk: 1961
