= Mike Brodie (athlete) =

American racewalker

Personal information
- Full name: Michael Warren Brodie
- Nationality: American
- Born: June 17, 1941 (age 85)

Sport
- Sport: Athletics
- Event: Racewalking

Michael Warren Brodie (born June 17, 1941) is an American racewalker. He competed in the men's 50 kilometres walk at the 1964 Summer Olympics.
