= Heinz Mayr =

German racewalker

Personal information
- Nationality: German
- Born: 20 October 1935 Braunschweig, Germany
- Height: 1.82 m (5 ft 11 1/2 in)
- Weight: 78 kg (172 lb)

Sport
- Sport: Athletics
- Event: Racewalking
- Club: Eintracht Braunschweig; TSV Salzgitter; VfL Wolfsburg

Achievements and titles
- Personal best: 20 km – 1:29:25 (1972)

Heinz Mayr (born 20 October 1935) is a former German racewalker, who competed for West Germany in the 1972 Summer Olympics.

He competed for the clubs Eintracht Braunschweig, TSV Salzgitter and VfL Wolfsburg. He won the national championship in the 50 kilometres race walk in 1961, as well as four German racewalking team championships with Eintracht Braunschweig (also in 1961), Salzgitter (in 1969) and Wolfsburg (in 1973 and 1974).

Mayr competed in the 20 kilometres race walk at the 1972 Summer Olympics in Munich, where he finished 13th.

== Competition record ==
Year	Competition	Venue	Position	Event	Notes
Representing West Germany
1970	World Race Walking Cup	Eschborn, West Germany	19th	20 km	1:34:55
1972	Summer Olympics	Munich, West Germany	13th	20 km	1:33:13.8
1973	World Race Walking Cup	Lugano, Switzerland	—	20 km	DQ
1975	World Race Walking Cup	Le Grand-Quevilly, France	24th	20 km	1:33:40
