= John Kelly (race walker) =

Irish racewalker

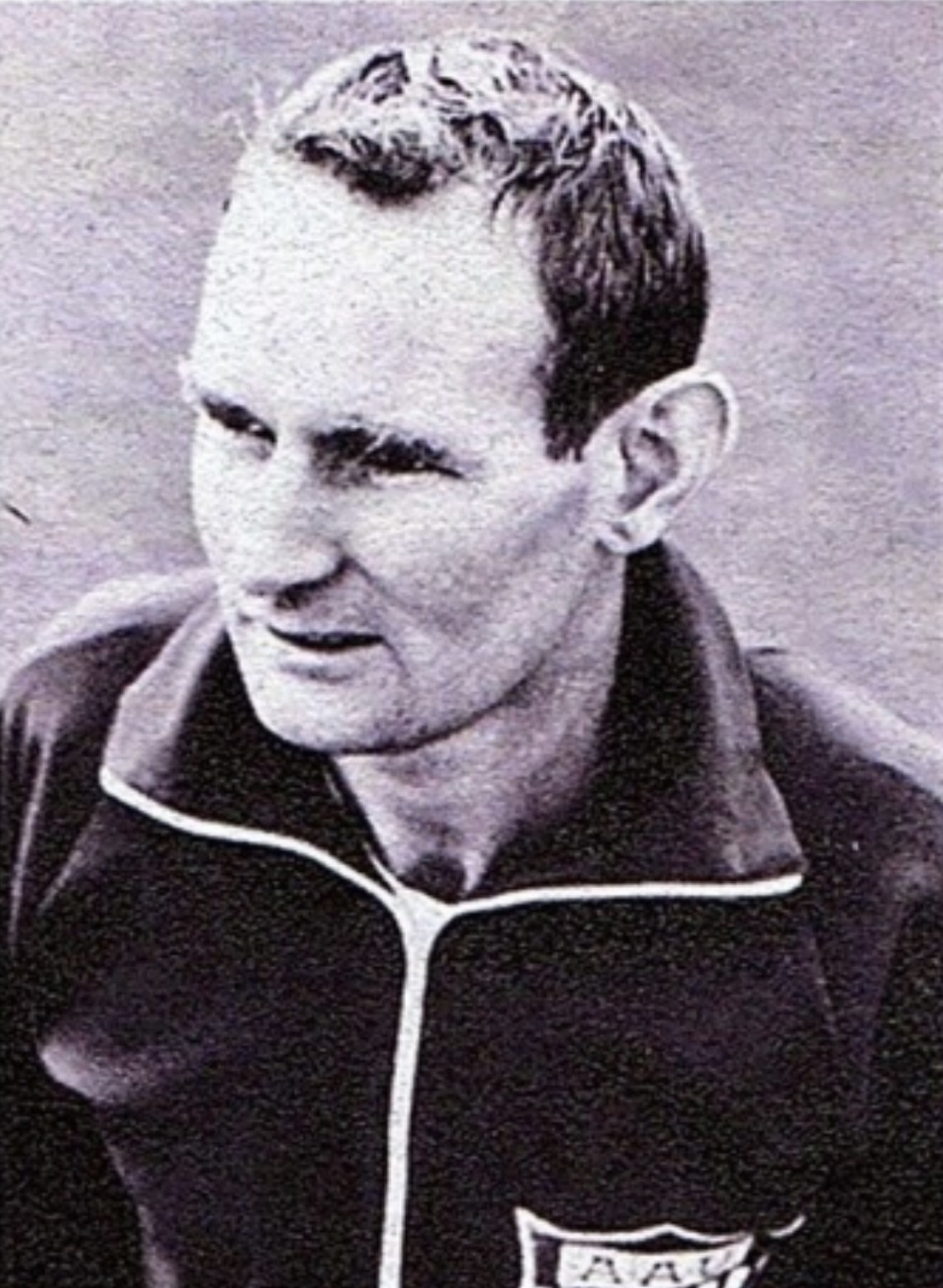

Personal information
- Nationality: Irish
- Born: 6 December 1929 Loughmore, County Tipperary, Ireland
- Died: 13 November 2012 (aged 82) Prescott, Arizona
- Height: 189 cm (6 ft 2 in)

Sport
- Sport: Athletics
- Event(s): Racewalking, Marathon
- Club: Amateur Athletic Union, Southern California Striders, Santa Monica Track Club

John Kelly (6 December 1929 – 13 November 2012) was an Irish racewalker, marathon runner, and actor. He competed in the men's 50 kilometres walk at the 1968 Summer Olympics.

John Kelly was born in Loughmore, a village in County Tipperary, Ireland.

Kelly won the 1965 Philadelphia Marathon, finishing the race in a time of 2:37:23 during a snowstorm.

Throughout the 1960s and 1970s he was a member of various track and field athletics clubs, including the Amateur Athletic Union, Southern California Striders and the Santa Monica Track Club.

In the 1970s Kelly became a member of the Screen Actors Guild and appears briefly in the musical film Star!, starring Julie Andrews and Richard Crenna. In September 1973, he was a guest on The Tonight Show Starring Johnny Carson.
