= Boris Khrolovich =

Belarusian racewalker

Personal information
- Full name: Boris Antonovich Khrolovich
- Nationality: Belarusian
- Born: 16 April 1936 (age 90) Novaya Bayarshchyna, Mogilev Region, Belarusian SSR, Soviet Union

Sport
- Sport: Athletics
- Event: Racewalking

Boris Antonovich Khrolovich (born 16 April 1936) is a Belarusian racewalker. He competed in the men's 20 kilometres walk at the 1964 Summer Olympics, representing the Soviet Union.
