= Oleksandr Shcherbyna =

Soviet racewalker

Medal record

Men's athletics

Representing the Soviet Union

IAAF World Race Walking Cup
Bronze medal – third place	1967 Bad Saarow	50 km walk

European Athletics Championships
Bronze medal – third place	1966 Budapest	50 km walk

Oleksandr Shcherbyna (Ukrainian: Олександр Щербина; born 25 January 1931) is a former Soviet racewalker. Born in Kirovohrad in the Ukrainian SSR, he represented his country in the 50 kilometres race walk at the 1960 Summer Olympics, placing fourth. He won two bronze medals in major international competition, coming third at the 1966 European Athletics Championships and 1967 IAAF World Race Walking Cup.

His personal bests were 1:26:46 hours for the 20 kilometres race walk and 3:57:28 hours for the 50 km walk.

== International competitions ==
Year	Competition	Venue	Position	Event	Notes
1960	Olympic Games	Rome, Italy	4th	50 km walk	4:31:44
1966	European Championships	Budapest, Hungary	3rd	50 km walk	4:20:47.2
1967	IAAF World Race Walking Cup	Bad Saarow, East Germany	3rd	50 km walk	4:13:07

== See also ==
- List of European Athletics Championships medalists (men)
