= Kiue Kuribayashi =

Japanese racewalker

Personal information
- Nationality: Japanese
- Born: 15 May 1934 (age 91)

Sport
- Sport: Athletics
- Event: Racewalking

Kiue Kuribayashi (栗林 喜右衛, Kuribayashi Kiue; born 15 May 1934) is a Japanese racewalker. He competed in the men's 20 kilometres walk at the 1964 Summer Olympics.
