= Yasuo Naito =

Japanese racewalker

Personal information
- Nationality: Japanese
- Born: 28 November 1942 (age 83)

Sport
- Sport: Athletics
- Event: Racewalking

Yasuo Naito (内藤 靖雄, Naitō Yasuo; born 28 November 1942) is a Japanese racewalker. He competed in the men's 20 kilometres walk at the 1964 Summer Olympics.
