= Chris McCarthy (race walker) =

American race walker

Personal information
- Full name: Christopher McCarthy
- Born: June 21, 1931 Worcester, Massachusetts, U.S.
- Died: April 22, 2009 (aged 77) Chicago, Illinois, U.S.

Sport
- Country: United States
- Sport: Men's athletics

Christopher McCarthy (June 21, 1931 – April 22, 2009) was an American race walker. He competed for Team USA at the 1964 Summer Olympics in the Men's 50 kilometres walk, finishing 21st with a personal best time 4:35:42.

== Achievements ==
Year	Tournament	Venue	Result	Event
1964	Olympic Games	Tokyo, Japan	21st	50 km

== Life ==
He was the longest sequentially enrolled graduate student at the University of Chicago, and studied under Leo Strauss (political science).
