= Noboru Ishiguro (athlete) =

Japanese racewalker (1932–2021)

Personal information
- Nationality: Japanese
- Born: 2 August 1932 Japan
- Died: 11 February 2021 (aged 88) Japan

Sport
- Sport: Athletics
- Event: Racewalking

Noboru Ishiguro (石黒昇, Ishiguro Noboru; 2 August 1932 – 11 February 2021) was a Japanese racewalker. He competed in the men's 20 kilometres walk at the 1964 Summer Olympics.

Ishiguro died on 11 February 2021 of esophageal cancer. He had been scheduled to serve as the Olympic torch carrier for Saitama Prefecture during the 2020 Summer Olympics.
