= Chedli El-Marghni =

Tunisian racewalker

Personal information
- Nationality: Tunisian
- Born: 19 April 1939 (age 87)

Sport
- Sport: Athletics
- Event: Racewalking

Chedli El-Marghni (born 19 April 1939) is a Tunisian racewalker. He competed in the men's 20 kilometres walk at the 1964 Summer Olympics.
