= Anatoliy Solomin =

Soviet race walker (born 1952)

Personal information
- Born: 2 July 1952
- Height: 1.79 m (5 ft 10 1/2 in)
- Weight: 70 kg (154 lb)

Sport
- Sport: Athletics
- Event: Race walking

Achievements and titles
- Personal bests: 20 km: 1:19:43 (1983); 10,000 m: 39:19.32 (1981)
Medal record
Men's athletics
Representing Soviet Union
European Championships
Bronze medal – third place	1978 Prague	20 km walk
European Indoor Championships
Gold medal – first place	1983 Budapest	5000 m walk
IAAF World Race Walking Cup
Bronze medal – third place	1983 Bergen	20 km walk

Anatoliy Vasilyevich Solomin (Russian: Анатолий Васильевич Соломин; born 2 July 1952) is a former Soviet Ukrainian race walker. Solomin competed in men's 20 km walk at the 1980 Summer Olympics and contended for the gold medal, but was disqualified from the lead shortly before the finish. He was European indoor champion in men's 5000 m walk in 1983 and briefly held the 20 km world best. He was born in Komarovka in Penza Oblast.

== Career ==
Track & Field News ranked Solomin in the world's top 10 at 20 km seven times between 1977 and 1984. In July 1978 he walked 20 km in 1:23:30 in Vilnius, breaking the unofficial world record of Mexico's Daniel Bautista by ten seconds. The following month Solomin placed third at the European Championships in Prague, behind Roland Wieser and Pyotr Pochynchuk; Wieser's winning time of 1:23:12 broke Solomin's fresh record by 18 seconds.

At the 1980 Summer Olympics Solomin broke away from the main group with Bautista, who was the defending champion and had been ranked #1 in the world every year since 1975; for much of the way, the two seemed headed for gold and silver. In one of the most dramatic moments of the 1980 Games, both Bautista and Solomin were disqualified near the finish for improper walking, and the gold went to Italy's Maurizio Damilano, who had been in third place.

Solomin won gold in men's 5000 m walk at the 1983 European Indoor Championships, defeating his teammate Yevgeniy Yevsyukov by almost 22 seconds. He did not compete in the 1983 World Championships, but later that year he placed third at the IAAF Race Walking Cup in Bergen, losing only to the top two from the World Championships, Jozef Pribilinec and Ernesto Canto. Solomin's time of 1:19:43 was his personal best, only 13 seconds off the world best Pribilinec set in winning the race, and remained the Ukrainian record until Ivan Losev broke it at the 2014 Ukrainian championships.

Solomin was Soviet champion in the 20 km walk in 1977 and 1981 and placed second behind Nikolay Vinnichenko at the 1979 Soviet Spartakiad. He remains active in race walking as a coach.

Records
Preceded by Daniel Bautista	World record holder in men's 20 km walk 19 July 1978 – 30 August 1978	Succeeded by Roland Wieser
