= Ihor Della-Rossa =

Ukrainian racewalker

Personal information
- Born: 25 April 1939 (age 87) Tbilisi, Georgian Soviet Socialist Republic
- Died: 13 March 2015 (aged 75)

Sport
- Sport: Athletics
- Event: Racewalking

Ihor Della-Rossa (25 April 1939 – 13 March 2015) was a Georgian-born Soviet racewalker. He competed in the men's 50 kilometres walk at the 1968 Summer Olympics, representing the Soviet Union.
