= John Edgington =

British racewalker

Personal information
- Full name: John William Edgington
- Nationality: British
- Born: 5 April 1936
- Died: February 1993

Sport
- Sport: Athletics
- Event: Racewalking

John William Edgington (5 April 1936 – February 1993) was a British racewalker. He competed in the men's 20 kilometres walk at the 1964 Summer Olympics.
