= Stefano Serchinic =

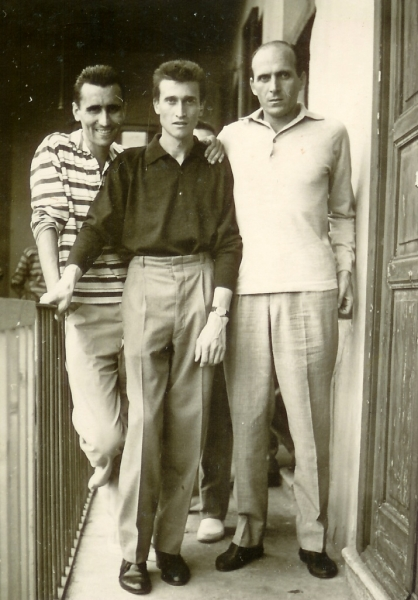
- Stefano Serchinic (first from left) with Armando Zambaldo and Pino Dordoni at a collegial rally in Asiago in 1958

Personal information
- Nationality: Italian
- Born: 28 October 1929 Skradin, Kingdom of Yugoslavia
- Died: 30 June 2010 (aged 80) Turin, Italy
- Height: 1.78 m (5 ft 10 in)
- Weight: 68 kg (150 lb)

Sport
- Country: Italy
- Sport: Athletics
- Event: Race walk
Medal record
World Race Walking Cup
Bronze medal – third place	1961 Lugano	Combined Team

Stefano Serchinic (28 October 1929 – 30 June 2010) was a Yugoslav-born Italian male racewalker who competed at the 1960 Summer Olympics. Serchinic died in Turin on 30 June 2010, at the age of 80.

== See also ==
- Italian team at the running events
- Italy at the IAAF World Race Walking Cup
