= Jack Mortland =

American racewalker (1935–2026)

Personal information
- Full name: John Eggart Mortland
- Nationality: American
- Born: January 23, 1935 Galion, Ohio, U.S.
- Died: August 5, 2026 (aged 91)
- Height: 5 ft 10.5 in (179 cm)
- Weight: 134 lb (61 kg)

Sport
- Sport: Athletics
- Event: Racewalking

John Eggart Mortland (January 23, 1935 – August 5, 2026) was an American racewalker. He competed in the men's 20 kilometres walk at the 1964 Summer Olympics.

Mortland started a small newsletter the Ohio Race Walker in 1965 together with Jack Blackburn. He eventually took over and published it himself until 2016. Mortland died on August 5, 2026, at the age of 91.

== Personal bests ==
- 20 kilometres walk – 1-36:35 (1964)
