= Jean Bouillon =

Belgian marine biologist

- Born: 20 December 1926; Uccle, Belgium
- Died: 29 March 2009 (aged 82)
- Scientific career
- Fields: Marine biology
- Institutions: Université libre de Bruxelles

Jean Bouillon (20 December 1926 – 29 March 2009) was a Belgian marine biologist and expert on Hydrozoa.

== Biography ==
Jean Bouillon was born in Uccle, Belgium. He worked from 1955 to 1991 as a professor at the Université libre de Bruxelles. He was both Director of the Laboratory of Zoology and Marine Biology at the University.

From 1975 to 1994, he was the founder and director of the King Leopold III Biological Station at Laing Island, Hansa Bay, Madang Province, Papua New-Guinea.

On 4 April 1992, he became a corresponding member of l’Académie royale des Sciences, des Lettres et des Beaux-Arts de Belgique . He was promoted to full member on 13 January 2001 and an honorary member 7 October 2004.

He was also a member of l’Académie royale des sciences d’Outre-mer.

His last publication, the modestly named "An Introduction to Hydrozoa", is the standard work on this group of animals.

== Bibliography ==
- Bouillon, J., 1954. A hydropolyp in the biological cycle of a freshwater jellyfish. Nature, Lond. 174 4441: 1112.
- Bouillon, J., 1955. Le cycle biologique de Limnocnida tanganyicae Gunther, 1893. C. r. hebd. Séanc. Acad. Sci., Paris 240 3: 353–355.
- Bouillon, J. & P. Semal-Van Gansen, 1956. Sur quelques hydres africaines. Revue Zool. Bot. afr. 54 1–2: 202–208.
- Bouillon, J. & G. Vandermeerssche, 1957. Structure et nature de la mésoglée des Hydro- et Scyphoméduses. Annls Soc. r. zool. Belg. 87 1: 9–25.
- Bouillon, J., 1956. Le bougeonnement manubrial de la méduse Limnocnida tanganyicae. Bull. Séanc. Acad. r. Sci. colon. 1 6: 1152–1180.
- Bouillon, J., 1957. Étude monographique du genre Limnocnida (Limnoméduse). Annls Soc. r. Zool. Belg. 87 2: 254–500.
- Bouillon, J., 1957. Limnocnida congoensis, nouvelle espèce de limnoméduse du bassin du Congo. Revue Zool. Bot. afr. 56 3–4: 388–395.
- Bouillon, J., P. Castiaux & G. Vandermeerssche, 1957. Quelques aspects histologiques de Limnocnida tanganyicae. Observations de coupes ultrafines au microscope électronique. Exp. Cell Res. 13 3: 529–544.
- Bouillon, J., 1958. A propos de méduses Congolaises. Zooleo 47 : 273–275.
- Bouillon, J., 1958. In: P. Brien, M. Poll & J. Bouillon, eds, Une mission zoologique CEMUBAC au Stanley Pool (1957). I. Limnocnida congoensis, nouvelle espèce de Limnoméduse du bassin du Congo, pp. 5–8. Mém. Acad. r. Sci. colon., n. ser. 7 6: 1–39.
- Bouillon, J., P. Castiaux & G. Vandermeerssche, 1958. Musculature de la méduse Limnocnida tanganyicae (Hydroméduse). Bull. Microsc. appl. -28 4: 81–87.
- Bouillon, J., P. Castiaux & G. Vandermeerssche, 1958. Structure submicroscopique des cnidocils. Bull. Microsc. appl. 8 3: 61–63.
- Bouillon, J., P. Castiaux & G. Vandermeerssche, 1958. Ultrastructure des éléments basophiles de certaines cellules de Coelentérés. Bull. Microsc. appl. 8 2: 33–37.
- Bouillon, J., 1959. Limnocnida congoensis, nouvelle espèce de limnoméduse du bassin du Congo. In: Résultats scientifiques des missions zoologiques au Stanley Pool subsidiées par le Cemubac (Université Libre de Bruxelles) et le Musée royal du Congo (1957–1958), IV. Annls Mus. r. Congo Belge 8 Zool. 71: 175–185.
- Bouillon, J., 1959. Nature et structure de la mésoglée des hydropolypes. Bull. biol. Fr. Belg. 93 1: 64–72.
- Bouillon, J., 1962. Sur le bougeonnement médusaire manubrial de Rathkea octopunctata. Annls Soc. r. Zool. Belg. 92 1: 7–25.
- Bouillon, J., 1963. Les cellules glandulaires des hydroïdes. C. r. hebd. Séanc. Acad. Sci., Paris 256 7: 1617–1620.
- Bouillon, J., 1963. Sur quelques particularités de la réproduction sexuée de Cordylophora caspia (Pallas, 1771). Annls Soc. r. Zool. Belg. 93 1: 155–158.
- Bouillon, J. & B. Werner, 1965. Production of medusae buds by the polyps of Rathkea octopunctata (M. Sars) (Hydroida Athecata). Helgoländer wiss. Meeresunters. 12 1–2: 137–148.
- Bouillon, J. 1965. Diagnose préliminaire de trois hydroïdes de Roscoff. In: G. Teissier, ed., Inventaire de la faune marine de Roscoff (Cnidaires-Cténaires). Travaux de la Station Biologique de Roscoff 16: 54.
- Bouillon, J., 1966. Les cellules glandulaires des hydroïdes et des hydroméduses. Leur structure et la nature de leurs sécrétions. Cah. Biol. mar. 7 2: 157–205.
- Bouillon, J. & C. Levi, 1967. Ultrastructure du cnidocil, de l'appareil cnidociliaire, de l'appareil péri-nématocystique et du cnidopode des nématocytes d'hydroïdes. Ann. Sci. nat., Zool. Biol. anim. -129 3: 425–456.
- Bouillon, J. & G. Deroux, 1967. Remarques sur les Cnidaires du type de Microhydrula pontica Valkanov, 1965, trouvés à Roscoff. Cah. Biol. mar. 8 3: 253–272.
- Bouillon, J. & S. Bosschaert, 1967. Mise en évidence d'un blocage de la digestion chez les Cordylophora caspia (Hydroïdes Athécates) irradiées aux rayons X. C. r. hebd. Séanc. Acad. Sci., Paris −264 1: 97–100.
- Bouillon, J., 1967. Révision de la famille des Ptilocodiidae avec la description d'un nouveau genre et d'une nouvelle espèce. Bull. Acad. r. Belg. 53 9: 1106–1131.
- Bouillon, J. & S. Bosschaert, 1968. Effet de la cystéaminine sur Cordylophora caspia (Hydroïde athécate) irradiées aux rayons X. Bull. Acad. r. Belg., Cl. Sci. -554 2: 183–189.
- Bouillon, J. & S. de Moreau-Bosschaert, 1968. Effet de la cystéamine sur Cordylophora caspia (Cnidaire athécate). C. r. hebd. Séanc. Acad. Sci., Paris −266 : 1966–1968.
- Bouillon, J., 1968. Introduction to Coelenterates. In: M. Florkin & B.T. Scheer, eds., Chemical Zoology, 2, Porifera, Coelenterata, and Platyhelminthes Chem. Zool. : 81–147.
- Bouillon, J., 1968. Sur la structure des tentacules adhésifs des Cladonematidae et Eleutheriidae (Anthomedusae). Pubbl. Staz. zool. Napoli 36 : 471–504.
- Bouillon, J., 1968. Une mission scientifique belge a l'archipel des Seychelles. Africa-Tervuren 14 : 98–102.
- Bouillon, J., 1969. Les bâtisseurs de récifs. Forum Univ. libre Bruxelles 5 : 471–504.
- Bouillon, J., F. Bazin & J.J. Cleret, 1969. Une Limnoméduse: Ostroumovia inkermanica dans le canal de Caen (Calvados, France). Bull. Soc. linn. Normandie, 10 10 100: 75–79.
- Bouillon, J. & G. Houvenaghel, 1970. Histophysiologie de la digestion chez Cladonema radiatum, Dujardin 1843 (Anthomeduse). Pubbl. Staz. zool. Napoli 38 1: 71–108.
- Bouillon, J., 1970. Hydrozoa. In: P. Gray, ed. The Encyclopedia of the biological Sciences 2 : 437–443.
- Bouillon, J., 1970. Les cnidaires. In: P.P. Grassé, ed. La vie des animaux. 2. La progression de la vie. : 200–219.
- Bouillon, J. & C. Levi, 1971. Structure et ultrastructure des attaches hydranthes-hydrothèques chez les polypes Thecata Z. Zellforsch. mikrosk. Anat. 121 2: 218–231.
- Bouillon, J., 1971. Sur quelques Hydroïdes de Roscoff. Cah. Biol. mar. 12 3: 323–364.
- Bouillon, J. & M. Nielsen, 1974. Étude de quelques organes sensoriels de cnidaires. Archs Biol., Paris 85 3: 307–328.
- Bouillon, J., 1974. Description de Teissiera milleporoides, nouveau genre et nouvelle espèce de Zancleidae des Seychelles (Hydrozoaires; Athécates. – Anthoméduses), avec une révision des hydroïdes Pteronematoidea. Cah. Biol. mar. 15 : 113–154.
- Bouillon, J., 1974. Sur la structure de Paracoryne huvei, Picard, 1957. (Coelenterata, Hydrozoa, Athecata). Mém. Acad. r. Belg., Cl. Sci., 4o −218 3: 5–45.
- Bouillon, J., 1974. Ultrastructure des cnidophores de Teissiera milleporoides Bouillon (Athecates, Anthoméduses, Zancleidae). Cah. Biol. mar. 15 : 285–293.
- Bouillon, J. & C. Massin, 1975. La cnidogénèse. Annls Soc. r. zool. Belg. 104 : 7–38.
- Bouillon, J., 1975. Sur la reproduction et l'écologie de Paracoryne huvei Picard (Tubularoidea – Athecata – Hydrozoa – Cnidaria). Archs Biol. 86 : 45–96.
- Bouillon, J. & G. Coppois, 1977. Étude comparative de la mésoglée des Cnidaires. Cah. Biol. mar. 18 3: 339–368.
- Bouillon, J. 1978. Hydroméduses de l'archipel des Seychelles et du Moçambique. Revue de Zoologie Africaine 92: 117–172.
- Bouillon, J. 1978. Hydromeduses de la mer de Bismarck (Papouasie, Nouvelle-Guinée). Partie 1: Anthomedusae Capitata (Hydrozoa – Cnidaria). Cahiers de Biologie Marine 19: 249–297.
- Bouillon, J., 1978. Hydroméduses de la mer de Bismarck (Papouasie, NouvelleGuinée. Partie II. Limnomedusa, Narcomedusa, Trachymedusa et Laingiomedusa (sous-classe nov.). Cah. Biol. mar. 19 : 473–483.
- Bouillon, J., 1978. Sur un nouveau genre et une nouvelle espèce de Ptilocodidae, Hydrichthelloides reticulata et la super-famille des Hydractinoidea (Hydroida-Athecata). Station Biolgique Leopold III, Laing Island. Contribution no. 1. Steenstrupia 5 6: 53–67.
- Bouillon, J. 1980. Hydromeduses de la Mer de Bismarck. (Papouasie Nouvelle-Guinée). Partie 3: Anthomedusae – Filifera (Hydrozoa – Cnidaria). Cahiers de Biologie Marine 21: 307–344.
- Bouillon, J. 1981. A new species of the genus Eutiara, Eutiara russelli n. sp. (Anthomedusae, Hydrozoa, Cnidaria). Steenstrupia 7: 233–236.
- Bouillon, J., 1981. Origine et phylogénèse des Cnidaires et des Hydropolypes-Hydroméduses. Annls Soc. r. zool. Belg. 111 1–4: 45–56.
- Bouillon M. & Hubart J.M. (1982). Premiers resultats d'une experience de transplantation de cavernicoles pyreneens dans une grotte de Belgique. Bulletin de la Société Royale Belge d' Etudes Géologiques et Archéologiques "Les Chercheurs de la Wallonie", 25, 97–106.
- Bouillon, J., 1983. Sur le cycle biologique de Eirene hexanemalis (Goette, 1886) (Eirenidae, Leptomédusae, Hydrozoa, Cnidaria). Cah. Biol. mar. 24 4: 421–427.
- Bouillon, J. 1984. Sphaerocoryne peterseni: Nouvelle espèce d'anthoméduse de Papouaise Nouvelle-Guinée (Hydrozoa-Cnidaria). Indo-Malayan Zoology 1: 245–248.
- Bouillon, J., 1984. Sur la méduse de Porpita porpita (Linné, 1758) (Velellidae, Hydrozoa, Cnidaria). Indo-Malayan Zool. 1 2: 249–254.
- Bouillon, J., 1984. Révision de la famille des Phialuciidae (Kramp, 1955) (Leptomedusae, Hydrozoa, Cnidaria), avec un essai de classification des Thecatae-Leptomedusae Indo-Malayan Zool. 1 1: 1–24.
- Bouillon, J., 1984. Hydroméduses de la Mer de Bismarck (Papouasie – Nouvelle – Guinée). Partie IV: Leptomedusae (Hydrozoa – Cnidaria). Indo-Malayan Zool. 1 1: 25–112.
- Bouillon, J. 1985a. Essai de classification des hydropolypes-hydroméduses (Hydrozoa-Cnidaria). Indo-Malayan Zoology 2: 29–243.
- Bouillon, J. 1985b. Notes additionelles sur les hydroméduses de la mer de Bismarck (Hydrozoa-Cnidaria). Indo-Malayan Zoology 2: 245–266.
- Bouillon, J., 1986. Nemalecium gen. nov., genre nouveau de Haleciidae (Thecata-Leptomedusae, Hydrozoa, Cnidaria). Indo-Malayan Zool. 3 1: 71–80.
- Bouillon, J., F. Boero & N. Gravier-Bonnet, 1986. Pseudostenotele, a new type of nematocyst, and its phylogenetic meaning within the Haleciidae (Cnidaria, Hydrozoa). Indo-Malayan Zool. 3 1: 63–69.
- Bouillon, J., M. Claereboudt & G. Seghers, 1986. Hydroméduses de la baie de Hansa (Mer de Bismarck; Papouasie Nouvelle-Guinée). Répartition, conditions climatiques et hydrologiques. Indo-Malayan Zool. 3 2: 105–152.
- Bouillon, J. & F. Boero, 1987. The life cycle of Teissiera medusifera (Teissieridae, Anthomedusae, Hydrozoa, Cnidaria). Indo-Malayan Zool. 4 1: 1–9.
- Bouillon, J., 1987. Considérations sur le développement des Narcoméduses et sur leur position phylogénétique. Indo-Malayan Zool. 4 2: 189–278.
- Bouillon, J., F. Boero & G. Seghers, 1987. Redescription of Cladocoryne haddoni Kirkpatrick and a proposed phylogeny of the superfamily Zancleoidea (Anthomedusae, Hydrozoa, Cnidaria). Indo-Malayan Zool. 4 2: 279–292.
- Bouillon, J., F. Boero, F. Cicogna & P.F.S. Cornelius, 1987. A new approach to scientific meetings. Editor's preface to: J. Bouillon, F. Boero, F. Cicogna & P.F.S. Cornelius, eds, Modern trends in the Systematics, Ecology and Evolution of Hydroids and Hydromedusae : xi–xiii .
- Bouillon, J., F. Boero, F. Cicogna & P.F.S. Cornelius, 1987. The cnidarian work of Donat Naumov, Frederick Russell, and Bernhard Werner. In: J. Bouillon, F. Boero, F. Cicogna & P.F.S. Cornelius, eds., Modern trends in the Systematics, Ecology and Evolution of Hydroids and Hydromedusae : 3.
- Bouillon, J., F. Boero, F. Cicogna & P.F.S. Cornelius, eds., 1987. Modern trends in the Systematics, Ecology and Evolution of Hydroids and Hydromedusae. Clarendon Press, Oxford : i–xxi, 1–328.
- Bouillon, J. & P.F.S. Cornelius, 1988. Redescription and affinity of the large hydroid Chitina ericopsis Carter, 1873 (Cnidaria, Hydrozoa, Solanderidae). J. nat. Hist. 22 6: 1551–1563.
- Bouillon, J., & Gravier-Bonnet, N. 1988. Pseudosolanderia picardi, nouveau genre et nouvelle espèce de Rosalindidae de la Réunion (Anthomedusae, Hydrozoa, Cnidaria). Bulletin du Muséum National d'Histoire Naturelle Section A Zoologie Biologie et Ecologie Animales 9: 755–771.
- Bouillon, J., F. Boero & G. Seghers, 1988. Notes additionelles sur les Hydroméduses de la mer de Bismarck (Hydrozoa-Cnidaria) II. Indo-Malayan Zool. 5 1: 87–99.
- Bouillon, J., G. Seghers & F. Boero, 1988. Note sur les cnidocystes des hydroméduses de la mer de Bismarck (Papouasie-Nouvelle Guinée). Indo-Mal. Zool. 5 2: 203–244.
- Bouillon, J., G. Seghers & F. Boero, 1988. Notes additionelles sur les méduses de Papouasie Nouvelle-Guinée (Hydrozoa, Cnidaria) III. Indo-Malayan Zool. 5 : 225–253.
- Bouillon, D.R. & J.B. Dempson, 1989. Metazoan parasite infection in landlocked and anadromous Arctic charr (Salvelinus alpinus Linnaeus), and their use as indicators of movement to sea in young anadromous charr. Canadian Journal of Zoology 67(10):2478–2485. (French summary.)
- Bouillon, J. & P.A. Grohmann, 1990. Pinushydra chiquitita gen. et sp. nov. (Cnidaria, Hydrozoa, Athecata), a solitary marine mesopsammic polyp. Cah. Biol. mar. 31 2: 291–305.
- Bouillon, J., F. Boero & G. Seghers, 1991. Notes additionelles sur les méduses de Papouasie Nouvelle-Guinée (Hydrozoa, Cnidaria) IV. Additional notes on the medusae of Papua New Guinea (Hydrozoa, Cnidaria): IV. Cah. Biol. mar. 32 3: 387–411.
- Bouillon, J., F. Boero & S. Fraschetti, 1991. The life cycle of Laodicea indica (Laodiceidae, Leptomedusae, Cnidaria). In: R.B. Williams, P.F.S. Cornelius, R.G. Hughes & E.A. Robson, eds., 1991. Coelenterate Biology: Recent research on Cnidaria and Ctenophora. Proceedings of the Fifth International Conference on Coelenterate Biology, 1989. Hydrobiologia 216217 : 151–157.
- Bouillon, J., F. Boero, F. Cicogna, J.M. Gili & R.G. Hughes, 1992. Non-Siphonophoran Hydrozoa: what are we talking about ? In: J. Bouillon, F. Boero, F. Cicogna, J.M. Gili & R.G. Hughes, eds., Aspects of hydrozoan biology. Scientia Marina 56 2–3: 279–284.
- Bouillon, J., F. Boero, F. Cicogna, J.M. Gili & R.G. Hughes, eds, 1992. Aspects of hydrozoan biology. Scientia Marina 56 2–3: 99–284.
- Bouillon, J., K. Wouters & F. Boero, 1992. Etude des Solanderiidae de la Baie de Hansa (Papouasie Nouvelle-guinée) avec une révision du genre Solanderia (Cnidaria, Hydrozoa). Bull. Inst. r. Sci. nat. Belg., Biol. 62 : 5–33.
- Bouillon, J. & P.A. Grohmann, 1994. A new interstitial stolonal hydroid: Nannocoryne gen. nov. mammylia sp. nov. (Hydromedusae, Anthomedusae, Corynidae). Cah. Biol. Mar. 35 4: 431–439.
- Bouillon, J., 1994. Embranchement des Cnidaires (Cnidaria). In: P.P. Grassé & D. Doumenc, eds, Traité de Zoologie 3 2: 1–28.
- Bouillon, J., 1995. Classe des Hydrozoaires (Hydrozoa Owen, 1843) In: P.P. Grassé, D. Doumenc (eds.) Traité de Zoologie 3 2: 29–416.
- Bouillon, J., C. Massin & R. Kresevic, 1995. Hydroidomedusae de l'Institut royal des Sciences naturelles de Belgique 78 : 1–106.
- Bouillon, J., D. Medel & A. Peña Cantero, 1997. The taxonomic status of the genus Stylactaria Stechow, 1921 (Hydroidomedusae, Anthomedusae, Hydractiniidae), with the description of a new species. Sci. Mar. 61 4: 471–486.
- Bouillon, J., 1995. Hydromedusae of the New Zealand Oceanographic Institute (Hydrozoa, Cnidaria). N.Z. Jl. Zool. 22 2: 223–238.
- Bouillon, J., 1999. Hydromedusae. In: D. Boltovskoy, ed., South Atlantic Zooplankton 1 : 385–465.
- Bouillon, J., Barnett T.J., 1999. The Marine Fauna of New Zealand: Hydromedusae (Cnidaria: Hydrozoa). Niwa Biodiversity. Memoir, New Zealand 113: 1–136.
- Bouillon J., Gili J.M., Pages F. & Isla E. (2000). Amphinema modernisme, a new Pandeid (Cnidaria: Anthomedusae) from the Southern Ocean. Polar Biology, 23, 34–37.
- Bouillon, J. & F. Boero, 2000. Phylogeny and classification of Hydroidomedusae. The Hydrozoa: a new classification in the light of old knowledge. Thalassia Salentina 24 : 1–46.
- Bouillon, J. & F. Boero, 2000. Phylogeny and classification of Hydroidomedusae. Synopsis of the families and genera of the Hydromedusae of the world, with a list of the worldwide species. Thalassia Salentina 24 : 47-296.
- Bouillon, J., Pagès F., Gili J.-M., Palanques A., Puig P., Heussner S., 2000. Deep-water Hydromedusae from the Lacaze-Duthiers submarine canyon (Banyuls, Northwestern Mediterranean) and description of two new genera, Guillea and Parateclaia. In: C.E. Mills, F. Boero, A. Migotto & J.M. Gili, eds., Trends in Hydrozoan Biology – IV. Sci. Mar. 64 Supl. 1: 87–95.
- Bouillon, J.; Boero, F. (2000). Synopsis of the families and genera of the Hydromedusae of the world, with a list of the worldwide species. Thalassia Salent. 24: 47–296
- Bouillon, J., Pages F., Gili J.M., 2001. New species of benthopelagic hydroidomedusae from the Weddell Sea. Polar Biol. 24 11: 839–845.
- Bouillon, J.; Medel, M.D.; Pagès, F.; Gili, J.-M.; Boero, F.; Gravili, C. (2004). Fauna of the Mediterranean Hydrozoa. Scientia Marina (Barcelona), 68(Suppl. 2). Consejo Superior de Investigaciones Científicas. Institut de Ciènces del Mar: Barcelona, Spain. 5-449 pp.
- Bouillon, J.; Gravili, C.; Pagès, F.; Gili, J.-M.; Boero, F. (2006). An introduction to Hydrozoa. Mémoires du Muséum national d'Histoire naturelle, 194. Muséum national d'Histoire naturelle: Paris, France. ISBN 2-85653-580-1. 591pp. + 1 cd-rom
