= Roy Syversson =

Swedish racewalker

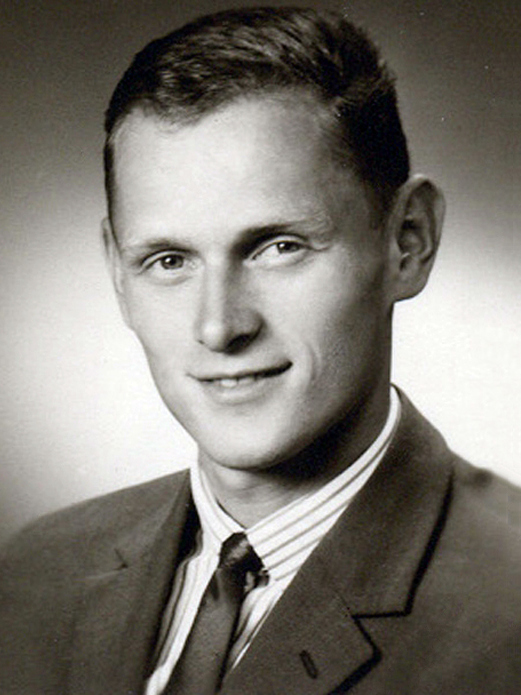

Personal information
- Born: 9 April 1940 Köla, Sweden
- Died: 10 July 2024 (aged 84)
- Height: 171 cm (5 ft 7 in)
- Weight: 63 kg (139 lb)

Sport
- Sport: Athletics
- Event: Race walking
- Club: Köla AIK

Achievements and titles
- Personal best: 50 kmW – 4:23:27 (1964)

Roy Malcolm Syversson (9 April 1940 – 10 July 2024) was a Swedish race walker. He placed 8th in the 50 km event at the 1963 World Cup and 24th at the 1964 Summer Olympics.
