= Jan Rolstad =

Norwegian racewalker

Jan Rolstad (born 17 August 1950) is a retired Norwegian race walker.

He finished 21st in the 20 km race at the 1971 European Championships and eleventh at the 1972 Summer Olympics.
