= Ilie Popa (race walker) =

Romanian racewalker

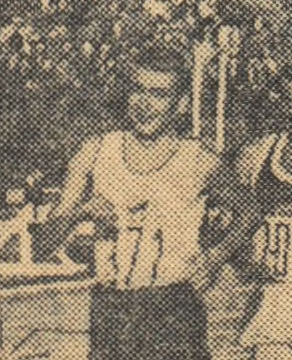
- Ilie Popa in 1963

Personal information
- Nationality: Romanian
- Born: 9 May 1940
- Died: March 2016

Sport
- Sport: Athletics
- Event: Racewalking

Ilie Popa (9 May 1940 – March 2016) was a Romanian racewalker. He competed in the men's 50 kilometres walk at the 1964 Summer Olympics.
