= Ismael Hernández (athlete) =

Mexican racewalker

Personal information
- Nationality: Mexican
- Born: 17 June 1946 (age 80)

Sport
- Sport: Athletics
- Event: Racewalking

Ismael Hernández (born 17 June 1946) is a Mexican racewalker. He competed in the men's 50 kilometres walk at the 1968 Summer Olympics.
