= Naceur Ben Messaoud =

Tunisian racewalker

Personal information
- Nationality: Tunisian
- Born: 1 August 1938 (age 87)

Sport
- Sport: Athletics
- Event: Racewalking

Naceur Ben Messaoud (born 1 August 1938) is a Tunisian racewalker. He competed in the men's 50 kilometres walk at the 1964 Summer Olympics.
