= Burkhard Leuschke =

Personal information
- Nationality: German
- Born: 27 April 1940 (age 86)
- Occupation: Race walker

Burkhard Leuschke (born 27 April 1940) is a retired East German race walker.

He finished fourth at the 1964 Olympic Games, won the silver medal at the 1965 IAAF World Race Walking Cup and the bronze medal at the 1970 IAAF World Race Walking Cup.

Leuschke represented the sports club SC Dynamo Berlin and became East German champion over 35 km in 1963.
