= Roine Karlsson =

Swedish race walker

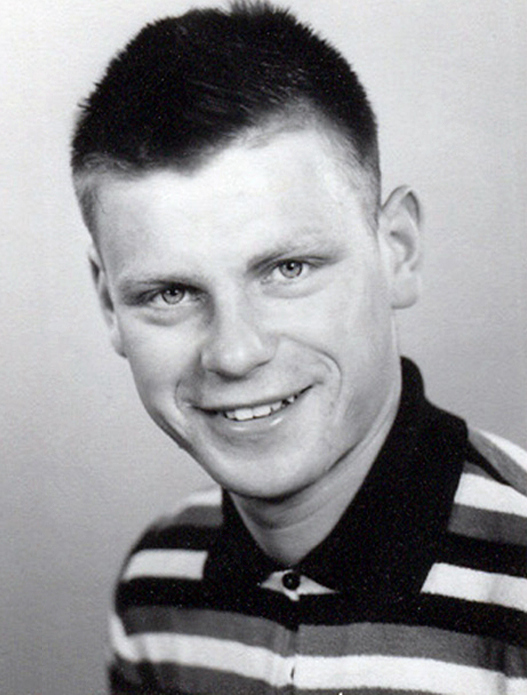
- Karlsson around 1964

Personal information
- Born: 12 November 1943 Uppsala, Sweden
- Died: 17 February 2013 (aged 69) Uppsala, Sweden
- Height: 178 cm (5 ft 10 in)
- Weight: 65 kg (143 lb)

Sport
- Sport: Athletics
- Event: Race walking
- Club: Alunda GK

Achievements and titles
- Personal best: 20 kmW – 1:34:05 (1968)

Roine Sven Torbjörn Karlsson (12 November 1943 – 17 February 2013) was a Swedish race walker. He competed in the 20 km event at the 1964 Summer Olympics where he placed 20th. Aged 20, he was the youngest Swedish track and field athlete at those games.
