= Armando Zambaldo =

Italian former racewalker (born 1943)

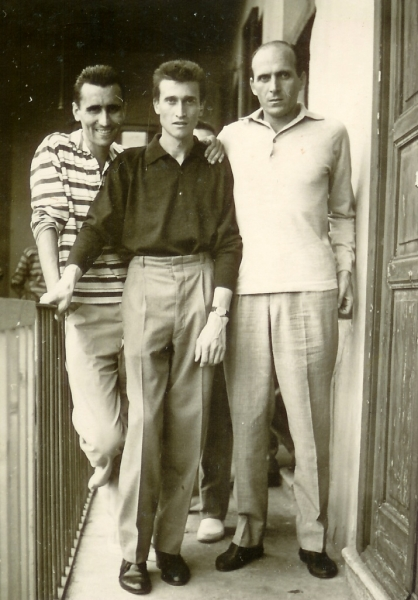
- Armando Zambaldo when he was fifteen (in center) with Stefano Serchinic and Pino Dordoni at a collegial rally in Asiago in 1958

Personal information
- Nationality: Italian
- Born: 23 October 1943 (age 82) Illasi, Province of Verona, Italy
- Height: 1.74 m (5 ft 8 1/2 in)
- Weight: 68 kg (150 lb)

Sport
- Country: Italy
- Sport: Athletics
- Event: Race walk
- Club: G.S. Fiamme Gialle

Achievements and titles
- Personal best: 20 km: 1:27.15 (1977)
Medal record
Mediterranean Games
Gold medal – first place	1975 Algers	20 km walk

Armando Zambaldo (born 23 October 1943 in Illasi) is an Italian former racewalker

== Biography ==
He competed in the 1976 Summer Olympics in 20 km walk and finished 6th.

== Achievements ==
Year	Competition	Venue	Position	Event	Performance	Note
1976	Olympic Games	Montreal	6th	20 km walk	1:28:25	

== National titles ==
Armando Zambaldo has won 4 times the individual national championship.

- 4 wins in 20 km walk (1972, 1973, 1974, 1975)
