= Reima Salonen =

Finnish race walker (born 1955)

Medal record

Men's athletics

Representing Finland

European Championships
Gold medal – first place	1982 Athens	50 km walk

Reima Untamo Salonen (born November 19, 1955, in Taivassalo, Southwest Finland) is a retired race walker from Finland, known for winning the gold medal in the men's 50 km Walk event at the 1982 European Championships in Athens, Greece. A former world record holder, he represented his native country in three Summer Olympics (1980, 1984 and 1988).

He was the bronze medalist at the 1976 World Championships in Athletics – a one-off 50 km walk competition to compensate for the dropping of the event at the 1976 Summer Olympics.

== International competitions ==
Representing Finland
Year	Competition	Venue	Position	Event	Notes
1976	World Championships	Malmö, Sweden	3rd	50 km	
1980	Olympic Games	Moscow, Soviet Union	9th	20 km	1:31:32
1980	Olympic Games	Moscow, Soviet Union	—	50 km	DNF
1982	European Championships	Athens, Greece	1st	50 km	3:55:29
1983	World Championships	Helsinki, Finland	12th	20 km	1:22:51
1984	Olympic Games	Los Angeles, United States	4th	50 km	3:58:30
1988	Olympic Games	Seoul, South Korea	42nd	20 km	1:28:25
1988	Olympic Games	Seoul, South Korea	18th	50 km	3:51:36

Records
Preceded by Daniel Bautista	Men's 20km World Record Holder; June 9, 1979 – March 30, 1980	Succeeded by Daniel Bautista
