= Sergey Grigoryev (race walker) =

Soviet racewalker

Personal information
- Nationality: Soviet
- Born: 7 October 1937 (age 88)

Sport
- Sport: Athletics
- Event: Racewalking

Sergey Grigoryev (born 7 October 1937) is a Soviet racewalker. He competed in the men's 50 kilometres walk at the 1968 Summer Olympics and the 1972 Summer Olympics.
