= Gerhard Sperling =

East German race walker

Medal record

Men's athletics

Representing East Germany

European Championships
Silver medal – second place	1971 Helsinki	20 km walk

Gerhard Sperling (born 25 November 1937 in Berlin) is an East German former race walker.

Sperling represented the sports club TSC Berlin and became East German champion over 20 km in 1966, 1968, 1969 and 1971.

He competed at the Deaflympics in 1961, 1969 and 1977, winning five medals, including three gold.

== International competitions ==
Year	Competition	Venue	Position	Event	Notes
1964	Olympic Games	Tokyo, Japan	9th	20 km	
1965	World Race Walking Cup	Pescara, Italy	3rd	20 km	
1966	European Championships	Budapest, Hungary	4th	20 km	
1968	Olympic Games	Mexico City, Mexico	5th	20 km	
1969	European Championships	Athens, Greece	4th	20 km	
1971	European Championships	Helsinki, Finland	2nd	20 km	
1972	Olympic Games	Munich, West Germany	4th	20 km	

== See also ==
- Deaf people in the Olympics
