= Hannes Koch =

German racewalker

Personal information
- Nationality: German
- Born: 12 February 1935
- Died: 26 December 1994 (aged 59)

Sport
- Sport: Athletics
- Event: Racewalking

Hannes Koch (12 February 1935 – 26 December 1994) was a German racewalker. He competed in the men's 20 kilometres walk at the 1960 Summer Olympics.
