= Tommy Kristensen =

Danish racewalker (born 1939)

Personal information
- Nationality: Danish
- Born: 6 November 1939 (age 86)

Sport
- Sport: Athletics
- Event: Racewalking

Tommy Kristensen (born 6 November 1939) is a Danish racewalker. He competed in the 20 kilometres walk at the 1960 Summer Olympics and the 1964 Summer Olympics.
