= Alexander Bílek =

Czech racewalker

Personal information
- Nationality: Czechoslovak
- Born: 20 January 1941 Dresden, Nazi Germany
- Died: 20 April 2017 (aged 76) Prague, Czech Republic

Sport
- Country: Czechoslovakia
- Sport: Athletics
- Event: Racewalking

Alexander Bílek (20 January 1941 – 20 April 2017) was a Czech racewalker. He competed for Czechoslovakia in the men's 20 kilometres walk at the 1964 Summer Olympics.
