= Nikolay Smaga =

Medal record

Men's athletics

Representing the Soviet Union

Olympic Games
Bronze medal – third place	1968 Mexico City	20 km walk

European Championships
Gold medal – first place	1971 Helsinki	20 km walk
Bronze medal – third place	1966 Budapest	20 km walk
Bronze medal – third place	1969 Athens	20 km walk

Nikolay Yakovlevich Smaga (Russian: Николай Яковлевич Смага, Ukrainian: Микола Якович Смага; 22 August 1938 – 29 March 1981) was a Soviet athlete from Ukraine who competed mainly in the 20 kilometer walk. He trained at VSS Trud in Penza and later at VSS Avanhard in Kiev.

He competed for the USSR in the 1968 Summer Olympics held in Mexico City, Mexico in the 20 kilometer walk where he won the bronze medal. He was awarded the Order of the Badge of Honor (1968). He was born in Bobrove, Sumy Oblast and died in Kiev.
