= John Webb (athlete) =

British racewalker (1936–2022)

Personal information
- Nationality: British (English)
- Born: 21 December 1936 Dagenham, London, England
- Died: 9 November 2022 (aged 85)
- Height: 182 cm (6 ft 0 in)
- Weight: 63 kg (139 lb)

Sport
- Sport: Athletics
- Event: Racewalking
- Club: Basildon AC

John Albert Webb (21 December 1936 – 9 November 2022) was a British racewalker who competed at the 1968 Summer Olympics.

== Biography ==
Webb finished third behind Ron Wallwork in the 2 miles walk event at the 1966 AAA Championships and finished second behind Malcolm Tolley at the 1967 AAA Championships.

At the 1968 Olympic Games in Mexico City, he represented Great Britain in the men's 20 kilometres walk.

Webb died on 9 November 2022, at the age of 85.
