= Daniel Bautista =

Mexican athlete (born 1952)

Medal record

Men's athletics

Representing Mexico

Olympic Games
Gold medal – first place	1976 Montreal	20 km walk

Pan American Games
Gold medal – first place	1975 Mexico City	20 km walk
Gold medal – first place	1979 San Juan	20 km walk

Daniel Bautista Rocha (born August 4, 1952) is a Mexican former track and field athlete and Olympic champion. He was born in El Salado, San Luis Potosí.

In his relatively short career, Bautista dominated the walk, on the track as well as in road events. He won international attention in 1975 when he won the 20 km walk at the Pan-American Games in his native Mexico City, which made him among the favorites for the Olympic games the following year.

At the 1976 Summer Olympic games in Montreal he won the gold ahead of two East German athletes, Hans-Georg Reimann who won silver, and defending Olympic champion Peter Frenkel who took bronze. Bautista was so dehydrated after the event that he had to drink ten cans of soft drink before he could produce enough urine for the drug test that he had to take.

In the following years, Bautista set two new world record in the 20 km, as well as having the years best times at other distances. In 1977 and 1979 he won the IAAF World Race Walking Cup in the 20 km walk.

At the 1980 Summer Olympic games in Moscow he was disqualified 1800 meters from the finish. He also started the 50 km, but was forced to quit after 30 km. After that he ended his career.

== Sources ==
- Evans, Hilary; Gjerde, Arild; Heijmans, Jeroen; Mallon, Bill; et al. "Daniel Bautista". Olympics at Sports-Reference.com. Sports Reference LLC. Archived from the original on 2008-12-24.

Records
Preceded by (United Kingdom) Paul Nihill	Men's 20km Walk World Record Holder; May 30, 1976 – July 19, 1978	Succeeded by (Soviet Union) Anatoliy Solomin
Preceded by (Soviet Union) Vadim Tsvetkov	Men's 20km Walk World Record Holder; May 19, 1979 – June 9, 1979	Succeeded by (Finland) Reima Salonen
Preceded by (Finland) Reima Salonen	Men's 20km Walk World Record Holder; March 30, 1980 – April 27, 1980	Succeeded by (Mexico) Domingo Colin
