= Kazuo Saito (race walker) =

Japanese racewalker

Personal information
- Nationality: Japanese
- Born: 26 June 1942 (age 83)

Sport
- Sport: Athletics
- Event: Racewalking

Kazuo Saito (斎藤 和夫, Saitō Kazuo; born 26 June 1942) is a Japanese racewalker. He competed at the 1964 Summer Olympics and the 1968 Summer Olympics.
