= Dieter Lindner (race walker) =

East German racewalker (1937–2021)

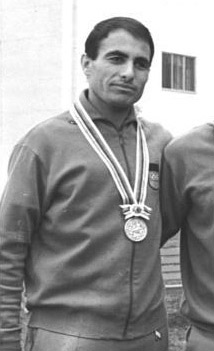
- Lindner in 1964

Personal information
- Born: 18 January 1937
- Died: 13 May 2021 (aged 84)
Medal record
Men's athletics
Representing Germany
Olympic Games
Silver medal – second place	1964 Tokyo	20 km walk
Representing East Germany
European Championships
Gold medal – first place	1966 Budapest	20 km walk
World Race Walking Cup
Gold medal – first place	1965 Pescara	20 km walk

Dieter Lindner (18 January 1937 – 13 May 2021) was an East German athlete who mainly competed in the 20 kilometre walk.

He won the silver medal for the United Team of Germany in the 20 kilometre walk at the 1964 Summer Olympics held in Tokyo and the gold medal at the 1966 European Championships in Athletics. Other achievements include a fourth place at the 1960 Summer Olympics and a sixth place at the 1962 European Championships in Athletics.
