= Horst-Rüdiger Magnor =

German racewalker

Personal information
- Nationality: German
- Born: 23 February 1942
- Died: 16 February 2008 (aged 65)

Sport
- Sport: Athletics
- Event: Racewalking

Horst-Rüdiger Magnor (23 February 1942 – 16 February 2008) was a German racewalker. He competed in the men's 50 kilometres walk at the 1968 Summer Olympics and the 1972 Summer Olympics.
