= Gennadiy Agapov =

Soviet race walker (1933–1999)

Personal information
- Born: 5 December 1933 Königsberg, Germany
- Died: 22 July 1999 (aged 65) Yekaterinburg, Sverdlovsk Oblast, Russia
- Height: 1.81 m (5 ft 11 1/2 in)
- Weight: 76 kg (168 lb)

Sport
- Country: Soviet Union
- Sport: Athletics
- Event(s): 20 km race walk, 50 km race walk
Medal record
Men's athletics
Representing Soviet Union
European Championships
| Silver medal – second place | 1966 Budapest | 50 km walk |

Gennadiy Mikhailovich Agapov (Russian: Геннадий Михайлович Агапов; 5 December 1933 – 22 July 1999) was a Soviet Russian race walker. Agapov held the unofficial world records in both the 20 km walk and the 50 km walk and placed second in the 50 km walk at the 1966 European Championships.

== Career ==
Agapov was Soviet champion in the 50 km walk in 1962, 1965 and 1966. He competed in the Olympic Games in Tokyo 1964 and Mexico City 1968, both times in the 50 km walk. He placed 12th in Tokyo and failed to finish in Mexico City. At the 1966 European Championships in Budapest he won silver in the 50 km walk, behind defending champion Abdon Pamich of Italy. Between 1965 and 1972, Agapov set unofficial world records in the 20 km walk, the 50 km walk and the 20,000 m track walk (the International Association of Athletics Federations did not ratify official records at the time); with his time of 3:55:36, he was the first man to walk 50 kilometres in less than four hours.

Records
| Preceded by (Soviet Union) Anatoly Vedyakov | World record holder in men's 20 km walk 21 July 1968 – 30 July 1972 | Succeeded by (United Kingdom) Paul Nihill |
| Preceded by (Soviet Union) Mikhail Lavrov | World record holder in men's 50 km walk 17 October 1965 – 27 May 1972 | Succeeded by (West Germany) Bernd Kannenberg |
| Preceded by (Soviet Union) Volodymyr Holubnychy | World record holder in men's 20,000 m walk 6 April 1969 – 4 July 1970 | Succeeded by (East Germany) Peter Frenkel |
