= Gennadiy Solodov =

Russian racewalker (1934–2020)

Personal information
- Born: 6 October 1934 Kurgan, RSFSR, USSR
- Died: 2 May 2020 (aged 85) Cheboksary, Russia
- Height: 178 cm (5 ft 10 in)
- Weight: 70 kg (154 lb)

Sport
- Sport: Athletics
- Event: Racewalking
- Club: Spartak

Achievements and titles
- Personal best: 20 km – 1:28:23 (1963)

Gennadiy Stepanovich Solodov (Russian: Геннадий Степанович Солодов, 6 October 1934 – 2 May 2020) was a Soviet/Russian racewalker who specialized in the 20 km distance. He competed at the 1960 and 1964 Summer Olympics and placed fifth in 1964.

In his early years Solodov competed both in racewalking and cross-country skiing, and later claimed that he always liked the latter, but not the former sport. Between 1953 and 1956 he served in the Soviet Army. He retired in 1968 after placing fifth at the national championships, and thus failing to qualify for the 1968 Summer Olympics.

Solodov lived in Sochi until 1976, when he moved to Rudny, Kazakhstan. In 1999, he moved to Cheboksary with his family to become a race walking coach.

Solodov died on 2 May 2020 at the age of 85.
