= Kurt Sakowski =

East German race walker (1930–2020)

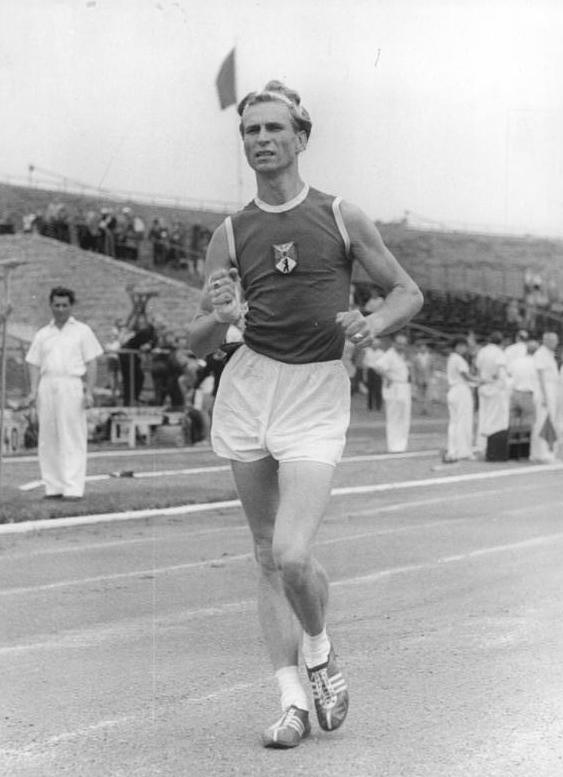
Kurt Sakowski at the 1957 German Championships in Berlin

Kurt Sakowski (23 December 1930 – 25 February 2020) was an East German race walker.

He finished eighth at the 1964 Olympic Games and finished fourth at the 1969 European Championships, both over the 50 km distance.

Sakowski represented the sports clubs SC Einheit Berlin and TSC Berlin and became East German champion over 20 km in 1957 and over 50 km in 1953.
