= Mieczysław Rutyna =

Polish racewalker (1931–2026)

- Rutyna in 1970

Personal information
- Nationality: Polish
- Born: 29 May 1931 Wielowieś, Tarnobrzeg, Poland
- Died: 23 August 2026 (aged 95) Chicago, Illinois, U.S.

Sport
- Sport: Athletics
- Event: Racewalking

Mieczysław Rutyna (29 May 1931 – 24 August 2026) was a Polish racewalker. He competed in the 20 and 50 kilometres walking events at the 1964 Summer Olympics and the 1968 Summer Olympics. Rutyna died in Chicago, Illinois on 23 August 2026, at the age of 95.
