= Volodymyr Holubnychy =

Ukrainian racewalker (1936–2021)

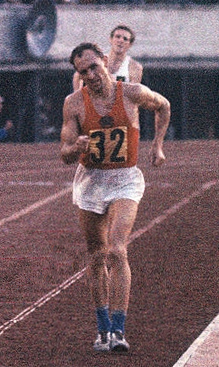
- Holubnychy at the 1964 Olympics

Personal information
- Full name: Volodymyr Stepanovych Holubnychiy
- Born: Володимир Степанович Голубничий; 2 June 1936 Sumy, Ukrainian SSR, Soviet Union
- Died: 16 August 2021 (aged 85) Sumy, Ukraine
- Height: 178 cm (5 ft 10 in)
- Weight: 77 kg (170 lb)

Sport
- Sport: Athletics
- Event: 20 km walk
- Club: Spartak Sumy
Medal record
Men's athletics
Representing the Soviet Union
Olympic Games
Gold medal – first place	1960 Rome	20 km walk
Gold medal – first place	1968 Mexico City	20 km walk
Silver medal – second place	1972 Munich	20 km walk
Bronze medal – third place	1964 Tokyo	20 km walk
European Championships
Gold medal – first place	1974 Rome	20 km walk
Silver medal – second place	1966 Budapest	20 km walk
Bronze medal – third place	1962 Belgrade	20 km walk
- Updated on 6 June 2015

Volodymyr Stepanovych Holubnychy (Ukrainian: Володимир Степанович Голубничий; also spelt Vladimir Golubnichy, 2 June 1936 – 16 August 2021) was a Ukrainian race walker, who competed for the Soviet Union. He dominated the 20 kilometre race walk in the 1960s and 1970s, winning four Olympic medals from 1960 to 1972 and finishing seventh in 1976. He became Olympic champion in 1960 and 1968. He is regarded as one of the greatest race walkers of all time and competed at the Olympics on five occasions in 1960, 1964, 1968, 1972 and 1976.

== Biography ==
He was born on 2 June 1936 and raised in Sumy, where he lived throughout his life.

== Career ==
Holubnychy initially pursued his interest in cross-country skiing and later took up race walking in 1953. He was convinced to take up the sport of race walking by former Soviet Union weightlifting champion Zosima Petrovich who was one of his lecturers at the Kyiv Physical Education Institute. He had joined the Kyiv Physical Education Institute in 1953 with the intention of becoming a ski instructor. He rose to prominence after breaking the world record in men's 20 km in 1955 at the age of 19. However, he was not selected for the 1956 Summer Olympics in Melbourne after being diagnosed with a serious liver infection. He was believed to have afflicted with liver infection due to his malnourished childhood during World War II. He recovered successfully after undergoing rehabilitation for a year and returned to race walking. He reclaimed the world title in men's 20 km race walk in 1958 with a record time of 1:27:04; this record remained unbroken for nearly a decade.

He became a member of the Soviet team in 1959. He clinched gold medal at the 1960 Summer Olympics in the men's 20 km walk event on his Olympic debut which literally took everyone by surprise given his fifth-place finish in a trial race which was held prior to the Olympic final.

He was unable to defend his Olympic title in 20 km walk event at the 1964 Summer Olympics and had to settle for the bronze medal. During the 1964 Olympics, he suffered from headaches soon after the start of the 20 km final and also reportedly fell on the road in the middle of the race walk final. At the 1968 Summer Olympics, he became Olympic champion again and also won his second Olympic gold medal. He could not retain his Olympic title at the 1972 Summer Olympics, settling for a silver medal in the 20 km walk.

Apart from his outstanding performance at the Olympics, he was the 1974 European Champion and the Soviet champion in 1960, 1964–65, 1968, 1972 and 1974. He was past his prime when he competed at the 1976 Summer Olympics, which was his fifth and final Olympic appearance. He completed the race walk with a duration of 1:29:24 and was placed at seventh position in the final. After his retirement, he competed at international masters events during the 1990s after the dissolution of the Soviet Union.

Holubnychy was awarded the Order of the Red Banner of Labour in 1960, the Order of the Badge of Honour in 1969 and the Medal "For Labour Valour" in 1972. He was inducted to the IAAF Hall of Fame on 15 September 2012.

== Death ==
He died on 16 August 2021, two months after his 85th birthday.

== See also ==
Records
Preceded by Josef Doležal; Leonid Spirin	Men's 20km Walk World Record Holder; 23 September 1955 – 25 July 1956; 15 July 1959 – 6 September 1959	Succeeded by Josef Doležal; Anatoly Vedyakov
