= Ron Wallwork =

British athlete (born 1941)

Personal information
- Nationality: British (English)
- Born: 26 May 1941 (age 85) Farnworth, Lancashire

Sport
- Sport: Athletics
- Event: race walking
- Club: Lancashire Walking Club
Medal record
Athletics
Representing England
British Empire & Commonwealth Games
Gold medal – first place	1966 Kingston	20 miles walk

Ronald Wallwork (born 26 May 1941) is a retired male race walker from England, who represented his home nation at two Commonwealth Games.

== Biography ==
Wallwork finished second and third respectively behind Paul Nihill in the 7 and 2 mile walk events at the 1965 AAA Championships. He later became a double British 2 miles champion after winning the British AAA Championships titles at the 1966 AAA Championships and 1967 AAA Championships.

Wallwork represented England and won a gold medal in the 20 miles walk, at the 1966 British Empire and Commonwealth Games in Kingston, Jamaica.

Four years later he competed in the 20 miles walk again at the 1970 British Commonwealth Games in Edinburgh, Scotland.

He is still very active in the race walking community organizing;

- the Enfield League, the largest group of races within the UK,
- the 24-hour/100-mile challenge 2009,
- the 1000 mile Captain Barclay Bicentenary Celebrity Challenge Walk with jockey Richard Dunwoody.

== International competitions ==
Year	Competition	Venue	Position	Notes
1963	IAAF World Race Walking Cup	Varese, Italy	5th	50 km
1965	IAAF World Race Walking Cup	Pescara, Italy	6th	20 km
1966	British Empire and Commonwealth Games	Kingston, Jamaica	1st	20 mi
1967	IAAF World Race Walking Cup	Bad Saarow, East Germany	9th	20 km
1970	British Commonwealth Games	Edinburgh, Scotland	5th	20 mi
1970	IAAF World Race Walking Cup	Eschborn, West Germany	10th	20 km
