= Béla Dinesz =

Hungarian racewalker

Personal information
- Nationality: Hungarian
- Born: 12 October 1930
- Died: August 1994

Sport
- Sport: Athletics
- Event: Racewalking

Béla Dinesz (12 October 1930 – August 1994) was a Hungarian racewalker. He competed in the men's 50 kilometres walk at the 1960 Summer Olympics.
