= Paul Nihill =

British racewalker (1939–2020)

Paul Nihill MBE
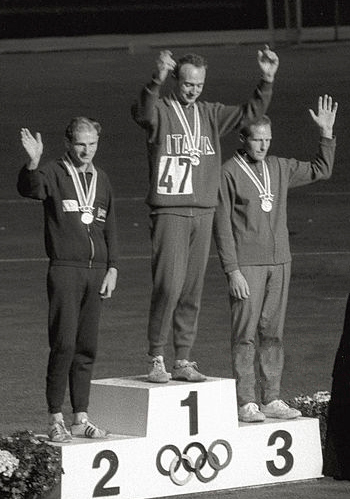
- Nihill (left) at the 1964 Olympics

Personal information
- Born: 5 September 1939 Colchester, Essex, England
- Died: 15 December 2020 (aged 81) Medway Maritime Hospital, Gillingham, Kent, England
- Height: 1.80 m (5 ft 11 in)
- Weight: 66 kg (146 lb)

Sport
- Sport: Race walking
- Club: Surrey Walking Club; Croydon and Medway

Achievements and titles
- Personal bests: 1:24:50 (20 km, 1972); 4:11:31 (50 km, 1964)
Medal record
Men's athletics
Representing Great Britain
Olympic Games
Silver medal – second place	1964 Tokyo	50 km walk
European Championships
Gold medal – first place	1969 Athens	20 km walk
Bronze medal – third place	1971 Helsinki	20 km walk

Vincent Paul Nihill MBE (5 September 1939 – 15 December 2020) was a British race walker who competed at four Olympic Games.

== Biography ==
Nihill competed in the 50 km event at the 1964, 1968 and 1972 Olympics, and won a silver medal in 1964. In 1968 he suffered from the high altitude conditions of Mexico and collapsed at the 44th kilometre, which was his only defeat in 86 races between 1967 and 1970. After that he focused on the 20 km distance, and won a European title in this event in 1969, followed by a bronze medal in 1971. In July 1972 he set a world record in the 20 km, but finished only sixth at the 1972 Olympics. He also competed in the 20 km walk in the 1976 Olympics, before retiring the following year.

Nihill was a four-time British 2 miles/3000m race walk champion and a four-time British 7 miles/10,000m race walk champion. After finishing third behind Ken Matthews at the 1963 AAA Championships he would go on to secure his eight titles in 1965 (x2), 1966, 1968, 1969, 1970, 1971 and 1975.

Nihill became the Member of the Order of the British Empire in 1976. He died at the Medway Maritime Hospital, Gillingham, Kent, on 15 December 2020, after contracting COVID-19 amid the COVID-19 pandemic in England.

Records
Preceded by Gennadi Agapov	Men's 20km Walk World Record Holder; 30 July 1972 – 30 May 1976	Succeeded by Daniel Bautista
