= István Gőri =

Hungarian racewalker

Personal information
- Nationality: Hungarian
- Born: 4 June 1938 (age 87)

Sport
- Sport: Athletics
- Event: Racewalking

István Gőri (born 4 June 1938) is a Hungarian racewalker. He competed in the men's 20 kilometres walk at the 1964 Summer Olympics.
