= Ken Matthews (race walker) =

British race walker (1934–2019)

Ken Matthews MBE
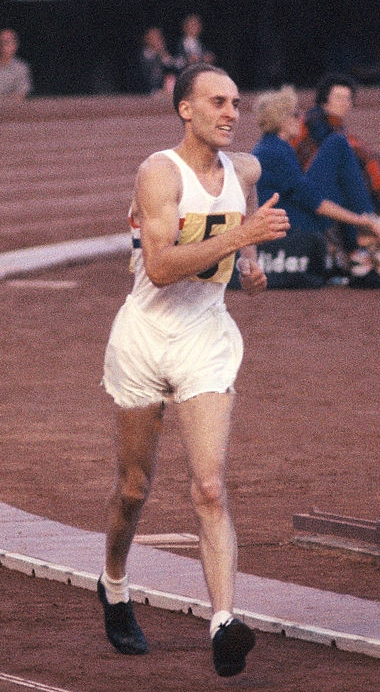
- Matthews at the 1964 Olympics

Personal information
- Born: 21 June 1934 Birmingham, England
- Died: 2 June 2019 (aged 84)
- Height: 1.85 m (6 ft 1 in)
- Weight: 78 kg (172 lb)

Sport
- Sport: Race walking
- Club: Royal Sutton Coldfield Walking Club

Achievements and titles
- Personal bests: 42:35.6 (10 km, 1960); 1.28:15 (20 km, 1960)
Medal record
Men's athletics
Representing Great Britain
Olympic Games
Gold medal – first place	1964 Tokyo	20 km walk
European Championships
Gold medal – first place	1962 Belgrade	20 km walk

Kenneth Joseph Matthews, MBE (21 June 1934 – 2 June 2019) was a British race walker, who won the Olympic (1964) and European (1962) titles in the 20 km walk.

== Biography ==
From 1957 Matthews worked as an electrician at a local power plant at Hams Hall near Sutton Coldfield and had to take a paid leave for competitions. Matthews was the British 2 miles walk champion in 1959, 1961, 1962, 1963 and 1964. Additionally he was British 7 miles walk champion in 1959, 1960, 1961, 1963 and 1964.

He took part in the 1960 Olympics, but failed to finish the 20 km race. He won the same event at the 1964 Games in a new Olympic record of 1.29:34. He was the only one of the four gold medallists from Great Britain who was not appointed a Member of the Most Excellent Order of the British Empire (MBE) soon afterwards in recognition of his achievement. Following a public outcry, he belatedly received the honours, for services to race walking, in the 1977 Silver Jubilee and Birthday Honours.

Matthews also won the European title in 1962 and twice the Lugano Trophy (1961 and 1963).

In 2007, he was the guest of honour at Hawarden High School for the Year 11 Record Of Achievement. In 2011, he was inducted into the England Athletics Hall of Fame.

He died on 2 June 2019, aged 84. An inquest concluded in early January 2020 that his death was the result of an unknown allergic reaction.
