= Stig Lindberg (race walker) =

Swedish racewalker

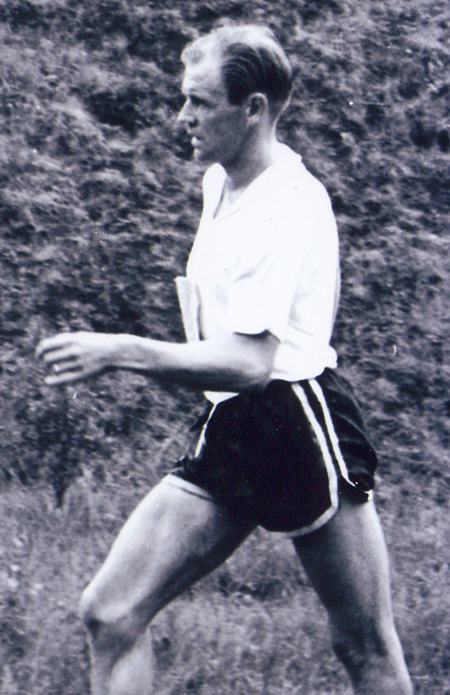

Personal information
- Born: 3 July 1931 Malungsfors, Sweden
- Died: 11 October 2010 (aged 79) Malungsfors, Sweden
- Height: 173 cm (5 ft 8 in)
- Weight: 66 kg (146 lb)

Sport
- Sport: Athletics
- Event: Race walking
- Club: Äppelbo AIK

Achievements and titles
- Personal best(s): 20 kmW – 1:35:11 (1968); 50 kmW – 4:17:58 (1966)

Stig Erik Lindberg (3 July 1931 – 11 October 2010) was a Swedish race walker. He competed in the 20 km and 50 km events at the 1968 Summer Olympics, and placed 15th and 5th, respectively.
