= Ingvar Pettersson (race walker) =

Swedish racewalker

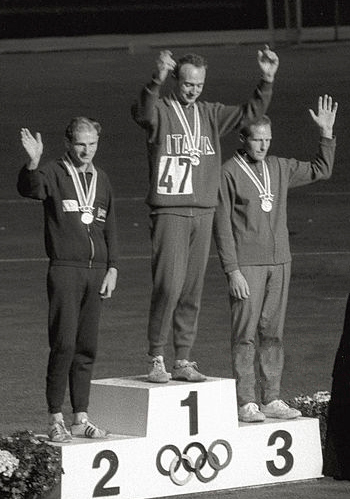
- Ingvar Pettersson (right) at the 1964 Olympics

Personal information
- Born: 19 January 1926 Rådmansö, Norrtälje, Stockholm, Sweden
- Died: 2 July 1996 (aged 70) Jädraås, Ockelbo, Gävleborg, Sweden
- Height: 1.74 m (5 ft 9 in)
- Weight: 64 kg (141 lb)

Sport
- Sport: Race walking
- Club: Stockholms GK

Achievements and titles
- Personal best(s): 4h14:17 (50 km, 1964)
Medal record
Representing Sweden
Olympic Games
Bronze medal – third place	1964 Tokyo	50 km walk

Ingvar Albin Henrik Pettersson (19 January 1926 – 2 July 1996) was a Swedish race walker who won a bronze medal in the 50 km at the 1964 Summer Olympics.
