= István Havasi =

Hungarian racewalker

István Havasi (December 21, 1930 in Dánszentmiklós, Pest – February 16, 2003 in Budapest) was a male race walker from Hungary. He competed for his native country at the 1964 Summer Olympics.

== Achievements ==
Year	Competition	Venue	Position	Event	Notes
Representing Hungary
1961	IAAF World Race Walking Cup	Lugano, Switzerland	7th	50 km	4:46:59
1963	IAAF World Race Walking Cup	Varese, Italy	1st	50 km	4:14:25
1964	Olympic Games	Tokyo, Japan	19th	50 km	4:34:14.0
1965	IAAF World Race Walking Cup	Pescara, Italy	12th	50 km	4:27:10
1967	IAAF World Race Walking Cup	Bad Saarow, East Germany	11th	50 km	4:33:01
