= Antal Kiss =

Hungarian racewalker (1935–2021)

Medal record

Representing Hungary

Men's Athletics

Olympic Games
Silver medal – second place	1968 Mexico City	50 km Walk

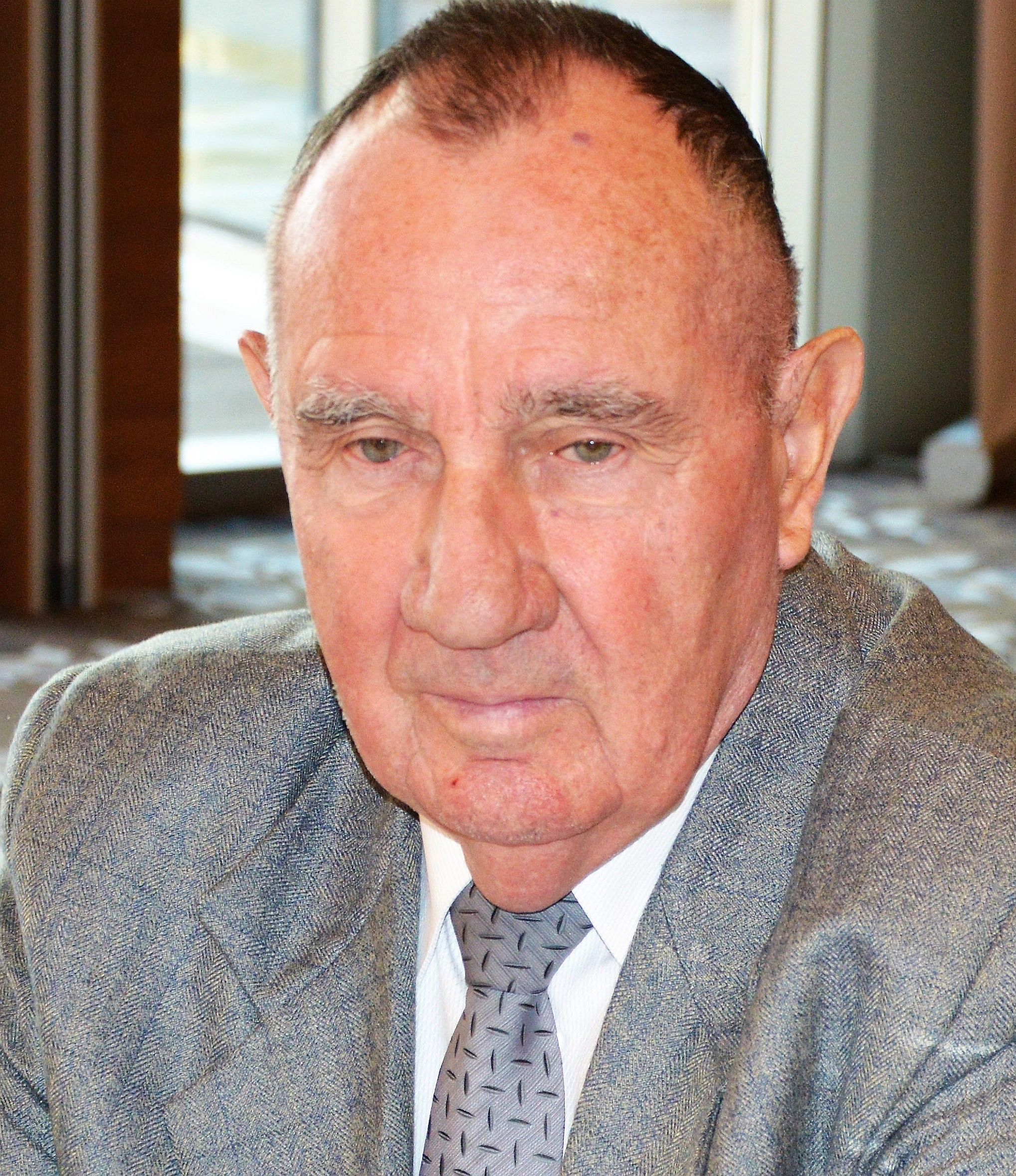
Kiss in 2013

Antal Kiss (30 December 1935 – 8 April 2021) was a Hungarian athlete, who mainly competed in the 50 kilometre walk.

He competed for Hungary in the 1968 Summer Olympics held in Mexico City, Mexico where he won the silver medal in the 50 kilometre walk.
