= London to Brighton walk =

Long-distance walking race held on public roads in England

- Date: April/May
- Location: London-Brighton, United Kingdom
- Event type: Road walk
- Distance: 51 miles 1,607 yards (83.5 km)
- Established: 1886 (140 years ago)
- Last held: 2003 (23 years ago)
- Course records: Men: 7:35:12 (1957); Don Thompson; Women: 9:04:40 (2003); Sandra Brown
- Participants: 60-100

The London to Brighton walk was a competitive walking race held on the road from London, England, to the south coast resort of Brighton. In the era before organised sport, individuals covered the distance for wager or personal challenge with the first race occurring in 1872. Open races organised by athletics clubs commenced in 1886. From 1903 races took place almost every year and from 1919 they were held annually, organised principally by Surrey Walking Club and by the Stock Exchange Athletic Club. The Surrey Open included a team prize for the first three from any one club to finish, with the most number of wins being recorded by Belgrave Harriers. The first woman to finish arrived in Brighton in 1922. That same year there was a race for blind military veterans, and this continued until 1927. In 1935 Harold Whitlock (Metropolitan Walking Club) became the first man to complete the journey in less than eight hours. The record for the event was set in 1957 by Olympic champion Donald Thompson of the Metropolitan Walking Club at 7 h 35 min 12 s. The women's record is held by Sandra Brown (Surrey Walking Club) at 9 h 4 min 40 s. There was also a walk from London to Brighton and back held sporadically from 1902 until 1967, with the record of 18 h 5 min 51 s set by Billy Baker of Queen's Park Harriers in 1926. Dwindling numbers of competitors and difficulties with obtaining sufficient numbers of volunteer marshalls and walking judges meant that the Surrey Open was last held in 1984, and the Stock Exchange walk was last held in 2003.

== History ==
In the age before mechanical transport many people walked from London to Brighton for various purposes. During the French Revolutionary Wars, large detachments of artillery marched from Woolwich to Brighton and other south coast ports, ready to respond to any French aggression.. In December 1815 a gentleman presenting himself as Count Frederick de Rode, a captain in the Emperor of Russia's Hussar Regiment, walked from London to Brighton with his servant to seek an audience with the Prince of Wales. He claimed to have "fought in all the battles throughout the two campaigns in France," and during his stay in Paris had his money and passport stolen. In August 1832 there was a cholera outbreak in London and it was decided to move as many troops as possible out of the city to protect them from the epidemic. The third battalion Royal Scots Fusiliers marched to the barracks at Brighton. Following the annual military camp at Chobham Common in August 1853, the 4th Light Dragoons marched from there to the barracks at Brighton.

The first person recorded to have covered the route for what might be considered sport was Captain Robertson of the South Gloucester Militia who walked from Brighton to London and back in September 1803. He wagered 40 guineas that he could do it within 48 hours and won his bet handsomely, arriving back at his camp in Brighton after 45 h 20 min. The following July John Bell walked from Brook Green, Hammersmith, to Brighton for a wager of 200 guineas that he could do it in fourteen hours, and won his bet with fifteen minutes to spare.

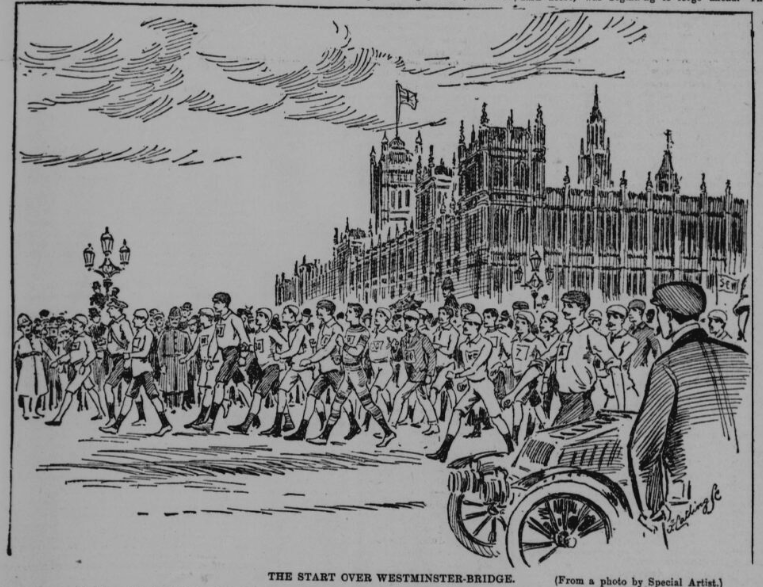
Start of the Stock Exchange walk from London to Brighton, Friday 1 May 1903.

In November 1822 a 58-year-old pedestrian called Wright covered the route on each of four consecutive days. Starting on Tuesday 5 November he walked from London to the Elephant and Castle in Brighton in 13 h 43 min, and the next day he walked back. On Thursday and Friday he repeated the walk finishing at the Crown and Barley Mow, Gray's Hill Lane, at seven o'clock in the evening having covered 216 miles (347.6 km) in a total walking time of 2 days, 7 h 11 min.

On Good Friday in 1827 Edward F. Holtaway, of King's Lynn, Norfolk, walked to the Bricklayer's Arms, North Street, Brighton in 11 h 30 min, and that remained the record for more than forty years. Benjamin Trench must have at least equalled that time in March 1868 when he walked from Kennington Church to Brighton and back in twenty-three hours, but no splits are available for his walk. Starting at six o'clock on Friday evening he returned to warm and generous applause at five o'clock on Saturday afternoon, and walked round the Oval several times to amuse his friends.

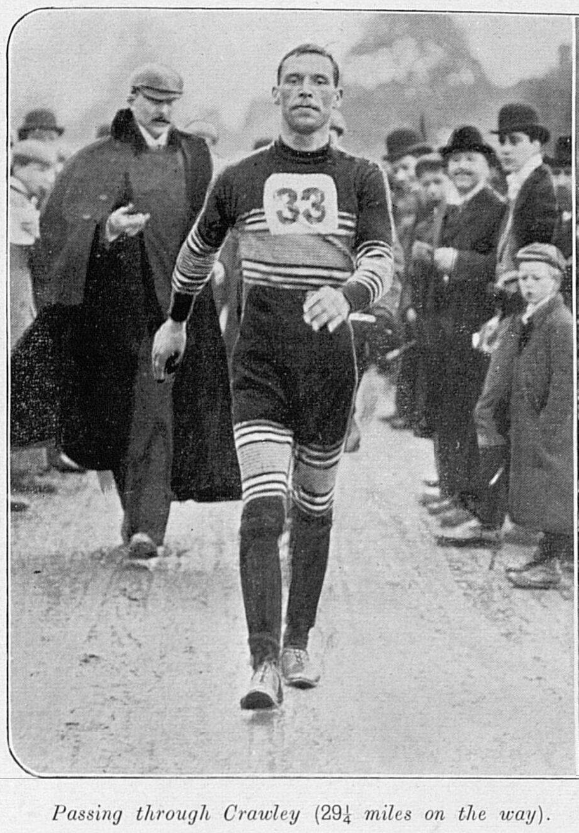
Edgar F. Broad passing through Crawley on his way to winning the Stock Exchange walk from London to Brighton on Friday 1 May 1903.

In March 1869 the brothers Henry and Walter Chinnery, of the London Athletic Club, both walked to Brighton. Walter Chinnery was the Amateur Athletic Club 1 mile and 4 miles champion in 1868, the world record holder at both of those distances. His younger brother Henry was better known for his performances over 440 yards and was also the holder of the Marquess of Queensberry middleweight boxing cup. They were also both successful stockbrokers, so that this walk is the first link in the chain that leads to the creation of the Stock Exchange walk from London to Brighton. The brothers challenged themselves to complete the walk in twelve hours. They stopped at Crawley for a bath and arrived in Brighton after being on the road for 11 h 25 min. This was the first walk to start from Westminster Bridge, but not from Big Ben, the Chinnery's started instead from the Surrey side of the river outside St Thomas' Hospital.

In March 1872 Percival Burt, of London AC, was matched to walk to Brighton against Mr Whitelaw, and although Burt won the match, and the first walking race over the course, he was not able to beat Chinnery's time. So he came back in September and had another go over the same route, from Westminster Bridge to the Old Ship Hotel, and this time he broke eleven hours, recording 10 h 52 min.

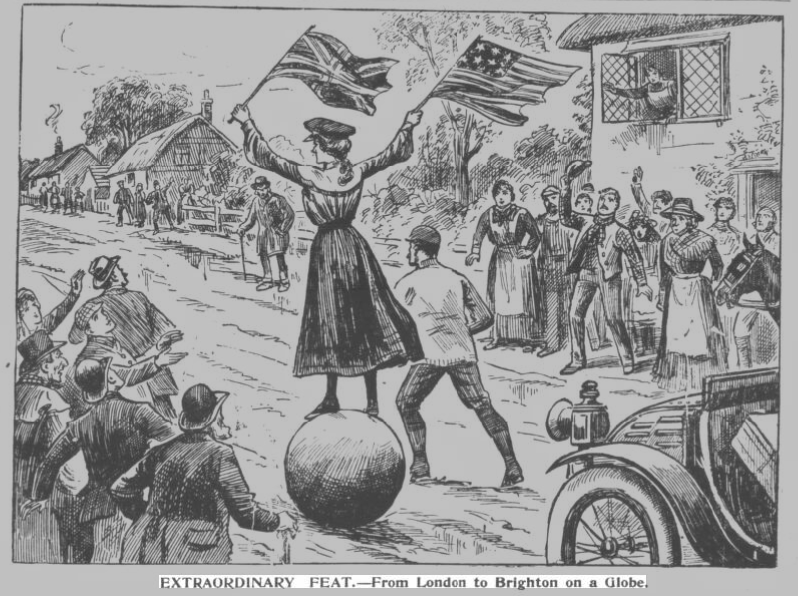
American vaudeville artist Mlle Florence completing her walk from London to Brighton on a globe in June 1903.

Between November 1883 and March 1884, Edward Payson Weston walked 50 miles a day to complete 5,000 miles in 100 days, which included a walk from Brighton to London. A couple of weeks later, on Saturday 29 March 1884, Charles O'Malley and B. Nickels, both members of London AC, were matched to walk to Brighton with Francis Firminger of South London Harriers. O'Malley had finished second in the mile at the England vs Ireland athletics match at Stamford Bridge in May 1877, was considered a "splendid steeplechaser", and was also a first-rate swimmer and boxer. Firminger was principally a long-distance runner, having won a 50 miles (80.4 km) race indoors in 1879. They started opposite the Westminster clock tower at a quarter past seven in the morning, with Firminger and O'Malley gradually pulling away from Nickels they reached Crawley, 29 miles (46.6 km) in 5 h 16 min. Shortly after this Firminger was seized with stitch and cramp and gradually fell away and failed to finish. O'Malley kept up his pace and reached the Aquarium at Brighton in 9 h 48 min. Nickels suffered from pain in his feet but saw it through to the end and recorded 10 h 8 min 20 s.

The era of open races commenced on Saturday 10 April 1886 with a race organised jointly by South London Harriers and Ealing Harriers. This had ten men racing to the coast in unfavourable weather and the event was won by J. A. McIntosh of Compton Cricket Club in 9 h 25 min 8 s.

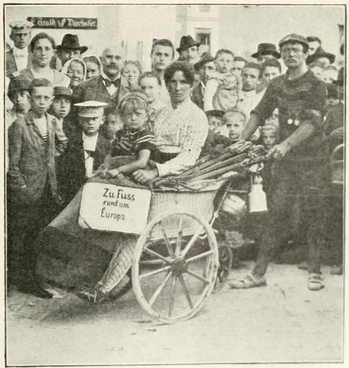
Antonín Hanslian walked round Europe from September 1900 to August 1903 pushing his wife Leopoldine and their daughter in a perambulator.

In 1891 Edward Cuthbertson of the Stock Exchange, in conversation with some friends over dinner, bet that he could beat the Chinnery's walking record from 1869, and that he could also walk, in twelve hours, the course used by James Selby in July 1888 when he set the record for driving a stage coach from London to Brighton and back. This required him to start outside the White Horse Cellars at Hatchett's Hotel in Piccadilly, and walk over Westminster Bridge, past Chinnery's start point outside St Thomas' Hospital and on to Brighton, where he would pass St Peter's Church and go on to the seafront where, instead of turning left for the Aquarium, opened in August 1872, he would turn right and continue for around a further 500 yards (450m) to the Old Ship Hotel. On Saturday 21 March he accomplished this in 10 h 6 min 18 s, winning both his wagers. Cuthbertson's time over McIntosh's course was a little more than 9 h 50 min, not a record, but a very fine performance, and it had the effect of stimulating walking at the Stock Exchange where other sports were already popular, so that by the time they came to organise an actual race there were plenty of walkers ready to take up the challenge.

In August 1895 W. Franks, a professional pedestrian, wagered £20 that he could beat McIntosh's time. The terms of the wager stipulated that he should start at four o'clock in the morning, so at that hour, accompanied by two men on bicycles, one of whom was a policeman on his day off, and witnessed by a surprisingly large crowd for such an hour, he stepped off and walked into the record books, arriving in Brighton 9 h 7 min 7 s later.

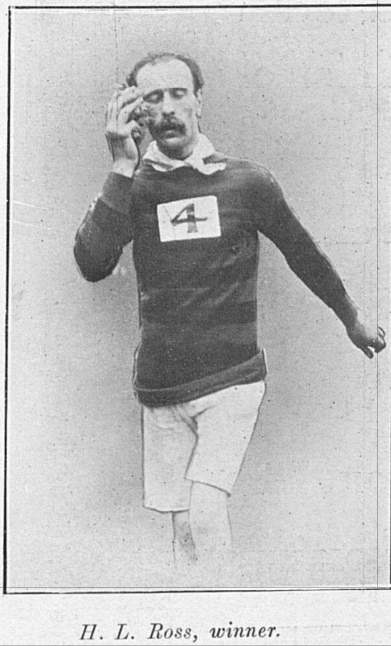
Harold Ross of Tooting Athletic Club became the first winner of the George Michael Challenge Cup when he won the Polytechnic Harriers' London to Brighton walk in September 1909.

In April 1897 Polytechnic Harriers organised an open amateur walking race with generous prizes. The winner was offered a gold medal and silver punch bowl, the next two finishers a similar but smaller silver bowl, all finishers under 10 h 15 min got a silver medal, a bronze medal was available for beating 10 h 45 min, and all finishers received a certificate. They offered overnight accommodation the night before for anyone that wanted it, cycling attendants for all competitors and refreshments available from select hotels on the route. There was to be a celebration dinner after the race where the Mayor of Brighton would present the prizes. These generous provisions attracted forty-six entries from places as far away as Northampton and Cornwall, and thirty-seven of those actually toed the line to start their walk at ten past six o'clock on the morning of Saturday 10 April, exactly eleven years to the day after McIntosh had set his record. Despite advertising in advance publicity that the walk was an attempt on the record, they chose to start not from Westminster Bridge, where McIntosh had started, but from outside the Polytechnic Institute in Regent Street. All competitors were then timed as they passed Big Ben, around thirteen minutes after they had started walking.

Starters included John Butler (Polytechnic H.) who would go on to win the Amateur Athletic Association 7 miles walk in 1901 and 1903; Edward "Teddy" Knott (Polytechnic H.), the founder of Surrey Walking Club; W. Endean and M. K. Forrester, both of Polytechnic Harriers who appeared in a total of nine Amateur Athletic Association championship finals between them. There were also two foreigners. A. T. Jensen (Copenhagen Foot Sport Club), and M. B. de Olszewski (St Petersburg Sport Club). The course was what was by now considered to be the usual cyclists route via Croydon, Redhill, Crawley, Hickstead and Dale Hill, finishing at the Aquarium, Brighton, and given on the programme as 51 miles 1,320 yards (83.2 km) from Westminster Bridge. The winner of this race was Edward Knott (Polytechnic H.) with his cycling attendant Montague Holbein, a champion cyclist and the record holder for 15 miles. Knott reached the Aquarium after 9 h 10 min 44 s of walking, but had taken only 8 h 56 min 44 s from Westminster Bridge, over twenty-eight minutes inside McIntosh's record and over ten minutes inside the professional record of W. Franks. Twelve men finished inside ten hours, and thirty-one men finished the walk, including both the foreigners.

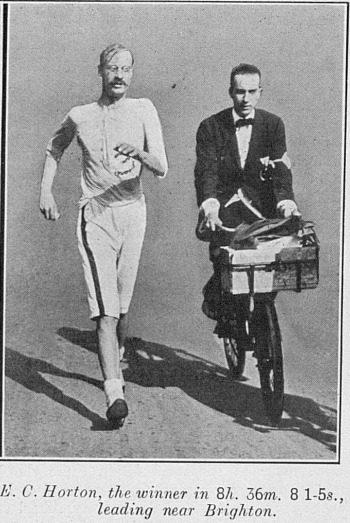
Edgar C. Horton (Surrey Walking Club) on his way to winning the London to Brighton walk in September 1913.

In 1903 a walking fever spread around the country. A twelve-mile (19.3 km) walk was organised in Arbroath with a local newspaper offering a gold watch as a prize. The Society of Physical Culture organised a walk from Leeds to Pontefract and back. A long-distance walk was organised from Manchester to Southport, another from Halifax to Bradford and back, and even the waitresses of the British Tea Table Company organised a "great" walk of their own around the streets of London. It was noted that on Whit Monday there were "a great many" walking matches taking place on the roads in the home counties, and "this form of athletic competition has become very popular." This fever was attributed by some to a misconception that walking, being natural and normal, required no training. As a result of this outburst of interest there were at least ten races from London to Brighton in 1903 alone. The first of these was held on Saturday 7 March when Ranelagh Harriers organised a walk for club members only. This took place in strong winds and torrential rain and despite these atrocious conditions all ten starters finished, the first man home being F. B. Thompson in 9 h 40 min 14 s. The following weekend the Hairdressers' Cycling and Athletic Club organised a walk in which fifty-seven men lined up in perfect weather, a warm day with a slight breeze, for John Butler of Surrey Walking Club to take the lead after 20 miles (32.1 km) and win in new record time of 8 h 43 min 16 s.

On the Monday after that race, William Bramson of the Stock Exchange suggested to some colleagues that they organise a London to Brighton walk. This proved more popular than he might have expected and they had over one hundred entries and 77 men finished the walk. The starter was Bernard Angle, a well-known boxing referee, and the race referee was Walter Chinnery, whose walk to Brighton in 1869 had started the whole thing off. Extra trains were laid on to carry spectators to Brighton, arrangements had been made to have moving pictures taken during the event and in the evening a biograph of the race was shown at the London Hippodrome and a bioscope was shown at the Alhambra Theatre. Thousands of spectators turned out to watch the start, and as far as Crawley police were required to keep crowds off the road so that the walkers could get through. At villages along the way the road was lined with spectators and a dozen police on horses were required to control the crowds in Brighton where spectators lined the road eight-deep up to an hour before the winner arrived. The winner was a 25-year-old stockbroker's clerk called Edgar F. Broad completing his first competitive walk in 9 h 30 min 1 s, and ten men finished inside ten hours. The Manchester Courier said, "we can recall no sporting contest in recent years that has aroused so much interest among all classes of the community." But not everyone was quite so enthusiastic. The Aberdeen Journal said, "the stockbrokers have had their playful little holiday, that, we fancy, is the beginning and the end of the walk to Brighton."

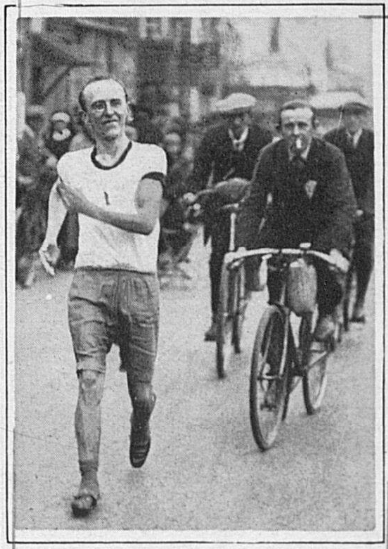
Tommy Payne (Yorkshire WC) passing the George Hotel, Crawley, on his way to winning his second consecutive London to Brighton walk in September 1920.

The Stock Exchange next held this walk in 1912, and 1914, then from 1920 it became an annual event, usually held in April or May. The winner was awarded the William Bramson Trophy, named to celebrate the man whose idea it was to have the walk in the first place. Thomas Hammond finished third in the first Stock Exchange walk and won the 1912 edition in 8 h 44 min 10 s, establishing a record that was not beaten, in this event, until 1934. When they paused for the Second World War the record stood at 8 h 36 min 14 s by Harold Hake making the last of his five wins in 1938. After the Second World War the Stock Exchange walk resumed in 1947 and continued to be very popular for many years. Richard E. Green won the event thirteen times, including eight consecutive wins from 1954 to 1961. In 1999, their seventy-sixth walk, the Stock Exchange opened up their walk to celebrate the centenary of Surrey Walking Club and that year it was won by Ian Statter of the Surrey club. Paul King was the first Stock Exchange walker to finish, winning the sixth of his nine titles. The record for the Stock Exchange walk is held by Adrian H. James who won the fourth of his five titles in 1985 with 7 h 55 min 27 s, making him one of only eleven men to walk from London to Brighton in under eight hours. (Note: The eleven men to have walked from London to Brighton in less than eight hours are: Harold H. Whitlock (Metropolitan WC) 1935; Donald J. Thompson (Metropolitan WC) 1956; Tom W. Misson (Metropolitan WC) 1958; Ray C. Hall (Stock Exchange) 1962; Abdon Pamich (Italy) 1965; Brian Eley (Trowbridge AC) 1967; Shaul Ladany (Israel) 1970; Ray Middleton (Belgrave H.) 1970; John Lees (Brighton & Hove AC) 1977; David G. Jarman (Stock Exchange) 1983; Adrian H. James (Borough of Enfield H.) 1985. Thompson (8 times), Ladany (3 times), and Misson (twice), are the only men to do it more than once.) The first lady to complete the Stock Exchange walk was Louise Clamp who finished tenth in the open race in 1993 in 11 h 28 min 10 s. The women's record is held by Sandra Brown (Surrey Walking Club) who on 17 May 2003 finished fifth in the open race in 9 h 4 min 40 s. Sandra also holds the women's record for the Surrey Open, 9 h 37 min 35 s, achieved when finishing thirteenth in 1983.

Meanwhile, in March 1903 two professional pedestrians, Dave Fenton and Tom Gowan, separately wrote open letters to the press suggesting that if some, "enterprising sportsman" were to organise a sweepstake, or other suitable contest, they would be prepared to attack the walking record from London to Brighton. The Evening News responded by announcing two races, a walk and a run, for both amateurs and professionals. But the authorities pointed out that the amateur rules prevent them from competing alongside professionals, so there were eventually four races with generous prizes. A go-as-you-please race open to professionals, a walk for invited professional pedestrians and there were so many entries for an amateur walk that they split it into two races on consecutive weekends. The professional walk was held on Saturday 4 July and won by George Toplis from Kentish Town in 8 h 55 min 23 s. The two amateur walks were held on the 11 and 18 July and although each race had more than one hundred starters the standard was not high and the winners, C. Furby and G. Holmes, only just broke ten hours.

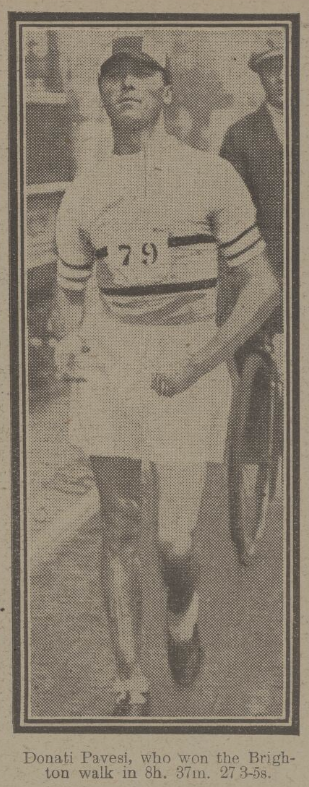
Donato Pavesi of Italy competing in the London to Brighton walk on Saturday 8 October 1921 in which he finished first.

In June 1903, an 18-year-old American vaudeville artist known professionally as Mlle. Florence walked from London to Brighton balanced on a globe. The event was the result of a wager for £500 that she could complete the walk in six days. She started from the south side of Westminster Bridge on Tuesday 16 June, and arrived in Brighton in the early hours of Sunday 21 June with crowds thronging the streets to cheer her on. She used two globes, one weighing 70 lb (31.7 kg) for walking on the level or downhill, and one weighing 20 lb (9.0 kg) for going uphill, which she did by walking backwards.

Antonín Hanslian from Austria set out from Vienna in September 1900 to walk around Europe pushing his wife Leopoldine and their young daughter in a three-wheeled perambulator to win a wager with a sports club in Vienna. Along the way he visited England in June 1903 arriving in Plymouth by ship, walked to London pushing his perambulator, and from there to Brighton, Chichester, Portsmouth and then Dover. Then he went north and visited Oxford, Manchester, Dundee, Bradford, Halifax, Hull, Oldham and left England by ship from Liverpool. He completed the leg from London to Brighton in eleven and a half hours.

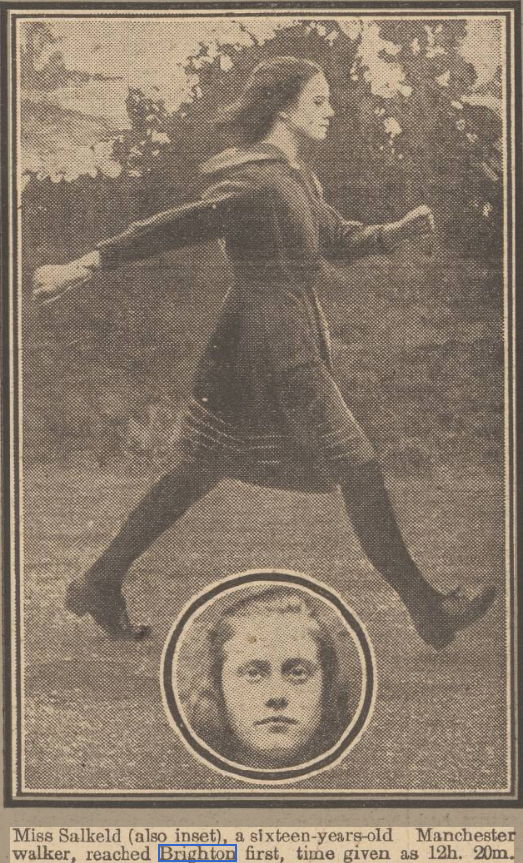
Lilian Salkeld, of Manchester, aged 16, the first female to walk from London to Brighton, taking 12 hours and 20 minutes on the night of 28–29 April 1922.

Other organisations to arrange their own walk that year were the London & South West Railways and the Newspaper Trades Association. Also in June 1903, the butchers and porters at the Metropolitan Cattle Market and Smithfield Meat Market organised a walk of their own. This started at half past five in the morning of Saturday 6 June with 61 men from 77 entrants stepping over Westminster Bridge when Val Hunter dropped the flag and set them on their way. This was won by Harry F. Otway (Herne Hill Harriers) in 9 h 21 min 1 s, nine minutes faster than the winner of the Stock Exchange walk. This is notable as the first walk by what would later become Metropolitan Walking Club, one of Britain's leading walking clubs that nurtured three Olympians, Harold Whitlock (1936 50 km Gold), Don Thompson (1960 50 km Gold), and Phil Embleton (1972 20 km).

That level of interest could not be sustained, however, and the problem of finding sufficient numbers of walking judges made it too difficult for many of these organisations to continue so that from that time Surrey Walking Club, Polytechnic Harriers and the Stock Exchange Sports Club became the main promotors of competitive walks on the Brighton road, although they did not all hold a walk every year. From 1907 Surrey Walking Club started presenting the Dithy Cup to the first man to finish in their event. The first winner was A. Hubbard, who worked in the sorting office at the post office. In 1909 Polytechnic Harriers started a series of biennial walks for the George Michael Cup, a 100 guinea trophy donated by Cyril Michael in memory of his son, George. The first winner of this trophy was Harold Ross (Tooting AC) in a new record of 8 h 11 min 14 s. In 1911 this race was held in conjunction with the Surrey Walking Club event when Tommy Payne of North Shields Polytechnic was first to finish and won the George Michael Cup, while S. C. Schofield in second place won the Dithy Cup for being the first Surrey member to finish. By the start of the First World War the record stood at 8 h 11 min 14 s to Harold Ross (Tooting AC) set in a race promoted by Polyechnic Harriers on Saturday 4 September 1909. One other event of note in this period was that in a walk organised by the Newspaper Trades Association in May 1904 F. W. Ward and F. Few, who both worked for the Evening Echo, walked the last twenty miles (32.1 km) in lock step and the race was declared a dead heat.

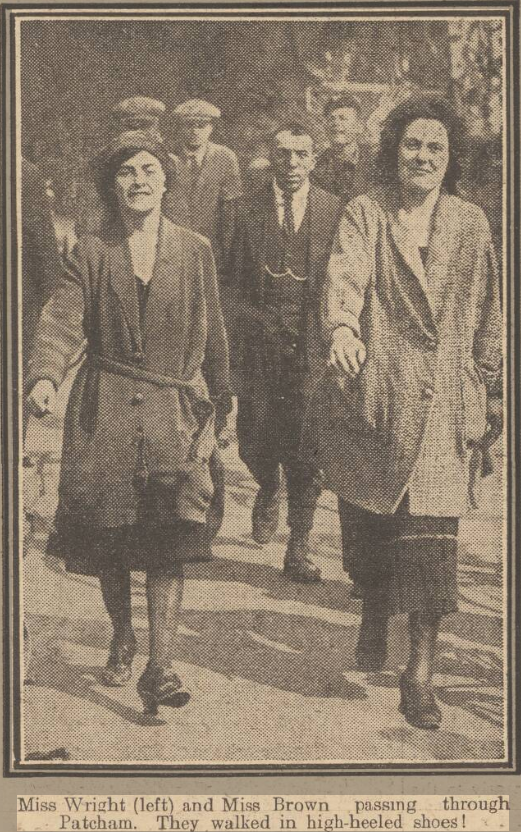
Maud Brown and Christina Wright passing through Patcham on their way from London to Brighton, 29 April 1922. They finished together in 14 hours and 35 minutes.

In April 1914 a company of the London Rifle Brigade marched from London to Brighton to beat their own record for the journey established in 1911. The sixty men and two officers each carried 50 lb (22.6 kg) of field kit, and they made four stops totalling one hour forty-five minutes, and arrived at Brighton after 14 h 23 min, establishing a new world record for long-distance marching. The record was previously held by a company of the French Foreign Legion who had covered fifty miles (80.4 km) in fifteen and a half hours.

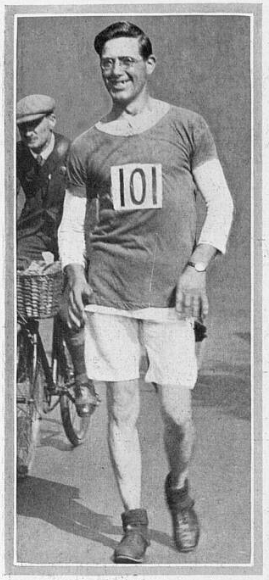
Frederick W. Poynton of Leicester Harriers, winning the London to Brighton walk in September 1923.

In 1919 Surrey Walking Club turned their club walk into an open race, presenting the Victory Cup to the individual winner and the first Surrey WC member to finish won the Dithy Cup as before. The first winner of the Victory Cup was Tommy Payne (Yorkshire WC), while the Dithy Cup that year went to Edgar Horton. Surrey WC also became first winners of the team prize, scoring the first three to finish from each club, with Yorkshire WC second. This then became an annual event, and in 1921 it was won for the first time by a foreigner. On an unseasonably hot day Donato Pavesi of the Molinari Sports Club in Italy took the lead at Crawley and won in 8 h 37 min 27 s. The distance that year was reported as 51 miles 1,607 yards (83.5 km).

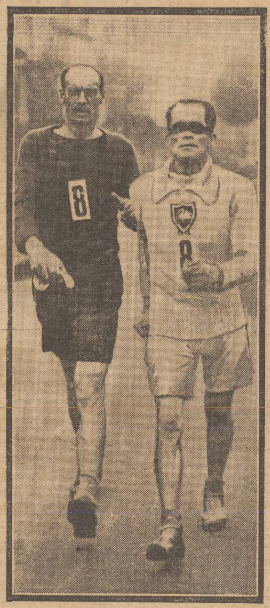
J. Ingram (right) of the Seaforth Highlanders, on his way to winning the London to Brighton walk for blind ex-servicemen in October 1924.

In 1922 St Dunstan's Hospice, a charity for blind ex-servicemen based in Brighton organised a walk from London to Brighton for fourteen of their residents. The servicemen were guided by volunteers from a number of athletic clubs, Belgrave Harriers, Blackheath Harriers, Polytechnic Harriers and Surrey Walking Club among them, and they were escorted on the road by members of the National Cyclists' Union and the Royal Automobile Club. Lord Cadogan started the race from Westminster Bridge at five o'clock in the morning and the winner, F. M. Cassidy of the Middlesex Regiment, arrived in Brighton 10 h 45 min 34 s later. This was repeated each year until 1927 when St Dunstan's changed to a 25-mile (40.2 km) walk on a closed circuit near Maidenhead. Around this time they established a relationship with the Stock Exchange Athletic Club and organised joint walking races around the Inner Circle and Outer Circle of Regent's Park in London, then after the Second World War residents of St Dunstans started participating in the Stock Exchange walk from London to Brighton. In the Stock Exchange walk in 1956, Billy Miller of St Dunstans completed the walk in 9 h 7 min 52 s.

In April 1922 Doris Joel, a daughter of the diamond magnate Solomon Joel announced that she was going to walk from London to Brighton to demonstrate that "girls were also able to perform long distance walks." That women could walk was not actually in doubt. Mrs. Harrison had walked 1,000 miles (1,609 km) in 1,000 hours on the Leeds to Whitehill road in December 1843. And Jane Dunn, a tailor's wife from Manchester, had repeated the feat at Pendleton near Manchester in 1853. As recently as 1920, Winifred Green from Bolton had competed in the 51 mile (82 km) Manchester to Blackpool walk, finishing in 12 h 32 min 25 s for twenty-fourth place in the open race. Doris Joel's announcement was motivated by a comment from a friend of her brother Wolfie, who had himself walked, for a bet, to Brighton, and told her that no woman could, or ever would, perform the feat.

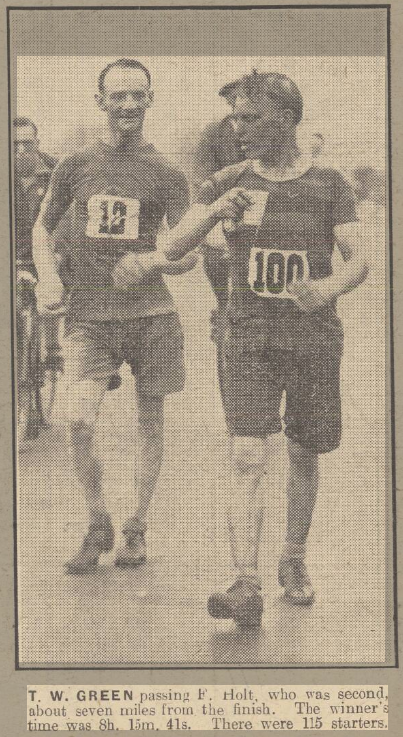
Thomas Green (left) of Belgrave Harriers, coming up to pass Frank Holt (Yorkshire WC) on his way to winning the London to Brighton walk in September 1929.

In response to her announcement Joel received a reply from Maud Brown and Christina Wright, two ladies who both worked at Gamages, the London department store, and claimed that they had already walked from London to Brighton. They offered to accompany her on her walk, and were willing to turn it into a race. They also claimed to have previously walked the 58 miles (93.3 km) from Beckenham to Clacton, and were confident they could walk to Brighton in a lot less than the twenty-four hours Joel had stated was her goal. Then Lilian Salkeld, a 16-year-old Manchester schoolgirl, also challenged Miss Joel. Lilian had completed a 33-mile (53.1 km) walk in 7 h 2 min 39 s and covered 42 miles (67.5 km) in a training walk and said she expected to get to Brighton in under thirteen hours. Doris Joel bet £50 that Lilian Salkeld would not get to Brighton in less than thirteen hours.

The start was to be from Big Ben at eight o'clock on the evening of Friday 28 April 1922. Doris Joel did not appear at the start and Maud Brown and Christina Wright simply walked from work, crossed over Westminster Bridge and carried on walking, in the same clothes they had worn at work that day, including their high-heeled shoes. There was a large crowd at Big Ben, some of whom were intent on preventing the event from taking place, and Lilian's start was delayed by ten minutes. She was dressed in a short-sleeved shirt-waister dress, short socks, stout walking shoes, and when it got cold at night she put on a woollen jumper and gloves. Her parents followed her in a car and she was accompanied by 10-year-old Georgie Edwards, the son of her coach, Albert Edwards, who was also in the car with her parents. Albert Edwards stopped after completing 30 miles (48.2 km) while Lilian Salkeld finished in 12 h 20 min and is the first female for whom there is independent evidence that she walked from London to Brighton.

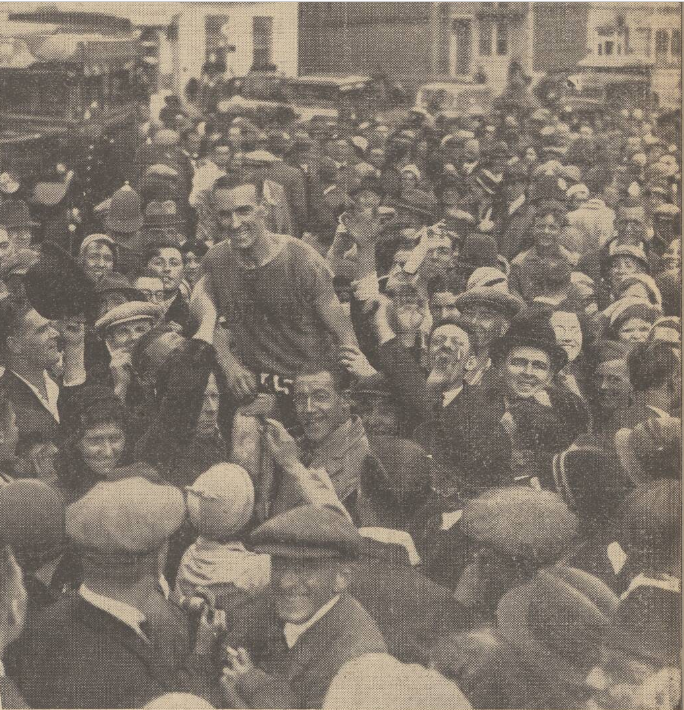
John Ludlow (Derby WC) being cheered on winning the London to Brighton walk in record time in September 1932.

Maud Brown and Christina Wright finished together at five minutes past eleven in the morning having taken 14 h 35 min. The details of their unverified claim to have completed the walk before are that they left Holborn at a quarter to six in the morning of Whit Sunday 1921, and after one or two setbacks on account of the weather arrived at Brighton a little before 12:30 am on the morning of Monday 8 May, having taken 18 h 45 min. On arrival they "placed themselves in the hands of a policeman," who found them lodgings at the Preston Park telephone exchange.

In 1923 the Surrey Open started at 7 o'clock in the morning on the first stroke of Big Ben. A 1905 walk organised by the Newspaper Trades Association started on the first stroke of Big Ben at midnight, but from 1923 it became the practice for races to be started by the sounding of the clock at 7 o'clock in the morning, and in the 1950s when annual running races started over the same route they also adopted the practice.

In 1927 a second Italian, Carlo Giani, a policeman from near Lake Como, won the event on a particularly hot day and in 1930 Thomas Green (Belgrave H.) broke the record set by Harold Ross in 1909, completing his walk in 8 h 2 min 55 s, opening up the possibility that less than eight hours might be possible. "I have beaten the record and this is one of the proudest moments in my life," he said.

Olympic champion Harold Whitlock (Metropolitan WC) won the London to Brighton walk in 1935, becoming the first man to cover the distance in less than eight hours and establishing a record that stood until 1956. He was also the first man to win the event in four consecutive years. Billy Baker (Queen's Park H.) and Thomas Green (Belgrave H.) had both won it four times, but not consecutively. Whitlock won it in 1934-37 but in 1938 was in Paris winning the European Championship 50 km walk when Tommy Richardson (Woodford Green AC) won the London to Brighton. Richardson, world record holder at 12 hours and 100 miles, was the holder of the much coveted Centurion number 100, and was later elected president of the Centurions.

In 1939 the universities of Oxford and Cambridge organised a relay walking match from London to Brighton. Teams of five started from the clock tower by Westminster Bridge at seven o'clock on the morning of Saturday 20 May, with handovers at Croydon, Redhill, Peas Pottage, and Sayers Common. Oxford were represented by R. M. Hanson (Worcester), J. R. C. Boys (St Peter's Hall), J. Allen (St Peter's Hall), F. Pickering (St Peter's Hall), and F. D. K. Williams (Balliol). Cambridge, who won the match by one minute and one second in 8 h 33 min 47 s, were represented by F. S. Carter (Queen's), I. R. Menzies (Jesus), P. W. Coggins (Jesus), F. J. G. Marley (Queen's), and D. R. Carter (Queen's).

The event scheduled for Saturday 1 September 1939 had to be cancelled due to the start of the Second World War and the next walk was not held until 1946. At that point the record stood to Harold Whitlock at 7 h 53 min 50 s and Surrey WC were leading the team contest with ten wins, Belgrave Harriers were next with eight wins. The only other clubs to have won by that point were Birmingham WC (1931) and Leicester WC (1938).

After the war competition resumed in 1946 when Leicester Walking Club retained the team prize they had won in 1938, so they held the Edward Knott Memorial Shield, first presented in 1929, for a record nine years. Apart from that anomaly the longest winning streak was four consecutive wins by Belgrave Harriers (1967–70). Before the race ended, in 1984, only eleven clubs won this trophy, and only four of them won it more than once. Belgrave Harriers (24) won it most often, with Surrey Walking Club (23) a close second. Leicester Walking Club's three wins places them third on the list. (Note: Team winners: Belgrave H. (24), Surrey WC (23), Leicester WC (3), Polytechnic H. (2), Birmingham WC (1), Brighton & Hove AC (1), Coventry Godiva H. (1), Enfield AC (1), Highgate H. (1), Metropolitan WC (1), Woodford Green AC (1).)

The Road Walking Association, governing body for the sport, changed their name to the Race Walking Association in September 1954, and at that time the rules stipulated that competitors in long-distance walks of more than 20 miles (32.1 km) had to be at least 21-years-old. Don Thompson (Metropolitan WC) celebrated his 21st birthday in 1954 by submitting his entry for the London to Brighton road walk, and duly finished second to Norman Guilmant of Belgrave Harriers. At that point Harold Whitlock's 1935 record still stood and the best time by anyone else was Tommy Richardson's 8 h 8 min 1 s from 1938.

In 1955 Thompson won the event in 8 h 6 min 24 s and the following year he carved eight minutes off Whitlock's record. In 1957 he took a further ten minutes off his own record with 7 h 35 min 12 s, the biggest single improvement in the record since 1904. Thompson then won the race a further five years in succession, making eight consecutive wins overall. He came back in 1967 to add a ninth win to his tally.

The race had its third foreign winner in 1965, when another Italian, the reigning Olympic 50 km champion Abdon Pamich, won the race with Thompson in second place. Shaul Ladany of Israel, who won the event three times (1970-71-73), completes the roster of foreign winners. Carlo Giani, who won the race in 1927, returned to Brighton for the 1977 race as a spectator, and was guest of honour at the prize-giving dinner in the evening.

Dwindling numbers of competitors, from over 100 starters in the 1950s to less than 20 by 1982, and difficulties with ensuring the safety of participants with appropriate numbers of marshals meant that the Surrey Open was last held in 1984. The Stock Exchange carried on with their walk for a few years, experimented with starting it earlier or switching to a Sunday but these changes did not solve the problem. After missing a year in 2002 they held a celebratory centenary walk in 2003, and the London to Brighton walk was no more.

The oldest person to have completed the walk in a competitive event is believed to be Tommy Hall of Sheffield who first walked from London to Brighton in 1922 when he was 72-years-old, and finished in 11 h 34 min 42 s, came back the next year and finished and in 1924 he collapsed when four miles from the finish. Harold B. Rhodes won the Stock Exchange walk in 1920-21-22, and his son, also Harold Rhodes, won the same event in 1952. Harold Whitlock won the event four times, and his younger brother George also won it four times, but only Harold's wins were consecutive. The first brothers to complete the walk in the same year were Stan and Maurice Horton in 1947, the first father and son were Brian and Dave Saunders in 1972 and the first father and daughter were Liz Claridge and her father Martin Ford-Dun in 1999.

== To Brighton and back ==
In 1897 Edward "Teddy" Knott of South London Harriers set a record for the walk from London to Brighton, becoming the first man to do it in less than nine hours. But he rather modestly supposed that there were other men who could beat his record, so in 1899, with a couple of other members of South London Harriers, he formed Surrey Walking Club. In September 1900 this club announced their intention to arrange a walk from London to Brighton and back to permit members to attempt the feat of walking 100 miles (160.9 km) in 24 hours. The route they eventually chose for this was to walk from their headquarters, the Swan and Sugar Loaf Hotel, in Brighton Road, Croydon, north to London, then turn round and walk back past their start point and continue on to Brighton, and then return to Croydon. They made this 104 miles 1,130 yards (168.4 km), so that allowing for any miscalculations, it met their criteria of being at least 100 miles (160.9 km).

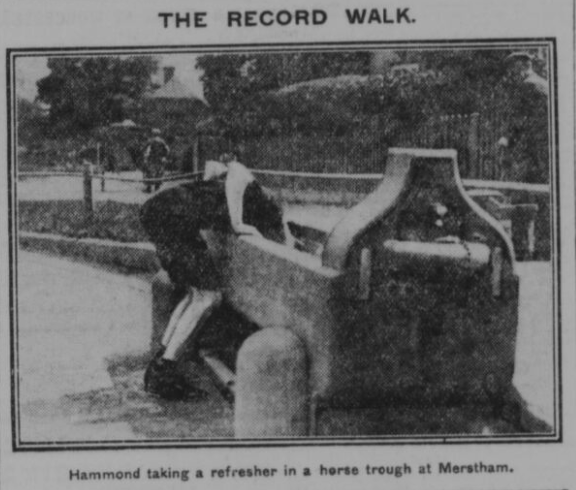
Thomas E. Hammond (Blackheath H.) cooling off at a horse trough at Merstham during his record-breaking walk from London to Brighton and back on Saturday 22 June 1907.

The man who organised this walk was a London solicitor called Ernest Neville, a club member, a keen walker, and over sixty years later at the age of 80 he will still be found organising running and walking races over the Brighton road. The walk did not actually come off until the end of 1902, and was for club members only. They had ten entries, only nine of whom turned up at the start, at nine o'clock on the evening of Friday 31 October. But G. H. Schofield, a non-member, also turned up at the start and asked if he could walk with them. Since he had walked 16 miles (25.7 km) just to get to the start they didn't think he would provide much opposition and willingly agreed to let him take part. That made ten starters, including Ernest Neville the organiser, only four of whom reached Brighton, and only three of them finished the whole event. The favourite was John "Jack" Butler, who owned all the amateur walking records from 14 miles (22.5 km) to 21 miles (33.7 km), and who justified his status with his winning margin of almost an hour in 21 h 36 min 27 s. Mr Schofield, the stranger who had no chance, finished second. The only other club member to finish was W. J. Taylor.

There are only two known prior occasions when the double journey had been accomplished. In 1803 Captain Robertson of the South Gloucester Militia walked from Brighton to London and back for a wager of 40 guineas, and in 1868 Benjamin Trench wagered that he could do it in 25 hours and succeeded with two hours to spare. Surrey Walking Club were not particularly concerned that it should be from London to Brighton, what mattered to them was that it was 100 miles, and they offered a gold medal to any club member who could complete this distance in twenty-four hours or less.

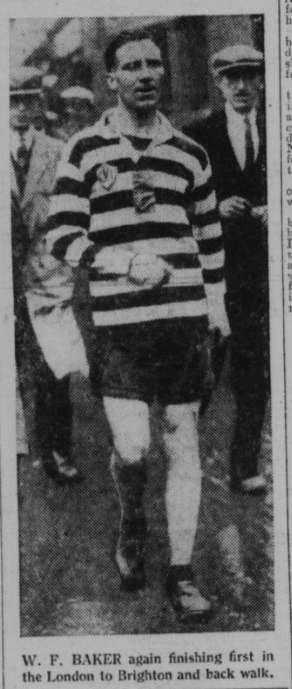
W.F. "Billy" Baker of Queen's Park Harriers completing his second consecutive win in the London to Brighton and back walk on Saturday 22 June 1929.

In 1903 they organised another of these events, that they did not call races. They referred to these as "trials". They were for members to attempt to earn the gold medal, and they did this in company with others because that made sense, but it was not a race, as such, and the first man home didn't "win," anything other than the gold medal, if he did it in time. There were six starters for the 1903 trial, and five of them finished and earned the gold medal for beating 24 hours. First man home was H. W. Horton, in 20 h 31 min 53 s, while Ernest Neville, who was by now the club secretary, finished third in 21 h 13 min 50 s.

There were other opportunities to earn the gold medal. Apart from 24-hour track races, Bath to London was 100 miles (160.9 km), Birmingham to London was 103 miles (165.7 km), and Blackpool to Manchester and back was also 100 miles, so it was not until June 1907 that the club organised another of these trials. The first of the six men to finish inside 24 hours and earn their medal was Thomas Hammond (Blackheath H.) who passed 50 miles (80.4 km) in 8 h 26 min, 100 miles in 17 h 25 min 22 s, which beat the world best for that distance set by A. W. Sinclair at Lillie Bridge in August 1881, then went on to beat Horton's record by over two hours and finish in 18 h 13 min 37 s. The timekeeper for this trial was Teddy Knott, and both Jack Butler and H. W. Horton were judges.

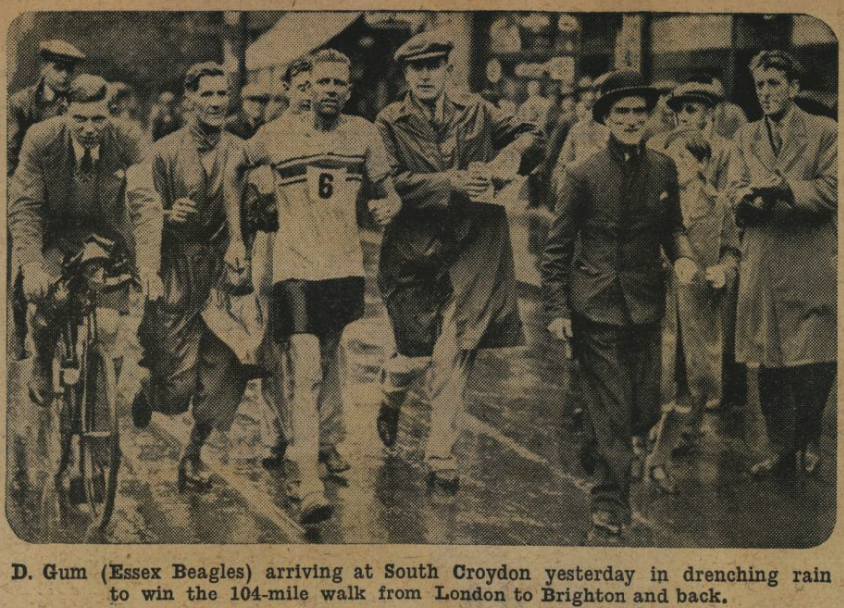
Dan Gum (Essex Beagles) winning the London to Brighton and back walk organised by Surrey Walking Club in June 1933.

From 1911 to 1914 they held five trials during which no new records were established but several changes took place. In May 1911 a meeting took place at the Ship & Turtle, an inn at 131 Leadenhall Street in London, to which all those amateurs who had achieved the goal of walking 100 miles in 24 hours in competition, in Britain, were invited, and they agreed to form a membership society - not a club - to be called Centurions. James Fowler-Dixon, who had achieved his qualifying walk the earliest, in 1877, was elected president for life. At the suggestion of Ernest Neville they decided to number members in chronological order of their achievement of the qualifying goal, so Fowler-Dixon became Centurion number 1, and Neville was number 7.

The first woman to qualify for membership of the Centurions was Ann Sayer (Essex Ladies) who completed the Bristol 100 miles walk in 1977, and less than an hour and a half later Dianne Pegg (Medway AC) qualified in the same event. They are Centurions number 599 and 608 respectively.

In 1913 Thomas Hammond and Ernest Neville purchased a trophy, a two-foot tall "elegant nymph" mounted on a plinth, subsequently named the Hammond-Neville Trophy, to be awarded to the winner of the London to Brighton and back walk. So that it is now unequivocably a race. The first winner of this was Harold B. S. Rhodes (Stock Exchange AC), who finished in 20 h 53 min 22 s on Saturday 7 June 1913. The statuette is now lost but the Centurions retain the plinth.

In October 1913 Surrey Walking Club held a second London to Brighton and back walk that year, and the 1914 race was sponsored by a magazine called Health and Safety and included a veterans race, with competitors over 45 years of age starting forty-five minutes before the rest of the field. This was won by Edgar Broad (Surrey WC), who had won the first Stock Exchange walk from London to Brighton in 1903.

After the First World War events resumed in 1921 with a near-record twelve starters, but on a scorching hot day only three of these finished. First was Edgar Horton (Surrey WC) in 19 h 50 min 41 s, the best time since 1907. Up to this point races had followed a familiar pattern; one or more early leaders would gradually fall away to let the winner emerge from a more modest early pace. At the next race, in June 1926, W. F. "Billy" Baker of Queen's Park Harriers adopted different tactics and led from the start, followed closely by the Italian Olympian Donato Pavesi until they got to Brighton. Pavesi had won the London to Brighton walk in 1921, and Baker won it in 1924 and 1925, but when they turned round to head back to Croydon Baker moved ahead and Edgar Horton overtook the Italian for second place. By Handcross (80 miles 1,100 yards, 129.7 km) Baker had got almost a minute inside Hammond's record from 1907, and he continued to gain ground until he got to Redhill where the sole of one shoe came off and he had to stop and change his shoes. Although he missed Hammond's 100 miles record he forced the pace over the closing miles and stole over seven minutes from the nineteen-year-old record for the full distance.

From 1929 Surrey Walking Club proposed to hold the race on a four-year cycle, in the year after the Olympic Games, so there were further races in 1933 and 1937, but this schedule was amended by the Second World War. After the event was revived in 1947, when the winner was Stan Horton, the son of Edgar Horton who had won it in 1921, the schedule switched to being the year before the Olympic Games. There were no further revisions to the record set by Billy Baker in 1926, but one other man, Frank O'Reilly of Lozells Harriers, managed to win it twice in succession. By the 1960s road improvements and the sheer volume of traffic meant that it was no longer considered safe to be holding this event on public roads and it was last held on 24 June 1967 when it got its first foreign winner.

Arthur St Norman, who won the 1912 race, was technically a foreigner, because he represented South Africa in the Olympic Games in Stockholm, but he was born in Brighton and lived there for many years. The only person normally resident abroad to win the London to Brighton and back walk was Gerd Nickel from Hamburg, in what was then called West Germany. The weather was terrible and he had the slowest winning time since 1913, but none of that mattered when he became the last ever winner of the Hammond-Neville Trophy.

The race was held nineteen times in sixty-five years and had seventeen different winners. Less than 450 men started and fewer than 180 of them finished, and not all of those finished at their first attempt. W. N. Boys (Finchley H.) started in 1921 and 1926 but finally finished in 1929 when he became Centurion number 89. Some also finished their walk at the 100 miles point having achieved their goal of earning their medal and qualifying for the Centurions. One man to do this was Arthur Winter (Polytechnic H.) in 1929. There are no records of a woman ever starting in the race or of a woman ever walking from London to Brighton and back independently.

== Performance progression ==
The route necessarily changed over the years as roads were altered, widened and straightened, with the invention of roundabouts, the construction of bridges, underpasses, new housing estates and of Gatwick airport. There was at one time a level crossing on the route and in 1909 Thomas Hammond had to stand and wait for a train to pass before he could continue. An underpass was eventually constructed there but one year that was flooded. The road surface itself also changed quite drastically. In 1903 it rained heavily the night before the walk and the road to Brighton was a quagmire of soft slushy mud that bears no comparison with the tarmac surface and storm drains of the 1950s. So there is not a single route from London to Brighton and it may not be valid to compare times achieved in different years. However, this is a chronological list of the shortest times achieved in walking from London to Brighton in an organised competitive event. For a complete list of winners, see: List of winners of the London to Brighton walk.

Progression of London to Brighton Walking Record
Time hh:mm:ss	Athlete (affiliation)	Date
10:52:00	Percival J. Burt (London Athletic Club)	22 Sep 1872
9:48:00	Charles L. O'Malley (London Athletic Club)	29 Mar 1884
9:25:08	J.A. McIntosh (Compton Cricket Club)	10 Apr 1886
9:07:07	W. Franks (professional)	4 Aug 1895
8:56:44	Edward Knott (South London H.)	10 Apr 1897
8:43:16	John Butler (Surrey Walking Club)	14 Mar 1903
8:26:57	Thomas E. Hammond (Blackheath H.)	9 Apr 1904
8:23:27	John Butler (Surrey Walking Club)	22 Sep 1906
8:18:18	Thomas E. Hammond (Blackheath H.)	1 May 1909
8:11:14	Harold V.L. Ross (Tooting AC)	4 Sep 1909
8:02:55	Thomas W. Green (Belgrave H.)	12 Sep 1930
8:01:06	John H. Ludlow (Derby Walking Club)	10 Sep 1932
7:53:50	Harold H. Whitlock (Metropolitan Walking Club)	7 Sep 1935
7:45:32	Donald J. Thompson (Metropolitan Walking Club)	8 Sep 1956
7:35:12	Donald J. Thompson (Metropolitan Walking Club)	14 Sep 1957

Progression of Women's London to Brighton Walking Record
Time hh:mm:ss	Athlete (affiliation)	Date
18:45:00	Maud Brown & Christina Wright	7–8 May 1921
12:20:00	Lilian Salkeld (aged 16)	28-29 Apr 1922
9:37:35	Sandra Brown (Surrey Walking Club)	3 Sep 1983
9:04:40	Sandra Brown (Surrey Walking Club)	17 May 2003

== See also ==
- London to Brighton events

== General references ==
- Brighton and Its Coaches: A History of the London and Brighton Road (1894) by William C. A. Blew
- The Brighton Road (1906) by Charles G. Harper (1863–1943)
- Centurions Handbook (2011)
- Surrey Walking Club results archive
