= 1962 European Athletics Championships – Men's 50 kilometres walk =

Men's 50 kilometres walk at the European Athletics Championships

The men's 50 kilometres race walk at the 1962 European Athletics Championships was held in Belgrade, then Yugoslavia, on 14 September 1962.

== Medalists ==
Gold	Abdon Pamich; Italy
Silver	Grigoriy Panichkin; Soviet Union
Bronze	Donald Thompson; Great Britain

== Results ==
=== Final ===
14 September

Rank	Name	Nationality	Time	Notes
1st place, gold medalist(s)	Abdon Pamich	Italy	4:19:46.6	
2nd place, silver medalist(s)	Grigoriy Panichkin	Soviet Union	4:24:35.6	
3rd place, bronze medalist(s)	Donald Thompson	Great Britain	4:29:00.2	
4	Christoph Höhne	East Germany	4:29:37.8	
5	John Ljunggren	Sweden	4:30:19.8	
6	István Havasi	Hungary	4:34:14.8	
7	Hannes Koch	East Germany	4:38:34.0	
8	Horst Astroth	East Germany	4:39:49.0	
9	Ingvar Green	Sweden	4:40:08.0	
10	Joël Vanderhaegen	Belgium	4:41:31.0	
11	Alexandr Bílek	Czechoslovakia	4:42:23.0	
12	Ladislav Moc	Czechoslovakia	4:48:31.6	
13	Eric Hall	Great Britain	4:55:47.0	
14	Alfred Leiser	Switzerland	4:57:28.0	
15	Stefano Serchinic	Italy	5:13:20.4	
	Anatoly Vedyakov	Soviet Union	DNF	
	Charles Sowa	Luxembourg	DNF	
	Elio Massi	Italy	DNF	
	Erwin Stutz	Switzerland	DNF	
	Grigory Klimov	Soviet Union	DQ	
	Ray Middleton	Great Britain	DQ	

== Participation ==
According to an unofficial count, 21 athletes from 10 countries participated in the event.

- Belgium (1)
- Czechoslovakia (2)
- East Germany (3)
- Hungary (1)
- Italy (3)
- Luxembourg (1)
- Soviet Union (3)
- Sweden (2)
- Switzerland (2)
- Great Britain (3)
