= Athletics at the 1957 World Festival of Youth and Students =

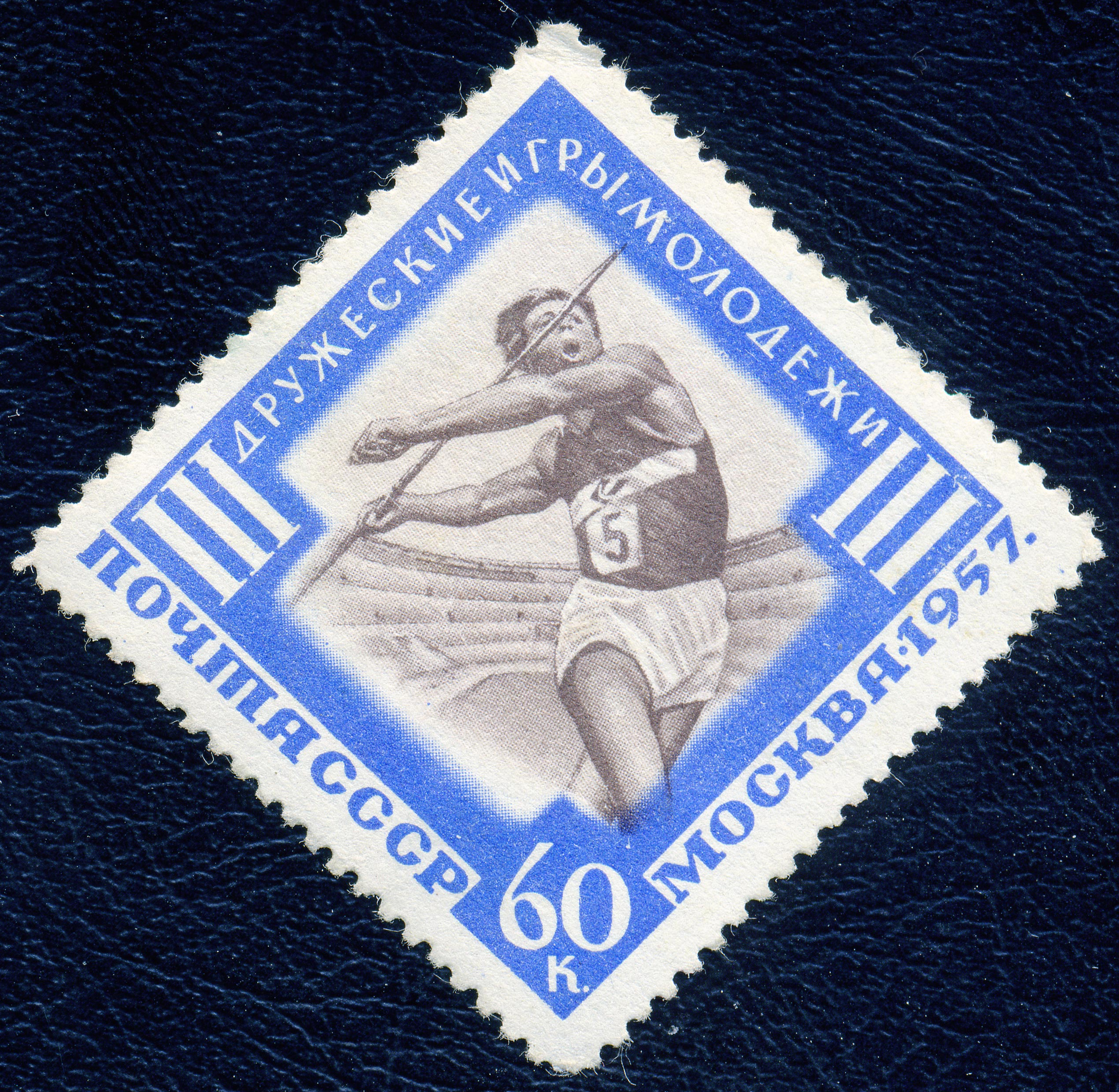
Soviet stamp marking athletics at the 1957 World Festival of Youth and Students

The 6th World Festival of Youth and Students featured an athletics competition among its programme of events. The events were contested in Moscow, Soviet Union in August 1957. Mainly contested among Eastern European athletes, it served as an alternative to the more Western European-oriented 1957 World University Games held in Paris the same year in September.

Many top Soviet athletes were present and the event and the nation won the most titles. Pyotr Bolotnikov won the 10,000 metres – a feat which preceded a 1960 Olympic win at the distance. Semyon Rzhishchin, the steeplechase world record holder, won his specialist event, but Olympic walking champion Leonid Spirin settled for runner-up spot. In the triple jump, Leonid Shcherbakov failed an attempt to win a fifth straight title at the festival, being beaten by two-time and reigning Olympic champion Adhemar da Silva, who claimed Brazil's first gold in festival history. Javelin thrower Janusz Sidło won a fourth straight world student title and his throw of 80.12 m (262 ft 10 1/4 in) marked the only time an athlete surpassed eighty metres at the competition. Yugoslavia was prominently represented by Franjo Mihalić, the Olympic runner-up and marathon winner here.

In women's events, former Olympic champion Galina Zybina won the shot put for a second time running, while in the discus her compatriot and fellow Olympic champion Nina Ponomaryova won her fourth straight gold at the festival. Also among the strong Soviet throwers were javelin specialist Inese Jaunzeme and Tamara Tyshkevich (both reigning Olympic champions). Iolanda Balaș had her third straight world student win in the high jump. She went on to win at the 1958 European Athletics Championships a year later, as did pentathlon winner Galina Bystrova and 800 m runner-up Yelizaveta Yermolayeva.

== Medal summary ==
=== Men ===
Event	Gold		Silver		Bronze	
100 metres	Marian Foik (POL)	10.5	Leonid Bartenyev (URS)	10.6	Mikhail Bachvarov (BUL)	10.7
200 metres	Sándor Jakabfy (HUN)	21.3	Leonid Bartenyev (URS)	21.3	Yuriy Konovalov (URS)	21.4
400 metres	Jaroslav Jirásek (TCH)	47.6	Ion Wiesenmayer (ROM)	47.7	Josef Trousil (TCH)	47.9
800 metres	Tadeusz Kaźmierski (POL)	1:48.2	Helfried Reinnagel (GDR)	1:48.5	Zoltan Vamoș (ROM)	1:49.4
1500 metres	Jonas Pipyné (URS)	3:41.1	Yevgeniy Sokolov (URS)	3:41.7	Stanislav Jungwirth (TCH)	3:41.7
5000 metres	Miklós Szabó (HUN)	13:51.8	Friedrich Janke (GDR)	13:52.0	Al Lawrence (AUS)	13:54.2
10,000 metres	Pyotr Bolotnikov (URS)	29:14.6	Al Lawrence (AUS)	29:16.4	Ivan Cherniavskyi (URS)	29:36.0
110 m hurdles	Stanko Lorger (YUG)	14.5	Boris Stolyarov (URS)	14.6	Yuriy Petrov (URS)	14.6
400 m hurdles	Yuriy Lituyev (URS)	51.2	Igor Ilyin (URS)	51.3	Pavel Syedov (URS)	53.9
3000 metres steeplechase	Semyon Rzhishchin (URS)	8:50.2	Ludvík Veselý (TCH)	8:51.8	Gyula Varga (HUN)	8:53.8
4 × 100 m relay	Soviet Union (URS); Boris Tokaryev; Yuriy Konovalov; Albert Plaskeyev; Leonid Bartenyev	40.2	Poland (POL); Zenon Baranowski; Marian Foik; Jan Jarzembowski; Henryk Grabowski	40.8	Iceland (ISL); Vilhjálmur Einarsson; Hilmar Þorbjörnsson; Daníel Halldórsson; Adólf Óskarsson	42.9
4 × 400 m relay	Soviet Union (URS); Leopold Shupilov; Vladimir Yefishin; Valentin Rakhmanov; Mikhail Nikolskiy	3:11.1	Czechoslovakia (TCH); Stanislav Jungwirth; Jozef Kočiš; Josef Trousil; Jaroslav Jirásek	3:12.6	East Germany (GDR); Helmut Hengst; Karl-Heinz Kruse; Helfried Reinnagel; Walter Meier	3:13.7
Marathon	Franjo Mihalić (YUG)	2:21:24	Albert Ivanov (URS)	2:22:30	Sergey Popov (URS)	2:24:05
20 km walk	Antanas Mikénas (URS)	1:33:02	Leonid Spirin (URS)	1:33:02	Grigoriy Panichkin (URS)	1:33:20
50 km walk	Mikhail Lavrov (URS)	4:23:29	Anatoly Vedyakov (URS)	4:25:00	Grigory Klimov (URS)	4:26:05
High jump	Yuriy Stepanov (URS)	2.13 m	Igor Kashkarov (URS)	2.13 m	Volodymyr Sitkin (URS)	2.01 m
Pole vault	Vitaliy Chernobay (URS)	4.50 m	Vladimir Bulatov (URS) Manfred Preussger (GDR)	4.40 m	Not awarded	
Long jump	Henryk Grabowski (POL)	7.46 m	Yevgeniy Chen (URS)	7.43 m	Branko Miler (YUG)	7.25 m
Triple jump	Adhemar da Silva (BRA)	15.92 m	Vilhjálmur Einarsson (ISL)	15.90 m	Leonid Shcherbakov (URS)	15.76 m
Shot put	Jiří Skobla (TCH)	17.20 m	Jaroslav Plíhal (TCH)	16.98 m	Vartan Ovsepyan (URS)	16.94 m
Discus throw	Karel Merta (TCH)	53.55 m	Boris Matveyev (URS)	52.43 m	Edmund Piątkowski (POL)	52.19 m
Hammer throw	Mikhail Krivonosov (URS)	62.91 m	Zvonko Bezjak (YUG)	62.35 m	Anatoliy Samotsvetov (URS)	62.13 m
Javelin throw	Janusz Sidło (POL)	80.12 m	Jan Kopyto (POL)	76.70 m	Vladimir Kuznetsov (URS)	76.44 m
Decathlon	Yuriy Kutenko (URS)	7294 pts	Walter Meier (GDR)	7193 pts	Helmut Hengst (GDR)	6574 pts

=== Women ===
Event	Gold		Silver		Bronze	
100 metres	Vera Krepkina (URS)	11.9	Gisela Köhler (GDR)	12.0	Galina Popova (URS)	12.0
200 metres	Gisela Köhler (GDR)	23.9	Mariya Itkina (URS)	24.0	Albina Kobranova (URS)	24.4
400 metres	Antonina Khomutova (URS)	54.4	Ursula Donath (GDR)	54.7	Mariya Itkina (URS)	54.7
800 metres	Ursula Donath (GDR)	2:07.8	Yelizaveta Yermolayeva (URS)	2:08.1	Gizella Sasvári (HUN)	2:08.7
80 m hurdles	Nelli Yeliseyeva (URS)	10.8	Gisela Köhler (GDR)	10.8	Galina Bystrova (URS)	11.0
4 × 100 m relay	Soviet Union (URS); Mariya Itkina; Vera Krepkina; Galina Popova; Nina Dyekonskaya	46.0	East Germany (GDR); Gisela Köhler-Birkemeyer; Bärbel Mayer; Brigitte Weinmeister; Margot Eichler	46.3	Czechoslovakia (TCH); Miroslava Trkalová; Bedriska Müllerová; Anna Pišková ?	51.2
High jump	Iolanda Balas (ROM)	1.66 m	Mariya Pisareva (URS)	1.66 m	Valentina Ballod (URS)	1.66 m
Long jump	Vilve Maremäe (URS)	5.87 m	Nadezhda Dvalishvili (URS)	5.82 m	Nelli Yeliseyeva (URS)	5.81 m
Shot put	Galina Zybina (URS)	16.26 m	Tamara Tyshkevich (URS)	16.14 m	Zinaida Doinikova (URS)	15.64 m
Discus throw	Nina Ponomaryova (URS)	53.13 m	Irina Beglyakova (URS)	52.04 m	Štepánka Mertová (TCH)	50.42 m
Javelin throw	Inese Jaunzeme (URS)	51.60 m	Maria Diţi (ROM)	50.06 m	Eleonora Bogun (URS)	49.92 m
Pentathlon	Galina Bystrova (URS)	4560 pts	Vilve Maremäe (URS)	4413 pts	Lidiya Shmakova (URS)	4283 pts

== Medal table ==
Rank	Nation	Gold	Silver	Bronze	Total
1	Soviet Union (URS)	21	19	21	61
2	Poland (POL)	4	2	1	7
3	Czechoslovakia (TCH)	3	3	4	10
4	East Germany (GDR)	2	8	2	12
5	Yugoslavia (YUG)	2	1	0	3
6	Hungary (HUN)	2	0	2	4
7	Romania (ROM)	1	2	1	4
8	Brazil (BRA)	1	0	0	1
9	Australia (AUS)	0	1	1	2
9	Iceland (ISL)	0	1	1	2
11	Bulgaria (BUL)	0	0	1	1
Totals (11 entries)		36	37	34	107

== See also ==
- FISU World University Games § Precursors
- University and college sport
