= List of winners of the London to Brighton walk =

Long-distance walking race held on public roads in England

The London to Brighton walk was a long distance walking race held on public roads from Westminster Bridge over the river Thames in London, England, to Brighton on the south coast. The route went through Croydon, Redhill, Crawley, Hickstead and Dale Hill, and finished at the Aquarium on the sea front at Brighton. The actual distance varied over the years as new roads were built, and existing roads were altered, but the programme for one race in 1897 advertised the distance as 51 miles 1,320 yards (83.2km).

The first race was held in 1872, between two men. In April 1886 South London Harriers and Ealing Harriers organised a race for their club members. In April 1897 Polytechnic Harriers organised an open amateur walking race with generous prizes that had thirty-seven starters. In 1903 there were at least ten races from London to Brighton but many of these were never held again and from 1919 there were just two events being held regularly. Surrey Walking Club organised an open race held usually in September each year, and the Stock Exchange Athletic Club held a race for their own members each May. The first woman to cover the distance was 16-year-old Lilian Salkeld in 1922, and that same year there was a race for blind ex-servicemen, residents at St Dunstan's Hospice, in Brighton. From 1902 there was also a walk from London to Brighton and back. This was held at infrequent intervals until 1967 when it was decided that the roads were too busy for it to be safe to continue to hold this event on public roads. The Surrey Open walk continued until 1984, and the Stock Exchange walk was last held in their centenary year, 2003.

Edward Knott of South London Harriers was the first man to finish in less than nine hours. Harold Whitlock of the Metropolitan Walking Club was the first man under eight hours, and the men's record was set in 1957 by Donald Thompson (Metropolitan WC). The women's record is held by Sandra Brown of Surrey Walking Club. the record for the walk to Brighton and back was set by Billy Baker (Queen's Park H.) in 1926.

== London to Brighton ==
Winners of the London to Brighton Walk
| Date | Athlete | Time h:mm:ss | Promotor | Source |
|---|---|---|---|---|
| 10 Apr 1886 | J.A. McIntosh (Compton Cricket Club) | 9:25:08 | South London H. & Ealing H. | |
| 4 Aug 1895 | W. Franks (professional) | 9:07:07 | wager | |
| 10 Apr 1897 | Edward Knott (South London H.) | 8:56:44 | Polytechnic Harriers | |
| 7 Mar 1903 | F.B. Thompson (Ranelagh H.) | 9:40:14 | Ranelagh H. Club Walk | |
| 14 Mar 1903 | John Butler (Surrey WC) | 8:43:16 | Hairdressers AC | |
| 1 May 1903 | Edgar F. Broad | 9:30:01 | Stock Exchange | |
| 6 Jun 1903 | Harry F. Otway (Herne Hill H.) | 9:21:01 | Metropolitan Meat Market | |
| 14 Jun 1903 | A. Church (Locomotive) | 10:42:00 | London & South West Railways | |
| 4 Jul 1903 | George C. Toplis (Kentish Town) | 8:55:23 | Evening News (professional) | |
| 11 Jul 1903 | C. Furby (Kentish Town) | 9:55:00 | Evening News (amateur) | |
| 18 Jul 1903 | G. Holmes | 9:51:20 | Evening News (amateur) | |
| 9 Apr 1904 | Thomas E. Hammond (Blackheath H.) | 8:26:57 | Ranelagh H. & Blackheath H. | |
| 1 May 1904 | F.W. Ward & F. Few dead heat | 10:22:32 | Newspaper Trades Association | |
| 4 Jun 1904 | J. Jaggers | 9:46:50 | Metropolitan Meat Market | |
| 7 May 1905 | F.W. Ward | 10:12:30 | Newspaper Trades Association | |
| 2 Sep 1905 | Ernest H. Neville (Surrey WC) | 9:47:52 | Surrey Walking Club | |
| 22 Sep 1906 | John Butler (Surrey WC) | 8:23:27 | Polytechnic Harriers | |
| 29 Sep 1907 | A. Hubbard (Surrey WC) | 8:51:00 | Surrey Walking Club | |
| 17 Oct 1908 | H.E. Lang (Surrey WC) | 9:30:36 | Surrey Walking Club | |
| 1 May 1909 | Thomas E. Hammond (Blackheath H.) | 8:18:18 | Surrey Walking Club | |
| 4 Sep 1909 | Harold V.L. Ross (Tooting AC) | 8:11:14 | Polytechnic Harriers | |
| 24 Sep 1910 | Sidney C. Schofield (Surrey WC) | 8:26:58 | Surrey Walking Club | |
| 29 Oct 1910 | Thomas P. Fox (Vegetarian AC) | 8:56:44 | Vegetarian Athletic Club | |
| 29 Jul 1911 | A.R. Edwards (Lancashire WC) | 9:24:01 | Electrical Trades Association | |
| 30 Sep 1911 | Tommy Payne (North Shields Polytechnic) | 8:20:06 | Polytechnic H. & Surrey WC | |
| 1 May 1912 | Thomas E. Hammond | 8:44:10 | Stock Exchange | |
| 14 Sep 1912 | Edgar C. Horton (Surrey WC) | 8:40:20 | Surrey WC & Middlesex AC | |
| 27 Sep 1913 | Edgar C. Horton (Surrey WC) | 8:36:08 | Polytechnic H. & Surrey WC | |
| 18 Oct 1913 | A.T. Gardiner (London News Agency) | 10:22:40 | London News Agencies | |
| 1 May 1914 | Harry E. Shattock | 8:59:26 | Stock Exchange | |
| 13 Sep 1919 | Tommy Payne (Yorkshire WC) | 8:38:23 | Surrey Walking Club | |
| 1 May 1920 | Harold B.S. Rhodes | 9:37:52 | Stock Exchange | |
| 25 Sep 1920 | Tommy Payne (Yorkshire WC) | 8:21:33 | Surrey Walking Club | |
| 30 Apr 1921 | Harold B.S. Rhodes | 9:16:23 | Stock Exchange | |
| 8 Oct 1921 | Donato Pavesi (Molinari Sports Club, ITA) | 8:37:27 | Surrey Walking Club | |
| 29 Apr 1922 | Harold B.S. Rhodes | 9:13:55 | Stock Exchange | |
| 23 Sep 1922 | Edgar C. Horton (Surrey WC) | 8:27:12 | Surrey Walking Club | |
| 21 Oct 1922 | F.M. Cassidy (Middlesex Regt.) | 10:45:34 | St Dunstan's Hospice | |
| 28 Apr 1923 | H. St G. Taylor | 9:28:35 | Stock Exchange | |
| 15 Sep 1923 | Frederick W. Poynton (Leicester H.) | 8:35:37 | Surrey Walking Club | |
| 6 Oct 1923 | W. Birch (1st Life Guards) | 10:33:02 | St Dunstan's Hospice | |
| 3 May 1924 | H.J. Grimwade | 9:25:46 | Stock Exchange | |
| 13 Sep 1924 | W.F. "Billy" Baker (Queen's Park H.) | 8:40:51 | Surrey Walking Club | |
| 4 Oct 1924 | Jack Ingram (Seaforth Highlanders) | 10:32:25 | St Dunstan's Hospice | |
| 1 May 1925 | Stanley M. Ayles | 8:51:52 | Stock Exchange | |
| 12 Sep 1925 | W.F. "Billy" Baker (Queen's Park H.) | 8:16:16 | Surrey Walking Club | |
| 26 Sep 1925 | Jack Ingram (Seaforth Highlanders) | 9:57:20 | St Dunstan's Hospice | |
| 1 May 1926 | Stanley M. Ayles | 8:51:25 | Stock Exchange | |
| 5 Jun 1926 | Jack Ingram (Seaforth Highlanders) | 10:01:55 | St Dunstan's Hospice | |
| 11 Sep 1926 | W.F. "Billy" Baker (Queen's Park H.) | 8:39:39 | Surrey Walking Club | |
| 30 Apr 1927 | Stanley M. Ayles | 8:44:15 | Stock Exchange | |
| 10 Sep 1927 | Carlo Giani (Italy) | 8:18:33 | Surrey Walking Club | |
| 28 Apr 1928 | William F. Bascombe | 9:24:45 | Stock Exchange | |
| 8 Sep 1928 | W.F. "Billy" Baker (Queen's Park H.) | 8:32:39 | Surrey Walking Club | |
| 27 Apr 1929 | Thomas D. Mullins | 9:08:39 | Stock Exchange | |
| 14 Sep 1929 | Thomas W. Green (Belgrave H.) | 8:15:41 | Surrey Walking Club | |
| 3 May 1930 | Sydney H. Schlesinger | 9:00:15 | Stock Exchange | |
| 12 Sep 1930 | Thomas W. Green (Belgrave H.) | 8:02:55 | Surrey Walking Club | |
| 1 May 1931 | Harold A. Hake | 9:04:32 | Stock Exchange | |
| 12 Sep 1931 | Thomas W. Green (Belgrave H.) | 8:05:43 | Surrey Walking Club | |
| 30 Apr 1932 | Lawrence J. Hollyer | 8:52:50 | Stock Exchange | |
| 10 Sep 1932 | John H. Ludlow (Derby WC) | 8:01:06 | Surrey Walking Club | |
| 1 May 1933 | Lawrence J. Hollyer | 8:58:13 | Stock Exchange | |
| 9 Sep 1933 | Thomas W. Green (Belgrave H.) | 8:01:19 | Surrey Walking Club | |
| 1 May 1934 | Harold A. Hake | 8:42:33 | Stock Exchange | |
| 8 Sep 1934 | Harold H. Whitlock (Metropolitan WC) | 8:17:23 | Surrey Walking Club | |
| 27 Apr 1935 | Harold A. Hake | 8:53:13 | Stock Exchange | |
| 7 Sep 1935 | Harold H. Whitlock (Metropolitan WC) | 7:53:50 | Surrey Walking Club | |
| 2 May 1936 | Stanley R. D'Arcy | 9:11:34 | Stock Exchange | |
| 5 Sep 1936 | Harold H. Whitlock (Metropolitan WC) | 8:01:25 | Surrey Walking Club | |
| 1 May 1937 | Harold A. Hake | 8:44:44 | Stock Exchange | |
| 4 Sep 1937 | Harold H. Whitlock (Metropolitan WC) | 8:02:38 | Surrey Walking Club | |
| 30 Apr 1938 | Harold A. Hake | 8:36:14 | Stock Exchange | |
| 3 Sep 1938 | Tommy W. Richardson (Woodford Green AC) | 8:08:01 | Surrey Walking Club | |
| 6 May 1939 | E.H. Johnson (Surrey WC) | 8:56:06 | Stock Exchange | |
| 14 Sep 1946 | Harry J. Forbes (Birmingham WC) | 8:20:12 | Surrey Walking Club | |
| 3 May 1947 | E.H. Johnson (Surrey WC) | 9:26:07 | Stock Exchange | |
| 6 Sep 1947 | George B.R. Whitlock (Metropolitan WC) | 8:21:51 | Surrey Walking Club | |
| 1 May 1948 | E.H. Johnson (Surrey WC) | 9:03:42 | Stock Exchange | |
| 11 Sep 1948 | George B.R. Whitlock (Metropolitan WC) | 8:14:29 | Surrey Walking Club | |
| 30 Apr 1949 | Donald A. Tunbridge (Highgate H.) | 9:12:23 | Stock Exchange | |
| 10 Sep 1949 | Charles Megnin (Highgate H.) | 8:34:31 | Surrey Walking Club | |
| 29 Apr 1950 | W.G. Lawrence | 9:28:58 | Stock Exchange | |
| 9 Sep 1950 | George B.R. Whitlock (Metropolitan WC) | 8:19:13 | Surrey Walking Club | |
| 5 May 1951 | L.H. Griffiths (Insurance AA) | 9:18:05 | Stock Exchange | |
| 8 Sep 1951 | George B.R. Whitlock (Metropolitan WC) | 8:14:36 | Surrey Walking Club | |
| 24 May 1952 | Harold Rhodes | 9:17:32 | Stock Exchange | |
| 13 Sep 1952 | Vic W.G. Stone (Polytechnic AC) | 8:25:35 | Surrey Walking Club | |
| 16 May 1953 | Donald A. Tunbridge (Highgate H.) | 8:38:18 | Stock Exchange | |
| 12 Sep 1953 | Wilfrid T. Cowley (Surrey WC) | 8:20:38 | Surrey Walking Club | |
| 22 May 1954 | Richard E. Green (Surrey WC) | 9:01:33 | Stock Exchange | |
| 11 Sep 1954 | Norman Guilmant (Belgrave H.) | 8:20:44 | Surrey Walking Club | |
| 21 May 1955 | Richard E. Green (Surrey WC) | 8:42:34 | Stock Exchange | |
| 7 Sep 1955 | Donald J. Thompson (Metropolitan WC) | 8:06:24 | Surrey Walking Club | |
| 26 May 1956 | Richard E. Green (Surrey WC) | 8:47:35 | Stock Exchange | |
| 8 Sep 1956 | Donald J. Thompson (Metropolitan WC) | 7:45:32 | Surrey Walking Club | |
| 18 May 1957 | Richard E. Green (Surrey WC) | 8:54:36 | Stock Exchange | |
| 14 Sep 1957 | Donald J. Thompson (Metropolitan WC) | 7:35:12 | Surrey Walking Club | |
| 17 May 1958 | Richard E. Green (Surrey WC) | 8:48:43 | Stock Exchange | |
| 13 Sep 1958 | Donald J. Thompson (Metropolitan WC) | 7:49:57 | Surrey Walking Club | |
| 30 May 1959 | Richard E. Green (Surrey WC) | 8:33:34 | Stock Exchange | |
| 12 Sep 1959 | Donald J. Thompson (Metropolitan WC) | 7:35:28 | Surrey Walking Club | |
| 21 May 1960 | Richard E. Green (Surrey WC) | 8:29:26 | Stock Exchange | |
| 17 Sep 1960 | Donald J. Thompson (Metropolitan WC) | 7:37:42 | Surrey Walking Club | |
| 27 May 1961 | Richard E. Green (Surrey WC) | 8:33:53 | Stock Exchange | |
| 9 Sep 1961 | Donald J. Thompson (Metropolitan WC) | 7:39:57 | Surrey Walking Club | |
| 26 May 1962 | Ray C. Hall (Belgrave H.) | 7:58:33 | Stock Exchange | |
| 7 Sep 1962 | Donald J. Thompson (Metropolitan WC) | 7:49:58 | Surrey Walking Club | |
| 25 May 1963 | Ken J. W. Mason (Surrey WC) | 8:16:41 | Stock Exchange | |
| 7 Sep 1963 | Dennis Read (Steyning AC) | 8:06:58 | Surrey Walking Club | |
| 23 May 1964 | Ken J. W. Mason (Surrey WC) | 8:26:04 | Stock Exchange | |
| 5 Sep 1964 | George G. Hazle (Germiston Calles, RSA) | 8:25:20 | Surrey Walking Club | |
| 22 May 1965 | Ken J. W. Mason (Surrey WC) | 8:21:22 | Stock Exchange | |
| 3 Sep 1965 | Abdon Pamich (Italy) | 7:37:42 | Surrey Walking Club | |
| 21 May 1966 | Richard E. Green (Surrey WC) | 8:39:44 | Stock Exchange | |
| 3 Sep 1966 | Ken W. Mason (Surrey WC) | 8:21:37 | Surrey Walking Club | |
| 20 May 1967 | Richard E. Green (Surrey WC) | 8:59:47 | Stock Exchange | |
| 2 Sep 1967 | Donald J. Thompson (Metropolitan WC) | 7:55:12 | Surrey Walking Club | |
| 1 Jun 1968 | Sidney G. Pearson | 9:50:12 | Stock Exchange | |
| 7 Sep 1968 | Brian Eley (Bristol WC) | 8:00:50 | Surrey Walking Club | |
| 17 May 1969 | Richard E. Green (Surrey WC) | 9:12:02 | Stock Exchange | |
| 6 Sep 1969 | Brian Eley (Bristol WC) | 8:02:09 | Surrey Walking Club | |
| 16 May 1970 | Richard E. Green (Surrey WC) | 8:54:22 | Stock Exchange | |
| 5 Sep 1970 | Shaul Ladany (Israel) | 7:46:37 | Surrey Walking Club | |
| 22 May 1971 | Ken G. Tuson | 9:04:32 | Stock Exchange | |
| 4 Sep 1971 | Shaul Ladany (Israel) | 7:57:17 | Surrey Walking Club | |
| 20 May 1972 | Richard E. Green (Surrey WC) | 9:05:17 | Stock Exchange | |
| 9 Sep 1972 | Peter Selby (Surrey WC) | 8:13:47 | Surrey Walking Club | |
| 19 May 1973 | John B.B. Nye | 8:29:16 | Stock Exchange | |
| 1 Sep 1973 | Shaul Ladany (Israel) | 7:57:27 | Surrey Walking Club | |
| 18 May 1974 | John B.B. Nye | 8:24:29 | Stock Exchange | |
| 7 Sep 1974 | Ray Middleton (Belgrave H.) | 8:17:50 | Surrey Walking Club | |
| 17 May 1975 | David J. Stevens (Steyning AC) | 8:43:15 | Stock Exchange | |
| 5 Sep 1975 | Ray Middleton (Belgrave H.) | 8:10:27 | Surrey Walking Club | |
| 22 May 1976 | Adrian H. James (Borough of Enfield H.) | 8:18:12 | Stock Exchange | |
| 4 Sep 1976 | Peter Hodgkinson (Cambridge H.) | 8:06:13 | Surrey Walking Club | |
| 28 May 1977 | Adrian H. James (Borough of Enfield H.) | 8:38:06 | Stock Exchange | |
| 3 Sep 1977 | John Lees (Brighton & Hove AC) | 7:54:32 | Surrey Walking Club | |
| 20 May 1978 | Adrian H. James (Borough of Enfield H.) | 8:05:24 | Stock Exchange | |
| 2 Sep 1978 | Shaun Lightman (Metropolitan WC) | 8:06:39 | Surrey Walking Club | |
| 19 May 1979 | Roger J. Lancefield (Surrey WC) | 8:34:21 | Stock Exchange | |
| 1 Sep 1979 | Ian Richards (Coventry Godiva H.) | 8:08:22 | Surrey Walking Club | |
| 17 May 1980 | Roger J. Lancefield (Surrey WC) | 8:21:55 | Stock Exchange | |
| 6 Sep 1980 | Peter Selby (Surrey WC) | 8:21:35 | Surrey Walking Club | |
| 16 May 1981 | S. C. Davis | 9:14:02 | Stock Exchange | |
| 5 Sep 1981 | Carl Lawton (Belgrave H.) | 8:20:51 | Surrey Walking Club | |
| 15 May 1982 | D. Railton | 9:58:09 | Stock Exchange | |
| 4 Sep 1982 | John Warhurst (Sheffield WC) | 8:24:04 | Surrey Walking Club | |
| 14 May 1983 | David G. Jarman (Surrey WC) | 7:59:07 | Stock Exchange | |
| 3 Sep 1983 | Peter Hodgkinson (Cambridge H.) | 8:28:17 | Surrey Walking Club | |
| 12 May 1984 | K. D. Rodrigues | 9:08:19 | Stock Exchange | |
| 1 Sep 1984 | Brian Adams (Leicester WC) | 8:37:30 | Surrey Walking Club | |
| 1 Jun 1985 | Adrian H. James (Borough of Enfield H.) | 7:55:27 | Stock Exchange | |
| 31 May 1986 | Paul J. Jarman (Surrey WC) | 9:13:14 | Stock Exchange | |
| 30 May 1987 | Adrian H. James (Borough of Enfield H.) | 8:28:18 | Stock Exchange | |
| 21 May 1988 | R. Attfield | 9:40:02 | Stock Exchange | |
| 20 May 1989 | Paul G. King (Belgrave H.) | 9:51:43 | Stock Exchange | |
| 19 May 1990 | J. M. Harris-St John | 9:51:40 | Stock Exchange | |
| 19 May 1991 | J. M. Harris-St John | 9:34:14 | Stock Exchange | |
| 6 Jun 1992 | R. Best | 10:21:07 | Stock Exchange | |
| 22 May 1993 | J. M. Harris-St John | 9:59:06 | Stock Exchange | |
| 21 May 1994 | Paul G. King (Belgrave H.) | 9:22:44 | Stock Exchange | |
| 20 May 1995 | Paul G. King (Belgrave H.) | 9:18:16 | Stock Exchange | |
| 18 May 1996 | Paul G. King (Belgrave H.) | 9:23:16 | Stock Exchange | |
| 17 May 1997 | Paul G. King (Belgrave H.) | 10:17:39 | Stock Exchange | |
| 16 May 1998 | J. M. Harris-St John | 10:08:00 | Stock Exchange | |
| 15 May 1999 | Ian Statter (Surrey WC) | 9:30:13 | Stock Exchange (Open) | |
| 15 May 1999 | Paul G. King (Belgrave H.) | 9:40:01 | Stock Exchange | |
| 20 May 2000 | Ian Statter (Surrey WC) | 9:15:12 | Stock Exchange (Open) | |
| 20 May 2000 | Paul G. King (Belgrave H.) | 9:39:34 | Stock Exchange | |
| 19 May 2001 | Ian Statter (Surrey WC) | 9:29:21 | Stock Exchange (Open) | |
| 19 May 2001 | Paul G. King (Belgrave H.) | 9:35:33 | Stock Exchange | |
| 17 May 2003 | Mark Easton (Surrey WC) | 8:16:15 | Stock Exchange (Open) | |
| 17 May 2003 | Paul G. King (Belgrave H.) | 9:15:27 | Stock Exchange | |

== London to Brighton and back ==
Winners of the London to Brighton And Back Walk
| Date | Athlete (affiliation) | Time h:mm:ss |
|---|---|---|
| 12 Sep 1803 | Captain Robertson (South Gloucester Militia) | 21:20:00 |
| 20 Mar 1868 | Benjamin B. Trench (Oxford Un.) | 23:00:00 |
| 1 Nov 1902 | John Butler (Polytechnic H.) | 21:36:27 |
| 7 Nov 1903 | H.W. Horton (Surrey WC) | 20:31:53 |
| 22 Jun 1907 | Thomas E. Hammond (Blackheath H.) | 18:13:37 |
| 15 Jul 1911 | T.E. Bartlett (Surrey WC) | 25:37:30 |
| 31 Aug 1912 | Arthur C. St Norman (Surrey WC, RSA) | 21:18:45 |
| 7 Jun 1913 | Harold B.S. Rhodes (Stock Exchange AC) | 20:53:22 |
| 25 Oct 1913 | James E. Burwash (Surrey WC) | 23:45:02 |
| 18 Jul 1914 | Edgar F. Broad (Surrey WC) | 19:57:50 |
| 25 Jun 1921 | Edgar C. Horton (Surrey WC) | 19:50:41 |
| 19 Jun 1926 | W.F. "Billy" Baker (Queens Park H.) | 18:05:51 |
| 22 Jun 1929 | W.F. "Billy" Baker (Queens Park H.) | 18:38:08 |
| 24 Jun 1933 | Dan Gum (Essex Beagles) | 18:53:07 |
| 19 Jun 1937 | Jonnie F.L. Henderson (Sussex WC) | 18:37:40 |
| 21 Jun 1947 | Stan E. Horton (Surrey WC) | 18:56:20 |
| 7 Jul 1951 | A.J. "Jack" Stirling-Wakeley (Belgrave H.) | 18:46:00 |
| 2 Jul 1955 | Hew D. Neilson (Woodford Green AC) | 18:26:27 |
| 4 Jul 1959 | Frank O'Reilly (Lozells H.) | 18:56:28 |
| 6 Jul 1963 | Frank O'Reilly (Lozells H.) | 18:43:53 |
| 24 Jun 1967 | Gerd Nickel (Hamburg SP, FRG) | 20:46:51 |

== See also ==
- London to Brighton events
- London to Brighton walk

== General references ==
- Brighton and Its Coaches: A History of the London and Brighton Road (1894) by William C. A. Blew
- The Brighton Road (1906) by Charles G. Harper (1863-1943)
- Centurions Handbook (2011)
- Surrey Walking Club results archive
