= Athletics at the 1956 Summer Olympics – Men's 50 kilometres walk =

Men's 50 kilometres walk at the Games of the XVI Olympiad
- Venue: Melbourne Cricket Ground
- Dates: November 24, 1956
- Competitors: 21 from 10 nations
- Winning time: 4:30:42.8

Medalists
1st place, gold medalist(s)		Norman Read; New Zealand
2nd place, silver medalist(s)		Yevgeniy Maskinskov; Soviet Union
3rd place, bronze medalist(s)		John Ljunggren; Sweden

Pathe Highlights

The men's 50 kilometres walk was an event at the 1956 Summer Olympics in Melbourne, Australia, on Saturday November 24, 1956. There were a total number of 21 participants from 10 nations.

== Final classification ==
RANK	NAME ATHLETE	TIME
	Norman Read (NZL)	4:30:42.8
	Yevgeny Maskinskov (URS)	4:32:57.0
	John Ljunggren (SWE)	4:35:02.0
4.	Abdon Pamich (ITA)	4:39:00.0
5.	Antal Róka (HUN)	4:50:09.0
6.	Ray Smith (AUS)	4:56:08.0
7.	Adolf Weinacker (USA)	5:00:16.0
8.	Albert Johnson (GBR)	5:02:19.0
9.	Eric Hall (GBR)	5:03:59.0
10.	Ion Barbu (ROU)	5:08:33.6
11.	Elliott Denman (USA)	5:12:14.0
12.	Leo Sjögren (USA)	5:12:34.0
13.	Ronald Crawford (AUS)	5:22:36.0
—	Milan Skřont (TCH)	DNF
—	Josef Dolezal (TCH)	DNF
—	Grigory Klimov (URS)	DNF
—	János Somogyi (HUN)	DNF
—	Dumitru Parachivescu (ROU)	DNF
—	Don Thompson (GBR)	DNF
—	Ted Allsopp (AUS)	DSQ
—	Mikhail Lavrov (URS)	DSQ
—	René Charrière (SUI)	DNS
—	Gilbert Marquis (SUI)	DNS
