= 1958 European Athletics Championships – Men's 50 kilometres walk =

Men's 50 kilometres walk at the European Athletics Championships

The men's 50 kilometres race walk at the 1958 European Athletics Championships was held in Stockholm, Sweden, on 22 August 1958.

== Medalists ==
Gold	Yevgeniy Maskinskov; Soviet Union
Silver	Abdon Pamich; Italy
Bronze	Max Weber; East Germany

== Results ==
=== Final ===
22 August

Rank	Name	Nationality	Time	Notes
1st place, gold medalist(s)	Yevgeniy Maskinskov	Soviet Union	4:17:15.4	CR
2nd place, silver medalist(s)	Abdon Pamich	Italy	4:18:00.0	
3rd place, bronze medalist(s)	Max Weber	East Germany	4:19:58.6	
4	Tom Misson	Great Britain	4:20:31.8	
5	Donald Thompson	Great Britain	4:25:09.0	
6	Mikhail Korshunov	Soviet Union	4:26:02.0	
7	Ladislav Moc	Czechoslovakia	4:27:16.6	
8	Louis Marquis	Switzerland	4:33:11.0	
9	John Ljunggren	Sweden	4:42:40.8	
10	Oddvar Sandvik	Norway	4:59:04.2	
11	André Dufresne	France	5:19:55.6	
	Giuseppe Dordoni	Italy	DNF	
	Åke Söderlund	Sweden	DNF	
	Claus Biethan	West Germany	DQ	

== Participation ==
According to an unofficial count, 14 athletes from 10 countries participated in the event.

- Czechoslovakia (1)
- East Germany (1)
- France (1)
- Italy (2)
- Norway (1)
- Soviet Union (2)
- Sweden (2)
- Switzerland (1)
- Great Britain (2)
- West Germany (1)
