= Athletics at the 1960 Summer Olympics – Men's 50 kilometres walk =

Men's 50 kilometres walk at the Games of the XVII Olympiad
- Venue: Olympic Stadium
- Dates: September 7, 1960
- Competitors: 39 from 20 nations
- Winning time: 4:25:30.0 OR

Medalists
1st place, gold medalist(s)		Don Thompson; Great Britain
2nd place, silver medalist(s)		John Ljunggren; Sweden
3rd place, bronze medalist(s)		Abdon Pamich; Italy

The men's 50 kilometres walk race walk event at the 1960 Olympic Games took place on September 7. The event was held in a final only format.

== Results ==
=== Final ===
Rank	Name	Nationality	Time	Notes
1st place, gold medalist(s)	Don Thompson	Great Britain	4:25:30.0	OR
2nd place, silver medalist(s)	John Ljunggren	Sweden	4:25:47.0	
3rd place, bronze medalist(s)	Abdon Pamich	Italy	4:27:55.4	
4	Oleksandr Shcherbyna	Soviet Union	4:31:44.0	
5	Tom Misson	Great Britain	4:33:03.0	
6	Alex Oakley	Canada	4:33:08.6	
7	Pino Dordoni	Italy	4:33:27.2	
8	Zora Singh	India	4:37:44.6	
9	Anatoly Vedyakov	Soviet Union	4:39:57.6	
10	Antonio De Gaetano	Italy	4:41:01.6	
11	Ladislav Moc	Czechoslovakia	4:42:33.6	
12	George Hazle	South Africa	4:43:18.8	
13	Max Weber	United Team of Germany	4:44:47.0	
14	Svätopluk Sýkora	Czechoslovakia	4:46:14.6	
15	Ajit Singh	India	4: 47:28.4	
16	Horst Astroth	United Team of Germany	4:50:57.0	
17	Josef Doležal	Czechoslovakia	4:51:18.6	
18	José Ribas	Spain	4:51:20.0	
19	Ron Laird	United States	4:53:21.6	
20	Frank O'Reilly	Ireland	4:54:40.0	
21	Charles Sowa	Luxembourg	4:57:00.4	
22	Louis Marquis	Switzerland	5:00:13.0	
23	Bruce MacDonald	United States	5:00:47.6	
24	John Allen	United States	5:03:15.2	
25	Alfred Leiser	Switzerland	5:06:55.0	
26	Mohamed Ben Lazhar	Tunisia	5:07:57.4	
27	René Charrière	Switzerland	5:09:00.8	
28	Jacques Arnoux	France	5:10:22.0	
	Albert Johnson	Great Britain	DQ	
	Grigory Klimov	Soviet Union	DQ	
	Guillermo Weller	Argentina	DQ	
	Kurt Sakowski	United Team of Germany	DQ	
	Noel Freeman	Australia	DQ	
	Ronald Crawford	Australia	DQ	
	Erik Söderlund	Sweden	DNF	
	Åke Söderlund	Sweden	DNF	
	Norman Read	New Zealand	DNF	
	Naoui Zlassi	Tunisia	DNF	
	Béla Dinesz	Hungary	DNF	
	Ștefan Bădulescu	Romania	DNS	
	Khalifa Bahrouni	Tunisia	DNS	
