= Athletics at the 1966 British Empire and Commonwealth Games – Men's 20 miles walk =

Men's 20 miles walk at the 1966 British Empire and Commonwealth Games
- Venue: Kingston
- Dates: August 5, 1966

Medalists
gold medal	Ron Wallwork	England
silver medal	Ray Middleton	England
bronze medal	Norman Read	New Zealand

The men's 20 miles walk event at the 1966 British Empire and Commonwealth Games was held on 5 August in Kingston, Jamaica. It was the first time that racewalking was held at the Games.

== Results ==
Results
Rank	Name	Nationality	Time	Notes
1st place, gold medalist(s)	Ron Wallwork	England	2:44:43	
2nd place, silver medalist(s)	Ray Middleton	England	2:45:19	
3rd place, bronze medalist(s)	Norman Read	New Zealand	2:46:29	
4	Don Thompson	England	2:46:43	
5	Alexander Oakley	Canada	2:54:26	
6	Felix Cappella	Canada	2:57:22	
7	Phillip Bannan	Isle of Man	3:06:12	
8	Albert Johnson	Isle of Man	3:08:06	
9	Roy Hart	Wales	3:15:03	
10	Libert Valentine	Trinidad and Tobago	3:22:26	
	Frank Clark	Australia	DNF	
	Richard Gawne	Isle of Man	DNF	
