= Roy Hart =

Roy Hart may refer to:

- Roy Hart (English footballer) (1933–2014)
- Roy Hart (gridiron football) (born 1965), American football player
- Roy Hart (performer) (1926–1975), South African actor and vocalist
- Roy Hart (race walker) (1936–?), Welsh race walker
- Royalton-Hartland Central School District, nicknamed Roy Hart, in Middleport, New York, United States

== See also ==
- Cyril Roy Hart (born 1923), English historian of Anglo-Saxon England
