= 1958 Italian Athletics Championships =

Edition of the Italian Athletics Championships

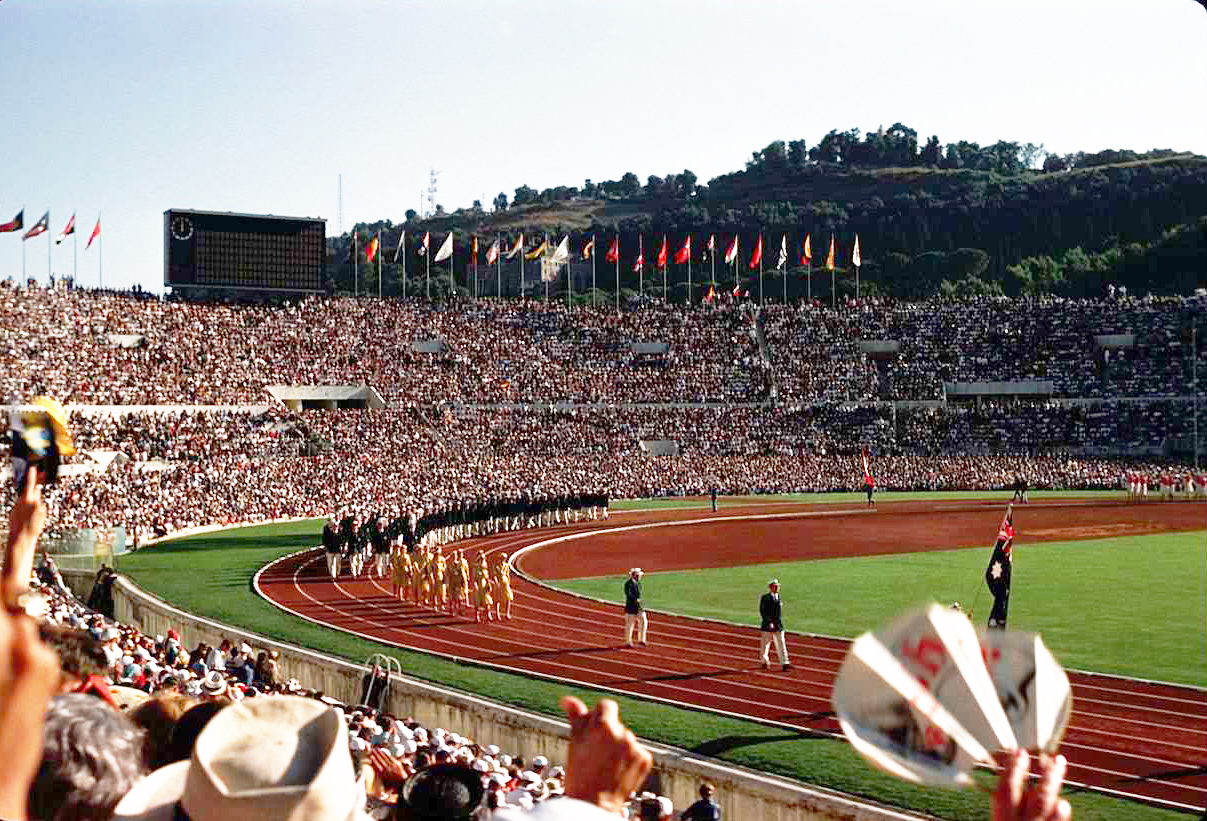
- Olympic Stadium during the Rome 1960 opening day two year after this event
- Dates: 12–14 September
- Host city: Rome
- Venue: Olympic Stadium
- Level: Senior
- Events: 37 (25 men, 12 women)

The 1958 Italian Athletics Championships was the 48th edition of the Italian Athletics Championships and was held in Rome (main event) from 12 to 14 September.

== Champions ==
Full results.

Track events
Event	Men	Performance	Women	Performance
100 m	Livio Berruti	10.4	Giusy Leone	11.5
200 m	Livio Berruti	21.4	Giusy Leone	24.5
400 m	Mario Fraschini	47.9	Delma Savorelli	58.9
800 m	Gianfranco Baraldi	1:52.0	Gilda Jannacone	2:15.3
1500 m	Gianfranco Baraldi	3:46.0		
5000 m	Antonio Ambu	14:30.2		
10,000 m	Antonio Ambu	30.43.8		
110/80 m hs	Giorgio Mazza	14.3	Letizia Bertoni	11.2
400 m hs	Salvatore Morale	52.5		
3000 m st	Alfredo Rizzo	9:15.6		
10,000 m walk	Abdon Pamich	46:02:0		
Field events
High jump	Gianpiero Cordovani	1.97 m	Osvalda Giardi	1.57 m
Pole vault	Edmondo Ballotta	4.20 m		
Long jump	Attilio Bravi	7.48 m	Piera Fassio	5.42 m
Triple jump	Enzo Cavalli	15.19 m		
Shot put	Silvano Meconi	16.75 m	Caterina Bedini	11.62 m
Discus throw	Adolfo Consolini	52.39 m	Elivia Ricci	46.16 m
Hammer throw	Avio Lucioli	57.73 m		
Javelin throw	Giovanni Lievore	74.94 m	Ada Turci	41.02 m
Combined
Decathlon/Pentathlon	Franco Sar	5835 pts	Franca Peggion	3955 pts
Road events
Half marathon (20 km)	Silvio De Florentis	1:05:58.0		
Marathon	Francesco Perrone	2:32:31.0		
20 km walk	Abdon Pamich	1:38:17.3		
50 km walk	Abdon Pamich	4:30:38.6		
Cross country
Cross (7.2 km/1.2 km)	Gianfranco Baraldi	23:28.2	Gilda Jannacone	4:03.5
