= Milan Skřont =

Czech racewalker

Personal information
- Nationality: Czech
- Born: 24 November 1930 Opava, Czechoslovakia
- Died: 15 April 1994 (aged 63) Vienna

Sport
- Sport: Athletics
- Event: Racewalking

Milan Skřont (24 November 1930 – 15 April 1994) was a Czech racewalker. He competed in the men's 50 kilometres walk at the 1956 Summer Olympics.
