= János Somogyi =

Hungarian racewalker

Personal information
- Nationality: Hungarian
- Born: 21 January 1922
- Died: 31 January 1998 (aged 76)

Sport
- Sport: Athletics
- Event: Racewalking

János Somogyi (21 January 1922 – 31 January 1998) was a Hungarian racewalker. He competed in the men's 50 kilometres walk at the 1956 Summer Olympics.
