= Ray Smith (race walker) =

Australian racewalker

Personal information
- Full name: Raymond Charles Smith
- Nationality: Australian
- Born: 12 August 1929
- Died: 4 June 2010 (aged 80)

Sport
- Sport: Athletics
- Event: Racewalking

Raymond Charles Smith (12 August 1929 – 4 June 2010) was an Australian racewalker. He competed in the men's 50 kilometres walk at the 1956 Summer Olympics.
