= Elliott Denman =

American racewalker

Personal information
- Nationality: American
- Born: January 23, 1934 (age 92)

Sport
- Sport: Athletics
- Event: Racewalking

Elliott Denman (born January 23, 1934) is an American racewalker. He competed in the men's 50 kilometres walk at the 1956 Summer Olympics.

At the 1961 Maccabiah Games in Israel, he won the 3,000 m racewalk.
