= Centurion (racewalking) =

The Brotherhood of Centurions is a club for which racewalkers are eligible who have completed a distance of 100 international miles (160.9 km) in Britain within 24 hours. Its name derives from a popular title from those competitors achieving the feat in the 19th century British long-distance walking sport, called Pedestrianism.

Pedestrianism was to be a popular spectator sport during the 18th and 19th centuries, as equestrianism still is, and bicycle racing became afterwards. Among the most famous professional pedestrians of that time was Robert Barclay Allardice, who completed one mile (1.6 km) in each of 1000 sequential hours.

In 1911, the Centurion title was set up as an award for amateur racewalkers. The first number was awarded to James Edwin Fowler-Dixon for a performance in London in 1877, and who was also elected the first president. Each successful Centurion earns the next number in sequence. That number belonging to the recipient in perpetuity. Since 1902, 100 mile (160.9 km) racewalks have been performed on a regular basis, with 94 held as of 2017. Centurion qualifying races are held annually in the United Kingdom, including the Isle of Man. In addition to the British Centurions, Centurion clubs with their own qualifying races exist in the Netherlands, the United States, Australia, New Zealand, and South Africa. Each club worldwide holds the same high standard. Members must walk a distance of 100 miles (160.9 km) within 24 hours.

The most successful competitor in Centurion is Sandra Brown with 25 wins of the category for ladies. Some Centurions known primarily for their achievements in other distances are Brian Adams, William Brown, John Kelly, Daniel and Dominic King, Yiannis Kouros, Shaul Ladany, Paul Nihill, Frank O'Reilly, Ian Richards, Don Thompson, and Rex Whitlock.

A newsletter is published by Australian Centurion Tim Erickson.

== Centurion Members of each Club ==
- Members list of British Centurions
- Members list of Continental Centurions
- Members list of United States Centurions
- Members list of Australian Centurions
- Members list of New Zealand Centurions
- Members list of African Centurions
- Members list of Malaysian Centurions

These Centurion Members are affiliated with Multiple Clubs

- Multiple Centurion List

== World Centurion Clubs ==
- British Centurions Website
- Continental Centurions Website Centurion Vereniging Nederland
- Members list of United States Centurions
- Australian Centurions Website
- New Zealand Centurions Website
- African Centurion Website
