= José Ribas (race walker) =

Spanish racewalker (1928–2017)

Personal information
- Nationality: Spanish
- Born: 19 March 1928 Barcelona, Spain
- Died: 19 September 2017 (aged 89) Buenos Aires, Argentina

Sport
- Sport: Athletics
- Event: Racewalking

José Ribas Juan (19 March 1928 – 19 June 2017) was a Spanish racewalker. He competed in the men's 50 kilometres walk at the 1960 Summer Olympics. Ribas died in Buenos Aires on 19 June 2017, at the age of 89.
