= Zora Singh =

Indian racewalker

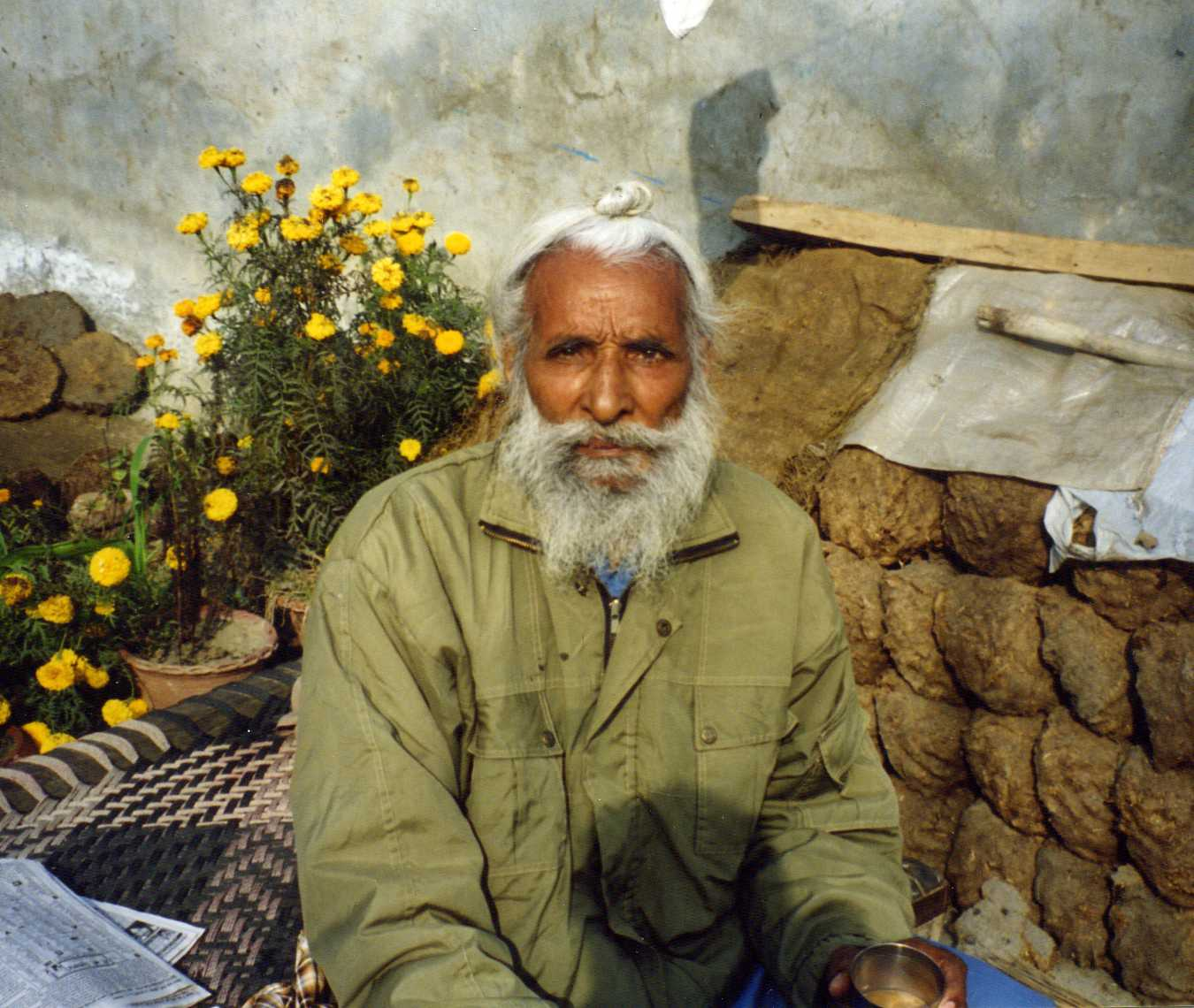

Personal information
- Nationality: Indian
- Born: June 6, 1928
- Died: 9 October 2005 (aged 77)

Sport
- Country: India
- Sport: Athletics
- Event: Racewalking

Zora Singh (June 6, 1928 - October 9, 2005) was an Indian athlete. He rose to the rank of Subedar in the Indian Army, a Bengal Sapper and a veteran of legendary 234 Engineer Regiment. He represented India in the 1960 Rome Olympic games and got 8th position in the 50km walk event.
