= Avio Lucioli =

Italian hammer thrower (1928–2021)

Personal information
- Nationality: Italian
- Born: 1 September 1928 Florence, Italy
- Died: 23 December 2021 (aged 93) Campi Bisenzio, Italy

Sport
- Country: Italy
- Sport: Athletics
- Event: Hammer throw
- Club: Fiat Torino

Avio Lucioli (1 September 1928 – 23 December 2021) was an Italian hammer thrower who competed at the 1952 Summer Olympics, Lucioli died in Campi Bisenzio on 23 December 2021, at the age of 93.
