= Frank O'Reilly =

Irish racewalker

Personal information
- Nationality: Irish
- Born: 7 April 1924
- Died: 20 March 2001 (aged 76)

Sport
- Sport: Athletics
- Event: Racewalking

Frank O'Reilly (7 April 1924 – 20 March 2001) was an Irish racewalker. He competed in the men's 50 kilometres walk at the 1960 Summer Olympics.
