= Yevgeny Maskinskov =

Soviet racewalker

Medal record

Men's athletics

Representing Soviet Union

Olympic Games
Silver medal – second place	1956 Melbourne	50 km walk

European Championships
Gold medal – first place	1958 Stockholm	50 km walk

Yevgeny Ivanovich Maskinskov (Russian: Евгений Иванович Маскинсков; 19 December 1930 – 25 January 1985) was a Soviet athlete who competed mainly in the 50 kilometre walk. He trained at the Armed Forces sports society in Saransk.

He competed for the Soviet Union in the 1956 Summer Olympics held in Melbourne, Australia in the 50 kilometre walk where he won the silver medal.
