= Horst Astroth =

German track and field athlete

Horst Astroth (30 October 1923 – 10 January 2017) was a German track and field athlete who competed at the 1960 Summer Olympics, where he finished 16th out of 39 participants in the men's 50 kilometres walk. At the Games he represented SV Halle. Born in Naumburg, Astroth began his sporting career as a gymnast and was injured in combat during World War II. Following the conflict he worked as a teacher and took up running in 1953 at the age of 30. Over the course of his career he set seven senior East German records and was national runner-up in the 50 km in 1956, 1958, and 1959. He was also eighth in that event at the 1962 European Athletics Championships. After retiring from international competition, he continued to compete and set records at master's-level events, while also working as a trainer with Naumburg BSG and a freelancer writer for the local Liberal Democratic newspaper. He died in January 2017 at the age of 93.
