= Thomas Hammond (athlete) =

English athlete (1878–1945)

Thomas Edgar Hammond

Personal information
- Nationality: British
- Born: 18 June 1878 Hitcham, Suffolk, England
- Died: 18 December 1945 (aged 67) Haywards Heath, West Sussex, England

Sport
- Sport: Track and field
- Event: Athletics at the 1908 Summer Olympics – Men's 10 miles walk
- Club: Surrey Walking Club

Thomas Edgar Hammond (18 June 1878 – 18 December 1945) was a British track and field athlete who competed in the 1908 Summer Olympics. He was a founder member of the Brotherhood of Centurions (Centurion no.10) and is remembered primarily for his prowess as a long-distance race walker.

== Life ==
Hammond was born on 18 June 1878 in Hitcham, Suffolk. He was educated at Bedford Modern School, and after school became a stockbroker at the London Stock Exchange.

In 1899, Hammond signed up for service in the Boer War, becoming cyclist orderly to Lord Kitchener. After war service, he returned to stockbroking. In 1903, he came third in the Stock Exchange London-to-Brighton Walk. In 1904 he won the event in 8 hours, 26 minutes, 57 seconds which was then a record. In 1904 he joined the Surrey Walking Club, eventually becoming its president, and also became a member of the Southern Counties Road Walking Association Committee.

Prior to his appearance in the Olympics, Hammond set a number of records, including London-to-Oxford (1907), London-to-Brighton and back (1907), and London-to-Brighton (1909).

Hammond represented Great Britain at the 1908 Summer Olympics in London, where, he took part in the 10-mile walk event. In September 1908, he set a number of British records, including the 24-hour when he covered 131 miles, 580 yards; his record stood at the time of his death in 1945. His time at 100 miles was 18-04:10.2. In 1914 he set the record for Norwich-to-Ipswich.

Hammond signed up for war service during World War I. He held the post of D.A.D.O.S. in Northern Persia and left the army in 1920 with the rank of Major.

In 1938, he was made President of the Old Bedford Modernians' Club. Hammond died in Haywards Heath, West Sussex on 18 December 1945.
