= Max Weber (race walker) =

East German racewalker

Personal information
- Born: 24 January 1922
- Died: 29 August 2007
Medal record
Men's athletics
Representing East Germany
European Championships
Bronze medal – third place	1958 Stockholm	50 km walk

Max Weber (24 January 1922 – 29 August 2007) was an East German race walker.

Weber won the bronze medal in the 50 km walk at the 1958 European Championships in Stockholm. He represented Germany at the 1960 Olympics in Rome, finishing 13th in the same event.
