= Alfred Leiser =

Swiss racewalker

Personal information
- Nationality: Swiss
- Born: 6 March 1929 (age 97) Zürich, Switzerland

Sport
- Sport: Athletics
- Event: Racewalking

Alfred Leiser (born 6 March 1929) is a Swiss racewalker. He competed in the men's 50 kilometres walk at the 1960 Summer Olympics.
