= Sandra Brown (ultradistance athlete) =

British ultra distance walker / runner

Personal information
- Nationality: British
- Born: 1 April 1949 (age 77)
- Years active: 1982–
- Height: 5 ft (152 cm) 6"
- Weight: 8 st (50 kg)

Sport
- Sport: Athletics
- Events: Ultra Distance walking Ultra distance running Racewalking
- Club: Surrey Walking Club
- Updated on 9 March 2018

Sandra Brown (born 1 April 1949) is a British ultra-distance walker and runner who holds a number of world records in long-distance walking.

== Career ==
Brown participated in many sporting activities during her childhood and completed her first formal marathon in 1982 in Winchester at age 33. That same year she entered her first ultramarathon, the 100km Surrey Summits, in April and a Long Distance Walkers Association (LDWA) cross-country 100 mile event with a 48 hour time limit in the annual English Centurions 24 Hour race. She has walked 33 "hundreds" between 1982 and 2019.

In 1989, Brown completed the first of four Paris-Colmar walks, a distance of 221km between the two French cities.

In 1995, Brown walked from the length of Great Britain, known as Land's End to John o' Groats, a distance of 830 miles. Her time of 13 days 10 hours beat the current running record and held until it was beaten in 2006 by Sharon Gaytor, who ran the distance in 12 days 16 hours.

In Nanango, Queensland, Australia in 1996, Brown set the Women's World running records for 1000km (8 days 12 hours 16 mins 20 secs) and 1,000 miles (14 days 10 hours 27 mins 20 secs). And, as with her Land's End to John O'Groats record, she did it walking nearly the whole way. These performances are still the second- and third-ranking of all time behind Eleanor Robinson's.

In recent years, Brown has set a number of W70 and W75 walk world bests for distances from 100km to 6 Days.

Brown has represented England and Great Britain on a number of occasions in ultra distance championships including the 2007 IAU 24 Hour Championship in Canada and the inaugural Commonwealth 24 Hour Run Championship in 2009 in England.

== Records ==
Brown holds the official World Walking Records (track) for the 100km, 100 miles, 12 hours and 24 hours.

Distance/Time	Performance	Place	Date
100km	11:17:42	Étréchy (FR)	27-28/10/1990
100 miles	19:00:47	Auckland (NZ)	10-11/07/1999
12 hours	106.180km	Étréchy (FR)	27-28/10/1990
24 hours	194.758km	Ware (GB)	19-20/07/1997

== Centurion Badges ==
Brown is the only person in the world to be awarded all 7 Centurion (racewalking) medals (English, Continental, Australian, New Zealand, American, Malaysian, and African).

== Biography and autobiographies ==
- The Winning Experience: Winning in Sport, in Business, in Life By Richard Brown, 1996, ISBN 9780952743712
- Long At The Top: Richard and Sandra Brown 1982–1993 By Dudley Harris, 1994, self-published (New Zealand)
- Bluestocking in Black Tights By Dudley Harris, 2000, self-published (New Zealand)
