= Tom Misson =

British racewalker

Personal information
- Full name: Thomas William Misson
- Nationality: British
- Born: 11 May 1930
- Died: 31 July 2017 (aged 87)

Sport
- Sport: Athletics
- Event: Racewalking

Thomas William Misson (11 May 1930 – 31 July 2017) was a British racewalker. He competed in the men's 50 kilometres walk at the 1960 Summer Olympics.
