= Roy Hart (race walker) =

Welsh athlete

Personal information
- Nationality: British (Welsh)
- Born: 20 January 1936
- Died: unknown

Sport
- Sport: Athletics
- Event: Race walking
- Club: Roath Labour Walking Club, Cardiff; Royal Air Force

Roy Alfred Hart (20 January 1936 – date of death unknown) was a track and field athlete from Wales, who specialised in race-walking and competed at the 1966 British Empire and Commonwealth Games (now Commonwealth Games).

== Biography ==
Hart was a member of the Roath Labour Walking Club in Cardiff and led his club to the 1964 Welsh and Open team wards, in addition to winning the Welsh ten miles championship title. He also held the 7 mile Welsh record.

He represented Glamorgan at county level and served as a physical instructor with the Royal Air Force and was also part of their athletics team based at St Athan. He finished third behind Paul Nihill in the 7 miles walk at the 1966 AAA Championships.

He represented the 1966 Welsh team at the 1966 British Empire and Commonwealth Games in Kingston, Jamaica, participating in one event; the 20 miles walk.

His date of death is unknown but he is known to have died before 2014.
