= Erwin Stütz =

Swiss racewalker

Personal information
- Nationality: Swiss
- Born: 8 August 1936 (age 89)

Sport
- Sport: Athletics
- Event: Racewalking

Erwin Stütz (born 8 August 1936) is a Swiss racewalker. He competed in the men's 50 kilometres walk at the 1964 Summer Olympics and the 1968 Summer Olympics.
