= Vilve Maremäe =

Estonian athletics competitor (1938–2019)

Vilve Maremäe (since 1971 Vilve Nummert; 30 January 1938 – 27 July 2019) was an Estonian athletics competitor.

She was born in Uue-Põltsamaa Rural Municipality, Viljandi County. In 1961 she graduated from the University of Tartu with a degree in chemistry.

She began athletics training at Tartu Pioneers' House, coached by Ernst Pertel. Later her coaches were Vilma Jürisma, Helver Unger and Fred Kudu. She won gold medal in the 1957 World Festival of Youth and Students in pentathlon. She was 26-time Estonian champion in different athletics disciplines. She was a member of the Estonian national athletics team.

Personal best:

- 100 m: 12.1 s (1957)
- 200 m: 25.5 s (1957)
- 80 m hurdles: 11.2 s (1964)
- long jump: 6.14 m (1960)
