= Jaroslav Jirásek =

Czech sprinter

Personal information
- Nationality: Czech
- Born: 6 June 1932
- Died: 2 June 2012 (aged 79)

Sport
- Sport: Sprinting
- Event: 4 × 400 metres relay

Jaroslav Jirásek (6 June 1932 – 2 June 2012) was a Czech sprinter. He competed in the 4 × 400 metres relay at the 1956 Summer Olympics and the 1960 Summer Olympics.
