= Mikhail Lavrov (athlete) =

Soviet racewalker

Personal information
- Nationality: Soviet
- Born: 11 September 1927
- Died: 9 February 1997 (aged 69)

Sport
- Sport: Athletics
- Event: Racewalking

Mikhail Lavrov (11 September 1927 – 9 February 1997) was a Soviet racewalker. He competed in the men's 50 kilometres walk at the 1956 Summer Olympics.
