= Anatoly Vedyakov =

Soviet racewalker

Personal information
- Full name: Anatoly Vedyakov
- Nationality: Soviet
- Born: 21 December 1930 Moscow, USSR
- Died: 5 April 2009 (aged 78)

Sport
- Sport: Athletics
- Event: Racewalking

Anatoly Stepanovich Vedyakov (21 December 1930 – 5 April 2009) was a Soviet racewalker. He competed in the men's 20 kilometres walk and men's 50 kilometres walk at the 1960 Summer Olympics in Rome and in the men's 50 kilometres walk at the 1964 Summer Olympics in Tokyo.
