= Norman Read =

New Zealand racewalker (1931–1994)

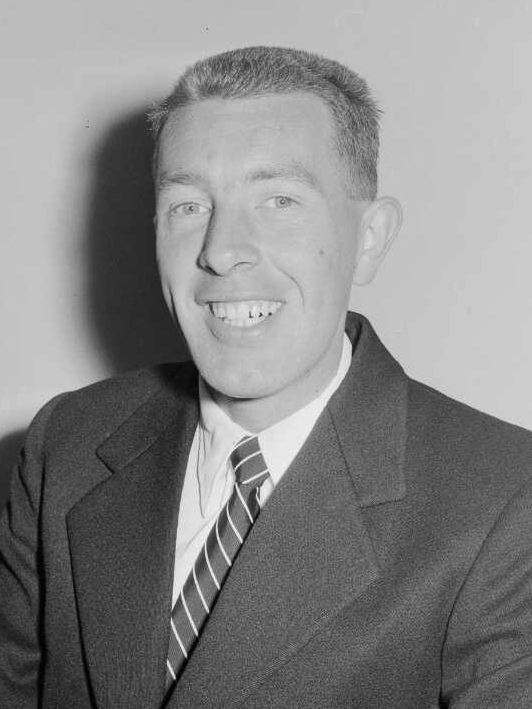
- Read in 1956

Personal information
- Born: 13 August 1931 Portsmouth, England
- Died: 22 May 1994 (aged 62) Pirongia, New Zealand
- Height: 178 cm (5 ft 10 in)
- Weight: 64 kg (141 lb)

Sport
- Sport: Athletics
- Event: Race walking

Achievements and titles
- Personal bests: 20 km – 1:33:54 (1961); 50 km –
Medal record
Representing New Zealand
Olympic Games
Gold medal – first place	1956 Melbourne	50 km walk
Commonwealth Games
Bronze medal – third place	1966 Kingston	20 mile walk

Norman Richard Read (13 August 1931 – 22 May 1994) was a New Zealand racewalker. Born in Portsmouth, England, Read emigrated to New Zealand in 1953. The self-proclaimed "Pommie-Kiwi" competed for New Zealand at the 1956 Olympics in the 50 km walk where he won the gold medal. For this achievement he was voted New Zealand’s Sportsman of the Year. Read also took part in the 1960 Summer Olympics in Rome, finishing fifth in the 20 km walk and abandoning the 50 km race. He won a bronze medal in the 20 mile walk at the 1966 British Empire and Commonwealth Games in Kingston, Jamaica, which was his last international tournament.

Read continued competing domestically for another 18 years, retiring at the age 52. He won 18 national titles, placing second thrice and third four times.

On 29 August 1968 Read married Megan Ann Crafar in Whangārei; they had three daughters and a son. After moving to New Plymouth, he founded New Zealand’s first race walking club. At the 1992 Summer Olympics he became only the second New Zealand Olympic judge. He was awarded a diploma by the International Amateur Athletic Federation on its 75th anniversary in 1987, and in 1990 he was elected a foundation member of the New Zealand Sports Hall of Fame. Read was also one of the first three inductees into the Taranaki Sports Hall of Fame at the Taranaki Sports Awards in 2009.

Read died of a heart attack during a veteran's bike race in Pirongia.
