= Don Thompson (race walker) =

British racewalker

Don Thompson MBE
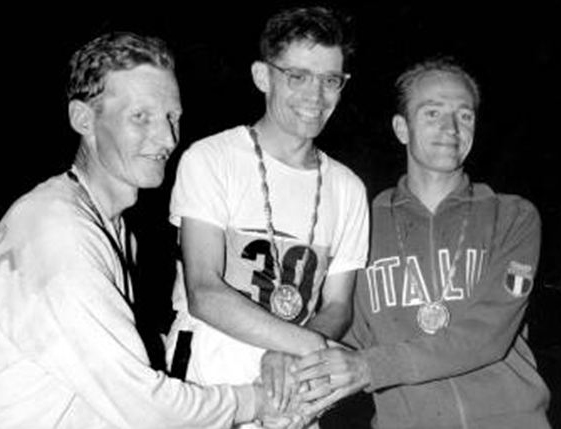
- John Ljunggren, Don Thompson and Abdon Pamich at the 1960 Olympics

Personal information
- Nationality: British (English)
- Born: 20 January 1933 Hillingdon, Middlesex, England
- Died: 3 October 2006 (aged 73) Frimley, Surrey, England
- Height: 1.68 m (5 ft 6 in)
- Weight: 55 kg (121 lb)

Sport
- Sport: Race walking
- Club: Metropolitan WC, London
Medal record
Men's athletics
Representing Great Britain
Olympic Games
Gold medal – first place	1960 Rome	50 km walk
European Championships
Bronze medal – third place	1962 Belgrade	50 km walk

Donald James Thompson MBE (20 January 1933 – 3 October 2006) was an English racewalker. He was the only British man to win a gold medal at the 1960 Summer Olympics, in the 50 km walk. He also won a bronze medal at the 1962 European Championships, also for the 50 km walk.

== Biography ==
Thompson was born in Hillingdon, London, and taught maths at Southland's comprehensive school, New Romney, from the mid-1970s. A small man, only 1.65m tall, he was originally a runner, but an injury to his Achilles' tendon forced him to take up race walking instead. He came second in the 52½ miles London to Brighton road race in 1954, and then won the event in each of the following eight years. He raced in the 50 km walk in the 1956 Summer Olympics in Melbourne, Australia, but withdrew dehydrated after 45 km while in fifth place.

He practised to compete at the Olympic Games in Rome in 1960 by exercising in a steam-filled bathroom at home, with the heating turned up and wearing a heavy tracksuit. After exercising for about half an hour, he would feel faint. At the time, he attributed his light-headedness to the effects of heat and humidity, but later realised that it was carbon monoxide fumes from the paraffin heater. His mother made him a hat like a képi to keep the sun off his head and neck during the race; together with his sunglasses, he was nicknamed "Il Topolino" (Italian: "Mickey Mouse", literally "little mouse"). In the 50 km race, staged at temperatures of up to 31 °C, the front two competitors were disqualified, and Thompson beat John Ljunggren of Sweden by 17 seconds to win the gold medal in 4 hours 25 minutes 30 seconds. The only other British competitor to win a gold medal at the 1960 Summer Olympics was Anita Lonsbrough, in the 200 m breaststroke. He was voted Sportsman of the Year in 1960 by the Sports Writers' Association.

He won a bronze medal at the European Championships in 1962, and was tenth at the 1964 Summer Olympics, both in the 50 km walk. He represented the England team at the 1966 British Empire and Commonwealth Games in Kingston, Jamaica, in the 20 miles walk event.

He continued racing for another 40 years, until the early 1990s and completing more than 150 marathons and a 100 mile racewalk in 1978. He habitually woke at 4am to run 13 km each morning. In 1983, he fell and broke his collarbone during a marathon walk in Thanet; undeterred, he completed the race before seeking treatment. He represented Britain in a race in France in 1991, aged 58 years and 89 days, becoming the oldest person to represent Britain in an international athletics event.

Outside athletics, he worked as an insurance clerk, a gardener and as a teacher (at Southland's School, New Romney). He was appointed a Member of the Most Excellent Order of the British Empire (MBE) in the 1970 New Year Honours for services to athletics. He collapsed at home and died at Frimley Park Hospital after suffering a brain aneurysm. He married in 1967, and was survived by his wife, and their son and daughter.
