= Rex Whitlock =

British racewalker

Personal information
- Full name: George Bernard Rex Whitlock
- Nationality: British
- Born: 8 September 1910 Hendon, England
- Died: 26 June 1982 (aged 71) Luton, England

Sport
- Sport: Athletics
- Event: Racewalking

George Bernard Rex Whitlock (8 September 1910 – 26 June 1982) was a British racewalker. He competed in the men's 50 kilometres walk at the 1948 Summer Olympics and the 1952 Summer Olympics.
