= Abdon Pamich =

Italian race walker (born 1933)

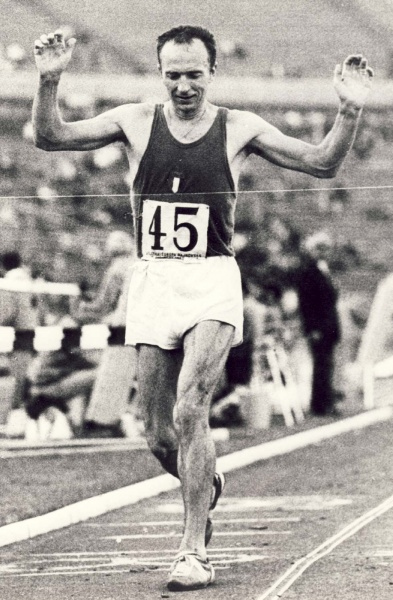
- Pamich competing in the 1960s

Personal information
- Nationality: Italian
- Born: 3 October 1933 (age 92) Fiume, Kingdom of Italy (now Rijeka, Croatia)
- Height: 1.84 m (6 ft 0 in)
- Weight: 72 kg (159 lb)

Sport
- Sport: Athletics
- Event: Race walking
- Club: Associazione Amatori Atletica; Esso Club Genova; Esso Roma

Achievements and titles
- Personal best(s): 20 km – 1:28:06 (1964); 50 km – 4:03:02 (1960)
Medal record
Men's athletics
Representing Italy
Olympic Games
Gold medal – first place	1964 Tokyo	50 km walk
Bronze medal – third place	1960 Rome	50 km walk
European Championships
Gold medal – first place	1962 Belgrade	50 km walk
Gold medal – first place	1966 Budapest	50 km walk
Silver medal – second place	1958 Stockholm	50 km walk
Mediterranean Games
Gold medal – first place	1955 Barcelona	50 km walk
Gold medal – first place	1963 Naples	50 km walk
Gold medal – first place	1971 Izmir	50 km walk
World Race Walking Cup
Gold medal – first place	1961 Lugano	50 km walk
Bronze medal – third place	1965 Pescara	50 km walk

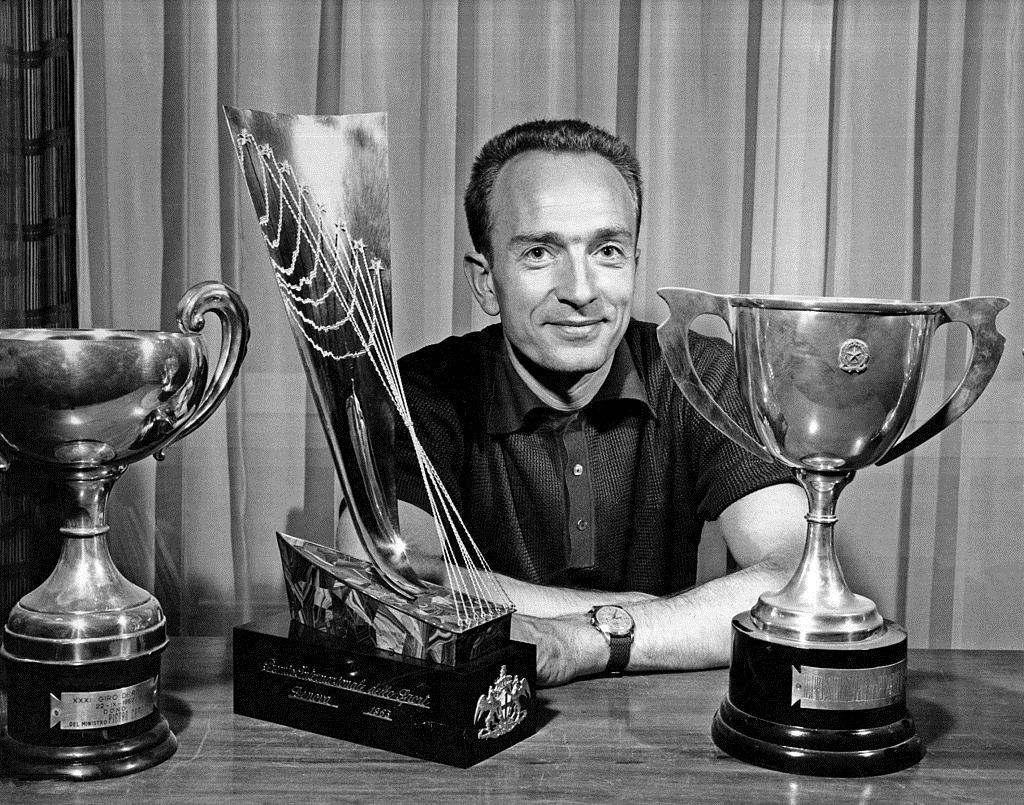
Pamich posing among some of his trophies. Genoa, May 1964.

Abdon Pamich (Italian pronunciation: [ˈabdom ˈpaːmitʃ]; born 3 October 1933) is a former Italian race walker.

== Early life ==
Pamich was born in Fiume (present-day Rijeka, Croatia) on 3 October 1933, when the city was under Italian jurisdiction. Together with his older brother, he left Rijeka for Italy on 24 September 1947, joining his father who had emigrated earlier and settling in Genoa.

== Career ==
Pamich competed in the race walking event at the 1956, 1960, 1964, 1968 and 1972 Olympics, winning a bronze medal in 1960 and a gold in 1964. Pamich was the Olympic flag bearer for Italy in 1972.

On 16 October 1960, Pamich set a world record over 50 km at 4:03:02 in Ponte San Pietro.

Pamich was European champion in 1962 and 1966 and gold at the Mediterranean Games in 1959, 1963 and 1971.

He was later inducted into the FIDAL Hall of Fame.

== Achievements ==
Olympic Games
Year	Venue	Position	Event	Time	Notes
1956	(Australia) Melbourne	11th	20 km	1:36:03	
1956	(Australia) Melbourne	4th	50 km	4:39:00	
1960	(Italy) Rome	3rd	50 km	4:27:55	
1964	(Japan) Tokyo	1st	50 km	4:11:12	OR
1968	Mexico City	DNF	50 km	DSQ	
1972	(West Germany) Munich	DNF	50 km	DSQ	

=== National titles ===
Pamich won 40 national championships:

- 13 in the 10 km walk (1956 and 12 times consecutively from 1958 to 1969)
- 13 in the 20 km walk (12 times consecutively from 1958 to 1969 and 1971)
- 14 in the 50 km walk (consecutively from 1955 to 1969)

== See also ==
- Walk of Fame of Italian sport
- List of athletes with the most appearances at Olympic Games
- Italian Athletics Championships – Multi winners

Summer Olympics
Preceded by Raimondo D'Inzeo	Flag bearer for Italy; 1972 Munich	Succeeded by Klaus Dibiasi
Records
Preceded by Anatoly Vedyakov	Men's 50 km Walk World Record Holder; 16 October 1960 – 17 August 1961	Succeeded by Grigory Klimov
