= Grigory Klimov =

Soviet racewalker

Personal information
- Nationality: Soviet
- Born: 10 April 1933 (age 92)

Sport
- Sport: Athletics
- Event: Racewalking

Grigory Klimov (born 10 April 1933) is a Soviet racewalker. He competed in the men's 50 kilometres walk at the 1956 Summer Olympics and the 1960 Summer Olympics.
