= 1973 IAAF World Race Walking Cup =

- Organisers: IAAF
- Edition: 6th
- Date: October 12–13
- Host city: Lugano, Ticino, Switzerland
- Events: 2
- Participation: 68 athletes from 9 nations

The 1973 IAAF World Race Walking Cup was held in Lugano, Switzerland, on October 12–13, 1973. The event was also known as Lugano Trophy.

Complete results were published.

== Medallists ==
Event	Gold		Silver		Bronze	
Men
20 km walk	Hans-Georg Reimann (GDR)	1:29:31	Karl-Heinz Stadtmüller (GDR)	1:29:36	Ron Laird (USA)	1:30:45
50 km walk	Bernd Kannenberg (FRG)	3:56:51	Otto Barch (URS)	3:57:11	Christoph Höhne (GDR)	3:57:26
Men (Team)
Team	East Germany	139 pts	Soviet Union	134 pts	Italy	104 pts

== Results ==
=== Men's 20 km ===
Place	Athlete	Nation	Time
1st place, gold medalist(s)	Hans-Georg Reimann	East Germany (GDR)	1:29:31
2nd place, silver medalist(s)	Karl-Heinz Stadtmüller	East Germany (GDR)	1:29:36
3rd place, bronze medalist(s)	Ron Laird	United States (USA)	1:30:45
4	Nikolay Smaga	Soviet Union (URS)	1:30:57
5	Yevgeniy Ivchenko	Soviet Union (URS)	1:31:33
6	Armando Zambaldo	Italy (ITA)	1:31:42
7	Todd Scully	United States (USA)	1:32:24
8	Roger Mills	Great Britain (GBR)	1:32:45
9	Pasquale Busca	Italy (ITA)	1:33:04
10	Peter Frenkel	East Germany (GDR)	1:33:23
11	Siegfried Richter	West Germany (FRG)	1:33:33
12	Vladimir Resayev	Soviet Union (URS)	1:33:47
13	Abdon Pamich	Italy (ITA)	1:33:56
14	Jerry Brown	United States (USA)	1:34:05
15	Siegfried Zschiegner	East Germany (GDR)	1:34:12
16	Roberto Buccione	Italy (ITA)	1:34:38
17	Feliks Sliwinski	Poland (POL)	1:34:45
18	John Warhurst	Great Britain (GBR)	1:34:58
19	Jan Ornoch	Poland (POL)	1:35:13
20	Amos Seddon	Great Britain (GBR)	1:35:17
21	Stefan Ingvarsson	Sweden (SWE)	1:35:52
22	Mieczysław Górski	Poland (POL)	1:36:04
23	Hans Tenggren	Sweden (SWE)	1:36:27
24	Roy Thorpe	Great Britain (GBR)	1:37:40
25	Jan Raszka	Poland (POL)	1:38:25
26	Manfred Kolvenbach	West Germany (FRG)	1:38:44
27	Nicholas John Stabile	United States (USA)	1:39:11
28	Marcel Jobin	Canada (CAN)	1:39:25
29	Helmut Stolte	West Germany (FRG)	1:39:36
30	Pat Farrelly	Canada (CAN)	1:40:52
31	Kåre Moen	Sweden (SWE)	1:41:44
32	Karl-Heinz Merschenz	Canada (CAN)	1:43:38
—	Heinz Mayr	West Germany (FRG)	DQ
—	Bo Gustafsson	Sweden (SWE)	DNF
—	Anatoliy Solomin	Soviet Union (URS)	DNF

=== Men's 50 km ===
Place	Athlete	Nation	Time
1st place, gold medalist(s)	Bernd Kannenberg	West Germany (FRG)	3:56:51
2nd place, silver medalist(s)	Otto Barch	Soviet Union (URS)	3:57:11
3rd place, bronze medalist(s)	Christoph Höhne	East Germany (GDR)	3:57:26
4	Veniamin Soldatenko	Soviet Union (URS)	4:01:34
5	Gerhard Weidner	West Germany (FRG)	4:01:59
6	Peter Selzer	East Germany (GDR)	4:02:11
7	Sergey Bondarenko	Soviet Union (URS)	4:07:52
8	Winfried Skotnicki	East Germany (GDR)	4:08:30
9	Vittorio Visini	Italy (ITA)	4:09:25
10	Vladimir Svechnikov	Soviet Union (URS)	4:11:22
11	Matthias Kroel	East Germany (GDR)	4:12:25
12	Shaun Lightman	Great Britain (GBR)	4:15:14
13	Heinrich Schubert	West Germany (FRG)	4:15:52
14	John Knifton	United States (USA)	4:17:49
15	Rosario Valore	Italy (ITA)	4:18:17
16	Domenico Carpentieri	Italy (ITA)	4:19:59
17	Leo Frey	West Germany (FRG)	4:20:30
18	Örjan Andersson	Sweden (SWE)	4:21:06
19	Ray Middleton	Great Britain (GBR)	4:22:25
20	Floyd Godwin	United States (USA)	4:23:49
21	Henryk Wypich	Poland (POL)	4:25:07
22	Franco Vecchio	Italy (ITA)	4:25:44
23	Bob Dobson	Great Britain (GBR)	4:27:32
24	William Weigle	United States (USA)	4:28:41
25	Bob Kitchen	United States (USA)	4:29:39
26	Stanisław Korneluk	Poland (POL)	4:32:28
27	Alex Oakley	Canada (CAN)	4:34:06
28	Max Sjöholm	Sweden (SWE)	4:34:47
29	Bo Fransson	Sweden (SWE)	4:36:12
30	Mike Holmes	Great Britain (GBR)	4:37:54
31	Stanisław Chwiej	Poland (POL)	4:39:06
32	Pat Farrelly	Canada (CAN)	4:40:55
33	Karl-Heinz Merschenz	Canada (CAN)	4:48:03
—	Marek Kaspryzk	Poland (POL)	DNF
—	Owe Hemmingsson	Sweden (SWE)	DNF

=== Team ===
The team rankings, named Lugano Trophy, combined the 20km and 50km events team results.

Place	Country	Points
1st place, gold medalist(s)	East Germany	139 pts
2nd place, silver medalist(s)	Soviet Union	134 pts
3rd place, bronze medalist(s)	Italy	104 pts
4	West Germany	95 pts
5	United States	95 pts
6	United Kingdom	81 pts
7	Poland	52 pts
8	Sweden	40 pts
9	Canada	18 pts

== Participation ==
The participation of 68 athletes from 9 countries is reported.

- Canada (4)
- East Germany (8)
- Italy (8)
- Poland (8)
- Soviet Union (8)
- Sweden (8)
- United Kingdom (8)
- United States (8)
- West Germany (8)

== Qualifying rounds ==
From 1961 to 1985 there were qualifying rounds with the first two winners proceeding to the final. This year, the German Democratic Republic, the Soviet Union, the Federal Republic of Germany, the United States, and Canada proceeded directly to the final.

Countries qualifying for the final are highlighted in green

=== Zone 1 ===
Borås, Sweden, September 8/9

Rank	Nation	Points
1	United Kingdom	97 pts
2	Sweden	84 pts
3	France	70 pts
4	Norway	34 pts
5	Denmark	31 pts
6	Ireland	28 pts

=== Zone 2 ===
Gradisca d'Isonzo, Italy, September 9

Rank	Nation	Points
1	Italy	104 pts
2	Poland	95 pts
3	Bulgaria	79 pts
4	Czechoslovakia	57 pts
5	Spain	56 pts
6	Hungary	48 pts
7	Switzerland	29 pts
