= Athletics at the 1972 Summer Olympics – Men's 20 kilometres walk =

Men's 20 kilometres walk at the Games of the XX Olympiad
- Venue: Olympic Stadium, Munich, West Germany
- Date: 31 August 1972
- Competitors: 24 from 12 nations
- Winning time: 1:26:42.4 OR

Medalists
1st place, gold medalist(s)		Peter Frenkel; East Germany
2nd place, silver medalist(s)		Volodymyr Holubnychy; Soviet Union
3rd place, bronze medalist(s)		Hans-Georg Reimann; East Germany

These are the official results of the Men's 20 kilometres walk event at the 1972 Summer Olympics in Munich. The competition was held on 31 August. There were no heats with this event, it was held as a finals only event.

== Results ==
Rank	Athlete	Nation	Time	Time behind	Notes
1st place, gold medalist(s)	Peter Frenkel	East Germany	1:26:42.4		OR
2nd place, silver medalist(s)	Volodymyr Holubnychy	Soviet Union	1:26:55.2		
3rd place, bronze medalist(s)	Hans-Georg Reimann	East Germany	1:27:16.6		
4	Gerhard Sperling	East Germany	1:27:55.0		
5	Nikolay Smaga	Soviet Union	1:28:16.6		
6	Paul Nihill	Great Britain	1:28:44.4		
7	Jan Ornoch	Poland	1:32:01.6		
8	Vittorio Visini	Italy	1:32:30.0		
9	José Oliveros	Mexico	1:32:40.6		
10	Larry Young	United States	1:32:53.4		
11	Jan Rolstad	Norway	1:33:03.2		
12	Pedro Aroche	Mexico	1:33:05.0		
13	Heinz Mayr	West Germany	1:33:13.8		
14	Phil Embleton	Great Britain	1:33:22.2		
15	Tom Dooley	United States	1:34:58.8		
16	Wilfried Wesch	West Germany	1:35:20.6		
17	Peter Marlow	Great Britain	1:35:38.8		
18	Charles Sowa	Luxembourg	1:36:23.8		
19	Goetz Klopfer	United States	1:38:33.6		
20	Hunde Toure	Ethiopia	1:43:11.6		
21	José Esteban Valle	Nicaragua	1:45:09.4		
22	Ismael Avila	Mexico	1:45:45.4		
—	Bernd Kannenberg	West Germany	DNF		
—	Yevgeniy Ivchenko	Soviet Union	DQ		
—	Tadeusz Gorzechowski	Poland	DNS		
—	Ludomir Nitkowski	Poland	DNS		
—	Shaul Ladany	Israel	DNS		
—	Teodor Ionescu	Romania	DNS		
—	Ioan Mureşanu	Romania	DNS		
—	Daniel Björkgren	Sweden	DNS		
—	Stefan Ingvarsson	Sweden	DNS		
—	Hans Tenggren	Sweden	DNS		
—	Fernando Ielli	Italy	DNS		
—	Oscar Barletta	Italy	DNS		
—	Kjell Georg Lund	Norway	DNS		
—	Aram Levonian	Bulgaria	DNS		
—	János Dalmati	Hungary	DNS		
—	Antal Kiss	Hungary	DNS		
