= 1974 European Athletics Championships – Men's 50 kilometres walk =

Men's 50 kilometres walk at the European Athletics Championships

The men's 50 kilometres race walk at the 1974 European Athletics Championships was held in Rome, Italy, on 7 September 1974.

== Medalists ==
Gold	Christoph Höhne; East Germany
Silver	Otto Barch; Soviet Union
Bronze	Peter Selzer; East Germany

== Results ==
=== Final ===
7 September

Rank	Name	Nationality	Time	Notes
1st place, gold medalist(s)	Christoph Höhne	East Germany	3:59:05.6	CR
2nd place, silver medalist(s)	Otto Barch	Soviet Union	4:02:38.8	
3rd place, bronze medalist(s)	Peter Selzer	East Germany	4:04:28.4	
4	Vittorio Visini	Italy	4:05:43.6	
5	Venyamin Soldatenko	Soviet Union	4:09:31.6	
6	Winfried Skotnicki	East Germany	4:10:19.0	
7	Gerhard Weidner	West Germany	4:10:52.4	
8	Heinrich Schubert	West Germany	4:16:05.0	
9	Bernhard Kannenberg	West Germany	4:21:47.8	
10	Domenico Carpentieri	Italy	4:22:42.6	
11	John Warhurst	Great Britain	4:26:34.6	
12	Rosario Valore	Italy	4:30:22.8	
13	Daniel Björkgren	Sweden	4:31:08.8	
14	Bob Dobson	Great Britain	4:35:26.4	
15	Stefan Ingvarsson	Sweden	4:36:18.2	
	Milan Bartos	Czechoslovakia	DNF	
	Yancho Kamenov	Bulgaria	DNF	
	Örjan Andersson	Sweden	DQ	
	Sergey Bondarenko	Soviet Union	DQ	

== Participation ==
According to an unofficial count, 19 athletes from 8 countries participated in the event.

- Bulgaria (1)
- Czechoslovakia (1)
- East Germany (3)
- Italy (3)
- Soviet Union (3)
- Sweden (3)
- Great Britain (2)
- West Germany (3)
