= Athletics at the 1968 Summer Olympics – Men's 20 kilometres walk =

Men's 20 kilometres walk at the Games of the XIX Olympiad
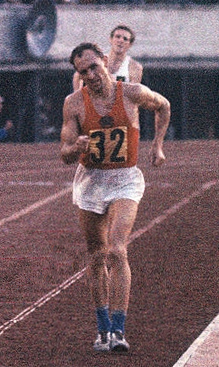
- Volodymyr Holubnychy 1964
- Venue: Estadio Olimpico Universitario
- Dates: October 14, 1968
- Competitors: 34 from 20 nations
- Winning time: 1:33:58.4

Medalists
1st place, gold medalist(s)		Volodymyr Holubnychy	Soviet Union
2nd place, silver medalist(s)		José Pedraza	Mexico
3rd place, bronze medalist(s)		Nikolay Smaga	Soviet Union

The men's 20 kilometres walk was the shorter of the two men's racewalking events on the Athletics at the 1968 Summer Olympics program in Mexico City. It was held on 14 October 1968. 34 athletes from 20 nations entered.

== Results ==
Rank	Athlete	Nation	Time	Time behind	Notes
1st place, gold medalist(s)	Volodymyr Holubnychy	Soviet Union	1:33:58.4		
2nd place, silver medalist(s)	José Pedraza	Mexico	1:34:00.0		
3rd place, bronze medalist(s)	Nikolay Smaga	Soviet Union	1:34:03.4		
4	Rudy Haluza	United States	1:35:00.2		
5	Gerhard Sperling	East Germany	1:35:27.2		
6	Otto Barch	Soviet Union	1:36:16.8		
7	Hans-Georg Reimann	East Germany	1:36:31.4		
8	Stefan Ingvarsson	Sweden	1:36:43.4		
9	Leonida Caraiosifoglu	Romania	1:37:07.6		
10	Peter Frenkel	East Germany	1:37:20.8		
11	Arthur Jones	Great Britain	1:37:32.0		
12	Pasquale Busca	Italy	1:37:32.0		
13	José Oliveros	Mexico	1:38:17		
14	Antal Kiss	Hungary	1:38:24		
15	Stig Lindberg	Sweden	1:40:03		
16	Frank Clark	Australia	1:40:06		
17	Tom Dooley	United States	1:40:08		
18	Karl-Heinz Merschenz	Canada	1:40:11		
19	Charles Sowa	Luxembourg	1:40:17		
20	Eladio Campos	Mexico	1:41:52		
21	Örjan Andersson	Sweden	1:41:58		
22	John Webb	Great Britain	1:42:51		
23	René Pfister	Switzerland	1:43:36		
24	Bob Hughes	Great Britain	1:43:50		
25	Ron Laird	United States	1:44:38		
26	Mieczysław Rutyna	Poland	1:47:29		
27	Euclides Calzado	Cuba	1:49:27		
28	Julio Ortíz	Guatemala	1:54:48		
29	Roberto Castellanos	El Salvador	1:58:48		
—	Julius Müller	West Germany	DSQ		
—	José Esteban Valle	Nicaragua	DNF		
—	Carlos Vanegas	Nicaragua	DNF		
—	Felix Cappella	Canada	DNF		
—	Kazuo Saito	Japan	DNF		
—	János Dalmati	Hungary	DNS		
