= 1971 European Athletics Championships – Men's 50 kilometres walk =

Men's 50 kilometres walk at the European Athletics Championships

The men's 50 kilometres race walk at the 1971 European Athletics Championships was held in Helsinki, Finland, on 14 August 1971.

== Medalists ==
Gold	Venyamin Soldatenko; Soviet Union
Silver	Christoph Höhne; East Germany
Bronze	Peter Selzer; East Germany

== Results ==
=== Final ===
14 August

Rank	Name	Nationality	Time	Notes
1st place, gold medalist(s)	Venyamin Soldatenko	Soviet Union	4:02:22.0	CR
2nd place, silver medalist(s)	Christoph Höhne	East Germany	4:04:45.2	
3rd place, bronze medalist(s)	Peter Selzer	East Germany	4:06:11.0	
4	Otto Barch	Soviet Union	4:09:14.4	
5	Winfried Skotnicki	East Germany	4:10:22.0	
6	Bernhard Nermerich	West Germany	4:11:44.0	
7	Igor Della Rossa	Soviet Union	4:12:08.6	
8	Abdon Pamich	Italy	4:14:36.2	
9	Stefan Ingvarsson	Sweden	4:14:56.0	
10	Charles Sowa	Luxembourg	4:15:59.0	
11	János Dalmati	Hungary	4:16:59.6	
12	Alexandr Bílek	Czechoslovakia	4:17:36.4	
13	Gerhard Weidner	West Germany	4:17:40.8	
14	Örjan Andersson	Sweden	4:20:04.8	
15	Vittorio Visini	Italy	4:20:45.8	
16	Bob Dobson	Great Britain	4:21:15.0	
17	Daniel Björkgren	Sweden	4:26:39.6	
18	Antal Kiss	Hungary	4:26:53.6	
19	Nesty Fischer	France	4:28:18.4	
20	Manfred Aeberhard	Switzerland	4:35:45.6	
21	Alfred Badel	Switzerland	4:43:12.0	
	Tore Brustad	Norway	DNF	
	Ron Wallwork	Great Britain	DNF	
	Herbert Meier	West Germany	DNF	
	Carl Lawton	Great Britain	DNF	

== Participation ==
According to an unofficial count, 25 athletes from 12 countries participated in the event.

- Czechoslovakia (1)
- East Germany (3)
- France (1)
- Hungary (2)
- Italy (2)
- Luxembourg (1)
- Norway (1)
- Soviet Union (3)
- Sweden (3)
- Switzerland (2)
- Great Britain (3)
- West Germany (3)
