= Athletics at the 1972 Summer Olympics – Men's 50 kilometres walk =

Men's 50 kilometres walk at the Games of the XX Olympiad
- Venue: Olympic Stadium, Munich, West Germany
- Date: 3 September 1972
- Competitors: 36 from 18 nations
- Winning time: 3:56:11.6 OR

Medalists
1st place, gold medalist(s)		Bernd Kannenberg; West Germany
2nd place, silver medalist(s)		Veniamin Soldatenko; Soviet Union
3rd place, bronze medalist(s)		Larry Young; United States

These are the official results of the Men's 50 kilometres walk event at the 1972 Summer Olympics in Munich, held on 3 September. This distance was not conducted in 1976, but returned in 1980. There were no heats with this event, it was held as a finals only event.

== Final ==
Rank	Name	Nationality	Time
1st place, gold medalist(s)	Bernd Kannenberg	West Germany	3:56:11.6
2nd place, silver medalist(s)	Veniamin Soldatenko	Soviet Union	3:58:24.0
3rd place, bronze medalist(s)	Larry Young	United States	4:00:46.0
4	Otto Barch	Soviet Union	4:01:35.4
5	Peter Selzer	East Germany	4:04:05.4
6	Gerhard Weidner	West Germany	4:06:26.0
7	Vittorio Visini	Italy	4:08:31.4
8	Gabriel Hernández	Mexico	4:12:09.0
9	Paul Nihill	Great Britain	4:14:09.4
10	Charles Sowa	Luxembourg	4:14:21.2
11	Karl-Heinz Stadtmüller	East Germany	4:14:28.8
12	Hans Tenggren	Sweden	4:16:37.6
13	Daniel Björkgren	Sweden	4:20:00.0
14	Christoph Höhne	East Germany	4:20:43.8
15	Stefan Ingvarsson	Sweden	4:21:01.0
16	Horst-Rüdiger Magnor	West Germany	4:21:53.4
17	William Weigle	United States	4:22:52.2
18	John Warhurst	Great Britain	4:23:21.6
19	Shaul Ladany	Israel	4:24:38.6
20	Raúl González	Mexico	4:26:13.4
21	Alex Oakley	Canada	4:28:42.6
22	János Dalmati	Hungary	4:32:23.2
23	Domenico Carpentieri	Italy	4:33:10.6
24	Kjell Georg Lund	Norway	4:34:23.4
25	Howard Timms	Great Britain	4:34:43.8
26	Antal Kiss	Hungary	4:34:45.0
27	Steve Hayden	United States	4:36:07.2
28	Adalberto Scorza	Argentina	4:42:41.4
29	Ole David Jensen	Denmark	4:57:13.8
-	Abdon Pamich	Italy	DQ
-	Sergey Grigoryev	Soviet Union	DQ
-	Alfred Badel	Switzerland	DNF
-	Jan Ornoch	Poland	DNF
-	Jean-Claude Decosse	France	DNF
-	José Oliveros	Mexico	DNF
-	Karl-Heinz Merschenz	Canada	DNF
-	Ion Benga	Romania	DNS
-	Andrzej Siennicki	Poland	DNS
-	Winicjusz Nowosielski	Poland	DNS
-	Vasile Dumitrescu	Romania	DNS
-	Yuri Penalba	Nicaragua	DNS
-	Ilia Popov	Bulgaria	DNS
