= 1969 European Athletics Championships – Men's 50 kilometres walk =

Athletics event

Men's 50 kilometres walk at the European Athletics Championships

The men's 50 kilometres race walk at the 1969 European Athletics Championships was held in Athens, Greece, on 18 September 1969.

== Medalists ==
Gold	Christoph Höhne; East Germany
Silver	Peter Selzer; East Germany
Bronze	Venyamin Soldatenko; Soviet Union

== Results ==
=== Final ===
18 September

Rank	Name	Nationality	Time	Notes
1st place, gold medalist(s)	Christoph Höhne	East Germany	4:12:32.8	CR
2nd place, silver medalist(s)	Peter Selzer	East Germany	4:16:09.6	
3rd place, bronze medalist(s)	Venyamin Soldatenko	Soviet Union	4:23:04.8	
4	Otto Barch	Soviet Union	4:25:45.8	
5	Ray Middleton	Great Britain	4:27:00.0	
6	Stefan Ingvarsson	Sweden	4:32:07.2	
7	Charles Sowa	Luxembourg	4:33:24.6	
8	Alexander Bílek	Czechoslovakia	4:34:25.8	
9	Henri Delerue	France	4:35:10.4	
10	János Dalmati	Hungary	4:38:09.0	
11	Edmund Paziewski	Poland	4:45:15.0	
12	Stig Lindberg	Sweden	4:45:53.4	
13	Robert Rinchard	Belgium	5:09:46.0	
14	Aynur Ayhan	Turkey	5:10:16.4	
	Abdon Pamich	Italy	DNF	
	Antal Kiss	Hungary	DNF	
	Vittorio Visini	Italy	DNF	
	Guy Bailly	France	DNF	
	Tore Brustad	Norway	DNF	
	Odd Landehagen	Norway	DNF	
	Bryan Elley	Great Britain	DNF	
	Shaun Lightman	Great Britain	DNF	
	Burkhard Leuschke	East Germany	DQ	
	Sergey Bondarenko	Soviet Union	DQ	
	Paavo Pohjolainen	Finland	DQ	

== Participation ==
According to an unofficial count, 25 athletes from 14 countries participated in the event.

- Belgium (1)
- Czechoslovakia (1)
- East Germany (3)
- Finland (1)
- France (2)
- Hungary (2)
- Italy (2)
- Luxembourg (1)
- Norway (2)
- Poland (1)
- Soviet Union (3)
- Sweden (2)
- Turkey (1)
- Great Britain (3)
