= Ole Jensen =

Ole Jensen may be:

- Ole Jensen (Norwegian sport shooter), competed in team rifle at the 1912 Summer Olympics
- Ole Hviid Jensen, Danish sport shooter at the 1956, 1964 and the 1968 Summer Olympics
- Ole David Jensen, Danish Olympic racewalker
- Ole Jensen (neuroscientist), Danish researcher
