= 1974 European Athletics Championships – Men's 20 kilometres walk =

Men's 20 kilometres walk at the European Athletics Championships

The men's 20 kilometres race walk at the 1974 European Athletics Championships was held in Rome, Italy, on 3 September 1974.

== Medalists ==
Gold	Vladimir Golubnichiy; Soviet Union
Silver	Bernhard Kannenberg; West Germany
Bronze	Roger Mills; Great Britain

== Results ==
=== Final ===
3 September

Rank	Name	Nationality	Time	Notes
1st place, gold medalist(s)	Vladimir Golubnichiy	Soviet Union	1:29:30.0	
2nd place, silver medalist(s)	Bernhard Kannenberg	West Germany	1:29:38.2	
3rd place, bronze medalist(s)	Roger Mills	Great Britain	1:32:33.8	
4	Armando Zambaldo	Italy	1:33:04.8	
5	Jan Ornoch	Poland	1:33:19.6	
6	Amos Seddon	Great Britain	1:34:17.6	
7	Sandro Bellucci	Italy	1:34:52.4	
8	Hans Tenggren	Sweden	1:35:47.0	
9	Vinko Galušić	Yugoslavia	1:36:32.2	
10	Owe Hemmingsson	Sweden	1:37:07.6	
11	Siegfried Zschiegner	East Germany	1:37:45.0	
12	Evgeni Semerdzhiev	Bulgaria	1:39:42.4	
13	Milan Vala	Czechoslovakia	1:39:50.8	
14	Jean-Claude Decosse	France	1:39:54.8	
15	Yevgeniy Ivchenko	Soviet Union	1:39:56.0	
	Gérard Lelièvre	France	DNF	
	Peter Frenkel	East Germany	DNF	
	Vittorio Visini	Italy	DNF	
	Christos Karagiorgos	Greece	DNF	
	Karl-Heinz Stadtmüller	East Germany	DQ	
	Vladimir Saloshik	Soviet Union	DQ	

== Participation ==
According to an unofficial count, 21 athletes from 12 countries participated in the event.

- Bulgaria (1)
- Czechoslovakia (1)
- East Germany (3)
- France (2)
- Greece (1)
- Italy (3)
- Poland (1)
- Soviet Union (3)
- Sweden (2)
- Great Britain (2)
- West Germany (1)
- Yugoslavia (1)
