= Church of the Nativity of the Blessed Virgin Mary, Włodawa =

Orthodox church in Włodawa, Poland

Church of the Nativity of the Blessed Virgin Mary
- Cerkiew Narodzenia Najświętszej Maryi Panny
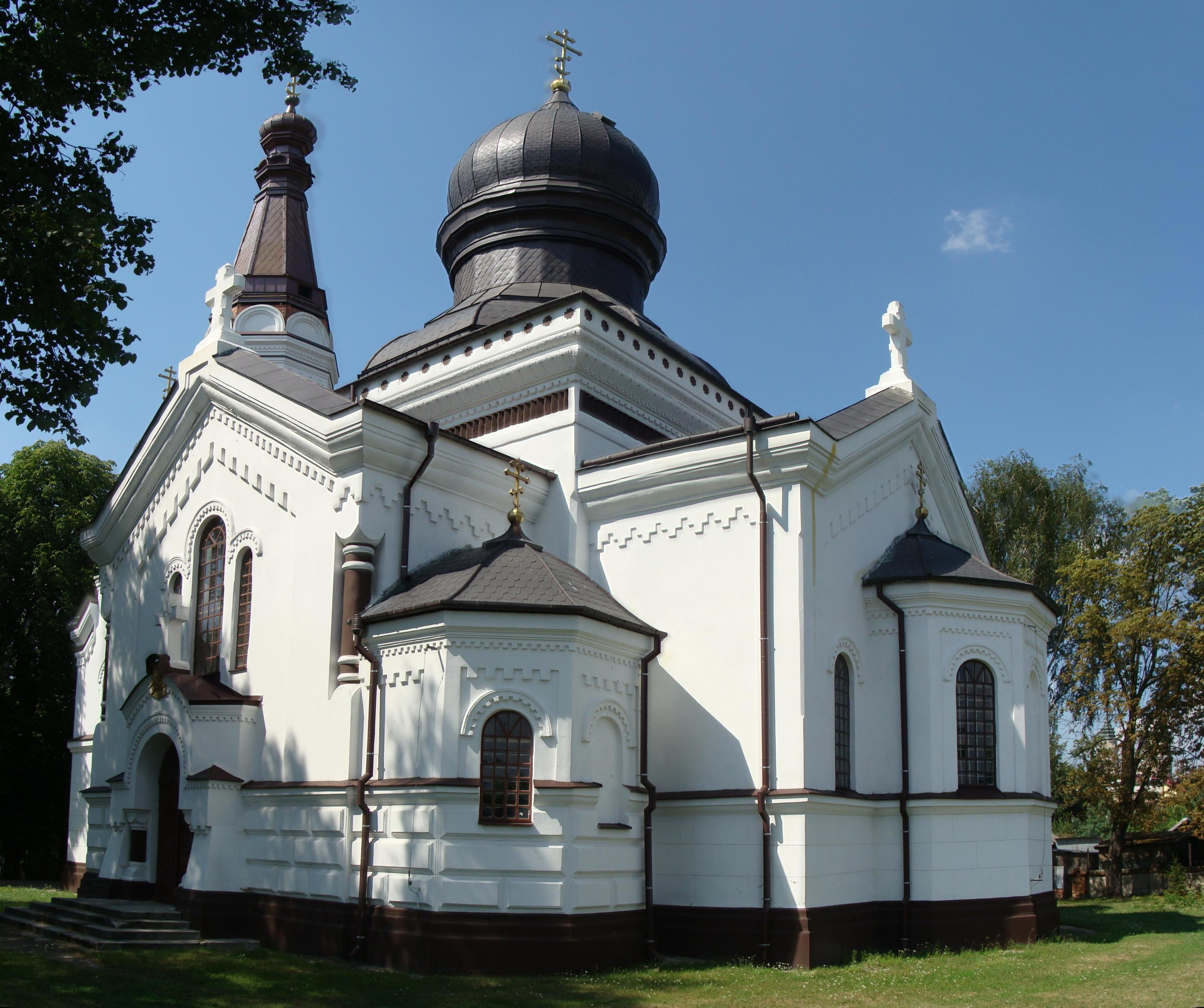

- 51°32′37.8″N 23°33′29.0″E
- Location: Włodawa; 11A Kościelna Street
- Country: Poland
- Denomination: Eastern Orthodoxy
- Previous denomination: Greek Catholic
- Churchmanship: Polish Orthodox Church

History
- Founder: August Zamoyski
- Dedication: Nativity of Mary

Architecture
- Functional status: active Orthodox church
- Architect: Viktor Syczugov
- Style: Eclectic, Neoclassical, Russian Revival
- Years built: 1840–1843
- Completed: 1843; 1891

Specifications
- Materials: brick

Administration
- Diocese: Diocese of Lublin and Chełm

The Church of the Nativity of the Blessed Virgin Mary (also known as: Nativity of the Most Holy Theotokos) is an Orthodox parish church located in Włodawa. It belongs to the parish of the same dedication, which is part of the Chełm Deanery of the Diocese of Lublin and Chełm of the Polish Orthodox Church.

The first mention of an Orthodox church in Włodawa dates back to 1501. Not earlier than 1772, the Włodawa parish came under the jurisdiction of the Uniate Eparchy of Chełm–Belz. The brick Uniate church in Włodawa was built between 1840 and 1843. After the dissolution of the Chełm diocese in 1875, the Włodawa parish was incorporated into the Eparchy of Chełm and Warsaw of the Russian Orthodox Church. Since that time, the church in Włodawa has remained in the hands of Orthodox Christians. Its current appearance is the result of a major reconstruction carried out in the 1890s, during which the church was given features of the Russian, Byzantine-Classical style.

== History ==
=== Early Orthodox churches in Włodawa ===
The first written records of an Orthodox cemetery with a church in Włodawa date back to 1501. It is highly likely that the first church, along with its parish, was founded by the Orthodox Sanguszko family, the local landowners.

The Włodawa parish was part of the Chełm Eparchy of the Ecumenical Patriarchate of Constantinople. It adopted the Union of Brest (signed by the Bishop of Chełm, Dionysius) only after 1772. The long resistance of Włodawa's Orthodox community to the church union was likely influenced by the nearby St. Onuphrius Monastery in Jabłeczna, a strong center of non-unionists. As late as 1620, the Orthodox Bishop of Chełm, Paisius (not recognized by the Polish king), was received in the church.

The sixteenth-century church in Włodawa burned down in 1790. At the time of its destruction, the building contained seven altars. The iconostasis salvaged from the building was moved to the Church of St. Demetrius in Korolówka, where it survived until the destruction of the church during the 1938 campaign to reclaim Orthodox churches.

=== Uniate church ===
A new Uniate church, dedicated to the Nativity of the Blessed Virgin Mary, was active for only a few years. In 1821, the Greek Catholic parish ceased using the building and began renting a Latin Rite chapel. The building was eventually demolished after suffering further damage during the November Uprising.

Due to difficulties posed by the Roman Catholic owners of the previously rented chapel, the Uniates decided in 1840 to build their own church. After obtaining the necessary permits and a declaration from Count Stanisław Zamoyski to cover the construction costs, work began. The cornerstone for the first brick church in Włodawa was laid on 14 July 1840. The ceremony was attended by 12 Catholic priests of both Byzantine and Latin rites, local administrator Ivan Riendina, and a group of local landowners and court officials. The first services in the church took place in August 1843, when a neoclassical iconostasis created by Andrzej Cieszyński was installed.

In 1859, a bell tower was built adjacent to the church.

=== Orthodox church ===
==== In the Russian Empire ====
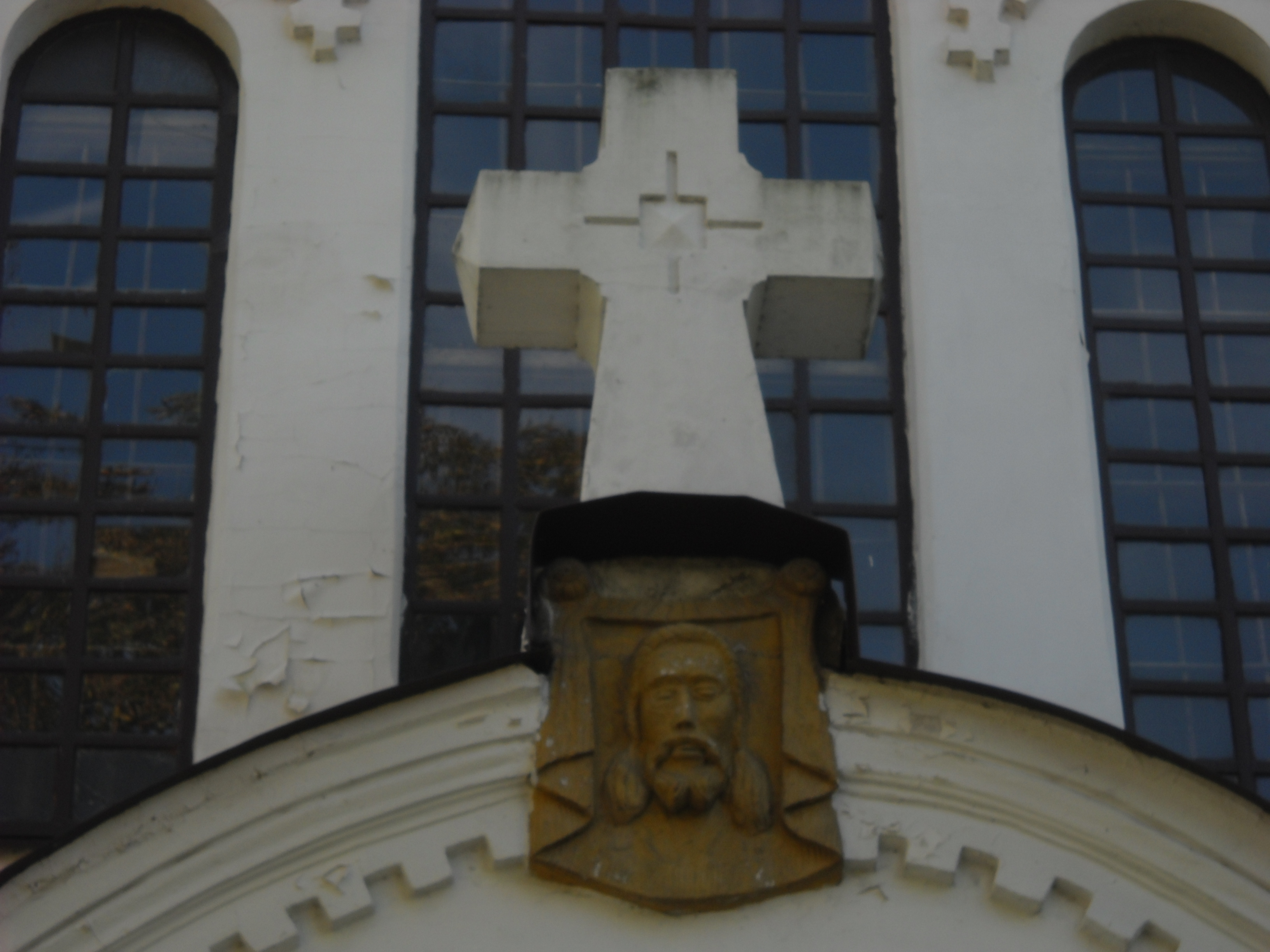
Detail of the building

The Włodawa parish was incorporated into the Eparchy of Chełm and Warsaw of the Russian Orthodox Church in 1875, following the conversion of Chełm Eparchy. In 1874, during a campaign by the Tsarist administration to prepare for its abolition, Włodawa was a site of protests by Uniate residents opposed to converting to Orthodoxy. In the fall of that year, a group of Uniates expelled the parson, a supporter of conversion, from the rectory. They then occupied the church building, removing elements added during the recent reorganization of its interior in the Russian Revival style (such reorganizations were carried out in most churches in the Chełm Land). The protest was suppressed by Russian troops.

In 1882, the church's walls and ceiling were decorated with paintings, and the iconostasis was conserved. The frescoes were created by Harponiuk, a local official, who was paid from voluntary contributions by the faithful and clergy, as well as church funds.

In 1893, the building underwent a major reconstruction, which official records of the Eparchy of Chełm and Warsaw consistory described as the construction of a new church on the site of the demolished old one. The renovation project was designed by Russian architect Viktor Syczugov, a member of the Imperial Academy of Fine Arts, and reviewed by architects A. Chagin and Władimir Pokrowski. The Włodawa church was one of 13 churches designed by Syczugow for Orthodox parishes in the Congress Kingdom.

Major construction work, carried out by Piotr Ksienek from Siedlce, lasted two years, with further renovations continuing until the end of the century. After their completion, the church was consecrated by Bishop Gedeon Pokrowski of Lublin. By the end of the 19th century, there were two bell towers adjacent to the church.

==== In the Second Polish Republic ====
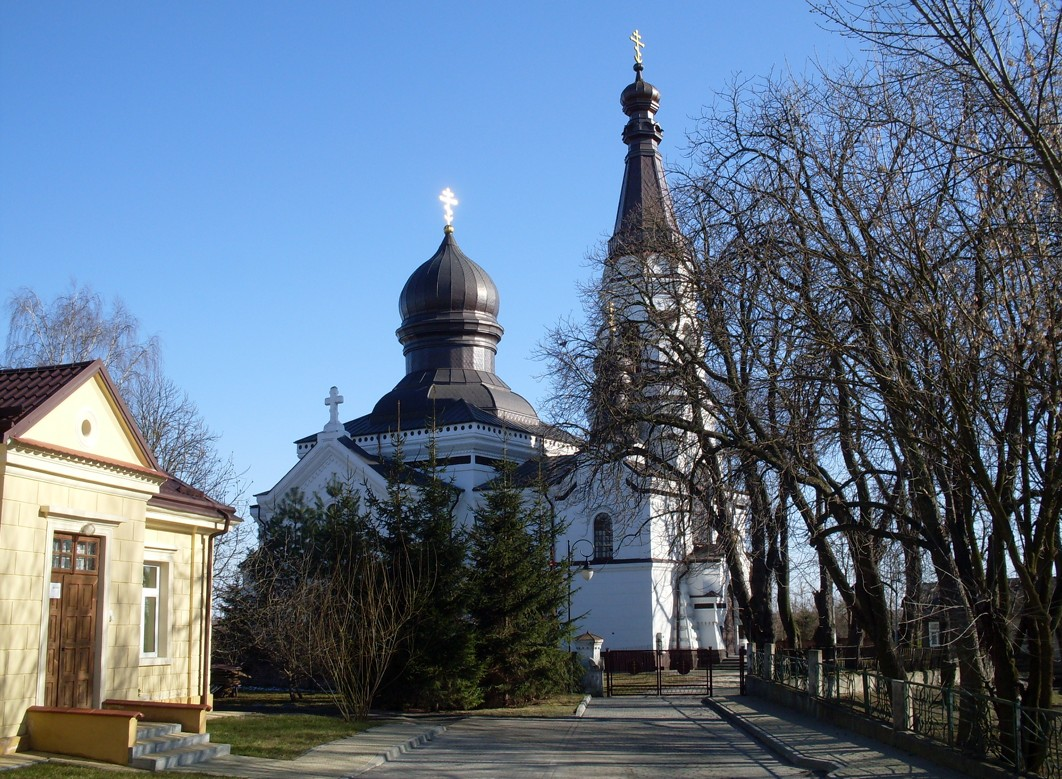
General view of the church, on the right the area of the former cemetery, on the left the rectory building

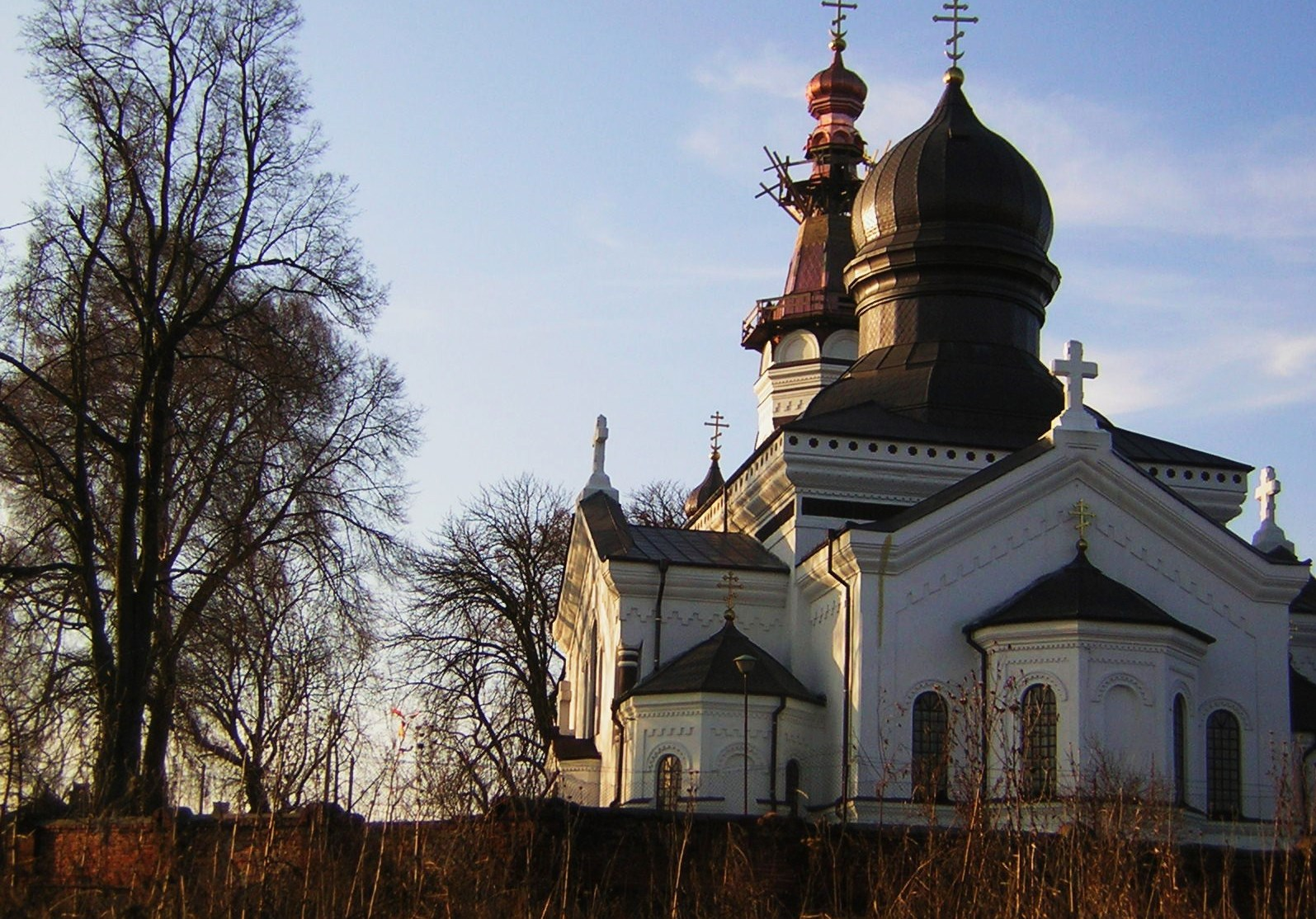
Church from the north

After Poland regained independence, the Orthodox parish in Włodawa continued its activities. In 1921, it had 173 members; by 1931, this number had decreased to 146. The church in Włodawa was one of the six churches in the Włodawa deanery of the Diocese of Chełm and Warsaw.

Following the 1938 campaign to reclaim Orthodox churches, the Włodawa church was one of the five remaining Orthodox churches in the Włodawa area. During the interwar period, the church held patriotic services as mandated by the state authorities, such as in memory of President Gabriel Narutowicz or to commemorate Poland's independence.

==== After World War II ====
Orthodox parish life in Włodawa ceased following the resettlement of local Orthodox Ukrainians to the Soviet Union and the Operation Vistula deportations. The church remained inactive until 1952 and was significantly damaged during this time, with doors and windows broken, some icons destroyed, and the iconostasis damaged. In 1952, the Włodawa parish resumed its activities. The number of Orthodox residents in the town significantly decreased, stabilizing at a few dozen people.

In the 1980s, the church's roof was covered with metal sheets, and in the 1990s, the entire building was plastered, the electrical system was replaced, and an alarm system was installed. In 1997, the polychromies on the matroneum were restored. In 1998, the altar was renovated, and in 1999, two icons were restored. In 2000, the roof was repaired. In 1999, Bishop Abel of Lublin and Chełm consecrated the renovated altar, dedicating it to the Nativity of St. John the Baptist. Between 2006 and 2008, additional icons in the church were successively restored. In 2017, the church's chancel was renovated.

The church hosts cultural events as part of the Festival of Three Cultures.

== Architecture ==
=== Location ===
The Church of the Nativity of the Blessed Virgin Mary is located at 11A Kościelna Street, perched on a slope above the Bug river. The building is surrounded by a green area that was originally a parish cemetery.

=== Building structure ===
The Orthodox church in Włodawa is built of brick and represents a mixed Russian Revival and Neoclassical style (a type of church that is both Russian and Byzantine-classical). The building is oriented and constructed on a Greek cross plan with three apses on the eastern side. Its western arm connects to the facade, which houses the matroneum and the church porch. The building's facade is adorned with three towers – the highest central tower and two smaller ones. The central tower is topped with a pyramid-shaped tented roof with a lantern and an onion-shaped dome. Another tower is built over the central point of the cross. All the domes are crowned with Orthodox crosses, while the gables of the transept chapels and the chancel are topped with Latin crosses.

The windows of the building are closed with semicircular arches, decorated with archivolts adorned with dentils. The entrance to the church is through three portals: western (main), northern, and southern, located in the avant-corps. The tripartite building is covered with a barrel vault.

=== Interior ===
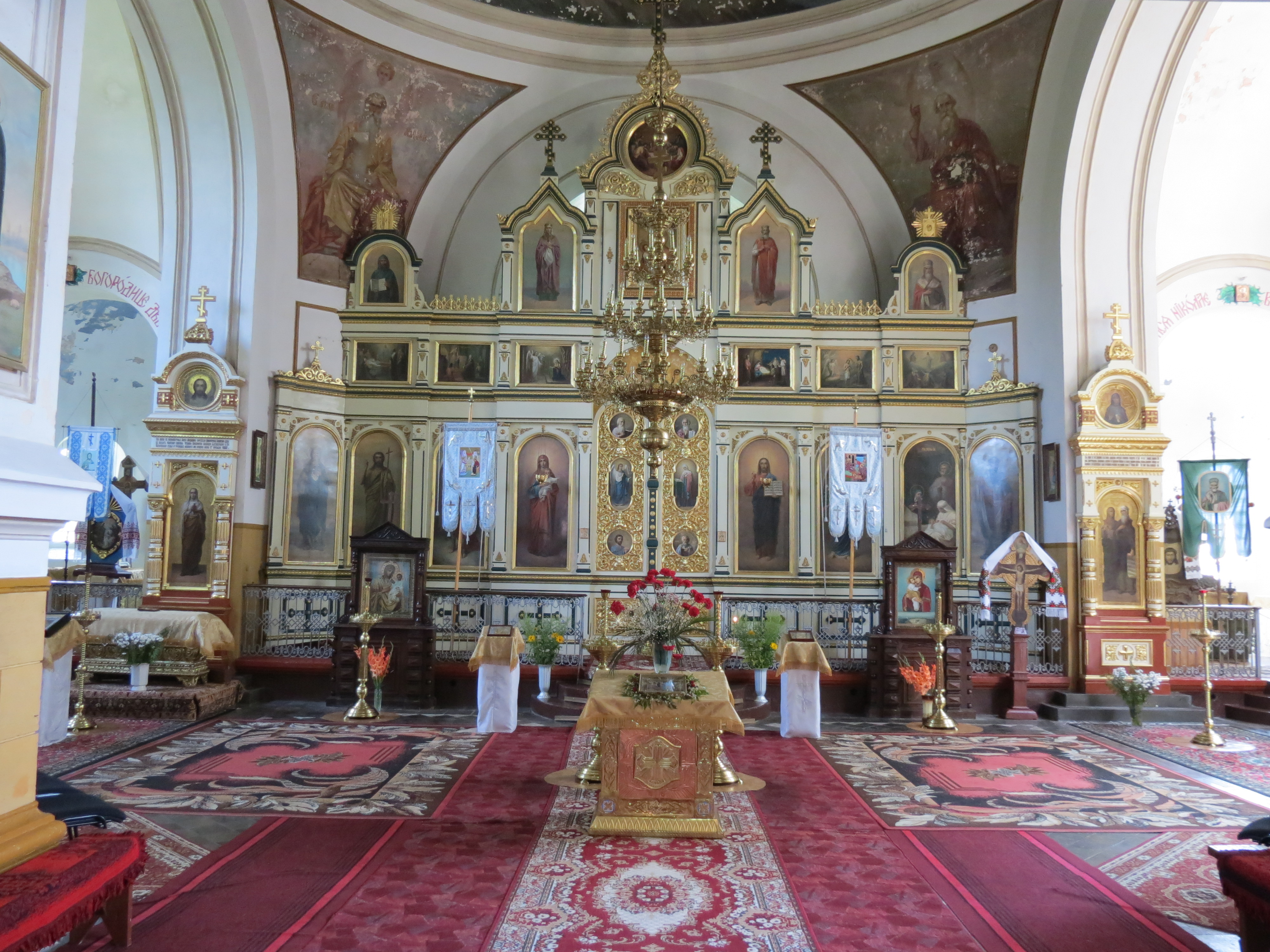
Interior of the church

The iconostasis of the church in Włodawa was dismantled in 1945. As of 2002, the following icons form the iconostasis:

- Bottom row: St. Basil of Caesarea, St. John the Baptist, Mary, Christ Pantocrator, Archangel Michael, Archangel Gabriel, Holy Family
- Middle row of feasts: The Baptism of Christ, Nativity of Christ, Annunciation, Transfiguration of Christ, Dormition of the Theotokos, Entrance of the Theotokos into the Temple
- Top row: St. Barbara, St. Anthony of the Caves, St. Nicholas of Myra, St. Lawrence
- Crowning of the iconostasis: Theotokos and The Last Supper

During World War II and the subsequent resettlements of the Ukrainian population, many elements of the church's furnishings were lost. These included icons such as the Theotokos from the 15th century, St. Theodosia from 1715, a 12th-century Gospel book, a silver chalice, three altar crosses, and ten 16th-century bells. The church interior houses icons and fragments of iconostases from churches destroyed during the interwar period (e.g., from Sobibór and Holeszów), saved by parishioners from demolished churches. Other valuable items in the church include an icon of St. John Chrysostom from the turn of the 17th and 18th centuries and an altar cross from the turn of the 18th and 19th centuries.

The ceiling of the church's chancel was decorated with a painting depicting God the Father surrounded by angels. Above the place where the Gospel is read, there was an image of the Holy Spirit in the form of a dove with the inscription in Church Slavonic: The Holy Spirit envelops you and the power of the Most High overshadows you. The ceiling of the nave featured a painting of the Theotokos covering the world with her omophorion (Protection of the Theotokos) with the inscription: Rejoice our joy, cover us from all evil with your pure robe. The matroneum was adorned with the All-Seeing Eye.

== Bibliography ==
- Lewandowski, Jan (1996). Na pograniczu. Polityka władz państwowych wobec unitów Podlasia i Chełmszczyzny 1772–1875 (in Polish). Lublin: Wydawnictwo Uniwersytetu Marii Curie-Skłodowskiej. ISBN 83-227-0898-X.
- Superczyńska, P. (2002). "Parafia prawosławna we Włodawie". In Olszewski, E. (ed.). Włodawa. Miasto i region na przełomie XX/XXI wieku (in Polish). Lublin–Włodawa: Towarzystwo Przyjaciół Ziemi Włodawskiej. ISBN 83-227-0898-X.
- Seniuk, B. (1996). "Prawosławne cerkwie guberni lubelskiej i siedleckiej zrealizowane według projektów arch. Wiktora Iwanowicza Syczugowa, członka Cesarskiej Akademii Sztuk Pięknych w Petersburgu". Do piękna nadprzyrodzonego. Sesja naukowa na temat rozwoju sztuki sakralnej od X do XX wieku na terenie dawnych diecezji chełmskich Kościoła rzymskokatolickiego, prawosławnego, greckokatolickiego (in Polish). Chełm: Muzeum Chełmskie. ISBN 83-914960-6-6.
