= Ornoch =

Ornoch is a surname. Notable people with the surname include:

- Andrew Ornoch (born 1985), Canadian soccer player and coach
- Jan Ornoch (born 1952), Polish race walker
