= Guéméné =

Guéméné may refer to:

- Guémené-sur-Scorff, commune in Morbihan, Brittany, France
- Guémené-Penfao, commune in Loire-Atlantique, France
- Prince of Guéméné, French noble title within the House of Rohan, derived from Guémené-sur-Scorff

== Similar spellings ==
- Quemener, Breton surname
- Gemenea, river and villages in Romania
