= Stanisław Baj =

Polish painter (born 1953)

Stanisław Baj (born 3 June 1953 in Dołhobrody) is a Polish painter.

== Accolades ==
- Jan Cybis Award (2024)
