= Quemener =

Quemener, Quéméner, Quéméneur, Quémeneur or Kemener is a surname, and may refer to:

Quemener derives from kemener which means tailor in Breton.

- Roger Quemener (1941–2021), French racewalker
- Ronan Quemener (born 1988), French ice hockey goaltender
- Nicolas Quemener (born 1964), French musician, member of Kornog and Skeduz.
- Hervé Quéméner, French writer
- Olivier Quemener (died 1994), French independent journalist assassinated in Algeria during the Algerian Civil War.
- Julien Quemener, a Paris Saint-Germain F.C. ultra killed by a police officer during a hooligan incident in 2006: see Paris Saint-Germain F.C. supporters
- Yann-Fañch Kemener (born 1957 as Jean-François Quémener) French traditional singer of Kan ha diskan
- Perrig Quéméneur (born 1984), French road bicycle racer
- Pierre Quéméneur (1877–1923), French politician and entrepreneur, a victim in the Seznec Affair
