= Kora Boufflert =

French racewalker

Kora Boufflert (born Sommerfeld; 23 April 1966 at the Havre) is a former French athlete, who specialized in race walking.

Very early on attracted by the ultra-distance walk racing (145 km at the 24 hour walk of Rouen in 1987), she also had a career in speed walking.

In 1993 and 1994 she won two caps for France for the 10km walk. In 1994 and 1995 she beat the world records for the 100 km walk (10h13:56 at Roubaix on 9 October 1994) and the 50 km< walk (4h41:57 on 17 September 1995).

She won Paris-Colmar Women's walk race (25-27 May 1995) covering the 333 km course in 45h02.

Having achieved her sporting goals, she stopped high-level competition for several years.

Upon her return, she retook her place at the top of the hierarchy of ultra-distance walk racing. On 24 April 2005, at Bar le Duc, she established a new standard for long-distance walking. She covered 170 km in 19 h 56 min 41 s, and in 2006 she won a second female Paris-Colmar race walk.

In 2007, she competed in the male Paris-Colmar walk. She ended at 7th place covering 451 km in 63h16.

The following years she turned to the 24 hours race walk. She received 2 new international selections in 2008 and 2009, and she walked 224 km 440m on 1 May 2008 at the 24 h Brive race walk.

== Personal bests ==
- 3 000 m walk : 13 min 33 s 8
- 5 000 m walk : 23 min 51 s 5
- 10 km walk : 48 min 48 s
- 20 km walk : 1 h 43 min 15 s
- 50 km walk : 4 h 41 min 57 s
- 100 km walk : 10 h 13 min 56 s
- 170 km walk : 19 h 56 min 41 s
- 24 h course : 224.440 km
