= Pawluki =

- Village
- Location within Poland
- Coordinates: 51°40′N 23°33′E
- Country: Poland
- Voivodeship: Lublin
- County: Włodawa
- Gmina: Hanna

Pawluki [paˈvluki] is a village in the administrative district of Gmina Hanna, within Włodawa County, Lublin Voivodeship, in eastern Poland, close to the border with Belarus.

== GPS Coordinates ==
- DD Coordinates: 51.666664 23.5499978
- DMS Coordinates: 51°39'59.99" N 23°32'59.99" E
- Geohash Coordinates: u90tzvss4sppg
- UTM Coordinates: 34U 676342.59842712 5727043.7494987
