= Wilfried Wesch =

German racewalker (1940–2024)

Personal information
- Nationality: German
- Born: 7 July 1940 Mannheim, Germany
- Died: 17 May 2024 (aged 83)

Sport
- Sport: Athletics
- Event: Racewalking

Wilfried Wesch (7 July 1940 – 17 May 2024) was a German racewalker. He competed in the men's 20 kilometres walk at the 1972 Summer Olympics.

Wesch died on 17 May 2024, at the age of 83.
