= Sheffield Star Walk =

Amateur walking race

- Sheffield Star logo
- Status: Dormant event
- Genre: Racewalking competition
- Date: Whit Tuesday
- Frequency: Annual
- Location: Sheffield
- Country: England
- Inaugurated: 1922
- Most recent: 2000
- Organiser: Sheffield Star newspaper

The Sheffield Star Walk was an amateur walking race organised by the Sheffield Star newspaper and held in Sheffield, England. The event, open to amateur walkers, was run annually from 1922 until 2000 over a distance of 12–20 miles (19–32 km). It attracted up to 250,000 spectators and some of the entrants, such as Roland Hardy and John Warhurst, went on to represent their country at the Olympics and Commonwealth Games. Women were permitted to enter from the early 1970s. In the ‘90s, its popularity declined, and the event was cancelled, being last run in 2000. It was brought back for a one-off event in 2013 to raise money to erect the Women of Steel statue.

== History ==
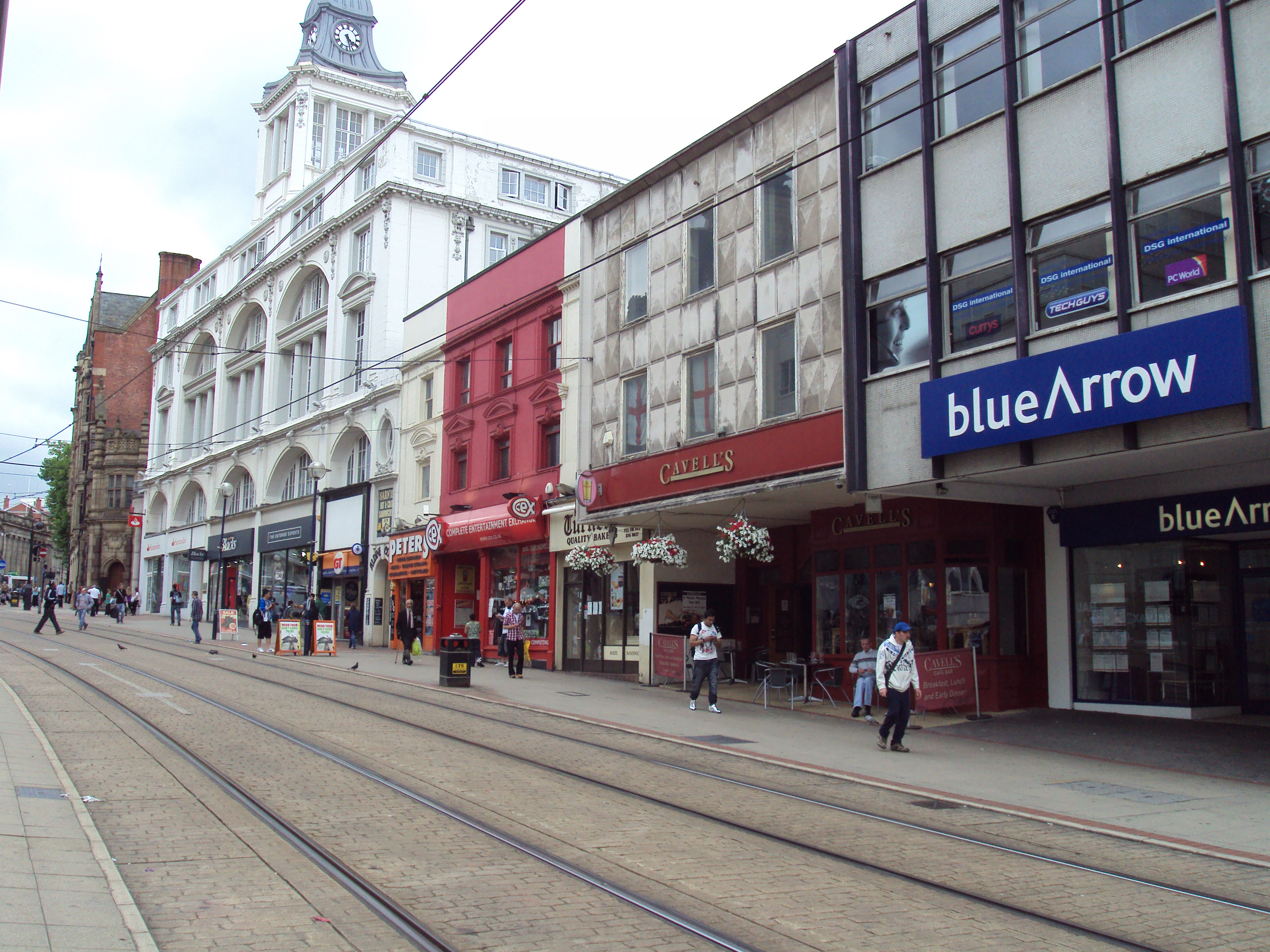
Sheffield High Street

The Sheffield Star Run was a walking race organised by the Sheffield Star newspaper. The first event took place in 1922 with 272 men competing over a distance of 12 miles (19 km), the race started in the city's High Street and ended at the Corporation Street public baths. Finishers received lunch and a mug of hot Oxo (a meat stock product). The entry requirements varied but typically only amateurs from the local area were permitted to compete. At various times the local requirement was defined as those living within 30 miles (48 km) of Sheffield Town Hall or within 20 miles (32 km) of the Sheffield Star offices.

The event was traditionally held on Whit Tuesday, for which local steelworkers were given a day off, and was held annually from 1922 to 2000 apart from a 6-year break during the Second World War. The first competitors raising money for charity entered in 1925. By the 1930s a medal was being provided to finishers as well as the traditional mug of Oxo. The 1947 event was won by Lol Allen who went on to represent Great Britain at the 1952 Summer Olympics in Helsinki, Finland. The 1949 event was won by Roland Hardy, in his first competitive race he broke the course record by 53 seconds. Hardy competed alongside Allen at the 1952 Olympics and also represented his country at the 1956 Summer Olympics in Melbourne, Australia. Hardy regarded the 1949 Star Walk as the most memorable race of his career. At some time the route was changed; still starting at the High Street the walkers went through Hillsborough, Grenoside and Ecclesfield before finishing outside the Owlerton Stadium, a greyhound race track.

During the 1950s the event was very popular in the city, with some 250,000 spectators lining the route. Future Labour Party politician and M.P. for Bolsover, Dennis Skinner, entered in 1956 after just six weeks of training. He came second, though he thought he could have won if he had not slowed down his pace in anticipation of a steep hill. As well as a runners-up cup Skinner received a razor blade in a leather case. The popularity of the event, which had sometimes attracted thousands of entrants, soon declined and in 1958 only 38 walkers participated. In 1964 Mick Barker set the record for the 12-mile version of the event, at 98 minutes 15 seconds, which remained unbeaten. The 1967 race winner John Warhurst represented England at the 1974 British Commonwealth Games, held in Christchurch, New Zealand.

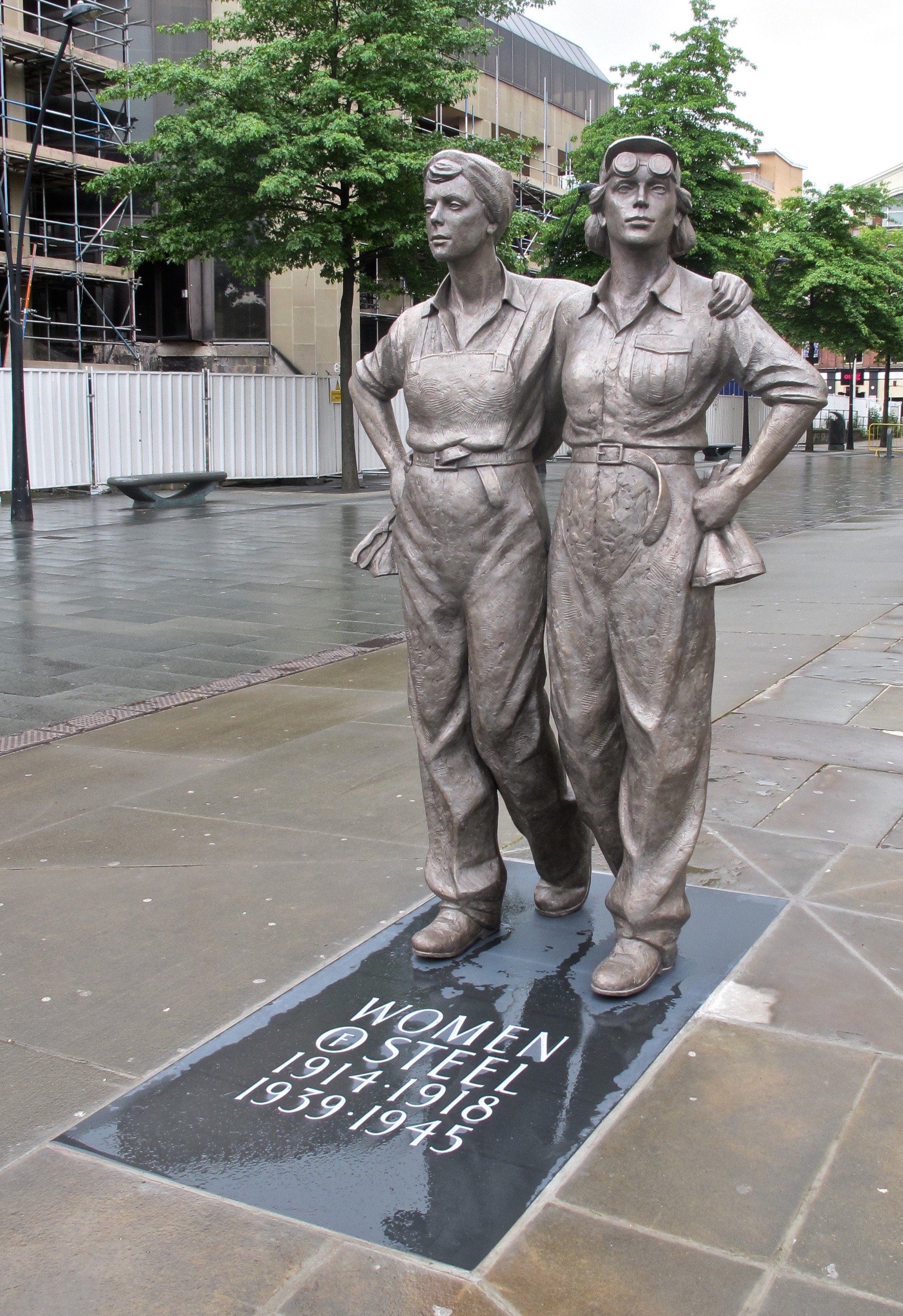
Women of Steel statue

The race length was increased to 20 miles (32 km) at some point in the 1960s and afterwards its popularity increased. The entry requirements were also amended at some point and by the late 1960s entrants were permitted from outside of South Yorkshire. The first fancy dress entries were made in 1969 and in the 1970s the lower age limit was reduced and women permitted to enter for the first time; the 1973 event saw 153 women entrants. In later years the number of entrants reduced as other races, with cash prizes, became more popular. The annual Star Walk was stopped in 2000, but was brought back as a one-time-only event in 2013 to raise funds for the city's Women of Steel statue.
