= Ernest Romens =

French racewalker

Ernest Romens (1904–1954) was a French racewalker.

Romens won the extreme racewalking, Paris-Strasbourg march in 1933, 1935 and 1937. At its third victory, he broke the record time 300 km of road. He received dozens of telegrams from the American Alsatian community, which followed his progress in the press.

== Bibliography ==
- André Rauch (1997). La marche la vie. Edition autrement.
