= Gmina Hanna =

Gmina Hanna Hanna Commune
- Gmina
- Coat of arms
- Interactive map of Gmina Hanna
- Coordinates (Hanna): 51°43′N 23°30′E
- Country: Poland
- Voivodeship: Lublin
- County: Włodawa
- Seat: Hanna

Area
  - Total: 139.02 km^{2} (53.68 sq mi)

Population (2006)
  - Total: 3,339
  - Density: 24.02/km^{2} (62.21/sq mi)
- Website: http://gmina.hanna.sisco.info/

Gmina Hanna is a rural gmina (administrative district) in Włodawa County, Lublin Voivodeship, in eastern Poland, on the border with Belarus and close to Ukraine. Its seat is the village of Hanna, which lies approximately 25 kilometres (16 mi) north of Włodawa.

The gmina covers an area of 139.02 square kilometres (53.7 sq mi), and as of 2006 its total population is 3,339.

== Villages ==
Gmina Hanna contains the villages and settlements of Dańce, Dołhobrody, Hanna, Holeszów, Holeszów PGR, Janówka, Konstantyn, Kuzawka, Lack, Nowy Holeszów, Pawluki and Zaświatycze.

== Neighbouring gminas ==
Gmina Hanna is bordered by the gminas of Sławatycze, Sosnówka, Tuczna, Włodawa and Wyryki. It also borders Belarus.
