= Howard Timms =

British racewalker

Personal information
- Nationality: British
- Born: 9 July 1944 (age 82)

Sport
- Sport: Athletics
- Event: Racewalking

Howard Timms (born 9 July 1944) is a British racewalker. He competed in the men's 50 kilometres walk at the 1972 Summer Olympics.
