= Janówka, Włodawa County =

Janówka
- Village
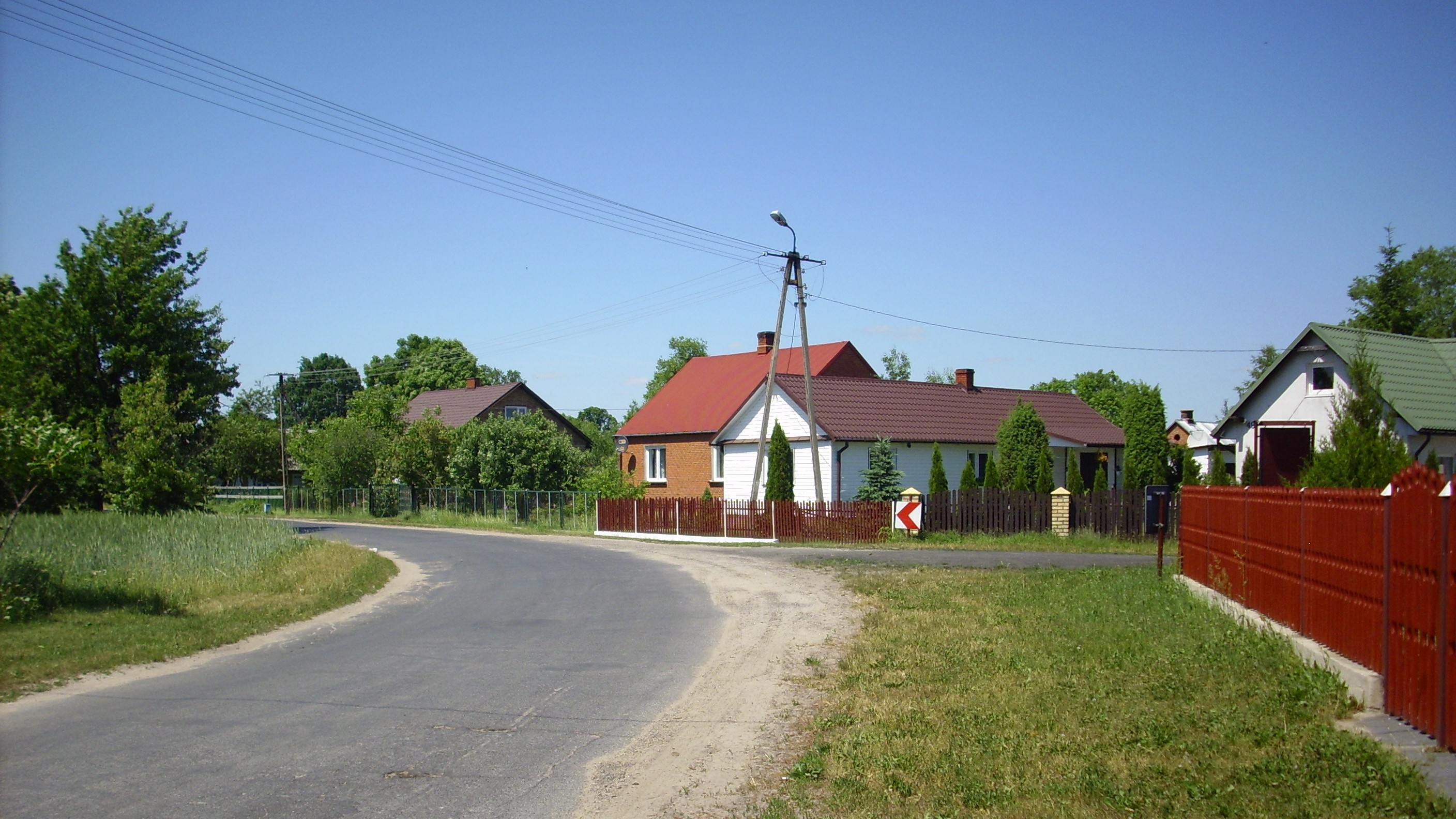

- Location within Poland
- Coordinates: 51°45′30″N 23°27′37″E
- Country: Poland
- Voivodeship: Lublin
- County: Włodawa
- Gmina: Hanna
- Time zone: UTC+1 (CET)
  - Summer (DST): UTC+2 (CEST)

Janówka [jaˈnufka] is a village in the administrative district of Gmina Hanna, within Włodawa County, Lublin Voivodeship, in eastern Poland, close to the border with Belarus.

== History ==
Five Polish citizens were murdered by Nazi Germany in the village during World War II.
