= Grzegorz Adam Urbanowski =

Polish racewalker

Personal information
- Born: 24 December 1959 (age 66) Pułtusk, Poland

Sport
- Country: Poland
- Events: Racewalking, Ultramarathon

Grzegorz Adam Urbanowski (born 24 December 1959 in Pultusk), Polish ultramarathon racewalker. Sports career started as a cyclist, then for a short period competed in long-distance running, finally settling on a sporty gait. In 1990, he won the Polish Championship, and in 1991 the title of vice-Polish 50 km (3:58:19 - PB) since 1992, specializes in marches at distances of 200 km or more. He won ten times (in the years 1994, 1996–98, 2001–03, 2005-07) the Paris-Colmar, setting a historical record for the competition previously held by Roger Quemener.

== See also ==
- 1983 IAAF World Race Walking Cup
- 1989 IAAF World Race Walking Cup
