= Gabriel Hernández (athlete) =

Mexican racewalker (born 1949)

Personal information
- Nationality: Mexican
- Born: 19 November 1949 (age 76)

Sport
- Sport: Athletics
- Event: Racewalking

Gabriel Hernández (born 19 November 1949) is a Mexican racewalker. He competed in the men's 50 kilometres walk at the 1972 Summer Olympics.
