= Hanna, Lublin Voivodeship =

Hanna
- Village
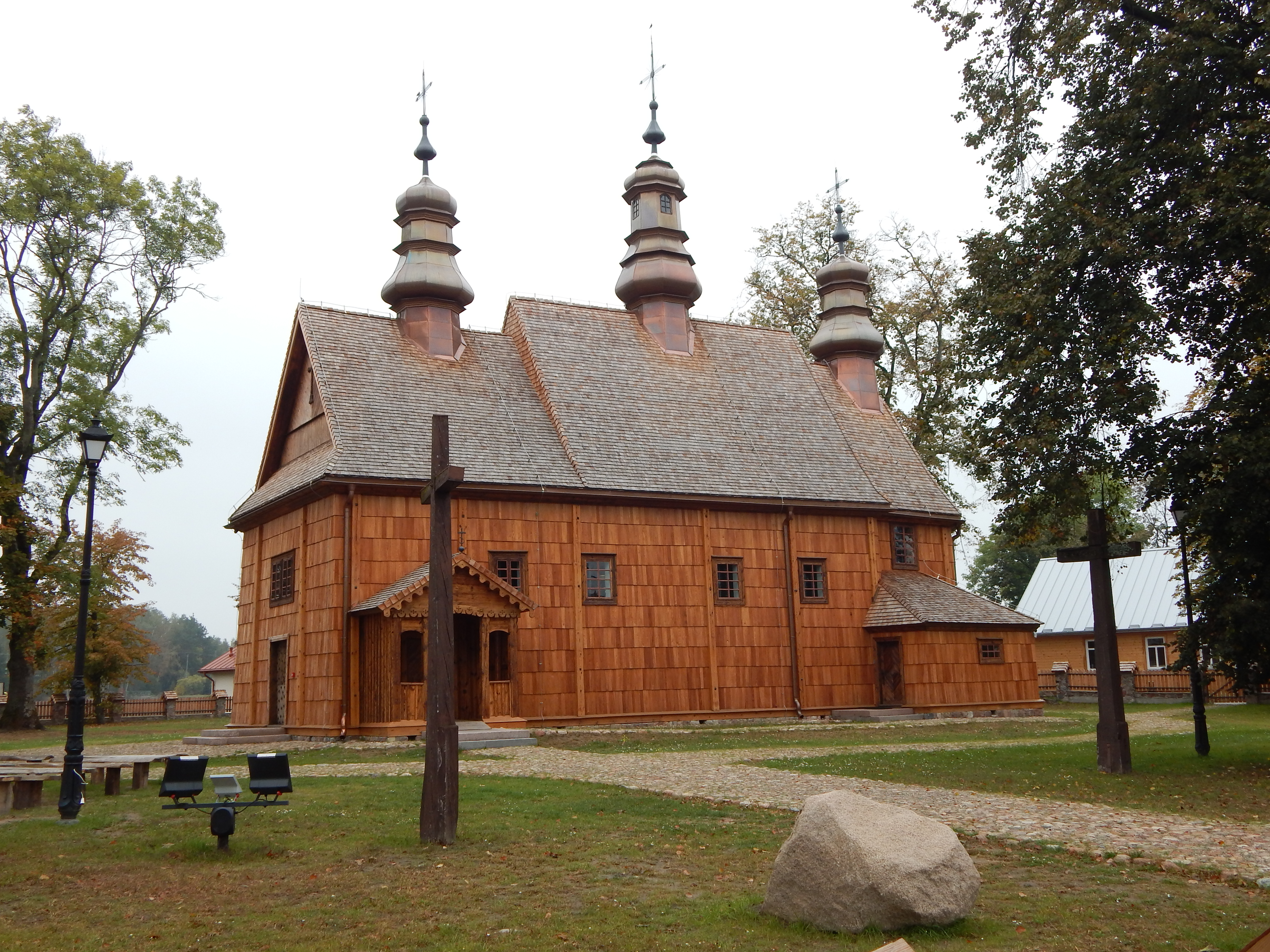
- Church of Saints Peter and Paul

- Location within Poland
- Coordinates: 51°43′N 23°30′E
- Country: Poland
- Voivodeship: Lublin
- County: Włodawa
- Gmina: Hanna

Population
  - Total: 790

Hanna [ˈxanna] is a village in Włodawa County, Lublin Voivodeship, in eastern Poland, close to the border with Belarus. It is the seat of the gmina (administrative district) called Gmina Hanna.
