= Robert Rinchard =

Belgian race walker (1931–2024)

- Born: 29 May 1931; Mornimont, Jemeppe-sur-Sambre, Belgium
- Died: 20 July 2024 (aged 93); Namur, Belgium
- Occupations: Athlete, civil servant, journalist
- Employer(s): Belgian Ministry of Finance, l'avenir newspaper
- Organization: Entente Sportive Jambes
- Known for: Ultra-distance race walking, three time winner of Paris-Colmar
- Children: 3

Robert Rinchard (29 May 1931 – 20 July 2024) was a Belgian race walker who excelled over long, and ultra long distances. He won the Paris-Strasburg ultra long-distance race three times, in 1973, 1974 and 1976, after which he retired from competitive sport. Rinchard died in Namur on 20 July 2024, at the age of 93.

== Race walking career ==
In the 1950s Rinchard became a journalist covering local news, and especially sports in his home region of Namur. By the 1960s he had become a champion race walker. Rinchard was the Belgian champion of the 20 km race walk in 1963, 1968 and 1969. He was the Belgian champion of the 50 km race walk in 1966, 1969 and 1971. In 1972 he became the Belgian champion in the 100 kilometer race walk.

At the 1969 European Athletics Championships in Athens, he finished 19th in the 20 km walk and 13th in the Men's 50 kilometres walk.

Later, he focused on ultra-long distances. He won the Paris-Colmar three times, in 1973 (493 km), 1974 (523 km) and 1976 (533 km). In 1976, he set a record hourly average of 7.709 km.

In 1974 he set a personal best for the 200 km race walk at 21 hours, 56 minutes and 39 seconds during the Les 28 heures de Roubaix. It is the 28th fastest time for this distance. He would win the Les 28 heures de Roubaix in both 1974 and 1975, covering 255 km and 239 km respectively.

In 1974 he received the Sports Merit of the province of Namur.

In 1975, he won the first edition of the 24-hour walking race in Château-Thierry, a qualifier for the Strasbourg-Paris race walk. He walked 205 km over 24 hours, 6 minutes and 38 seconds.

After winning his third Paris-Colmar in 1976, Rinchard quit competition, later becoming a civil servant at the Belgian Ministry of Finance.
