= Ismael Avila =

Mexican racewalker

Personal information
- Nationality: Mexican
- Born: 22 September 1949 (age 76)

Sport
- Sport: Athletics
- Event: Racewalking

Ismael Avila (born 22 September 1949) is a Mexican racewalker. He competed in the men's 20 kilometres walk at the 1972 Summer Olympics.
