= Paris-Colmar =

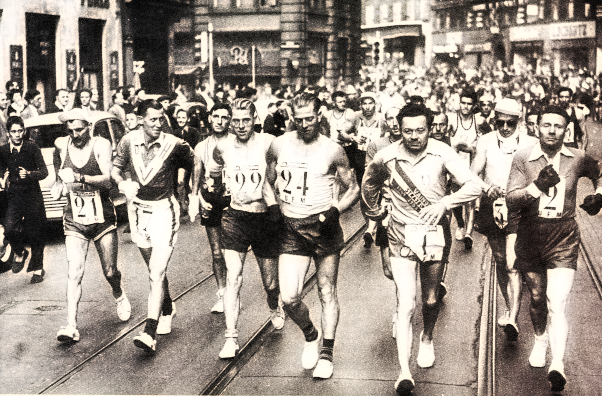
Start from Strasbourg, 1957

Paris-Colmar is an annual racewalking competition covering about 445 kilometers for men, and 300 kilometers for women and for men who participate for the first time. The competition began in 1926 as race from Strasbourg to Paris. The contest for women has been held since 1988.

The race presently starts in Neuilly-sur-Marne (Seine-Saint-Denis) for the men and in Châlons-en-Champagne (Marne) for the women. They arrive in Colmar after more than 50 hours of racewalking. Special breaks are included to exchange food and clothing. In 2007, the prize for the winner in the men's contest 8,000 euros and 5,000 euros for women. The current participants are largely from Eastern Europe. A prospective contestant must qualify for the Paris-Colmar competition by walking a certain distance in 24 hours.

Hervé Delarras and Roger Quemener, are respectively director and vice director of the event and of the Cercle des sports de France club.

The competition was stopped :

- From 1938 to 1948,
- From 1960 to 1969,
- in 2004 and 2010.

In 2015, the final destination switched to Ribaeauville, a few miles North of Colmar. All races in the history of the event have been between Paris and the Alsace region bordering Germany.

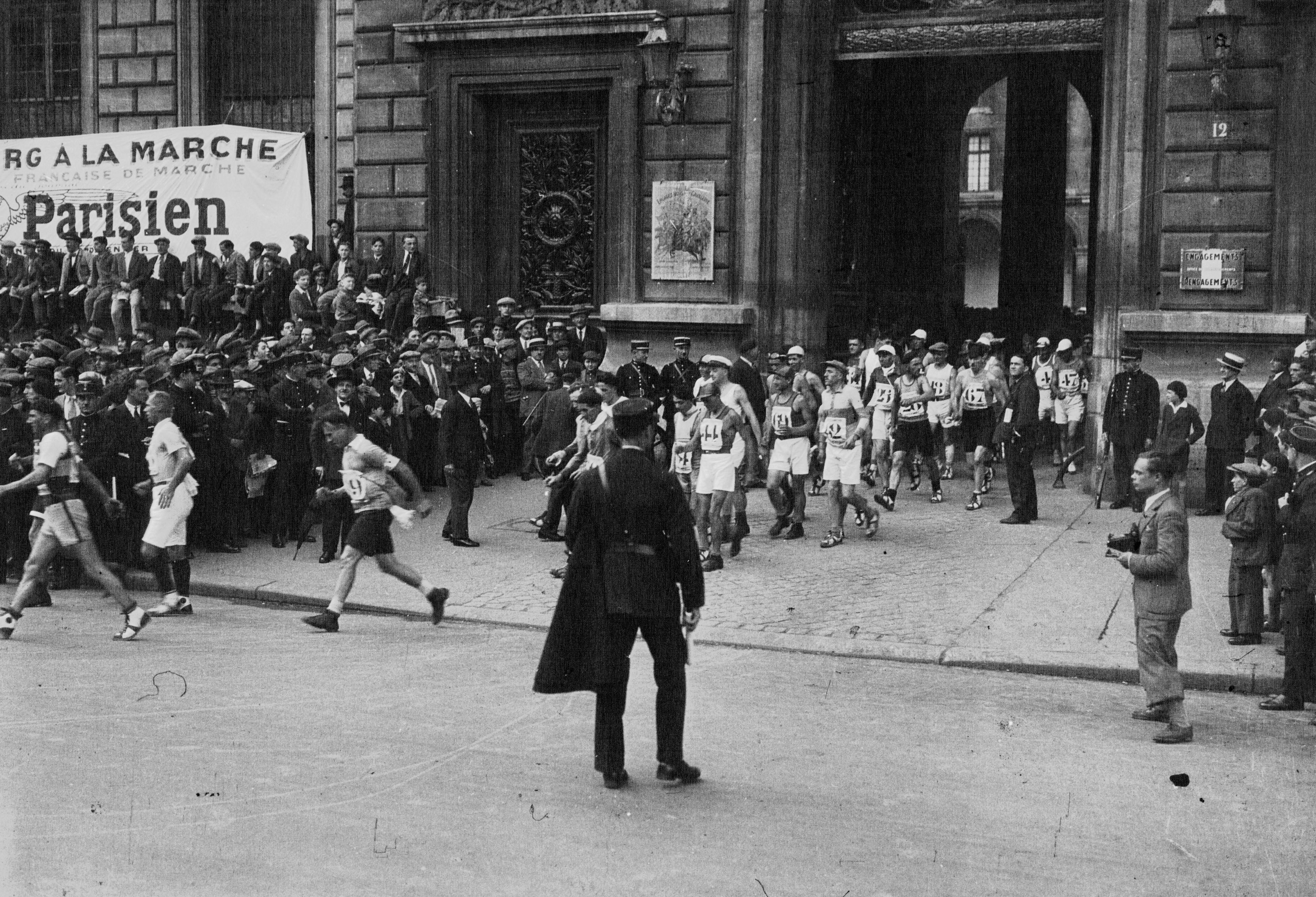
Start in 1932

== Palmarès ==
=== 1926 to 1937 : Paris-Strasbourg ===
Year	Name	Nationality	Distance in km	Time	Pace km/h
1926	Jean Lindner	Switzerland	504	78:47 h	6.397
1927	Jean Lindner	Switzerland	504	72:01 h	6.998
1928	Louis Godart	France	504	75:45 h	6.653
1929	Louis Godart	France	506	72:48 h	6.951
1930	Marceau Roger	France	506	69:44 h	7.256
1931	Louis Godart	France	503	72:25 h	6.946
1932	Victor Damas	France	506	68:33 h	7.381
1933	Ernest Romens	France	535	79:11 h	6.756
1934	Pierre Mouchkoff	Soviet Union	523	74:08 h	7.055
1935	Ernest Romens	France	524	71:53 h	7.290
1936	Alfred Steinmetz	France	533	74:33 h	7.150
1937	Ernest Romens	France	533	74:33 h	7.150

=== 1949 to 1959 : Paris-Strasbourg or Strasbourg-Paris ===
Year	Name	Nationality	Distance in km	Time	Pace km/h
1949	Gilbert Roger	France	520	73:51 h	7.041
1950	Joseph Zami	France	516	73:55 h	6.981
1951	Albert Seibert	France	516	69:29 h	7.426
1952	Albert Seibert	France	552	75:10 h	7.344
1953	Gilbert Roger	France	515	66:50 h	7.706
1954	Gilbert Roger	France	526	70:34 h	7.454
1955	Louis Godart (Fils)	France	520	71:26 h	7.280
1956	Gilbert Roger	France	522	68:31 h	7.619
1957	Gilbert Roger	France	522	69:38 h	7.496
1958	Gilbert Roger	France	537	71:13 h	7.540
1959	Edmond Guny	France	529	70:42 h	7.482

=== 1970 to 1980 : Paris-Strasbourg or Strasbourg-Paris ===
Year	Name	Nationality	Distance in km	Time	Pace km/h
1970	Sammy Zaugg	France	512	70:04 h	7.307
1971	Josy Simon	Luxembourg	520	73:08 h	7.110
1972	Josy Simon	Luxembourg	513	73:03 h	7.023
1973	Robert Rinchard	Belgium	493	64:34 h	7.636
1974	Robert Rinchard	Belgium	523	67:29 h	7.750
1975	Josy Simon	Luxembourg	507	66:50 h	7.586
1976	Robert Rinchard	Belgium	533	69:11 h	7.704
1977	Robert Schouckens	Belgium	507	64:11 h	7.899
1978	Josy Simon	Luxembourg	501	66:10 h	7.572
1979	Roger Quemener	France	510	64:24 h	7.919
1980	Roger Pietquin	Belgium	506	60:01 h	8.431

=== From 1981 : Paris-Colmar ===
Year	Men	Nationality	Distance km	Time	Pace km/h	Women	Nationality	Distanz km	Time	Pace km/h
1981	Roger Pietquin	Belgium	513	65:11 h	7.870					
1982	Adrien Pheulpin	France	508	66:30 h	7.639					
1983	Roger Quemener	France	518	64:12 h	8.069					
1984	J.-C. Gouvenaux	France	516	62:31 h	8.254					
1985	Roger Quemener	France	518	64:57 h	7.975					
1986	Roger Quemener	France	517	62:27 h	8.279					
1987	Roger Quemener	France	518	64:59 h	7.971					
1988	Roger Quemener	France	533	66:37 h	8.001	Édith Couhé	France	368	55:27 h	6.637
1989	Roger Quemener	France	524	64:35 h	8.114	Édith Couhé	France	376	52:51 h	7.114
1990	Zbigniew Klapa	Poland	522	64:36 h	8.080	Édith Couhé	France	340	50:30 h	6.733
1991	Zbigniew Klapa	Poland	523	64:51 h	8.065	Édith Couhé	France	340	51:15 h	6.634
1992	Zbigniew Klapa	Poland	518	62:38 h	8.270	Édith Couhé	France	333	47:38 h	6.991
1993	Noel Dufay	France	518	62:18 h	8.315	Isabelle Duchêne	France	334	42:59 h	7.770
1994	G. A. Urbanowski	Poland	520	61:48 h	8.414					
1995	Zbigniew Klapa	Poland	521	60:13 h	8.652	Kora Boufflert	France	333	45:02 h	7.395
1996	G. A. Urbanowski	Poland	520	60:29 h	8.597	Isabelle Duchêne	France	331	41:58 h	7.887
1997	G. A. Urbanowski	Poland	534	64:02 h	8.339	Marleen Radder	Netherlands	344	46:14 h	7.441
1998	G. A. Urbanowski	Poland	521	62:26 h	8.345	Delcina Pajoul	France	343	45:24 h	7.555
1999	Zbigniew Klapa	Poland	521	58:53 h	8.700	Delcina Pajoul	France	343	45:53 h	7.475
2000	Alexseï Rodionov	Russia	535	66:18 h	8.069	Irina Poutintseva	Russia	360	47:35 h	7.566
2001	G. A. Urbanowski	Poland	535	65:38 h	8.151	Marleen Radder	Netherlands	360	49:24 h	7.287
2002	G. A. Urbanowski	Poland	535	67:32 h	7.922	Marleen Radder	Netherlands	360	50:23 h	7.145

- 2003 start of Paris-Colmar from 4 to 7 June.

Rank	Men	Nationality	Distance km	Time	Pace km/h	Women	Nationality	Distance km	Time	Pace km/h
1.	G. A. Urbanowski	Poland	515	66:40 h	7.725	Irina Poutintseva	Russia	340	48:56 h	6.948
2.	Gilles Letessier	France	id.	+ 2:13 h	7.476	Marina Tarassevich	Belarus	id.	+ 0:03 h	6.941
3.	Jean Cecillon	France	id.	+ 3:22 h	7.354	Delcina Pajoul	France	id.	+ 2:10 h	6.656

- 2004 not occurred
- 2005 start Paris-Colmar from 8 to 11 June

Rank	Men	Nationality	Distance km	Time	Pace km/h	Women	Nationality	Distance km	Time	Pace km/h
1.	G. A. Urbanowski	Poland	440	55:00 h	8.000	Anne-Marie Mesmoudi	France	265	35:20 h	7.500
2.	Alexseï Rodionov	Russia	id.	+ 0:49 h	7.883	Irina Poutintseva	Russia	id.	+ 0:31 h	7.392
3.	Philippe Morel	France	id.	+ 1:39 h	7.670	Francine Lachia	France	id.	+ 3:39 h	6.798

- 2006 start Paris-Colmar from 31 May to 3 June.

Rank	Men	Nationality	Distance km	Time	Pace km/h	Women	Nationality	Distance km	Time	Pace km/h
1.	G. A. Urbanowski	Poland	448	54:13 h	8.263	Kora Boufflert	France	293	37:09 h	7.887
2.	Sergueï Dvoretski	Russia	id.	+ 1:35 h	8.029	Irina Poutintseva	Russia	id.	+ 1:28 h	7.587
3.	David Regy	France	id.	+ 2:04 h	7.960	Sylviane Varin	France	id.	+ 3:05 h	7.283

- 2007 start Paris-Colmar from 7 to 10 June.

Rank	Men	Nationality	Distance km	Time	Pace km/h	Women	Nationality	Distance km	Time	Pace km/h
1.	G. A. Urbanowski	Poland	451	57:04 h	7.903	Anne-Marie Mesmoudi	France	306	38:09 h	8.021
2.	Alexseï Rodionov	Russia	id.	+ 1:05 h	7.756	Irina Poutintseva	Russia	id.	+ 1:28 h	7.724
3.	Philippe Morel	France	id.	+ 2:01 h	7.633	Marina Tarassevich	Belarus	id.	+ 3:05 h	7.421

- 2008 start Paris-Colmar from 18 to 21 June.

Distance 444 km, women 305.7 km, and Promotion 292.3 km.

Rank	Men	Time	Pace km/h	Women	Time	Pace km/h	Promotion	Time	Pass km/h
1.	(Russia) S. Dvoretski	52:43 h	8.422	(France) S. Varin	41:52 h	7.302	(France) Ph. Thibaux	34:35 h	8.452
2.	(Russia) D. Osipov	+ 0:40 h	8.317	(France) C. Anxionnat	+ 1:09 h	7.107	(France) D. Ruelle	+ 1:49 h	8.030
3.	(Russia) A. Rodionov	+ 4:02 h	7.824	(France) D. Alverhne	+ 1:32 h	7.044	(Belgium) L. Schaerlaeckens	+ 3:24 h	7.695

- 2009 start Paris-Colmar from 18 to 21 June.

Distance 471.5 km, women and promotion 316.8 km.

Rank	Men	Time	Pace km/h	Women	Time	Pace km/h	Promotion	Time	Pass km/h
1.	(Russia) D. Osipov	59:12 h	7.965	(France) S. Varin	41:38 h	7.609	(France) B. Labarre	46:39 h	6.791
2.	(France) P. Marechal	+ 6:58 m		(France) D. Alverhne	+ 1:37 h		(France) P. Asselos	+ 1:32 h	
3.	(France) P. Thibaux	407.8 km 58:41 h		(France) C. Dols	+ 3 h		(France) F. Gauze	304.6 km 48:48 h	

- 2010 did not occur
- 2011 start Paris-Colmar from 22 to 25 June.

Distance 439.3 km, women and promotion 297.7 km.

Rank	Men	Time	Pace km/h	Women	Time	Pace km/h	Promotion	Time	Pass km/h
1.	(Russia) D. Osipov	56:46:11 h	7.738	(France) D. Alverhne	38:43:50 h	7.686	(France) J.P. Meteau	40:07:38 h	7.419
2.	(France) J.M. Rouault	+ 1:01:43 h		(Russia) I. Poutintseva	+ 2:16:38 h		(France) D. Grados	+ 31:50 m	
3.	(France) G. Letessier	+ 1:50:30 h		(France) M. Labylle	+ 2:39:49 h		(France) L. Bovin	+ 1:35:12 h	

- 2012

Rank	Men	Nationality	Distance km	Time	Pace km/h	Women	Nationality	Distance km	Time	Pace km/h
1.	Dimitri Osipov	Russia	436.1	55:54:26 h	7.800	Dominique Alvernhe	France	288.9	36:33:18 h	7.903
2.	Philippe Thibaux	France	id.	+ 0:08 h		Irina Poutintseva	Russia	id.	+ 1:26:02 h	
3.	Dominique Bunel	France	id.	+ 2:10:47 h		Nicoletta Mizera	Italy	id.	+ 1:55:48 h	

- 2013

Rank	Men	Nationality	Distance km	Time	Pace km/h	Women	Nationality	Distance km	Time	Pace km/h
1.	Jean Marie Rouault	France	436.4	54:10:59 h	8.054	Irina Poutintseva	Russia	308.1	40:28:42 h	7.611
2.	Dimitry Osipov	Russia	id.	+ 48:01 h		Nicoletta Mizera	Italy	id.	+ 48:34 h	
3.	Dominique Bunel	France	id.	+ 1:05:10 h		Corinne Fauqueur	France	id.	+ 1:26:17 h	

- 2014

Rank	Men	Nationality	Distance km	Time	Pace km/h	Women	Nationality	Distance km	Time	Pace km/h
1.	Dimitri Osipov	Russia	426.4	52:45:56 h	8.081	Olga Borisova	Russia	292.4	39:11:48 h	7.460
2.	Emmanuel Lassalle	France	id.	+ 10:48 h		Maggy Labylle	France	id.	+ 21:35 h	
3.	André Duterte	France	id.	+ 4:58:32 h		Irina Poutintseva	Russia	id.	+ 59:34 h	

- 2015 start Paris-Ribeauville from 3 to 6 June
