= Lack, Poland =

Lack
- Village
- Location within Poland
- Coordinates: 51°39′N 23°27′E
- Country: Poland
- Voivodeship: Lublin
- County: Włodawa
- Gmina: Hanna
- Population: 780

Lack [lat͡sk] is a village in the administrative district of Gmina Hanna, within Włodawa County, Lublin Voivodeship, in eastern Poland, close to the border with Belarus.

In 1997, Lack had a population of 780.
