= Konstantyn, Lublin Voivodeship =

Konstantyn
- Village
- Location within Poland
- Coordinates: 51°38′N 23°26′E
- Country: Poland
- Voivodeship: Lublin
- County: Włodawa
- Gmina: Hanna

Konstantyn [kɔnsˈtantɨn] is a village in the administrative district of Gmina Hanna, within Włodawa County, Lublin Voivodeship, in eastern Poland, close to the border with Belarus.
