= Steve Hayden (athlete) =

American racewalker

Personal information
- Nationality: American
- Born: June 11, 1944 (age 82)

Sport
- Sport: Athletics
- Event: Racewalking

Steve Hayden (born June 11, 1944) is an American racewalker. He competed in the men's 50 kilometres walk at the 1972 Summer Olympics.
