= Julio Ortíz =

Guatemalan racewalker

Personal information
- Born: 18 July 1947 (age 78) Guatemala City, Guatemala

Sport
- Sport: Athletics
- Event: Racewalking

Julio Ortíz (born 18 July 1947) is a Guatemalan racewalker. He competed in the men's 20 kilometres walk at the 1968 Summer Olympics.
