= René Pfister =

Swiss racewalker

Personal information
- Nationality: Swiss
- Born: 22 May 1943 (age 83)

Sport
- Sport: Athletics
- Event: Racewalking

René Pfister (born 22 May 1943) is a Swiss racewalker. He competed in the men's 20 kilometres walk at the 1968 Summer Olympics.
