= Alfred Badel =

Swiss racewalker

Personal information
- Nationality: Swiss
- Born: 19 October 1943 (age 82)

Sport
- Sport: Athletics
- Event: Racewalking

Alfred Badel (born 19 October 1943) is a Swiss racewalker. He competed in the men's 50 kilometres walk at the 1972 Summer Olympics.
