= Roger Mills (race walker) =

English race walker (b.1948)

Personal information
- Nationality: British (English)
- Born: 11 February 1948 (age 78) Romford, Essex, England
- Height: 182 cm (6 ft 0 in)
- Weight: 74 kg (163 lb)

Sport
- Sport: Athletics
- Event: race walking
- Club: Ilford Athletic Club
Medal record
Men's athletics
Representing Great Britain
European Championships
Bronze medal – third place	1974 Rome	20 km walk

Roger George Mills (born 11 February 1948) is a male retired race walker from England who competed at the 1980 Summer Olympics.

== Biography ==
Mills became the British 3000 metres walk champion after winning the British AAA Championships title at the 1969 AAA Championships and would go on to win nine more AAA titles between 1972 and 1982, making him the most successful British 2 miles/3000 metres walker of all time. Mills also won two 10km walks at the 1973 AAA Championships and 1980 AAA Championships bringing his total to 12 AAA wins.

Mills represented Great Britain at the 1980 Olympic Games in Moscow, USSR. There he ended up in tenth place in the men's 20 km race, clocking 1:32.37,8.

He represented England in the 30 kilometres walk event, at the 1982 Commonwealth Games in Brisbane, Australia.

== Achievements ==
Year	Competition	Venue	Position	Event	Notes
Representing Great Britain and England
1974	European Championships	Rome, Italy	3rd	20 km	
1980	Olympic Games	Moscow, Soviet Union	10th	20 km	
1982	Commonwealth Games	Brisbane, Australia	7th	30 km	
1983	World Championships	Helsinki, Finland	37th	20 km	
