= William Weigle =

American racewalker

Personal information
- Nationality: American
- Born: May 25, 1940 (age 86)

Sport
- Sport: Athletics
- Event: Racewalking

William Weigle (born May 25, 1940) is an American racewalker. He competed in the men's 50 kilometres walk at the 1972 Summer Olympics.
