= Dołhobrody =

- Village
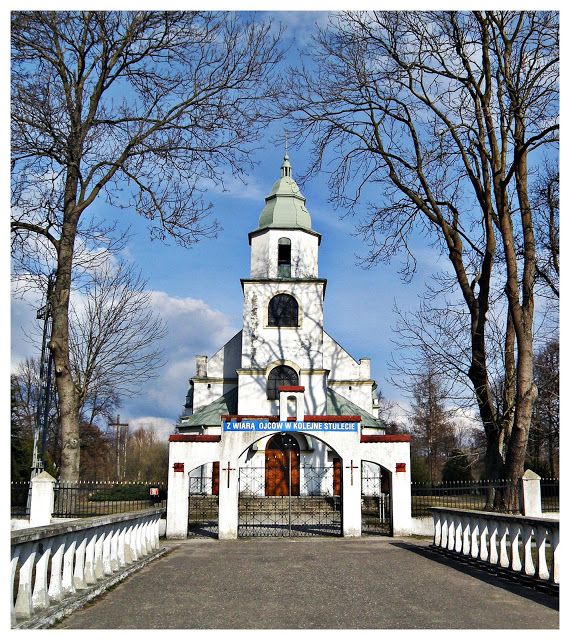
- Church of Saint Stanislaus

- Location within Poland
- Coordinates: 51°41′N 23°31′E
- Country: Poland
- Voivodeship: Lublin
- County: Włodawa
- Gmina: Hanna

Population
  - Total: 595

Dołhobrody [dɔu̯xɔˈbrɔdɨ] is a village in the administrative district of Gmina Hanna, within Włodawa County, Lublin Voivodeship, in eastern Poland, close to the border with Belarus.

The village has a population of 595 as of 2011. According to the National Census of Population and Housing 53.6% of the population are female and 46.4% male.
