= Hunde Toure =

Ethiopian racewalker

Personal information
- Nationality: Ethiopian
- Born: 1 February 1943 (age 82)

Sport
- Sport: Athletics
- Event: Racewalking

Hunde Toure (born 1 February 1943) is an Ethiopian racewalker. He competed in the men's 20 kilometres walk at the 1972 Summer Olympics and the 1980 Summer Olympics.
