= Kuzawka =

- Village
- Location within Poland
- Coordinates: 51°44′N 23°31′E
- Country: Poland
- Voivodeship: Lublin
- County: Włodawa
- Gmina: Hanna
- Population: 380

Kuzawka [kuˈzafka] is a village in the administrative district of Gmina Hanna, within Włodawa County, Lublin Voivodeship, in eastern Poland, close to the border with Belarus.
