= Kjell Georg Lund =

Norwegian race walker (born 1944)

Personal information
- Nationality: Norwegian
- Born: 23 January 1944 (age 82) Bergen, Norway

Sport
- Sport: Racewalking

Kjell Georg Lund (born 23 January 1944) is a Norwegian race walker. He was born in Bergen, Norway.

He competed at the 1972 Summer Olympics in Munich, where he placed 24th in the men's 50 kilometres walk.
