= Ole David Jensen =

Danish racewalker

Personal information
- Nationality: Danish
- Born: 16 July 1943 (age 82)

Sport
- Sport: Athletics
- Event: Racewalking

Ole David Jensen (born 16 July 1943) is a Danish racewalker. He competed in the men's 50 kilometres walk at the 1972 Summer Olympics.
