= Pat Farrelly (race walker) =

Canadian racewalker (1935–2018)

Personal information
- Full name: Patrick Oliver Farrelly
- Nationality: Canadian
- Born: 11 July 1935 Mullingar, Ireland
- Died: 24 October 2018 (aged 83) Hamilton, Ontario, Canada

Sport
- Sport: Athletics
- Event: Racewalking

Patrick Oliver Farrelly (11 July 1935 – 24 October 2018) was a Canadian racewalker. He competed in the men's 20 kilometres walk at the 1976 Summer Olympics. He died in 2018 after a long illness.
