= Roger Quemener =

French racewalker (1941–2021)

Personal information
- Nickname: Monsieur Paris-Colmar
- Born: 17 June 1941 France
- Died: 18 July 2021 (aged 81)

Sport
- Country: France
- Event(s): Racewalking, Ultramarathon
- Club: AS Police Paris (1970–1989)

Roger Quemener (17 June 1941 – 18 July 2021) was a French racewalker, who was a legend of the Ultramarathon race Paris-Colmar winning seven times. He thus had the record number of wins, until Polish racewalker Grzegorz Adam Urbanowski brought it to ten wins.

== Career ==
Of Breton descent, Quemener joined the Parisian police in 1963, and later became a member of the AS Police Paris sporting association. He only started top-level sport at 28 years old. He contested mainly long-distance races, he was French champion in the 100 kilometers in 1971, 1972 and 1975. In 1979 Quemener won the classic Paris-Strasbourg. Subsequently, he won the same race in 1983, known as Paris-Colmar since 1981, and five times consecutively from 1985 to 1989. He used to stop to get shaved before the arrival at Colmar to cross the finish line with a clean-shaven face. Later Quemener became deputy director of the competition.

== Awards ==
Golden medal of Youth and Sports - 1986
