= Ole Jensen (neuroscientist) =

Danish neuroscientist

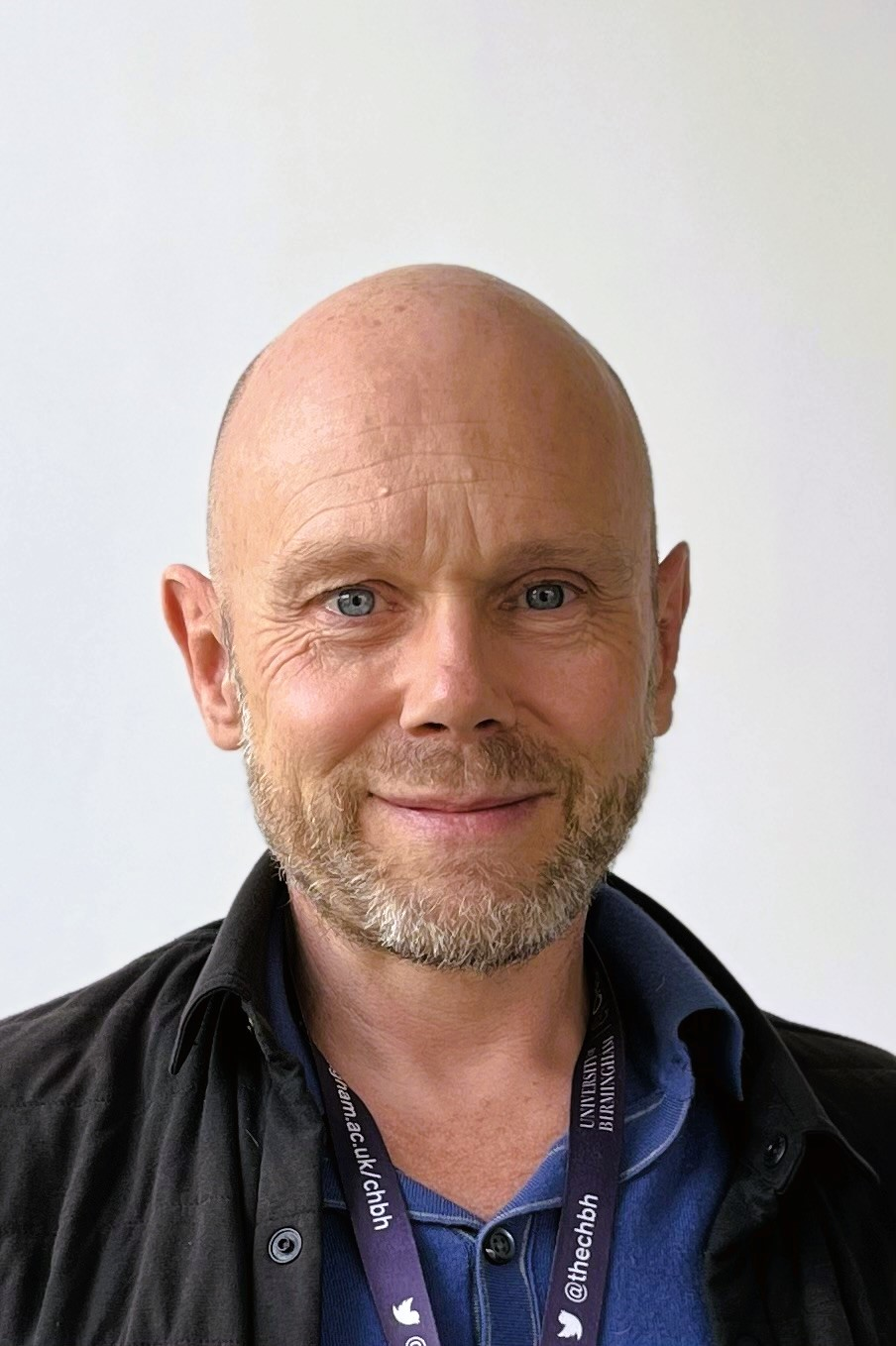
- Education: Technical University of Denmark Brandeis University
- Known for: Research work on applying magnetoencephalography to investigate the functional role of brain oscillations
- Scientific career
- Fields: Neuroscience
- Workplaces: Radboud University; University of Birmingham; Oxford University
- Thesis: Oscillatory Short-Term Memory Models (1998)
- Doctoral advisor: John E. Lisman

Ole Jensen (born 25 May 1968) is a Danish neuroscientist and the chair of Translational Cognitive Neuroscience at the University of Oxford. He is known for his research work on applying magnetoencephalography to study the functioning of human brain.

== Early life and education ==
Jensen received a Master of Science degree in electrical engineering from The Technical University of Denmark in 1993. He was the doctoral student of John E. Lisman and received a PhD degree in Neuroscience in 1998 at Brandeis University, US. In 2013, he was appointed professor at the Science Faculty of Radboud University, The Netherlands where he established a research program on magnetoencephalography (MEG) at the Donders Institute for Brain, Cognition and Behaviour. In 2016, he was appointed as professor in Translational Neuroscience at University of Birmingham, United Kingdom, where he was founding co-director of the Centre for Human Brain Health. In 2024, he moved to the University of Oxford where he was appointed statutory professor in Translational Cognitive Neuroscience.

== Research area ==
Jensen is known for his work on neuronal oscillations using computational neuroscience and magnetoencephalography. His research mainly focuses on the neuronal oscillatory dynamics supporting cognition in animals and humans. In particular, his work has addressed the role of alpha oscillations (or waves) by demonstrating that these oscillations reflect a gating by inhibition mechanism in attention, language and memory tasks. Other parts of his work has focused on understanding the coupling between slower and faster oscillations and how this kind of neuronal dynamics organize neuronal coding.

== Selected publications ==
- Jensen, Ole; Lisman, John (2013). "The Theta-Gamma Neural Code". Neuron. 77 (6): 1002–1016. doi:10.1016/j.neuron.2013.03.007. PMC 3648857. PMID 23522038.
- Jensen, Ole; Gelfanf, Jack; Kounios, John; Lisman, John (2002). "Oscillations in the alpha band (9–12 Hz) increase with memory load during retention in a short-term memory task". Cerebral Cortex. 12 (8): 877–882. doi:10.1093/cercor/12.8.877. PMID 12122036.
- Jensen, Ole; Mazaheri, Ali (2010). "Shaping Functional Architecture by Oscillatory Alpha Activity: Gating by Inhibition". Frontiers in Human Neuroscience. 4: 186. doi:10.3389/fnhum.2010.00186. ISSN 1662-5161. PMC 2990626. PMID 21119777.
- McNaughton, Bruce L.; Battaglia, Francesco P.; Jensen, Ole; Moser, Edvard I.; Moser, May-Britt (2006–2008). "Path integration and the neural basis of the 'cognitive map'". Nature Reviews Neuroscience. 7 (8): 663–678. doi:10.1038/nrn1932. ISSN 1471-0048. PMID 16858394. S2CID 16928213.
- Colgin, Laura Lee; Denninger, Tobias; Fyhn, Marianne; Hafting, Torkel; Bonnevie, Tora; Jensen, Ole; Moser, May-Britt; Moser, Edvard I. (2009–2011). "Frequency of gamma oscillations routes flow of information in the hippocampus". Nature. 462 (7271): 353–357. Bibcode:2009Natur.462..353C. doi:10.1038/nature08573. ISSN 1476-4687. PMID 19924214. S2CID 4429677.

== See also ==
- Ole Jensen publications indexed by Google Scholar
- ORCID 0000-0001-8193-8348
