= Peter Selzer =

Medal record

Men's athletics

Representing East Germany

European Championships
| Silver medal – second place | 1969 Athens | 50 km walk |
| Bronze medal – third place | 1971 Helsinki | 50 km walk |
| Bronze medal – third place | 1974 Rome | 50 km walk |

Peter Selzer (born 25 June 1946 in Torgau) is a former East German race walker.

== Achievements ==
| Year | Tournament | Venue | Result | Event |
|---|---|---|---|---|
| 1966 | European Championships | Budapest, Hungary | 11th | 50 km |
| 1967 | World Race Walking Cup | Bad Saarow, East Germany | 2nd | 50 km |
| 1968 | Olympic Games | Mexico City, Mexico | 4th | 50 km |
| 1969 | European Championships | Athens, Greece | 2nd | 50 km |
| 1971 | European Championships | Helsinki, Finland | 3rd | 50 km |
| 1972 | Olympic Games | Munich, West Germany | 5th | 50 km |
| 1974 | European Championships | Rome, Italy | 3rd | 50 km |

== Sources ==
- http://www.racewalking-naumburg.de/history.html
