= Christoph Höhne =

German racewalker and photographer

Medal record

Men's athletics

Representing East Germany

Olympic Games
Gold medal – first place	1968 Mexico City	50 km walk

European Championships
Gold medal – first place	1969 Athens	50 km walk
Gold medal – first place	1974 Rome	50 km walk
Silver medal – second place	1971 Helsinki	50 km walk

World Race Walking Cup
Gold medal – first place	1965 Pescara	50 km walk
Gold medal – first place	1967 Bad Saarow	50 km walk
Gold medal – first place	1970 Eschborn	50 km walk
Bronze medal – third place	1973 Lugano	50 km walk

Christoph Höhne (born 12 February 1941 in Borsdorf, Saxony, German Reich) is a German racewalker who competed in the 50 km walk for East Germany in the 1960s and 1970s.

== Career ==
Höhne won the gold medal in the 50 km walk at the 1968 Summer Olympics in Mexico City and participated in the Olympics in 1964 and 1972. His Olympic victory made history as his margin of victory was over ten minutes.

He participated in an episode of the Cold War in sports at the 1972 Summer Olympics in Munich. On the evening before the race, East German officials received an anonymous tip that he wanted to defect during the 50 km race. They did not believe the allegations, but Höhne went to the start line unnerved and finished in fourteenth place.

Höhne won gold in the 50 km walk at the European Championships in 1969 and 1974, and a silver in 1971.

He won the IAAF World Race Walking Cup in the 50 km walk in 1965, 1967, and 1970, and he placed third in 1973.

During his career Höhne competed for the SV Dynamo sports club and was trained by Max Weber.

== Post-career ==
After his sports career, Höhne studied photography and became a well-known sports photographer in East Germany. Among other accolades, he received a gold medal at the International Sports Photography Exhibition in Reus, Spain in 1978.

After the unification of Germany, he has done freelance photography for the daily newspapers Junge Welt and Sportecho.

== Note ==
Höhne's place of birth is reported as Machern profile (in German) or as Borsdorf (in German) both in Gau Saxony.
