= Otto Barch =

Kyrgyz racewalker (1943–2025)

Personal information
- Born: 20 December 1943 Frunze, Kirghiz SSR, Soviet Union
- Died: 23 October 2025 (aged 81)
- Height: 180 cm (5 ft 11 in)
- Weight: 75 kg (165 lb)

Sport
- Country: Soviet Union
- Sport: Race walking
- Club: Burevestnik Frunze
Medal record
Men's athletics
Representing Soviet Union
European Championships
| Silver medal – second place | 1974 Rome | 50 km walk |
World Race Walking Cup
| Silver medal – second place | 1973 Lugano | 50 km walk |

Otto Eduardovich Barch (Russian: Отто Эдуардович Барч; 20 December 1943 – 23 October 2025) was a Kyrgyz race walker who represented the Soviet Union. He competed at the 1968, 1972 and 1976 Summer Olympics. He was also a silver medalist at the 1973 IAAF World Race Walking Cup and the 1974 European Athletics Championships, in addition to being a three-time Soviet champion.

== Biography ==
Barch was born on 20 December 1943 in Frunze, Kirghiz Soviet Socialist Republic, Soviet Union. His parents were Russian-Germans. Barch graduated from the Frunze Polytechnic Institute, now known as the Kyrgyz Technical University, and was a mechanical engineer outside of sports. In 1963, at around age 19, he began participating in athletics. He became a top race walker and was trained by the coach Nikolai Zhilov. Barch was a member of the Burevestnik Sports Society, where he was coached by B. Tarasov.

He placed third in the 50 kilometres race walk at the 1968 Soviet Athletics Championships, earning him a place on the USSR national athletics team. That year, he was selected to compete at the 1968 Summer Olympics in Mexico City in the 20 kilometres walk. Barch finished in sixth place with a time of 1:36:16.8, while the winner, Volodymyr Holubnychy, had a time of 1:33:58.4. Barch won the silver medal in the 50 km race walk at the 1969, 1970, 1971, and 1972 Soviet championships. He was also a participant at the 1969 and 1971 European Athletics Championships. In 1972, he was selected to compete in the 50 km race walk at the Summer Olympics in Munich, where he placed fourth, his best Olympic finish. He recorded a time of 4:01:35.4, less than a minute behind the bronze medalist Larry Young and five minutes behind gold medalist Bernd Kannenberg.

Barch won the silver medal at the 1973 IAAF World Race Walking Cup in Lugano, behind Kannenberg. That year, he also won his first Soviet national championship, placing first in the 50 km race walk. In 1974, he won a silver medal at the Soviet championships and also finished second at the 1974 European Athletics Championships. A 10-minute documentary film on his life was produced that year by Karel Abdykulov, which won awards at film festivals in Oberhausen and Minsk.

Barch held the title of Master of Sports of the USSR, International Class. He won the Soviet championship in the 20 km race walk in 1975. The following year, he competed at his third and final Summer Olympics in Montreal, placing 13th in the 20 km race walk. He later won his last Soviet title in 1978 in the 50 km and also competed at that year's European Championships. Barch announced his retirement from sports in 1981, at the age of 38. He later moved to Germany after the fall of the Soviet Union.

Barch died on 23 October 2025, at the age of 81. (Note: Sources mislabel his age as "83".) Sport.kg said after his death that "The lasting legacy Otto Barch left in the history of Kyrgyz sports will forever remain in the people's memory."
