= Daniel Björkgren =

Swedish racewalker

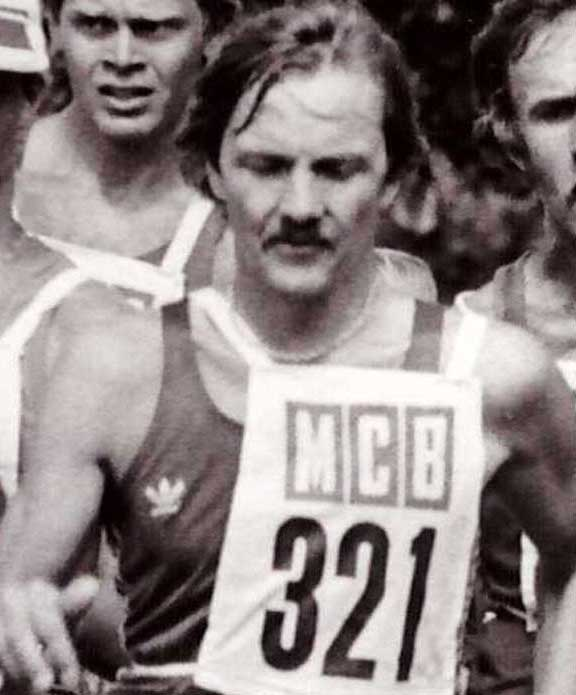

Personal information
- Nationality: Swedish
- Born: 14 September 1939 Korsholm, Finland
- Died: 16 November 1992 (aged 53) Gothenburg, Sweden

Sport
- Sport: Athletics
- Event: Racewalking
- Club: Österhaninge IF

Daniel Björkgren (14 September 1939 – 16 November 1992) was a Swedish racewalker. He finished 13th in the 50 km walk at the 1972 Summer Olympics and at the 1974 European Championships. He won a silver medal in the 20 km at the 1969 Nordic Race Walking Championships.
