= Veniamin Soldatenko =

Soviet racewalker (1939–2023)

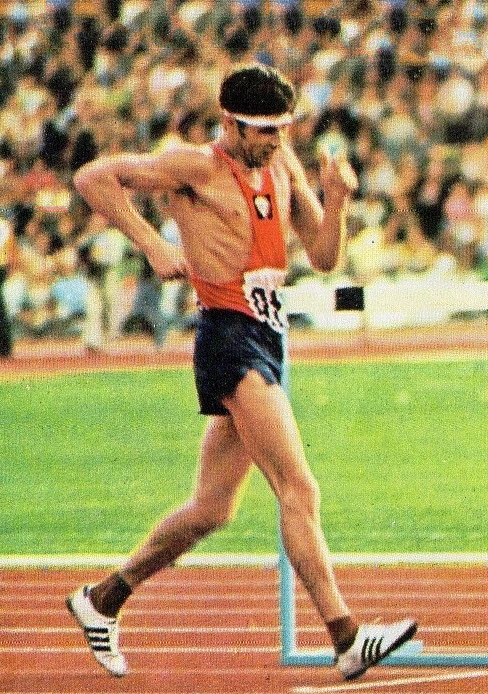
- Soldatenko in 1972

Personal information
- Born: 4 January 1939 Shkurovka, Beinetkorsky District, North Kazakhstan Region, Kazakh SSR, USSR
- Died: 15 July 2023 (aged 84)
- Height: 1.75 m (5 ft 9 in)
- Weight: 63 kg (139 lb)

Sport
- Sport: Athletics
- Event: 50 km walk
- Club: SKA Almaty

Achievements and titles
- Personal best: 3:53:24 (1978)
Medal record
Men's athletics
Representing the Soviet Union
Olympic Games
Silver medal – second place	1972 Munich	50 km walk
World Championships
Gold medal – first place	1976 Malmö	50 km walk
European Championships
Gold medal – first place	1971 Helsinki	50 km walk
Silver medal – second place	1978 Prague	50 km walk
Bronze medal – third place	1969 Athens	50 km walk

Veniamin Vasilievich Soldatenko (Russian: Вениамин Васильевич Солдатенко, 4 January 1939 – 15 July 2023) was a Soviet athlete who competed mainly in the 50 km walk. He acquired Kazakhstani citizenship after the dissolution of the Soviet Union.

Soldatenko took up athletics in 1962 and became a member of the USSR National Team in 1967. He competed at the 1972 Summer Olympics and won the silver medal. He also won a silver medal at the 1970 World Race Walking Cup, a gold medal at the 1976 World Championships and bronze, gold and silver medals at the European Championships in 1969, 1971 and 1978, respectively. Soldatenko was awarded the Order of the Badge of Honor in 1972.

Soldatenko was the first ever IAAF world champion and remains the oldest male world champion in athletics, having taken his 50 km walk title at 37 years and 258 days. In retirement he coached race walkers in his native Kazakhstan.

Soldatenko died on 15 July 2023, at the age of 84.
