= John Warhurst (athlete) =

Personal information
- Nationality: English
- Born: 1 October 1944 (age 81) Sheffield, West Riding of Yorkshire

Sport
- Club: Epsom & Ewell Harriers
Medal record
Athletics
Representing England
Commonwealth Games
Gold medal – first place	1974 Christchurch	20 miles walk

John Warhurst (born 1 October 1944 in Sheffield, West Riding of Yorkshire) is a retired male race walker from England.

== Athletics career ==
As an amateur Warhurst won the 1967 Sheffield Star Walk. Warhurst represented Great Britain at the 1972 Olympic Games, finishing 18th in the 50 km walk. He represented England and won a gold medal in the 20 miles walk event, at the 1974 British Commonwealth Games in Christchurch, New Zealand.

== International competitions ==
Year	Competition	Venue	Position	Notes
1972	Olympic Games	Munich, West Germany	18th	50 km
1974	Commonwealth Games	Christchurch, New Zealand	1st	20 ml
