= Hans-Georg Reimann =

East German race walker (1941–2026)

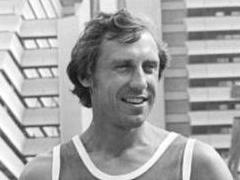

Medal record

Men's athletics

Representing East Germany

Olympic Games
Silver medal – second place	1976 Montreal	20 km walk
Bronze medal – third place	1972 Munich	20 km walk

European Championships
Silver medal – second place	1962 Belgrade	20 km walk

Hans-Georg Reimann (24 August 1941 – 20 February 2026) was an East German race walker, who started for the SC Dynamo Berlin and the GDR and won two Olympic medals in 20 km racewalking. He finished third at the 1972 Summer Olympics in Munich in (1:27:17 hours) and finished second at the 1976 Summer Olympics in Montréal in (1:25:14 hours).

== Biography ==
Reimann was born in Starrischken, Municipality Heydekrug on 24 August 1941. He won the silver medal (1:36:14.2 hours) at the 1962 European Championships. He - synchronously with Peter Frenkel - went a world record (1:25:19.4 hours). Four years later and he was flag bearer of the GDR team at the opening of the 1976 Summer Olympics.

He became first an engineer for measuring and automatic control. After the end of his sporting career he worked as a trainer for racewalkers. After the end of the GDR he became a pharmacy representative and lived in Neufahrn bei Freising. Reimann started for SC Dynamo Berlin and trained with Max Weber. In his athletic career he was 1.80 meters large and weighed 65 kg.

Reimann died in Döbeln, Saxony on 20 February 2026, at the age of 84.

== Sources ==
- https://www.leichtathletik-berlin.de/start.html – Berlin Athletics Association
