= Bob Dobson =

British race walker

Personal information
- Nationality: British (English)
- Born: 4 November 1942 London, England

Sport
- Sport: Athletics
- Event: Race walking
- Club: Basildon AC

Robert William Dobson (born 4 November 1942), is a male former athlete who competed for England.

== Biography ==
Dobson was a member of the Basildon Athletics Club.

Dobson represented the England team at the 1970 British Commonwealth Games in Edinburgh, Scotland. He competed in the men's 20 miles walk event, finishing fourth, just outside the medal rostrum.

The following year he competed in the 1971 European Athletics Championships in Helsinki where he competed in the 50 kilometres walk. He also represented Great Britain at the 1976 World Championships in Athletics in Malmö.

He was a six times winner of the British Race Walking Association Championships, three at 35 Km and three at 50 Km.
