= José Esteban Valle =

Nicaraguan athlete

Personal information
- Born: 5 September 1942 Ciudad Darío, Nicaragua
- Died: 27 December 2004 (aged 62) Reno, Nevada, U.S.

Sport
- Sport: Athletics
- Event: Racewalking

José Esteban Valle (5 September 1942 – 27 December 2004) was a Nicaraguan racewalker. He competed in the men's 20 kilometres walk at the 1968 Summer Olympics and the 1972 Summer Olympics.
