= Peter Frenkel =

East German athlete (born 1939)

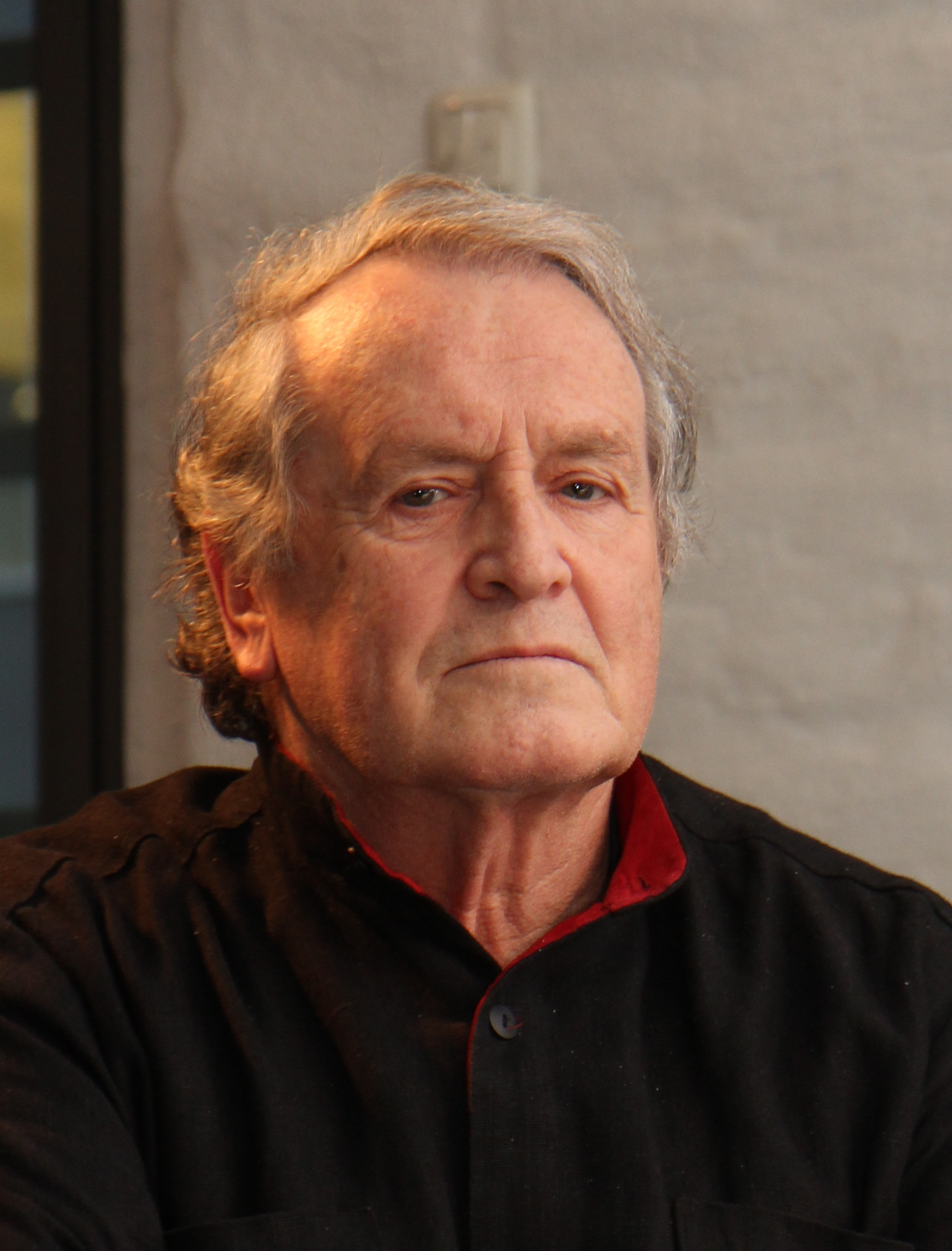
- Peter Frenkel at the book presentation for the book The German question. Olympic controversies in the 1960s at the German Sports and Olympic Museum in 2018

Medal record

Men's athletics

Representing East Germany

Olympic Games
Gold medal – first place	1972 Munich	20 kilometre walk
Bronze medal – third place	1976 Montreal	20 kilometre walk

Peter Frenkel (born 13 May 1939 in Eckartsberga) is an East German athlete who was one of the best 20 km race walkers in the world in the late 1960s and early 1970s.

== Biography ==
He won the gold medal for East Germany in the Munich Olympics of 1972 in the 20 kilometre walk, in a time of 1:26:43. He defended his title at the 1976 Olympics held in Montreal, Canada, finishing in third place. He first competed in the Olympics at the 1968 Summer Olympics in Mexico City, where he finished in tenth place, with a time of 1:37:21. He came fourth at the 1971 European Championships in a time of 1:27:52.8. He had retired early from the sport by the time of the 1974 European Championships.

He used a decompression chamber belonging to the state airline Interflug in training for the 1972 Olympics, so as to simulate the effects of altitude training. He set two World Records during his racing career, the first in 1970 (1:25:50), the second in 1972 (1:25:19.4) equalling Hans-Georg Reimann's record.

He served in the East German Army while training, rising to the rank of Major. After finishing his racing career, he became a well-known photographer in East Germany. He was vice-president of the Union of German Olympians (Gemeinschaft Deutscher Olympiateilnehmer, or GDO) from 1991 to 1998. He then became a press officer for OSC Potsdam athletic club. He raced for the ASK Vorwärts Potsdam club (the army sports club). He was coached by Wilhelm Kustak until 1968, and then by Hans-Joachim Pathus. In his racing years he was 1.82 m (6 ft 0 in) tall, and weighed 76 kg (168 lb).
