= Bernd Kannenberg =

German racewalker

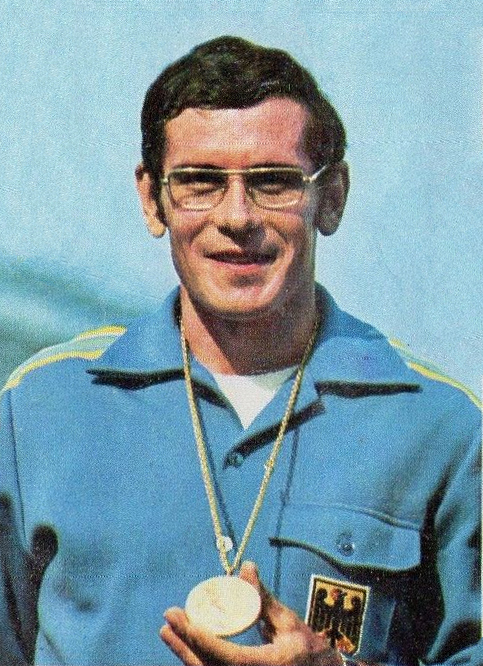
- Bernd Kannenberg in 1972

Personal information
- Born: 20 August 1942 Königsberg, East Prussia, Nazi Germany
- Died: 13 January 2021 (aged 78) Münster, Germany
- Height: 1.76 m (5 ft 9 in)
- Weight: 75 kg (165 lb)

Sport
- Sport: Athletics
- Event: Race walking
- Club: TV 1860 Fürth; LAC Quelle Fürth

Achievements and titles
- Personal bests: 20 km – 1:24:45 (1974); 50 km – 3:52:45 (1972)
Medal record
Men's athletics
Representing West Germany
Olympic Games
Gold medal – first place	1972 Munich	50 km walk
European Championships
Silver medal – second place	1974 Rome	20 km walk

Bernhard "Bernd" Kannenberg (20 August 1942 – 13 January 2021) was a West German race walker who won the 50 km event at the 1972 Summer Olympics. He also competed in the 20 km at the 1972 and 1976 Games, but failed to finish. In 1972 Kannenberg became the first German athlete to walk 50 km within four hours; the same year he was awarded the Silbernes Lorbeerblatt. During his career he set five world records, and won six outdoor and four indoor West German titles.

Kannenberg was a professional soldier and trained at the sports school of the German Bundeswehr at Warendorf. After retiring from competitions, he coached the German race walking team.

Kannenberg was born in Koenigsberg (Eastern Prussia, from 1945, Kaliningrad). With his grandma and cousin he was aboard the evacuation ship "Wilhelm Gustloff", when it was torpedoed by a Russian submarine. He and his cousin were among the few survivors, while his grandma died. In 1955, he emigrated with his family from East Germany to West Germany.

Records
Preceded by (Soviet Union) Gennadiy Agapov	Men's 50km Walk World Record Holder; 27 May 1972 – 23 April 1978	Succeeded by (Mexico) Raúl González
