= Örjan Andersson =

Swedish racewalker

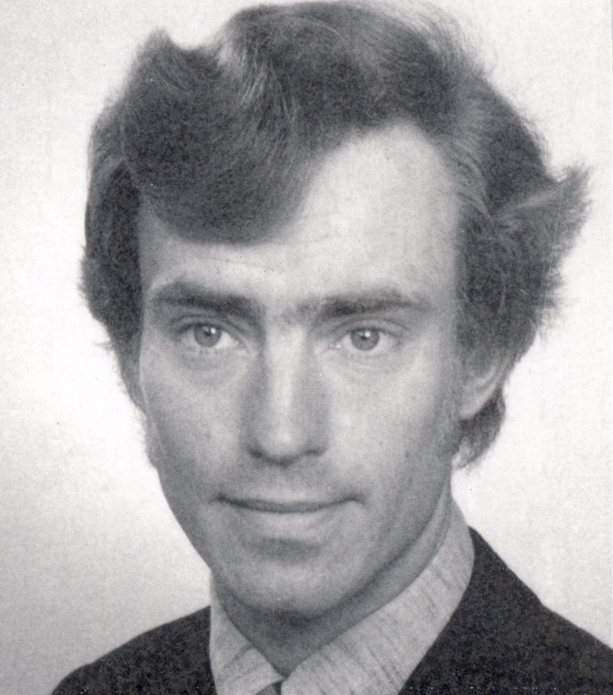

Personal information
- Born: 1 May 1943 (age 83) Motala, Sweden
- Height: 176 cm (5 ft 9 in)
- Weight: 62 kg (137 lb)

Sport
- Sport: Athletics
- Event: Race walking
- Club: Södertälje IF

Achievements and titles
- Personal best(s): 20 kmW – 1:33:25 (1972); 50 kmW – 4:11:01 (1968)

Stig Örjan Andersson (born 1 May 1943) is a retired Swedish race walker. He took part in the 20 km and 50 km events at the 1968 Summer Olympics, and placed 21st and 13th, respectively. He continued competing at the European and world level in the 1970s, but with little success.
