= Jan Ornoch =

Polish racewalker

Personal information
- Nationality: Polish
- Born: 30 May 1952 Kuzawka, Poland
- Died: Poland

Sport
- Event: Race walking
Medal record
Men's athletics
Representing Poland
European Championships
Bronze medal – third place	1978 Prague	50 km walk

Jan Ornoch (born 30 May 1952 in Kuzawka) is a retired male race walker from Poland. He is the younger brother of Eugeniusz Ornoch and uncle of Mariusz Ornoch.

== Achievements ==
Year	Competition	Venue	Position	Event	Notes
Representing Poland
1972	Olympic Games	Munich, West Germany	7th	20 km	
1974	European Championships	Rome, Italy	5th	20 km	
1976	Olympic Games	Montreal, Canada	17th	20 km	
1978	European Championships	Prague, Czechoslovakia	3rd	20 km	3:55:15.9
