= Stefan Ingvarsson =

Swedish racewalker

Personal information
- Nationality: Swedish
- Born: 14 December 1946
- Died: 4 March 2017 (aged 70)

Sport
- Sport: Athletics
- Event: Racewalking

Stefan Ingvarsson (14 December 1946 – 4 March 2017) was a Swedish racewalker. He competed at the 1968 Summer Olympics and the 1972 Summer Olympics.
