= Athletics at the 1936 Summer Olympics – Men's 50 kilometres walk =

Men's 50 kilometres walk at the Games of the XI Olympiad
- Venue: Olympiastadion: Berlin, Germany
- Dates: August 5, 1936
- Competitors: 33 from 16 nations
- Winning time: 4:30:41.4 OR

Medalists
1st place, gold medalist(s)		Harold Whitlock; Great Britain
2nd place, silver medalist(s)		Arthur Tell Schwab; Switzerland
3rd place, bronze medalist(s)		Adalberts Bubenko; Latvia

The men's 50 kilometres walk event at the 1936 Summer Olympic Games took place on August 5. The final was won by Harold Whitlock of Great Britain.

== Results ==
Rank	Name	Nationality	Time	Notes
1st place, gold medalist(s)	Harold Whitlock	Great Britain	4:30:41.4	OR
2nd place, silver medalist(s)	Arthur Tell Schwab	Switzerland	4:32:09.2	
3rd place, bronze medalist(s)	Adalberts Bubenko	Latvia	4:32:42.2	
4	Jaroslav Štork	Czechoslovakia	4:34:00.2	
5	Edgar Bruun	Norway	4:34:53.2	
6	Fritz Bleiweiß	Germany	4:36:48.4	
7	Karl Reiniger	Switzerland	4:40:45.0	
8	Étienne Laisné	France	4:41:40.0	
9	Teodor Bieregowoj	Poland	4:42:49.0	
10	Anton Toscani	Netherlands	4:42:59.4	
11	Evald Segerström	Sweden	4:43:30.4	
12	Ettore Rivolta	Italy	4:48:47.0	
13	Adrien Courtois	France	4:49:07.0	
14	Giuseppe Gobbato	Italy	4:49:51.0	
15	Adolf Aebersold	Switzerland	4:51:14.0	
16	Herbert Dill	Germany	4:51:26.0	
17	Tebbs Lloyd Johnson	Great Britain	4:54:56.0	
18	Mario Brignoli	Italy	4:58:12.0	
19	Ryoji Naraoka	Japan	5:07:15.0	
20	Vasile Firea	Romania	5:09:39.0	
21	Albert Mangan	United States	5:12:00.2	
22	Cai Tsungyi	Republic of China	5:16:02.4	
23	Ernest Koehler	United States	5:20:18.2	
24	Zhou Yuyu	Republic of China	5:25:01.0	
25	Chang Chanchiu	Republic of China	5:26:54.2	
26	Ernest Crosbie	United States	5:31:44.2	
	Jānis Dāliņš	Latvia		DNF
	Joe Hopkins	Great Britain		DNF
	Ejner Bech	Denmark		DNF
	Arnolds Krūkliņš	Latvia		DSQ
	Dick Löf	Sweden		DSQ
	Friedrich Prehn	Germany		DSQ
	Gösta Grandin	Sweden		DSQ

Key: DNF = Did not finish, DSQ = Disqualified, OR = Olympic record
