= 1938 European Athletics Championships – Men's 50 kilometres walk =

Men's 50 kilometres walk at the European Athletics Championships

The men's 50 kilometres race walk at the 1938 European Athletics Championships was held in Paris, France, on 4 September 1938.

== Medalists ==
Gold	Harold Whitlock; Great Britain
Silver	Herbert Dill; Germany
Bronze	Edgar Bruun; Norway

== Results ==
=== Final ===
4 September

Rank	Name	Nationality	Time	Notes
1st place, gold medalist(s)	Harold Whitlock	Great Britain	4:41:51	CR
2nd place, silver medalist(s)	Herbert Dill	Germany	4:43:54	
3rd place, bronze medalist(s)	Edgar Bruun	Norway	4:44:35	
4	Fritz Bleiweiss	Germany	4:45:24	
5	Antonio De Maestri	Italy	4:53:56	
6	Evald Segerström	Sweden	4:54:06	
7	Giuseppe Gobbato	Italy	4:56:20	
8	Anton Toscani	Netherlands	4:58:36	
9	Vasile Firea	Romania	5:22:31	
	Jaroslav Štork	Czechoslovakia	DNF	
	Frank Bentley	Great Britain	DNF	
	Sune Carlsson	Sweden	DNF	
	Jānis Daliņš	Latvia	DNF	
	Thierry Mathot	Belgium	DNF	
	Louis Cambrai	France	DQ	
	Pierre Bussières	France	DQ	

== Participation ==
According to an unofficial count, 16 athletes from 11 countries participated in the event.

- Belgium (1)
- Czechoslovakia (1)
- France (2)
- Germany (2)
- Italy (2)
- Latvia (1)
- Netherlands (1)
- Norway (1)
- Romania (1)
- Sweden (2)
- Great Britain (2)
