= Athletics at the 1948 Summer Olympics – Men's 50 kilometres walk =

Men's 50 kilometres walk at the Games of the XIV Olympiad
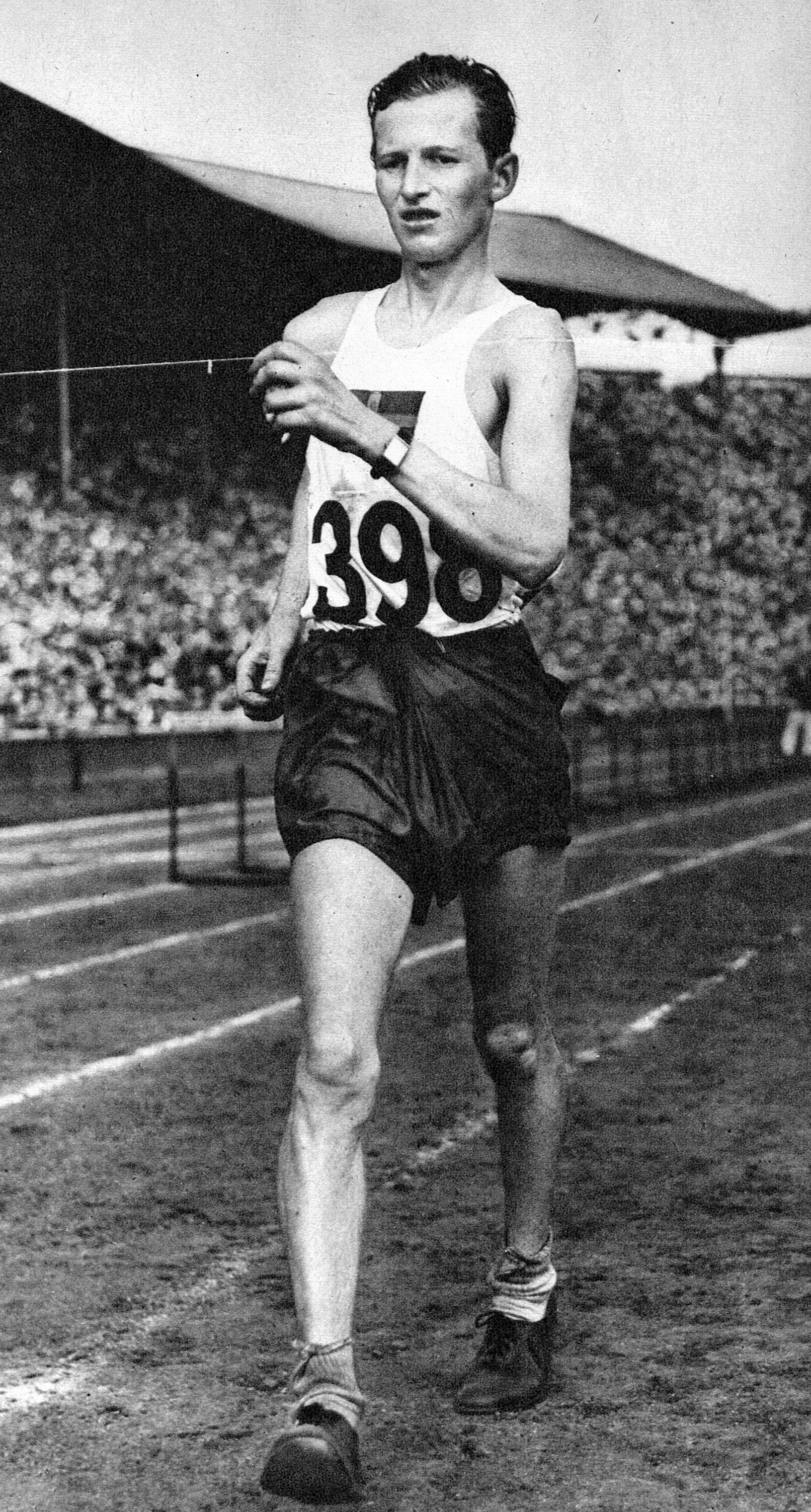
- John Ljunggren 1948
- Venue: Empire Stadium
- Dates: July 31, 1948 (final)
- Competitors: 23 from 11 nations
- Winning time: 4:41:52

Medalists
1st place, gold medalist(s)		John Ljunggren; Sweden
2nd place, silver medalist(s)		Gaston Godel; Switzerland
3rd place, bronze medalist(s)		Tebbs Lloyd Johnson; Great Britain

The men's 50 kilometres walk event at the 1948 Summer Olympic Games took place July 31. The final was won by Swede John Ljunggren.

== Records ==
Prior to the competition, the existing Olympic record was as follows.

Olympic record	Harold Whitlock (GBR)	4:30:41.4	Berlin, Germany	5 August 1936

== Schedule ==
All times are British Summer Time (UTC+1)

Date	Time	Round
Saturday, 31 July 1948	13:15	Final

== Results ==
Rank	Name	Nationality	Time	Notes
1st place, gold medalist(s)	John Ljunggren	Sweden	4:41:52	
2nd place, silver medalist(s)	Gaston Godel	Switzerland	4:48:17	
3rd place, bronze medalist(s)	Tebbs Lloyd Johnson	Great Britain	4:48:31	
4	Edgar Bruun	Norway	4:53:18	
5	Herbert Martineau	Great Britain	4:53:58	
6	Rune Bjurström	Sweden	4:56:43	
7	Pierre Mazille	France	5:01:40	
8	Claude Hubert	France	5:03:12	
9	Enrique Villaplana	Spain	5:03:31	
10	Tage Jönsson	Sweden	5:05:08	
11	Henri Caron	France	5:08:15	
12	Ernest Crosbie	United States	5:15:16	
13	Sándor László	Hungary	5:16:30	
14	Salvatore Cascino	Italy	5:20:03	
15	John Deni	United States	5:28:33	
16	Adolf Weinacker	United States	5:30:14	
	Francesco Pretti	Italy		DNF
	Rex Whitlock	Great Britain		DNF
	Gerhard Winther	Norway		DNF
	Per Olav Baarnaas	Norway		DNF
	Sadhu Singh	India		DNF
	Sixto Ibánez	Argentina		DNF
	Valentino Bertolini	Italy		DNF

Key: DNF = Did not finish

== Sources ==
- Organising Committee for the XIV Olympiad, The (1948). "The Official Report of the Organising Committee for the XIV Olympiad" (PDF). LA84 Foundation. Archived from the original (PDF) on September 27, 2013.
