= Athletics at the 1932 Summer Olympics – Men's 50 kilometres walk =

Men's 50 kilometres walk at the Games of the X Olympiad
- Venue: Los Angeles Memorial Coliseum
- Dates: August 3, 1932 (final)
- Competitors: 15 from 10 nations
- Winning time: 4:50:10 OR

Medalists
1st place, gold medalist(s)		Tommy Green; Great Britain
2nd place, silver medalist(s)		Jānis Daliņš; Latvia
3rd place, bronze medalist(s)		Ugo Frigerio; Italy

The men's 50 kilometres walk event at the 1932 Summer Olympic Games took place August 3. The final was won by Tommy Green of Great Britain.

== Results ==
Rank	Name	Nationality	Time (hand)	Notes
1st place, gold medalist(s)	Tommy Green	Great Britain	4:50:10	OR
2nd place, silver medalist(s)	Jānis Daliņš	Latvia	4:57:20	
3rd place, bronze medalist(s)	Ugo Frigerio	Italy	4:59:06	
4	Karl Hähnel	Germany	5:06:06	
5	Ettore Rivolta	Italy	5:07:39	
6	Paul Sievert	Germany	5:16:41	
7	Henri Quintric	France	5:27:25	
8	Ernest Crosbie	United States	5:28:02	
9	Bill Chisholm	United States	5:51:00	
10	Alfred Maasik	Estonia	6:19:00	
	Henry Cieman	Canada		DNF
	John Moralis	Greece		DNF
	Francesco Pretti	Italy		DNF
	Arthur Tell Schwab	Switzerland		DNF
	Harry Hinkel	United States		DNF

Key: DNF = Did not finish, OR = Olympic record
