= Poděbrady Walking =

Annual racewalking competition in Poděbrady, Czech Republic

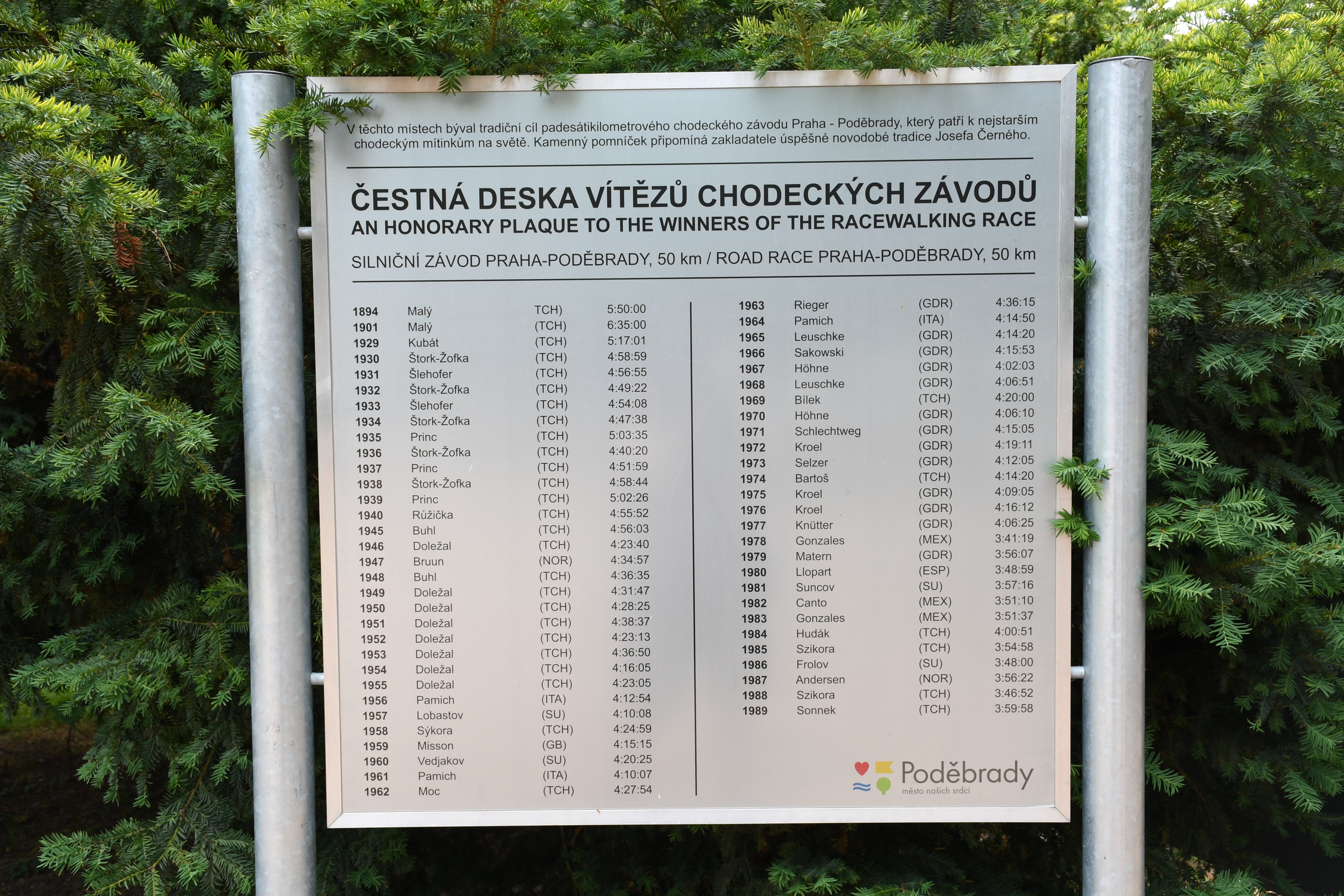
- A list of winners of the Poděbrady Walking from 1894 to 1989
- Location: Poděbrady, Czech Republic
- Event type: Racewalking
- World Athletics Cat.: A (World Athletics Race Walking Tour Gold)
- Distance: 50 km walk (1894–2002); 10 km walk (1990–2000); 20 km walk (2001–present)
- Established: 1894

The Poděbrady Walking is an annual racewalking competition held in Poděbrady, Czech Republic. As of 2024, it is a World Athletics Race Walking Tour Gold level meeting – the highest-level circuit of international race walking competitions.

The meeting is organized by the Czech Athletics Federation, and it is typically held in April.

== History ==
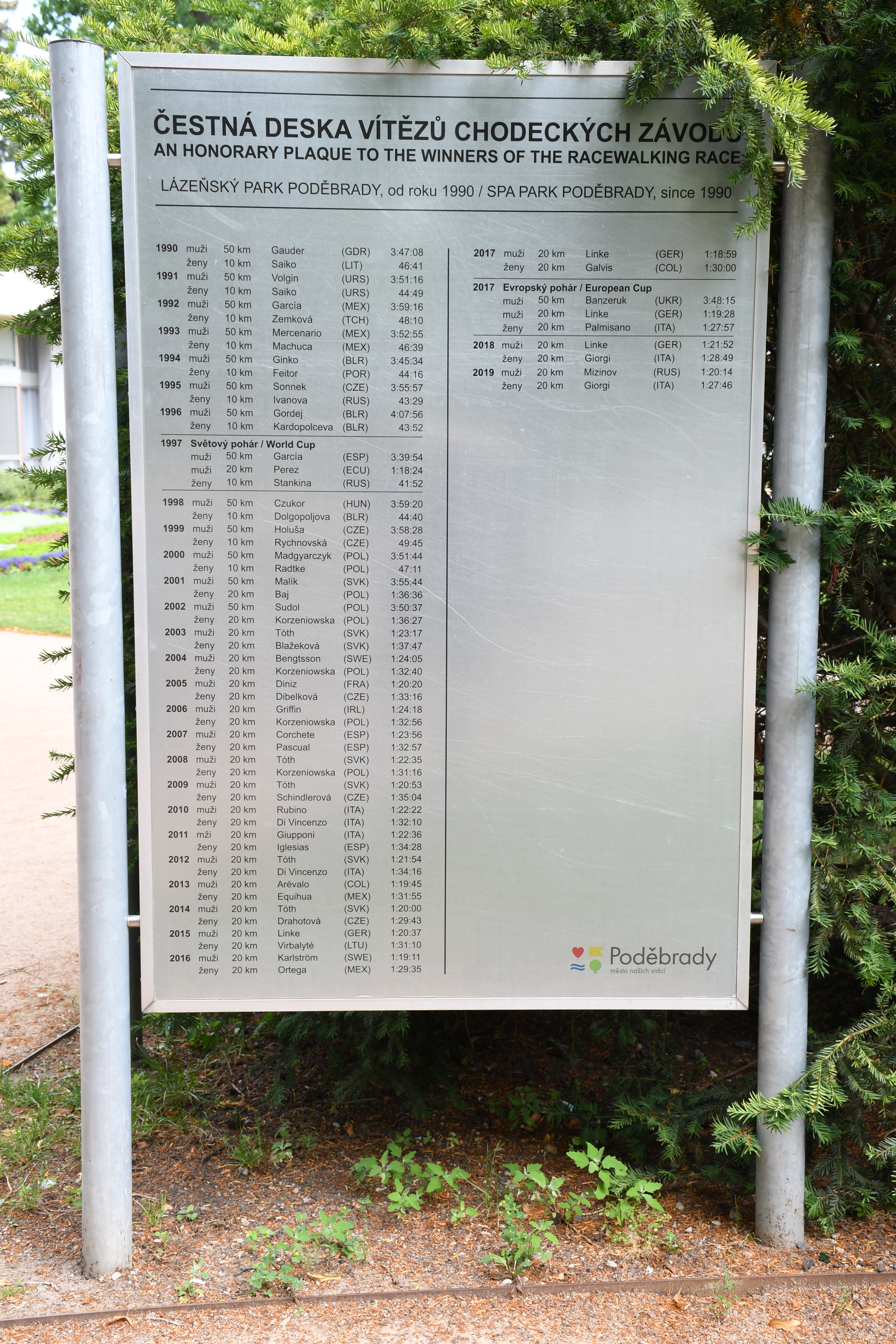
List of winners from 1990 to 2019

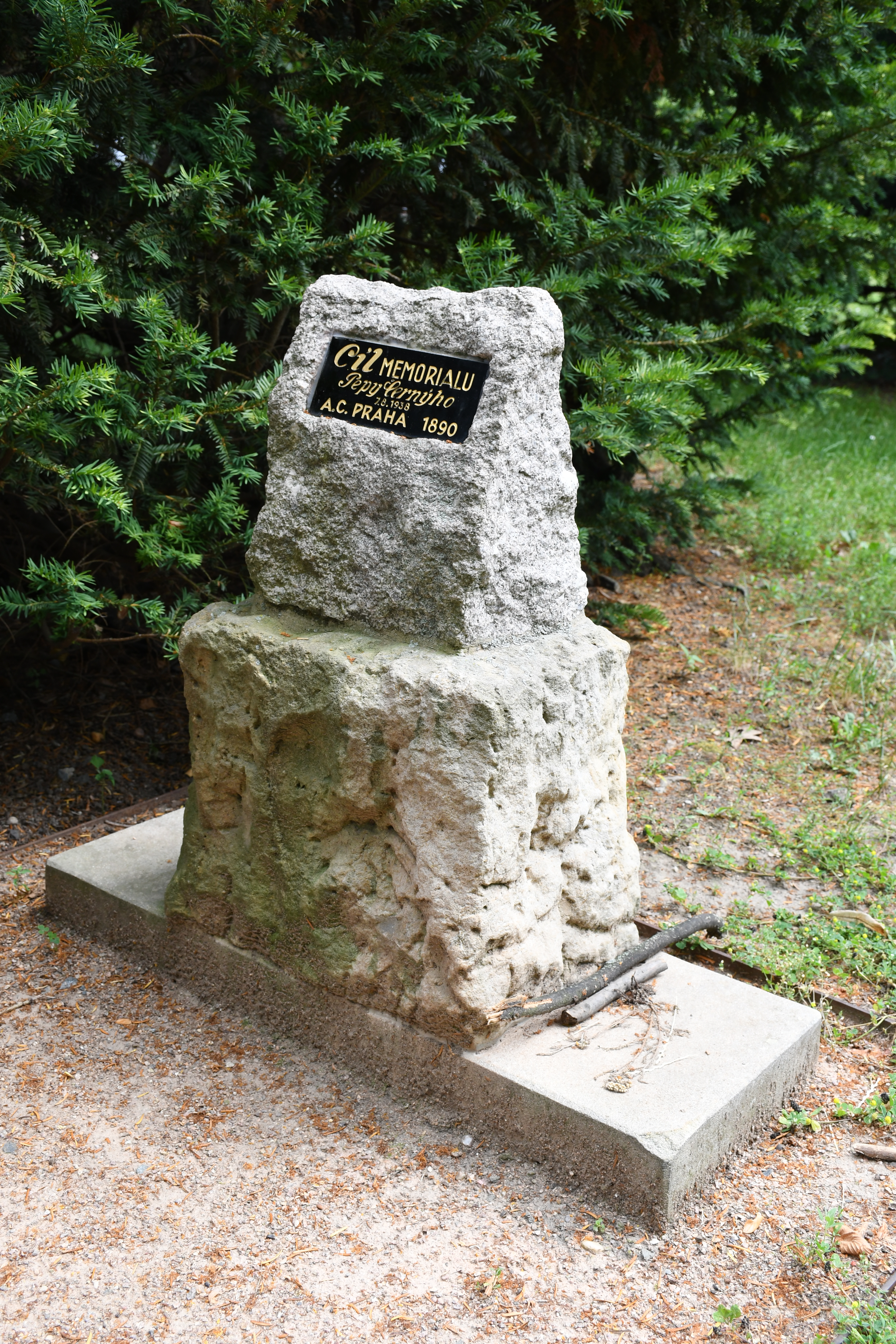
Memorial to Pepa Černý, who organized the race since 1929

The first Poděbrady Walking was held in 1894, hosted by the Královské Vinohrady Pedestrian Club and borne out of pedestrianism two years before the first Modern Olympic Games. It was held over the 50 kilometres race walk distance, from Karlín to Poděbrady. After the first two editions, the race was organized by Pepa Černý starting in 1929. With the exception of four years during World War II, the race has been held on an annual basis since then.

The race began to attract international participation in 1947. The first women's race was added in 1990, originally over the 10 kilometres race walk distance while the men still walked 50 km. In 1991, the course was changed to 50 times around a 1 km road lap in Spa Park to be compliant with new IAAF world record regulations and due to car traffic on the old course's roads. It would not be until 2001 that the women's race distance was increased to 20 km, and from 2003 to the present both men's and women's races were held over the 20 km distance. The course has played host to several international championships, beginning with the 1997 IAAF World Race Walking Cup, and more recently the 2017 European Race Walking Cup, 2021 European Race Walking Team Championships, and 2023 European Race Walking Team Championships.

== Winners ==
Poděbrady Walking senior race winners
| Ed. | Date | Men | | | | Women | | | | R |
| Ed. | Date | 20 km walk / HM walk | | 50 km walk / 35 km walk | | 10 km walk / 20 km walk / HM walk | | 35 km walk | | R |
|---|---|---|---|---|---|---|---|---|---|---|
| 1st | 1894 | —N/a | | František Malý (TCH) | **5h50m** | —N/a | | —N/a | | |
| 2nd | 4 Aug 1901 | —N/a | | František Malý (TCH) | 6h35m | —N/a | | —N/a | | |
| 3rd | 25 Aug 1929 | —N/a | | Emanuel Kubát (TCH) | **5:17:01** | —N/a | | —N/a | | |
| 4th | 24 Aug 1930 | —N/a | | Jaroslav Štork-Žofka (TCH) | **4:58:49** | —N/a | | —N/a | | |
| 5th | 30 Aug 1931 | —N/a | | Josef Šlehofer (TCH) | **4:56:55** | —N/a | | —N/a | | |
| 6th | 1932 | —N/a | | Jaroslav Štork-Žofka (TCH) | **4:49:22** | —N/a | | —N/a | | |
| 7th | 30 Jul 1933 | —N/a | | Josef Šlehofer (TCH) | 4:54:08 | —N/a | | —N/a | | |
| 8th | 29 Jul 1934 | —N/a | | Jaroslav Štork-Žofka (TCH) | **4:47:38** | —N/a | | —N/a | | |
| 9th | 28 Jul 1935 | —N/a | | Frantisek Princ (TCH) | 5:03:35 | —N/a | | —N/a | | |
| 10th | 23 Aug 1936 | —N/a | | Jaroslav Štork-Žofka (TCH) | **4:40:20** | —N/a | | —N/a | | |
| 11th | 1937 | —N/a | | Frantisek Princ (TCH) | 4:51:59 | —N/a | | —N/a | | |
| 12th | 1938 | —N/a | | Jaroslav Štork-Žofka (TCH) | 4:58:44 | —N/a | | —N/a | | |
| 13th | 1939 | —N/a | | Frantisek Princ (TCH) | 5:02:26 | —N/a | | —N/a | | |
| 14th | 11 Aug 1940 | —N/a | | Vaclav Růžička (TCH) | 4:55:52 | —N/a | | —N/a | | |
| 15th | 5 Aug 1945 | —N/a | | Otakar Buhl (TCH) | 4:56:03 | —N/a | | —N/a | | |
| 16th | 4 Aug 1946 | —N/a | | Josef Doležal (TCH) | **4:23:40** | —N/a | | —N/a | | |
| 17th | 3 Aug 1947 | —N/a | | Edgar Bruun (NOR) | 4:34:57 | —N/a | | —N/a | | |
| 18th | 1948 | —N/a | | Otakar Buhl (TCH) | 4:36:35 | —N/a | | —N/a | | |
| 19th | 7 Aug 1949 | —N/a | | Josef Doležal (TCH) | 4:31:47 | —N/a | | —N/a | | |
| 20th | 6 Aug 1950 | —N/a | | Josef Doležal (TCH) | 4:28:25 | —N/a | | —N/a | | |
| 21st | 12 Aug 1951 | —N/a | | Josef Doležal (TCH) | 4:38:37 | —N/a | | —N/a | | |
| 22nd | 24 Aug 1952 | —N/a | | Josef Doležal (TCH) | **4:23:13** | —N/a | | —N/a | | |
| 23rd | 30 Aug 1953 | —N/a | | Josef Doležal (TCH) | 4:36:50 | —N/a | | —N/a | | |
| 24th | 12 Sep 1954 | —N/a | | Josef Doležal (TCH) | **4:16:05** | —N/a | | —N/a | | |
| 25th | 1955 | —N/a | | Josef Doležal (TCH) | 4:23:05 | —N/a | | —N/a | | |
| 26th | 1956 | —N/a | | Abdon Pamich (ITA) | **4:12:54** | —N/a | | —N/a | | |
| 27th | 6 Oct 1957 | —N/a | | Sergey Lobastov (URS) | **4:10:08.2** | —N/a | | —N/a | | |
| 28th | 12 Oct 1958 | —N/a | | Svätopluk Sýkora (TCH) | 4:24:59.4 | —N/a | | —N/a | | |
| 29th | 16 Aug 1959 | —N/a | | Tom Misson (GBR) | 4:15:15 | —N/a | | —N/a | | |
| 30th | 19 Jun 1960 | —N/a | | Anatolyi Vedyakov (URS) | 4:20:25 | —N/a | | —N/a | | |
| 31st | 13 Aug 1961 | —N/a | | Abdon Pamich (ITA) | **4:10:07** | —N/a | | —N/a | | |
| 32nd | 2 Sep 1962 | —N/a | | Ladislav Moc (TCH) | 4:27:54 | —N/a | | —N/a | | |
| 33rd | 4 Aug 1963 | —N/a | | Gunther Rieger (GDR) | 4:36:15 | —N/a | | —N/a | | |
| 34th | 2 Aug 1964 | —N/a | | Abdon Pamich (ITA) | 4:14:50 | —N/a | | —N/a | | |
| 35th | 8 Aug 1965 | —N/a | | Burkhard Leuschke (GDR) | 4:14:20 | —N/a | | —N/a | | |
| 36th | 31 Jul 1966 | —N/a | | Kurt Sakowski (GDR) | 4:15:53 | —N/a | | —N/a | | |
| 37th | 6 Aug 1967 | —N/a | | Christoph Höhne (GDR) | **4:02:03** | —N/a | | —N/a | | |
| 38th | 4 Aug 1968 | —N/a | | Burkhard Leuschke (GDR) | 4:06:51 | —N/a | | —N/a | | |
| 39th | 3 Aug 1969 | —N/a | | Alexander Bílek (TCH) | 4:20:00 | —N/a | | —N/a | | |
| 40th | 2 Aug 1970 | —N/a | | Christoph Höhne (GDR) | 4:06:10 | —N/a | | —N/a | | |
| 41st | 18 Jul 1971 | —N/a | | Joachim Schlechtweg (GDR) | 4:15:05 | —N/a | | —N/a | | |
| 42nd | 16 Jul 1972 | —N/a | | Mathias Kroel (GDR) | 4:19:11 | —N/a | | —N/a | | |
| 43rd | 15 Jul 1973 | —N/a | | Peter Selzer (GDR) | 4:12:05 | —N/a | | —N/a | | |
| 44th | 14 Jul 1974 | —N/a | | Milan Bartoš (TCH) | 4:14:20 | —N/a | | —N/a | | |
| 45th | 13 Jul 1975 | —N/a | | Mathias Kroel (GDR) | 4:16:12 | —N/a | | —N/a | | |
| 46th | 18 Jul 1976 | —N/a | | Mathias Kroel (GDR) | 4:16:12 | —N/a | | —N/a | | |
| 47th | 10 Jul 1977 | —N/a | | Ralf Knütter (GDR) | 4:06:25 | —N/a | | —N/a | | |
| 48th | 11 Jun 1978 | —N/a | | Raúl González (MEX) | **3:41:19** | —N/a | | —N/a | | |
| 49th | 16 Jun 1979 | —N/a | | Horst Joachim Matern (GDR) | 3:56:07 | —N/a | | —N/a | | |
| 50th | 1 Jun 1980 | —N/a | | Jorge Llopart (ESP) | 3:48:59 | —N/a | | —N/a | | |
| 51st | 13 Jun 1981 | —N/a | | Valeryi Suntsov (URS) | 3:57:16 | —N/a | | —N/a | | |
| 52nd | 12 Jun 1982 | —N/a | | Ernesto Canto (MEX) | 3:51:10 | —N/a | | —N/a | | |
| 53rd | 8 May 1983 | —N/a | | Raúl González (MEX) | 3:51:37 | —N/a | | —N/a | | |
| 54th | 3 Jun 1984 | —N/a | | Jozef Hudák (TCH) | 4:00:51 | —N/a | | —N/a | | |
| 55th | 11 May 1985 | —N/a | | Pavol Szikora (TCH) | 3:54:58 | —N/a | | —N/a | | |
| 56th | 1 Jun 1986 | —N/a | | Nikolay Frolov (URS) | 3:48:00 | —N/a | | —N/a | | |
| 57th | 11 Oct 1987 | —N/a | | Erling Andersen (NOR) | 3:56:22 | —N/a | | —N/a | | |
| 58th | 5 Jun 1988 | —N/a | | Pavol Szikora (TCH) | 3:46:52 | —N/a | | —N/a | | |
| 59th | 3 Sep 1989 | —N/a | | Hubert Sonnek (TCH) | 3:59:58 | —N/a | | —N/a | | |
| 60th | 16 Jun 1990 | —N/a | | Hartwig Gauder (GDR) | 3:47:08 | Yelena Saiko (LIT) | **46:41** | —N/a | | |
| 61st | 16 Jun 1990 | —N/a | | Hartwig Gauder (GDR) | 3:47:08 | Yelena Saiko (LIT) | **46:41** | —N/a | | |
| 62nd | 28 Sep 1991 | —N/a | | Aleksey Volgin (URS) | 3:51:16 | Yelena Saiko (URS) | **44:49** | —N/a | | |
| 63rd | 1992 | —N/a | | Daniel García (MEX) | 3:59:16 | Zuzana Zemková (TCH) | 48:10 | —N/a | | |
| 64th | 1993 | —N/a | | Carlos Mercenario (MEX) | 3:52:55 | Eva Machuca (MEX) | 46:39 | —N/a | | |
| 65th | 23 Apr 1994 | —N/a | | Viktor Ginko (BLR) | 3:52:55 | Susana Feitor (POR) | 44:16 | —N/a | | |
| 66th | 1995 | —N/a | | Hubert Sonnek (CZE) | 3:55:57 | Ivanova (RUS) | **43:29** | —N/a | | |
| 67th | 1996 | —N/a | | Gordej (BLR) | 4:07:56 | Olga Kardopolceva (BLR) | 43:52 | —N/a | | |
| 68th | 19-20 Apr 1997 | Jefferson Pérez (ECU) | **1:18:24** | Jesús Ángel García (ESP) | **3:39:54** | Irina Stankina (RUS) | **41:52** | —N/a | | |
| 69th | 29 Mar 1998 | —N/a | | Zoltán Czukor (HUN) | 3:59:20 | Lyudmila Dolgopoljova (BLR) | 44:40 | —N/a | | |
| 70th | 1999 | —N/a | | Miloš Holuša (CZE) | 3:58:28 | Ludmila Rychnovská (CZE) | 49:45 | —N/a | | |
| 71st | 2000 | —N/a | | Roman Madgyarczyk (POL) | 3:51:44 | Katarzyna Radtke (POL) | 47:11 | —N/a | | |
| 72nd | 1 Apr 2001 | —N/a | | Stefan Malik (SVK) | 3:55:44 | Joanne Baj (POL) | 1:36:36 | —N/a | | |
| 73rd | 25 May 2002 | —N/a | | Grzegorz Sudol (POL) | 3:50:37 | Sylwia Korzeniowska (POL) | 1:36:27 | —N/a | | |
| 74th | 5 Apr 2003 | Matej Tóth (SVK) | 1:23:17 | —N/a | | Zuzana Blažeková (SVK) | 1:37:47 | —N/a | | |
| 75th | 27 Mar 2004 | Bengt Bengtsson (SWE) | 1:24:05 | —N/a | | Sylwia Korzeniowska (POL) | 1:32:40 | —N/a | | |
| 76th | 9 Apr 2005 | Yohann Diniz (FRA) | 1:20:20 | —N/a | | Barbora Dibelková (CZE) | 1:33:16 | —N/a | | |
| 77th | 8 Apr 2006 | Colin Griffin (IRL) | 1:24:18 | —N/a | | Sylwia Korzeniowska (POL) | 1:32:56 | —N/a | | |
| 78th | 14 Apr 2007 | Luís Manuel Corchete (ESP) | 1:23:56 | —N/a | | Beatriz Pascual (ESP) | 1:32:57 | —N/a | | |
| 79th | 12 Apr 2008 | Matej Tóth (SVK) | 1:22:35 | —N/a | | Sylwia Korzeniowska (POL) | 1:31:16 | —N/a | | |
| 80th | 25 Apr 2009 | Matej Tóth (SVK) | 1:20:53 | —N/a | | Zuzana Schindlerová (CZE) | 1:35:04 | —N/a | | |
| 81st | 10 Apr 2010 | Giorgio Rubino (ITA) | 1:22:22 | —N/a | | Sibilla Di Vincenzo (ITA) | 1:32:10 | —N/a | | |
| 82nd | 9 Apr 2011 | Matteo Giupponi (ITA) | 1:22:36 | —N/a | | Eva María Iglesias (ESP) | 1:34:28 | —N/a | | |
| 83rd | 21 Apr 2012 | Matej Tóth (SVK) | 1:21:54 | —N/a | | Sibilla Di Vincenzo (ITA) | 1:34:16 | —N/a | | |
| 84th | 13 Apr 2013 | Éider Arévalo (COL) | 1:19:45 **AU23R** | —N/a | | Monica Equihua (MEX) | 1:31:55 | —N/a | | |
| 85th | 12 Apr 2014 | Matej Tóth (SVK) | 1:20:00 | —N/a | | Anežka Drahotová (CZE) | 1:29:43 | —N/a | | |
| 86th | 11 Apr 2015 | Christopher Linke (GER) | 1:20:37 | —N/a | | Brigita Virbalyté (LTU) | 1:31:10 | —N/a | | |
| 87th | 9 Apr 2016 | Perseus Karlström (SWE) | 1:19:11 | —N/a | | Alejandra Ortega (MEX) | 1:29:35 | —N/a | | |
| 88th | 8 Apr 2017 | Christopher Linke (GER) | 1:18:59 | —N/a | | Sandra Galvis (COL) | 1:30:00 | —N/a | | |
| 89th | 21 May 2017 | Christopher Linke (GER) | 1:19:28 | Ivan Banzeruk (UKR) | 3:48:15 | Antonella Palmisano (ITA) | 1:27:57 | —N/a | | |
| 90th | 7 Apr 2018 | Christopher Linke (GER) | 1:21:52 | —N/a | | Eleonora Anna Giorgi (ITA) | 1:28:49 | —N/a | | |
| 91st | 6 Apr 2019 | Vasiliy Mizinov (RUS) | 1:20:14 | —N/a | | Eleonora Anna Giorgi (ITA) | 1:27:46 | —N/a | | |
| 92nd | 10 Oct 2020 | Perseus Karlström (SWE) | 1:19:43 | —N/a | | Antonella Palmisano (ITA) | 1:28:40 | —N/a | | |
| 93rd | 16 May 2021 | Perseus Karlström (SWE) | 1:18:54 | Marc Tur (ESP) | 3:47:40 | Antonella Palmisano (ITA) | 1:27:42 | Antigoni Drisbioti (GRE) | 2:49:55 | |
| 94th | 2 Apr 2022 | Caio Bonfim (BRA) | 1:18:54 | —N/a | | Valeria Ortuño (MEX) | 1:29:25 | —N/a | | |
| 95th | 21 May 2023 | Francesco Fortunato (ITA) | 1:18:59 | Alvaro Martin (ESP) | 3:25:35 | Antigoni Drisbioti (GRE) | 1:29:17 | Maria Perez (ESP) | 2:37:15 | |
| 96th | 6 Apr 2024 | Perseus Karlström (SWE) | 1:18:22 | —N/a | | Kimberly García (PER) | 1:27:08 | —N/a | | |
| 97th | 18 May 2025 | Paul McGrath (ESP) | **1:18:05** | Massimo Stano (ITA) | 3:20:43**WR** | Lyudmila Olyanovska (UKR) | 1:27:56 | Maria Perez (ESP) | 2:38:59 | |
| 98th | 8 May 2026 | Francesco Fortunato (ITA) | 1:23:00 | —N/a | | Kimberly García (PER) | 1:31:44 | —N/a | | |

Bold indicates meeting record

Key: 20KM distance Half Marathon distance
