= Reiniger (surname) =

Reiniger (German for "cleaner") is a German surname. Notable people with the surname include:

- Alice-Maria Reiniger (born 1945), Brazilian television journalist
- Joe Reiniger (born 1970), American soccer player and coach
- Karl Reiniger (1910–1995), Swiss racewalker
- Lotte Reiniger (1899–1981), German animated film director and producer
- Otto Reiniger (1863–1909), German landscape painter
- Scott Reiniger (born 1948), American actor
- Rike Reiniger (born 1966), German author
