= 1934 European Athletics Championships – Men's 50 kilometres walk =

Men's 50km race walk: 1934 Turin, Italy

Men's 50 kilometres walk at the European Athletics Championships

The men's 50 kilometres race walk at the 1934 European Athletics Championships was held in Turin, Italy, on 8 September 1934.

== Medalists ==
Gold	Jānis Daliņš; Latvia
Silver	Arthur Tell Schwab; Switzerland
Bronze	Ettore Rivolta; Italy

== Results ==
=== Final ===
8 September

Rank	Name	Nationality	Time	Notes
1st place, gold medalist(s)	Jānis Daliņš	Latvia	4:49:52.6	CR
2nd place, silver medalist(s)	Arthur Tell Schwab	Switzerland	4:53:08.6	
3rd place, bronze medalist(s)	Ettore Rivolta	Italy	4:54:05.4	
4	Mario Brignoli	Italy	5:01:52.8	
5	Étienne Laisné	France	5:08:40.6	
6	Hjalmar Ruotsalainen	Finland	5:40:12.8	
	Fritz Bleiweiss	Germany	DNF	
	William Schnitt	Germany	DNF	

== Participation ==
According to an unofficial count, 8 athletes from 6 countries participated in the event.

- Finland (1)
- France (1)
- Germany (2)
- Italy (2)
- Latvia (1)
- Switzerland (1)
