= Naraoka =

Naraoka (written: 奈良岡) is a Japanese surname. Notable people with the surname include:

- Kodai Naraoka (奈良岡 功大, born 2001), Japanese badminton player
- Ryoji Naraoka (奈良岡 良二, 1908–1992), Japanese racewalker
- Tomoko Naraoka (奈良岡 朋子, born 1929), Japanese actress
