= Laisné =

Laisné is a surname of Belgian origin, a variant of Lainé. Notable people with the surname include:

- Charles Laisné, French architect of Gap Cathedral and other works
- Étienne Laisné (1905–1997), French racewalker
- Jeanne Laisné (born 1456), French heroine better known as Jeanne Hachette
- Jeanne Laisné (soprano) (born 1879), French opera singer
- Kinnie Laisné (born 1989), French tennis player
