= Men's 50 kilometres walk world record progression =

The following table shows the world record progression in the men's 50 kilometres walk, as recognised by the IAAF.

== World record progression ==
Time	Athlete	Date	Place
4:40:15	Hermann Müller (GER)	1921-09-07	Munich, Germany
4:36:22	Karl Hähnel (GER)	1924-09-24	Berlin, Germany
4:34:03	Paul Sievert (GER)	1924-10-05	Munich, Germany
4:30:22	Romano Vecchietti (ITA)	1928-09-16	Rome, Italy
4:26:41	Edgar Bruun (NOR)	1936-06-28	Oslo, Norway
4:24:47	Viggo Ingvorsen (DEN)	1941-08-17	Odense, Denmark
4:23:40	Josef Doležal (TCH)	1946-08-04	Poděbrady, Czechoslovakia
4:23:14	Josef Doležal (TCH)	1952-08-24	Poděbrady, Czechoslovakia
4:20:30	Vladimir Ukhov (URS)	1952-08-29	Leningrad, Soviet Union
4:16:06	Josef Doležal (TCH)	1954-09-12	Poděbrady, Czechoslovakia
4:07:29	Anatoliy Yegorov (URS)	1955-11-17	Tbilisi, Soviet Union
4:05:13	Grigory Klimov (URS)	1956-08-10	Moscow, Soviet Union
4:03:53	Anatoly Vedyakov (URS)	1959-08-13	Moscow, Soviet Union
4:03:02	Abdon Pamich (ITA)	1960-10-16	Ponte San Pietro, Italy
4:01:39	Grigory Klimov (URS)	1961-08-17	Leningrad, Soviet Union
4:00:50	Mikhail Lavrov (URS)	1961-09-05	Kazan, Soviet Union
3:55:36	Gennadiy Agapov (URS)	1965-10-17	Alma Ata, Soviet Union
3:52:45	Bernd Kannenberg (FRG)	1972-05-27	Bremen, West Germany
3:45:52	Raúl González (MEX)	1978-04-23	Mixhuca, Mexico
3:41:20	Raúl González (MEX)	1978-06-11	Poděbrady, Czechoslovakia
3:40:46	Josep Marín (ESP)	1983-03-13	Valencia, Spain
3:38:31	Ronald Weigel (GDR)	1984-07-20	Berlin, East Germany
3:38:17	Ronald Weigel (GDR)	1986-05-25	Potsdam, East Germany
3:37:41	Andrey Perlov (URS)	1989-08-05	Leningrad, Soviet Union
3:37:26	Valeriy Spitsyn (RUS)	2000-05-21	Moscow, Russia
3:36:39	Robert Korzeniowski (POL)	2002-08-08	Munich, Germany
3:36:03	Robert Korzeniowski (POL)	2003-08-27	Paris, France
3:35:47	Nathan Deakes (AUS)	2006-12-02	Geelong, Australia
3:34:14	Denis Nizhegorodov (RUS)	2008-05-11	Cheboksary, Russia
3:32:33	Yohann Diniz (FRA)	2014-08-15	Zürich, Switzerland

== Note ==
The 3:35:29 by Russia's Denis Nizhegorodov set in Cheboksary on June 13, 2004 was not ratified by the IAAF as a World Record because no EPO test was carried out afterwards.

== See also ==
- Women's 50 kilometres walk world record progression
