= Guaraciaba =

Guaraciaba may refer to the following municipalities in Brazil:

- Guaraciaba, Minas Gerais, in the state of Minas Gerais
- Guaraciaba, Santa Catarina, in the state of Santa Catarina
