= Tommy Green (athlete) =

British racewalker

Personal information
- Nationality: British (English)
- Born: 30 March 1894 Fareham, England
- Died: 29 March 1975 (aged 80) Eastleigh, England

Sport
- Sport: Athletics
- Event: racewalking
- Club: Belgrave Harriers
Medal record
Men's athletics
Representing Great Britain
Gold medal – first place	1932 Los Angeles	50 kilometre walk

Thomas William Green (30 March 1894 – 29 March 1975) was a British racewalker who won a gold medal in the men's 50 km walk at the 1932 Summer Olympics. The son of a police constable, Green could not walk until the age of five, owing to his affliction with rickets. He lied about his age and joined the British Army in 1906 and served during the First World War, where he was wounded on three occasions and gassed while fighting in France. Returning to Britain, he eventually settled in Eastleigh where he worked at a railway works before being encouraged by a blind friend to take up racewalking.

Green's career began to rise during the late 1920s and reached its peak during the 1930s, when he became the first British national and Olympic 50 km racewalking champion. He continued his success through the mid-1930s, but placed fourth at the 1936 National Championships and was thus unable to compete in that year's Summer Olympic Games. He retired from competitive athletics and had a career as a publican prior to spending his retirement as a sports promoter and administrator. Tommy Green Walk in Eastleigh is named in his honour.

== Early life ==
Green was born in the town of Fareham in Hampshire, England on 30 March 1894. His family was Anglican and his father, Tom, was a police constable. The younger Green was afflicted with rickets as a child and thus unable to walk until he was five years old. He left school at the age of 12 and briefly worked as a butcher's assistant before lying about his age and joining the 20th Hussars of the British Army in 1906. He was invalided four years later after a horse fell on him, but recalled up to service at the onset of the First World War. He fought in France with the 3rd The King's Own Hussars where he was wounded three times and gassed so severely that the army sent him back to Britain in 1917.

== Athletic career ==
Green settled in the town of Eastleigh where he held numerous jobs until finally finding more stable employment with Eastleigh Railway Works, a repair facility for trains and carriages. He also trained as a boxer and long-distance runner in his spare time until he was encouraged by a blind friend to take up the sport of racewalking. He entered – and won – his first race at the age of 32 in 1926 and soon thereafter joined the Belgrave Harriers. His breakthrough year was 1929, winning several national competitions and coming in second at an international 100 km event in Milan.

Green's prominence grew in 1930 as he set a new world record while becoming Britain's first national 50 km racewalking champion in July. After a string of victories in other British events, he captured his first international title at the international 100 km race in Milan. His continuing success through 1931 and 1932 earned him a trip to the 1932 Summer Olympics in Los Angeles, where he won a gold medal in the first ever men's 50 km walk at the Games. At the time he was 38 years old and he remains, as of 2008, the oldest person to have won the event. He contested fewer races in 1933 and 1934, but he set his sights on making an appearance at the 1936 Summer Olympics in Berlin and resumed his heavy regimen of training in 1935. He was runner-up to Harold Whitlock for the British 50 km title that year, but he slid to fourth place in the following year's competition and was not selected for the Berlin Games. Whitlock, who captured the 1936 National Championship with a world record time, became the eventual winner of the 1936 Olympic 50 km walk.

== Later life ==
Green retired from competitive athletics after 1936 and, having lost a thumb in an industrial accident at Eastleigh Railway Works in 1934, took up a career as a publican. He did participate in a Victory Walk following the Second World War where, at the age of 53, he finished 17th in a field of 146 competitors. His final race came in 1946, where he was victorious in an event that stretched from Poole to Wareham in Dorset. In retirement he dedicated the remainder of his life to promoting sports and served as President of the Eastleigh Cricket Association. He died on 29 March 1975 in Eastleigh, where Tommy Green Walk was named in his honour.
