= Firea =

Firea is a Romanian surname. Notable people with the surname include:

- Gabriela Firea (born 1972), Romanian journalist and politician
- Vasile Firea (1908–1991), Romanian racewalker
- Victor Firea (1923–2007), Romanian runner
