= Hermann Müller (race walker) =

German racewalker (1885–1947)

Medal record

Men's athletics

Representing Germany

Intercalated Games
| Silver medal – second place | 1906 Athens | 3000 metre walk |

Hermann Müller (18 April 1885 in Berlin – January 21, 1947 in Berlin) was a German athlete who won the silver medal in the 3000 metre walk at the 1906 Intercalated Games held in Athens, Greece.

Records
| Preceded by Incumbent | Men's 20km Walk World Record Holder; October 4, 1911 – July 13, 1913 | Succeeded by (France) Emile Anthoine |
| Preceded by Incumbent | Men's 50km Walk World Record Holder; September 7, 1921 – September 24, 1924 | Succeeded by (Germany) Karl Hähnel |
