= Bjurström =

Bjurström or Bjurstrøm is a Nordic surname. Bjurström is the Swedish spelling, and Bjurstrøm is the Norwegian and Danish spelling.

== Meaning ==
Bjurström is an ornamental or topographic name, derived from bjur (meaning beaver) and ström (meaning river).

== Prevalence ==
This surname is most prevalent in Sweden, followed by the United States and Norway.

== Notable people ==
Notable people with this surname include:

- Augusta Bjurström, founder of the Hammarstedtska skolan
- Hanne Bjurstrøm (born 1960), Norwegian politician
- Jonas Bjurström (born 1979), Swedish footballer
- Mait Bjurström (born 1963), Swedish curler
- Marco Bjurström (born 1966), Finnish dancer
- Olof Bjurström (1917–1989), Swedish diplomat
- Rune Bjurström (1912–1996), Swedish racewalker
