= Ettore Rivolta =

Italian racewalker (1904–1977)

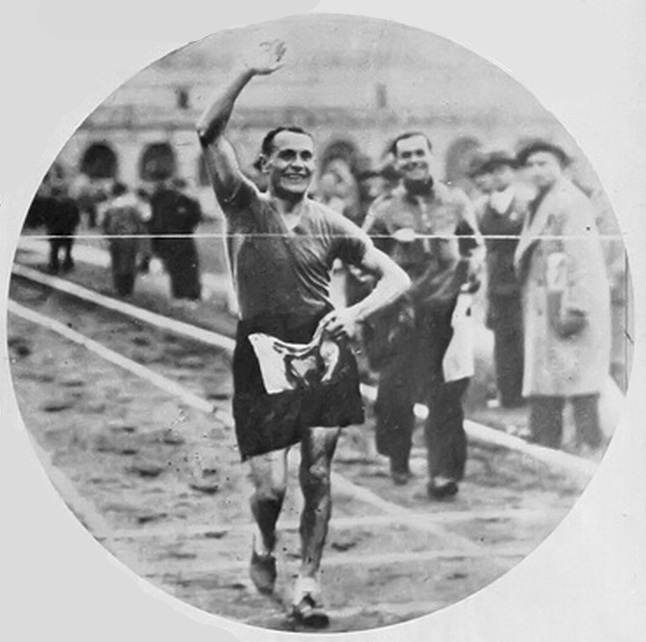

Personal information
- Nationality: Italian
- Born: 3 September 1904 Milan, Kingdom of Italy
- Died: 17 October 1977 (aged 73)
- Height: 1.74 m (5 ft 9 in)
- Weight: 68 kg (150 lb)

Sport
- Country: Italy
- Sport: Athletics
- Event: Race walk
Medal record
Men's athletics
Representing Italy
European Championships
Bronze medal – third place	1934 Turin	50 km walk

Ettore Rivolta (3 September 1904 – 17 October 1977) was an Italian racewalker who competed at two editions of Olympic Games: 1932 Summer Olympics and 1936 Summer Olympics.

== Biography ==
Rivolta was the bronze medalist in the 50 km race walk at the 1934 European Athletics Championships held in Turin. He also won the national championships at senior level five.

== Achievements ==
Year	Competition	Venue	Position	Event	Time	Notes
1932	Olympic Games	(United States) Los Angeles	5th	50 km walk	5:07:39	
1934	European Championships	(Italy) Turin	3rd	50 km walk	4:54:05	
1936	Olympic Games	(Germany) Berlin	12th	50 km walk	4:48:47	

== National titles ==
- Italian Athletics Championships
  - 50 km walk: road: 1931, 1934, 1935, 1936, 1939
