= Tage Jönsson =

Swedish racewalker

Personal information
- Nationality: Swedish
- Born: 10 June 1920
- Died: 22 August 2001 (aged 81)

Sport
- Sport: Athletics
- Event: Racewalking

Tage Jönsson (10 June 1920 – 22 August 2001) was a Swedish racewalker. He competed in the men's 50 kilometres walk at the 1948 Summer Olympics.
