= Chang Chanchiu =

Chinese racewalker

Personal information
- Nationality: Chinese
- Born: 7 April 1914

Sport
- Sport: Athletics
- Event: Racewalking

Chang Chanchiu (born 7 January 1914, date of death unknown) was a Chinese racewalker. He competed in the men's 50 kilometres walk at the 1936 Summer Olympics.
