= Zhou Yuyu =

Chinese racewalker (1911–1994)

Personal information
- Nationality: Chinese
- Born: 23 April 1911 Shanghai, China
- Died: 1994 (aged 82–83)

Sport
- Sport: Athletics
- Event: Racewalking

Zhou Yuyu (23 April 1911 – 1994) was a Chinese racewalker. He competed in the men's 50 kilometres walk at the 1936 Summer Olympics.
