= Teodor Bieregowoj =

Polish racewalker

Personal information
- Nationality: Polish
- Born: 16 March 1908 Lublin, Congress Poland
- Died: 1 January 1986 (aged 77) Gdynia, Polish People's Republic

Sport
- Sport: Athletics
- Event: Racewalking

Teodor Bieregowoj (16 March 1908 – 1 January 1986) was a Polish racewalker. He competed in the men's 50 kilometres walk at the 1936 Summer Olympics.

Bieregowoj served in the Polish resistance movement during the Second World War.
