= Ludwig Lachner =

German footballer (1910–2003)

Personal information
- Date of birth: 27 July 1910
- Place of birth: Munich, Germany
- Date of death: 19 May 2003 (aged 92)
- Place of death: Munich, Germany
- Positions: Midfielder; forward

Senior career*
Years	Team	Apps	(Gls)
–1929	FT Gern		
1929–1934	1860 Munich		
1934–1949	Eintracht Braunschweig		
1949–	MTV Braunschweig		

International career
1930–1934	Germany	8	(4)

Managerial career
- 1949–: MTV Braunschweig (player-manager)
- 1954–1955: VfL Wolfsburg
- 1957: VfL Wolfsburg
- 1958–1963: VfV Hildesheim
- 1963–1966: VfL Wolfsburg
- * Club domestic league appearances and goals

Ludwig "Pipin" Lachner (27 July 1910 – 19 May 2003) was a German footballer and manager.

== Club career ==
Lachner began his career at the Munich-based worker's football club FT Gern in the Arbeiter-Turn- und Sportbund championship. He switched to 1860 Munich in 1929. In 1934 Lachner left Munich and joined Eintracht Braunschweig, where he played for the next 15 years. After retiring from top-level football in 1949, Lachner continued for a time as player-manager at MTV Braunschweig in the Amateuroberliga Niedersachsen.

During the 1950s and 60s, Lachner also worked as a football manager, including three stints at VfL Wolfsburg.

== International career ==
Lachner was capped eight times for the Germany national team, scoring four goals.

== Career statistics ==
Scores and results table. Germany's goal tally first:

#	Date	Venue	Opponent	Score	Result	Competition
1.	28 September 1930	Ostragehege, Dresden, Germany	Hungary	4–3	5–3	Friendly
2.	19 March 1933	Deutsches Stadion, Berlin, Germany	France	3–1	3–3	Friendly
3.	19 November 1933	Letzigrund, Zurich, Switzerland	Switzerland	2–0	2–0	Friendly
4.	14 January 1934	Waldstadion, Frankfurt, Germany	Hungary	1–0	3–1	Friendly

== Honours ==
- German championship runner-up: 1931
