= MTV Braunschweig =

German sports club

- Full name: Braunschweiger Männer-Turnverein von 1847
- Founded: 1847
- League: 3. Handball-Liga (III)
- 2015–16: 1st (Oberliga, promoted)
- Club colours
Home	Away

Braunschweiger MTV von 1847, commonly known as MTV Braunschweig, is a German sports club based in Braunschweig, Lower Saxony.

== History ==
MTV Braunschweig was founded as a gymnastics club in 1847 and is the second oldest sports club in Lower Saxony. Like many clubs within the German Turner movement, MTV Braunschweig was initially committed to the national unification of Germany and the goals of the German revolution of 1848.

Originally only open to men, women were allowed to join the club first in 1888. Today MTV is a multi-sports club with departments for association football, athletics, basketball, field hockey, team handball, swimming, table tennis, tennis, volleyball, and others. MTV Braunschweig has been successful in German sports, with the club's athletes having won over 50 national championships in various sports.

== Athletics ==
MTV's athletes compete, together with athletes from other Braunschweig-based clubs such as Eintracht Braunschweig, under the name LG Braunschweig.

== Team handball ==
MTV's team handball team has traditionally been among the club's most successful. In 1987 MTV was promoted to the 2. Handball-Bundesliga, the second tier of professional handball in Germany. The stint was a short one, and MTV was relegated again in 1989. After several years in the lower regional divisions, the club was promoted to the 3. Handball-Liga (III) in 2016.

== Football ==
MTV's football team was most successful during the years directly after World War II. In 1945 the former first division side Leu Braunschweig was merged into the club. Between 1949 and 1954 MTV Braunschweig then played in the Amateuroberliga Niedersachsen, the second tier of football in Germany at the time. The merger was dissolved in 1954, and the refounded club SC Leu Braunschweig took MTV's place in the league. Since then MTV's football team has mostly played in the lower tiers of regional amateur football.

=== Honours ===
- Landesliga Niedersachsen, Staffel Braunschweig (II):
  - Champions (1): 1948

== Basketball ==
In 1978 the club's basketball section entered into a cooperation with FT Braunschweig to form SG Braunschweig, the predecessor of Basketball Bundesliga team Basketball Löwen Braunschweig.

=== Honours ===
- BBL-Pokal :
  - Runners-up 1990–91

== Notable members ==
- Fritz Bleiweiß, Olympic racewalker
- Michael Green, Olympic field hockey player
- Wolfgang Grobe, footballer, youth player at MTV
- Karen Haude, field hockey player
- August Hermann, physical education pioneer
- René Herms, Olympic middle-distance runner
- Ludwig Lachner, former German international footballer, player-manager at MTV
- Hans-Günther Lehmann, Olympic swimmer
- Edmund Malecki, former German international footballer, player and player-manager at MTV
- Jürgen Moll, footballer, youth player at MTV
- Volker Mudrow, German international handballer
- Melanie Paschke, Olympic sprinter
- Walter Ramme, Olympic swimmer
- Alfred Schwarzmann, Olympic gymnast
- Fate Tola, long-distance runner
- Luminita Zaituc, Olympic long-distance runner
