= Adrien Courtois =

French racewalker

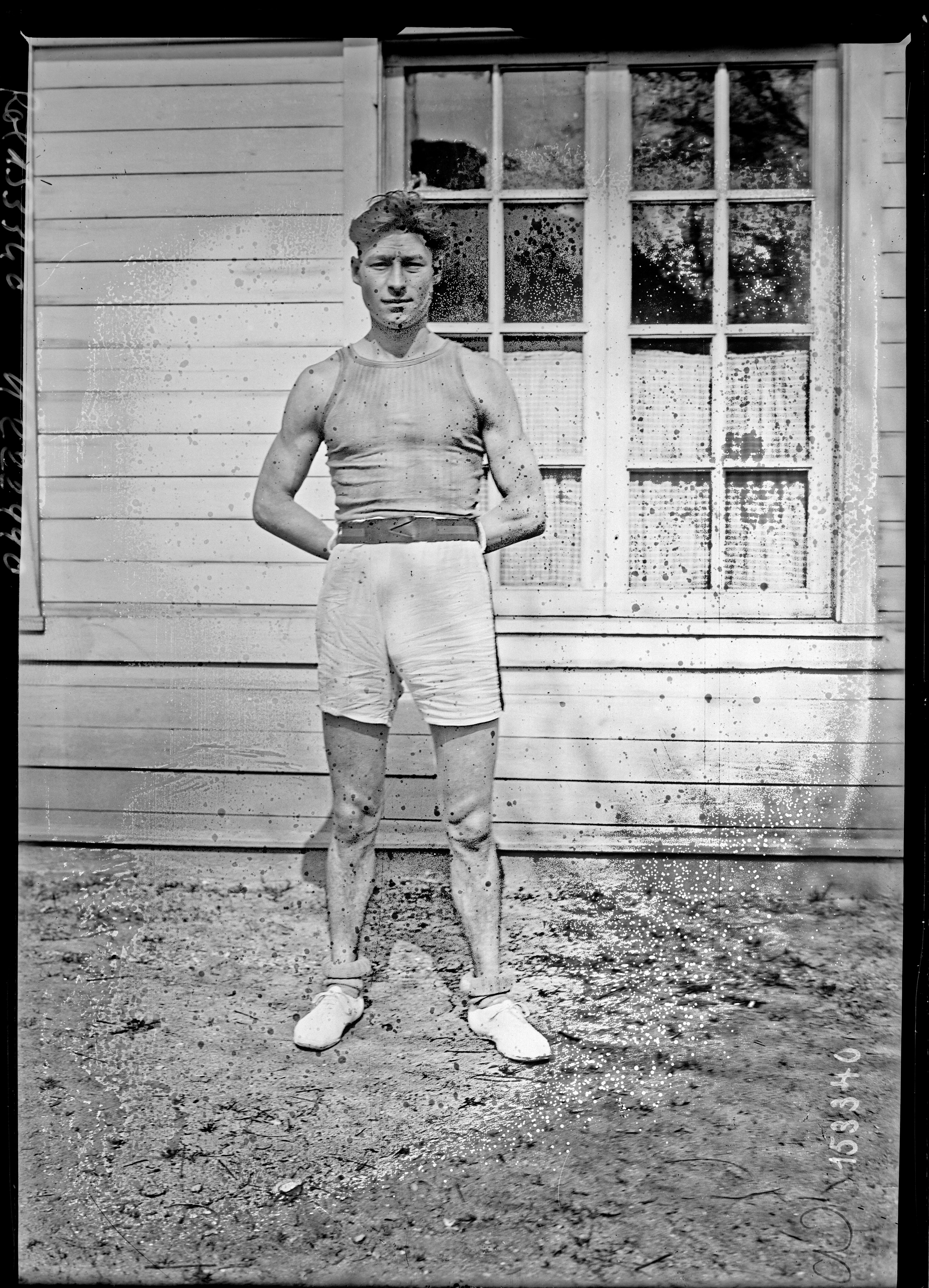

Personal information
- Nationality: French
- Born: 28 November 1905
- Died: 29 January 1981 (aged 75)

Sport
- Sport: Athletics
- Event: Racewalking

Adrien Courtois (28 November 1905 – 29 January 1981) was a French racewalker. He competed in the men's 50 kilometres walk at the 1936 Summer Olympics.
