= Arnolds Krūkliņš =

Latvian racewalker (1914–1994)

Personal information
- Nationality: Latvian
- Born: 19 February 1914 Suntaži Parish, Latvia
- Died: 31 January 1994 (aged 79) Riga, Latvia

Sport
- Sport: Athletics
- Event: Racewalking
- Club: LAS Daugava

Arnolds Krūkliņš (19 February 1914 – 31 January 1994) was a Latvian racewalker. He won the title of champion several times in the Latvian and USSR racewalking competitions and competed in the men's 50 kilometres walk at the 1936 Summer Olympics.

== Life and career ==
Krūkliņš was born in Suntaži Parish.

He won the Latvian championship in the 50 km walk in 1935, when he was 21. In 1936, he was one of three Latvians competing in the 50 km walk at the Summer Olympics in Berlin; he was disqualified.

He subsequently won the Latvian championship in the 10 km walk in 1941 (under wartime occupation) and 1948 (Latvian Soviet Socialist Republic), in the 30 km walk in 1945 and 1948 (Latvian SSR), and in the 5 km walk in 1949 (Latvian SSR), and four USSR national championships: 10 km in 1945, 20 km in 1945 and 1946, and 50 km in 1948. He set three Latvian speedwalking records: over 3000 m in 1943 and over 5000 m in 1942 and 1945.

He died in 1994 in Riga, where he is buried in the Forest Cemetery.
