= Enrique Villaplana =

Spanish racewalker

Personal information
- Nationality: Spanish
- Born: 7 March 1914
- Died: 16 May 1983 (aged 69)

Sport
- Sport: Athletics
- Event: Racewalking

Enrique Villaplana (7 March 1914 – 16 May 1983) was a Spanish racewalker. He competed in the men's 50 kilometres walk at the 1948 Summer Olympics.
