= Henri Quintric =

French racewalker

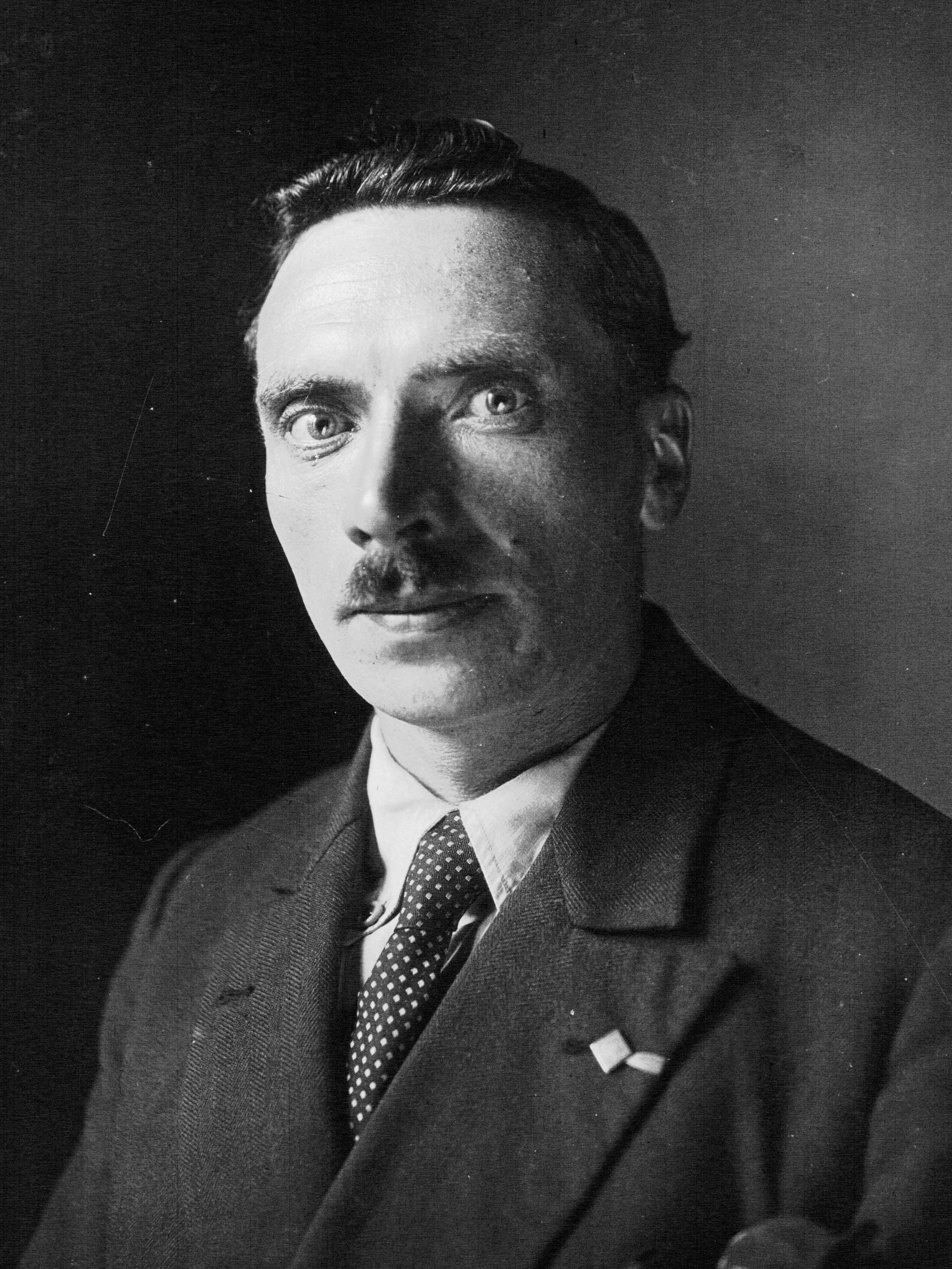

Personal information
- Nationality: French
- Born: 3 September 1897
- Died: 10 November 1955 (aged 58)

Sport
- Sport: Athletics
- Event: Racewalking

Henri Quintric (3 September 1897 – 10 November 1955) was a French racewalker. He competed in the men's 50 kilometres walk at the 1932 Summer Olympics.
