= Herbert Dill =

German racewalker

Personal information
- Full name: Herbert Gerhard Dill
- Nationality: German
- Born: 31 December 1908 Berlin, German Empire
- Died: 24 April 1942 (aged 33) Berlin, Germany

Sport
- Sport: Athletics
- Event: Racewalking
Medal record
Men's athletics
Representing Germany
European Championships
Silver medal – second place	1938 Paris	50 km walk

Herbert Gerhard Dill (31 December 1908 – 24 April 1942) was a German racewalker. He competed in the men's 50 kilometres walk at the 1936 Summer Olympics.

He died in April 1942 at the age of 33, and was buried in a mass grave at Sandweiler, Luxembourg.
