= Bill Chisholm (race walker) =

American racewalker

Personal information
- Full name: William Hugh Chisholm
- Nationality: American
- Born: June 28, 1909
- Died: November 7, 1996 (aged 87)

Sport
- Sport: Athletics
- Event: Racewalking

William Hugh Chisholm (June 28, 1909 – November 7, 1996) was an American racewalker. He competed in the men's 50 kilometres walk at the 1932 Summer Olympics.
