= Adolf Aebersold =

Swiss racewalker

Personal information
- Nationality: Swiss
- Born: 29 March 1909

Sport
- Sport: Athletics
- Event: Racewalking

Adolf Aebersold (born 29 March 1909, date of death unknown) was a Swiss racewalker. He competed in the men's 50 kilometres walk at the 1936 Summer Olympics.
