= Pierre Mazille =

French racewalker

Personal information
- Full name: Pierre Francois Mazille
- Nationality: French
- Born: 22 October 1921 Paris, France
- Died: 21 March 1979 (aged 57) Lannion, France

Sport
- Sport: Athletics
- Event: Racewalking

Pierre Francois Mazille (22 October 1921 – 21 March 1979) was a French racewalker. He competed in the men's 50 kilometres walk at the 1948 Summer Olympics.
