= Alice-Maria Reiniger =

Brazilian TV journalist

- Born: Alice-Maria Tavares Reiniger; January 31, 1945 (age 81); Guaraciaba, Minas Gerais, Brazil
- Other name: Alice-Maria
- Occupations: Journalist and television news director
- Years active: 48
- Known for: Work with TV Globo in Brazil

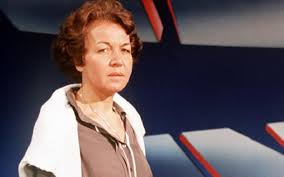
Alice-Maria Reiniger.

Alice-Maria Reiniger (born 1945) is a retired Brazilian television journalist who held many important positions, particularly with TV Globo, being its first female director of television journalism.

== Early life ==
Alice-Maria Tavares Reiniger was born in Guaraciaba in the Brazilian state of Minas Gerais on 31 January 1945. She graduated in journalism in 1966 from the Faculdade Nacional de Filosofia (National Philosophy Faculty), which later became the Federal University of Rio de Janeiro. In the same year she joined TV Globo in Rio de Janeiro as an intern, one year after the channel's foundation.

== Career ==
Reiniger stayed with TV Globo for 23 years. She actively participated in the creation of Jornal Nacional in 1969, the first Brazilian programme shown nationally, together with Armando Nogueira. In 1973, she took over his role of TV news director at Globo. She became responsible not only for the news broadcasts, but also for the editorial profiles of the programmes and the preparation of video reports.

In 1976 there was a fire at the TV Globo studio in Rio de Janeiro, caused by a short circuit in the air conditioning system, making the news room inoperative. Reiniger took a group of journalists and hurriedly flew to São Paulo to ensure that that night's Jornal Nacional went on air. The programme included footage of the Rio fire. In 1982, Alice-Maria coordinated the coverage of the 1982 elections, the first direct election since the establishment of the military regime by the 1964 coup d'état. Globo mobilized around 25,000 people across the country, to report the results and carry out analyses, interviews and reports.

In April 1990, TV Globo's journalism centre underwent changes, with Nogueira and Reiniger leaving, to be replaced by Alberico de Sousa Cruz. Upon leaving Globo, she assumed the position of executive director of journalism at the now-extinct Rede Manchete. Two years later, she created an independent video production company, No Ar Comunicação, which focused on the production of documentaries, and of entertainment and educational programmes. In 1995, with the departure of Sousa Cruz, she returned to TV Globo to establish and direct GloboNews, the first Brazilian 24-hour news channel, which was launched in October 1996.

Within 15 days of its establishment the channel was faced with covering the crash of TAM Transportes Aéreos Regionais Flight 402 near Congonhas Airport in São Paulo. Another major incident in Brazil covered during Reiniger's time in charge was the hijacking in 2000 of a bus on Line 174 in Rio de Janeiro, by Sandro Barbosa do Nascimento. Later in that year the channel covered the September 11 attacks in New York City and Washington D.C. Other major events covered during Reiniger's tenure included the Death of Diana, Princess of Wales, the United States invasion of Afghanistan, the Iraq War, the 2002 Brazilian general election, won by Luiz Inácio Lula da Silva, and the 2004 Indian Ocean earthquake and tsunami.

As of 2001, in addition to directing GloboNews, Reiniger took on the role of entertainment editorial director, providing journalistic support to shows and variety programs. In July 2009, she took over responsibility for special programme development within TV Globo, with the particular task of developing new talent. This led to programmes such as Globo Education, Globo Ecology and Globo Science.

== Retirement ==
On 2 September 2014, TV Globo announced that Reiniger had decided to retire, after a career of 48 years.

== Awards ==
In 2009, Reiniger was awarded the pt: Troféu Mulher Imprensa (Women's Press Trophy) for her lifetime contribution.
