= Ernest Koehler =

American racewalker

Personal information
- Full name: Ernest Koehler
- Nationality: American
- Born: November 24, 1903
- Died: May 1, 1960 (aged 56)

Sport
- Sport: Athletics
- Event: Racewalking

Ernest Koehler (November 24, 1903 – May 1, 1960) was an American racewalker. He competed in the men's 50 kilometres walk at the 1936 Summer Olympics.
