= Herbert Martineau =

British racewalker

Personal information
- Full name: Herbert Arthur Martineau
- Nationality: British
- Born: 24 December 1914 Poplar, England
- Died: 3 May 1994 (aged 79) Lambeth, England

Sport
- Sport: Athletics
- Event: Racewalking

Herbert Arthur Martineau (24 December 1914 – 3 May 1994) was a British racewalker. He competed in the men's 50 kilometres walk at the 1948 Summer Olympics.
