= Ernest Crosbie =

American racewalker

Personal information
- Full name: George William Ernest Crosbie
- Nationality: American
- Born: December 6, 1909
- Died: July 27, 1979 (aged 69)

Sport
- Sport: Athletics
- Event: Racewalking

George William Ernest Crosbie (December 6, 1909 – July 27, 1979) was an American race walker.

Crosbie had won US, Metropolitian and South Atlantic racewalking championships. He was a member of the Baltimore Cross Country Club. Crosbie competed in the 50 km walk at the Summer Olympics in 1932, 1936 and 1948, with a best finish of eighth in 1932. He won the 50 km walk at the United States Olympic Trials three times.
