= Cai Tsungyi =

Chinese racewalker

Personal information
- Nationality: Chinese
- Born: 12 March 1914

Sport
- Sport: Athletics
- Event: Racewalking

Cai Tsungyi (born 12 March 1914, date of death unknown) was a Chinese racewalker. He competed in the men's 50 kilometres walk at the 1936 Summer Olympics.
