= Gaston Godel =

Swiss racewalker

Personal information
- Born: 19 August 1914 Givisiez, Switzerland
- Died: 17 February 2004 (aged 89) Domdidier, Switzerland
Medal record
Men's athletics
Representing Switzerland
Olympic Games
Silver medal – second place	1948 London	50 kilometre walk

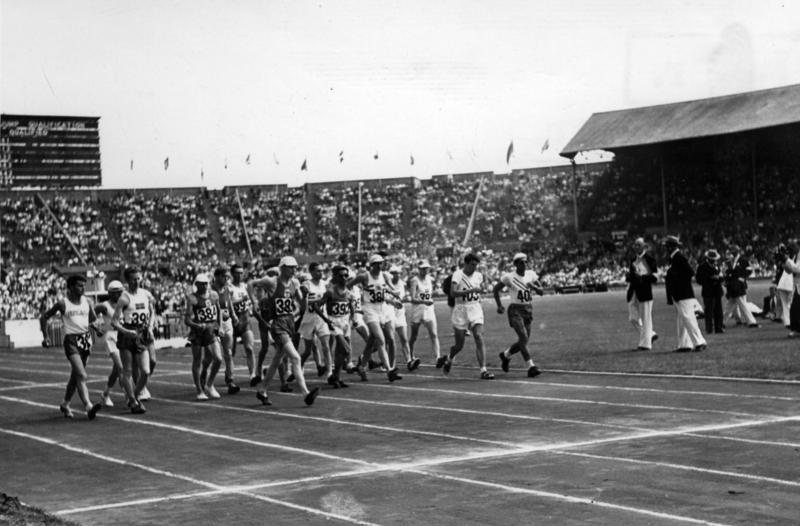
Bundesarchiv Bild 183-2008-0428-501, London, Olympiade, Sart der Geher.jpg

Gaston Godel (19 August 1914 in Givisiez − 17 February 2004 in Domdidier) was a Swiss race walker.
