= Albert Mangan =

American racewalker

Personal information
- Nationality: American
- Born: February 28, 1915
- Died: June 23, 1993 (aged 78)

Sport
- Sport: Athletics
- Event: Racewalking

Albert Mangan (February 28, 1915 – June 23, 1993) was an American racewalker. He competed in the men's 50 kilometres walk at the 1936 Summer Olympics.
