= Henri Caron =

French racewalker

Personal information
- Nationality: French
- Born: 2 July 1924
- Died: 29 April 2002 (aged 77)

Sport
- Sport: Athletics
- Event: Racewalking

Henri Caron (2 July 1924 – 29 April 2002) was a French racewalker. He competed in the men's 50 kilometres walk at the 1948 Summer Olympics.
