= Henry Cieman =

Canadian racewalker (1906–1995)

Personal information
- Nationality: Canadian
- Born: 20 July 1906 London, Great Britain
- Died: 12 January 1995 (aged 88)

Sport
- Sport: Athletics
- Event: Racewalking
- Club: Central YMCA, Toronto

Henry Cieman (20 July 1906 – 12 January 1995) was a Canadian racewalker. He competed in the men's 50 kilometres walk at the 1932 Summer Olympics. He was the world record holder at multiple distances, including the mile (1931, 6:22), 1,500 meters (1934, 6:07.3), and 3,000 meters (1931, 13:54.4).
