= Paul Sievert =

German racewalker

Personal information
- Nationality: German
- Born: 7 August 1895 Braunschweig, German Empire
- Died: 18 December 1988 (aged 93) Berlin, Germany
- Height: 1.73 m (5 ft 8 in)

Sport
- Sport: Athletics
- Event: Racewalking
- Club: Neuköllner Sportfreunde; Eisenbahn-Sportverein Berlin

Achievements and titles
- Personal best: 50 km – 4:34:03 (1924)

Paul Sievert (7 August 1895 – 18 December 1988) was a German racewalker, known for his achievements in the 50 kilometres race walk.

== Career ==
On 5 October 1924 in Munich, Sievert set a new world record in the 50 kilometres race walk. Throughout his career, he won four national championships. Sievert also competed in the 50 km walk at the 1932 Summer Olympics, where he finished sixth.

Records
Preceded by (Germany) Karl Hähnel	Men's 50km Walk World Record Holder; 5 October 1924 – 16 September 1928	Succeeded by (Italy) Romano Vecchietti
