= Karen Haude =

German field hockey player

Sport
- Sport: Field hockey
Senior career
Years	Team	Caps	Goals
1967–1974	MTV Braunschweig	-	-
1974–	Eintracht Braunschweig	-	-
National team
Years	Team	Caps	Goals
1978–1984	West Germany	60	-
Medal record
Women's field hockey
Representing West Germany
Women's Hockey World Cup
Gold medal – first place	1981 Buenos Aires	Team
Indoor Nations Championship
Gold medal – first place	1981 West Berlin	Team

Karen Fröhlich née Haude is a retired German field hockey player.

Haude played for the clubs MTV Braunschweig and Eintracht Braunschweig. With Eintracht Braunschweig, she won five German championship titles. She also played 60 games in total for the German national team.

With West Germany, Haude won the 1981 Women's Hockey World Cup. She was also called up to the West German squad for the 1980 Summer Olympics. However, due to the 1980 Summer Olympics boycott, the West German team ultimately didn't enter the tournament.

In 1981, Haude was awarded the Silbernes Lorbeerblatt. In 1988, she was inducted into the hall of fame of the Lower Saxon Institute of Sports History.
