= Karl Hähnel =

German racewalker

Personal information
- Nationality: German
- Born: 11 October 1892
- Died: 14 May 1955 (aged 62)

Sport
- Sport: Athletics
- Event: Racewalking

Karl Hähnel (11 October 1892 – 14 May 1955) was a German racewalker. He competed in the men's 50 kilometres walk at the 1932 Summer Olympics. He placed fourth (4th) with a time of 5:06:06, losing to Ugo Frigerio (3rd), Jānis Daliņš (2nd), and Tommy Green (athlete) (1st)
