= Ryoji Naraoka =

Japanese racewalker

Personal information
- Nationality: Japanese
- Born: 2 April 1908
- Died: 2 June 1992 (aged 84)

Sport
- Sport: Athletics
- Event: Racewalking

Ryoji Naraoka (奈良岡 良二, Naraoka Ryōji; 2 April 1908 – 2 June 1992) was a Japanese racewalker. He competed in the men's 50 kilometres walk at the 1936 Summer Olympics.
