= Evald Segerström =

Swedish racewalker

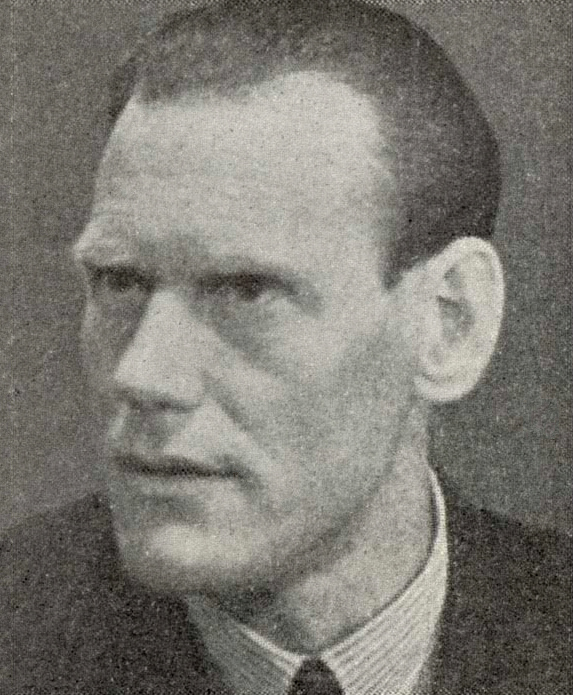

Personal information
- Born: 14 May 1902 Jonsberg, Norrköping, Sweden
- Died: 13 March 1985 (aged 82) Falun, Sweden

Sport
- Sport: Athletics
- Event: Race walking
- Club: Fredrikshofs IF, Stockholm

Achievements and titles
- Personal best: 50 kmW – 4:31:12 (1937)

Albert Evald Segerström (14 May 1902 – 13 March 1985) was a Swedish race walker. He placed 11th in the 50 km event at the 1936 Summer Olympics and sixth at the 1938 European Championships.
