= Adalberts Bubenko =

Latvian racewalker (1910–1983)

Personal information
- Born: 16 January 1910 Mõisaküla, Kreis Wolmar, Governorate of Livonia
- Died: 7 July 1983 (aged 73) Toronto, Ontario, Canada

Sport
- Sport: Athletics
- Event: Racewalking
Medal record
Men's athletics
Representing Latvia
Olympic Games
Bronze medal – third place	1936 Berlin	50 kilometre walk

Adalberts Bubenko (16 January 1910 – 7 July 1983) was a Latvian athlete, who competed mainly in the 50 kilometre walk.

He competed for Latvia in the 1936 Summer Olympics held in Berlin, Germany in the 50 kilometre walk where he won the bronze medal.
