= Valentino Bertolini =

Italian racewalker

Personal information
- Born: 18 January 1917 Dossobuono, Italy
- Died: 26 January 1967 (aged 50) Turin, Italy

Sport
- Country: Italy
- Sport: Athletics
- Event: Race walk

Valentino Bertolini (18 January 1917 – 26 January 1967) was an Italian racewalker who competed at the 1948 Summer Olympics.
