= Valy (Pardubice District) =

- Municipality
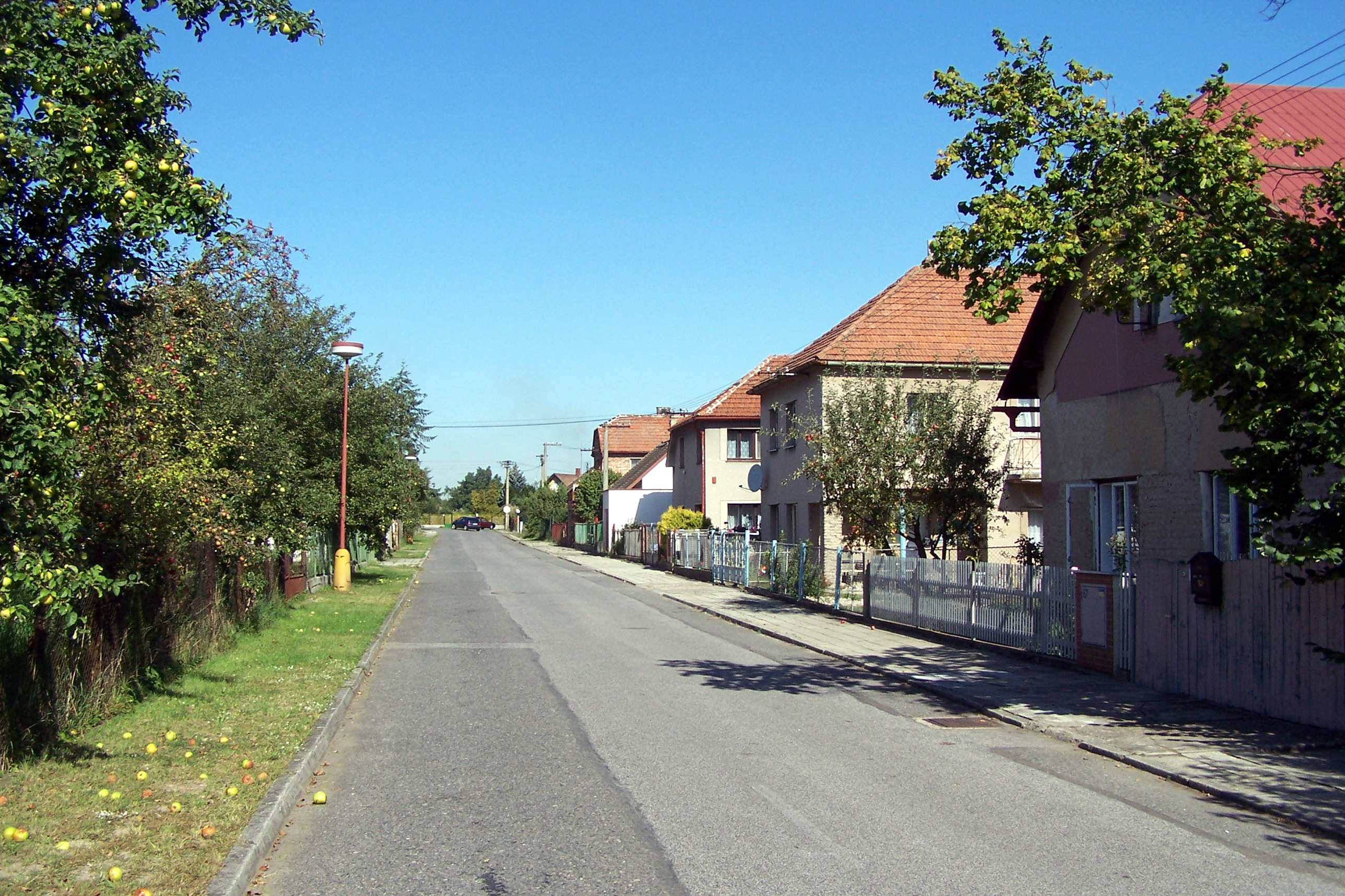
- Lepějovická street

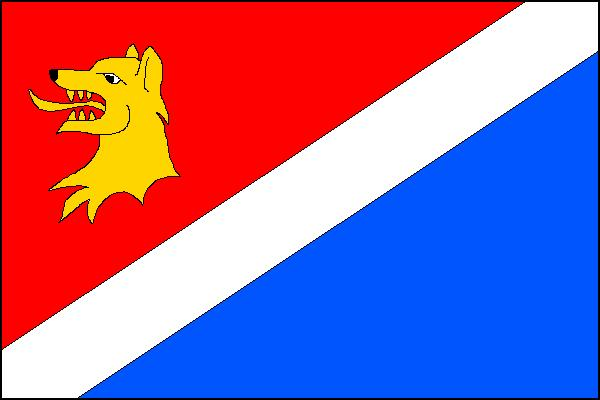
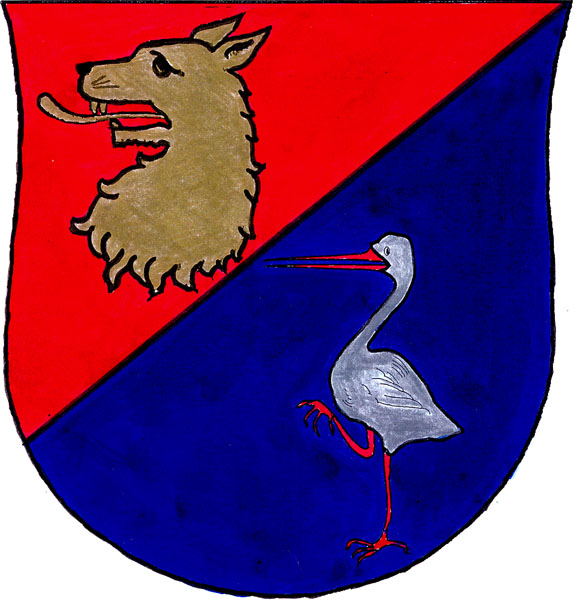
- Flag Coat of arms

- Location in the Czech Republic
- Coordinates: 50°1′47″N 15°37′0″E
- Country: Czech Republic
- Region: Pardubice
- District: Pardubice
- First mentioned: 1398

Area
  - Total: 4.29 km^{2} (1.66 sq mi)
- Elevation: 217 m (712 ft)

Population (2026-01-01)
  - Total: 512
  - Density: 119/km^{2} (309/sq mi)
- Time zone: UTC+1 (CET)
  - Summer (DST): UTC+2 (CEST)
- Postal code: 535 01
- Website: www.valynadlabem.cz

Valy is a municipality and village in Pardubice District in the Pardubice Region of the Czech Republic. It has about 500 inhabitants.

== Etymology ==
The name is the plural of the Czech word val, meaning 'levee' or 'defensive wall'.

== Geography ==
Valy is located about 10 kilometres (6 mi) west of Pardubice. It lies in the western tip of the Svitavy Uplands. The highest point is the hill Bílý kopec at 247 m (810 ft) above sea level. The municipality is situated on the right bank of the Elbe River, which forms the northern municipal border.

The Struha Stream flows east of the village and connects with the Elbe. The surroundings of the Struha with the original meandering stream bed is protected as the Meandry Struhy National Monument.

== History ==
The first written mention of Valy is from 1398. The history of Valy is connected with the village of Lepějovice, first mentioned in 1167. Lepějovice was abandoned between 1704 and 1848, when both villages were part of the Choltice estate. In addition to Lepějovice, the today's territory of the municipality also includes the former village of Crkaň.

== Demographics ==
Historical population

| Year | Pop. | ±% |
|---|---|---|
| 1869 | 299 | — |
| 1880 | 354 | +18.4% |
| 1890 | 313 | −11.6% |
| 1900 | 354 | +13.1% |
| 1910 | 372 | +5.1% |

| Year | Pop. | ±% |
|---|---|---|
| 1921 | 363 | −2.4% |
| 1930 | 402 | +10.7% |
| 1950 | 407 | +1.2% |
| 1961 | 479 | +17.7% |
| 1970 | 443 | −7.5% |

| Year | Pop. | ±% |
|---|---|---|
| 1980 | 440 | −0.7% |
| 1991 | 403 | −8.4% |
| 2001 | 435 | +7.9% |
| 2011 | 461 | +6.0% |
| 2021 | 450 | −2.4% |

Source: Censuses

== Transport ==
The I/2 road (the section from Pardubice to Kutná Hora) runs through the municipality.

Two different railway lines passes through the municipality. The Valy u Přelouče stop is located on the Kolín–Česká Třebová line. The Valy u Přelouče zastávka stop is located on the Přelouč–Heřmanův Městec line.

== Sights ==
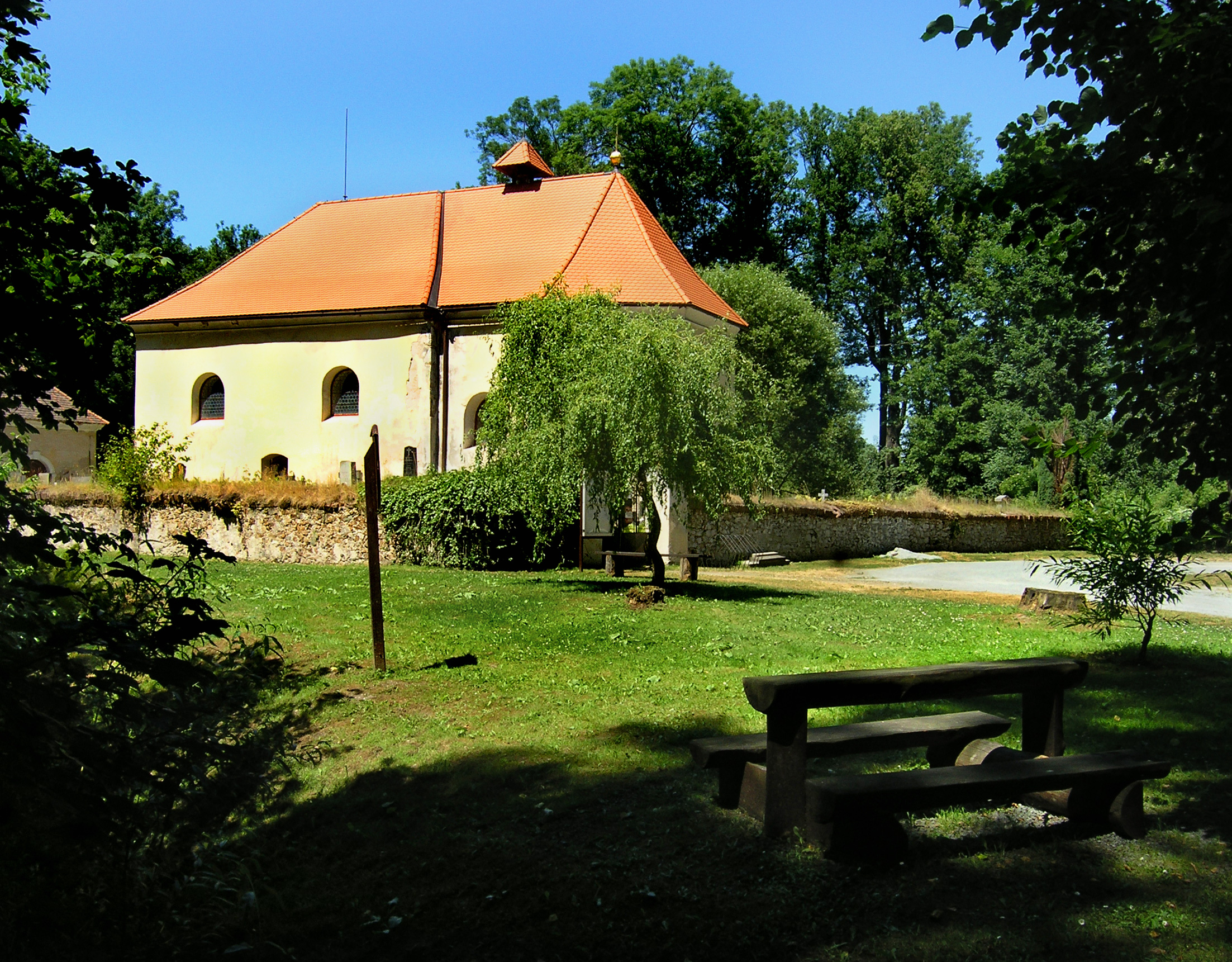
Church of Saint Michael the Archangel

The Church of Saint Michael the Archangel is located in the area on the extinct village of Lepějovice. It is originally a nearly Gothic church from the second half of the 13th century, which was completely rebuilt in the Baroque style in 1819 into its current appearance.

Z pěti kanálů Bridge is a railway bridge from 1845. It is protected as a technical monument.
