= Harold Whitlock =

British racewalker

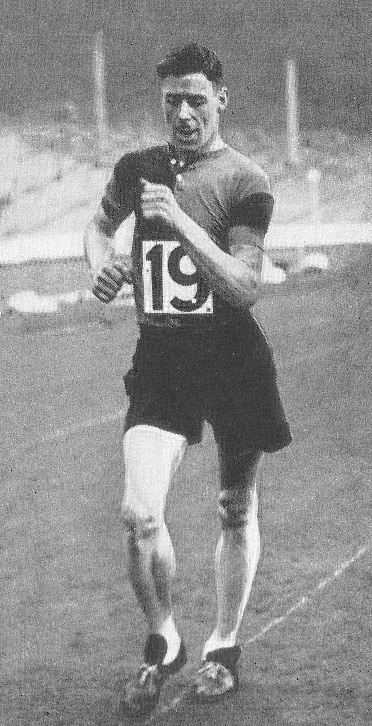
- Whitlock, c. 1939

Personal information
- Born: 16 December 1903 Hendon, Middlesex, United Kingdom
- Died: 27 December 1985 (aged 82) Wicklewood, Norfolk, United Kingdom

Sport
- Sport: Athletics
- Event: 50 km walk
- Club: Metropolitan WC, London

Achievements and titles
- Personal best: 4:30:38.0 (1936)
Medal record
Men's athletics
Representing Great Britain
Olympic Games
Gold medal – first place	1936 Berlin	50 km walk
European Championships
Gold medal – first place	1938 Paris	50 km walk

Hector Harold Whitlock (16 December 1903 – 27 December 1985) was a British athlete who competed mainly in the 50 kilometre walk. He attended Hendon School, then Hendon County School, in North London, where he planted in 1936 an oak tree sapling presented to him, along with his gold medal, by Adolf Hitler at the Olympic Games.

Whitlock won his first national title in 1933. Two years later, he set a new world record for a 30-mile walk, finishing in 4 hours, 29 minutes, 31.8 seconds. In the same year, he also became the first recorded man to walk between London and Brighton in under eight hours.

His main achievement came in 1936, where he won the gold medal in the 50 kilometre walk at the Summer Olympics held in Berlin, Germany, representing Great Britain, finishing in a time of 4 hours, 30 minutes, 41.4 seconds. He gained this victory despite being affected by sickness about 38 kilometres into the race. This sickness, apparently food-related, also affected his fellow British competitors Tebbs Lloyd Johnson and Joe Hopkins.

During the 1936 Olympics, oak saplings were given to gold medallists. Rather than planting the oak in his garden, Whitlock offered his as a gift to his former school, Hendon School. The oak remained at the school until 2007, when it had to be removed due to a dangerous amount of rot.

He continued to represent Britain at international level until 1952, when he came 11th at the Helsinki Olympics behind his younger brother Rex, who finished fourth. Competing at the age of 48, Harold Whitlock was Britain's oldest ever international athlete.

After this, Whitlock continued as a coach and judge. Notably, he coached Don Thompson, who won gold in the 50 kilometre walking event at the 1960 Olympics. Thompson would eventually take over his world record for the 30 miles (48 kilometres) walk. Whitlock also served as an official at those same Olympics.

He died on 27 December 1985 at the age of 82. In 2011, he was inducted into the England Athletics Hall of Fame.
