= Rune Bjurström =

Swedish racewalker

Personal information
- Nationality: Swedish
- Born: 22 September 1912
- Died: 29 August 1996 (aged 83)

Sport
- Sport: Athletics
- Event: Racewalking

Rune Bjurström (22 September 1912 – 29 August 1996) was a Swedish racewalker. He competed in the men's 50 kilometres walk at the 1948 Summer Olympics.
