= Josef Šlehofer =

Czech racewalker

Personal information
- Nationality: Czech
- Born: 29 April 1899 Prague, Austria-Hungary
- Died: 1980 (aged 80–81) Prague, Czechoslovakia

Sport
- Sport: Athletics
- Event: Racewalking

Josef Šlehofer (29 April 1899 – 1980) was a Czech racewalker. He competed in the men's 10 kilometres walk at the 1920 Summer Olympics.
