= Sándor László =

Hungarian racewalker

Personal information
- Nationality: Hungarian
- Born: 4 March 1925
- Died: September 2002

Sport
- Sport: Athletics
- Event: Racewalking

Sándor László (4 March 1925 – September 2002) was a Hungarian racewalker. He competed in the men's 50 kilometres walk at the 1948 Summer Olympics and the 1952 Summer Olympics.
