= Joe Hopkins =

British racewalker

Personal information
- Full name: Joseph George John Hopkins
- Nationality: British
- Born: 19 February 1902
- Died: 23 October 1974 (aged 72)

Sport
- Sport: Athletics
- Event: Racewalking

Joseph George John Hopkins (19 February 1902 – 23 October 1974) was a British racewalker. He competed in the men's 50 kilometres walk at the 1936 Summer Olympics.
