= Arthur Tell Schwab =

Swiss racewalker

Medal record

Men's athletics

Representing Switzerland

Olympic Games
Silver medal – second place	1936 Berlin	50 km walk

European Championships
Silver medal – second place	1934 Turin	50 km walk

Arthur Tell Schwab (4 September 1896 – 27 February 1945) was a Swiss race walker. He won an Olympic silver medal over 50 kilometres in Berlin 1936. Two years earlier he had won a silver medal at the European Championships.

His son Erich Arthur Fritz Schwab won an Olympic bronze medal in 1948 and a silver in 1952 over 10 kilometres walk.

He was killed in an air raid bombing in Seglingen near Heilbronn, Germany, during World War II.
