= Gerhard Winther =

Norwegian racewalker

Gerhard Winther (12 May 1913 – 28 August 1987) was a Norwegian race walker. He was born in Trondheim, and represented the sports club Trondhjems Gangklubb. He competed at the 1948 Summer Olympics in London, and at the 1952 Summer Olympics in Helsinki.
