= Jaroslav Štork =

Czechoslovak racewalker

Personal information
- Nationality: Czechoslovak
- Born: 3 April 1909 Valy, Bohemia, Austria-Hungary
- Died: 12 November 1980 (aged 71) Brno, Czechoslovakia

Sport
- Sport: Athletics
- Event: Racewalking

Jaroslav Štork (3 April 1909 – 12 November 1980) was a Czechoslovak racewalker. He competed in the men's 50 kilometres walk at the 1936 Summer Olympics.
