= Karl Reiniger =

Swiss racewalker

Personal information
- Nationality: Swiss
- Born: 9 April 1910
- Died: 25 May 1995 (aged 85)

Sport
- Sport: Athletics
- Event: Racewalking

Karl Reiniger (9 April 1910 – 25 May 1995) was a Swiss racewalker. He competed in the men's 50 kilometres walk at the 1936 Summer Olympics.
