= Guaraciaba, Minas Gerais =

Brazilian municipality located in the state of Minas Gerais

Coordinates: 20°34′15″S 43°00′28″W

- Municipality
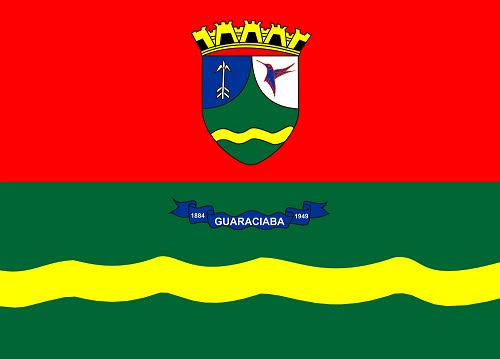
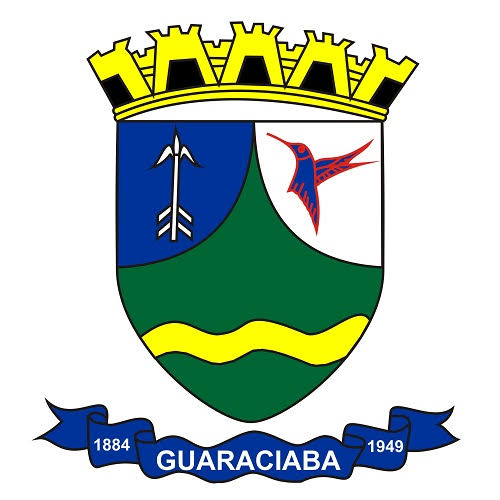
- Flag Coat of arms
- Interactive map of Guaraciaba, Minas Gerais
- Country: Brazil
- State: Minas Gerais
- Region: Southeast
- Time zone: UTC−3 (BRT)

Location of Guaraciaba within Minas Gerais

Guaraciaba is a Brazilian municipality located in the state of Minas Gerais. The city belongs to the mesoregion of Zona da Mata and to the microregion of Ponte Nova.

Estimated population in 2020 is 10,315. Area of territorial unit 2020 (km²) 348.596.

== See also ==
- List of municipalities in Minas Gerais
