= Étienne Laisné =

French racewalker

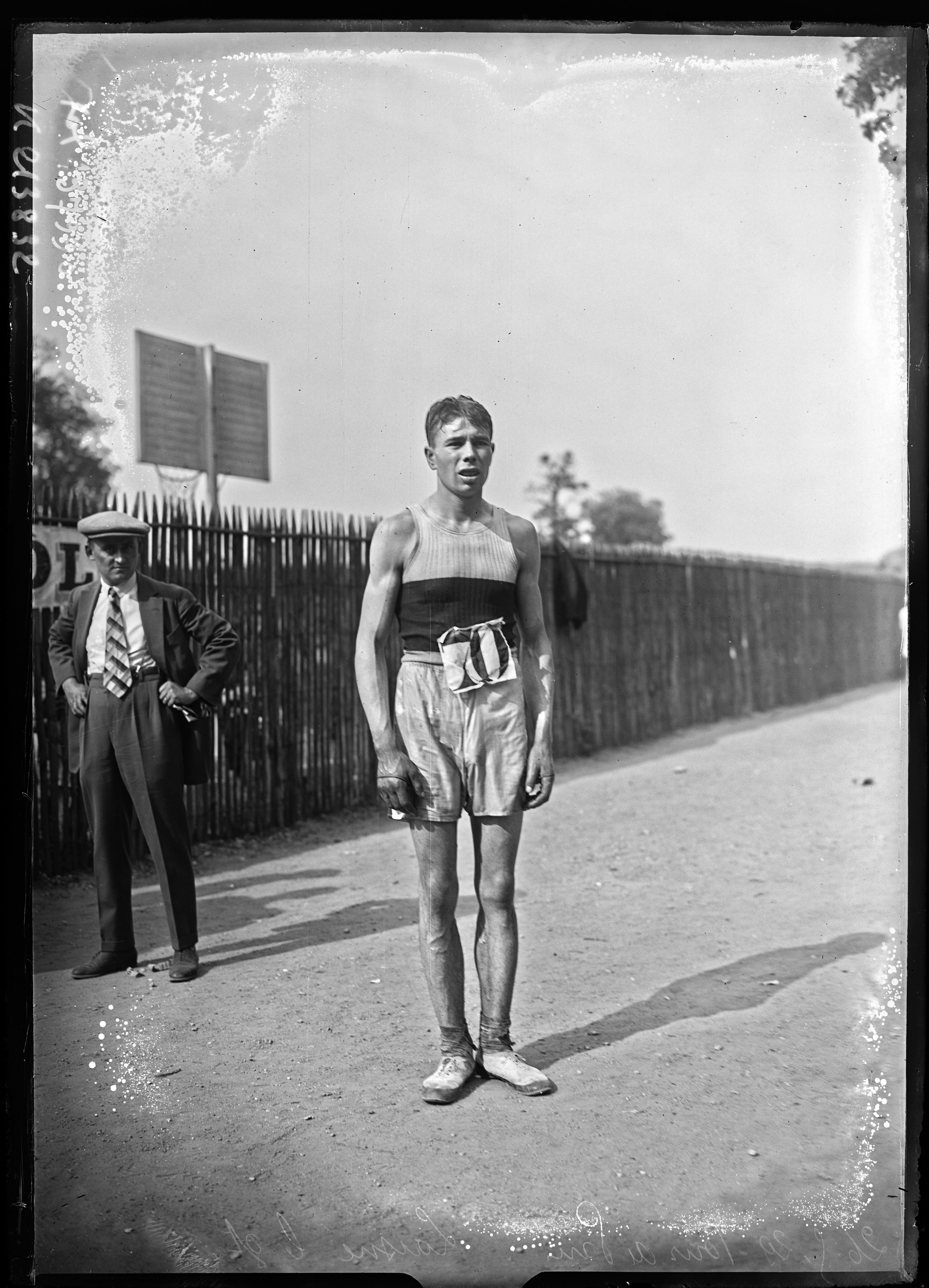

Personal information
- Nationality: French
- Born: 5 August 1905
- Died: 18 October 1997 (aged 92)

Sport
- Sport: Athletics
- Event: Racewalking

Étienne Laisné (5 August 1905 – 18 October 1997) was a French racewalker. He competed in the men's 50 kilometres walk at the 1936 Summer Olympics.
