= Anton Toscani =

Dutch race walker

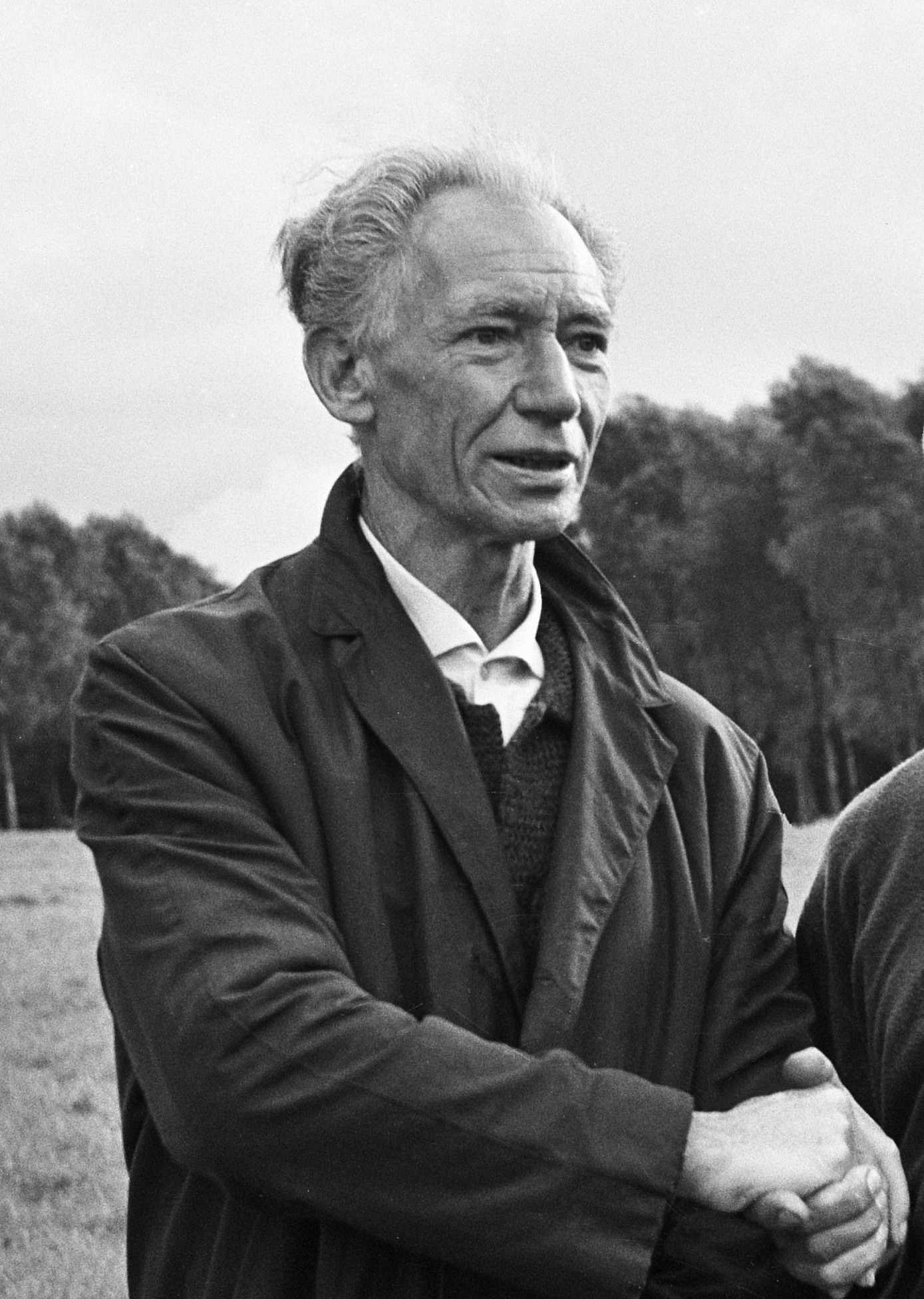
- Anton Toscani in 1964

Personal information
- Born: 29 July 1901 Amsterdam, the Netherlands
- Died: 1 November 1984 (aged 83) Amstelveen, the Netherlands

Sport
- Sport: Race walking
- Club: AAC, Amsterdam

Achievements and titles
- Olympic finals: 1936

Antonius Franciscus Cornelis "Anton" Toscani (29 July 1901 – 1 November 1984) was a Dutch race walker who specialized in the 50 km. In this event, he finished tenth at the 1936 Summer Olympics and eighth at the 1938 European Championships.
