= Vasile Firea =

Romanian racewalker

Personal information
- Nationality: Romanian
- Born: 21 August 1908
- Died: 1991 (aged 82–83)

Sport
- Sport: Athletics
- Event: Racewalking

Vasile Firea (21 August 1908 – 1991) was a Romanian racewalker. He competed in the men's 50 kilometres walk at the 1936 Summer Olympics.
