= Jānis Daliņš =

Latvian racewalker (1904–1978)

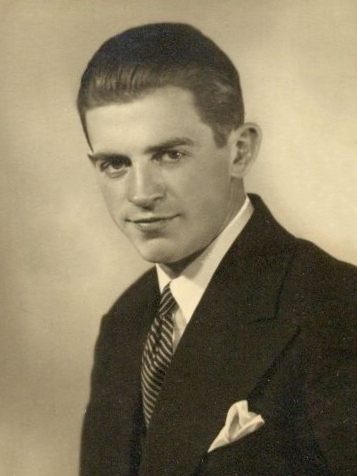

Personal information
- Nationality: Latvian
- Born: 5 November 1904 Valmiera, Livonian Governorate, Russian Empire
- Died: 11 June 1978 (aged 73) Melbourne, Australia
- Height: 180 cm (5 ft 11 in)

Sport
- Country: Latvia
- Sport: Race walking
- Event: 5–50 km
- Club: Valmieras Sporta Biedrība

Achievements and titles
- Personal bests: 10 km – 44:45.8; 20 km – 1.34:26.0 (1933); 30 km – 2.31:30.6 (1934); 50 km – 4.37:50, 2 (1937)
Medal record
Men's athletics
Representing Latvia
Olympic Games
Silver medal – second place	1932 Los Angeles	50 km walk
European Championships
Gold medal – first place	1934 Turin	50 km walk

Jānis Daliņš (5 November 1904 – 11 June 1978) was a Latvian race walker. Competing in the 50 km event he won a silver medal at the 1932 Olympics, becoming the first athlete to win an Olympic medal competing for Latvia. He also won the 1934 European title and set seven world records in the 1930s. At the 1936 Olympics he led the race at 30 km, but was forced to withdraw due to a leg injury.

== Biography ==
Daliņš started late, and had his first competition at the age of 22. A few months later he set a Latvian record in the 5000 m walk. He finished second behind Ugo Frigerio in the 7 miles walk event and third behind Alf Pope in the 2 miles walk event at the 1931 AAA Championships.

In 1932, he set his first world record, over the 25 mile distance and was later awarded the Order of the Three Stars 5th Class. Daliņš finished second in the 2 and 7 mile walk events at the 1933 AAA Championships.

After the 1936 Olympics Dāliņš semi-retired from athletics to work on his farm and raise his family. He resumed competing around 1940, and won the Latvian championships in 1942. In 1944 he moved from Latvia to Germany, where in 1947 he won his last race.

In 1949 Dāliņš migrated to Australia, together with his wife Ella, daughter Rudite, and sons Ivars and Jānis. He was initially placed in the Bonegilla Migrant Reception and Training Centre in northeast Victoria. Jānis worked as a carpenter in the rural town of Benalla, building many homes in post-war Australia. After completing his contracted time working in Benalla, he moved his family to Melbourne. There he raised his children, enjoyed his favourite hobby (fishing) and managed a sports club from 1959 to 1964.

== Legacy ==
Daliņš' success made race walking one of the most popular athletics disciplines in Latvia, with two more Latvians winning Olympic medals: Adalberts Bubenko in 1936 and Aigars Fadejevs in 2000. Daliņš is regarded as the best athlete of pre-World War II Latvia. A phrase: "Ak, kaut man Daliņa kājas būtu" ("Oh, if only I had Daliņš' legs", originally the title of a 1930s song) remains widely known in Latvia. Daliņš remains a well-known name in Latvia, with a stadium and a street in his hometown of Valmiera bearing his name.
