= Francesco Pretti =

Italian racewalker (1903–1988)

Personal information
- Nationality: Italian
- Born: 28 September 1903 Cagliari
- Died: 16 April 1988 (aged 84)
- Height: 1.68 kg
- Weight: 68 kg (150 lb)

Sport
- Country: Italy
- Sport: Athletics
- Event: Race walk

Francesco Pretti (28 September 1903 – 16 April 1988) was an Italian racewalker who competed at the 1932 Summer Olympics. and at the 1948 Summer Olympics.
