= Giuseppe Gobbato =

Italian racewalker

Personal information
- Nationality: Italian
- Born: 28 May 1904 Voghera, Kingdom of Italy
- Died: 4 September 1990 (aged 86)

Sport
- Country: Italy
- Sport: Athletics
- Event: Race walk

Giuseppe Gobbato (28 May 1904 - 4 September 1990) was an Italian racewalker who competed at the 1936 Summer Olympics.

== National titles ==
- Italian Athletics Championships
  - 50 km walk: 1937
