= Edgar Bruun =

Norwegian racewalker

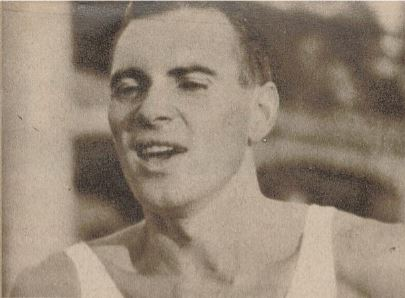
- Edgar Bruun in 1948

Personal information
- Born: August 4, 1905
- Died: October 30, 1985 (aged 80) Oslo
- Occupation: race walker
Medal record
Men's athletics
Representing Norway
European Championships
Bronze medal – third place	1938 Paris	50 km walk

Edgar Bruun (4 August 1905 – 30 October 1985) was a Norwegian race walker.

== Career ==
Bruun began his sports career in 1928. He competed three times in the Olympic Games in the 50 km race walk. In 1938, he won the bronze medal in the European Championships in the 50 km race walk with a time of 4:44:35. Bruun was also a multiple medalist in the Norwegian Championships in race walking over various distances.

He set world records six times at different distances. On June 28, 1936, in Oslo, he set a world record in the 50 km race walk with a time of 4:26:41.

During his career, Bruun represented the clubs IL Frogg Oslo and IK Hero Oslo.

By profession, he was a barber and ran his own barber shop in Kampen. Edgar Bruun died on October 30, 1985, in Oslo.

== Achievements ==
Year	Tournament	Venue	Result	Extra
1936	Olympic Games	Berlin, Germany	5th	50 km
1938	European Championships	Paris, France	3rd	50 km
1948	Olympic Games	London, England	4th	50 km
1952	Olympic Games	Helsinki, Finland	17th	50 km
1954	European Championships	Bern, Switzerland	9th	50 km

Records
Preceded by (Italy) Romano Vecchietti	Men's 50km Walk World Record Holder; 28 June 1936 – 17 August 1941	Succeeded by (Denmark) Viggo Ingvorsen
