= Fritz Bleiweiß =

German racewalker

Personal information
- Nationality: German
- Born: November 27, 1911
- Died: June 27, 1989 (aged 77)

Sport
- Sport: Racewalking

Achievements and titles
- Olympic finals: 1936 Summer Olympics

Fritz Bleiweiß (27 November 1911 – 27 June 1989) was a German racewalker, best known for his achievements in 50 kilometres race walk

In 1934 European Athletics Championships in Turin, Italy, he did not finish the race. At the 1936 Summer Olympics in Berlin, Germany, he reached 6th place, and 4th in 1938 European Athletics Championships in Paris, France.

Multiple medalist (including gold) in national championships.

He represented Berliner Athletik Klub and MTV Braunschweig.

== Life records ==
- 50 kilometres race walk - 4:36:49 (1936)

== Bibliography ==
- "Fritz Bleiweiß Biography and Olympic Results". sports-reference.com. Archived from the original on 2012-12-13.
- Athlete profile in tilastopaja.org database
