= Athletics at the 1952 Summer Olympics – Men's discus throw =

Men's discus throw at the Games of the XV Olympiad
- Venue: Helsinki Olympic Stadium
- Date: 22 July 1952 (qualifying and final)
- Competitors: 32 from 20 nations
- Winning distance: 55.03 OR

Medalists
1st place, gold medalist(s)		Sim Iness; United States
2nd place, silver medalist(s)		Adolfo Consolini; Italy
3rd place, bronze medalist(s)		James Dillion; United States

The men's discus throw event at the 1952 Summer Olympics took place on 22 July at the Helsinki Olympic Stadium. Thirty-two athletes from 20 nations competed. The maximum number of athletes per nation had been set at 3 since the 1930 Olympic Congress. The event was won by Sim Iness of the United States, the nation's eighth victory in the men's discus throw. Defending champion Adolfo Consolini of Italy took silver, becoming the fourth man to win two medals in the event. American James Dillion won bronze.

== Background ==
This was the 12th appearance of the event, which is one of 12 athletics events to have been held at every Summer Olympics. Eight of the top nine finishers from the 1948 Games returned: gold medalist Adolfo Consolini and silver medalist Giuseppe Tosi of Italy, bronze medalist Fortune Gordien of the United States, fifth-place finisher Ferenc Klics of Hungary, sixth-place finisher Veikko Nyqvist and ninth-place finisher Arvo Huutoniemi of Finland, seventh-place finisher (and 1936 finalist) Nikolaos Syllas of Greece, and eighth-place finisher Stein Johnson of Norway. Consolini, also the 1950 European champion, was favored to repeat. The American team was also strong, as usual, with Gordien holding the world record and Sim Iness winning the U.S. Olympic trials.

Australia, Iceland, Israel, and the Soviet Union each made their debut in the men's discus throw. The United States made its 12th appearance, having competed in every edition of the Olympic men's discus throw to date.

== Competition format ==
The competition used the two-round format introduced in 1936, with the qualifying round completely separate from the divided final. In qualifying, each athlete received three attempts; those recording a mark of at least 46.00 metres advanced to the final. If fewer than 12 athletes achieved that distance, the top 12 would advance. The results of the qualifying round were then ignored. Finalists received three throws each, with the top six competitors receiving an additional three attempts. The best distance among those six throws counted.

== Records ==
Prior to the competition, the existing world and Olympic records were as follows.

World record	Fortune Gordien (USA)	56.97	Hämeenlinna, Finland	14 August 1949
Olympic record	Adolfo Consolini (ITA)	52.78	London, United Kingdom	2 August 1948

The three medalists (Sim Iness, Adolfo Consolini, and James Dillion) all bettered the old Olympic record. Iness was the first to do so, throwing 53.47 metres in the first set of throws in the final. Iness improved on his new record with 54.60 metres in the second set and 55.03 metres in the third.

== Schedule ==
All times are Eastern European Summer Time (UTC+3)

Date	Time	Round
Tuesday, 22 July 1952	10:00; 16:00	Qualifying; Final

== Results ==
=== Qualifying round ===
Qualification: Qualifying Performance 46.00 advance to the final.

Rank	Group	Athlete	Nation	1	2	3	Distance	Notes
1	A	Adolfo Consolini	Italy	51.89	—	—	51.89	Q
2	A	Fortune Gordien	United States	38.84	45.61	50.34	50.34	Q
3	A	Oto Grigalka	Soviet Union	43.21	48.93	—	48.93	Q
4	A	Sim Iness	United States	48.90	—	—	48.90	Q
5	A	James Dillion	United States	47.92	—	—	47.92	Q
6	B	Nikolaos Syllas	Greece	47.84	—	—	47.84	Q
7	A	Ferenc Klics	Hungary	44.61	47.63	—	47.63	Q
8	B	Roland Nilsson	Sweden	47.18	—	—	47.18	Q
9	B	Per Stavem	Norway	46.74	—	—	46.74	Q
10	B	Giuseppe Tosi	Italy	46.59	—	—	46.59	Q
11	B	Roy Pella	Canada	46.58	—	—	46.58	Q
11	B	Jørgen Munk Plum	Denmark	46.58	—	—	46.58	Q
13	B	Jean Maissant	France	45.45	X	46.47	46.47	Q
14	A	Boris Butenko	Soviet Union	46.43	—	—	46.43	Q
15	B	Veikko Nyqvist	Finland	46.41	—	—	46.41	Q
16	B	Boris Matveyev	Soviet Union	42.18	46.31	—	46.31	Q
17	B	Konstantinos Giataganas	Greece	44.88	46.05	—	46.05	Q
18	B	Olli Partanen	Finland	45.71	X	45.33	45.71	
19	B	Mark Pharaoh	Great Britain	43.99	45.05	45.24	45.24	
20	A	Stein Johnson	Norway	40.36	45.11	45.19	45.19	
21	B	Ian Reed	Australia	41.51	45.12	44.24	45.12	
22	A	Friðrik Guðmundsson	Iceland	45.00	X	43.38	45.00	
23	A	Oskar Häfliger	Switzerland	38.90	X	44.73	44.73	
24	B	Þorsteinn Löve	Iceland	44.27	X	44.28	44.28	
25	A	Lucien Guillier	France	43.88	X	X	43.88	
26	A	Kristian Johansen	Norway	41.76	43.46	X	43.46	
27	A	Josef Hipp	Germany	39.62	X	43.38	43.38	
28	A	Hernán Haddad	Chile	X	42.89	41.47	42.89	
29	A	Arvo Huutoniemi	Finland	40.07	42.79	42.51	42.79	
30	A	Raymond Kintziger	Belgium	40.63	41.46	37.49	41.46	
31	B	Nuri Turan	Turkey	38.31	41.45	39.52	41.45	
32	A	Uri Gallin	Israel	X	40.76	40.36	40.76	
—	A	Bob Adams	Canada	DNS				
—	A	Cummin Clancy	Ireland	DNS				
—	B	Mihai Raica	Romania	DNS				
—	B	Georgios Roubanis	Greece	DNS				
—	B	José Luis Torres	Spain	DNS				
—	B	Hermann Tunner	Austria	DNS				

=== Final ===
Rank	Athlete	Nation	1	2	3	4	5	6	Distance	Notes
1st place, gold medalist(s)	Sim Iness	United States	53.47 OR	54.60 OR	55.03 OR	53.49	54.13	52.82	55.03	OR
2nd place, silver medalist(s)	Adolfo Consolini	Italy	51.69	53.78	53.45	50.63	50.08	51.20	53.78	
3rd place, bronze medalist(s)	James Dillion	United States	52.47	48.06	51.76	53.28	X	52.28	53.28	
4	Fortune Gordien	United States	52.52	52.66	51.71	51.48	X	49.93	52.66	
5	Ferenc Klics	Hungary	48.74	49.07	51.13	X	49.79	X	51.13	
6	Oto Grigalka	Soviet Union	50.71	X	47.84	X	X	X	50.71	
7	Roland Nilsson	Sweden	X	48.90	50.06	Did not advance			50.06	
8	Giuseppe Tosi	Italy	45.85	49.03	48.97	Did not advance			49.03	
9	Nikolaos Syllas	Greece	48.99	48.36	47.17	Did not advance			48.99	
10	Boris Matveyev	Soviet Union	47.27	44.47	48.70	Did not advance			48.70	
11	Boris Butenko	Soviet Union	X	43.66	48.15	Did not advance			48.15	
12	Veikko Nyqvist	Finland	47.72	45.99	46.63	Did not advance			47.72	
13	Jørgen Munk Plum	Denmark	38.73	45.20	47.26	Did not advance			47.26	
14	Roy Pella	Canada	X	46.63	45.47	Did not advance			46.63	
15	Konstantinos Giataganas	Greece	42.40	46.23	X	Did not advance			46.23	
16	Per Stavem	Norway	39.78	X	46.00	Did not advance			46.00	
17	Jean Maissant	France	43.40	42.11	35.82	Did not advance			43.40	
