= Athletics at the 1956 Summer Olympics – Men's discus throw =

Men's discus throw at the Games of the XV Olympiad
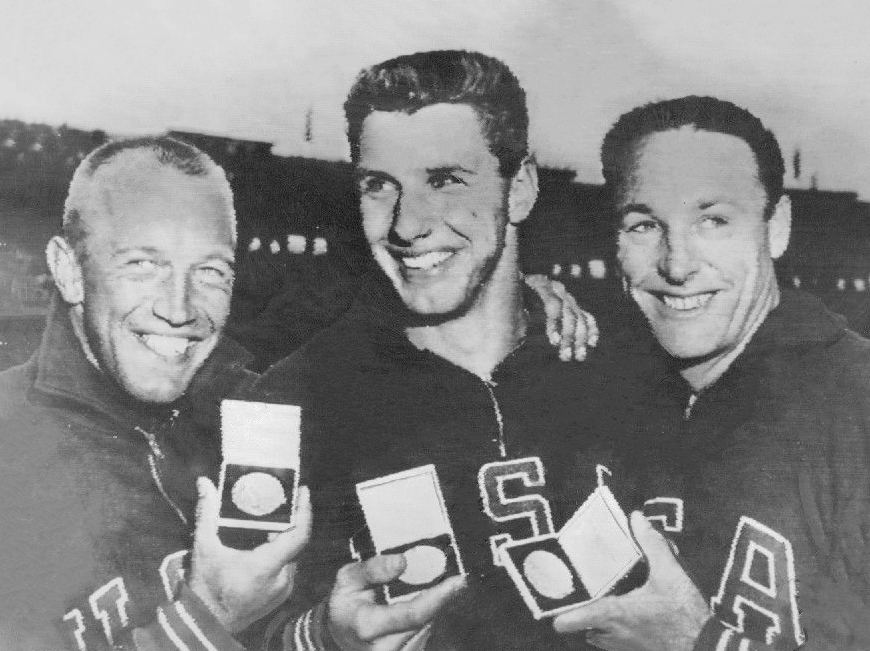
- Left-right: Koch, Oerter, Gordien
- Venue: Olympic Park Stadium
- Date: 27 November 1956 (qualifying and final)
- Competitors: 20 from 15 nations
- Winning distance: 56.36 OR

Medalists
1st place, gold medalist(s)		Al Oerter; United States
2nd place, silver medalist(s)		Fortune Gordien; United States
3rd place, bronze medalist(s)		Des Koch; United States

Video on YouTube Official Video @34:58

The men's discus throw was an event at the 1956 Summer Olympics in Melbourne, Australia. Twenty athletes from 15 nations competed. The maximum number of athletes per nation had been set at 3 since the 1930 Olympic Congress. The qualifying round and the final both were held on Tuesday November 27, 1956. The event was won by Al Oerter of the United States, the nation's second consecutive and ninth overall victory in the men's discus throw. It was the first of four straight gold medals for Oerter. The United States earned its second medal sweep in the event (after 1908), as Fortune Gordien took silver and Des Koch took bronze. Gordien became the fifth man to win two medals in the event, and the first to do so in non-consecutive Games (silver in 1948, fourth place in 1952). Italy's three-Games medal streak in the event ended.

== Background ==
This was the 13th appearance of the event, which is one of 12 athletics events to have been held at every Summer Olympics. Returning finalists from the 1952 Games were silver medalist (and 1948 gold medalist) Adolfo Consolini of Italy, fourth-place finisher (and 1948 bronze medalist) Fortune Gordien of the United States, fifth-place finisher Ferenc Klics of Hungary, and sixth-place finisher Oto Grigalka and tenth-place finisher Boris Matveyev of the Soviet Union. Consolini, the two-time Olympic medalist and three-time European champion, was the "slight favorite".

However, the American team was also strong. Fortune Gordien came into the Olympics as the world record holder for most of the previous seven years. He had lost the record for a 3 week gap in 1953 to 1952 Olympic champion Sim Iness, before he made another improvement at a small Pasadena, California all comers track meet. Gordien threw the longest throw of the year while winning the United States Olympic Trials by almost three metres over a 20 year old upstart from the University of Kansas, Al Oerter. The third qualifier at those trials was Ron Drummond, but with almost five months to wait until the Olympics, he gave up his Olympic spot to go to dental school, allowing 4th place Des Koch the opportunity to go to Melbourne.

Fiji made its debut in the men's discus throw. The United States made its 13th appearance, having competed in every edition of the Olympic men's discus throw to date.

== Summary ==
In the qualifying round, Oerter threw 51.19 metres to easily qualify ahead of Commonwealth Games champion Fanie du Plessis and returning silver medalist, 39 year old Adolfo Consolini. The format allowed all who cleared 47 metres to qualify to the finals, Gordien's 47.67 metres made the distance by a little over 2 feet, still he was the twelfth qualifier. The sixteenth and last qualifier into the final was Koch, just 14 cm, less than 6 inches over the minimum.

In the first round of the final, Oerter threw an Olympic record 56.36 m (184 ft 10 in), Gordien 54.75m was second best while Mark Pharaoh held third a meter and a half ahead of Consolini. Those positions held into the third round. With only six going into the final, Koch was in 10th place, needing a big improvement to get into the final. Koch's 53.55m put him into third place. He improved on both his next two attempts to get to 54.40m. In the final round, Pharaoh improved to 54.27m but still 14 cm short of bronze, Gordien improved marginally to 54.81m and Oerter made his third throw of the competition superior to the silver medal throw.

This was the second American sweep of the discus throw (after 1908). Oerter would lead another sweep four years later and would go on to his own sweep, winning the same event four times in a row, an Olympic record.

== Competition format ==
The competition used the two-round format introduced in 1936, with the qualifying round completely separate from the divided final. In qualifying, each athlete received three attempts; those recording a mark of at least 47.00 metres advanced to the final. If fewer than 12 athletes achieved that distance, the top 12 would advance. The results of the qualifying round were then ignored. Finalists received three throws each, with the top six competitors receiving an additional three attempts. The best distance among those six throws counted.

== Records ==
Prior to the competition, the existing world and Olympic records were as follows.

World record	Fortune Gordien (USA)	59.28	Pasadena, United States	22 August 1953
Olympic record	Sim Iness (USA)	55.03	Helsinki, Finland	22 July 1952

Al Oerter set a new Olympic record with his first throw of the final, 56.36 metres. This would hold up as the new record and win the gold medal for him; his fourth throw (55.08 metres) also bettered the old record.

== Schedule ==
All times are Australian Eastern Standard Time (UTC+10)

Date	Time	Round
Wednesday, 27 November 1956	10:00; 15:25	Qualifying; Final

== Results ==
=== Qualifying ===
Rank	Athlete	Nation	1	2	3	Distance	Notes
1	Al Oerter	United States	51.19	—	—	51.19	Q
2	Fanie du Plessis	South Africa	50.69	—	—	50.69	Q
3	Adolfo Consolini	Italy	49.93	—	—	49.93	Q
4	Kim Bukhantsov	Soviet Union	49.65	—	—	49.65	Q
5	Mark Pharaoh	Great Britain	48.98	—	—	48.98	Q
6	Boris Matveyev	Soviet Union	43.62	48.97	—	48.97	Q
7	Erik Uddebom	Sweden	48.44	—	—	48.44	Q
8	Mesulame Rakuro	Fiji	48.21	—	—	48.21	Q
9	Oto Grigalka	Soviet Union	48.11	—	—	48.11	Q
10	Dako Radošević	Yugoslavia	47.93	—	—	47.93	Q
11	Günther Kruse	Argentina	46.28	47.87	—	47.87	Q
12	Fortune Gordien	United States	47.67	—	—	47.67	Q
13	Hernán Haddad	Chile	47.48	—	—	47.48	Q
14	Ferenc Klics	Hungary	47.31	—	—	47.31	Q
15	Gerry Carr	Great Britain	47.15	—	—	47.15	Q
16	Desmond Koch	United States	47.14	—	—	47.14	Q
17	Tadeusz Rut	Poland	42.69	46.62	46.23	46.62	
18	Pierre Alard	France	38.24	46.18	44.36	46.18	
19	Muhammad Ayub	Pakistan	40.93	41.79	44.88	44.88	
20	Vesmonis Balodis	Australia	44.24	X	42.36	44.24	
—	Todor Artarski	Bulgaria	DNS				
—	Barclay Palmer	Great Britain	DNS				

=== Final ===
Rank	Athlete	Nation	1	2	3	4	5	6	Distance	Notes
1st place, gold medalist(s)	Al Oerter	United States	56.36 OR	53.81	53.22	55.08	53.28	54.93	56.36	OR
2nd place, silver medalist(s)	Fortune Gordien	United States	54.75	49.18	51.40	53.84	52.75	54.81	54.81	
3rd place, bronze medalist(s)	Desmond Koch	United States	50.53	X	53.55	53.64	54.40	54.03	54.40	
4	Mark Pharaoh	Great Britain	52.52	X	52.36	49.85	54.27	53.16	54.27	
5	Oto Grigalka	Soviet Union	51.25	50.09	52.37	49.44	X	50.13	52.37	
6	Adolfo Consolini	Italy	51.92	52.21	52.13	X	51.29	52.01	52.21	
7	Ferenc Klics	Hungary	51.75	51.82	51.61	Did not advance			51.82	
8	Dako Radošević	Yugoslavia	50.99	51.26	51.69	Did not advance			51.69	
9	Boris Matveyev	Soviet Union	50.59	49.63	51.38	Did not advance			51.38	
10	Gerry Carr	Great Britain	48.03	50.72	48.98	Did not advance			50.72	
11	Günther Kruse	Argentina	49.12	45.92	49.89	Did not advance			49.89	
12	Kim Bukhantsov	Soviet Union	48.58	47.75	46.86	Did not advance			48.58	
13	Fanie du Plessis	South Africa	48.49	46.23	43.31	Did not advance			48.49	
14	Erik Uddebom	Sweden	48.28	47.89	44.72	Did not advance			48.28	
15	Mesulame Rakuro	Fiji	46.45	47.24	44.60	Did not advance			47.24	
16	Hernán Haddad	Chile	X	46.00	X	Did not advance			46.00	
