= 1950 European Athletics Championships – Men's discus throw =

Men's discus throw at the European Athletics Championships

The men's discus throw at the 1950 European Athletics Championships was held in Brussels, Belgium, at Heysel Stadium on 24 and 26 August 1950.

== Medalists ==
Gold	Adolfo Consolini; Italy
Silver	Giuseppe Tosi; Italy
Bronze	Olli Partanen; Finland

== Results ==
=== Final ===
26 August

Rank	Name	Nationality	Result	Notes
1st place, gold medalist(s)	Adolfo Consolini	Italy	53.75	CR
2nd place, silver medalist(s)	Giuseppe Tosi	Italy	52.31	
3rd place, bronze medalist(s)	Olli Partanen	Finland	48.69	
4	Stein Johnson	Norway	48.55	
5	Arne Hellberg	Sweden	47.37	
6	Alojz Kormúth	Czechoslovakia	46.17	
7	Nikolaos Syllas	Greece	46.14	
8	Jørgen Munk Plum	Denmark	45.93	
9	Danilo Žerjal	Yugoslavia	45.92	

=== Qualification ===
24 August

Rank	Name	Nationality	Result	Notes
1	Adolfo Consolini	Italy	49.63	Q
2	Giuseppe Tosi	Italy	47.99	Q
3	Stein Johnson	Norway	47.62	Q
4	Nikolaos Syllas	Greece	45.60	Q
5	Danilo Žerjal	Yugoslavia	45.27	Q
6	Arne Hellberg	Sweden	44.78	Q
7	Alojz Kormúth	Czechoslovakia	44.64	Q
8	Olli Partanen	Finland	44.33	Q
9	Jørgen Munk Plum	Denmark	44.14	Q
10	Hermann Tunner	Austria	43.90	
11	Gunnar Huseby	Iceland	43.78	
12	Oskar Hafliger	Switzerland	43.39	
13	Clément Mertens	Belgium	42.60	
14	Raymond Kintziger	Belgium	42.46	
15	Tauno Karlsson	Finland	42.46	
16	Jean Darot	France	41.85	
17	Serge Grisoni	France	41.26	
18	José Luis Torres	Spain	38.92	

== Participation ==
According to an unofficial count, 18 athletes from 14 countries participated in the event.

- Austria (1)
- Belgium (2)
- Czechoslovakia (1)
- Denmark (1)
- Finland (2)
- France (2)
- Greece (1)
- Iceland (1)
- Italy (2)
- Norway (1)
- Spain (1)
- Sweden (1)
- Switzerland (1)
- Yugoslavia (1)
