= 1954 European Athletics Championships – Men's shot put =

Men's shot put at the European Athletics Championships

The men's shot put at the 1954 European Athletics Championships was held in Bern, Switzerland, at Stadion Neufeld on 27 August 1954.

== Medalists ==
Gold	Jiří Skobla; Czechoslovakia
Silver	Oto Grigalka; Soviet Union
Bronze	Heino Heinaste; Soviet Union

== Results ==
=== Final ===
27 August

Rank	Name	Nationality	Result	Notes
1st place, gold medalist(s)	Jiří Skobla	Czechoslovakia	17.20	CR
2nd place, silver medalist(s)	Oto Grigalka	Soviet Union	16.69	
3rd place, bronze medalist(s)	Heino Heinaste	Soviet Union	16.27	
4	Roland Nilsson	Sweden	16.17	
5	John Savidge	Great Britain	16.10	
6	Ferenc Kövesdi	Hungary	15.70	
7	Gabriel Georgescu	Romania	15.48	
8	Petar Šarčević	Yugoslavia	15.43	
9	Reijo Koivisto	Finland	15.39	
10	Raymond Thomas	France	15.35	
11	János Mihályfi	Hungary	15.18	
12	Josef Stoklasa	Czechoslovakia	15.13	
13	Yrjö Puntti	Finland	15.02	
14	Erik Uddebom	Sweden	15.01	
15	Edouard Vandezande	Belgium	14.94	
16	Mark Pharaoh	Great Britain	14.65	

=== Qualification ===
27 August

Rank	Name	Nationality	Result	Notes
1	Heino Heinaste	Soviet Union	15.90	Q
2	Jiří Skobla	Czechoslovakia	15.86	Q
3	Oto Grigalka	Soviet Union	15.52	Q
4	John Savidge	Great Britain	15.46	Q
5	Gabriel Georgescu	Romania	15.27	Q
6	Reijo Koivisto	Finland	15.15	Q
7	Petar Šarčević	Yugoslavia	15.12	Q
8	Josef Stoklasa	Czechoslovakia	15.09	Q
9	Raymond Thomas	France	15.09	Q
10	Roland Nilsson	Sweden	14.92	Q
11	Erik Uddebom	Sweden	14.83	Q
12	Ferenc Kövesdi	Hungary	14.82	Q
13	János Mihályfi	Hungary	14.72	Q
14	Yrjö Puntti	Finland	14.67	Q
15	Edouard Vandezande	Belgium	14.51	Q
16	Mark Pharaoh	Great Britain	14.50	Q
17	Lucien Guillier	France	14.43	
18	Skúli Thorarensen	Iceland	14.35	
19	Alois Schwabl	Austria	14.14	
20	Max Hubacher	Switzerland	14.13	
21	Konstantinos Giataganas	Greece	14.01	
22	Nuri Turan	Turkey	13.74	
23	Willy Senn	Switzerland	13.70	
24	Willy Wuyts	Belgium	13.64	

== Participation ==
According to an unofficial count, 24 athletes from 15 countries participated in the event.

- Austria (1)
- Belgium (2)
- Czechoslovakia (2)
- Finland (2)
- France (2)
- Greece (1)
- Hungary (2)
- Iceland (1)
- Romania (1)
- Soviet Union (2)
- Sweden (2)
- Switzerland (2)
- Turkey (1)
- Great Britain (2)
- Yugoslavia (1)
