= 1954 European Athletics Championships – Men's discus throw =

Men's discus throw at the European Athletics Championships

The men's discus throw at the 1954 European Athletics Championships was held in Bern, Switzerland, at Stadion Neufeld on 26 and 28 August 1954.

== Medalists ==
Gold	Adolfo Consolini; Italy
Silver	Giuseppe Tosi; Italy
Bronze	József Szécsényi; Hungary

== Results ==
=== Final ===
28 August

Rank	Name	Nationality	Result	Notes
1st place, gold medalist(s)	Adolfo Consolini	Italy	53.44	
2nd place, silver medalist(s)	Giuseppe Tosi	Italy	52.34	
3rd place, bronze medalist(s)	József Szécsényi	Hungary	51.58	
4	Ferenc Klics	Hungary	51.43	
5	Roland Nilsson	Sweden	50.97	
6	Oto Grigalka	Soviet Union	50.60	
7	Vitomir Krivokapić	Yugoslavia	48.79	
8	Jan Vrabel	Czechoslovakia	48.76	
9	Karl Oweger	West Germany	48.23	
10	Mark Pharaoh	Great Britain	47.79	
11	Carol Lindroos	Finland	46.21	
12	Heino Heinaste	Soviet Union	46.09	
13	Günther Noack	West Germany	44.94	

=== Qualification ===
26 August

Rank	Name	Nationality	Result	Notes
1	Adolfo Consolini	Italy	50.93	Q
2	Roland Nilsson	Sweden	50.50	Q
3	József Szécsényi	Hungary	50.15	Q
4	Oto Grigalka	Soviet Union	49.23	Q
5	Heino Heinaste	Soviet Union	48.78	Q
6	Giuseppe Tosi	Italy	48.40	Q
7	Jan Vrabel	Czechoslovakia	47.91	Q
8	Vitomir Krivokapić	Yugoslavia	47.74	Q
9	Ferenc Klics	Hungary	47.38	Q
10	Karl Oweger	West Germany	46.93	Q
11	Mark Pharaoh	Great Britain	46.32	Q
12	Günther Noack	West Germany	46.25	Q
13	Carol Lindroos	Finland	45.05	Q
14	Jean Darot	France	44.49	
15	Konstantinos Giataganas	Greece	44.31	
16	Oskar Hafliger	Switzerland	43.85	
17	Joop Fikkert	Netherlands	43.52	
18	Manuel Silva	Portugal	42.99	
19	Hallgrímur Jónsson	Iceland	42.90	
20	Antonios Kounadis	Greece	42.79	
21	Nuri Turan	Turkey	42.05	
22	Mathias Mehr	Switzerland	41.14	
23	Oskar Ospelt	Liechtenstein	33.14	

== Participation ==
According to an unofficial count, 23 athletes from 17 countries participated in the event.

- Czechoslovakia (1)
- Finland (1)
- France (1)
- Greece (2)
- Hungary (2)
- Iceland (1)
- Italy (2)
- Liechtenstein (1)
- Netherlands (1)
- Portugal (1)
- Soviet Union (2)
- Sweden (1)
- Switzerland (2)
- Turkey (1)
- Great Britain (1)
- West Germany (2)
- Yugoslavia (1)
