= 1946 European Athletics Championships – Men's discus throw =

Men's discus throw at the European Athletics Championships

The men's discus throw at the 1946 European Athletics Championships was held in Oslo, Norway, at Bislett Stadion on 24 August 1946.

== Medalists ==
Gold	Adolfo Consolini; Italy
Silver	Giuseppe Tosi; Italy
Bronze	Veikko Nyqvist; Finland

== Results ==
=== Final ===
24 August

Rank	Name	Nationality	Result	Notes
1st place, gold medalist(s)	Adolfo Consolini	Italy	53.23	
2nd place, silver medalist(s)	Giuseppe Tosi	Italy	50.39	
3rd place, bronze medalist(s)	Veikko Nyqvist	Finland	48.14	
4	Nikolaos Syllas	Greece	47.96	
5	Stein Johnson	Norway	46.77	
6	Erik Westlin	Sweden	45.65	
7	Bengt Wikner	Sweden	44.57	
8	Raymond Tissot	France	44.11	

=== Qualification ===
24 August

Rank	Name	Nationality	Result	Notes
1	Adolfo Consolini	Italy	53.29	CR, Q
2	Giuseppe Tosi	Italy	50.03	Q
3	Nikolaos Syllas	Greece	47.67	Q
4	Veikko Nyqvist	Finland	46.98	Q
5	Bengt Wikner	Sweden	46.96	Q
6	Erik Westlin	Sweden	46.47	Q
7	Stein Johnson	Norway	45.61	Q
8	Raymond Tissot	France	44.90	Q
9	René Bazennerie	France	44.72	
10	Danilo Žerjal	Yugoslavia	44.31	
11	Jaroslav Knotek	Czechoslovakia	44.23	
12	Johan Nordby	Norway	43.33	
13	Jón Ólafsson	Iceland	42.40	
14	Gunnar Huseby	Iceland	41.74	
15	Roger Verhas	Belgium	40.88	
16	Oskar Ospelt	Liechtenstein	38.35	

== Participation ==
According to an unofficial count, 16 athletes from 11 countries participated in the event.

- Belgium (1)
- Czechoslovakia (1)
- Finland (1)
- France (2)
- Greece (1)
- Iceland (2)
- Italy (2)
- Liechtenstein (1)
- Norway (2)
- Sweden (2)
- Yugoslavia (1)
