= Athletics at the 1952 Summer Olympics – Men's shot put =

Men's shot put at the Games of the XV Olympiad
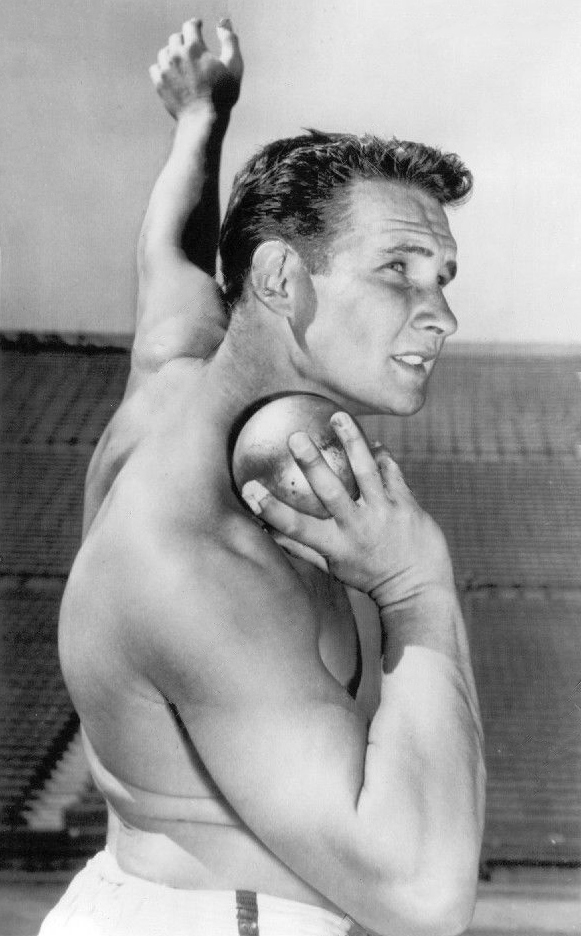
- Parry O'Brien in 1954
- Venue: Helsinki Olympic Stadium
- Dates: 21 July 1952 (qualifying and final)
- Competitors: 20 from 14 nations
- Winning distance: 17.41 OR

Medalists
1st place, gold medalist(s)		Parry O'Brien; United States
2nd place, silver medalist(s)		Darrow Hooper; United States
3rd place, bronze medalist(s)		Jim Fuchs; United States

Video on YouTube amateur film

The men's shot put event was part of the track and field athletics programme at the 1952 Summer Olympics in Helsinki, Finland. Twenty athletes from 14 nations competed. The maximum number of athletes per nation had been set at 3 since the 1930 Olympic Congress. The competition was held on 21 July at Helsinki Olympic Stadium. The finals were swept by the United States, with Americans Parry O'Brien taking the gold medal, Darrow Hooper earning silver and Jim Fuchs receiving his second consecutive bronze medal in the event. It was the 10th victory for an American in the event, and the fifth medal sweep for the United States. Fuchs was the third man to win multiple medals in the shot put.

== Summary ==
While recuperating from surgery to deal with a knee injury, Fuchs developed a technique he called "the sideways glide" which enabled him to compete without pain and gain greater distance on his tosses. Fuchs, who was the world record holder at the time of the games, was nursing a pulled ligament in his right hand, which interfered with his ability to compete. In the years after his bronze medal performance at the 1948 Summer Olympics in London, Fuchs was the best shot putter in the world, winning 88 consecutive meets and setting four world records in a stretch of 14 months.

Using a technique that became known as the "O'Brien glide", Parry O'Brien broke Fuchs's consecutive meet winning streak and started a streak of his own that ran from July 1952 to June 1956 in which he won 116 consecutive meets and set 17 world records, in addition to becoming the first person to break through the distances of 18 meters, 60 feet and 19 meters. Parry would go on to repeat his gold medal performance at the 1956 Summer Olympics in Melbourne and win a silver medal at the 1960 Summer Olympics in Rome, before falling just out of the medals in the 1964 Summer Olympics in Tokyo.

Hooper beat both O'Brien and Fuchs in the 1952 Final Trials with a throw of 17.41m (57–1 5/8), a distance that would have won him a gold medal if he had been able to repeat it in Helsinki In the first round of the final O'Brien reached a distance of 17.41 (57–1 1/2), which gave him the lead, holding on until the final round when Hooper's 17.39 (57–0 3/4) put him just two centimeters short of a gold medal.

== Background ==
This was the 12th appearance of the event, which is one of 12 athletics events to have been held at every Summer Olympics. Returning finalists from the 1948 Games were bronze medalist Jim Fuchs of the United States, ninth-place finisher Konstantinos Giataganas of Greece, and eleventh-place finisher John Giles of Great Britain. The American team was favored to repeat its medal sweep of 1948, with Fuchs (now the world record holder), Parry O'Brien, and Darrow Hooper all within two inches of each other at the U.S. trials, with Hooper winning at 17.41 metres.

Puerto Rico and the Soviet Union each made their debut in the men's shot put. The United States appeared for the 12th time, the only nation to have competed in all Olympic shot put competitions to date.

== Competition format ==
The competition used the two-round format introduced in 1936, with the qualifying round completely separate from the divided final. In qualifying, each athlete received three attempts; those recording a mark of at least 14.60 metres advanced to the final. If fewer than 12 athletes achieved that distance, the top 12 would advance. The results of the qualifying round were then ignored. Finalists received three throws each, with the top six competitors receiving an additional three attempts. The best distance among those six throws counted.

== Records ==
Prior to the competition, the existing world and Olympic records were as follows.

World record	Jim Fuchs (USA)	17.95	Eskilstuna, Sweden	22 August 1950
Olympic record	Jim Delaney (USA)	17.12	London, United Kingdom	3 August 1948

Parry O'Brien broke the Olympic record with his first throw of the final, at 17.41 metres. This was the best throw of the day, though O'Brien's second throw (17.21 metres) and Darrow Hooper's final throw (17.39 metres) also exceeded the old record.

== Schedule ==
All times are Eastern European Summer Time (UTC+3)

Date	Time	Round
Monday, 21 July 1952	10:00; 15:00	Qualifying; Final

== Results ==
=== Qualifying round ===
Qualification: Qualifying Performance 14.60 (Q) advance to the final.

Rank	Athlete	Nation	1	2	3	Distance	Notes
1	Parry O'Brien	United States	16.05	—	—	16.05	Q
2	Oto Grigalka	Soviet Union	15.90	—	—	15.90	Q
3	Roland Nilsson	Sweden	15.81	—	—	15.81	Q
4	Darrow Hooper	United States	15.48	—	—	15.48	Q
5	Jim Fuchs	United States	15.29	—	—	15.29	Q
5	Jiří Skobla	Czechoslovakia	15.29	—	—	15.29	Q
7	Georgy Fyodorov	Soviet Union	15.16	—	—	15.16	Q
8	Per Stavem	Norway	14.45	14.54	15.12	15.12	Q
9	Alois Schwabl	Austria	15.00	—	—	15.00	Q
10	Angiolo Profeti	Italy	14.93	—	—	14.93	Q
11	Tadeusz Krzyżanowski	Poland	14.11	14.90	—	14.90	Q
12	John Savidge	Great Britain	14.89	—	—	14.89	Q
13	Lucien Guillier	France	14.13	X	14.62	14.62	Q
14	Aapo Perko	Finland	14.23	14.50	14.26	14.50	
15	Toivo Telen	Finland	13.78	14.30	X	14.30	
16	Ramón Rosario	Puerto Rico	14.21	14.00	13.94	14.21	
17	Kaarto Rask	Finland	14.08	13.81	13.80	14.08	
18	Konstantinos Giataganas	Greece	12.06	14.05	X	14.05	
19	John Giles	Great Britain	13.73	13.70	X	13.73	
20	Nuri Turan	Turkey	13.00	X	X	13.00	
—	Friðrik Guðmundsson	Iceland	DNS				
—	Mieczysław Łomowski	Poland	DNS				
—	Gino Roy Pella	Canada	DNS				
—	Aristeidis Roubanis	Greece	DNS				

=== Final ===
Rank	Athlete	Nation	1	2	3	4	5	6	Distance	Notes
1st place, gold medalist(s)	Parry O'Brien	United States	17.41 OR	17.21	16.79	16.87	17.12	16.53	17.41	OR
2nd place, silver medalist(s)	Darrow Hooper	United States	17.02	16.59	17.08	16.90	16.93	17.39	17.39	
3rd place, bronze medalist(s)	Jim Fuchs	United States	16.93	X	X	X	17.06	X	17.06	
4	Oto Grigalka	Soviet Union	16.53	16.78	15.91	16.27	16.29	16.33	16.78	
5	Roland Nilsson	Sweden	16.55	16.08	16.33	X	X	X	16.55	
6	John Savidge	Great Britain	16.17	16.18	X	16.19	16.03	X	16.19	
7	Georgy Fyodorov	Soviet Union	15.98	16.01	16.06	Did not advance			16.06	
8	Per Stavem	Norway	15.14	16.02	15.31	Did not advance			16.02	
9	Jiří Skobla	Czechoslovakia	15.73	15.60	15.92	Did not advance			15.92	
10	Tadeusz Krzyżanowski	Poland	15.08	14.57	14.32	Did not advance			15.08	
11	Lucien Guillier	France	13.94	14.46	14.84	Did not advance			14.84	
12	Angiolo Profeti	Italy	14.59	14.00	14.74	Did not advance			14.74	
13	Alois Schwabl	Austria	14.43	14.20	14.45	Did not advance			14.45	
