= Fortune Gordien =

American athlete (1922–1990)

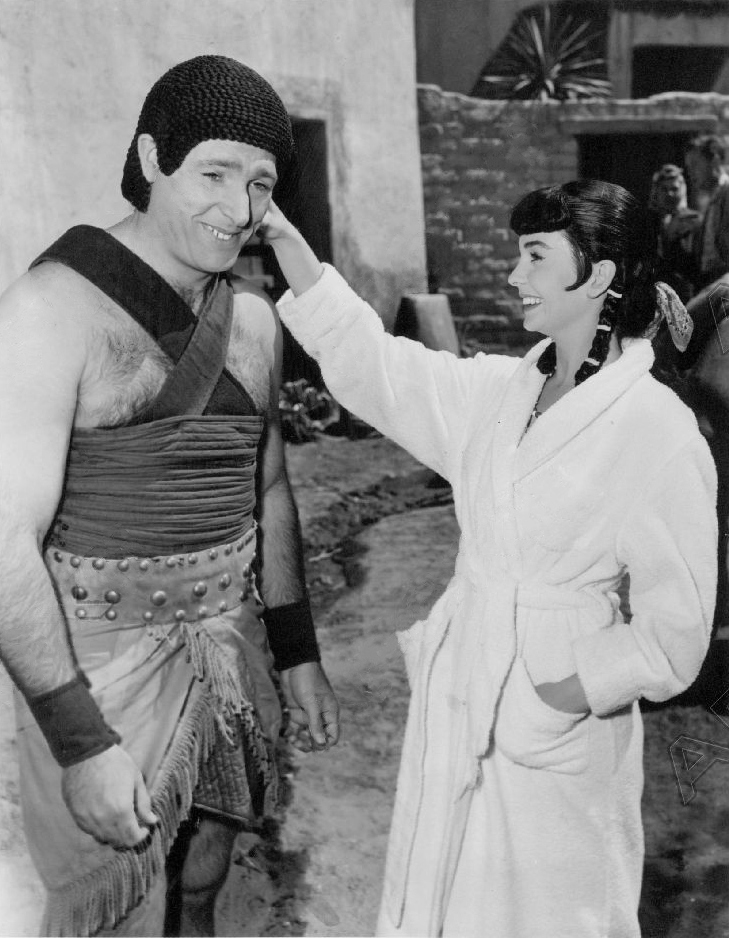
- Gordien, in costume for film The Egyptian, with Jean Simmons in 1954

Personal information
- Born: September 9, 1922 Spokane, Washington, U.S.
- Died: April 10, 1990 (aged 67) Fontana, California, U.S.
- Education: University of Minnesota
- Height: 6 ft 0 in (184 cm)
- Weight: 229 lb (104 kg)

Sport
- Sport: Athletics
- Events: Discus throw, shot put
- Club: Southern California Striders

Achievements and titles
- Personal bests: DT – 59.28 m (1953); SP – 16.51 m (1947)
Medal record
Representing the United States
Olympic Games
Bronze medal – third place	1948 London	Discus throw
Silver medal – second place	1956 Melbourne	Discus throw
Pan American Games
Gold medal – first place	1955 Mexico City	Discus throw
Silver medal – second place	1955 Mexico City	Shot put

Fortune Everett Gordien (September 9, 1922 – April 10, 1990) was an American discus thrower and shot putter who set four world records in the discus throw. He competed in this event at the 1948, 1952 and 1956 Olympics and placed third, fourth and second, respectively. At the 1955 Pan American Games he won a gold medal in the discus and a silver in the shot put.

Domestically Gordien won six AAU and three NCAA titles. According to the Guinness Book of Track and Field: Facts and Feats, the smallest crowd ever to see a world record may have been 48, the number attending a Pasadena, California all-comers track meet in 1953 when Gordien set his last world record that stood for six years.

Gordien grew up in Minneapolis, graduating from Roosevelt High School, and attended the University of Minnesota. His coach there, Jim Kelly, also became coach of the U.S. track-and-field team for the 1956 Summer Olympics, where Gordien won a silver medal.

In the 1950s, Gordien had a few minor roles in films and TV series, including The Cisco Kid (1950), The Egyptian (1954), Not for Hire (1959) and North to Alaska (1960).

Gordien was a coach at San Bernardino Valley College.

== Masters ==
July 1968 Gordien competed in the first Masters National Outdoor Track and Field Championship held in San Diego, winning the DT. June 1970 Gordien (47) set the Masters M45 record in the discus at 167'-8". April 1973 Gordien (50) once again set a Masters Record in the discus at 177'-9" (Mt Sac Relays). and

Records
Preceded by (Italy) Adolfo Consolini	Men's Discus World Record Holder; July 9, 1949 – June 20, 1953	Succeeded by (United States) Sim Iness
Preceded by (United States) Sim Iness	Men's Discus World Record Holder; July 11, 1953 – June 14, 1959	Succeeded by (Poland) Edmund Piątkowski
