= 1950 European Athletics Championships – Men's shot put =

Men's shot put at the European Athletics Championships

The men's shot put at the 1950 European Athletics Championships was held in Brussels, Belgium, at Heysel Stadium on 25 August 1950.

The winning margin was 1.58 metres which with the conclusion of the 2024 championships remains the only time the men's shot put has been won by more than 1.3 metres at these championships.

== Medalists ==
Gold	Gunnar Huseby; Iceland
Silver	Angiolo Profeti; Italy
Bronze	Otto Grigalka; Soviet Union

== Results ==
=== Final ===
25 August

Rank	Name	Nationality	Result	Notes
1st place, gold medalist(s)	Gunnar Huseby	Iceland	16.74	CR NR
2nd place, silver medalist(s)	Angiolo Profeti	Italy	15.16	
3rd place, bronze medalist(s)	Otto Grigalka	Soviet Union	15.14	
4	Willy Senn	Switzerland	14.95	
5	Petar Sarcevic	Yugoslavia	14.90	
6	Vladimír Jirout	Czechoslovakia	14.89	
7	John Savidge	Great Britain	14.69	
8	John Giles	Great Britain	14.29	
9	Gösta Arvidsson	Sweden	14.17	

=== Qualification ===
25 August

Rank	Name	Nationality	Result	Notes
1	Gunnar Huseby	Iceland	16.29	CR Q
2	John Savidge	Great Britain	15.54	Q
3	Otto Grigalka	Soviet Union	15.45	Q
4	Vladimír Jirout	Czechoslovakia	15.23	Q
5	Petar Sarcevic	Yugoslavia	15.18	Q
6	Angiolo Profeti	Italy	14.95	Q
7	Willy Senn	Switzerland	14.79	Q
8	Gösta Arvidsson	Sweden	14.57	Q
9	John Giles	Great Britain	14.52	Q
10	Konstantinos Giataganas	Greece	14.49	
11	Roger Verhas	Belgium	14.37	
12	Willy Wuyts	Belgium	13.28	
13	Jean Darot	France	13.12	

== Participation ==
According to an unofficial count, 13 athletes from 11 countries participated in the event.

- Belgium (2)
- Czechoslovakia (1)
- France (1)
- Greece (1)
- Iceland (1)
- Italy (1)
- Soviet Union (1)
- Sweden (1)
- Switzerland (1)
- Great Britain (2)
- Yugoslavia (1)
