= Athletics at the 1948 Summer Olympics – Men's discus throw =

Men's discus throw at the Games of the XIV Olympiad
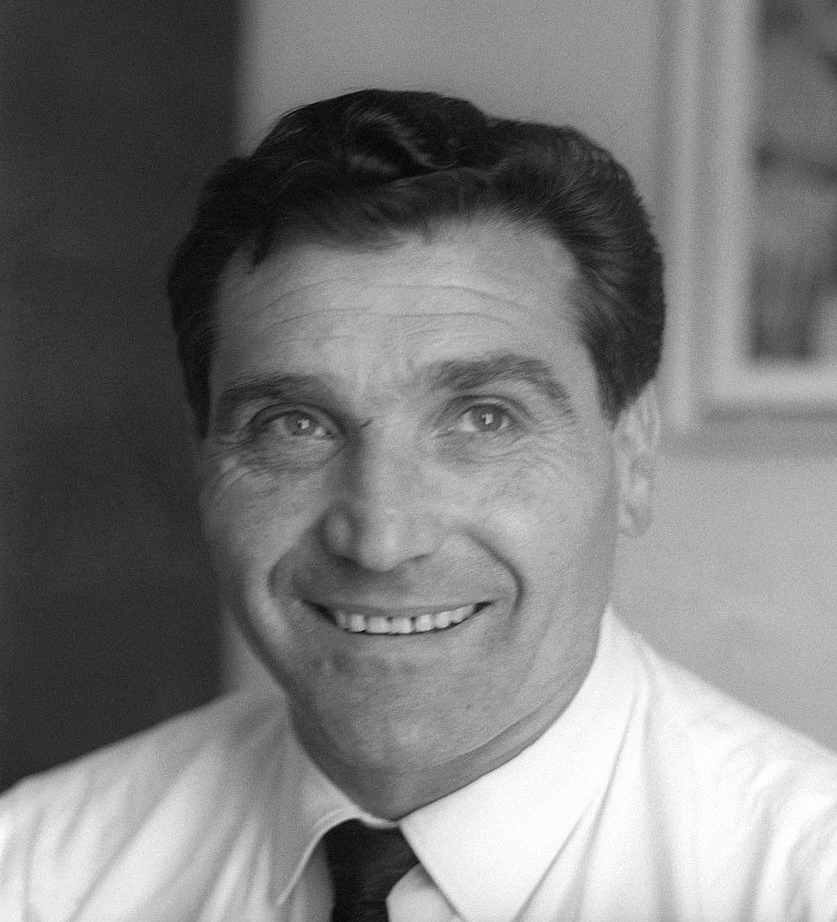
- Adolfo Consolini
- Venue: Wembley Stadium
- Date: August 2, 1948 (qualifying and final)
- Competitors: 28 from 18 nations
- Winning distance: 52.78 OR

Medalists
1st place, gold medalist(s)		Adolfo Consolini; Italy
2nd place, silver medalist(s)		Giuseppe Tosi; Italy
3rd place, bronze medalist(s)		Fortune Gordien; United States

The men's discus throw event was part of the track and field athletics programme at the 1948 Summer Olympics. Twenty-eight athletes from 18 nations competed. The maximum number of athletes per nation had been set at 3 since the 1930 Olympic Congress. The competition was held on August 2. The final was won by Adolfo Consolini of Italy. It was the nation's first victory in the men's discus throw; Italy had previously taken bronze in 1936. Giuseppe Tosi earned silver to put Italy in the top two places. Fortune Gordien of the United States won bronze, keeping the Americans on the podium in each appearance of the men's discus throw to date.

== Background ==
This was the 11th appearance of the event, which is one of 12 athletics events to have been held at every Summer Olympics. The returning finalists from the 1936 Games were bronze medalist Giorgio Oberweger of Italy and sixth-place finisher Nikolaos Syllas of Greece. Oberweger's teammates, Adolfo Consolini (who had held the world record until 1946, and would take it back later in 1948) and Giuseppe Tosi, were the favorites after finishing first and second in the European championships. The biggest challenger outside of Italy was American Fortune Gordien, the 1947 and 1948 AAU champion. World record holder and inventor of the Minnesota Whip technique Bob Fitch was unable to attend the Games.

South Korea, Pakistan, and Peru each made their debut in the men's discus throw. The United States made its 11th appearance, having competed in every edition of the Olympic men's discus throw to date.

== Competition format ==
The competition used the two-round format introduced in 1936, with the qualifying round completely separate from the divided final. In qualifying, each athlete received three attempts; those recording a mark of at least 46.00 metres advanced to the final. If fewer than 12 athletes achieved that distance, the top 12 would advance. The results of the qualifying round were then ignored. Finalists received three throws each, with the top six competitors receiving an additional three attempts. The best distance among those six throws counted.

== Records ==
Prior to the competition, the existing world and Olympic records were as follows.

World record	Bob Fitch (USA)	54.93	Minneapolis, United States	8 June 1946
Olympic record	Ken Carpenter (USA)	50.48	Berlin, Germany	5 August 1936

Adolfo Consolini and Giuseppe Tosi both beat the Olympic record in the qualifying round, with Consolini's throw going 51.08 metres. Tosi's first throw in the final bettered that, at 51.78 metres. Consolini responded with a 52.78 metres throw in the second set. The bronze medalist, Fortune Gordien, also exceeded the old record.

== Schedule ==
All times are British Summer Time (UTC+1)

Date	Time	Round
Monday, 2 August 1948	11:00; 15:30	Qualifying; Final

== Results ==
=== Qualifying round ===
Qual. rule: qualification standard 46.00m (Q) or at least best 12 qualified (q). Individual throw results are not known, though Consolini and Tosi's qualifying throws were on the first attempt. Frank fouled on his first and third throws.

Rank	Athlete	Nation	Distance	Notes
1	Adolfo Consolini	Italy	51.08	Q, OR
2	Giuseppe Tosi	Italy	50.56	Q
3	Fortune Gordien	United States	48.40	Q
4	Veikko Nyqvist	Finland	47.75	Q
5	Ivar Ramstad	Norway	47.34	Q
6	Nikolaos Syllas	Greece	47.03	Q
7	Ferenc Klics	Hungary	46.65	Q
8	Stein Johnson	Norway	46.54	Q
9	Uno Fransson	Sweden	45.99	q
10	Hermann Tunner	Austria	45.92	q
11	Eduardo Julve	Peru	45.86	q
12	Arvo Huutoniemi	Finland	44.77	q
13	Bill Burton	United States	43.78	
14	Félix Erauzquin	Spain	43.66	
15	Giorgio Oberweger	Italy	43.13	
16	Danilo Žerjal	Yugoslavia	43.07	
17	Manuel Consiglieri	Peru	43.01	
18	Emilio Malchiodi	Argentina	42.98	
19	James Nesbitt	Great Britain	42.09	
20	Vic Frank	United States	42.00	
21	Jack Brewer	Great Britain	41.95	
22	Cummin Clancy	Ireland	40.73	
23	Eric Coy	Canada	39.53	
24	Roger Verhaes	Belgium	39.14	
25	Laurence Reavell-Carter	Great Britain	38.04	
26	Nazar Muhammad Khan Malik	Pakistan	36.23	
26	Ahmed Zahur Khan	Pakistan	36.23	
—	An Yeong-han	South Korea	No mark	
—	Aad de Bruyn	Netherlands	DNS	
—	José Carvahal	Spain	DNS	
—	Gin Gang-hwan	South Korea	DNS	
—	Ignace Heinrich	France	DNS	
—	Raymond Kirstetter	France	DNS	
—	Mieczysław Łomowski	Poland	DNS	
—	José Luis Torres	Spain	DNS	

=== Final ===
Rank	Athlete	Nation	1	2	3	4	5	6	Distance	Notes
1st place, gold medalist(s)	Adolfo Consolini	Italy	49.67	52.78 OR	47.94	X	50.51	50.43	52.78	OR
2nd place, silver medalist(s)	Giuseppe Tosi	Italy	51.78 OR	48.81	50.11	50.09	X	51.18	51.78	
3rd place, bronze medalist(s)	Fortune Gordien	United States	47.95	49.20	50.77	X	48.74	X	50.77	
4	Ivar Ramstad	Norway	Unknown						49.21	
5	Ferenc Klics	Hungary	Unknown						48.21	
6	Veikko Nyqvist	Finland	Unknown						47.33	
7	Nikolaos Syllas	Greece	Unknown			Did not advance			47.25	
8	Stein Johnson	Norway	Unknown			Did not advance			46.54	
9	Arvo Huutoniemi	Finland	Unknown			Did not advance			45.28	
10	Uno Fransson	Sweden	Unknown			Did not advance			45.25	
11	Hermann Tunner	Austria	Unknown			Did not advance			44.43	
12	Eduardo Julve	Peru	Unknown			Did not advance			44.05	
