= Tunner =

Tunner is a surname. Notable people with the surname include:

- Hermann Tunner (1913–1985), Austrian athlete
- William H. Tunner (1906–1983), American Air Force officer
