= Laurence Reavell-Carter =

British discus thrower

Personal information
- Born: 27 August 1914 Brentford, England
- Died: 4 October 1985 (aged 71) Hastings, England

Sport
- Sport: Athletics
- Event: Discus
- Club: Reading University AC/ Milocarian AC/ Royal Air Force

Laurence Reavell-Carter CBE (27 August 1914 – 4 October 1985) was an English discus thrower who competed at two Olympic Games.

== Biography ==
Reavell-Carter was born in Brentford. He finished second behind Bernarr Prendergast in the discus throw event at the 1936 AAA Championships.

One month later he was selected to represent Great Britain at the 1936 Summer Olympics held in Berlin, where he was eliminated during the qualifying of the discus competition.

Reavell-Carter returned to competition after World War II and finished third behind Cummin Clancy at the 1948 AAA Championships. Shortly afterwards he represented the Great Britain team at the 1948 Olympic Games in London, where he participated in the discus throw event finishing 25th.

Reavell-Carter was a Wing Commander of the Royal Air Force, and was decorated Commander of the Order of the British Empire.
