= Jack Brewer (discus thrower) =

British discus thrower

Personal information
- Nationality: British (English)
- Born: 21 October 1914 Macclesfield, England
- Died: 16 July 1993 (aged 78) Sutton, England

Sport
- Sport: Athletics
- Event: Discus throw
- Club: Old Rutlishians

Ernest John Aisne Brewer also known as Jack Brewer (21 October 1914 – 16 July 1993) was a British athlete who competed at the 1948 Summer Olympics.

== Biography ==
Brewer was educated at Rutlish Grammar School and Goldsmiths, University of London. Before World War II he won the Surrey county title in 1936.

Brewer finished third behind Jan Brasser in the discus throw event at the 1947 AAA Championships.

At the 1948 AAA Championships Brewer finished second behind Cummin Clancy but by virtue of being the best place British athlete was considered the British discus throw champion. Shortly afterwards he represented the Great Britain team at the 1948 Olympic Games in London, in the men's discus throw competition.

In 1958, Brewer, aschoolteacher by trade, set a personal best of 46.18 metres and from 1936 to 1961 won a medal at every Surrey Championship.
