= Giuseppe Tosi =

Italian discus thrower

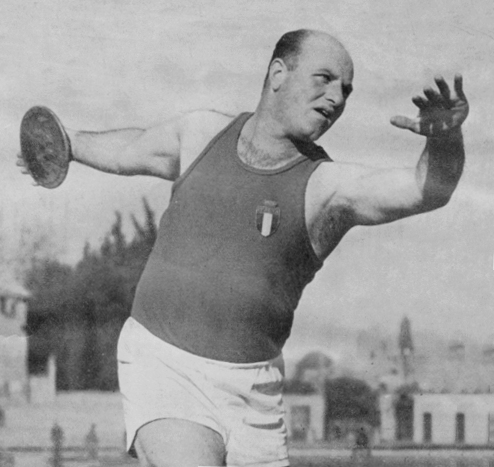

Personal information
- Nationality: Italian
- Born: 25 May 1916 Borgo Ticino, Kingdom of Italy
- Died: 10 July 1981 (aged 65)
- Height: 1.93 m (6 ft 4 in)
- Weight: 125 kg (276 lb)

Sport
- Country: Italy
- Sport: Athletics
- Event: Discus throw
- Club: SS Giovinezza

Achievements and titles
- Personal best: 54.80 m (1948)
Medal record
Men's athletics
Representing Italy
Olympic Games
Silver medal – second place	1948 London	Discus throw
European Championships
Silver medal – second place	1946 Oslo	Discus throw
Silver medal – second place	1950 Brussels	Discus throw
Silver medal – second place	1954 Bern	Discus throw
Mediterranean Games
Gold medal – first place	1951 Alexandria	Discus throw

Giuseppe "Beppe" Tosi (25 May 1916 – 10 July 1981) was an Italian discus thrower. He won silver medal at the 1946, 1950 and 1954 European championships and 1948 Summer Olympics, every time beaten by the teammate Adolfo Consolini. At the 1952 Summer Olympics, Tosi placed eighth and Consolini second.

== Biography ==
Tosi won five national titles, in 1943, 1946–1948 and 1951, and set two European records, both in 1948.

Tosi won the British AAA Championships title in the discus throw event at the 1951 AAA Championships.

Near the end of his athletic career, similar to Consolini, he went into acting and played minute roles in several major films, including Totò al giro d'Italia (1948), Quo Vadis (1951), The Return of Don Camillo (1953), Ben-Hur (1959) and The Lovemakers (1961).

== Achievements ==
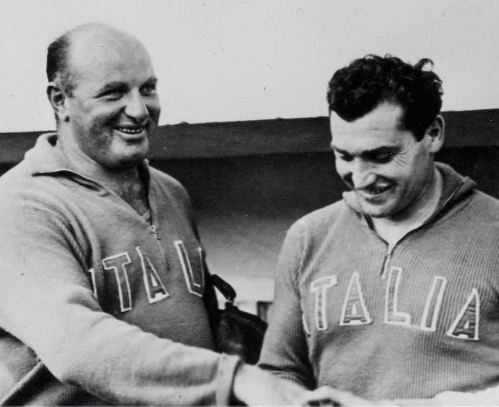
Giuseppe Tosi and Adolfo Consolini

Year	Competition	Venue	Position	Event	Performance	Notes
1948	Olympic Games	(United Kingdom) London	2nd	Discus throw	51.78 m	
1952	Olympic Games	(Finland) Helsinki	8th	Discus throw	49.03 m	

== Filmography ==
Year	Title	Role	Notes
1951	Quo Vadis	Wrestler	Uncredited
1959	Ben-Hur	Chariot driver	Uncredited
1961	The Lovemakers	Old Casamonti	Uncredited, (final film role)

Records
Preceded by (Italy) Adolfo Consolini	Men's Discus European Record Holder; 22 August 1948 – 18 September 1948	Succeeded by (Italy) Adolfo Consolini
