= Athletics at the 1957 World University Games – Men's shot put =

The men's shot put event at the 1957 World University Games was held at the Stadium Charlety in Paris with the final on 6 September 1957.

== Medalists ==
Gold	Silver	Bronze
Vartan Ovsepyan; Soviet Union	Josef Klik; West Germany	Jean-Pierre Lassau; France

== Results ==
=== Final ===
Rank	Name	Nationality	#1	#2	#3	#4	#5	#6	Result	Notes
1st place, gold medalist(s)	Vartan Ovsepyan	Soviet Union	15.71	16.20	16.38	16.57	16.39	16.09	16.57	
2nd place, silver medalist(s)	Josef Klik	West Germany	14.92	15.34	15.41	15.04	15.81	15.91	15.91	
3rd place, bronze medalist(s)	Jean-Pierre Lassau	France	15.86	15.89	15.84	15.44	15.22	?	15.89	
4	Raymond Thomas	France	15.39	x	15.21	15.47	15.48	15.55	15.55	
5	Todor Artarski Todorov	Bulgaria	14.89	14.80	14.69	14.66	15.12	14.86	15.12	
6	Piero Monguzzi	Italy	15.00	14.12	14.25				15.00	
7	Helmut Huber	West Germany							14.33	
8	Ronald Taylor	Ireland							14.28	
9	Le Maître	Belgium							14.12	
10	Alfonso Vidal	Spain							13.98	
11	Venc	Czechoslovakia							13.09	
12	Northern	Great Britain							12.91	
	Estanislao Quadra	Spain	x	x	x				NM	
