= Gerry Carr =

British athlete (1936–2019)

Personal information
- Nationality: British (English)
- Born: 1 February 1936 London, England
- Died: 3 November 2019 (aged 83) British Columbia, Canada
- Height: 189 cm (6 ft 2 in)
- Weight: 99 kg (218 lb)

Sport
- Sport: Athletics
- Event: Discus throw / shot put
- Club: Woodford Green AC
Medal record
Athletics
Representing England
British Empire & Commonwealth Games
Bronze medal – third place	1958 Cardiff	discus

Gerald Anthony Carr (1 February 1936 – 3 November 2019) was a British athlete who competed at the 1956 Summer Olympics.

== Biography ==
Carr was educated at Wanstead Grammar School and Loughborough College, although in between he did his National Service with the Royal Air Force.

He took a UCLA scholarship in the United States, taking a degree in English and teaching classes in physical education.

Carr finished second behind Mark Pharaoh in the discus throw event at the 1955 AAA Championships and the 1956 AAA Championships.

Later that year he represented Great Britain at the 1956 Olympic Games in Melbourne, where he participated in the men's discus throw competition.

Once again Carr finished second in the AAA Championships but this time behind Mike Lindsay at the 1957 AAA Championships before a third place finish at the 1958 AAA Championships. However, as the best placed British athlete in 1958, he was finally the British discus throw champion.

He was selected for the England athletics team and won a bronze medal in the discus at the 1958 British Empire and Commonwealth Games in Cardiff, Wales.

In 1967 he worked at the University of Victoria in Canada, initially teaching history of the Ancient and Modern Olympic Games and then biomechanics, retiring in 2001. After retirement he lived on Vancouver Island.
