= Westlin =

Westlin is a surname. Notable people with this surname include:

- Bonnie Westlin (born c. 1962), American lawyer and politician
- Daniel Westlin (born 1980), Swedish football striker
- Erik Westlin (1913–1977), Swedish discus thrower
