= An Yeong-han =

South Korean discus thrower (born 1917)

Personal information
- Nationality: South Korean
- Born: 27 November 1917
- Died: 22 July 2005 (aged 87) Seoul

Sport
- Sport: Athletics
- Event: Discus throw

Korean name
- Hangul: 안영한
- Hanja: 安永漢
- RR: An Yeonghan
- MR: An Yŏnghan

An Yeong-han (27 November 1917 – 22 July 2005) was a South Korean athlete. He competed in the men's discus throw at the 1948 Summer Olympics.
