= Gunnar Huseby =

Icelandic track and field athlete

Personal information
- Nationality: Icelandic
- Born: 4 November 1923
- Died: 28 May 1995 (aged 71)

Sport
- Sport: Athletics
- Event: shot put/discus
Medal record
Men's athletics
Representing Iceland
European Championships
Gold medal – first place	1946 Oslo	Shot put
Gold medal – first place	1950 Brussels	Shot put

Gunnar Alexander Huseby (4 November 1923 – 28 May 1995) was an Icelandic track and field athlete who competed in the shot put and discus throw events.

== Biography ==
Huseby won consecutive gold medals at the European Athletics Championships in 1946 and 1950, becoming Iceland's first European champion in athletics. This placed him among the country's first top international sportsmen, following its independence in 1944. He remains the only Icelandic athlete to win two European athletics titles.

He won eighteen Icelandic national titles in total: ten in shot put, six in discus throw and two in hammer throw. His personal best marks of 16.74 m (54 ft 11 in) for the shot put and 50.13 m (164 ft 5 1/2 in) for the discus were Icelandic records.

Despite his national success, he also caused controversy in Iceland due to his alcoholism and a physical assault, for which he served a jail sentence. As a result, he was banned from competition for a period by the national governing body.

== Career ==
=== Early life ===
Born in Reykjavík, he competed in various athletics events as a youth. Gradually he began to focus on throwing events as he grew older. He reached the top levels of shot putting in 1944, throwing a mark of 15.50 m (50 ft 10 in), which ranked him fourth in the world that season (in the inter-war period).

=== European gold medals ===
Huseby's first international medal came at the 1946 European Athletics Championships – the first after the end of World War II. Having already set an Icelandic record of 15.69 m (51 ft 5 1/2 in) and with international athletic competition regaining momentum, he took the gold medal with a throw of 15.56 m (51 ft 1/2 in), beating Soviet athlete Dmitriy Goryainov by a comfortable margin. This made him Iceland's first ever European champion in athletics. His win at the championships was significant for the country as it was Iceland's first top level international sporting success since its independence in 1944. He also competed in the discus, finishing 14th in qualifying with 41.74 m (136 ft 11 1/4 in).

He missed the 1948 season, meaning he did not compete London Olympics, but returned in strong form in 1949. That year he set a new Icelandic and Nordic record of 16.41 m (53 ft 10 in) in Haugesund, bettering the previous mark by Roland Nilsson of Sweden. He also set a new Nordic record for the two-handed shot put at the same competition; he achieved a distance of 11.88 m (38 ft 11 1/2 in) throwing with his left arm, meaning a record total of 28.29 m (92 ft 9 3/4 in).

He returned to defend his shot put title at the 1950 European Athletics Championships and was easily the best in the field, setting a championship record of 16.29 m (53 ft 5 1/4 in) to top qualifying before going further in the final with a national record and lifetime best of 16.74 m (54 ft 11 in). Huseby was a large distance ahead of runner-up Angiolo Profeti, who managed a little over fifteen metres.

Torfi Bryngeirsson won the men's long jump at the same tournament, making this Iceland's best ever European performance in the sport. Huseby's shot put title defence made him the most successful international Icelandic ever – no other athlete from the nation has won a European title since. He also managed to place eleventh in the discus qualifying. Huseby set a lifetime best for the discus that year, throwing the implement 50.13 m (164 ft 5 1/2 in) to rank within the world's top twenty for that event.

He remained in good form in 1951, having season's best of 16.69 m (54 ft 9 in) and 49.35 m (161 ft 10 3/4 in) for the shot put and discus, respectively. He was invited to the AAA Championships in England and was victorious at the 1951 AAA Championships, with a throw of 15.87 m (52 ft 3/4 in) – the furthest distance ever thrown at the competition at that point.

=== Later career ===
He developed alcoholism during this period and his approach to training and competition earned him a warning from Frjálsíþróttasamband Íslands (the national body for athletics) and an order that further bad conduct would warrant an international ban. In 1952 he confessed to assault and robbery of a man in Reykjavík and was sentenced to twelve months in prison. This meant he missed his second opportunity to compete at the Olympics, which was held in Helsinki that year.

Upon his release, he set an Icelandic indoor record, but the governing body had disagreements with him returning to the national championships – a fact which attracted criticism in the press, given Huseby's standing as one of the nation's top sportsmen. Eventually he was given his competition license and went on to represent Iceland at the 1958 European Athletics Championships. His form was not sufficient to win a third straight title, however, and his best toss of 15.62 m (51 ft 2 3/4 in) in the final placed the 35-year-old in 17th overall.

Huseby took his final Icelandic national title in 1962. This brought him to career totals of ten shot put titles, six discus throw titles and two hammer throw titles at the national championships. He reconciled with the governors of Frjálsíþróttasamband Íslands and an honorary retirement meeting was held in recognition of Huseby's 25-year athletics career.

== See also ==
- List of European Athletics Championships medalists (men)
