= Þorsteinn Löve =

Icelandic discus thrower (1923–2002)

Personal information
- Full name: Jóhann Þorsteinn Löve
- Nationality: Icelandic
- Born: 29 July 1923 Hvammur, Iceland
- Died: 10 April 2002 (aged 78) Malmö, Sweden

Sport
- Sport: Athletics
- Event: Discus throw

Þorsteinn Löve (29 July 1923 – 10 April 2002) was an Icelandic athlete. He competed in the men's discus throw at the 1952 Summer Olympics.
