= Angiolo Profeti =

Italian shot putter and discus thrower

Personal information
- Nationality: Italian
- Born: 23 May 1918 Castelfiorentino, Italy
- Died: 28 April 1981 (aged 62) Ferrara, Italy
- Height: 1.88 m (6 ft 2 in)
- Weight: 108 kg (238 lb)

Sport
- Country: Italy
- Sport: Athletics
- Events: Shot put Discus throw
- Club: Giglio Rosso Firenze
- Retired: 1954

Achievements and titles
- Personal best: Shot put: 15.42 m (1952)
Medal record
Men's athletics
Representing Italy
European Championships
| Silver medal – second place | 1950 Brussels | Shot put |
Mediterranean Games
| Gold medal – first place | 1949 Istanbul | Shot put |
| Gold medal – first place | 1949 Istanbul | Discus throw |
| Silver medal – second place | 1951 Alexandria | Shot put |

Angiolo Profeti (23 May 1918 – 28 April 1981), was an Italian shot putter and discus thrower who competed at the 1952 Summer Olympics.

== Biography ==
Profeti collected 26 caps for the Italy national athletics team. In his career, he won 15 national championships in the discus throw, and its record for speciality ex aequo with Adolfo Consolini.

Profeti won the British AAA Championships title in the shot put event at the 1938 AAA Championships.

Shortly afterwards in September, he competed at the 1938 European Athletics Championships, finishing 7th in the men's shot put competition.

== Achievements ==
| Year | Competition | Venue | Position | Event | Performance | Notes |
|---|---|---|---|---|---|---|
| 1950 | European Championships | Brussels, Belgium | 2nd | Shot put | 15.16 m | |
| 1951 | Mediterranean Games | Alexandria, Egypt | 2nd | Shot put | 15.02 m | |
| 1952 | Olympic Games | Helsinki, Finland | 12th | Shot put | 14.74 m | |

== National titles ==
- 15 wins in shot put at the Italian Athletics Championships (1938, 1939, 1940, 1941, 1942, 1945, 1946, 1947, 1948, 1949, 1950, 1951, 1952, 1953, 1954)
- 1 win in discus throw at the Italian Athletics Championships (1950)
