= Félix Erauzquin =

Spanish discus thrower

Personal information
- Nationality: Spanish
- Born: 20 November 1907 Zeanuri, Spain
- Died: 7 May 1987 (aged 79)

Sport
- Sport: Athletics
- Event: Discus throw

Félix Erauzquin (20 November 1907 – 7 May 1987) was a Spanish athlete. He competed in the men's discus throw at the 1948 Summer Olympics.
