= Uno Fransson =

Swedish discus thrower

Personal information
- Nationality: Swedish
- Born: 18 August 1927 Bengtsfors Municipality, Sweden
- Died: 4 August 1995 (aged 67)

Sport
- Sport: Discus throw

Uno Fransson (18 August 1927 – 4 August 1995) was a Swedish discus thrower. He was born in Gustavsfors, Bengtsfors Municipality.

He competed at the 1948 Summer Olympics in London, where he placed 10th in the final.
