= Günther Kruse =

Argentine discus thrower

Personal information
- Nationality: Argentine
- Born: 5 July 1934
- Died: 18 January 2007 (aged 72)
- Height: 184 cm (6 ft 0 in)
- Weight: 80 kg (176 lb)

Sport
- Sport: Athletics
- Events: Discus throw, Shot put
Medal record
Men's Athletics
Representing Argentina
Ibero-American Games
Gold medal – first place	1960 Santiago	Discus throw
South American Championships
Gold medal – first place	1961 Lima	Discus throw
Silver medal – second place	1958 Montevideo	Discus throw
Bronze medal – third place	1957 Santiago	Shot put
Bronze medal – third place	1956 Santiago	Shot put

Günther Kruse (5 July 1934 – 18 January 2007) was an Argentine athlete. He competed in the men's discus throw at the 1956 Summer Olympics.

== International competitions ==
Year	Competition	Venue	Position	Event	Notes
Representing Argentina
1956	South American Championships	Santiago, Chile	3rd	Shot put	13.97 m
1956	South American Championships	Santiago, Chile	1st	Discus throw	48.57 m
1956	Olympic Games	Melbourne, Australia	11th	Discus throw	49.89 m
1957	South American Championships (unofficial)	Santiago, Chile	3rd	Shot put	14.38 m
1957	South American Championships (unofficial)	Santiago, Chile	1st	Discus throw	48.25 m
1958	South American Championships	Montevideo, Uruguay	5th	Shot put	14.45 m
1958	South American Championships	Montevideo, Uruguay	2nd	Discus throw	47.43 m
1960	Ibero-American Games	Santiago, Chile	1st	Discus throw	48.56 m
1961	South American Championships	Lima, Peru	1st	Discus throw	48.57 m

== Personal bests ==
- Shot put – 15.01 metres (Buenos Aires 1957)
- Discus throw – 52.84 metres (Buenos Aires 1956) former NR
