= Uri Gallin =

Israeli discus thrower (1928–2021)

Uri "Urion" Gallin
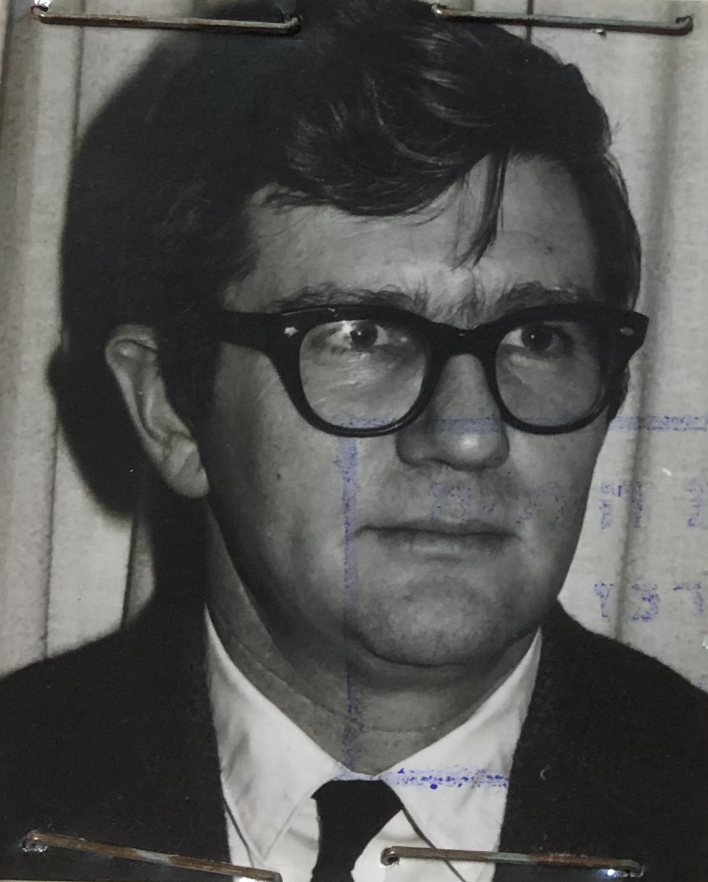
- Portrait of Uri Gallin

Personal information
- Native name: אורי גלין
- National team: Israel
- Born: June 29, 1928
- Died: April 5, 2021 (aged 92)

Sport
- Sport: Discus

Achievements and titles
- Personal best: 48.02 metres (1956)

Uri Galin (also "Urion" Galin-Galler; Hebrew: אורי גלין; June 29, 1928 – 4 April 2021) was an Israeli Olympic discus thrower.

== Discus throw career ==
Gallin's personal best in the discus throw is 48.03, in 1956. He competed for Israel at the 1952 Summer Olympics in Helsinki at the age of 24. He participated in the men's discus throw, coming in 32nd with a best distance of 40.76.
