= Boris Butenko =

Soviet discus thrower

Personal information
- Nationality: Soviet
- Born: 9 May 1923 Yekaterinoslav, Ukrainian SSR
- Died: 26 November 1999 (aged 76)

Sport
- Sport: Athletics
- Event: Discus throw

Boris Butenko (9 May 1923 – 26 November 1999) was a Ukrainian and Soviet athlete. He competed in the men's discus throw at the 1952 Summer Olympics.
