= Jean Maissant =

French discus thrower (1926–2020)

Personal information
- Nationality: French
- Born: 23 January 1926
- Died: 7 November 2020 (aged 94)

Sport
- Sport: Athletics
- Event: Discus throw

Jean Maissant (23 January 1926 – 7 November 2020) was a French athlete. He competed in the men's discus throw at the 1952 Summer Olympics.
