= Oto Grigalka =

Latvian shot putter and discus thrower

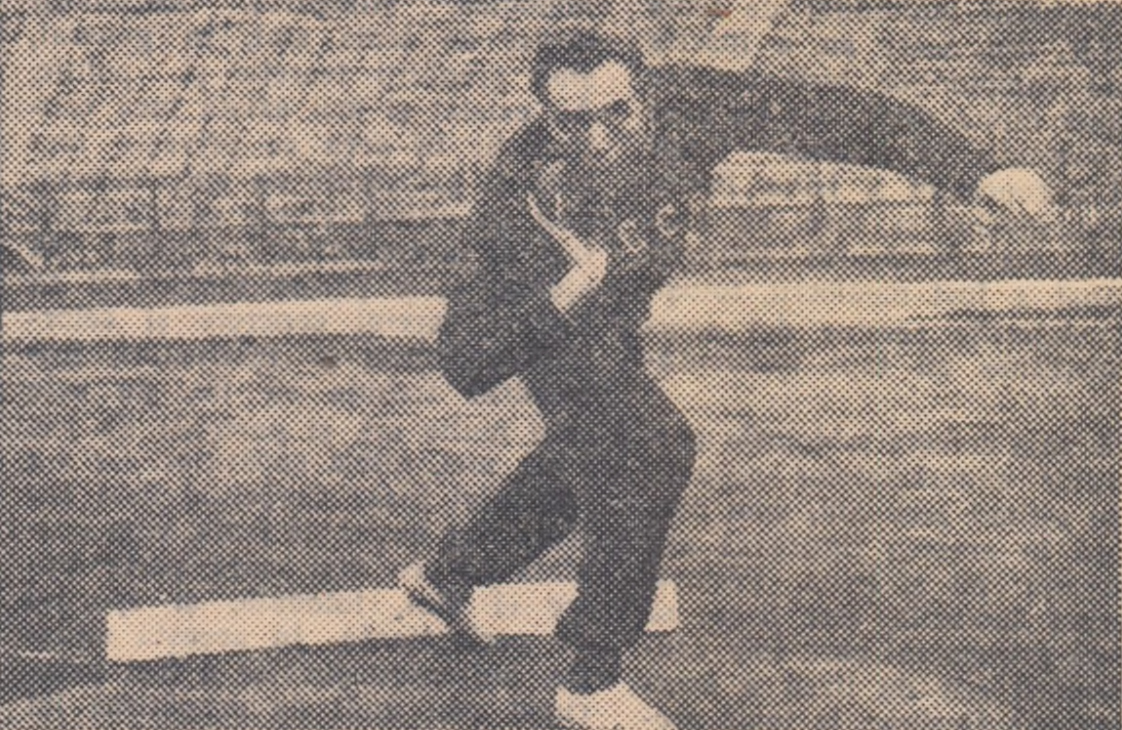

Medal record

Men's athletics

Representing the Soviet Union

European Championships
Bronze medal – third place	1950 Brussels	Shot put
Silver medal – second place	1954 Bern	Shot put

Oto Yanovich Grigalka (Russian: Отто Янович Григалка; 28 June 1925 – 8 February 1993) was a Latvian track and field athlete who competed in the shot put and discus throw. He represented the Soviet Union at the Summer Olympics in 1952 and 1956. He placed fourth in the shot put and sixth in the discus in 1952, then came fifth at the 1956 Olympic discus competition.

Grigalka was twice a medallist for the Soviet Union at the European Athletics Championships, taking shot put bronze in 1950, then the shot put silver in 1954. He also competed in the discus at the latter edition, placing sixth. He was highly successful as a student-athlete at the World Festival of Youth and Students, taking three consecutive shot put silver medals before winning the gold medal in 1955.

At national level he was a seven-time winner at the Soviet Athletics Championships, taking three straight shot put titles from 1952 to 1954 and going undefeated in the discus throw from 1953 to 1956. During his career he was a member of the Dynamo Moscow sports club and was trained by Leonīds Mitropoļskis. He later went into coaching and was throws coach to the 1964 Olympic Soviet team.

His personal bests were 17.20 m (56 ft 5 in) for the shot put (achieved during his 1954 European silver medal performance) and 56.94 m (186 ft 9 1/2 in), achieved in Kharkov in 1958. He was highly ranked in the discus throw during the latter part of his career, placing third on the world seasonal lists for the event in 1955 and 1958. His best yearly placing in the shot put was fifth, which he achieved in both 1951 and 1954.

He was born and died in Saikava, a small village in Latvia's Madona Municipality. He married a fellow Soviet track athlete, Mariya Pisareva who won an Olympic high jump medal.

== International competitions ==
Year	Competition	Venue	Position	Event	Notes
1949	World Festival of Youth and Students	Budapest, Hungary	2nd	Shot put	14.76 m
1950	European Championships	Brussels, Belgium	3rd	Shot put	15.14 m
1951	World Festival of Youth and Students	East Berlin, East Germany	2nd	Shot put	15.59 m
1952	Olympic Games	Helsinki, Finland	4th	Shot put	16.78 m
1952	Olympic Games	Helsinki, Finland	6th	Discus throw	50.71 m
1953	World Festival of Youth and Students	Bucharest, Romania	2nd	Shot put	16.23 m
1954	European Championships	Bern, Switzerland	2nd	Shot put	16.69 m
1954	European Championships	Bern, Switzerland	6th	Discus throw	50.60 m
1955	World Festival of Youth and Students	Warsaw, Poland	1st	Shot put	17.05 m
1956	Olympic Games	Melbourne, Australia	5th	Discus throw	52.37 m

== National titles ==
- Soviet Athletics Championships
  - Shot put: 1952, 1953, 1954
  - Discus throw: 1953, 1954, 1955, 1956

== See also ==
- List of European Athletics Championships medalists (men)
