= Bill Burton (athlete) =

American discus thrower

Personal information
- Full name: William Edward Burton
- Nationality: American
- Born: March 29, 1915
- Died: May 13, 1984 (aged 69)

Sport
- Sport: Athletics
- Event: Discus throw

William Edward Burton (March 29, 1915 – May 13, 1984) was an American athlete. He competed in the men's discus throw at the 1948 Summer Olympics.
