= Tadeusz Krzyżanowski =

Polish shot putter (1920–1987)

Personal information
- Nationality: Polish
- Born: 29 August 1920 Osterfeld, Germany
- Died: 31 January 1987 (aged 66) Gdańsk, Poland
- Height: 1.78 m (5 ft 10 in)
- Weight: 84 kg (185 lb)

Sport
- Event: Shot put
- Club: Spójnia Gdańsk

Tadeusz Krzyżanowski (29 August 1920, in Osterfeld – 31 January 1987, in Gdańsk) was a Polish shot putter who competed in the 1952 Summer Olympics.

== International competitions ==
| Year | Competition | Venue | Position | Event | Notes |
Representing Poland
| 1952 | Olympic Games | Helsinki, Finland | 10th | Shot put | 15.08 m |

== Personal bests ==
- Shot put – 15.72 (Warsaw 1952)
- Discus throw – 45.81 (Grudziądz 1954)
