= Georgy Fyodorov =

Soviet shot putter

Personal information
- Nationality: Soviet
- Born: 26 June 1923

Sport
- Sport: Athletics
- Event: Shot put

Georgy Fyodorov (born 26 June 1923) was a Soviet athlete. He competed in the men's shot put at the 1952 Summer Olympics.
