= Arne Hellberg =

Swedish athletics competitor

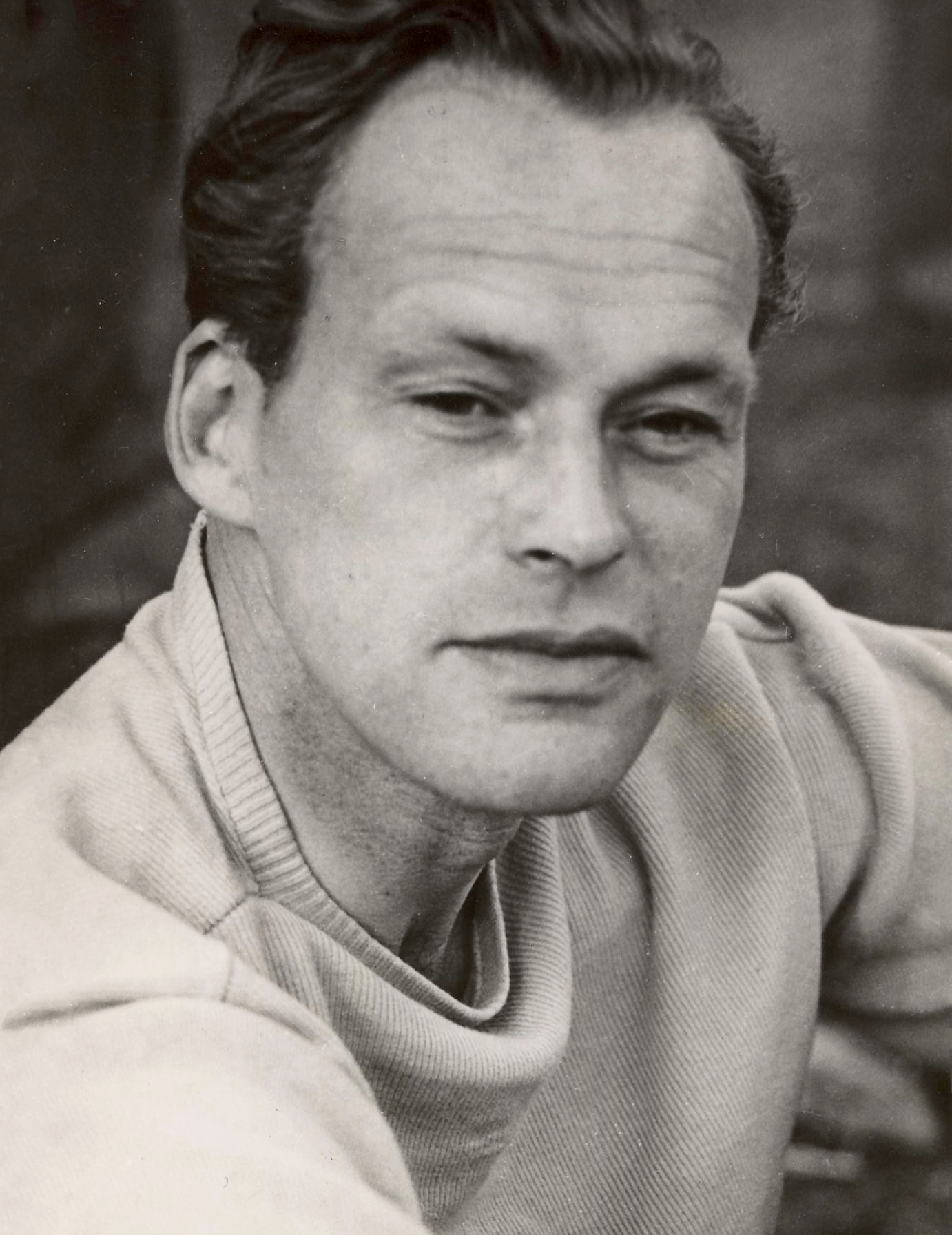

Personal information
- Born: 13 March 1920
- Died: 1977 (aged approximately 57)

Sport
- Sport: Athletics
- Event(s): Discus throw, shot put
- Club: Solna IF

Achievements and titles
- Personal best(s): DT – 48.67 m (1950); SP – 14.87 m

Arne Hellberg (13 March 1920 – 1977) was a Swedish discus thrower. He won the national title in 1945 and placed fifth at the 1950 European Championships.
