= Darrow Hooper =

American athlete (1932–2018)

Personal information
- Full name: Clarence Darrow Hooper
- Born: January 30, 1932 Fort Worth, Texas, U.S.
- Died: August 19, 2018 (aged 86)
Medal record
Men's athletics
Representing United States
Olympic Games
Silver medal – second place	1952 Helsinki	Shot put

Clarence Darrow Hooper (January 30, 1932 – August 19, 2018) was an American athlete who competed mainly in the shot put.

Hooper was born in Fort Worth, Texas, where in 1949 he graduated from North Side High School. He went on to attend Texas A&M University and won the NCAA shot put title in 1951. By the time he graduated from college, he had a wife and two children. He competed for the United States in the 1952 Summer Olympics held in Helsinki, Finland in the shot put. Hooper's last throw was just two centimeters away from winning the gold medal: Parry O’Brien's shot put measured 17.41 (57' 1 1/2"), while Hooper's measured 17.39m (57' 3/4") Hooper won the silver medal.

In the Olympic trials, Hooper had beaten O'Brien with an almost mirror image of the Olympics, 17.41m listed as (57' 1 3/8") while O'Brien shot putted 17.38 (57' 1/2"). It was O'Brien's last defeat before an unprecedented 116 straight victories over the next 3 years, 364 days. Both athletes left Jim Fuchs, the World Record holder at the time, relegated to third place with a 17.36m. That ended Fuchs' string of 88 consecutive victories that dated back to 1949. He was inducted into the Texas Track and Field Coaches Hall of Fame, Class of 2016.

He was drafted by the New York Giants in the tenth round of the 1953 NFL draft, but chose not to play and focused on working as a civil engineer.
