= Olli Partanen =

Finnish discus thrower (1922–2014)

Medal record

Men's athletics

Representing Finland

European Championships
Bronze medal – third place	1950 Brussels	Discus throw

Heikki Olavi ("Olli") Partanen (18 August 1922 – 15 June 2014), born in Kouvola, was a Finnish discus thrower. Partanen won EM-bronze in the discus throw at the Brussels 1950 European Championships with the result 48,69. Partanen performed his record 50,14 on 25 September 1949 at Karhula. He represented Kouvolan Urheilijat (Finnish. The Sportsmen of Kouvola) in the club level. During the Second World War he served Nazi Germany in the Finnish Volunteer Battalion of the Waffen-SS.
