= Kaarto Rask =

Finnish shot putter

Kaarto Rask (7 October 1928 – 17 March 2001) was a Finnish shot putter who competed in the 1952 Summer Olympics.
