= Alois Schwabl =

Austrian athlete

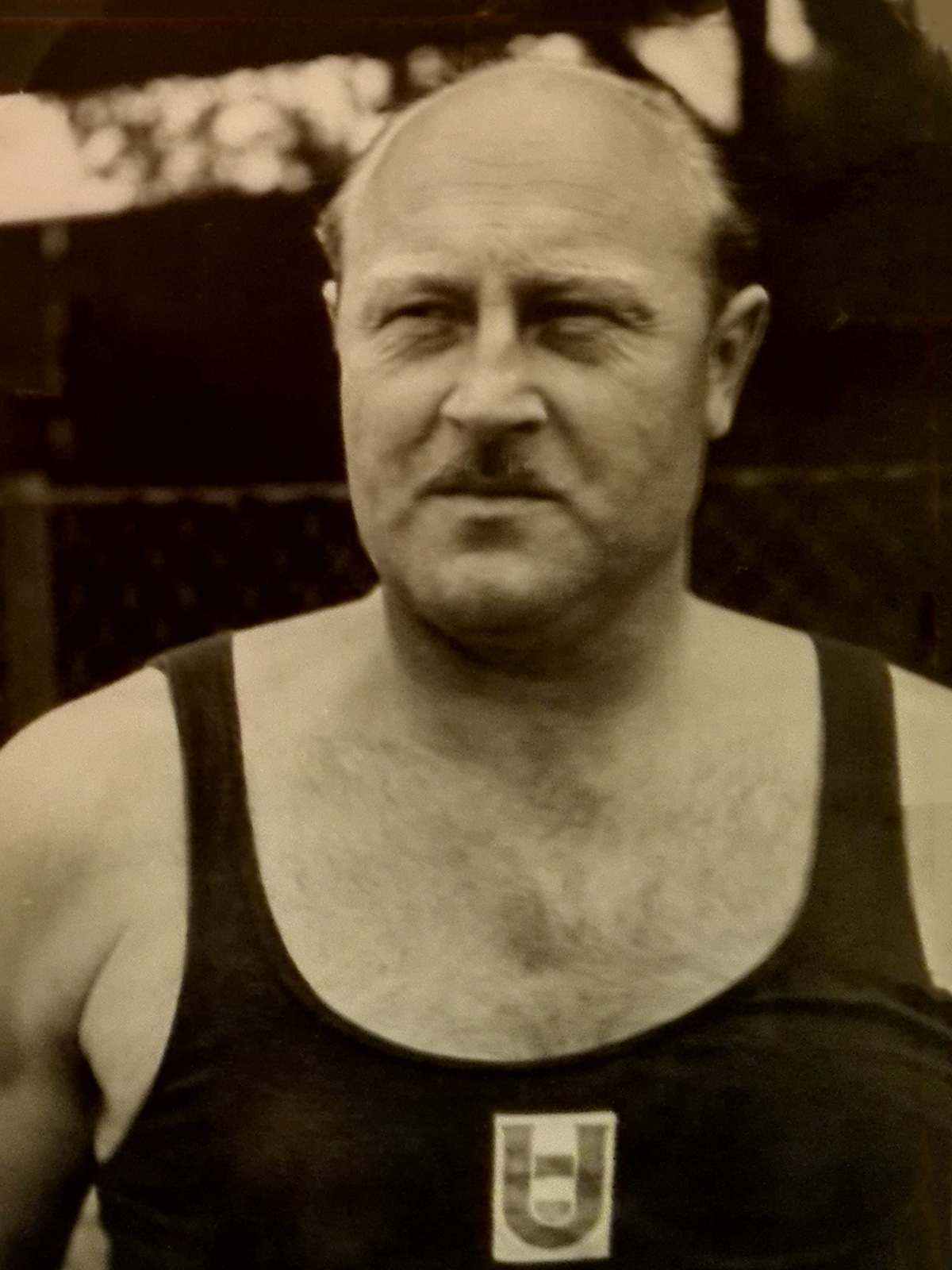
- Alois Schwabl in 1955

Personal information
- Nationality: Austrian
- Born: 4 March 1912
- Died: 7 December 1977 (aged 65)

Sport
- Sport: Athletics
- Event: Shot put

Alois Schwabl (4 March 1912 – 7 December 1977) was an Austrian athlete. He competed in the men's shot put at the 1952 Summer Olympics.
