= Jón Ólafsson (athlete) =

Icelandic high jumper

Personal information
- Nationality: Icelandic
- Born: 21 June 1941
- Died: 25 January 2026 (aged 84)

Sport
- Sport: Athletics
- Event: High jump

Jón Ólafsson (21 June 1941 – 25 January 2026) was an Icelandic athlete. He competed in the men's high jump at the 1964 Summer Olympics and the 1968 Summer Olympics.
