= Raymond Tissot =

French javelin thrower

Personal information
- Nationality: French
- Born: 2 August 1919 Oyonnax, France
- Died: 19 February 1985 (aged 65) Lyon, France

Sport
- Sport: Athletics
- Event: Javelin throw

Raymond Tissot (French: [ʁɛmɔ̃ tiso]; 2 August 1919 – 19 February 1985) was a French athlete. He competed in the men's javelin throw at the 1948 Summer Olympics.
