= Des Koch =

American athletics competitor

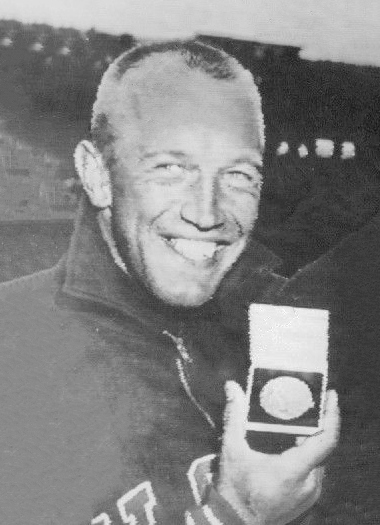
- Koch at the 1956 Olympics

Personal information
- Born: May 10, 1932 Lincoln County, Tennessee, U.S.
- Died: January 26, 1991 (aged 58) Los Angeles, California, U.S.
- Education: USC
- Height: 183 cm (6 ft 0 in)
- Weight: 95 kg (209 lb)

Sport
- Sport: Athletics
- Events: Discus throw, shot put, javelin throw
- Club: US Air Force

Achievements and titles
- Personal bests: DT – 55.08 m (1956); SP – 15.85 m (1954); JT – 64.92 m (1954)
Medal record
Representing United States
Olympic Games
Bronze medal – third place	1956 Melbourne	Discus throw

Desmond Dalworth Koch (May 10, 1932 – January 26, 1991) was an American track and field athlete and football player who won a bronze medal in the discus throw at the 1956 Summer Olympics.

Koch graduated from Reed High School in Shelton, Washington and University of Southern California. In 1955 he won the NCAA discus title, but failed to qualify for the 1956 Olympics; he was included in the team to replace Ron Drummond who could not compete. Besides athletics Koch was known for his football skills. He played as an amateur and tried out with the Green Bay Packers (who drafted him in the 16th round of the 1954 NFL draft) and San Diego Chargers, but never played as a professional. Koch married Mitzi Whitefeather, a Native American. They together had three children name India, Tonya, and Sandy. After retiring from sport he worked at a plastics manufacturing plant, eventually becoming its executive.
