= James Dillion =

American discus thrower

Personal information
- Born: May 2, 1929 Plain City, Ohio, U.S.
- Died: September 16, 2010 (aged 81) Arlington, Texas, U.S.
- Education: Auburn University
- Height: 188 cm (6 ft 2 in)
- Weight: 99 kg (218 lb)

Sport
- Sport: Athletics
- Events: Discus throw, shot put
- Club: Auburn Tigers

Achievements and titles
- Personal bests: DT – 55.07 m (1954); SP – 16.11 m (1952)
Medal record
Representing United States
Olympic Games
Bronze medal – third place	1952 Helsinki	Discus throw

James Leo Dillion (May 2, 1929 – September 16, 2010) was an American discus thrower who won a bronze medal at the 1952 Summer Olympics. Domestically he won the NCAA title in 1952 and the AAU title in 1952.

After retiring from competitions Dillion became an airplane mechanic and private pilot. In his free time he restored planes and cars together with his son Jimmy.
