= Boris Matveyev =

Russian footballer

Boris Matveyev Борис Матвеев
Personal information
- Full name: Boris Mikhailovich Matveyev
- Date of birth: 19 February 1970 (age 56)
- Place of birth: Leningrad, Russian SFSR
- Height: 1.72 m (5 ft 8 in)
- Positions: Midfielder; forward

Senior career*
Years	Team	Apps	(Gls)
1987–1991	FC Zenit St. Petersburg	89	(6)
1992	FC Smena-Saturn St. Petersburg	35	(5)
1993	FC St. Pauli	0	(0)
1993–1995	FC Smena-Saturn St. Petersburg	56	(5)
1996	FC Zenit St. Petersburg	9	(0)
1996	Maccabi Tel Aviv F.C.	7	(0)
1997	Hapoel Beit She'an F.C.	10	(0)
1998	FC Lokomotiv Nizhny Novgorod	13	(1)
1998	FC Irtysh Omsk	0	(0)
1999	FC Torpedo-ZIL Moscow	2	(0)
1999	FC Access-Esil	12	(1)
2000	FC Dynamo-Stroyimpuls St. Petersburg		
2001–2002	FC Kondopoga		
- * Club domestic league appearances and goals

Boris Mikhailovich Matveyev (Russian: Борис Михайлович Матвеев; born 19 February 1970) is a former Russian professional footballer.

== Club career ==
He made his professional debut in the Soviet Top League in 1987 for FC Zenit Leningrad. He played 1 game in the UEFA Cup 1989–90 for FC Zenit Leningrad.
