= Jørgen Munk Plum =

Danish discus thrower (1925–2011)

Personal information
- Nationality: Danish
- Born: 16 July 1925
- Died: 11 April 2011 (aged 85)

Sport
- Sport: Athletics
- Event: Discus throw

Jørgen Munk Plum (16 July 1925 – 11 April 2011) was a Danish athlete. He competed in the men's discus throw at the 1952 Summer Olympics.
