= Erik Westlin =

Swedish discus thrower

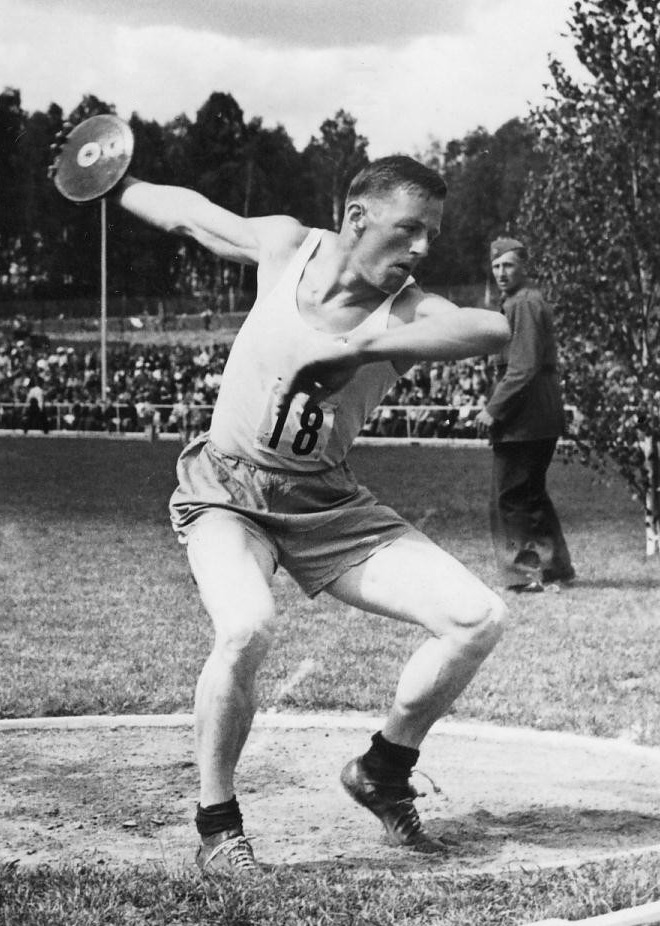

Personal information
- Born: 23 February 1913
- Died: 8 April 1977 (aged 64)

Sport
- Sport: Athletics
- Event: Discus throw
- Club: IFK Norrköping

Achievements and titles
- Personal best: 49.03 m (1947)

Erik Westlin (23 February 1913 – 8 April 1977) was a Swedish discus thrower. He won the national title in 1942 and 1946 and placed sixth at the 1946 European Championships.
