= Veikko Nyqvist =

Finnish discus thrower

Personal information
- Nationality: Finnish
- Born: 9 August 1916 Helsinki, Finland
- Died: 10 August 1968 (aged 52)

Sport
- Country: Finland
- Sport: Discus throw
Medal record
Men's athletics
Representing Finland
European Championships
Bronze medal – third place	1946 Oslo	Discus throw

Veikko Nyqvist (9 August 1916 – 10 August 1968) was a Finnish discus thrower. He was born in Helsinki.

He competed at the 1948 Summer Olympics in London, where he placed 6th in the final. He also competed at the 1952 Summer Olympics in Helsinki.
