= Roy Pella =

Canadian discus thrower (1930–1993)

Personal information
- Full name: Gino Roy Pella
- Nationality: Canadian
- Born: 11 May 1930 Azzano Decimo, Italy
- Died: 1 February 1993 (aged 62) Guelph, Ontario, Canada

Sport
- Sport: Athletics
- Event: Discus throw

Gino Roy Pella (11 May 1930 – 1 February 1993) was a Canadian athlete. He competed in the men's discus throw at the 1952 Summer Olympics.

Pella competed for the University of Michigan from 1952 to 1954, winning the Big Ten Conference discus championship in 1954. He was named to the Michigan Wolverines Hall of Fame in September 2015.

Pella died in Guelph, Ontario, on 1 February 1993, at the age of 62.
