= Arvo Huutoniemi =

Finnish discus thrower

Personal information
- Nationality: Finnish
- Born: 24 October 1913 Lehtimäki, Finland
- Died: 21 May 1996 (aged 82)

Sport
- Country: Finland
- Sport: Discus throw

Arvo Huutoniemi (24 October 1913 – 21 May 1996) was a Finnish discus thrower. He was born in Lehtimäki.

He competed at the 1948 Summer Olympics in London, where he placed 9th in the final. He also competed at the 1952 Summer Olympics in Helsinki.
