= Heino Heinaste =

Estonian athletics competitor

Personal information
- Born: 3 March 1928 Tallinn
- Died: 25 June 2006 (aged 78)
- Occupation(s): discus thrower and shot putter
Medal record
Men's athletics
Representing Soviet Union
European Championships
Bronze medal – third place	1954 Bern	Shot put

Heino Heinaste (also Heinoste; until 1936 Hermann; 3 March 1928 – 25 June 2006) was an Estonian discus thrower and shot putter.

He was born in Tallinn.

He began athletics training in 1949, focusing on shot put and discus throw. He won bronze medal at 1954 European Athletics Championships – Men's shot put. He was multiple-time Estonian champion in shot put and discus throw. He was 5 times a member of Soviet Union, and 31 times Estonian national athletics team.

Personal best:

- shot put: 17.27 (1960)
- discus throw: 53.30 (1961)
