= Fanie du Plessis =

South African discus thrower and shot putter

Personal information
- Nationality: South African
- Born: 23 February 1930 Lichtenburg, South Africa
- Died: 30 July 2001 (aged 71) Pretoria, Gauteng, South Africa
- Height: 190 cm (6 ft 3 in)
- Weight: 109 kg (240 lb)

Sport
- Sport: Athletics
- Event: discus throw
Medal record
Representing South Africa
Commonwealth Games
Gold medal – first place	1954 Vancouver	Discus Throw
Gold medal – first place	1958 Cardiff	Discus Throw
Bronze medal – third place	1954 Vancouver	Shot Put

Stephanus Johannes du Plessis (23 February 1930 – 13 August 2001) was a discus thrower and shot putter, who represented South Africa at two Summer Olympics in 1956 and 1960. He was twice gold medalist at the Commonwealth Games (in 1954 and 1958, then known as the British Empire and Commonwealth Games) in the men's discus throw event.

== Biography ==
Du Plessis was born on 23 February 1930 in Lichtenburg, South Africa. As an athlete he specialised in the throwing events and had international success in two disciplines, the discus and the shot put. Before South Africa was banned from the Olympics and the Commonwealth Games, Plessis represented his country in both arena. He did not achieve podium finishes in the Olympics and it is said that when once asked by his manager why he hadn't done as well as his best he replied "I was bewitched".

In the final two Commonwealth Games that South Africa competed in before their ban, Fanie du Plessis dominated the men's discus-throw. In 1954 so dominant was he that he surpassed the Games' record with every one of his throws until he finally won with a distance of 51,70m At the 1954 Games he also won bronze in the Shot Put. In 1958 he again won gold in the discus. His best throw was 56.32m in 1959.

In addition to his Games successes, du Plessis won the British AAA Championships title at the 1958 AAA Championships.

He died in Pretoria, Gauteng, aged 71.
