= 1953 Summer International University Sports Week =

Multi-sport event in Dortmund, Germany

- Host city: Dortmund, West Germany
- Nations: 21
- Athletes: <800
- Events: 7 sports
- Opening: August 9, 1953
- Closing: August 16, 1953
- Opened by: Walter Hallstein
- Main venue: Stadion Rote Erde

The 1953 Summer International University Sports Week were organised by the International University Sports Federation (FISU) and held in Dortmund, West Germany, between 7 and 14 August.

== Sports ==
- Athletics
- Basketball
- Fencing
- Football
- Swimming
- Tennis
- Water polo
