= Gösta Arvidsson =

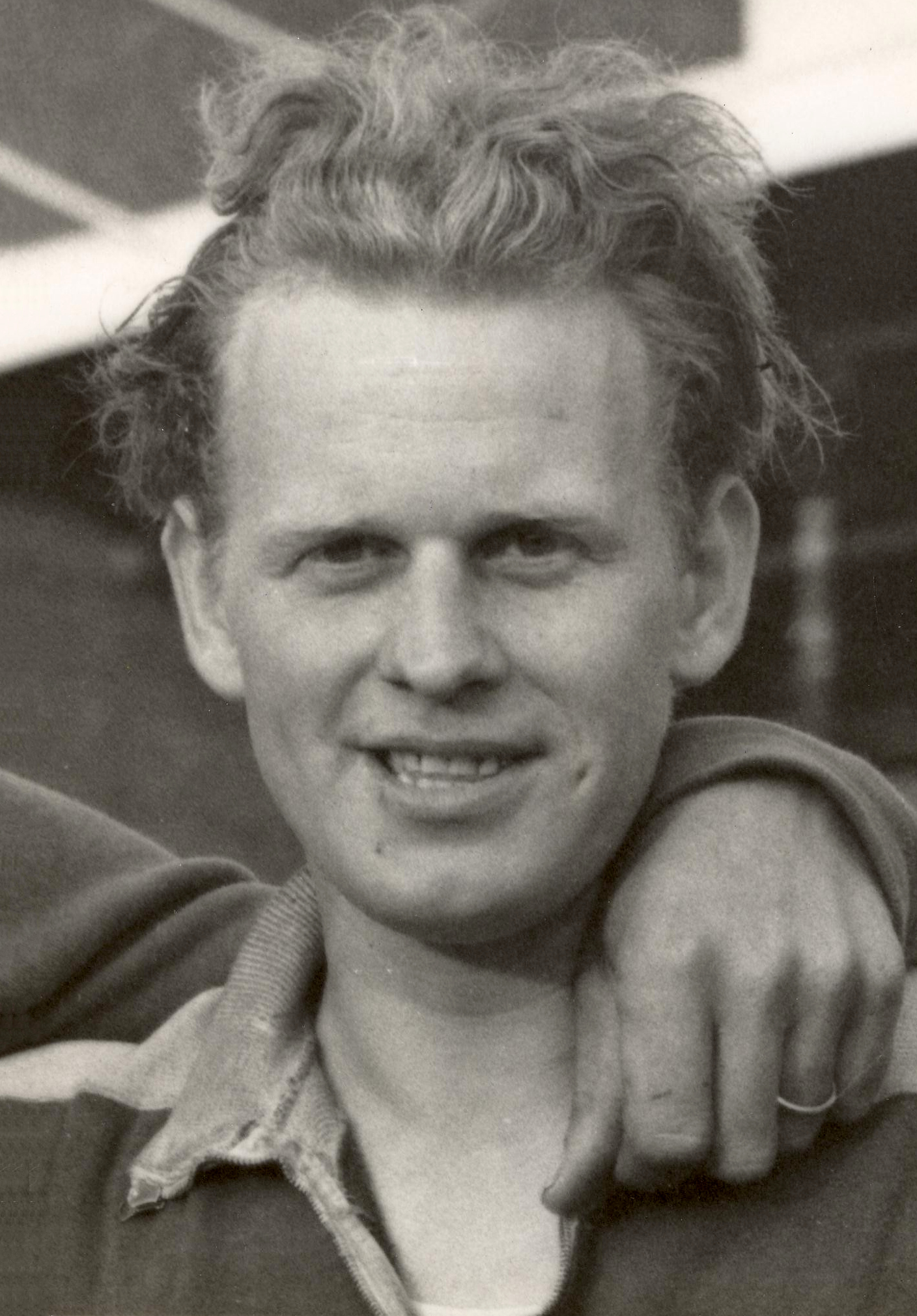

Personal information
- Nationality: Swedish
- Born: 21 August 1925 Falköping, Västra Götaland, Sweden
- Died: 16 February 2012 (aged 86) Skövde, Sweden
- Weight: 90 kg (200 lb)

Sport
- Sport: Athletics
- Event: Shot put
- Club: Falköpings AIK

Achievements and titles
- Personal best: 15.92 m (1948)

Gösta Arvidsson (21 August 1925 – 16 February 2012) was a Swedish shot putter who finished fifth at the 1948 Summer Olympics. He won the national title in 1950 and 1951, placing second in 1948.
