= Oskar Häfliger =

Swiss discus thrower

Personal information
- Nationality: Swiss
- Born: 9 August 1923
- Died: 28 October 1976 (aged 53) Bern, Switzerland

Sport
- Sport: Athletics
- Event: Discus throw

Oskar Häfliger (9 August 1923 – 28 October 1976) was a Swiss athlete. He competed in the men's discus throw at the 1952 Summer Olympics.
