= Raymond Kintziger =

Belgian discus thrower

Personal information
- Nationality: Belgian
- Born: 23 December 1922 Koblenz, Germany
- Died: 10 October 2010 (aged 87) Arlon, Luxembourg

Sport
- Sport: Athletics
- Event: discus
- Club: AAC, Antwerp

Raymond Pierre Kintziger (23 December 1922 – 10 October 2010) was a Belgian athlete who competed in the 1952 Summer Olympics.

Kintziger won the British AAA Championships title in the discus throw event at the 1950 AAA Championships.
