= Boris Matveyev (athlete) =

Soviet discus thrower

Personal information
- Nationality: Soviet
- Born: 10 December 1929 Kronstadt, Leningrad Oblast, Russian SFSR, Soviet Union
- Died: 30 March 1968 (aged 38) Leningrad, Soviet Union
- Resting place: Serafimovskoe Cemetery

Sport
- Sport: Athletics
- Event: Discus throw

Boris Mikhailovich Matveyev (Russian: Борис Михайлович Матвеев; 10 December 1929 – 30 March 1968) was a Soviet athlete. He competed in the men's discus throw at the 1952 Summer Olympics and the 1956 Summer Olympics.

Matveyev died on 30 March 1968 and was buried in Leningrad's Serafimovskoe Cemetery.
