= Willy Senn =

Swiss shot putter (1920–1989)

Personal information
- Nationality: Swiss
- Born: 25 February 1920
- Died: 27 October 1989

Sport
- Sport: Athletics
- Event: Shot put

Willy Senn (25 February 1920 – 27 October 1989) was a Swiss athlete. He competed in the men's shot put at the 1948 Summer Olympics. Senn is deceased.
