= Sim Iness =

American discus thrower

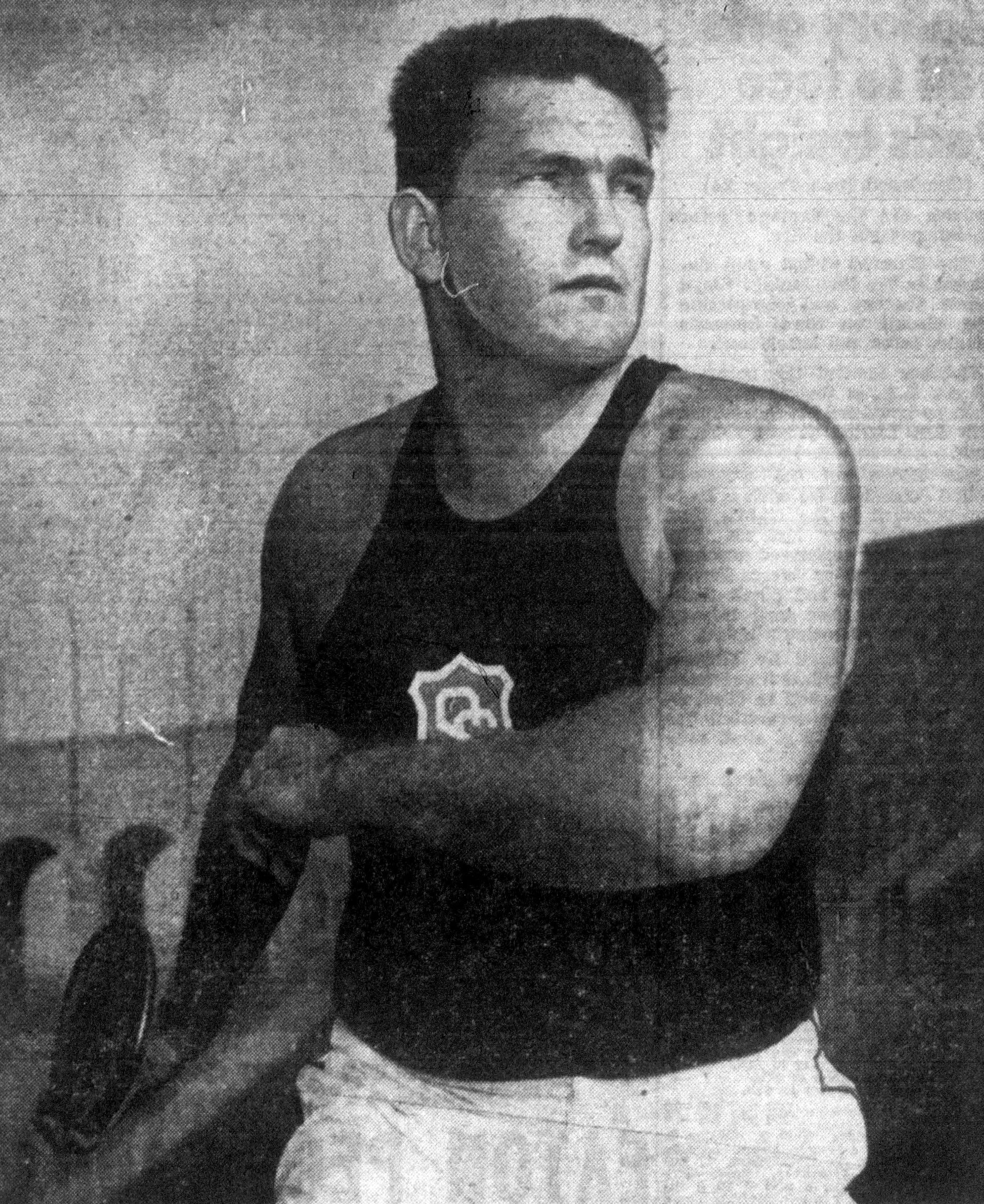
- Iness, circa 1950

Personal information
- Born: July 9, 1930 Keota, Oklahoma, U.S.
- Died: May 23, 1996 (aged 65) Porterville, California, U.S.
- Height: 198 cm (6 ft 6 in)
- Weight: 108 kg (238 lb)

Sport
- Sport: Athletics
- Event: Discus throw
- Club: LAAC, Los Angeles

Achievements and titles
- Personal best: 57.93 m (1953)
Medal record
Representing the United States
Olympic Games
Gold medal – first place	1952 Helsinki	Discus throw

Simeon "Sim" Garland Iness (July 9, 1930 – May 23, 1996) was an American discus thrower who won a gold medal at the 1952 Summer Olympics, breaking the Olympic record several times in the process. Next year he set a new world record at 57.93 m.

== Early life and education ==
As a child of sharecroppers, in 1934 his family left Oklahoma due to the onset of the dust bowl and moved to the small San Joaquin Valley town of Tulare, California. There he became lifelong friends with classmate and teammate at Tulare Union High School and Olympic teammate, decathlon champion Bob Mathias. Weeks after his high school graduation, and on his 18th birthday, Iness placed sixth in the discus in the 1948 Olympic Trials.

Iness first attended college at Compton Junior College, where he won the National Junior College discus championship in 1949. He was also a member of the winning Compton football squad along with future NFL Hall of Famer "Hurricane" Hugh McElhenny, which won the 1948 Junior Rose Bowl game, becoming National Junior College champions. He then transferred to the University of Southern California where he won the NCAA discus championship in 1952 and 1953. While at the University of Southern California, Iness was a member of Tau Kappa Epsilon.

== Career ==
Iness competed for the United States in the 1952 Summer Olympics held in Helsinki, Finland, here he won the gold medal with a throw of 55.03 m. His gold medal triumph started the longest USA winning streak in the discus event in modern Olympic history. He set the discus world's record on June 28, 1953 in Lincoln, Nebraska at 57.93 m, being the first man to throw over 190 feet. He went on to appear in two Hollywood films, Sign of the Pagan (1954) with Jack Palance and Jeff Chandler and Lady Godiva of Coventry (1955) with Maureen O'Hara. He was an Olympic torch bearer for the 1960 Squaw Valley Winter Olympics.

After his Olympic and world record triumph, Iness worked the rest of his life as a high school and college physical education teacher, track and football coach, and education counselor. "Sim Iness Gymnasium" can be found on the campus of Sim's alma-mater, Tulare Union High School. The Sim Iness Collection is housed at the Tulare City Historical Museum.
