= Raymond Thomas (athlete) =

French shot putter

Raymond Thomas (6 January 1931 – 1 May 2002) was a French shot putter, born in Paris, who competed in the 1956 Summer Olympics.
