= Cummin Clancy =

Irish Olympic athlete

Personal information
- Nationality: Irish/American
- Born: 9 November 1922
- Died: February 15, 2013 (aged 90) Garden City, Nassau County, New York
- Education: Glann National School; Villanova University
- Occupation: businessman
- Height: 187 cm (6 ft 2 in)
- Weight: 95 kg (209 lb)

Sport
- Sport: Athletics
- Event: discus throw
- Club: Donore Harriers, Dublin

Cummin Clancy (9 November 1922 – 15 February 2013) was an Irish athlete, who competed at the 1948 Summer Olympics.

== Biography ==
Clancy was educated at Glann National School and later graduated from Villanova University in the U.S. and became a successful businessman in New York City.

Clancy won the British AAA Championships title in the discus throw event at the 1948 AAA Championships. Shortly afterwards he represented the Ireland at the 1948 Olympic Games in London, where he participated in the men's discus throw competition finishing 22nd. Clancy

He died in 2013, aged 90, at his home in Garden City, Nassau County, New York.
