= Adolfo Consolini =

Italian discus thrower (1917–1969)

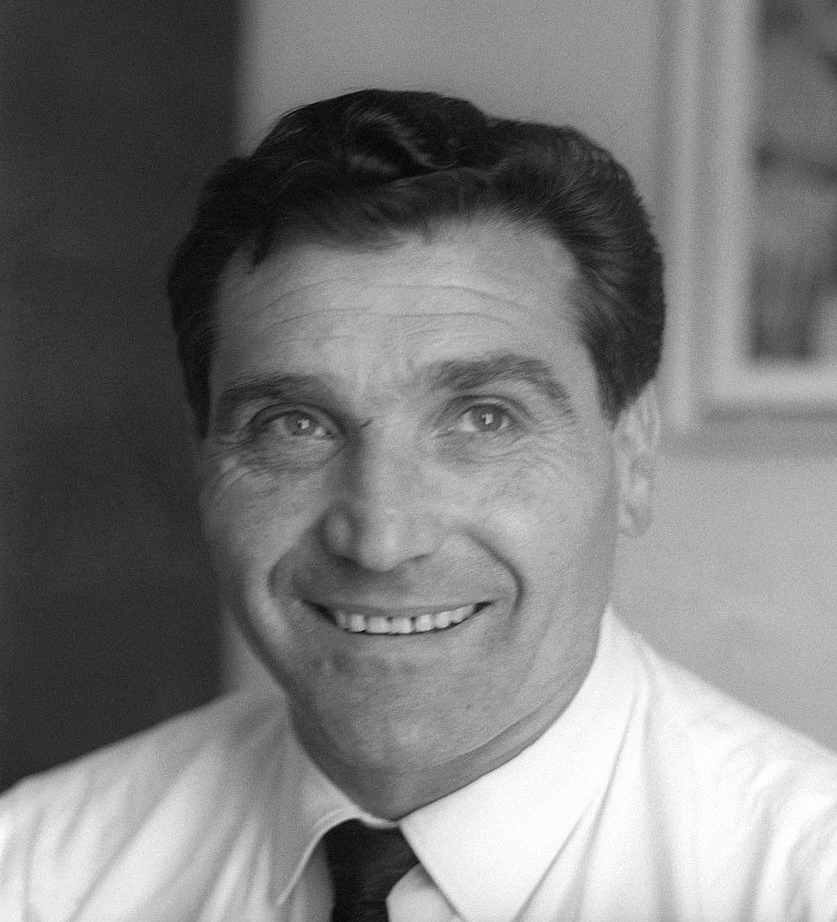

Personal information
- Nationality: Italian
- Born: 5 January 1917 Costermano, Italy
- Died: 20 December 1969 (aged 52) Milan, Italy
- Height: 1.83 m (6 ft 0 in)
- Weight: 100 kg (220 lb)

Sport
- Country: Italy
- Sport: Athletics
- Event: Discus throw
- Club: G.S. Pirelli Milano

Achievements and titles
- Personal best: 56.98 m (1955)
Medal record
Men's athletics
Representing Italy
Olympic Games
Gold medal – first place	1948 London	Discus throw
Silver medal – second place	1952 Helsinki	Discus throw
European Championships
Gold medal – first place	1946 Oslo	Discus throw
Gold medal – first place	1950 Brussels	Discus throw
Gold medal – first place	1954 Berne	Discus throw
Mediterranean Games
Gold medal – first place	1955 Barcelona	Discus throw

Adolfo Consolini (5 January 1917 – 20 December 1969) was an Italian discus thrower. He competed at the 1948, 1952, 1956 and 1960 Olympics and finished in 1st, 2nd, 6th and 17 place, respectively. While winning the gold medal in 1948 he set an Olympic record at 52.78 m. Consolini won three European titles, in 1946, 1950 and 1954, and 15 national titles.

== Biography ==
Consolini was the youngest of five children in a farmer family. His first athletics competition was a local stone throwing contest in 1937. A few months later he started training in the discus and won the British AAA Championships title at the 1938 AAA Championships. Shortly afterwards in September, he finished fifth at the European championships, and in 1939 won the first of his 15 national titles. In 1941 he set a new world record at 53.34 m, which he extended to 54.23 m in 1946 and to 55.33 m in 1948.

Consolini retired from top sport after the 1960 Olympics, but continued competing at the national level until the age of 52, when he threw 43.94 m in Milan. He married Hanny Cuk, an Austrian, and had a son Sergio with her. The family settled in Milan where Consolini worked at Pirelli company the rest of his life. He died aged 52 from a viral hepatitis.

== Achievements ==
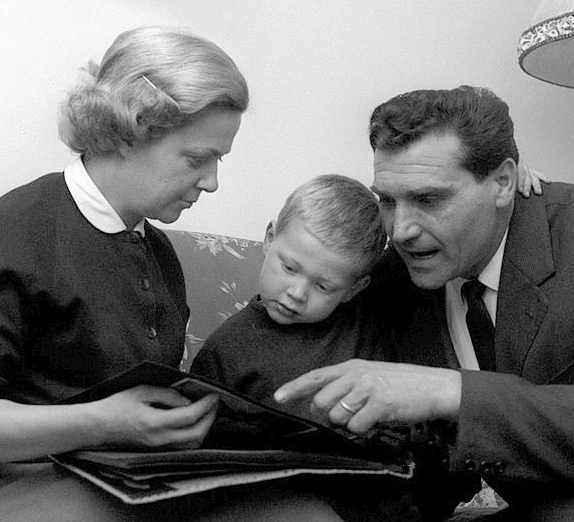
Consolini with family in the 1950s

Year	Competition	Venue	Position	Event	Measure	Notes
1948	Olympic Games	(United Kingdom) London	1st	Discus throw	52.78 m	OR
1952	Olympic Games	(Finland) Helsinki	2nd	Discus throw	53.78 m	
1956	Olympic Games	(Australia) Melbourne	6th	Discus throw	52.21 m	
1960	Olympic Games	(Italy) Rome	17th	Discus throw	52.44 m	

== National titles ==
He won fifteen times the national championships at senior level.

- Italian Athletics Championships
  - Discus throw: 1939, 1941, 1942, 1945, 1949, 1950, 1952, 1953, 1954, 1955, 1956, 1957, 1958, 1959, 1960

== See also ==
- Legends of Italian sport - Walk of Fame
- FIDAL Hall of Fame
- Italy national athletics team - More caps
- Italian Athletics Championships - Multi winners

Records
Preceded by Archie Harris	Men's discus world record holder 26 October 1941 – 8 June 1946	Succeeded by Bob Fitch
Preceded by Bob Fitch	Men's discus world record holder 10 October 1948 – 9 July 1949	Succeeded by Fortune Gordien
Preceded by Willy Schröder	Men's discus European record holder 26 October 1941 – 22 August 1948	Succeeded by Giuseppe Tosi
Preceded by Giuseppe Tosi	Men's discus European record holder 18 September 1948 – 4 July 1954	Succeeded by Ferenc Klics
Preceded by Karel Merta	Men's discus European record holder 11 December 1955 – 10 May 1959	Succeeded by Edmund Piatkowski
