= Hermann Tunner =

Austrian discus thrower

Personal information
- Nationality: Austrian
- Born: 17 May 1913
- Died: 25 August 1985 (aged 72)

Sport
- Sport: Athletics
- Event: Discus throw

Hermann Tunner (17 May 1913 – 25 August 1985) was an Austrian athlete. He competed in the men's discus throw at the 1948 Summer Olympics, placing eleventh.
