= Lucien Guillier =

French discus thrower and shot putter (1926–2019)

Lucien Guillier (19 December 1926 in Paris – 4 December 2019 in Villepinte) was a French discus thrower and shot putter who competed in the 1952 Summer Olympics.
