= Ferenc Klics =

Hungarian discus thrower

Personal information
- Nationality: Hungarian
- Born: 20 January 1924 Hercegfalva, Mezőfalva, Fejér, Hungary
- Died: 25 April 1993 (aged 69) Budapest, Hungary
- Height: 178 cm (5 ft 10 in)
- Weight: 99 kg (218 lb)

Sport
- Sport: Athletics
- Event: discus throw
- Club: Vasas, Budapest

Ferenc Klics (Hungarian: [ˈfɛrɛnt͡s ˈklit͡ʃ]; 20 January 1924 – 25 April 1993) was a Hungarian athlete who competed in the 1948 Summer Olympics, 1952 Summer Olympics, 1956 Summer Olympics, and in the 1960 Summer Olympics. He was born in Hercegfalva and died in Budapest.

Klics won the British AAA Championships title in the discus throw event at the 1949 AAA Championships and at the 1954 AAA Championships.
