= Stein Johnson =

Norwegian discus thrower and speed skater

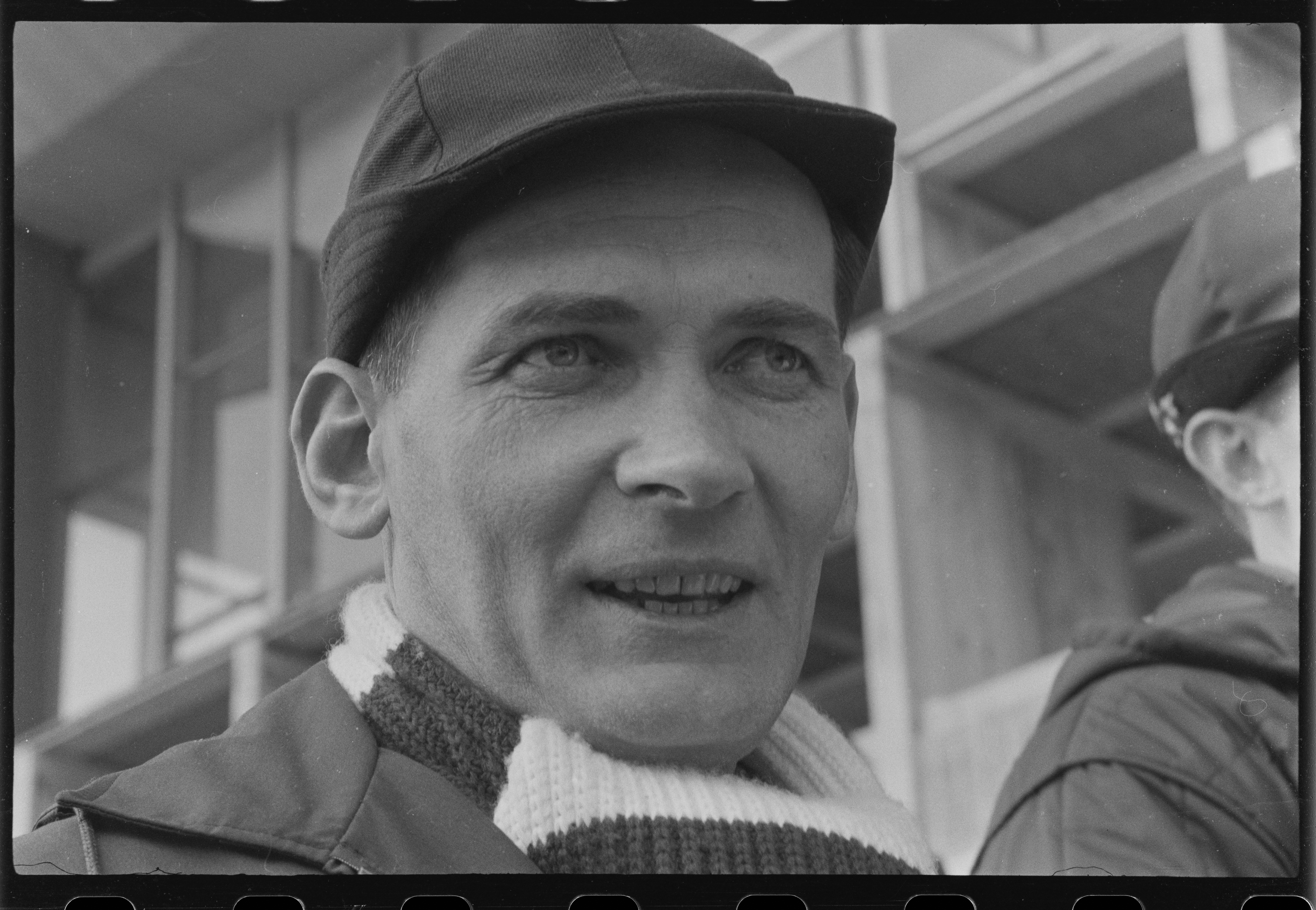
Jean Johnson at the 1964 Innsbruck Olympics 500m ice skating.

Sten ("Stein") Jean Johnson (20 October 1921 – 28 April 2012) was a Norwegian speed skating trainer and athlete. He was born in Bergen and is the nephew of Sonja Johnsson.

Johnson was a competitor in discus throw in the 1948 (where he finished eighth) and 1952 Summer Olympics. In addition he finished fifth at the 1946 European Championships and fourth at the 1950 European Championships.

He later became trainer for the Norwegian national speed skating team. By applying scientific methods, he brought the competitors to an until then unknown level of achievement, which again brought a score of records and results, for instance by the Norwegian skaters Nils Aaness, Knut Johannesen, Per Ivar Moe, and Magne Thomassen winning the first four positions in the 1963 European Speed Skating Championships. This became known as the Norwegian speed skating revolution, and Stein Johnson's methods were soon adopted by other countries.

Johnson was awarded the Egebergs Ærespris and the Kniksen award in 2005 for his achievements as a coach.

Awards
Preceded by Trond Einar Elden	Egebergs Ærespris; 2005	Succeeded by Lars Berger
