= Mark Pharaoh =

British discus thrower, shot putter, and hammer thrower (1931–2020)

Personal information
- Born: 18 July 1931 Wandsworth, Greater London, England
- Died: 27 April 2020 (aged 88) Malvern, England
- Height: 190 cm (6 ft 3 in)
- Weight: 95 kg (209 lb)

Sport
- Sport: track and field
- Event: discus throw
- Club: Manchester University AC; Walton AC
Medal record
Men's athletics
Representing Great Britain
World Student Games
Gold medal – first place	1953 Dortmund	Discus throw
Silver medal – second place	1953 Dortmund	Shot put
Silver medal – second place	1953 Dortmund	Hammer throw
Representing England
Commonwealth Games
Bronze medal – third place	1954 Vancouver	Discus throw

Mark Pharaoh (18 July 1931 – 27 April 2020) was a track and field athlete, who competed in the discus throw at both the 1952 Helsinki Olympics and the 1956 Melbourne Olympics where he came fourth. This has been described as by far the finest single achievement in British discus history. He was also an international shot put and hammer thrower.

== Biography ==
Pharaoh was born 18 July 1931 and as a youth attended Manchester Grammar School where he excelled at sport and was an active member of the Gannet patrol of Troop 4 of the school's scouts. He went on to study at Manchester University.

Pharaoh became the British discus throw champion after winning the British AAA Championships title at the 1952 AAA Championships. Shortly afterwards he represented the Great Britain team at the 1952 Olympic Games in Helsinki.

Pharaoh successfully retained his title at the 1953 AAA Championships. He represented the English team at the 1954 British Empire and Commonwealth Games held in Vancouver, Canada, finishing fifth in the shot put. He finished second in the hammer at the 1953 Summer International University Sports Week.

At the 1956 Summer Olympics, he came fourth, setting a British record of 54.27 m. in the process and missing the bronze medal by just 13 cm. Pharaoh also represented Walton Athletic Club in Walton-on-Thames.

Pharaoh won two more AAA titles at the 1955 AAA Championships and the 1956 AAA Championships.

== National titles ==
- AAA Championships: 1952, 1953, 1955, 1956
