= Roland Nilsson (shot putter) =

Swedish shot putter and discus thrower

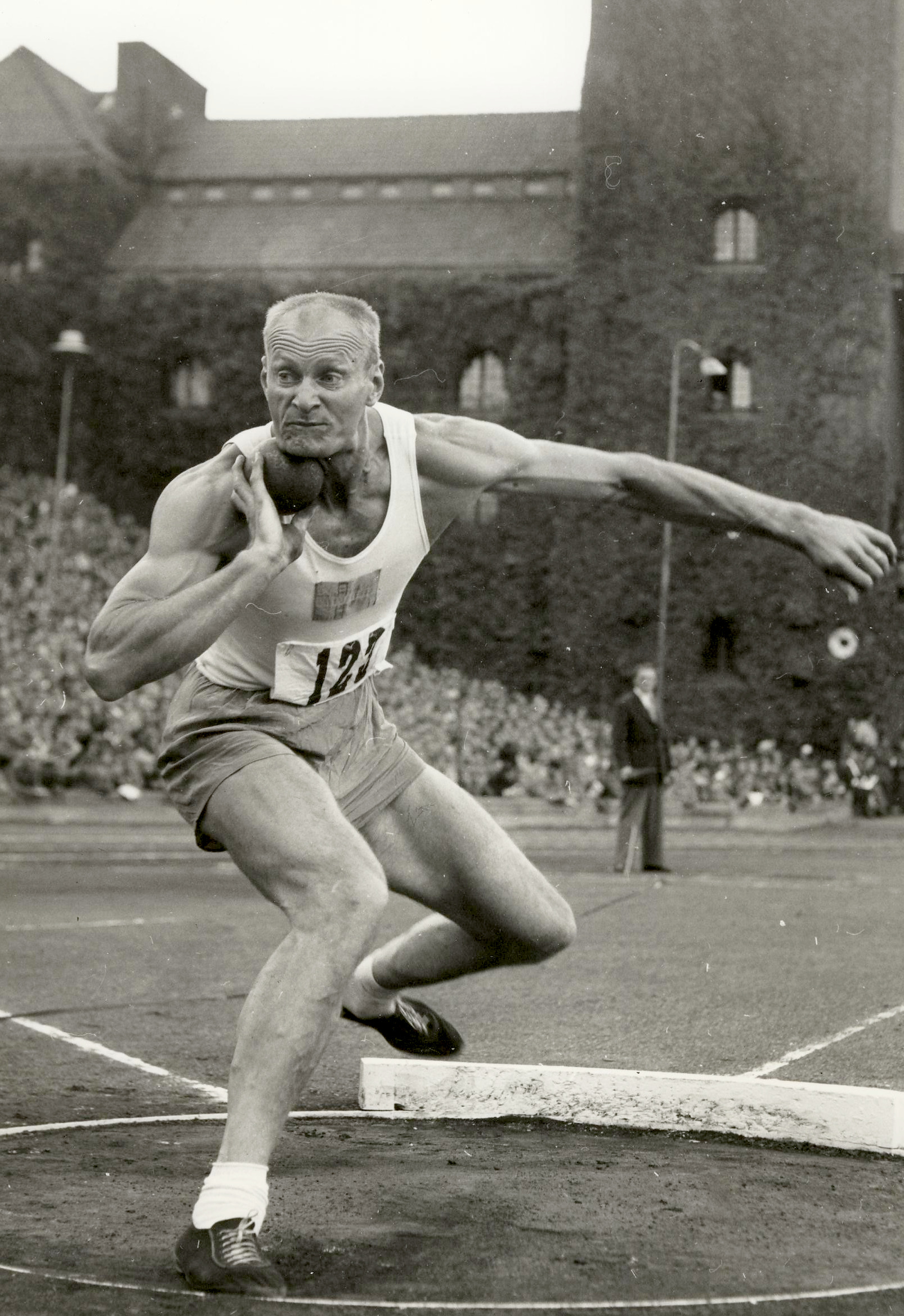

Personal information
- Born: November 26, 1924 Svanöbruk, Västernorrland, Sweden
- Died: February 21, 2014 (aged 89) Alton, Illinois, United States
- Height: 1.96 m (6 ft 5 in)
- Weight: 105 kg (231 lb)

Sport
- Sport: Athletics
- Event(s): Shot put, discus throw
- Club: F11 IF, Nyköping (SWE); Westermalms IF; Michigan Wolverines, Ann Arbor

Achievements and titles
- Personal best(s): SP – 17.00 m (1953); DT – 54.54 m (1954)

Fritz Roland Nilsson (November 26, 1924 – February 21, 2014) was an athlete who was a member of the Swedish Olympic teams in 1948 and 1952. He was also a member of the Michigan Wolverines men's track and field team. He won six Big Ten Conference championships in the shot put and five event championships at the Penn Relays.

== Biography ==
Nilsson was born in 1924 on the island of Svanö in the Ångerman River in northern Sweden. His father was a factory worker. He graduated from the Sundsvall trade school in 1944 and worked as a civilian mechanic and for the Swedish Air Force.

Nilsson was 6 feet, 6 inches tall and weighed 230 pounds. The track coach at the Sundsvall trade school, John Nyman, had won a silver medal for Sweden in the 1936 Summer Olympics in Berlin. Nyman later recalled that Nyman taught him how to run, jump and throw the discus. Nilsson competed for Sweden in the 1948 Summer Olympics but did not make the finals.

Nilsson left Sweden in November 1949 and moved to Detroit, Michigan where two of his siblings had immigrated in 1923. In the spring of 1950, a neighbor introduced Nilsson to the University of Michigan's track coach, Don Canham. Canham invited Nilsson to come to Ann Arbor and meet Michigan's world-record holder in the shot put, Charlie Fonville. On his visit to Ann Arbor, Canham asked Nilsson to throw the discus, and Nilsson threw it 166 feet—more than three feet better than Michigan's varsity record.

Canham invited Nilsson to attend the university and compete on Michigan's track team. Nilsson worked with Fonville through the summer of 1950 while taking English classes to improve his language skills. After enrolling at the University of Michigan in the fall of 1950, Nilsson became the subject of extensive newspaper coverage. The Associated Press ran a feature story on him in January 1951 in which Fonville described Nilsson's talent with the discus: "He can drop it farther than I can throw it."

Nilsson became a track and field star at the University of Michigan. In six Big Ten indoor and outdoor championships from 1952 to 1954, Nilsson won the shot put competition all six times. Only one other Michigan track athlete, "Big Bill" Watson, has won six Big Ten track and field championships.

Nilsson also excelled in competition at the Penn Relays in Philadelphia. In his three years competing in the Penn Relays, Nilsson won five event championships, three in the shot put and two in the discus. He also set a Penn Relays record in the discus with a throw of 174 feet, 3-7/8 inches in 1955. Nilsson was listed on the Penn Relays Wall of Fame in 2009.

At the 1952 Summer Olympics in Helsinki, Nilsson finished fourth in the shot put and seventh in the discus throw.

In 2006, Nilsson was one of the inaugural inductees into the University of Michigan Track & Field Hall of Fame.

He died in 2014 at the age of 89.

== Competitions ==
- At the European championships Nilsson finished fourth in shot put in 1946 and 1954 and fifth in discus throw in 1954.
- March 1952: At the Big Ten Conference indoor track and field competition held in Chicago, Nilsson won the shot put competition with a throw of 53 feet, 7-3/4 inches.
- April 1952: At the Southern Relays in Birmingham, Alabama, Nilsson won the shot put competition with a throw of 53 feet, 10 inches. He also placed second in the discus throw.
- April 1952: At the Penn Relays, Nilsson won the discus throw and took second place in the shot put.
- May 1952: At the Big Ten outdoor track and field championships, held on Ferry Field in Ann Arbor, Michigan, Nilsson won the shot put competition with a throw of 54 feet, 2 inches. His discus throw of 157 feet, 1-1/4 inches placed second behind George Holm of Minnesota.
- June 1952: At the NCAA outdoor track and field meet in Berkeley, California, Nilsson finished third in the shot put with a throw of 53 feet, 3-3/4 inches.
- July 1952: At the 1952 Summer Olympics in Helsinki, Nilsson competed for Sweden and finished fifth in the shot put with a distance of 16.33 meters. Parry O'Brien of the United States won the gold medal with a new Olympic record of 17.41 meters. He also finished seventh in the discus throw.
- August 1952: At the international track and field meet in Gothenburg, Sweden, Nilsson finished second in the shot put with a throw of 15.76 meters (51 feet, 8.28 inches).
- March 1953: At the Big Ten indoor track and field championships in Champaign, Illinois, Nilsson won the shot put competition with a throw of 53 feet, 11 inches.
- April 1953: At the Penn Relays, Nilsson won the championships in both the discus (154 feet, 3-7/8 inches) and shot put.
- May 1953: At the Big Ten outdoor track and field championships in Champaign, Illinois, Nilsson won the individual championships in both the discus and the shot put. His winning throw in the shot put was 54 feet, 6-1/4 inches, and his winning throw in the discus was 164 feet, 3 inches.
- March 1954: At the Big Ten indoor track and field meet in Champaign, Illinois, Nilsson won his shot put competition—his third consecutive championship in the event at the Big Ten indoor meet.
- April 1954: In a dual meet against Stanford in Palo Alto, California, Nilsson won both the shot put (54 feet 6 inches) and discus (161 feet, 5-1/2 inches).
- April 1954: At the Penn Relays, Nilsson won his third consecutive event championship in the shot put with a throw of 55 feet, 4-1/4 inches. He also won his second consecutive championship in the discus.
- May 1954: At the Big Ten outdoor track and field championships in Lafayette, Indiana, Nilsson won the shot put event, marking his sixth Big Ten championship in the event—three indoor and three outdoor—from 1952 to 1954. His discus throw of 158 feet, 9 inches placed second behind Michigan teammate Roy Pella who threw the discus 160 feet, 6-5/8 inches.
