= Athletics at the 1952 Summer Olympics – Men's 10 kilometres walk =

Men's 10 kilometres walk at the Games of the XV Olympiad
- Dates: July 24, 1952 (heats); July 27, 1952 (final)

Medalists
1st place, gold medalist(s)		John Mikaelsson; Sweden
2nd place, silver medalist(s)		Fritz Schwab; Switzerland
3rd place, bronze medalist(s)		Bruno Junk; Soviet Union

The men's 10 kilometres walk event at the 1952 Summer Olympic Games took place July 24 and July 27. The final was won by Swede John Mikaelsson, who won the event four years prior in 1948. This was the last time this event took place and was replaced by the 20 kilometres walk in 1956.

== Results ==
=== Heats ===
The first round was held on July 24. The first six athletes from each heat advanced to the final.

Heat 1

Rank	Name	Nationality	Time (hand)	Notes
1	Bruno Junk	Soviet Union	45:05.8	
2	John Mikaelsson	Sweden	45:10.0	
3	Louis Chevalier	France	45:58.0	
4	Gabriel Reymond	Switzerland	46:35.2	
5	Don Keane	Australia	46:55.2	
6	Ivan Yarmysh	Soviet Union	47:26.0	
7	Arne Börjesson	Sweden	47:32.4	
8	Kaare Hammer	Norway	49:08.4	
9	Ragnvald Thunestvedt	Denmark	50:42.8	
	Allah Ditta	Pakistan	DQ	
	Henry Laskau	United States	DQ	
	Roland Hardy	Great Britain	DQ	
	Salvatore Cascino	Italy	DNS	

Heat 2

Rank	Name	Nationality	Time (hand)	Notes
1	George Coleman	Great Britain	46:12.4	
2	Émile Maggi	France	46:47.8	
3	Lars Hindmar	Sweden	47:06.0	
4	Fritz Schwab	Switzerland	47:06.0	
5	Josef Doležal	Czechoslovakia	47:06.2	
6	Bruno Fait	Italy	47:23.4	
7	Telemaco Arcangeli	Italy	48:00.2	
8	Ragnar Olsen	Norway	49:03.8	
9	Price King	United States	51:08.6	
	Lawrence Allen	Great Britain	DQ	
	Pēteris Zeltiņš	Soviet Union	DQ	
	Ferd Hayward	Canada	DNS	

=== Final ===
Rank	Name	Nationality	Time (hand)	Notes
1st place, gold medalist(s)	John Mikaelsson	Sweden	45:02.8	OR
2nd place, silver medalist(s)	Fritz Schwab	Switzerland	45:41.0	
3rd place, bronze medalist(s)	Bruno Junk	Soviet Union	45:41.0	
4	Louis Chevalier	France	45:50.4	
5	George Coleman	Great Britain	46:06.8	
6	Ivan Yarmysh	Soviet Union	46:07.0	
7	Émile Maggi	France	46:08.0	
8	Bruno Fait	Italy	46:25.6	
9	Gabriel Reymond	Switzerland	46:38.6	
10	Don Keane	Australia	47:37.0	
	Lars Hindmar	Sweden	DQ	
	Josef Doležal	Sweden	DNS	
