= Deaths in March 2004 =

The following is a list of notable deaths in March 2004.

Entries for each day are listed alphabetically by surname. A typical entry lists information in the following sequence:

- Name, age, country of citizenship at birth, subsequent country of citizenship (if applicable), reason for notability, cause of death (if known), and reference.

== March 2004 ==
=== 1 ===
- Eric Cross, 101, English cinematographer.
- Augusto da Costa, 83, Brazilian football player and manager.
- Barbara Frawley, 68, Australian actress (Dot and the Kangaroo).
- Mian Ghulam Jilani, 91, Pakistan Army officer, pneumonia.
- Douglas Lima, 71, Brazilian Olympic water polo player (1952).
- Tadjidine Ben Said Massounde, 70, Comorian politician.
- Kostas Montis, 90, Cypriot poet, novelist, and playwright, tuberculosis.
- Gilbert Plass, 83, Canadian physicist.
- Nina Sazonova, 87, Soviet and Russian actress.
- Svante Törnvall, 87, Chilean Olympic water polo player (1948).

=== 2 ===
- Berndt Egerbladh, 71, Swedish jazz pianist, composer and television personality.
- Tony Lee, 69, British jazz pianist, cancer.
- Cormac McAnallen, 24, Irish Gaelic footballer.
- Mercedes McCambridge, 87, American actress (All the King's Men, Giant, The Exorcist), Oscar winner (1950).
- Marge Schott, 75, American primary owner of the Cincinnati Reds.

=== 3 ===
- Cecily Adams, 46, American casting director (That '70s Show, 3rd Rock from the Sun) and actress (Star Trek: Deep Space Nine), lung cancer.
- Chun Hon Chan, 68, Canadian Olympic weightlifter (1968, 1972).
- Sumantra Ghoshal, 55, Indian scholar and educator, founding dean of Indian School of Business, brain hemorrhage. .
- Susan Moller Okin, 57, New Zealand feminist and political philosopher.
- Pedro Pietri, 59, Puerto Rican-American Nuyorican poet and playwright, stomach cancer.
- Muniswamy Rajgopal, 77, Indian Olympic field hockey player (1952).
- Drake Sather, 44, American Emmy nominated television writer (Dennis Miller Show, The Larry Sanders Show, Saturday Night Live, Zoolander), suicide.
- Miriam Waddington, 86, Canadian poet, short story writer and translator.
- Russell Weigley, 73, American professor and military historian.

=== 4 ===
- Fernando Lázaro Carreter, 80, Spanish linguist, journalist and literary critic, multiple organ dysfunction syndrome.
- Meryle Fitzgerald, 79, American baseball player.
- Tooker Gomberg, 48, Canadian politician and environmental activist, suicide by jumping.
- Walter Gómez, 76, Uruguayan football player.
- David Charles Harvey, 57, British historian and author.
- Dale Ishimoto, 80, American actor.
- Arthur Kinsella, 86, New Zealand politician, Minister of Education (1963–1969).
- Roberto Lerici, 79, Italian football player and coach.
- José Machado, 76, Portuguese Olympic rower (1948).
- John McGeoch, 48, British guitarist (Magazine, Siouxsie and the Banshees and PiL), SUDEP.
- Claude Nougaro, 74, French songwriter and singer, pancreatic cancer.
- George Pake, 79, American physicist and computer research executive, known for founding Xerox PARC.
- Malcolm Pasley, 77, British literary scholar.
- Jeremi Przybora, 88, Polish poet, writer, actor and singer.
- Stephen Sprouse, 50, American artist and fashion designer, heart failure.
- Dale O. Thomas, 81, American wrestling coach and Olympic wrestler (1956).

=== 5 ===
- Thorkild Bjørnvig, 86, Danish author and poet.
- Jair Braga, 49, Brazilian Olympic cyclist (1984).
- Nicholas C. Dattilo, 71, American prelate of the Roman Catholic Church.
- Walt Gorney, 91, Austrian-American actor (Friday the 13th, Trading Places).
- Pierre Lévêque, 82, French historian of ancient and Hellenistic Greece.
- Carlos Julio Arosemena Monroy, 84, Ecuadorian politician, President (1961–1963).
- Stanisław Musiał, 65, Polish priest.
- Mike O'Callaghan, 74, American politician, Governor of Nevada (1971–1979), heart attack.
- Masanori Tokita, 78, Japanese football player and Olympian (1956), esophageal cancer.

=== 6 ===
- Eugene Theodore Booth Jr., 91, American nuclear physicist.
- Peggy Butts, 79, Canadian politician, member of the Senate of Canada (1997-1999).
- Frances Dee, 94, American actress, stroke.
- Ray Fernandez, 47, American professional wrestler best known as "Hercules Hernandez", heart disease.
- Sandy Glen, 91, Scottish explorer and businessman.
- Max Harris, 85, British film and television composer and arranger.
- Phil Hergesheimer, 89, Canadian ice hockey player (Chicago Black Hawks, Boston Bruins).
- Alan Short, 83, American legislator, co-author of the Short-Doyle Mental Health Act.
- André Weingand, 88, French Olympic gymnast (1948, 1952).
- John Henry Williams, 35, American controversial son of baseball player Ted Williams, leukemia.

=== 7 ===
- Ewald W. Busse, 86, American psychiatrist, gerontologist, and author.
- Nicolae Cajal, 84, Romanian physician and politician.
- Ernest G. Cottreau, 90, Canadian politician, member of the Senate of Canada (1974-1989).
- Bengt Fahlqvist, 81, Swedish wrestler and Olympic medalist (1948, 1952).
- Jack Holden, 96, English long-distance runner and Olympian (1948).
- Michael Stringer, 79, British production designer and art director (Casino Royale, Fiddler on the Roof, 633 Squadron).
- Román Arrieta Villalobos, 79, Costa Rican Catholic archbishop, brain tumor.
- Paul Winfield, 64, American actor (Sounder, The Terminator, 227), Emmy winner (1995), heart attack.

=== 8 ===
- János Bognár, 89, Hungarian Olympic cyclist (1936).
- Sivaramakrishna Chandrasekhar, 73, Indian physicist.
- Keith Hopkins, 69, British ancient historian and sociologist.
- Robin Hunter, 74, British actor, pulmonary emphysema.
- Eloise Jones, 86, Canadian politician, member of the House of Commons of Canada (1964-1965).
- Duan Junyi, 93, Chinese politician.
- Alfons Lütke-Westhues, 73, German equestrian and Olympic champion (1956).
- Frank Mooney, 82, New Zealand cricketer.
- Robert Pastorelli, 49, American actor (Murphy Brown, Eraser, Michael), drug overdose.
- Ehrenfried Patzel, 89, Czechoslovak football player.
- Siddharth Ray, 40, Indian actor, heart attack.
- Yavuz Selekman, 67, Turkish wrestler, film actor, and Olympian (1964).
- Mario Uggeri, 80, Italian comics artist.
- Muhammad Zaidan, (aka Abu Abbas), 55, Palestinian nationalist, founder of the Palestinian Liberation Front, cardiovascular disease.

=== 9 ===
- Nikola Delev, 79, Bulgarian Olympic skier (1948).
- Rust Epique, 35, American songwriter and guitarist, heart attack.
- Marshall Frady, 64, American journalist, cancer.
- John Mayer, 73, Indian composer, traffic collision.
- Albert Mol, 87, Dutch author, dancer, cabaret performer, actor, TV personality, aneurysm.
- Gearóid Mac Niocaill, 71, British academic and historian.
- Hermann Palka, 82, Austrian Olympic bobsledder (1952).
- Coleridge-Taylor Perkinson, 71, American composer, conductor and pianist.
- Don Smith, 52, American professional basketball player (Philadelphia 76ers), heart problems.

=== 10 ===
- Olle Adolphson, 69, Swedish writer, singer and songwriter.
- Boryslav Brondukov, 66, Ukrainian film actor, stroke.
- Herbert Choy, 88, American circuit judge (United States Court of Appeals for the Ninth Circuit).
- Jack Creley, 78, American-Canadian actor.
- Murray Evans, 84, American football player (Detroit Lions), and coach.
- Norbert Grupe, 63, German boxer and actor (Die Hard, Stroszek, Ghostbusters II), prostate cancer.
- Robert D. Orr, 86, American politician, former Governor of Indiana, surgical complications.
- James Parrish, 35, American NFL player (San Francisco 49ers, Pittsburgh Steelers, New York Jets), cancer.
- Hansjörg Schlager, 74, German Olympic alpine skier (1972).
- Dave Schulthise, 47, American bassist (The Dead Milkmen).
- David Shoenberg, 93, British physicist (solid-state electronics, magnetic resonance imaging, superconductivity).
- Nasiba Zeynalova, 87, Soviet and Azerbaijani actress.

=== 11 ===
- Philip Arthur Fisher, 96, American stock investor and author of Common Stocks and Uncommon Profits.
- Seymour Geisser, 74, American statistician, DNA-evidence expert.
- Marian Jabłoński, 82, Polish footballer.
- Richard Kinon, 79, American television director.
- Aleksey Mazurenko, 86, Russian major general during World War II.
- Jack Nagel, 78, American alpine skier and Olympian (1952).
- Nelu Stănescu, 46, Romanian footballer.
- Edmund Sylvers, 47, American lead singer of The Sylvers, lung cancer.

=== 12 ===
- Finn Carling, 78, Norwegian author and playwright with cerebral palsy.
- Cid Corman, 79, Japan-based American poet and translator, heart attack.
- Karel Kachyňa, 79, Czech film director and screenwriter.
- William Moritz, 63, American film historian, cancer.
- Milton Resnick, 87, Ukrainian-American artist, suicide.
- Sylvi Saimo, 89, Finnish Olympic canoer (1948, 1952).
- Natan Yonatan, 80, Israeli poet.

=== 13 ===
- Guttorm Berge, 74, Norwegian alpine skier and Olympic medalist (1952, 1956).
- Sydney Carter, 88, British musician and poet.
- Harold Goldsmith, 73, American Olympic foil and epee fencer (1952, 1956, 1960).
- Chen Hansheng, 107, Chinese sociologist.
- Vilayat Khan, 75, Indian classical sitar player, lung cancer.
- Franz König, 98, Austrian cardinal.
- Thomas Adeoye Lambo, 80, Nigerian scholar, administrator and psychiatrist.
- Blessing Makunike, 27, Zimbabwean football player, traffic collision.
- Dullah Omar, 69, South African cabinet minister, cancer.
- Alwyn Warren, 72, Australian Olympic soccer player (1956).
- Vernon Wilcox, 84, Australian politician.

=== 14 ===
- Siradiou Diallo, 67, Guinean journalist and politician, cardiac arrest.
- Martin Emond, 34, New Zealand cartoon illustrator and painter, suicide by hanging.
- Genevieve, 83, American comedian, actress, and singer.
- Norb Hecker, 76, American football player (Los Angeles Rams, Washington Redskins), and coach (Atlanta Falcons), cancer.
- Claus Mørch Sr., 91, Norwegian Olympic fencer (1948).
- Jurijs Rubenis, 78, Latvian communist politician.

=== 15 ===
- Vedie Himsl, 86, American baseball player and coach.
- John Hobhouse, Baron Hobhouse of Woodborough, 72, British barrister and judge.
- Václav Kozák, 66, Czech rower and Olympic champion (1960, 1964, 1968).
- René Laloux, 74, French animator, screenwriter and film director, heart attack.
- Philippe Lemaire, 77, French actor, suicide.
- Alfred Mansfeld, 92, Israeli architect.
- Chuck Niles, 76, American Southern California jazz radio disc jockey.
- Patrick Nuttgens, 74, British architect.
- Bill Pickering, 93, New Zealand engineer, head of Jet Propulsion Laboratory, pneumonia.
- John Pople, 78, British theoretical chemist and Nobel Prize winner, liver cancer.
- Ivan Ryzhov, 91, Soviet and Russian film and theater actor.
- Vicki Shiran, 57, Israeli criminologist, sociologist, poet, film director, and activist, breast cancer.
- Rajmund Stachurski, 68, Polish Olympic sports shooter (1968, 1972).
- John Vallone, 50, American production designer (Star Trek: The Motion Picture, Predator, 48 Hrs.).

=== 16 ===
- Brian Bianchini, 25, American fashion model, suicide by hanging.
- Hank Marr, 77, American jazz musician.
- Shamseddin Seyed-Abbasi, 61, Iranian Olympic wrestler (1968, 1972).
- Vilém Tauský, 94, Czech conductor and composer.

=== 17 ===
- Jan Van Der Auwera, 80, Belgian footballer.
- José Giorgetti, 69, Argentine Olympic boxer (1956).
- J.J. Jackson, 62, American radio and television personality, heart attack.
- Monique Laederach, 65, Swiss writer.
- Alfredo Massazza, 60, Italian Olympic archer (1972).
- Michael Mellinger, 74, German actor.
- Bernie Scherer, 91, American gridiron football player (University of Nebraska, Green Bay Packers, Pittsburgh Pirates).

=== 18 ===
- Gene Bearden, 83, American baseball player with the Cleveland Indians.
- Vytas Brenner, 57, Venezuelan musician, keyboardist and composer, heart attack.
- Orlando Cossani, 71, Argentine Olympic swimmer (1952).
- Wallace Davenport, 78, American jazz trumpeter.
- Louisette Hautecoeur, 89, French film editor.
- Richard Marner, 82, Russian-British actor.
- Harrison McCain, 76, Canadian businessman, founder of McCain Foods, kidney failure.
- Raquel Rodrigo, 89, Cuban actress and singer.
- Abdujalil Samadov, 54, Tajik politician.
- Erna Spoorenberg, 77, Dutch soprano.
- Livio Tesconi, 68, Italian Olympic rower (1956).

=== 19 ===
- Roy Abbott, 76, Australian politician.
- Bert Barlow, 87, English football player.
- Guillermo Rivas «el Borras», 76, Mexican comedy actor, pneumonia.
- Alfred Younges Kirkland Sr., 86, American district judge (United States District Court for the Northern District of Illinois).
- Magool, 55, Somali singer, breast cancer.
- Brian Maxwell, 51, Canadian long-distance runner and founder of energy bar brand PowerBar, heart attack.
- Horace Phillips, 86, British diplomat.
- Mitchell Sharp, 92, Canadian cabinet minister (member of Parliament, Minister of Foreign Affairs, Minister of Finance), prostate cancer.
- Ladislaus Simacek, 90, Austrian Olympic steeplechase runner (1936).
- Chris Timms, 56, New Zealand yachtsman and Olympic champion (1984, 1988), plane crash.
- Ted Walker, 69, British poet and dramatist.

=== 20 ===
- Bernhard Christensen, 98, Danish composer and organist.
- Scott Fraser, 33, Canadian racing driver.
- Charles Harold Haden II, 66, American jurist.
- Chōsuke Ikariya, 72, Japanese comedian, actor and leader of comedic group The Drifters, lymphoma.
- Juliana of the Netherlands, 94, Dutch Royal, former Queen of the Netherlands, complications of pneumonia.
- Joakim Segedi, 99, Serbian-Croatian Greek-Catholic hierarch, Auxiliary Bishop of Križevci (1963–1984)
- Pierre Sévigny, 86, Canadian member of Parliament (House of Commons representing Longueuil—Saint-Hubert, Quebec), known for Munsinger Affair.

=== 21 ===
- Adeline Akufo-Addo, 86, First Lady in the second republic of Ghana as the wife of Edward Akufo-Addo.
- Johnny Bristol, 65, American musician.
- C. West Churchman, 90, American philosopher and systems scientist.
- Matt Gribble, 41, American swimmer, Olympic athlete (1984), and world champion, traffic collision.
- Nurnaningsih, 78, Indonesian actress.
- Curt Piercy, 41, American racing driver, plane crash.
- Jean-François Ravelinghien, 56, French Olympic swimmer (1968).
- Mirwais Sadiq, Afghan politician, homicide.
- Robert Snyder, 88, American documentary filmmaker (winner of Academy Award for Best Documentary Feature for The Titan: Story of Michelangelo).
- Ludmilla Tchérina, 79, French ballerina, actress and writer.
- Muhammad Umer, 68-69, Pakistani footballer.
- John C. West, 81, American politician and diplomat.

=== 22 ===
- Mirko Braun, 61, Croatian football player.
- Lisa Ferraday, 83, Romanian-American model and actress.
- Scott Gale, 39, Australian rugby league footballer.
- Germán Gómez, 90, Spanish footballer.
- Peter Jackson, 73, British rugby union player.
- Pete Kelly, 90, Canadian ice hockey player (St. Louis Eagles, Detroit Red Wings, New York/Brooklyn Americans).
- Slobodan Kovačević, 57, Yugoslavian/Bosnia and Herzegovina rock guitarists, liver cancer.
- Janet Akyüz Mattei, 61, Turkish-American astronomer, leukemia.
- V. M. Tarkunde, 94, Indian lawyer, civil rights activist, and humanist leader.
- Ahmed Yassin, 67, Palestinian spiritual leader and founder of Hamas, military operation.
- Boonreung Buachan, 34, Thai snake handler, cobra bite.

=== 23 ===
- Lorand Fenyves, 86, Canadian violinist and professor.
- Sir Rupert Hamer, 87, Australian politician, heart failure.
- Otto Kumm, 94, German divisional commander in the Waffen-SS during World War II.
- Pedro Pablo Sará, 80, Argentine footballer.
- L. S. Stavrianos, 91, Greek-Canadian historian.
- Lou Tomasetti, 88, American football player.

=== 24 ===
- Morgan Adams, 88, American Olympic sailor (1936).
- Dominic Agostino, 44, Canadian politician, Ontario Liberal MPP, liver cancer.
- Joshua Eilberg, 83, American politician, member of the United States House of Representatives (1967-1979).
- Michael Garrison, 47, American ambient musician, liver failure.
- Mildred Jeffrey, 93, American political and social activist.
- Richard Leech, 81, Irish actor.
- Fred Sharaga, 94, American Olympic racewalker (1948).
- Bernhard Termath, 75, German footballer and coach.

=== 25 ===
- Robert Arden, 81, British-American film, television and radio actor.
- Katherine Lawrence, 49, American screenwriter and author, suicide by gunshot.
- Kristine Vetulani-Belfoure, 79, Polish teacher and writer, heart failure.
- Tom Wilson, 52, Scottish radio disc jockey, heart attack.

=== 26 ===
- Takeshi Kamo, 89, Japanese footballer and Olympian (1936).
- Fred Karlin, 67, American composer of feature films and television movie scores, cancer.
- Stelvio Massi, 75, Italian director, screenwriter and cinematographer.
- Bertrand de Montaudoüin, 79, French Olympic modern pentathlete (1952).
- Victor J. Nickerson, 75, American thoroughbred horse racing trainer.
- J. Edward Roush, 83, American politician (U.S. Representative for Indiana's 5th congressional district and Indiana's 4th congressional district).
- Jan Sterling, 82, American actress (The High and the Mighty, Ace in the Hole, Pony Express), stroke, diabetes.
- Colin Sutton, 65, police officer

=== 27 ===
- Bob Cremins, 98, American baseball player (Boston Red Sox).
- Peter Diamond, 74, English actor, stroke.
- Richard Lancelyn Green, 50, British scholar of Arthur Conan Doyle and Sherlock Holmes.
- Alice Haylett, 80, American baseball player.
- Frank Hrabetin, 88, American football player (Philadelphia Eagles, Brooklyn Dodgers, Miami Seahawks).
- Gerome Kamrowski, 90, American surrealist and abstract expressionist artist.
- Miriam Lichtheim, 89, Turkish-American-Israeli egyptologist.
- Jim Logan, 87, American football player (Chicago Bears).
- H. Christopher Longuet-Higgins, 80, British scholar and teacher.
- Einar Magnussen, 72, Norwegian economist and politician.
- Robert Merle, 95, French author, heart attack.
- John Sack, 74, American journalist and war correspondent, prostate cancer.
- Adán Sánchez, 19, Mexican singer, car accident.
- Larry Trask, 59, American-British linguist and expert on the Basques, amyotrophic lateral sclerosis.
- James Wapakhabulo, 59, Ugandan politician, foreign minister of Uganda.

=== 28 ===
- Percy Beames, 92, Australian sportsman and journalist.
- Albert Brülls, 67, German footballer and Olympian (1956).
- John B. Evans, 66, Welsh-American media executive
- Erich Hauser, 73, German sculptor.
- Art James, 74, American game show host and announcer.
- Ljubiša Spajić, 78, Yugoslavian football player, manager, and Olympian (1956).
- Peter Ustinov, 82, British actor (Spartacus, Topkapi, Death on the Nile), Oscar winner (1961, 1965), heart failure.

=== 29 ===
- Al Cuccinello, 89, American baseball player (New York Giants).
- Lise de Baissac, 98, Mauritian-British Special Operations Executive (SOE) agent during World War II.
- Denny Dent, 55, American speed painter, heart attack.
- Joel Feinberg, 77, American political and legal philosopher.
- Hubert Gregg, 89, British BBC broadcaster, writer and actor.
- Charles Grenzbach, 80, American sound engineer, diabetes.
- George Heard Hamilton, 93, American art historian, educator, and curator.
- Simone Renant, 93, French film actress, Alzheimer's disease.

=== 30 ===
- Salvatore Burruni, 70, Italian flyweight and bantamweight boxer, and Olympian (1956).
- Alistair Cooke, 95, British-American BBC broadcaster and commentator, cancer.
- Robert Dados, 27, Polish speedway rider, suicide.
- Erick Friedman, 64, American concert violinist and academic.
- Michael King, 58, New Zealand historian, traffic collision.
- Willy Tröger, 75, German football player, stomach cancer.
- Timi Yuro, 63, American singer-songwriter, throat cancer.

=== 31 ===
- René Gruau, 95, Italian fashion illustrator.
- Hedi Lang, 72, Swiss politician, first woman to preside over the Swiss National Council.
- Santiago Martínez, 91, Spanish Olympic equestrian (1948).
- Ivan Kostov Nikolov, 90, Bulgarian geologist, mineralogist and crystallographer.
- Sir John Paul, 88, British colonial administrator.
- Pete Pasko, 84, American basketball player.
- Haim Zafrani, 81, Scholar of Moroccan history.
