= 1954 European Athletics Championships – Men's 10,000 metres track walk =

The men's 10,000 metres track walk at the 1954 European Athletics Championships was held in Bern, Switzerland, at Stadion Neufeld.

== Medalists ==
Gold	Josef Doležal; Czechoslovakia
Silver	Anatoliy Yegorov; Soviet Union
Bronze	Sergey Lobastov; Soviet Union

== Results ==
=== Final ===
23 August

Rank	Name	Nationality	Time	Notes
1st place, gold medalist(s)	Josef Doležal	Czechoslovakia	45:01.8	CR
2nd place, silver medalist(s)	Anatoliy Yegorov	Soviet Union	45:53.0	
3rd place, bronze medalist(s)	Sergey Lobastov	Soviet Union	46:21.8	
4	Åke Rundlof	Sweden	46:48.8	
5	Bryan Hawkins	Great Britain	46:52.8	
6	Gabriel Reymond	Switzerland	47:09.8	
7	Louis Chevalier	France	47:12.0	
8	Fritz Schwab	Switzerland	47:21.6	
9	George Coleman	Great Britain	47:37.4	
10	Jindřich Malý	Czechoslovakia	48:35.8	
11	Roland Griset	France	48:38.2	
12	Ragnvald Thunestvedt	Denmark	49:00.4	
13	Gunnar Ljunggren	Sweden	49:19.6	
14	Leo Rosschou	Denmark	50:52.6	
	Claus Biethan	West Germany	DNF	
	Haralambie Racescu	Romania	DQ	

== Participation ==
According to an unofficial count, 16 athletes from 9 countries participated in the event.

- Denmark (2)
- Czechoslovakia (2)
- France (2)
- Romania (1)
- Soviet Union (2)
- Sweden (2)
- Switzerland (2)
- Great Britain (2)
- West Germany (1)
