= 1950 European Athletics Championships – Men's 10,000 metres track walk =

The men's 10,000 metres track walk at the 1950 European Athletics Championships was held in Brussels, Belgium, at Heysel Stadium.

== Medalists ==
Gold	Fritz Schwab; Switzerland
Silver	Émile Maggi; France
Bronze	John Mikaelsson; Sweden

== Results ==
=== Final ===
24 August

Rank	Name	Nationality	Time	Notes
1st place, gold medalist(s)	Fritz Schwab	Switzerland	46:01.8	CR
2nd place, silver medalist(s)	Émile Maggi	France	46:16.8	
3rd place, bronze medalist(s)	John Mikaelsson	Sweden	46:48.2	
4	Salvatore Cascino	Italy	48:46.0	
5	Louis Chevalier	France	49:03.0	
6	Robert Delannoit	Belgium	50:22.6	
7	Ragnar Olsen	Norway	51:41.8	
8	Louis van Dijck	Belgium	52:15.4	
	Ingemar Johansson	Sweden	DNF	
	Lawrence Allen	Great Britain	DQ	
	Telemaco Arcangeli	Italy	DQ	
	Roland Hardy	Great Britain	DQ	
	Louis Marquis	Switzerland	DQ	

== Participation ==
According to an unofficial count, 13 athletes from 7 countries participated in the event.

- Belgium (2)
- France (2)
- Italy (2)
- Norway (1)
- Sweden (2)
- Switzerland (2)
- Great Britain (2)
