= 1946 European Athletics Championships – Men's 10,000 metres track walk =

The men's 10,000 metres track walk at the 1946 European Athletics Championships was held in Oslo, Norway, at Bislett Stadium.

== Medalists ==
Gold	John Mikaelsson; Sweden
Silver	Fritz Schwab; Switzerland
Bronze	Émile Maggi; France

== Results ==
=== Final ===
Rank	Name	Nationality	Time	Notes
1st place, gold medalist(s)	John Mikaelsson	Sweden	46:05.2	CR
2nd place, silver medalist(s)	Fritz Schwab	Switzerland	47:03.6	
3rd place, bronze medalist(s)	Émile Maggi	France	48:10.4	
4	Louis Chevalier	France	49:37.8	
5	Egil Romberg-Andersen	Norway	49:48.0	
	Václav Balšán	Czechoslovakia	DQ	
	Kaare Hammer	Norway	DQ	
	Werner Hardmo	Sweden	DQ	

== Participation ==
According to an unofficial count, 8 athletes from 5 countries participated in the event.

- Czechoslovakia (1)
- France (2)
- Norway (2)
- Sweden (2)
- Switzerland (1)
