= Athletics at the 1948 Summer Olympics – Men's 10 kilometres walk =

Men's 10 kilometres walk at the Games of the XIV Olympiad
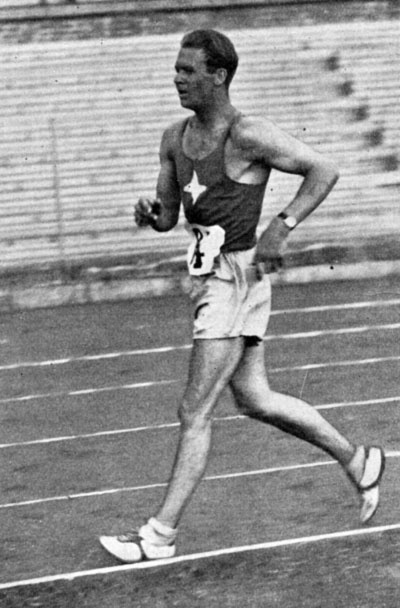
- John Mikaelsson
- Dates: 3 August 1948 (heats); 7 August 1948 (final)

Medalists
1st place, gold medalist(s)		John Mikaelsson; Sweden
2nd place, silver medalist(s)		Ingemar Johansson; Sweden
3rd place, bronze medalist(s)		Fritz Schwab; Switzerland

The men's 10 kilometres walk event at the 1948 Summer Olympic Games took place from 3 to 7 August. The final was won by Swede John Mikaelsson. This was the first time since 1924 the event took place.

== Records ==
Prior to the competition, the existing World and Olympic records were as follows.

World record	Werner Hardmo (SWE)	42:39.6	Kumla, Sweden	1945
Olympic record	George Goulding (CAN)	46:28.4	Stockholm, Sweden	11 July 1912

The following new Olympic record was set during this competition:

Date	Event	Athlete	Time	Notes
3 August	Round 1	John Mikaelsson (SWE)	45:03.0	OR

== Schedule ==
All times are British Summer Time (UTC+1)

Date	Time	Round
Tuesday 3 August 1948	10:30	Round 1
Saturday 7 August 1948	15:45	Final

== Results ==
=== Round 1 ===
Round 1 took place on 3 August. The first five competitors from each heat advanced to the final.

Heat 1

Rank	Name	Nationality	Time	Notes
1	John Mikaelsson	Sweden	45:03.0	OR
2	Jim Morris	Great Britain	45:10.4	
3	Émile Maggi	France	45:44.4	
4	Pino Dordoni	Italy	46:25.8	
5	Ingemar Johansson	Sweden	46:44.2	
6	Kaare Hammer	Norway	46:48.6	
7	George Knott	Australia		
-	Ernest Weber	United States	DSQ	
-	Kallie Reyneke	South Africa	DSQ	
-	Fred Sharaga	United States	DSQ	

Heat 2

Rank	Name	Nationality	Time	Notes
1	Harry Churcher	Great Britain	45:03.0	
2	Fritz Schwab	Switzerland	45:10.4	
3	Ronald West	Great Britain	45:44.4	
4	Gianni Corsaro	Italy	46:25.8	
5	Werner Hardmo	Sweden	46:44.2	
6	Louis Courron	France	46:48.6	
-	Henry Laskau	United States	DSQ	
-	Louis Chevalier	France	DSQ	
-	Sadhu Singh	India	DSQ	

=== Final ===
Rank	Name	Nationality	Time (hand)	Notes
1st place, gold medalist(s)	John Mikaelsson	Sweden	45:13.2	
2nd place, silver medalist(s)	Ingemar Johansson	Sweden	45:43.8	
3rd place, bronze medalist(s)	Fritz Schwab	Switzerland	46:00.2	
4	Jim Morris	Great Britain	46:04.0	
5	Harry Churcher	Great Britain	47:28.0	
6	Émile Maggi	France	47:02.8	
7	Ronald West	Great Britain		
8	Gianni Corsaro	Italy		
9	Pino Dordoni	Italy		
	Werner Hardmo	Sweden		DSQ

Key: DSQ = Disqualified
