= Athletics at the 1956 Summer Olympics – Men's 20 kilometres walk =

Men's 20 kilometre walk at the Games of the XVI Olympiad
- Competitors: 21 from 10 nations
- Winning time: 1:31:27.4

Medalists
1st place, gold medalist(s)		Leonid Spirin; Soviet Union
2nd place, silver medalist(s)		Antanas Mikėnas; Soviet Union
3rd place, bronze medalist(s)		Bruno Junk; Soviet Union

The men's 20 kilometres walk was an event at the 1956 Summer Olympics in Melbourne, Australia. There were a total number of 21 participants from 10 nations.

== Results ==
Rank	Athlete	Nation	Time	Time behind	Notes
1st place, gold medalist(s)	Leonid Spirin	Soviet Union	1:31:27.4		
2nd place, silver medalist(s)	Antanas Mikėnas	Soviet Union	1:32:03.0		
3rd place, bronze medalist(s)	Bruno Junk	Soviet Union	1:32:12.0		
4	John Ljunggren	Sweden	1:32:24.0		
5	Stan Vickers	Great Britain	1:32:34.2		
6	Don Keane	Australia	1:33:52.0		
7	George Coleman	Great Britain	1:34:01.8		
8	Roland Hardy	Great Britain	1:34:40.4		
9	Giuseppe Dordoni	Italy	1:35:00.4		
10	Ted Allsopp	Australia	1:35:43.0		
11	Abdon Pamich	Italy	1:36:03.6		
12	Henry Laskau	United States	1:38:46.8		
13	Ronald Crawford	Australia	1:39:35.0		
14	Dumitru Parachivescu	Romania	1:39:57.4		
15	Ion Barbu	Romania	1:41:37.8		
16	Bruce MacDonald	United States	1:43:25.6		
17	James Hewson	United States	1:46:24.8		
—	Josef Dolezal	Czechoslovakia	DNF		
—	Alexander Oakley	Canada	DNF		
—	Dieter Lindner	United Team of Germany	DSQ		
—	Lars Hindmar	Sweden	DSQ		
—	Gilbert Marquis	Switzerland	DNS		
—	Gabriel Reymond	Switzerland	DNS		
—	Milan Skřont	Czechoslovakia	DNS		
