= Athletics at the 1948 Summer Olympics – Men's shot put =

Men's shot put at the Games of the XIV Olympiad
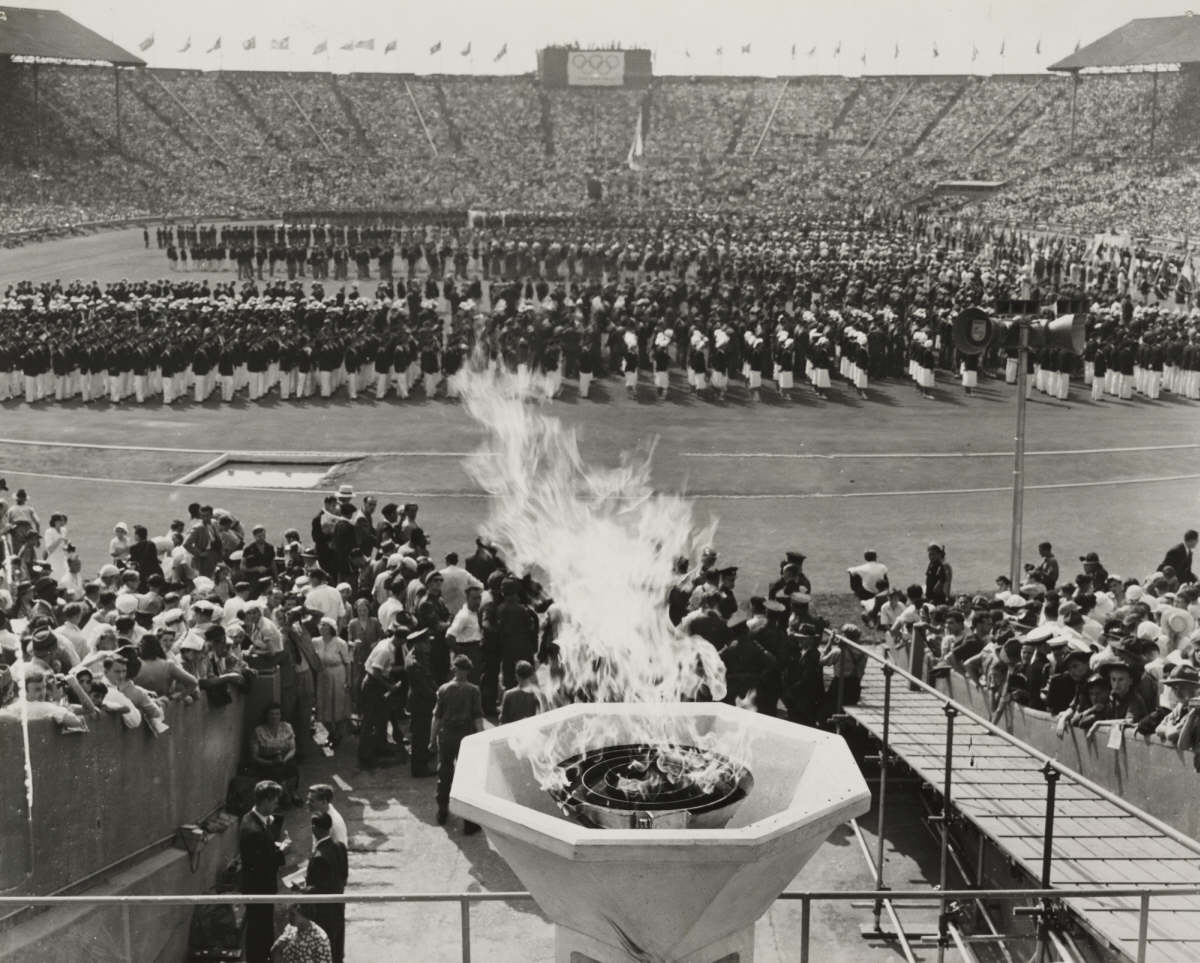
- Olympic Stadium (during opening ceremony)
- Venue: Wembley Stadium
- Dates: 3 August 1948 (qualifying and final)
- Competitors: 24 from 15 nations
- Winning distance: 17.12 OR

Medalists
1st place, gold medalist(s)		Wilbur Thompson; United States
2nd place, silver medalist(s)		Jim Delaney; United States
3rd place, bronze medalist(s)		Jim Fuchs; United States

Video on YouTube Official Video @ 37:50

The men's shot put event was part of the track and field athletics programme at the 1948 Summer Olympics. Twenty-four athletes from 15 nations competed. The maximum number of athletes per nation had been set at 3 since the 1930 Olympic Congress. The competition was held on 3 August. The final was won by American Wilbur Thompson. Thompson's compatriots, Jim Delaney and Jim Fuchs took 2nd and 3rd place. It was the ninth time that an American had won the event, and the fifth time that the Americans had swept the medals.

== Background ==
This was the 11th appearance of the event, which is one of 12 athletics events to have been held at every Summer Olympics. None of the finalists from the pre-war 1936 Games returned. The American team was strong; Charles Fonville, who had been the "best putter early in the year" and had set the world record in April, was unable to even make the three-man roster. Jim Delaney won the U.S. trials, with Wilbur Thompson the runner-up.

Canada, Iceland, Pakistan, and Peru each made their debut in the men's shot put. The United States appeared for the 11th time, the only nation to have competed in all Olympic shot put competitions to date.

== Competition format ==
The competition used the two-round format introduced in 1936, with the qualifying round completely separate from the divided final. In qualifying, each athlete received three attempts; those recording a mark of at least 14.60 metres advanced to the final. If fewer than 12 athletes achieved that distance, the top 12 would advance. The results of the qualifying round were then ignored. Finalists received three throws each, with the top six competitors receiving an additional three attempts. The best distance among those six throws counted.

== Records ==
Prior to the competition, the existing world and Olympic records were as follows.

World record	Charlie Fonville (USA)	17.68	Lawrence, United States	17 April 1948
Olympic record	Hans Woellke (GER)	16.20	Berlin, Germany	2 August 1936

Jim Fuchs broke the Olympic record with his first throw of the final, at 16.32 metres. Wilbur Thompson, later in the round, threw 16.47 metres to break the new record. In the second throw of the final, Jim Delaney achieved a new record at 16.68 metres. Later in the round, Thompson again broke this new record, putting the shot 17.12 metres. That would hold as the record through the rest of the competition. In all, the three men had 10 throws greater than the old Olympic record: all five of Thompson's legal throws, three of Fuchs's throws, and two of Delaney's. USA took a sweep of the medals.

== Schedule ==
All times are British Summer Time (UTC+1)

Date	Time	Round
Tuesday 3 August 1948	11:00; 16:00	Qualifying; Final

== Results ==
=== Qualifying round ===
Qual. rule: qualification standard 14.60m (Q) or at least best 12 qualified (q).

Rank	Athlete	Nation	Distance	Notes
1	Jim Fuchs	United States	15.870	Q
2	Wilbur Thompson	United States	15.090	Q
3	Jim Delaney	United States	14.970	Q
4	Yrjö Lehtilä	Finland	14.850	Q
5	John Giles	Great Britain	14.795	Q
6	Jaakko Jouppila	Finland	14.720	Q
7	Mieczysław Łomowski	Poland	14.700	Q
7	Gösta Arvidsson	Sweden	14.700	Q
9	Konstantinos Giataganas	Greece	14.630	Q
10	Čestmír Kalina	Czechoslovakia	14.540	q
11	Sigfús Sigurðsson	Iceland	14.480	q
12	Witold Gerutto	Poland	14.450	q
13	Willy Senn	Switzerland	14.450	
14	Roland Nilsson	Sweden	14.360	
15	Eric Coy	Canada	14.150	
16	David Guiney	Ireland	14.010	
17	Vilhjálmur Vilmundarson	Iceland	13.990	
18	Roger Verhaes	Belgium	13.540	
19	Harold Moody	Great Britain	13.400	
20–24	Emilio Malchiodi	Argentina	Unknown	
20–24	Juan Kanhert	Argentina	Unknown	
20–24	Lionelo Patiño	Peru	Unknown	
20–24	Nazar Muhammad Khan Malik	Pakistan	Unknown	
20–24	Ahmed Zahur Khan	Pakistan	Unknown	
—	Aad de Bruyn	Netherlands	DNS	
—	Eduardo Julve	Peru	DNS	
—	François Lapicque	France	DNS	
—	K. Meraklis	Greece	DNS	
—	Leo Roininen	Canada	DNS	
—	José Luis Torres	Spain	DNS	

=== Final ===
Rank	Athlete	Nation	1	2	3	4	5	6	Distance	Notes
1st place, gold medalist(s)	Wilbur Thompson	United States	16.47 OR	17.12 OR	16.97	16.67	16.80	X	17.12	OR
2nd place, silver medalist(s)	Jim Delaney	United States	16.14	16.68 OR	15.88	16.03	16.03	16.28	16.68	
3rd place, bronze medalist(s)	Jim Fuchs	United States	16.32 OR	16.42	15.60	15.56	14.82	16.28	16.42	
4	Mieczysław Łomowski	Poland	Unknown						15.43	
5	Gösta Arvidsson	Sweden	Unknown						15.37	
6	Yrjö Lehtilä	Finland	Unknown						15.05	
7	Jaakko Jouppila	Finland	Unknown						14.59	
8	Čestmír Kalina	Czechoslovakia	Unknown						14.55	
9	Konstantinos Giataganas	Greece	Unknown						14.54	
10	Witold Gerutto	Poland	Unknown						14.37	
11	John Giles	Great Britain	Unknown						13.73	
12	Sigfús Sigurðsson	Iceland	Unknown						13.66	
