= 1946 European Athletics Championships – Men's shot put =

Men's shot put at the European Athletics Championships

The men's shot put at the 1946 European Athletics Championships was held in Oslo, Norway, at Bislett Stadion on 23 August 1946. Although the existence of this event is up for debate.

== Medalists ==
Gold	Gunnar Huseby; Iceland
Silver	Dmitriy Goryainov; Soviet Union
Bronze	Yrjö Lehtilä; Finland

== Results ==
=== Final ===
23 August

Rank	Name	Nationality	Result	Notes
1st place, gold medalist(s)	Gunnar Huseby	Iceland	15.56	
2nd place, silver medalist(s)	Dmitriy Goryainov	Soviet Union	15.25	
3rd place, bronze medalist(s)	Yrjö Lehtilä	Finland	15.23	
4	Roland Nilsson	Sweden	15.16	
5	Thage Pettersson	Sweden	14.87	
6	Sulo Bärlund	Finland	14.75	
7	Eivind Sværen	Norway	14.34	
8	Lars Ulgenes	Norway	14.28	
9	Witold Gerutto	Poland	13.90	

=== Qualification ===
23 August

Rank	Name	Nationality	Result	Notes
1	Gunnar Huseby	Iceland	15.64	Q
2	Thage Pettersson	Sweden	14.72	Q
3	Yrjö Lehtilä	Finland	14.50	Q
4	Witold Gerutto	Poland	14.49	Q
5	Eivind Sværen	Norway	14.33	Q
6	Dmitriy Goryainov	Soviet Union	14.32	Q
7	Roland Nilsson	Sweden	14.20	Q
8	Sulo Bärlund	Finland	14.11	Q
9	Lars Ulgenes	Norway	14.02	Q
10	Čestmír Kalina	Czechoslovakia	13.60	
11	Dave Guiney	Ireland	13.57	
12	Roger Verhas	Belgium	12.77	
13	Mieczysław Łomowski	Poland	12.53	

== Participation ==
According to an unofficial count, 13 athletes from 9 countries participated in the event.

- Belgium (1)
- Czechoslovakia (1)
- Finland (2)
- Iceland (1)
- Ireland (1)
- Norway (2)
- Poland (2)
- Soviet Union (1)
- Sweden (2)
