= Ronald West =

British racewalker

Personal information
- Nationality: British (English)
- Born: 27 April 1914
- Died: 22 October 1992 (aged 78) Rainham, England

Sport
- Sport: Athletics
- Event: Racewalking

Ronald Albert West (27 April 1914 – 22 October 1992) was a British racewalker who competed at the 1948 Summer Olympics.

== Biography ==
West was a draughtsman by trade and started racewalking in 1938 but had his career interrupted by World War II. He was a member of the Cambridge Harriers of Bexleyheath, London and was appointed the club secretary after the war.

West finished third behind Harry Churcher and Jim Morris in both the 2 miles walk event and the 7 miles walk event at the 1948 AAA Championships.

Shortly after the AAAs, he represented the Great Britain team at the 1948 Olympic Games in London, where he competed in the men's 10 kilometres walk and qualified for the final, finishing 7th.

West continued walking and finished third at the 50 km Walking British Championship at Enfield (a trial event for the 1956 Summer Olympics).
