= 1947 AAA Championships =

Outdoor track and field competition

- Dates: 18–19 July 1947
- Host city: London, England
- Venue: White City Stadium
- Level: Senior
- Type: Outdoor

The 1947 AAA Championships was the 1947 edition of the annual outdoor track and field competition organised by the Amateur Athletic Association (AAA). It was held from 18 to 19 July 1947 at White City Stadium in London, England.

== Summary ==
The Championships covered two days of competition. The marathon and decathlon events were held in Loughborough during August.

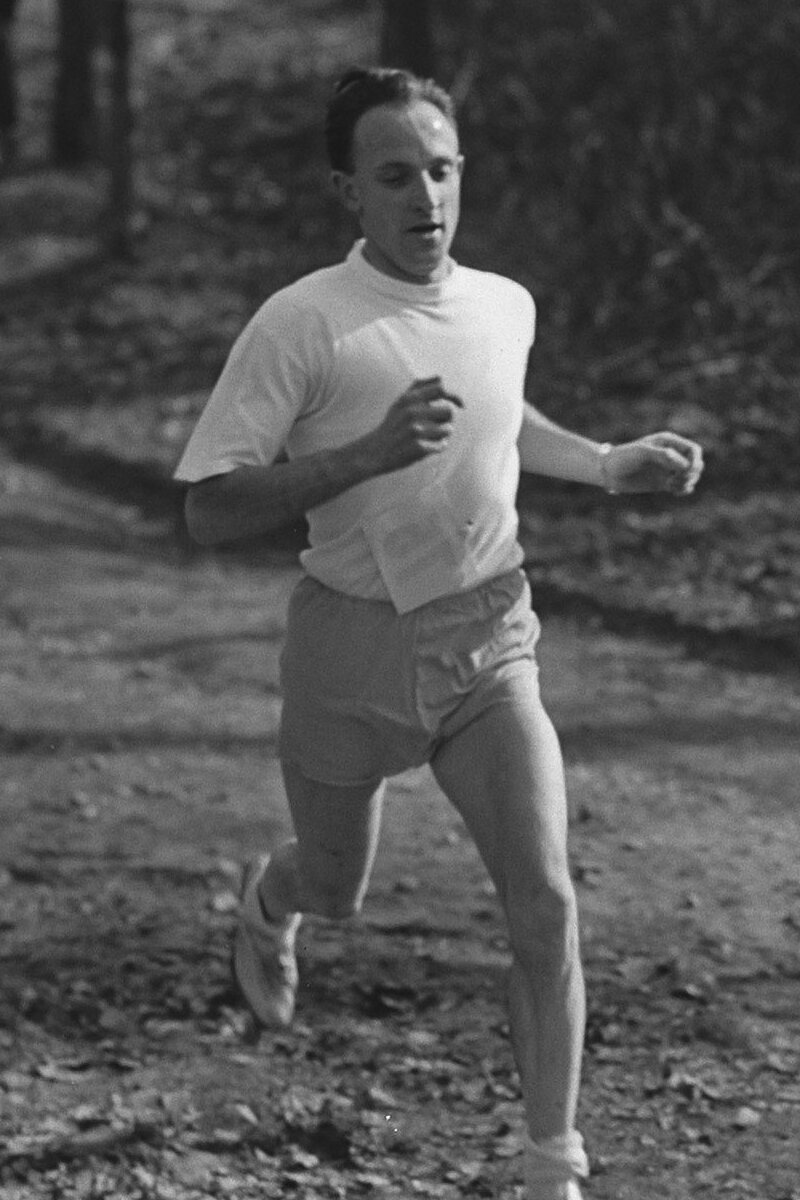
Jef Lataster won the 3 miles race

== Results ==
Event	Gold		Silver		Bronze	
100 yards	McDonald Bailey	9.7	John Wilkinson	10.0	Jack Gregory	10.0
220 yards	McDonald Bailey	21.7	John Fairgrieve	5 yd	Reg Toone	3 yd
440 yards	(Republic of Ireland) Jim Reardon	48.3	(South Africa) Peter Wallis	6 yds	(Switzerland) Oskar Hardmeier	1 yd
880 yards	Tom White	1:53.8	(Netherlands) Frits de Ruijter	1:53.9	John Parlett	1:54.0
1 mile	(Hungary) Sándor Garay	4:10.6	(Netherlands) Willem Slijkhuis	4:12.2	Bill Nankeville	4:18.8
3 miles	(Netherlands) Jef Lataster	14:20.0	Alec Olney	14:23.2	George Lucas	14:30
6 miles	Anthony Chivers	30:31.4	Jim Peters	30:49.0	Charlie Smart	30:51.0
10 miles	Jim Peters	53:21.0	Reginald Draper	53:58.0	Richard Towndrow	55:46.0
marathon	Jack Holden	2:33:20.2	(Wales) Tom Richards	2:36:07	(Scotland) Donald Robertson	2:37:45.6
steeplechase	(Hungary) Híres László	10:39.3	(Belgium) Robert Everaert	30 yd	Albert Robertson	30 yd
120y hurdles	(Belgium) Pol Braekman	14.9	Don Finlay	inches	(Netherlands) Jan Zwaan	1 yd
440y hurdles	Harry Whittle	55.0	(Switzerland) Werner Christen	4 yd	Ronald Ede	8 yds
2 miles walk	(Sweden) Lars Hindmar	13:54.4	Harry Churcher	13:56.0	(Italy) Giuseppe Kressevich	14:09.6
7 miles walk	Harry Churcher	52:48.4	(Italy) Mario Di Salvo	53:13.8	(Italy) Giuseppe Kressevich	54:17.6
high jump	Adegboyega Adedoyin	1.930	Ron Pavitt	1.905	Desmond V. Nicholson	1.854
pole vault	(Hungary) Zoltan Zsitvay	3.81	(Netherlands) Cor Lamoree	3.81	(Denmark) Hans Moesgaard-Kjeldsen	3.58
long jump	Harry Whittle	7.25	Adegboyega Adedoyin	7.22	Harry Askew	7.21
triple jump	Denis Watts	14.25	(Australia) Anthony Lethbridge	14.01	Robert Hawkey	13.57
shot put	(Republic of Ireland) David Guiney	14.48	(Netherlands) Aad de Bruyn	13.49	Harold Moody	13.31
discus throw	(Netherlands) Jan Brasser	43.76	(Northern Ireland) James Nesbitt	42.58	Jack Brewer	42.38
hammer throw	(Hungary) Imre Németh	53.34	(Poland) Jerzy Kordas	51.98	(Scotland) Duncan Clark	49.61
javelin throw	(Latvia) Jan Stendzenieks	64.20	(Netherlands) Nico Lutkeveld	58.26	(Denmark) Hans Moesgaard-Kjeldsen	56.04
decathlon	(Denmark) Hans Moesgaard-Kjeldsen	5965	Harry Whittle	5650 NR	Norman Dear	4962
Tug of war (catchweight)	Wimpey London Airport A		Wimpey London Airport B			
Tug of war (100st)	Wimpey London Airport A		Fords			

== See also ==
- 1947 WAAA Championships
