= Harold Moody (athlete) =

British shot putter (1915–1986)

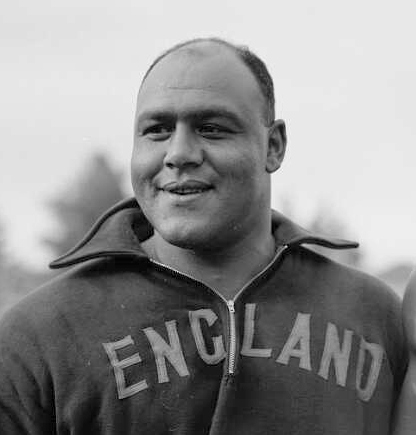
- Moody at the 1950 British Empire Games

Personal information
- Nationality: British/New Zealander
- Born: 1 November 1915 Camberwell, London, England
- Died: 12 September 1986 (aged 70) Auckland, New Zealand
- Occupation: Medical practitioner

Sport
- Sport: Athletics
- Event: Shot put
- Club: South London Harriers

Achievements and titles
- Personal best: 14.32 m (1950)
Medal record
Representing England
1950 British Empire Games
Silver medal – second place	1950 Auckland	Shot put

Harold Ernest Arundel Moody (1 November 1915 – 12 September 1986) was a British shot putter.

== Biography ==
Moody joined the South London Harriers in 1946 and quickly made his mark, earning his first international honours for GB v France when he won the shot put event. Moody finished third behind Aad de Bruyn in the shot put event at the 1946 AAA Championships and third behind David Guiney at the 1947 AAA Championships.

After a second place finish behind Guiney at the 1948 AAA Championships Moody represented the Great Britain team at the 1948 Olympic Games in London, where he competed at the shot put competition.

The AAA title continued to elude Moody as he was placed second again at the 1949 AAA Championships, this time behind John Giles. However, he did experience success, when he represented the England athletics team at the 1950 British Empire Games in Auckland, New Zealand and won a silver medal.

On route to Auckland on the ship Tamaroa, Moody acted as the medical officer to the British party and after the Games Moody decided that he wanted to emigrate to New Zealand. He duly emigrated and joined the Lynndale AA & HC, where he continued to compete for several years, winning the NZ Shot in 1952/53 and Discus in 1953.

In 1957, Moody became a naturalised New Zealand citizen. He served as borough mayor of Glen Eden in Auckland from 1965 to 1971. Harold Moody Reserve, a popular Glen Eden sports park and home ground for the Glenora Bears rugby league team, bears his name.

Moody died on 12 September 1986, and his ashes were buried in Waikumete Cemetery, Auckland.

== Bibliography ==
- Vela, Pauline, ed. (1989). In Those Days: An Oral History of Glen Eden. Glen Eden Borough Council. ISBN 0-473-00862-9.
