= Lawrence Allen (race walker) =

British racewalker

Personal information
- Nationality: British (English)
- Born: 25 April 1921 Sheffield, England
- Died: 16 December 2018 (aged 97) Sheffield, England

Sport
- Sport: Athletics
- Event: race walking
- Club: Sheffield United Harriers

Lawrence Allen also known as Lol Allen (25 April 1921 – 16 December 2018) was a British racewalker who competed at the 1952 Summer Olympics.

== Biography ==
Allen was born in Sheffield, England and competed at club level for Sheffield United Harriers. In 1948 he won the national junior 10-mile title.

Allen finished third behind Arne Börjesson in the 2 miles walk event and second behind Harry Churcher in the 7 miles walk event at the 1949 AAA Championships. From 1950 until 1952 he finished runner-up in three consecutive AAA Championships behind Roland Hardy.

Allen finished second at the 1950 European Athletics Championships but was denied a medal after being disqualified in the 10,000 metres event and was disqualified again while representing the Great Britain team at the 1952 Olympic Games in Helsinki.

A steel forge worker by trade, he died in December 2018 at the age of 97.
