= Sigfús Sigurðsson =

Sigfús Sigurðsson may refer to:

- Sigfús Sigurðsson (athlete) (1922–1999), Olympic shot putter from Iceland
- Sigfús Sigurðsson (handballer) (born 1975), Olympic handball player from Iceland
