= Louis Chevalier =

Louis Chevalier may refer to:

- Louis Chevalier (historian) (1911–2001), French historian
- Louis Chevalier (racewalker) (1921–2006), French racewalker
