= Allah Ditta =

Allah Ditta may refer to:

- Allah Ditta (racewalker) (born 1931), Pakistani racewalker
- Allah Ditta (pole vaulter) (1932–2020), Pakistani pole vaulter
- Allah Ditta (wrestler) (born 1947), Pakistani wrestler
- Allah Ditta (hurdler) (born 1977), Pakistani hurdler
