= Ernest Weber =

Ernest Weber may refer to:

- Ernest Weber (footballer) (1877–1945), French footballer and sports journalist
- Ernest Weber (race walker) (1908–1950), American race walker
