= 10,000 metres race walk =

Racewalking distance event

Athletics 10,000 metres walk

World records
- Men: Eiki Takahashi (JPN) 37:25.21 (2020)
- Women: Nadezhda Ryashkina (URS) 41:56.23 (1990)

The 10,000 metres race walk is a racewalking event. The event is competed as a track race. Athletes must always keep in contact with the ground and the supporting leg must remain straight until the raised leg passes it. 10,000 meters is 6.21 miles.

== History ==
This distance is not commonly raced at senior competitions but part of junior and youth championships. Top level senior athletics racewalking events typically feature 10 km road distance.

== World bests ==
On November 14, 2020, Eiki Takahashi of Japan set a new 10,000 m race walk world best in Inzai in a time of 37:25.21. The all-time women's 10,000 m race-walk record is held by Nadezhda Ryashkina of the Soviet Union, at 41:56.23.

== All-time top 25 (outdoor) ==
=== Men ===
- Correct as of August 2026.

Rank	Result	Athlete	Nationality	Date	Place	Ref.
1	37:23.99	Gabriel Bordier	France	2 August 2025	Talence	
2	37:25.21	Eiki Takahashi	Japan	14 November 2020	Inzai	
3	37:25.90	Koki Ikeda	Japan	14 November 2020	Inzai	
4	37:35.00	Yuta Koga	Japan	14 November 2020	Inzai	
5	37:47.39	Sergey Kozhevnikov	Russia	19 June 2026	Saransk	
6	37:53.09	Paquillo Fernández	Spain	27 July 2008	Santa Cruz de Tenerife	
7	37:57.02	Perseus Karlström	Sweden	26 June 2022	Dublin	
8	37:58.08	Daisuke Matsunaga	Japan	7 July 2018	Kitami	
9	37:58.6 h	Ivano Brugnetti	Italy	23 July 2005	Sesto San Giovanni	
10	38:02.60	Jozef Pribilinec	Slovakia	30 August 1985	Banská Bystrica	
11	38:02.68	Isaac Beacroft	Australia	11 December 2025	Sydney	
12	38:03.78	Declan Tingay	Australia	2 February 2023	Canberra	
13	38:04.09 A	Misgana Wakuma	Ethiopia	28 March 2026	Addis Ababa	
14	38:06.28	Miguel Ángel López	Spain	24 July 2016	Gijón	
15	38:06.6 h	David Smith	Australia	25 September 1986	Sydney	
16	38:08.13	Yohann Diniz	France	12 July 2014	Reims	
17	38:08.50	Evan Dunfee	Canada	27 January 2025	Canberra	
18	38:10.23	Yusuke Suzuki	Japan	16 July 2015	Abashiri	
19	38:12.13	Ronald Weigel	East Germany	11 May 1986	Potsdam	
20	38:14.24	Vasiliy Mizinov	Russia	2 August 2022	Chelyabinsk	
21	38:18.0 h	Valdas Kazlauskas	USSR Lithuania	18 September 1983	Moscow	
22	38:20.0 h	Moacir Zimmermann	Brazil	7 June 2008	Blumenau	
23	38:23.52	Paul McGrath	Spain	24 July 2026	Málaga	
24	38:23.73 (Note: different sources listed time both as indoor and outdoor mark, actually outdoor)	Wang Zhen	China	8 February 2015	Genova	
25	38:23.95	Ryo Hamanishi	Japan	14 November 2020	Inzai	

==== Notes ====
Below is a list of other times equal or superior to 38:23.95:

- Perseus Karlström also walked 38:03.95 (2019).
- Paquillo Fernández also walked 38:07.65 (2007).
- Daisuke Matsunaga also walked 38:16.76 (2016).
- Eiki Takahashi also walked 38:01.49 (2015), 38:18.51 (2014), 38:21.88 (2016).
- David Smith also walked 38:20.9 (1985).
- Declan Tingay also walked 38:23.06 (2025).
- Ivano Brugnetti also walked 38:23.5 (2004).

=== Women ===
- Correct as of August 2026.

Rank	Result	Athlete	Nationality	Date	Place	Ref.
1	40:59.93	Elvira Chepareva	Russia	15 August 2024	Yekaterinburg	
2	41:11.48	Reykhan Kagramanova	Russia	15 August 2024	Yekaterinburg	
3	41:37.9 h (Note: not ratified by IAAF)	Gao Hongmiao	China	7 April 1994	Beijing	
4	41:42.5 h	Lyudmyla Olyanovska	Ukraine	1 November 2014	Mukachevo	
5	41:56.23	Nadezhda Ryashkina	Soviet Union	24 July 1990	Seattle	
6	41:57.22	Kerry Saxby-Junna	Australia	24 July 1990	Seattle	
7	41:57.29	Antonella Palmisano	Italy	23 April 2017	Orvieto	
8	42:02.99	Sandra Arenas	Colombia	25 August 2018	Trujillo	
9	42:11.5 h	Beate Gummelt	Germany	5 May 1992	Fana	
10	42:12.93	María Pérez	Spain	25 July 2026	Málaga	
11	42:13.7 h	Madelein Svensson	Sweden	5 May 1992	Fana	
12	42:14.12	Raquel González	Spain	23 July 2016	Gijón	
13	42:15.68	Elizabeth McMillen	Australia	11 December 2025	Sydney	
14	42:19.2 h	Gu Yan	China	7 April 1994	Beijing	
15	42:23.37	Julia Takács	Spain	27 July 2014	Alcobendas	
16	42:23.7 h	Ileana Salvador	Italy	8 May 1993	Fana	
17	42:30.31	Olimpiada Ivanova	Russia	26 July 1994	Sankt Petersburg	
18	42:34.30	Jemima Montag	Australia	6 August 2022	Birmingham	
19	42:35.69	Beatriz Pascual	Spain	23 July 2016	Gijón	
20	42:37.0 h	Sari Essayah	Finland	8 May 1993	Fana	
21	42:38.24	Liu Hongyu	China	24 October 1995	Nanjing	
22	42:40.37	Feng Haixia	China	24 October 1995	Nanjing	
23	42:43.23	Yelena Sayko	Russia	26 July 1994	Sankt Peterburg	
24	42:45.0 h	Elisabetta Perrone	Italy	30 May 1999	Catania	
25	42:46.7 h	Cui Yingzi	China	15 March 1992	Jinan	
25	42:46.7 h	Chen Yueling	China	15 March 1992	Jinan	

==== Notes ====
Below is a list of other times equal or superior to 42:30.13:

- Elvira Chepareva also walked 41:45.84 (2019).
- Kerry Saxby-Junna also walked hand-timed 42:22.6 (1993), 42:23.9 (1992), 42:25.2 (1990), automatic-timed 42:26.29 (1993), and hand-timed 42:27.5 (1995).
- Beate Gummelt also walked hand-timed 42:29.4 (1990), 38:21.88 (2016).
- Gao Hongmiao also walked 42:30.13 (1995).

== All-time top 25 (indoor) ==
=== Men ===
- Correct as of 30 September 2026. (Note: This source lists the 8 February 2015 race with 38:23.73 by Wang Zhen and 39:15.91 by Cai Zelin as indoor results, but Villa Gentile is a regular outdoor track.)

Rank	Result	Athlete	Nationality	Date	Place	Ref.
1	38:31.4 h	Werner Heyer	East Germany	12 January 1980	Berlin	
2	38:35.5 h	Ronald Weigel	Germany	12 January 1980	Berlin	
3	38:46.0 h	Reima Salonen	Finland	9 March 1988	Turku	
4	38:54.4 h	Frants Kostyukevich	Belarus	3 February 1996	Minsk	
5	39:06.06	Igor Glavan	Ukraine	24 December 2014	Sumy	
6	39:10.6 h	Mikhail Khmelnitskiy	Belarus	4 February 1995	Minsk	
7	39:13.15	Hartwig Gauder	Germany	26 February 1988	Senftenberg	
8	39:14.0 h	Pyotr Pochenchuk	Belarus	6 February 1983	Moscow	
9	39:20.52	Nazar Kovalenko	Ukraine	20 February 2010	Sumy	
10	39:20.8	Viktor Semyonov	Russia	17 February 1980	Moscow	
11	39:21.0 h	Vladimir Andreyev	Russia	21 January 1997	Moscow	
12	39:21.6 h	Nikolay Matveyev	Belarus	2 March 1981	Minsk	
13	39:22.0 h	Aleksey Voyevodin	Russia	28 December 2001	Penza	
14	39:23.55	Mikita Kaliada	Belarus	20 February 2026	Mogilyov	
15	39:26.79	Ivan Trotskiy	Belarus	22 February 2008	Mogilyov	
16	39:27.5 h	Artur Meleshkevich	Belarus	3 February 1996	Minsk	
17	39:30.5 h	Mikhail Orlov	Russia	24 January 1995	Moscow	
18	39:32.0 h	Igor Plotnikov	Russia	4 March 1988	Minsk	
18	39:32.0 h	Aleksey Kronin	Russia	21 January 1997	Moscow	
20	39:34.0 h	Roland Wieser	East Germany	11 January 1984	Potsdam	
21	39:34.6 h	Aivars Rumbenieks	Lithuania	17 February 1980	Moscow	
22	39:38.6 h	Valdas Kazlauskas	Lithuania	17 February 1980	Moscow	
23	39:39.0 h	Ralf Kowalsky	East Germany	11 January 1984	Potsdam	
24	39:40.97	Aliaksandr Liakhovich	Belarus	18 February 2017	Mogilyov	
25	39:42.19	Sergey Chernov	Belarus	22 February 2008	Mogilyov	

==== Notes ====
Below is a list of other times equal or superior to 39:42.00:

- Ronald Weigel also walked 38:51.04 (1988).
- Mikhail Khmelnitskiy also walked 39:18.72 (1993) and hand-timed 39:40.6 (1996).
- Frants Kostyukevich also walked hand-timed 39:26.2 (1997), 39:28.0 (1988), and 39:34.0 (1995).
- Vladimir Andreyev also walked hand-timed 39:27.0 (1995).
- Pyotr Pochenchuk also walked hand-timed 39:29.0 (1984).

=== Women ===
Rank	Result	Athlete	Nationality	Date	Place	Ref.
1	43:13.00	Viktoriya Bartash	Belarus	14 February 2025	Mogilev	
2	43:49.69	Alina Yushchanka	Belarus	20 February 2026	Mogilev	
3	43:54.63	Yelena Ginko	Belarus	22 February 2008	Mogilev	
4						
5						
6	44:11.8 h	Beate Gummelt	Germany	2 February 1992	Berlin	
7	44:38.8 h	Olimpiada Ivanova	Russia	21 January 2001	Moscow	
8						
9						
10						
11						
12						
13	45:14.71	Alesia Savaneuskaya	Belarus	14 February 2025	Mogilev	
14						
15						
16	46:23.01	Lizaveta Hryshkavich	Belarus	14 February 2025	Mogilev	
17						
18						
19						
20	47:22.21	Palina Astapuk	Belarus	14 February 2025	Mogilev	
21						
22						
23						
24						
25	48:20.86	Veranika Kliashniak	Belarus	20 February 2026	Mogilev	

==== Notes ====
Below is a list of other times equal or superior to 46:33.74:

- Yelena Ginko also walked 45:40.38 (2006)
- Viktoriya Bartash also walked 44:39.55 (2018).
- Alesia Savaneuskaya also walked 45:40.38 (2026).
- Lizaveta Hryshkavich also walked 46:33.74 (2026).

== Medalists ==
=== European Athletics Championships ===
Games	Gold	Silver	Bronze
1946 Oslo	John Mikaelsson (SWE)	Fritz Schwab (SUI)	Émile Maggi (FRA)
1950 Brussels	Fritz Schwab (SUI)	Émile Maggi (FRA)	John Mikaelsson (SWE)
1954 Berne	Josef Doležal (TCH)	Anatoliy Yegorov (URS)	Sergey Lobastov (URS)
