= 1948 AAA Championships =

Outdoor track and field competition

- Dates: 2–3 July 1948
- Host city: London, England
- Venue: White City Stadium
- Level: Senior
- Type: Outdoor

The 1948 AAA Championships was the 1948 edition of the annual outdoor track and field competition organised by the Amateur Athletic Association (AAA). It was held from 2 to 3 July 1948 at White City Stadium in London, England.

== Summary ==
The Championships covered two days of competition. The marathon was held from Windsor to Chiswick and the decathlon event was held in Chiswick.

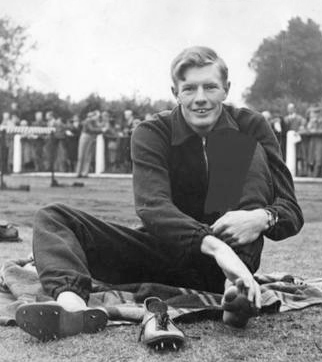
High jump winner John Winter

== Results ==
Event	Gold		Silver		Bronze	
100 yards	(Australia) John Treloar	9.8	(Scotland) Alastair McCorquodale	1 yd	McDonald Bailey	2ft
220 yards	(Scotland) Alastair McCorquodale	22.2	John Fairgrieve	2 yd	(Australia) John Bartram	1 yd
440 yards	(Australia) Morris Curotta	48.2	(Republic of Ireland) Jim Reardon	48.6	Bill Roberts	48.8
880 yards	John Parlett	1:52.2	(New Zealand) Doug Harris	1:52.5	Arthur Wint	1:54.0
1 mile	Bill Nankeville	4:14.2	(Luxembourg) Josy Barthel	4:15.4	(Netherlands) Frits de Ruijter	4:16.0
3 miles	(Netherlands) Wim Slijkhuis	14:07.0	Alec Olney	14:15.4	Bill Lucas	14:21
6 miles	Stan Cox	30:08.4	Jim Peters	30:16.0	(Northern Ireland) Steven McCooke	30:27.6
marathon	Jack Holden	2:36:44.6	(Wales) Tom Richards	2:38:03	Stan Jones	2:40:49
steeplechase	Peter Curry	10:31.8	Geoffrey Tudor	10:34.8	Rene Howell	10:37.8
120y hurdles	Joe Birrell	15.1	(Australia) Peter Gardner	1 yd	(Australia) Charles Green	1 yd
440y hurdles	Harry Whittle	54.9	(New Zealand) John Holland	1 yd	(Switzerland) Werner Christen	8 yds
2 miles walk	Harry Churcher	13:49.0	Jim Morris	13:57.0	Ronald West	14:27.0
7 miles walk	Harry Churcher	52:23.0	Jim Morris	53:14.0	Ronald West	53:23.0
high jump	(Australia) John Winter	1.930	(Scotland) Alan Paterson	1.880	Adegboyega Adedoyin	1.880
pole vault	Richard Webster	3.73	James Redpath	3.58	Tim Anderson	3.50
long jump	(Australia) Bill Bruce	7.25	Adegboyega Adedoyin	7.00	Sylvanus Williams	7.00
triple jump	(Australia) George Avery	14.15	(Scotland) Allan Lindsay	14.02	Sidney Cross	13.76
shot put	(Republic of Ireland) David Guiney	14.41	Harold Moody	14.18	John Giles	13.89
discus throw	(Republic of Ireland) Cummin Clancy	42.21	Jack Brewer	41.97	Laurence Reavell-Carter	41.95
hammer throw	Norman Drake	49.24	(Scotland) Duncan Clark	47.54	(Scotland) Ewan Douglas	46.42
javelin throw	(Latvia) Jan Stendzenieks	66.68	Malcolm Dalrymple	57.39	Morville Chote	57.02
decathlon	(Denmark) Hans Moesgaard-Kjeldsen	5794	(Switzerland) Hans Wyss	5673	(India) Baldev Singh	5599

== See also ==
- 1948 WAAA Championships
