= Mikėnas =

- Lithuanian surname
- m.: Mikėnas
- f.: (unmarried): Mikėnaitė
- f.: (married): Mikėnienė

Mikėnas is a Lithuanian language family name. It may refer to:

- Vladas Mikėnas (1910–1992), Lithuanian chessmaster
- Antanas Mikėnas (1924–1994), Lithuanian athlete
- Juozas Mikėnas (1901–1964), Lithianian sculptor
