= 1949 AAA Championships =

Outdoor track and field competition

- Dates: 15–16 July 1949
- Host city: London, England
- Venue: White City Stadium
- Level: Senior
- Type: Outdoor

The 1949 AAA Championships was the 1949 edition of the annual outdoor track and field competition organised by the Amateur Athletic Association (AAA). It was held from 15 to 16 July 1949 at White City Stadium in London, England.

== Summary ==
The Championships covered two days of competition. The marathon was held in Birmingham and the decathlon event was held in Sandhurst.

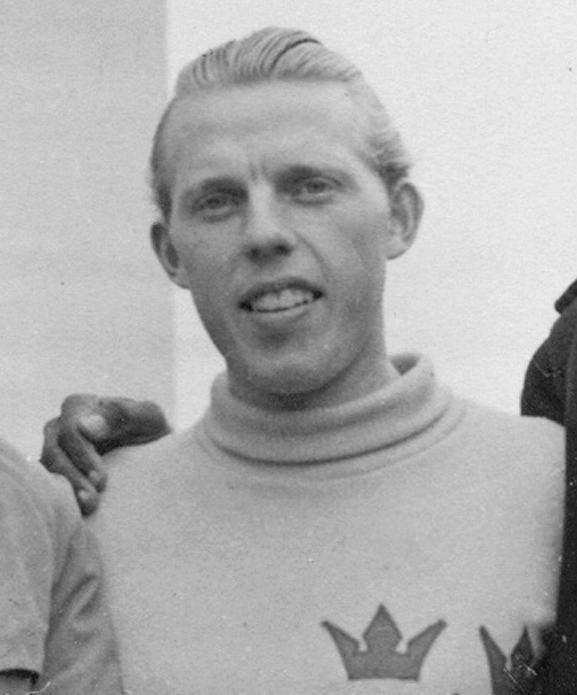
Arne Börjesson

== Results ==
Event	Gold		Silver		Bronze	
100 yards	McDonald Bailey	9.7	Leslie Laing	9.8	Jack Archer	9.9
220 yards	McDonald Bailey	21.7	Leslie Laing	22.2	(Wales) Ken Jones	22.2
440 yards	Derek Pugh	48.5	Leslie Lewis	49.1	Terry Higgins	49.3
880 yards	John Parlett	1:53.7	Tom White	1:53.7	Roy Morley	1:54.3
1 mile	Bill Nankeville	4:08.8	Dick Morris	4;11.8	Len Eyre	4:12.8
3 miles	(Republic of Ireland) John Joe Barry	14;11.0	Anthony Chivers	14:12.6	Alec Olney	14;30.2
6 miles	(Estonia) Valdu Lillakas	30:15.0	Stan Cox	30:16.4	Walter Hesketh	30:19.2
marathon	Jack Holden	2:34:10.6	(Wales) Tom Richards	2:38:08	Cecil Ballard	2:38:42
steeplechase	Trevor Holt	10:29.0	David Ross	10:31.6	Peter Curry	10:37.8
120y hurdles	Don Finlay	14.6	(Scotland) John Hart	15.2	Joe Birrell	15.3
440y hurdles	Harry Whittle	54.9	Ronald Ede	56.4	Gervais Jarvis	56.7
2 miles walk	(Sweden) Arne Börjesson	14:06.6	Harry Churcher	14:09.6	Lol Allen	
7 miles walk	Harry Churcher	52:41.8	Jim Morris	53:04.0	Lol Allen	54:31.0
high jump	(Scotland) Alan Paterson	1.930	Ron Pavitt	1.930	Peter Wells	1.930
pole vault	(United States) Peter Harwood	3.81	(Hungary) Tamás Homonnay	3.81	Tim Anderson	3.66
long jump	Harry Whittle	7.15	(Nigeria) Sylvanus Williams	7.01	Harry Askew	6.95
triple jump	(Netherlands) Henk van Egmond	14.32	(Australia) Louis Davies	14.30	Sidney Cross	14.14
shot put	John Giles	14.13	Harold Moody	13.81	John Savidge	13.73
discus throw	(Hungary) Ferenc Klics	47.67	(Republic of Ireland) Cummin Clancy	43.83	(Latvia) Andrej Jankovskis	43.38
hammer throw	(Hungary) Imre Németh	55.61	(Hungary) Lajos Petike	50.21	(Scotland) Duncan Clark	49.50
javelin throw	Antony Hignell	56.33	Malcolm Dalrymple	54.06	Alan Redgate	52.50
decathlon	(Denmark) Hans Moesgaard-Kjeldsen	6138	Harry Whittle	5997 NR	Les Pinder	5628

== See also ==
- 1949 WAAA Championships
