= Thage =

Thage is a masculine given name. Notable people with the name include:

- Thage Brauer (1894–1988), Swedish Olympic high jumper
- Thage G. Peterson (born 1933), Swedish politician and speaker of the Riksdag
- Thage Pettersson (1922–2009), Swedish shot putter

== See also ==
- Tage
