= Donald Keane =

Australian racewalker

Donald Michael Keane (12 November 1930 – 10 November 2016) was an Australian racewalker who competed in the 1952 Summer Olympics, ranking 10th in the men's 10K walk, and in the 1956 Summer Olympics, ranking 6th in the men's 20K walk.
