= Mieczysław Łomowski =

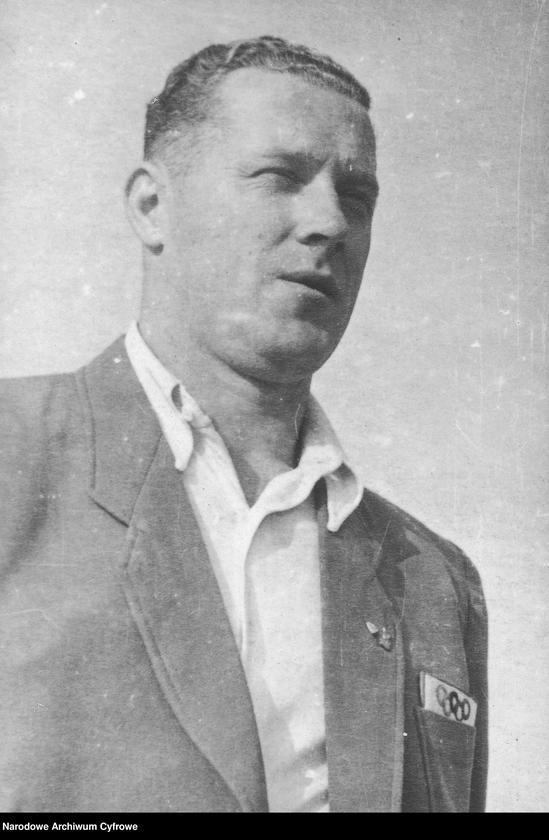
- Łomowski in 1948

Personal information
- Nickname: Żubr
- Nationality: Polish
- Born: 19 September 1914 Vilna, Russian Empire (modern-day Lithuania)
- Died: 15 October 1969 (aged 55) Gniew, Poland
- Height: 1.81 m (5 ft 11 in)
- Weight: 94 kg (207 lb)

Sport
- Event: Shot put
- Club: KPW Ognisko; Śmigły Vilnius; AZS Vilnius; BOP Gdańsk(1945); Lechia Gdańsk (1946–1949); Budowlani Gdańsk (1950–1951); Gwardia Gdańsk (1952–1956); Wybrzeże Gdańsk (1957–1958)

Mieczysław Łomowski (19 September 1914, in Vilna – 15 October 1969, near Gniew) was a Polish shot putter who competed in the 1948 Summer Olympics finishing fourth. He was also his country's flagbearer at these Olympics. He was set to compete at the 1952 Summer Olympics in Helsinki but was ruled out due to an injury.

He died in a car accident near Gniew.

== International competitions ==
Year	Competition	Venue	Position	Event	Notes
Representing Poland
1946	European Championships	Oslo, Norway	13th (q)	Shot put	12.53 m
1948	Olympic Games	London, United Kingdom	4th	Shot put	15.43 m

== Personal bests ==
- Shot put – 16.25 (Poznań 1955)
- Discus throw – 48.77 (Gdańsk 1955)

Olympic Games
Preceded by Klemens Biniakowski	Flagbearer for Poland; 1948 London	Succeeded by Teodor Kocerka
