= Bruno Fait =

Italian racewalker

Personal information
- Nationality: Italian
- Born: 7 July 1924 Trento, Italy
- Died: 18 May 2000 (aged 75)

Sport
- Country: Italy
- Sport: Athletics
- Event: Racewalking

Bruno Fait (7 July 1924 – 18 May 2000) was an Italian racewalker who competed in the 1952 Summer Olympics.

After his sport career he emigrated to France and became a writer.

== Achievements ==
Year	Competition	Venue	Position	Event	Performance	Note
1952	Olympic Games	(Finland) Helsinki	8th	10 km walk	46:25.6	
