= Wilbur Thompson =

American track and field athlete

- Thompson at the 1948 Olympics

Personal information
- Born: April 6, 1921 Frankfort, South Dakota, U.S.
- Died: December 25, 2013 (aged 92) Long Beach, California, U.S.
- Education: University of Southern California.
- Height: 183 cm (6 ft 0 in)
- Weight: 89 kg (196 lb)

Sport
- Sport: Athletics
- Events: Shot put, discus throw
- Club: ILAAC, Los Angeles

Achievements and titles
- Personal bests: SP – 17.12 m (1948); DT – 46.89 m (1942)
Medal record
Representing the United States
Olympic Games
Gold medal – first place	1948 London	Shot put

Wilbur Marvin "Moose" Thompson (April 6, 1921 – December 25, 2013) was an American shot putter who won a gold medal at the 1948 Summer Olympics, leading an American sweep of the medals.

While studying at Modesto Junior College, Thompson won the national junior college title in 1939 and 1940. He then served in the US Army during World War II, and in 1946 placed second at the NCAA championships while at USC. He held a world ranking of #6 in 1947, #2 in 1948, #3 in 1949 and #4 in 1950. Thompson graduated with a master's degree in petroleum engineering and later worked in the oil production and at the California State Lands Commission. He died aged 92.

His grandson, McLeod Bethel-Thompson, is a professional quarterback in the CFL.
