= Lionelo Patiño =

Peruvian shot putter

Personal information
- Nationality: Peruvian
- Born: 1 June 1920
- Died: 4 June 1987 (aged 67)

Sport
- Sport: Athletics
- Event: Shot put

Lionelo Patiño (1 June 1920 – 4 June 1987) was a Peruvian athlete. He competed in the men's shot put at the 1948 Summer Olympics.
