= Louis Courron =

French racewalker

Personal information
- Nationality: French
- Born: 9 April 1914
- Died: 21 November 1983 (aged 69)

Sport
- Sport: Athletics
- Event: Racewalking

Louis Courron (9 April 1914 – 21 November 1983) was a French racewalker. He competed in the men's 10 kilometres walk at the 1948 Summer Olympics.
