= John Giles (athlete) =

British shot putter (1927–2024)

Personal information
- Nationality: British (English)
- Born: 9 February 1927 Edmonton, London, England
- Died: 7 April 2024 (aged 97)

Sport
- Sport: Athletics
- Event: shot put
- Club: Southgate Harriers

John Alfred Giles (9 February 1927 – 7 April 2024) was a British shotputter who competed in the 1948 Summer Olympics and in the 1952 Summer Olympics.

== Biography ==
Giles was born in Edmonton, London and was a member of Southgate Harriers.

Giles finished third behind David Guiney in the shot put event at the 1948 AAA Championships. Shortly afterwards he represented the Great Britain team at the 1948 Olympic Games in London, where he participated in the shot put competition. He qualified in fifth place to make the Olympic final.

In 1949 he won the Southern title and claimed honours at the Kinnaird Trophy meeting but his big achievement that year was becoming the British shot put champion after winning the British AAA Championships title at the 1949 AAA Championships.

Giles died on 7 April 2024, at the age of 97.
