= Ion Barbu (athlete) =

Romanian racewalker

Personal information
- Nationality: Romanian
- Born: 12 June 1930

Sport
- Sport: Athletics
- Event: Racewalking

Ion Barbu (born 12 June 1930) is a Romanian racewalker. He competed in the men's 20 kilometres walk at the 1956 Summer Olympics.
