= Oskar Hardmeier =

Swiss sprinter (born 1925)

Personal information
- Nationality: Swiss
- Born: 21 August 1925
- Died: before 2003
- Height: 168 cm (5 ft 6 in)
- Weight: 62 kg (137 lb)

Sport
- Sport: Sprinting
- Event: 400 metres
- Club: LC Zürich

Oskar Hardmeier (21 August 1925 – before 2003) was a Swiss sprinter. He competed in the men's 400 metres at the 1948 Summer Olympics.

Hardmeier finished third behind Jim Reardon in the 440 yards event at the 1947 AAA Championships.
