= Jim Delaney (shot putter) =

American shot putter (1921–2012)

Personal information
- Full name: Francis James Delaney
- Born: March 1, 1921 Butte, Montana, U.S.
- Died: April 2, 2012 (aged 91) Santa Rosa, California, U.S.
- Height: 6 ft 0 in (183 cm)
- Weight: 205 lb (93 kg)
Medal record
Men's athletics
Representing the United States
Olympic Games
Silver medal – second place	1948 London	Shot put

Francis James Delaney (March 1, 1921 – April 2, 2012) was an American athlete who competed mainly in the shot put.

He graduated from Sacred Heart High School in 1939 and was considered the country's top shot putter at the time.

Delaney was a three-time All-American in the shot put for the Notre Dame Fighting Irish track and field team. He competed for the United States in the 1948 Summer Olympics held in London, Great Britain in the shot put where he won the silver medal.
