= Bruno Junk =

Estonian race walker

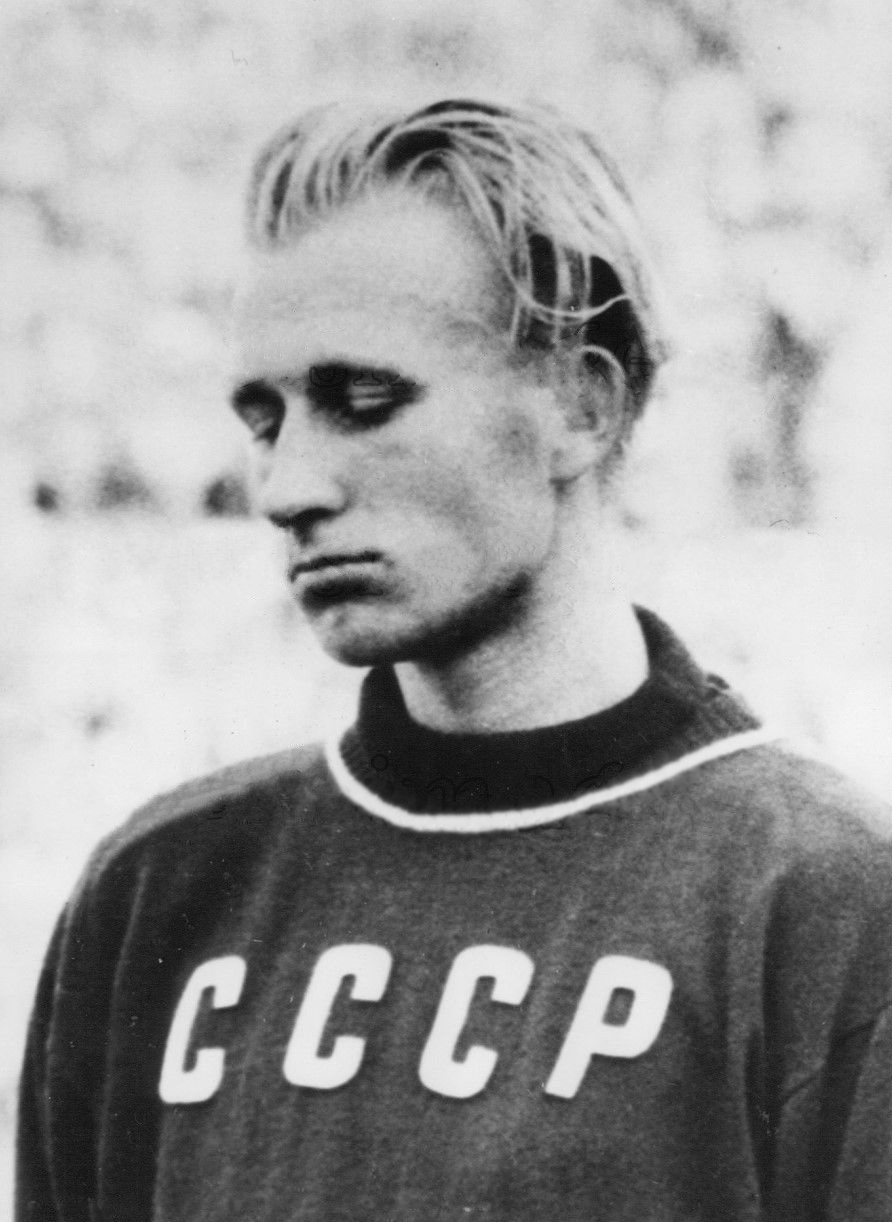
- Junk in 1952

Personal information
- Born: 27 September 1929 Valga, Estonia
- Died: 22 September 1995 (aged 65) Tartu, Estonia
- Height: 185 cm (6 ft 1 in)
- Weight: 72 kg (159 lb)

Sport
- Sport: Athletics
- Event: Race walking
- Club: Dynamo Moscow; Dünamo Tallinn

Achievements and titles
- Personal bests: 10 km – 42:20.6 (1958); 20 km – 1:28:05 (1956)
Medal record
Representing the Soviet Union
Olympic Games
Bronze medal – third place	1952 Helsinki	10 km
Bronze medal – third place	1956 Melbourne	20 km

Bruno Junk (27 September 1929 – 22 September 1995) was an Estonian race walker. He competed for the Soviet Union at the 1952 and 1956 Olympics and won bronze medals on both occasions. He set a world record in the 15 km in 1951 (1:08:08.0), and had world's best times in the 20 km in 1956 (1:30:00.8) and in the 3 km in 1952 (11:51.4). Domestically he won four Soviet titles: in 1951 and 1956 in the 20 km, and in 1952 and 1953 in the 10 km, and eight Estonian titles: in 1949–50 and 1956–59 in the 20 km, in 1958 in the 10 km, and in 1959 in the 30 km.

Junk took up race walking in 1948 and retired in 1959. He later worked as an athletics coach at Dünamo Tallinn club, serving as its vice-president from 1976–1979. He was also vice-president (1964–1970) and then president (1979–1987) of the Estonian Athletics Federation. In parallel, Junk worked for the Estonian Ministry of Internal Affairs and wrote for the Estonian sports periodicals Kehakultuur and Spordileht. Since 1996, an annual memorial race walking tournament has been held in his honour in his birth town of Valga. There is a street named after him in Puka, Estonia, a borough near Valga.
