= Roger Verhaes =

Belgian athletics competitor

Personal information
- Nationality: Belgian
- Born: 8 May 1920
- Died: 1 May 1999 (aged 78)

Sport
- Sport: Athletics
- Events: Shot put Discus

Roger Verhaes (8 May 1920 – 1 May 1999) was a Belgian athlete. He competed in the men's shot put and the men's discus throw at the 1948 Summer Olympics.
