= Vilhjálmur Vilmundarson =

Icelandic athlete (1929–2020)

Personal information
- Nationality: Icelandic
- Born: 17 April 1929
- Died: 30 March 2020 (aged 90) Reykjavík, Iceland

Sport
- Sport: Athletics
- Event: Shot put

Vilhjálmur Vilmundarson (17 April 1929 – 30 March 2020) was an Icelandic athlete. He competed in the men's shot put at the 1948 Summer Olympics.

He was the father of sprinter Vilmundur Vilhjálmsson.
