= Kallie Reyneke =

South African racewalker

Personal information
- Full name: Jacobus Karel Christoffel "Kallie" Reyneke
- Nationality: South African
- Born: 8 February 1922
- Died: 15 September 2009 (aged 87)

Sport
- Sport: Athletics
- Event: Racewalking

Jacobus Karel Christoffel "Kallie" Reyneke (8 February 1922 – 15 September 2009) was a South African racewalker. He competed in the men's 10 kilometres walk at the 1948 Summer Olympics.
