= Klemens Biniakowski =

Polish sprinter

Personal information
- Nationality: Polish
- Born: 15 November 1902 Nakel, German Empire
- Died: 6 March 1985 (aged 82)

Sport
- Sport: Sprinting
- Event: 400 metres

Klemens Biniakowski (15 November 1902 – 6 March 1985) was a Polish sprinter. He competed in the men's 400 metres at the 1928 Summer Olympics. Biniakowski was the flag-bearer for Poland at the opening ceremony of the 1936 Berlin Olympics.

Olympic Games
Preceded by Janusz Ślązak	Flagbearer for Poland; 1936 Berlin	Succeeded by Mieczysław Łomowski
