= Jim Morris (racewalker) =

British racewalker

Personal information
- Nationality: British (English)
- Born: 2 January 1915 Brentford, England
- Died: 1985 (aged 69–70) Southampton, England

Sport
- Sport: Athletics
- Event: Racewalking
- Club: Surrey Athletics Club

Achievements and titles
- Personal best: 10 km walk: 45:10.4 (1948)

Caleb James Morris (2 January 1915 – 1985) was a British racewalker who competed at the 1948 Summer Olympics.

== Biography ==
Morris finished second behind Harry Churcher in both the 2 miles walk event and the 7 miles walk event at the 1948 AAA Championships. He did however win the 10 km Olympic trial.

Shortly after the AAAs, he represented the Great Britain team at the 1948 Olympic Games in London, where he competed in the men's 10 kilometres walk and qualified for the final, finishing 4th, just outside the medal positions.

Morris would finish second again behind Churcher at the 1949 AAA Championships.
