= Werner Hardmo =

Swedish racewalker

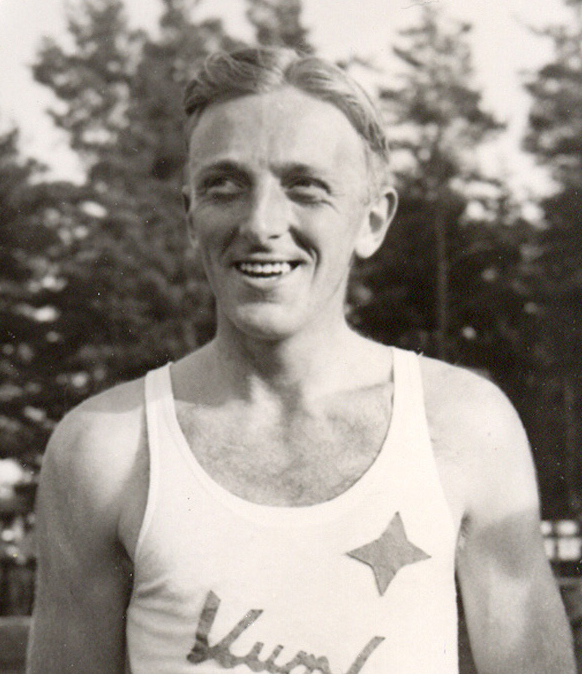

Personal information
- Born: 25 March 1917 Hardmo, Kumla, Sweden
- Died: 16 September 2010 (aged 93) Kumla, Sweden
- Height: 176 cm (5 ft 9 in)
- Weight: 70 kg (154 lb)

Sport
- Sport: Athletics
- Event: Race walking
- Club: IFK Kumla

Achievements and titles
- Personal best: 10 kmW – 42:31.6 (1964)

Werner Gustaf Hilmer Hardmo (25 March 1917 – 16 September 2010) was a Swedish race walker. He was born as Werner Pettersson, but in 1943 changed his last name to Hardmo after his birthplace. During World War II, he set 22 official world records in race walking over distances between 3000 m and 10 miles. Between 1942 and 1945, he won 91 consecutive races, mostly in Sweden. He was disqualified in the 10 km races at the 1946 European Championships and 1948 Summer Olympics. He retired shortly thereafter and ran his grocery store in Kumla.
