= Yrjö Lehtilä =

Finnish shot putter

Medal record

Men's athletics

Representing Finland

European Championships
| Bronze medal – third place | 1946 Oslo | Shot put |

Yrjö Ilmari Lehtilä (19 November 1916 in Turku – 27 March 2000) was a Finnish shot putter who competed in the 1948 Summer Olympics.
