= Thage Pettersson =

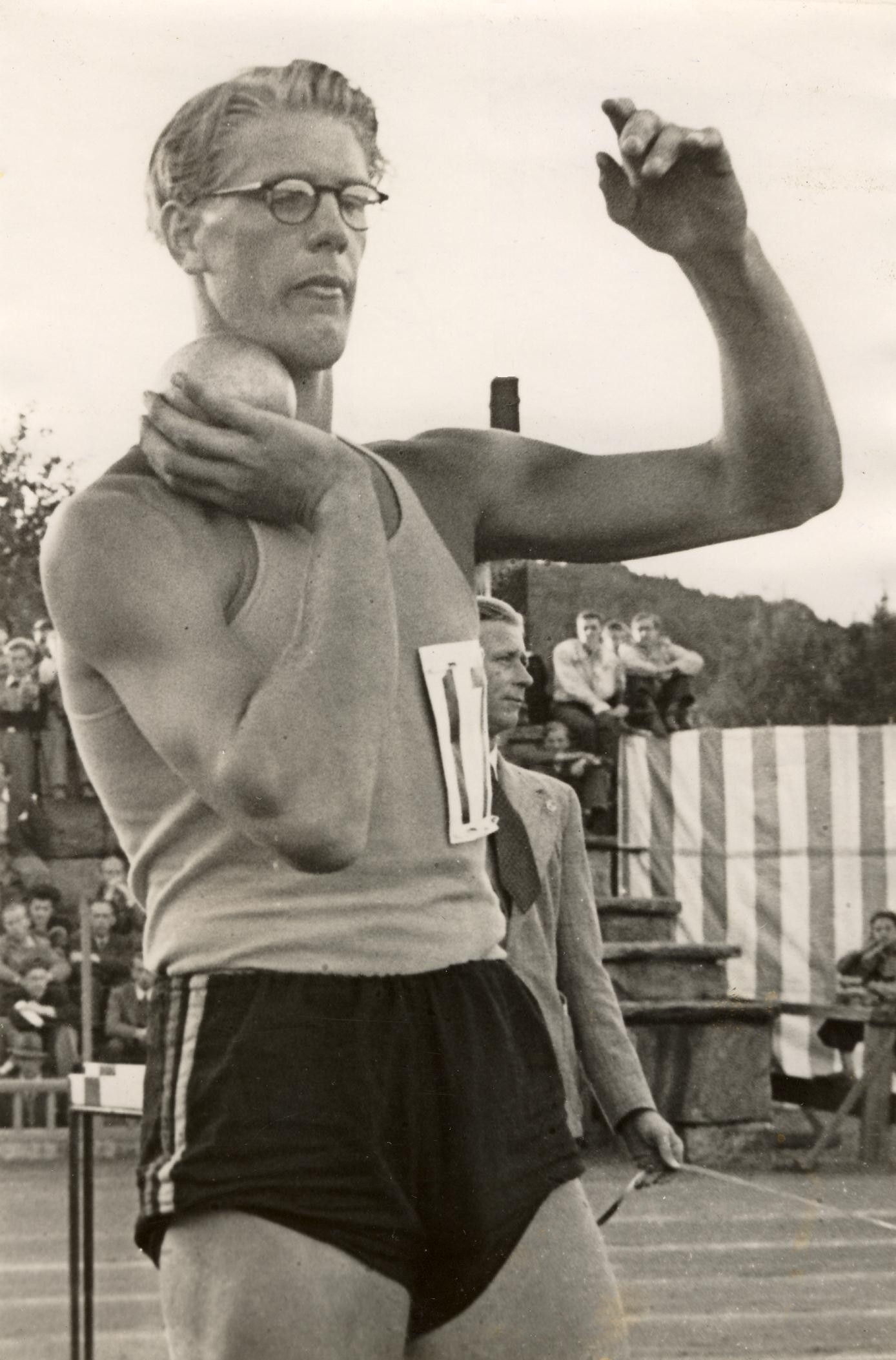

Personal information
- Born: 15 April 1922 Söne, Sweden
- Died: 2009 (aged 86–87)

Sport
- Sport: Athletics
- Event: Shot put
- Club: Lidköpings IS

Achievements and titles
- Personal best: 15.55 (1946)

Thage Pettersson (later Sönegård, 15 April 1922 – 2009) was a Swedish shot putter who won the national title in 1953. He placed fifth in this event at the 1946 European Championships.

Pettersson grew up on a farm in Söne. He was initially selected for the 1948 Olympics, but then the Swedish Olympic team was reduced in numbers. In 1969 he founded an electricity company and ran it until retirement.
