= Ingemar Johansson (race walker) =

Swedish racewalker (1924–2009)

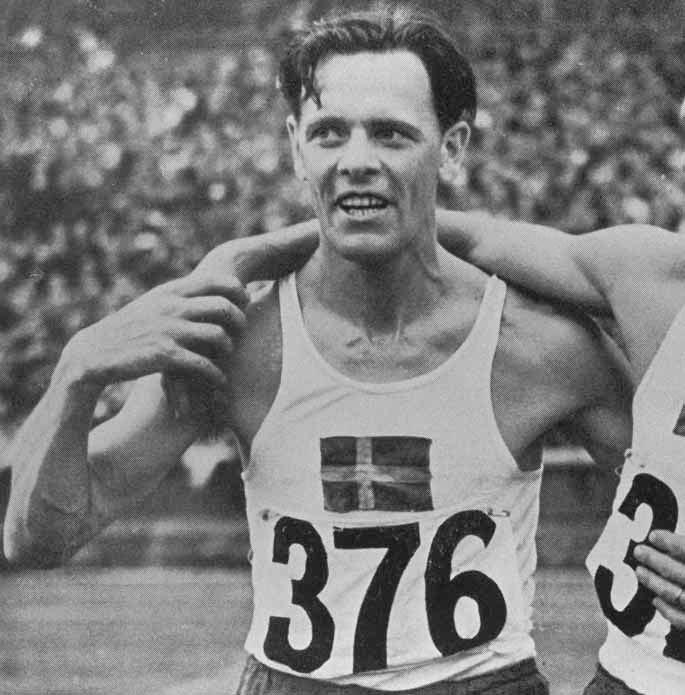

Personal information
- Born: 25 April 1924 Uddeholm, Sweden
- Died: 18 April 2009 (aged 84) Värmskog, Sweden

Sport
- Sport: Athletics
- Event: 10 km walk
- Club: Arvika IS

Achievements and titles
- Personal best: 45:00.0 (1947)
Medal record
Representing Sweden
Olympic Games
Silver medal – second place	1948 London	10 km walk

Bror Ingemar Ture Johansson (25 April 1924 – 18 April 2009) was a Swedish race walker who won a silver medal in the 10 km at the 1948 Summer Olympics. He was also an accomplished speed skater.
