= Sergey Lobastov =

Soviet racewalker

Personal information
- Nationality: Soviet
- Born: 5 April 1926 Ufa, Bashkir A.S.S.R, U.S.S.R
- Died: 1999 (aged 72–73) Moscow, Russia

Sport
- Sport: Athletics
- Event: Racewalking
Medal record
Men's athletics
Representing Soviet Union
European Championships
Bronze medal – third place	1954 Bern	10 km walk

Sergey Lobastov (5 April 1926 – 1999) was a Soviet racewalker. He competed in the men's 50 kilometres walk at the 1952 Summer Olympics.
