= Jaakko Jouppila =

Finnish shot putter (1923–1950)

Pentti Jaakko Jouppila (16 September 1923 – 15 December 1950) was a Finnish shot putter who competed in the 1948 Summer Olympics. He committed suicide by gunshot in 1950 after fatally shooting his wife at Seinäjoki train station.

== Biography ==
He was born on 16 September 1923 in the Finnish city of Seinäjoki. He would go on to become a shot putter, competing in the 1948 Summer Olympics held in England following the Second World War. On 15 December 1950, he committed suicide while in his hometown of Seinäjoki.
