= Ivan Yarmysh =

Soviet-Ukrainian racewalker

Ivan Yarmysh (15 February 1925 – 3 April 1990) was a Ukrainian racewalker who competed for the Soviet Union in the 1952 Summer Olympics.
