= Jean-François Ravelinghien =

French swimmer

Personal information
- Born: 15 September 1947 Tourcoing, France
- Died: 21 March 2004 (aged 56) Avrainville, France

Sport
- Sport: Swimming

Jean-François Ravelinghien (15 September 1947 – 21 March 2004) was a French freestyle swimmer. He competed in two events at the 1968 Summer Olympics.
