= Douglas Lima (water polo) =

Brazilian water polo player

Personal information
- Born: 31 March 1932 Manaus, Brazil
- Died: 1 March 2004 (aged 71)

Sport
- Sport: Water polo

Douglas Lima (31 March 1932 – 1 March 2004) was a Brazilian water polo player. He competed in the men's tournament at the 1952 Summer Olympics.
