= Pedro Pablo Sará =

Spanish footballer (1924–2004)

Personal information
- Full name: Pedro Pablo Sará Giordano
- Date of birth: 14 March 1924
- Place of birth: Córdoba, Argentina
- Date of death: 23 March 2004 (aged 80)
- Place of death: Oviedo, Spain
- Position: Midfielder

Senior career*
Years	Team	Apps	(Gls)
- Concepción Unidos (Villa Concepción del Tío)
- Brinkmann CF
- RC Avellaneda
- Sportivo Belgrano
–1949	San Lorenzo de Almagro		
1949–1955	Real Oviedo		
1955–1957	Real Murcia		
1957–1959	Real Jaén		
1959–1961	Alcoyano		
Total		89	(32)

Managerial career
- 1965–1966: Alcoyano
- * Club domestic league appearances and goals

Pedro Pablo Sará Giordano (14 March 1924 – 23 March 2004), was an Argentine footballer who played as a midfielder for Real Oviedo and Real Murcia in the 1950s.

== Playing career ==
Born on 14 March 1924 in Córdoba, Argentina, Sará spent most of the 1940s playing for several teams in his homeland, such as Concepción, Brinkmann CF, RC Avellaneda, Sportivo Belgrano, and San Lorenzo de Almagro, from which he joined Real Oviedo in 1949, aged 24. Together with Antonio Durán, Miguel González, and fellow South American Ricardo Salaberry, he was one of the most used forwards by coach Luis Urquiri during Oviedo's triumphant campaign at the 1951–52 Segunda División.

Noted for his powerful shot and resourceful range of movement, Sará stayed at Oviedo for six years, from 1949 until 1955, scoring a total of 68 goals in 119 official matches. In 1955, he signed for Real Murcia, with whom he played two seasons, until 1957, when he went to Real Jaén, where he also played for two seasons, until 1959. He then played his last football at Alcoyano, where he retired in 1961, aged 37. In total, he scored 32 goals in 89 La Liga matches for Oviedo, Murcia, and Jaén.

== Managerial career ==
A few years after retiring, Sará briefly coached Alcoyano, overseeing 8 league matches in the 1965–66 season. He also coached several Argentine clubs.

== Later life and death ==
Having returned to Oviedo in 1999, Sará became the first director of the municipal football school of the Real Oviedo Veterans Association, which awarded him its gold and diamond badge on 14 February 2004. The following month, on 23 March 2004, the 80-year-old Sará died in Oviedo. His ashes were scattered on the field of the new Estadio Carlos Tartiere, just as he had wished.

== Honours ==
Real Oviedo

- Segunda División:
  - Champions (1): 1951–52
