= Lars Ulgenes =

Norwegian shot putter

Lars Teodor Ulgenes (27 January 1918 – 21 March 2005) was a Norwegian shot putter. He represented the club Odda IL. He finished eighth at the 1946 European Championships with a throw of 14.28 metres (46.9 ft). He never participated in the Summer Olympics. He became Norwegian champion in 1949.

His career best throw was 14.89 metres (48.9 ft), achieved in August 1948 in Bergen.

Ulgenes died in March 2005 at the age of 87.
