= Čestmír Kalina =

Czech shot putter

Personal information
- Nationality: Czech
- Born: 5 May 1922
- Died: 18 October 1988 (aged 66)

Sport
- Sport: Athletics
- Event: Shot put

Čestmír Kalina (5 May 1922 – 18 October 1988) was a Czech athlete. He competed in the men's shot put at the 1948 Summer Olympics.
