= Václav Balšán =

Czech racewalker

Václav Balšán (19 November 1914 – 18 November 1972) was a Czechoslovak racewalker (of the AC Sparta Prague and Spartak Nusle Club) who established the 1945 world record of 42 minutes and 31 seconds in a 10,000 metres race. He was the champion on this distance at Czechoslovak Athletics Championships in 1945, 1946, 1948 and 1949. He also won the silver medal in 1954.
