= Allah Ditta (race walker) =

Pakistani racewalker (born 1931)

Personal information
- Full name: Allah Ditta
- Nationality: Pakistan
- Born: 21 May 1931

Sport
- Country: Pakistan
- Sport: Athletics
- Event: Racewalking

Allah Ditta (born 21 May 1931) is a Pakistani former racewalker. He competed in the 10 km walk at the 1952 Summer Olympics where he was disqualified in the heats.
