= Costas Montis =

Cypriot poet

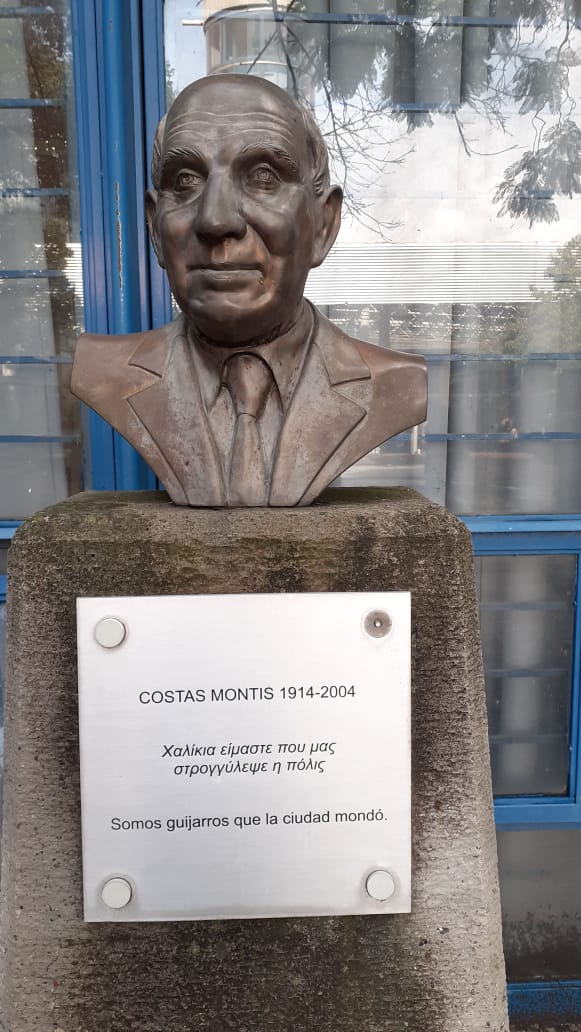
- Costas Montis effigy
- Born: 18 February 1914; Famagusta, British Cyprus
- Died: 1 March 2004 (aged 90); Nicosia, Cyprus
- Occupation(s): poet, novelist, playwright

Costas Montis (Greek: Κώστας Μόντης; 18 February 1914 – 1 March 2004) was an influential and prolific Cypriot poet, novelist, and playwright.

== Biography ==
Costas Montis was born on 18 February 1914 in Famagusta, the sixth and last child of Theodoulos Montis from Lapithos, and Kalomoira Batista, who was descended from an old Venetian family of Famagusta. His youth was scarred by a series of family tragedies. In 1922 his 21-year-old brother George died of tuberculosis, and his brother Nikos died even younger, at the age of 16, of leukaemia. His mother also died of tuberculosis in 1926, and she was followed four years later by her husband, who died of cancer.

After graduating from the Pancyprian Gymnasium, Costas Montis studied law at the University of Athens, but in 1937 on his return to Cyprus (then under British rule) he could not work as a lawyer because his degree was Greek. Instead he got a job in 1938 in the Accounting Office of the Greek Mining Company in Nicosia. Within a month he was transferred to the mines of Mitsero as supervisor of the company offices there, and the following month to the mines of Kalavasos again as supervisor. A year later he was promoted to assistant manager at the company offices in Nicosia. At the same time he worked as a correspondent for the newspaper Eleftheria.

In 1940 the mines were closed because of the Second World War, and Costas Montis worked as a teacher at a school of accounting in Morphou.

In 1942 Costas Montis got engaged to his sweetheart, 19-year-old Ersi, daughter of Pantelis Constantinou and Maria Gabrielidou from Morphou. In the same year he moved to Nicosia and founded, with Achilleas Lymbourides and Phivos Moussoulides, Cyprus's first professional theatre, the Lyriko. The theatre closed down in 1944, and Montis returned to the school of accounting in Morphou, until in 1946 he was appointed senior editor of The Cyprus Chamber of Commerce Journal. At the same time he published, until 1947, the independent newspaper Free Voice (Ελεύθερη Φωνή). He married Ersi in 1946, and they had four children: Theodoulos, Marios, Lellos, and Stalo.

In 1948 he was appointed editor at the newspaper Ethnos. Then in 1950 he became Secretary General of the Chamber of Commerce of Cyprus. From 1953 he published the Cyprus Trade Journal, in both Greek and English, and from 1956 until 1969, he was in charge of the literary section of the magazine Times of Cyprus. After Cyprus became independent he was appointed Head of Tourism (1961). He remained in this position until his retirement in 1976. He died on 1 March 2004 in his home in Nicosia.

During the campaign for independence in the 50s, Costas Montis participated in the struggle "as political guide of the members of EOKA in Nicosia".

== Honours and awards ==
He received numerous honours and awards including honorary doctorates from the University of Cyprus and the University of Athens. He was nominated for the Nobel Prize in 1984, and was appointed a Corresponding Member of the Academy of Athens, the highest honour the Academy can confer on non-citizen Greeks. In support of his nomination to the Academy of Athens, Professor Nicholas Konomis stated that:

With his uninterrupted literary creation of 70 years, he has been able to depict artistically the authentic rhythms, the temperature, and the action of the deepest historical and emotional fluctuations of the soul and breath of Cyprus and her people. In his extremely powerful work he has recorded every vibration of the island (erotic, social, political), and all the thoughts of the people of Cyprus have been set down... He has made use of the whole wealth of the linguistic, historical, and cultural tradition of greater Hellenism, and entrenched in his work, with unprecedented poetic force, the indelible character of the deep-rooted values of the Greek nation.

In 1980 he was awarded the title of Poet Laureate by the World Academy of Arts and Culture.

On 5 January 1995 he was given the Government of Cyprus’ Award for Excellence in Letters and the Arts. In her speech the Minister of Education and Culture, Claire Angelidou, said of him: "Costas Montis is not simply a great Cypriot poet. He is the leading, living Greek poet."

In 2004 the President of Cyprus Tassos Papadopoulos unveiled a bust of Costas Montis in Nicosia close to Eleftheria Square.

His books have been translated into English, French, German, Italian, Dutch, Swedish, and Russian.

== Books ==
Prose

- Camels And Other Short Stories (Γκαμήλες και άλλα διηγήματα), 1939.
- Humble Life (Ταπεινή ζωή), short stories, 1944.
- Short Stories (Διηγήματα), 1970.
- Closed Doors (Κλειστές πόρτες), novella; 1st ed. 1964; 2nd ed. 2008; ISBN 978-0-9773769-8-8.
- Afentis Batistas and The Other Things (Ο αφέντης Μπατίστας και τ' άλλα), novel; 1st ed. 1980; 2nd ed. 2008; ISBN 978-0-9773769-6-4.

Poetry

- With Metre and Without Metre (Με μέτρο και χωρίς μέτρο), 1934.
- Minima, 1946.
- The Songs of Humble Life (Τα τραγούδια της ταπεινής ζωής), 1954.
- Moments (Στιγμές), 1958.
- Addendum to Moments (Συμπλήρωμα των Στιγμών), 1960.
- Poetry of Costas Montis (Ποίηση του Κώστα Μόντη), 1962.
- Letter To Mother and Other Verses (Γράμμα στη μητέρα και άλλοι στίχοι), 1965.
- To the Unknown Man (Αγνώστω ανθρώπω), 1968.
- From the Beloved Cyprus (Εξ ιμερτής Κύπρου), 1969.
- In Nicosia, On... (Εν Λευκωσία τη…), 1970.
- Second Letter To Mother (Δεύτερο γράμμα στη μητέρα), 1972.
- And Then In Sea-Washed Cyprus... (Και τότ' εν ειναλίη Κύπρω…), 1974.
- Grieving Inside Myself (Πικραινόμενος εν εαυτώ), 1975.
- Cyprus In Aulis (Κύπρος εν Αυλίδι), 1976.
- Poems For Young and Older Children (Ποιήματα για μικρά και μεγάλα παιδιά), 1976.
- Selection from Moments (Επιλογή από τις Στιγμές), 1978.
- In The Language I First Spoke (Στη γλώσσα που πρωτομίλησα), 1980.
- Cyprus Figurines (Κύπρια ειδώλια), 1980.
- With the Fear of Man (Μετά φόβου ανθρώπου…), 1982.
- Fighting Against (Αντίμαχα), 1983.
- In Conclusion (Ως εν κατακλείδι), 1984.
- To Slaughter (Επὶ σφαγήν), 1985.
- In The Shade (Υπό σκιάν), 1987.
- Now That I Can Read Better (Τώρα που διαβάζω καλύτερα), 1988.
- The Messages of the Verse (Του στίχου τα μηνύματα), 1991.
- Let the verse take you by the hand (Αφήστε τον στίχο να σας πάρη απ' το χέρι), 1993.
- Costas Montis: A Small Selection From His Poetry (Κώστας Μόντης: Μικρή ανθολόγηση από την ποίησή του), 2003.

Plays

- Entry To Stress Prohibited (Απαγορεύεται η είσοδος στο άγχος), 1973.

Translations by Costas Montis

- Aristophanes' Lysistrata (Trans. into the Cypriot dialect, 1972)
- Aristophanes' Ecclesiazouses (Trans. into the Cypriot dialect, 1988)

Anthologies

- Anthology of Cypriot Poetry (From Ancient Times Until Today) [Ανθολογία Κυπριακής Ποιήσεως (Απ' τ' αρχαία χρόνια ως σήμερα)], in collaboration with Andreas Christofides, 1965; 2nd ed. 1973
- Anthology of Young Cypriot Poets (Ανθολογία νέων Κυπρίων ποιητών), 1969.
- Cypriot Folk Songs (Κυπριακά Δημοτικά Τραγούδια), 1971.

Complete Works

- Complete Works (Άπαντα), 1987.
- Complete Works: Addendum (Άπαντα: Συμπλήρωμα), 1988.
- Complete Works: Addendum 2 (Άπαντα: Συμπλήρωμα Β), 1991.
- Complete Works: Addendum 3 (Άπαντα: Συμπλήρωμα Γ), 1993.
- Complete Works: Addendum 4 (Άπαντα: Συμπλήρωμα Δ), 1997.
- Complete Works: Addendum 5 (Άπαντα: Συμπλήρωμα Ε), 1999.
- Complete Works: Addendum 6 (Άπαντα: Συμπλήρωμα Ζ), 2001.
- Complete Works: Addendum 7 (Άπαντα: Συμπλήρωμα Στ), 2002.

English translations

- Moments, trans. by Amaranth Sitas and Charles Dodd, 1965.
- Letters To Mother and Other Verses, trans. by Amaranth Sitas and Charles Dodd, 1984.
- Anthology of Cypriot Poetry, trans. in collaboration with Andreas Christofides and Amy Mims, 1974.
- Closed Doors: An Answer to Bitter Lemons by Lawrence Durrell, trans. by David Roessel & Soterios Stavrou, 2004 (ISBN 0932963110).
- Afentis Batistas, trans. by Stalo Monti-Pouagare, 2006 (ISBN 0977376907).

Other translations

- Heer Batistas en de andere dingen (Dutch ed., trans. by Hero Hokwerda; 2008; ISBN 978-90-808942-4-2)
- Afendi Batistas (German ed., trans. by Konstanze Jablonowski; 1988; ISBN 3-923728-33-6)
- Porte chiuse (Italian ed., trans. by Daniele Macris; 2001; ISBN 88-8234-036-8)
- Anthologie de la Poesie Chypriote (French ed.; trans. in collaboration with Henry Aufrere and Andreas Christofides, 1972)
