= Telemaco Arcangeli =

Italian racewalker

Personal information
- Nationality: Italian
- Born: 29 July 1923 Rome, Italy
- Died: 18 November 1998 (aged 75) Rome, Italy

Sport
- Country: Italy
- Sport: Athletics
- Event: Race walk
- Club: ATAC Roma

Achievements and titles
- Personal best: 10 km walk: 45:46 (1950)

Telemaco Arcangeli (4 July 1923 – 18 November 1998) was an Italian racewalker.

== Biography ==
He competed in the 1952 Summer Olympics without being able to reach the final.

== Achievements ==
Year	Competition	Venue	Position	Event	Performance	Note
1952	Olympic Games	(Finland) Helsinki	Heat	10 km walk	48:00	
