= Pēteris Zeltiņš =

Latvian racewalker

Pēteris Zeltiņš (14 July 1914 – 9 November 1994) was a Latvian racewalker who competed for the Soviet Union in the 1952 Summer Olympics.
