= Giuseppe Kressevich =

Italian racewalker

Personal information
- Nationality: Italian
- Born: 8 February 1916 Trieste, Austria-Hungary
- Died: 13 April 1994 (aged 78)
- Height: 1.80 m (5 ft 11 in)
- Weight: 70 kg (154 lb)

Sport
- Country: Italy
- Sport: Athletics
- Event: Race walk

Giuseppe Kressevich (8 February 1916 – 13 April 1994) was an Italian racewalker who competed at the 1952 Summer Olympics,
