= Ernest Weber (race walker) =

American racewalker

Personal information
- Nationality: American
- Born: February 29, 1908
- Died: May 13, 1950 (aged 42)

Sport
- Sport: Athletics
- Event: Racewalking

Ernest Weber (February 29, 1908 – May 13, 1950) was an American racewalker. He competed in the men's 10 kilometres walk at the 1948 Summer Olympics.
