= Fred Sharaga =

American racewalker

Personal information
- Nationality: American
- Born: September 18, 1909
- Died: March 24, 2004 (aged 94)

Sport
- Sport: Athletics
- Event: Racewalking

Fred Sharaga (September 18, 1909 – March 24, 2004) was an American racewalker. He competed in the men's 10 kilometres walk at the 1948 Summer Olympics. Sharaga was a three-time national champion in walking events in the 1940s, and represented the Young Men's Hebrew Association.
