= John Mikaelsson =

Swedish racewalker (1913–1987)

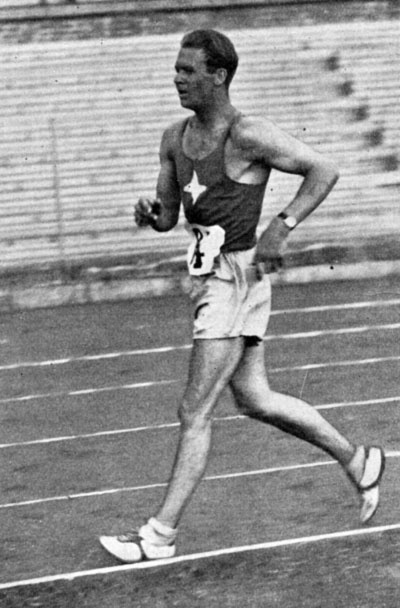

Personal information
- Born: 6 December 1913 Kristinehamn, Sweden
- Died: 16 June 1987 (aged 73) Placer County, California, United States
- Height: 183 cm (6 ft 0 in)
- Weight: 73 kg (161 lb)

Sport
- Sport: Athletics
- Event: 10 km walk
- Club: IFK Kristinehamn (1932–38); Sundbybergs IK (1939–42); Västerås SK (1943–44); Stockholms GK 1945–52

Achievements and titles
- Personal best: 42:52.4 (1945)
Medal record
Men's athletics
Representing Sweden
Olympic Games
Gold medal – first place	1948 London	10 km walk
Gold medal – first place	1952 Helsinki	10 km walk
European Championships
Gold medal – first place	1946 Oslo	10 km walk
Bronze medal – third place	1950 Brussels	10 km walk

John Frederik Mikaelsson (6 December 1913 – 16 June 1987) was a Swedish race walker who competed at two Olympic Games.

== Biography ==
Mikaelsson won the British AAA Championships title in the 7 miles event at the 1937 AAA Championships and the 1938 AAA Championships but his career was then interrupted by World War II.

He set 14 European and world records in various events. He was most successful over 10 km distance, winning a European title in 1946. Mikaelsson competed domestically in running, skiing, orienteering, handball and football.

At the 1948 Summer Olympics in London he won the gold medal in the men's 10 kilometres walk competition and four years later successfully defended his title by winning the 10 km walk at the 1952 Summer Olympics in Helsinki.

Records
Preceded by (Germany) Fritz Bleiweiss	Men's 20km Walk World Record Holder; 30 May 1937 – 5 June 1955	Succeeded by (Czechoslovakia) Josef Doležal
