= Salvatore Cascino =

Italian racewalker

Personal information
- Nationality: Italian
- Born: 21 August 1917 Palermo
- Died: 21 April 1990 (aged 72) Palermo

Sport
- Country: Italy
- Sport: Athletics
- Event: Race walk

Salvatore Cascino (21 August 1917 – 21 April 1990) was an Italian racewalker who competed at the 1948 Summer Olympics.
