= Fritz Schwab =

Swiss racewalker

Medal record

Men's athletics

Representing Switzerland

Olympic Games
| Silver medal – second place | 1952 Helsinki | 10 km walk |
| Bronze medal – third place | 1948 London | 10 km walk |

European Championships
| Gold medal – first place | 1950 Brussels | 10 km walk |
| Silver medal – second place | 1946 Oslo | 10 km walk |

Erich Arthur Fritz Schwab (31 December 1919 in Berlin – 24 November 2006) was a Swiss race walker. He won two Olympic medals over 10 kilometres in 1948 and 1952. In addition he won two medals at the European Championships in 1946 and 1950.

His father Arthur Tell Schwab was an Olympic silver medalist in 1936.
