= Sigfús Sigurðsson (athlete) =

Icelandic athlete

Personal information
- Born: 19 February 1922 Hofsstaðar, Iceland
- Died: 21 August 1999 (aged 77) Reykjavík, Iceland

Sport
- Sport: Shot put, hammer throw, discus throw

Achievements and titles
- Olympic finals: 1948

Sigfús Sigurðsson (19 February 1922 – 21 August 1999) was an Icelandic athlete. He competed at the 1948 Olympics in the shot put and finished 12th with a throw of 13.66 m. Earlier that year he set his personal best at 14.78 m.

His grandson, also Sigfús Sigurðsson, won a silver medal in handball at the 2008 Olympics.
