= Arne Börjesson =

Swedish racewalker

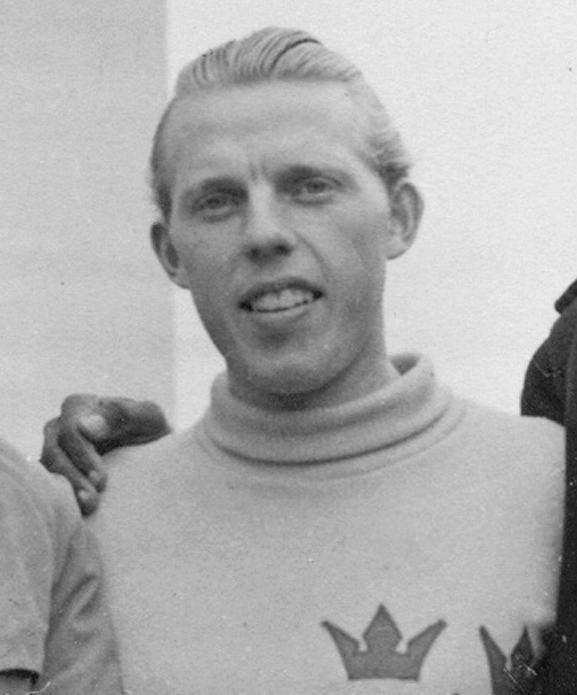

Personal information
- Nationality: Swedish
- Born: 14 April 1925 Gothenburg, Sweden
- Died: 2 July 2017 (aged 92) Gothenburg, Sweden

Sport
- Sport: Athletics
- Event: Race walking
- Club: IFK Göteborg

Achievements and titles
- Personal best: 10 kmW – 44:38 (1953)

Knut Arne Börjesson (14 April 1925 – 2 July 2017) was a Swedish racewalker. He competed in the 10 km event at the 1952 Summer Olympics, but failed to reach the final.

Börjesson won the British AAA Championships title in the 2 miles walk event at the 1949 AAA Championships.
