= Ragnvald Thunestvedt =

Danish racewalker

Ragnvald Thunestvedt (20 January 1926 – 2 May 1980) was a Danish racewalker who competed in the 1952 Summer Olympics.
