= David Guiney =

Irish Olympic athlete, sports journalist and historian (1921–2000)

Personal information
- Nationality: Irish
- Born: 31 January 1921 Kanturk, County Cork, Ireland
- Died: 14 October 2000 (aged 79) Dublin, Ireland
- Height: 186 cm (6 ft 1 in)
- Weight: 109 kg (240 lb)

Sport
- Sport: Athletics
- Event: shot put
- Club: Clonliffe Harriers

David Guiney (31 January 1921 – 14 October 2000) was an Irish Olympic athlete, sports journalist and historian. He competed in the men's shot put at the 1948 Summer Olympics.

== Early life and education ==
Guiney was born 31 January 1921 in Kanturk, County Cork, one of four sons of John Guiney, a solicitor and All-for-Ireland MP for Cork North (1913–18), and Mary Guiney (née Buckley), of O'Brien St, Kanturk. He was educated locally and at Trinity College Dublin, deciding to join the Civil Service before he had completed his degree.

== Sporting career ==
Guiney played Gaelic football, hurling, and rugby for his native Kanturk, played rugby with Clontarf in Dublin, and competed with the Civil Service, Dublin University, Clonliffe Harriers, and Donore Harriers athletic clubs, affiliated to the AAU at the time of Ireland's athletics dispute, and competed in the shot put at the 1948 Olympics.

He won a total of thirty Irish titles the last in 1956, as weight thrower, sprinter and long jumper (tying for the 1941 NACA senior long jump championship with international soccer and rugby player Kevin O'Flanagan (1919–2006). In 1941 won national junior titles in five different disciplines:the shot put, javelin, discus, high jump, and broad jump. His 1953 put of 15.14m stood as an Irish record for ten years.

Guiney twice won the British AAA Championships title in the shot put event at the 1947 AAA Championships and 1948 AAA Championships.

== Journalism ==
In 1946 he resigned from his post in the civil service after being refused leave to represent Ireland in the European Championships in Oslo and turned to journalism shortly afterwards. He began his career as a journalist with the Irish Independent and subsequently became sports editor of the Irish Press in 1964. He also worked for a number of now-defunct British Sunday papers, including the Sunday Graphic, Empire News, Reynolds’ News, and Sunday Dispatch. In the early 1970s he moved to the Sunday Mirror as Irish sports editor, while remaining based in Dublin, and wrote a regular column for the Cork Evening Echo.

== Books ==
Guiney was acknowledged as Ireland's foremost authority on the Olympics and published over thirty books on a wide variety of sports, including Gaelic games, rugby, soccer and golf. Books on the Olympic games included The friendly Olympics (1982), written about the 1932 games; and Ireland and the Olympic games (1976). He also wrote four books of sporting reminiscences: A little wine and a few friends (1976), The days of the little green apples (1976), Good days and good friends (1985), and Happy hours (1994.

== Award schemes ==
Guiney was involved in the establishment and development of many Irish sports awards, including the All-Stars and the GAA Player of the Month scheme. His roles included chair of the Association of Sports Journalists of Ireland (ASJI), and being prominent in the International Sports Press Association, and the International Association of Olympic Historians (ISOH) as well as being a former chairman of the Rugby Writers of Ireland.

== Marriage and death ==
Guiney married Phyllis (‘Phyl’) Ludgate from Dublin in 1947, a relation of the Irish champion weight thrower Tom Ludgate; they had three children. He died after a short illness at the Mater Hospital, on 14 October 2000, and was cremated after a funeral service in St Mary's Church of Ireland, Howth.
