= Lars Hindmar =

Swedish racewalker

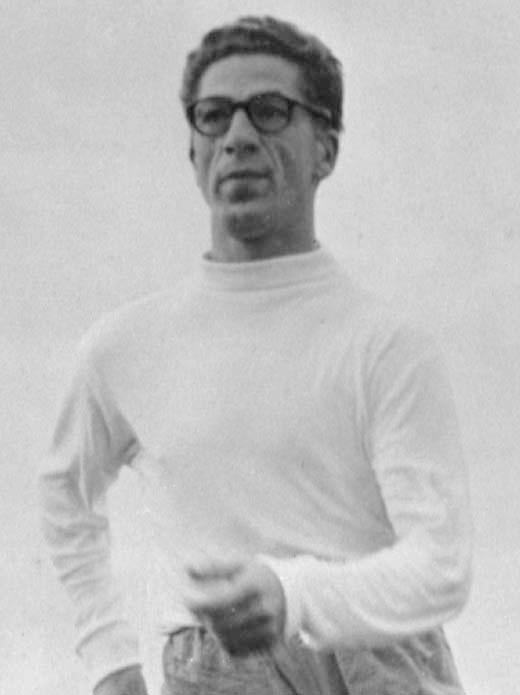

Personal information
- Born: 11 December 1921 Borås, Sweden
- Died: 21 December 2018 (aged 97)

Sport
- Sport: Athletics
- Event: Race walking
- Club: Malmö AI

Achievements and titles
- Personal bests: 10 kmW – 43:33 (1956); 20 kmW – 1:30:38 (1956)

Lars Erik Hindmar (born Karlsson; 11 December 1921 – 21 December 2018) was a Swedish racewalker. He competed at the 1952 Summer Olympics in the 10 km and at the 1956 Summer Olympics in the 20 km event, but was disqualified in both cases.

Hindmar won two British AAA Championships title in the 2 and 7 miles walk event at the 1946 AAA Championships and the 2 miles walk event at the 1947 AAA Championships.
