= Antanas Mikėnas =

Lithuanian racewalker (1924–1994)

Medal record

Men's athletics

Representing Soviet Union

Olympic Games
Silver medal – second place	1956 Melbourne	20 kilometre walk

Antanas Mikėnas (24 February 1924, Ramygala – 23 September 1994, Vilnius) was a Lithuanian athlete who competed mainly in the 20 kilometer walk during his career. He trained at Spartak in Vilnius. Mikėnas competed for the USSR at the 1956 Summer Olympics held in Melbourne, Australia where he won the silver medal in the men's 20 kilometer walk competition.
