= Gabriel Reymond =

Swiss racewalker (1923–2021)

Gabriel Reymond (15 April 1923 – 20 October 2021) was a Swiss racewalker who competed in the 1952 Summer Olympics and in the 1960 Summer Olympics. He later lived in Renens, and died in Lutry on 20 October 2021, at the age of 98.
