= Émile Maggi =

French racewalker

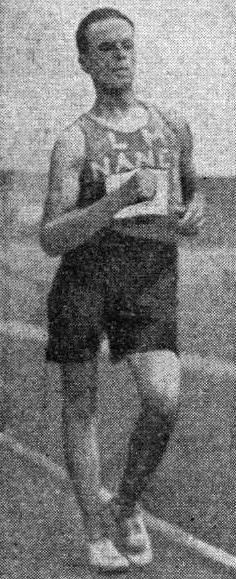
- Émile Maggi in 1941

Medal record

Men's athletics

Representing France

European Championships
| Silver medal – second place | 1950 Brussels | 10 km walk |
| Bronze medal – third place | 1946 Oslo | 10 km walk |

Émile Maggi (12 March 1908 – 19 April 1986) was a French racewalker who competed in the 1948 Summer Olympics and in the 1952 Summer Olympics.
