= Kaare Hammer =

Norwegian racewalker (1918–2006)

Kaare Hammer (4 June 1918 – 2 May 2006) was a Norwegian racewalker who competed in the 1948 Summer Olympics and in the 1952 Summer Olympics.
