= Harry Churcher =

British racewalker

Personal information
- Nationality: British (English)
- Born: 21 November 1910 Wandsworth, London, England
- Died: 24 June 1972 (aged 61) London, England

Sport
- Sport: Athletics
- Event: Racewalking
- Club: Belgrave Harriers

Achievements and titles
- Personal best: 10 km walk: 45:29.8 (1950)

Harry George Churcher (21 November 1910 – 24 June 1972) was a British racewalker who competed at the 1948 Summer Olympics.

== Biography ==
Churcher, a plumber and electrician by trade, finished second in the 1933 Surrey 2-mile walking championship before winning several county title. Churcher and his older brother Charlie both walked for Belgrave Harriers. He finished third behind Bert Cooper in the 2 miles walk event at the 1936 AAA Championships, second behind Swede John Mikaelsson (who would later be a double Olympic champion) at the 1937 AAA Championships and third behind Bert Cooper at the 1938 AAA Championships.

Churcher finally won two AAA Championships titles and became the national 2 miles walk champion and the national 7 miles champion at the 1939 AAA Championships before his career was interrupted by World War II.

He won further two 2 miles walk titles (1948) and four 7 miles walk titles (1947, 1948, 1949) at the prestigious AAA Championships.

At the 1948 Olympic Games, Churcher competed in the 10 km walk.
