= Louis Chevalier (race walker) =

French racewalker (1921–2006)

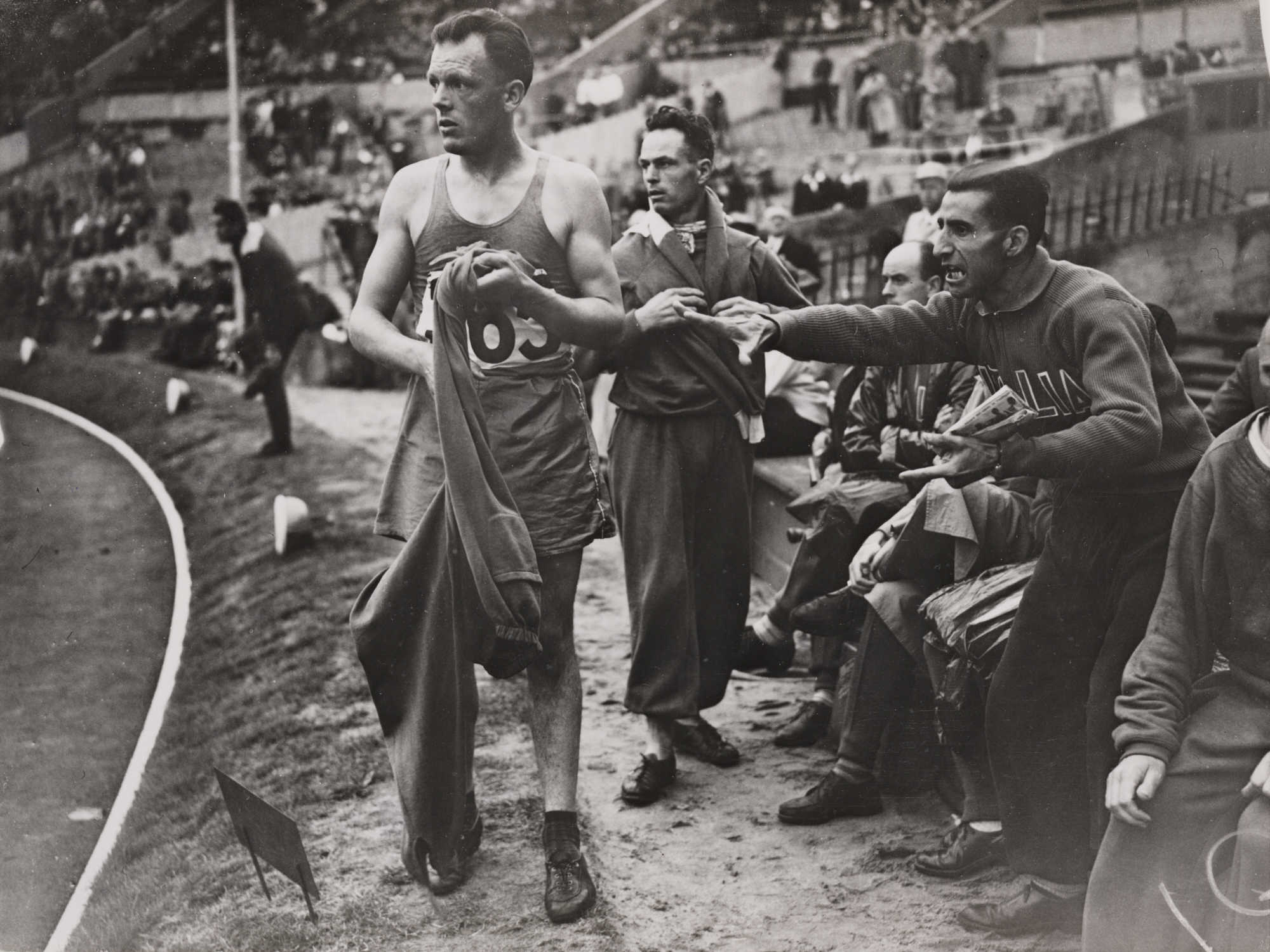
Louis Chevalier is disqualified during heat two of the 10K walk held at Wembley

Louis Chevalier (28 April 1921 – 13 November 2006) was a French racewalker who competed in the 1948 Summer Olympics and in the 1952 Summer Olympics.
