= Deaths in June 1987 =

The following is a list of notable deaths in June 1987.

Entries for each day are listed alphabetically by surname. A typical entry lists information in the following sequence:

- Name, age, country of citizenship at birth, subsequent country of citizenship (if applicable), reason for notability, cause of death (if known), and reference.

== June 1987 ==
=== 1 ===
- Khwaja Ahmad Abbas, 72, Indian film director, novelist and journalist.
- Emiliano Álvarez, 74, Spanish cyclist.
- Fernando Armiñán, 60, Spanish Olympic alpine skier (1948).
- Errol Barrow, 67, Caribbean statesman, Prime Minister of Barbados.
- Francis B. Burch, 68, American politician, Attorney General of Maryland, cancer.
- Georg Friedel, 73, German footballer.
- Rashid Karami, 65, Lebanese statesman, Prime Minister of Lebanon, assassinated.

=== 2 ===
- Georges Doriot, 87, French-born American businessman, founded American Research and Development Corporation, cancer.
- Klaus Gamber, 70, German Catholic liturgist.
- Sammy Kaye, 77, American bandleader and songwriter ("Blueberry Hill", "Harbour Lights"), cancer.
- Henry Palmé, 79, Swedish Olympic marathon runner (1936).
- François Perroux, 83, French economist, professor at the Collège de France.
- Sebastiaan Matheus Sigismund de Ranitz, 86, Dutch jurist and Nazi collaborator.
- Andrés Segovia, 94, Spanish virtuoso classical guitarist, heart attack.

=== 3 ===
- Bruno Bernard, 75, American photographer known for pin-up photography of Marilyn Monroe, cancer.
- Jackie Fields, 79, American professional boxer, world welterweight champion.
- Noel Peter Fox, 76, American district judge (United States District Court for the Western District of Michigan).
- Curt McDowell, 42, American underground filmmaker, AIDS.
- Malcolm McLeod, 73, American law enforcement officer, Sheriff of Robeson County, North Carolina, heart attack.
- Alan Montagu-Stuart-Wortley-Mackenzie, 52, British landowner and hereditary peer, member of the House of Lords.
- Will Sampson, 53, American actor (One Flew Over the Cuckoo's Nest), kidney failure.
- Herbert Schultze, 77, German submarine commander during World War II.

=== 4 ===
- Maurizio Vitale Cesa, 41, Italian entrepreneur and sportswear inventor, AIDS.
- Ann Evers, 71, American film actress.
- Noel Guillen, 60, Trinidadian cricketer.
- Giovanni Kasebacher, 76, Italian Olympic cross-country skier (1936).
- Dean Moon, 60, American automobile designer.
- Lionelo Patiño, 67, Peruvian Olympic athlete (1948).

=== 5 ===
- Joe Bradley, 58, American NBA player.
- Mansel Carter, 85, American businessman and prospector, cancer.
- Carlos de la Guerra, 74, Peruvian Olympic athlete (1936).
- Kenneth McLean, 90, British army officer.
- Vasant Kumar Pandit, 66, Indian politician, member of parliament.
- Aleksander Szenajch, 82, Polish Olympic sprinter (1924).

=== 6 ===
- Alexander Altmann, 81, Austro-Hungarian–born American Orthodox Jewish scholar and rabbi.
- Burhan Atak, 82, Turkish Olympic footballer (1928).
- Harry Clapson, 92, Australian rules footballer.
- Colin Colahan, 90, Australian painter and sculptor.
- Dmitri Klebanov, 79, Soviet Ukrainian composer.
- Barney Koch, 64, American MLB player (Brooklyn Dodgers).
- Fulton Mackay, 64, Scottish actor and playwright, stomach cancer.
- Mari Mori, 84, Japanese author, heart failure.
- Richard Münch, 71, German actor.
- Eduard Petiška, 63, Czech writer.
- Aneesur Rahman, 59, Indian-born American physicist (molecular dynamics).
- Dragan Sotirović, 74, Serbian-born major in the Yugoslav army.

=== 7 ===
- István Adorján, 73, Hungarian Olympic cyclist (1936).
- John Blofeld, 74, British writer on Asian thought and religion, cancer.
- Shosei Go, 70, Taiwanese baseball player who played in Japan (Mainichi Orions, Tokyo Giants).
- Pedro Lonchibuco, 66–67, Argentine Olympic gymnast (1948).
- Hashimoto Mantaro, 54, Japanese sinologist and linguist.
- Herbert M. Seneviratne, 61, Sri Lankan lyricist and actor.
- Giovanni Stamati, 74, Italo-Albanian Catholic hierarch
- Cahit Zarifoğlu, 46, Turkish poet and writer.

=== 8 ===
- Jimmy Darrow, 49, American NBA player (St. Louis Hawks).
- Gary Driscoll, 41, American R&B-style drummer, murdered.
- Jean Elichagaray, 100, French Olympic rower (1912).
- George Finey, 92, Australian newspaper artist.
- Yogi Horton, 33, American R&B, funk, jazz and rock drummer, suicide.
- Alexander Iolas, 79, Egyptian-born American art gallerist, AIDS.
- Gregorio López, 35, Spanish Olympic handball player (1980).
- Daniel Mandell, 91, American film editor.
- Jacques Fred Petrus, 39, West Indian–born businessman and a pioneer of post-disco music, murdered.
- Reginald Teagle, 78, Australian cricketer.

=== 9 ===
- Kenneth Althaus, 91, American brigadier general in the U.S. Army.
- Raya Dunayevskaya, 77, Russian-born American philosopher, founder of Marxist humanism in the United States.
- Monique Haas, 77, French pianist.
- Gustaf Håkansson, 101, Swedish cyclist who cycled the length of Sweden in a race at age 66.
- Louis Van Iersel, 93, American sergeant in the U.S. Army, Medal of Honor recipient.
- Madge Kennedy, 96, American actress, respiratory failure.
- António Reymão Nogueira, 77, Portuguese Olympic equestrian (1952, 1960).
- Les Patton, 71, Australian rules footballer.
- Grandon Rhodes, 82, American actor.
- Wilhelm Runge, 91, German electrical engineer and physicist (radar).

=== 10 ===
- Daud Beureueh, 87, Indonesian military governor of Aceh.
- Shamraj Bhalerao, 88, Indian noble.
- August Eskelinen, 88, Finnish Olympic biathlete (1924).
- Gordon Fox Rule, 88, Brazilian-born English WWI flying ace.
- Elizabeth Hartman, 43, American actress (A Patch of Blue, You're a Big Boy Now).
- Jeevan, 71, Indian actor.
- Alain Montpetit, 36, Canadian television and radio personality and actor, overdose.
- Paul Rekers, 78, American Olympic long-distance runner (1932).
- Harris Kenneth Wangelin, 74, American district judge.
- Booty Wood, 67, American jazz trombonist.

=== 11 ===
- Ralph Guldahl, 75, American professional golfer, heart attack.
- Charles Laverne, 83, French Olympic sailor (1928).
- Aleksandr Lokshin, 66, Soviet composer of classical music.
- Enrique del Moral, 82, Mexican architect.
- Álvaro Vieira Pinto, 77, Brazilian philosopher and translator.
- B. S. Madhava Rao, 87, Indian mathematician and physicist.
- Joseph Salas, 81, American Olympic boxer (1924).
- Dan Vadis, 49, American actor (The Triumph of Hercules), overdose.

=== 12 ===
- Tuvia Bielski, 81, Belarusian militant, leader of the Bielski group.
- Carlo Boscarato, 61, Italian cartoonist and comics artist.
- Luis Duggan, 81, Argentine Olympic polo player (1936).
- Bill Edwards, 81, American NFL coach (Detroit Lions).
- Gradim, 78, Brazilian footballer and manager.
- Paul Janes, 75, German international footballer (Fortuna Düsseldorf, Germany).
- C. F. Russell, 90, American occultist.
- Apostol Sokolov, 69, Bulgarian international footballer (Levski Sofia, Bulgaria).
- Józef Tusk, 80, Polish luthier, grandfather of Polish Prime Minister, Donald Tusk.

=== 13 ===
- Huck Betts, 90, American Major League baseball player (Philadelphia Phillies).
- Vera Caspary, 87, American screenwriter, novelist and playwright, stroke.
- Gerald Foster, 86, American painter.
- Bernard Hesling, 82, British-born Australian muralist and painter.
- Johnny High, 30, American NBA basketballer (Phoenix Suns), car accident.
- Kanam E. J., 61, Indian novelist, short story writer and lyricist.
- Heinz Kloss, 82, German linguist.
- Pentti Kontula, 56, Finnish Olympic boxer (1952).
- Cemil Meriç, 70, Turkish writer and translator.
- Geraldine Page, 62, American actress (The Trip to Bountiful, Hondo, Summer and Smoke), heart attack.
- Giulio Panicali, 88, Italian actor and voice actor.
- Annie Villiger, 73, Swiss Olympic diver (1936).

=== 14 ===
- Stanisław Bareja, 57, Polish filmmaker (Teddy Bear).
- Isaac Barrientos, 21, Puerto Rican Olympic boxer (1984).
- Curt Boettcher, 43, American musician and record producer, heart attack.
- Sean Daly, 54, Irish Olympic equestrian (1960).
- Kline Gilbert, 56, American NFL player (Chicago Bears).
- Les Favell, 57, Australian test cricketer.
- Burhanuddin Harahap, 70, Indonesian politician and lawyer, Prime Minister of Indonesia, heart attack.
- Grace Madden, 75, American Olympic pair skater (1936).
- Franco Mignini, 65, Venezuelan Olympic sports shooter (1956).

=== 15 ===
- Walter Heller, 71, American economist, chair of the Council of Economic Advisers, heart attack.
- J. M. Johnson, 75, Nigerian politician and Federal Cabinet Minister.
- George Smith, 49, American MLB player.
- Schoolboy Johnny Taylor, 71, American baseball player.
- Don White, 68, American MLB player (Philadelphia Athletics).

=== 16 ===
- Marguerite de Angeli, 98, American writer and illustrator of children's books (The Door in the Wall).
- June Knight, 74, American actress and singer, stroke.
- Inga-Britt Lorentzon, 51, Swedish Olympic high jumper (1960).
- Wandjuk Marika, 56–57, Aboriginal Australian painter, actor and indigenous land rights activist.
- John Mikaelsson, 73, Swedish Olympic race walker (1948, 1952).
- Aage Myhrvold, 68, Norwegian Olympic cyclist (1948).
- Mangal Singh, 95, Indian politician and legislator, member of Central Legislative Assembly.
- Kōji Tsuruta, 62, Japanese actor and singer, lung cancer.
- Kid Thomas Valentine, 91, American jazz trumpeter and bandleader.

=== 17 ===
- Fabio Battesini, 75, Italian road bicycle racer.
- Simon Bon, 83, Dutch Olympic rower (1924, 1928).
- Dick Howser, 51, American Major League baseball player and manager (Cleveland Indians, Kansas City Royals), brain tumour.
- Yasuo Haruyama, 81, Japanese footballer.
- Jack Poorbaugh, 67, American politician, member of the Florida House of Representatives (1967–1976).

=== 18 ===
- Oluf Berntsen, 95, Danish Olympic fencer (1912).
- Raymond Caesar, 55, American prelate.
- Harold F. Cherniss, 83, American classicist and historian of ancient philosophy.
- Jeanne Grendel, 74, Dutch Olympic swimmer (1928).
- William Kemmey, 74, English cricketer.
- Jay Lawrence, 63, American stand-up comedian and actor.
- Bruce Marshall, 87, Scottish writer (Father Malachy's Miracle).
- Georgy Nissky, 84, Soviet painter.
- Art Spector, 66, American NBA basketballer (Boston Celtics).

=== 19 ===
- C. R. Cheney, 80, English medieval historian.
- Teresa Cormack, 6, New Zealand murder victim.
- Ian Donald, 76, English physician, pioneered diagnostic use of ultrasound in obstetrics.
- Ingemund Fænn, 79, Norwegian newspaper editor.
- Joseph Schwab, 26, German spree killer in Australia, shot by police.
- Pearl Vasudevi, 72, Sri Lankan actress.

=== 20 ===
- Salim Ali, 90, Indian ornithologist and naturalist, prostate cancer.
- Frederic B. Butler, 90, American general in the U.S. Army.
- Knut Hoem, 63, Norwegian politician.
- Knut Johansson, 84, Swedish footballer.
- Leonid Kharitonov, 57, Soviet actor, stroke.
- Fred Laidman, 74, English footballer.
- Howard Maley, 65, American NFL player.
- Hiro Saga, 73, Japanese noblewoman and memoir writer.

=== 21 ===
- Erik Bisgaard, 97, Danish Olympic rower (1912).
- Mariano Cañardo, 81, Spanish road racing cyclist.
- Abram Chasins, 83, American composer, pianist and author, cancer.
- Eastman Jacobs, 84–85, American aerodynamicist.
- Madman Muntz, 73, American businessman, engineer and car salesman, lung cancer.
- Kyril Vassilev, 79, Bulgarian-born American portrait painter, heart attack.
- Phil Weintraub, 79, American Major League baseball player (New York Giants), heart attack.

=== 22 ===
- Nicholas Alkemade, 64, British tail gunner in the R.A.F. during World War II, survived freefall of 5.5 km.
- Fred Astaire, 88, American actor, singer and dancer (Funny Face, The Towering Inferno), pneumonia.
- Mao Bangchu, 83, Chinese army general.
- August Bivec, 77, Croatian footballer and coach.
- Percy Chalmers, 91, Australian rules footballer.
- Dom Fucci, 58, American NFL player (Detroit Lions).
- Rudolf Haidegger, 63, Austrian Olympic sprinter (1952).
- John Hewitt, 79, Northern Irish poet.
- Muhammad Taqi-ud-Din al-Hilali, 94, Moroccan Salafi.
- Joseph Meyer, 93, American songwriter ("California, Here I Come"; "If You Knew Susie").
- Robert N. C. Nix Sr., 88, American politician, member of U.S. House of Representatives (1958–1979), cardiac arrest.
- Frank Rehak, 60, American jazz trombonist, throat cancer.

=== 23 ===
- Holmes Baldridge, 84, American attorney.
- Sauveur Ducazeaux, 76, French road bicycle racer.
- Adrienne Gessner, 90, Austrian actress.
- Tito Lara, 54, Puerto Rican singer.
- Jan de Looper, 73, Dutch Olympic field hockey player (1936).
- John James Smith, 75, Canadian politician, member of the Canada House of Commons (1949–1953).
- Mary Somerset, Duchess of Beaufort, 90, British peeress, niece of Queen Mary.
- Muhammad Subuh Sumohadiwidjojo, 86, Indonesian founder of the Subud movement.
- Anthony Tew, 78, English cricketer.

=== 24 ===
- Linc Chamberland, 46, American jazz guitarist, leukemia.
- Jackie Gleason, 71, American actor and comedian (The Hustler, Smokey and the Bandit), cancer.
- Lofty Herman, 79, English cricketer.
- Hines Johnson, 76, Jamaican Test cricketer for the West Indies.
- Tiny Mills, 74, Canadian professional wrestler.
- Fred Newman, 45, American MLB player (Los Angeles Angels).

=== 25 ===
- Leiv Amundsen, 89, Norwegian librarian and philologist.
- John Ness Beck, 56, American composer and arranger of choral music, cancer.
- Boudleaux Bryant, 67, half of American husband-and-wife songwriting team ("Love Hurts", "Wake Up Little Susie"), cancer.
- Carl Huisken, 84, Dutch Olympic sailor (1928).
- Nibaran Chandra Laskar, 85, Indian singer and politician, member of parliament.
- Tony Skyrme, 64, British physicist, embolism.

=== 26 ===
- Jay Avrea, 66, American MLB player (Cincinnati Reds).
- Henk Badings, 80, Indonesian-born Dutch composer.
- Arthur F. Burns, 83, Austro-Hungarian–born American diplomat, U.S. Ambassador to West Germany, heart surgery.
- Mopsy Fraser, 64, Australian rules footballer.
- Glen Hall, 49, South African cricketer.
- George Johnson, 74, American jazz reedist.
- Cully Lidberg, 86, American NFL player (Green Bay Packers).
- Wayne Meylan, 41, American NFL footballer (Cleveland Browns), plane crash.
- Richard Pim, 86, British civil servant and naval officer.
- Gerhard Wagner, 88, German naval rear admiral.
- Tony Webster, 65, American screenwriter, esophageal cancer.

=== 27 ===
- Ratomir Dugonjić, 71, Bosnian politician and ambassador, president of the Socialist Republic of Bosnia and Herzegovina.
- Althea Flynt, 33, American co-publisher of Hustler magazine, wife of Larry Flynt, drowning after overdose.
- Doris Grimes, 78, British Olympic diver (1928).
- György Kiss, 51, Hungarian Olympic long-distance runner (1968).
- Pat McGuigan, 52, Irish singer.
- Donald Nixon, 72, American brother of U.S. President Richard Nixon, pneumonia.
- František Šafránek, 56, Czech international footballer (Dukla Prague, Czechoslovakia), heart failure.
- W. Horace Schmidlapp, 71, American investment banker and Broadway producer, husband of Carole Landis.
- Billy Snedden, 60, Australian politician, speaker of the House of Representatives, Leader of the Opposition, heart attack.

=== 28 ===
- Gajananrao Joshi, 76, Indian vocalist and violinist.
- Emrys Lloyd, 81, British Olympic fencer (1932, 1936, 1948, 1952).
- Bill Schuster, 74, American MLB player.
- Jim Taylor, 86, Australian-born Papua New Guinean explorer, pneumonia.

=== 29 ===
- Elizabeth Cotten, 94, American folk and blues musician.
- C. Hamilton Ellis, 78, English railway writer and painter.
- Antonio Janni, 82, Italian football manager and international player (Torino, Italy), Olympic medalist.
- Erik Jensen, 65, Danish Olympic boxer (1948).
- Ērihs Pētersons, 77, Latvian international footballer (RFK Riga, Latvia) and ice hockey player (Latvia).
- Murray Sanders, 77, American physician and military officer, biological warfare pioneer in World War II.
- Shmuel Tamir, 64, Israeli independence fighter and lawyer.

=== 30 ===
- Ramani Bartholomeusz, 20, Sri Lankan actress and model, Miss Sri Lanka 1985, pushed out of moving car.
- King Donovan, 69, American actor and director, cancer.
- Maurice Geraghty, 78, American screenwriter, film director and producer.
- Li Hanhun, 91, Chinese army general.
- Federico Mompou, 94, Spanish composer and pianist, respiratory failure.
- Thor Thorvaldsen, 78, Norwegian Olympic sailor (1936, 1948, 1952, 1956).

=== Unknown date ===
- Glen Daly, 66–67, Scottish singer and entertainer ("The Celtic Song").
- John J. Reynolds, 97, American Olympic marathoner.
