= Håkansson =

Håkansson, Hakansson, Håkanson or Hakanson is a Swedish surname. Notable people with the surname include:

- Anders Håkansson (born 1956), ice hockey player
- Ane Håkansson Hansen (born 1975), Danish curler
- Daniel Håkansson, Swedish musician, Diablo Swing Orchestra
- Erik Hakansson or Eric of Norway (960s – 1020s), earl of Lade, ruler of Norway and earl of Northumbria
- Eva-Marie Håkansson (born 1960), Swedish swimmer
- Fredrik Håkansson (born 1975), Swedish table tennis player
- Gabriella Håkansson, (born 1968), Swedish novelist
- Gustaf Håkansson, (1885–1987), "Super Grandpa" cycling the Sverigeloppet aged 66
- Hakan Hakansson of Norway (1204–1263), King of Norway
- Håkan Håkansson (born 1947), Swedish organizational theorist
- Hans Håkansson (1908–1993), Swedish footballer
- Ingvar Fredrik Håkansson, World War II pilot
- Jesper Håkansson (born 1981), Danish footballer
- Johan Håkansson (died 1432), Swedish archbishop
- Jonas Håkansson (born 1974), Swedish ice hockey player
- Kenny Håkansson, Swedish bassist, the Hellacopters
- Kiki Håkansson (born 1929), winner of the first Miss World beauty pageant
- Lars-Erik Håkansson (born 1950), Swedish curler
- Ludvig Håkanson (born 1996), Latvian basketball player
- Mattias Håkansson (born 1993), Swedish footballer
- Mikael Håkanson (born 1974), Swedish ice hockey player
- Nils Håkansson, late medieval Swedish painter
- Ola Håkansson (born 1945), Swedish singer, composer and producer
- Olle Håkansson (1927–2001), Swedish football player
- Olle Håkansson (curler) (born 1956), Swedish curler
- Patric Håkansson (born 1977), Swedish curler and coach
- Per-Arne Håkansson (born 1963), Swedish politician
- Stig Håkansson (1918–2000), Swedish sprinter, long jumper and curler
- Sven Håkansson (1909–1997), Swedish long-distance runner
- Ulla Håkansson (born 1937), Swedish equestrian

== See also ==
- T. J. Hockenson, American football player
