= How They Got Game =

How They Got Game is a project that aims to explore the historical and cultural impact of new media, through interactive simulation and video gaming. The involvement was through people researching many defined areas of computing, such as storytelling, strategy, simulation, sports, and shooters.

== Project ==
The preservation of software and documentation is an important aspect of this project, where How They Got Game constructed a digital archive of the source material. This includes preserving both the digital code of the software itself as well as the experience surrounding the software, to the extent possible. This includes the cultural context of the software.

The project also introduced a Stanford class offered in the Science, Technology, and Society program called the "History of Computer Game Design".

== Personnel ==
Henry Lowood and Tim Lenoir headed the project; and there were other contributors involved with the project, such as Casey Alt, Georgios Panzaris, Rene Patnode, Doug Wilson, Waynn Lue, David Lui, and Sarah Wilson. Technical developers involved were Casey Alt and Zachary Pogue.

Henry Lowood is the Harold C. Hohbach Curator of History of science and technology, and film and media collections at Stanford University. He has been an employee of the university for 32 years. He began his profession immediately after graduating from the University of California.

Lowood began his profession at Stanford University as an ordinary librarian in the 1980s; he was soon promoted to his current role. Since 2000, Lowood has headed a project named "How They Got Game". The main focus of the project is the history and preservation of digital games, virtual worlds, and interactive simulations as new media forms now merging. The research was conducted in five main areas of computer games: storytelling, strategy, simulation, sports, and shooters. He spoke to Robert Ashley in an episode of A Life Well Wasted about the project.

== Impact ==
One outcome of the project is the Machinima Archive, which has been exhibited in two museums in 2003 and 2004, which features the worlds of computer games, art, and military simulation. The Machinima Archive is a joint effort of the Internet Archive, the How They Got Game project, the Academy of Machinima Arts and Sciences, and Machinima.com. The archive is a collection of machinima films, which can be found on the Internet Archive, and accepts Machinima productions from various internet publishers and other producers.
