= It's a grand old team =

"Grand Old Team" or "It's a Grand Old Team" may refer to one of two football songs:

- The Celtic Song, associated with Celtic Football Club
- The Everton Song, associated with Everton Football Club

Or, popular fan forum - GrandOldTeam.com
