= Hail, Hail, the Gang's All Here =

1917 American song

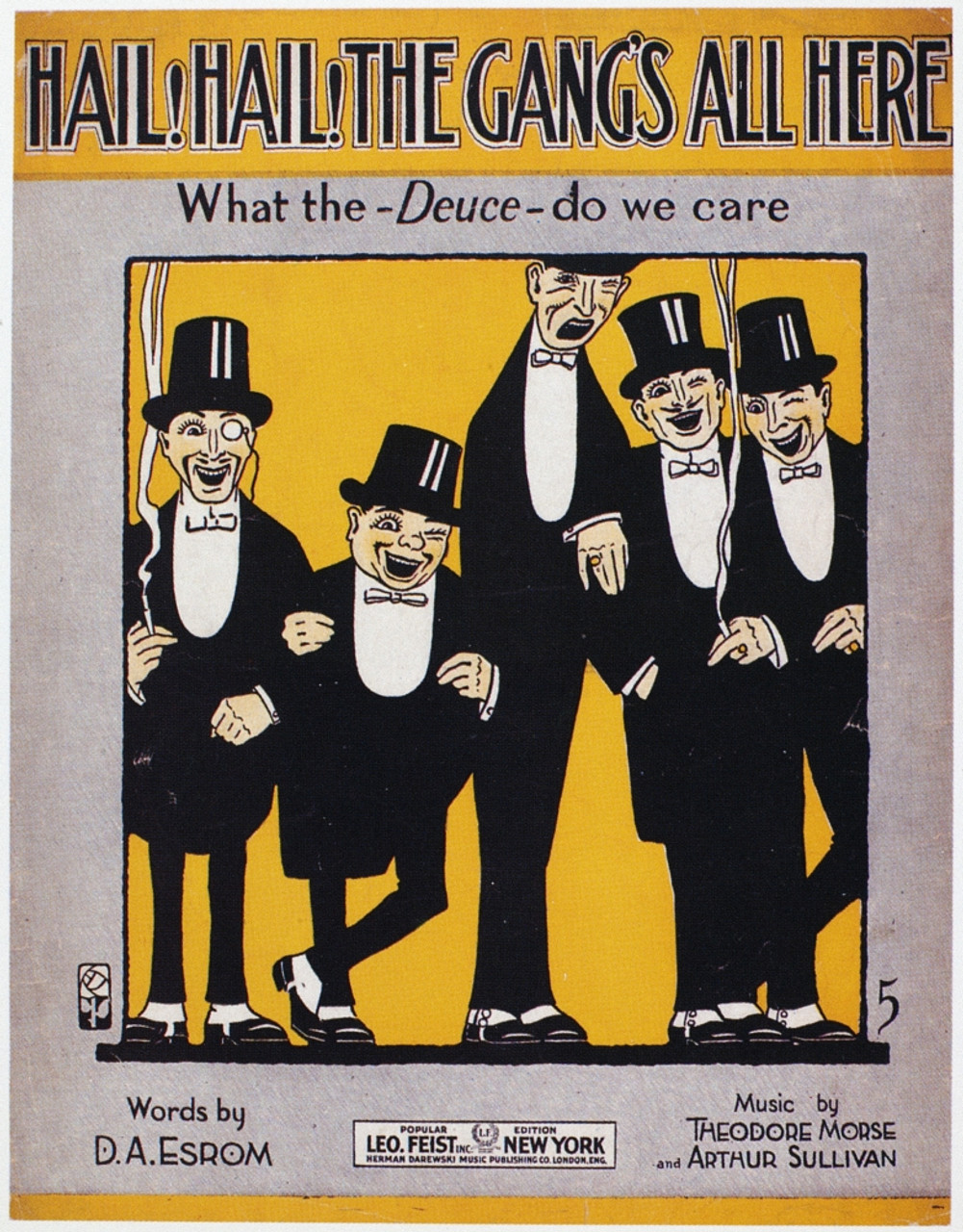
Sheet music cover, 1917

Hail, Hail, the Gang's All Here is an American popular song first published in 1917. The lyrics, written by D. A. Esrom (pseudonym of Theodora Morse) to a tune composed by Arthur Sullivan for the 1879 comic opera The Pirates of Penzance, are:

Hail, hail, the gang's all here.
What the heck do we care,
What the heck do we care?
Hail, hail, the gang's all here.
What the heck do we care now?

== History ==
The melody was originally part of "With Cat-Like Tread" in Act II of Pirates and echoes the Anvil Chorus from Giuseppe Verdi's opera Il Trovatore. W. S. Gilbert’s original lyrics set by Sullivan to the tune are:

Come, friends, who plough the sea.
Truce to navigation,
Take another station.
Let's vary piracy
With a little burglary

The lyric "Hail, hail, the gang's all here" had unofficially been added to Sullivan's melody before 1917. It was referenced in American newspapers as a familiar song as early as 1898, sung at political and other gatherings. A Philadelphia Inquirer news item from April 1, 1898, for example, stated that during a raucous meeting, members of the Philadelphia Common Council loudly sang, "Hail, hail, the gang's all here, what the hell do we care! What the hell do we care!" Likewise, a Delaware state legislature session in March 1901 was disrupted when Democratic members loudly sang the song. The title line of the song is also quoted in the closing measures of the 1915 song "Alabama Jubilee". Also in 1915, the Ohio State University fight song Across the Field incorporated the title phrase as the penultimate lyric.

== The Celtic Song ==
By the 1950s, the chorus of the song (with revised lyrics) was used in Irish and Scottish communities as part of "The Celtic Song", sung by the fans of Glasgow Celtic in Scotland and later other teams. Glen Daly recorded an "official version" of "The Celtic Song" that is commonly played at Celtic Park prior to matches.

== External resources ==
- Sheet music with both verse and chorus
- Lyrics with MIDI on nih.gov
