= Simulated Real Time =

Simulated Real Time is a literary method of creating an event with the help of authentic material accompanied by a commentary framework. By publishing documents (letters, diaries, official reports etc.) on the date on which they were written but a specified number of years later, an event can be reconstructed with exactly the same duration as when it first took place. The aim of this method is to gain greater understanding of a historical event in this way, using modern technology to bring it to life as vividly as possible. The method is giving an important contribution to contemporary Remembrance Culture, in a time where the survivors of the Holocaust are getting fewer.

The first project ever to be published in Simulated Real Time was the literature and art project 32 Postkarten, by Torkel S Wächter, in which 32 authentic postcards sent from Hamburg during 1940 and 1941 were published in Simulated Real Time – on the date they were written, but 70 years later. This project has been followed up by Wächter's on this day 80 years ago, built around authentic letters, diary entries and official documents that are being published on the day on which they were written, but 80 years later. This online publication started on 30 January 2013, eighty years to the day since Hitler was appointed Chancellor, and will end on 2 July 2013 (according to the projects website). It depicts the Nazis’ first five months in power, and how this affects the life of a German-Jewish civil servant family in Hamburg.

January 30, 2013 was also the starting date of 1933: The Beginning of the End of German Jewry in which the Jewish Museum Berlin throughout the year 2013 will present a variety of primary source materials that bear witness to the disenfranchisement and exclusion of German Jews, as well as to aspects of their everyday life (according to the museum's website). The project is part of Diversity Destroyed, a cultural project under the auspices of Berlin City.

In March 2014 32 Postkarten - Post aus Nazi-Deutschland, ISBN 9783862822928, was published as a book.
