= Torkel S. Wächter =

- Born: 25 March 1961 (age 65); Stockholm, Sweden
- Writing career
- Genres: Fiction, non-fiction

Torkel S Wächter (born 25 March 1961), a.k.a. Tamara T, is a German-Swedish novelist and airline captain.

== Biography ==
Torkel S. Wächter was born in Stockholm in 1961. Wächter studied economic history, development theory and languages at the universities of Lund, Melbourne and Barcelona, and Jewish studies at Paideia, the European Institute for Jewish Studies in Sweden, and architecture at the Royal Swedish Academy of Arts in Stockholm.

After a stint as a fashion model in Paris and Barcelona, Wächter trained as a diver in the Royal Swedish Navy before starting his aviation career. He received his pilot's wings at Ljungbyhed Air Force Base in 1985 and was employed by Scandinavian Airlines from 1986 to 1999. During his years as an airline captain he wrote travelogues and articles for several magazines. Since 1998 he has been involved in a number of online start-ups. In 2008–2009 Wächter participated in a project concerned with the preservation of cultural heritage on the Balkans under the auspices of the NGO Cultural Heritage Without Borders. Wächter has also taken part in various projects in Hamburg dealing with the memory of the Nazi era. He has lived in Copenhagen, Barcelona, Madrid, Melbourne and Stockholm. Since 2006 is Wächter living in Berlin.

== Bibliography ==
Wächter's debut novel Samson, was published in 1997 by Natur och Kultur; its prose was universally praised for style and accuracy, e.g., "It is a long time since I read a book so subtly written in such skilfully composed prose and with such audacious use of language." (Rolf Johnsson, Länsposten) – "A disturbing book written in concise, unaffected language complementing perfectly the content," (Birgitta Hybinette, Östgöta Correspondenten) – "Wächter's use of language is captivating, personal and often beautifully effective," (Simone Söderhjelm, Aftonbladet) – "In addition to that one is delighted by the simple, clear language" (Maria Ekendahl, Göteborgs Posten) – "Wächter's first novel presents us with a very skilled author, a mature narrator and a polished stylist." (Björn Widén, Örebrokuriren).

Wächter's second novel, Ciona, an Autobiology (published under the pseudonym "Tamara T" by AlfabetaAnamma, 2002), was the first book written pseudonymously to be short-listed for the August Prize for fiction.

In the Yearbook of the Swedish Institute, 2002, the author and literary critic Jan Arnald a.k.a. Arne Dahl wrote: "The most interesting of the novels with a gender-specific orientation this year is Tamara T's enigmatic "autobiography", Ciona. This is certainly a politically incorrect novel which, at least on the surface, repudiates gender as a social construction and claims the supremacy of biology. The lucid, elegant prose makes it so double-edged that it can easily be read in the diametrically opposite way. Tamara T is the undisclosed pen name of an experienced author who has been published elsewhere. There are indications that she is a woman."

And some months later the literary critic Magnus Eriksson wrote in the Literary Annual published by the Nordic Council: "However, one of the Swedish novels in 2002 which attracted by far the most attention was Ciona – an Autobiology, published under the pseudonym Tamara T. This is a novel about sexuality and role-playing. The focus is on two women: the first-person narrator and the elusive Gabriella, always referred to in the third person. The narrator is watching Gabriella, the woman who always comes between her and her lover whenever she falls in love.

The narrator is a researcher specializing in Ascidiacea or sea squirts. The novel's name comes from the species Ciona intestinalis, a solitary species of sea squirt. Sea squirts are surrounded by a protective mantle, and they absorb nutrients by filtering water through the organism. The sea squirt lives a stationary life attached to a rock or cliff. The narrator is also a solitary being. She is frozen in denial of her own sexuality, as if enveloped in a protective mantle. Her consciousness becomes an impassive filter that impressions filter through. The detailed descriptions of the life of the sea squirt in the novel turn out to be emotional projections. In fact, Gabriella, too, could be a projection, a carrier of the narrator's baser instincts. She often tempts the narrator into a quick seduction, an act of gratuitous sex, only to take over when the narrator expresses doubts. But we cannot know for sure. The text is at once both open and guarded: open to interpretation, yet guarding its secret. And relentless in its expression of the experience of a split life and personality.

There was a great deal of speculation about who was behind the pseudonym Tamara T. Names of authors such as Carina Rydberg, Gabriella Håkansson and Mara Lee were mentioned. All the guesses focused on women. When the novel was nominated for the August Prize, writer and pilot Torkel Wächter stepped forward. He had been concerned that the novel would not be taken seriously if it were known that the writer was a man. This may indicate that estrangement (whether existential, gender-based or social) is not merely a characteristic of literature, but of the literary scene as well."

The project In Drino Veritas, deals with the architectural preservation of the World Heritage Site Gjirokastra in the Drino Valley in Albania, through art and literature it tells the story of a possible future for the region, based on historical facts and earlier achievements. The project was displayed in Gjirokastra, Albania, as well as in the Galleri Mejan and Arkitekturmuséet Museum of Architecture in Stockholm (spring and summer 2009).

Simulated Real Time is an art and literature project dealing with memory, that is devised and coordinated by Wächter. Its first part, 32 Postkarten, was launched in March 2010. On the website 32postkarten.com it is possible to read 32 authentic postcards sent from Germany during 1940 and 1941. The first of these was published, on 29 March 2010, seventy years to the day since it was written. The following 31 postcards are to be published in 'simulated real time' – on the date they were written, but 70 years later. When the online phase is concluded a book will be published. The second part of Simulated Real Time will be launched in 2013. The project has been received with great enthusiasm in Germany.

Meines Vaters Heimat, was published to great acclaim in July 2021.

=== Fiction ===
- Samson (novel, 1997)
- Ciona – an Autobiology (novel, under the pseudonym Tamara T, 2002)
- Meines Vater Heimat (novel, under the author name Torkel S Wächter, 2021)

=== Non-fiction ===
- In Drino Veritas, art and literature as a development project (2008–2009)
- Simulated Real Time, an art and literature project dealing with memory – Part One 32 Postkarten (2010) / 32 Postcards (2010) / 32 Brevkort (2011) – Part Two on this day 80 years ago (2013)
- The Investigation (narrative non-fiction, 2013) ISBN 9781783010417
- 32 Postkarten (narrative non-fiction, 2014) ISBN 9783862822928
- Die Ermittlung (narrative non-fiction, 2014) ISBN 978-3-86282-378-9
