= WALTIC =

The WALTIC logotype.

WALTIC, the Writers’ and Literary Translators’ International Congress, titled "The Value of Words", is a bi-annual international literary congress founded and owned by The Swedish Writers’ Union. Having its premier launch in Stockholm between 29 June and 2 July 2008, WALTIC’s aim and thematic scope is divided in accordance to three key elements: Increase literacy, Safeguard freedom of expression, and Strengthen authors’ rights.

Chairman of The Swedish Writers' Union and President of WALTIC 2008: Mats Söderlund. Program Committee: Gabriella Håkansson and Henrik C. Enbohm. WALTIC 2008 honorary guest was poet Tomas Tranströmer. "I am glad to participate in the WALTIC congress because it is devoted to democracy, and the act of reading is a very good example of pure democracy in action," said writer Philip Pullman when asked about his participation in the 2008 congress.

== Speakers ==
WALTIC 2008 keynote speakers were Mia Couto and Nawal El-Saadawi.

Among the invited speakers present included:

- Türker Armaner
- Antonia Arslan
- Yusuf Azemoun
- Karin Barber
- Ann Louise Bardach
- Abdelkader Benali
- Charles Bernstein
- Calixthe Beyala
- Giannina Braschi
- David Brookshaw
- Mircea Cărtărescu
- Mauro Covacich
- Tsitsi Dangarembga
- Assia Djebar
- Gamal el-Ghitany
- Horace Engdahl
- James English
- Filip Florian
- Jean-Claude Guédon
- Josef Haslinger
- Rafael Hernández
- Ho Anh Thai
- Uzodinma Iweala
- Clara Janés
- Eileen Julien
- Jonas Hassen Khemiri
- Jamaica Kincaid
- Antije Krog
- Leevi Lehto
- Eileen Julien
- Henning Mankell
- Ana Menendez
- Gcina Mhlope
- Rosa Montero
- Bharati Mukherjee
- Herta Müller
- Simone Murray
- Sonia Nimr
- Saliha Paker
- Elena Poniatowska
- Philip Pullman
- Laura Restrepo
- Rodrigo Rey Rosa
- Hans Rosling
- Alfian Bin Sa’at
- Gayatri Chakravorty Spivak
- Dava Sobel
- Muniz Sodré
- Saša Stanišic
- Krister Stoor
- Farzaneh Taheri
- Shaun Tan
- Yoko Tawada
- Dubravka Ugrešic
- Leonardo Valencia
- Binyavanga Wainaina (not present due to illness)
- Frank Westerman
- Wu Ming

== WALTIC Resolution ==
During WALTIC 2008 a resolution was adopted stating that: "Literature is a source of knowledge with the strength to empower entire populations", hence underlining that "Literacy, freedom of expression and authors' rights are keys to the never-ending pursuit of truth, for the development of societies based on democratic and humanitarian values as well as for the individual aspiring to express his or her unique knowledge and experience", and moreover, that "Increasing literacy is essential to improvement of welfare and democratic processes, and to the safeguarding of human rights." The resolution also noted that "Safeguarding freedom of expression makes it possible for both the ordinary citizen and decision makers to better understand the world around them and thus to make informed decisions".
