= Real-time simulation =

Computer model which executes at the same rate as the system it models

Real-time simulation refers to a computer model of a physical system that can execute at the same rate as actual "wall clock" time. In other words, the computer model runs at the same rate as the actual physical system. For example, if a tank takes 10 minutes to fill in the real world, it would take 10 minutes to fill in the simulation as well.

Real-time simulation occurs commonly in computer gaming, but also is important in the industrial market for operator training and off-line controller tuning. Computer languages like LabVIEW, VisSim and Simulink allow quick creation of such real-time simulations and have connections to industrial displays and programmable logic controllers via OLE for process control or digital and analog I/O cards. Several real-time simulators are available on the market including xPC Target and RT-LAB for mechatronic systems, Simulink for power electronic simulation, and RTDS for power grid simulation.

== Definition ==
In a real-time simulation, the simulation is performed in discrete time with a constant step (also known as fixed step) simulation as time moves forward in an equal duration of time. Other techniques having variable step are used for high frequency transients but are unsuitable for real time simulation. In a real time simulation, the time required to solve the internal state equations and functions representing the system must be less than the fixed step. If calculation time exceeds the time of the fixed step, an over run is said to have occurred and the simulation now lags behind the actual time. In simple words, real-time simulation must produce the internal variables and output within the same length of time as its physical counterpart would.

Configuring models to run in real-time enables one to use hardware-in-the-loop simulation to test controllers. It's possible to make design changes earlier in the development process, reducing costs and shortening the design cycle.

== In academic curricula ==
Real-time simulators are used extensively in many engineering fields. As a result, the inclusion of simulation applications in academic curricula can provide great value to the student. Statistical power grid protection tests, aircraft design and simulation, motor drive controller design methods and space robot integration are a few examples of real-time simulator technology applications.

== See also ==
- Human-in-the-loop
- Simulated Real Time, a literary method unrelated to the type of computer models described on this page
