= Kvistofta Church =

- Kvistofta kyrka
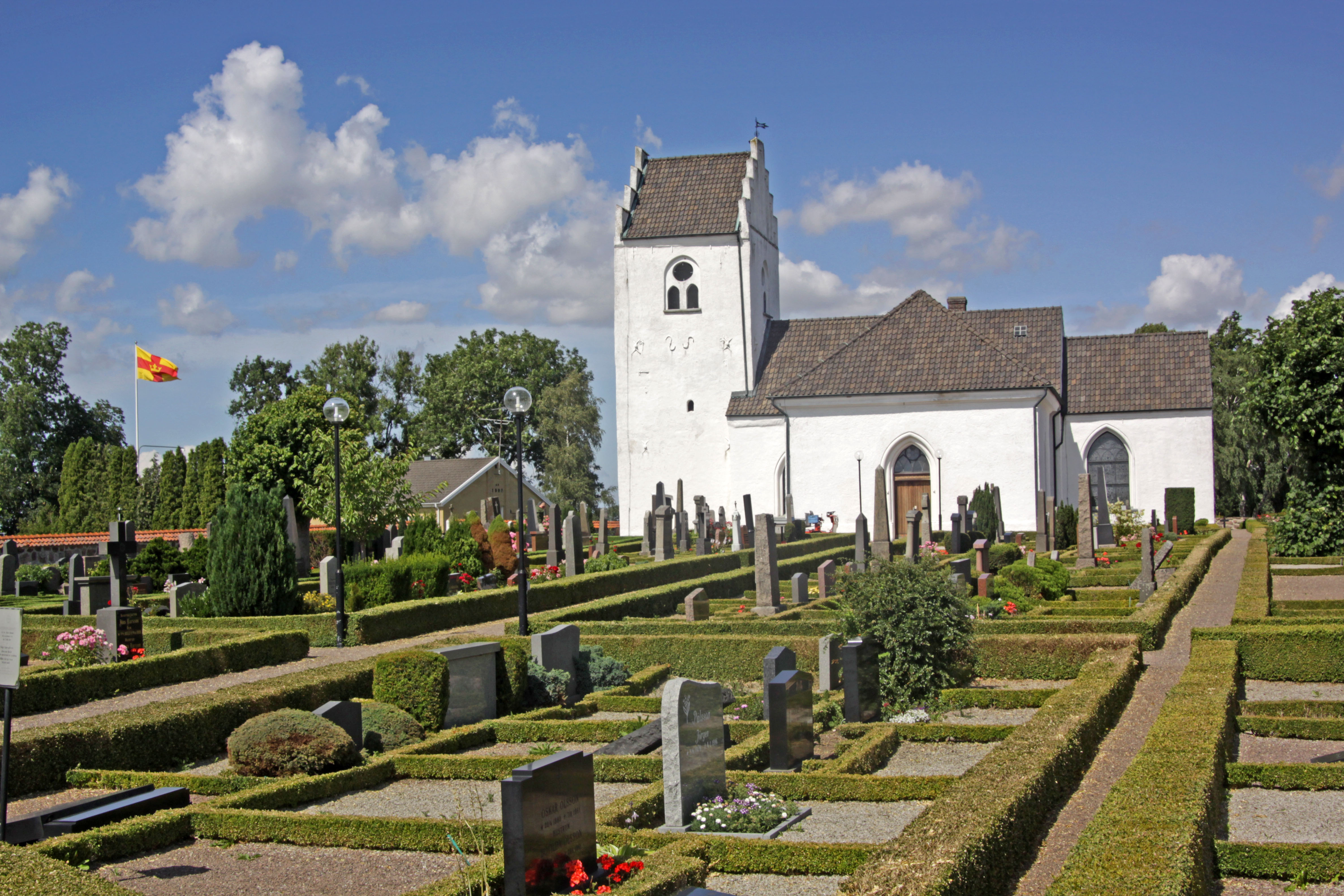
- Kvistofta Church

- 55°58′09″N 12°49′45″E
- Country: Sweden
- Denomination: Church of Sweden

Kvistofta Church (Swedish: Kvistofta kyrka) is a medieval church in Kvistofta (Helsingborg Municipality) in the province of Scania, Sweden. It was built during the 12th century, and modified and enlarged during the later Middle Ages, the 18th century and the 19th century. It contains remains of medieval murals.

== History and architecture ==
Kvistofta Church was built during the first half of the 12th century, and originally consisted of a nave, chancel and an apse. The tower was erected during the first half of the 13th century, and was enlarged during the late Middle Ages. The interior was altered during the late 15th century, when vaults made of brick replaced the earlier ceiling.

Further changes were made after the Reformation. The transept was constructed 1779–1787; at that time most of the medieval vaults were destroyed, as well as the original apse. A western entrance was also opened. Considerably later, in 1949, the church was equipped with stained glass windows, designed by artist Ralph Bergholtz.

Cyclist Gustaf Håkansson is buried in the cemetery of Kvistofta Church.

== Murals and furnishings ==
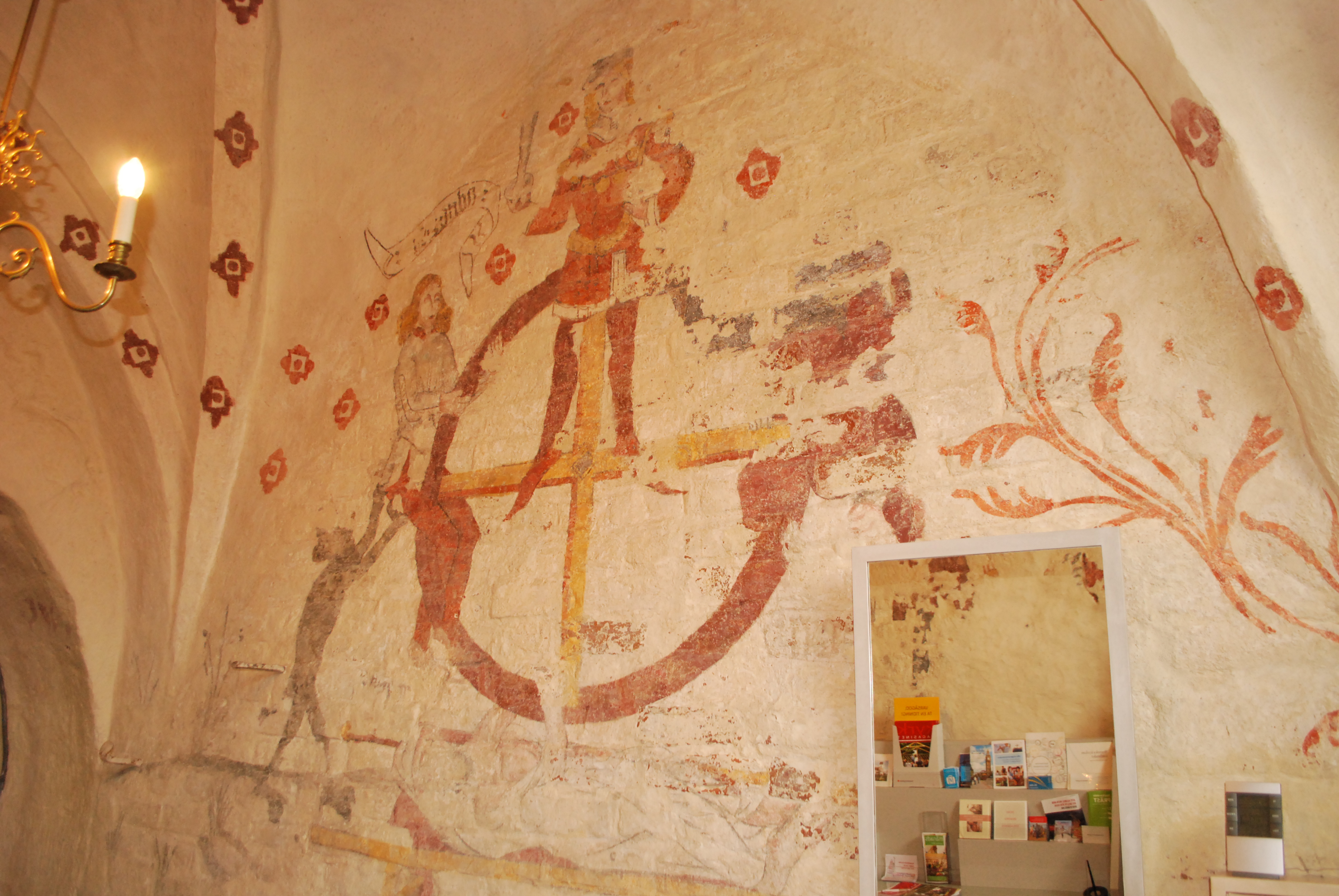
Medieval mural depicting the Wheel of Fortune

The church contains the remains of medieval murals from several periods in the nave and the chancel. In the church porch, two more well-preserved murals depict Cain and Abel and the Wheel of Fortune.

The church furnishings date mainly from the 19th century. The altarpiece is a 19th-century copy of a painting by Raphael. The baptismal font is an Italian-manufactured urn, repurposed as a font. According to local tradition it had been sold to the Russian Imperial Court in Saint Petersburg, but the ship on which it was transported sunk and it was washed ashore in Sweden.
