= Lisa Lindstrom =

American swimmer

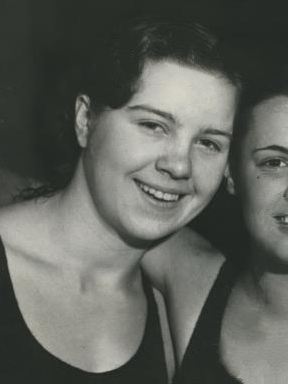
- Lindstrom in 1931

Personal information
- Full name: Anna Lisa Lindstrom-Olson
- National team: United States
- Born: August 12, 1912 Jersey City, New Jersey, U.S.
- Died: June 22, 1994 (aged 81) Brooklyn, New York, U.S.
- Spouse: Eugene John Olson m. 1936

Sport
- Sport: Swimming
- Strokes: Freestyle
- Club: Women's Swimming Association
- College team: New York University (NYU)
- Coach: Louis Handley (WSA); Frances Froatz (NYU)

Lisa A. Lindstrom (August 12, 1912 – June 22, 1994), also known by her married name Lisa Olson, was an American competition swimmer who swam for the Women's Swimming Association of New York, and New York University, and represented the United States at the 1928 Summer Olympics in Amsterdam, where she had a tie for fifth place in the finals of the 100-meter backstroke.

Lindstrom was born on August 12, 1912 in New Jersey to Sigfrid and Kristina (Jondotter) Lindstrom, but the family moved to New York in Lisa's youth. Lindstorm learned to swim by the age of three at Brooklyn's Sea Gate and Poverty Beach in Brooklyn's Gravesend Bay. Lindstrom began swimming competition before High School, and at 12 attended a meet in Indianapolis with the Women's Swimming Association where she won her first race.

At an early age, Lindstrom began serious training with the Women's Swimming Association (WSA) in Brooklyn, New York, coached by Louis Handley and founded by Charlotte Epstein. Eleanor Holm, a U.S. team member of Lindstrom's at the 1928 Olympics, had also been coached by Handley at the WSA.

In July 1928, at the Women's National Championships in Rockaway Beach, New York, Lindstrom swam the 220-yard backstroke in 3:03.4, breaking the year-old record of her WSA teammate Adelaide Lambert by over seven seconds.

== 1928 Olympics ==
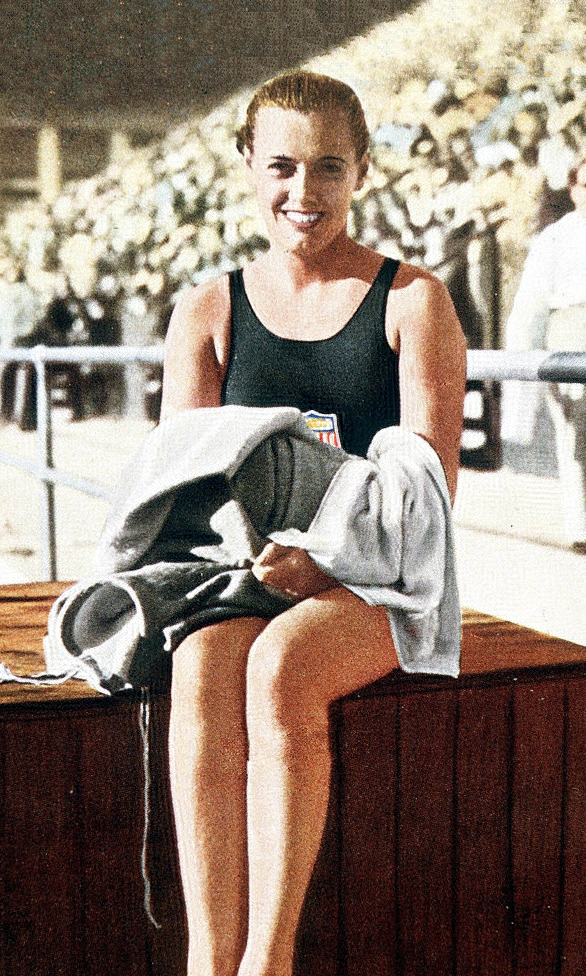
Eleanor Holm, 1932

As a 16-year-old, Lindstrom tied for fifth with American Eleanor Holm in the early August event final of the women's 100-meter backstroke at the 1928 Amsterdam Olympics with a time of 1:24.4. Holland's Zus Braun took the gold medal that year, and Great Britain's Ellen King and Joyce Cooper took the silver and bronze respectively. Lindstrom was only 1.6 seconds from contending for a bronze medal with third place British finisher Joyce Cooper. The Women's Swimming Association was widely represented at the 1928 U.S. Olympic swimming team and in addition to Lindstrom included Agnes Geraghty, Adelaide Lambert, Eleanor Holm, Ethel McGary, and Martha Norelius, constituting around 20 % of the team.

== Swimming career highlights ==
Lindstrom set 24 national records and was the winner of more than 20 national and metropolitan championships. In outdoor competition, she captured the 1928 AAU championship in the 220 yard backstroke. She also held the 1930 AAU long-distance swim title. In 1927-1929, she helped the Women's Swimming Association capture the 4x200 yard free relay event. In indoor competition, she swam on winning teams with the WSA in 1928 in the 3x100 yard medley relay, and on the 4x100 yard freestyle relay in both 1927 and 1930. A distance swimming enthusiast as well, in the summer of 1930 Lindstrom placed in the 4.5 mile swim from Great Kills, Staten Island to Midland Beach.

== New York University ==
Lindstrom was a 1934 graduate of New York University where she majored in Mathematics. She swam for the NYU's outstanding women's swim program, whose co-ed team had a record of 57-8 in dual meet competition from 1925-1938. At NYU, she was coached by Frances Froatz. A coach and athletic director at NYU for over 20 years, Froatz was a 1976 inductee into the NYU Athletic Hall of Fame.

Swimming in later life, Lindstrom placed second to Lenore Kight in the National Senior Women's 100-yard backstroke championship in April, 1933.

Lindstrom was married to Eugene John Olson on June 5, 1936 at Bay Ridge Episcopal Church in the greater New York City area. Olson worked with Chase National Bank at the time. Around 1934 Lindstrom broke her back in a car accident, affecting the future of her swimming career. Her marriage officially ended her time as a highly competitive swimmer.

== Coaching ==
In 1937, Lindstrom coached Penn Hall Prep School's women's swimming team in Chambersberg. She began as a math instructor at Penn Hall around 1935. An exceptional program, the Penn Hall women's swim team had a record of 25-1 from 1931-1937. Penn Hall was a boarding school, that operated from 1906-1973, originally a girls' school, and featured a Junior College in 1927.

Lindstrom worked as a performer in the Water Follies at the Broadway Auditorium in Buffalo in April, 1938.

== Honors ==
Olson was a member of the National Swimming Hall of Fame and New York University's Athletic Hall of Fame.

She died in Brooklyn, on June 22, 1994, and was buried in Brooklyn's Greenwood Cemetery.
