= Marie-Jeanne Bernard =

Luxembourgish swimmer

Personal information
- Born: 20 March 1909 Luxembourg, Luxembourg
- Died: 21 July 1979 (aged 70) Luxembourg, Luxembourg

Sport
- Sport: Swimming

Marie-Jeanne Bernard (20 March 1909 – 21 July 1979) was a Luxembourgish swimmer. She competed in the women's 100 metre backstroke event at the 1928 Summer Olympics.
