= Swimming at the 1928 Summer Olympics – Women's 100 metre backstroke =

Women's 100 metre backstroke at the Games of the IX Olympiad
- Venue: Olympic Sports Park Swim Stadium
- Date: 9 August 1928 (heats); 11 August 1928 (final)
- Competitors: 12 from 7 nations
- Winning time: 1:22.0

Medalists
1st place, gold medalist(s)		Marie Braun	Netherlands
2nd place, silver medalist(s)		Ellen King	Great Britain
3rd place, bronze medalist(s)		Joyce Cooper	Great Britain

The women's 100 metre backstroke was a swimming event held as part of the swimming at the 1928 Summer Olympics programme. It was the second appearance of the event, which was established in 1924. The competition was held on Thursday and Saturday, 9 and 11 August 1928.

Twelve swimmers from seven nations competed.

== Records ==
These were the standing world and Olympic records (in minutes) prior to the 1928 Summer Olympics.

World record	1:22.0	(Netherlands) Willy den Turk	Rotterdam (NED)	10 July 1927
Olympic record	1:23.2	(United States) Sybil Bauer	Paris (FRA)	20 July 1924

In the first heat Ellen King equalized the world record with 1:22.0 minutes. In the second heat Marie Braun bettered the world record to 1:21.6 minutes.

== Results ==
=== Heats ===
Thursday 9 August 1928: The fastest two in each heat and the fastest third-placed from across the heats advanced to the final.

==== Heat 1 ====
Rank	Swimmer	Nation	Time	Notes
1	Ellen King	Great Britain	1:22.0	Q, WR
2	Marian Gilman	United States	1:24.0	Q
3	Ena Stockley	New Zealand	1:25.4	q

==== Heat 2 ====
Rank	Swimmer	Nation	Time	Notes
1	Marie Braun	Netherlands	1:21.6	Q, WR
2	Lisa Lindstrom	United States	1:23.0	Q
3	Phyllis Harding	Great Britain	1:27.8	
4	Bonnie Mealing	Australia	Unknown	

==== Heat 3 ====
Rank	Swimmer	Nation	Time	Notes
1	Eleanor Holm	United States	1:23.6	Q
2	Joyce Cooper	Great Britain	1:24.2	Q
3	Jeanne Grendel	Netherlands	1:26.2	
4	Else Jacobsen	Denmark	1:31.5	
5	Marie-Jeanne Bernard	Luxembourg	Unknown	

=== Final ===
Saturday 11 August 1928:

Rank	Swimmer	Nation	Time
1st place, gold medalist(s)	Marie Braun	Netherlands	1:22.0
2nd place, silver medalist(s)	Ellen King	Great Britain	1:22.2
3rd place, bronze medalist(s)	Joyce Cooper	Great Britain	1:22.8
4	Marian Gilman	United States	1:24.2
5	Eleanor Holm	United States	1:24.4
5	Lisa Lindstrom	United States	1:24.4
7	Ena Stockley	New Zealand	1:24.4
