= 32 Postkarten =

Art project by Torkel S. Wächter

32 Postkarten is a literature and art project that has been devised and coordinated by Torkel S. Wächter. It retells the story of a German-Jewish family from the outbreak of the Second World War to the Japanese attack on Pearl Harbor. The authentic postcards, with English and German translations, and commentaries, are being published on the Internet from March 2010 in 'simulated real time' - on the date they were written, but 70 years later - at www.32postkarten.com.

It all started ten years ago, when Wächter discovered a number of packing cases in an attic in Stockholm. They contained letters, diaries, old exercise books, newspaper cuttings and a cigar box with black-and-white photographs inside. And above all, in a plastic bag, the 32 postcards written by Wächter's grandparents in Hamburg and posted to his father in Sweden just before the Holocaust.

Given its postcard-length format, the material is well suited for the teaching of secondary and tertiary level history and German in schools. The material will remain available online well after the publication of the last postcard in December 2011.

In March 2014, 32 Postkarten - Post aus Nazi-Deutschland, ISBN 9783862822928, will be published by ACABUS-Verlag.
