= William Kemmey =

English cricketer

Personal information
- Full name: William Kemmey
- Born: 21 July 1912; Atcham, Shropshire, England
- Died: 18 June 1987 (aged 74); Shrewsbury, Shropshire, England
- Batting: Right-handed
- Role: Wicket-keeper

Domestic team information
- Years: Team
- 1939: Northamptonshire

Career statistics
Competition	First-class
Matches	5
Runs scored	55
Batting average	6.87
100s/50s	–/–
Top score	18
Balls bowled	–
Wickets	–
Bowling average	–
5 wickets in innings	–
10 wickets in match	–
Best bowling	–
Catches/stumpings	4/2
- Source: Cricinfo, 16 November 2011

William Kemmey (21 July 1912 – 18 June 1987) was an English cricketer. Kemmey was a right-handed batsman who fielded as a wicket-keeper. He was born at Atcham, Shropshire.

Kemmey made his first-class debut for Northamptonshire against Sussex in the 1939 County Championship. He made four further first-class appearances that season, the last of which came against Worcestershire. In his five first-class matches, he scored 55 runs at an average of 6.87, with a high score of 18, while behind the stumps he took 4 catches and made 2 stumpings.

He died at Shrewsbury, Shropshire on 18 June 1987.
