= Les Patton =

Australian rules footballer, born 1915

Personal information
- Full name: William Leslie Patton
- Born: 24 October 1915; Richmond, Victoria
- Died: 9 June 1987 (aged 71); Maldon, Victoria
- Height: 168 cm (5 ft 6 in)
- Weight: 66 kg (146 lb)

Playing career^{1}
Years	Club	Games (Goals)
1936–37	Richmond	4 (3)
- ^{1} Playing statistics correct to the end of 1937.

William Leslie Patton (24 October 1915 – 9 June 1987) was an Australian rules footballer who played with Richmond in the Victorian Football League (VFL).

Patton later served in the Australian Army during World War II.
