= Fred Laidman =

English footballer

Personal information
- Full name: Frederick Laidman
- Date of birth: 20 June 1913
- Place of birth: Durham, England
- Date of death: 20 June 1987 (aged 74)
- Place of death: Durham, England
- Position: Inside forward

Senior career*
Years	Team	Apps	(Gls)
19??–1934	Crook Town		
1934–1935	Burnley	0	(0)
193?–1936	Wigan Athletic		
1936–1938	Everton	0	(0)
1938–1942	Bristol City	10	(1)
1942–1945	Sunderland	0	(0)
1945–1949	Stockton		
1949–1950	Darlington	2	(0)
- * Club domestic league appearances and goals

Frederick Laidman (20 June 1913 – 20 June 1987) was an English footballer who played as an inside forward in the Football League for Bristol City and Darlington. He was on the books of Burnley and Everton without representing them in the League, was registered with Sunderland during the Second World War, and played non-league football for Crook Town, Wigan Athletic and Stockton.

== Life and career ==
Laidman was born in Durham in 1913. He played football in the North-Eastern League for Crook Town, then, after a two-match trial, turned professional with Burnley, then a Second Division club, in December 1934. He played for the club's 'A' team, and for the reserves in the Central League, but was released on a free transfer at the end of the season without having appeared in the first team. He played for Cheshire League club Wigan Athletic, and signed for Everton of the First Division in December 1936 for a £500 fee. Laidman was retained for the 1937–38 season, but by December, he was available for transfer. Amid interest from Stockport County and Chester, Everton's secretary was instructed to accept offers of £500 or better, but none were forthcoming. At the end of the season, he was transfer-listed at £350. He submitted a written request to be allowed a free transfer, but in June 1938, joined Third Division South club Bristol City for a £250 fee. He never played first-team football for Everton.

Laidman made his debut in the Football League on the opening day of the 1938–39 season in a 2–2 draw away to Watford. The Western Daily Press reported that he "showed up well towards the end". By mid-September, we read that his "passing lacked precision and accuracy", and an unnamed Bristolian in the Cheltenham Chronicle expressed his disappointment with the lack of understanding between the left-wing pairing of Laidman and George Willshaw, suggesting that Laidman needed to play higher up the field and nearer to his partner. He scored in a 2–2 draw at Northampton Town, but lost his place, finished the season with ten League appearances and that one goal, and was listed as available for transfer.

During the Second World War, Laidman served in the Durham Light Infantry. He played for their football team alongside such players as England internationals Walter Boyes and Bill Nicholson. By October 1942, he had been promoted from private to corporal, was playing at right half rather than inside forward, and had signed professional forms with Sunderland. In December, the Sunderland Echo's "Argus" wrote "what a grand little right half he is – full of grit and enthusiasm, capable of running for the proverbial week, and capable of using the ball to the advantage of those in front of him", but sometimes his enthusiasm was to get the better of him. A year of so into his Sunderland career, the same correspondent described him as "sometimes in a hurry to use the ball before he had it under control", and feeding Johnny Spuhler with passes that were well-conceived but so overhit that "some of them Spuhler could not reach if he had a flying start on a Spitfire".

Laidman scored 16 goals from 67 games in three seasons of wartime football for Sunderland, and made one guest appearance for Queens Park Rangers in November 1944, before signing professionally for North Eastern League club Stockton in 1945. He also played as a guest for Leeds United in the Football League North in 1945–46, but the Football Association's ruling that clubs could only field their own registered players in the first postwar FA Cup made him ineligible to guest for Sunderland in that competition. Laidman was a member of the Stockton team that reached the second round proper of the 1947–48 FA Cup, losing only after a replay to Notts County, who fielded Tommy Lawton in both matches. He continued with Stockton until the summer of 1948, when he made a brief return to League football with Darlington. He played just twice in the Third Division North before retiring from the game.

Laidman went on to work on the railways, and died in Durham in 1987, on his 74th birthday.
