= Harry Clapson =

Australian rules footballer

Personal information
- Full name: Henry Alfred Clapson
- Born: 5 March 1895; South Melbourne, Victoria
- Died: 6 June 1987 (aged 92); Lyneham, Australian Capital Territory
- Original team: Norwood Redlegs

Playing career^{1}
Years	Club	Games (Goals)
1925	North Melbourne	7 (3)
- ^{1} Playing statistics correct to the end of 1925.

Henry Alfred Clapson (5 March 1895 – 6 June 1987) was an Australian rules footballer who played with North Melbourne in the Victorian Football League (VFL).
