= Percy Chalmers =

Australian rules footballer

Personal information
- Full name: Percy McDermott Chalmers
- Born: 16 March 1896; Richmond, Victoria
- Died: 22 June 1987 (aged 91); New South Wales

Playing career^{1}
Years	Club	Games (Goals)
1922	Fitzroy	1 (0)
- ^{1} Playing statistics correct to the end of 1922.

Percy McDermott Chalmers (16 March 1896 – 22 June 1987) was an Australian rules footballer who played with Fitzroy in the Victorian Football League (VFL).
