= Jeanne Grendel =

Dutch swimmer

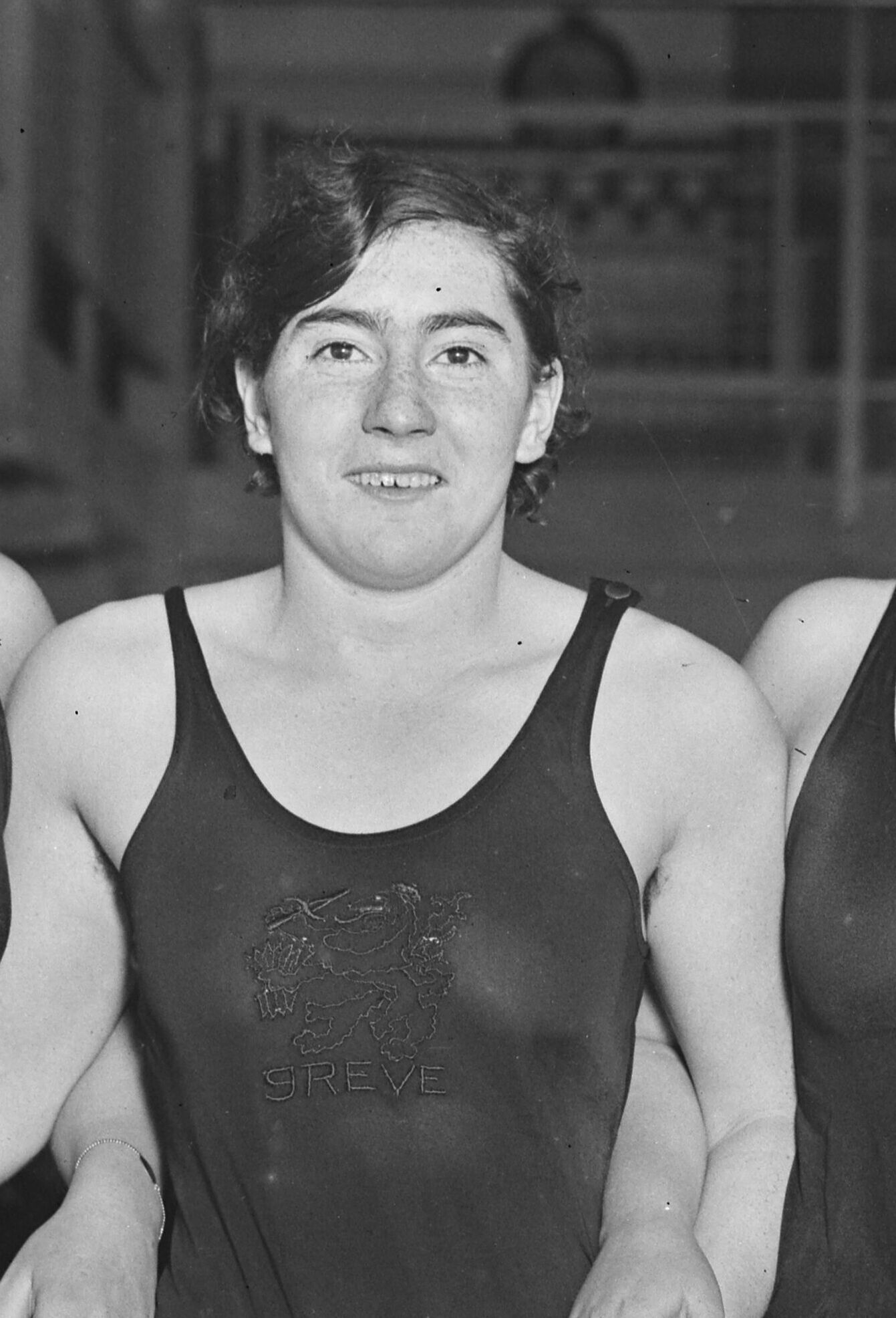
- Jeanne Grendel in 1930

Personal information
- Born: 23 March 1913 Rotterdam, Netherlands
- Died: 18 June 1987 (aged 74) Rotterdam, Netherlands

Sport
- Sport: Swimming

Jeanne Grendel (23 March 1913 – 18 June 1987) was a Dutch swimmer. She competed in the women's 100 metre backstroke event at the 1928 Summer Olympics.
