= Glen Daly =

- Birth name: Bartholomew Francis McGovern McCann Dick
- Born: 1920
- Origin: Glasgow
- Died: June 1987
- Genres: Music hall
- Occupation(s): Shipyard worker, singer, comedian
- Years active: 1961–1980 (approx)
- Labels: Golden Guinea, Piccadilly Records

Glen Daly (born Bartholomew Francis McGovern McCann Dick (1920–1987) was a Scottish singer and entertainer.

== Career ==
Daly was born in Calton, Glasgow, where he attended St Mary's School. On completing his education he started work in the Clydeside shipyards.

Daly began his stage career as a foil to Glasgow music hall artiste Lex McLean, and his contemporaries included Andy Stewart and the Alexander Brothers.

The song for which he is best known "The Celtic Song" is still played at the start of home matches for Celtic F.C. Daly also toured extensively and is probably best remembered for appearing on BBC Scotland show The White Heather Club as well as in many pantomimes at Glasgow's Pavilion Theatre, where he also frequently topped the bill in variety shows Further afield from his native city, Daly was also a popular performer at the Edinburgh Palladium, and in Belfast.

Daly can be heard on Last FM. He has a Celtic supporters' club named after him, in Rothesay, Isle of Bute.

"The Celtic Song" was featured in the US television program, Lost.

== Discography ==
=== Albums ===
- Glasgow Night Out (Pye Golden Guinea, 1971) – UK No. 28
- The Very Best of (Live from the Ashfield Club)
- Legends of Scotland
- The Very Best of Glen Daly

=== Singles ===
- "The Celtic Song"

== See also ==
- Music of Scotland
- Royal Variety Performance
- List of British Music Hall musicians
- List of Scottish musicians
- Celtic F.C.
