= Gabriella Håkansson =

Swedish novelist

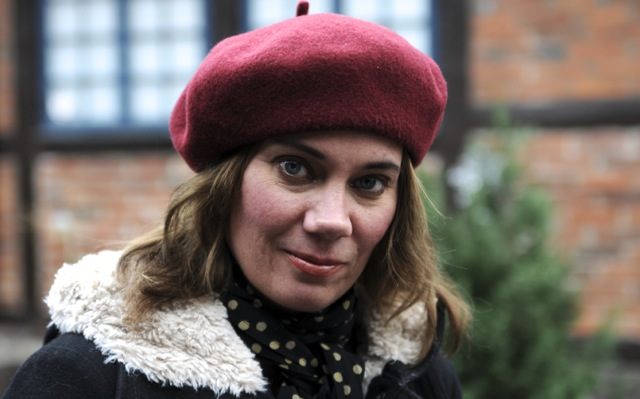
Swedish novelist Gabriella Håkansson

Gabriella Håkansson (born 1968) is a Swedish novelist. Her books are renowned for their psychological originality, complex plots, gothic sense of humour and claustrophobic mapping of the human mind. They have been translated into German, Dutch, Czech, Danish and Norwegian.

== The Aldermann Trilogy ==
2013 saw the publication of the first part of Håkansson's epic trilogy of historic novels, Aldermann's Heir. It is set in early 19th century London. Rich orphan William Aldermann spends his childhood in a huge, neo-classical house, surrounded by a staff of servants as well as old friends of his dead father. The boy soon discovers that he has a deeply troubling heritage: his father was the leader of a mysterious, elitist society of free-thinking radicals.

The second installment, Temple of the Heretics, is due to be published in September, 2014. New Londinium, the final part, will be out in 2019.

A review in English can be found here: http://www.swedishbookreview.com/show-review.php?i=473

An excerpt from Aldermann's Heir (in English) is here: http://www.swedishbookreview.com/article-2014-1-hakansson-gabriella.php

== Additional information ==
Håkansson is also a literary critic and essayist. Her lengthier essays concern writers such as William Beckford, Witold Gombrowicz, Mickey Spillane, Peter Weiss and Jorge Luis Borges. She features regularly in the Swedish news daily Dagens Nyheter, as well as on national public radio.

In 2008 Hakanson was Program Director for the WALTIC International Literary Conference in Stockholm. She now lives in Seved, Malmö.

== Bibliography ==
- Nya Londinium (2019) (New Londinium)
- Kättarnas tempel (2014) (Temple of the Heretics)
- Aldermanns arvinge (2013) (Aldermann's Heir)
- Hjärnmänniskan (2007) (Hearing Voices)
- Fallet Sandemann (2002) (The Sandemann Case)
- Operation B (1997) (Operation B)
