= Gustaf Håkansson =

Swedish competitive cyclist (1885 – 1987)

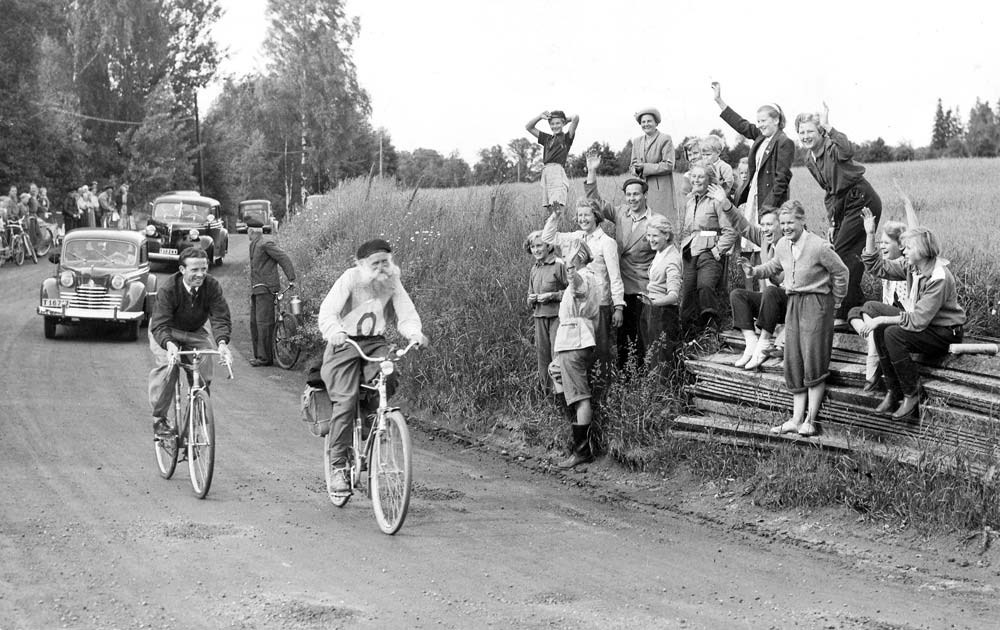
- Håkansson at the 1951 Sverigeloppet
- Born: 15 October 1885; Helsingborg, Sweden
- Died: 9 June 1987 (aged 101); Ekerö Municipality, Sweden
- Occupation: bus driver
- Known for: Sverigeloppet cycling

Nils Gustaf Håkansson (15 October 1885, in Helsingborg – 9 June 1987, in Ekerö, Stockholm) became famous as the Stålfarfar ("Super Grandfather" or "Steel Grandpa" – from the Swedish name for Superman) after cycling the Sverigeloppet, a six-day race covering the length of Sweden, in July 1951, at 66 years of age.

== Life ==
Håkansson was a resident of Gantofta in Helsingborg, where he drove a bus, while his wife Maria had a café. In 1927, at 42 years of age, he conquered the northern Swedish mountains by bicycle.

== Sverigeloppet ==
In 1951, at 66 years of age, Håkansson participated out-of-competition in the 1,764 kilometres (1,096 miles) stage race Sverigeloppet (literally the Sweden Race) from Haparanda to Ystad. The Sverigeloppet (or Sexdagarsloppet - the six-days race) was an annual professional cycling stage race, held between 1924 and 1975. The maximum age for race participants was 40 years, but, nevertheless, he started from Haparanda, formally not among the contestants but starting one minute after the last of them had set off and wearing a bib his wife made, on which she sewed a big red zero as his race number. The Tour was run in stages, and while the contestants slept, Håkansson would pedal up to three days without sleeping. During the contest, he was presented as Stålfarfar, a name that had followed him since the late 1940s. He kept a long flowing white beard that made him look even older, and the organisers were afraid people would laugh at the race participants. Many newspapers were covering his story, and he became famous as the nation followed his journey through the country.

During a few hours off in Söderhamn the police asked him to take a medical exam, which showed that Håkansson was in good health. After 6 days, 14 hours and 20 minutes, he arrived in Ystad - 24 hours before the contestants. There was a parade with a marching band, fire brigades and Håkansson seated on the shoulders of younger men. The next day he had an audience with King Gustaf VI Adolf of Sweden.

== Fame ==
Håkansson was subsequently paid to appear in advertisements, and he toured a long time in the country's folkparks and old-people's homes with his religious songs. He made a record at Liseberg, and became known as the world's oldest recording artist at the time.

In 1959, Håkansson rode his bicycle to Jerusalem to visit the holy sites. His last cycling trips were made after he reached the age of 100 years.

== Death ==
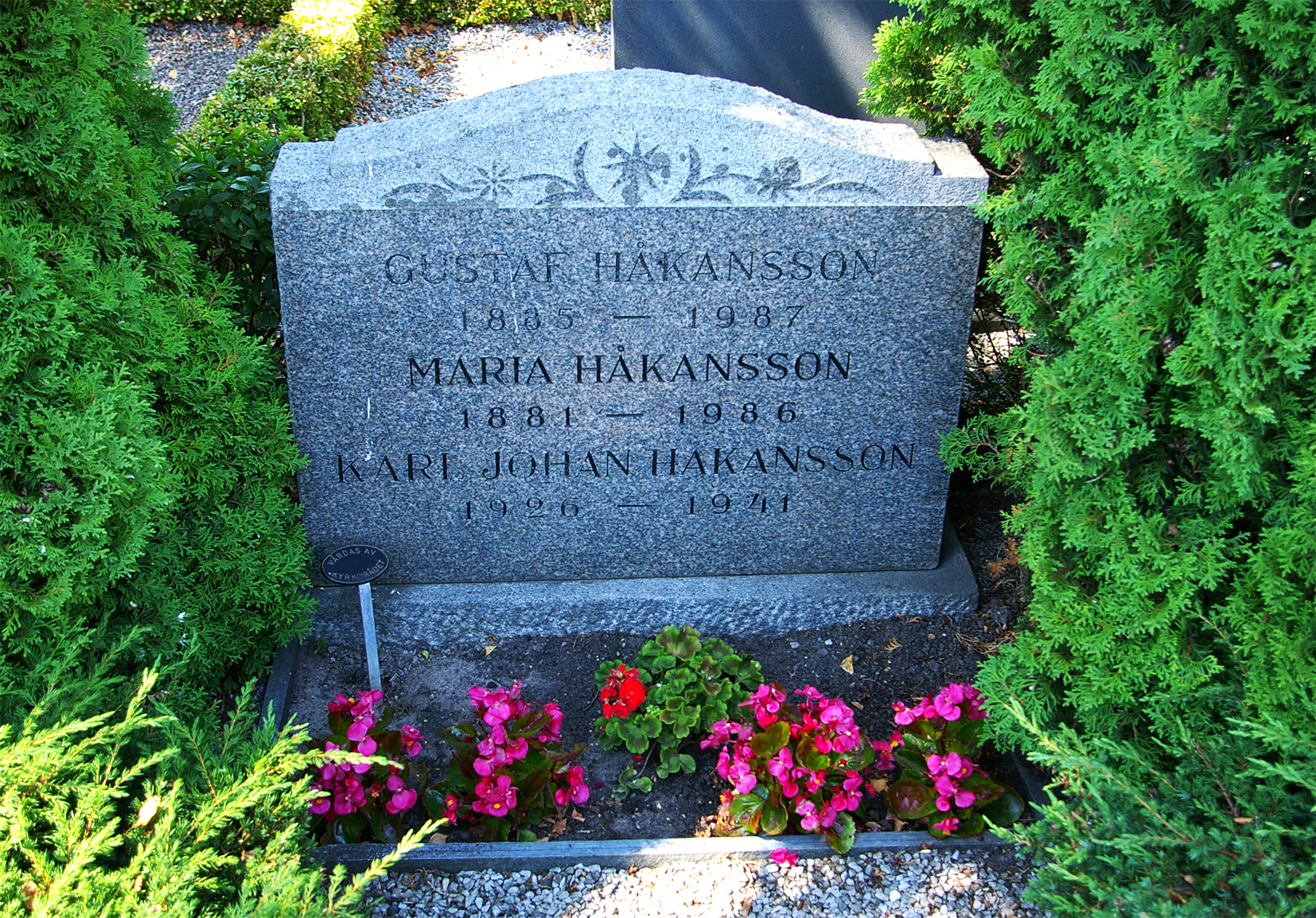
Gustaf and Maria Håkansson's grave by Kvistofta Church

He was almost 102 years old at the time of his death, and his wife Maria, who died a year before Håkansson, almost 105. The couple are buried in the cemetery of Kvistofta Church, together with a son who had died young.

At Johannamuseet in Skurup, Scania there is a permanent exhibition about Stålfarfar.
