= The Celtic Song =

Song by Glen Daly

"The Celtic Song" is the song played over the public address system at Celtic Park, Glasgow when the Scottish football team Celtic run onto the pitch before kick-off. Part of the song is set to an arrangement of part of the tune of "With cat-like tread", from the 1879 Gilbert and Sullivan comic opera The Pirates of Penzance, with lyrics adapted from the American song "Hail, Hail, the Gang's All Here". Another section adopts its tune from "76 Trombones" from The Music Man.

There are many versions of the song. However, the original version, played at Parkhead, was recorded by Glen Daly in 1961. To mark the 50th anniversary of the original release, Shane MacGowan recorded his version in 2011.

Versions of the song are sung by supporters of other clubs around Britain, most notably by Tottenham Hotspur fans (since the 1967 FA Cup Final), fans of Hibernian in Edinburgh, and Everton Fans – "The Everton Song" is a more ribald rendition by the fans of Everton.

== Lyrics ==
Sure it's a grand old team to play for,
Sure it's a grand old team bedad,
When you read its history,
It's enough to make your heart grow sad,
God bless them.

We don't care if we win, lose or draw,
Darn the hair do we care,
Because we only know that there's going to be a show,
And the Glasgow Celtic will be there.

Sure it's the best darn team in Scotland,
And the players all are grand,
We support the Celtic,
As they are the finest in the land we love them,
We'll be there to give the Bhoys a cheer
When the league flag flies,
And it cheers us up when we know the Scottish Cup,
Is coming home to rest at Paradise.

Sure it's a grand old team to play for,
Yes it's a grand old team bedad,
When we read its history,
It's enough to make your heart grow sad,
God bless them.
We don't care if we win lose or draw,
Darn the hair do we care,
Because we only know that there's going to be a show,
And the Glasgow Celtic will be there,
And the Glasgow Celtic will be there.

=== As sung on the terraces (and in pubs) ===
Hail Hail the Celts are here

Hail Hail, the Celts are here,
What the hell do we care,
What the hell do we care,
Hail Hail, the Celts are here,
What the hell do we care now.

For it's a grand old team to play for,
For it's a grand old team to see,
And if you know the history,
It's enough to make your heart go,

We don't care what the animals say,
What the hell do we care,
For all we know,
Is that there's going to be a show,
And the Glasgow Celtic will be there.
