= Deaths in October 1998 =

The following is a list of notable deaths in October 1998.

Entries for each day are listed alphabetically by surname. A typical entry lists information in the following sequence:

- Name, age, country of citizenship at birth, subsequent country of citizenship (if applicable), reason for notability, cause of death (if known), and reference.

== October 1998 ==
=== 1 ===
- Pauline Julien, 70, Quebec singer, songwriter, actress and feminist activist, suicide.
- Steve Knowlton, 76, American Olympic alpine skier (1948).
- Sjur Lindebrække, 89, Norwegian banker and politician.
- Vladimir Ossipoff, 90, Russian-American architect.
- Gabriel Sandu, 45, Romanian football player.

=== 2 ===
- Gene Autry, 91, American Hall of Fame singer ("Back in the Saddle Again", "Rudolph the Red-Nosed Reindeer") and actor (The Gene Autry Show), lymphoma.
- Armando Barrientos, 92, Cuban Olympic fencer (1948).
- Jerzy Bińczycki, 61, Polish stage and film actor, heart attack.
- Jimmy Caesar, 63, American comedian and impressionist.
- DONDI, 37, American graffiti artist, AIDS.
- William J. Eccles, 81, Canadian historian and academic.
- Olin J. Eggen, 79, American astronomer.
- Olivier Gendebien, 74, Belgian racing driver.
- Enrico Pagani, 69, Italian Olympic basketball player (1952).
- Korla Pandit, 77, American composer, pianist, and organist, heart attack.
- Raúl Pini, 75, Uruguayan footballer.
- Raymond Raikes, 88, British theatre producer, director and broadcaster.
- D. French Slaughter Jr., 73, American politician, member of the United States House of Representatives (1985–1991).
- Adrian Spies, 78, American screenwriter.
- Roger Vivier, 90, French women's shoe designer.
- Richard Way, 84, British civil servant and academic administrator.
- Sanjaasürengiin Zorig, 36, Mongolian politician and revolutionary, assassinated.

=== 3 ===
- Hugo Batalla, 72, Uruguayan politician, vice president (1995–1998), lung cancer.
- Arthur Clues, 74, Australian rugby player.
- George Davis, 84, American art director (The Robe, The Diary of Anne Frank, Funny Face), Oscar winner (1954, 1960).
- David C. Evans, 74, American computer scientist.
- Bernard Fox, 81, American figure skater.
- Colin Greenwood, 62, South African rugby player.
- Roddy McDowall, 70, British-American actor (Planet of the Apes, Cleopatra, Fright Night), lung cancer.
- G. S. Venkataraman, 68, Indian botanist.
- Anne-Marie Walters, 75, Swiss-British Special Operations Executive during World War II.
- George Yates, 90, Australian businessman and politician.

=== 4 ===
- S. Arasaratnam, 68, Sri Lankan academic, historian and author.
- Jean-Pascal Delamuraz, 62, Swiss politician.
- Lee Grissom, 90, American baseball player.
- Enea Pavani, 77, Italian curler.
- Tony Shelly, 61, New Zealand racing driver.

=== 5 ===
- João Capucho, 81, Portuguese Olympic sailor (1948).
- Megs Jenkins, 81, English actress.
- Krzysztof Jung, 47, Polish painter, graphic artist and performer, asthma.
- Georges Margot, 96, French Olympic equestrian (1936).
- Pierre Martory, 77, French poet.
- Federico Zeri, 77, Italian art historian.
- Arne Øien, 69, Norwegian economist and politician.

=== 6 ===
- Mark Belanger, 54, American baseball player (Baltimore Orioles, Los Angeles Dodgers), lung cancer.
- Ambrose Burke, 102, English professor and Catholic priest.
- Rolan Bykov, 68, Soviet and Russian actor, theatre and film director and screenwriter, lung cancer.
- Bob Gude, 80, American football player (Chicago Bears, Philadelphia Eagles).
- Jean-François Jenny-Clark, 54, French double bass player, cancer.
- James Larkin, 66, Irish Gaelic football player and politician.
- Samuel Messick, 67, American psychologist.
- Stéphane Morin, 29, Canadian ice hockey player (Quebec Nordiques, Vancouver Canucks), heart problems.
- Joseph J. Sandler, 71, British psychoanalyst.
- Guillaume Tell, 96, French Olympic long-distance runner (1924, 1928).
- Chuck Walton, 57, American gridiron football player (Detroit Lions).
- Jerome Weidman, 85, American playwright and novelist.

=== 7 ===
- Evelyn Daniel Anderson, 72, American educator and disability rights advocate.
- Nellie Carrington, 82, British athlete and Olympian (1936).
- Richard Cyert, 77, American economist and statistician, cancer.
- Cees de Vreugd, 46, Dutch strongman, heart attack.
- W. B. Gallie, 86, Scottish social theorist and philosopher.
- Niilo Hartikka, 89, Finnish Olympic middle-distance runner (1936).
- Arnold Jacobs, 83, American tubist.
- Kjell Sverre Johansen, 54, Norwegian Olympic rower (1972, 1976).
- Renato Malavasi, 94, Italian film actor.
- Joseph P. Merlino, 76, American Party politician.
- Lee Nak-hoon, 62, South Korean actor, heart disease and diabetes.
- Ru Zhijuan, 72, Chinese writer.

=== 8 ===
- Laurențiu Bozeșan, 38, Romanian footballer.
- Curtis Cassell, 85, German-British rabbi.
- Zhang Chongren, 91, Chinese artist and sculptor.
- Mohanlal Lallubhai Dantwala, 89, Indian agricultural economist, academic and writer.
- Jashim, 48, Bangladeshi film actor, producer and freedom fighter, brain haemorrhage.
- Rolf Kestener, 68, Brazilian swimmer and Olympian (1948).
- West Nkosi, 58, South African music producer, saxophonist and songwriter, traffic collision.
- Gigi Reder, 70, Italian character actor.
- Glenn Spearman, 51, American jazz tenor saxophonist, cancer.
- Valerio Vallania, 92, Argentine Olympic athlete (1928).
- Anatol Vieru, 72, Romanian music theoretician, pedagogue, and composer.

=== 9 ===
- Robert Allen, 92, American actor, cancer.
- Anthony Alonzo, 50, Filipino actor, singer, and councilor of Quezon City, skin cancer.
- Beth Bonner, 46, American long-distance runner, traffic collision.
- George Rankin Irwin, 91, American scientist in the field of fracture mechanics and strength of materials.
- Rosario Joanette, 82, Canadian ice hockey player (Montreal Canadiens).
- Ian Johnson, 80, Australian cricketer.
- John Geddes MacGregor, 88, British-American author, scholar, and priest.
- Nagbhushan Patnaik, 63, Indian communist revolutionary and politician.
- Gustavo Petricioli, 70, Mexican economist, heart attack.
- Xiao Yang, 69, Chinese politician.

=== 10 ===
- Clark Clifford, 91, American lawyer and politician.
- Jackie Forster, 71, English news reporter, actress and lesbian rights activist.
- Marvin Gay Sr., 84, American minister and father of Marvin Gaye, pneumonia.
- Pierce Lyden, 90, American actor.
- William Markowitz, 91, American astronomer.
- Tony Marvin, 86, American radio and television announcer.
- Rod Morrison, 73, Canadian ice hockey player (Detroit Red Wings).
- Rachel Cosgrove Payes, 75, American novelist and author.
- Konstantin Petrzhak, 91, Russian nuclear physicist.
- Tommy Quaid, 41, Irish hurler, injuries sustained from a fall.
- Berta Rahm, 88, Swiss architect, writer and feminist activist.
- Strick Shofner, 79, American baseball player (Boston Red Sox).
- Rocco Spinola, 67, Italian Olympic weightlifter (1960).
- El Tappe, 71, American baseball player (Chicago Cubs), and coach, cancer.

=== 11 ===
- George Bain, 68–69, Australian rugby league footballer.
- Richard Denning, 84, American actor, heart attack.
- Fred Harris, 86, English footballer.
- Lars Theodor Jonsson, 94, Swedish cross-country skier and Olympian (1928).
- Michael Wynn, 7th Baron Newborough, 81, British peer and Royal Naval Volunteer Reserve officer.
- Spottswood William Robinson III, 82, American civil rights attorney and US Circuit Judge.
- Gaius Shaver, 88, American football player and Olympian (1932).

=== 12 ===
- Jürgen Aschoff, 85, German physician, biologist and behavioral physiologist.
- Mario Beaulieu, 68, Canadian politician, member of the Senate of Canada (1990–1994).
- Valdemar Kendzior, 72, Danish footballer.
- Bernhard Minetti, 93, German actor.
- Julio Saraceni, 86, Argentine film director.
- Ineko Sata, 94, Japanese author and communist.
- Matthew Shepard, 21, American murder victim, beaten to death.
- Wilson Allen Wallis, 85, American economist and statistician.

=== 13 ===
- Thomas Byberg, 82, Norwegian speed skater and Olympic medalist (1948).
- Dmitry Filippov, 54, Soviet and Russian politician and industrialist, assassinated.
- P. T. Narasimhachar, 93, Indian Kannada playwright and poet.
- Bojan Pečar, 38, Serbian/Yugoslav musician, heart attack.
- Jeremy Vargas Sagastegui, 27, American criminal, execution by lethal injection.
- Gérard Charles Édouard Thériault, 66, Canadian pilot and Chief of the Defence Staff.

=== 14 ===
- Cleveland Amory, 81, American author, reporter and animal rights activist, abdominal aortic aneurysm.
- Leopoldina Bălănuță, 63, Romanian actress.
- Dasarath Deb, 82, Indian communist politician.
- Hipólito Gil, 94, Argentine Olympic sailor (1936).
- Betty Gillies, 90, American aviation pioneer.
- Giorgio Oberweger, 84, Italian discus thrower and Olympic medalist (1936, 1948).
- Frankie Yankovic, 83, American polka musician, heart failure.

=== 15 ===
- Rolf Agop, 90, German conductor and academic.
- Colette Darfeuil, 92, French actress.
- Mãe Cleusa Millet, 75, Brazilian physician and spiritual leader.
- Molly O'Day, 88, American actress, she became one of the WAMPAS Baby Stars in 1928, she received a star in the Motion Pictures category on the Hollywood Walk of Fame in 1960
- Ike Owens, 79, Welsh rugby player.
- Iain Crichton Smith, 70, Scottish poet and novelist.

=== 16 ===
- Carlos Aldabe, 79, Argentine football player and coach.
- Frank Carswell, 78, American baseball player (Detroit Tigers), and manager.
- Jon Postel, 55, American computer scientist, complications from heart surgery.
- Collins J. Seitz, 84, American lawyer and judge.
- Joseph Stamler, 86, American lawyer and judge.
- Léontine Stevens, 91, Belgian Olympic athlete (1928).
- M. Vasalis, 89, Dutch poet and psychiatrist.

=== 17 ===
- Antonio Agri, 66, Argentine musician, cancer.
- Germán List Arzubide, 100, Mexican poet and revolutionary.
- Brian Dickson, 82, Canadian military officer and judge.
- Muhammad Abdullah Ghazi, 63, Pakistani religious leader, shot.
- Joan Hickson, 92, English actress (Miss Marple).
- Carmen Molina, 78, Mexican actress, singer, and dancer.
- Hakim Said, 78, Pakistani scholar and philanthropist, murdered.
- Tron, 26, German hacker and phreaker, suicide by hanging.
- Karel Vohralík, 53, Czech Olympic ice hockey player (1972).

=== 18 ===
- Frédéric Fitting, 96, Swiss Olympic fencer (1920, 1924, 1928, 1936).
- Peter A. Griffin, 61, American mathematician, author, and blackjack expert.
- Alfred Praks, 96, Estonian Olympic wrestler (1924, 1928).
- Dick Sheppard, 53, English footballer.
- George Shaw Wheeler, 90, American advisor to President Franklin Delano Roosevelt and defector.

=== 19 ===
- Arnold M. Auerbach, 86, American comedy writer.
- Frank J. Brasco, 66, American politician, member of the United States House of Representatives, (1967–1975).
- Tommy Burks, 58, American farmer and politician, murdered.
- Chaduranga, 82, Indian Kannada writer.
- Edward Flannery, 86, American Roman Catholic priest and author, pancreatic cancer.
- Fritz Honka, 63, German serial killer.
- Charlton Ogburn, 87, American journalist and author, suicide.
- Compton I. White Jr., 77, American politician, member of the United States House of Representatives (1963–1967).

=== 20 ===
- Anni Bruk, 74, Austrian Olympic shot putter (1948).
- John Mowbray Didcott, 67, South African lawyer and judge, cancer.
- Frank Gillard, 89, British BBC reporter and radio pioneer.
- Gerhard Jahn, 71, German politician, cancer.
- Spike Nelson, 92, American football player and coach.
- René Pleimelding, 73, French football player and manager.

=== 21 ===
- Marcel Bellefeuille, 57, Canadian Olympic boxer (1960).
- Josef Bremm, 84, Nazi Germany Wehrmacht officer.
- Scott Brower, 34, American ice hockey player, traffic collision.
- Alexander Cairncross, 87, British economist.
- Cheng Lianzhen, 77, Chinese politician and bandit leader.
- Phil Haugstad, 74, American baseball player (Brooklyn Dodgers, Cincinnati Reds).
- John Hazen, 71, American basketball player (Boston Celtics).
- John David Kelly, 64, American circuit judge (United States Court of Appeals for the Eighth Circuit).
- Nicholas Kemmer, 86, Russian-British nuclear physicist.
- David Sutherland Nelson, 64, American district judge (United States District Court for the District of Massachusetts).
- Hans Alfred Nieper, 70, German alternative medicine practitioner.
- Alan Sainsbury, Baron Sainsbury, 96, British businessman.
- Tatiana Tolmacheva, 91, Soviet figure skater and figure skating coach.

=== 22 ===
- Nathalia Crane, 85, American poet and novelist.
- Burton M. Cross, 95, American businessman, politician and governor.
- Ajit Khan, 76, Indian actor.
- Adolf Odermatt, 74, Swiss Olympic alpine skier (1948).
- Violet Owen, 96, British tennis and hockey player.
- Ángel Picazo, 81, Spanish film actor, cancer.
- Francis W. Sargent, 83, American politician and governor.
- Paul Vittet, 65, Swiss Olympic sports shooter (1968, 1972).

=== 23 ===
- Eric Ambler, 89, English thriller author.
- Noel Carroll, 56, Irish middle-distance runner and Olympian (1964, 1968), heart attack.
- Christopher Gable, 58, English ballet dancer, choreographer and actor, cancer.
- Adrian Gonzales, 60–61, Filipino comic artist (All-Star Squadron, Arak, Son of Thunder, Super Powers).
- Winnie Ruth Judd, 93, American convicted murderer.
- Eero Laine, 72, Finnish Olympic biathlete (1960).
- Zangeres Zonder Naam, 79, Dutch levenslied singer, heart attack.
- Barnett Slepian, 52, American physician, homicide.
- Silviu Stănculescu, 66, Romanian actor, leukemia.

=== 24 ===
- Rafael Alonso, 78, Spanish actor.
- Dennis Ayling, 81, British cinematographer.
- Charles Barnes, 96, Australian politician.
- Mary Calderone, 94, American physician and sexual education advocate.
- Pino Dordoni, 72, Italian race walker and Olympic champion (1948, 1952, 1956, 1960).
- Peter Fazer, 64, Finnish Olympic sailor (1964).
- Ardalion Ignatyev, 67, Soviet track and field athlete and Olympic medalist (1952, 1956).

=== 25 ===
- Geoffrey Clough Ainsworth, 93, British mycologist and scientific historian.
- Robin Brook, 90, British banker and Olympic fencer (1936, 1948).
- Geoff Crain, 67, Canadian football player.
- Dick Higgins, 60, American artist, composer, poet, and publisher, heart attack.
- John Hyland, 86, United States Navy admiral.
- Gavriil Malysh, 91, Soviet and Russian painter, watercolorist and graphic artist.
- Jesús Olmos, 88, Mexican Olympic basketball player (1936).
- Susan Strange, 75, British scholar and political scientist.
- Warren Wiebe, 45, American vocalist and session musician, suicide.
- Fouad Yazgi, 66, Egyptian Olympic sprinter (1952).

=== 26 ===
- Nicholas Budgen, 60, British politician, liver cancer.
- Rick Dior, 51, American sound engineer (Apollo 13, Dirty Dancing, Ransom), Oscar winner (1996), heart attack.
- Kenkichi Iwasawa, 81, Japanese mathematician.
- Margaret Keay, 87, British phytopathologist.
- José Cardoso Pires, 73, Portuguese author.
- Hugh David Stevenson, 80, Royal Australian Navy officer.
- Terry Thomas, 45, American basketball player (Detroit Pistons).
- Selvarajan Yesudian, 82, Swiss yogi and author.

=== 27 ===
- O'Neal Adams, 79, American football player (New York Giants, Brooklyn Dodgers).
- Alfred Gray, 59, American mathematician, heart attack.
- Rosamund John, 85, English film and stage actress.
- Reidar Kvammen, 84, Norwegian footballer and Olympian (1936).
- Daniel Pedoe, 87, English mathematician and geometer.
- Luis Prendes, 85, Spanish actor, cancer.
- Bev Scott, 84, Australian Olympic wrestler (1952).
- Gene Taylor, 70, American politician, member of the United States House of Representatives (1979–1989).
- Klári Tolnay, 84, Hungarian actress.
- Winnie van Weerdenburg, 52, Dutch swimmer and Olympic medalist (1964).

=== 28 ===
- Ghulam Ahmed, 76, Indian cricket player.
- Cuthbert Alport, Baron Alport, 86, British politician, minister and life peer.
- Sherman Block, 74, American politician and sheriff.
- James L. Day, 73, United States Marine Corps major general.
- Tommy Flowers, 92, English engineer and electronic computing pioneer.
- James Goldman, 71, American screenwriter (The Lion in Winter, Nicholas and Alexandria) and playwright (Follies), Oscar winner (1969), heart attack.
- Ted Hughes, 68, English poet and children's writer, heart attack.
- Margaret Marley Modlin, 71, American painter, sculptor and photographer.
- Wang Shuming, 92, Chinese airforce colonel general.

=== 29 ===
- Anthony J. Celebrezze, 88, American politician.
- Alvin M. Johnston, 84, American jet-age test pilot, Alzheimer's disease.
- Gilda Lousek, 60, Argentine actress.
- Paul Misraki, 90, French composer of music and film scores.
- Harry Weese, 83, American architect, stroke.

=== 30 ===
- Vishram Bedekar, 92, Indian writer and movie director.
- Guido De Santi, 75, Italian racing cyclist.
- Frank Deveney, 88, Australian cricketer.
- Lee Parsons Gagliardi, 80, American district judge (United States District Court for the Southern District of New York).
- Apo Lazaridès, 73, French cyclist.
- Verdell Mathis, 83, American baseball player.
- George Schmees, 74, American baseball player (St. Louis Browns, Boston Red Sox).
- Bulldog Turner, 79, American football player (Chicago Bears), and coach.
- Lam Van Phat, Army of the Republic of Vietnam officer.
- Elmer Vasko, 62, Canadian ice hockey player (Chicago Blackhawks, Minnesota North Stars).
- Heinz Westphal, 74, German politician.

=== 31 ===
- Régis Charlet, 79, French Olympic ski jumper (1948).
- Kenneth Darling, 89, British Army general.
- María de la Purísima de la Cruz, 72, Spanish Roman Catholic nun.
- Bernard J. Dwyer, 77, American Democratic Party politician, heart attack.
- Vera Ellery, 72, British Olympic swimmer (1948).
- Oupa Mafokate, 27, South African musician.
- Vassar Miller, 74, American writer and poet.
- Noah Mullins, 80, American gridiron football player (Chicago Bears, New York Giants).
- Bodil Russ, 90, Norwegian Olympic equestrian (1956).
- Lou Rymkus, 78, American football player (Washington Redskins, Cleveland Browns), and coach, stroke.
- Bob Thurman, 81, American baseball player (Cincinnati Redlegs).
- Oiva Timonen, 78, Finnish Olympic wrestler (1952).

== Sources ==
- Liebman, Roy (2000). The Wampas Baby Stars: A Biographical Dictionary, 1922–1934. Jefferson, North Carolina: McFarland. ISBN 0-7864-0756-5.
