= Nancy Harkness Love =

American aviator (1914–1976)

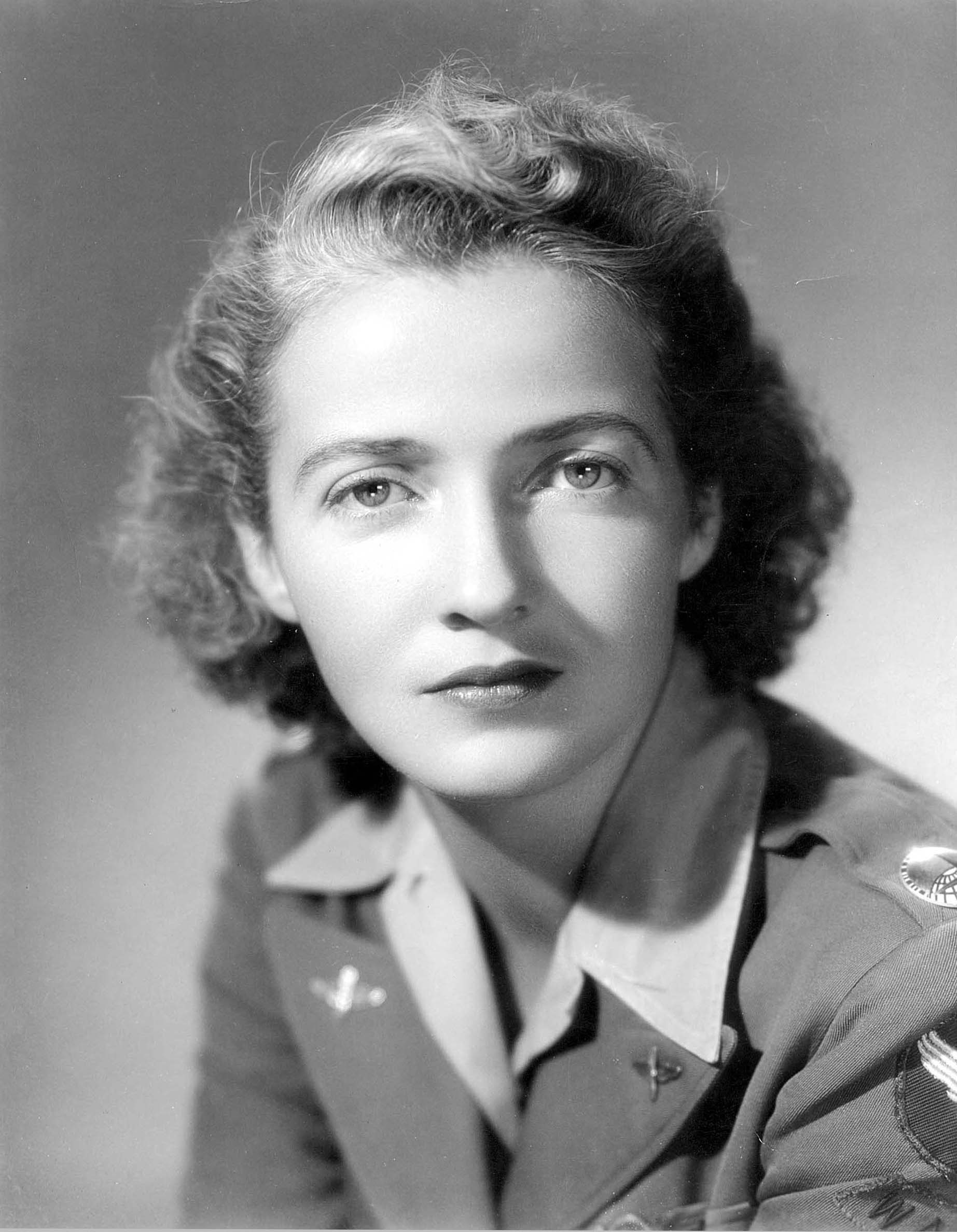
- Nancy H. Love, c. 1943
- Born: Hannah Lincoln Harkness; February 14, 1914; Houghton, Michigan
- Died: October 22, 1976 (aged 62); Martha's Vineyard, Massachusetts
- Occupations: Aviator; Test Pilot; Spokesperson; Air Force Officer (Rank of Lieutenant Colonel)
- Spouse: Robert Love

Nancy Harkness Love (February 14, 1914 – October 22, 1976), born Hannah Lincoln Harkness, was an American pilot and airplane commander during World War II. She earned her pilot's license at age 16. She worked as a test pilot and air racer in the 1930s. During World War II she convinced Colonel William H. Tunner of the U.S. Army Air Forces to look to set up a group of female pilots to ferry aircraft from factories to air bases. This proposal was eventually approved as the Women's Auxiliary Ferrying Squadron. Love commanded this unit and later all ferrying operations in the newly formed Women Airforce Service Pilots. She was awarded the Air Medal for her work during the war and was appointed lieutenant colonel in the US Air Force Reserve in 1948.

== Early life ==
Born in Houghton, Michigan on February 14, 1914, as the daughter of a wealthy physician, Harkness developed an intense interest in aviation at an early age. At 16, she took her first flight and earned her pilot's license within a month. Although she went to prestigious schools, including Milton Academy in Massachusetts and Vassar in New York, she was restless and adventurous. In 1932, by the end of her freshman year, dubbed, "The Flying Freshman!", she earned her commercial license and received national attention. At Vassar, she earned extra money taking students for rides in an aircraft she rented from a nearby airport.

=== Pre-war ===
In 1936, Harkness married Robert M. Love, an Air Corps Reserve major. They built their own successful Boston-based aviation company, Inter City Aviation, for which Nancy was a pilot. She also flew for the Bureau of Air Commerce. Love entered air races in 1936 and 1937, competing in the National Air Races in Los Angeles and Detroit. After finishing second in the Detroit race, she stopped competing. In 1937 and 1938, Love worked as a test pilot, alongside famous air racer Frank Hawks, for the Gwinn Air Car Company, performing tests on various aircraft modifications and innovations. In one project, she served as a test pilot on the new tricycle landing gear, which subsequently became standard on most aircraft. In another project, she helped mark water towers with town names as a navigational aid for pilots.

In May 1940, after World War II broke out in Europe, Love wrote to Lt. Col. Robert Olds, then in the Plans Division of US Air Corps Headquarters, who a year later would be in charge of establishing the Air Corps Ferrying Command, that she had found 49 excellent women pilots. This group called "the originals" each had more than 1,000 flying hours. She proposed that the women could help transport aircraft from factories to bases. Olds submitted a plan for integrating civilian female pilots in the Ferrying Command to Gen. Hap Arnold, commanding general of the United States Army Air Forces, who turned it down after Jacqueline Cochran extracted a promise from him not to act on any proposal regarding women pilots that did not make them commissioned officers commanded by women.

== World War II ==
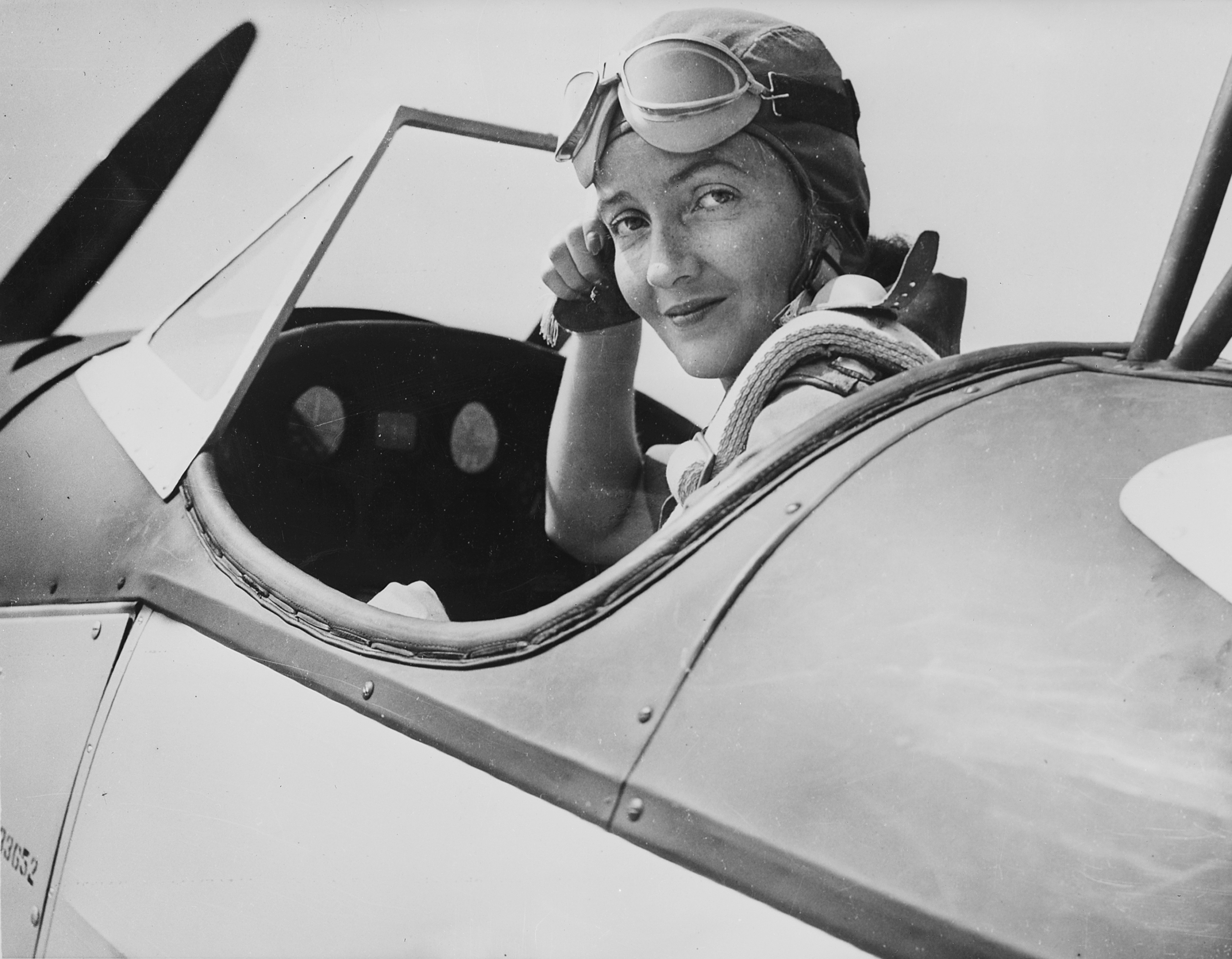
Love, 28 at the controls of a Fairchild PT-19

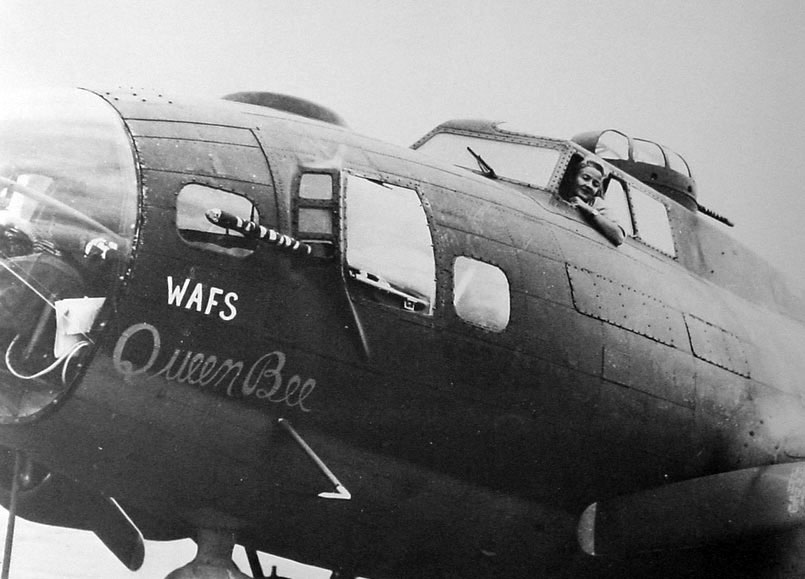
Nancy Love at the controls of a Boeing B-17 Flying Fortress "Queen Bee".

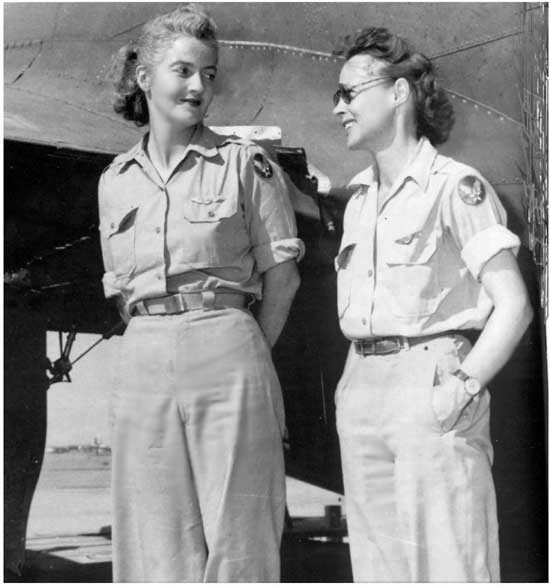
Nancy Love, pilot (left), and Betty (Huyler) Gillies, co-pilot, the first women to fly the Boeing B-17 Flying Fortress heavy bomber. The two WAFS were set to ferry a B-17 named "Queen Bee" to England when their flight was canceled by General Hap Arnold.

In early 1942, her husband Robert Love was called to active duty in the Munitions Building, Washington, D. C. as the deputy chief of staff of the Ferrying Command. Love accompanied him to Washington and on March 11, took a civil service position in Baltimore, Maryland with the Operations Office of the Ferrying Command's Northeast Sector (soon redesignated 2nd Ferrying Group), Domestic Division. The Domestic Division, commanded by Col. William H. Tunner, was designated Ferrying Division, Air Transport Command (ATC) a few months later.

Love piloted her own aircraft on her daily commute from the couple's home in Washington, D. C. The offices of Major Love and Col. Tunner were near each other, and during a conversation between them, her piloting skills caught the attention of Tunner, who was scouring the country for skilled pilots to deliver aircraft from factories to fields. Major Love suggested Tunner speak to his wife directly.

Love convinced Tunner that the idea of using experienced women pilots to supplement the existing pilot force was a good one. He then asked her to write up a proposal for a women's ferrying division. When his recommendation that she (and the other female pilots) be commissioned into the Women's Army Corps (WAAC) was denied, he appointed her to his staff as Executive of Women's Pilots. Within a few months, she had recruited 30 experienced female pilots to join the newly created Women's Auxiliary Ferrying Squadron (WAFS); 28 graduated from training. Love became their commander. In September 1942, the women pilots began flying from New Castle Army Air Field, Wilmington, Delaware, under the auspices of the 2nd Ferrying Group.

By June 1943, Love was commanding four different squadrons of WAFS at Love Field, Texas; New Castle, Delaware; Romulus, Michigan and Long Beach, California. The WAFS' number had greatly increased because of the addition of graduates of the Women's Flying Training Detachment (WFTD) at Avenger Field, Sweetwater, Texas, an organization championed and headed by Jacqueline Cochran.

On August 5, 1943, the WAFS merged with the WFTD and became a single entity: the Women Airforce Service Pilots (WASP). Love was named the executive for all WASP ferrying operations. Under her command, female pilots flew almost every type military aircraft then in the Army Air Forces' inventory, and their record of achievement proved remarkable. Love was certified in 19 military aircraft, becoming the first woman to be certified to fly the latest military aircraft, including the Douglas C-54 Skymaster, North American B-25 Mitchell, and along with Betty Gillies, the first to fly the Boeing B-17 Flying Fortress. In Dallas, Love was also checked out on the North American P-51 Mustang, the USAAF's "hottest" fighter.

In 1944, after the WASPs were disbanded, Love continued to work on reports detailing the work of the Air Transport Command.

== Post-war ==
At the end of the war, Love and her husband had the unique distinction of being decorated simultaneously. He received the Distinguished Service Medal, and she the Air Medal for her "Operational leadership in the successful training and assignment of over 300 qualified women fliers in the flying of advanced military aircraft."

After the war, Love had three daughters, but she continued as an aviation industry leader, as well as a champion for recognition as military veterans for the women who had served as WASPs. In 1948, after the creation of the United States Air Force, she was given the rank of lieutenant colonel in the U.S. Air Force Reserve.

Love died of cancer at the age of 62 in 1976, so she did not live to see the WASPs being accorded military recognition three years later.

== Legacy ==
Love was posthumously inducted into the Airlift/Tanker Association's Hall of Fame in 1996, the Michigan Women's Hall of Fame in 1997, and the National Aviation Hall of Fame in Dayton, Ohio in 2005. A statue dedicated to Nancy Harkness Love is at the New Castle County Airport in Delaware.

== See also ==
- Women Airforce Service Pilots Badge
- Women's Auxiliary Air Force (WAAF – British)
- Air Transport Auxiliary (British military aircraft ferry service, had many female pilots)
- Women's Army Corps (WAC)
- WAVES – WWII Women's Navy Branch
- SPARS – Women's branch of the U.S. Coast Guard Reserve during WWII
- Ladies Courageous – 1944 film by John Rawlins

== Bibliography ==
- Haynsworth, Leslie and David Toomey. Amelia Earhart's Daughters. New York: William Morrow and Company, 1998. ISBN 978-0-68815-233-8.
- Koppes, Clayton R. and Gregory D. Black. Hollywood Goes to War: How Politics, Profits and Propaganda Shaped World War II Movies. New York: The Free Press, 1987. ISBN 0-02-903550-3.
- Merryman Molly. Clipped Wings: The Rise and Fall of the Women Airforce Service Pilots (WASPS) of World War II. New York: New York University Press, 2001. ISBN 978-0-81475-568-6.
- Orriss, Bruce. When Hollywood Ruled the Skies: The Aviation Film Classics of World War II. Hawthorne, California: Aero Associates Inc., 1984. ISBN 0-9613088-0-X.
- Rickman, Sarah Byrn. Nancy Love and the WASP Ferry Pilots of World War II. Denton, Texas: University of North Texas Press, 2008. ISBN 978-1-57441-241-3.
- Stewart-Smith, Lt. Col. Natalie J. The Women Airforce Service Pilots of World War II: Perspectives on the Work of America's First Military Women Aviators. Pullman, Washington: Washington State University, 1981.
