= Arthur Mafokate =

- Also known as: King of Kwaito
- Born: July 10, 1969 (age 57); Soweto, Gauteng, South Africa
- Genre: Kwaito
- Occupations: singer; songwriter; producer
- Instrument: Vocals
- Years active: 1994–present
- Label: 999 Music Label

Arthur Mafokate (born 10 July 1969) is a South African kwaito musician and producer. In 1994, he released his debut album, Windy Windy, which included the hit "Amagents Ayaphanda". He became known as the "King of Kwaito" with many hit singles such as Kaffir, Oyi Oyi, Mnike, Twalatza, Zombo, Koti Koti, Poppe Dans, Seven Phezulu & Sika Lekhekhe.

== Early life and career ==
Sello Arthur Mafokate was born on 10 July 1969. He is the son of Olympic equestrian and philanthropist Enos Mafokate and the brother of the late kwaito star Oupa Makhendlas Mafokate. He was born in Soweto, Gauteng Province, but his family later moved to Midrand. As a child, he took piano lessons, and had a keen interest in soccer, dance and music.

Mafokate worked as a model, winning the title 'Mr Soweto' in 1992. He worked as a music producer and sound engineer for several popular South African artists.

In the late 1980s and early 1990s, Mafokate was part of a trio called Out of Control, and a duo called Q-Face. He was also involved with the groups Heaven, Twin Prestige and Helela. In 1994, he established himself as a kwaito artist with the release of the album Windy Windy on CCP Records, with lead tracks "Ayaphanda" and "Where's The Bass".

He became a backing dancer for artists including Brenda Fassie, Monwa & Son and Johnny Mokhali.

=== First Kwaito hit ===
In 1995 he released the first kwaito hit, "Kaffir", from his self-titled EP, which sold over 500,000 copies. Its lyrics discuss the new freedoms that emerged after the political changes of 1994, including the implementation of a new constitution and democratic election system. The title refers to a derogatory term used in South Africa as a racial slur against black people.

At the 2021 Mzansi Kwaito and House Music Awards, his single "Hlokoloza" received a nomination for Best Kwaito song.

=== Contributions to Kwaito and 999 Record Label ===
Over the course of his career, Mafokate introduced dance styles such as twalatsa and qopetsa. He founded his own record label, 999, alongside Joe Nina, and released the albums Blenda Fashion (1994) and Zama Zama Yo! (1995) under the name Bambezela, after which he went by Arthur. As a mixer and sound engineer, he used the alias 'Mix Maestro'.

Notable artists signed to 999 included Hip Hop Pantsula, Zombo, and Lira.

Mafokate also presented the television show Ezimtoti in 2001.

== Awards ==
In 1998 Mafokate won the Song of the Year for his song 'Oyi Oyi' at the South African Music Awards (SAMA), the first artist to win this category as voted for by the public.

He was recognised for his contribution to music at the 2007 FNB South African Music Awards, and won the Lifetime Achievement Award at the 2016 South African Metro FM Music Awards.

== Controversy ==
=== Assault allegations ===
In 2017, the artist Cici, who was then Mafokate's partner and signed to his label, accused him of physical abuse during the time they were living together. Cici had a serious injury and had to be treated in a hospital. He was arrested and released on bail pending a court case. After Cici posted images showing the injuries she sustained, widespread condemnation of Mafokate led to the cancellation of the 100MenMarch, a march to highlight gender based violence. Mafokate denied all allegations, and was found not guilty by Midrand Magistrate court in 2019.

=== Allegations of unlawful enrichment at SAMRO ===
After his removal in 2018 as a board member, in 2019 the Southern African Music Rights Organisation (SAMRO) sued Mafokate for unlawful enrichment. According to the lawsuit, Mafokate and a number of other members of the leadership of SAMRO overpaid themselves by more than R1.6 million rand. Mafokate himself was allegedly irregularly overpaid by R84 000.

SAMRO later become the centre of a scandal regarding the underpayment of royalties to artists, much of which took place during Mafokate's time working for the organisation.

=== Misappropriation of lottery funds ===
On 13 January 2023, Mafokate was alleged to be involved in the misappropriation of R56m in community development funds from the National Lotteries Commission. The Special Investigating Unit (SIU) obtained a preservation order to freeze a plot, a farm and three luxury properties linked to the alleged corruption, valued at R53m, one of which belonged to Mafokate.

== Personal life ==
Arthur Mafokate has four children, A.J Mafokate and Owami Mafokate, Onalenna Mafokate and Kelello Mafokate who are both in the entertainment industry. Owami's mother is Queen Sisoko and was a lead member of the group Abashante, which was signed to Mofokate's 999 record label.

== Discography ==
=== Albums ===
Year	Title
1994	Windy Windy
1994	Scamtho
1995	Kaffir
1996	Die Poppe Sal Dans
1997	Oyi Oyi
1998	Chomi
1999	Umpostoli
1999	Yiyo
1999	Inja EP
2000	Mnike
2001	Seven Phezelu
2002	Haai Bo
2003	Skulwyt
2004	Mamarela
2005	Sika
2006	Vanilla and Chocolate
2007	Dankie
2007	Arthur vs DJ Mbuso: Round 1
2008	Kwaito Meets House
2011	Hlokoloza
2013	Kommander
