= Betty Gillies =

American aviator

Betty Huyler Gillies
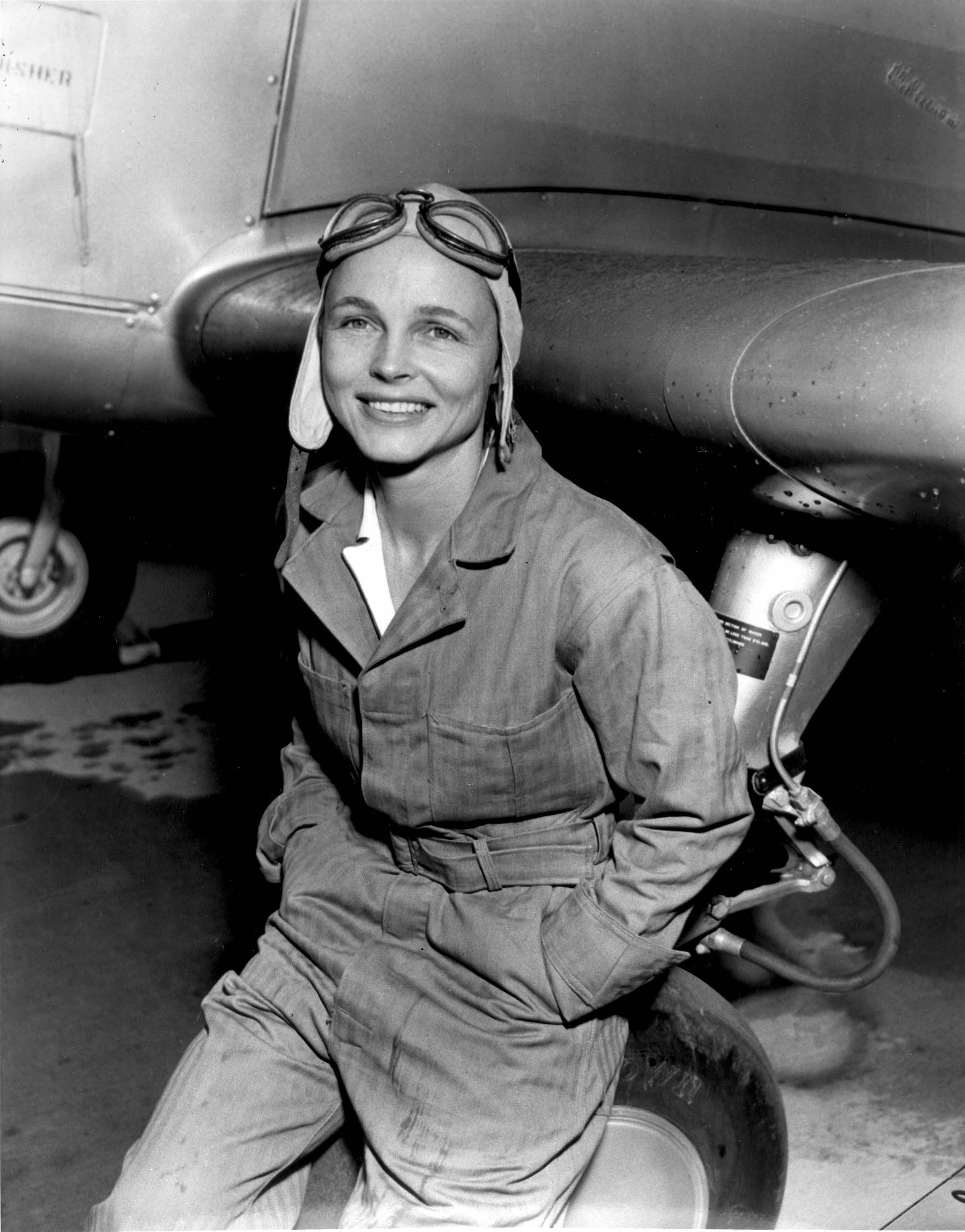
- Born: January 7, 1908; Syosset, Long Island, New York
- Died: October 14, 1998 (aged 90); San Diego, California
- Occupations: Aviator; Spokesperson
- Spouse: Brewster Allison "Bud" Gillies

Betty Gillies (January 7, 1908 – October 14, 1998) was an American aviator, and the first pilot to qualify for the Women's Auxiliary Ferrying Squadron, later amalgamated into the Women Airforce Service Pilots.

== Early life ==
Betty Huyler was born in 1908 to a relatively prosperous family on Long Island. She began flying in 1928 when she was a student nurse at Presbyterian Hospital in New York City and on May 6, 1929, after a total of 23 hours of flying time, including instruction, obtained license #6525.

Huyler immediately began building time toward a commercial license and when it was formed in November 1929, she joined The Ninety-Nines, an international organization of women flyers, first led by pioneer woman flyer Amelia Earhart. The name of the group was chosen because 99 women were present for the first meeting, including Huyler. Between 1939 and 1941, she was the president of the 99s and led the fight against the Civil Aeronautics Authority (CAA) over the prohibition for women to fly during pregnancy. She later owned and flew a Grumman Widgeon amphibian.

In 1930, Huyler was married to Brewster Allison "Bud" Gillies, a vice president of Grumman Aircraft Corporation.

== World War II ==
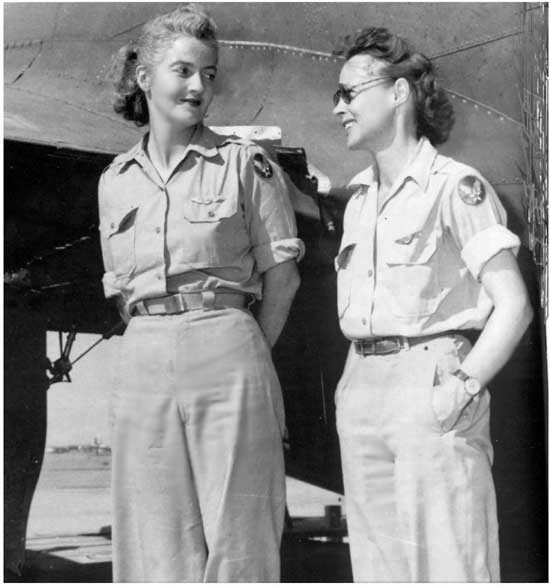
Nancy Love, pilot (left), and Betty Gillies (right), co-pilot, the first women to fly the Boeing B-17 Flying Fortress heavy bomber. The two WAFS were set to ferry a B-17 named "Queen Bee" to England when their flight was canceled by General Hap Arnold.

In 1942, Gillies was the first pilot to qualify for the Women's Auxiliary Ferrying Squadron. She entered the WAFS on September 12, 1942. At this time, she had amassed 14 years of flying experience, running up a total of 1,400 flying hours to her credit and held various aeronautical ratings.

When Nancy Love transferred to Love Field, Dallas, Texas to start a new WAFS ferrying unit, Gillies was made squadron leader of the WAFS assigned to the 2nd Ferrying Group, New Castle Army Air Base, Wilmington, Delaware.

In early March 1943, Gillies became the first woman to fly the Republic P-47 Thunderbolt when she was checked out on the aircraft at Wilmington. The "check out" consisted of an explanation of aircraft systems, flight characteristics and emergency procedures. (Note: Since the P-47 Gillies was checking out, was a single-seat aircraft, her first flight in the type was also her first solo flight.)

One of the outstanding ferry missions accomplished by the original Squadron at Wilmington came in April 1943, when four Fairchild PT-26s were delivered from Hagerstown, Maryland, to DeWinton, Alberta, Canada, a distance of more than 2,500 miles. Gillies was flight leader, and the other three pilots were Nancy Batson, Helen McGilvery and Kathryn Bernheim. The type of aircraft flown had a cruising speed of only around 100 mph.

The group left Hagerstown on April 18, spent the night at Joliet, Illinois (697 miles away), spent the next night at North Platte, Nebraska, after a run of 585 miles, then made a long hop of 846 miles to Great Falls, Montana. On April 21 they flew the remaining 275 miles to DeWinton, Alberta. All four pilots were back at the 2nd Group by Friday evening, April 23, and were commended by Colonel Baker for their efficient and prompt delivery, which included not only the flying of the aircraft but also the paperwork involved in such deliveries, such as flight logs, gasoline reports and RON (remain over night) messages.

On August 15, 1943, Love and Gillies qualified as first pilots (aircraft commanders) on Boeing B-17s and made three deliveries together during the balance of the month. On September 2, 1943 Gillies and Nancy Love departed Cincinnati on a ferry mission to deliver a B-17F to England; however, the mission was canceled before the aircraft left Goose Bay, Labrador.

Gillies remained squadron leader of the Women Airforce Service Pilots assigned to the 2nd Ferrying Group at New Castle Army Air Base until the WASPs were disbanded on December 20, 1944.

Betty and her husband Bud Gillies, had three children. One of her children died at age 4; her remaining son and daughter became commercial pilots, and four of her grandchildren become pilots as well.

== Postwar ==
After World War II, Gillies was a ham radio operator who, using her radio, connected phone calls to ships in the Pacific from her home in California. She had her huge antenna directed at the Antarctic and maintained contact with the staff and Navy personnel in Operation Deep Freeze who were stationed there for two year hitches. She also participated in the Navy MARS program under the call sign NNN0AYT.

Staying connected to aviation, Gillies was the Chair of the All Woman Transcontinental Air Race (AWTAR) from 1953–1961.

In 1964, Gillies was appointed by President Lyndon B. Johnson as the first Federal Aviation Administration Women's Advisory Committee. She died in 1998.

== Awards and honors ==
Gillies Received a Paul Tissandier Diploma from the Federation Aeronautique Internationale in 1977 and the National Aeronautic Association Elder Statesman of Aviation Award in 1982. The Gillies Rock was named after.

== See also ==
- Women Airforce Service Pilots (WASP)
- Women Airforce Service Pilots Badge
- Women's Auxiliary Air Force (WAAF - British)
- Women's Army Corps (WAC)
- WAVES
- SPARS
- United States Army Air Forces
- Abandoned & Little-Known Airfields
