= William H. Tunner =

United States Air Force general (1906–1983)

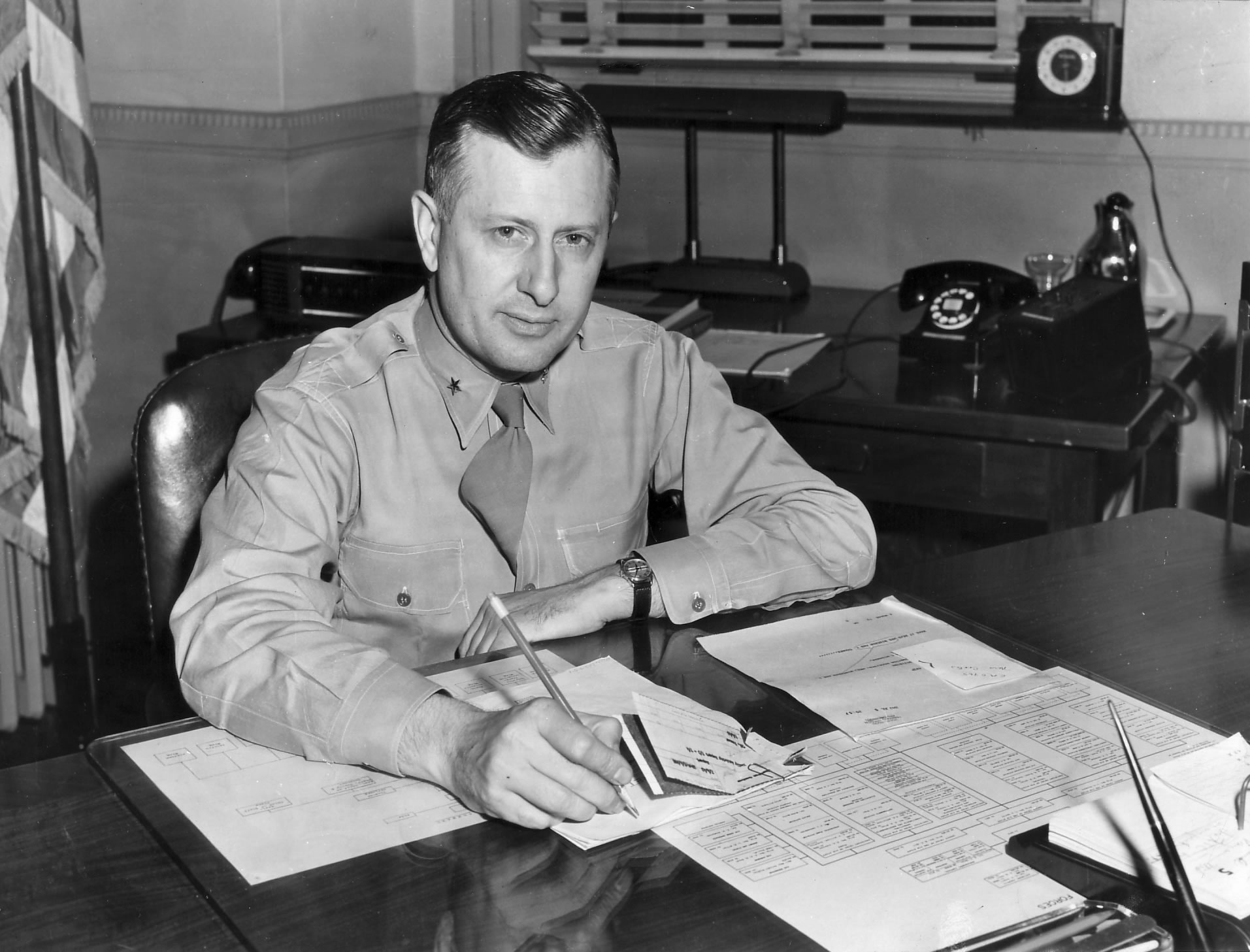
- William H. Tunner in 1943
- Born: William Henry Tunner; July 14, 1906; Elizabeth, New Jersey, U.S.
- Died: April 6, 1983 (aged 76); Ware Neck, Virginia, U.S.
- Burial place: Arlington National Cemetery
- Military career
- Allegiance: United States of America
- Branch: United States Air Force; United States Army Air Forces; United States Army Air Corps
- Service years: 1928–1960
- Rank: Lieutenant General
- Nicknames: Willie the Whip; Tonnage Tunner
- Commands: Ferrying Division, ATC; India-China Division, ATC; Combined Air Lift Task Force; United States Air Forces Europe; Military Air Transport Service
- Conflicts: World War II; Korean War
- Awards: Distinguished Service Cross; Distinguished Service Medal (4); Legion of Merit; Distinguished Flying Cross; Bronze Star Medal (2); Air Medal (3); Order of the Bath; Order of the Sacred Tripod; German Great Cross of Merit with star

William Henry Tunner (July 14, 1906 – April 6, 1983) was a general officer in the United States Air Force and its predecessor, the United States Army Air Forces. Tunner was known for his expertise in the command of large-scale military airlift operations, first in Air Transport Command (ATC) during World War II, commanding The Hump operation, and later in Military Air Transport Service (MATS) during the Berlin Airlift in 1949–1951. He eventually rose to the rank of Lieutenant general and commanded MATS itself.

Tunner appointed Nancy Love to the staff of his first major command in 1942 and was a key figure in the planning and creation of the Women's Auxiliary Ferrying Service.

== Military career ==
=== Air Corps ===
At West Point in 1928

Tunner entered the United States Military Academy on July 1, 1924, appointed from the 5th District of New Jersey by United States Representative Ernest R. Ackerman. He was commissioned on June 9, 1928, as a second lieutenant of field artillery, then selected the Air Corps as his branch of service, commissioned 2nd lieutenant AC on September 8, 1928, when he entered flight training at Brooks Field, Texas. At the Advanced Flying School at Kelly Field, he received his final flight check from Capt. Claire Chennault and was awarded his pilot's wings in September 1929.

His first assignment was to Rockwell Field, California, as a pilot in the 11th Bombardment Squadron of the 7th Bomb Group, flying a bi-wing Keystone LB-5 bomber. There he was introduced to transport aircraft, ferrying a Fokker tri-motor to Sacramento with passengers aboard.

In October 1931 he was assigned to Randolph Field as a flying instructor, but was ill-suited to the task. After a board of review, Tunner was assigned to squadron officer duties during his tour so that he could continue flying. He was promoted to first lieutenant on July 1, 1934. In January 1935 he transferred to France Field, Panama Canal Zone, as a pilot with the 7th Observation Squadron. Again he worked a variety of staff duties in his squadron and as assistant operations officer of the 19th Composite Wing, advancing to the temporary rank of captain on September 26, 1935. In February 1937, back in his permanent rank of 1st lieutenant, he returned to the United States as adjutant at Lawson Field, Georgia, and as an observation pilot with the 16th Observation Squadron, which performed duties as the school squadron for the Infantry School at Fort Benning. He was promoted to the permanent rank of captain on June 9, 1938.

Tunner attended the third Air Corps Tactical School "short course" in 1939, followed by his first command, the tiny Memphis Air Corps Detachment of the 1st Military Department, largely a recruiting billet. On January 31, 1941, he was promoted to major and began duties in the Office of the Chief of Air Corps (OCAC) at Washington, D.C., in the Personnel Division, assigning himself collateral flying duties at nearby Bolling Field.

=== Army Air Forces ===
Prior to World War II on June 8, 1941, Major Tunner became a key figure in the creation of what became the Air Transport Command (ATC) when he was the second staff officer selected by Col. Robert Olds for the headquarters of the new Air Corps Ferrying Command. He advanced from adjutant and personnel officer of ACFC to executive officer on November 26. He was promoted to lieutenant colonel on January 5, 1942, and full colonel on March 1, 1942.

He was thus in a key position when ACFC, originally intended to deliver aircraft from factory to their point of embarkation overseas, had its name and mission changed under its second commander, Brig. Gen. Harold George, to support of U.S. and Allied operations worldwide by aerial transportation of supplies, personnel, and equipment using multi-engine aircraft. The first wartime organizational tables for ACFC (officially the Army Air Forces Ferrying Command after February 1942), were drawn up by Tunner, who organized and became commander of its Domestic Division on April 1, 1942. On July 1, 1942, the Domestic Division was renamed the Ferrying Division under ATC and continued its mission of aircraft delivery.

Under the aegis of the Ferrying Division, Tunner was responsible for organizing the Women's Auxiliary Ferrying Squadron (WAFS) in September 1942, a program of civil service female pilots to shuttle planes from factory to Army airfields. The WAFS program, developed from a plan first drawn up by Tunner's executive trouble-shooter Nancy Harkness Love, merged in August 1943 with Jacqueline Cochran's Women's Flying Training Detachment (WFTD) to become the Women Airforce Service Pilots (WASPS).

Tunner was promoted to Brigadier general on June 30, 1943, and tapped for command of the airlift supply operation from India to China in the spring of 1944. He made an inspection trip in the CBI theater with his prospective staff in June, where he piloted a C-46 Commando over "The Hump". He went back to the CBI in August and took command of what had become the India-China Division (ATC) on September 4, 1944. Tunner's orders were to increase cargo tonnage levels flown by the airlift but also to reduce an alarmingly high accident level. Tunner incorporated four-engined Douglas C-54 Skymaster cargo planes into a second route to China called the "Low Hump" that widened the airlift corridor from 50 to 200 miles to increase efficiency. He instituted maintenance and flying safety programs that reduced the deadly accident rate to less than a quarter of what it had been when he took command, despite more than doubling the tonnage and hours flown.

On November 10, 1945, he returned to the United States, where he became Air Inspector of ATC on January 1, 1946. He held a series of division commands in the post-war ATC beginning February 1, 1946, and was promoted to Major general on July 10.

=== United States Air Force ===
When the Army Air Forces became the United States Air Force in September 1947, the Military Air Transport Service was formed by combining ATC and the Naval Air Transport Service. Maj. Gen. Laurence S. Kuter selected Tunner to be his deputy commander for operations in March 1948.

Almost immediately, Tunner's reputation for managing airlift recommended him to bring efficiency to the Berlin Airlift. The organization of the five-week-old operation was haphazard because USAFE was a tactical organization without experience in running transport operations, trying to feed the city using 54 C-54 Skymasters supplemented by a section of C-47 Skytrains, basically using bomber operation methods. On July 22, 1948, the National Security Council met with European commander Gen. Lucius D. Clay and concluded that expansion of the operation was essential. Gen. Hoyt S. Vandenberg immediately appointed Tunner to the job, and he arrived in Wiesbaden, Germany, on July 28, 1948. By mid-August Tunner had added 72 C-54s to the effort and brought in two-thirds of all USAF C-54 aircrews worldwide to fly the airlift 24 hours a day.

Tunner brought such a level of organization to the Berlin operation that the per-day tonnage brought into Berlin by the planes eventually exceeded the amount of material that had been brought in by train. Tunner is credited with organizing each western ally controlled air corridor into a one way path, which improved the efficiency of the airlift. His strict control of his subordinates along with his unorthodox solutions to problems earned him the nickname Willie-the-Whip. This included taking advantages of opportunities to enhance the operation such as upon learning about pilot Gail Halvorsen's dropping of candy mid-flight for the children of Berlin. Tunner ordered this activity expanded to "Operation Little Vittles" in which tons of candy would be dropped over Berlin in small parachutes created by American civilians, producing a major propaganda success for the Western Allies. Unfortunately for Tunner, much of the credit for the success of the airlift, and the innovations that led to that success, were given to General Curtis LeMay, the Air Force commander in Europe until October 1948.

The airlift program was gradually wound down as squadrons were broken up and reassigned to their regular MATS duties. Tunner returned to his post in MATS on September 5, 1949. The outbreak of the Korean War took him to Tokyo, Japan, to command a new airlift organization in the Far East Air Forces, Combat Cargo Command (Provisional) on September 10, 1950.

Combat Cargo Command had the initial job of providing the airlift for the Inchon invasion and subsequent airborne operations. Tunner's success in meeting the commitments is attested to by the Distinguished Service Cross awarded him on the spot by General Douglas MacArthur. Combat Cargo Command was discontinued on January 25, 1951, when a permanent organization, 315th Air Division, was activated. In its four-and-a-half months under "Tonnage Tunner", it had made 32,632 sorties; delivered 130,170 tons of cargo; carried 155,294 passengers including paratroopers; and evacuated 72,960 casualties.

In February 1951 Tunner was assigned to the Air Materiel Command at Wright-Patterson Air Force Base, Ohio, as deputy commander. In 1953, he was appointed commander, United States Air Forces in Europe, a post he held four years during the buildup of NATO air forces.

In 1957, he was reassigned to Headquarters U.S. Air Force as deputy chief of staff for operations. On July 1, 1958, concurrently with the assumption by the Military Air Transport Service of the "Single Managership for Airlift", he returned to the air transport field as commander, MATS, with headquarters at Scott Air Force Base, Illinois. He became a prime and impassioned spokesman for the development and deployment of the Lockheed C-141 Starlifter as the primary jet airlift transport for MATS, and supported the election of John F. Kennedy as president to achieve that end when the Eisenhower administration rejected it.

Tunner retired from the Air Force on May 31, 1960 after a heart problem was diagnosed.

In addition to the Distinguished Service Cross, Tunner received the Distinguished Service Medal with three oak leaf clusters, the Legion of Merit, the Distinguished Flying Cross, the Bronze Star Medal with one oak leaf cluster and the Air Medal with two oak leaf clusters. His foreign awards included Honorary Companion of the Order of the Bath from the United Kingdom, Order of Pao Ting (Tripod) Yun Hui from China and the Knight Commander's Cross with star of the Order of Merit from West Germany in 1982. He was also conferred an honorary doctor of military science degree by the University of Maryland in 1956.

=== Legacy ===
The Lieutenant General William H. Tunner Award is presented annually by the commander of the Air Mobility Command to the "outstanding strategic airlift crew" in the United States Air Force.

In 1997 the USAF began procurement of the 60K Tunner Materiel Handling Equipment (MHE), a diesel-driven aircraft loader built by Systems & Electronics, Inc. for loading and unloading wide-body cargo transports, designed to be deployed by C-5, C-17 and C-141 transports. It has the capability to load and unload the C-130, C-141, C-5 and C-17, as well as the commercial DC-10, L-1011 and B-747 freighters. The equipment was named to honor Tunner by an industry naming contest.

First recipient of the Airlift/Tanker Association Hall of Fame Award in 1989.

A street in the Berlin borough of Steglitz-Zehlendorf is named after him.

== Personal biography ==
Tunner was the fourth of five children of immigrants from Leoben, Austria. His ancestors Peter Tunner the Elder (1786–1844) and Peter Tunner (1809–1897) were metallurgists, mining specialists and montanists who co-founded Austria's famous "Bergakademie" (Mining Academy) at Leoben. His father was an engineer as well and settled in Roselle, New Jersey, where Tunner was raised.

Tunner married twice, the first to Sarah Margaret Sams of Meridian, Mississippi. They had two sons, Joseph C. and Dr. William H. Tunner, Jr. Sarah was diagnosed with an inoperable brain tumor following surgery on November 12, 1945, and remained in a coma for a year and a half. After her death in 1947, Tunner married a former WASP pilot Margaret Ann (Ann) Hamilton of Enid, Oklahoma in 1951, and they had a daughter, Hamilton Suzanne Tunner Hudson.

Tunner died at his farm in Ware Neck, Virginia on April 6, 1983, and was buried at Arlington National Cemetery.

== See also ==
- General Albert Wedemeyer
- List of commanders of USAFE
