= Enos Mafokate =

South African equestrian (1946–2026)

Enos Mafokate (1946 – 3 September 2026) was a South African show jumper and founder of a riding school. He became successful as the first black South African show jumper.

== Biography ==
Born in a Johannesburg township Mafokate lived with his parents in the countryside, where he worked on a farm as a groom and thereby started to love horses. The (white) owner of the farm taught him riding. In 1962 he worked as a groom for professional show jumpers. He had his first chance in competitive showjumping, when his employer decided to let the black grooms compete against each other. Mafokate first competed just against other black people, as he was not allowed to compete against whites.

His career ended in 1962 for the time being, because of political problems. However, in 1975 he enrolled at the Marist Brothers College, a showjumping school, which allowed 17 black grooms at their school. Because he won many competitions he gained recognition and was furthermore called "black rider", not "groom". His international career started in 1980, when he was spotted by the British rider David Broome. 1992 was the first time since 1960 for South Africa to compete at the Olympics, because prior to that South Africa was suspended because of Apartheid. Mafokate, as being the first black South African show jumper, did not compete actively, but accompanied the games as a sports ambassador.

In 2007 Mafokate founded the Soweto Equestrian Foundation (SEF), a non-profit riding school. It has the aim to improve the welfare of cart horses in Soweto, to open the elite world of riding to people, who would otherwise never get the chance to ride a horse, and to get disabled children on horses. To accomplish this the pupils at the riding school only have to pay a very small membership fee.

Mafokate had six children. Two of his sons, Arthur and Oupa, became kwaito musicians. Mafokate died on 3 September 2026, at the age of 80.

== Success as a rider ==
- 1976: Second at the Rothmanns Derby
- 1977, 1978: Winner of the competitions at the Constantia Show Grounds in Cape Town
