= Nancy Batson Crews =

American politician

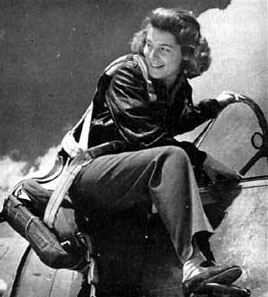
- Born: February 1, 1920
- Died: January 14, 2001 (aged 80)
- Spouse: Paul Crews

Nancy Batson Crews (1920-2001) was one of the original women to participate in the Women's Auxiliary Ferrying Squadron (WAFS) during World War II.

== Personal life ==
Crews was born to Stephen and Ruth Batson in 1920 and she was one of four children. Crews considered herself very fortunate to be born into an upper-middle-class family, as well as, parents that allowed her to be outside the Southern belle ideal. Her mother instilled Southern values but allowed Crews to be who she wanted to be. She wanted to fly since she saw Charles Lindbergh in Birmingham. Additionally, Crews was an excellent athlete during her youth, she participated in horseback riding and golf. During high school, Crews was on the cheerleading team. At the University of Alabama, Crews was elected to the highest coed office. In 1941, she graduated from University of Alabama. On February 1, 1946 she married Paul Crews and together they had three children, Paul, Radford, and Elinor. Finally, what was originally believed to be pneumonia was actually lung cancer which caused Crews' death on January 14, 2001.

== Time in WAFS ==
In August 1943, WAFS was changed to WASP.[Women Airforce Service Pilots] (WASP) was created because Col. William H. Tunner commander of the Ferrying Division needed so many ferry pilots that he was willing to allow trained women to perform the job. In 1944, Crews graduated from pursuit school. Crews' assignment was to ferry P-47s from the factory to embarkation points to later be moved to war zones. She often would travel one coast to the other at heights up to four miles high at three hundred miles per hour. She was one of the first twenty-eight women to pilot a United States plane in World War II.

== Life after WASP ==
While Crews stopped flying between 1949 and 1959 because her children were young, she continued to fly for most of her life. During the 1960s, Crews and her Super Club created a flying business. Through her business, she learned to how fly gliders and later became an instructor. In her seventies, she created a land and home development business. She was the first president of WAFS post-war organization between the year 1972–1975. Additionally, she was elected mayor of California City for one term in 1978. Also, she served one term as the St. Claire County Airport Commissioner. At seventy-nine, Crews co-piloted a corporate turbojet for almost eighty hours.

== Awards and recognition ==
In 1989, Crews was inducted into the Alabama Aviation Hall of Fame. In 1997, a plaque with her name was placed outside of Forest of Friendship. In 2004, she was inducted into the Alabama Women's Hall of Fame. Finally, on March 10, 2010 Crews and the WASPs as a whole received a Congressional Gold Medal. Crews' uniform, Mooney Mite, and first logbook are kept at the Southern Museum of Flight in Alabama.
