= Paul Vittet =

Swiss sports shooter

Personal information
- Born: 26 November 1932 Geneva, Switzerland
- Died: 22 October 1998 (aged 65)

Sport
- Sport: Sports shooting

Paul Vittet (26 November 1932 – 22 October 1998) was a Swiss sports shooter. He competed at the 1968 Summer Olympics and the 1972 Summer Olympics.
