= Frank Deveney =

Australian cricketer

Personal information
- Born: 16 August 1910; Melbourne, Australia
- Died: 30 October 1998 (aged 88); Melbourne, Australia

Domestic team information
- Years: Team
- 1936-1938: Victoria
- Source: Cricinfo, 22 November 2015

Frank Deveney (16 August 1910 – 30 October 1998) was an Australian cricketer. He played four first-class cricket matches for Victoria between 1936 and 1938.

== See also ==
- List of Victoria first-class cricketers
