= Zombo (singer) =

- Born: Tebogo Ndlovu; 3 May 1979
- Died: 17 February 2008 (aged 28) Johannesburg, South Africa
- Genres: Kwaito hip hop
- Occupations: Singer, songwriter, Producer
- Labels: 999 Music
- Formerly of: Abashante

Zombo (3 May 1979 – 17 February 2008), born Tebogo Ndlovu, was a South African singer, songwriter and music producer, best known as a member of kwaito group Abashante.

== Biography ==
Zombo earned fame as a rapper with kwaito stars Abashante in the 1990s. The group, which also included vocalists Nestum and Queen Sesako, were known for their energetic dancing routines. Their most successful album was their 1996 debut, "Girls" (released before Zombo joined the group), which went platinum in South Africa. Later releases included "Settlin’ The Score", "Ayoyo", and "Intwenjani?".

After leaving Abashante, Zombo worked as a music producer and started his own record label. As a solo artist and as a member of new group Collabo he failed to emulate his former success as a performer, though his album "Zombo" earned a nomination for Best Rap Album at the 2003 South African Music Awards. By 2008 he was living in poverty, complaining in a newspaper interview that he lacked even the money to feed himself properly.

Zombo died of AIDS-related causes in February 2008, a month after revealing his HIV-positive status to the media. Fellow South African musicians said at the time that his talents would be sorely missed. According to singer Preston Sihlangu, "He was a versatile singer. Zombo was a producer, songwriter, and singer. He could start a song from scratch and produce it himself. That skill is very rare."
