= Jacqueline Cochran =

American aviator and businesswoman (1906–1980)

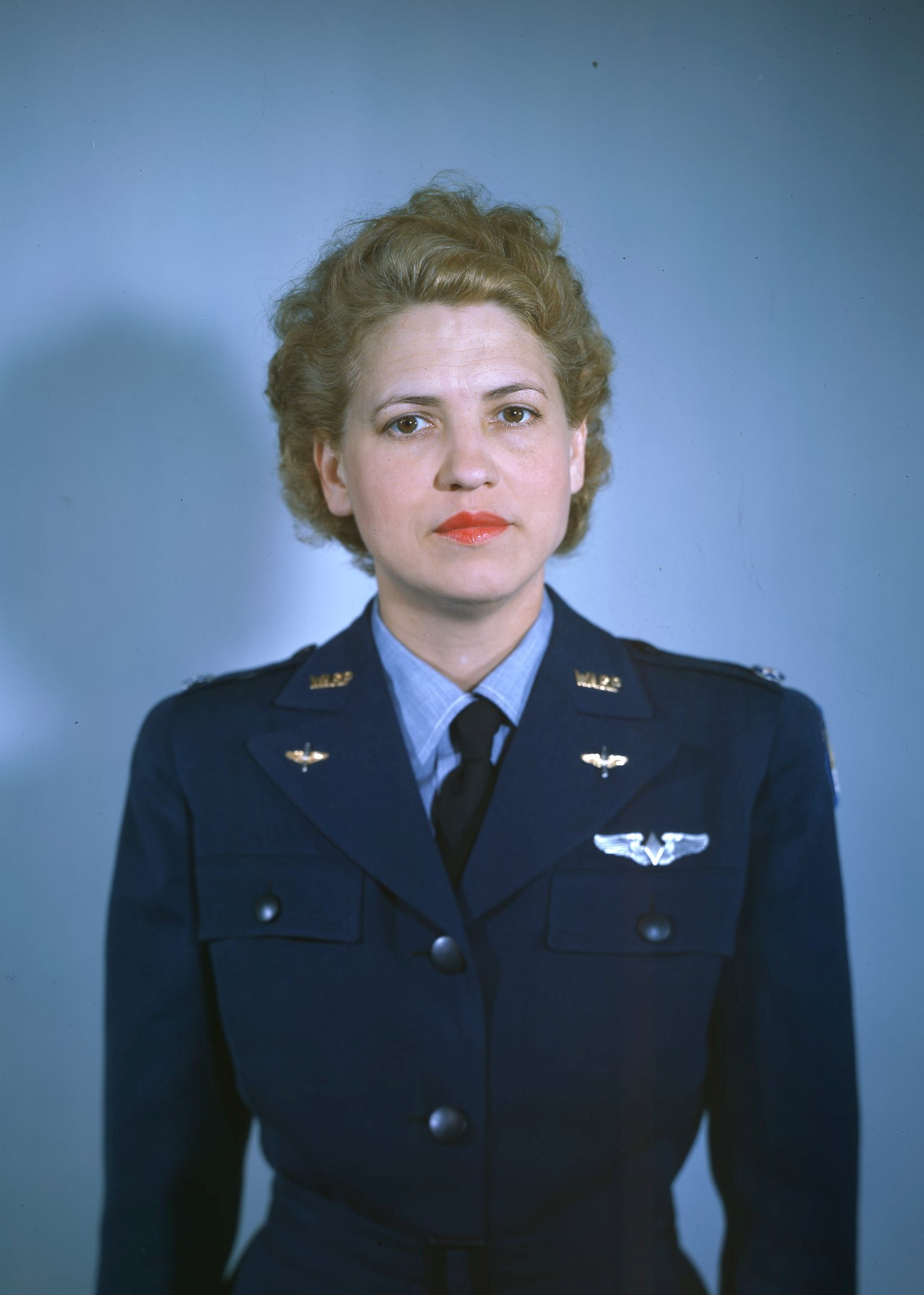
- Cochran c. 1943
- Born: May 11, 1906; Pensacola, Florida, U.S.
- Died: August 9, 1980 (aged 74); Indio, California, U.S.
- Occupations: Aviator, test pilot, spokesperson, and businessperson
- Political party: Republican
- Spouse(s): Robert Cochran; Floyd Bostwick Odlum
- Military career
- Allegiance: United States
- Branch: Women Airforce Service Pilots; Air Force Reserve Command
- Service years: 1942–1970
- Rank: Colonel
- Awards: Distinguished Service Medal; Distinguished Flying Cross

Jacqueline Cochran (born Bessie Lee Pittman; May 11, 1906 – August 9, 1980) was an American pilot and business executive. She pioneered women's aviation and was the first woman to break the sound barrier on 18 May 1953. Cochran (along with Nancy Love) was the wartime head of the Women Airforce Service Pilots (WASP) (1943–1944), which employed about 1,000 civilian American women in a non-combat role to ferry planes from factories to port cities. Later on, Cochran was initially a sponsor of the Mercury 13 women astronaut program, before testifying against it in a congressional subcommittee.

== Early life ==
Cochran was born Bessie Lee Pittman in Pensacola, (some sources indicate she was born in DeFuniak Springs) in the Florida Panhandle. She was the youngest of the five children of Mary (Grant) and Ira Pittman, a skilled millwright who frequently relocated setting up and reworking sawmills. While her family was not wealthy, Cochran's childhood living in small-town Florida was similar to those in other families of the era. Contrary to some accounts, there was always food on the table and she was not adopted, as she often claimed.

Circa 1920 (she would have been 13 or 14), she married Robert Cochran and gave birth to a son, Robert, who died in 1925 at the age of 5. After the marriage ended, she kept the name Cochran and began using Jacqueline or Jackie as her given name. Cochran then became a hairdresser and got a job in Pensacola, eventually moving to New York City. There, she used her looks and driving personality to get a job at a prestigious salon at Saks Fifth Avenue.

Although Cochran denied her family and her past, she remained in touch with them and provided for them over the years. Some of her family moved to her ranch in California after she remarried. They were instructed to always say they were her adopted family. Cochran apparently wanted to hide from the public the early chapters of her life and was successful in doing so until after her death.

Later Cochran met Floyd Bostwick Odlum, founder of Atlas Corp and CEO of RKO in Hollywood. Fourteen years her senior, he was reputed to be one of the 10 wealthiest men in the world. Odlum became enamored of Cochran and offered to help her establish a cosmetics business.

After a friend offered her a ride in an aircraft, Cochran began taking flying lessons at Roosevelt Airfield, Long Island in the early 1930s and learned to fly an aircraft in three weeks. She then soloed and within two years obtained her commercial pilot's license. Odlum, whom she married in 1936 after his divorce, was an astute financier and savvy marketer who recognized the value of publicity for her business. Calling her line of cosmetics Wings to Beauty, she flew her own aircraft around the country promoting her products. Years later, Odlum used his Hollywood connections to get Marilyn Monroe to endorse Cochran's line of lipstick.

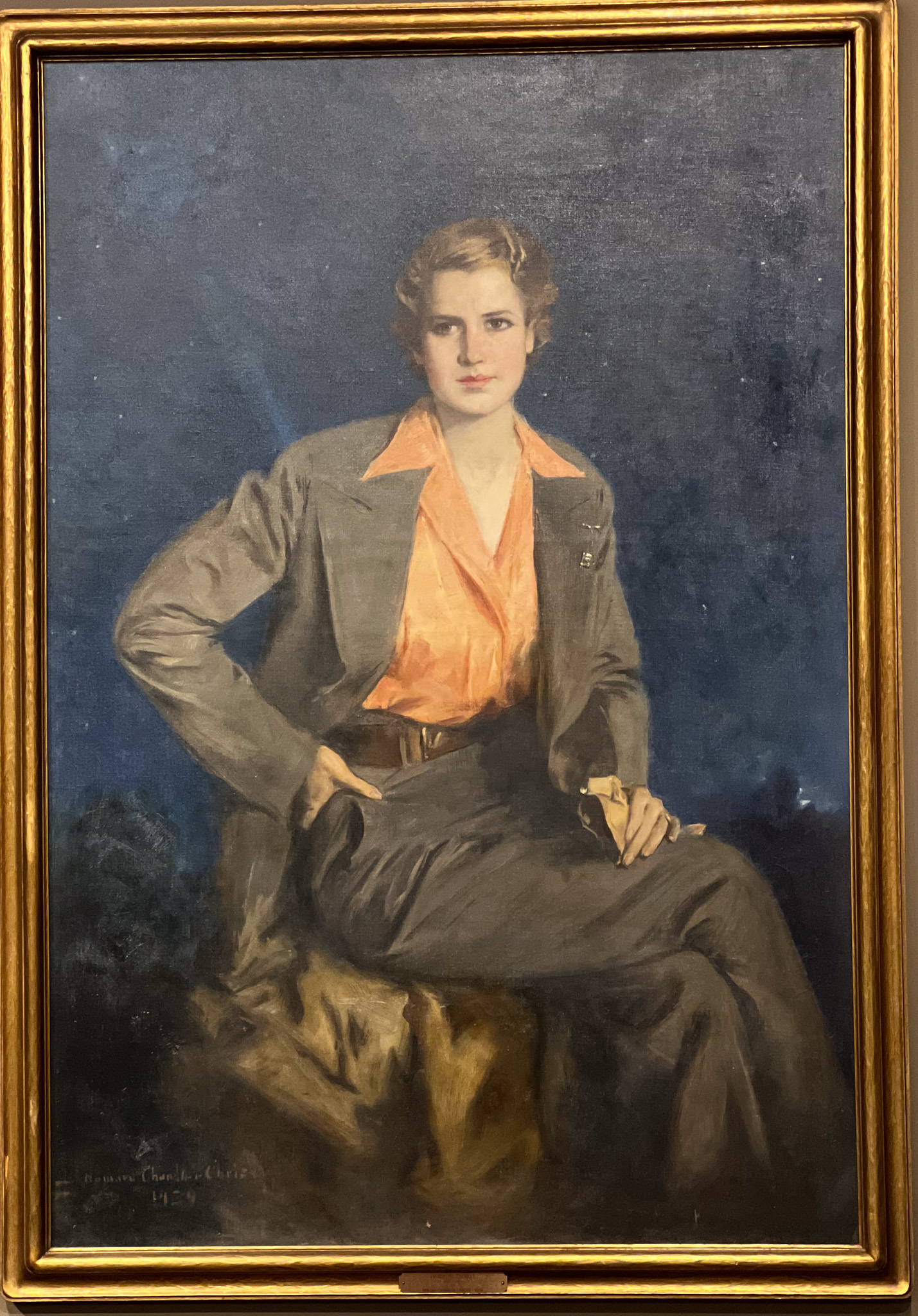
Portrait painting of Jacqueline Cochran, oil on canvas, by Howard Chandler Christy (1872–1952)

== Contributions to aviation ==
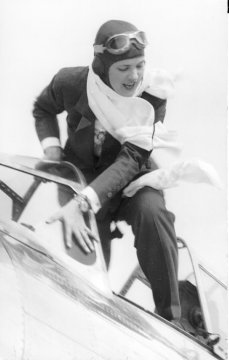
1938 Bendix Race

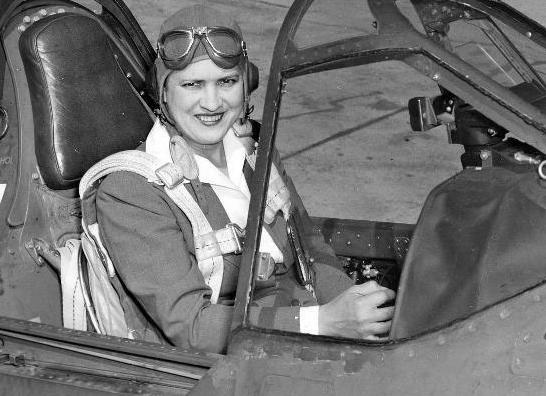
Cochran in the cockpit of a Curtiss P-40 Warhawk.

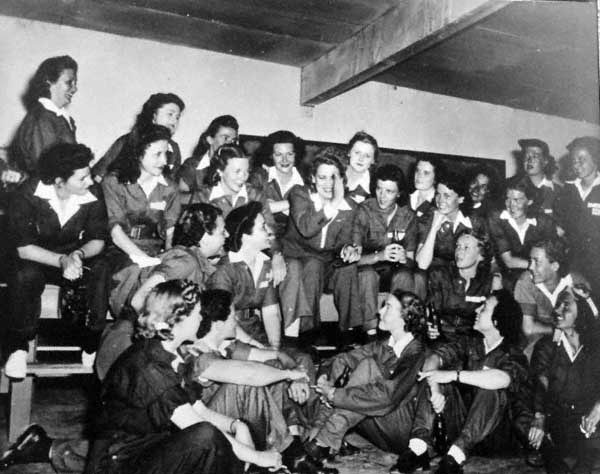
Cochran (center) with WASP trainees

Known by her friends as "Jackie", and maintaining the Cochran married surname, she was one of three women to compete in the MacRobertson Air Race in 1934. In 1937, she was the only woman to compete in the Bendix race and worked with Amelia Earhart to open the race to women. That year, she also set a new women's world speed record. By 1938, she was considered the best female pilot in the United States. She had won the Bendix and set a new transcontinental speed record as well as altitude records. Cochran flew a bomber—a Lockheed Model 414 Hudson Mk.V(LR)—across the Atlantic on June 11–19, 1941, the first woman to do so. She won five Harmon Trophies. Sometimes called the "Speed Queen", at the time of her death she held more speed, distance, or altitude records in aviation history than any other pilot.

=== Ninety-Nines ===
Cochran was a friend of Amelia Earhart. Although she was not a founding member of the Ninety-Nines, she was one of their most influential members. She was president of the Ninety-Nines from 1941 to 1943, and was instrumental in ensuring that women pilots would be able to participate in the newly-founded Civil Air Patrol as well as the WASP. In her monthly editorials for the Ninety-Nines Newsletter, she exhorted members to join the CAP or the WASP, and to do what they could to help the war effort.

=== Air Transport Auxiliary ===
Before the United States joined World War II, Cochran was part of "Wings for Britain", an organization that ferried American-built aircraft to Britain, becoming the first woman to fly a bomber (a Lockheed Hudson V) across the Atlantic. In Britain, she volunteered her services to the Royal Air Force. For several months she worked for the British Air Transport Auxiliary (ATA), recruiting qualified women pilots in the United States and taking them to England where they joined the ATA. Cochran attained the rank of Flight Captain (equivalent to a Squadron Leader in the RAF or a Major in the U.S. Air Force) in the ATA.

=== Women Airforce Service Pilots ===
In September, 1939, Cochran wrote to Eleanor Roosevelt to introduce the proposal of starting a women's flying division in the Army Air Forces. She felt that qualified women pilots could do all of the domestic, noncombat aviation jobs necessary to release more male pilots for combat. She pictured herself in command of these women, with the same standings as Colonel Oveta Culp Hobby, who was then the director of the Women's Army Auxiliary Corps (WAAC). (The WAAC was given full military status on July 1, 1943, thus making them part of the Army. At the same time, the unit was renamed Women's Army Corps (WAC).)

That same year, Cochran wrote a letter to Lieutenant Colonel Robert Olds, who was helping to organize the Air Corps Ferrying Command for the Air Corps at the time. (Ferrying Command was originally a courier/aircraft delivery service, but evolved into the air transport branch of the United States Army Air Forces (USAAF) as the Air Transport Command). In the letter, Cochran suggested that women pilots be employed to fly non-combat missions for the new command. In early 1941, Olds asked Cochran to find out how many women pilots there were in the United States, what their flying times were, their skills, their interest in flying for the country, and personal information about them. She used records from the Civil Aeronautics Administration to gather the data.

In spite of pilot shortages, Army Air Forces commander Lieutenant General Henry H. "Hap" Arnold still needed to be convinced that women pilots were the solution to his staffing problems. He knew that women were being used successfully in the ATA in England so Arnold suggested that Cochran take a group of qualified female pilots to see how the British were doing. He promised her that no decisions regarding women flying for the USAAF would be made until she returned.

When Arnold asked Cochran to go to Britain to study the ATA, Cochran asked 76 of the most qualified female pilots – identified during the research she had done earlier for Olds – to come along and fly for the ATA. Qualifications for these women were high: at least 300 hours of flying time, but most of the women pilots had over 1,000 hours. Those who made it to Canada found out that the washout rate was also high. A total of 25 women passed the tests and, two months later in March 1942 they went to Britain with Cochran to join the ATA.

While Cochran was in England, in September 1942, General Arnold authorized the formation of the Women's Auxiliary Ferrying Squadron (WAFS) under the direction of Nancy Harkness Love. The WAFS began at New Castle Air Base in Wilmington, Delaware, with a group of female pilots whose objective was to ferry military aircraft. Hearing about the WAFS, Cochran immediately returned from England. Cochran's experience in Britain with the ATA convinced her that women pilots could be trained to do much more than ferrying. As she lobbied Arnold for expanded flying opportunities for female pilots, he sanctioned the creation of the Women's Flying Training Detachment (WFTD), headed by Cochran. In August 1943, the WAFS and the WFTD merged to create the Women Airforce Service Pilots (WASP) with Cochran as director and Nancy Love as head of the ferrying division.

As director of the WASP, Cochran supervised the training of hundreds of women pilots at the former Avenger Field in Sweetwater, Texas from August 1943 to December 1944.

=== Award of the Distinguished Service Medal ===
For her wartime service, she received the Distinguished Service Medal (DSM) in 1945. Her award of the DSM was announced in a War Department press release dated March 1, 1945 which stated that Cochran was the first woman civilian to receive the DSM, which was then the highest non-combat award presented by the United States government. (In actuality, however, a few civilian women received the DSM for service during the First World War. These women included Hannah J. Patterson and Anna Howard Shaw of the Council of National Defense, Evangeline Booth of the Salvation Army as well as Mary Vail Andress and Jane A. Delano of the American Red Cross.)

== Postwar ==
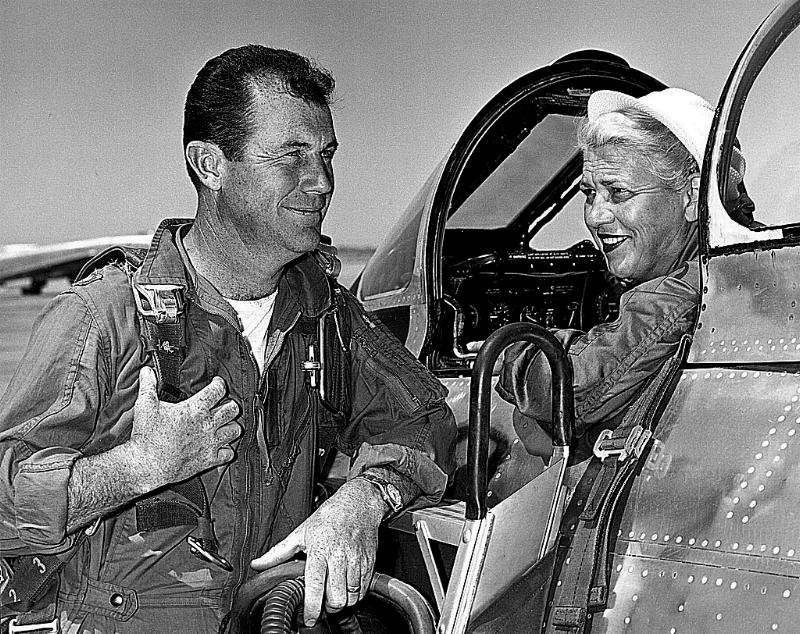
Cochran in her record-setting Canadair Sabre 3, talking with Chuck Yeager

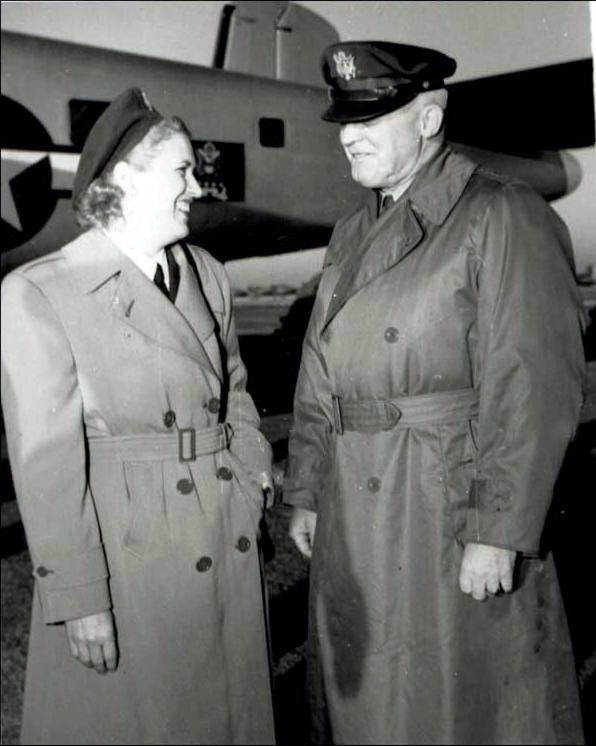
Cochran with General Hap Arnold

At war's end, Cochran was hired by a magazine to report on global postwar events. In this role, she witnessed Japanese General Tomoyuki Yamashita's surrender in the Philippines and was the first non-Japanese woman to enter Japan after the War. She also attended the Nuremberg Trials in Germany.

On September 9, 1948, Cochran joined the U.S. Air Force Reserve as a lieutenant colonel. She was promoted to colonel in 1969 and retired in 1970. During her career in the Air Force Reserve, she received three awards of the Distinguished Flying Cross for various achievements from 1947 to 1964.

=== Flying records ===
Postwar, Cochran began flying the new jet aircraft, setting numerous records. She became the first woman pilot to "go supersonic".

In 1952, Cochran, at age 47, decided to challenge the world speed record for women, then held by Jacqueline Auriol. She tried to borrow an F-86 Sabre from the U.S. Air Force, but was refused. She was introduced to an Air Vice-Marshal of the Royal Canadian Air Force (RCAF) who, with the permission of the Canadian Minister of Defence, arranged for her to borrow the sole Canadair Sabre Mk.3. Canadair sent a 16-man support team to California for the attempt. On 18 May 1953, Cochran set a new 100 km speed record of 1,050.15 km/h (652.5 mph). Later on 3 June, she set a new 15 km closed circuit record of 1078 km/h (670 mph). Encouraged by then-Major Chuck Yeager, with whom Cochran shared a lifelong friendship, on May 18, 1953, at Rogers Dry Lake, California, Cochran flew the Sabre 3 at an average speed of 652.337 mph. During the course of this run the Sabre went supersonic, and Cochran became the first woman to break the sound barrier. (Note: During her supersonic run, Yeager flew right on her wing.)

Among her many record accomplishments, from August to October 1961, as a consultant to Northrop Corporation, Cochran set a series of speed, distance and altitude records while flying a Northrop T-38A Talon supersonic trainer. On the final day of the record series, she set two Fédération Aéronautique Internationale (FAI) world records, taking the T-38 to altitudes of 55,253 feet (16,841 m) in horizontal flight and reaching a peak altitude of 56,073 feet (17,091 m).

Cochran was also the first woman to land and take off from an aircraft carrier, the first woman to pilot a bomber across the North Atlantic (in 1941) and later to fly a jet aircraft on a transatlantic flight, the first woman to make a blind (instrument) landing, the only woman ever to be president of the Fédération Aéronautique Internationale (1958–1961), the first woman to fly a fixed-wing, jet aircraft across the Atlantic, the first pilot to fly above 20,000 feet (6,096 m) with an oxygen mask, and the first woman to enter the Bendix Transcontinental Race. She still holds more distance and speed records than any pilot living or dead, male or female.

Because of her interest in all forms of aviation, Cochran flew the Goodyear Blimp in the early 1960s with Goodyear Blimp Captain R. W. Crosier in Akron, Ohio.

=== Mercury 13 ===
In the 1960s, Cochran was a sponsor of the Mercury 13 program, an early effort to test the ability of women to be astronauts. Thirteen women pilots passed the same preliminary tests as the male astronauts of the Mercury program before the program was cancelled. It was never a NASA initiative, though it was spearheaded by two members of the NASA Life Sciences Committee, one of whom, William Randolph Lovelace II, was a close friend of Cochran and her husband. Though Cochran initially supported the program, she was later responsible for delaying further phases of testing, and letters from her to members of the Navy and NASA expressing concern over whether the program was to be run properly and in accordance with NASA goals may have significantly contributed to the eventual cancellation of the program. It is generally accepted that Cochran turned against the program out of concern that she would no longer be the most prominent female aviator.

On July 17 and 18, 1962, Representative Victor Anfuso (D-NY) convened public hearings before a special Subcommittee of the House Committee on Science and Astronautics to determine whether or not the exclusion of women from the astronaut program was discriminatory, during which John Glenn and Scott Carpenter testified against admitting women to the astronaut program. Cochran herself argued against bringing women into the space program, saying that time was of the essence, and moving forward as planned was the only way to beat the Soviets in the Space Race. (None of the women who had passed the tests were military jet test pilots, nor did they have engineering degrees, which were the two basic experiential qualifications for potential astronauts. Women were not allowed to be military jet test pilots at that time. On average, however, they all had more flight experience than the male astronauts.) "NASA required all astronauts to be graduates of military jet test piloting programs and have engineering degrees. In 1962, no women could meet these requirements." This ended the Mercury 13 program. However, John Glenn and Scott Carpenter, who were part of the Mercury 7, also did not have engineering degrees when they were selected. Both of them were granted a degree after their flights for NASA.

Significantly, the hearings investigated the possibility of gender discrimination a full two years before the Civil Rights Act of 1964 made that illegal.

== Political activities ==
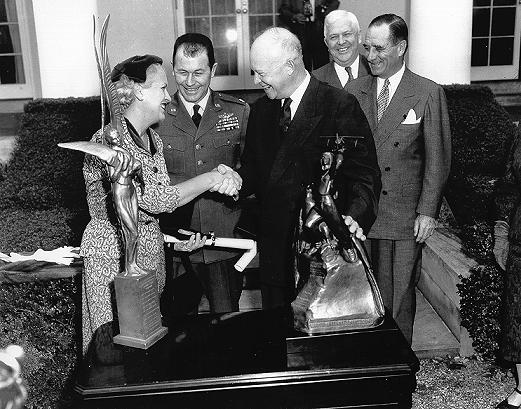
Cochran and Yeager being presented with the Harmon International Trophies by President Dwight Eisenhower

A lifelong Republican, Cochran, as a result of her involvement in politics and the military, became a close friend of General Dwight Eisenhower. In the early part of 1952, she and her husband helped sponsor a rally at Madison Square Garden in New York City in support of an Eisenhower presidential candidacy.

The rally was documented on film and Cochran personally flew the film to France for a special showing at Eisenhower's headquarters. Her efforts proved a major factor in convincing Eisenhower to run for President of the United States in 1952 and she played a major role in his successful campaign. Eisenhower frequently visited the Odlums at their California ranch and wrote portions of his memoirs there.

Politically ambitious, Cochran ran for Congress in 1956 from California's 29th Congressional District as the candidate of the Republican Party. Her name appeared throughout the campaign and on the ballot as Jacqueline Cochran-Odlum. Although she defeated a field of five male opponents to win the Republican nomination, in the general election she lost a close election to Democratic candidate Dalip Singh Saund. Saund won with 54,989 votes (51.5%) to Cochran's 51,690 votes (48.5%). Her political setback was one of the few failures she ever experienced and she never attempted another run. Those who knew Cochran have said that the loss bothered her for the rest of her life, as she reportedly found it difficult to accept losing to "a Hindu", although Saund was in fact Sikh.

== Legacy ==
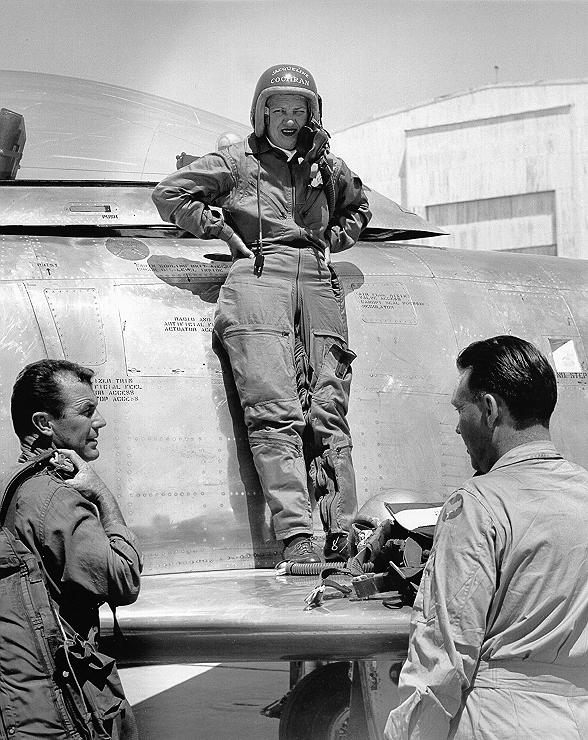
Cochran standing on the wing of her Canadair Sabre talking to Yeager and Canadair's chief test pilot Bill Longhurst

Cochran died on August 9, 1980, at the home in Indio, California, she had shared with her husband until his death four years earlier. She was a long-time resident of the Coachella Valley and is buried in Coachella Valley Public Cemetery. She regularly utilized Thermal Airport over the course of her long aviation career. The airport, which had been renamed Desert Resorts Regional, was renamed Jacqueline Cochran Regional Airport in her honor.

Despite her lack of formal education, Cochran had a quick mind and an affinity for business; her investment in the cosmetics field proved lucrative. In 1951, the Boston Chamber of Commerce voted her one of the 25 outstanding businesswomen in America. In 1953 and 1954, the Associated Press named her "Woman of the Year in Business".

Cochran served on the board of trustees for the George Washington University from 1962 until her death in 1980.

== Military awards ==

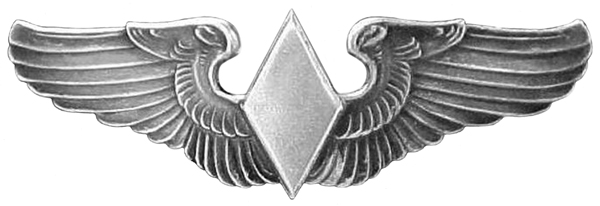

- U.S. Air Force Command Pilot Wings
- Women Airforce Service Pilots Badge
- Distinguished Service Medal
- Legion of Merit
- Distinguished Flying Cross with two oak leaf clusters
- American Campaign Medal
- World War II Victory Medal
- National Defense Service Medal with bronze service star
- Armed Forces Reserve Medal with bronze hour glass
- Defence Medal (United Kingdom)

=== Distinguished Service Medal Citation ===
The citation reads: “For exceptionally meritorious service to the Government in a position of great responsibility from June 1943 to December 1944 as Director of Women Pilots, Headquarters Army Air Forces. She directed the planning, programming and administration of all women pilot activities of the Army Air Forces, including the organization, training and operation of the Women Airforce Service Pilots (WASP). Under her leadership, the WASP performed with the utmost loyalty and efficiency, multiple flying services, in direct and effective support of the Army Air Forces which were of the greatest assistance and support to the war effort and the nation. Further, her achievements in this respect and the conclusions she has carefully and wisely drawn from this undertaking represent a contribution that is of permanent and far-reaching significance to the future of aviation. Her vision, skill and initiative have resulted in services of exceptional value and importance to the country.”

=== 1st Distinguished Flying Cross Citation ===
The President of the United States of America, authorized by Act of Congress, July 2, 1926, takes pleasure in presenting the Distinguished Flying Cross to Colonel Jacqueline Cochran, United States Air Force, for extraordinary achievement while participating in aerial flight from 1947 to 1951. During this period, Colonel Cochran piloted an F-51 aircraft in which she established six world speed records. At Coachella Valley, California, flying a closed-circuit 100-kilometer course, Colonel Cochran established a new speed record of 469.549 miles per hour. In other flights from Thermal, Indio, and Palm Springs, CA, Colonel Cochran established world speed records for the 3-, 15-, 500-, 1000-, and 2000-kilometer courses. The professional competence, aerial skill, and devotion to duty displayed by Colonel Cochran reflect great credit upon herself and the United States Air Force.

=== 2nd Distinguished Flying Cross Citation ===
The President of the United States of America, authorized by Act of Congress, July 2, 1926, takes pleasure in presenting a Bronze Oak Leaf Cluster in lieu of a Second Award of the Distinguished Flying Cross to Colonel Jacqueline Cochran, United States Air Force, for extraordinary achievement while participating in aerial flight during April 1962. During that period, Colonel Cochran established a number of world records on a flight from New Orleans, LA to Bonn, Germany. Flying a Lockheed Jet Star C-140 Colonel Cochran established 69 intercity, intercapital, and straight-line distance records and routes, in addition to becoming the first woman to fly a jet aircraft across the Atlantic Ocean. The records were for both speed and distance. The professional competence, aerial skill, and devotion to duty displayed by Colonel Cochran reflect great credit upon herself and the United States Air Force.

=== 3rd Distinguished Flying Cross Citation ===
The President of the United States of America, authorized by Act of Congress, July 2, 1926, takes pleasure in presenting a Second Bronze Oak Leaf Cluster in lieu of a Third Award of the Distinguished Flying Cross to Colonel Jacqueline Cochran, United States Air Force, for extraordinary achievement while participating in aerial flight during May and June 1964. During this period, Colonel Cochran established three world speed records in an F-104C Starfighter. Flying a precise circular course, Colonel Cochran set a 25-kilometer record of 1429.297 miles per hour, more than twice the speed of sound. She established a record for the 100-kilometer course by flying at 1302 miles per hour. Colonel Cochran established a third world's speed record by achieving 1135 miles per hour over a 500-kilometer course. The professional competence, aerial skill, and devotion to duty displayed by Colonel Cochran reflect great credit upon herself and the United States Air Force.

== Other awards ==
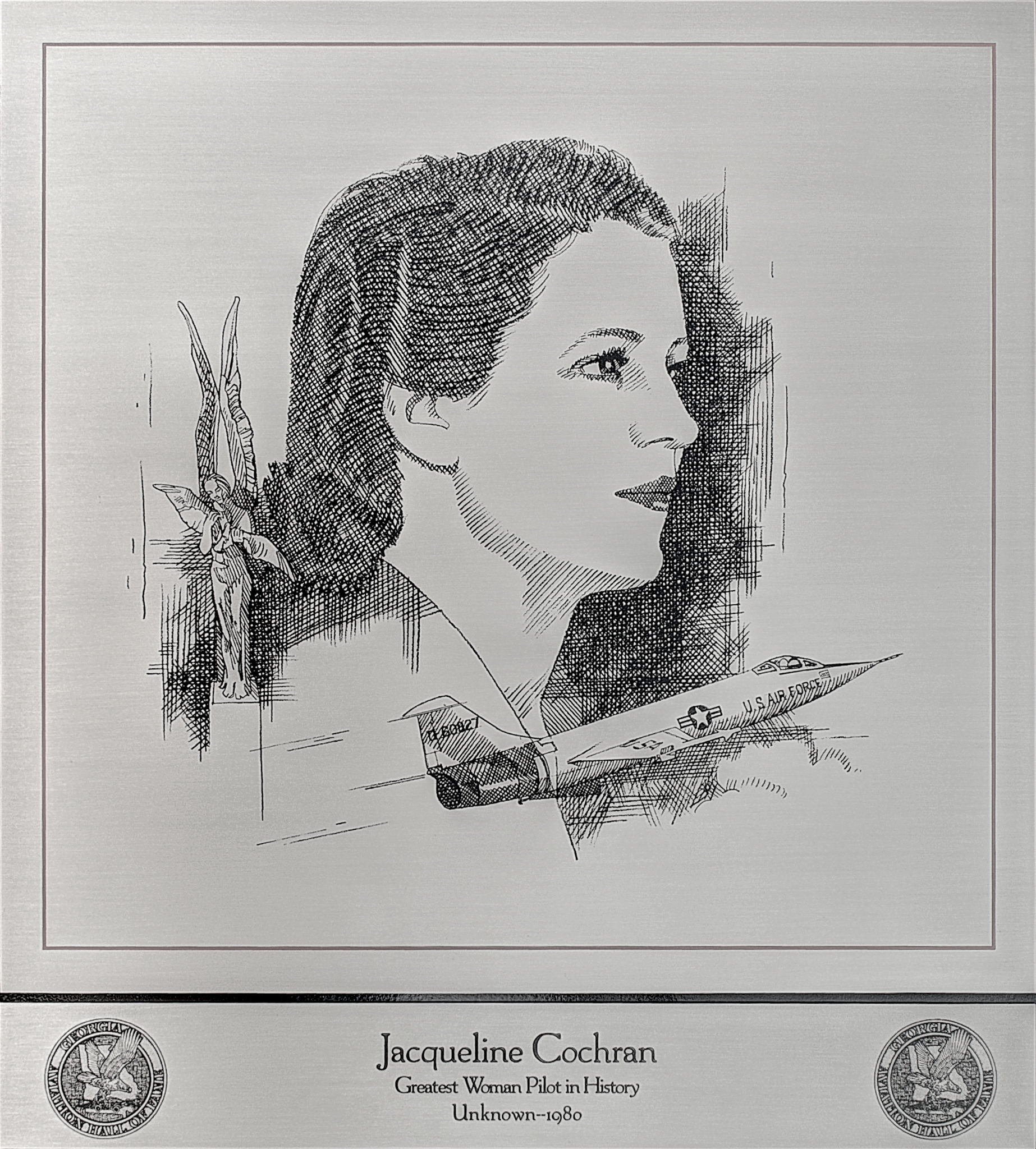
Plaque of Cochran at the Georgia Aviation Hall of Fame

From many countries around the world, Cochran received citations and awards. In 1949, the government of France recognized her contribution to the war and aviation awarding her in 1951 with the French Air Medal. She is the only woman to ever receive the Gold Medal from the Fédération Aéronautique Internationale. She went on to be elected to that body's board of directors and director of Northwest Airlines in the U.S. At home, the Air Force awarded her the Distinguished Flying Cross and the Legion of Merit. In 1949, Cochran became the fourth U.S. recipient of the Türk Hava Kurumu's (Turkish Aeronautical Association) highest award, the Murassa Brövesi (Diamond Brevet).

An annual air show called the Jacqueline Cochran Air Show is named in her honor and takes place at the Jacqueline Cochran Regional Airport near Coachella, California. Cochran also became the first woman to be honored with a permanent display of her achievements at the United States Air Force Academy. Cochran's life is chronicled In the play The Fastest Woman Alive, written by Karen Sunde.

Other honors include:

- 1964, received the Golden Plate Award of the American Academy of Achievement
- 1965, induction into the San Diego Air and Space Museum's International Air & Space Hall of Fame
- 1971, induction into the National Aviation Hall of Fame and named an honorary fellow of the Society of Experimental Test Pilots
- 1985, the International Astronomical Union assigned the name Cochran to a large (100 km in diameter) crater on planet Venus
- 1992, induction into the Florida Women's Hall of Fame
- 1993, induction into the Motorsports Hall of Fame of America
- 1993, induction into the National Women's Hall of Fame.
- 1996, the United States Post Office honored Cochran with a 50¢ postage stamp, depicting her in front of a Bendix Trophy pylon with her P-35 in the background and the words: "Jacqueline Cochran Pioneer Pilot"
- 2002, induction into the Georgia Aviation Hall of Fame.
- 2006, induction into the Lancaster, California Aerospace Walk of Honor as its first woman inductee
- 2016, Orden de la Independencia Cultural Rubén Darío
- 2021, dedication of statue in the Okaloosa County, Florida Women Veterans Memorial

== See also ==
- Jacqueline Auriol
- Jerrie Mock
- Women Airforce Service Pilots Badge
