= Oupa Mafokate =

South African musician (1970–1998)

Oupa "Makhendlas" Mafokate (22 December 1970 – 31 October 1998) was a pioneering South African Kwaito musician from Soweto, best known for the hit singles "Iminwe", "O Skatata", and "Lefatshe Lee Kela Makhendlas". He was one of the first Black artists to gain national Kwaito prominence under the 999 Records label, founded by his brother Arthur.

== Music career ==
His second album, Jwaleng (1997), featured the socially-themed title track "Otla shwela jwaleng" ("Check out you party animal...") as well as the single "Jealous", both of which became staples on township dance floors.

In late 1998 he released the single "Iminwe Phezulu" ("Hands Up"), which was celebrated by fans and later referred to by Arthur Mafokate as a “national anthem.”

== Early life ==
Oupa Mafokate, known by his stage name "Makhendlas", was a brother to Arthur Mafokate. He was born and raised in Chiawelo, Soweto. He is the son of Olympic equestrian and philanthropist Enos Mafokate. He joined his brother's 999 record label and released two albums under it.

== Death ==
On 31 October 1998, Mafokate was due to headline a concert in Tonga (now Mbombela). According to his label manager Mpho Makhetha, the event turned violent when a fan began harassing Mafokate’s crew. In the ensuing brawl, Mafokate "whipped out his gun and pumped three bullets into the troublesome man", then, overwhelmed by grief and confusion, turned the weapon on himself and died by suicide at age 28. Makhetha later defended Mafokate's carrying of a firearm as a response to the industry’s lack of security for township artists.

== Legacy ==
Each 31 October, Arthur Mafokate and fans commemorate his brother's death. On the 18th anniversary in 2016, Arthur posted on Instagram: "On this day 31st October a few years ago, we lost a humble brother who had just released a national anthem titled #IminwePhezulu. #LongLiveMakhendlas #Iminwe #Emenwe." Fellow entertainers, including Penny Lebyane and Tony Kgoroge, joined the tribute in the comments.

== Discography ==
- Makhendlas (1995)
- Jammer (1998)
- Ampiki (1999)

=== Singles and EPs ===
- "Jwaleng" (1997)
- "A Tribute to Makhendlas" (1998)
