= Women Airforce Service Pilots Badge =

United States Army award

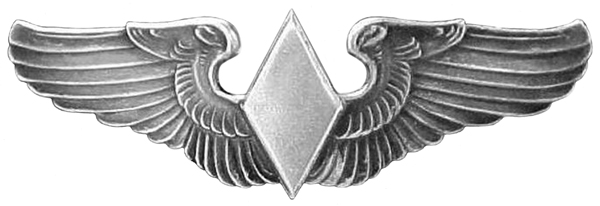
WASP Badge

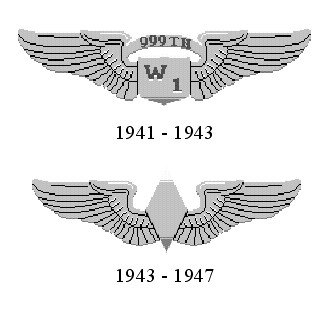
Two versions (early and standard) of the WASP Badge

The Women Airforce Service Pilots Badge is an award of the United States Army that was issued during the Second World War. The badge created for the Women Airforce Service Pilots, or WASP (not WASPs, because the acronym already includes the plural "Pilots"), was awarded to more than a thousand women who had qualified for employment as civilian, non-combat pilots of military aircraft used by the U.S. Army Air Forces during World War II. The first wings were privately and hastily designed and paid for out of the pockets of Floyd Odlum and his wife, Jacqueline Cochran, who in 1942 became the head of WASP.

The first seven classes of WASP flight school graduates in 1943 were issued silver wings with a central shield-shaped escutcheon, with the class number engraved on it. On the scroll above the shield, where the 999th appears, was the squadron number of the Training Command. The first two classes were marked with the 319th, and thereafter the 318th for the remaining five classes in 1943.

Classes graduating in 1944 and thereafter were issued the newly designed official Army Air Forces WASP wings with a diamond-shaped lozenge in the center. Unlike the earlier WASP wing design, with its central shield-shaped escutcheon, the new silver badge conformed to heraldic tradition by incorporating a lozenge centered between two wings. In heraldic usage, a lozenge is the traditional shape of a woman's coat of arms. It is said to have been selected for its resemblance to the shape of the shield carried by Athena, the Greek goddess of wisdom, weaving, crafts, and war. This design was used until the deactivation of WASP in December 1944. There were no more WASP wings authorized after that.

Following the 1947 creation of the United States Air Force, the next appearance of women Air Force pilots was in the 1970s, at which time all Air Force pilots were authorized to wear the same wing badge.

== See also ==
- Obsolete badges of the United States military
- Military badges of the United States
